= Athletics at the 2016 Summer Paralympics – Men's 100 metres =

Athletics – Men's 100 metres at the XV Paralympic Games
- Venue: Estádio Olímpico João Havelange
- Dates: 8 September – 16 September 2016
- No. of events: 16

The Men's 100m athletics events for the 2016 Summer Paralympics took place at the Estádio Olímpico João Havelange from 8 September to 16 September 2016. A total of 16 events were contested over this distance, and entry was open in 19 classifications.

== Schedule ==
R	Round 1	½	Semifinals	F	Final

Event↓/Date →	Thu 8	Fri 9	Sat 10	Sun 11	Mon 12	Tue 13	Wed 14	Thu 15	Fri 16	Sat 17
T11 100m			R	F						
T12 100m							R	F		
T13 100m	R	F								
T33 100m			F							
T34 100m				R	F					
T35 100m		F								
T36 100m			F							
T37 100m			R	F						
T38 100m					R	F				
T42 100m							R	F		
T44 100m	R	F								
T47 100m			R	F						
T51 100m						F				
T52 100m		R	F							
T53 100m		F								
T54 100m									R	F

== Medal summary ==
The following is a summary of the medals awarded across all 100 metres events. 2 World records, and a further 6 Paralympic Games records were set during the sixteen finals.

Classification	Gold		Silver		Bronze	
T11	David Brown; United States	10.99	Felipe Gomes; Brazil	11.08	Ananias Shikongo; Namibia	11.11
T12	Leinier Savon Pineda; Cuba	10.97	Ndodomzi Jonathan Ntutu; South Africa	11.09 SB	Thomas Ulbricht; Germany	11.39
T13	Jason Smyth; Ireland	10.64	Johannes Nambala; Namibia	10.78	Chad Perris; Australia	10.83
T33	Ahmad Almutairi; Kuwait	16.61 PR	Toby Gold; Great Britain	17.84	Andrew Small; Great Britain	17.96 PB
T34	Walid Ktila; Tunisia	15.14 PR	Rheed McCracken; Australia	15.34	Henry Manni; Finland	15.46 PB
T35	Ihor Tsvietov; Ukraine	12.31	Fábio da Silva Bordignon; Brazil	12.66	Hernan Barreto; Argentina	12.85 SB
T36	Mohamad Ridzuan Mohamad Puzi; Malaysia	12.07 PR	Yifei Yang; China	12.20 PB	Rodrigo Parreira da Silva; Brazil	12.54
T37	Charl du Toit; South Africa	11.45	Mostafa Fathalla Mohamed; Egypt	11.54	Fanie van der Merwe; South Africa	11.54
T38	Hu Jianwen; China	10.74 WR	Evan O'Hanlon; Australia	10.98 SB	Edson Pinheiro; Brazil	11.26 SB
T42	Scott Reardon; Australia	12.26 PR	Daniel Wagner; Denmark; Richard Whitehead; Great Britain	12.32	—	
T44 (inc. T43)	Jonnie Peacock; Great Britain	10.81 PR	Liam Malone; New Zealand	11.02	Felix Streng; Germany	11.03
T47 (inc T45, T46)	Petrúcio Ferreira dos Santos; Brazil	10.57 WR	Michal Derus; Poland	10.79 SB	Yohansson Nascimento; Brazil	10.79
T51	Peter Genyn; Belgium	21.15 PR	Mohamed Berrahal; Algeria	21.70	Edgar Cesareo Navarro Sanchez; Mexico	21.96 SB
T52	Gianfranco Iannotta; United States	17.17	Raymond Martin; United States	17.25	Salvador Hernandez Mondragon; Mexico	17.69 SB
T53	Brent Lakatos; Canada	14.44	Pongsakorn Paeyo; Thailand	14.80	Huzhao Li; China	14.85 SB
T54	Leo Pekka Tahti; Finland	13.90	Yang Liu; China	14.10 SB	Kenny van Weeghel; Netherlands	14.23

== Results ==
The following were the results of the finals only of each of the Men's 100 metres events in each of the classifications. Further details of each event, including where appropriate heats and semi finals results, are available on that event's dedicated page.

=== T11 ===
The T11 category is for athletes with a visual impairment. A T11 athlete may be entirely without sight, or be able to perceive light, but have no ability to see the shape of a hand at any distance. T11 athletes commonly run with guides.

The final in this classification took place at 19:02, local time, 11 September 2016:

Rank	Lane	Bib	Name	Nationality	Reaction	Time	Notes
1st place, gold medalist(s)	3	2347	David Brown	United States	0.123	10.99	
2nd place, silver medalist(s)	1	1146	Felipe Gomes	Brazil	0.176	11.08	
3rd place, bronze medalist(s)	5	1911	Ananias Shikongo	Namibia	0.199	11.11	
4	7	1241	Dongdong Di	China	0.188	11.32	

=== T12 ===
The T12 category is for athletes with visual impairment. Athletes in this category will generally have some residual sight, the ability to recognise the shape of a hand at a distance of 2 metres and the ability to perceive clearly will be no more than 2/60. T12 athletes commonly run with guides.

The final in this classification took place at 18:10 local time, 15 September 2016:

Rank	Lane	Bib	Name	Nationality	Reaction	Time	Notes
1st place, gold medalist(s)	3	1354	Leinier Savon Pineda	Cuba	0.166	10.97	
2nd place, silver medalist(s)	5	2087	Ndodomzi Jonathan Ntutu	South Africa	0.138	11.09	
3rd place, bronze medalist(s)	7	1553	Thomas Ulbricht	Germany	0.156	11.39	
4	1	1084	Elmir Jabrayilov	Azerbaijan	0.154	11.51	

=== T13 ===
The T13 category is for athletes with a moderate visual impairment. Athletes in this category have a variety of visual impairments, but can typically recognize contours from a distance of 2 to 6 metres. Athletes in this category do not typically require a guide.

Rank	Lane	Name	Nationality	Reaction	Time	Notes
1st place, gold medalist(s)	5	Jason Smyth	Ireland	0.170	10.64	
2nd place, silver medalist(s)	4	Johannes Nambala	Namibia	0.166	10.78	
3rd place, bronze medalist(s)	7	Chad Perris	Australia	0.146	10.83	
4	3	Kesley Teodoro	Brazil	0.155	11.00	PB
5	8	Mateusz Michalski	Poland	0.130	11.01	
6	6	Liu Wei	China	0.164	11.05	
7	9	Radoslav Zlatanov	Bulgaria	0.192	11.38	
8	2	Gustavo Henrique Araújo	Brazil	0.143	11.45	
				Wind: ±0.0 m/s		

=== T33 ===
The final in this classification took place at 22:12, local time, 11 September 2016:

Rank	Lane	Bib	Name	Nationality	Reaction	Time	Notes
1st place, gold medalist(s)	2	1795	Ahmad Almutairi	Kuwait		16.61	
2nd place, silver medalist(s)	4	1505	Toby Gold	Great Britain		17.84	
3rd place, bronze medalist(s)	8	1520	Andrew Small	Great Britain		17.96	
4	6	1499	Daniel Bramall	Great Britain		18.16	
5	5	1798	Naser Saleh	Kuwait		21.22	
6	3	1548	Denis Schmitz	Germany		21.22	
7	7	2369	John Roberts	United States		21.88	

=== T34 ===
The T34 category is for wheelchair athletes with cerebral palsy. Athletes in this category have minimal limitations or control problems in their arms and trunk while pushing a wheelchair.

The final in this classification took place at 18:38, local time, 12 September 2016:

Rank	Lane	Bib	Name	Nationality	Reaction	Time	Notes
1st place, gold medalist(s)	4	2277	Walid Ktila	Tunisia		15.14	
2nd place, silver medalist(s)	5	1057	Rheed McCracken	Australia		15.34	
3rd place, bronze medalist(s)	3	1456	Henry Manni	Finland		15.46	
4	7	2300	Mohamed Alhammadi	United Arab Emirates		15.76	
5	8	2181	Bojan Mitic	Switzerland		15.87	
6	6	1212	Austin Smeenk	Canada		16.21	
7	1	1474	Sebastien Mobre	France		16.47	
8	2	2066	Mohammed Rashid A J Al-Kubaisi	Qatar		16.68	

=== T35 ===
The T35 category is for ambulant athletes with cerebral palsy. The typical T35 athlete may need assistive devices for walking. The athlete may have sufficient function to run but demonstrates poor balance.

The final in this classification took place at 17:30 local time, 9 September 2016:

Rank	Lane	Bib	Name	Nationality	Reaction	Time	Notes
1st place, gold medalist(s)	4	2330	Ihor Tsvietov	Ukraine		12.31	
2nd place, silver medalist(s)	7	1140	Fábio da Silva Bordignon	Brazil		12.66	
3rd place, bronze medalist(s)	5	1034	Hernan Barreto	Argentina		12.85	
4	6	1243	Xinhan Fu	China		13.08	
5	8	2361	Ayden Jent	United States		13.13	
6	2	1032	Nicolas Martin Aravena	Argentina		13.45	
7	9	1036	Diego Martin Gonzalez	Argentina		13.45	
8	3	1962	Jacob Phillips	New Zealand		14.14	

=== T36 ===
The T36 category is for ambulant athletes with cerebral palsy. These athletes do not have the capacity to remain still and they show involuntary movements with all four limbs affected. They usually walk without assistive devices.

The final in this classification took place at 10 September 2016 at 17:38 local time.

Rank	Athlete	Country	Class	Time	Notes
1st place, gold medalist(s)	Mohamad Ridzuan Mohamad Puzi	Malaysia	T36	12.07	PR
2nd place, silver medalist(s)	Yang Yifei	China	T36	12.20	PB
3rd place, bronze medalist(s)	Rodrigo Parreira da Silva	Brazil	T36	12.54	
4	Che Mian	China	T36	12.72	
5	Graeme Ballard	Great Britain	T36	12.84	
6	GDJ Cuadra Holmann	Nicaragua	T36	12.91	PB
7	Xu Ran	China	T36	12.96	
-	Roman Pavlyk	Ukraine	T36	DSQ	

=== T37 ===
The T37 category is for ambulant athletes with cerebral palsy. These athletes have movement and coordination problems on one half of their body. They have good ability in their dominant side of their body (ie hemiplegia).

The final in this classification took place at 10:52, local time, 11 September 2016:

Rank	Lane	Bib	Name	Nationality	Reaction	Time	Notes
1st place, gold medalist(s)	4	2081	Charl du Toit	South Africa		11.45	
2nd place, silver medalist(s)	5	1409	Mostafa Fathalla Mohamed	Egypt		11.54	
3rd place, bronze medalist(s)	7	2091	Fanie van der Merwe	South Africa		11.54	
4	6	1143	Mateus Evangelista Cardoso	Brazil		11.62	
5	8	1255	Guangxu Shang	China		11.76	
6	3	1510	Rhys Jones	Great Britain		11.94	
7	2	2326	Andrii Onufriienko	Ukraine		12.13	
8	9	2409	Omar Monterola	Venezuela		12.13	

=== T38 ===
The T38 category is for ambulant athletes with cerebral palsy. T38 athletes have the mildest form of impairment caused by cerebral palsy, often in only one limb, and not affecting the ability to run, walk or jump freely, although impairing performance. T38 athletes may suffer minor co-ordination difficulties.

The final in this classification took place at 10:43, local time, 13 September 2016:

Rank	Lane	Bib	Name	Nationality	Reaction	Time	Notes
1st place, gold medalist(s)	5	1245	Jianwen Hu	China		10.74	
2nd place, silver medalist(s)	7	1059	Evan O'Hanlon	Australia		10.98	
3rd place, bronze medalist(s)	6	1157	Edson Pinheiro	Brazil		11.26	
4	4	2078	Dyan Neille Buis	South Africa		11.26	
5	9	1274	Wenjun Zhou	China		11.34	
6	3	1272	Huanghao Zhong	China		11.66	
7	2	2273	Mohamed Farhat Chida	Tunisia		11.82	
	8	1304	Weiner Javier Diaz Mosquera	Colombia			DSQ

=== T42 ===
The T42 category is for single above-knee amputees and athletes with other impairments that are comparable to a single above knee amputation, including athletes with loss of muscle power in the lower limbs.

The final in this classification took place at 18:17 local time, 15 September 2016:

Rank	Lane	Bib	Name	Nationality	Reaction	Time	Notes
1st place, gold medalist(s)	4	1061	Scott Reardon	Australia		12.26	
2nd place, silver medalist(s)	6	1382	Daniel Wagner	Denmark		12.32	
2nd place, silver medalist(s)	5	1524	Richard Whitehead	Great Britain		12.32	
4	7	1543	Heinrich Popow	Germany		12.46	
5	9	2085	Ntando Mahlangu	South Africa		12.57	
6	8	2164	Anil Prasanna Jayalath Yodha Pedige	Sri Lanka		12.81	
7	2	1748	Atsushi Yamamoto	Japan		12.84	
8	3	2151	Upul Indika Chuladasa Abarana Gedara	Sri Lanka		12.85	

=== T44 ===
The T44 category is for athletes who have a single below knee amputation or who can walk with moderately reduced function in one or both legs.

The final were completed 10 September 2016 at 00:58 local time. Final (+0.1 m/s).

Rank	Athlete	Country	Class	Time	Notes
1st place, gold medalist(s)	Jonnie Peacock	Great Britain	T44	10.81	PR
2nd place, silver medalist(s)	Liam Malone	New Zealand	T43	11.02	
3rd place, bronze medalist(s)	Felix Streng	Germany	T44	11.03	
4	Arnu Fourie	South Africa	T44	11.11	
5	Jarryd Wallace	United States	T44	11.16	
6	Jerome Singleton	United States	T44	11.17	
7	David Behre	Germany	T43	11.26	
8	Nick Rogers	United States	T43	11.33	

=== T47 ===
The T47 category is for athletes who have a single below elbow or wrist amputation or similar disability, with normal function in both legs.

The final were completed 11 September 2016 at 15:45 local time. Final (0.0 m/s).

Rank	Athlete	Country	Class	Time	Notes
1st place, gold medalist(s)	Petrúcio Ferreira dos Santos	Brazil	T47	10.57	WR
2nd place, silver medalist(s)	Michal Derus	Poland	T47	10.79	SB
3rd place, bronze medalist(s)	Yohansson Nascimento	Brazil	T46	10.79	
4	Hao Wang	China	T46	11.03	
5	Roderick Townsend-Roberts	United States	T46	11.08	
6	Raciel Gonzalez Isidoria	Cuba	T46	11.16	
7	Gabriel Cole	Australia	T47	11.17	
8	Ahmad Ojaghlou	Iran	T46	11.27	

=== T51 ===
The T51 category is for wheelchair athletes having spinal cord injuries, with mild weakness in shoulders, limited ability in straightening elbows and wrist function, and no finger, trunk or leg function.

The final were completed 13 September 2016 at 15:36 local time. Final (-0.4 m/s).

Rank	Athlete	Country	Time	Notes
1st place, gold medalist(s)	Peter Genyn	Belgium	21.15	PR
2nd place, silver medalist(s)	Mohamed Berrahal	Algeria	21.70	
3rd place, bronze medalist(s)	Edgar Cesareo Navarro Sanchez	Mexico	21.91	SB
4	Toni Piispanen	Finland	22.02	
5	Alvise de Vidi	Italy	22.73	SB
6	Stephen Osborne	Great Britain	23.18	
7	Helder Mestre	Portugal	24.35	

=== T53 ===
The T53 category is for wheelchair athletes with normal use of arms and hands, no or limited trunk function, and no leg function.

The final were completed 100 September 2016 at 00:22 local time. Final (-0.1 m/s).

Rank	Athlete	Country	Time	Notes
1st place, gold medalist(s)	Brent Lakatos	Canada	14.44	
2nd place, silver medalist(s)	Pongsakorn Paeyo	Thailand	14.80	
3rd place, bronze medalist(s)	Huzhao Li	China	14.85	SB
4	Ariosvaldo Fernandes Silva	Brazil	14.88	
5	Pierre Fairbank	France	14.96	
6	Mickey Bushell	Great Britain	15.09	
7	Brian Siemann	United States	15.23	
8	Fahad Alganaidl	Saudi Arabia	15.35	

=== T54 ===
The T54 category is for wheelchair athletes with no leg function, but near full arm function and reasonable to normal trunk function. Typically this may be caused by a lower spinal cord injury or spinal cord birth defect.

The final in this classification took place at 19:37 local time, 17 September 2016:

Rank	Lane	Bib	Name	Nationality	Reaction	Time	Notes
1st place, gold medalist(s)	3	1459	Leo Pekka Tahti	Finland		13.90	
2nd place, silver medalist(s)	6	1254	Yang Liu	China		14.10	
3rd place, bronze medalist(s)	5	1930	Kenny van Weeghel	Netherlands		14.23	
4	2	2229	Saichon Konjen	Thailand		14.28	
5	8	1240	Yanfeng Cui	China		14.32	
6	1	1045	Samuel Carter	Australia		14.46	
7	4	2358	Erik Hightower	United States		14.49	
8	7	1736	Yoshifumi Nagao	Japan		14.71	
