= 2017 World Para Athletics Championships – Men's 100 metres =

The men's 100 metres at the 2017 World Para Athletics Championships was held at the Olympic Stadium in London from 14 to 23 July.

== Medalists ==
Event	Gold		Silver		Bronze	
T11	David Brown; Guide: Jerome Avery; United States	11.20	Ananias Shikongo; Guide: Even Tjiviju; Namibia	11.33 PB	Di Dongdong; Guide: Mao Deyi; China	11.55
T12	Leinier Savon Pineda; Cuba	10.72 CR	Ndodomzi Ntutu; South Africa	11.01 SB	Joan Munar Martinez; Spain	11.09 PB
T13	Jason Smyth; Ireland	10.63	Mateusz Michalski; Poland	10.95 SB	Chad Perris; Australia	10.96
T33	Ahmad Almutairi; Kuwait	17.00 CR	Toby Gold; Great Britain	17.62	Andrew Small; Great Britain	17.78
T34	Walid Ktila; Tunisia	15.00 CR	Rheed McCracken; Australia	15.40	Mohamed Alhammadi; United Arab Emirates	15.75 AR
T35	Ihor Tsvietov; Ukraine	12.38 CR	Jordan Howe; Great Britain	12.52 PB	Hernan Barreto; Argentina	12.78 PB
T36	Yang Yifei; China	11.93 AR	Mohamad Ridzuan Mohamad Puzi; Malaysia	12.15 =SB	Rodrigo Parreira da Silva; Brazil	12.28 AR
T37	Mateus Evangelista Cardoso; Brazil	11.48 SB	Charl Du Toit; South Africa	11.55	Vladyslav Zahrebelnyi; Ukraine	11.69 AR
T38	Evan O'Hanlon; Australia	11.07 SB	Hu Jianwen; China	11.07 SB	Edson Pinheiro; Brazil	11.30
T42	Scott Reardon; Australia	12.21	Daniel Wagner; Denmark	12.30 SB	Richard Whitehead; Great Britain	12.39
T44	Jonnie Peacock; Great Britain	10.75	Johannes Floors; Germany	10.89	Jarryd Wallace; United States	10.95
T47	Petrucio Ferreira dos Santos; Brazil	10.53 WR	Yohansson Nascimento; Brazil	10.80 SB	Michal Derus; Poland	10.81 SB
T51	Peter Genyn; Belgium	21.10	Toni Piispanen; Finland	21.54	Mohamed Berrahal; Algeria	22.08
T52	Raymond Martin; United States	16.83 CR	Salvador Hernandez Mondragon; Mexico	17.28 SB	Gianfranco Iannotta; United States	17.54
T53	Brent Lakatos; Canada	14.52	Mickey Bushell; Great Britain	14.85	Pongsakorn Paeyo; Thailand	14.88
T54	Leo Pekka Tahti; Finland	13.95	Liu Yang; China	14.07 SB	Kenny van Weeghel; Netherlands	14.25
WR world record | AR area record | CR championship record | GR games record | NR national record | OR Olympic record | PB personal best | SB season best | WL world leading (in a given season)

Events listed in pink were contested but no medals were awarded.

== Results ==
=== T11 ===
Round 1

Rank	Heat	Sport Class	Name	Nationality	Time	Notes
1	3	T11	David Brown	United States	11.26	Q
2	2	T11	Ananias Shikongo	Namibia	11.37	Q, SB
3	2	T11	Di Dongdong	China	11.41	q, SB
4	3	T11	Fan Zetan	China	11.53	
5	3	T11	Ricardo Costa de Oliveira	Brazil	11.60	SB
6	1	T11	Lex Gillette	United States	11.65	Q, SB
7	2	T11	Martin Parejo Maza	Spain	11.68	SB
8	2	T11	Jose Chamoleia	Angola	11.97	
9	1	T11	Suphachai Songphinit	Thailand	12.11	
10	1	T11	Mehmet Tunc	Turkey	12.19	
11	3	T11	Xavier Porras	Spain	12.38	

Final

Rank	Sport Class	Name	Nationality	Time	Notes
1st place, gold medalist(s)	T11	David Brown	United States	11.20	
2nd place, silver medalist(s)	T11	Ananias Shikongo	Namibia	11.33	SB
3rd place, bronze medalist(s)	T11	Di Dongdong	China	11.55	
4	T11	Lex Gillette	United States	11.60	SB

=== T12 ===
Round 1

Rank	Heat	Sport Class	Name	Nationality	Time	Notes
1	2	T12	Leinier Savon Pineda	Cuba	10.88	Q
2	4	T12	Ndodomzi Ntutu	South Africa	11.05	Q, SB
3	2	T12	Joan Munar Martinez	Spain	11.14	q, PB
4	3	T12	Fabricio Junior Barros Ferreira	Brazil	11.16	Q
5	2	T12	Mahdi Afri	Morocco	11.27	q, PB
6	3	T12	Hilton Langenhoven	South Africa	11.31	q, SB
7	3	T12	Mansur Abdirashidov	Uzbekistan	11.32	q
8	4	T12	Josiah Jamison	United States	11.38	SB
9	2	T12	Athanasios Ghavelas	Greece	11.39	
10	1	T12	Zachary Shaw	Great Britain	11.40	Q
11	1	T12	George Quarcoo	Canada	11.41	PB
12	4	T12	Djamil Nasser	Algeria	11.43	
13	1	T12	Sun Qichao	China	11.51	SB
14	1	T12	Thomas Ulbricht	Germany	11.52	
15	3	T12	Tobias Jonsson	Sweden	11.64	
16	4	T12	Jason Dennis Brown	Jamaica	11.84	

Semifinals

Rank	Heat	Sport Class	Name	Nationality	Time	Notes
1	1	T12	Leinier Savon Pineda	Cuba	10.83	Q
2	2	T12	Ndodomzi Ntutu	South Africa	11.01	Q, SB
3	1	T12	Joan Munar Martinez	Spain	11.06	q, SB
4	2	T12	Fabricio Junior Barros Ferreira	Brazil	11.20	q
5	2	T12	Mahdi Afri	Morocco	11.24	PB
6	1	T12	Hilton Langenhoven	South Africa	11.27	SB
7	1	T12	Zachary Shaw	Great Britain	11.35	
8	2	T12	Mansur Abdirashidov	Uzbekistan	11.38	

Final

Rank	Sport Class	Name	Nationality	Time	Notes
1st place, gold medalist(s)	T12	Leinier Savon Pineda	Cuba	10.72	CR
2nd place, silver medalist(s)	T12	Ndodomzi Ntutu	South Africa	11.01	SB
3rd place, bronze medalist(s)	T12	Joan Munar Martinez	Spain	11.09	PB
4	T12	Fabricio Junior Barros Ferreira	Brazil	11.14	

=== T13 ===
Round 1

Rank	Heat	Sport Class	Name	Nationality	Time	Notes
1	1	T13	Jason Smyth	Ireland	10.73	Q
2	3	T13	Chad Perris	Australia	10.92	Q, SB
3	1	T13	Kesley Teodoro	Brazil	10.94	Q, SB
4	2	T13	Gustavo Henrique Araujo	Brazil	10.97	Q,
4	3	T13	Mateusz Michalski	Poland	10.97	Q, SB
6	2	T13	Johannes Nambala	Namibia	11.04	Q
6	1	T13	Radoslav Zlatanov	Bulgaria	11.04	q
8	3	T13	Philipp Handler	Switzerland	11.14	q, SB
9	1	T13	Zak Skinner	Great Britain	11.15	PB
10	3	T13	Mohamed Khatabou	Morocco	11.26	
11	2	T13	Jakub Nicpon	Poland	11.30	
12	2	T13	Liu Wei	China	11.43	SB
13	2	T13	Axel Zorzi	France	11.46	PB
14	1	T13	Chadwick Campbell	Jamaica	11.49	
15	3	T13	Octavian Vasile Tucaliuc	Romania	11.62	PB
16	1	T13	Vegard Dragsund Nilsen	Norway	11.68	SB
17	3	T13	Shakir Al-Gburi	Iraq	11.72	PB
18	1	T13	Islam Salimov	Kazakhstan	11.94	PB
19	2	T13	Iván José Cano Blanco	Spain	12.19	SB

Final

Rank	Sport Class	Name	Nationality	Time	Notes
1st place, gold medalist(s)	T13	Jason Smyth	Ireland	10.63	
2nd place, silver medalist(s)	T13	Mateusz Michalski	Poland	10.95	SB
3rd place, bronze medalist(s)	T13	Chad Perris	Australia	10.96	
4	T13	Johannes Nambala	Namibia	11.00	
5	T13	Kesley Teodoro	Brazil	11.04	
6	T13	Radoslav Zlatanov	Bulgaria	11.06	
7	T13	Philipp Handler	Switzerland	11.25	
—	T13	Gustavo Henrique Araujo	Brazil	DQ	

=== T33 ===
Final

Rank	Sport Class	Name	Nationality	Time	Notes
1st place, gold medalist(s)	T33	Ahmad Almutairi	Kuwait	17.00	CR
2nd place, silver medalist(s)	T33	Toby Gold	Great Britain	17.62	
3rd place, bronze medalist(s)	T33	Andrew Small	Great Britain	17.78	
4	T33	Daniel Bramall	Great Britain	17.79	

=== T34 ===
Round 1

Rank	Heat	Sport Class	Name	Nationality	Time	Notes
1	2	T34	Walid Ktila	Tunisia	15.15	Q, CR
2	1	T34	Rheed McCracken	Australia	15.60	Q, CR
3	1	T34	Austin Smeenk	Canada	15.88	Q, AR
4	1	T34	Henry Manni	Finland	15.99	Q
5	2	T34	Mohamed Alhammadi	United Arab Emirates	16.05	Q
6	2	T34	Bojan Mitic	Switzerland	16.31	Q
7	1	T34	Mohammed Rashid Al-Kubaisi	Qatar	16.70	q, SB
8	1	T34	Austin Pruitt	United States	16.72	q, SB
8	2	T34	Stefan Rusch	Netherlands	16.72	
10	2	T34	Khalid Hamad Al-Hajri	Qatar	18.67	PB

Final

Rank	Sport Class	Name	Nationality	Time	Notes
1st place, gold medalist(s)	T34	Walid Ktila	Tunisia	15.00	CR
2nd place, silver medalist(s)	T34	Rheed McCracken	Australia	15.40	
3rd place, bronze medalist(s)	T34	Mohamed Alhammadi	United Arab Emirates	15.75	AR
4	T34	Austin Smeenk	Canada	15.85	AR
5	T34	Henry Manni	Finland	15.88	SB
6	T34	Bojan Mitic	Switzerland	16.40	
7	T34	Austin Pruitt	United States	16.78	
8	T34	Mohammed Rashid Al-Kubaisi	Qatar	16.98	

=== T35 ===
Final

Rank	Sport Class	Name	Nationality	Time	Notes
1st place, gold medalist(s)	T35	Ihor Tsvietov	Ukraine	12.38	CR
2nd place, silver medalist(s)	T35	Jordan Howe	Great Britain	12.52	PB
3rd place, bronze medalist(s)	T35	Hernan Barreto	Argentina	12.78	PB
4	T35	Fabio Da Silva Bordignon	Brazil	12.83	
5	T35	Marshall Zackery	United States	12.98	
6	T35	Diego Martin Gonzalez	Argentina	13.00	PB
7	T35	Ayden Jent	United States	13.24	
8	T35	Nicolas Martin Aravena	Argentina	13.53	

=== T36 ===
Round 1

Rank	Heat	Sport Class	Name	Nationality	Time	Notes
1	1	T36	Mohamad Ridzuan Mohamad Puzi	Malaysia	12.29	Q
1	2	T36	Yang Yifei	China	12.29	Q, SB
3	1	T36	Rodrigo Parreira da Silva	Brazil	12.61	Q, SB
4	2	T36	Graeme Ballard	Great Britain	12.66	Q
5	1	T36	Roman Pavlyk	Ukraine	12.83	Q
6	1	T36	Paul Blake	Great Britain	12.85	q
7	2	T36	Krzysztof Ciuksza	Poland	12.94	Q
8	2	T36	Brayden Davidson	Australia	13.13	q
9	1	T36	Gabriel de Jesus Cuadra Holman	Nicaragua	13.28	
10	2	T36	Loukas Ioannis Protonotarios	Greece	13.51	PB

Final

Rank	Sport Class	Name	Nationality	Time	Notes
1st place, gold medalist(s)	T36	Yang Yifei	China	11.93	AR
2nd place, silver medalist(s)	T36	Mohamad Ridzuan Mohamad Puzi	Malaysia	12.15	
3rd place, bronze medalist(s)	T36	Rodrigo Parreira da Silva	Brazil	12.28	AR
4	T36	Graeme Ballard	Great Britain	12.55	
5	T36	Roman Pavlyk	Ukraine	12.57	SB
6	T36	Paul Blake	Great Britain	12.59	
7	T36	Krzysztof Ciuksza	Poland	12.70	PB
8	T36	Brayden Davidson	Australia	13.29	

=== T37 ===
Round 1

Rank	Heat	Sport Class	Name	Nationality	Time	Notes
1	1	T37	Charl du Toit	South Africa	11.68	Q, SB
2	1	T37	Rhys Jones	Great Britain	11.69	Q
3	2	T37	Vladyslav Zahrebelnyi	Ukraine	11.72	Q, PB
4	2	T37	Mateus Evangelista Cardoso	Brazil	11.74	Q,
5	2	T37	Mostafa Fathalla Mohamed	Egypt	11.85	Q, SB
6	2	T37	Ruhan van Rooyen	South Africa	12.41	q
7	2	T37	Matuesz Owczarek	Poland	12.54	q, SB
8	1	T37	Odysseas Moulas	Greece	12.66	Q
9	1	T37	Amanat Kalkayev	Kazakhstan	12.79	PB
10	2	T37	Iasonas Gantes	Greece	14.39	
—	1	T37	Mario Tataren	Argentina	DQ	
—	1	T37	Sajjad Alwahhah	Iraq	DQ	

Final

Rank	Sport Class	Name	Nationality	Time	Notes
1st place, gold medalist(s)	T37	Mateus Evangelista Cardoso	Brazil	11.48	SB
2nd place, silver medalist(s)	T37	Charl du Toit	South Africa	11.55	SB
3rd place, bronze medalist(s)	T37	Vladyslav Zahrebelnyi	Ukraine	11.69	PB
4	T37	Mostafa Fathalla Mohamed	Egypt	11.78	SB
5	T37	Rhys Jones	Great Britain	11.88	
6	T37	Ruhan van Rooyen	South Africa	12.56	
7	T37	Mateusz Owczarek	Poland	12.57	
8	T37	Odysseas Moulas	Greece	12.83	

=== T38 ===
Round 1

Rank	Heat	Sport Class	Name	Nationality	Time	Notes
1	2	T38	Hu Jianwen	China	11.15	Q, SB
2	1	T38	Edson Pinheiro	Brazil	11.38	Q
3	2	T38	Dyan Buis	South Africa	11.52	Q
4	2	T38	Mykyta Senyk	Ukraine	11.54	Q
5	1	T38	Evan O'Hanlon	Australia	11.60	Q
6	2	T38	Kyle Whitehouse	Canada	11.72	q
7	1	T38	Zhong Huanghao	China	11.76	Q, SB
8	1	T38	Dimitri Jozwicki	France	11.78	q
9	1	T38	Dixon De Jesus Hooker Velasquez	Colombia	11.97	
10	2	T38	Lorenzo Albaladejo Martinez	Spain	12.02	SB
11	1	T38	Union Sekailwe	South Africa	12.13	
12	1	T38	Weiner Javier Diaz Mosquera	Colombia	12.54	
13	1	T38	Davit Kavtaradze	Georgia	12.59	
14	2	T38	Luis Fernando Lucumí Villegas	Colombia	12.88	
15	2	T38	Luis Prado	Nicaragua	13.58	

Final

Rank	Sport Class	Name	Nationality	Time	Notes
1st place, gold medalist(s)	T38	Evan O'Hanlon	Australia	11.07	SB
2nd place, silver medalist(s)	T38	Hu Jianwen	China	11.08	SB
3rd place, bronze medalist(s)	T38	Edson Pinheiro	Brazil	11.30	
4	T38	Dyan Buis	South Africa	11.37	SB
5	T38	Mykyta Senyk	Ukraine	11.58	
6	T38	Zhong Huanghao	China	11.64	PB
7	T38	Dimitri Jozwicki	France	11.77	
8	T38	Kyle Whitehouse	Canada	11.84	

=== T42 ===
Round 1

Rank	Heat	Sport Class	Name	Nationality	Time	Notes
1	1	T42	Richard Whitehead	Great Britain	12.35	Q
2	2	T42	Daniel Wagner	Denmark	12.37	Q, SB
3	1	T42	Leon Schaefer	Germany	12.48	Q, PB
4	2	T42	Scott Reardon	Australia	12.53	q
5	1	T42	Anil Prasanna Jayalath Yodha Pedige	Sri Lanka	12.69	Q
6	2	T42	Desmond Jackson	United States	12.84	Q
7	2	T42	Atsushi Yamamoto	Japan	12.92	q
8	1	T42	Regas Woods	United States	13.18	q, PB
9	2	T42	David Henson	Great Britain	13.27	SB
10	1	T42	Ntando Mahlangu	South Africa	29.97	
—	2	T42	Nurullah Kart	Turkey	DQ	

Final

Rank	Sport Class	Name	Nationality	Time	Notes
1st place, gold medalist(s)	T42	Scott Reardon	Australia	12.21	
2nd place, silver medalist(s)	T42	Daniel Wagner	Denmark	12.30	SB
3rd place, bronze medalist(s)	T42	Richard Whitehead	Great Britain	12.39	
4	T42	Leon Schaefer	Germany	12.43	PB
5	T42	Desmond Jackson	United States	12.84	
6	T42	Atsushi Yamamoto	Japan	13.08	
7	T42	Regas Woods	United States	13.23	
—	T42	Anil Prasanna Jayalath Yodha Pedige	Sri Lanka	DQ	

=== T44 ===
Round 1

Rank	Heat	Sport Class	Name	Nationality	Time	Notes
1	1	T44	Jonnie Peacock	Great Britain	10.64	Q, AR
2	2	T44	Jarryd Wallace	United States	10.82	Q, SB
3	1	T43	Johannes Floors	Germany	10.89	Q
4	1	T44	Jerome Singleton	United States	10.98	Q, PB
5	2	T44	Arnu Fourie	South Africa	11.13	Q, SB
6	1	T44	Michail Seitis	Greece	11.16	q, PB
7	1	T44	Mpumelelo Mhlongo	South Africa	11.31	q, PB
8	2	T43	Andrea Lanfri	Italy	11.46	q, PB
9	2	T44	Keita Sato	Japan	12.17	
10	2	T44	Mikio Ikeda	Japan	12.21	PB
11	1	T44	Alberto Avila Chamorro	Spain	12.26	

Final

Rank	Sport Class	Name	Nationality	Time	Notes
1st place, gold medalist(s)	T44	Jonnie Peacock	Great Britain	10.75	
2nd place, silver medalist(s)	T43	Johannes Floors	Germany	10.89	
3rd place, bronze medalist(s)	T44	Jarryd Wallace	United States	10.95	
4	T44	Jerome Singleton	United States	11.08	
5	T44	Arnu Fourie	South Africa	11.19	
6	T44	Michail Seitis	Greece	11.25	
7	T44	Mpumelelo Mhlongo	South Africa	11.45	
8	T43	Andrea Lanfri	Italy	11.57	

=== T47 ===
Round 1

Rank	Heat	Sport Class	Name	Nationality	Time	Notes
1	1	T47	Petrucio Ferreira dos Santos	Brazil	10.67	Q, CR
2	2	T47	Michal Derus	Poland	10.87	Q
3	2	T46	Yohansson Nascimento	Brazil	10.91	Q, SB
4	2	T46	Tanner Wright	United States	11.02	Q, PB
5	1	T46	Wang Hao	China	11.11	Q
6	1	T46	Roderick Townsend-Roberts	United States	11.15	Q, SB
7	2	T46	Braian Nahuel Villarreal	Argentina	11.37	q
8	1	T47	Tomoki Tagawa	Japan	11.38	q
9	2	T47	Andonis Aresti	Cyprus	11.45	
10	2	T47	Jack Briggs	United States	11.66	
11	1	T46	Tevaughn Kevin Thomas	Jamaica	11.67	
12	1	T47	Antoan Bozhilov	Bulgaria	11.69	
13	2	T47	Hajimu Ashida	Japan	11.80	
14	1	T47	Christos Koutoulias	Greece	12.14	
15	2	T47	Ahmed Al Ksso	IPA	12.18	SB

Final

Rank	Sport Class	Name	Nationality	Time	Notes
1st place, gold medalist(s)	T47	Petrucio Ferreira dos Santos	Brazil	10.53	WR
2nd place, silver medalist(s)	T46	Yohansson Nascimento	Brazil	10.80	SB
3rd place, bronze medalist(s)	T47	Michal Derus	Poland	10.81	SB
4	T46	Tanner Wright	United States	11.05	
5	T46	Wang Hao	China	11.11	
6	T46	Roderick Townsend-Roberts	United States	11.22	
7	T46	Braian Nahuel Villarreal	Argentina	11.34	PB
8	T47	Tomoki Tagawa	Japan	11.54	

=== T51 ===
Final

Rank	Sport Class	Name	Nationality	Time	Notes
1st place, gold medalist(s)	T51	Peter Genyn	Belgium	21.10	
2nd place, silver medalist(s)	T51	Toni Piispanen	Finland	21.54	
3rd place, bronze medalist(s)	T51	Mohamed Berrahal	Algeria	22.08	
4	T51	Edgar Cesareo Navarro Sanchez	Mexico	23.49	
5	T51	Helder Mestre	Portugal	23.81	
6	T51	Alvise de Vidi	Italy	24.17	SB
7	T51	Ernesto Fonseca	Costa Rica	25.72	
8	T51	João Correia	Portugal	27.73	

=== T52 ===
Round 1

Rank	Heat	Sport Class	Name	Nationality	Time	Notes
1	2	T52	Gianfranco Iannotta	United States	17.61	Q
2	1	T52	Raymond Martin	United States	17.62	Q
3	1	T52	Salvador Hernandez Mondragon	Mexico	17.94	Q, SB
4	1	T52	Beat Bosch	Switzerland	18.14	Q
5	2	T52	Mario Trindade	Portugal	18.42	Q
6	2	T52	Leonardo de Jesus Perez Juarez	Mexico	18.45	Q
7	2	T52	Sam McIntosh	Australia	18.61	q
8	1	T52	Jeong Jongdae	South Korea	18.94	q, SB
9	1	T52	Peth Rungsri	Thailand	19.42	
10	2	T52	Thomas Geierspichler	Austria	19.43	

Final

Rank	Sport Class	Name	Nationality	Time	Notes
1st place, gold medalist(s)	T52	Raymond Martin	United States	16.83	CR
2nd place, silver medalist(s)	T52	Salvador Hernandez Mondragon	Mexico	17.28	SB
3rd place, bronze medalist(s)	T52	Gianfranco Iannotta	United States	17.54	
4	T52	Beat Bosch	Switzerland	18.00	
5	T52	Mario Trindade	Portugal	18.23	
6	T52	Sam McIntosh	Australia	18.69	
7	T52	Leonardo De Jesus Perez Juarez	Mexico	18.80	
8	T52	Jeong Jongdae	South Korea	19.60	

=== T53 ===
Round 1

Rank	Heat	Sport Class	Name	Nationality	Time	Notes
1	1	T53	Brent Lakatos	Canada	14.98	Q
2	2	T53	Pongsakorn Paeyo	Thailand	14.99	Q
3	2	T53	Mickey Bushell	Great Britain	15.07	Q
4	1	T53	Pierre Fairbank	France	15.12	Q
5	1	T53	Ariosvaldo Fernandes Silva	Brazil	15.15	Q
6	2	T53	Brian Siemann	United States	15.45	Q
7	1	T53	Yoo Byunghoon	South Korea	15.64	q, PB
8	2	T53	Fahad Alganaidl	Saudi Arabia	15.77	q
9	2	T53	Jung Dong Ho	South Korea	15.79	SB
10	2	T53	Nicolas Brignone	France	15.95	
11	1	T53	Zhao Yufei	China	16.17	
12	1	T53	Pichet Krungget	Thailand	16.26	
13	1	T53	Sopa Intasen	Thailand	16.40	

Final

Rank	Sport Class	Name	Nationality	Time	Notes
1st place, gold medalist(s)	T53	Brent Lakatos	Canada	14.52	
2nd place, silver medalist(s)	T53	Mickey Bushell	Great Britain	14.85	
3rd place, bronze medalist(s)	T53	Pongsakorn Paeyo	Thailand	14.88	
4	T53	Pierre Fairbank	France	15.04	
5	T53	Ariosvaldo Fernandes Silva	Brazil	15.10	
6	T53	Brian Siemann	United States	15.38	
7	T53	Fahad Alganaidl	Saudi Arabia	15.50	
8	T53	Yoo Byunghoon	South Korea	15.56	PB

=== T54 ===
Round 1

Rank	Heat	Sport Class	Name	Nationality	Time	Notes
1	2	T54	Leo Pekka Tahti	Finland	13.92	Q
2	1	T54	Liu Yang	China	14.09	Q, SB
3	1	T54	Kenny van Weeghel	Netherlands	14.26	Q
4	1	T54	Saichon Konjen	Thailand	14.45	Q
4	2	T54	Erik Hightower	United States	14.45	Q
6	1	T54	Tomoki Ikoma	Japan	14.70	q
7	2	T54	Marc Schuh	Germany	14.75	Q
7	2	T54	Curtis Thom	Canada	14.75	q
9	1	T54	Esa-Pekka Mattila	Finland	15.09	
10	2	T54	Ekkachai Janthon	Thailand	15.10	SB
11	1	T54	David Scherer	Germany	15.11	
12	2	T54	Yuki Nishi	Japan	15.16	
13	1	T54	Niklas Almers	Sweden	15.17	
14	1	T54	Isaiah Christophe	Canada	15.38	
15	2	T54	Adil Alblooshi	United Arab Emirates	15.47	
16	1	T54	Fahad Mohammad	United Arab Emirates	15.48	
17	2	T54	Jabari Knight	Trinidad and Tobago	17.16	

Final

Rank	Sport Class	Name	Nationality	Time	Notes
1st place, gold medalist(s)	T54	Leo Pekka Tahti	Finland	13.95	
2nd place, silver medalist(s)	T54	Liu Yang	China	14.07	SB
3rd place, bronze medalist(s)	T54	Kenny van Weeghel	Netherlands	14.25	
4	T54	Saichon Konjen	Thailand	14.54	
5	T54	Erik Hightower	United States	14.62	
6	T54	Marc Schuh	Germany	14.66	SB
7	T54	Curtis Thom	Canada	14.78	
8	T54	Tomoki Ikoma	Japan	14.86	

== See also ==
- List of IPC world records in athletics
