= Athletics at the 2020 Summer Paralympics – Men's 100 metres T33 =

Men's 100 metres T33 at the XVI Paralympic Games
- Venue: Tokyo National Stadium
- Dates: 30 August 2021 (final)
- Competitors: 5 from 3 nations
- Winning time: 17.73

Medalists
1st place, gold medalist(s)		Andrew Small	Great Britain
2nd place, silver medalist(s)		Ahmad Al-Mutairi	Kuwait
3rd place, bronze medalist(s)		Harri Jenkins	Great Britain

Men's 100 metres
T11 · T12 · T13 · T33 · T34 · T35 · T36 · T37 · T38 · T47 · T51 · T52 · T53 · T54 · T63 · T64

The men's 100 metres T33 event at the 2020 Summer Paralympics in Tokyo, took place on 30 August 2021.

The T33 category is for wheelchair athletes with cerebral palsy. Athletes in this class have moderate quadriplegia, and difficulty with forward trunk movement. They also may have hypertonia, ataxia and athetosis.

== Records ==
Prior to the competition, the existing records were as follows:

World Record	John Stephen (TAN)	16.24	Dar es Salaam, Tanzania	13 June 2003
Paralympic Record	Ahmad Al-Mutairi (KUW)	16.61	Rio de Janeiro, Brazil	10 September 2016

Area	Time	Athlete	Nation
Africa	16.24 WR	John Stephen	Tanzania
America	18.36	Joseph Radmore	Canada
Asia	16.46	Ahmad Al-Mutairi	Kuwait
Europe	16.98	Andrew Small	Great Britain
Oceania	19.90	Lachlan Jones	Australia

== Results ==
The final took place on 30 August 2021, at 10:33:

Rank	Lane	Name	Nationality	Time	Notes
1st place, gold medalist(s)	4	Andrew Small	Great Britain	17.73	
2nd place, silver medalist(s)	5	Ahmad Al-Mutairi	Kuwait	17.83	SB
3rd place, bronze medalist(s)	6	Harri Jenkins	Great Britain	18.55	SB
4	7	James Freeman	Great Britain	19.69	
5	3	Yuhei Yasuno	Japan	22.34	
