= Athletics at the 2016 Summer Paralympics – Men's 100 metres T33 =

Men's 100 metres T33 at the XV Paralympic Games
- Venue: Estádio Olímpico João Havelange
- Dates: 10 September 2016
- Competitors: 7 from 4 nations

Medalists
| 1st place, gold medalist(s) | | Ahmad Almutairi | Kuwait |
| 2nd place, silver medalist(s) | | Toby Gold | Great Britain |
| 3rd place, bronze medalist(s) | | Andrew Small | Great Britain |

The Athletics at the 2016 Summer Paralympics – Men's 100 metres T33 event at the 2016 Paralympic Games took place on 10 September 2016, at the Estádio Olímpico João Havelange.

== Final ==
22:12 10 September 2016

| Rank | Lane | Bib | Name | Nationality | Reaction | Time | Notes |
|---|---|---|---|---|---|---|---|
| 1st place, gold medalist(s) | 2 | 1795 | Ahmad Almutairi | Kuwait | | 16.61 | |
| 2nd place, silver medalist(s) | 4 | 1505 | Toby Gold | Great Britain | | 17.84 | |
| 3rd place, bronze medalist(s) | 8 | 1520 | Andrew Small | Great Britain | | 17.96 | |
| 4 | 6 | 1499 | Dan Bramall | Great Britain | | 18.16 | |
| 5 | 5 | 1798 | Naser Saleh | Kuwait | | 21.22 | |
| 6 | 3 | 1548 | Denis Schmitz | Germany | | 21.22 | |
| 7 | 7 | 2369 | John Roberts | United States | | 21.88 | |
