= Andrew Small =

British Paralympic athlete

Andrew Small MBE
Personal information
- Nationality: British
- Born: 6 January 1993 (age 33)

Sport
- Country: Great Britain
- Sport: Track and field
- Disability class: T33
- Club: Stockport Harriers
- Coached by: Rick Hoskins (club); Paula Dunn (national)
Medal record
Men's athletics
Representing Great Britain
Summer Paralympics
Gold medal – first place	2020 Tokyo	100m - T33
Bronze medal – third place	2016 Rio	100m - T33
World Championships
Silver medal – second place	2017 London	100 m T33

Andrew Small (born 6 January 1993) is a British Paralympic athlete who competes in sprint and middle-distance events in the T33 classification.

== Personal history ==
Small was born in England in 1993. Small had nerve damage which affects him both neurologically and physically. He lives in Nantwich, Cheshire. He attended Pilgrim's Way Primary in Canterbury, Brine Leas School and subsequently South Cheshire College.

== Athletics career ==
Small was inspired to take up athletics after watching the 2012 Summer Paralympics in London. From 2013 he began competing at national meets mainly competing in 100 and 200 metres sprints. The following year he competed at his first overseas IPC Grand Prix, in Nottwil in Switzerland. In 2016 he took part in the European Championships at Grosseto, entering the 100 metres (T33). Despite finishing third behind Great Britain teammates Toby Gold and Dan Bramall, he was not awarded a bronze due to a lack of other competitors.

In July 2016 Small was announced as a member of the Great Britain team to compete at the Rio Paralympics. He took part in the 100 metres (T33) sprint, finishing third in a personal best time of 17.96 seconds.

Small was appointed Member of the Order of the British Empire (MBE) in the 2022 New Year Honours for services to athletics.
