= 2015 IPC Athletics World Championships – Men's 100 metres =

The men's 100 metres at the 2015 IPC Athletics World Championships was held at the Suheim Bin Hamad Stadium in Doha from 22–31 October.

== Medalists ==
Event	Gold		Silver		Bronze	
T11	David Brown; Guide:Jerome Avery; United States	11.03	Felipe Gomes; Guide:Jorge Augusto Pereira Borges; Brazil	11.28	Di Dongdong; Guide:Wang Lin; China	11.35
T12	Leinier Savon Pineda; Cuba	10.82	Artem Loginov; Russia	10.99	Fedor Trikolich; Russia	11.07
T13	Jason Smyth; Ireland	10.62	Gustavo Henrique Araújo; Brazil	10.90	Chad Perris; Australia	10.96
T33	Ahmad Almutairi; Kuwait	17.53 CR	Dan Bramall; Great Britain	18.98	Toby Gold; Great Britain	19.27
T34	Walid Ktila; Tunisia	15.75 CR	Mohamed Hammadi; United Arab Emirates	15.92 AR	Bojan Mitic; Switzerland	16.17
T35	Dmitrii Safronov; Russia	12.67	Artem Kalashian; Russia	12.78	Fu Xinhan; China	12.90
T36	Mohamad Ridzuan Mohamad Puzi; Malaysia	12.08	Evgenii Torsunov; Russia	12.17 PB	Roman Pavlyk; Ukraine	12.35 SB
T37	Andrey Vdovin; Russia	11.46 WR	Fanie van der Merwe; South Africa	11.55 SB	Chermen Kobesov; Russia	11.60
T38	Hu Jianwen; China	11.08 AR	Edson Pinheiro; Brazil	11.23 AR	Zhou Wenjun; China	11.37 SB
T42	Scott Reardon; Australia	12.13 CR	Anton Prokhorov; Russia	12.24 PB	Daniel Jorgensen; Denmark	12.47
T44	Richard Browne (T44); United States	10.61 WR	Arnu Fourie (T44); South Africa	10.93 AR	Alan Oliveira (T43); Brazil	11.02
T47	Michal Derus (T47); Poland	10.73 CR	Yohansson Nascimento (T46); Brazil	10.99 SB	Wang Hao (T46); China	11.06
T51	Peter Genyn; Belgium	20.93 CR	Toni Piispanen; Finland	21.43	Mohamed Berrahal; Algeria	21.89 AR
T52	Raymond Martin; United States	17.36	Salvador Hernandez Mondragon; Mexico	17.83	Beat Boesch; Switzerland	17.84
T53	Brent Lakatos; Canada	14.38 CR	Li Huzhao; China	14.84	Pierre Fairbanks; France	15.21
T54	Liu Yang; China	13.77 AR	Leo Pekka Tahti; Finland	13.84 SB	Kenny van Weeghel; Netherlands	13.92 SB
WR world record | AR area record | CR championship record | GR games record | NR national record | OR Olympic record | PB personal best | SB season best | WL world leading (in a given season)

== See also ==
- List of IPC world records in athletics
