= Athletics at the 2015 Parapan American Games – Men's 200 metres T38 =

Athletics – Men's 200 metres T38 at the 2015 Parapan American Games
- Venue: CIBC Athletics Stadium
- Dates: August 13
- Competitors: 5 from 4 nations

Medalists
1st place, gold medalist(s)		Kyle Whitehouse	Canada
2nd place, silver medalist(s)		Dixon de Jesus Hooker Velasquez	Colombia
3rd place, bronze medalist(s)		Edson Pinheiro	Brazil

The men's T38 200 metres competition of the athletics events at the 2015 Parapan American Games was held on August 13 at the CIBC Athletics Stadium. The defending Parapan American Games champion was Edson Pinheiro of Brazil.

== Records ==
Prior to this competition, the existing records were as follows:

World record	Evan O'Hanlon (AUS)	21.82	London, Great Britain	8 September 2012
Americas record	Edson Pinheiro (BRA)	23.25	Lyon, France	24 July 2013

=== Records Broken ===
Parapan Am Record	Kyle Whitehouse (CAN)	23.66	Toronto, Canada	13 August 2015

== Schedule ==
All times are Central Standard Time (UTC-6).

Date	Time	Round
13 August	15:52	Semifinal 1
13 August	15:57	Semifinal 2
13 August	16:52	Final

== Results ==
All times are shown in seconds.

KEY:	q	Fastest non-qualifiers	Q	Qualified	PR	Parapan American Games record	AR	Area record	NR	National record	PB	Personal best	SB	Seasonal best	DSQ	Disqualified	FS	False start

=== Semifinals ===
The fastest three from each heat and next two overall fastest qualified for the final.

==== Semifinal 1 ====
Wind: -2.4 m/s

Rank	Name	Nation	Time	Notes
1	Weiner Javier Diaz Mosquera	Colombia	24.82	Q
2	Edson Pinheiro	Brazil	25.33	Q
3	Jesus Cortes Roman	Mexico	26.58	Q
4	Carlos Castillo	Nicaragua	27.52	q

==== Semifinal 2 ====
Wind: -1.9 m/s

Rank	Name	Nation	Time	Notes
1	Kyle Whitehouse	Canada	23.95	Q, =PR
2	Dixon de Jesus Hooker Velasquez	Colombia	24.13	Q, PB
3	Pedro Neves da Silva	Brazil	24.89	Q, SB
4	Luis Alejandro Prado Guerrero	Nicaragua	26.73	q, PB
	Dalmiro Geliz	Colombia	DSQ	Did not start

=== Final ===
Wind: -0.6 m/s

Rank	Name	Nation	Time	Notes
1st place, gold medalist(s)	Kyle Whitehouse	Canada	23.66	PR
2nd place, silver medalist(s)	Dixon de Jesus Hooker Velasquez	Colombia	23.80	PB
3rd place, bronze medalist(s)	Edson Pinheiro	Brazil	24.11	SB
4	Weiner Javier Diaz Mosquera	Colombia	24.18	SB
5	Pedro Neves da Silva	Brazil	24.99	
6	Jesus Cortes Roman	Mexico	25.93	
7	Luis Alejandro	Nicaragua	26.98	
8	Carlos Castillo	Nicaragua	27.24	
