= Athletics at the 2020 Summer Paralympics – Men's 100 metres T13 =

Men's 100 metres T13 at the XVI Paralympic Games
- Venue: Tokyo National Stadium
- Dates: 29 August 2021 (final)
- Competitors: 17 from 15 nations
- Winning time: 10.53

Medalists
1st place, gold medalist(s)		Jason Smyth	Ireland
2nd place, silver medalist(s)		Skander Djamil Athmani	Algeria
3rd place, bronze medalist(s)		Jean Carlos Mina Aponzá	Colombia

Men's 100 metres
T11 · T12 · T13 · T33 · T34 · T35 · T36 · T37 · T38 · T47 · T51 · T52 · T53 · T54 · T63 · T64

The men's 100 metres T13 event at the 2020 Summer Paralympics in Tokyo, took place on 29 August 2021.

The event was won for the fourth consecutive time by the legendary Irish T13 athlete Jason Smyth in his final Games.

The T13 category is for athletes with a moderate visual impairment. Athletes in this category have a variety of visual impairments, but can typically recognize contours from a distance of 2 to 6 metres. Athletes in this category do not typically require a guide.

== Records ==
Prior to the competition, the existing records were as follows:

World Record	Jason Smyth (IRL)	10.46	London, United Kingdom	1 September 2012
Paralympic Record	Jason Smyth (IRL)	10.46	London, United Kingdom	1 September 2012

Area	Time	Athlete	Nation
Africa	10.54	Skander Djamil Athmani	Algeria
America	10.69	Stirley Jones	United States
Asia	11.03	Liu Wei	China
Europe	10.46 WR	Jason Smyth	Ireland
Oceania	10.83	Chad Perris	Australia

== Results ==
=== Heats ===
Heat 1 took place on 29 August 2021, at 12:28:

Rank	Lane	Name	Nationality	Time	Notes
1	7	Skander Djamil Athmani	Algeria	10.59	Q, AR
2	8	Chad Perris	Australia	10.90	Q
3	5	Philipp Handler	Switzerland	10.97	q, PB
4	3	Zak Skinner	Great Britain	11.14	q
5	4	Youssouf Coulibaly	Mali	11.52	
6	6	Ken Thepthida	Laos	11.72	PB

Heat 2 took place on 29 August 2021, at 12:35:

Rank	Lane	Name	Nationality	Time	Notes
1	6	Jason Smyth	Ireland	10.74	Q, SB
2	7	Isaac Jean-Paul	United States	10.86	Q, PB
3	3	Buinder Bermúdez	Colombia	11.36	PB
4	5	Salah Khelaifia	Algeria	11.48	SB
5	4	Elmir Jabrayilov	Azerbaijan	DNF	

Heat 3 took place on 29 August 2021, at 12:42:

Rank	Lane	Name	Nationality	Time	Notes
1	7	Johannes Nambala	Namibia	11.03	Q, SB
2	5	Jean Carlos Mina Aponzá	Colombia	11.08	Q
3	8	Vahid Alinajimi	Iran	11.18	PB
4	4	Austin Ingram	Canada	11.21	SB
5	6	Bacou Dambakate	Guinea	12.24	
6	3	Ferdinand Compaore	Burkina Faso	DQ	WPA 17.8

=== Final ===
The final took place on 29 August 2021, at 19:53:

Rank	Lane	Name	Nationality	Time	Notes
1st place, gold medalist(s)	6	Jason Smyth	Ireland	10.53	SB
2nd place, silver medalist(s)	7	Skander Djamil Athmani	Algeria	10.54	AR
3rd place, bronze medalist(s)	8	Jean Carlos Mina Aponzá	Colombia	10.64	AR
4	4	Isaac Jean-Paul	United States	10.83	PB
5	9	Chad Perris	Australia	10.84	
6	5	Johannes Nambala	Namibia	10.93	SB
7	2	Philipp Handler	Switzerland	11.02	
8	3	Zak Skinner	Great Britain	11.08	
