= Jarryd Wallace =

American Paralympic sprinter

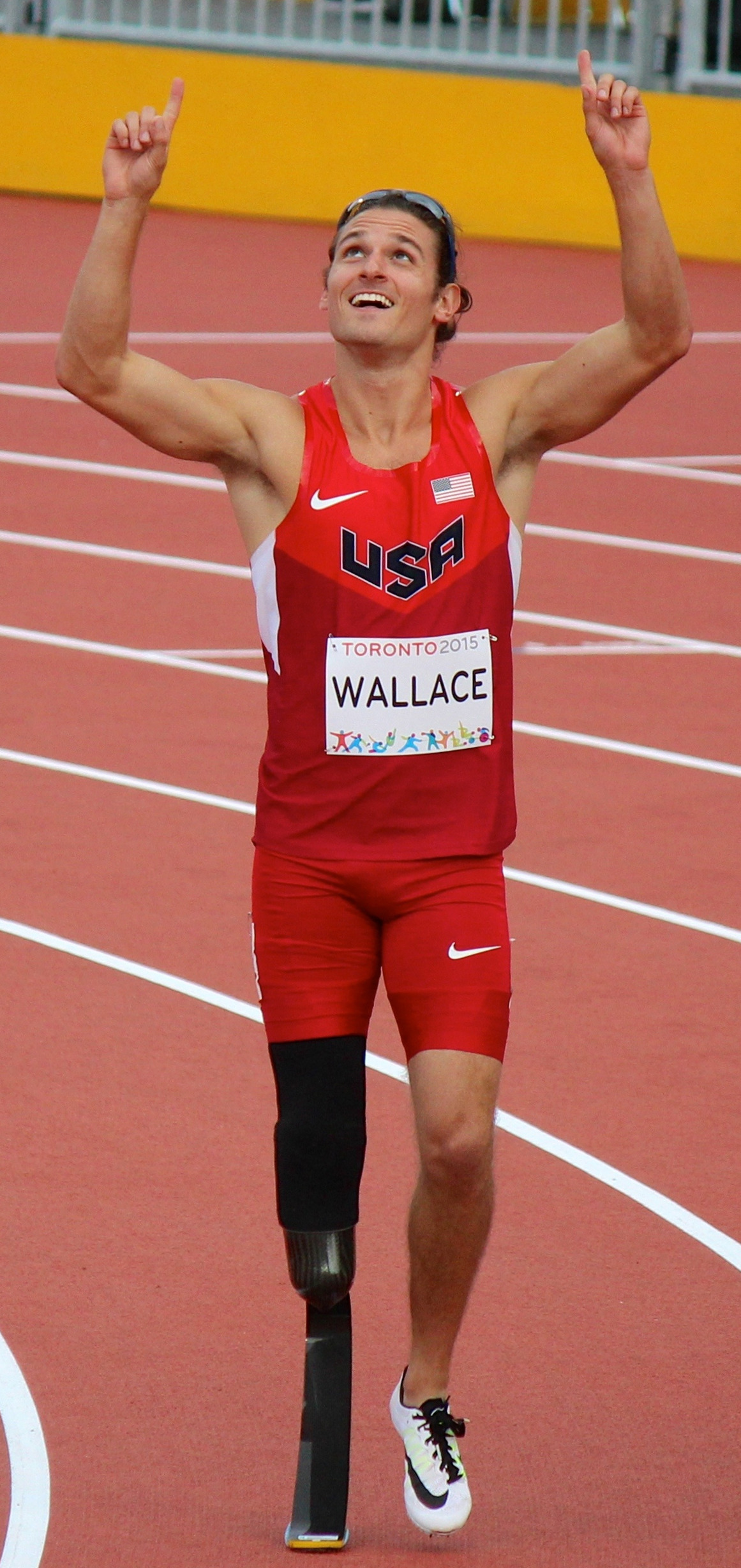
- Wallace at the 2015 Parapan American Games

Personal information
- Born: May 15, 1990 (age 36) Athens, Georgia, U.S.
- Height: 5 ft 8 in (1.73 m)
- Weight: 145 lb (66 kg)
- Spouse: Lea Wallace

Sport
- Sport: Paralympic athletics
- Disability class: T44
- Event: Sprint
- Coached by: Ken Harnden
Medal record
Representing United States
Paralympic Games
Bronze medal – third place	2020 Tokyo	200 m T64
Bronze medal – third place	2024 Paris	Long jump T64
World Championships
Gold medal – first place	2013 Lyon	400 m T44
Gold medal – first place	2013 Lyon	4 × 100 m T42–46
Gold medal – first place	2017 London	200 m T44
Bronze medal – third place	2017 London	100 m T44
Bronze medal – third place	2025 New Delhi	Long jump T64
Parapan American Games
Gold medal – first place	2011 Guadalajara	100 m T44
Gold medal – first place	2015 Toronto	100 m T44

Jarryd Wallace (born May 15, 1990) is an American T44 Paralympic sprint runner who won the 100 m event at the 2011 and 2015 Parapan American Games. He is a student in sport management at the University of Georgia.

== Career ==
Wallace was born to Jeff and Sabina Wallace and has an elder sister Brittany. He began running as an able-bodied athlete, but lost his right leg after developing compartment syndrome. He won gold medals in the 100 m at the 2011 and 2015 Parapan American Games and qualified for the 2012 and 2016 Paralympics. His 4 × 100 m T42–46 relay teams were disqualified on both occasions, while individually he placed sixth over 400 m in 2012 and fifth over 100 m in 2016.
