= Chad Perris =

Australian Paralympic athlete

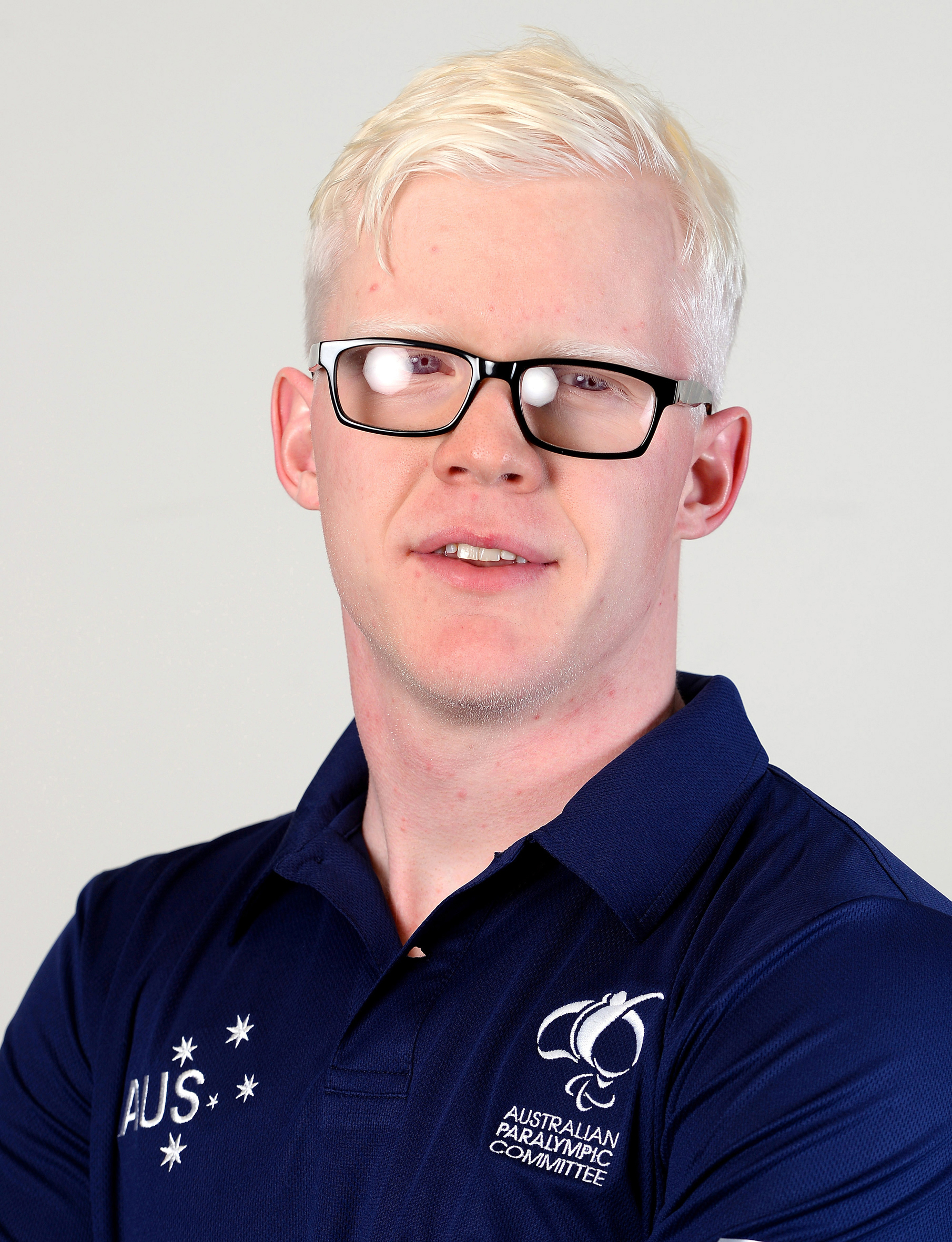
- 2016 Australian Paralympic team portrait

Personal information
- Nickname: The White Tiger
- Nationality: Australia
- Born: 15 June 1992 (age 34) Perth, Western Australia

Sport
- Disability: Visual impairment
- Disability class: T13
- Event(s): 100m, 200m
- Coached by: Matthew Beckenham
Medal record
Men's para athletics
Representing Australia
Paralympic Games
| Bronze medal – third place | 2016 Rio | 100 m T13 |
World Championships
| Silver medal – second place | 2015 Doha | 200 m T13 |
| Silver medal – second place | 2019 Dubai | 100 m T13 |
| Silver medal – second place | 2025 New Delhi | 100 m T13 |
| Bronze medal – third place | 2015 Doha | 100 m T13 |
| Bronze medal – third place | 2017 London | 100 m T13 |

Chad Perris (born 15 June 1992) is a vision impaired Australian athlete, born with albinism. He specialises in the 100m and 200m events. He has won three silver and two bronze medals at the World Para Athletics Championships and a bronze medal at the 2016 Rio Paralympics. He also competed at the 2020 Tokyo Paralympics and the 2024 Paris Paralympics. .

== Personal ==
Perris was born on 15 June 1992 in Perth, Western Australia with albinism meaning he has white hair and no colour in his skin. He is known as "The White Tiger", a nickname gained while playing football in his home town of Perth. Perris attended Duncraig Senior High School. His younger brother Kane was selected for vision impaired track cycling events at the 2024 Paris Paralympics.

== Career ==
Commencing the sport of athletics in 2012, Perris reached the international stage in 2013. Perris' classification is T13.

In his first Australian Campaign at the IPC Athletics World Championships in 2013, Perris ran a personal best in the 100m of 11.17 seconds that saw him place fifth. He was only 0.05 seconds away from the bronze medal and 0.02 seconds away from the silver medal. Perris also ran the 200m, breaking an Australian record which was set back in 1985 in a time of 22.97 seconds. This time also saw him break the Oceania area record. After the World Championships, Perris moved to Canberra to be coached by Iryna Dvoskina.

Perris finished with a bronze medal in the ambulant 100m at the Australian Championships in 2014, and achieved the number one ranking for 2014 International Paralympic Committee (IPC) athletics men's T13 100m with a time of 11.06 seconds. He was nominated for the Athletics Australia 2014 Para-athlete of the Year award.

At the 2015 IPC Athletics World Championships in Doha, he won the silver medal in the Men's 200m T13 in a personal best time and the national record by almost half a second to cross in a time of 21.82 (w: +1.5). He also won the bronze in the Men's 100m T13 with a time of 10.96 (w: +2.3).

Perris competed in the Rio 2016 Summer Paralympics where he won a bronze medal in the Men's 100m T13 in a time of 10.83.

At the 2017 World Para Athletics Championships in London, England, Perris won the bronze medal in the Men's 100 m T13 and finished fourth in the Men's 200 m T13.

Peris won the silver medal in the Men's 100 m T13 at the 2019 World Para Athletics Championships in Dubai. He ran 0.10s outside his season best for silver (10.86s) in the final.

At the 2020 Tokyo Summer Paralympics, Perris finished second in his Men's 100m T13 heat and qualified for the final. He failed to win a medal coming 5th in the final. Peris finished 4th at the 2023 World Para Athletics Championships in Men's 100m T13 with a time of 10.87 (-0.7), behind Jakkarim Dammunee (10.86).

At the 2024 Paris Paralympics, he finished fourth in the Men's 100m T13 with a time of 10.80. He missed the bronze medal by 0.005 seconds. At the 2025 World Para Athletics Championships in New Delhi, he won the silver medal in Men's 100m T13 in 10.96 (-1.3).

He is coached by Matthew Beckenham after being coached by Iryna Dvoskina.

== Recognition ==
- 2025 - Western Australian Institute of Sport Para Athlete of the Year
