= Athletics at the 2016 Summer Paralympics – Men's 100 metres T38 =

Men's 100 metres T38 at the XV Paralympic Games
- Venue: Estádio Olímpico João Havelange
- Dates: 12–13 September 2016
- Competitors: 12 from 8 nations

Medalists
1st place, gold medalist(s)		Jianwen Hu	China
2nd place, silver medalist(s)		Evan O'Hanlon	Australia
3rd place, bronze medalist(s)		Edson Pinheiro	Brazil

The T38 category is for ambulant athletes with cerebral palsy. T38 athletes have the mildest form of impairment caused by cerebral palsy, often in only one limb, and not affecting the ability to run, walk or jump freely, although impairing performance. T38 athletes may suffer minor co-ordination difficulties.

The Athletics at the 2016 Summer Paralympics – Men's 100 metres T38 event at the 2016 Paralympic Games took place on 12–13 September 2016, at the Estádio Olímpico João Havelange.

== Heats ==
=== Heat 1 ===
12:22 12 September 2016:

Rank	Lane	Bib	Name	Nationality	Reaction	Time	Notes
1	3	1245	Jianwen Hu	China		10.93	Q
2	4	1157	Edson Pinheiro	Brazil		11.32	Q
3	5	1274	Wenjun Zhou	China		11.34	Q
4	7	2273	Mohamed Farhat Chida	Tunisia		11.73	q
5	6	1306	Luis Fernando Lucumí Villegas	Colombia		11.78	
	8	1890	Oumar Sidibe	Mali			DSQ

=== Heat 2 ===
12:30 12 September 2016:

Rank	Lane	Bib	Name	Nationality	Reaction	Time	Notes
1	7	1059	Evan O'Hanlon	Australia		11.25	Q
2	5	2078	Dyan Buis	South Africa		11.29	Q
3	8	1304	Weiner Diaz	Colombia		11.48	Q
4	4	1272	Huanghao Zhong	China		11.65	q
5	6	1545	Dennis Rill	Germany		12.03	
6	3	1305	Dixon Hooker	Colombia		13.26	

== Final ==
10:43 13 September 2016:

Rank	Lane	Bib	Name	Nationality	Reaction	Time	Notes
1st place, gold medalist(s)	5	1245	Jianwen Hu	China		10.74	
2nd place, silver medalist(s)	7	1059	Evan O'Hanlon	Australia		10.98	
3rd place, bronze medalist(s)	6	1157	Edson Pinheiro	Brazil		11.26	
4	4	2078	Dyan Buis	South Africa		11.26	
5	9	1274	Wenjun Zhou	China		11.34	
6	3	1272	Huanghao Zhong	China		11.66	
7	2	2273	Mohamed Farhat Chida	Tunisia		11.82	
	8	1304	Weiner Díaz	Colombia			DSQ
