= Iryna Dvoskina =

Ukraine-born Australian athletics coach

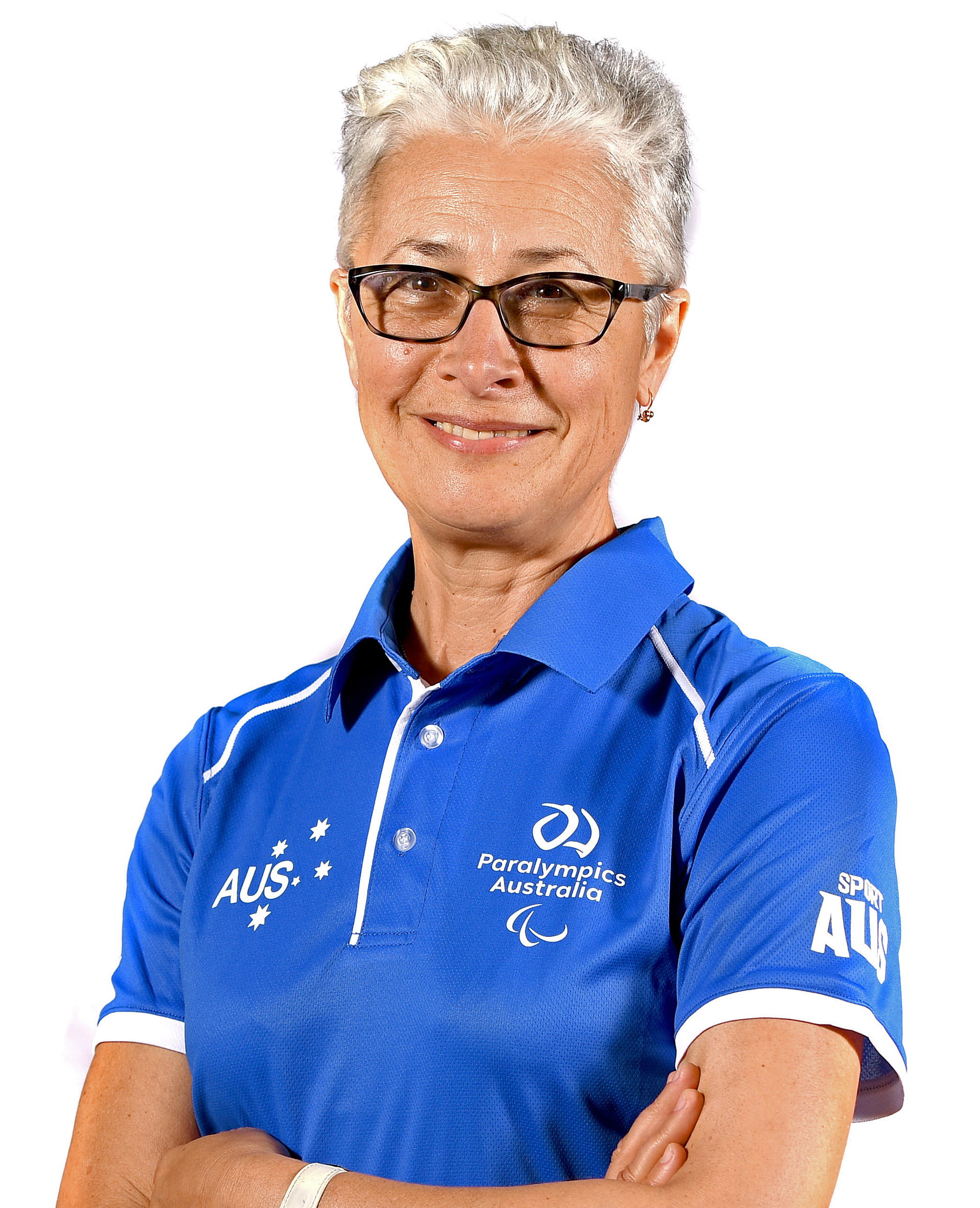
- Iryna Dvoskina in 2019

Personal information
- Nationality: Australia
- Born: December 22, 1958 (age 67)

Sport
- Sport: Paralympic athletics
- Now coaching: AThletics Australia at Australian Institute of Sport

Iryna Dvoskina (born 22 December 1958) is a Ukraine-born Australian athletics coach who works with Paralympic athletes.

== Biography ==
Being an only child, she came to Australia in 2003 to be closer to her mother Fira (born 20 September 1934), who had moved to Australia in 1996. Her mother has carried on her successful coaching career in New South Wales.

She undertook a four-year coaching degree at university in Ukraine. She was the athletics coach with the Ukrainian Paralympic team from 1995 to 2002. In 2003, she was appointed sprints and jumps coach for Australian Institute of Sport Paralympic track and field athletes. She has been an athletics coach with the Australian team from 2004 Athens Paralympics to the 2020 Tokyo Paralympics.

== Coaching Medals at Major Championships ==
| Athlete | Disability Class | Paralympic Games Medals | World Championships Medals | Commonwealth Games Medals |
|---|---|---|---|---|
| Heath Francis | Arm amputee T46 | 2004 - 3 Silver, 2 Bronze; 2008 - 3 Gold, 1 Bronze | 2006 - 3 Gold | 2006 - 1 Gold |
| Lisa McIntosh | Cerebral palsy T37 | 2004 - 1 Silver, 1 Bronze | - | - |
| Amy Winters | Arm amputee T46 | 2004 - 2 Gold | - | - |
| Katrina Webb | Cerebral palsy T38 | - | - | 2006- 1 Gold |
| Aaron Chatman | Arm amputee T46 | 2008 - 1 Silver, 1 Bronze | 2006- 1 Silver | - |
| Christine Wolf | Leg amputee T42 | 2008 - 1 Gold | - | - |
| Evan O'Hanlon | Cerebral palsy T38 | 2008 - 3 Gold; 2012 - 2 Gold; 2016 - 1 Silver; 2020 - 1 Bronze | 2006 - 2 Gold, 1 Bronze; 2011 - 2 Gold, 1 Silver, 1 Bronze; 2013 - 3 Gold; 2017 - 1 Gold | 2018 - 1 Gold |
| Brad Scott | Cerebral palsy T37 | 2008 - 1 Silver; 2012 - 1 Silver, 1 Bronze | 2011 - 1 Silver, 1 Bronze; 2013 - 1 Silver | - |
| Scott Reardon | Leg amputee T42/T63 | 2012 - 1 Silver; 2016 - 1 Gold | 2013 - 1 Gold, 1 Silver; 2015 - 1 Gold; 2017 - 1 Gold | - |
| Chad Perris | Vision impaired T13 | 2016 - 1 Bronze | 2015 - 1 Silver, 1 Bronze; 2017 - 1 Bronze; 2019 - 1 Silver | |
| Vanessa Low | Double leg amputee T61 | 2020 - 1 Gold | 2019 - 1 Gold | - |
| James Turner | Cerebral palsy T36 | 2020 - 1 Gold, 1 Silver; 2024 - 2 Gold | 2019 - 2 Gold | - |

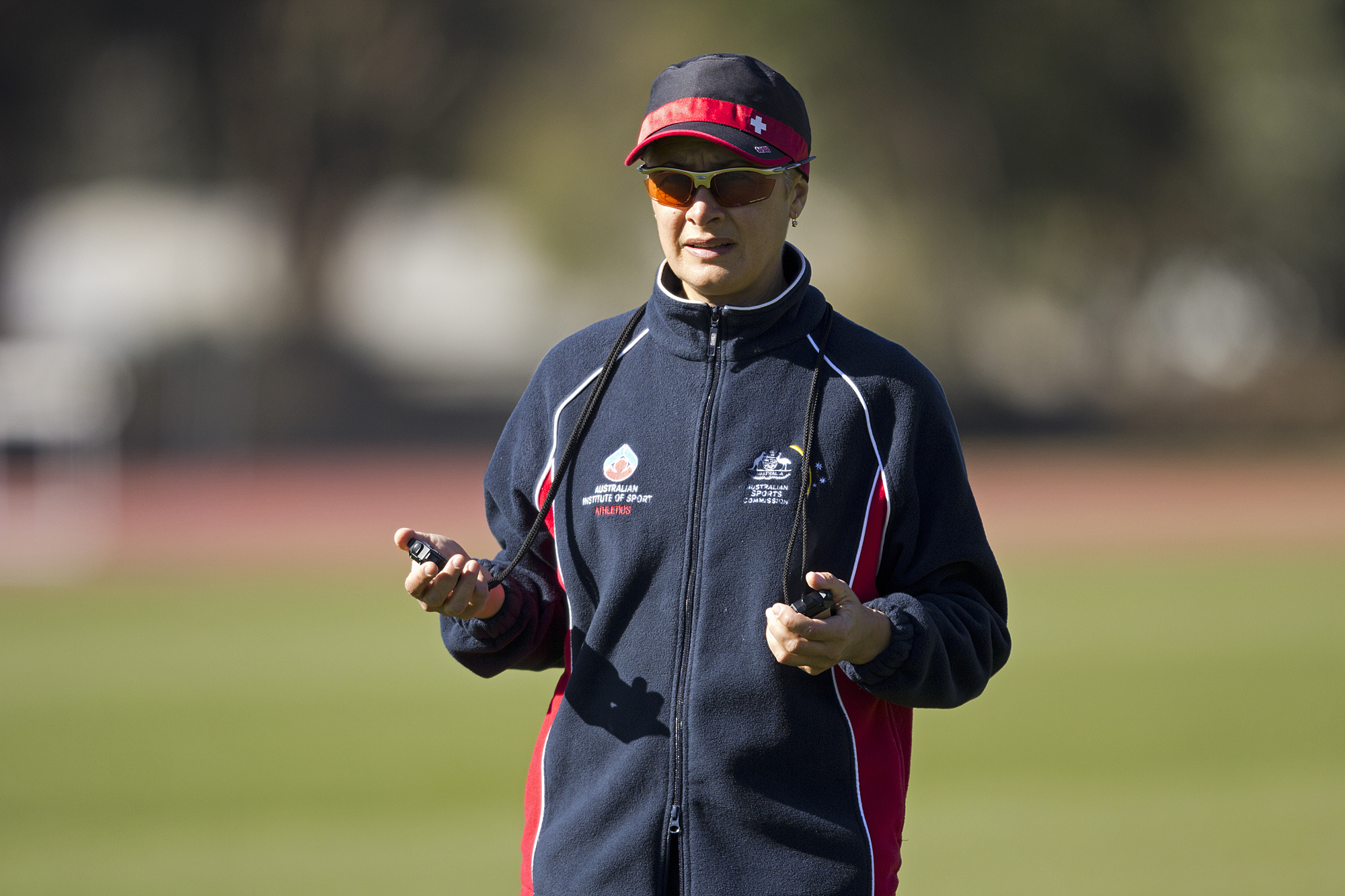
Dvoskina coaching at the AIS Track and Field

She is regarded as a strict coach due to her intensive training six days a week, careful diets and her attention to detail. She has stated:"[My mother] is the biggest inspiration in my life ... maybe there is some genetics. I love my job and I am doing it with love. I love my guys." Her husband Yuriy Vdovychenko was Paralympic Swimming Coach at the National Training Centre (NTC) in Canberra from 2013 to 2020.

== Recognition ==
- 2008 - Australian Paralympic Committee Coach of the Year.
- 2016 - Australian Paralympic Committee Coach of the Year.
- 2022 - Medal (OAM) of the Order of Australia for service to Paralympic athletics
