= Athletics at the 2015 Parapan American Games – Men's 100 metres T38 =

Athletics – Men's 100 metres T38 at the 2015 Parapan American Games
- Venue: CIBC Athletics Stadium
- Dates: August 11
- Competitors: 8 from 5 nations

Medalists
1st place, gold medalist(s)		Edson Pinheiro	Brazil
2nd place, silver medalist(s)		Kyle Whitehouse	Canada
3rd place, bronze medalist(s)		Weiner Javier Diaz Mosquera	Colombia

The men's T38 100 metres competition of the athletics events at the 2015 Parapan American Games was held on August 11 at the CIBC Athletics Stadium. The defending Parapan American Games champion was Edson Pinheiro of Brazil.

== Records ==
Prior to this competition, the existing records were as follows:

World record	Evan O'Hanlon (AUS)	10.79	London, Great Britain	1 September 2012
Americas Record	Edson Pinheiro (BRA)	11.28	Tunis, Tunisia	14 June 2008
Parapan Am Record	Edson Pinheiro (BRA)	11.47	Guadalajara, Mexico	14 November 2011

== Schedule ==
All times are Central Standard Time (UTC-6).

Date	Time	Round
11 August	16:12	Final

== Results ==
All times are shown in seconds.

KEY:	q	Fastest non-qualifiers	Q	Qualified	PR	Parapan American Games record	AR	Area record	NR	National record	PB	Personal best	SB	Seasonal best	DSQ	Disqualified	FS	False start

=== Final ===
Wind +2.8 m/s

Rank	Name	Nation	Time	Notes
1st place, gold medalist(s)	Edson Pinheiro	Brazil	11.25	
2nd place, silver medalist(s)	Kyle Whitehouse	Canada	11.41	
3rd place, bronze medalist(s)	Weiner Javier Diaz Mosquera	Colombia	11.66	
4	Dixon de Jesus Hooker Velasquez	Colombia	11.66	
5	Pedro Neves da Silva	Brazil	12.15	
6	Jesus Cortes Roman	Mexico	12.63	
7	Luis Alejandro Prado Guerrero	Nicaragua	13.08	
8	Dalmiro Geliz	Colombia	13.70	
