= Dan Bramall (athlete) =

British athlete (born 1985)

Personal information
- Nationality: British
- Born: 29 January 1985 (age 41)

Sport
- Country: Great Britain
- Sport: Track and field
- Disability class: T33 athletics
- Event(s): 100m, 200m, 400m, 800m
- Club: Liverpool
- Coached by: Pete Wyman

Achievements and titles
- Paralympic finals: 2016
Medal record
Athletics
IPC World Championships
Silver medal – second place	2015 Doha	100m – T33
IPC European Championships
Silver medal – second place	2016 Grosseto	100m - T33

Daniel Bramall (born 29 January 1985) is a British athlete who competes in T33 racing events. In 2015 Bramall finished in silver medal position in the T33 100m sprint event at the IPC World Championships in Doha.

== Personal history ==
Bramall was born in 1985 and grew up in Minshull Vernon in the north west of England. Bramall has cerebral palsy which affects his lower limbs.

== Career history ==
Bramall was introduced to athletics and wheelchair racing by a friend and subsequently joined Stockport Harriers and Athletics Club. In 2012 he was classified as a T33 athlete and took part in his first meets that year. Bramall focused primarily on the sprint events and in his first season recorded a best of 23.59 in the T33 100m. The next season Bramall began posting championship times in his three main events. He brought his personal best in the 100m down to 18.88, his 200m time from 44.34 to 35.17 and reduced his 400m to 68.89 an improvement of over 20 seconds.

In 2014 Bramall entered his first IPC Grand Prix, travelling to Nottwil in Switzerland. There he finished third in the 100m, with a personal best of 18.69 and another third spot finish in the 200m. The following year Bramall joined the Great Britain team to compete at the 2015 IPC Athletics World Championships in Doha. At the World Championships Bramall only contested the 100m as there was no 200m competition. Bramall finished second behind Kuwait's Ahmad Almutairi to win his first major international medal. The next year, in the build up to the Summer Paralympics in Rio, Bramall travelled to Grosseto to compete in the 2016 IPC Athletics European Championships. There was only one T33 event at the championship, the 100m sprint, and in a limited field Bramall took the silver medal behind British team-mate Toby Gold.

In July 2016 Bramall was confirmed as a member of the Great Britain team to compete at the Rio Paralympics.
