= Scott Reardon =

Australian Paralympic athlete (born 1990)

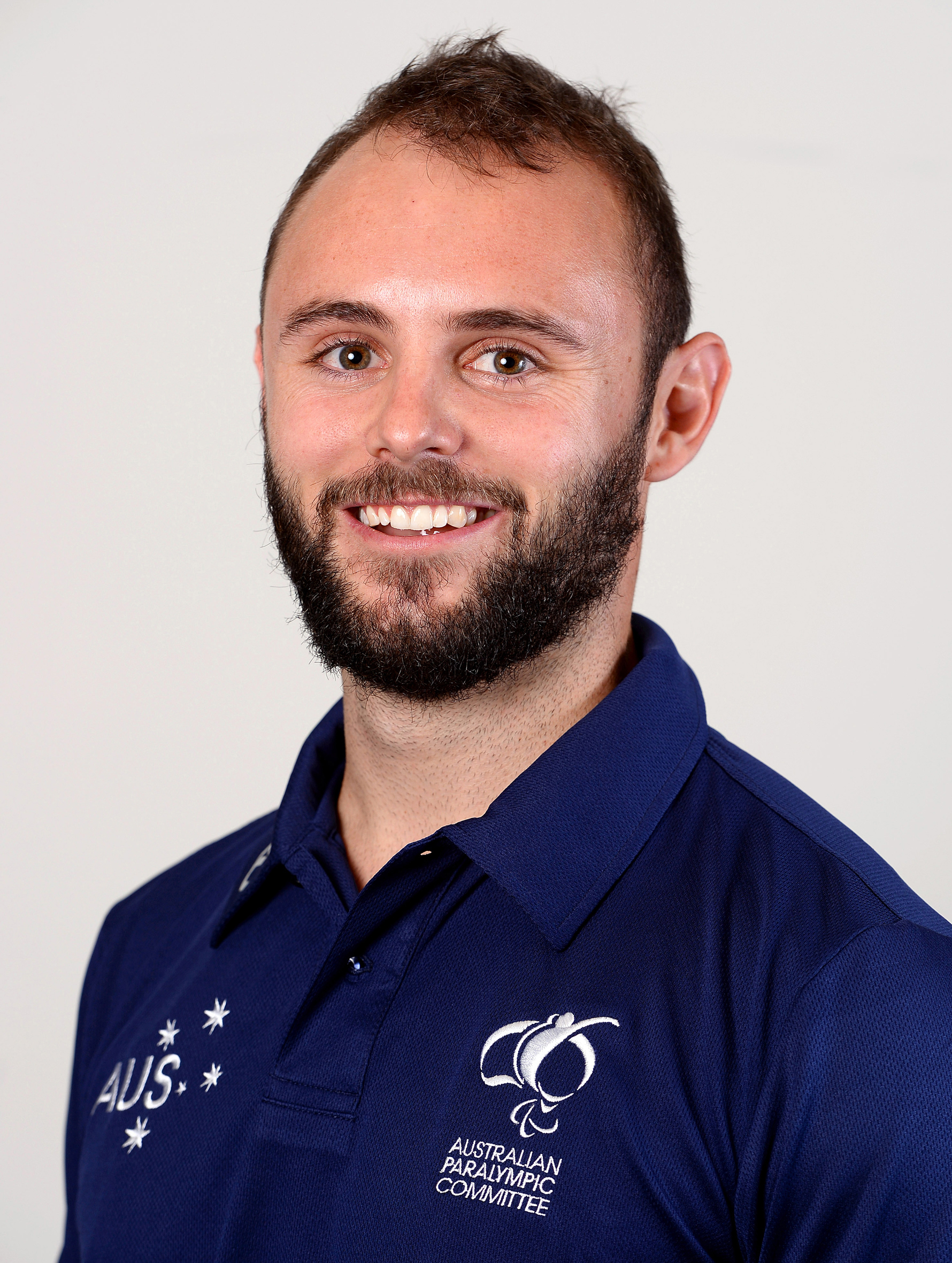
- 2016 Australian Paralympic team portrait of Reardon

Personal information
- Nationality: Australian
- Born: 15 May 1990 (age 36) Temora, New South Wales

Sport
- Country: Australia
- Sport: Athletics
Medal record
Track and field
Paralympic Games
Gold medal – first place	2016 Rio de Janeiro	Men's 100 m T42
Silver medal – second place	2012 London	Men's 100 m T42
IPC Athletics World Championships
Gold medal – first place	2013 Lyon	Men's 100 m T42
Gold medal – first place	2015 Doha	Men's 100 m T42
Gold medal – first place	2017 London	Men's 100 m T42
Silver medal – second place	2013 Lyon	Men's 200 m T42

Scott Peter Reardon, OAM (born 15 May 1990) is an Australian Paralympic leg amputee sprinter and water skier. He won water skiing world championships in 2007 and 2009. He represented Australia at the 2012 Summer Paralympics in athletics, winning a silver medal in the Men's 100 m T42. At the 2016 Rio Paralympics, he went one placing better to win the gold medal. Reardon has won the Men's 100 m T42 in three consecutive World Para Athletics Championships, from 2013 to 2017. He competed at the 2020 Tokyo Paralympics, his third games.

== Personal ==
Reardon was born on 15 May 1990 in Temora, New South Wales. Reardon grew up on his family's property near Temora, New South Wales.

In 2002, Reardon got his shoelace caught in the power take off shaft of a tractor and severed his right leg through the knee. He spent a month in hospital recovering and amazed doctors by relearning to walk in just one week. He continued to water-ski on one leg, representing Australia three times at the Water-Skiing World Championships and winning the world title twice in 2007 and 2009.

Growing up in the country NSW town of Temora, sport has long played a prominent role in Reardon's life. The nephew of former Canterbury Bulldogs NRL player Steve Reardon, Scott Reardon was the 2005 Temora and District Sportsperson of the Year. In 2006, he attended a Paralympic Talent Search day and was immediately identified as having the potential to run on the track at the London 2012 Paralympic Games.

Watching the Australian Team compete at the Beijing Paralympic Games further inspired Reardon to pursue his talent for running. After juggling water skiing and athletics for a while, he moved to Canberra in 2009 to train at the Australian Institute of Sport (AIS) and focus on his athletics career. At the AIS, he trained alongside his sporting heroes, former track star and gold medallist Heath Francis and gold medallist and world record holder Evan O'Hanlon.

With less than a year of training he finished third in the 200m and fourth in the 100m at the 210 National Athletics Championships in Perth. At the 2011 World Championships in Christchurch, Reardon finished fourth in the 100m sprint and fifth in the 200m, signalling his medal credentials for London 2012.

Reardon earned the Commonwealth Sport Achievement Awards in 2007. In 2009, he relocated to Canberra. In 2012, he was a student at the University of Canberra where he was working on a Bachelor of Secondary Education in Design and Technology. His partner is Paralympic athlete Vanessa Low.

In 2018, Reardon part of the National Farmers' Federation Safe Hands campaign.

== Water ski ==
His parents have provided monetary support to help him waterski. Reardon has competed in his state's able bodied water skiing competition, and was the first person with a disability to win it. He competed at the 2007 Disabled World Championships in Townsville, where he earned a gold medal For the jump event. In 2009, he competed at the Australian Tournament Waterski disabled titles, where he earned a trio of gold medals. At the 2009 World Water Ski Championships, he won jump and overall.

== Athletics ==
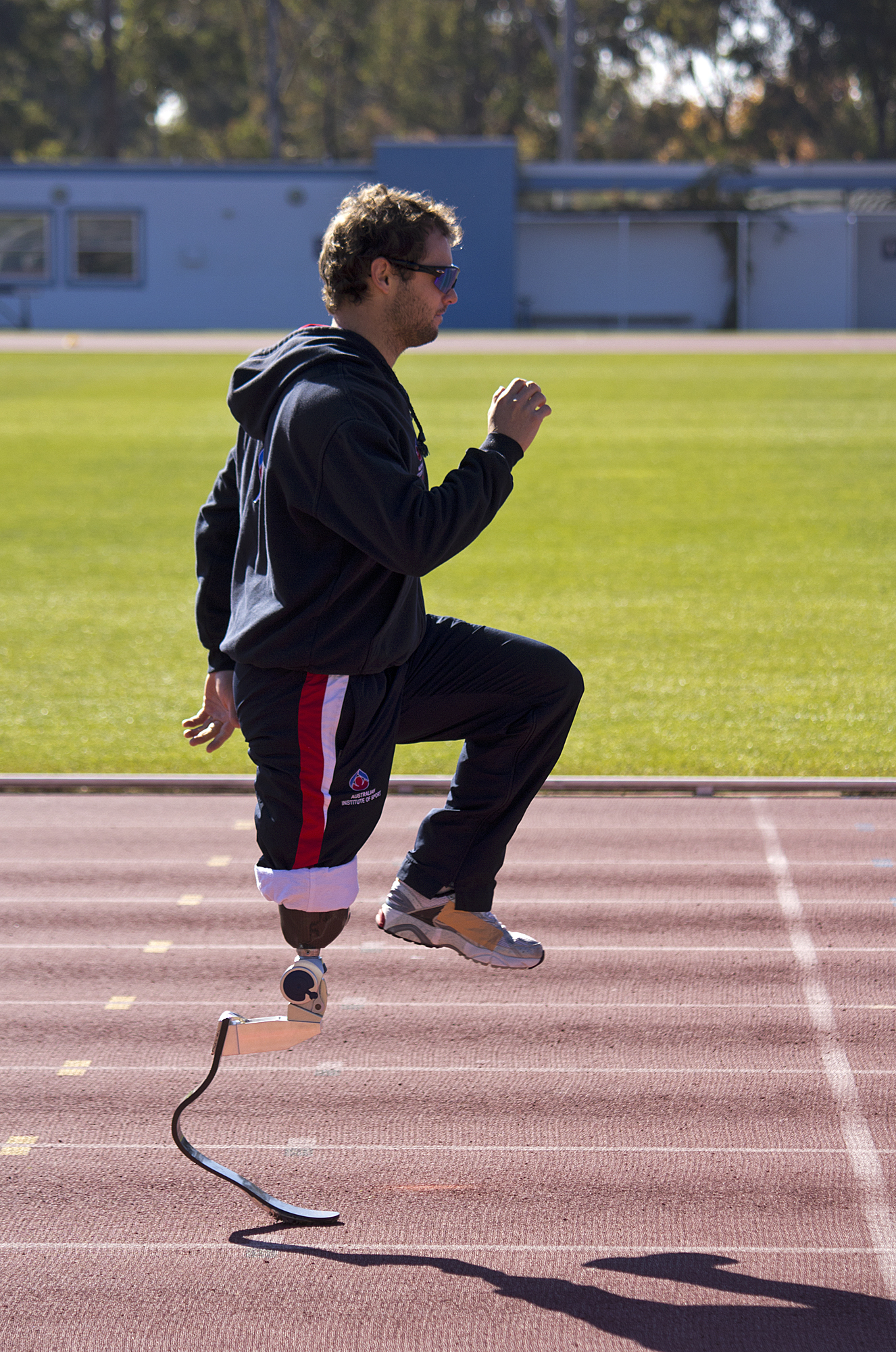
Reardon running at the AIS

Reardon is a T42 classified athlete. He is based at the Australian Institute of Sport where he is coached by Iryna Dvoskina. He was active in sport before his accident and was concerned following his accident that he would not be able to run again. He was representing Australia in 2007 in the 100-metre event. He competed at the 2011 IPC Athletics World Championships making three finals but not winning a medal. At the 2012 London Paralympics, he won a silver medal in the Men's 100 m T42 and placed fourth in the Men's 200 m T42.

Reardon turns around on the track at AIS.

At the 2013 IPC Athletics World Championships in Lyon, France, he won a gold medal in the Men's 100 m and a silver medal in the Men's 200m T42 events. He dead heated with Heinrich Popow from Germany in the Men's 100 m final. The rivalry between Reardon and Popow was highlighted by Reardon stating: "0.03 seconds separated Heinrich and I coming into this championship in terms of personal best, and today we can't even be split. The last three races we have been in we have been separated by a total of 0.05 seconds highlighting how good this rivalry is."

At the 2015 IPC Athletics World Championships in Doha, Reardon won the Men's 100 m T42 in 12.13 (w: +0.3). After winning the 100 m, Reardon said: "You come to championships to win championships and that’s the most important thing. I probably didn’t get the time I wanted, but when people look back, how I got there won’t matter. It will just show me as world champion, and that’s so exciting." He finished fourth in the Men's 200 m T42 in a time of 25.43 (w: 0.0). .

Reardon won the gold medal in the Men's 100 m T42 at the 2016 Rio Paralympics in a Paralympic record time of 12.26. He was awarded the Order of Australia Medal in 2017.

At the 2017 World Para Athletics Championships in London, Reardon won his third consecutive Men's 100 m T42 title with a time of 12.21.

At the 2020 Tokyo Paralympics, Reardon came fourth in his100m T63 heat and qualified for the final. He failed to win a medal coming fifth in the final.

Reardon announced his retirement from competitive athletics in October 2021. He said "My retirement has been a long time coming. I've been preparing for retirement since 2017 as I knew the end of my career was coming closer, but it was important to me to finish my career at a Paralympic Games because it is the pinnacle of what we do. To do that with (wife and fellow Paralympic gold medallist) Vanessa (Low) was the number one priority for me, as we had always dreamed of being on an Australian team together."
