= Jason Smyth =

Irish sprint runner

Jason Smyth MBE
Personal information
- Nationality: Irish
- Born: 4 July 1987 (age 39) Derry, Northern Ireland
- Height: 177 cm (5 ft 10 in)
- Website: JasonSmyth.ie

Sport
- Sport: Running
- Disability class: T13
- Events: 100 metres, 200 metres, 60 metres
Medal record
Men's para-athletics
Representing Ireland
Paralympic Games
Gold medal – first place	2008 Beijing	100 m T13
Gold medal – first place	2008 Beijing	200 m T13
Gold medal – first place	2012 London	100 m T13
Gold medal – first place	2012 London	200 m T13
Gold medal – first place	2016 Rio de Janeiro	100 m T13
Gold medal – first place	2020 Tokyo	100 m T13
World Championships
Gold medal – first place	2006 Assen	100 m T13
Gold medal – first place	2006 Assen	200 m T13
Gold medal – first place	2013 Lyon	100 m T13
Gold medal – first place	2013 Lyon	200 m T13
Gold medal – first place	2015 Doha	100 m T13
Gold medal – first place	2017 London	100 m T13
Gold medal – first place	2017 London	200 m T13
Gold medal – first place	2019 Dubai	100 m T13
European Championships
Gold medal – first place	2005 Espoo	100m – T13
Gold medal – first place	2005 Espoo	200m – T13
Gold medal – first place	2014 Swansea	100m – T12
Gold medal – first place	2014 Swansea	200m – T12
Gold medal – first place	2018 Berlin	100m – T13
Gold medal – first place	2018 Berlin	200m – T13
World Indoor Championships
Gold medal – first place	2006 Bollnas	60m – T13

Jason Smyth (born 4 July 1987) is an Irish retired sprint runner. He competes in the T13 disability sport classification as he is legally blind, with his central vision being affected by Stargardt's disease; he also competes in elite non-Paralympic competition. As of July 2014, Smyth holds T13 World records in the 100m and 200m events.

He was selected to represent Northern Ireland at the 2014 Commonwealth Games. Deterioration in his vision meant that he was reassigned to the T12 classification in 2014, but he was subsequently reclassified back to T13 in 2015.

== Career ==
He won two golds for Ireland at the 2008 Summer Paralympics setting records at the Men's 100 metres T13 and the Men's 200 metres T13, which led some Irish news sources to compare his feat to that of Usain Bolt, who achieved a similar feat at the 2008 Summer Olympics In 2015 the International Paralympic Committee's website also compared him to Bolt. Comparisons to Bolt have also been made by some non-Irish news sources such as CNN.

Smyth made history as the first Paralympian to compete at an open European championships, qualifying for the semi-finals of the 100 metres. Smyth ran 10.43 seconds, finishing 4th in his heat. He just missed out on the final by finishing 4th in semi-finals in a time of 10.47 seconds. Smyth was selected to represent Northern Ireland at the 2010 Commonwealth Games in Delhi, but had to withdraw from the team due to a back injury.

He won a bronze medal with the Irish relay team in the 4 × 100 m relay at the 2011 European Team Championships.

Smyth hoped to compete in both the Paralympics and the Olympics in 2012. Although he ran 10.22 for the 100m in May 2011, this was 0.04s short of the A time needed to secure a place in the Olympic Games.

At the 2012 Summer Paralympics, Smyth won Heat 1 of the 100m breaking the World Record in a time of 10.54 seconds before breaking the record again in the final where he defended his Paralympic title in a time of 10.46 seconds. This final was also marked as the fastest Paralympic 100 metres in history. Smyth equalled his Beijing achievement by winning gold in the Men's T13 200m with a world record time of 21.05 seconds.

At the 2016 Summer Paralympics, Smyth won Gold in the 100m final. The Irishman clocked 10.64 seconds as he finished 0.14 ahead of Namibia's Johannes Nambala.

At the 2020 Summer Paralympics, Smyth again won Gold in the 100m final. He clocked 10.53 seconds as he finished 0.01 ahead of Algeria's Skander Djamil Athmani.

In 2017 the International Paralympic Committee's website described him as "the world's fastest Paralympian". In 2015 it had described him as "the fastest para-athlete of all time", while Britain's BBC described him as "the world's fastest ever Paralympian" in 2016.

In December 2023 he was announced in the line-up for Dancing with the Stars Ireland season 7. On Saint Patrick's Day 2024, despite receiving low scores throughout the competition, Smyth and his dance partner Karen Byrne were announced as the winners of the show.

== Personal life ==
Jason is from Eglinton. He is a member of the Church of Jesus Christ of Latter-day Saints.

Smyth was appointed Member of the Order of the British Empire (MBE) in the 2022 New Year Honours for services to Paralympic athletics and the sporting community in Northern Ireland.

== See also ==
- 2012 Olympics gold post boxes in the United Kingdom
