= Toby Gold =

English wheelchair racer

Personal information
- Born: 27 September 1994 (age 31)

Sport
- Country: Great Britain
- Sport: wheelchair racing
- Event: Sprints
Medal record
Men's athletics
Representing Great Britain
2016 Paralympic Games
Silver medal – second place	2016 Paralympic Games	100 m T33
IPC World Championships
Silver medal – second place	2017 London	100 m T33
Bronze medal – third place	2015 Doha	100 m T33
IPC European Championships
Gold medal – first place	2016 Grosseto	100 m T33

Toby Gold (born 27 September 1994) is an English wheelchair racer. He is classified as a T33 athlete and competes primarily in sprint events, winning the 100m gold in the 2016 European Championships and silver at the 2016 Paralympic Games.

== Personal history ==
Gold was born in England in 1994. He was educated at Wimbledon College and St Mary's University, Twickenham, both Roman Catholic schools. He studied Sports Science at St Mary's.

== Athletics career ==
Gold first became involved in athletics after being spotted playing wheelchair basketball in 2011. He was invited to try out at Kingsmeadow Athletics Stadium in Kingston, and subsequently joined the wheelchair training squad. By 2012 he was classified as a T33 disability athlete and began competing at national meets, mainly in sprint events.

During 2013 and 2014 Gold kept competing at national competitions winning gold medals at IWAS World Junior Games. In May 2014 he travelled to Notwill in Switzerland to compete at his first overseas event, where he collected gold in both the 100m and 200m events. Gold first represented Great Britain in a major international meet at the 2015 IPC Athletics World Championships in Doha.

Due to the absence of any 200m and 400m events, Gold only contested the 100m race, where he finished third to collect the bronze medal. The following year, in the buildup to the 2016 Summer Paralympics, Gold appeared at the European Championships in Grosseto. In a limited field, Gold finished first, beating fellow British athlete Dan Bramall into second place. Gold's finishing time of 17.64 was more than a second a half faster than his result the year previous in Doha. Gold won a Silver Medal at the 2016 Paralympic Games.
