= Edson Pinheiro =

Brazilian Paralympic athlete

Personal information
- Full name: Edson Cavalcante Pinheiro
- Born: 3 June 1979 (age 47) Cruzeiro do Sul, Acre, Brazil
- Height: 1.75 m (5 ft 9 in)

Sport
- Country: Brazil
- Sport: Para-athletics
- Disability class: T38
- Events: 100 metres; 200 metres; 400 metres
Medal record
Paralympic Games
Bronze medal – third place	2016 Rio de Janeiro	100 m T38
World Championships
Silver medal – second place	2015 Doha	100 m T38
Bronze medal – third place	2011 Christchurch	100 m T38
Bronze medal – third place	2013 Lyon	100 m T38
Bronze medal – third place	2017 London	100 m T38
Parapan American Games
Gold medal – first place	2007 Rio de Janeiro	100 m T38
Gold medal – first place	2007 Rio de Janeiro	200 m T38
Gold medal – first place	2011 Guadalajara	100 m T38
Gold medal – first place	2011 Guadalajara	200 m T38
Gold medal – first place	2015 Toronto	100 m T38
Gold medal – first place	2019 Lima	100 m T38
Silver medal – second place	2011 Guadalajara	400 m T38
Bronze medal – third place	2015 Toronto	200 m T38

Edson Cavalcante Pinheiro (Note: This name uses Portuguese naming customs: the first or maternal family name is Cavalcante and the second or paternal family name is Pinheiro.) (born 3 June 1979) is a Brazilian Paralympic athlete. He represented Brazil at the 2008 Summer Paralympics, at the 2012 Summer Paralympics and at the 2016 Summer Paralympics and he won the bronze medal in the men's 100 metres T38 event in 2016.
