= Rhys Jones (para-athlete) =

Welsh Paralympic athlete

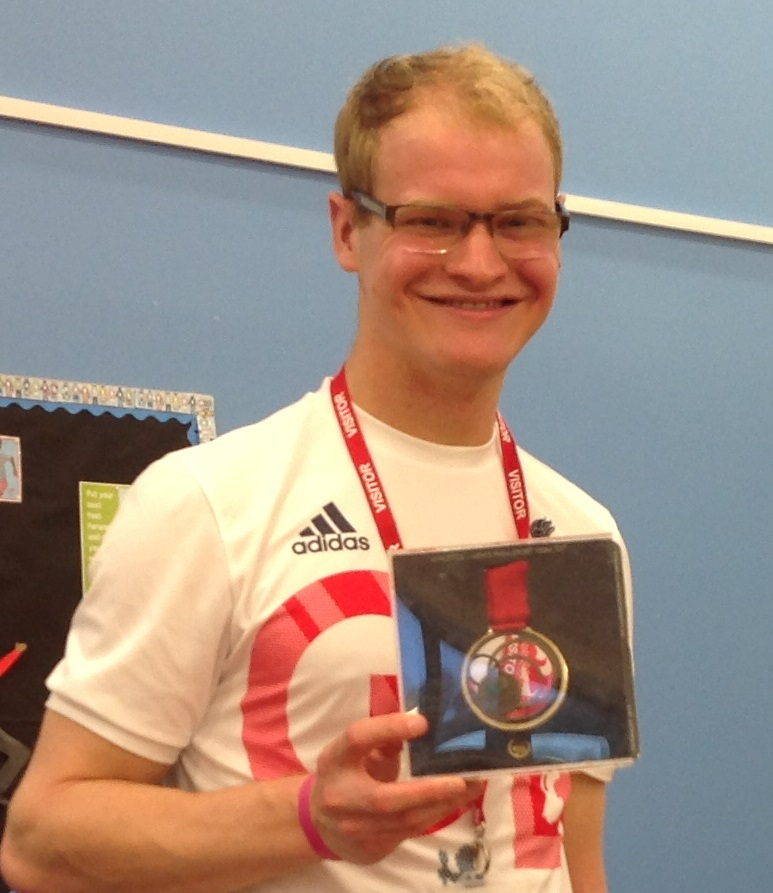
- Jones during a school visit in 2017

Personal information
- Nationality: British
- Born: 30 June 1994 (age 32) Church Village, Wales

Sport
- Country: Great Britain
- Sport: Athletics
- Event: Sprint
- Club: Disability Sport Wales Rhondda AC
- Coached by: Christian Malcolm

Achievements and titles
- Paralympic finals: 2012; 2016
- Personal best(s): 100m: 11.77s 200m: 24.37s
Medal record
Track and field (athletics)
Representing Great Britain
IPC Athletics European Championships
Bronze medal – third place	2014 Swansea	100 m T37
Representing Wales
Commonwealth Games
Bronze medal – third place	2014 Glasgow	100m - T37

Rhys Jones (born 30 June 1994) is a Paralympic athlete from Wales competing in category T37 sprinting events. Jones qualified for the 2012 Summer Paralympics in the 100m and 200m sprint. Making the final of the 200m at his first major games. From Clydach Vale, Rhondda

== History ==
Jones was born in Church Village near Pontypridd in Wales in 1994. Jones, who has cerebral palsy, played football for a pan-disability side before switching to athletics after attending a Disability Sports Wales trial. He attended his first junior competition, in Blackpool in 2008, winning four gold medals in the T37 category. By 2010 he was entering senior championships, competing in sprints and the long jump in the 2008 CP National Championships in Nottingham.

In 2011 Jones entered events across Europe taking first place at the Czech Open. He posted two personal bests in 2012, 12.25s in the 100m sprint at Birmingham and 25.24s in the 200m in the London Disability Athletics Challenge. He qualified for the 2012 Summer Paralympics in both 100m and 200m sprint. He followed his first Paralympic Games by qualifying for this 2013 IPC Athletics World Championships in Lyon finishing 7th in the 100m and 8th in the 200m.

In 2014 Jones was named in the Wales squad for the 2014 Commonwealth Games in Glasgow. He ran in the T37 100m, qualifying through the first heat in second place with a time of 12.10 and in the final he posted a time of 12.04 to take the bronze medal. The following year Jones was named in the Great Britain team for the 2015 IPC Athletics World Championships in Doha. He competed in the T47 100 metres, and qualified through the first heat in fourth place. The next day, in the final, he finished eighth in a time of 12.12.

In 2016 Jones competed at the IPC Grand Final at the Olympic Park in London. Now focusing solely on the 100 metres sprint, he finished third in a time of 11.87, a season's best. Jones' results in 2016 saw him qualify for the 2016 Summer Paralympics in Rio. Competing in the Men's 100 metres T37 he qualified as a fastest loser in the heats.
