= Mohamad Ridzuan Mohamad Puzi =

Malaysian Paralympic athlete

Mohammad Ridzuan Mohamad Puzi KMN JMW
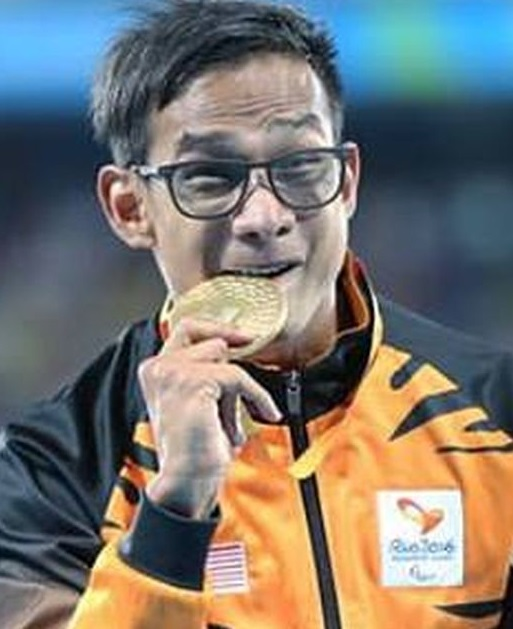

Personal information
- Nickname: Dek Wan
- Nationality: Malaysian
- Born: Mohammad Ridzuan bin Mohamad Puzi; 27 September 1987 (age 38) Padang Besar, Perlis
- Height: 1.68 m (5 ft 6 in)

Sport
- Country: Malaysia
- Sport: Track and field
- Disability class: (T36)
- Event: Sprint
- Coached by: R. Jeganathan (national); Affizam Amdan (personal)
Medal record
Paralympic athletics
Representing Malaysia
Paralympic Games
| Gold medal – first place | 2016 Rio de Janeiro | 100m - T36 |
IPC World Championships
| Gold medal – first place | 2015 Doha | 100m - T36 |
| Silver medal – second place | 2017 London | 100m - T36 |
| Bronze medal – third place | 2019 Dubai | 100m - T36 |
Asian Para Games
| Gold medal – first place | 2014 Incheon | Long Jump - T36/37/38 |
| Gold medal – first place | 2018 Jakarta | 100m - T36 |
| Gold medal – first place | 2018 Jakarta | 400m - T36 |
| Gold medal – first place | 2018 Jakarta | Long jump - T36 |
| Silver medal – second place | 2014 Incheon | 100m - T36 |
| Silver medal – second place | 2014 Incheon | 200m - T36 |
ASEAN Para Games
| Gold medal – first place | 2015 Singapore | 100m - T36 |
| Gold medal – first place | 2015 Singapore | 200m - T36 |
| Gold medal – first place | 2017 Kuala Lumpur | 200m - T36 |
| Gold medal – first place | 2022 Surakarta | 100m - T36 |
| Silver medal – second place | 2022 Surakarta | 200m - T36/37 |

Mohammad Ridzuan bin Mohamad Puzi KMN JMW (born 27 September 1987) is a Paralympic athlete from Malaysia who competes in T36 classification sprint (running) and long jump events. Mohammad Ridzuan represented Malaysia at the 2016 Summer Paralympics in Rio de Janeiro, where he won the gold medal in the 100 metres event.

== Personal life ==
Mohamad Ridzuan had been diagnosed with cerebral palsy at the age of one. In his early years, he took part in athletics during school meets. His talent was spotted by coach Affizam Amdan in 2004. Since then, coach Affizam has been guiding, grooming and training him.

== Athletics career ==
He debut as a professional para-athlete during 2011 ASEAN Para Games at Surakarta, Central Java, Indonesia. He managed to get gold medal in his debut competition. His success continues year by year with more achievements recorded.

=== 2014 Asian Para Games ===
He bagged three medals in this multi-sport events. One gold medal was from long jump event, and two others was silver for 100 metres and 200 metres.

=== 2015 IPC Athletics World Championships ===
At the event held in the evening 29 October, at the Suheim Bin Hamad Stadium, Mohamad Ridzuan make a time record of 12.08 seconds to win gold medal in his favourite event, 100 metres.

=== 2016 Rio Summer Paralympics ===
In 10 September, he won the first gold medal for Malaysia in the 2016 Paralympic Games in the 100m event.

=== 2017 World Para Athletics Championship ===
He competed in two events; 100 meters and 200 metres. Earlier in 200m events, he managed to qualified to the final event and finished fourth. Meanwhile, in the 100m events, he did not manage to retain his gold medal in the previous edition after he only managed a silver medal. He lost to Yang Yifei of China by 0.27 seconds.

=== 2018 Asian Para Games ===
He competed in three events; 100 meters, 200 metres and long jump. He achieved gold medal hat-trick in this multisport event, added by some record-breaking. He broke the 100 metres world record of Evgenii Shvetsov, and Asian record made of Yang Yifei in long jump event.

== Honours ==
=== Honours of Malaysia ===
- Malaysia
  - Officer of the Order of the Defender of the Realm (KMN) (2017)
- Federal Territory (Malaysia)
  - Companion of the Order of the Territorial Crown (JMW) (2022)
