= Brayden Davidson =

Australian Paralympic athlete

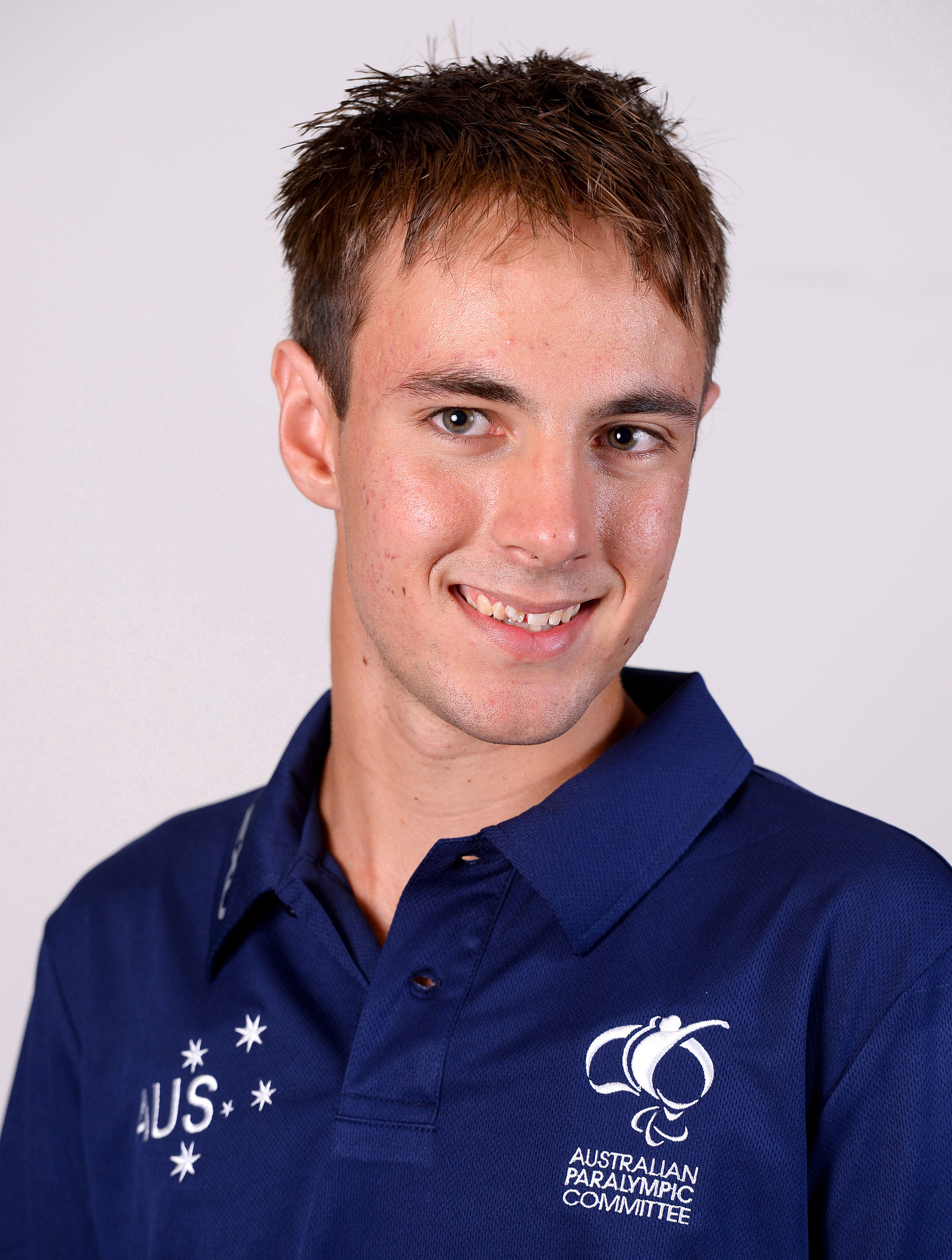
- 2016 Australian Paralympic team portrait

Personal information
- Nationality: Australia
- Born: 25 October 1997 (age 29)

Sport
- Club: Hills Districts Athletics Club: Australia
Medal record
Men's athletics
Representing Australia
Paralympic Games
Gold medal – first place	2016 Rio	Long jump – T36
IPC World Championships
Bronze medal – third place	2015 Doha	Long jump – T36
Bronze medal – third place	2017 London	Long jump – T36

Brayden Duane Davidson OAM (born 25 October 1997) is an Australian track and field para-athlete who competes mainly in the T36 classification events. He won a bronze medal at the 2015 IPC Athletics World Championships. At the 2016 Rio Paralympics, he won the gold medal in the Men's Long Jump T36.

== Personal ==
Davidson was born on 25 October 1997 and has mild cerebral palsy. He has attended Reynella East College in Adelaide.

== Sporting career ==
In September 2011, Davidson attended an Australian Paralympic Committee talent search day at Santos Stadium. He then qualified for the junior national championships in four events and went on to win a silver in the 400 and a bronze in the long jump, at the junior national championships the year after he won 4 gold medals in the 100m,200m,400m and long jump.

Davidson was awarded a Talented Athlete Award and a Paralympic Scholarship by the South Australian Sports Institute in 2013. He then went on to compete in the T36 classification in long jump at the 2013 IPC Athletics World Championships where he came fourth in the finals. Whilst still at the world championships Davidson was selected to compete in the T36 Men's 100m at the Sainsbury's Anniversary Games in London where he came fourth.

At the 2014 Australian Athletics Championships held in Melbourne, Davidson won silver in the men's 200m and long jump ambulant events.

In March 2015 Davidson competed at the Australian Junior Athletics Championships held in Sydney. He won gold in long jump, 100m and 400m and achieved a personal best and a new Australian record in the T36 class for long jump. Davidson then went on to win gold and achieved a world record in the men's ambulant long jump at the 2015 Australian Athletics Championships in Brisbane. He also won silver in the men's 200m ambulant and he reached the finals in the men's 100m ambulant event. These results have made him an A-Qualifier for the International Paralympic Committee Athletics World Championships in Doha. Davidson is now aiming to compete at the 2016 Paralympic Games.

At the 2015 IPC Athletics World Championships in Doha, he won the bronze medal in the Men's Long Jump T36. Davidson dedicated the medal to his grandmother, who encouraged him to become involved in athletics as a child.

Davidson won the gold medal in the Men's Long Jump T36 at the 2016 Rio Paralympics with a jump of 5.62 m, a personal best by 11 cm. He won the gold medal on a count back due to having the second best jump. He dedicated his win to his late grandparents who were central to his pursuit of para-sport. He was awarded the Order of Australia Medal in 2017.

At the 2017 World Para Athletics Championships in London, England, Davidson won the bronze medal in the Men's Long Jump T36 with a leap of 5.39m (+0.2). He finished eight in the Men's 100 T36 (13.29s (+0.1).

He is coached by Lynn Larsen.

== Recognition ==
- 2015 – South Australian Sports Institute Athlete with a Disability
- 2016 – South Australian Sports Institute Athlete with a Disability and Elite Athlete with a Disability of the Year at the Advertiser/Channel 7 Sport Star of the Year awards
- 2017 - Elite Athlete with a Disability of the Year at the Advertiser/Channel 7 Sport Star of the Year.
