= Ahmad Al-Mutairi =

Kuwaiti para-sport athlete

Ahmad Almutairi
Personal information
- Nationality: Kuwaiti
- Born: 13 May 1994 (age 32)

Sport
- Country: Great Britain
- Sport: Track and field Wheelchair basketball
- Disability class: T33 (athletics)
- Event(s): sprint, javelin
- Club: Kuwait Para-Sports Club
- Coached by: Mohamed Farhan

Achievements and titles
- Paralympic finals: 2012 London
Medal record
Athletics
Representing Kuwait
Summer Paralympics
Gold medal – first place	2016 Rio	100m – T33
Silver medal – second place	2020 Tokyo	100m – T33
IPC World Championships
Gold medal – first place	2015 Doha	100m – T33
Gold medal – first place	2017 London	100m – T33
Asian Para Games
Gold medal – first place	2018 Jakarta	100m – T34
Silver medal – second place	2014 Incheon	100m – T34
Silver medal – second place	2014 Incheon	200m – T34

Ahmad Almutairi (born 13 May 1994) is a Kuwaiti para-sport athlete who competes as a T33 classification track and field athlete and as a wheelchair basketball player, both at national level. Despite the fact that Almutairi held the Paralympic world record for his classification in the 100m, 200m, 400m and 800m events, major world titles eluded him because his classification was under-represented and he was forced to compete against less severely disabled athletes in the T44 class. He eventually won a gold medal at the 2016 Summer Paralympics.

== Personal history ==
Almutairi was born in Kuwait in 1994. At birth he was diagnosed with cerebral palsy, which has resulted in Almutairi having very limited movement below the waist. Due to his cerebral palsy, Almutairi was educated at a school for special needs children.

== Athletics career ==
Amutairi was introduced to sport while at school, playing wheelchair basketball. One of his PE teachers saw potential in Amutairi and suggested that he join the Kuwaiti Sports Club for the Disabled. Initially he joined the basketball team, but after five months one of the trainers advised him to diversify into other sports to reach his full potential. Amutairi tried out wheelchair racing and found that he excelled at the sport. He became classified as a T33 classification athlete and in 2009 he entered his first track and field competition, held in the United Arab Emirates. Amutairi's results at the meet saw him qualify for the 2011 IPC Athletics World Championships in Christchurch. At the World Championship Amutairi entered four events, the 100m, 200m, 400m and the javelin throw. All three sprint events were for T34 athletes, with no T33 competitions available. Despite setting a championship record in all three races, Almutairi failed to finish on the podium, being beaten in each event by the less disadvantaged T34 competitors. This situation repeated itself throughout Almutairi's early career, and it was not until 2015 that he was able to compete on a level playing field at a major international event.

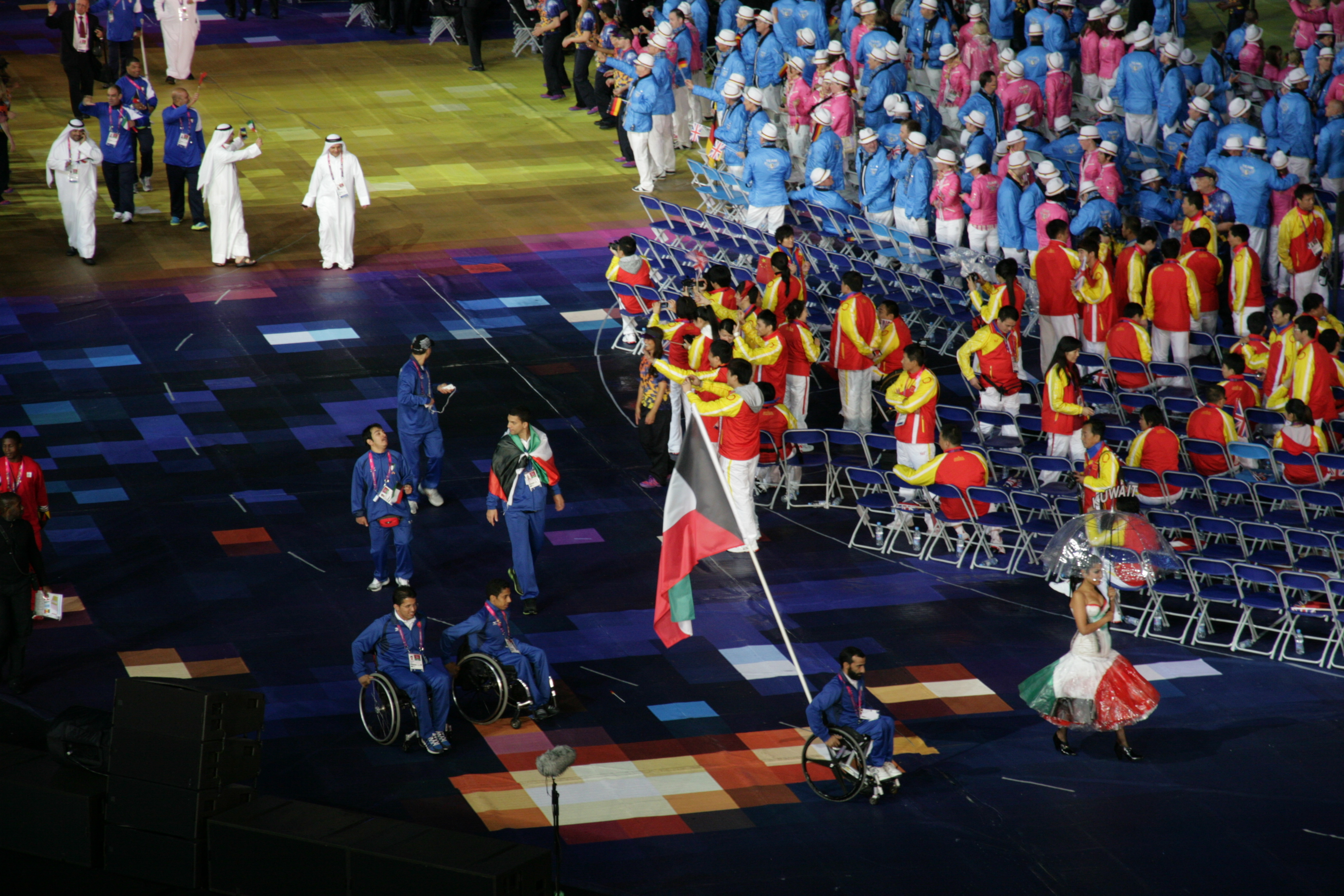
Almutairi, first wheelchair behind the flag bearer, at the opening ceremony of the 2012 Paralympics.

In 2012 Almutairi was selected for the Kuwait team at the Summer Paralympics in London. In the 100m (T34) he set a new T33 world record of 17.67, but this was not good enough to see him through the heats. This same situation occurred in the 200m, where he set another world record (31.02), but failed to finish fast enough to reach the finals. He also competed in the T33/34 javelin, but his only legal throw of 17.34 saw him drop out in the first round.

The next year Almutairi travelled to Lyon to compete in the 2013 IPC Athletics World Championships. He was again forced to compete in the T34 events and failed to get out of the heats in the 100m, 200m and 400m races. His first major medal success came the following year at the 2014 Asian Para Games in Incheon where, with a weaker field than in the Paralympics or the World Championships, he was able to win two silver medals in the 100m and 200m T34 races. Throughout 2015 Almutairi continued to improve his times, and set a new world record for the 200m at an IPC Grand Prix in Nottwil, Switzerland. Later that year he represented Kuwait at his third World Championship, this time in Doha, Qatar. This time enough T33 athletes were available for Almutairi to race in his actual classification in a single race, the 100m. In the final he set a championship record of 17.53 to beat his nearest rival, Britain's Dan Bramall, by over a second and a half. Almutairi also competed in the 800m T34, but he finished a distant 8th.
