= Kuwait at the 2016 Summer Paralympics =

- IPC code: KUW
- NPC: Kuwait Paralympic Committee

in Rio de Janeiro
- Competitors: 6 in 2 sports
- Medals Ranked 60th: Gold 1 Silver 0 Bronze 0 Total 1

Summer Paralympics appearances (overview)
- 1980; 1984; 1988; 1992; 1996; 2000; 2004; 2008; 2012; 2016; 2020; 2024

Kuwait competed at the 2016 Summer Paralympics in Rio de Janeiro, Brazil, from 7 September to 18 September 2016. The Kuwait Paralympic team competed under its own national flag, despite the Olympic team being suspended by the IOC.

== Disability classifications ==
Every participant at the Paralympics has their disability grouped into one of five disability categories; amputation, the condition may be congenital or sustained through injury or illness; cerebral palsy; wheelchair athletes, there is often overlap between this and other categories; visual impairment, including blindness; Les autres, any physical disability that does not fall strictly under one of the other categories, for example dwarfism or multiple sclerosis. Each Paralympic sport then has its own classifications, dependent upon the specific physical demands of competition. Events are given a code, made of numbers and letters, describing the type of event and classification of the athletes competing. Some sports, such as athletics, divide athletes by both the category and severity of their disabilities, other sports, for example swimming, group competitors from different categories together, the only separation being based on the severity of the disability.

== Medallists ==
| Medal | Name | Sport | Event | Date |
|---|---|---|---|---|
| Gold | Ahmad Almutairi | Athletics | Men's 100 m T33 | 10 September |

== Athletics ==
Men's Track

| Athlete | Events | Heat | | Final | |
| Athlete | Events | Time | Rank | Time | Rank |
|---|---|---|---|---|---|
| Ahmad Almutairi | 100 m T33 | —N/a | | 16.61 | 1st place, gold medalist(s) |
| Naser Saleh | 100 m T33 | —N/a | | 21.22 | 5 |
| Hamad Aladwani | 100 m T53 | 15.97 | 5 | did not advance | |
| Hamad Aladwani | 400 m T53 | 52.97 | 6 | did not advance | |
| Hamad Aladwani | 800 m T52-53 | 1:43.69 | 5 Q | 1:50.62 | 8 |

Men's Field

| Athlete | Events | Result | Rank |
|---|---|---|---|
| Mohammad Nasser | Shot Put F32 | 7.67 | 7 |
| Abdullah Alsaif | Shot Put F40 | 6.75 | 10 |

== Shooting ==
The country sent shooters to 2015 IPC IPC Shooting World Cup in Osijek, Croatia, where Rio direct qualification was available. They earned a qualifying spot at this event based on the performance of Atef Aldousari in the R4 – 10m Air Rifle Standing Mixed SH2 event.

| Athlete | Event | Qualification | | Final | |
| Athlete | Event | Score | Rank | Score | Rank |
|---|---|---|---|---|---|
| Atef Aldousari | Mixed 10 m air rifle standing SH2 | 630.8 | 6 Q | 124.9 | 6 |
| Atef Aldousari | Mixed 10 m air rifle prone SH2 | 634.1 | 7 Q | 146.5 | 5 |

== See also ==
- Independent Olympic Athletes at the 2016 Summer Olympics
