= Philipp Handler =

Swiss Paralympic sprinter (born 1991)

Personal information
- Born: 8 October 1991 (age 34) New York City, United States
- Height: 1.87 m (6 ft 2 in)

Sport
- Country: Switzerland
- Sport: Paralympic athletics
- Disability: Achromatopsia, nystagmus
- Disability class: T13
Medal record
Paralympic athletics
Representing Switzerland
European Championships
Silver medal – second place	2012 Stadskanaal	Men's 100m T13
Bronze medal – third place	2012 Stadskanaal	Men's 200m T13
Bronze medal – third place	2014 Swansea	Men's 100m T13
Bronze medal – third place	2016 Grosseto	Men's 100m T13
Bronze medal – third place	2018 Berlin	Men's 200m T13

Philipp Handler (born 8 October 1991, in New York City) is a Swiss Paralympic sprinter who competes in international level events. He is a five time European medalist and has participated at the Paralympic Games in 2012 and 2016 but did not medal. He moved from New York City to Embrach, Switzerland when he was five years old.
