= Bojan Mitic =

Swiss Paralympic athlete (born 1985)

Personal information
- Born: 27 August 1985 (age 40) Lucerne, Switzerland
- Height: 190 cm (75 in)

Sport
- Disability: cerebral palsy
- Disability class: T13
- Event: sprints
- Club: RC Zentralschweiz: Kriens
- Coached by: Paul Odermatt (national)
Medal record
Men's paralympic athletics
Representing Switzerland
IPC World Championships
Bronze medal – third place	2015 Doha	100 m T34
IPC European Championships
Silver medal – second place	2014 Swansea	100 m – T34
Silver medal – second place	2014 Swansea	400 m – T34
Bronze medal – third place	2014 Swansea	200 m – T34

Bojan Mitic (born 27 August 1985) is a Paralympian Track and field athlete from Switzerland competing mainly in category T34 sprint events.

== Personal history ==
Mitic was born in Lucerne in Switzerland in 1985. He was born premature which resulted in cerebral palsy. He is an engineer by trade.

== Athletics career ==
Mitic first represented Switzerland at the 2004 Summer Paralympics in Athens. He entered three sprint events but did not finish in a podium place. At the 2012 Summer Paralympics in London he finished just outside the medal positions in fourth in both the T34 100m and 200m sprints. In 2015 in Doha, Mitic won a bronze medal at the World Championships in Doha in the 100m race.
