= Arnu Fourie =

South African Paralympic athlete

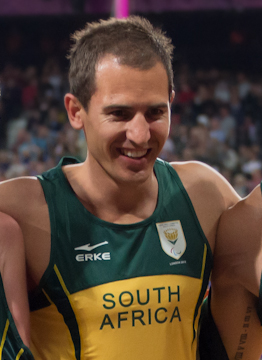
- Arnu Fourie at the 2016 Summer Paralympics

Personal information
- Full name: Arnu Fourie
- Nationality: (South Africa) South African
- Born: 24 April 1985 (age 41) South Africa
Medal record
Track and field (athletics)
Representing South Africa
Gold medal – first place	2011 Golden League Meet
IPC World Championships
Gold medal – first place	2011 Christchurch	4x100m - T42-46
Silver medal – second place	2015 Doha	Men's 100m T44
Paralympic Games
Gold medal – first place	2012 London	4x100m - T42-46
Bronze medal – third place	2012 London	Men's 100m T44

Arnu Fourie (born 24 April 1985) is a South African Paralympian athlete who runs in the T44 class. His is a single-below-the-knee amputee.

== Life and career ==
Fourie was born in Bloemfontein, and lost his left leg below the knee in a boating propeller accident in 2003. He was a rugby player at the time, and was signed by the Golden Lions before his accident. He initially lost interest in sports, but he took up running after the death of a friend convinced him that he should be more active. Fourie graduated from Stellenbosch University and is employed as an accountant in Stellenbosch. He trains at the Maties Helderberg Sports Club for Disabled Athletes under coach Suzanne Ferreira.

Fourie participated in the 2008 Paralympic Games in Beijing, taking 4th place in the 100 m and 6th place in the 200 m final. He won a gold medal in the IAAF Golden League Meet in Paris in 2011, and a gold medal as part of the 4x100 relay team at the 2011 IPC Athletics World Championships in Christchurch, New Zealand.

Fourie won a gold medal at the 2012 Summer Paralympic Games in London on 5 September 2012, running the third leg as part of the South African 4 × 100 m relay team in a world record time of 41.78 seconds. He won a bronze medal in the 100 meter event with a time of 11.08 seconds. He set a T44 world record in his 200-meter heat, then broke it in the final; he placed fourth overall in the event behind T43 classified athletes.

He is married to Carene Fourie née Zaayman.

== See also ==
- The Mechanics of Running Blades
