= Hu Jianwen =

Chinese Paralympic athlete (born 1987)

Jianwen Hu
Personal information
- Born: 12 August 1987 (age 38) China

Sport
- Sport: Athletics
- Event(s): Sprint, long jump
Medal record
Men's Paralympic athletics
Representing China
Summer Paralympics
Gold medal – first place	2016 Rio de Janeiro	Men's 100 metres T38
IPC World Championships
Gold medal – first place	2017 London	Long jump - T38

Jianwen Hu (born 12 August 1987) is a Paralympic Chinese athlete competing in T38 classification track and field events. He won the gold medal at the Men's 100 metres T38 event at the 2016 Summer Paralympics, with 10.74 seconds.
