= Leinier Savon Pineda =

Cuban Paralympic sprinter

Leinier Savón Pineda
Personal information
- Born: 21 March 1989 (age 37) Guantánamo, Cuba

Sport
- Country: Cuba
- Sport: Sprinting, long jump
Medal record
Track and field
Summer Paralympics
Gold medal – first place	2016 Rio de Janeiro	100 metres T12
Gold medal – first place	2016 Rio de Janeiro	200 metres T12
World Championships
Gold medal – first place	2015 Doha	100m T12
Gold medal – first place	2015 Doha	200m T12
Gold medal – first place	2017 London	100m T12
Parapan American Games
Gold medal – first place	2015 Toronto	100m T12
Gold medal – first place	2015 Toronto	200m T12
Gold medal – first place	2019 Lima	Long jump T11/12
Silver medal – second place	2015 Toronto	Long jump T11/12
Bronze medal – third place	2019 Lima	100m T12

Leinier Savón Pineda (born 21 March 1989) is a Cuban visually impaired sprinter and long jumper. He made his international debut in 2014 and earned two gold medals in the 2016 Summer Paralympics. He is the cousin of heavyweight boxer Félix Savón.

== Early life ==
Savon Pineda was born visually impaired but was unable to be officially diagnosed until he was more than a year old. During the wait, his mother enrolled him in a sports area but was unable to enter the School of Sports Initiation due to his height. As well, after finishing high school he was unable to enlist due to his visual impairment.

== Career ==
Savon Pineda joined the Cuban national team in 2012, with whom he won the men's 100m and 200m T12 at the 2015 IPC Athletics World Championships and the men's 100m and 200m T12 at the 2015 Parapan American Games. He also set a new Americas record during the Championships with a time of 22.14. Following the Championship, Savon Pineda qualified for the 2016 Summer Paralympics, where he won two more gold medals in the men's 100m T1 and 200m T12. The following year, Savon Pineda took home another gold medal in the Men's 100m T12 at the 2017 World Para Athletics Championships.

== Personal life ==
Savon Pineda is the cousin of heavyweight boxer Félix Savón.
