= 2013 IPC Athletics World Championships – Men's 100 metres =

The men's 100 metres at the 2013 IPC Athletics World Championships was held at the Stade du Rhône from 20–29 July.

== Medalists ==
Class	Gold	Silver	Bronze
T11	Lucas Prado; Brazil	Felipe Gomes; Brazil	Ananias Shikongo; Namibia
T12	Mateusz Michalski; Poland	Artem Loginov; Russia	Maximiliano Rodriguez Magi; Spain
T13	Jason Smyth; Ireland	Jonathan Ntutu; South Africa	Radoslav Zlatanov; Bulgaria
T34	Walid Ktila; Tunisia	Rheed McCracken; Australia	Stefan Rusch; Netherlands
T35	Dmitrii Safronov; Russia	Iurii Tsaruk; Ukraine	Hernan Barreto; Argentina
T36	Evgenii Shvetcov; Russia	Roman Pavlyk; Ukraine	Graeme Ballard; United Kingdom
T37	Andrey Vdovin; Russia	Roman Kapranov; Russia	Omar Monterola; Venezuela
T38	Evan O'Hanlon; Australia	Dyan Buis; South Africa	Edson Pinheiro; Brazil
T42	Heinrich Popow; Germany Scott Reardon; Australia	N/A	Clavel Kayitare; France
T43	Alan Oliveira; Brazil	Blake Leeper; United States	Joshua Kennison; United States
T44	Jonnie Peacock; United Kingdom	Richard Browne; United States	Jerome Singleton; United States
T46	Michal Derus; Poland	Gabriel Cole; Australia	Yohansson Nascimento; Brazil
T51	Toni Piispanen; Finland	Mohamed Berrahal; Algeria	Alvise De Vidi; Italy
T52	Raymond Martin; United States	Salvador Hernández; Mexico	Gianfranco Iannotta; United States
T53	Brent Lakatos; Canada	Mickey Bushell; United Kingdom	Ariosvaldo Silva; Brazil
T54	Leo Pekka Tahti; Finland	Kenny van Weeghel; Netherlands	Marc Schuh; Germany

== Results ==
=== T11 ===
Round 1

Rank	Heat	Sport Class	Name	Nationality	Time	Notes
1	3	T11	Ananias Shikongo; Guide: Even Tjiviju	Namibia	11.33	Q, CR
2	2	T11	Felipe Gomes; Guide: Jorge Borges	Brazil	11.34	Q, CR
3	4	T11	Lucas Prado; Guide: Lorenzo Alves Martins	Brazil	11.41	Q
4	1	T11	Octavio Santos; Guide: Nicolau Ernesto Palanca	Angola	11.60	Q
5	1	T11	Xue Lei; Guide: Wang Lin	China	11.62	q
5	3	T11	Elchin Muradov; Guide: Valentin Bulichev	Azerbaijan	11.62	q
7	3	T11	Fernando Ferrer; Guide: Javier Herrera	Venezuela	11.69	q, PB
8	4	T11	Jesus Diaz; Guide: Manuel de La Rosa	Venezuela	11.72	q
9	1	T11	Andrey Koptev; Guide: Sergey Petrichenko	Russia	11.73	
10	4	T11	Firmino Baptista; Guide: Ivo Vital	Portugal	11.82	SB
11	2	T11	Martin Parejo Maza; Guide: Timoteo Stewart Ortiz	Spain	11.92	PB
12	2	T11	Elexis Gillette; Guide: Wesley Williams	United States	11.98	
13	2	T11	Kitsana Jorchuy; Guide: Patchai Srikhamphan	Thailand	12.00	
14	3	T11	Xavier Porras; Guide:Enric Ismael Martin Panades	Spain	12.09	
15	4	T11	Alexis Acosta; Guide: Jose Pignataro	Argentina	13.47	
—	1	T11	Gauthier Tresor Makunda; Guide: Edgar Onezou	France	DNF	

Semifinals

Rank	Heat	Sport Class	Name	Nationality	Time	Notes
1	1	T11	Lucas Prado	Brazil	11.08	Q, CR
2	1	T11	Ananias Shikongo	Namibia	11.32	q,
3	2	T11	Felipe Gomes	Brazil	11.35	Q
4	2	T11	Xue Lei	China	11.63	q
5	2	T11	Elchin Muradov	Azerbaijan	11.68	
6	2	T11	Octavio Santos	Angola	11.70	
7	1	T11	Jesus Diaz	Venezuela	11.71	
8	2	T11	Fernando Ferrer	Venezuela	11.88	

Final

Rank	Sport Class	Name	Nationality	Time	Notes
1st place, gold medalist(s)	T11	Lucas Prado	Brazil	11.45	
2nd place, silver medalist(s)	T11	Felipe Gomes	Brazil	11.68	
3rd place, bronze medalist(s)	T11	Ananias Shikongo	Namibia	11.85	
4	T11	Xue Lei	China	12.15	

== See also ==
- List of IPC world records in athletics
