= 2013 IPC Athletics World Championships – Men's 10,000 metres =

The men's 10,000 metres at the 2013 IPC Athletics World Championships was held at the Stade du Rhône from 20–29 July.

== Medalists ==
Class	Gold	Silver	Bronze
T12	El Amin Chentouf; Morocco	Nacer-Eddine Karfas; Algeria	Gustavo Nieves Campello; Spain
T54	Marcel Hug; Switzerland	Sho Watanabe; Japan	Jean-Paul Compaore; Canada

== See also ==
- List of IPC world records in athletics
