= 2013 IPC Athletics World Championships – Men's 800 metres =

The men's 800 metres at the 2013 IPC Athletics World Championships was held at the Stade du Rhône from 20 to 29 July.

== Medalists ==
Class	Gold	Silver	Bronze
T11	Odair Santos; Brazil	William Sosa; Colombia	Hasan Huseyin Kacar; Turkey
T12	Egor Sharov; Russia	Abderrahim Zhiou; Tunisia	Yeltsin Jacques; Brazil
T13	Abdellatif Baka; Algeria	Lukasz Wietecki; Poland	Abdelillah Mame; Morocco
T34	Walid Ktila; Tunisia	Mohamed Hammadi; United Arab Emirates	Rheed McCracken; Australia
T36	Paul Blake; United Kingdom	Artem Arefyev; Russia	Pavel Kharagezov; Russia
T37	Michael McKillop; Ireland	Brad Scott; Australia	Charl du Toit; South Africa
T46	Hermas Muvunyi; Rwanda	Samir Nouioua; Algeria	Alex Pires; Brazil
T52	Raymond Martin; United States	Leonardo De Jesus Perez Juarez; Mexico	Steven Toyoji; United States
T53	Joshua George; United States	Brent Lakatos; Canada	Pierre Fairbank; France
T54	Kim Gyu-Dae; South Korea	Marcel Hug; Switzerland	Saichon Konjen; Thailand

== See also ==
- List of IPC world records in athletics
