= 2013 IPC Athletics World Championships – Men's 400 metres =

The men's 400 metres at the 2013 IPC Athletics World Championships was held at the Stade du Rhône from 20–29 July. There were 12 categories contested over the 400m at the championship. Two World records were set in the 400m, Chermen Kobesov of Russia posted a time of 51.88s in the T37 class, while Ahmad Almutairi of Kuwait recorded a time of 57.95s in the T33 category. Almutairi's category was not part of the schedule of this championship, but he qualified to compete in the T34 category. Despite coming last in his qualifying round and not advancing to the final he still broke the T33 world record.

== Medalists ==
Class	Gold	Silver	Bronze
T11	Daniel Silva CR; Brazil	David Brown; United States	Timothee Adolphe; France
T12	Egor Sharov; Russia	Thomas Ulbricht; Germany	Hyacinthe Deleplace; France
T13	Johannes Nambala CR; Namibia	Alexander Zverev; Russia	Luis Manuel Galano; Cuba
T34	Walid Ktila; Tunisia	Rheed McCracken; Australia	Mohamed Hammadi; United Arab Emirates
T36	Evgenii Shvetcov; Russia	Paul Blake; United Kingdom	Andrey Zhirnov; Russia
T37	Chermen Kobesov WR; Russia	Sofiane Hamdi; Algeria	Charl Du Toit; South Africa
T38	Evan O'Hanlon; Australia	Dyan Buis; South Africa	Union Sekailwe; South Africa
T44	Alan Oliveira CR; Brazil	Blake Leeper; United States	David Prince; United States
T46	Gunther Matzinger; Austria	Ettiam Calderon; Cuba	Pradeep Uggl Dena Pathirannehelag; Sri Lanka
T52	Raymond Martin CR; United States	Steven Toyoji; United States	Thomas Geierspichler; Austria
T53	Brent Lakatos CR; Canada	Li Huzhao; China	Richard Colman; Australia
T54	Marcel Hug CR; Switzerland	Marc Schuh; Germany	Kenny van Weeghel; Netherlands

CR - Championship record, WR - World record

== See also ==
- List of IPC world records in athletics
