= 2013 IPC Athletics World Championships – Men's 4 × 100 metres relay =

The men's 4x100 metres relay at the 2013 IPC Athletics World Championships was held at the Stade du Rhône from 20–29 July.

== Medalists ==
Class	Gold	Silver	Bronze
T11-13	Artem Loginov; Alexander Zverev; Fedor Trikolich; Andrey Koptex; Russia	Markeith Price; David Brown; Elexis Gillette; Josiah Jamison; United States	Hyacinthe Deleplace; Antoine Perel; Bacou Dambakate; Gauthier Makunda; France
T35-38	Andrey Vdovin; Gocha Khugaev; Roman Kapranov; Evgenii Shvetcov; Russia	Charl du Toit; Union Sekailwe; Fanie van der Merwe; Dyan Buis; South Africa	Andriy Onufriyenko; Iurii Tsaruk; Roman Pavlyk; Mykyta Senyk; Ukraine
T42-46	Jerome Singleton; Richard Browne; Jarryd Wallace; Blake Leeper; United States	Bruno Araujo; Yohansson Nascimento; Emicarlo Souza; Alan Oliveira; Brazil	Yury Nosulenko; Vadim Trunov; Diias Izbasarov; Ivan Prokopyev; Russia

== See also ==
- List of IPC world records in athletics
