= Athletics at the 2008 Summer Paralympics – Men's 800 metres T36 =

The Men's 800m T36 had its Final held on September 16 at 11:03.

== Medalists ==
Gold	Artem Arefyev; Russia
Silver	Chengen He; China
Bronze	Pavel Kharagezov; Russia

== Results ==
Place	Athlete	Final
1	Artem Arefyev (RUS)	2:08.83 WR
2	Chengen He (CHN)	2:14.76
3	Pavel Kharagezov (RUS)	2:14.80
4	Jose Manuel Gonzalez (ESP)	2:15.26
5	Serhiy Sakovskyy (UKR)	2:15.84
6	Jose Maria Pampano (ESP)	2:18.01
7	Jakub Rega (POL)	2:23.70
8	Robert Plichta (POL)	2:27.89
9	Fouad Hizraoui (MAR)	2:32.09
