= 2013 IPC Athletics World Championships – Men's 5000 metres =

The men's 5,000 metres at the 2013 IPC Athletics World Championships was held at the Stade du Rhône from 20–29 July 2013.

== Medalists ==
Class	Gold	Silver	Bronze
T11	Odair Santos; Brazil	Cristian Valenzuela; Chile	Nuno Alves; Portugal
T12	El Amin Chentouf; Morocco	Abderrahim Zhiou; Tunisia	Nacer-Eddine Karfas; Algeria
T46	Samir Nouioua; Algeria	Alex Peris; Brazil	Michael Roeger; Australia
T54	Marcel Hug; Switzerland	Masayuki Higuchi; Japan	Richard Colman; Australia

== See also ==
- List of IPC world records in athletics
