= 2013 IPC Athletics World Championships – Men's long jump =

Men's long jump 2013 IPC world championship

The men's long jump at the 2013 IPC Athletics World Championships was held at the Stade du Rhône from 20–29 July.

== Medalists ==
Class	Gold	Silver	Bronze
T11	Elexis Gillette; United States	Yang Chuan-Hui; Chinese Taipei	Xavier Porras; Spain
T12	Hilton Langenhoven; South Africa	Kamil Aliyev; Azerbaijan	Rza Osmanov; Azerbaijan
T13	Luis Felipe Gutiérrez; Cuba	Ihar Fartunau; Belarus	Per Jonsson; Sweden
T20	Dmytro Prudnikov; Ukraine	Zoran Talic; Croatia	Lenine Cunha; Portugal
T36	Roman Pavlyk; Ukraine	Mariusz Sobczak; Poland	Marcin Mielczarek; Poland
T37/38	Andriy Onufriyenko; Ukraine	Chermen Kobesov; Russia	Andrea Dalle Ave; South Africa
T42	Atsushi Yamamoto; Japan	Rudy Garcia-Tolson; United States	Heinrich Popow; Germany
T44	Markus Rehm; Germany	Ronald Hertog; Netherlands	Maciej Lepiato; Poland
T46	Liu Fuliang; China	Tobi Fawehinmi; United States	Arnaud Assoumani; France

== See also ==
- List of IPC world records in athletics
