= 2013 IPC Athletics World Championships – Women's 800 metres =

The women's 800 metres at the 2013 IPC Athletics World Championships was held at the Stade du Rhône from 20–29 July.

== Medalists ==
Class	Gold	Silver	Bronze
T11	Annalisa Minetti; Italy	Maritza Arango Buitrago; Colombia	Miroslava Sedlackova; Czech Republic
T52	Michelle Stilwell; Canada	Kerry Morgan; United States	Cassie Mitchell; United States
T53	Zhou Hongzhuan; China	Angela Ballard; Australia	Madison de Rozario; Australia
T54	Tatyana McFadden; United States	Manuela Schaer; Switzerland	Edith Wolf; Switzerland

== See also ==
- List of IPC world records in athletics
