= 2013 IPC Athletics World Championships – Women's 5000 metres =

The women's 5,000 metres at the 2013 IPC Athletics World Championships was held at the Stade du Rhône from 20–29 July.

== Medalists ==
Class	Gold	Silver	Bronze
T54	Tatyana McFadden; United States	Manuela Schaer; Switzerland	Edith Wolf; Switzerland

== See also ==
- List of IPC world records in athletics
