= Leonardo de Jesús Pérez Juárez =

Mexican Paralympic athlete

Personal information
- Born: 10 February 1993 (age 33)
- Height: 140 cm (4 ft 7 in)

Sport
- Country: Mexico
- Sport: Paralympic athletics
- Disability class: T52
- Events: sprints, middle-distance races
- Club: Tlaxcala
- Coached by: Martín Díaz López (national)
Medal record
Representing Mexico
Paralympic Games
Bronze medal – third place	2012 London	800m T52
Bronze medal – third place	2020 Tokyo	100m T52
World Championships
Silver medal – second place	2013 Lyon	800m T52
Bronze medal – third place	2013 Lyon	200m – T52
Bronze medal – third place	2023 Paris	100m T52
Bronze medal – third place	2024 Kobe	1500m T52
Bronze medal – third place	2025 New Delhi	1500m T52

Leonardo de Jesús Pérez Juárez (born 10 February 1993) is a Paralympic athlete from Mexico who competes in T52 track and field events.

== Athletics career ==
Pérez, who is classified as a T52 classification wheelchair racer, represented Mexico at the 2012 Summer Paralympics in London competing in the 200, 400 and 800 metres races. He was disqualified in the first round of the 400m event, but came fifth in the 200 metres and won a bronze medal in the 800 metres. As well as Paralympic success, Pérez has won two medals at the IPC Athletics World Championships, both coming in 2013 in Lyon, with a silver in the 800 m and bronze in the 200 m.

== Personal history ==
Pérez was born in Mexico in 1993 and attended the International College for Experienced Learning in Mexico City.
