= 2013 IPC Athletics World Championships – Men's club throw =

The men's club throw at the 2013 IPC Athletics World Championships was held at the Stade du Rhône from 20–29 July.

== Medalists ==
Class	Gold	Silver	Bronze
F31/32/51	Lahouari Bahlaz; Algeria	Maciej Sochal; Poland	Jan Vanek; Czech Republic

== See also ==
- List of IPC world records in athletics
