= 2013 IPC Athletics World Championships – Women's club throw =

The women's club throw at the 2013 IPC Athletics World Championships was held at the Stade du Rhône from 20 to 29 July 2013.

== Medalists ==
Class	Gold	Silver	Bronze
F31/32/51	Maroua Ibrahmi; Tunisia	Becky Richter; Canada	Josie Pearson; United Kingdom

== See also ==
- List of IPC world records in athletics
