= Andrey Vdovin =

Russian Paralympic athlete

Personal information
- Full name: Andrey Nikolaevich Vdovin
- Nationality: Russian
- Born: 26 February 1994 (age 32) Dzerzhinsk, Russia

Sport
- Country: Russia
- Sport: Paralympic athletics
- Disability class: T37
- Events: Sprint; Middle distance
Medal record
| Event | 1st | 2nd | 3rd |
|---|---|---|---|
| Paralympic Games | 3 | 2 | 1 |
| World Championships | 9 | 1 | 1 |
| European Championships | 8 | 1 | 0 |
Paralympic athletics
Summer Paralympics
Representing Neutral Paralympic Athletes (NPA)
| Gold medal – first place | 2024 Paris | 200m T37 |
| Gold medal – first place | 2024 Paris | 400m T37 |
| Bronze medal – third place | 2024 Paris | 100m T37 |
Representing RPC
| Gold medal – first place | 2020 Tokyo | 400m T37 |
| Silver medal – second place | 2020 Tokyo | 100m T37 |
| Silver medal – second place | 2020 Tokyo | 200m T37 |
Representing Neutral Paralympic Athletes (NPA)
World Championships
| Gold medal – first place | 2024 Kobe | 200m T37 |
| Silver medal – second place | 2024 Kobe | 100 m T37 |
| Silver medal – second place | 2024 Kobe | 400 m T37 |
| Bronze medal – third place | 2025 New Delhi | 200m T37 |
Representing Russia
World Championships
| Gold medal – first place | 2013 Lyon | 100m T37 |
| Gold medal – first place | 2013 Lyon | 200m T37 |
| Gold medal – first place | 2013 Lyon | 4x100m T35-38 |
| Gold medal – first place | 2015 Doha | 100m T37 |
| Gold medal – first place | 2015 Doha | 200m T37 |
| Gold medal – first place | 2015 Doha | 400m T37 |
| Gold medal – first place | 2019 Dubai | 100m T37 |
| Gold medal – first place | 2019 Dubai | 200m T37 |
| Gold medal – first place | 2019 Dubai | 400m T37 |
European Championships
| Gold medal – first place | 2014 Swansea | 100m T37 |
| Gold medal – first place | 2014 Swansea | 200m T37 |
| Gold medal – first place | 2014 Swansea | 400m T37 |
| Gold medal – first place | 2016 Grosseto | 100m T38 |
| Gold medal – first place | 2016 Grosseto | 400m T38 |
| Gold medal – first place | 2021 Bydgoszcz | 100m T37 |
| Gold medal – first place | 2021 Bydgoszcz | 200m T37 |
| Gold medal – first place | 2021 Bydgoszcz | 400m T37 |
| Silver medal – second place | 2016 Grosseto | 200m T38 |

Andrey Nikolaevich Vdovin (Russian: Андрей Николаевич Вдовин, also transliterated Andrei Vdovin, born 26 February 1994) is a Russian parasport athlete competing mainly in category T37 sprint and middle-distance events. A triple gold medal winner at the 2013 IPC Athletics World Championships, Vdovin also set three world records in his class between 2013 and 2014.

== Personal history ==
Vdovin was born in Dzerzhinsk, Russia in 1994. He has cerebral palsy. After leaving secondary education he enrolled at the Nizhny Novgorod State Technical University to study Information Technology.

== Athletics career ==
Vdovin took up athletics at the age of 10 and later joined the Specialised Children's Youth Sport School of Olympic Reserve in Zarya. He was classified as a T37 athlete, due to limited motor function resulting from his cerebral palsy. In 2013 he was selected to represent Russia at the IPC World Championships in Lyon. There he entered three events, the 100m, 200m and the 4 × 100 m - T35-38. He won gold in all three and set a world record in both the 100m (11.48) and the 200m (22.77). His winning time in the 200m saw him become the first man to run under 23 seconds in his classification. In the T35-38 100m relay, he was joined by Gocha Khugaev, Roman Kapranov and Evgenii Shvetcov, beating South Africa (silver) and Ukraine (bronze) in the final.

The following year he represented Russia at Nottwil in Switzerland in an open meet. There he entered the 400m middle-distance event where his time of 51.67 not only gave him the gold medal, but also set a new world record. Three months later he was back in the Russian team at the 2014 IPC Athletics European Championships in Swansea. He entered the 100m and 200m sprint events along with and the 400m. Vdovin won both the sprint events and broke his own world record in the 400m with a time of 50.91 seconds.
