= 2013 IPC Athletics World Championships – Men's 1500 metres =

The men's 1,500 metres at the 2013 IPC Athletics World Championships was held at the Stade du Rhône from 20–29 July.

== Medalists ==
Class	Gold	Silver	Bronze
T11	Odair Santos; Brazil	Cristian Valenzuela; Chile	William Sosa; Colombia
T12	Abderrahim Zhiou; Tunisia	Yeltsin Jacques; Brazil	Semih Deniz; Turkey
T13	Abdellatif Baka; Algeria	Youssef Benibrahim; Morocco	Tarik Zalzouli; Morocco
T20	Peyman Nasiri Bazanjani; Iran	Daniel Pek; Poland	Viacheslav Khrustalev; Russia
T36	Artem Arefyev; Russia	Pavel Kharagezov; Russia	Jose Pampano Cillero; Spain
T38	Michael McKillop; Ireland	Abbes Saidi; Tunisia	Deon Kenzie; Australia
T46	Samir Nouioua; Algeria	Alex Pires; Brazil	Michael Roeger; Australia
T52	Raymond Martin; United States	Thomas Geierspichler; Austria	Steven Toyoji; United States
T54	Marcel Hug; Switzerland	Rawat Tana; Thailand	Masayuki Higuchi; Japan

== See also ==
- List of IPC world records in athletics
