= 2013 IPC Athletics World Championships – Men's triple jump =

The men's triple jump at the 2013 IPC Athletics World Championships was held at the Stade du Rhône from 20–29 July.

== Medalists ==
Class	Gold	Silver	Bronze
T11	Ruslan Katyshev; Ukraine	Elexis Gillette; United States	Firas Bentria; Algeria
T12	Vladimir Zayets; Azerbaijan	Doniyor Saliev; Uzbekistan	Siarhei Burdukou; Belarus
T46	Liu Fuliang; China	Aliaksandr Subota; Belarus	Georgios Kostakis; Greece

== See also ==
- List of IPC world records in athletics
