= Lee Whiteley =

British Paralympic athlete (born 1989)

Personal information
- Nationality: British
- Born: 12 July 1989 (age 37)

Sport
- Country: Great Britain
- Sport: Athletics
- Disability: Cerebral palsy
- Disability class: T38
- Club: Sale Harriers
- Coached by: Keith Hunter
Medal record
Men's athletics
Representing Great Britain
IPC Athletics World Championships
Bronze medal – third place	2013 Lyon	200m - T38

Lee Whiteley (born 12 July 1989) is a British para-sport athlete who competes mainly in category T38 sprint events. Whiteley was born with cerebral palsy, but he did not begin competing in disability sporting events until an illness in 2011 resulted in him inquiring about disability sport. In 2013 he won his first major international medal with a bronze medal at the IPC Athletic World Championship in the 200m.

== Career history ==
Whiteley was born in England in 1989. Although born with cerebral palsy, when he initially became interested in sports, he competed as an able bodied athlete. His introduction to athletics occurred in his first year of secondary school, while competing at cross country running. He was spotted by the Sale Harriers sporting club and began training with the club. Initially training at long-distance events, his coaches brought him down to mid-distance races.

In 2011 Whitley fell gravely ill and was told by doctors he would not walk again, though he made a swift recovery. In January 2012 he enquired about disability sport and was nationally classified as a T35 athlete in July 2012 allowing him to compete at the Birmingham Games. In March 2013 he travelled to Dubai where he entered the Fazaa International competition running in both the 100m and 200m T35 sprints. His winning times of 11.60s (100m) and 24.79 (200m) were announced as new world records.

Whiteley's first major international event was the 2013 IPC Athletics World Championships in Lyon, where he competed as a member of the Great Britain team. Now re-classified by the international board as a T38 athlete, he entered both the 100m and 200m sprints. Whiteley stated that he was mainly there for the experience of attending a major competition and did not expect to medal. He qualified through the semifinals of the 100m in first place, posting a personal best time of 11.31 seconds. In the final he ran 11.33 to finish just outside the medals in fourth place. In the 200m he qualified through the semifinals in second place behind Australia's Evan O'Hanlon in a time of 23.20, an area record. He surpassed that time in the finals, running 23.00 to finish in third place and collected his first international medal.
