= 2013 IPC Athletics World Championships – Men's 200 metres =

The men's 200 metres at the 2013 IPC Athletics World Championships was held at the Stade du Rhône from 20–29 July. In T11, Lucas Prado of Brazil won the gold. Following are the complete results:

== Medalists ==
Class	Gold	Silver	Bronze
T11	Lucas Prado; Brazil	Ananias Shikongo; Namibia	Daniel Silva; Brazil
T12	Mateusz Michalski; Poland	Fedor Trikolich; Russia	Artem Loginov; Russia
T13	Jason Smyth; Ireland	Johannes Nambala; Namibia	Jonathan Ntutu; South Africa
T34	Walid Ktila; Tunisia	Rheed McCracken; Australia	Henry Manni; Finland
T35	Dmitrii Safronov; Russia	Iurii Tsaruk; Ukraine	Hernan Barreto; Argentina
T36	Evgenii Shvetcov; Russia	Roman Pavlyk; Ukraine	Wa Wai So; Hong Kong
T37	Andrey Vdovin; Russia	Fanie van der Merwe; South Africa	Sofiane Hamdi; Algeria
T38	Evan O'Hanlon; Australia	Dyan Buis; South Africa	Lee Whiteley; United Kingdom
T42	Richard Whitehead; United Kingdom	Scott Reardon; Australia	Heinrich Popow; Germany
T43	Alan Oliveira; Brazil	Blake Leeper; United States	David Behre; Germany
T44	Jarryd Wallace; United States	David Prince; United States	Jerome Singleton; United States
T46	Yohansson Nascimento; Brazil	Michal Derus; Poland	Isidoria Gonzalez; Cuba
T51	Edgar Navarro; Mexico	Toni Piispanen; Finland	Alvise de Vidi; Italy
T52	Raymond Martin; United States	Gianfranco Iannotta; United States	Leonardo De Jesus Perez Juarez; Mexico
T53	Brent Lakatos; Canada	Li Huzhao; China	Pierre Fairbank; France
T54	Kenny van Weeghel; Netherlands	Leo Pekka Tahti; Finland	Saichon Konjen; Thailand

== See also ==
- List of IPC world records in athletics
