= 2015 IPC Athletics World Championships – Men's 1500 metres =

The men's 1,500 metres at the 2015 IPC Athletics World Championships was held at the Suheim Bin Hamad Stadium in Doha from 22–31 October.

== Medalists ==
Event	Gold		Silver		Bronze	
T11	Odair Santos; Guide: Carlos Antonio dos Santos; Brazil	4:08.48 SB	Cristian Valenzuela; Guide: Mauricio Valdivia; Chile	4:14.00 SB	Hasan Huseyin Kacar; Guide: ? Turkey	4:16.58 PB
T13	Abdelillah Mame (T13); Morocco	3:54.34 PB	Abdellatif Baka (T13); Algeria	3:55.74 SB	El Amin Chentouf (T12); Morocco	3:56.49 SB
T20	Michael Brannigan; United States	3:56.50 CR	Peyman Nasiri Bazanjani; Iran	3:56.53 AR	Alexander Rabotnitskiy; Russia	3:58.23 PB
T37	Michael McKillop; Ireland	4:16.19	Brad Scott; Australia	4:21.12	Madjid Djemai; Algeria	4:29.24
T38	Abbes Saidi; Tunisia	4:09.92 CR	Louis Radius; France	4:10.87 AR	Deon Kenzie; Australia	4:11.60
T46	Samir Nouioua; Algeria	3:53.36 CR	Alex Pires Da Silva; Brazil	3:54.53 AR	Michael Roeger; Australia	3:57.91 AR
T52	Raymond Martin; United States	3:49.41 CR	Hirokazu Ueyonabaru; Japan	3:49.62 AR	Tomoki Sato; Japan	3:49.79 PB
T54	Rawat Tana; Thailand	3:04.35	David Weir; Great Britain	3:04.46	Saichon Konjen; Thailand	3:04.88
WR world record | AR area record | CR championship record | GR games record | NR national record | OR Olympic record | PB personal best | SB season best | WL world leading (in a given season)

== See also ==
- List of IPC world records in athletics
