= Evgeny Shvetsov =

Russian Paralympic athlete

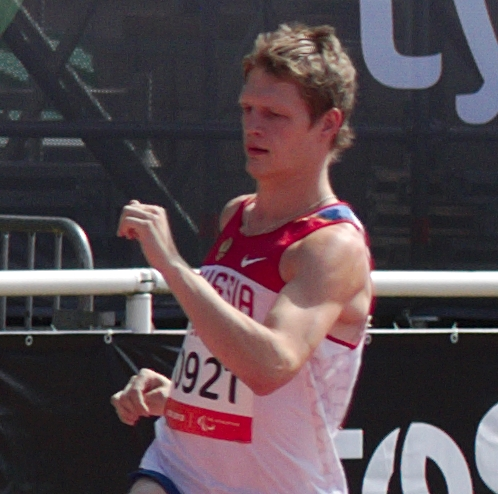
- Shvetsov at the 2013 World Championships

Personal information
- Nationality: Russian
- Born: 28 February 1988 (age 38)

Sport
- Country: Russia
- Sport: Para-athletics
- Disability class: T36
- Event(s): Sprint; Middle distance
Medal record
Event	1st	2nd	3rd
Paralympic Games	3	1	0
World Championships	6	1	0
European Championships	10	0	0
Para-athletics
Paralympic Games
Gold medal – first place	2012 London	100m – T36
Gold medal – first place	2012 London	400m – T36
Gold medal – first place	2012 London	800m – T36
Silver medal – second place	2020 Tokyo	400m – T36
IPC World Championships
Gold medal – first place	2013 Lyon	100m – T36
Gold medal – first place	2013 Lyon	200m – T36
Gold medal – first place	2013 Lyon	400m – T36
Gold medal – first place	2013 Lyon	4 × 100 m – T35–38
Gold medal – first place	2015 Doha	200m – T36
Gold medal – first place	2015 Doha	400m – T36
Silver medal – second place	2019 Dubai	400m – T36
IPC European Championships
Gold medal – first place	2012 Stadskanaal	100m – T36
Gold medal – first place	2012 Stadskanaal	400m – T36
Gold medal – first place	2012 Stadskanaal	800m – T36
Gold medal – first place	2014 Swansea	100m – T36
Gold medal – first place	2014 Swansea	200m – T36
Gold medal – first place	2014 Swansea	400m – T36
Gold medal – first place	2016 Grosseto	400m – T36
Gold medal – first place	2016 Grosseto	800m – T36
Gold medal – first place	2021 Bydgoszcz	100m – T36
Gold medal – first place	2021 Bydgoszcz	400m – T36

Evgeny Valeryevich Shvetsov (Russian: Евгений Валерьевич Швецов; born 28 February 1988) is a Paralympian track and field athlete from Russia competing mainly in category T36 sprint and middle-distance events. A triple gold medal winner at the 2012 Summer Paralympics, Shvetsov set three world records in his class between 2012 and 2013.

== Career history ==
=== 2012 London ===
Shvetsov came to world attention as an athlete at the 2012 Summer Paralympics in London where he entered the 100m and 400m sprints and the 800m middle-distance race. In the 100m he qualified through his heat in first position in a time of 12.11s, a new Paralympic record. In the final he shave three thousands of that record, taking the Paralympic title and pushing Graeme Ballard (Great Britain) and Roman Pavlyk (Ukraine) into silver and bronze positions. There were no qualifier rounds for the 400m T36 event and Shvetcov's results leading into the Games were strong enough to see him in the final. The podium finish of the 400m saw another Britain take silver, Paul Blake and Pavlyk again take bronze, while Shetsov's final time of 53.31s set a new world record giving him the gold medal. For Shetsov's third event of the Paralympic Games, the 800m, he arrived as one of the title favourites, having set a new world record a few months earlier when he ran 2:05.05 at the 2012 European Championships in Stadskanaal. In the Paralympic final he maintained his form to finish just outside his record with a time of 3:05:34 pushing fellow Russian Artem Arefyev into second place.

=== 2013 to 2016 ===
The next year Shvetsov entered the 2013 IPC Athletics World Championships in Lyon as one of the favourites. He failed to disappoint picking up four gold medals, this time all in the sprint events. In contrast to the Paralympics he added the 200m and 4 × 100 m relay to his roster, and showed his class by setting a new world record in the heats of the T36 100m, recording a time of 11.92s, the first time a T36 athlete has run under 12 seconds. He then went on to beat his own world record the next day when he took gold in the final with a time of 11.90 seconds.

Shvetsov added two more international gold medals when he travelled to Swansea in Wales to compete in the 2014 IPC Athletics European Championships. In poor weather conditions he added retained his 100m title from Stadskanaal and added the 200m title. The following year he suffered a rare defeat when he was beaten by Ballard in the 100m at the Berlin Grand Prix. Shvetsov was keen to regain his World Championship titles, and his new training regime focused on the sprint events, including his favourite distance, the 400m.
