= Liu Fuliang =

Chinese Paralympic athlete (born 1985)

Personal information
- Born: 16 November 1985 (age 40) Jiangmen, China
- Height: 183 cm (72 in)

Sport
- Country: China
- Sport: Athletics
- Disability class: T46
- Event(s): sprint, long jump, triple jump
- Club: Guangdong Province
- Coached by: Zeng Huawei
Medal record
Track and field
Representing China
Paralympic Games
Gold medal – first place	2012 London	long jump – T46
Gold medal – first place	2012 London	triple jump – T46
Silver medal – second place	2012 London	100m relay – T42–46
IPC World Championships
Gold medal – first place	2013 Lyon	long jump – T46
Gold medal – first place	2013 Lyon	triple jump – T46
Gold medal – first place	2015 Doha	long jump – T47
Gold medal – first place	2015 Doha	triple jump – T47
Asian Para Games
Gold medal – first place	2014 Incheon	Long jump – T47

Liu Fuliang (born 16 November 1985) is a Paralympian athlete from China competing mainly in T46 classification track and field events.

Liu represented his country at the 2012 Summer Paralympics in London, where he competed in three events, the 100 metre relay and his favoured long jump and triple jump. He finished on the podium in all three events, taking the gold medal in both the jump events and was part of the Chinese relay team that took the silver medal. As well as Paralympic success, Liu dominated both the long jump and triple jump events in the T46/47 classification at the World Championships between the Games in London and Rio. He took the gold medal in both the events in the 2013 World Championships in Lyon, and repeated this feat at the 2015 Championship in Doha.

== Personal history ==
Liu was born in Jiangmen, China in 1985. At the age of eleven he lost his left hand whilst playing with firecrackers. After leaving school he was educated at Jiangmen Sports School.
