= 2013 IPC Athletics World Championships – Men's marathon =

The men's marathon at the 2013 IPC Athletics World Championships was held in the streets of Lyon, France, on 29 July.

== Medalists ==
Class	Gold	Silver	Bronze
T11	Cristian Valenzuela; Chile	Shinya Wada; Japan	Joaquim Machado; Portugal
T12	El Amin Chentouf; Morocco	Elkin Serna; Colombia	Gabriel Macchi; Portugal
T46	Alessandro Di Lello; Italy	Pedro Meza; Mexico	Ezequiel Costa; Brazil
T54	Marcel Hug; Switzerland	Tomasz Hamerlak; Poland	Kota Hokinoue; Japan

== See also ==
- List of IPC world records in athletics
