= Blake Leeper =

American Paralympic sprinter (born 1989)

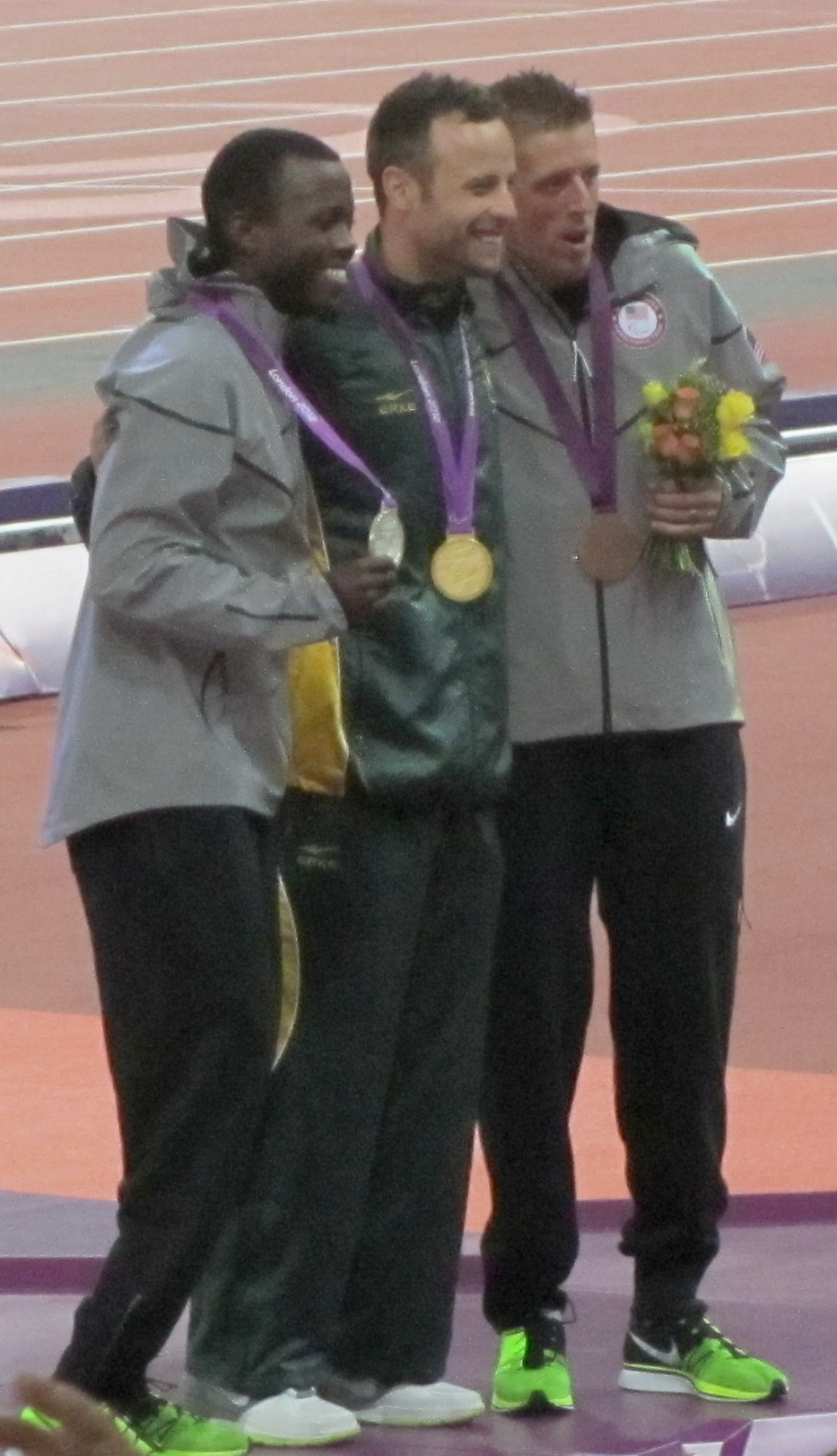
- Leeper (left) at the 2012 Paralympics Men's 400m T44 victory ceremony.

Personal information
- Born: Patrick Blake Leeper; August 31, 1989 (age 37) Kingsport, Tennessee, USA
Medal record
Men's Paralympic athletics
Representing the United States
Paralympic Games
| Silver medal – second place | 2012 London | 400m T43 |
| Bronze medal – third place | 2012 London | 200m T43 |
World Championships
| Gold medal – first place | 2013 Lyon | 4 × 100 m T42–46 |
| Silver medal – second place | 2011 Christchurch | 4 × 100 m T42–46 |
| Silver medal – second place | 2013 Lyon | 100m T43 |
| Silver medal – second place | 2013 Lyon | 200m T43 |
| Silver medal – second place | 2013 Lyon | 400m T43 |
| Silver medal – second place | 2023 Paris | 400m T62 |
Parapan American Games
| Silver medal – second place | 2011 Guadalajara | 100m T44 |

Blake Leeper (born Patrick Blake Leeper, August 31, 1989) is an American Paralympic athlete who specialised in sprint events typically in the T43, T44 and T62 classifications. He is a multiple medalist in both the Paralympics and World Championships. He is also a former world record holder in the 400m and three-time American record holder.

== Early life ==
Patrick Blake Leeper was born in Kingsport, Tennessee with a congenital defect insufficiently formed lower legs ultimately resulting with a double below-the-knee amputation at the age of four.

== Athletics career ==
Leeper made his international debut in 2009 at Rio de Janeiro. In 2011 he won a silver medal in the World Championships 4 × 100 m relay T42–46 classification with a time of 42.84. In the 2012 Paralympic Games, he won an individual silver medal in the 400 meter T44 event and a bronze medal in the 200m T44 event with a time of 22.46.

Leeper served a competition ban from 2015 to 2017 for an anti-doping regulation violation after testing positive for benzoylecgonine, a metabolite of cocaine. It was determined that the use of cocaine was "not intended to enhance performance" which resulted in a reduced sanction period. Although the U.S. Anti-Doping Agency had reduced the initial two year ban to one year due to a settlement agreement, a subsequent ruling confirmed that the International Paralympic Committee had no obligation to recognize the agreement, which it did not. Therefore Leeper was ineligible for Rio 2016.

In July 2016, Leeper set an American record in the 400-metre race with a time of 46.54 seconds.

Leeper returned to competition at the U.S. Track & Field Championships in 2017, becoming the first double-leg amputee to compete at the event. He set a new world record in the 400m T43 classification in a time of 45.25.

Although Leeper was chosen by the US Paralympics to represent Team USA in Rio 2016, he did not participate in the tournament.

Leeper placed fourth in the men's 400m T62 final in a personal best time of 47.32 at the 2024 Summer Paralympics in Paris.

== Prosthetics eligibility in World Athletics ==
In October 2020 Court of Arbitration for Sport dismissed Leeper's appeal to run in major World Athletics events (including the Olympic Games) with his prosthetic legs. He can wear them in other International Competitions although his results will be listed separately and not recognized.
