= Abdellatif Baka =

Algerian Paralympic athlete (born 1994)

Personal information
- Nationality: Algerian
- Born: 7 May 1994 (age 32) El Eulma, Algeria

Sport
- Country: Algeria
- Sport: Athletics
- Disability class: T13
- Club: GSP Alger
Medal record
Men's Paralympic athletics
Representing Algeria
Paralympic Games
Gold medal – first place	2012 London	800 m T13
Gold medal – first place	2016 Rio de Janeiro	1500 m T13
World Championships
Gold medal – first place	2013 Lyon	800 m T13
Gold medal – first place	2013 Lyon	1500 m T13
Silver medal – second place	2015 Doha	800 m T12
Silver medal – second place	2015 Doha	1500 m T12
Bronze medal – third place	2023 Paris	1500 m T13
Bronze medal – third place	2024 Kobe	1500 m T13

Abdellatif Baka (born 7 May 1994) is a visually impaired Algerian middle-distance runner.

== Career ==
Competing in the T13 classification, Baka represented his country at the 2012 Summer Paralympics in London where he won the gold medal in the 800 metres race, and the 2016 Summer Paralympics in Rio de Janeiro, winning the 1500 metres. He won the 1500m in Rio with a record 3'48.29, a faster time than that of the 2016 Summer Olympics 1500m winner, Matthew Centrowitz Jr. The latter's time in the Rio Olympics men's 1500 meters final race was beaten not only by all three medalists in the Rio Paralympics men's 1500 meters race but also by Fouad Baka, who is the brother of Abdellatif Baka and came 4th in that final race. He is also a multiple World Championships winner, taking four medals over two tournaments.

== See also ==
- World and Paralympic records set at the 2016 Summer Paralympics
