= 2015 IPC Athletics World Championships – Men's long jump =

The men's long jump at the 2015 IPC Athletics World Championships was held at the Suheim Bin Hamad Stadium in Doha from 22–31 October.

== Medalists ==
Event	Gold		Silver		Bronze	
T11	Lex Gillette; United States	6.38	Elchin Muradov; Azerbaijan	6.27 PB	Ruslan Katyshev; Ukraine	6.22 PB
T12	Kamil Aliyev; Azerbaijan	7.13 PB	Chen Mingyu; China	7.07 AR	Mohamad Saifuddin Ishak; Malaysia	6.94
T13	Per Jonsson; Sweden	7.15 PB	Iván José Cano Blanco; Spain	6.75	Bekjon Chevarov; Uzbekistan	6.65 AR
T20	Abdul Latif Romly; Malaysia	7.35 CR	Zoran Talic; Croatia	7.32 PB	Dmytro Prudnikov; Ukraine	7.14
T36	Evgenii Torsunov; Russia	5.75 WR	Roman Pavlyk; Ukraine	5.54 PB	Brayden Davidson; Australia	5.44
T37	Shang Guangxu; China	6.47 WR	Ali Olfatnia; Iran	6.18 PB	Andrea Dalle Ave; South Africa	5.77
T38	Hu Jianwen; China	7.13 WR	Dyan Buis; South Africa	6.30 SB	Andrei Poroshin; Russia	6.12 AR
T42	Atsushi Yamamoto; Japan	6.29 CR	Daniel Jorgensen; Denmark	6.02	Regas Woods; United States	5.56
T44	Markus Rehm; Germany	8.40 WR	Ronald Hertog; Netherlands	7.26	Vadim Aleshkin; Russia	6.91
T47	Liu Fuliang; China	7.19 AR	Roderick Townsend-Roberts; United States	7.08	Setiyo Budihartanto; Indonesia	6.95 PB
WR world record | AR area record | CR championship record | GR games record | NR national record | OR Olympic record | PB personal best | SB season best | WL world leading (in a given season)

== See also ==
- List of IPC world records in athletics
