= 2015 IPC Athletics World Championships – Men's 200 metres =

The men's 200 metres at the 2015 IPC Athletics World Championships was held at the Suheim Bin Hamad Stadium in Doha from 22–31 October.

== Medalists ==
Event	Gold		Silver		Bronze	
T11	Felipe Gomes; Guide:Jorge Augusto Pereira Borges; Brazil	22.83	Ananias Shikongo; Guide:Even Tjiviju; Namibia	22.84	Daniel Silva; Guide:Heitor de Oliveira Sales; Brazil	22.91 SB
T12	Leinier Savon Pineda; Cuba	22.14 AR	Jonathan Ntutu; South Africa	22.45 SB	Fedor Trikolich; Russia	22.50 SB
T13	Nambala Johannes; Namibia	21.74 AR	Chad Perris; Australia	21.82 AR	Mateusz Michalski; Poland	21.92 PB
T34	Walid Ktila; Tunisia	27.44 CR	Mohamed Hammadi; United Arab Emirates	27.82	Henry Manni; Finland	28.58
T35	Dmitrii Safronov; Russia	25.07	Artem Kalashian; Russia	25.48	Iurii Tsaruk; Ukraine	25.96
T36	Evgenii Shvetcov; Russia	24.29 WR	Roman Pavlyk; Ukraine	24.63 PB	Evgenii Torsunov; Russia	24.67 PB
T37	Andrey Vdovin; Russia	22.59 WR	Shang Guangxu; China	22.70	Fanie van der Merwe; South Africa	22.99
T38	Hu Jianwen; China	22.22	Dyan Buis; South Africa	22.75	Zhou Wenjun; China	22.94
T42	Richard Whitehead; Great Britain	24.10 =WR	Anton Prokhorov; Russia	24.85	Daniel Jorgensen; Denmark	25.37
T44	Richard Browne; United States	21.27 WR	Alan Oliveira; Brazil	22.04 SB	Hunter Woodhall; United States	22.09 PB
T47	Yohansson Nascimento (T46); Brazil	21.90 PB	Michal Derus (T47); Poland	21.96	Wang Hao (T46); China	22.15
T53	Brent Lakatos; Canada	25.79	Pongsakorn Paeyo; Thailand	26.97	Moatez Jomni; Great Britain	27.03
T54	Kenny van Weeghel; Netherlands	25.14	Saichon Konjen; Thailand	25.42	Alexey Bychenok; Russia	25.64
WR world record | AR area record | CR championship record | GR games record | NR national record | OR Olympic record | PB personal best | SB season best | WL world leading (in a given season)

== See also ==
- List of IPC world records in athletics
