= El Amin Chentouf =

Moroccan Paralympic athlete

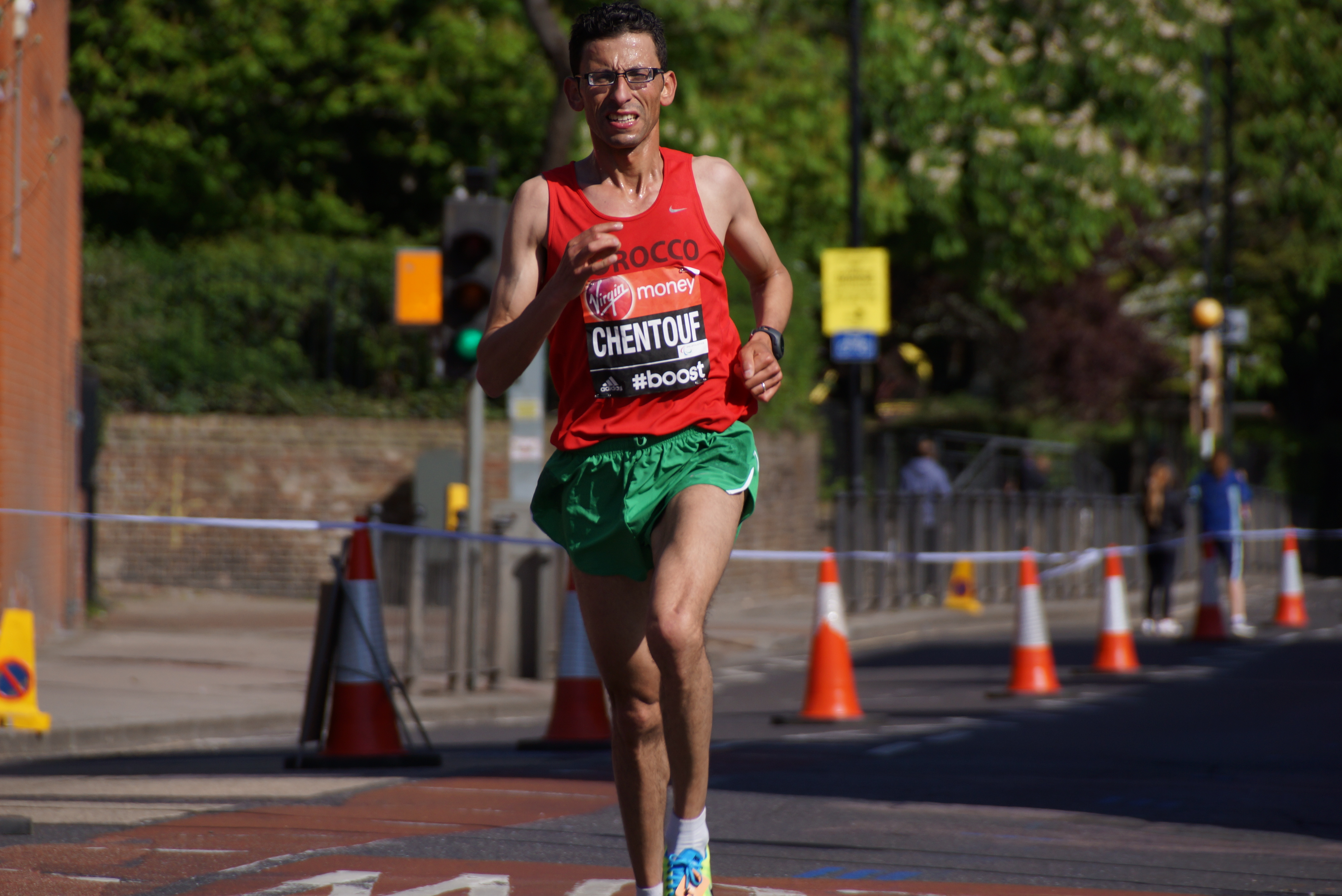
- Chentouf at the 2014 London Marathon

Personal information
- Born: El Amin Chentouf; 8 June 1981 (age 45)
- Height: 176 cm (69 in)

Sport
- Disability: Visual impairment
- Disability class: T12
- Club: Attahadi: Rabat
- Coached by: Moulahhine Mohamed
Medal record
Paralympic athletics
Representing Morocco
Paralympic Games
Gold medal – first place	2012 London	5000m T12
Gold medal – first place	2016 Rio de Janeiro	Marathon T12
Gold medal – first place	2020 Tokyo	Marathon T12
Silver medal – second place	2016 Rio de Janeiro	5000m T12
Bronze medal – third place	2024 Paris	Marathon T12
World Championships
Gold medal – first place	2013 Lyon	Marathon T12
Gold medal – first place	2013 Lyon	1500m T12
Gold medal – first place	2013 Lyon	5000m T12
Bronze medal – third place	2015 Doha	1500m T13

El Amin Chentouf, (Arabic: الأمين شنتوف) (born 9 June 1981) is a Moroccan Paralympic athlete running in T12 distance races. He has represented his country at three Summer Paralympics winning gold medals at each competition. Outside the Paralympics, Chentouf is also a world series Marathon champion, winning the T12/13 event at three London Marathons.

== Personal history ==
Chentouf was born in Morocco in 1981. He is visually impaired.

== Career history ==
Chentouf took up athletics in 2008. He made his senior international debut at the 2012 Summer Paralympics in London. He entered into three events, the 800m and 5,000m at T12 classifications and the 1,500m T13 race. He reached the podium in the 5,000m, taking gold with a world record breaking time of 13:53.76.

The following year he entered the IPC Athletics Marathon World Cup in London, his first competitive international marathon. He won the race in a time of 2:24:00, setting another world record in the T12 class. The same year he represented Morocco at the 2013 IPC Athletics World Championships in Lyon, Chentouf won gold medals in all three of his events, the 1500m, 5000m and the marathon.

Two years later, in the buildup to the 2016 Summer Paralympics in Rio de Janeiro, he took part in the inaugural IPC World Marathon Championships held in London. There he won the men's T11/T12 race with a time of 2:21.33. Later in the year he took part in his second World Championships, this time held in Doha. He failed to dominate the field as he had done so at Lyon, but he did win the bronze in the 1500 metres (T13). In Rio Chentouf cemented his reputation as one of the great distance runners in his class, by winning the men's marathon and taking the silver medal in the 5000 metres.
