= Athletics at the 2016 Summer Paralympics – Men's 400 metres T38 =

Men's 400 metres T38 at the XV Paralympic Games
- Venue: Estádio Olímpico João Havelange
- Dates: 16–17 September 2016
- Competitors: 11 from 8 nations

Medalists
1st place, gold medalist(s)		Dyan Neille Buis	South Africa
2nd place, silver medalist(s)		Jianwen Hu	China
3rd place, bronze medalist(s)		Weiner Javier Diaz Mosquera	Colombia

The T38 category is for ambulant athletes with cerebral palsy. T38 athletes have the mildest form of impairment caused by cerebral palsy, often in only one limb, and not affecting the ability to run, walk or jump freely, although impairing performance. T38 athletes may suffer minor co-ordination difficulties.

The Athletics at the 2016 Summer Paralympics – Men's 400 metres T38 event at the 2016 Paralympic Games took place on 16–17 September 2016, at the Estádio Olímpico João Havelange.

== Heats ==
=== Heat 1 ===
10:00 16 September 2016:

Rank	Lane	Bib	Name	Nationality	Reaction	Time	Notes
1	8	1305	Dixon de Jesus Hooker Velasquez	Colombia		53.89	Q
2	4	1274	Wenjun Zhou	China		54.53	Q
3	6	1245	Jianwen Hu	China		58.37	Q
4	7	1860	Krishna Kumar Hari Das	Malaysia		59.07	
	3	1679	Abbas Al-Darraji	Iraq			DSQ
	5	1059	Evan O'HANLON	Australia			DSQ

=== Heat 2 ===
10:07 16 September 2016:

Rank	Lane	Bib	Name	Nationality	Reaction	Time	Notes
1	6	1304	Weiner Javier Diaz Mosquera	Colombia		52.34	Q
2	7	2078	Dyan Neille Buis	South Africa		54.66	Q
3	4	2273	Mohamed Farhat Chida	Tunisia		55.75	Q
4	3	1272	Huanghao Zhong	China		55.99	q
5	5	1873	Angel Moises Enriquez Torres	Mexico		56.12	q

== Final ==
17:59 17 September 2016:

Rank	Lane	Bib	Name	Nationality	Reaction	Time	Notes
1st place, gold medalist(s)	5	2078	Dyan Neille Buis	South Africa		49.46	
2nd place, silver medalist(s)	7	1245	Jianwen Hu	China		50.27	
3rd place, bronze medalist(s)	4	1304	Weiner Javier Diaz Mosquera	Colombia		51.44	
4	8	2273	Mohamed Farhat Chida	Tunisia		51.49	
5	3	1274	Wenjun Zhou	China		52.43	
6	6	1305	Dixon de Jesus Hooker Velasquez	Colombia		54.80	
7	2	1873	Angel Moises Enriquez Torres	Mexico		54.97	
8	1	1272	Huanghao Zhong	China		55.06	
