= 2015 IPC Athletics World Championships – Men's 800 metres =

The men's 800 metres at the 2015 IPC Athletics World Championships was held at the Suheim Bin Hamad Stadium in Doha from 22 to 31 October.

== Medalists ==
Event	Gold		Silver		Bronze	
T13	Egor Sharov; Russia	1:53.16 CR	Abdellatif Baka; Algeria	1:54.18	Mohamed Amguoun; Morocco	1:54.56 PB
T20	Alexander Rabotnitskiy; Russia	1:53.63 PB	Luis Arturo Paiva; Venezuela	1:53.90 PB	Dmitrii Makarov; Russia	1:57.14 PB
T34	Walid Ktila; Tunisia	1:45.71 CR	Mohamed Hammadi; United Arab Emirates	1:46.01	Henry Manni; Finland	1:46.92
T36	Paul Blake; Great Britain	2:06.89 SB	Artem Arefyev; Russia	2:07.13 SB	Andrey Zhirnv; Russia	2:09.91 PB
T38	Michael McKillop (T37); Ireland	2:01.31 SB	Abbes Saidi (T38); Tunisia	2:02.34 PB	Louis Radius (T38); France	2:05.39 PB
T53	Brent Lakatos; Canada	1:39.61 PB	Li Huzhao; China	1:40.46 PB	Pierre Fairbank; France	1:40.51
T54	Liu Chengming; China	1:35.41 =CR	Kenny van Weeghel; Netherlands	1:35.47	Marcel Hug; Switzerland	1:35.66
WR world record | AR area record | CR championship record | GR games record | NR national record | OR Olympic record | PB personal best | SB season best | WL world leading (in a given season)

== See also ==
- List of IPC world records in athletics
