= Samir Nouioua =

Algerian Paralympic athlete (born 1985)

Personal information
- Nationality: Algerian
- Born: 10 July 1985 (age 41) Tolga, Algeria

Sport
- Country: Algeria
- Sport: Athletics (middle distance)
- Disability class: T46
- Events: 800 metres; 1500 metres; 5000 metres
- Club: GSP Alger

Achievements and titles
- Personal best: 3:51.80 (1500m)
Medal record
Track and field
Representing Algeria
Paralympic Games
Gold medal – first place	2004 Athens	1500m – T46
Gold medal – first place	2004 Athens	5000n – T46
Gold medal – first place	2016 Rio de Janeiro	1500m – T46
Silver medal – second place	2004 Athens	800m – T46
Silver medal – second place	2008 Beijing	800m – T46
Silver medal – second place	2012 London	800m – T46
Bronze medal – third place	2008 Beijing	1500m – T46
Bronze medal – third place	2012 London	1500m – T46
IPC Athletics World Championships
Gold medal – first place	2011 Christchurch	800m – T46
Gold medal – first place	2011 Christchurch	1500m – T46
Gold medal – first place	2013 Lyon	1500m – T46
Gold medal – first place	2013 Lyon	5000m – T46
Gold medal – first place	2015 Doha	1500m – T46
Silver medal – second place	2013 Lyon	800m – T46
Silver medal – second place	2017 London	1500 m T46

Samir Nouioua (born 10 July 1985) is a Paralympian athlete from Algeria competing mainly in category T46 middle-distance events.

He competed in the 2004 Summer Paralympics in Athens, Greece. There he won a gold medal in the men's 1500 metres – T46 event, a gold medal in the men's 5000 metres – T46 event and a silver medal in the men's 800 metres – T46 event. He also competed at the 2008 Summer Paralympics in Beijing, China. There he won a silver medal in the men's 800 metres – T46 event and a bronze medal in the men's 1500 metres – T46 event

== Achievements ==
Year	Competition	Venue	Position	Event	Notes
Representing Algeria
2004	Summer Paralympics	Athens, Greece	2nd	800 m	1:58.71
2004	Summer Paralympics	Athens, Greece	1st	1500 m	3:58.75
2004	Summer Paralympics	Athens, Greece	1st	5000 m	14:54.49
2008	Summer Paralympics	Beijing, China	2nd	800 m	1:52.97
2008	Summer Paralympics	Beijing, China	3rd	1500 m	3:53.46
2011	World Championships	Christchurch, New Zealand	1st	800 m	0:00.00
2011	World Championships	Christchurch, New Zealand	1st	1500 m	0:00.00
2012	Summer Paralympics	London, Great Britain	2nd	800 m	1:52.33 RR
2012	Summer Paralympics	London, Great Britain	3rd	1500 m	3:51.80 PB
2013	World Championships	Lyon, France	2nd	800 m	1:55.43
2013	World Championships	Lyon, France	1st	1500 m	4:05.61
2013	World Championships	Lyon, France	1st	5000 m	15:09.92 PB
2015	World Championships	Doha, Qatar	1st	1500 m	3:53.36 CR
2016	Summer Paralympics	Rio de Janeiro, Brazil	1st	1500 m	3:59.46 SB
