= Cristian Valenzuela (sprinter) =

Chilean Paralympic athlete

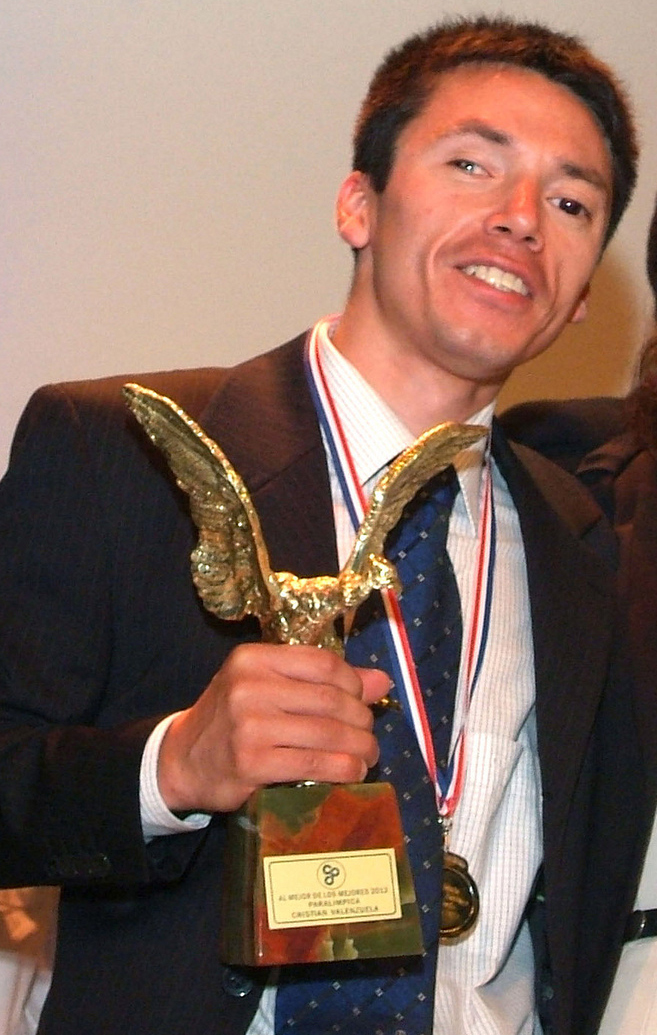

Medal record

Men's Athletics

Representing Chile

Summer Paralympics
Gold medal – first place	2012 London	5000m T11

IPC World Championships
Gold medal – first place	2011 Christchurch	Marathon T11
Gold medal – first place	2013 Lyon	Marathon T11
Gold medal – first place	2015 Doha	5000m T11
Silver medal – second place	2013 Lyon	1500m T11
Silver medal – second place	2013 Lyon	5000m T11
Silver medal – second place	2015 Doha	1500m T11
Silver medal – second place	2017 London	5000m T11

Parapan American Games
Silver medal – second place	2015 Toronto	5000m T11
Bronze medal – third place	2015 Toronto	1500m T11

Cristian Exequiel Valenzuela Guzmán (born 28 April 1983) is a visually impaired Paralympian with congenital glaucoma. He competed for Chile at the 2012 Summer Paralympics. He won his country's first Paralympic medal, gold, in the men's 5,000 metres T11 with a time of 15:26.26. His guide was Cristopher Guajardo.
