= Artem Loginov =

Russian Paralympic sprinter

Personal information
- Nationality: Russian
- Born: 23 June 1991 (age 35) Barnaul, Russia

Sport
- Country: Russia
- Sport: Athletics
- Disability class: T12
- Club: Altai Regional College of Olympic Reserve
- Coached by: Sergey Manuylov
Medal record
Men's Paralympic athletics
Representing Russia
Paralympic Games
Gold medal – first place	2012 London	100m relay T11–13
Bronze medal – third place	2012 London	200 m T13
IPC World Championships
Gold medal – first place	2011 Christchurch	100 m relay T11–13
Gold medal – first place	2013 Lyon	100 m relay T11–13
Silver medal – second place	2013 Lyon	100 m T12
Bronze medal – third place	2013 Lyon	200 m T12
Gold medal – first place	2015 Doha	100 m T11–13
Silver medal – second place	2015 Doha	100 m T12
IPC European Championships
Gold medal – first place	2014 Swansea	100 m relay T11–13
Silver medal – second place	2014 Swansea	100 m T12
Bronze medal – third place	2014 Swansea	200 m T12
Gold medal – first place	2016 Grosseto	100 m relay T11–13
Gold medal – first place	2016 Grosseto	100 m T12
Gold medal – first place	2016 Grosseto	200 m T12

Artem Loginov (born 23 June 1991) is a visually impaired Russian sprinter. Competing in the T12 classification, Loginov competed at the 2012 Summer Paralympics in London, winning a gold and bronze medal. He is also a multiple World and European Championships winner, taking twelve medals over five tournaments.
