= 2013 IPC Athletics World Championships – Women's marathon =

The women's marathon at the 2013 IPC Athletics World Championships was held in the streets of Lyon, France, on 29 July.

== Medalists ==
Class	Gold	Silver	Bronze
T54	Manuela Schaer; Switzerland	Wakako Tsuchida; Japan	Edith Wolf; Switzerland

== See also ==
- List of IPC world records in athletics
