= Alan Oliveira =

Brazilian Paralympic athlete (born 1992)

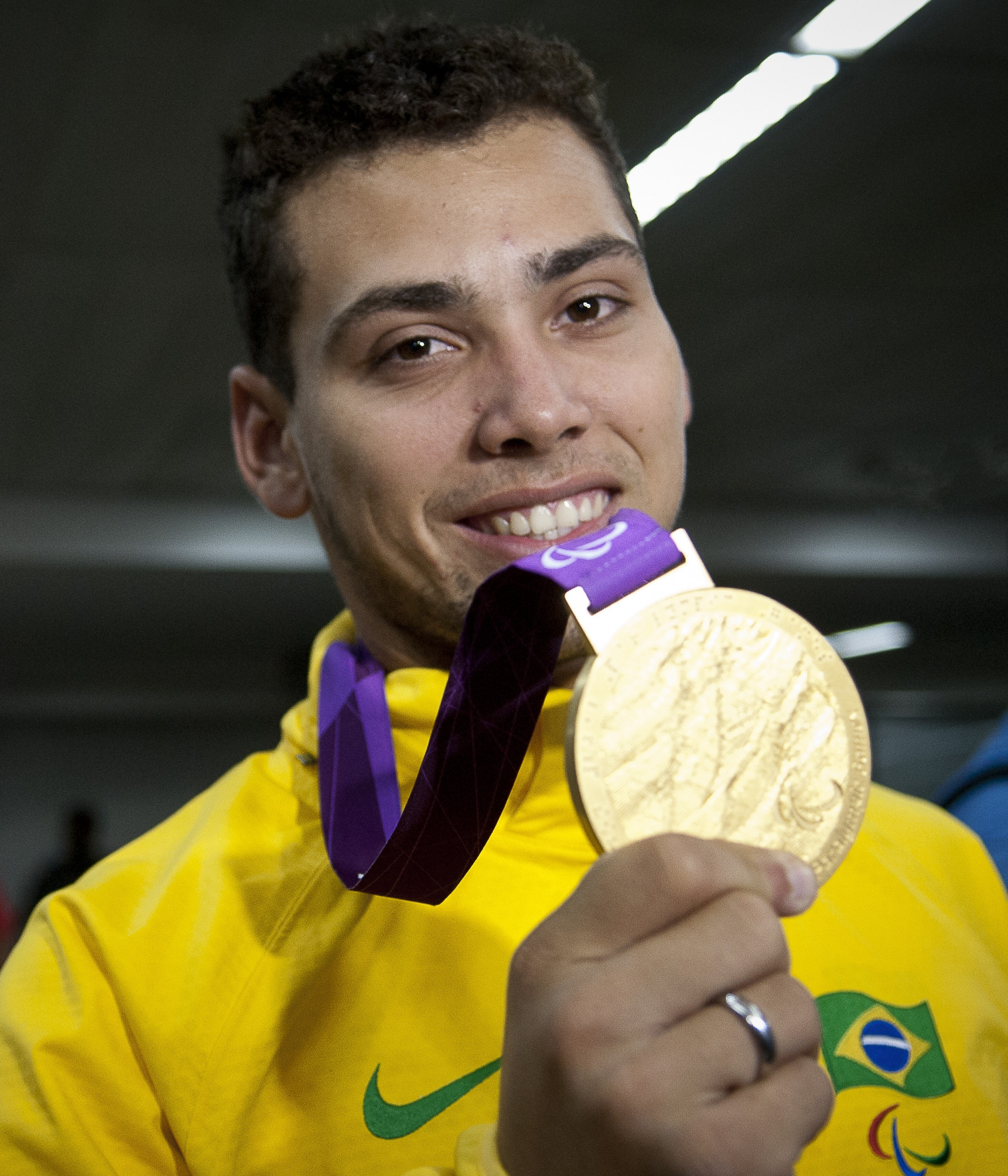
- Oliveira in 2012

Personal information
- Full name: Alan Fonteles Cardoso de Oliveira
- Born: 21 August 1992 (age 33) Marabá, Brazil

Sport
- Disability class: T43
Medal record
Men's para athletics
Representing Brazil
Paralympic Games
Gold medal – first place	2012 London	200 m T44
Silver medal – second place	2008 Beijing	4 × 100 m T42–46
Silver medal – second place	2016 Rio de Janeiro	4 × 100 m – T42–47
IPC World Championships
Gold medal – first place	2013 Lyon	100 m T43
Gold medal – first place	2013 Lyon	200 m T43
Gold medal – first place	2013 Lyon	400 m T44
Silver medal – second place	2013 Lyon	4 × 100 m T42–46
Silver medal – second place	2015 Doha	200 m T44
Bronze medal – third place	2011 Christchurch	100 m T44
Bronze medal – third place	2011 Christchurch	4 × 100 m T42–46
Bronze medal – third place	2015 Doha	100 m T44
Parapan American Games
Silver medal – second place	2011 Guadalajara	200 m T44
Bronze medal – third place	2011 Guadalajara	100 m T44

Alan Fonteles Cardoso de Oliveira (born 21 August 1992) is a Paralympian athlete from Brazil competing mainly in category T44 sprint events. Oliveira is a double-below-the-knee amputee, classifying him in the Paralympic T43 class; athletes in this class run in T44 events.

== Biography ==
Oliveira was born in Marabá, in the state of Pará. He had both legs amputated at the age of 21 days, after an intestinal infection led to sepsis. By the age of eight, he was competing in athletics. Oliveira began running with wooden prostheses, and started competing in races in Brazil at age 13. He began running on carbon-fibre blades at the age of 15, shortly before competing in his first Paralympics in Beijing.

Competing at the 2008 Summer Paralympics in Beijing, Oliveira won a silver medal in the T42–T46 4 × 100 metres relay as part of the Brazilian team, after failing to win a medal in the T44 200m. At the 2012 Summer Paralympics in London he won gold in the T44 200m, ahead of Oscar Pistorius who was a favorite to win. Immediately after the race Pistorius caused controversy by criticising the blades Oliveira had used, claiming they were too long and artificially increased his stride length, giving him an unfair advantage. Pistorius' complaint was denied at that time by the International Paralympic Committee, which stated all athletes were measured prior to the race by a classifier and all blade lengths were approved for competition.

The IPC also confirmed that Pistorius had raised the issue of prosthetic lengths in personal contacts about six weeks prior to the race. SASCOC issued a statement declaring their full support and promising to assist in discussions with the IPC about the issue of blade lengths after the Games. The IPC expressed willingness to discuss the issue. Australian runner Jack Swift and USA runner Jerome Singleton, among other athletes, also expressed support for Pistorius' position regarding a possible competitive advantage.

In July 2013 at the Paralympic Anniversary Games in London Oliveira became world's fastest double amputee athlete when he completed the T43 100m race in a time of 10.57 beating his previous record of 10.77 which he had set in Berlin in June 2013.

At the 2016 Summer Paralympics, held in Rio de Janeiro in his home country of Brazil, Oliveira failed to reach the final of either the 100m or 200m races in the T43 class. He did however win a silver medal in the T42-T47 4 × 100 m relay as part of the Brazil team.

== See also ==
- The Mechanics of Running Blades
