= Lex Gillette =

American Paralympic athlete

Elexis "Lex" Gillette
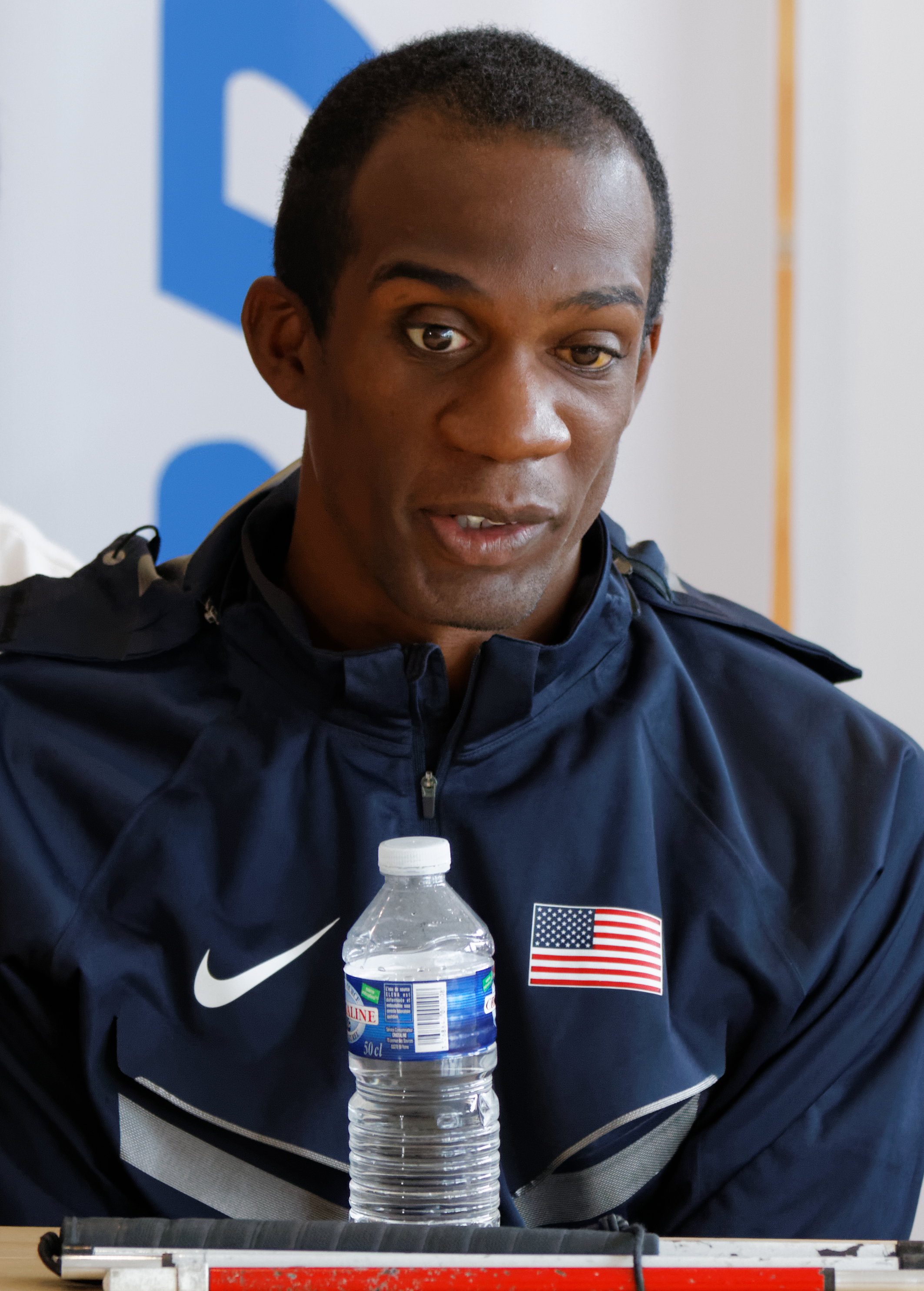
- Lex Gillette at the Paris Paralympic Meeting in 2014

Personal information
- Full name: Elexis LaVelle Gillette
- Nickname: Lex
- Nationality: American
- Born: October 19, 1984 (age 42) Raleigh, North Carolina
Medal record
Track and field (F11)
Representing United States
Paralympic Games
Silver medal – second place	2004 Athens	Long Jump – F11
Silver medal – second place	2008 Beijing	Long Jump – F11
Silver medal – second place	2012 London	Long Jump - F11
Silver medal – second place	2016 Rio de Janeiro	Long Jump - T11
Silver medal – second place	2020 Tokyo	Long Jump - T11
IPC Athletics World Championships
Gold medal – first place	2013 Lyon	Long jump T11
Gold medal – first place	2015 Doha	Long jump T11
Gold medal – first place	2017 London	Long jump - T11
Silver medal – second place	2013 Lyon	Triple jump T11
Silver medal – second place	2013 Lyon	4×100 m relay T11-13
Bronze medal – third place	2011 Christchurch	Triple jump – F11
Parapan American Games
Gold medal – first place	2015 Toronto	Long jump T11/12
Silver medal – second place	2019 Lima	Long jump T11/12
Bronze medal – third place	2007 Rio de Janeiro	Long jump F11-13

Elexis LaVelle "Lex" Gillette (born October 19, 1984) is a blind Paralympic athlete from Raleigh, North Carolina in the United States competing in T11 (track) and F11 (field) events for the United States.

He competed in the 2004 Summer Paralympics in Athens, where he won silver in the men's long jump F11 event. At the 2008 Summer Paralympics in Beijing, he won a silver medal in the men's long jump F11 event and finished fifth in the men's triple jump F11. He competed in 100 m and 200 m T11 events but did not advance to the finals. At the 2012 Summer Paralympics in London, he won a third consecutive silver medal in the men's long jump F11 event and finished fourth in the triple jump event. At the 2016 Summer Paralympics in Rio, he won a fourth consecutive silver medal in the men's Long Jump - T11 event. At the 2020 Summer Paralympics in Tokyo, he won a fifth consecutive silver medal in the men's Long Jump - T11 event.

In 2019, in Dubai, United Arab Emirates, Lex won the gold medal with a jump of 6.45 m during the 2019 World Para Athletics Championships – Men's long jump, marking his fourth world championship. At the 2013 IPC Athletics World Championships in Lyon, France, he won gold in the men's long jump F11 event and he also won silver in the triple jump event. Gillette was a part of the 2013 IPC Athletics World Championships 4 × 100 m relay team that won a silver medal and set a new American record in the process. Gillette broke his own long jump world record for F11 classified athletes of 6.73 m (22 feet 1 inch) with a leap of 6.77 m (22 feet 2 in.) on April 23, 2015, at a high performance meet held at the Chula Vista Olympic Training Center.

== Education ==
Gillette was born on 19 October, 1984 in Raleigh, North Carolina to Verdina Gillette-Simms.

When Gillette was eight, he first noticed his vision was getting blurry. Doctors diagnosed him with retinal detachment shortly after. Gillette had as many as thirteen operations on his eye to solve this issue, but his vision nevertheless slowly deteriorated until he was totally blind.

He attended Athens Drive High School where he started competing in track and field. He graduated from East Carolina University in 2007.

== Music ==
Lex Gillette is also a musician. He plays the piano and enjoys singing. Gillette released a music single on April 16, 2012, that was originally titled Go for Gold and was later changed to On the Stage.

== Beep ball ==
While in high school, Gillette was introduced to beep ball, a modified form of baseball for the visually impaired and blind. In 2003, Gillette was recruited to play with the West Coast Dawgs of the National Beep Baseball Association. His first role with the team consisted mostly of designated hitter duties, but in 2005, Gillette became the starting right fielder for the Dawgs. In 2005 West Coast finished 5th in the World Series that were held in Houston, Texas. 2006 saw the Dawgs play in the championship game where they lost to the Taiwan Home Run. The 2007 World Series of Beep Ball were held in Rochester, Minnesota, and the Dawgs returned to the championship game only to lose to the Kansas All Stars. In 2008, Gillette won his first World Series title with the West Coast Dawgs as they outlasted Kansas for the world title. He was named to the offensive all-star team in the same year. The Dawgs returned to the 2009 World Series title game and repeated as champions against the Taiwan Home Run. In both 2010, and 2011, the West Coast Dawgs played in the World Series title game against the Taiwan Home Run, and both times, Gillette scored the game-winning run to put the Dawgs on top as world champions. ESPN’s E60 featured Gillette and the West Coast Dawgs’ 2011 title run.

== Awards ==
In November 2015, Gillette received the Athletes in Excellence Award from The Foundation for Global Sports Development, in recognition of his community service efforts and work with youth.

=== Lex Gillette Day ===
Mayor David S. Gysberts and Washington County Board of Commissioners Terry Baker proclaimed September 25 Lex Gillette Day in both Hagerstown, Maryland and Washington County, MD.

== Major Accomplishments ==
- 2002: United States Association of Blind Athletes (USABA) Track and Field National Championships Gold Medalist - Long Jump, Colorado Springs, Colorado
- 2004: Paralympic Games Silver Medalist - Long Jump, Athens, Greece
- 2006: Paralympic World Cup Silver Medalist - Long Jump, Manchester, England
- 2006: U.S. Paralympics Track and Field National Championships Gold Medalist - Long Jump, Atlanta, Georgia
- 2006: IPC Athletics World Championships Silver Medalist - Long Jump, Assen, The Netherlands
- 2007: U.S. Paralympics Track and Field National Championships Gold Medalist - Long Jump, Marietta, Georgia
- 2007: Para-Pan American Games Bronze Medalist - Long Jump, Rio de Janeiro, Brazil
- 2008: U.S. Paralympics track and Field National Championships Gold Medalist - Triple Jump, Tempe, Arizona
- 2008: U.S. Paralympics track and Field National Championships Gold Medalist - Long Jump, Tempe, Arizona
- 2008: Paralympic Games Silver Medalist - Long Jump, Beijing, China
- 2010: Athletics Disability Challenge Gold Medalist - Long Jump, Liverpool, England
- 2010: Paralympic World Cup Bronze Medalist - 100m sprint, Manchester, England
- 2010: U.S. Paralympics Track and Field National Championships Gold Medalist - 200m sprint, Miramar, Florida
- 2010: U.S. Paralympics Track and Field National Championships Gold Medalist - 100m sprint, Miramar, Florida
- 2010: U.S. Paralympics Track and Field National Championships Gold Medalist - Triple Jump, Miramar, Florida
- 2010: U.S. Paralympics Track and Field National Championships Gold Medalist - Long Jump, Miramar, Florida
- 2011: IPC Athletics World Championships Bronze Medalist - 200m sprint, Christchurch, New Zealand
- 2011: IPC Athletics World Championships Bronze Medalist - Triple Jump, Christchurch, New Zealand
- 2011: Desert Challenge Games Gold Medalist - 100m sprint, Mesa, Arizona
- 2011: Desert Challenge Games Gold Medalist - Long Jump, Mesa, Arizona
- 2011: U.S. Paralympics Track and Field National Championships Gold Medalist - 200m sprint, Miramar, Florida
- 2011: U.S. Paralympics Track and Field National Championships Gold Medalist - 100m sprint, Miramar, Florida
- 2011: U.S. Paralympics Track and Field National Championships Gold Medalist - Triple Jump, Miramar, Florida
- 2011: U.S. Paralympics Track and Field National Championships Gold Medalist - Long Jump, Miramar, Florida
- 2012: Desert Challenge Games Gold Medalist - Long Jump, Mesa, Arizona
- 2012: Paralympic Games Silver Medalist - Long Jump, London, England
- 2013: U.S. Paralympics Track and Field National Championships Silver medalist - 100m Sprint, San Antonio, Texas
- 2013: U.S. Paralympics Track and Field National Championships Gold Medalist - Triple Jump, San Antonio, Texas
- 2013: U.S. Paralympics Track and Field National Championships Gold Medalist - Long Jump, San Antonio, Texas
- 2013: IPC Athletics World Championships Silver Medalist - 4 × 100 m relay, Lyon, France
- 2013: IPC Athletics World Championships Silver Medalist - Triple Jump, Lyon, France
- 2013: IPC Athletics World Championships Gold Medalist - Long Jump, Lyon, France
- 2014: Desert Challenge Games Gold Medalist - Long Jump, Mesa, Arizona
- 2014: IX Internacional Meeting Kern Pharma, Gran Prix Sauleda Champion - Long Jump, Barcelona, Spain
- 2014: Italian Open Championships Grand Prix Silver Medalist - 100m sprint, Grosseto, Italy
- 2014: Italian Open Championships Grand Prix Gold Medalist - Long Jump, Grosseto, Italy
- 2014: Meeting d’Athlétisme Paralympique de Paris Gold Medalist - Long Jump, Paris, France
- 2014: U.S. Paralympics Track and Field National Championships Gold Medalist - Long Jump, San Mateo, California
- 2014: IPC Athletics Grand Prix Finals Gold Medalist - Long Jump, Birmingham, England
- 2015: Desert Challenge Games Gold Medalist - Long Jump, Tempe, Arizona
- 2016: Paralympic Games Silver Medalist - Long Jump, Rio de Janeiro, Brazil
- 2019: Silver Medalist, Long Jump, Parapan American Games, Lima, Peru
- 2019: IPC Athletics World Championships Gold Medalist - Long Jump, Dubai, United Arab Emirates
- 2021: Paralympic Games Silver Medalist - Long Jump, Tokyo, Japan
