= Dyan Buis =

South African Paralympic athlete

Personal information
- Full name: Dyan Neille Buis
- Born: 30 November 1990 (age 35) Riversdale, Western Cape

Sport
- Country: South Africa
- Sport: sprint runner and long jumper
- Disability class: T38

Achievements and titles
- Personal best: 49.46
Medal record
Track and field (athletics)
Representing South Africa
Paralympic Games
Gold medal – first place	2016 Rio de Janeiro	Men's 400m T38
Silver medal – second place	2012 London	Men's 100m T38
Silver medal – second place	2012 London	Men's 200m T38
Bronze medal – third place	2012 London	Long jump F37-38
IPC World Championships
Silver medal – second place	2013 Lyon	Men's 100m - T38
Silver medal – second place	2013 Lyon	Men's 200m - T38
Silver medal – second place	2015 Doha	Men's 200m - T38
Silver medal – second place	2015 Doha	Men's long jump - T38

Dyan Neille Buis (born 30 November 1990 in Riversdale, Western Cape) is a South African Paralympic sprint runner and long jumper. He has mild cerebral palsy and competes in the T38 class.

In 2012, Buis was a student at Global University in Cape Town, RSA, in Religious and Theological Studies, and trained at Maties Helderberg Disabled Sports Club in Stellenbosch. He competed at the 2012 Paralympic Games, where he won a bronze medal in the men's long jump with a world record time for his class of 6.48 metres. He also won a silver medal in the Men's 100m for his class.

In 2016, at the 2016 Paralympics, Buis ran a 54.66 in the second heat to qualify third for the finals behind Dixon de Jesus Hooker Velasquez and Weiner Javier Diaz Mosquera both from Colombia. In the Finals, Buis set a new personal best of 49.46 seconds and won Gold. The second place went to China's Jianwen Hu and third to Colombia's Weiner Javier Diaz Mosquera.
