= Artyom Arefyev =

Russian Paralympic athlete

Medal record

Track and field (T36)

Representing Russia

Paralympic Games
Gold medal – first place	2004 Athens	400m – T36
Gold medal – first place	2004 Athens	1500m – T36
Gold medal – first place	2008 Beijing	800m – T36
Silver medal – second place	2008 Beijing	400m – T36
Silver medal – second place	2012 London	800m – T36
Silver medal – second place	2015 Doha	800m – T36

IPC World Championships
Gold medal – first place	2011 Christchurch	1500m – T36
Gold medal – first place	2013 Lyon	1500m – T36
Silver medal – second place	2013 Lyon	800m – T36
Silver medal – second place	2015 Doha	800m – T36

IPC European Championships
Silver medal – second place	2016 Grosseto	800m – T36
Bronze medal – third place	2016 Grosseto	400m – T36

Artyom Alexandrovich Arefyev (Артём Александрович Арефьев) (born 17 June 1984) is a Paralympian athlete from Russia competing mainly in category T36 sprint events.

He competed in the 2004 Summer Paralympics in Athens, Greece. There he won a gold medal in the men's 400 metres – T36 event, and a gold medal in the men's 1500 metres – T36 event. He also competed at the 2008 Summer Paralympics in Beijing, China. There he won a gold medal in the men's 800 metres – T36 event, and a silver medal in the men's 400 metres – T36 event.
