= Pavel Kharagezov =

Russian Paralympic athlete

Medal record

Track and field (T36)

Representing Russia

Paralympic Games
Bronze medal – third place	2008 Beijing	800m - T36

Pavel Kharagezov is a Paralympian athlete from Russia competing mainly in category T36 middle-distance events.

He competed in the 2008 Summer Paralympics in Beijing, China. There he won a bronze medal in the men's 800 metres - T36 event and finished fourth in the men's 400 metres - T36 event
