= 2013 IPC Athletics World Championships =

Paralympic track and field event

6th IPC Athletics World Championships
- Host city: Lyon, France
- Nations: 94
- Athletes: 1,073
- Dates: 20 – 28 July
- Main venue: Stade du Rhône

The 2013 IPC Athletics World Championships was the biggest track and field competition for athletes with a disability since the 2012 Summer Paralympics. It was held in Lyon, France, and lasted from 20 to 28 July. Around 1,100 athletes competed, from 94 different countries. The event was held in the Stade du Rhône located at the Parc de Parilly in Vénissieux, in Lyon Metropolis.

== Venue ==

The Championship was staged at the Stade du Rhône in the Parc de Parilly. The stadium, previously known as the Stade Parilly, was refurbished in 2012 and officially reopened and renamed on 3 September 2012.

== Format ==
The 2013 IPC Athletics World Championships was an invitational tournament taking in track and field events. No combined sports were included in the 2013 Championships, with the pentathlon dropped. A total of 1,300 places were made available to all IPC affiliated countries, with 94 countries accepting the invitation and 1,073 athletes reaching the sporting criteria requested. Of the 1,300 available places, 900 were made available for male athletes and 400 for female athlete. No country could send more than 55 male athletes and 25 female athletes, and only three athletes per event, apart from the marathons where six were allowed, or multi-classification events (such as F54/55/56 javelin) where five athletes could be entered. All events, apart from the marathons, took place within the Stade du Rhône. Not all events were open to all classifications, with several throwing and jumping events being contested between classifications, which were then decided on a points system. The men's 100m relay was the only event to use mixed classifications as a team, with each leg of the relay contested by a different classification athlete. There were no women's relay events. In total there were 207 events held over 17 disciplines.

Athletes finishing in first place are awarded the gold medal, second place the silver medal and third place the bronze. If only three competitors are available to challenge for an event then no bronze medal is awarded.

== Coverage ==
The International Paralympic Committee provided live video coverage on its website, as well as live coverage, videos of events and interviews on its ParalympicSportTV channel on YouTube.

In the host country, France, the television channel France 4 broadcast two hours daily in the evening. This followed criticism that French television had given insufficient coverage to the 2012 Summer Paralympics.

In the United Kingdom, Channel 4's sister channel More4 aired over five hours of live coverage daily throughout the Championship. This continued Channel 4's commitment to broadcasting disability sport until at least 2016.

== Events ==
=== Opening ceremony ===
The opening ceremony was held at Stade du Rhone on Friday 19 July. The spectators were entertained by a celebration of Lyon's cultural heritage with an historic re-enactment, followed by a parade of athletes representing the 90 participating nations filed into the stadium.

Speeches were made by Gérard Masson, President of the Organisation Committee and Sir Philip Craven, IPC President. Before the host nation national anthem played, master corporal Thomas Brun, a wounded veteran of the Afghanistan war, passed on the Tricolour to French athletes of the 2014 Winter Paralympics.

=== Classification ===
To ensure competition is as fair and balanced as possible, athletes are classified dependent on how their disability impacts on their chosen event/s. Thus athletes may compete in an event against competitors with a different disability to themselves. Where there are more than one classification in one event, (for example discus throw F54/55/56), a points system is used to determine the winner.

- F = field athletes
- T = track athletes
- 11-13 – visually impaired, 11 and 12 compete with a sighted guide
- 20 – intellectual disability
- 31-38 – cerebral palsy or other conditions that affect muscle co-ordination and control. Athletes in class 31-34 compete in a seated position; athletes in class 35-38 compete standing.
- 41-46 – amputation, les autres
- 51-58 – wheelchair athletes

=== Schedule ===
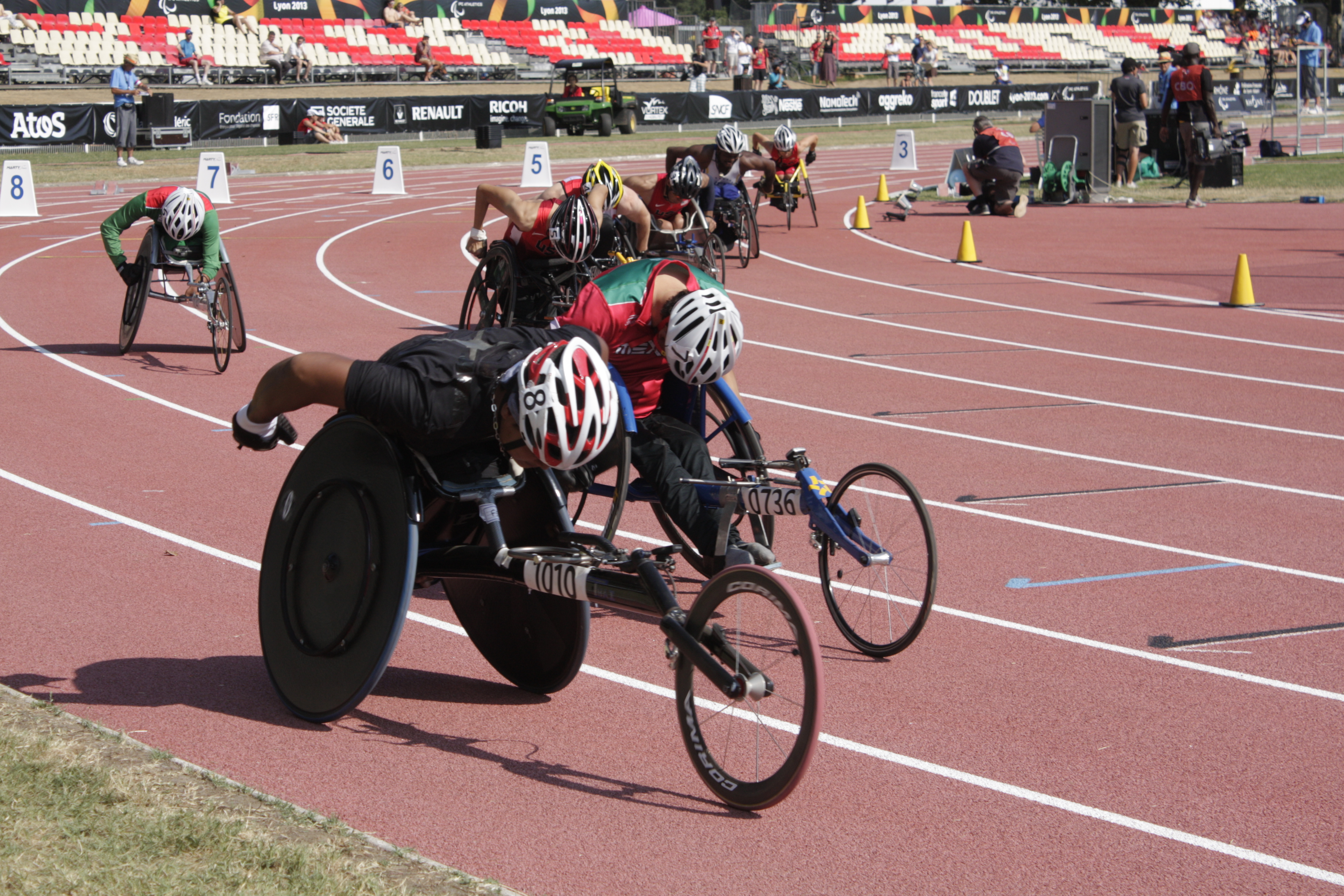
The final of the men's T52 200m sprint.

●	Opening ceremony	Events	●	Closing ceremony

Date →		19	20	21	22	23	24	25	26	27	28
100 m	Men; Details				T37; T36; T38; T51	T35; T43; T44; T52	T34; T46	T12; T13	T53; T54; T11; T42		
100 m	Women; Details				T34; T35	T11	T38; T12; T13; T37	T53; T54; T44	T52	T42; T36; T46	
200 m	Men; Details			T11; T12; T13; T43; T44	T46; T34	T42	T36; T37; T38; T53; T54	T51; T52		T35	
200 m	Women; Details		T34	T53; T54; T12	T37; T38	T36		T46	T13	T11; T35; T44; T52	
400 m	Men; Details			T53; T54					T36; T37; T38; T46; T44	T11; T12; T13; T34; T52	
400 m	Women; Details				T46			T11		T37; T53; T54; T13	
800 m	Men; Details			T37; T52	T13; T36; T46; T12; T53; T54	T11		T34			
800 m	Women; Details			T11		T53; T54	T52				
1500 m	Men; Details		T52				T36; T38	T20; T46; T11; T12; T13	T54		
1500 m	Women; Details							T54		T12; T20	
5000 m	Men; Details		T11; T12; T46				T54				
5000 m	Women; Details			T54							
10,000 m	Men; Details		T54			T12					
Marathon	Men; Details										T11; T12; T46; T54
Marathon	Women; Details										T54
4 × 100 m relay	Men; Details					T11-13				T42-46; T35-38	
4 × 400 m relay	Men; Details									T53/54	
Long jump	Men; Details		T36; T37/38; T46	T13; T42		T20	T44		T12	T11	
Long jump	Women; Details			T11	T20; T42	T46; T44		T13; T12	T37/38		
Triple jump	Men; Details						T11		T46	T12	
High jump	Men; Details		T42/44						T13		
Shot put	Men; Details		F12; F42	F41	F20	F52/53; F46	F32/33	F58; F35; F11; F34	F36; F56/57; F37	F44; F38	
Shot put	Women; Details		F58	F55/56/57; F35/36	F37; F54		F42/44; F11		F32/33/34; F20	F12; F52/53	
Discus throw	Men; Details		F11	F37/38; F54/55/56; F44	F51/52/53; F35/36; F57/58	F42	F12		F41	F32/33/34; F46	
Discus throw	Women; Details		F11/12	F51/52/53		F54/55/56		F41; F35/36	F37	F57/58	
Javelin throw	Men; Details		F57/58; F33/34	F46	F41	F37/38; F11	F54/55/56; F44	F42	F12/13; F52/53		
Javelin throw	Women; Details				F46	F52/53; F33/34	F57/58	F12/13; F54/55/56			
Club throw	Men; Details							F31/32/51			
Club throw	Women; Details						F31/32/51				
Ceremonies		●									●

=== Results ===
Full results

== Medal table ==
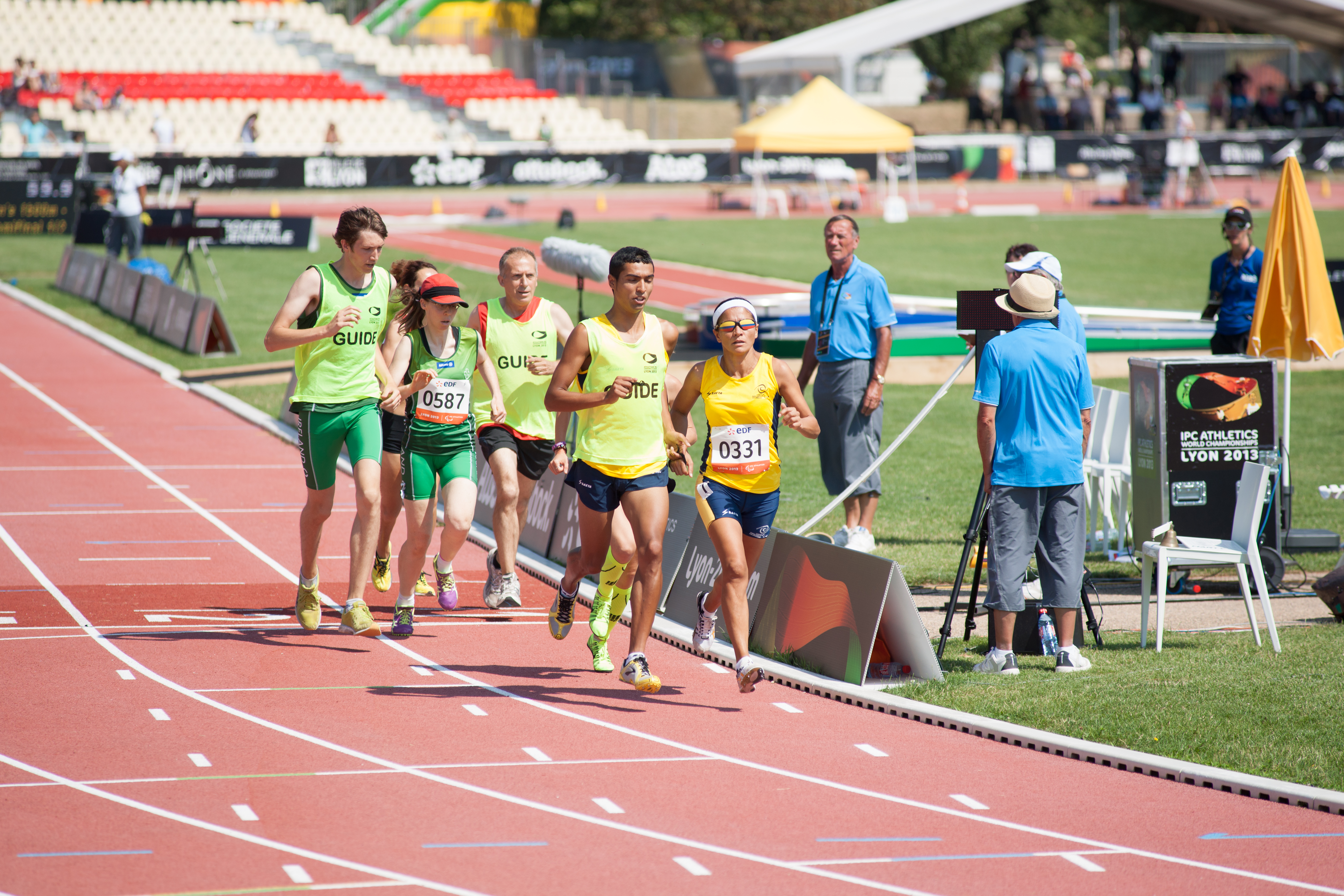
Colombia's Maritza Arango Buitrago (0331) leads Ireland's Amanda Crotty (0587) in the semi-final of the T12 1500m.

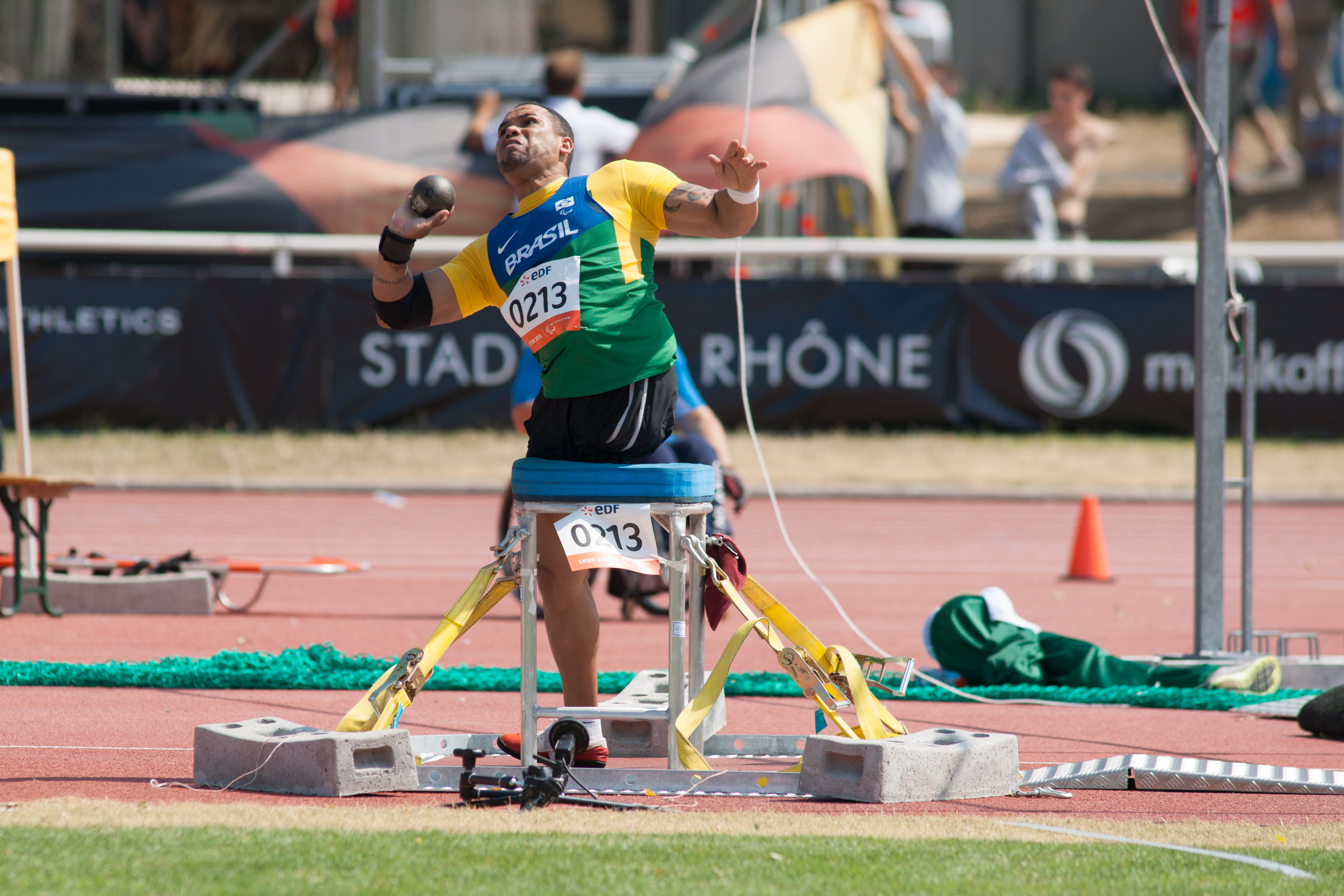
Claudiney Batista dos Santos of Brazil in the T56/57 shot put

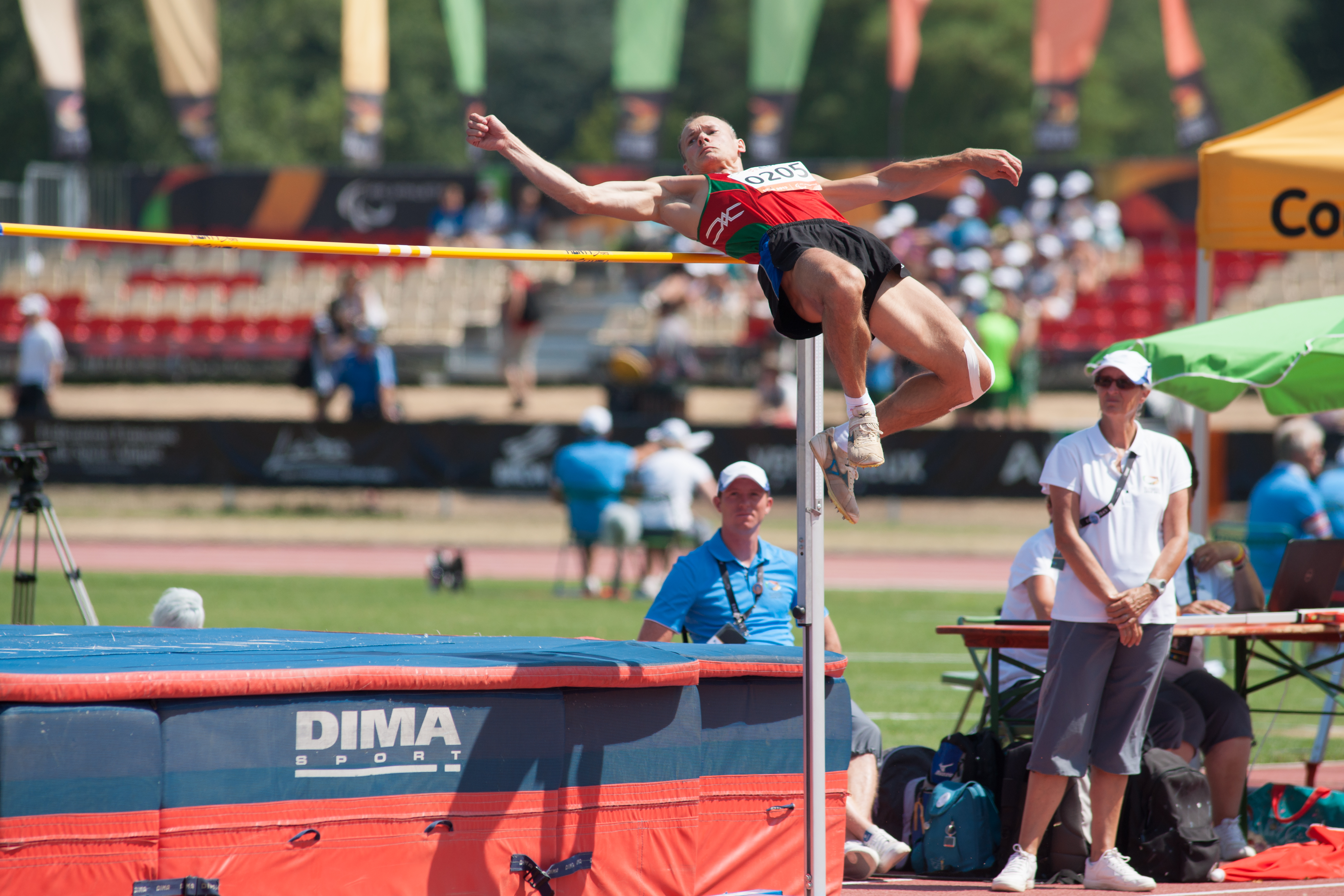
Ihar Fartunau of Belarus in the T13 high jump

The medal table at the end of Day 9 (28 July).

* Host nation (France)

Rank	Nation	Gold	Silver	Bronze	Total
1	Russia (RUS)	26	16	11	53
2	United States (USA)	17	18	17	52
3	Brazil (BRA)	16	10	14	40
4	Ukraine (UKR)	13	9	8	30
5	Great Britain (GBR)	11	9	9	29
6	China (CHN)	10	13	4	27
7	Germany (GER)	10	9	9	28
8	Poland (POL)	10	8	8	26
9	Algeria (ALG)	10	8	5	23
10	Tunisia (TUN)	8	6	1	15
11	Canada (CAN)	7	5	3	15
12	Italy (ITA)	7	0	2	9
13	Switzerland (SUI)	6	5	3	14
14	Cuba (CUB)	5	1	2	8
15	Australia (AUS)	4	11	15	30
16	Mexico (MEX)	4	4	2	10
17	Morocco (MAR)	4	3	3	10
17	Netherlands (NED)	4	3	3	10
19	Ireland (IRL)	4	1	0	5
20	South Africa (SAF)	3	9	6	18
21	France (FRA)*	3	4	7	14
22	Iran (IRN)	3	2	3	8
23	Spain (ESP)	3	0	6	9
24	Finland (FIN)	2	5	2	9
25	South Korea (KOR)	2	1	1	4
26	Japan (JPN)	1	5	4	10
27	Austria (AUT)	1	3	2	6
28	Namibia (NAM)	1	2	3	6
29	Belarus (BLR)	1	2	2	5
30	Azerbaijan (AZE)	1	2	1	4
31	Chile (CHI)	1	2	0	3
32	Chinese Taipei (TPE)	1	1	1	3
32	Latvia (LAT)	1	1	1	3
32	Venezuela (VEN)	1	1	1	3
35	Jamaica (JAM)	1	1	0	2
36	Denmark (DEN)	1	0	0	1
36	Iceland (ISL)	1	0	0	1
36	India (IND)	1	0	0	1
36	Malaysia (MAS)	1	0	0	1
36	Rwanda (RWA)	1	0	0	1
36	Syria (SYR)	1	0	0	1
42	Greece (GRE)	0	4	5	9
43	Colombia (COL)	0	3	2	5
44	Croatia (CRO)	0	2	5	7
45	Thailand (THA)	0	2	2	4
46	Lithuania (LTU)	0	2	0	2
47	Czech Republic (CZE)	0	1	4	5
48	Bulgaria (BUL)	0	1	3	4
49	Argentina (ARG)	0	1	2	3
49	Slovakia (SVK)	0	1	2	3
51	Angola (ANG)	0	1	1	2
51	Sweden (SWE)	0	1	1	2
51	United Arab Emirates (UAE)	0	1	1	2
54	Cape Verde (CPV)	0	1	0	1
54	Jordan (JOR)	0	1	0	1
54	New Zealand (NZL)	0	1	0	1
54	Serbia (SRB)	0	1	0	1
54	Uzbekistan (UZB)	0	1	0	1
59	Portugal (POR)	0	0	5	5
60	Egypt (EGY)	0	0	3	3
61	Turkey (TUR)	0	0	2	2
62	Bosnia and Herzegovina (BIH)	0	0	1	1
62	Commonwealth Games Federation (CGF)	0	0	1	1
62	Hungary (HUN)	0	0	1	1
62	Norway (NOR)	0	0	1	1
62	Saudi Arabia (KSA)	0	0	1	1
62	Sri Lanka (SRI)	0	0	1	1
Totals (67 entries)		208	205	203	616

== Multiple medallists ==
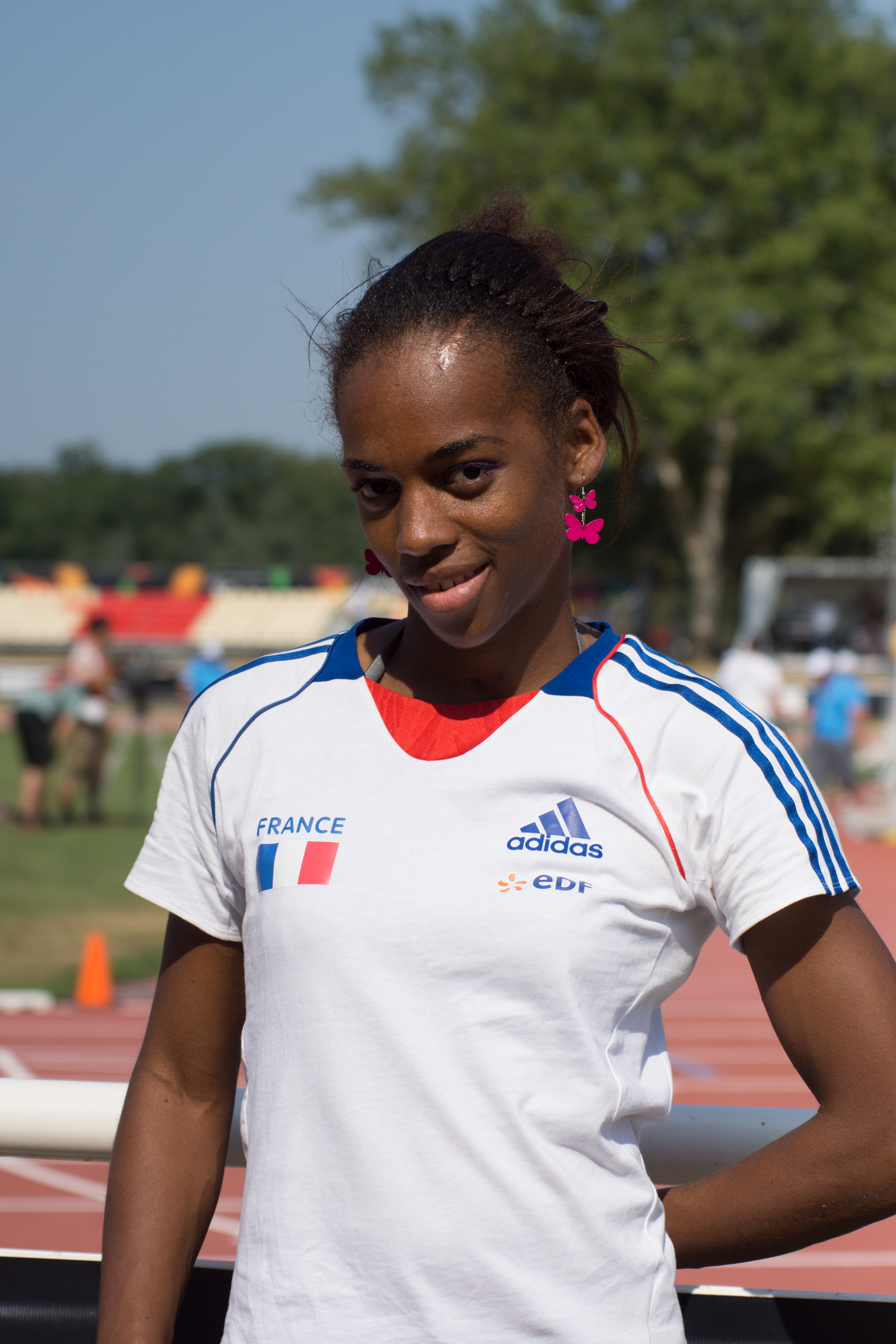
Multiple medallist Mandy François-Elie was France's most successful athlete of the Championships, winning gold in both the 100m and 200m T37 sprints.

161 competitors won multiple medals at the 2013 Championships. The following six athletes won four gold medals or more.

Name	Country	Medal	Event
Tatyana McFadden	United States	Gold; Gold; Gold; Gold; Gold; Gold	100 metres - T54; 200 metres - T54; 400 metres - T54; 800 metres - T54; 1,500 metres - T54; 5,000 metres - T54
Marcel Hug	Switzerland	Gold; Gold; Gold; Gold; Gold; Silver	400 metres - T54; 1,500 metres - T54; 5,000 metres - T54; 10,000 metres - T54; Marathon - T54; 800 metres - T54
Raymond Martin	United States	Gold; Gold; Gold; Gold; Gold	100 metres - T52; 200 metres - T52; 400 metres - T52; 800 metres - T52; 1,500 - T52
Brent Lakatos	Canada	Gold; Gold; Gold; Gold; Silver	100 metres - T53; 200 metres - T53; 400 metres - T53; 4 × 400 m relay - T53/54; 800 metres - T53
Walid Ktila	Tunisia	Gold; Gold; Gold; Gold	100 metres - T34; 200 metres - T34; 400 metres - T34; 800 metres - T34
Evgenii Shvetcov	Russia	Gold; Gold; Gold; Gold	100 metres - T36; 200 metres - T36; 400 metres - T36; 4 × 100 m relay - T35-38

== Highlights ==
=== Day 1 (20 July) ===
After failing to show up at the final of the T11 5,000m at the 2012 Summer Paralympics, Brazil's Odair Santos took the world title, beating fellow South American and Paralympic champion Cristian Valenzuela by over 11 seconds. In the T12 class of the 5,000m, Morocco's El Amin Chentouf set a competition record of 14:32.27. The Ukraine team started the games strongly with three gold medals, Andrii Holivets in the F12 shot put, Andriy Onufriyenko in the T37/38 long jump and Roman Pavlyk who broke the T36 long jump world record with a distance of 5.44m. Maciej Lepiato won the first gold of the Championships for Poland when he broke his own world record in the T44 high jump with a height of 2.13m. Other world records fell in the throwing events when Mohsen Kaedi (Iran) took the F34/35 Javelin while Aled Davies (Great Britain) won the F42 shot put.

Marcel Hug of Switzerland started a strong personal Championship with his first medal of the tournament, the 10,000m gold in the T54 classification, his third consecutive World medal at this distance. Although the team failed to take a gold medal on day one, the USA showed strength in the qualifiers with Tatyana McFadden winning both her T54 heats, setting a personal best in the 200m and a championship record in 5000m. Fellow countryman Jarryd Wallace set a world record of 22.32 in the T44 200m sprint qualifier. Liu Fuliang of China, who took gold in the T46 triple jump and silver in the T42-46 4 × 100 m relay in the London Paralympics, showed his versatility by winning the T46 long jump. Another Paralympic winner to take gold in Lyon was Britain's Hannah Cockroft who won the T34 200m sprint.

=== Day 2 (21 July) ===
On day two the USA converted their strong qualifying results into medals, taking five golds. Two from Tatyana McFadden, in the T54 200m and 5000m, Jeremy Campbell in the F44 discus, Raymond Martin with a Championship record in the T52 800m and Jarryd Wallace who beat his world record, set the day before, by running 22.08 in the T44 200m. Luis Felipe Gutiérrez won the first gold of the Championship for Cuba taking the T13 long jump, while his compatriot Leonardo Diaz doubled their tally with a world record in F54/55/56 discus throw. Japan's Atsushi Yamamoto gave his country their first top podium finish, in the T42 long jump.

The Ukraine continued their first day success by collecting three more golds, including two wins in the throwing disciplines, Mykola Zhabnyak in the F37/38 discus and Mariia Pomazan in the F35/36, who set a new World record with a distance of 12.35m. The Ukraine's trio of gold medals was completed by Oxana Boturchuk in the T12 200m sprint. Poland saw double success, with golds from Bartosz Tyszkowski in the F41 shot put and Mateusz Michalski on the track, where he set a Championship record in the T12 200ms.

World records were set in the F51/52/53 women's discus throw, set by Britain's Josie Pearson, and in the T37 800m race Michael McKillop of the Republic of Ireland who added the world title to his Paralympic gold. Ireland added to this success when Jason Smyth equaled his own world record in the T13 200m final. World records also fell in the qualifying rounds, with the host nation's own Mandy Francois-Elie recording a time of 28.35s in the T37 200m semi-final. Tunisia's Walid Ktila qualified for the final of the T34 200m with a record time of 27.61s. One of the most significant wins of the day came late in the schedule when Brazil's parasport poster-boy Alan Oliveira secured the T43 200m title by running a world record time of 20.66s.

=== Day 3 (22 July) ===
Host nation France secured their first gold medal of the Championships when Mandy Francois-Elie won the T37 200m final. Further success from Russia pushes the country into second place on the medal table, with gold medals for five athletes. Of the five gold medal winning athletes, four broke the world record in their discipline: Andrey Vdovin, (100m T37), Evgenii Shvetcov (100m T36), Maria Bogacheva (shot put F54) and Egor Sharov (800m T12). Their fifth winning athlete was Alexey Ashapatov who set a Championship record of 58.39m in the F57/58 discus. Germany also saw one of its athletes break a world record as Sebastian Dietz took the F35/36 in the men's discus.

Algeria continued to build on the achievements set by Samir Nouioua on the first day, with two gold medals in the men's events, Abdellatif Baka in the T13 800m and a world record for Mohamed Berrahal in the F51/52/53 discus. In the two long jump finals of the day Karolina Kucharczyk of Poland recorded a World record of 6.09m in the T20 while Martina Caironi of Italy took the title in the women's T42. Italy added a third gold on day 3 when Oxana Corso won the 100m T35 with a world record time. Muhammad Ziyad Zolkefli gave Malaysia their first medal of the competition with a gold in the F20 shot put. Finland also added to their tally with a gold in the T51 100m sprint from Toni Piispanen and a silver from Henry Manni in the T34 200m, high returns from a small but competitive team.

2016 Summer Paralympics host nation Brazil continued to impress with two more track golds, one from Verônica Hipólito in a hotly contested T38 200m final, and the second by Yohansson Nascimento in the T46 200m. The previous Paralympic host's Great Britain also kept up their challenge for the top of the medal table with Hannah Cockroft taking her second gold with victory in the T34 100m, Hollie Arnold winning the F46 javelin and Paul Blake achieving gold success in the T36 800m final. In the T44 100m qualifiers, world record holder Jonnie Peacock of Britain qualified for the finals with a season's best only to see American rival Richard Browne beat his world record by 0.02 seconds to set up an exciting day 4 showdown.

=== Day 4 (23 July) ===
In the shot put, Aigars Apinis of Latvia equaled the world record in the F43/43 classification, while Nikita Prokhorov took a centimeter off his own world record in the F46 class. Germany had further success in the throwing events with gold for Marianne Buggenhagen in the F54/55/56 discus and Birgit Kober in the F33/34 javelin. Other notable wins went to Aled Davies (Britain) in the F42 discus, Anibal Bello who won Venezuela's first gold of the Championship in the F11 javelin and Estela Salas in the F52/53 javelin, a second win for Mexico.

In the jumping events, Iris Pruysen of the Netherlands won the T44 long jump, her country's first in Lyon, Nikol Rodomakina (Russia) recorded a personal best to win the T46 long jump and another gold went to the Ukraine as Dmytro Prudinkov took the T20 long jump title.

On the track, Russia took the first team event when they won the Men's 4 × 100 m Relay in the T11-13 class, pushing the USA and France into second and third place. The USA were not without success on day four, with Tatyana McFadden securing her third out of a possible six gold medals with a world record time of 1.44:44 in T54 800m final. This was followed by a win by Raymond Martin in the T52 100m sprint. The highly anticipated contest between Peacock and Browne in the T44 final went to Peacock who took the gold with just 0.02seconds between the rivals. The contest was not so close between Oliveira and his American rival Blake Leeper, with the Brazilian winning his second gold of the Championship in style in the T43 100m. There were more gold medals for Brazil on the track, for Odair Santos in the T11 800m and Terezinha Guilhermina in the T11 100m. Other wins went to Min Jae Jeon of South Korea in the T36 200m and China's Zhou Hongzhuan added to her Beijing and London success with the T53 800m title.

=== Day 5 (24 July) ===
Russia continued their steady accumulation of podium wins with success on the track. Evgenii Shvetcov won the T36 200m and Andrey Vdovin broke the world record in the T37 200m. Not to be outdone, teammate Atrem Arefyev also broke a world record, in the 1500m in the T36 classification. Other track success was claimed by Australia's Evan O'Hanlon, whose gold in the T38 200m sprint was his second of the competition. O'Hanlon's two wins, Australia's only top podium success of the Championships so far, hide a team heavy in medal success but unable to convert silver and bronze to gold.

France broke into the top twenty of the medal table with three podium finishes, two of them gold. Mandy Francois-Elie who secured her second win of the Championship with the T37 100m title was joined by Tony Falelavaki who threw 54.39m in the F44 Javelin. Other multiple medal winners included Marcel Hug (Switzerland), whose domination of the T54 distance racing continued as he added the 5000m title to his 400 and 10,000m golds. Ireland's Michael McKillop collected his second gold by setting a championship record in the T38 1500m, while Walid Ktila of Tunisia won the T34 100m, the second of a possible four medals in his sights. Another athlete aiming at four medals was T53 wheelchair racer Brent Lakatos of Canada, who, with a silver already in the 800m and a gold in the 400m, took the 200m title with a championship record time.

World records continued to be broken, with Markus Rehm of Germany setting a distance of 7.95m in the T44 men's long jump. In the T38 100m, 16-year-old British sprinter Sophie Hahn gained revenge over her rival Verônica Hipólito, who had beaten her in the 200m, by posting a record time of 13.10s. Two world records were also set in the women's throwing events, in the club throw Maroua Ibrahmi recorded a distance of 24.15 on her way to a points victory, while Assunta Legnente out threw her nearest rival by a massive five metres to win the T11 shot put for Italy.

=== Day 6 (25 July) ===
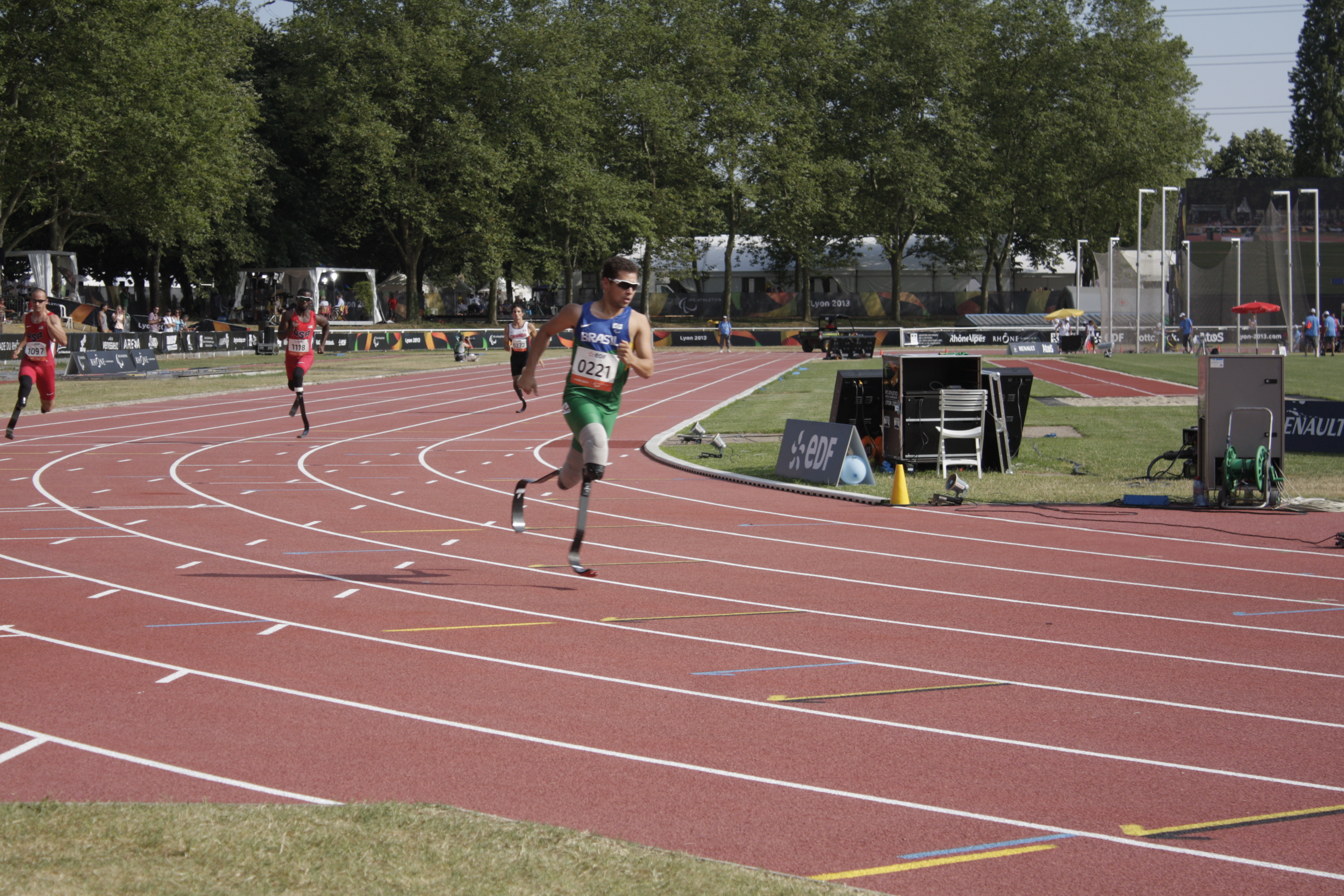
Alan Oliveira leads in the T44 400 m qualifiers on Day 6 of the Championships.

Day 6 started with Michelle Stilwell of Canada collecting her country's third gold of the games with a world record time of 2:14.79 in the T52 800 metres. Iran brought their medal tally up to six when Peyman Nasiri Bazanjani won his country's first track medal of the championships with victory in the T20 1500 m race. Algeria collected two gold medals on the track, both at 1500 m distance, Samir Nouioua in the T46 classification and Abdellatif Baka in the T13. These wins gave Nouioua and Baka their second gold medals of the competition. This was bettered by Odair Santos who won his third gold of the games when he secured the T12 1500 m, though the Brazilian could not compete with Tatyana McFadden who successfully claimed her fourth and fifth golds of the games when she won the T54 100 m and 1500 m. In the T54 1500m race, despite the distance of the race, Japan's Wakako Tsuchida and Switzerland's Edith Wolf crossed the finish line in a rare dead-heat and were both awarded the silver medal. Other multiple gold medal winners on the track included a third for Tunisia's Walid Ktila (T34 800 m), a second for China's Huang Lisha (T53 100 m) and a second for Ireland's Jason Smyth (T13 100 m).

In the throwing events, four new world records were set. Hania Aidi of Tunisia recorded a distance of 18.32 m in the F54/55/56 javelin. Lahouari Bahlaz of Algeria secured gold with a record in the men's F31/32/51 club throw, while Ukrainian Mariia Pomazan threw 31.42 m in the F35/36 discus throw. Fifteen-year-old British athlete Scott Jones beat his closest rival by 59 cm in the F34 shot put to set the last world record of the day.

Both jumping events held on day six were in the women's long jump. Isle Hayes from South Africa set a championship record of 5.76 m to win the T13. Another championship record fell in the T12 classification of the long jump when Oksana Zubkovska of the Ukraine recorded a distance of 6.51 m.

=== Day 7 (26 June) ===
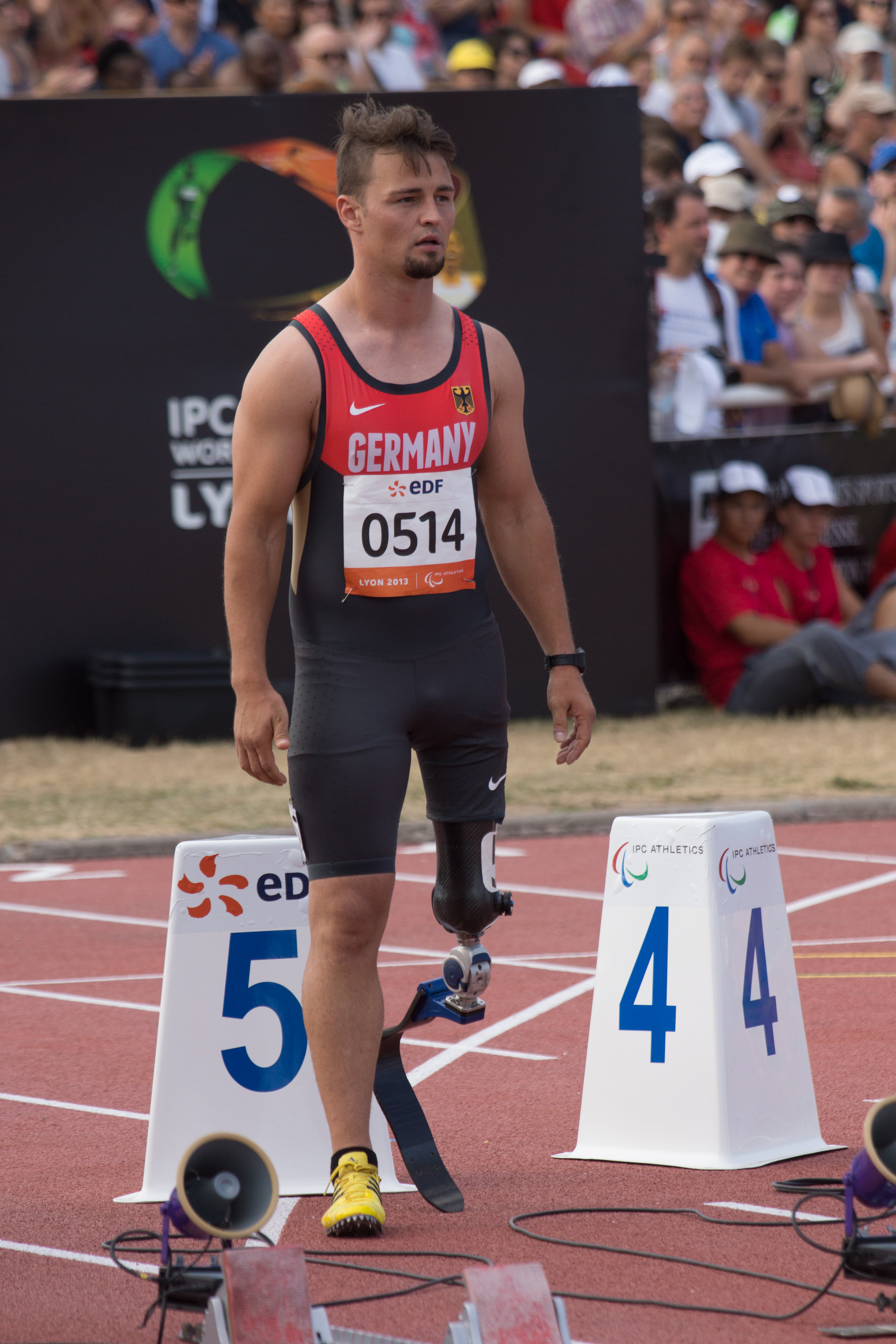
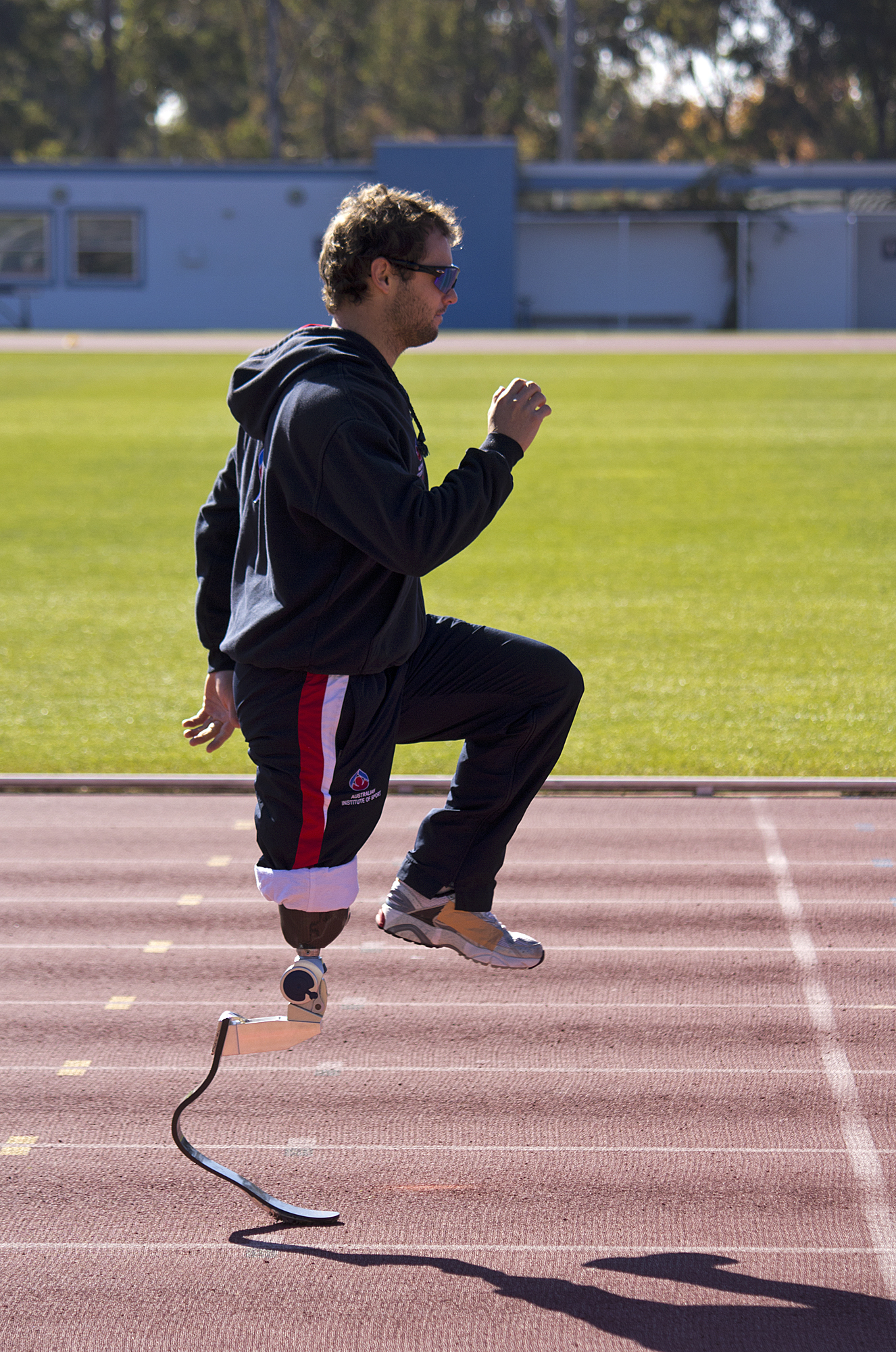
Heinrich Popow (left) before the T42 100m final on Day 7 which he drew with Scott Reardon (right).

Two world records were broken and one equaled on day 7, two in throwing events and one on the track. Vladimir Sviridov of Russia equaled the world record in the F36 shot put in his very first throw with a distance of 14.70m. Fellow Russian Chermen Kobesov added a gold medal to his silver from the long jump with a world record in the T37 400m. The final record of the day was achieved in the F53/53 javelin where Alphanso Cunningham gave Jamaica their first gold of the Championships.

Jamaica were one of five countries to collect their first gold medal of the games on Day 7. Syria won a gold in the F56/57 shot put, awarded to Mohamed Mohamed, the sole representative of his country. Ihar Fartunau of Belarus reached a height of 1.93 to win the T13 high jump, while Chiang Chih-Chung of Chinese Taipei threw 59.29m in the F12/13 javelin. The fifth country to gain their first gold in Lyon was Austria, won in the T46 400m by Gunther Matzinger.

Marcel Hug continued to stamp his mark on the competition with his third gold of the Championships, winning the T54 1,500m. Birgit Kober of Germany became a double gold medal winner adding the F32/33/34 shot put to her javelin title won three days earlier. Xia Dong of China put behind the disappointment of failing to clinch the gold in the F37/38 discus by setting a Championship record in the F37 shot put. While Australia began to hit the top spot with gold winning achievements for Evan O'Hanlon (T38 400m), and after an appeal by the Australian team Scott Reardon shared the T42 100m title with German rival Heinrich Popow. Initially Popow had been declared the winner by a few thousandths of a second, but later the two men shared the podium together after one of the most contested races of the games.

=== Day 8 (27 June) ===
American wheelchair racer Tatyana McFadden sealed her position as the most successful athlete of the Championships when she won her sixth gold medal by taking the 400m T54. The United States also celebrated a fifth gold medal from Raymond Martin who like McFadden also won every event he entered, finishing with the T52 400m. Other gold medals for the United States came from Elexis Gillette in the T11 long jump, Cassie Mitchell, who added the F53/53 shot put to her silver and two bronzes won on the track, and a team medal in the men's 4 x 100 metres relay T42-46 setting a new world record. The other relay finals were won by Canada in the men's 4 x 400 metres T53/54 and Russia in the men's 4 x 100 metres T35-38.

As well as the relay, Russia finished the Championship with more gold medal success. Nikita Prokhorov won the F46 discus and Evgeniya Trushnikova won the T37 400m, both setting tournament records. Russia finished Day 8 with golds for Egor Sharov in the T12 400m, Elena Pautova in the T12 1,500m and two new world records for Marta Prokofyeva in the F12 shot put and Dmitrii Safronov in the T35 200m. Two further world records were broken on the penultimate day, both by Algerian athletes. Nassima Saifi threw a distance of 42.05m in the F57/58 women's discus while her countryman Lahouari Bahlaz, also a discus thrower, recorded 22.75 in the joint F32/33/34 event.

Azerbaijan secured their first gold medal of the Championships when Vladimir Zayets won the T12 triple jump, a feat equaled by Namibia who took their sixth medal of the games with a top podium finish for Nambala Johannes in the T13 400m. Walid Ktila struck again for a fourth gold medal, this time in the T34 400m, while there were second gold medals for China's Zhou Hongzhuan (T53 400m), the Netherlands Marlou van Rhijn (T44 200m) and Italian duo Martina Caironi (T42 100m) and Oxana Corso (T35 200m). The final track medal of the day went to Michelle Stilwell of Canada who added the T52 200m event to her 100m and 800m titles.

=== Day 9 (28 July) ===
The final day of the Championships took in five events all in the marathon. There was only one women's race, the T54 classification, with ten competitors from six different nations. The three medal winners all crossed the finish line within a second of each other, with eventual winner Switzerland's Manuela Schär recording a final time of 1:49.45. Switzerland made it a double in the T54 marathon when Marcel Hug dominated the men's race to win by over three minutes to collect his fifth gold medal of the games.

Chile gained its first gold medal of the Championship when Cristian Valenzuela won the T11 marathon. With two silver medals already to his name; in the 1,500 and 5,000m, Valenzuela made Chile the most successful nation in proportion to the size of their team, being his country's only competitor. The T46 marathon was a limited field with only four challengers for the title. Italy's Alessandro Di Lello took gold, beating his nearest rival by almost 15 minutes. The T12 marathon saw Paralympic champion El Amin Chentouf of Morocco finishing close to the Championship record to cement his dominance in his classification.

== Participating nations ==
Below is the list of countries who agreed to participate in the Championships and the requested number of athlete places for each. (Note: The PDF displays a total of 94 countries, but was published on 19 July 2013 and may not reflect the exact participants or the exact countries that may have arrived for the Championships.)

- Algeria (25)
- Angola (4)
- Argentina (13)
- Australia (36)
- Austria (5)
- Azerbaijan (9)
- Bahrain (4)
- Belarus (3)
- Belgium (8)
- Benin (2)
- Bermuda (1)
- Bosnia and Herzegovina (2)
- Brazil (35)
- Brunei (1)
- Bulgaria (9)
- Cameroon (1)
- Canada (32)
- Cape Verde (2)
- Central African Republic (1)
- Chile (1)
- China (22)
- Chinese Taipei (4)
- Colombia (18)
- Croatia (14)
- Cuba (6)
- Czech Republic (15)
- Denmark (5)
- Djibouti (1)
- Egypt (12)
- Ethiopia (1)
- Finland (10)
- France (33)
- Gambia (1)
- Germany (26)
- Great Britain (46)
- Greece (19)
- Hong Kong (1)
- Hungary (4)
- Iceland (3)
- India (10)
- Iran (11)
- Iraq (7)
- Ireland (8)
- Israel (1)
- Italy (12)
- Jamaica (5)
- Japan (34)
- Jordan (2)
- Kazakhstan (8)
- Kenya (5)
- Kuwait (8)
- Latvia (7)
- Libya (5)
- Lithuania (6)
- Luxembourg (1)
- Malaysia (7)
- Mexico (21)
- Montenegro (1)
- Mongolia (1)
- Morocco (15)
- Mozambique (2)
- Namibia (8)
- Netherlands (9)
- New Zealand (2)
- Nigeria (5)
- Norway (1)
- Palestine (3)
- Poland (35)
- Portugal (21)
- Qatar (2)
- Romania (2)
- Russia (66)
- Rwanda (1)
- Saudi Arabia (5)
- Senegal (1)
- Serbia (5)
- Slovakia (8)
- Slovenia (4)
- South Africa (28)
- South Korea (6)
- Spain (25)
- Sri Lanka (8)
- Sweden (10)
- Switzerland (14)
- Syria (1)
- Thailand (11)
- Tunisia (12)
- Turkey (13)
- Uganda (1)
- Ukraine (32)
- United Arab Emirates (18)
- United States (76)
- Uzbekistan (5)
- Venezuela (23)

== Footnotes ==
Notes
