= Stade du Rhône =

Sports venue in Lyon

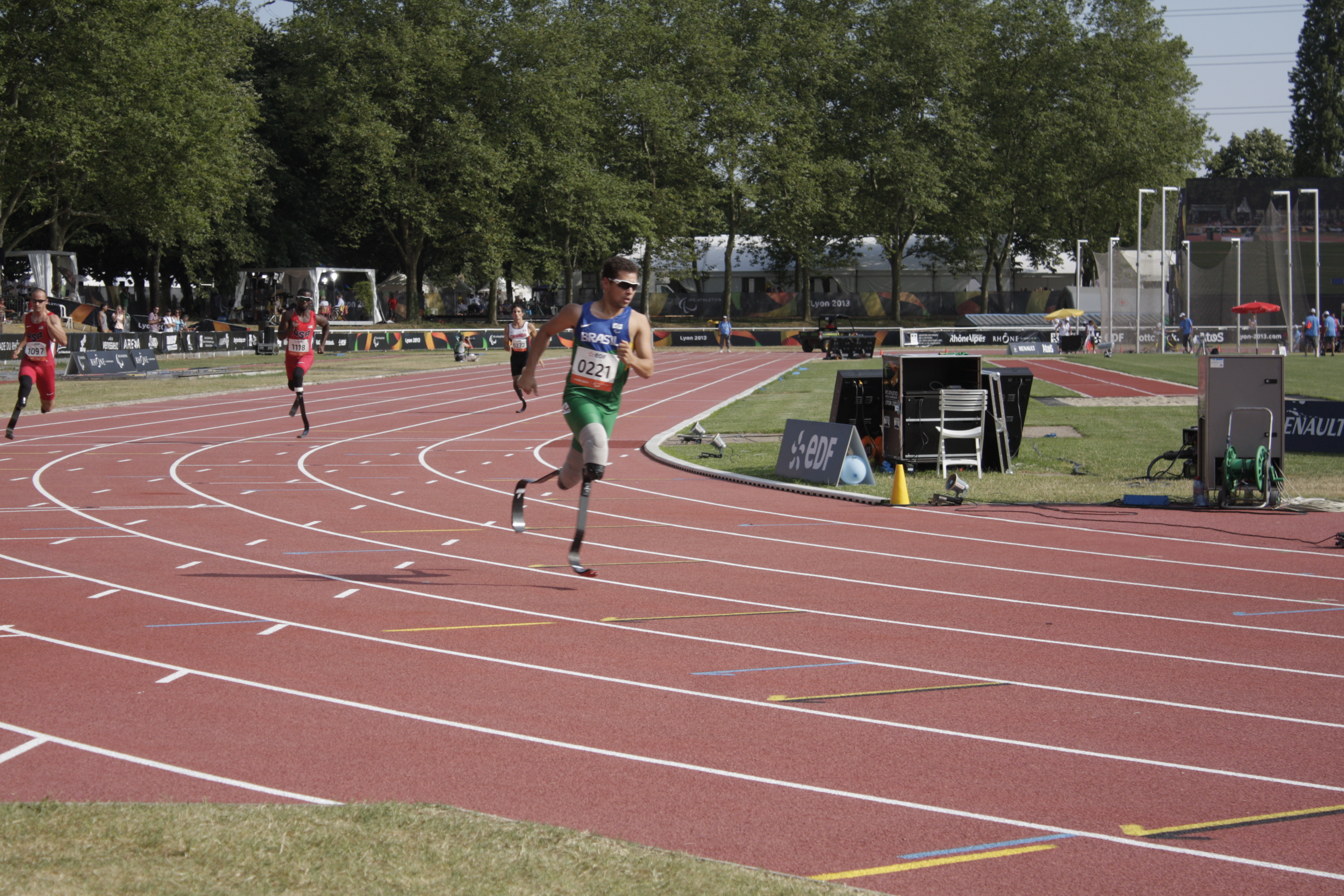
- Alan Oliveira leads the field at the Stade du Rhône during the 2013 IPC World Championships.
- Interactive map of Stade du Rhône
- Location: Parc de Parilly, Vénissieux, Lyon, France
- Coordinates: 45°43′05″N 04°53′41″E
- Surface: Track and field (grass)
- Public transit: Parilly

Stade du Rhône is an athletics stadium located in the Parc de Parilly in the commune of Vénissieux in Lyon, France.

== History ==
The Stadium was initially built as the Parilly Stadium, but was renamed Stade du Rhône in 2012 after a major renovation in preparation for the 2013 IPC Athletics World Championships. The new development was inaugurated on 3 September 2012 and the main grandstand was named Tribune Tony Bertrand.
