= 2014 IPC Athletics European Championships – Men's 100 metres =

The men's 100 metres at the 2014 IPC Athletics European Championships was held at the Swansea University Stadium from 18–23 August.

== Medalists ==
Event	Gold		Silver		Bronze	
T11	Andrey Koptev; Russia	11.60	Firmino Baptista; Portugal	11.90	Martín Parejo Maza; Spain	11.96
T12	Jason Smyth; Ireland	10.78	Artem Loginov; Russia	11.16	Joan Munar Martínez; Spain	11.19
T13	Radoslav Zlatanov; Bulgaria	11.22	Mateusz Michalski; Poland	11.34	Philipp Handler; Switzerland	11.54
T34	Henry Manni; Finland	16.42	Bojan Mitic; Switzerland	16.44	Sebastien Mobre; France	16.75
T35	Dmitrii Safronov; Russia	12.73	Iurii Tsaruk; Ukraine	13.11	Jordan Howe; Great Britain	13.23
T36	Evgenii Shvetcov; Russia	12.33	Graeme Ballard; Great Britain	12.49	Paul Blake; Great Britain	12.69
T37	Andrey Vdovin; Russia	11.49	Chermen Kobesov; Russia	11.63	Rhys Jones; Great Britain	12.08
T38	Mykyta Senyk; Ukraine	11.74	Lorenzo Albaladejo Martínez; Spain	12.02	Bradley Lee Wigley; Great Britain	12.07
T42	Clavel Kayitaré; France	13.08	Daniel Jørgensen; Denmark	13.45	Anton Prokhorov; Russia	13.48
T44	Jonnie Peacock; Great Britain	11.26	Felix Streng; Germany	11.53	Markus Rehm; Germany	11.85
T47	Michał Derus; Poland	11.04	Ola Abidogun; Great Britain	11.38	Vadim Trunov; Germany	11.50
T51	Toni Piispanen; Finland	23.56	Peter Genyn; Belgium	24.34	Stephen Osborne; Great Britain	24.98
T52	Beat Bösch; Switzerland	18.62	Artem Shishkovskiy; Russia	19.24	Mário Trindade; Portugal	19.64
T53	Mickey Bushell; Great Britain	15.58	Pierre Fairbank; France	15.78	Nicolas Brignone; France	16.53
T54	Leo-Pekka Tähti; Finland	14.19	Kenny van Weeghel; Netherlands	14.35	Marc Schuh; Germany	14.77

== Results ==
=== T11 ===
Semifinals

Rank	Heat	Sport Class	Name	Nationality	Time	Notes
1	1	T11	Timothée Adolphe	France	11.66	Q, PB
2	2	T11	Andrey Koptev	Russia	11.67	Q
3	1	T11	Martín Parejo Maza	Spain	11.68	q, PB
3	1	T11	Firmino Baptista	Portugal	11.68	q PB
4	2	T11	Gauthier Tresor Makunda	France	11.92	
5	1	T11	Pablo Cantero Lopez	Spain	12.02	
6	2	T11	Xavier Porras	Spain	16.77	

Final

Rank	Sport Class	Name	Nationality	Time	Notes
1st place, gold medalist(s)	T11	Andrey Koptev	Russia	11.60	
2nd place, silver medalist(s)	T11	Firmino Baptista	Portugal	11.90	
3rd place, bronze medalist(s)	T11	Martín Parejo Maza	Spain	11.96	
—	T11	Timothée Adolphe	France	DQ	

=== T12 ===
Semifinals

Rank	Heat	Sport Class	Name	Nationality	Time	Notes
1	1	T12	Artem Loginov	Russia	11.21	Q
2	2	T12	Joan Munar Martínez	Spain	11.27	Q, PB
3	3	T12	Jason Smyth	Ireland	11.40	Q
4	1	T12	Thomas Ulbricht	Germany	11.41	q, SB
5	2	T12	Fedor Trikolich	Russia	11.50	
6	3	T12	Andrei Kuzmin	Russia	11.80	
7	1	T12	Antoine Perel	France	12.13	
8	3	T12	Suat Oner	Turkey	12.18	

Final

Rank	Sport Class	Name	Nationality	Time	Notes
1st place, gold medalist(s)	T12	Jason Smyth	Ireland	10.78	
2nd place, silver medalist(s)	T12	Artem Loginov	Russia	11.16	
3rd place, bronze medalist(s)	T12	Joan Munar Martínez	Spain	11.19	PB
4	T12	Thomas Ulbricht	Germany	11.51	

=== T13 ===
Semifinals

Rank	Heat	Sport Class	Name	Nationality	Time	Notes
1	1	T13	Radoslav Zlatanov	Bulgaria	11.25	Q, SB
2	1	T13	Philipp Handler	Switzerland	11.63	Q
3	2	T13	Mateusz Michalski	Poland	11.65	Q
4	2	T13	Alexey Labzin	Russia	11.71	Q
5	1	T13	Tobias Jonsson	Sweden	11.82	Q
6	1	T13	Daniel Wozniak	Poland	11.82	q, PB
7	2	T13	Per Jonsson	Sweden	11.82	Q
8	1	T13	Vladyslav Hrebenyk	Ukraine	11.84	q
9	2	T13	Edgars Klavins	Latvia	11.85	
10	1	T13	Diego Sancho Villanueva	Spain	11.92	
11	1	T13	Vegard Dragsund Nilsen	Norway	12.01	
12	2	T13	Iván José Cano Blanco	Spain	12.05	
13	2	T13	Bacou Dambakate	France	12.07	
14	2	T13	Rodolfo Alves	Portugal	12.45	
15	1	T13	Petre Prundaru	Romania	12.48	

Final

Rank	Sport Class	Name	Nationality	Time	Notes
1st place, gold medalist(s)	T13	Radoslav Zlatanov	Bulgaria	11.22	SB
2nd place, silver medalist(s)	T13	Mateusz Michalski	Poland	11.34	
3rd place, bronze medalist(s)	T13	Philipp Handler	Switzerland	11.54	
4	T13	Alexey Labzin	Russia	11.54	
5	T13	Tobias Jonsson	Sweden	11.75	
6	T13	Per Jonsson	Sweden	11.78	
7	T13	Daniel Wozniak	Poland	11.82	
8	T13	Vladyslav Hrebenyk	Ukraine	11.86	

=== T34 ===
Semifinals

Rank	Heat	Sport Class	Name	Nationality	Time	Notes
1	2	T34	Henry Manni	Finland	16.69	Q
2	2	T34	Sebastien Mobre	France	16.78	Q
3	2	T34	Bojan Mitic	Switzerland	16.79	Q
4	1	T34	Stefan Rusch	Netherlands	17.52	Q
5	1	T34	Tuomas Manni	Finland	17.96	Q
6	1	T34	Ben Rowlings	United Kingdom	17.99	Q
7	2	T34	Isaac Towers	United Kingdom	18.44	q
8	2	T34	Bart Pijs	Netherlands	19.10	q
9	1	T34	Henk Schuiling	Netherlands	19.33	

Final

Rank	Sport Class	Name	Nationality	Time	Notes
1st place, gold medalist(s)	T34	Henry Manni	Finland	16,42	
2nd place, silver medalist(s)	T34	Bojan Mitic	Switzerland	16.44	
3rd place, bronze medalist(s)	T34	Sebastien Mobre	France	16.75	
4	T34	Stefan Rusch	Netherlands	16.83	
5	T34	Tuomas Manni	Finland	17.16	
6	T34	Ben Rowlings	United Kingdom	17.31	
7	T34	Isaac Towers	United Kingdom	18.00	
8	T34	Bart Pijs	Netherlands	18.63	

=== T35 ===
Final

Rank	Sport Class	Name	Nationality	Time	Notes
1st place, gold medalist(s)	T35	Dmitrii Safronov	Russia	12.73	SB
2nd place, silver medalist(s)	T35	Iurii Tsaruk	Ukraine	13.11	
3rd place, bronze medalist(s)	T35	Jordan Howe	United Kingdom	13.23	
4	T35	Niels Stein	Germany	13.88	
5	T35	Kevin de Loght	Belgium	15.06	SB

=== T36 ===
Rank	Sport Class	Name	Nationality	Time	Notes
1st place, gold medalist(s)	T36	Evgenii Shvetcov	Russia	12.33	SB
2nd place, silver medalist(s)	T36	Graeme Ballard	United Kingdom	12.49	
3rd place, bronze medalist(s)	T36	Paul Blake	United Kingdom	12.69	
4	T36	Roman Pavlyk	Ukraine	12.74	
5	T36	Ben Rushgrove	United Kingdom	12.89	
6	T36	Marcin Mielczarek	Poland	13.35	
7	T36	Mikhail Bondarenko	Russia	13.89	
—	T36	Mariusz Sobczak	Poland	DNF	

=== T37 ===
Final

Rank	Sport Class	Name	Nationality	Time	Notes
1st place, gold medalist(s)	T37	Andrey Vdovin	Russia	11.49	
2nd place, silver medalist(s)	T37	Chermen Kobesov	Russia	11.63	
3rd place, bronze medalist(s)	T37	Rhys Jones	United Kingdom	12.08	
4	T37	Andriy Onufriyenko	Ukraine	12.24	
5	T37	Jelmar Bos	Netherlands	12.28	
6	T37	Iasonas Gantes	Greece	12.58	PB
7	T37	Mateusz Owczarek	Poland	12.80	
8	T37	Kamil Golebski	Poland	13.01	

=== T38 ===
Final

Rank	Sport Class	Name	Nationality	Time	Notes
1st place, gold medalist(s)	T38	Mykyta Senyk	Ukraine	11.74	
2nd place, silver medalist(s)	T38	Lorenzo Albaladejo Martínez	Spain	12.02	
3rd place, bronze medalist(s)	T38	Bradley Lee Wigley	United Kingdom	12.07	
4	T38	Aristotelis Marinos	Greece	12.97	

=== T42 ===
Final

Rank	Sport Class	Name	Nationality	Time	Notes
1st place, gold medalist(s)	T42	Clavel Kayitare	France	13.08	
2nd place, silver medalist(s)	T42	Daniel Jørgensen	Denmark	13.45	
3rd place, bronze medalist(s)	T42	Anton Prokhorov	Russia	13.48	
4	T42	Mindaugas Bernotas	Lithuania	14.26	
5	T42	Baris Telli	Turkey	15.76	PB

=== T44 ===
Final

Rank	Sport Class	Name	Nationality	Time	Notes
1st place, gold medalist(s)	T44	Jonnie Peacock	United Kingdom	11.26	
2nd place, silver medalist(s)	T44	Felix Streng	Germany	11.53	
3rd place, bronze medalist(s)	T44	Markus Rehm	Germany	11.85	
4	T44	Ronald Hertog	Netherlands	12.10	
5	T44	David Behre	Germany	12.31	
6	T44	Emanuele Di Marino	Italy	12.72	
7	T44	Ivan Prokopyev	Russia	12.78	
8	T44	Jean-Baptiste Alaize	France	13.24	
—	T44	Vadim Aleshkin	Russia	DNS	

=== T47 ===
Final

Rank	Sport Class	Name	Nationality	Time	Notes
1st place, gold medalist(s)	T47	Michał Derus	Poland	11.04	
2nd place, silver medalist(s)	T47	Ola Abidogun	United Kingdom	11.38	
3rd place, bronze medalist(s)	T47	Vadim Trunov	Russia	11.50	
4	T47	Maciej Kesicki	Poland	11.73	
5	T47	Kasper Filsoe	Denmark	12.00	
6	T46	Mihail Hristov	Bulgaria	12.02	
7	T46	Michael Hittenberger	Austria	12.10	
8	T47	Antonio Andújar Arroyo	Spain	12.71	

=== T51 ===
Final

Rank	Sport Class	Name	Nationality	Time	Notes
1st place, gold medalist(s)	T51	Toni Piispanen	Finland	23.56	
2nd place, silver medalist(s)	T51	Peter Genyn	Belgium	24.34	
3rd place, bronze medalist(s)	T51	Stephen Osborne	United Kingdom	24.98	
4	T51	Alvise De Vidi	Italy	25.03	
5	T51	John McCarthy	Ireland	26.25	
6	T51	Stefan Strobel	Germany	29.28	

=== T52 ===
Final

Rank	Sport Class	Name	Nationality	Time	Notes
1st place, gold medalist(s)	T52	Beat Bösch	Switzerland	18.62	
2nd place, silver medalist(s)	T52	Artem Shishkovskiy	Russia	19.24	
3rd place, bronze medalist(s)	T52	Mário Trindade	Portugal	19.64	
4	T52	Thomas Geierspichler	Austria	20.12	
5	T52	Rob Smith	United Kingdom	20.42	

=== T53 ===
Rank	Sport Class	Name	Nationality	Time	Notes
1st place, gold medalist(s)	T53	Mickey Bushell	United Kingdom	15.58	
2nd place, silver medalist(s)	T53	Pierre Fairbank	France	15.78	SB
3rd place, bronze medalist(s)	T53	Nicolas Brignone	France	16.53	
4	T53	Ivan Carmelo Messina	Italy	18.09	
5	T53	Arnar Helgi Larusson	Iceland	18.86	

=== T54 ===
Rank	Sport Class	Name	Nationality	Time	Notes
1st place, gold medalist(s)	T54	Leo-Pekka Tähti	Finland	14.19	
2nd place, silver medalist(s)	T54	Kenny van Weeghel	Netherlands	14.35	
3rd place, bronze medalist(s)	T54	Marc Schuh	Germany	14.77	
4	T54	Niklas Almers	Sweden	15.09	
5	T54	Esa-Pekka Mattila	Finland	15.43	
6	T54	Alex Adelaide	France	16.22	

== See also ==
- List of IPC world records in athletics
