= 2017 World Para Athletics Championships – Men's long jump =

The men's long jump at the 2017 World Para Athletics Championships was held at the Olympic Stadium in London from 14 to 23 July.

== Medalists ==
Event	Gold		Silver		Bronze	
T11	Lex Gillette; United States	6.27	Ruslan Katyshev; Ukraine	6.21	Ricardo Costa de Oliveira; Brazil	6.21
T12	Doniyor Saliev; Uzbekistan	7.18 AR	Tobias Jonsson; Sweden	6.99 PB	Siarhei Burdukou; Belarus	6.77
T13	Luis Felipe Gutiérrez; Cuba	7.40CR	Radoslav Zlatanov; Bulgaria	6.88 PB	Isaac Jean-Paul; United States	6.84
T20	Abdul Latif Romly; Malaysia	7.37 CR	Zoran Talić; Croatia	7.32 AR	Dmytro Prudnikov; Ukraine	7.12
T36	Roman Pavlyk; Ukraine	5.63 PB	Rodrigo Parreira da Silva; Brazil	5.55 SB	Brayden Davidson; Australia	5.39
T37	Shang Guangxu; China	6.58 CR	Mateus Evangelista Cardoso; Brazil	6.10	Vladyslav Zahrebelnyi; Ukraine	5.95 =PB
T38	Hu Jianwen; China	6.80 SB	Zhong Huanghao; China	6.79 PB	Mykyta Senyk; Ukraine	6.12
T42	Daniel Wagner; Denmark	6.50 CR	Atsushi Yamamoto; Japan	6.44 SB	Léon Schäfer; Germany	6.25
T44	Markus Rehm; Germany	8.00	Ronald Hertog; Netherlands	6.94	Jean-Baptiste Alaize; France	6.82 PB
T47	Wang Hao; China	7.18 SB	Arnaud Assoumani; France	7.13	Tobi Fawehinmi; United States	7.03 SB
WR world record | AR area record | CR championship record | GR games record | NR national record | OR Olympic record | PB personal best | SB season best | WL world leading (in a given season)

Events listed in pink were contested but no medals were awarded.

== Detailed results ==
=== T11 ===
Rank	Athlete	1	2	3	4	5	6	Best	Notes
1st place, gold medalist(s)	Lex Gillette (USA)	6.07	6.24	6.00	6.22	6.27	4.68	6.27	
2nd place, silver medalist(s)	Ruslan Katyshev (UKR)	5.86	6.17	6.06	6.21	x	x	6.21	
3rd place, bronze medalist(s)	Ricardo Costa de Oliveira (BRA)	5.94	x	x	6.21	x	x	6.21	
4	Xavier Porras (ESP)	5.80	5.90	5.87	5.72	5.80	5.84	5.90	SB
5	Martín Parejo Maza (ESP)	5.75	5.38	5.46	5.40	5.16	5.01	5.75	
6	Modestas Grauslys (LTU)	5.21	x	5.32	5.39	5.46	3.33	5.46	
7	Alexis Acosta (ARG)	5.24	4.98	5.03	5.20	5.24	5.39	5.39	
8	Christos Tsiouris (GRE)	x	x	3.95	4.84	4.72	5.06	5.06	

=== T12 ===
Rank	Athlete	1	2	3	4	5	6	Best	Notes
1st place, gold medalist(s)	Doniyor Saliev (UZB)	7.07	7.17	7.12	7.10	7.03	7.18	7.18	AR
2nd place, silver medalist(s)	Tobias Jonsson (SWE)	6.75	6.99	6.79	6.86	6.84	6.80	6.99	PB
3rd place, bronze medalist(s)	Siarhei Burdukou (BLR)	6.74	6.44	6.44	6.77	6.73	6.72	6.77	
4	Hilton Langenhoven (RSA)	6.67	6.68	6.72	x	6.75	6.75	6.75	
5	Chen Mingyu (CHN)	6.57	6.68	6.48	6.53	6.24	6.50	6.68	
6	Per Jonsson (SWE)	6.44	6.48	6.58	6.63	6.36	6.64	6.64	SB
7	Mohamad Saifuddin Ishak (MAS)	5.93	5.96	6.08	6.00	x	x	6.08	

=== T20 ===
Rank	Athlete	1	2	3	4	5	6	Best	Notes
1st place, gold medalist(s)	Abdul Latif Romly (MAS)	6.97	6.90	6.94	7.36	7.37	7.11	7.37	CR
2nd place, silver medalist(s)	Zoran Talić (CRO)	7.32	7.23	6.87	6.94	7.18	6.94	7.32	AR
3rd place, bronze medalist(s)	Dmytro Prudnikov (UKR)	6.93	7.12	x	7.01	x	x	7.12	
4	Ranki Oberoi (NED)	6.83	x	6.68	6.81	6.90	x	6.90	SB
5	Nicholas Hum (AUS)	x	6.60	6.67	6.40	5.97	6.78	6.78	
6	Ronny Mauricio Santos Iza (ECU)	x	6.67	6.35	-	-	-	6.67	
7	Suhairi Suhani (SGP)	x	6.20	6.57	x	6.58	6.49	6.58	
8	Mitsuo Yamaguchi (JPN)	6.55	6.46	6.13	x	6.13	6.16	6.55	
9	Carlos Lima (POR)	6.09	6.06	6.01	-	-	-	6.09	
10	Damian Carcelen (ECU)	x	6.05	5.21				6.05	
11	Francisco Perez Carrera (ESP)	x	5.97	x				5.97	SB
12	Alain Omar Villamarin (ARG)	x	5.78	5.96				5.96	
13	Mariusz Pietrucha (POL)	5.92	5.79	x				5.92	

=== T38 ===
Rank	Athlete	1	2	3	4	5	6	Best	Notes
1st place, gold medalist(s)	Hu Jianwen (CHN)	5.65	6.80	6.70	6.46	-	6.56	6.80	SB
2nd place, silver medalist(s)	Zhong Huanghao (CHN)	x	x	5.62	6.59	6.55	6.79	6.79	PB
3rd place, bronze medalist(s)	Mykyta Senyk (UKR)	6.12	5.87	5.96	5.97	6.12	5.91	6.12	
4	Moussa Tambadou (FRA)	5.44	x	5.81	x	5.61	5.71	5.81	SB
5	Davit Kavtaradze (GEO)	5.40	5.31	4.76	5.06	4.83	5.32	5.40	

== See also ==
- List of IPC world records in athletics
