= 2014 IPC Athletics European Championships – Men's long jump =

Sporting competition

The men's long jump at the 2014 IPC Athletics European Championships was held at the Swansea University Stadium from 18–23 August.

== Medalists ==
| Event | Gold | | Silver | | Bronze | |
|---|---|---|---|---|---|---|
| T11 | Ruslan Katyshev; Ukraine | 5.96 | Martin Parejo Maza; Spain | 5.94 | Xavier Porras; Spain | 5.93 |
| T12 | Siarhei Burdukou; Belarus | 6.76 | Oleg Panyutin; Azerbaijan | 6.62 | Ihar Fartunau; Belarus | 6.56 |
| T13 | Per Jonsson; Sweden | 6.91 | Iván José Cano Blanco; Spain | 6.58 | Tobias Jonsson; Sweden | 6.39 |
| T20 | Zoran Talic; Croatia | 7.16 | Lenine Cunha; Portugal | 6.84 | Dmytro Prudnikov; Ukraine | 6.82 |
| T36 | Roman Pavlyk; Ukraine | 5.28 | Mariusz Sobczak; Poland | 5.20 | Marcin Mielczarek; Poland | 5.15 |
| T37 | Andriy Onufriyenko; Ukraine | 5.71 | Vladislav Barinov; Russia | 5.70 | Gocha Khugaev; Russia | 5.59 |
| T38 | Mykyta Senyk; Ukraine | 5.79 | Konstantinos Kamaras; Greece | 5.42 | Moussa Tambadou; France | 5.41 |
| T42/44 | Markus Rehm (T44); Germany | 7.63; 1086 pts | Daniel Jorgensen (T42); Denmark | 6.22; 975 pts | Ronald Hertog (T44); Netherlands | 6.78; 930 pts |
| T47 | Georgios Kostakis; Greece | 6.50 | Mihail Hristov; Bulgaria | 6.29 | Simonas Kurutis; Lithuania | 6.24 |

== Results ==
=== T11 ===
| Rank | Name | Nationality | Result | Notes |
|---|---|---|---|---|
| 1st place, gold medalist(s) | Ruslan Katyshev | Ukraine | 5.96 | |
| 2nd place, silver medalist(s) | Martin Parejo Maza | Spain | 5.94 | PB |
| 3rd place, bronze medalist(s) | Xavier Porras | Spain | 5.93 | |
| 4 | Athanasios Barakas | Greece | 5.60 | |
| 5 | Modestas Grauslys | Lithuania | 5.41 | |
| 6 | Pablo Cantero Lopez | Spain | 5.40 | PB |
| 7 | Mehmet Tunc | Turkey | 4.62 | |

=== T12 ===
| Rank | Name | Nationality | Result | Notes |
|---|---|---|---|---|
| 1st place, gold medalist(s) | Siarhei Burdukou | Belarus | 6.76 | PB |
| 2nd place, silver medalist(s) | Oleg Panyutin | Azerbaijan | 6.62 | SB |
| 3rd place, bronze medalist(s) | Ihar Fartunau | Belarus | 6.56 | |
| 4 | Evgeny Kegelev | Russia | 6.46 | |
| 5 | Antoine Perel | France | 6.35 | |
| 6 | Andrey Shashko | Russia | 6.32 | SB |
| 7 | Vladislav Agapov | Russia | 5.88 | |
| 8 | Zulfikar Sure | Turkey | 5.68 | |
| — | Milos Ranitovic | Montenegro | NM | |

=== T13 ===
| Rank | Name | Nationality | Time | Notes |
|---|---|---|---|---|
| 1st place, gold medalist(s) | Per Jonsson | Sweden | 6.91 | |
| 2nd place, silver medalist(s) | Iván José Cano Blanco | Spain | 6.58 | |
| 3rd place, bronze medalist(s) | Tobias Jonsson | Sweden | 6.39 | |
| 4 | Radoslav Zlatanov | Bulgaria | 6.29 | |
| 5 | Juozas Eigminas | Lithuania | 6.09 | PB |
| 6 | Vladyslav Hrebenyk | Ukraine | 5.95 | |
| 7 | Vegard Dragsund Nilsen | Norway | 5.85 | PB |
| 8 | Petre Prundaru | Romania | 5.49 | PB |

=== T20 ===
| Rank | Name | Nationality | Time | Notes |
|---|---|---|---|---|
| 1st place, gold medalist(s) | Zoran Talić | Croatia | 7.16 | SB |
| 2nd place, silver medalist(s) | Lenine Cunha | Portugal | 6.84 | SB |
| 3rd place, bronze medalist(s) | Dmytro Prudnikov | Ukraine | 6.82 | |
| 4 | Ranki Oberoi | Netherlands | 6.79 | |
| 5 | Evangelos Kanavos | Greece | 6.57 | |
| 6 | Sebastian Vogt | Germany | 6.44 | SB |
| 7 | Jose Antonio Exposito Pineiro | Spain | 6.29 | |
| 8 | Francisco Perez Carrera | Spain | 6.14 | PB |
| 9 | Leonid Ustyuzhanin | Russia | 6.13 | |
| 10 | Jose Luis Chaparro Bueno | Spain | 5.87 | |
| 11 | Carlos Lima | Portugal | 5.68 | PB |

=== T36 ===
| Rank | Name | Nationality | Time | Notes |
|---|---|---|---|---|
| 1st place, gold medalist(s) | Roman Pavlyk | Ukraine | 5.28 | |
| 2nd place, silver medalist(s) | Mariusz Sobczak | Poland | 5.20 | |
| 3rd place, bronze medalist(s) | Marcin Mielczarek | Poland | 5.15 | SB |
| 4 | Anastasios Petropoulos | Greece | 4.87 | |
| 5 | Mikhail Bondarenko | Russia | 4.77 | |
| 6 | Pawel Piotrowski | Russia | 4.00 | |

=== T37 ===
| Rank | Name | Nationality | Time | Notes |
|---|---|---|---|---|
| 1st place, gold medalist(s) | Andriy Onufriyenko | Ukraine | 5.71 | |
| 2nd place, silver medalist(s) | Vladislav Barinov | Russia | 5.70 | |
| 3rd place, bronze medalist(s) | Gocha Khugaev | Russia | 5.59 | |
| 4 | Dmitrijs Silovs | Latvia | 5.24 | |
| 5 | Iasonas Gantes | Greece | 5.05 | SB |
| 6 | Mateusz Owczarek | Poland | 4.95 | |
| 7 | Jiri Kohout | Czech Republic | 4.58 | |
| 8 | Lukas Lacnak | Czech Republic | 4.29 | PB |

=== T38 ===
| Rank | Name | Nationality | Time | Notes |
|---|---|---|---|---|
| 1st place, gold medalist(s) | Mykyta Senyk | Ukraine | 5.79 | |
| 2nd place, silver medalist(s) | Konstantinos Kamaras | Greece | 5.42 | |
| 3rd place, bronze medalist(s) | Moussa Tambadou | France | 5.41 | |
| 4 | Aristotelis Marinos | Greece | 4.87 | |

=== T42/44 ===
| Rank | Sport Class | Name | Nationality | Time | Points | Notes |
|---|---|---|---|---|---|---|
| 1st place, gold medalist(s) | T44 | Markus Rehm | Germany | 7.63 | 1086 | |
| 2nd place, silver medalist(s) | T42 | Daniel Jorgensen | Denmark | 6.22 | 975 | PB |
| 3rd place, bronze medalist(s) | T44 | Ronald Hertog | Netherlands | 6.78 | 930 | |
| 4 | T44 | Felix Streng | Germany | 6.41 | 819 | SB |
| 5 | T44 | Roberto La Barbera | Italy | 6.18 | 734 | |
| 6 | T44 | Maciej Lepiato | Poland | 5.95 | 637 | |
| 7 | T44 | Vadim Aleshkin | Russia | 5.89 | 610 | PB |
| 8 | T44 | Jean-Baptiste Alaize | France | 5.83 | 582 | |
| 9 | T42 | Mindaugas Bernotas | Lithuania | 4.91 | 424 | |

=== T47 ===
| Rank | Sport Class | Name | Nationality | Time | Notes |
|---|---|---|---|---|---|
| 1st place, gold medalist(s) | T46 | Georgios Kostakis | Greece | 6.50 | |
| 2nd place, silver medalist(s) | T46 | Mihail Hristov | Bulgaria | 6.29 | PB |
| 3rd place, bronze medalist(s) | T46 | Simonas Kurutis | Lithuania | 6.24 | PB |
| 4 | T47 | Christos Koutoulias | Greece | 6.20 | |
| 5 | T46 | Aliaksandr Subota | Belarus | 6.11 | |
| 6 | T47 | Antonio Andujar Arroyo | Spain | 5.85 | |
| 7 | T47 | Michal Derus | Poland | 5.80 | |
| 8 | T47 | Florin Marius Cojoc | Romania | 5.73 | |
| 9 | T47 | Ciprian Baraian | Romania | 5.59 | PB |

== See also ==
- List of IPC world records in athletics
