= 2016 IPC Athletics European Championships – Men's long jump =

The men's long jump at the 2016 IPC Athletics European Championships was held at the Stadio Olimpico Carlo Zecchini in Grosseto from 11–16 June.

== Medalists ==
Event	Gold		Silver		Bronze	
T11	Xavier Porras; Spain	6.14 CR	Martin Parejo Maza; Spain	6.05 SB	Andrei Koptev; Russia	5.65
T12	Per Jonsson; Sweden	6.95 CR	Tobias Jonsson; Sweden	6.69 PB	Siarhei Burdukou; Belarus	6.57
T13	Iván José Cano Blanco; Spain	7.09 CR=	Radoslav Zlatanov; Bulgaria	6.72 SB	Ihar Fartunau; Belarus	6.61 SB
T20	Zoran Talic; Croatia	7.36 CR	Mariusz Pietrucha; Poland	6.59 SB	Lenine Cunha; Portugal	6.56
T36	Evgenii Torsunov; Russia	5.93 WR	Marcin Mielczarek; Poland	5.35 PB	Mariusz Sobczak; Poland	5.18
T37	Chermen Kobesov; Russia	6.15 CR	Vladislav Barinov; Russia	5.82 SB	Valentin Bertrand; France	5.70 PB
T38	Andrei Poroshin; Russia	5.72	Moussa Tambadou; France	5.43	Joshua Howard; United Kingdom	5.41
T42	Daniel Jorgensen; Denmark	6.70 WR	Heinrich Popow; Germany	6.43 PB	Diias Izbasarov; Russia	5.78
T44	Markus Rehm; Germany	7.98 CR	Felix Streng; Germany	6.90	Jean-Baptiste Alaize; France	6.67 PB
T47	Christos Koutoulias; Greece	6.63 SB	Mihail Hristov (F46); Bulgaria	6.54 SB	Aliaksandr Subota (F46); Belarus	6.35
WR world record | AR area record | CR championship record | GR games record | NR national record | OR Olympic record | PB personal best | SB season best | WL world leading (in a given season)

== See also ==
- List of IPC world records in athletics
