= 2012 IPC Athletics European Championships – Men's 100 metres =

The men's 100 metres at the 2012 IPC Athletics European Championships was held at Stadskanaal Stadium from 24–28 July.

== Medalists ==
Results given by IPC Athletics.

Class	Gold	Silver	Bronze
T11	Elchin Muradov; Azerbaijan	Firmino Baptista; Portugal	Martin Parejo Maza; Spain
T12	Mateusz Michalski; Poland	Fedor Trikolich; Russia	Jerzy Wierzbicki; Poland
T13	Joan Munar Martinez; Spain	Philipp Handler; Switzerland	Radoslav Zlatanov; Bulgaria
T34	Stefan Rusch; Netherlands	Henk Schuiling; Netherlands	Bart Pijs; Netherlands
T35	Ivan Otleykin; Russia	Andrey Antipov; Russia	Iurii Tsaruk; Ukraine
T36	Evgenii Shvetcov; Russia	Roman Pavlyk; Ukraine	Graeme Ballard; United Kingdom
T37	Roman Kapranov; Russia	Jelmar Bos; Netherlands	Alexandr Lyashchenko; Russia
T38	Mykyta Senyk; Ukraine	Lorenzo Albaladejo Martinez; Spain	Patrik Wurm; Czech Republic
T42	Heinrich Popow; Germany	Daniel Jorgensen; Denmark	Richard Whitehead; United Kingdom
T44	Markus Rehm; Germany	Christoph Bausch; Switzerland	Riccardo Scendoni; Italy
T46	Yury Nosulenko; Russia	Antonis Aresti; Cyprus	Andrej Ekholm; Sweden
T54	Leo-Pekka Tähti; Finland	Kenny van Weeghel; Netherlands	Marc Schuh; Germany

== Results ==
=== T11 ===
Heats

Rank	Heat	Sport Class	Name	Nationality	Time	Notes
1	1	T11	Elchin Muradov	Azerbaijan	11.52	Q,
2	1	T11	Firmino Baptista	Portugal	11.77	q, SB
3	2	T11	Timothee Adolphe	France	12.32	Q
4	2	T11	Martin Parejo Maza	Spain	12.36	q
5	1	T11	Rickard Straht	Sweden	12.47	

Final

Rank	Sport Class	Name	Nationality	Time	Notes
1st place, gold medalist(s)	T11	Elchin Muradov	Azerbaijan	11.49	
2nd place, silver medalist(s)	T11	Firmino Baptista	Portugal	11.71	SB
3rd place, bronze medalist(s)	T11	Martin Parejo Maza	Spain	12.22	SB
4	T11	Timothee Adolphe	France	12.52	

=== T12 ===
Heats

Rank	Heat	Sport Class	Name	Nationality	Time	Notes
1	2	T12	Mateusz Michalski	Poland	11.00	Q
2	1	T12	Fedor Trikolich	Russia	11.23	Q
3	2	T12	Gabriel Potra	Portugal	11.56	q
4	1	T12	Jerzy Wierzbicki	Poland	11.58	q
5	2	T12	Mustafa Kucuk	Turkey	11.66	SB
6	1	T12	Daniel Ayora Estevan	Spain	11.85	SB
7	1	T12	Suat Oner	Turkey	11.86	
—	2	T12	Maximiliano Rodriguez	Spain	DNS	

Final

Rank	Sport Class	Name	Nationality	Time	Notes
1st place, gold medalist(s)	T12	Mateusz Michalski	Poland	10.85	SB
2nd place, silver medalist(s)	T12	Fedor Trikolich	Russia	10.95	SB
3rd place, bronze medalist(s)	T12	Jerzy Wierzbicki	Poland	11.49	
4	T12	Gabriel Potra	Portugal	11.63	

=== T13 ===
Final

Rank	Sport Class	Name	Nationality	Time	Notes
1st place, gold medalist(s)	T13	Joan Munar Martinez	Spain	11.15	
2nd place, silver medalist(s)	T13	Philipp Handler	Switzerland	11.19	
3rd place, bronze medalist(s)	T13	Radoslav Zlatanov	Bulgaria	11.20	
4	T13	Ivan Stoev	Bulgaria	11.78	
5	T13	Tobias Jonsson	Sweden	11.88	
6	T13	Siarhei Hareshniakou	Belarus	11.90	
7	T13	Hugo Cavaco	Portugal	11.92	

=== T34 ===
Final

Rank	Sport Class	Name	Nationality	Time	Notes
1st place, gold medalist(s)	T34	Stefan Rusch	Netherlands	17.41	
2nd place, silver medalist(s)	T34	Henk Schuiling	Netherlands	17.62	
3rd place, bronze medalist(s)	T34	Bart Pijs	Netherlands	18.12	
4	T34	Janne Seppala	Finland	18.60	

=== T35 ===
Final

Rank	Sport Class	Name	Nationality	Time	Notes
1st place, gold medalist(s)	T35	Ivan Otleykin	Russia	13.89	
2nd place, silver medalist(s)	T35	Andrey Antipov	Russia	13.97	SB
3rd place, bronze medalist(s)	T35	Iurii Tsaruk	Ukraine	14.02	SB
4	T35	Kevin De Loght	Belgium	14.29	SB
5	T35	Piotr Radosz	Poland	15.00	

=== T36 ===
Heats

Rank	Heat	Sport Class	Name	Nationality	Time	Notes
1	1	T36	Evgenii Shvetcov	Russia	12.20	Q
2	1	T36	Roman Pavlyk	Ukraine	12.51	Q
3	1	T36	Ben Rushgrove	United Kingdom	12.52	Q
4	2	T36	Graeme Ballard	United Kingdom	12.66	Q
5	1	T36	Marcin Mielczarek	Poland	12.78	q
6	2	T36	Andrey Zhirnov	Russia	12.86	Q
7	2	T36	Anastasios Petropoulos	Greece	13.52	Q
8	1	T36	Marian Petria	Romania	15.11	q
9	2	T36	Jonathan Robert	France	15.85	

Final

Rank	Sport Class	Name	Nationality	Time	Notes
1st place, gold medalist(s)	T0	Evgenii Shvetcov	Russia	12.16	
2nd place, silver medalist(s)	T0	Roman Pavlyk	Ukraine	12.44	
3rd place, bronze medalist(s)	T0	Graeme Ballard	United Kingdom	12.49	
4	T0	Ben Rushgrove	United Kingdom	12.54	
5	T0	Marcin Mielczarek	Poland	12.93	
6	T0	Andrey Zhirnov	Russia	13.03	
7	T0	Anastasios Petropoulos	Greece	13.67	
8	T0	Marian Petria	Romania	15.01	

=== T37 ===
Final

Rank	Sport Class	Name	Nationality	Time	Notes
1st place, gold medalist(s)	T37	Roman Kapranov	Russia	11.93	
2nd place, silver medalist(s)	T37	Jelmar Bos	Netherlands	12.15	
3rd place, bronze medalist(s)	T37	Alexandr Lyashchenko	Russia	12.29	
4	T37	Andreas Pasantas	Cyprus	13.07	SB
5	T37	Patryk Kolasinski	Poland	13.23	
—	T37	Gocha Khugaev	Russia	DQ	
—	T37	Pere Pascual Valls	Spain	DQ	

=== T38 ===
Final

Rank	Sport Class	Name	Nationality	Time	Notes
1st place, gold medalist(s)	T38	Mykyta Senyk	Ukraine	11.47	SB
2nd place, silver medalist(s)	T38	Lorenzo Albaladejo Martinez	Spain	11.84	
3rd place, bronze medalist(s)	T38	Patrik Wurm	Czech Republic	11.98	SB
4	T38	Aliaksandr Pankou	Belarus	12.26	SB
5	T38	Moussa Tambadou	France	12.41	SB
6	T38	Demetres Sophokleous	Cyprus	14.30	

=== T42 ===
Final

Rank	Sport Class	Name	Nationality	Time	Notes
1st place, gold medalist(s)	T42	Heinrich Popow	Germany	12.66	
2nd place, silver medalist(s)	T42	Daniel Jørgensen	Denmark	12.81	
3rd place, bronze medalist(s)	T42	Richard Whitehead	United Kingdom	13.07	
4	T42	Helgi Sveinsson	Iceland	14.41	

=== T44 ===
Final

Rank	Sport Class	Name	Nationality	Time	Notes
1st place, gold medalist(s)	T44	Markus Rehm	Germany	11.70	
2nd place, silver medalist(s)	T44	Christoph Bausch	Switzerland	11.85	
3rd place, bronze medalist(s)	T44	Riccardo Scendoni	Italy	11.86	
4	T43	Ivan Prokopyev	Russia	11.99	
5	T44	Ronald Hertog	Netherlands	12.15	
—	T43	David Behre	Germany	DNS	

=== T46 ===
Final

Rank	Sport Class	Name	Nationality	Time	Notes
1st place, gold medalist(s)	T46	Yury Nosulenko	Russia	11.32	
2nd place, silver medalist(s)	T46	Antonis Aresti	Cyprus	11.36	
3rd place, bronze medalist(s)	T45	Andrej Ekholm	Sweden	11.57	ER
4	T45	Mihail Hristov	Bulgaria	12.10	

=== T51/53 ===
Final

(Non-medal event)

Rank	Sport Class	Name	Nationality	Time	Notes
1	T53	Edison Kasumaj	Switzerland	16.40	
2	T53	Sergey Shilov	Russia	16.78	

=== T54 ===
Final

Rank	Sport Class	Name	Nationality	Time	Notes
1st place, gold medalist(s)	T54	Leo Pekka Tahti	Finland	14.21	
2nd place, silver medalist(s)	T54	Kenny van Weeghel	Netherlands	14.47	
3rd place, bronze medalist(s)	T54	Marc Schuh	Germany	14.95	
4	T54	Esa-Pekka Mattila	Finland	15.21	
5	T54	Alexey Bychenok	Russia	15.29	
6	T54	Niklas Almers	Sweden	15.41	

== See also ==
- List of IPC world records in athletics
