= 2014 IPC Athletics European Championships – Men's 200 metres =

The men's 200 metres at the 2014 IPC Athletics European Championships was held at the Swansea University Stadium from 18–23 August.

== Medalists ==
Event	Gold		Silver		Bronze	
T11	Timothée Adolphe; France	23.90	Gerard Descarrega Puigdevall; Spain	23.91	Andrey Koptev; Russia	24.05
T12	Jason Smyth; Ireland	21.67	Joan Munar Martinez; Spain	22.28	Artem Loginov; Russia	22.55
T13	Alexander Zverev; Russia	23.05	Mateusz Michalski; Poland	23.20	Alexey Labzin; Russia	23.26
T34	Henry Manni; Finland	30.47	Sebastien Mobre; France	31.04	Bojan Mitic; Switzerland	31.35
T35	Dmitrii Safronov; Russia	25.86	Iurii Tsaruk; Ukraine	26.18	Jordan Howe; United Kingdom	28.73
T36	Evgenii Shvetcov; Russia	25.34	Graeme Ballard; United Kingdom	26.04	Roman Pavlyk; Ukraine	28.09
T37	Andrey Vdovin; Russia	23.23	Chermen Kobesov; Russia	23.40	Andriy Onufriyenko; Ukraine	24.62
T38	Mykyta Senyk; Ukraine	23.99	Lorenzo Albaladejo Martinez; Spain	24.42	—N/a	
T44	Felix Streng (T44); Germany	22.93	David Behre (T43); Germany	23.36	Ronald Hertog (T44); Netherlands	23.39
T47	Michal Derus; Poland	22.47	Alexey Kotlov; Russia	22.86	Vadim Trunov; Russia	23.00
T53	Pierre Fairbank; France	28.72	Mickey Bushell; United Kingdom	29.20	Arnar Helgi Larusson; Iceland	39.08
T54	Kenny van Weeghel; Netherlands	25.73	Leo Pekka Tahti; Finland	26.07	Marc Schuh; Germany	26.48

== Results ==
=== T11 ===
Semifinals

Rank	Heat	Sport Class	Name	Nationality	Time	Notes
1	2	T11	Gerard Desgarrega Puigdevall	Spain	23.62	Q, SB
2	2	T11	Timothée Adolphe	France	23.69	q
3	2	T11	Andrey Koptev	Russia	23.95	q
4	1	T11	Gauthier Tresor Makunda	France	23.98	Q
5	1	T11	Firmino Baptista	Portugal	24.07	SB
6	1	T11	Mehmet Tunc	Turkey	24.68	PB

Final

Rank	Sport Class	Name	Nationality	Time	Notes
1st place, gold medalist(s)	T11	Timothée Adolphe	France	23.90	
2nd place, silver medalist(s)	T11	Gerard Desgarrega Puigdevall	Spain	23.91	
3rd place, bronze medalist(s)	T11	Andrey Koptev	Russia	24.05	
4	T11	Gauthier Tresor Makunda	France	24.30	

=== T12 ===
Semifinals

Rank	Heat	Sport Class	Name	Nationality	Time	Notes
1	2	T12	Jason Smyth	Ireland	22.34	Q
2	2	T12	Joan Munar Martinez	Spain	22.58	q
3	2	T12	Elmir Jabrayilov	Azerbaijan	23.68	
4	1	T12	Artem Loginov	Russia	22.71	Q
5	1	T12	Fedor Trikolich	Russia	22.90	q
6	1	T12	Luis Goncalves	Portugal	23.39	
7	1	T12	Thomas Ulbricht	Germany	23.47	SB
8	2	T12	Andrei Kuzmin	Russia	24.11	

Final

Rank	Sport Class	Name	Nationality	Time	Notes
1st place, gold medalist(s)	T12	Jason Smyth	Ireland	21.67	
2nd place, silver medalist(s)	T12	Joan Munar Martinez	Spain	22.28	PB
3rd place, bronze medalist(s)	T12	Artem Loginov	Russia	22.55	
4	T12	Fedor Trikolich	Russia	22.90	

=== T13 ===
Semifinals

Rank	Heat	Sport Class	Name	Nationality	Time	Notes
1	1	T13	Alexey Orekhov	Russia	22.88	Q, PB
2	2	T13	Alexander Zverev	Russia	23.35	Q
3	1	T13	Mateusz Michalski	Poland	23.41	Q
4	1	T13	Tobias Jonsson	Sweden	23.67	Q
5	2	T13	Philipp Handler	Switzerland	24.20	Q
6	1	T13	Vlaydslav Hrebenyk	Ukraine	24.21	q
7	2	T13	Alexey Labzin	Russia	24.23	Q
8	2	T13	Daniel Wozniak	Poland	24.39	q
9	2	T13	Mustafa Kucuk	Turkey	24.53	SB
10	1	T13	Vegard Dragsund Nilsen	Norway	24.71	
11	2	T13	Diego Sancho Villanueva	Spain	24.73	
12	1	T13	Rodolfo Alves	Portugal	25.29	

Final

Rank	Sport Class	Name	Nationality	Time	Notes
1st place, gold medalist(s)	T13	Alexander Zverev	Russia	23.05	
2nd place, silver medalist(s)	T13	Mateusz Michalski	Poland	23.20	
3rd place, bronze medalist(s)	T13	Alexey Labzin	Russia	23.26	
4	T13	Alexey Orekhov	Russia	23.34	
5	T13	Philipp Handler	Switzerland	23.86	
6	T13	Tobias Jonsson	Sweden	23.95	
7	T13	Daniel Wozniak	Poland	24.43	
—	T13	Vladyslav Hrebenyk	Ukraine	DNF	

=== T34 ===
Final

Rank	Sport Class	Name	Nationality	Time	Notes
1st place, gold medalist(s)	T34	Henry Manni	Finland	30.47	
2nd place, silver medalist(s)	T34	Sebastien Mobre	France	31.04	
3rd place, bronze medalist(s)	T34	Bojan Mitic	Switzerland	31.35	
4	T34	Stefan Rusch	Netherlands	31.41	
5	T34	Tuomas Manni	Finland	31.68	
6	T34	Isaac Towers	United Kingdom	32.54	
7	T34	Henk Schuiling	Netherlands	37.42	
—	T34	Bart Pijs	Netherlands	DQ	

=== T35 ===
Final

Rank	Sport Class	Name	Nationality	Time	Notes
1st place, gold medalist(s)	T35	Dmitrii Safronov	Russia	25.86	SB
2nd place, silver medalist(s)	T35	Iurii Tsaruk	Ukraine	26.18	
3rd place, bronze medalist(s)	T35	Jordan Howe	United Kingdom	28.73	
4	T35	Niels Stein	Germany	29.24	
5	T35	Kevin de Loght	Belgium	30.25	SB

=== T36 ===
Final

Rank	Sport Class	Name	Nationality	Time	Notes
1st place, gold medalist(s)	T36	Evgenii Shvetcov	Russia	25.34	
2nd place, silver medalist(s)	T36	Graeme Ballard	United Kingdom	26.04	
3rd place, bronze medalist(s)	T36	Roman Pavlyk	Ukraine	26.09	
4	T36	Mikhail Bondarenko	Russia	28.98	
5	T36	Loukas Ioannis Protonotarios	Greece	29.31	SB

=== T37 ===
Final

Rank	Sport Class	Name	Nationality	Time	Notes
1st place, gold medalist(s)	T37	Andrey Vdovin	Russia	23.23	SB
2nd place, silver medalist(s)	T37	Chermin Kobesov	Russia	23.40	PB
3rd place, bronze medalist(s)	T37	Andriy Onufriyenko	Ukraine	24.62	
4	T37	Rhys Jones	United Kingdom	24.96	SB
5	T37	Jelmar Bos	Netherlands	25.44	
—	T37	Iasonas Gantes	Greece	DNF	

=== T38 ===
Final

Rank	Sport Class	Name	Nationality	Time	Notes
1st place, gold medalist(s)	T38	Mykyta Senyk	Ukraine	23.99	
2nd place, silver medalist(s)	T38	Lorenzo Albaladejo Martinez	Spain	24.42	
3	T38	Bradley Lee Wigley	United Kingdom	25.70	

=== T42 ===
Final

Rank	Sport Class	Name	Nationality	Time	Notes
1st place, gold medalist(s)	T42	Anton Prokhorov	Russia	26.48	PB
2nd place, silver medalist(s)	T42	Richard Whitehead	United Kingdom	27.25	
3rd place, bronze medalist(s)	T42	Daniel Jorgensen	Denmark	27.90	
4	T42	Clavel Kayitare	France	28.17	
5	T42	Mindaugas Bernotas	Lithuania	28.30	SB

=== T44 ===
Final

Rank	Sport Class	Name	Nationality	Time	Notes
1st place, gold medalist(s)	T44	Felix Streng	Germany	22.93	
2nd place, silver medalist(s)	T43	David Behre	Germany	23.36	
3rd place, bronze medalist(s)	T44	Ronald Hertog	Netherlands	23.39	SB
4	T44	Ivan Prokopyev	Russia	24.86	
5	T44	Emanuele di Marino	Italy	25.12	SB
6	T44	Jean-Baptiste Alaize	France	26.29	

=== T47 ===
Final

Rank	Sport Class	Name	Nationality	Time	Notes
1st place, gold medalist(s)	T47	Michal Derus	Poland	22.47	
2nd place, silver medalist(s)	T47	Alexey Kotlov	Russia	22.86	PB
3rd place, bronze medalist(s)	T47	Vadim Trunov	Russia	23.00	SB
4	T47	Ola Abidogun	United Kingdom	23.45	SB
5	T46	Cahit Kilicaslan	Turkey	27.05	
—	T47	Maciej Kesicki	Poland	DNF	

=== T53 ===
Final

Rank	Sport Class	Name	Nationality	Time	Notes
1st place, gold medalist(s)	T53	Pierre Fairbank	France	28.72	
2nd place, silver medalist(s)	T53	Mickey Bushell	United Kingdom	29.20	
3rd place, bronze medalist(s)	T53	Amar Helgi Larusson	Iceland	39.08	
—	T53	Ivan Carmelo Messina	Italy	DQ	
—	T53	Nicolas Brignone	France	DQ	

=== T54 ===
Final

Rank	Sport Class	Name	Nationality	Time	Notes
1st place, gold medalist(s)	T54	Kenny van Weeghel	Netherlands	25.73	
2nd place, silver medalist(s)	T54	Leo Pekka Tahti	Finland	26.07	
3rd place, bronze medalist(s)	T54	Marc Schuh	Germany	26.48	
4	T54	Niklas Almers	Sweden	27.23	
5	T54	Alex Adelaide	France	28.00	
6	T54	Esa-Pekka Mattila	Finland	28.57	

== See also ==
- List of IPC world records in athletics
