= 2012 IPC Athletics European Championships – Men's 200 metres =

The men's 200 metres at the 2012 IPC Athletics European Championships was held at Stadskanaal Stadium from 24–28 July.

== Medalists ==
Results given by IPC Athletics.

Class	Gold	Silver	Bronze
T12	Luis Goncalves; Portugal	Fedor Trikolich; Russia	Gerard Descarrega Puigdevall; Spain
T13	Joan Munar Martinez; Spain	Radoslav Zlatanov; Bulgaria	Philipp Handler; Switzerland
T34	Stefan Rusch; Netherlands	Henk Schuiling; Netherlands	Bart Pijs; Netherlands
T35	Iurii Tsaruk; Ukraine	Ivan Otleykin; Russia	Kevin De Loght; Belgium
T36	Roman Pavlyk; Ukraine	Graeme Ballard; United Kingdom	Ben Rushgrove; United Kingdom
T37	Gocha Khugaev; Russia	Roman Kapranov; Russia	Alexandr Lyashchenko; Russia
T38	Mykyta Senyk; Ukraine	Lorenzo Albaladejo Martinez; Spain	Andriy Onufriyenko; Ukraine
T42	Richard Whitehead; United Kingdom	Daniel Jorgensen; Denmark	N/A
T44	Riccardo Scendoni; Italy	David Behre; Germany	Ivan Prokopyev; Russia
T46	Antonis Aresti; Cyprus	Yury Nosulenko; Russia	Samuele Gobbi; Italy
T53	Edison Kasumaj; Switzerland	Sergey Shilov; Russia	N/A

== Results ==
=== T11 ===
Final

(Non-medal event)

Rank	Sport Class	Name	Nationality	Time	Notes
1	T11	Elchin Muradov	Azerbaijan	23.46	
2	T11	Firmino Baptista	Portugal	23.78	

=== T12 ===
Heats

Rank	Heat	Sport Class	Name	Nationality	Time	Notes
1	4	T12	Luis Goncalves	Portugal	23.14	Q
2	2	T12	Gerard Desgarrega Puigdevall	Spain	23.49	Q
3	4	T12	Mustafa Kucuk	Turkey	23.76	q
4	2	T12	Gabriel Potra	Portugal	23.78	q
5	1	T12	Fedor Trikolich	Russia	23.90	Q
6	3	T12	Rodolfo Alves	Portugal	23.95	Q
7	3	T12	Sefa Telli	Turkey	24.40	
—	4	T12	Suat Oner	Turkey	DQ	
—	2	T12	Mateusz Michalski	Poland	DNS	
—	1	T12	Jerzy Wierzbicki	Poland	DNS	

Semifinals

Rank	Heat	Sport Class	Name	Nationality	Time	Notes
1	1	T12	Fedor Trikolich	Russia	22.83	Q, SB
2	2	T12	Luis Goncalves	Portugal	23.06	Q
3	1	T12	Gerard Desgarrega Puigdevall	Spain	23.51	q
4	2	T12	Mustafa Kucuk	Turkey	23.71	SB
5	1	T12	Gabriel Potra	Portugal	23.83	
6	2	T12	Rodolfo Alves	Portugal	23.92	

Final

Rank	Sport Class	Name	Nationality	Time	Notes
1st place, gold medalist(s)	T12	Luis Goncalves	Portugal	22.67	
2nd place, silver medalist(s)	T12	Fedor Trikolich	Russia	22.68	SB
3rd place, bronze medalist(s)	T12	Gerard Desgarrega Puigdevall	Spain	23.86	

=== T13 ===
Heats

Rank	Heat	Sport Class	Name	Nationality	Time	Notes
1	2	T13	Joan Munar Martinez	Spain	23.11	Q
2	2	T13	Philipp Handler	Switzerland	23.37	Q, SB
3	2	T13	Radoslav Zlatanov	Bulgaria	23.70	q
4	1	T13	Hugo Cavaco	Portugal	23.87	Q SB
5	1	T13	Ivan Stoev	Bulgaria	24.25	Q
6	2	T13	Tobias Jonsson	Sweden	24.33	q
—	2	T13	Abdullah Yakin	Turkey	DQ	
—	1	T13	Siarhei Hareshniakou	Belarus	DQ	
—	1	T13	Per Jonsson	Sweden	DNS	

Final

Rank	Sport Class	Name	Nationality	Time	Notes
1st place, gold medalist(s)	T13	Joan Munar Martinez	Spain	0.00	
2nd place, silver medalist(s)	T13	Radoslav Zlatanov	Bulgaria	0.00	SB
3rd place, bronze medalist(s)	T13	Philipp Handler	Switzerland	0.00	
4	T13	Ivan Stoev	Bulgaria	0.00	
5	T13	Tobias Jonsson	Sweden	0.00	
—	T13	Hugo Cavaco	Portugal	DQ	

=== T34 ===
Final

Rank	Sport Class	Name	Nationality	Time	Notes
1st place, gold medalist(s)	T34	Stefan Rusch	Netherlands	31.87	
2nd place, silver medalist(s)	T34	Henk Schuiling	Netherlands	32.87	SB
3rd place, bronze medalist(s)	T34	Bart Pijs	Netherlands	33.77	
4	T34	Janne Seppala	Finland	34.72	

=== T35 ===
Final

Rank	Sport Class	Name	Nationality	Time	Notes
1st place, gold medalist(s)	T35	Iurii Tsaruk	Ukraine	27.32	
2nd place, silver medalist(s)	T35	Ivan Otleykin	Russia	28.33	
3rd place, bronze medalist(s)	T35	Kevin De Loght	Belgium	28.47	
4	T35	Andrey Antipov	Russia	28.89	
5	T35	Piotr Radosz	Poland	30.58	

=== T36 ===
Final

Rank	Sport Class	Name	Nationality	Time	Notes
1st place, gold medalist(s)	T36	Roman Pavlyk	Ukraine	24.98	SB
2nd place, silver medalist(s)	T36	Graeme Ballard	United Kingdom	25.19	SB
3rd place, bronze medalist(s)	T36	Ben Rushgrove	United Kingdom	25.25	SB
4	T36	Andrey Zhirnov	Russia	25.72	SB
5	T36	Marian Petria	Romania	31.02	
—	T36	Marcin Mielczarek	Poland	DNF	

=== T37 ===
Final

Rank	Sport Class	Name	Nationality	Time	Notes
1st place, gold medalist(s)	T37	Gocha Khugaev	Russia	23.54	ER
2nd place, silver medalist(s)	T37	Roman Kapranov	Russia	24.09	
3rd place, bronze medalist(s)	T37	Alexandr Lyashchenko	Russia	24.40	SB
4	T37	Jelmar Bos	Netherlands	25.67	
5	T37	Andreas Pasantas	Cyprus	27.70	
—	T37	Oleksandr Driha	Ukraine	DQ	

=== T38 ===
Final

Rank	Sport Class	Name	Nationality	Time	Notes
1st place, gold medalist(s)	T38	Mykyta Senyk	Ukraine	23.61	SB
2nd place, silver medalist(s)	T38	Lorenzo Albaladejo Martinez	Spain	24.30	
3rd place, bronze medalist(s)	T38	Andriy Onufriyenko	Ukraine	24.54	
4	T38	Aliaksandr Pankou	Belarus	24.68	
5	T38	Moussa Tambadou	France	25.15	SB
6	T38	Demetres Sophokleous	Cyprus	30.58	

=== T42 ===
Final

Rank	Sport Class	Name	Nationality	Time	Notes
1st place, gold medalist(s)	T42	Richard Whitehead	United Kingdom	24.93	WR
2nd place, silver medalist(s)	T42	Daniel Jorgensen	Denmark	26.73	SB
3rd place, bronze medalist(s)	T42	Helgi Sveinsson	Iceland	38.96	

=== T44 ===
Final

Rank	Sport Class	Name	Nationality	Time	Notes
1st place, gold medalist(s)	T44	Riccardo Scendoni	Italy	24.07	SB
2nd place, silver medalist(s)	T43	David Behre	Germany	24.44	
3rd place, bronze medalist(s)	T43	Ivan Prokopyev	Russia	24.95	
—	T44	Christoph Bausch	Switzerland	DQ	

=== T46 ===
Final

Rank	Sport Class	Name	Nationality	Time	Notes
1st place, gold medalist(s)	T46	Antonis Aresti	Cyprus	22.58	
2nd place, silver medalist(s)	T46	Yury Nosulenko	Russia	22.85	SB
3rd place, bronze medalist(s)	T46	Samuele Gobbi	Italy	23.68	
4	T45	Andrej Ekholm	Sweden	23.93	ER
5	T46	Florin Marius Cojoc	Romania	25.12	

=== T53 ===
Rank	Sport Class	Name	Nationality	Time	Notes
1st place, gold medalist(s)	T53	Edison Kasumaj	Switzerland	29.70	
2nd place, silver medalist(s)	T53	Sergey Shilov	Russia	29.80	
3rd place, bronze medalist(s)	T53	Korsan Vogel	Germany	31.98	

== See also ==
- List of IPC world records in athletics
