= 2012 IPC Athletics European Championships – Men's long jump =

The men's long jump at the 2012 IPC Athletics European Championships was held at Stadskanaal Stadium from 24–29 July.

== Medalists ==
Results given by IPC Athletics.

Class	Gold	Silver	Bronze
F11	Rickard Straht; Sweden	Ruslan Katyshev; Ukraine	Denis Gulin; Russia
F13	Ihar Fartunau; Belarus	Radoslav Zlatanov; Bulgaria	Zulfikar Sure; Turkey
F20	Jose Antonio Exposito Pineiro; Spain	Zoran Talić; Croatia	Lenine Cunha; Portugal
F36	Mariusz Sobczak; Poland	Roman Pavlyk; Ukraine	Marcin Mielczarek; Poland
F37/38	Gocha Khugaev; Russia	Andriy Onufriyenko; Ukraine	Vladislav Barinov; Russia
F42/44	Markus Rehm; Germany	Daniel Jorgensen; Denmark	Heinrich Popow; Germany
T46	Florin Marius Cojoc; Romania	David Bravo; Spain	Aliaksandr Subota; Belarus

== Results ==
=== F11 ===
Rank	Class	Athlete	1	2	3	4	5	6	Best	Notes
1st place, gold medalist(s)	F11	Rickard Straht; Sweden	5.89	5.94	5.97	5.90	5.58	X	5.97	SB
2nd place, silver medalist(s)	F11	Rusland Katyshev; Ukraine	5.66	X	5.75	5.75	5.57	5.85	5.85	
3rd place, bronze medalist(s)	F11	Denis Gulin; Russia	X	5.59	5.74	5.48	5.78	5.66	5.78	SB
4	F11	Martin Parejo Maza; Spain	5.46	5.54	5.52	5.36	5.44	5.33	5.54	SB
5	F11	Modestas Grauslys; Lithuania	4.13	5.27	X	5.09	X	5.24	5.27	
6	F11	Lorenzo Ricci; Italy	4.49	5.00	X	5.06	5.06	4.76	5.06	SB

=== F13 ===
Rank	Class	Athlete	1	2	3	4	5	6	Best	Notes
1st place, gold medalist(s)	F13	Ihar Fartunau; Belarus	5.99	6.42	6.38	6.61	6.54	6.67	6.67	
2nd place, silver medalist(s)	F13	Radoslav Zlatanov; Bulgaria	X	X	6.28	4.33	6.23	6.55	6.55	SB
3rd place, bronze medalist(s)	F13	Zulifkar Sure; Turkey	X	X	5.86	5.59	5.41	5.57	5.86	SB
4	F13	Tobias Jonsson; Sweden	5.65	X	X	X	X	5.84	5.84	
5	F13	Aleksandar Stoyanov; Bulgaria	5.53	5.48	5.63	5.70	5.65	5.55	5.70	
6	F13	Umut Tunc; Turkey	5.69	5.59	5.63	5.56	X	X	5.69	SB
7	F13	Ivan Stoev; Bulgaria	4.99	5.40	5.49	5.23	5.16	4.44	5.49	
8	F13	Siarhei Haresniakou; Belarus	5.09	5.39	3.21	5.29	5.22	5.23	5.39	
9	F13	Per Jonsson; Sweden	3.93	X	5.04				5.04	

=== F20 ===
Rank	Class	Athlete	1	2	3	4	5	6	Best	Notes
1st place, gold medalist(s)	F20	Jose Antonio Exposito Pineiro; Spain	6.84	7.11	7.10	7.24	7.25	5.36	7.25	SB
2nd place, silver medalist(s)	F20	Zoran Talic; Croatia	7.02	X	7.00	6.83	6.71	6.81	7.02	SB
3rd place, bronze medalist(s)	F20	Lenine Cunha; Portugal	6.30	X	6.38	6.58	X	6.39	6.58	
4	F20	Sebastian Vogt; Germany	5.71	6.48	6.28	3.80	5.08	6.28	6.48	
5	F20	Dionibel Rodrigues Rodrigues; Spain	6.01	6.06	6.05	6.07	6.07	6.20	SB	
6	F20	Evangelos Kanavos; Greece	6.15	X	6.12	X	X	X	6.15	
7	F20	Bjorn Schouten; Netherlands	5.98	5.96	5.87	5.91	5.79	6.06	6.06	SB
8	F20	Leandro Jansen; Netherlands	5.71	5.79	5.35	5.29	5.68	5.68	5.79	
9	F20	Leonid Ustyuzhanin; Russia	X	5.73	X				5.73	
10	F20	Daniel Royer; France	X	5.69	5.31				5.69	
11	F20	Tiago Duarte; Portugal	5.60	X	5.39				5.60	
12	F20	Jose Luis Chaparro Bueno; Spain	5.56	X	X				5.56	
13	F20	Evgeny Medvedev; Russia	X	X	5.07				5.07	
14	F20	Jacek Kolodziej; Poland	4.11	X	X				4.11	

=== F36 ===
Rank	Class	Athlete	1	2	3	4	5	6	Best	Notes
1st place, gold medalist(s)	F36	Mariusz Sobczak; Poland	4.97	5.41	5.20	5.05	4.88	X	5.41	
2nd place, silver medalist(s)	F36	Roman Pavlyk; Ukraine	5.06	4.86	5.16	5.20	5.22	X	5.22	SB
3rd place, bronze medalist(s)	F36	Marcin Mielczarek; Poland	X	4.86	X	4.96	X	4.80	4.96	
4	F36	Anastasios Petropoulos; Greece	4.85	4.83	4.78	4.80	4.67	4.62	4.85	SB

=== F37/38 ===
Rank	Class	Athlete	1	2	3	4	5	6	Best	Points	Notes
1st place, gold medalist(s)	F37	Gocha Khugaev; Russia	6.14	5.69	X	X	5.66	X	6.14	1008	
2nd place, silver medalist(s)	F38	Andriy Onufriyenko; Ukraine	5.79	5.72	5.64	5.29	5.35	5.53	5.79	931	
3rd place, bronze medalist(s)	F37	Vladislav Barnov; Russia	5.24	5.31	5.62	5.51	5.35	5.33	5.62	924	
4	F37	Dmitrijs Silovs; Latvia	5.08	X	4.94	4.82	5.06	4.96	5.08	787	
5	F37	Baldur Baldursson; Iceland	4.87	4.76	5.04	4.72	5.06	4.92	5.06	781	
6	F37	Pere Pascual Valls; Spain	3.95	X	3.90	3.86	2.85	4.10	4.10	402	

=== F42/44 ===
Rank	Class	Athlete	1	2	3	4	5	6	Best	Points	Notes
1st place, gold medalist(s)	F44	Markus Rehm; Germany	X	6.59	X	6.73	6.65	6.78	6.78	942	
2nd place, silver medalist(s)	F42	Daniel Jorgensen; Denmark	5.54	5.59	5.39	5.87	5.48	5.82	5.87	925	SB
3rd place, bronze medalist(s)	F42	Heinrich Popow; Germany	5.77	X	5.66	5.69	3.65	X	5.77	908	
4	F42	Helgi Sveinsson; Iceland	4.84	5.32	4.78	4.57	5.04	3.50	5.32	810	
5	F44	Ronald Hertog; Netherlands	5.23	5.90	5.92	6.07	6.04	5.80	6.07	723	
6	F44	Urs Kolly; Switzerland	X	X	5.99	5.70	6.03	6.02	6.03	710	

=== F46 ===
Rank	Class	Athlete	1	2	3	4	5	6	Best	Notes
1st place, gold medalist(s)	F46	Florin Marius Cojoc; Romania	6.07	6.18	5.55	5.95	6.17	1.91	6.18	
2nd place, silver medalist(s)	F46	David Bravo; Spain	5.94	X	6.08	5.95	6.13	6.10	6.13	
3rd place, bronze medalist(s)	F46	Aliaksandr Subota; Belarus	5.96	5.99	X	6.09	6.08	5.77	6.09	
4	F45	Mihail Hristov; Bulgaria	5.69	5.73	5.45	5.91	5.71	5.84	5.91	ER
5	F46	Antonio Andujar Arroyo; Spain	X	X	X	X	5.73	5.61	5.73	

== See also ==
- List of IPC world records in athletics
