= 2017 World Para Athletics Championships – Men's 4 × 100 metres relay =

The men's 4 x 100 metres relay at the 2017 World Para Athletics Championships was held at the Olympic Stadium in London from 14 to 23 July.

== Medalists ==
Event	Gold		Silver		Bronze	
T11-T13	China; Di Dongdong; Sun Qichao; Chen Mingyu; Liu Wei	48.56	—		—	
T42-T47	Germany; Tom Malutedi; Léon Schäfer; Markus Rehm; Johannes Floors	42.81	Italy; Emanuele Di Marino; Simone Manigrasso; Riccardo Bagaini; Andrea Lanfri	43.32	Japan; Hajimu Ashida; Keita Sato; Tomoki Tagawa; Mikio Ikeda	44.20
WR world record | AR area record | CR championship record | GR games record | NR national record | OR Olympic record | PB personal best | SB season best | WL world leading (in a given season)

Events listed in pink were contested but no medals were awarded.

== See also ==
- List of IPC world records in athletics
