= Albaladejo (surname) =

Albaladejo is a surname of Spanish origin. Notable people with the surname include:

- Jonathan Albaladejo (born 1982), Puerto Rican professional baseball coach
- Lorenzo Albaladejo (born 1990), Spanish Paralympic athlete
- Miguel Albaladejo (born 1966), Spanish screenwriter and film director
- Pierre Albaladejo (born 1933), French rugby union player
