= Tobi Fawehinmi =

American Paralympic athlete

Personal information
- Born: August 14, 1995 (age 31) Houston, Texas, United States

Sport
- Country: United States
- Sport: Para-athletics
- Disability class: F46, T46
- Events: Long jump; Triple jump
Medal record
Men's para-athletics
Representing United States
World Championships
Gold medal – first place	2017 London	Triple jump T47
Silver medal – second place	2013 Lyon	Long jump T46
Bronze medal – third place	2017 London	Long jump T47
Bronze medal – third place	2019 Dubai	Long jump T47
Parapan American Games
Gold medal – first place	2019 Lima	Long jump T47
Silver medal – second place	2015 Toronto	Long jump T47

Tobi Fawehinmi (born August 14, 1995) is an American Paralympic athlete competing in long jump and triple jump events. He is a gold medalist at the 2017 World Para Athletics Championships held in London, United Kingdom and the 2019 Parapan American Games held in Lima, Peru. He also represented the United States at the Summer Paralympics in 2012, 2016 and 2021.

== Career ==
Fawehinmi attended the University of Texas at Arlington where he competed for the UT Arlington Mavericks track and field team.

In 2012, he represented the United States at the 2012 Summer Paralympics held in London, United Kingdom. He competed in the men's 200 metres T46 event. He also competed in the men's long jump F46 and men's triple jump F46 events. The following year, he won the silver medal in the men's long jump T46 event at the 2013 IPC Athletics World Championships held in Lyon, France.

He also represented the United States at the 2016 Summer Paralympics held in Rio de Janeiro, Brazil. He competed in the men's long jump T47 event. At the 2017 World Para Athletics Championships held in London, United Kingdom, he won the gold medal in the men's triple jump T47 event and the bronze medal in the men's long jump T47 event.

In 2019, he won the bronze medal in the men's long jump T47 event at the 2019 World Para Athletics Championships held in Dubai, United Arab Emirates.

He also competed in the men's long jump T47 event at the 2020 Summer Paralympics in Tokyo, Japan.
