= 2015 German Athletics Championships =

- Dates: 25–26 July 2015
- Host city: Nuremberg, Germany
- Venue: Frankenstadion
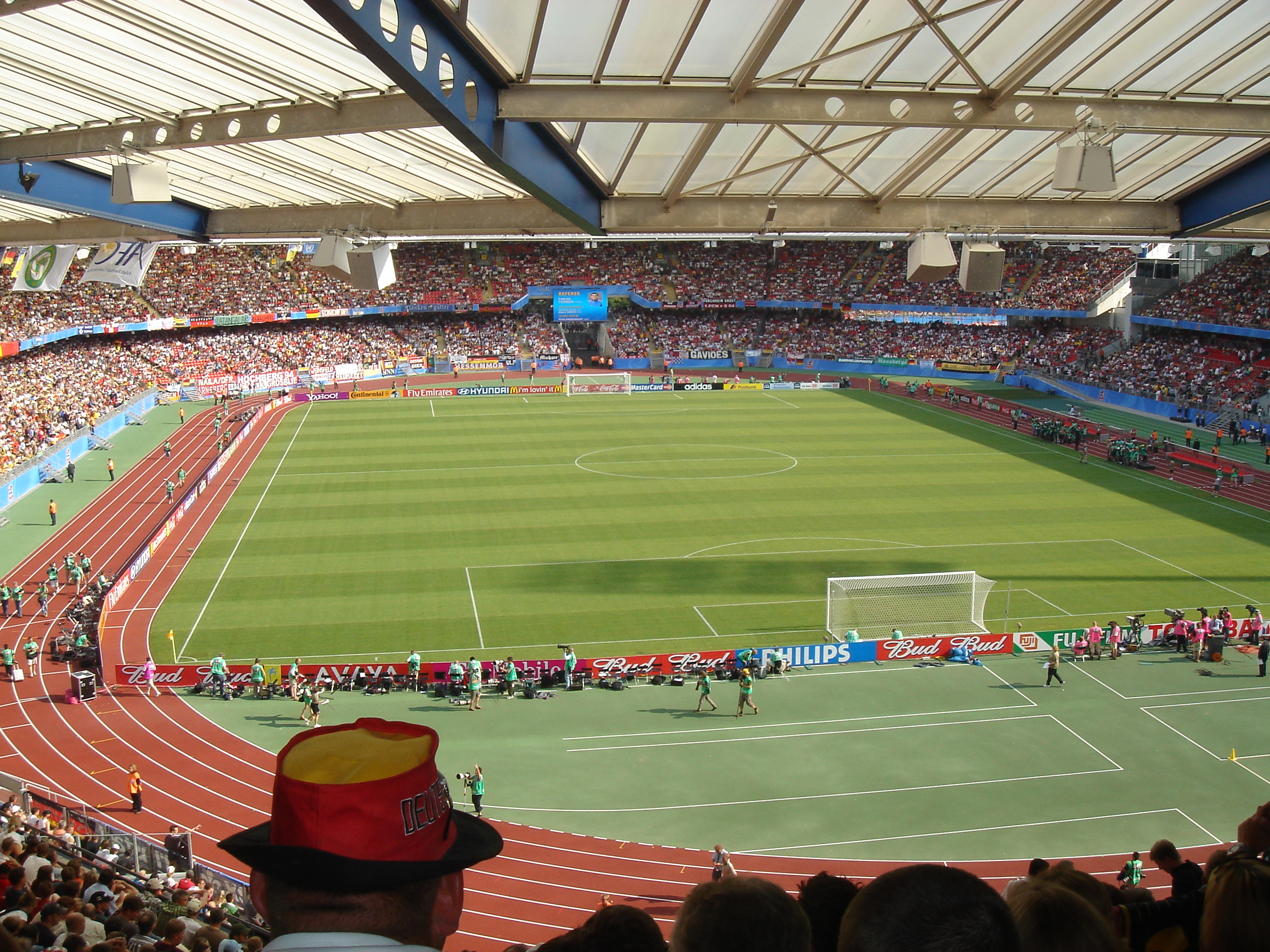

The 2015 German Athletics Championships were held at the Frankenstadion in Nuremberg on 25–26 July 2015.

== Results ==
=== Men ===
Event	Gold		Silver		Bronze		
100 m	Julian Reus	10.12	Aleixo Menga	10.32 =	Robert Hering	10.35	
200 m	Julian Reus	20.42	Robin Erewa	20.73	Robert Hering	20.89	
400 m	Eric Krüger	46.05	Kamghe Gaba	46.32	Jonas Plass	46.34	
800 m	Dennis Krüger	1:48.93	Robin Schembera	1:48.96	Sören Ludolph	1:49.15	
1500 m	Florian Orth	3:44.61	Sebastian Keiner	3:44.62	Marius Probst	3:46.27	
5000 m	Richard Ringer	14:04.05	Clemens Bleistein	14:06.48	Amanal Petros	14:06.88	
110 m hurdles	Gregor Traber	13.32	Matthias Bühler	13.43	Erik Balnuweit	13.58	
400 m hurdles	Jonas Hanßen	49.97	Georg Fleischhauer	50.74	Christian Heimann	50.93	
3000 m steeplechase	Martin Grau	8:41.50	Felix Hentschel	8:46.53	Hannes Liebach	8:51.56	
High jump	David Nopper	2.25 =	Eike Onnen	2.25	Mateusz Przybylko	2.19	
Pole vault	Raphael Holzdeppe	5.94;	Tobias Scherbarth	5.70 =	Carlo Paech	5.60	
Long jump	Fabian Heinle	8.03	Alyn Camara	7.97	Julian Howard	7.81	Markus Rehm: 8.11 (Note: Rehm's distance did not count as his amputee leg prosthetic disqualified him from entering the standings)
Triple jump	Raúl Spank	16.29	Marcel Kornhardt	16.05	Martin Jasper	15.91	
Shot put	David Storl	21.47	Tobias Dahm	19.83	Bodo Göder	19.92	
Discus throw	Christoph Harting	64.06	Martin Wierig	63.55	Markus Münch	61.61	
Hammer throw	Alexander Ziegler	73.91	Markus Esser	72.32	Garland Porter	69.83	
Javelin throw	Thomas Röhler	84.73	Johannes Vetter	83.12	Lars Hamann	81.03	
4 × 100 m relay	Maximilian Ruth; Julian Reus; Alexander Kosenkow; Robin Erewa	39.34	Erik Balnuweit; Martin Keller; Roy Schmidt; Robert Hering	39.42	Lars Hieronymi; Florian Daum; Michael Pohl; Felix Göltl	39.84	
4 × 400 m relay	Oliver Vogel; Till Helbig; Julius Lawnik; Eric Krüger	3:09.65	Benedikt Wiesend; Kamghe Gaba; Markus Kiefl; Johannes Trefz	3:10.38	Sören Gnoss; Maximilian Eichholz; Michel Krempin; Jakob Krempin	3:12.51	

=== Women ===
Event	Gold		Silver		Bronze	
100 m	Verena Sailer	11.20	Rebekka Haase	11.29	Anna-Lena Freese	11.32
200 m	Rebekka Haase	22.95	Anna-Lena Freese	23.08	Cindy Roleder	23.35
400 m	Ruth Spelmeyer	52.41	Laura Müller	52.51	Luisa Valeske	53.95
800 m	Fabienne Kohlmann	1:59.28	Christina Hering	1:59.54	Carolin Walter	2:03.47
1500 m	Maren Kock	4:09.25	Konstanze Klosterhalfen	4:09.58	Hanna Klein	4:09.91
5000 m	Alina Reh	15:51.48	Sabrina Mockenhaupt	16:10.16	Laura Hottentrott	16:14.93
100 m hurdles	Cindy Roleder	13.05	Franziska Hofmann	13.29	Eva Strogies	13.46
400 m hurdles	Jackie Baumann	57.18	Anna Raukuc	58.13	Frederike Hogrebe	58.72
3000 m steeplechase	Gesa Felicitas Krause	9:32.20	Maya Rehberg	9:54.72	Sanaa Koubaa	9:57.01
High jump	Marie-Laurence Jungfleisch	1.95	Katarina Mögenburg	1.84	Imke Onnen	1.84
Pole vault	Lisa Ryzih	4.60	Martina Strutz	4.55	Silke Spiegelburg	4.45
Long jump	Lena Malkus	6.74	Sosthene Moguenara	6.65	Nadja Käther	6.42
Triple jump	Kristin Gierisch	14.38	Jenny Elbe	13.89	Klaudia Kaczmarek	13.24
Shot put	Christina Schwanitz	20.00	Lena Urbaniak	17.28	Denise Hinrichs	17.19
Discus throw	Julia Fischer	65.98	Nadine Müller	65.72	Shanice Craft	64.79
Hammer throw	Betty Heidler	75.34	Kathrin Klaas	67.84	Charlene Woitha	67.03
Javelin throw	Katharina Molitor	65.40	Christina Obergföll	64.11	Linda Stahl	62.57
4 × 100 m relay	Yasmin Kwadwo; Alexandra Burghardt; Ricarda Lobe; Verena Sailer	43.42	Josefina Elsler; Janina Kölsch; Inna Weit; Ina Thimm	45.21	Tanja Heitgen; Christine Salterberg; Friederike Möhlenkamp; Lena Naumann	45.77
4 × 400 m relay	Julia Schaefers; Frederike Hogrebe; Julia Förster; Carolin Walter	3:35.99	Malena Richter; Kim Schmidt; Lena Naumann; Friederike Mählenkamp	3:38.53	Christina Hering; Christine Gess; Martina Riedl; Karoline Pilawa	3:39.36
