= Zoran Talić (athlete) =

Croatian Paralympic athlete

Personal information
- Nationality: Croatian
- Born: 23 June 1990 (age 36) Rijeka, SR Croatia, SFR Yugoslavia
- Height: 182 cm (6 ft 0 in)

Sport
- Country: Croatia
- Sport: Track and field
- Disability class: T20
- Event: Long jump
- Club: AK Dinamo Zrinjevac
- Coached by: Goran Grda (personal)
Medal record
Paralympic athletics
Representing Croatia
Paralympic Games
Silver medal – second place	2016 Rio de Janeiro	Long jump – T20
Silver medal – second place	2012 London	Long jump – T20
IPC World Championships
Silver medal – second place	2013 Lyon	Long jump – T20
Silver medal – second place	2015 Doha	Long jump – T20
Silver medal – second place	2017 London	Long jump – T20
IPC European Championships
Silver medal – second place	2012 Stadskanaal	Long jump – T20
Gold medal – first place	2014 Swansea	Long jump – T20
Gold medal – first place	2016 Grosseto	Long jump – T20

Zoran Talić (born 23 June 1990) is a Paralympic athlete from Croatia who competes in T20 classification long jump events. Talić represented Croatia at the 2012 Summer Paralympics in London, where he won silver in the long jump. He is also a multiple medal winner at both the IPC World and European Championships, and is a two time European champion in his T20 classification.
