= Graeme Ballard =

Paralympic athlete of Great Britain

Personal information
- Nationality: British
- Born: 16 June 1979 (age 47) Manchester, England, Great Britain

Sport
- Country: Great Britain
- Sport: Athletics
Medal record
Track and field (athletics)
Representing United Kingdom
Paralympic Games
Silver medal – second place	2012 London	100 metres – T36
Bronze medal – third place	2004 Athens	200 metres – T36
IPC World Championships
Bronze medal – third place	2013 Lyon	100m – T36
IPC European Championships
Silver medal – second place	2012 Stadskanaal	200m – T36
Silver medal – second place	2014 Swansea	100m – T36
Silver medal – second place	2014 Swansea	200m – T36
Silver medal – second place	2016 Grosseto	100m – T36
Bronze medal – third place	2012 Stadskanaal	100m – T36

Graeme Robert Ballard (born 16 June 1979) is an English Paralympian athlete with cerebral palsy, who competes mainly in category T36 sprint events.

Graeme was born in Manchester. He competed in both the T36 100m and 200m in the 2004 Summer Paralympics in Athens winning the bronze medal in 200m. Four years later, he competed in the 100m, 200m and 400m but won the silver medal in the T36 100m in the 2012 Summer Paralympics. He has also competed for the national 7-a-side football team and competed at a national level in swimming. Graeme has the world record in T36 100m.

He won two silver medals at the 2014 IPC Athletics European Championships in the T36 100m and 200m in Swansea. He finished just ahead of his teammate Paul Blake in the 100m but on both occasions, the Briton was beaten to the gold medal by the Russian Evgenii Shvetcov. Ballard also reached the final of the 400m where he recorded a personal best of 57.18 to finish in fourth place. He placed fifth in the Rio Paralympic games with 12.84 seconds after a false start that disqualified another Ukrainian athlete and a new Paralympic record being set by a Malaysian athlete.
