= Dmytro Prudnikov =

Ukrainian Paralympic athlete

Sport
- Country: Ukraine
- Sport: Para-athletics
- Disability: Intellectual impairment
- Disability class: T20
- Event: Long jump
Medal record
Paralympic Games
Bronze medal – third place	2016 Rio de Janeiro	Long jump T20

Dmytro Prudnikov (Ukrainian: Дмитро Михайлович Прудніков) is a Ukrainian track and field athlete. He won the bronze medal in the men's long jump T20 event at the 2016 Summer Paralympics.

== Career ==
At the 2013 IPC Athletics World Championships he won the gold medal in the men's long jump T20 event.

At the 2014 IPC Athletics European Championships he won the bronze medal in the men's long jump T20 event.

At the 2015 IPC Athletics World Championships he won the bronze medal in the men's long jump T20 event.

At the 2017 World Para Athletics Championships he won the bronze medal in the men's long jump T20 event and the gold medal in the men's triple jump T20 event.

At the 2018 World Para Athletics European Championships he won the silver medal in the men's long jump T20 event.
