= Markus Rehm =

German Paralympic athlete (born 1988)

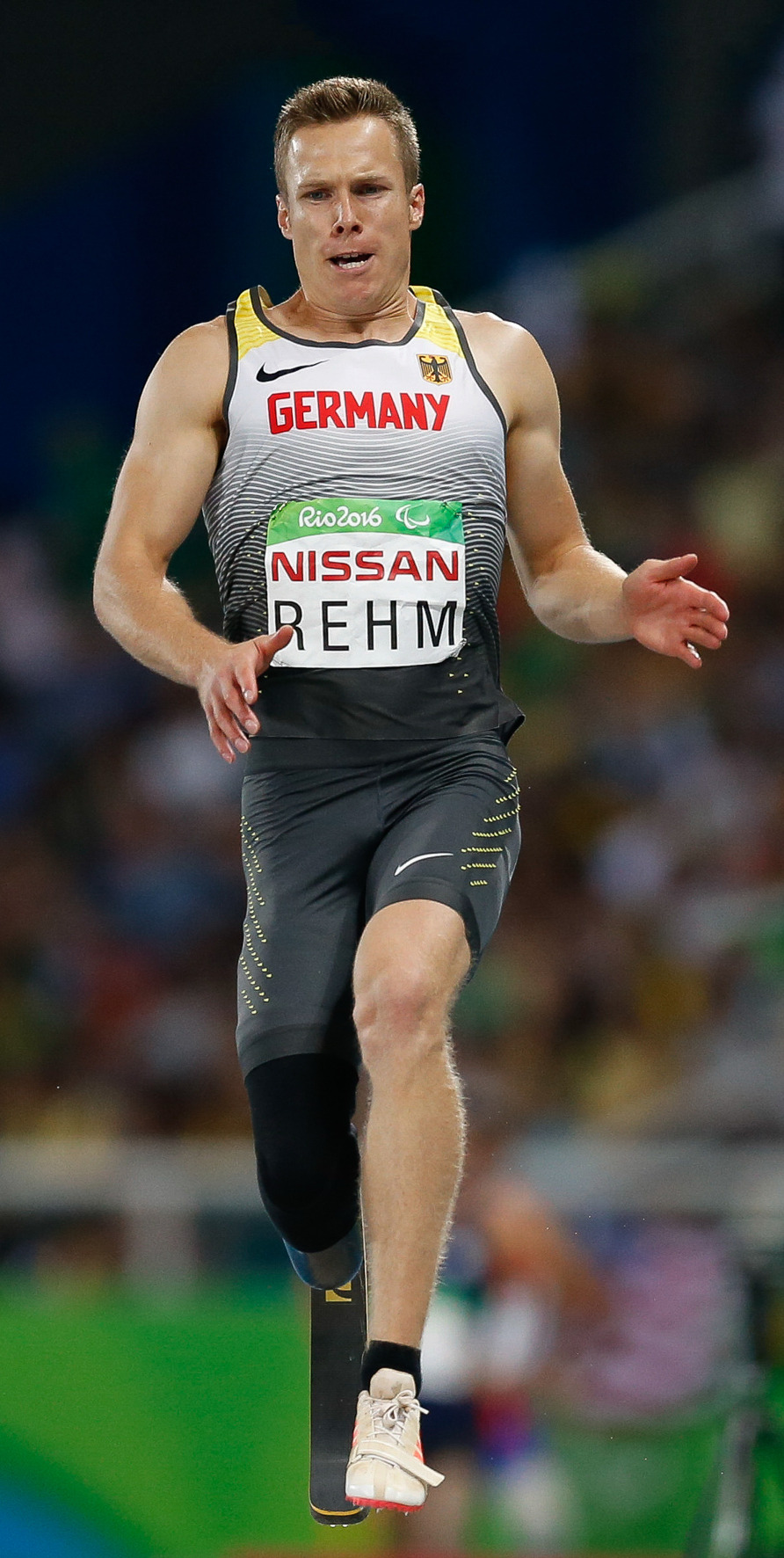
- Rehm at the 2016 Paralympics

Personal information
- Nickname: Blade Jumper
- Born: 22 August 1988 (age 38) Göppingen, West Germany
- Height: 1.85 m (6 ft 1 in)
- Website: www.markus-rehm-88.de

Sport
- Country: Germany
- Sport: Athletics
- Disability class: F44/T44
- Events: Long jump, sprint
- Club: Bayer Leverkusen

Achievements and titles
- Paralympic finals: London 2012, Rio de Janeiro 2016
- Personal best: 8.72 m
Medal record
Representing Germany
Paralympic Games
Gold medal – first place	2012 London	Long jump F44
Gold medal – first place	2016 Rio	Long jump T44
Gold medal – first place	2016 Rio	4 × 100 m T42–47
Gold medal – first place	2020 Tokyo	Long jump T64
Gold medal – first place	2024 Paris	Long jump T64
Bronze medal – third place	2012 London	4 × 100 m T42–46
World Championships
Gold medal – first place	2011 Christchurch	Long jump F44
Gold medal – first place	2013 Lyon	Long jump F44
Gold medal – first place	2015 Doha	Long jump F44
Gold medal – first place	2015 Doha	4 × 100 m T42–47
Gold medal – first place	2017 London	4 × 100 m T42–47
Gold medal – first place	2017 London	Long jump T44
Gold medal – first place	2019 Dubai	Long jump T64
Gold medal – first place	2023 Paris	Long jump T64
Gold medal – first place	2024 Kobe	Long jump T64
Gold medal – first place	2025 New Delhi	Long jump T64
European Championships
Gold medal – first place	2012 Stadskanaal	100 m T44
Gold medal – first place	2012 Stadskanaal	Long jump F42/44
Gold medal – first place	2014 Swansea	Long jump F42/44
Gold medal – first place	2016 Grosseto	Long jump T44
Gold medal – first place	2016 Grosseto	4 × 100 m T42–47
Gold medal – first place	2018 Berlin	Long jump T64
Gold medal – first place	2018 Berlin	4 × 100 m T42–47
Gold medal – first place	2021 Bydgoszcz	Long jump T64
Bronze medal – third place	2014 Swansea	100 m T44

Markus Rehm (born 22 August 1988 in Göppingen, West Germany) is a German Paralympic athlete, and in the long jump has won four Paralympic, six world and five European titles. He began in sports at age 20 and became a long jump F44 world champion in 2011. His club is TSV Bayer 04 Leverkusen and he is a medical specialist. Rehm is nicknamed "The Blade Jumper", as he is a long jumper with a blade-type leg prosthesis. Rehm's right leg was amputated below the knee after a wakeboarding accident. He uses a carbon-fibre bladed prosthesis, from which he jumps off.

He holds the long jump world record in his category at 8.72m set in Rhede, Germany in June 2023, breaking his previous mark of 8.62 m set at the 2021 World Para Athletics European Championships in Bydgoszcz, Poland.

== Athletics career ==
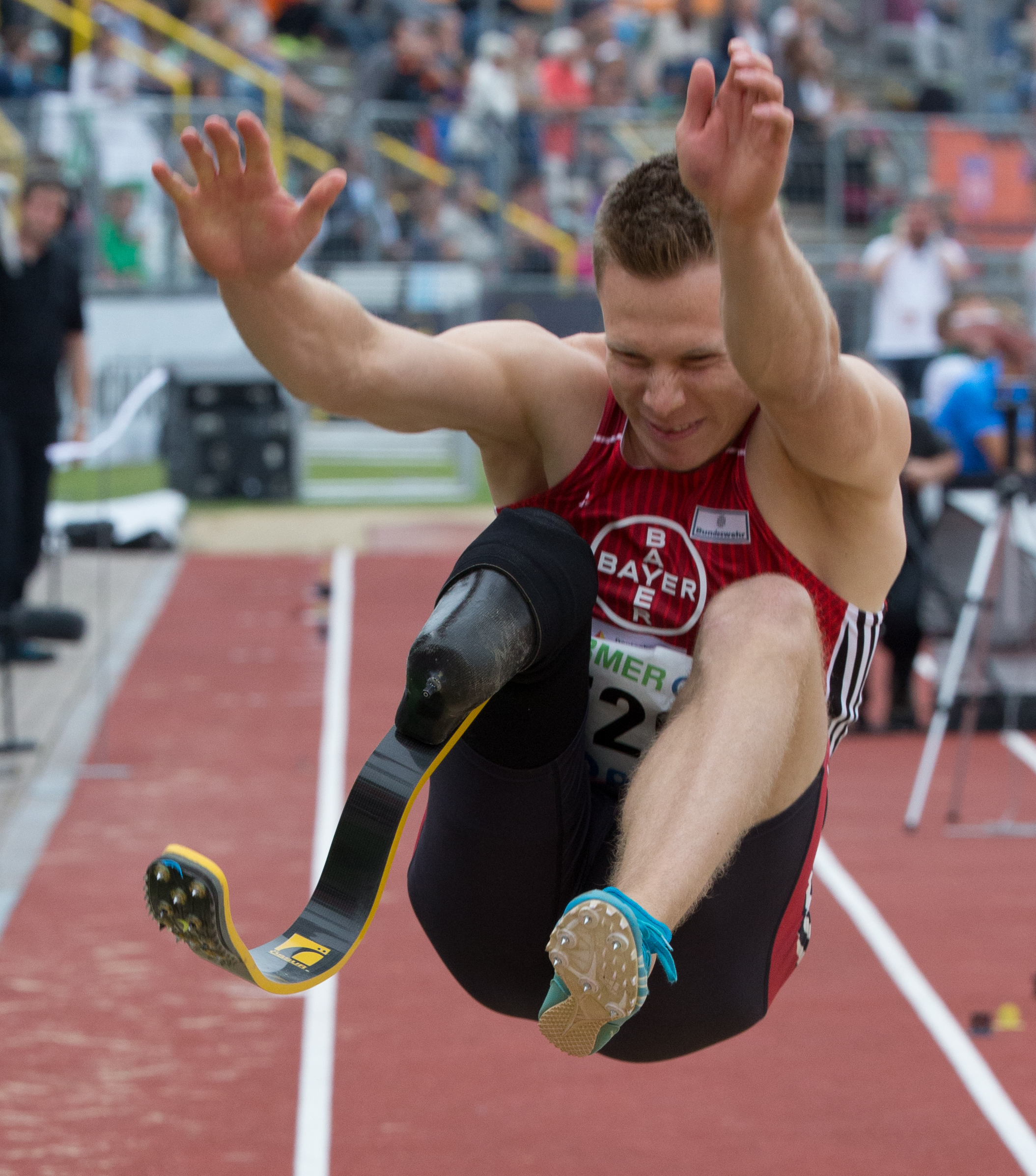
Rehm in 2014, jumping, with his blade in profile

=== 2012 London Paralympics ===
Rehm won a gold medal at the 2012 Summer Paralympics in London in the long jump F42/44 classification. He made (7.35 m/1,093 points) and set a new world record. On winning he stated "I think it was the perfect jump today."

=== 2014 German championships ===
Rehm won the 2014 German Athletics Championships in long jump, with a jump of 8.24 m (27.0 ft). However many able-bodied longjumpers protested that he had an unfair advantage due to his blade. His national title was upheld.

=== 2014 European Athletics Championships ===
Rehm was banned from the 2014 European Athletics Championships, as it was ruled that his blade gave him an unfair advantage over able-bodied athletes. His blade made his amputee right leg 3–4 cm (1.2–1.6 in) longer than his natural leg. Rehm jumps off with his right leg.

=== 2015 German championships ===
Rehm again placed first in the long jump at the 2015 German Athletics Championships. However, his results still do not count towards winning the championship, as the German Federation has ruled that the prosthetics cannot be ruled out as providing an unfair advantage. He finished on top with a jump of 8.11 m (26.6 ft).

=== 2015 IPC Athletics World Championships ===
At the 2015 Doha World Championship, Rehm set a world IPC disability record in the long jump, at 8.40 m (27.6 ft). That distance of 8.40m was enough to win the gold medal at the prior 3 Summer Olympics (2012 London, 2008 Beijing, 2004 Athens).

=== 2016 Rio de Janeiro Olympics ===
Rehm attempted to qualify for the 2016 Summer Olympics, to become the second bladed athlete to compete at the Olympics, following Oscar Pistorius at the 2012 Summer Olympics. A rules change (Note: Competition Rule 144.3(d) bans 'the use of any mechanical aid, unless the athlete can establish on the balance of probabilities that the use of such an aid would not provide him with an overall competitive advantage over an athlete not using such aid.') at the IAAF meant that he needed to qualify his prosthesis with the IAAF to prove that it did not provide an advantage over able-bodied athletes. A study by the University of Cologne determined that the prosthetic was a disadvantage in the run-up portion of the long jump but advantageous during the jump, however there was no overall advantage. However, the IAAF ruled that Germany failed to prove its case, and denied Rehm permission to participate at the Rio Olympics.

=== 2016 Rio de Janeiro Paralympics ===
Rehm competed in the long jump T43/T44 and 4 × 100 m relay T42–47 and won both events, jumping 8.21 m in the final. He served as the flag bearer for Germany at the 2016 Summer Paralympics Parade of Nations.

=== 2017 World Athletics Championships ===
Rehm will again attempt to qualify for an IAAF-sanctioned able-bodied competition, the London 2017 World Championships in Athletics. Following the 2016 Paralympics.

=== 2021 World Para Athletics European Championships (1.06.2021 – 5.06.2021) ===
Markus Rehm won the long jump competition setting a new world record of 8.62m.

== Results ==
=== Non-disabled sports events ===
Time (s) / Distance (s)	Results / Placements	Date	Event	Competition	Remarks
8.24 m (27.0 ft)	Gold	26 July 2014	Long jump	2014 German Athletics Championships	
DSQ	DNS	N/A	Long jump	2014 European Athletics Championships	Rehm qualified to compete, but was later disqualified and did not compete, after his blade was ruled in contravention
8.11 m (26.6 ft)	Top finisher	24 July 2015	Long jump	2015 German Athletics Championships	Rehm competed but was not ranked; he finished with the longest jump. All competitors using prosthetics were deemed to be out of order and did not rank in the placements.
8.10 m (26.6 ft)	Gold	February 2016	Long jump	2016 Glasgow Indoor Grand Prix	
