= Daniel Jørgensen =

Danish Paralympic athlete and snowboarder

Daniel Wagner
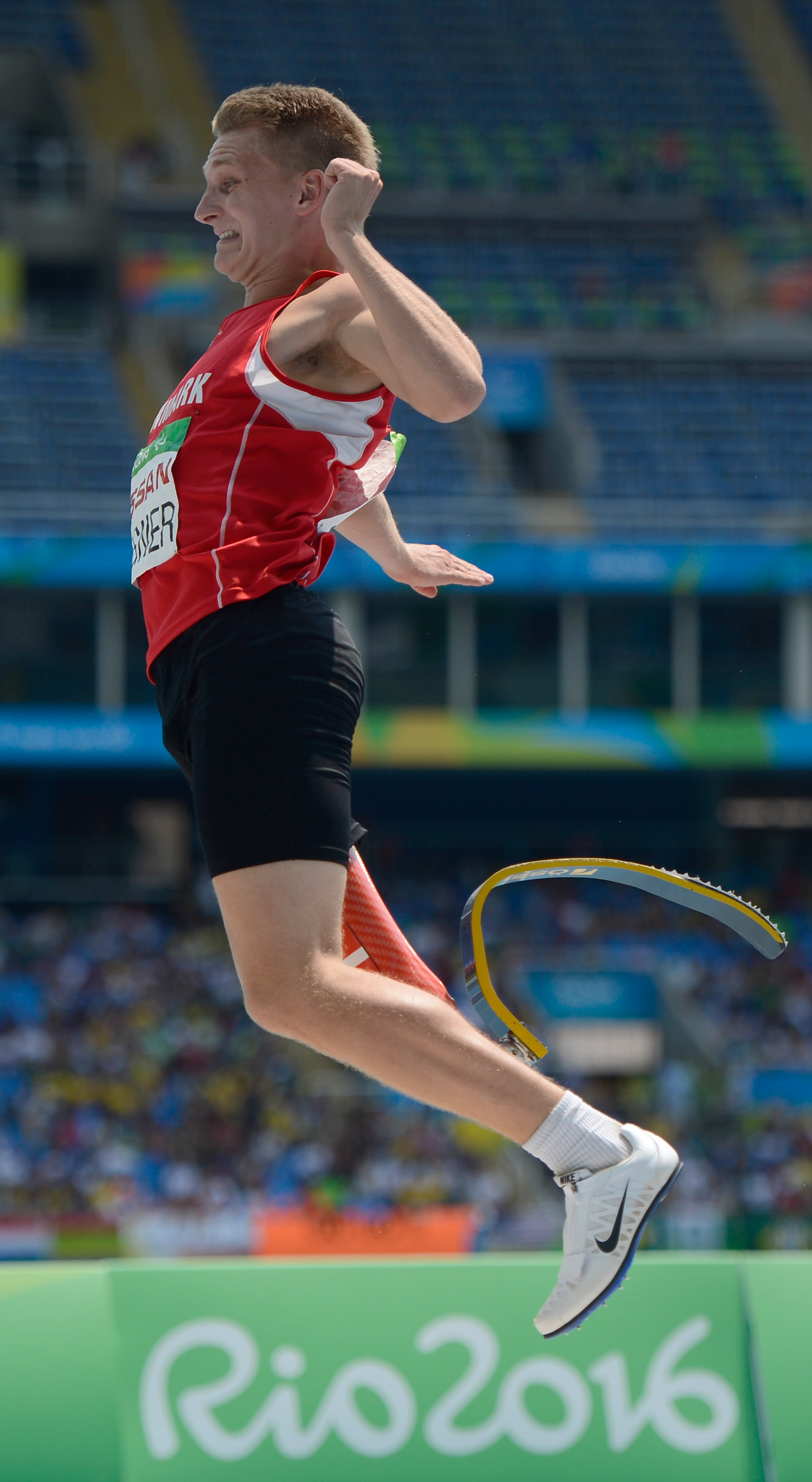

Personal information
- Born: 3 June 1993 (age 33) Vejle, Denmark
- Height: 1.83 m (6 ft 0 in)

Sport
- Country: Denmark
- Sport: Athletics / Snowboarding
- Disability class: T42 (athletics); SB-LL (snowboarding)
- Events: Long jump Sprints
- Club: Vejle IF
- Coached by: Joachim Lund
Medal record
Men's para athletics
Representing Denmark
Paralympic Games
Silver medal – second place	2016 Rio de Janeiro	100 m T42
Silver medal – second place	2024 Paris	100 m T63
Silver medal – second place	2024 Paris	Long jump T63
Bronze medal – third place	2012 London	Long jump T42/44
Bronze medal – third place	2016 Rio de Janeiro	Long jump T42
World Championships
Silver medal – second place	2017 London	100 m T42
Silver medal – second place	2015 Doha	Long jump T42
Silver medal – second place	2023 Paris	Long jump T63
Bronze medal – third place	2015 Doha	100 m T42
Bronze medal – third place	2015 Doha	200 m T42
Bronze medal – third place	2025 New Delhi	Long jump T63
Bronze medal – third place	2025 New Delhi	100 m T63
European Championships
Gold medal – first place	2016 Grosseto	Long jump – T42
Silver medal – second place	2012 Stadskanaal	100m – T42
Silver medal – second place	2012 Stadskanaal	200m – T42
Silver medal – second place	2012 Stadskanaal	Long jump – T42
Silver medal – second place	2014 Swansea	Long jump – F42/44
Silver medal – second place	2014 Swansea	100m – T42
Silver medal – second place	2014 Swansea	200m – T42
Bronze medal – third place	2016 Grosseto	Long jump – T42

Daniel Wagner Jørgensen (born 3 June 1993), who also competes as Daniel Wagner, is a leg amputee Danish Paralympic sportsman who has competed in both track and field athletics and snowboarding. As an athlete he specialises in the long jump, but also competes in sprint events.

== Personal career ==
Jørgensen was born in Vejle, Denmark in 1993. As a youth he was a keen sportsman and took up both snowboarding and gymnastics. In 2008, whilst attempting a double front flip on a trampoline at a gymnastic show he landed badly and dislocated his knee. In the resulting surgery, doctors were sadly forced to amputate his leg.

== Athletics career ==
As sprinting was part of his old gymnastics training, Jørgensen found he had a talent for running as a disability athlete, taking up disability athletics in 2010. Classified as a T42 athlete, Jørgensen first represented Denmark at an international level when he was chosen for the national team at the 2011 IPC Athletics World Championships in Christchurch, New Zealand. In Christchurch he took part in the 100m and 200m sprints but failed to make a podium finish in either events. The following year he was part of the Denmark team that travelled to London to take part in the 2012 Summer Paralympics. There he entered three events, the 100m and 200m sprint, and the long jump, in which he finished third, to claim his first international medal.

In 2013 Jørgensen attended his second World Championship, held in Lyon, where as well as the sprints, he entered the long jump, finishing just outside the medals in fourth place. The following year he attended the 2014 IPC Athletics European Championships in Swansea where he took three medals, a bronze in the 200m and two silvers in the 100m and long jump. Jørgensen showed continual improvement in the buildup to the Rio Paralympics, by winning medals in all three of his events at the 2015 World Championships in Doha. The following year, Jørgensen took gold in the long jump at the 2016 European Championships with a distance of 6.70 metres. This led to a season of tournaments which saw Jørgensen and German rival Heinrich Popow exchange the World record distance on several occasions.

== Snowboarding career ==
Jørgensen began snowboarding while a child and continued to enjoy the sport after his accident. Classified as an SB-LL boarder, he represented Denmark at the 2015 Snowboarding World Championships in La Molina. He entered two events, the snowboard cross and the banked slalom, winning a bronze medal in the latter.

Wagner participated as the only Dane at the snowboarding events at the 2018 Winter Paralympics in Pyeongchang, South Korea. He was also the flagbearer for Denmark at the 2018 Winter Paralympics in the opening ceremony.
