= Kenny van Weeghel =

Dutch Paralympic athlete

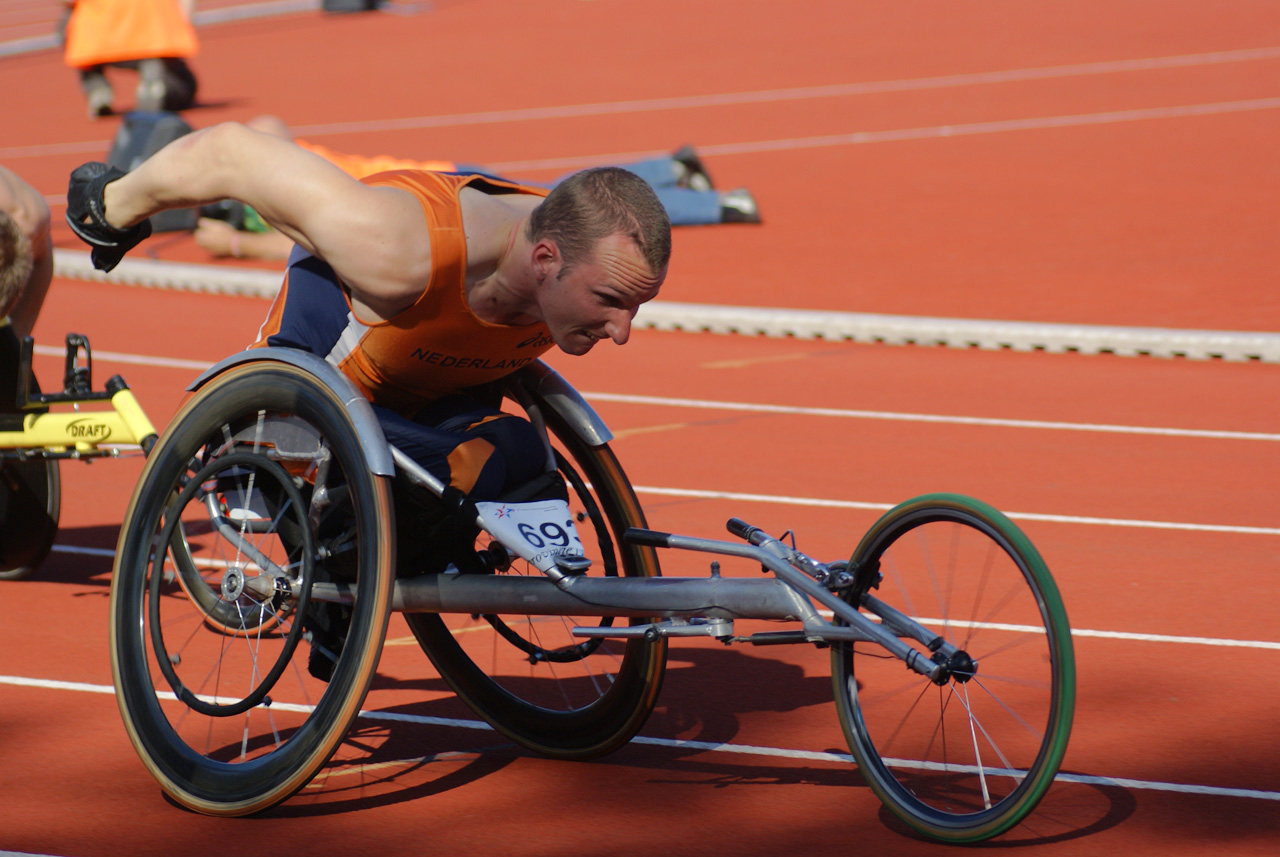
- At the 2006 IPC World Championships

Personal information
- Full name: Kenny van Weeghel
- Nationality: Dutch
- Born: 16 September 1980 (age 45) Zwolle
- Website: kennyvanweeghel.nl

Sport
- Country: Netherlands
- Sport: Paralympic athletics
- Disability class: T54
- Event: Wheelchair racing
- Coached by: Arno Mul

Achievements and titles
- Paralympic finals: 2004 Summer Paralympics
Medal record
Men's Paralympic athletics
Representing Netherlands
Paralympic Games
Gold medal – first place	2004 Athens	400 m T54
Gold medal – first place	2016 Rio de Janeiro	400 m T54
Silver medal – second place	2004 Athens	200 m T54
Silver medal – second place	2012 London	400 m T54
Bronze medal – third place	2004 Athens	100 m T54
Bronze medal – third place	2016 Rio de Janeiro	100 m T54
IAAF World Championships {exhibition events}
Silver medal – second place	2005 Helsinki	100 m T54
Silver medal – second place	2005 Helsinki	200 m T54
IPC World Championships
Gold medal – first place	2002 Lille	100 m T54
Gold medal – first place	2006 Assen	200 m T54
Gold medal – first place	2013 Lyon	200 m T54
Gold medal – first place	2015 Doha	200 m T54
Silver medal – second place	2013 Lyon	100 m T54
Silver medal – second place	2015 Doha	800 m T54
Silver medal – second place	2002 Lille	200 m T54
Bronze medal – third place	2002 Lille	400 m T54
Bronze medal – third place	2011 Christchurch	100 m T54
Bronze medal – third place	2015 Doha	100 m T54
Bronze medal – third place	2015 Doha	400 m T54
Bronze medal – third place	2017 London	100 m T54
IPC European Championships
Gold medal – first place	2012 Stadskanaal	400 m T54
Gold medal – first place	2014 Swansea	400 m T54
Gold medal – first place	2014 Swansea	200 m T54
Silver medal – second place	2012 Stadskanaal	100 m T54
Silver medal – second place	2014 Swansea	100 m T54
Silver medal – second place	2014 Swansea	800 m T54
Silver medal – second place	2018 Berlin	100 m T54
Silver medal – second place	2018 Berlin	200 m T54
Silver medal – second place	2018 Berlin	400 m T54
Silver medal – second place	2021 Bydgoszcz	100 m T54
Silver medal – second place	2021 Bydgoszcz	400 m T54
Bronze medal – third place	2018 Berlin	1500 m T54

Kenny van Weeghel (born 16 September 1980 in Zwolle) is a Paralympic athlete from the Netherlands competing in the 100, 200 and 400 m T54 class wheelchair racing. He participated in the Paralympic games six times already and he has won 6 Paralympic medals among which two golden ones.

== Athletics career ==
Weeghel won the 200m at the European Championships in 2001. This was his first main title and there were many to come. In 2002 he became World Champion by winning the 100m and a year later he won both the 100m and 200m during the World Championships. At the European Championships that same year (2003) he won the 200m and 400m.

At the 2004 Summer Paralympics in Athens, he won his first three Paralympic medals: bronze on the 100m, silver on the 200m and gold on the 400m. He was elected Dutch handicapped sportsman of the year.

In 2005 the World Championships in Athletics were held in Helsinki and T54 wheelchair racing was added to the program as an exhibition event. In both the 100m and 200m he won the silver medal behind British athlete David Weir.

In 2006, in Assen in the Netherlands, he became once more World Champion 200m, while taking second place (by a mere 0.01 s) on the 100 m behind David Weir.

Van Weeghel won a silver medal at the Paralympic Games in 2012 in London (400m) and won two Paralympic medals at the Rio de Janeiro Paralympic games in 2016; gold for the 400m and bronze for the 100m.

== Personal records ==
Discipline	Result	Place	Date	Notes
100 m	13,78	Arbon	24 June 2010	
200 m	24,22	Arbon	27 May 2017	European Record
400 m	45,40	Arbon	27 May 2017	
800 m	1:32,80	Arbon	28 May 2017	
1500 m	3:01,30	Nottwil	27 May 2016	

== Awards ==
- Order of the Lion of the Netherlands – 2004
- National disabled sportsman of the year – 2004
- Atletiekunie Paralympic athlete of the year – 2014
- Honorary citizenship of the province of Brabant – 2017
