= 2017 World Para Athletics Championships – Men's triple jump =

The men's triple jump at the 2017 World Para Athletics Championships was held at the Olympic Stadium in London from 14 to 23 July.

== Medalists ==
Event	Gold		Silver		Bronze	
T20	Dmytro Prudnikov; Ukraine	14.50 WR	Lenine Cunha; Portugal	13.03 SB	Alain Omar Villamarin; Argentina	12.57 AR
T47	Tobi Fawehinmi; United States	14.88 SB	Christos Koutoulias; Greece	13.84 PB	Hajimu Ashida; Japan	13.58
WR world record | AR area record | CR championship record | GR games record | NR national record | OR Olympic record | PB personal best | SB season best | WL world leading (in a given season)

Events listed in pink were contested but no medals were awarded.

== See also ==
- List of IPC world records in athletics
