= Heinrich Popow =

German Paralympic sprinter

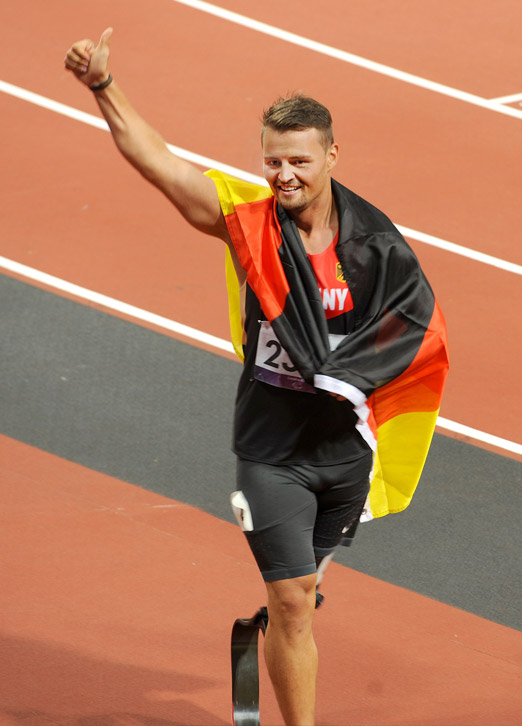
- Paralympics 2012: Heinrich Popow on his lap of honour after winning Gold in 100 metres

Personal information
- Nationality: German
- Born: 14 July 1983 (age 43) Abay, Kazakhstan
- Website: www.heinrich-popow.com

Sport
- Sport: Track and field and bob
- Events: 100m, 200m, 4 × 100 m, long jump
- Club: TSV Bayer 04 Leverkusen
Medal record
Men's paralympic athletics
Representing Germany
Paralympic Games
Gold medal – first place	2012 London	100 m T42
Silver medal – second place	2008 Beijing	100 m T42
Bronze medal – third place	2004 Athens	100 m T42
Bronze medal – third place	2004 Athens	200 m T42
Bronze medal – third place	2004 Athens	Long jump F42–46
Bronze medal – third place	2012 London	200 m T42
Bronze medal – third place	2012 London	4 × 100 m T42–46
IPC World Championships
Gold medal – first place	2011 Christchurch	100 m T42
Gold medal – first place	2011 Christchurch	Long jump F42
Gold medal – first place	2013 Lyon	100 m T42
Bronze medal – third place	2002 Lille	Long jump
Bronze medal – third place	2006 Assen	Long jump
Bronze medal – third place	2013 Lyon	200 m T42
Bronze medal – third place	2013 Lyon	Long jump T42
IWAS World Games
Gold medal – first place	2009 Bangalore	200 m
Gold medal – first place	2009 Bangalore	4 × 100 m
Silver medal – second place	2007 Taipei	100 m
Silver medal – second place	2007 Taipei	200 m
Silver medal – second place	2007 Taipei	Long jump
Silver medal – second place	2009 Bangalore	100 m
Silver medal – second place	2009 Bangalore	Long jump
IPC European Championships
Gold medal – first place	2012 Stadskanaal	100 m T42
Silver medal – second place	2005 Espoo	Long jump
Silver medal – second place	2016 Grosseto	Long jump T42
Bronze medal – third place	2005 Espoo	100 m
Bronze medal – third place	2005 Espoo	4 × 100 m
Bronze medal – third place	2005 Espoo	High jump
Bronze medal – third place	2012 Stadskanaal	Long jump F42/44

Heinrich Popow (born 14 July 1983) is a German sprinter. At the Paralympics 2012 in London he won Gold in 100 metres sprint. During his career he has been the World and European Champion in 100 metres sprint and World Champion in the long jump. In total, he won 27 medals at the Paralympic Games, World and European Championships.

== Disciplines ==
Heinrich Popow specialises in 100 metres sprint, the most prestigious discipline in track and field. Furthermore, he starts in 200 metres, long jump and 4 × 100 metres relay.

== Athletic successes ==
Heinrich Popow started his sport career in 2001 at TSV Bayer 04 Leverkusen. Following an invitation for a track and field training at Bayer, he convinced his coaches by excellent results. Today he practises in a group of Karl-Heinz Düe together with heptathletes like the German Olympian Jennifer Oeser. At the World Championships in Athletics in Lille, 2002, he won a bronze medal in long jump and established himself as a top athlete. At his first Paralympics in Athens 2004 he won three bronze medals in 100 metres, 200 metres, and long jump. Popow boosted performance at the Paralympics in Beijing 2008 once again and won the silver medal by running 100 metres in 12.98 seconds. Finally, Heinrich Popow won Gold in 100 metres at the Paralympics in London 2012. With a time of 12.40 seconds, he prevailed over the Australian Scott Reardon and his German team-mate Wojtek Czyz at the Olympic Stadium.

== Childhood and job ==
Heinrich Popow's family emigrated from Kazakhstan to Germany when he was seven years old. He grew up in Nisterau (Westerwald), in Western Germany. At the age of nine, his left leg was amputated up to the thigh as a consequence of an Ewing's sarcoma in the left fibula (knee disarticulation). In Interviews, the athlete points out that the amputation was harder for his parents than for himself. His biggest concern those days was about not being able to play football as he did before. Heinrich Popow describes himself as sports-mad. He tried several sports after his amputation, before starting track and field, in 2001, at TSV Bayer 04 Leverkusen. He works part-time as an IT system administrator at the football club Bayer 04 Leverkusen Fußball GmbH.

== Work with young talents ==
In addition to his athletic career, Heinrich Popow supports and motivates young talents. He visits amputees in hospitals to motivate them for sports after their amputation. At Bayer 04, he acts as a mentor for several young athletes and supports their career with words of advice. To reach young talents, Heinrich Popow relies on social media.

== Popularity and positioning ==
Heinrich Popow is one of the most popular German athletes on Facebook. The number of his fans grows constantly. Due to his clear statements he became "probably the most admired Paralympian in Germany." Often quoted by mass media, Heinrich Popow became a needed voice of Paralympic sports in Germany. The man from Leverkusen demands "respect and appreciation" for Paralympic athletes. At the same time, he claims a professionalisation of Paralympic sports. Popow defended lower bonuses for Paralympic athletes compared to Olympic winners. He explains his opinion with the lower competition within the Paralympic field. Furthermore, Popow defended the separation of the Paralympics and Olympics, otherwise the Paralympics would be eclipsed by the Olympic Games.

== Nominations and Prizes ==
In November 2012, Heinrich Popow was repeatedly honoured with a Silver Laurel Leaf, the highest sports award conferred by the Federal President of Germany to outstanding athletes. In 2011, Heinrich Popow was one of the most promising candidates for the election of the German award "Disabled Athlete of the Year". After his success in London 2012, he is again nominated for this award.
