= Mariusz Sobczak =

Polish Paralympic athlete (born 1982)

Personal information
- Nationality: Polish
- Born: 8 February 1982 (age 44) Zduńska Wola, Poland
- Height: 176 cm (69 in)

Sport
- Country: Poland
- Sport: Athletics
- Disability class: T36
- Event(s): Sprint; Long jump
- Club: START Random
- Coached by: Jacek Szczygiel (club); Zbigniew Lewkowicz (national)
Medal record
Men's paralympic athletics
Representing Poland
Paralympic Games
Silver medal – second place	2012 London	200 m T36
IPC World Championships
Silver medal – second place	2002 Assen	Long jump F36–38
Silver medal – second place	2013 Lyon	Long jump T36
Bronze medal – third place	2011 Christchurch	long jump T36
IPC European Championships
Gold medal – first place	2012 Stadskanaal	Long jump T36
Silver medal – second place	2014 Swansea	Long jump T36
Bronze medal – third place	2016 Grosseto	Long jump T36

Mariusz Sobczak (born 8 February 1982) is a Paralympic athlete from Poland. He has cerebral palsy and competes in T36 sprint and long jump events.

== Athletic career ==
Sobczak first represented Poland at the 2004 Summer Paralympics in Beijing, entering the long jump and 100m sprint, but he failed to achieve a podium finish in either. At the 2012 Summer Paralympics, he won a silver medal in the F36 long jump.

As well as his Paralympic success, Sobczak has also medaled at both World and European level, collecting six major international top three finishes.
