= Gocha Khugaev =

Russian Paralympic athlete

Personal information
- Nationality: Russian
- Born: Gocha Khugaev; 16 July 1984 (age 41)

Sport
- Country: Russia
- Sport: Athletics
- Disability: Cerebral Palsy
- Disability class: T/F37
- Club: North Caucasian Federal District

Achievements and titles
- Paralympic finals: London 2012: Javelin throw
Medal record
Men's Athletics
Paralympic Games
Gold medal – first place	2012 London	Long jump T37–38
IPC Athletics World Championships
Gold medal – first place	2013 Lyon	4 × 100 m Relay T35–38
IPC Athletics European Championships
Gold medal – first place	2012 Stadskanaal	200m T37
Gold medal – first place	2012 Stadskanaal	Long jump T37–38
Silver medal – second place	2016 Grosseto	100m T38
Bronze medal – third place	2014 Swansea	Long jump T37
- Updated on 9 June 2014

Gocha Khugaev, (Russian: Гоча Олегович Хугаев) (born 16 July 1984) is a Russian athlete who competes in disability athletics in the F58 category. At the 2012 European Championships Khugaev set a European record whilst winning the 200 metres. He also won gold in the long jump in a combined F37/38 class, however an illegal wind reading of 2.4 m/s prevented him from setting a world record. Khugaev set a F37 world record for the long jump at the London Paralympic Games as he won gold in a combined F37/38 class.
