= Mykyta Senyk =

Ukrainian Paralympic athlete

Medal record

Track and field (T38)

Representing Ukraine

Paralympic Games
Bronze medal – third place	2008 Beijing	100m – T38
Bronze medal – third place	2008 Beijing	200m – T38

IPC World Championships
Bronze medal – third place	2017 London	Long jump – T38

IPC European Championships
Gold medal – first place	2012 Stadskanaal	100m – T38
Gold medal – first place	2012 Stadskanaal	200m – T38
Gold medal – first place	2014 Swansea	100m – T38
Gold medal – first place	2014 Swansea	200m – T38

Mykyta Senyk (Ukrainian: Микита Сеник) is a Paralympic athlete from Ukraine competing mainly in category T38 sprint events.

He competed in the 2008 Summer Paralympics in Beijing, China. There he won a bronze medal in the men's 100 metres – T38 event and a bronze medal in the men's 200 metres – T38 event
