= Lorenzo Albaladejo =

Spanish Paralympic athlete

Personal information
- Full name: Lorenzo Albaladejo Martínez
- Nationality: Spanish
- Born: 4 May 1990 (age 36) Murcia, Spain
- Website: LorenzoAlbaladejo.com

Sport
- Country: Spain
- Sport: Track and field (T38)
Medal record
IPC European Championships
Silver medal – second place	2012 Stadskanaal	100m – T38
Silver medal – second place	2012 Stadskanaal	200m – T38
Silver medal – second place	2014 Swansea	100m – T38
Silver medal – second place	2014 Swansea	200m – T38
Bronze medal – third place	2016 Grosseto	200m – T38
Bronze medal – third place	2016 Grosseto	400m – T38

Lorenzo Albaladejo Martínez (Note: In this Spanish name, the first or paternal surname is Albaladejo and the second or maternal family name is Martínez.) (born 4 May 1990 in Murcia, Spain) is a Paralympic athlete from Spain, competing mainly in category T38 sprint events.

== Personal ==
Albaladejo was born 4 May 1990 in Murcia, Spain. He has cerebral palsy, a condition he has had since birth. In 2012, he resided in San Javier. In 2012, he was one of several athletes honored at the Murcia Sports Merit Awards organized by the Spanish Sports Press Association in Murcia. In December 2013, he attended an event marking Spanish insurance company Santa Lucía Seguros becoming a sponsor of the Spanish Paralympic Committee, and consequently Plan ADOP which funds high performance Spanish disability sport competitors. He chose to attend the event because he wanted to show support for this type of sponsorship. In December 2013, he participated in an event related to Spain's constitution day at the Centro Deportivo Municipal Moratalaz in Madrid.

== Athletics ==
Albaladejo is a Paralympic athlete from Spain competing mainly in category T38 in sprint events.

During the 2011/2012 season, Albaladejo competed for the Murcia based Club Escuela de Atletismo San Javier and trained there and, occasionally, in Murcia. In 2012, he was the Spanish national champion in the 100 and 200 meter events. He competed at the 2012 European Stadskanaal, where he earned a pair of silver medals in the 100 meter and 200 meter T38 events. He competed in the 2012 Summer Paralympics in London, England where he finished 6th in the 100 meter event and 7th in the 200 meter event. He was the top European finisher in the 200 meter event. For the 2012/2013 athletics season, he competed for the Madrid-based Club Atletismo Gredos de San Diego and was coached by Jorge Marín. In July 2013, he participated in the 2013 IPC Athletics World Championships.
