= Joshua Andrew Howard =

British para athlete

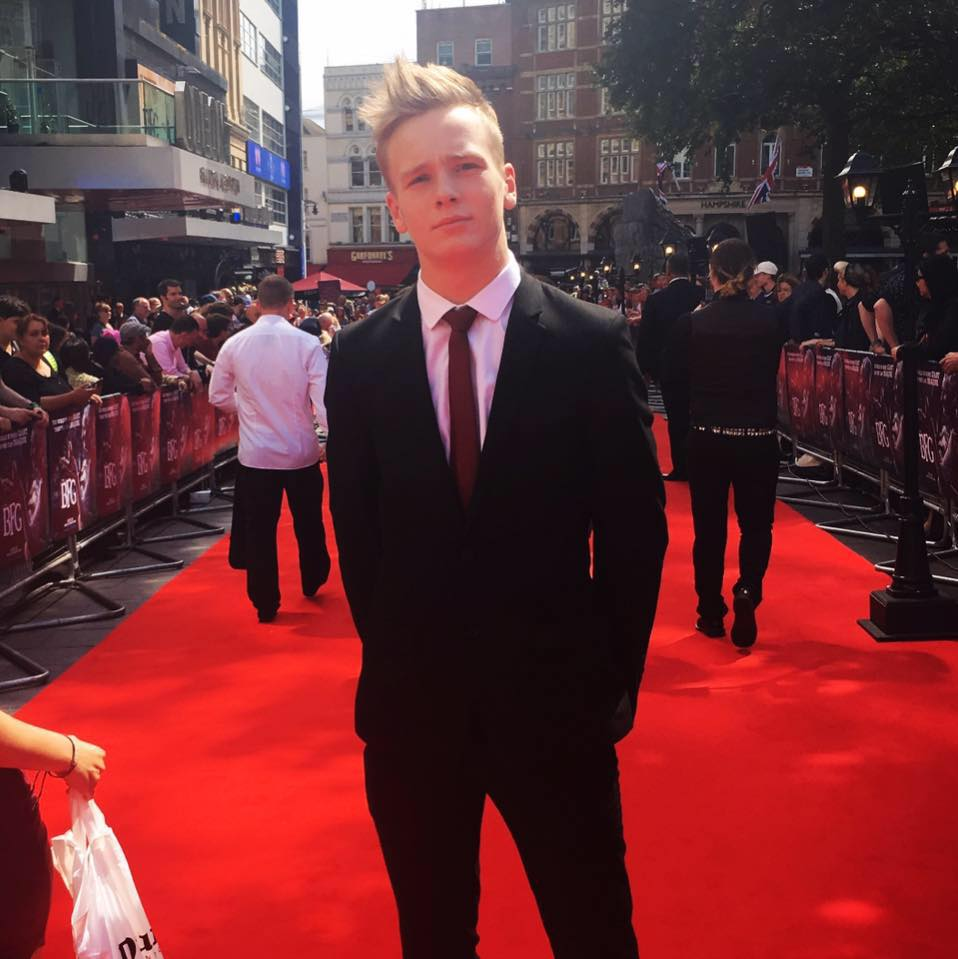

Personal information
- National team: Great Britain
- Born: Joshua Andrew Howard Manchester, England
- Occupation: Athlete
- Years active: 2010–2017
- Employer: British Athletics
- Agent: James Reed

Sport
- Country: Great Britain
- Sport: Athletics
- Disability: Cerebral Palsy
- Disability class: T38
- Rank: British No1
- Track: Long Jump
- Club: Sale Harriers
- Coached by: Kieth Hunter

Achievements and titles
- Regional finals: European 3rd 2016
- National finals: National Champion
- Highest world ranking: 5th World
- Personal best: 5.75m

Joshua Andrew Howard is a professional para athlete from Manchester, England. He competes in the Long Jump in the T38 classification and represented Great Britain at the 2016 Summer IPC European Championships in Grosseto, Italy

== Athletic career ==
Howard first became involved with the sport at a late stage when he was aged 11. His first club was Manchester Harriers, based at Sports City, Manchester. Howard got involved in multiple sports including football and basketball, he trained with Manchester Harriers for four years mainly focusing on the 100m and 200m events. In late 2015, after competing in no competitions, he joined Stockport Harriers where he was introduced to the long jump by Joe Frost. On 5 December, Howard competed in his first long jump competition at Loughborough University, securing a jump of 4.48m, which saw him break the T38 British record.

On 30 January 2016, Howard went back to Loughborough University to compete in the 60m (securing a time of 8.36 seconds) including long jump, where he beat the British Athletics Paralympic Entry Standard with a first round jump of 5.09m. Howard was invited to Grosseto, Italy to be internationally classified as a T38 athlete. He then went on to compete and secured a PB of 5.32m. When he returned he was picked for the IPC European Championships in Grosseto to compete in the T38 long jump with the likes of Richard Whitehead. Howard secured his senior debut, skipping the junior level, and achieving his international vest. Howard competed on 16 June 2016, securing a jump of 5.42, finishing third (no medal).

In September 2016 Josh moved coaches from Joe Frost to Keith Hunter. He was not selected for the London 2017 World Championships.
