= Emanuele Di Marino =

Italian Paralympic athlete

Personal information
- Born: 9 February 1989 (age 37) Salerno, Italy
- Height: 1.80 m (5 ft 11 in)

Sport
- Country: Italy
- Sport: Paralympic athletics
- Disability: Club foot
- Disability class: T44
Medal record
Paralympic athletics
Representing Italy
World Championships
Silver medal – second place	2017 London	4 × 100 m relay T42-47
Bronze medal – third place	2017 London	400 m T44
European Championships
Gold medal – first place	2021 Bydgoszcz	400 m T44
Silver medal – second place	2018 Berlin	4 × 100 m relay T42-47/61-64
Bronze medal – third place	2014 Swansea	400 m T44
Bronze medal – third place	2016 Grosseto	400 m T44
Bronze medal – third place	2016 Grosseto	4 × 100 m relay T42-47

Emanuele Di Marino (born 9 February 1989) is an Italian Paralympic athlete who specialises in the 400 metres and 4 × 100 metre relay. He is a double World medalist and a European champion.
