= Andriy Onufriyenko =

Ukrainian Paralympic athlete (born 1983)

Medal record

Track and field (T38)

Representing Ukraine

Paralympic Games
Bronze medal – third place	2004 Athens	4x100m - T35-38
Bronze medal – third place	2004 Athens	4x400m - T35-38
Bronze medal – third place	2008 Beijing	400m - T38

European Championships
Gold medal – first place	2014 Swansea	Long jump - T37
Silver medal – second place	2012 Stadskanaal	400 metres - T38
Silver medal – second place	2012 Stadskanaal	200 metres - T38
Bronze medal – third place	2014 Swansea	200 metres - T37
Bronze medal – third place	2014 Swansea	400 metres - T37

Andriy Onufriyenko (Ukrainian: Андрій Онуфрієнко) (born 7 January 1983) is an athlete and Paralympian from Ukraine competing mainly in category T38 sprint events.

He competed in the 2000 Summer Paralympics in Sydney, Australia. There he finished fourth in the men's 100 metres - T38 event, finished fourth in the men's 200 metres - T38 event and finished fourth in the men's 400 metres - T38 event. He also competed at the 2004 Summer Paralympics in Athens, Greece. There he won a bronze medal in the men's 4 x 100 metre relay - T35-38 event, a bronze medal in the men's 4 x 400 metre relay - T35-38 event, finished sixth in the men's 100 metres - T38 event, finished fourth in the men's 200 metres - T38 event and finished fourth in the men's 400 metres - T38 event. He also competed at the 2008 Summer Paralympics in Beijing, China. There he won a bronze medal in the men's 400 metres - T38 event, finished sixth in the men's 100 metres - T38 event and went out in the first round of the men's 200 metres - T38 event
