= Roman Pavlyk =

Ukrainian Paralympic athlete (born 1983)

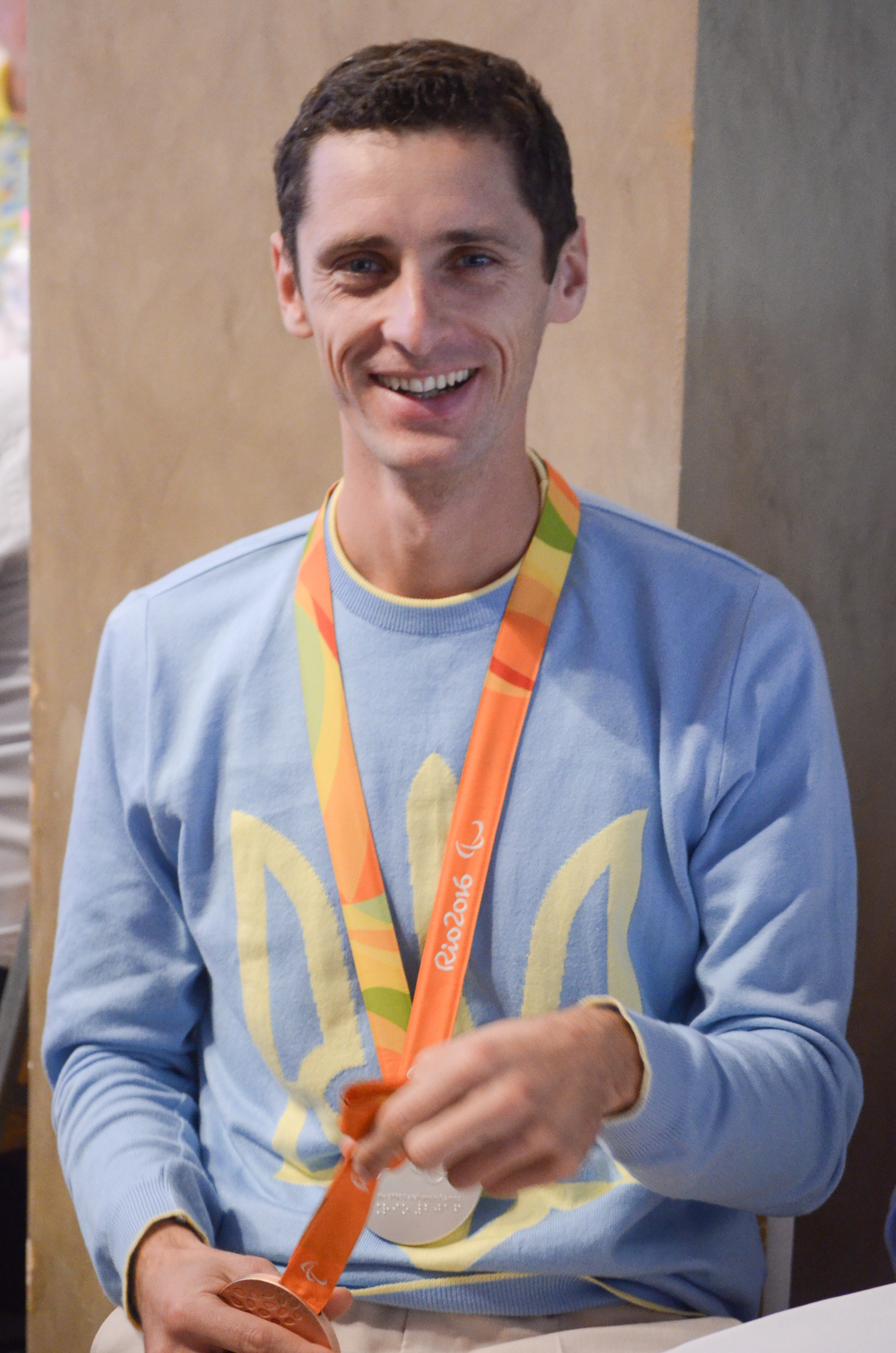
- Roman Pavlyk in October 2016

Personal information
- Nationality: Ukrainian
- Born: 1 December 1983 (age 42)

Sport
- Country: Ukraine
- Sport: Athletics
- Disability class: T36
- Event(s): Sprint; Long jump
Medal record
Event	1st	2nd	3rd
Paralympic Games	4	1	2
World Championships	3	4	5
European Championships	2	2	1
Men's paralympic athletics
Representing Ukraine
Paralympic Games
Gold medal – first place	2008 Beijing	100 m T36
Gold medal – first place	2008 Beijing	400 m T36
Gold medal – first place	2012 London	200 m T36
Gold medal – first place	2012 London	Long jump F36
Silver medal – second place	2008 Beijing	200 m T36
Bronze medal – third place	2012 London	400 m T36
Bronze medal – third place	2012 London	100 m T36
IPC World Championships
Gold medal – first place	2011 Christchurch	4 × 100 m T33–38
Gold medal – first place	2011 Christchurch	200 m T36
Gold medal – first place	2013 Lyon	Long jump T36
Silver medal – second place	2013 Lyon	100 m T36
Silver medal – second place	2013 Lyon	200 m T36
Silver medal – second place	2015 Doha	Long jump T36
Silver medal – second place	2015 Doha	200 m T36
Bronze medal – third place	2011 Christchurch	100 m T36
Bronze medal – third place	2011 Christchurch	400 m T36
Bronze medal – third place	2013 Lyon	4 × 100 m T33–38
Bronze medal – third place	2015 Doha	100 m T36
Bronze medal – third place	2015 Doha	400 m T36
IPC European Championships
Gold medal – first place	2012 Stadskanaal	200 m T36
Gold medal – first place	2014 Swansea	Long jump T36
Silver medal – second place	2012 Stadskanaal	100 m T36
Silver medal – second place	2012 Stadskanaal	Long jump T36
Bronze medal – third place	2014 Swansea	200 m T36

Roman Pavlyk (Ukrainian: Роман Павлик; born 1 December 1983) is a Paralympic athlete from Ukraine. He has cerebral palsy and competes in T36 sprint and F36 long jump events.

He competed in the 2008 Summer Paralympics in Beijing, China. There he won a gold medal in the men's 100 metres (330 ft) – T36 event, a gold medal in the men's 400 metres (1,300 ft) – T36 event and a silver medal in the men's 200 metres (660 ft) – T36 event. At the 2012 Summer Paralympics he won gold medals in long jump and 200 metres events, and bronze in 100 m and 400 m races.

He holds the long jump world record for F36 classified athletes.

In 2023, he competed in the men's long jump T36 event at the World Para Athletics Championships held in Paris, France.
