= Mateusz Michalski (sprinter) =

Polish Paralympic athlete (born 1987)

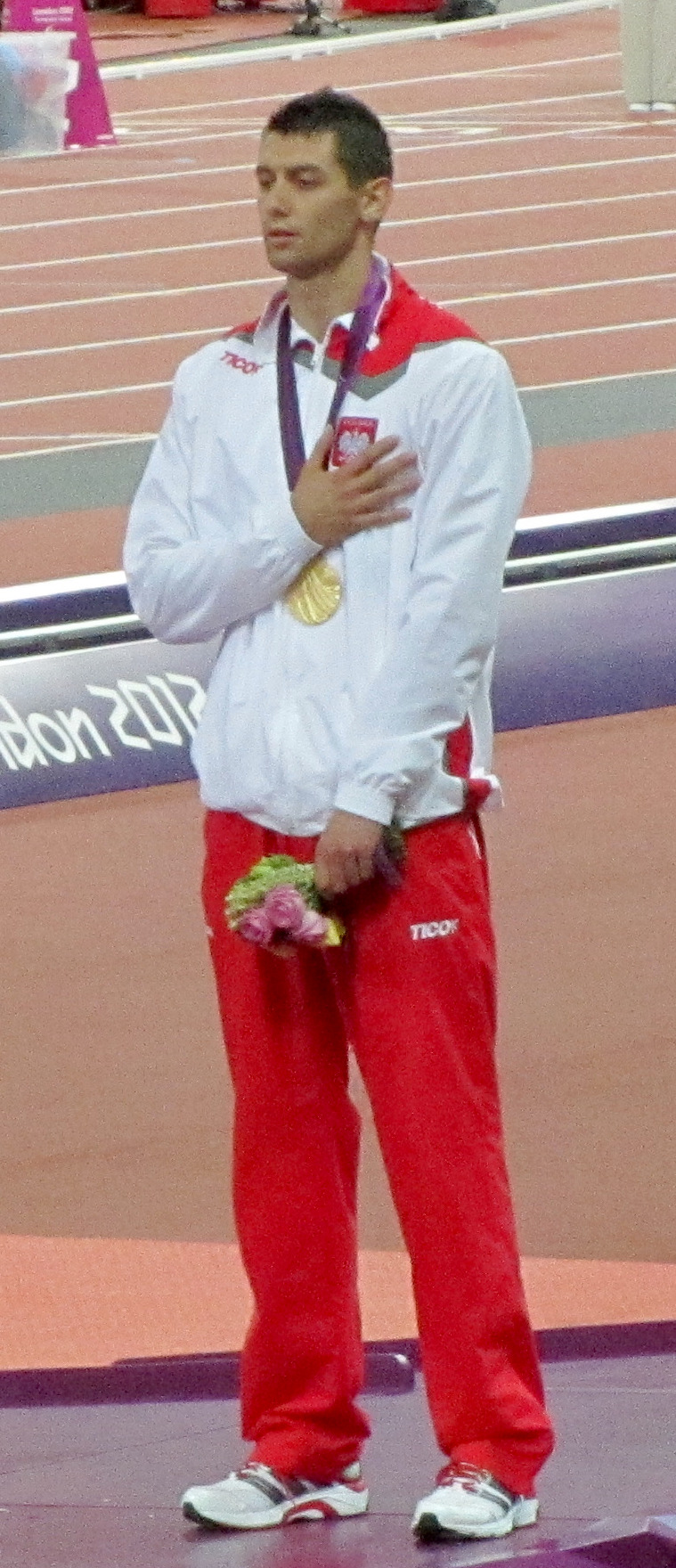
- Michalski at the 2012 Paralympics

Personal information
- Nationality: Polish
- Born: 29 August 1987 (age 39) Września, Poland

Sport
- Sport: Paralympic athletics
- Disability: Visual impairment
- Disability class: T12
- Coached by: Adam Kaczor

Achievements and titles
- Paralympic finals: 2008; 2012
Medal record
Event	1st	2nd	3rd
Paralympic Games	1	1	0
World Championships	4	1	1
European Championships	3	1	0
Representing Poland
Paralympic Games
Gold medal – first place	2012 London	200 m T12
Silver medal – second place	2012 London	100 m T12
IPC World Championships
Gold medal – first place	2011 Christchurch	100 m T12
Gold medal – first place	2011 Christchurch	200 m T12
Gold medal – first place	2013 Lyon	100 m T12
Gold medal – first place	2013 Lyon	200 m T12
Silver medal – second place	2017 London	100 m T13
Bronze medal – third place	2015 Doha	200 m T13
IPC European Championships
Gold medal – first place	2012 Stadskanaal	100 m T12
Gold medal – first place	2016 Grosseto	100 m T13
Gold medal – first place	2016 Grosseto	200 m T13
Silver medal – second place	2014 Swansea	100 m T12

Mateusz Michalski (born 29 August 1987) is a visually impaired sprinter from Poland. He competed at the 2008, 2012 and 2016 Paralympics and won a gold in the 200 metres and a silver in the 100 metres in 2012. His time of 21.56 s in the 200 m set a new world record.

== Career history ==
Michalski was born in Września, Poland in 1987. He is visually impaired, and describes his vision as being about ten percent. He took up athletics at the age of 16, after a coach at his school introduced him to the sport.

In 2008, Michalski travelled to Beijing as part of the Polish team to compete in the Summer Paralympics. At the games he competed in both 100m and 200m sprint events. In the 100m Michalski progressed through the first round, but finished 9th in the semifinal, failing to reach the finals. In the 200m he reached the finals, finishing eighth in a time of 22.75 seconds.

Michalski's first major international success came at the 2011 IPC Athletics World Championships in Christchurch, New Zealand. There he won both the 100m and 200m gold in the T12 category. The next year he competed in the 2012 IPC Athletics European Championships in Stadskanaal, racing in the 100m – T12. In the final he beat Russia's Fedor Trikolich to take the European title. Two months later he competed at the 2012 Summer Paralympics in London. In the 100m Michalski progressed through to the finals, but was beaten into second place by Trikoli. In the 200m he was placed into qualifier Heat 3 alongside Trikoli. In the heat he recorded a season's best of 22.13 to go through to the semi-finals in first place. Trikoli also qualified after recording a personal best, going through to the semis as one of the fastest losers. The two rivals met again in the semifinals in heat 2. Michalski recorded another season's best with an improved time of 22.09, but this was not enough to beat Trikoli who produced another personal best to finish in 21.94. Michalski's time saw him qualify through to the final in the only fastest loser's position at the expense of Yang Yuqing of China, who recorded a time of 22.30 in the first heat. The final, held on 8 September, saw Michalski run the 200m in a time of 21.56 setting a new world record, leaving Trikoli with the silver.

His achievements in London saw Michalski named Disabled Athlete of the year at the 2013 Polish Sportspersonality of the Year on 11 January.

== Awards and honours ==
He received the Cross of Merit from the president of Poland in 2013.
