= Radoslav Zlatanov =

Bulgarian Paralympic athlete

Personal information
- Nationality: Bulgarian
- Born: 14 December 1987 (age 38) Veliko Tarnovo, Bulgaria
- Height: 180 cm (5 ft 11 in)
- Weight: 65 kg (143 lb)

Sport
- Country: Bulgaria
- Sport: Athletics
- Disability class: T13
- Club: Vasil Levski National Sports Academy
- Coached by: Georgi Nedev
Medal record
Men's Paralympic athletics
Representing Bulgaria
Paralympic Games
Bronze medal – third place	2012 London	Long jump T13
IPC World Championships
Silver medal – second place	2013 Lyon	100 m T13
IPC European Championships
Gold medal – first place	2014 Swansea	100 m T13
Silver medal – second place	2012 Stadskanaal	200 m T13
Silver medal – second place	2012 Stadskanaal	Long jump T13
Silver medal – second place	2016 Grosseto	Long jump T13
Silver medal – second place	2016 Grosseto	100 m T13
Bronze medal – third place	2012 Stadskanaal	100 m T13

Radoslav Zlatanov (born 14 December 1987) is a visually impaired Bulgarian track and field athlete. Competing in the T13 classification, Zlatanov has competed at two Summer Paralympic Games, winning a bronze in the long jump at the 2012 Games in London. He is also a multiple World and European Championships winner, taking seven medals over seven tournaments in both long jump and sprint events.
