= Tobias Jonsson =

Swedish Paralympic athlete (born 1996)

Personal information
- Born: 29 February 1996 (age 30) Mellerud, Sweden

Sport
- Country: Sweden
- Sport: Para athletics
- Disability: Stargardt disease
- Disability class: T12
- Club: IK Orient
Medal record
Para athletics
Representing Sweden
World Championships
| Silver medal – second place | 2017 London | Long jump T12 |
European Championships
| Silver medal – second place | 2016 Grosseto | Long jump T12 |
| Silver medal – second place | 2018 Berlin | Long jump T12 |
| Bronze medal – third place | 2014 Swansea | Long jump T13 |
| Bronze medal – third place | 2021 Bydgoszcz | Long jump T12 |

Tobias Jonsson (born 29 February 1996) is a Swedish Paralympic athlete who competes in international track and field competitions, he competes in long jump and was a former sprinter. He is a World silver medalist and a two-time European silver medalist in the long jump.

Tobias is the younger brother of Per Jonsson, the brothers both competed at the 2012 and 2016 Summer Paralympics.
