= 2011 IPC Athletics World Championships – Men's 200 metres =

The men's 200 metres at the 2011 IPC Athletics World Championships was held at the QEII Stadium from 22 to 29 January

== Medalists ==
Class	Gold	Silver	Bronze
T11	Lucas Prado; Brazil	Daniel Silva; Brazil	Elexis Gillette; United States
T12	Mateusz Michalski; Poland	Luis Goncalves; Portugal	Maximiliano Rodriguez; Spain
T13	Alexey Labzin; Russia	Hussein Kadhim; Iraq	Ahmadreza Kazemi; Iran
T34	Mohamed Hammadi; United Arab Emirates	Sebastien Mobre; France	Austin Pruitt; United States
T35	Teboho Mokgalagadi; South Africa	Allel Boukhalfa; Algeria	Ivan Otleykin; Russia
T36	Roman Pavlyk; Ukraine	Wa Wai So; Hong Kong	Ben Rushgrove; Great Britain
T37	Sofiane Hamdi; Algeria	Fanie van der Merwe; South Africa	Mostafa Fathalla Mohamed; Egypt
T38	Evan O'Hanlon; Australia	Mohamed Farhat Chida; Tunisia	Wenjun Zhou; China
T42	Richard Whitehead; Great Britain	Clavel Kayitare; France	Atsushi Yamamoto; Japan
T44	Oscar Pistorius; South Africa	Jerome Singleton; United States	Arnu Fourie; South Africa
T46	Antonis Aresti; Cyprus	Yohansson Nascimento; Brazil	Simon Patmore; Australia
T51	Edgar Navarro; Mexico	Pieter du Preez; South Africa	Toni Piispanen; Finland
T52	Beat Boesch; Switzerland	Salvador Hernandez; Mexico	Tomoya Ito; Japan
T53	Huzhao Li; China	Brent Lakatos; Canada	Michael Bushell; Great Britain
T54	Supachai Koysub; Thailand	Leo Pekka Tahti; Finland	Yanfeng Cui; China

== T11 ==
The Men's 200 metres, T11 was held on January 28 and 29

T11 = visual impairment: may range from no light perception in either eye, to light perception with the inability to recognise the shape of a hand.

=== Results ===
KEY:	q	Fastest non-qualifiers	Q	Qualified	SB	Seasonal best

==== Heats ====
Qualification: First 1 in each heat(Q) and the next 2 fastest(q) advance to the final.

Rank	Heat	Name	Nationality	Time	Notes
1	2	Lucas Prado	Brazil	23.18	Q
2	1	Daniel Silva	Brazil	23.50	Q, SB
3	2	Elexis Gillette	United States	23.84	q, SB
4	1	Andrey Koptev	Russia	24.08	q
5	1	Gauthier Tresor Makunda	France	24.28	
6	1	Ananias Shikongo	Namibia	24.95	
7	2	Firmino Baptista	Portugal	24.99	

==== Final ====
Rank	Name	Nationality	Time	Notes
1st place, gold medalist(s)	Lucas Prado	Brazil	22.97	CR
2nd place, silver medalist(s)	Daniel Silva	Brazil	23.12	SB
3rd place, bronze medalist(s)	Elexis Gillette	United States	23.74	SB
4	Andrey Koptev	Russia	23.89	

Key: SB = Season Best, CR = Championship Record

== T12 ==
The Men's 200 metres, T12 was held on January 27 and 29

T12 = may recognise the shape of a hand, have a visual acuity of 2/60 and/or visual field of less than 5 degrees.

=== Results ===
KEY:	q	Fastest non-qualifiers	Q	Qualified

==== Heats ====
Qualification: First 1 in each heat(Q) and the next 1 fastest(q) advance to the final.

Rank	Heat	Name	Nationality	Time	Notes
1	3	Mateusz Michalski	Poland	21.92	Q
2	3	Maximiliano Rodriguez	Spain	22.15	q
3	1	Hilton Keith Langenhoven	South Africa	22.25	Q, CR
4	2	Luis Goncalves	Portugal	22.42	Q, SB
5	1	Artem Loginov	Russia	22.46	SB
6	3	Matthias Schroeder	Germany	22.58	
7	2	Rza Osmanov	Azerbaijan	22.69	SB
8	3	Gabriel Potra	Portugal	22.97	
9	2	Gerard Desgarrega Puigdevall	Spain	23.46	SB
10	1	Hyacinthe Deleplace	France	23.53	
11	1	Elchin Muradov	Azerbaijan	23.95	
	2	Josiah Jamison	United States	DNS	

Key: DNS = did not start, SB = Season Best, CR = Championship Record

==== Final ====
Rank	Name	Nationality	Time	Notes
1st place, gold medalist(s)	Mateusz Michalski	Poland	22.02	
2nd place, silver medalist(s)	Luis Goncalves	Portugal	22.57	
3rd place, bronze medalist(s)	Maximiliano Rodriguez	Spain	22.84	
4	Hilton Keith Langenhoven	South Africa	DNS	

Key: DNS = did not start

== T13 ==
The Men's 200 metres, T13 was held on January 27

T13 = visual impairment: visual acuity ranges from 2/60 to 6/60 and/or has a visual field of more than 5 degrees and less than 20 degrees.

=== Results ===
KEY:	q	Fastest non-qualifiers	Q	Qualified

==== Heats ====
Qualification: First 3 in each heat(Q) and the next 2 fastest(q) advance to the final.

Rank	Heat	Name	Nationality	Time	Notes
1	1	Ndodomzi Jonathan Ntutu	South Africa	22.77	Q
2	1	Hussein Kadhim	Iraq	22.93	Q
3	1	Alexey Labzin	Russia	23.02	Q, SB
4	2	Ahmadreza Kazemi	Iran	23.10	Q
5	2	Markeith Price	United States	23.76	Q
6	1	Martin Amutenya Aloisius	Namibia	23.93	q
7	2	Songwut Lamsan	Thailand	24.02	Q
8	2	Taeil Oh	South Korea	25.03	q
	2	Henry Nzungi Mwendo	Kenya	DQ	R 163.3

Key: DQ = Disqualified, SB = Season Best, R 163.3 = Leaving the lane

==== Final ====
Rank	Name	Nationality	Time	Notes
1st place, gold medalist(s)	Alexey Labzin	Russia	22.49	SB
2nd place, silver medalist(s)	Hussein Kadhim	Iraq	22.82	
3rd place, bronze medalist(s)	Ahmadreza Kazemi	Iran	23.46	
4	Markeith Price	United States	23.68	
5	Songwut Lamsan	Thailand	23.88	
6	Martina Amutenya Aloisius	Namibia	23.96	
7	Taeil Oh	South Korea	25.57	
8	Ndodomzi Jonathan Ntutu	South Africa	DQ	R 163.3

Key: SB = Season Best, DQ = Disqualified

== T34 ==
The Men's 200 metres, T34 was held on January 22 and 23

T34 = good functional strength, minimal limitation or control problems in the arms or trunk, compete in a wheelchair or from a throwing frame.

=== Results ===
KEY:	q	Fastest non-qualifiers	Q	Qualified	CR	Championship Record

==== Heats ====
Qualification: First 3 in each heat(Q) and the next 2 fastest(q) advance to the final.

Rank	Heat	Name	Nationality	Time	Notes
1	2	Sebastien Mobre	France	29.94	Q
2	1	Austin Pruitt	United States	32.53	Q
3	1	Mohamed Hammadi	United Arab Emirates	32.68	Q
4	1	Stefan Rusch	Netherlands	32.73	Q
5	2	Janne Seppala	Finland	33.67	Q
6	2	Henk Schuiling	Netherlands	33.71	Q
7	2	Bart Pijs	Netherlands	33.92	q
8	2	Ahmad Almutairi	Kuwait	34.80	q, CR
9	1	Masaki Hirooka	Japan	35.89	

==== Final ====
Rank	Name	Nationality	Time	Notes
1st place, gold medalist(s)	Mohamed Hammadi	United Arab Emirates	30.14	
2nd place, silver medalist(s)	Sebastien Mobre	France	30.39	
3rd place, bronze medalist(s)	Austin Pruitt	United States	31.14	
4	Henk Schuiling	Netherlands	33.67	
5	Bart Pijs	Netherlands	34.06	
6	Janne Seppala	Finland	35.20	
7	Ahmad Almutairi	Kuwait	35.29	
	Stefan Rusch	Netherlands	DQ	R 163.3

Key: R 163.3 = Leaving the lane, DQ = disqualified

== T35 ==
The Men's 200 metres, T35 was held on January 22

T35 = good static balance, problems in dynamic balance. May need assistive device for walking, not when standing.

=== Results ===
==== Final ====
Rank	Name	Nationality	Time	Notes
1st place, gold medalist(s)	Teboho Mokgalagadi	South Africa	27.59	
2nd place, silver medalist(s)	Allel Boukhalfa	Algeria	27.87	
3rd place, bronze medalist(s)	Ivan Otleykin	Russia	27.98	
4	Niels Stein	Germany	28.68	
5	Andrey Antipov	Russia	29.12	
6	Hugues Quiatol	France	30.82	
7	Pedro Marquez Jr. Villanueva	Mexico	31.92	

== T36 ==
The Men's 200 metres, T36 was held on January 26 and 27

T36 = walk without assistance or assistive devices, more control problems with upper than lower limbs. All four limbs are involved, dynamic balance often better than static balance.

=== Results ===
KEY:	q	Fastest non-qualifiers	Q	Qualified

==== Heats ====
Qualification: First 3 in each heat(Q) and the next 2 fastest(q) advance to the final.

Rank	Heat	Name	Nationality	Time	Notes
1	1	Ben Rushgrove	Great Britain	25.49	Q, SB
2	2	Graeme Ballard	Great Britain	25.63	Q
3	1	Roman Pavlyk	Ukraine	25.86	Q
4	2	Wa Wai So	Hong Kong	26.05	Q, SB
5	2	Mian Che	China	26.09	Q
6	1	Marcin Mielczarek	Poland	26.15	Q, SB
7	2	Hossam Sewalem	Egypt	26.20	q, AR
8	1	Andrey Zhirnov	Russia	26.53	q
9	2	Mohd Raduan Emeari	Malaysia	27.15	
10	2	Tommy Chasanoff	United States	27.27	AR
	1	Xu Ran	China	DNF	

Key: SB = Season Best, AR = Area Record, DNF = did not finish

==== Final ====
Rank	Name	Nationality	Time	Notes
1st place, gold medalist(s)	Roman Pavlyk	Ukraine	24.47	
2nd place, silver medalist(s)	Wa Wai So	Hong Kong	24.71	
3rd place, bronze medalist(s)	Ben Rushgrove	Great Britain	25.27	
4	Mian Che	China	25.30	
5	Graeme Ballard	Great Britain	25.42	
6	Marcin Mielczarek	Poland	25.84	
7	Hossam Sewalem	Egypt	26.35	
8	Andrey Zhirnov	Russia	26.39	

== T37 ==
The Men's 200 metres, T37 was held on January 25 and 26

T37 = spasticity in an arm and leg on the same side, good functional ability on the other side, better development, good arm and hand control.

=== Results ===
KEY:	q	Fastest non-qualifiers	Q	Qualified	AR	Area record	SB	Seasonal best

==== Heats ====
Qualification: First 3 in each heat(Q) and the next 2 fastest(q) advance to the final.

Rank	Heat	Name	Nationality	Time	Notes
1	1	Omar Monterola	Venezuela	24.16	Q, AR
2	2	Sofiane Hamdi	Algeria	24.17	Q
3	1	Fanie van der Merwe	South Africa	24.26	Q
4	1	Roman Kapranov	Russia	24.37	Q, AR
5	2	Mostafa Fathalla Mohamed	Egypt	24.64	Q
6	2	Sen Yang	China	25.25	Q
7	1	Yuxi Ma	China	25.33	q
8	2	Andrea Dalle Ave	South Africa	25.51	q, SB
9	1	Sergii Kravchenko	Ukraine	26.13	
10	1	Mariano Dominguez	Argentina	26.45	
11	1	Dmitrijs Silovs	Latvia	27.07	
12	2	Ali Alansari	United Arab Emirates	27.17	
	2	Alexandr Lyashchenko	Russia	DQ	R 162.7

Key: 162.7 = False start, DQ = disqualified

==== Final ====
Rank	Name	Nationality	Time	Notes
1st place, gold medalist(s)	Sofiane Hamdi	Algeria	23.64	WR
2nd place, silver medalist(s)	Fanie van der Merwe	South Africa	23.67	
3rd place, bronze medalist(s)	Mostafa Fathalla Mohamed	Egypt	23.76	SB
4	Roman Kapranov	Russia	23.88	AR
5	Omar Monterola	Venezuela	24.17	
6	Sen Yang	China	24.98	SB
7	Yuxi Ma	China	25.13	
8	Andrea Dalle Ave	South Africa	25.50	SB

Key: WR = World Record, SB = Season Best, AR = Area Record

== T38 ==
The Men's 200 metres, T38 was held on January 25 and 26

T38 = meet the minimum disability criteria for athletes with cerebral palsy, head injury or stroke, a limitation in function that impacts on sports performance.

=== Results ===
KEY:	q	Fastest non-qualifiers	Q	Qualified	SB	Seasonal best	=CR|Equal Championship Record

==== Heats ====
Qualification: First 3 in each heat(Q) and the next 2 fastest(q) advance to the final.

Rank	Heat	Name	Nationality	Time	Notes
1	2	Evan O'Hanlon	Australia	23.03	Q, =CR
2	1	Mohamed Farhat Chida	Tunisia	23.87	Q, SB
3	1	Wenjun Zhou	China	23.90	Q
4	2	Edson Pinheiro	Brazil	24.02	Q
5	1	Tim Sullivan	Australia	24.07	Q, SB
6	2	Andriy Onufriyenko	Ukraine	24.10	Q, SB
7	2	Aliaksandr Pankou	Belarus	24.67	q, SB
8	1	Paulo Pereira	Brazil	24.92	q
9	2	Kyle Edward Whitehouse	Canada	24.99	
10	1	Evgeny Kurochkin	Russia	25.28	
11	2	Juan Ramon Carrapiso Martinez	Spain	25.74	
	1	Mykyta Senyk	Ukraine	DQ	R 162.7

Key: R 162.7 = False start, DQ = Disqualified

==== Final ====
Rank	Name	Nationality	Time	Notes
1st place, gold medalist(s)	Evan O'Hanlon	Australia	22.31	CR
2nd place, silver medalist(s)	Mohamed Farhat Chida	Tunisia	22.86	SB
3rd place, bronze medalist(s)	Wenjun Zhou	China	23.33	AR
4	Tim Sullivan	Australia	23.79	SB
5	Edson Pinheiro	Brazil	23.89	
6	Andriy Onufriyenko	Ukraine	24.23	
7	Aliaksandr Pankou	Belarus	24.87	
8	Paulo Pereira	Brazil	25.01	

Key: CR = Championship Record, SB = Season Best, AR = Area Record

== T42 ==
The Men's 200 metres, T42 was held on January 23 and 24

T42 = single above knee amputation or equivalent impairment.

=== Results ===
KEY:	q	Fastest non-qualifiers	Q	Qualified

==== Heats ====
Qualification: First 3 in each heat(Q) and the next 2 fastest(q) advance to the final.

Rank	Heat	Name	Nationality	Time	Notes
?	1	Kortney Clemons	United States		
?	2	Bernhard Haarhoff	South Africa		
?	1	Daniel Jorgensen	Denmark		
?	2	Clavel Kayitare	France		
?	1	Heinrich Popow	Germany		
?	2	Scott Reardon	Australia		
?	1	Richard Whitehead	Great Britain		
?	1	Atsushi Yamamoto	Japan		
	2	Wojtek Czyz	Germany		

==== Final ====
Rank	Name	Nationality	Time	Notes
1st place, gold medalist(s)	Richard Whitehead	Great Britain	25.88	CR
2nd place, silver medalist(s)	Clavel Kayitare	France	26.54	
3rd place, bronze medalist(s)	Atsushi Yamamoto	Japan	26.92	AR
4	Heinrich Popow	Germany	26.92	
5	Scott Reardon	Australia	28.39	
6	Daniel Jorgensen	Denmark	28.70	SB
7	Kortney Clemons	United States	29.22	SB
8	Bernhard Haarhoff	South Africa	30.58	AR

Key: CR = Championship Record, SB = Season Best, AR = Area Record

== T44 ==
The Men's 200 metres, T44 was held on January 23 and 24

T44 = single below knee amputation, or equivalent impairment.

Also T43 classified athletes competed in this event: double below knee amputations or equivalent impairments.

=== Results ===
KEY:	q	Fastest non-qualifiers	Q	Qualified	AR	Area record	SB	Seasonal best

==== Heats ====
Qualification: First 3 in each heat(Q) and the next 2 fastest(q) advance to the final.

Rank	Heat	Name	Nationality	Time	Notes
1	1	Oscar Pistorius	South Africa	22.52	Q
2	1	David Behre	Germany	23.30	Q, AR
3	2	Jerome Singleton	United States	23.38	Q, SB
4	2	Arnu Fourie	South Africa	23.61	Q
5	1	Ian Jones	Great Britain	23.84	Q
5	1	Blake Leeper	United States	23.84	Q
7	2	David Prince	United States	23.91	Q
8	2	Jean-Baptiste Alaize	France	25.03	q
9	2	Jun Haruta	Japan	26.43	
	1	Andre Oliveira	Brazil	DNF	
	1	Christoph Bausch	Switzerland	DQ	R 163.3
	2	Robert Mayer	Austria	DQ	R 162.7
	2	Alan Fonteles Cardoso Oliveira	Brazil	DQ	R 162.7

Key: R 163.3 = Leaving the lane, R 162.7 = False start, DNF = did not finish, DQ = disqualified

==== Final ====
Rank	Name	Nationality	Time	Notes
1st place, gold medalist(s)	Oscar Pistorius	South Africa	21.80	
2nd place, silver medalist(s)	Jerome Singleton	United States	22.77	SB
3rd place, bronze medalist(s)	Arnu Fourie	South Africa	22.82	AR
4	David Behre	Germany	23.14	AR
5	David Prince	United States	23.53	SB
6	Blake Leeper	United States	23.65	SB
7	Ian Jones	Great Britain	23.70	
8	Jean-Baptiste Alaize	France	25.51	

Key: SB = Season Best, AR = Area Record

== T46 ==
The Men's 200 metres, T46 was held on January 23 and 24

T46 = single above or below elbow amputation or equivalent impairment.

Also T45 classified athletes competed in this event: double arm amputations above or below the elbow or equivalent impairment.

Yohansson Nascimento set a world record for athletes with a T45 classification, with a time of 22.35.

=== Results ===
KEY:	q	Fastest non-qualifiers	Q	Qualified	SB	Seasonal best

==== Heats ====
Qualification: First 3 in each heat(Q) and the next 2 fastest(q) advance to the final.

Rank	Heat	Name	Nationality	Time	Notes
1	1	Simon Patmore	Australia	22.52	Q
2	2	Antonis Aresti	Cyprus	22.73	Q, SB
3	1	Yohansson Nascimento	Brazil	22.99	Q
4	2	Emicarlo Souza	Brazil	23.12	Q
5	2	Yury Nosulenko	Russia	23.15	Q
5	2	Ni Guo	China	23.17	q
7	1	Fadhil Al-Dabbagh	Iraq	23.22	Q, SB
8	1	Samkelo Mike Radebe	South Africa	23.27	q
9	2	Manuel Cortajerena	Argentina	24.00	
10	1	Fengguang Luo	China	25.49	
	2	Antonio Souza	Brazil	DNS	

Key: DNS = did not start

==== Final ====
Rank	Name	Nationality	Time	Notes
1st place, gold medalist(s)	Antonis Aresti	Cyprus	22.25	SB
2nd place, silver medalist(s)	Yohansson Nascimento	Brazil	22.35	WR
3rd place, bronze medalist(s)	Simon Patmore	Australia	22.43	SB
4	Yury Nosulenko	Russia	22.89	
5	Fadhil Al-Dabbagh	Iraq	23.00	AR
6	Emicarlo Souza	Brazil	23.08	
7	Samkelo Mike Radebe	South Africa	23.16	
8	Ni Guo	China	23.26	

Key: WR = World Record, AR = Area Record, SB = Season Best

== T51 ==
The Men's 200 metres, T51 was held on January 22

T51 = a weakness in shoulder function, can bend but not straighten the elbow joint, no trunk or leg function, no movement in the fingers, can bend wrists backwards but not forwards.

=== Results ===
==== Final ====
Rank	Name	Nationality	Time	Notes
1st place, gold medalist(s)	Edgar Cesareo Navarro Sanchez	Mexico	42.97	CR
2nd place, silver medalist(s)	Pieter du Preez	South Africa	47.15	
3rd place, bronze medalist(s)	Toni Piispanen	Finland	49.19	
4	Kevin Stokes	United States	52.43	
5	Mohamed Berrahal	Algeria	56.19	
6	Jeremy Finton	United States	1:04.79	

Key: CR = Championship Record

== T52 ==
The Men's 200 metres, T52 was held on January 22

T52 = good shoulder, elbow and wrist function, poor to normal finger flexion and extension, no trunk or leg function.

=== Results ===
==== Final ====
Rank	Name	Nationality	Time	Notes
1st place, gold medalist(s)	Beat Boesch	Switzerland	32.54	
2nd place, silver medalist(s)	Salvador Hernandez Mondragon	Mexico	32.64	
3rd place, bronze medalist(s)	Tomoya Ito	Japan	32.80	
4	Thomas Geierspichler	Austria	33.59	
5	Paul Nitz	United States	33.66	SB
6	Sam McIntosh	Australia	34.31	
7	Marcos Castillo	Venezuela	34.86	
	Josh Roberts	United States	DQ	R 163.3

Key: SB = Season Best, DQ = Disqualified, R 163.3 = Leaving the lane

== T53 ==
The Men's 200 metres, T53 was held on January 25 and 26

T53 = normal upper limb function, no abdominal, leg or lower spinal function.

=== Results ===
KEY:	q	Fastest non-qualifiers	Q	Qualified	SB	Seasonal best

==== Heats ====
Qualification: First 3 in each heat(Q) and the next 2 fastest(q) advance to the final.

Rank	Heat	Name	Nationality	Time	Notes
1	2	Brent Lakatos	Canada	27.19	Q
2	2	Huzhao Li	China	27.58	Q, SB
3	2	Ariosvaldo Fernandes Silva	Brazil	27.66	Q
4	2	Michael Bushell	Great Britain	27.76	q
5	1	Dong Ho Jung	South Korea	27.76	Q
5	2	Sopa Intasen	Thailand	28.00	q
7	1	Eric Gauthier	Canada	28.52	Q
8	1	Richard Colman	Australia	28.70	Q
9	1	Pichet Krungget	Thailand	28.75	
10	1	Brian Siemann	United States	28.91	
	1	Jaime Ramirez Valencia	Mexico	DQ	R 163.3

Key: DQ = Disqualified, R 163.3 = Leaving the lane

==== Final ====
Rank	Name	Nationality	Time	Notes
1st place, gold medalist(s)	Huzhao Li	China	26.64	CR
2nd place, silver medalist(s)	Brent Lakatos	Canada	26.93	
3rd place, bronze medalist(s)	Michael Bushell	Great Britain	27.11	
4	Ariosvaldo Fernandes Silva	Brazil	27.35	
5	Richard Colman	Australia	27.48	
6	Dong Ho Jung	South Korea	27.52	
7	Eric Gauthier	Canada	27.89	
8	Sopa Intasen	Thailand	27.98	

Key: CR = Championship Record

== T54 ==
The Men's 200 metres, T54 was held on January 24, 25 and 26

T54 = normal upper limb function, partial to normal trunk function, may have significant function of the lower limbs.

=== Results ===
KEY:	q	Fastest non-qualifiers	Q	Qualified	SB	Seasonal best

==== Heats ====
Qualification: First 3 in each heat(Q) and the next 4 fastest(q) advance to the final.

Rank	Heat	Name	Nationality	Time	Notes
1	4	Kenny van Weeghel	Netherlands	25.74	Q
2	1	Supachai Koysub	Thailand	25.90	Q
3	3	Marc Schuh	Germany	25.99	Q
4	2	Leo Pekka Tahti	Finland	26.11	Q
5	3	Yanfeng Cui	China	26.23	Q
6	2	Jordan Bird	United States	26.30	Q
7	3	Curtis Thom	Canada	26.50	Q
8	4	Mohammad Vahdani	United Arab Emirates	26.51	Q
9	4	Thiago Souza	Brazil	26.56	Q
10	2	Niklas Almers	Sweden	26.59	Q
11	1	Kai Zong	China	26.61	Q
12	4	Yoshifumi Nagao	Japan	26.82	q
13	4	Alejandro Maldonado	Argentina	26.83	q, SB
14	2	Sukman Hong	South Korea	27.01	q
15	4	Freddy Sandoval	Mexico	27.01	q
16	3	Richard Nicholson	Australia	27.19	
17	1	Jasim Alnaqbi	United Arab Emirates	27.47	Q
18	2	Matthew Cameron	Australia	27.56	
19	1	Andreas Ottosson	Sweden	27.57	
20	4	Samuel Harrison Carter	Australia	27.64	
21	2	Giandomenico Sartor	Italy	28.80	
22	3	Esa-Pekka Mattila	Finland	28.81	
23	3	Ryan Chalmers	United States	28.95	
24	3	Mohamed Bani Hashem	United Arab Emirates	29.32	
5	1	Alexandre Dupont	Canada	29.72	
26	1	Sean Burns	United States	33.02	
	4	Colin Mathieson	Canada	DQ	R 163.3
	1	Maamar Rachif	Algeria	DQ	R 163.3
	3	Pedro Gandarilla Fernandez	Mexico	DQ	R 163.3
	2	Fernando Sanchez Nava	Mexico	DQ	R 163.3
	2	Oscar Alvarenga Torres	Costa Rica	DQ	R 163.3
	1	Marcel Hug	Switzerland	DQ	R 162.7,125.5

Key: DQ = Disqualified, R 163.3 = Leaving the lane, 162.7 = False start, 125.5 = Warning by unsporting manner

==== Semifinals ====
Qualification: First 3 in each heat(Q) and the next 2 fastest(q) advance to the final.

Rank	Heat	Name	Nationality	Time	Notes
1	2	Kenny van Weeghel	Netherlands	25.70	Q
2	1	Supachai Koysub	Thailand	25.73	Q
3	2	Jordan Bird	United States	25.88	Q
4	1	Yanfeng Cui	China	25.97	Q, SB
5	1	Marc Schuh	Germany	26.01	Q
5	2	Leo Pekka Tahti	Finland	26.03	Q
7	2	Curtis Thom	Canada	26.61	q
8	1	Niklas Almers	Sweden	26.70	q
9	1	Mohammad Vahdani	United Arab Emirates	26.84	
10	1	Sukman Hong	South Korea	26.87	
11	2	Jasim Alnaqbi	United Arab Emirates	27.15	SB
12	2	Yoshifumi Nagao	Japan	27.16	R
13	1	Alejandro Maldonado	Argentina	27.35	
14	2	Freddy Sandoval	Mexico	27.46	
	1	Thiago Souza	Brazil		DQ, R 163.3
	2	Kai Zong	China		DQ, R 163.3

Key: SB = Season Best, DQ = Disqualified, R = IAAF rule, 163.3 = Leaving the lane

==== Final ====
Rank	Name	Nationality	Time	Notes
1st place, gold medalist(s)	Supachai Koysub	Thailand	25.23	SB
2nd place, silver medalist(s)	Leo Pekka Tahti	Finland	25.25	SB
3rd place, bronze medalist(s)	Yanfeng Cui	China	25.68	SB
4	Kenny van Weeghel	Netherlands	25.80	
5	Jordan Bird	United States	26.01	
6	Marc Schuh	Germany	26.08	
7	Curtis Thom	Canada	26.51	
8	Niklas Almers	Sweden	26.58	

Key: SB = Season Best

== See also ==
- List of IPC world records in athletics
