= 2011 IPC Athletics World Championships – Men's 100 metres =

The men's 100 metres at the 2011 IPC Athletics World Championships were held at the QEII Stadium from 22–26 January.

== Medalists ==
Class	Gold	Silver	Bronze
T11	Lucas Prado; Brazil	Andrey Koptev; Russia	Daniel Silva; Brazil
T12	Mateusz Michalski; Poland	Elchin Muradov; Azerbaijan	Josiah Jamison; United States
T13	Alexey Labzin; Russia	Ndodomzi Jonathan Ntutu; South Africa	Ioannis Protos; Greece
T34	Sebastien Mobre; France	Mohamed Hammadi; United Arab Emirates	Stefan Rusch; Netherlands
T35	Teboho Mokgalagadi; South Africa	Allel Boukhalfa; Algeria	Niels Stein; Germany
T36	So Wa Wai; Hong Kong	Ben Rushgrove; Great Britain	Roman Pavlyk; Ukraine
T37	Mostafa Fathalla Mohamed; Egypt	Fanie van der Merwe; South Africa	Sofiane Hamdi; Algeria
T38	Evan O'Hanlon; Australia	Zhou Wenjun; China	Edson Pinheiro; Brazil
T42	Heinrich Popow; Germany	Clavel Kayitare; France	Atsushi Yamamoto; Japan
T44	Jerome Singleton; United States	Oscar Pistorius; South Africa	Alan Fonteles Cardoso Oliveira; Brazil
T46	Yohansson Nascimento; Brazil	Ni Guo; China	Arnaud Assoumani; France
T51	Edgar Navarro; Mexico	Toni Piispanen; Finland	Pieter du Preez; South Africa
T52	Salvador Hernandez Mondragon; Mexico	Beat Bösch; Switzerland	Paul Nitz; United States
T53	Li Huzhao; China	Michael Bushell; Great Britain	Brent Lakatos; Canada
T54	Leo Pekka Tahti; Finland	Saichon Konjen; Thailand	Kenny van Weeghel; Netherlands

== T11 ==
The Men's 100 metres, T11 was held on January 22–23 and the medal ceremony on 24

T11 = visual impairment - range from no light perception, to light perception with the inability to recognise the shape of a hand.

=== Results ===
KEY:	q	Fastest non-qualifiers	Q	Qualified

==== Heats ====
Qualification: First 1 in each heat(Q) and the next 1 fastest(q) advance to the final.

Rank	Heat	Name	Nationality	Time	Notes
1	3	Lucas Prado	Brazil	11.41	Q, =CR
2	2	Andrey Koptev	Russia	11.48	Q
3	2	Daniel Silva	Brazil	11.60	q
4	2	Elexis Gillette	United States	11.63	
5	1	Gauthier Tresor Makunda	France	11.91	Q
5	3	Xavier Porras	Spain	12.15	
7	1	Firmino Baptista	Portugal	12.24	
8	2	Ananias Shikongo	Namibia	12.31	
9	1	Jakkit Punthong	Thailand	12.52	
	3	Alexis Acosta	Argentina	12.53	

Key: =CR = Equal Championship Record

==== Final ====
Rank	Name	Nationality	Time	Notes
1st place, gold medalist(s)	Lucas Prado	Brazil	11.38	CR
2nd place, silver medalist(s)	Andrey Koptev	Russia	11.54	
3rd place, bronze medalist(s)	Daniel Silva	Brazil	11.59	SB
4	Gauthier Tresor Makunda	France	11.87	

Key: CR = Championship Record, SB = Season Best

== T12 ==
=== Results ===
The Men's 100 metres, T13 was held on January 26

T12 = may recognise the shape of a hand, have a visual acuity of 2/60 and/or visual field of less than 5 degrees.

==== Heats ====
Qualification: First 1 in each heat (Q) and the next 1 fastest (q) advance to the final.

Rank	Heat	Name	Nationality	Time	Notes
1	1	Mateusz Michalski	Poland	11.01	Q, CR
2	3	Elchin Muradov	Azerbaijan	11.36	Q
3	3	Josiah Jamison	United States	11.44	q
4	2	Rza Osmanov	Azerbaijan	11.50	Q
5	2	Gabriel Potra	Poland	11.51	
6	1	Li Yansong	China	11.54	
7	1	Bekzod Khodjaev	Uzbekistan	12.09	
8	3	Artem Loginov	Russia	DQ	R 162.7
9	2	Maximiliano Rodríguez	Spain	DQ	R 162.7,125.5

Key: CR = Championship Record

==== Final ====
Rank	Name	Nationality	Time	Notes
1st place, gold medalist(s)	Mateusz Michalski	Poland	11.05	
2nd place, silver medalist(s)	Elchin Muradov	Azerbaijan	11.26	
3rd place, bronze medalist(s)	Josiah Jamison	United States	11.39	
4	Rza Osmanov	Azerbaijan	11.52	

== T13 ==
=== Results ===
The Men's 100 metres, T13 was held on January 23 and 24

T13 = visual impairment: visual acuity ranges from 2/60 to 6/60 and/or has a visual field of more than 5 degrees and less than 20 degrees.

==== Heats ====
Qualification: First 3 in each heat (Q) and the next 2 fastest (q) advance to the final.

Rank	Heat	Name	Nationality	Time	Notes
1		Ndodomzi Jonathan Ntutu	South Africa	11.18	Q
2		Alexey Labzin	Russia	11.23	Q, SB
3		Yizhi Yuan	China	11.24	Q, SB
4		Ioannis Protos	Greece	11.40	Q
5		Radoslav Zlatanov	Bulgaria	11.41	Q
6		Hussein Kadhim	Iraq	11.53	Q
7		Ivan Stoev	Bulgaria	11.78	q
8		Songwut Lamsan	Thailand	11.87	q
9		Oh Taeil	South Korea	12.47	
10		Henry Nzungi Mwendo	Kenya	DQ	R 162.7

Key: SB = Season Best

==== Final ====
Rank	Name	Nationality	Time	Notes
1st place, gold medalist(s)	Alexey Labzin	Russia	11.09	SB
2nd place, silver medalist(s)	Ndodomzi Jonathan Ntutu	South Africa	11.11	=AR
3rd place, bronze medalist(s)	Ioannis Protos	Greece	11.25	
4	Radoslav Zlatanov	Bulgaria	11.30	
5	Hussein Kadhim	Iraq	11.53	
6	Ivan Stoev	Bulgaria	11.72	
7	Songwut Lamsan	Thailand	11.91	

Key: =AR = Equal Continental Record, SB = Season Best

== T34 ==
The Men's 100 metres, T34 was held on January 24 and 25

T34 = good functional strength, minimal limitation or control problems in the arms or trunk, compete in a wheelchair or from a throwing frame.

=== Results ===
==== Heats ====
Qualification: First 3 in each heat (Q) and the next 2 fastest (q) advance to the final.

Rank	Heat	Name	Nationality	Time	Notes
1	1	Sebastien Mobre	France	16.53	Q, CR
2	2	Stefan Rusch	Netherlands	17.72	Q
3	2	Mohamed Hammadi	United Arab Emirates	17.95	Q
4	2	Austin Pruitt	United States	18.11	Q
5	1	Bart Pijs	Netherlands	18.13	Q, SB
6	1	Henk Schuiling	Netherlands	18.52	Q
7	2	Janne Seppala	Finland	18.66	q
8	1	Ahmad Almutairi (T33)	Kuwait	18.98	q, CR
9	2	Masaki Hirooka	Japan	19.96	
10	1	Damien Bowen	Australia	21.72	SB

Key: CR = Championship Record, SB = Season Best

==== Final ====
Rank	Name	Nationality	Time	Notes
1st place, gold medalist(s)	Sebastien Mobre	France	16.84	
2nd place, silver medalist(s)	Mohamed Hammadi	United Arab Emirates	16.95	AR
3rd place, bronze medalist(s)	Stefan Rusch	Netherlands	17.65	SB
4	Austin Pruitt	United States	18.12	
5	Bart Pijs	Netherlands	18.14	
6	Henk Schuiling	Netherlands	18.31	
7	Janne Seppala	Finland	18.70	
8	Ahmad Almutairi (T33)	Kuwait	19.18	

Key: AR = Continental Record, SB = Season Best

== T35 ==
The Men's 100 metres, T13 was held on January 24

T35 = good static balance, problems in dynamic balance. May need assistive device for walking, not when standing.

=== Results ===
==== Final ====
Rank	Name	Nationality	Time	Notes
1st place, gold medalist(s)	Teboho Mokgalagadi	South Africa	12.96	CR
2nd place, silver medalist(s)	Allel Boukhalfa	Algeria	13.38	SB
3rd place, bronze medalist(s)	Niels Stein	Germany	13.59	SB
4	Ivan Otleykin	Russia	14.06	
5	Ioannis Letkas	Greece	14.14	SB
6	Andrey Antipov	Russia	14.26	SB
7	Hugues Quiatol	France	14.36	
8	Pedro Marquez Jr. Villanueva	Mexico	15.17	

Key: CR = Championship Record, SB = Season Best

== T36 ==
The Men's 100 metres, T36 was held on January 23 and 24

T36 = walk without assistance or assistive devices, more control problems with upper than lower limbs. All four limbs are involved, dynamic balance often better than static balance.

=== Results ===
==== Heats ====
Qualification: First 3 in each heat (Q) and the next 2 fastest (q) advance to the final.

Rank	Heat	Name	Nationality	Time	Notes
1	2	So Wa Wai	Hong Kong	12.46	Q, SB
2	2	Benjamin Rushgrove	Great Britain	12.48	Q, SB
3	1	Graeme Ballard	Great Britain	12.66	Q
4	2	Che Mian	China	12.74	Q
5	1	Roman Pavlyk	Ukraine	12.77	Q
6	1	Marcin Mielczarek	Poland	12.82	Q
7	1	Hossam Sewalem	Egypt	13.00	q
8	1	Xu Ran	China	13.10	q
9	2	Mohd Raduan Emeari	Malaysia	13.23	
10	2	Andrey Zhirnov	Russia	13.26	
11	2	Anastasios Petropoulos	Greece	13.54	

Key: SB = Season Best

==== Final ====
Rank	Name	Nationality	Time	Notes
1st place, gold medalist(s)	So Wa Wai	Hong Kong	12.17	CR
2nd place, silver medalist(s)	Benjamin Rushgrove	Great Britain	12.25	AR
3rd place, bronze medalist(s)	Roman Pavlyk	Ukraine	12.26	SB
4	Che Mian	China	12.39	SB
5	Graeme Ballard	Great Britain	12.57	
6	Marcin Mielczarek	Poland	12.58	SB
7	Hossam Sewalem	Egypt	12.78	AR
8	Xu Ran	China	12.83	

Key: CR = Championship Record, AR = Continental Record, SB = Season Best

== T37 ==
The Men's 100 metres, T37 was held on January 23 and 24

T37 = spasticity in an arm and leg on the same side, good functional ability on the other side, better development, good arm and hand control.

=== Results ===
==== Heats ====
Qualification: First 3 in each heat (Q) and the next 2 fastest (q) advance to the final.

Rank	Heat	Name	Nationality	Time	Notes
1	1	Mostafa Fathalla Mohamed	Egypt	11.64	Q, WR
2	1	Fanie Van Der Merwe	South Africa	11.84	Q
3	1	Omar Monterola	Venezuela	11.84	Q, AR
4	1	Roman Kapranov	Russia	12.02	q, AR
5	2	Sofiane Hamdi	Algeria	12.21	Q
6	2	Ma Yuxi	China	12.26	Q
7	2	Alexandr Lyashchenko	Russia	12.31	Q, SB
8	1	Yang Sen	China	12.38	q, SB
9	2	Andrea Dalle Ave	South Africa	12.48	
10	2	Vladislav Barinov	Russia	12.58	
11	2	Sergii Kravchenko	Ukraine	12.69	
12	1	Benjamin Ivan Cardozo Sanchez	Mexico	12.79	SB
13	2	Ali Alansari	United Arab Emirates	13.45	

Key: CR = Championship Record, AR = Continental Record, SB = Season Best

==== Final ====
Rank	Name	Nationality	Time	Notes
1st place, gold medalist(s)	Mostafa Fathalla Mohamed	Egypt	11.61	WR
2nd place, silver medalist(s)	Fanie Van Der Merwe	South Africa	11.69	SB
3rd place, bronze medalist(s)	Sofiane Hamdi	Algeria	11.86	
4	Roman Kapranov	Russia	12.08	
5	Alexandr Lyashchenko	Russia	12.28	SB
6	Yang Sen	China	12.30	SB
7	Ma Yuxi	China	12.40	
	Omar Monterola	Venezuela	DNS	

Key: WR = World Record, SB = Season Best

== T38 ==
The Men's 100 metres, T38 was held on January 23 and 24

T38 = meet the minimum disability criteria for athletes with cerebral palsy, head injury or stroke, a limitation in function that impacts on sports performance.

=== Results ===
==== Heats ====
Qualification: First 3 in each heat (Q) and the next 2 fastest (q) advance to the final.

Rank	Heat	Name	Nationality	Time	Notes
1		Evan O'Hanlon	Australia	11.21	Q, CR
2		Mohamed Farhat Chida	Tunisia	11.64	Q, SB
3		Edson Pinheiro	Brazil	11.68	Q
4		Zhou Wenjun	China	11.70	Q
5		Mykyta Senyk	Ukraine	11.98	Q, SB
6		Kyle Edward Whitehouse	Canada	12.25	Q, SB
7		Aliaksandr Pankou	Belarus	12.37	q, SB
8		Evgeny Kurochkin	Russia	12.50	q
9		Paulo Pereira	Brazil	12.52	SB
10		Chris Mullins	Australia	12.56	
11		Juan Ramon Carrapiso Martinez	Spain	12.66	
12		Mitchell Pink	Australia	12.85	SB

Key: CR = Championship Record, SB = Season Best

==== Final ====
Rank	Name	Nationality	Time	Notes
1st place, gold medalist(s)	Evan O'Hanlon	Australia	11.14	CR
2nd place, silver medalist(s)	Zhou Wenjun	China	11.42	
3rd place, bronze medalist(s)	Edson Pinheiro	Brazil	11.76	
4	Mykyta Senyk	Ukraine	11.95	SB
5	Kyle Edward Whitehouse	Canada	12.36	
6	Aliaksandr Pankou	Belarus	12.37	
7	Evgeny Kurochkin	Russia	12.79	
8	Mohamed Farhat Chida	Tunisia	DQ	R 162.7

Key: CR = Championship Record, SB = Season Best, R 162.7 = False start

== T42 ==
The Men's 100 metres, T42 was held on January 26

T42 = single above knee amputation or equivalent impairment.

=== Results ===
==== Final ====
Rank	Name	Nationality	Time	Notes
1st place, gold medalist(s)	Heinrich Popow	Germany	12.56	CR
2nd place, silver medalist(s)	Clavel Kayitare	France	12.60	SB
3rd place, bronze medalist(s)	Atsushi Yamamoto	Japan	13.06	
4	Scott Reardon	Australia	13.45	
5	Daniel Jorgensen	Denmark	13.76	SB
6	Kortney Clemons	United States	14.35	SB
7	Bernhard Haarhoff	South Africa	15.09	AR

Key: CR = Championship Record, AR = Continental Record, SB = Season Best

== T44 ==
The Men's 100 metres, T44 was held on January 25 and 26

American Jerome Singleton won the race, causing South African Oscar Pistorius to lose an international 100 metres race for the first time in seven years.

T44 = single below knee amputation or equivalent impairment.

Also T43 classified athletes competed in this event: double below knee amputations or equivalent impairments.

=== Results ===
KEY:	q	Fastest non-qualifiers	Q	Qualified	SB	Season Best

==== Heats ====
Qualification: First 2 in each heat(Q) and the next 2 fastest(q) advance to the final.

Rank	Heat	Name	Nationality	Time	Notes
1	1	Oscar Pistorius	South Africa	11.33	Q
2	1	Jerome Singleton	United States	11.35	Q, SB
3	2	Arnu Fourie	South Africa	11.41	Q
4	3	Alan Fonteles Cardoso Oliveira	Brazil	11.60	Q
5	3	Blake Leeper	United States	11.63	q
5	3	Jonathan Peacock	Great Britain	11.63	Q, SB
7	2	Jim Bob Bizzell	United States	11.71	Q
8	2	David Behre	Germany	11.79	q
9	3	Christoph Bausch	Switzerland	11.91	SB
10	1	Markus Rehm	Germany	12.13	
11	1	Jean-Baptiste Alaize	France	12.14	
12	1	Andre Oliveira	Brazil	12.15	SB
13	3	Ronald Hertog	Netherlands	12.38	
14	2	Robert Mayer	Austria	12.44	
15	3	Jack Swift	Australia	12.51	SB
16	1	Junfeng Shang	China	12.65	
17		Jun Haruta	Japan	12.68	

==== Final ====
Rank	Name	Nationality	Time	Notes
1st place, gold medalist(s)	Jerome Singleton	United States	11.34	SB
2nd place, silver medalist(s)	Oscar Pistorius	South Africa	11.34	
3rd place, bronze medalist(s)	Alan Fonteles Cardoso Oliveira	Brazil	11.43	
4	Arnu Fourie	South Africa	11.43	
5	Blake Leeper	United States	11.57	SB
6	Jonathan Peacock	Great Britain	11.89	
7	David Behre	Germany	11.96	
	Jim Bob Bizzell	United States	DQ	R 162.7

Key: SB = Season Best, R 162.7 = False start

== T46 ==
The Men's 100 metres, T46 was held on January 25 and 26

T46 = single above or below elbow amputation or equivalent impairments.

Also T45 classified athletes competed in this event: double arm amputations above or below the elbow or equivalent impairments.

=== Results ===
KEY:	q	Fastest non-qualifiers	Q	Qualified	SB	Season Best

==== Heats ====
Qualification: First 3 in each heat(Q) and the next 2 fastest(q) advance to the final.

Rank	Heat	Name	Nationality	Time	Notes
1	2	Francis Kompaon	Papua New Guinea	11.36	Q
2	1	Arnaud Assoumani	France	11.38	Q
3	2	Simon Patmore	Australia	11.38	Q
4	2	Xu Zhao	China	11.42	Q
5	1	Ni Guo	China	11.44	Q
5	1	Wei He	China	11.50	Q
7	1	Samkelo Mike Radebe (T45)	South Africa	11.51	q
8	2	Yohansson Nascimento (T45)	Brazil	11.52	q
9	1	Yury Nosulenko	Russia	11.52	
10	1	Manuel Cortajerena	Argentina	11.89	
11	2	Lucas Ezequiel Schonfeld	Argentina	11.93	SB
12	1	Markanda Reddy	India	12.09	
13	2	Florin Marius Cojoc	Romania	12.11	
	1	Kimou Addoh	Ivory Coast	DNS	
	2	Kouame Jean-Luc Noumbo	Ivory Coast	DNS	

Key: DNS = Did not Start

==== Final ====
Rank	Name	Nationality	Time	Notes
1st place, gold medalist(s)	Yohansson Nascimento (T45)	Brazil	11.01	WR
2nd place, silver medalist(s)	Ni Guo	China	11.13	CR
3rd place, bronze medalist(s)	Arnaud Assoumani	France	11.18	SB
4	Xu Zhao	China	11.23	SB
5	Francis Kompaon	Papua New Guinea	11.27	SB
6	Samkelo Mike Radebe (T45)	South Africa	11.27	
7	Wei He	China	11.33	SB
	Simon Patmore	Australia	DQ	R 162.7

Key: WR = World Record, CR = Championship Record, SB = Season Best, DQ = Disqualified, R 162.7 = False start

== T51 ==
The Men's 100 metres, T53 was held on January 28 and 29

T51 = a weakness in shoulder function, can bend but not straighten the elbow joint, no trunk or leg function, no movement in the fingers, can bend wrists backwards but not forwards.

=== Results ===
==== Final ====
Rank	Name	Nationality	Time	Notes
1st place, gold medalist(s)	Edgar Navarro Sanchez	Mexico	22.27	CR
2nd place, silver medalist(s)	Toni Piispanen	Finland	22.71	SB
3rd place, bronze medalist(s)	Pieter du Preez	South Africa	23.49	SB
4	Kevin Stokes	United States	26.29	
5	Mohamed Berrahal	Algeria	27.76	
6	Jeremy Finton	United States	30.59	

Key: CR = Championship Record, SB = Season Best

== T52 ==
The Men's 100 metres, T52 was held on January 28 and 29

T52 = good shoulder, elbow and wrist function, poor to normal finger flexion and extension, no trunk or leg function.

=== Results ===
==== Final ====
Rank	Name	Nationality	Time	Notes
1st place, gold medalist(s)	Salvador Hernandez Mondragon	Mexico	17.29	CR
2nd place, silver medalist(s)	Beat Boesch	Switzerland	17.74	
3rd place, bronze medalist(s)	Paul Nitz	United States	18.19	SB
4	Tomoya Ito	Japan	18.39	AR
5	Sam McIntosh	Australia	18.52	AR
6	Josh Roberts	United States	19.72	

Key: CR = Championship Record, AR = Continental Record, SB = Season Best

== T53 ==
The Men's 100 metres, T53 was held on January 22 and 23

T53 = normal upper limb function, no abdominal, leg or lower spinal function.

=== Results ===
==== Heats ====
Qualification: First 3 in each heat (Q) and the next 2 fastest (q) advance to the final.

Rank	Heat	Name	Nationality	Time	Notes
1		Michael Bushell	Great Britain	15.24	Q
2		Brent Lakatos	Canada	15.36	Q
3		Jung Dong Ho	South Korea	15.51	Q
4		Li Huzhao	China	15.53	Q
5		Ariosvaldo Fernandes Silva	Brazil	15.55	Q
6		Sopa Intasen	Thailand	15.80	q
7		Eric Gauthier	Canada	16.10	Q
8		Pichet Krungget	Thailand	16.18	q
9		Brian Siemann	United States		
10		Jaime Ramirez Valencia	Mexico		

==== Final ====
Rank	Name	Nationality	Time	Notes
1st place, gold medalist(s)	Li Huzhao	China	14.82	CR
2nd place, silver medalist(s)	Michael Bushell	Great Britain	14.86	
3rd place, bronze medalist(s)	Brent Lakatos	Canada	15.07	
4	Ariosvaldo Fernandes Silva	Brazil	15.46	
5	Sopa Intasen	Thailand	15.66	
6	Jung Dong Ho	South Korea	15.99	
7	Eric Gauthier	Canada	16.04	
8	Pichet Krungget	Thailand	16.29	

Key: WR = World Record, CR = Championship Record, AR = Continental Record, PB = Personal Best, SB = Season Best

== T54 ==
The Men's 100 metres, T13 was held on January 28 and 29

T54 = normal upper limb function, partial to normal trunk function, may have significant function of the lower limbs.

=== Results ===
==== Heats ====
Qualification: First 3 in each heat (Q) and the next 4 fastest (q) advance to the semifinals.

Rank	Heat	Name	Nationality	Time	Notes
1	1	Leo Pekka Tahti	Finland	14.19	Q, CR
2	1	Supachai Koysub	Thailand	14.37	Q
3	4	Kenny van Weeghel	Netherlands	14.51	Q
4	3	Saichon Konjen	Thailand	14.61	Q
5	1	Li Meng	China	14.79	Q
6	3	Marc Schuh	Germany	14.82	Q
7	3	Zong Kai	China	14.97	Q
8	4	Liu Yang	China	15.08	Q
9	4	Freddy Sandoval	Mexico	15.11	Q
10	3	Colin Mathieson	Canada	15.18	q
11	2	Mohammad Vahdani	United Arab Emirates	15.18	Q
12	3	Niklas Almers	Sweden	15.21	q
13	3	Juan Pablo Cervantes Garcia	Mexico	15.40	Q
14	2	Pedro Gandarilla Fernandez	Mexico	15.40	q
15	4	Esa-Pekka Mattila	Finland	15.41	q
16	2	Andreas Ottosson	Sweden	15.42	Q
17	2	Curtis Thom	Canada	15.56	
18	1	Maamar Rachif	Algeria	15.59	
19	4	Thiago Souza	Brazil	15.59	
20	4	Jasim Alnaqbi	United Arab Emirates	15.62	
21	2	Matthew Cameron	Australia	15.69	
22	1	Juan Valladares	Venezuela	15.74	
23	4	Samuel Harrison Carter	Australia	15.88	
24	2	Muhammad Firdaus Nordin	Singapore	15.88	
25	3	Alejandro Maldonado	Argentina	15.95	
26	1	Richard Nicholson	Australia	16.04	
27	3	Mohamed Bani Hashem	United Arab Emirates	16.32	
28	2	Giandomenico Sartor	Italy	16.65	
29	1	Oscar Alvarenga Torres	Costa Rica	16.82	
30	2	Jose Jimenez	Costa Rica	16.97	
31	1	Sean Burns	United States	18.53	
	4	Marcel Hug	Switzerland	DQ	R 162.7

Key: CR = Championship Record, R 162.7 = False start

==== Semifinals ====
Qualification: First 3 in each heat (Q) and the next 2 fastest (q) advance to the final.

Rank	Heat	Name	Nationality	Time	Notes
1		Leo Pekka Tahti	Finland	14.17	Q, CR
2		Kenny van Weeghel	Netherlands	14.59	Q
3		Saichon Konjen	Thailand	14.65	Q
4		Marc Schuh	Germany	14.81	Q
5		Li Meng	China	14.84	Q
6		Liu Yang	China	14.87	q
7		Zong Kai	China	14.87	q
8		Colin Mathieson	Canada	14.96	Q
9		Freddy Sandoval	Mexico	15.07	
10		Juan Pablo Cervantes Garcia	Mexico	15.10	
11		Mohammad Vahdani	United Arab Emirates	15.18	
12		Niklas Almers	Sweden	15.19	
13		Pedro Gandarilla Fernandez	Mexico	15.31	
14		Andreas Ottosson	Sweden	15.32	
15		Esa-Pekka Mattila	Finland	15.53	
		Supachai Koysub	Thailand	DQ	R 162.7

Key: CR = Championship Record, R 162.7 = False start

==== Final ====
Rank	Name	Nationality	Time	Notes
1st place, gold medalist(s)	Leo Pekka Tahti	Finland	14.14	CR
2nd place, silver medalist(s)	Saichon Konjen	Thailand	14.41	
3rd place, bronze medalist(s)	Kenny van Weeghel	Netherlands	14.47	
4	Zong Kai	China	14.70	
5	Li Meng	China	14.73	
6	Liu Yang	China	14.82	
7	Colin Mathieson	Canada	14.93	
8	Marc Schuh	Germany	15.05	

Key: CR = Championship Record

== See also ==
- 2011 IPC Athletics World Championships – Men's pentathlon
- List of IPC world records in athletics
