= 2011 IPC Athletics World Championships – Men's 400 metres =

The men's 400 metres at the 2011 IPC Athletics World Championships is held at the QEII Stadium on 22-23 and 26–29 January

== Medalists ==
Class	Gold	Silver	Bronze
T11	Lucas Prado; Brazil	Daniel Silva; Brazil	Ananias Shikongo; Namibia
T12	Luis Goncalves; Portugal	Matthias Schroeder; Germany	Gerard Desgarrega; Spain
T13	Alexander Zverev; Russia	Ioannis Protos; Greece	Abdelillah Mame; Morocco
T34	Mohamed Hammadi; United Arab Emirates	Sebastien Mobre; France	Stefan Rusch; Netherlands
T36	Paul Blake; Great Britain	Andrey Zhirnov; Russia	Roman Pavlyk; Ukraine
T37	Roman Kapranov; Russia	Sofiane Hamdi; Algeria	Fanie Van Der Merwe; South Africa
T38	Mohamed Farhat Chida; Tunisia	Evan O'Hanlon; Australia	Tim Sullivan; Australia
T44	Oscar Pistorius; South Africa	David Behre; Germany	David Prince; United States
T46	Antonis Aresti; Cyprus	Guenther Matzinger; Austria	Samuel Colmenares; Venezuela
T52	Tomoya Ito; Japan	Hirokazu Ueyonabaru; Japan	Thomas Geierspichler; Austria
T53	Huzhao Li; China	Richard Colman; Australia	Byunghoon Yoo; South Korea
T54	Liu Chengming; China	Marcel Hug; Switzerland	Marc Schuh; Germany

== T11 ==
The Men's 400 metres, T11 was held on January 26–27

T11 = visual impairment - range from no light perception, to light perception with the inability to recognise the shape of a hand.

=== Results ===
KEY:	q	Fastest non-qualifiers	Q	Qualified	SB|Season Best

==== Heats ====
Qualification: First 1 in each heat(Q) and the next 2 fastest(q) advance to the final.

Rank	Heat	Name	Nationality	Time	Notes
1	2	Lucas Prado	Brazil	51.74	Q
2	1	Daniel Silva	Brazil	52.07	Q, SB
3	1	Ananias Shikongo	Namibia	54.36	q
4	1	Dustin Riley Walsh	Canada	55.31	q
5	2	Jonathan Peter Dunkerley	Canada	56.20	
6	2	William Sosa	Colombia	57.11	SB
7	1	Firmino Baptista	Portugal	DQ	R 164.2.2

==== Final ====
Rank	Name	Nationality	Time	Notes
1st place, gold medalist(s)	Lucas Prado	Brazil	51.19	CR
2nd place, silver medalist(s)	Daniel Silva	Brazil	51.45	SB
3rd place, bronze medalist(s)	Ananias Shikongo	Namibia	53.90	
4	Dustin Riley Walsh	Canada	55.01	

Key: CR = Championship Record, SB = Season Best

== T12 ==
The Men's 400 metres, T12 was held on January 22 and 23

T12 = visual impairment - may be able to recognise the shape of a hand and have a visual acuity of 2/60 and/or visual field of less than 5 degrees.

=== Results ===
KEY:	q	Fastest non-qualifiers	Q	Qualified

==== Heats ====
Qualification: First 1 in each heat(Q) and the next 1 fastest(q) advance to the final.

Rank	Heat	Name	Nationality	Time	Notes
1	1	Luis Goncalves	Portugal	50.90	Q
2	3	Matthias Schroeder	Germany	51.15	Q
3	1	Gerard Desgarrega Puigdevall	Spain	51.85	q
4	2	Redouane Merah	Algeria	51.89	Q
5	1	Fredor Trikolich	Russia	52.33	
6	2	José Alves	Portugal	54.11	
7	3	Hyacinthe Deleplace	France	54.54	
8	2	Yansong Li	China	54.73	
	3	Josiah Jamison	United States	DNF	

==== Final ====
Rank	Name	Nationality	Time	Notes
1st place, gold medalist(s)	Luis Goncalves	Portugal	49.83	
2nd place, silver medalist(s)	Matthias Schroeder	Germany	50.96	
3rd place, bronze medalist(s)	Gerard Desgarrega Puigdevall	Spain	51.88	SB
4	Redouane Merah	Algeria	52.33	

Key: SB = Season Best

== T13 ==
The Men's 400 metres, T13 was held on January 28 and 29

T13 = visual impairment: visual acuity ranges from 2/60 to 6/60 and/or has a visual field of more than 5 degrees and less than 20 degrees.

=== Results ===
==== Heats ====
Qualification: First 3 in each heat (Q) and the next 2 fastest (q) advance to the final.

Rank	Heat	Name	Nationality	Time	Notes
1	1	Ioannis Protos	Greece	50.96	Q
2	1	Alexander Zverev	Russia	52.11	Q
3	2	Abdelillah Mame	Morocco	52.24	Q
4	1	Ahmadreza Kazemi	Iran	52.51	Q
5	2	Dmitrii Kornilov	Russia	53.22	Q
6	2	Ndodomzi Jonathan Ntutu	South Africa	53.36	Q
7	2	Martina Amutenya Aloisius	Namibia	53.40	q
8	2	Oh Taeil	South Korea	59.51	q
	1	Henry Nzungi Mwendo	Kenya	DQ	R 163.3
	1	Markeith Price	United States	DQ	R 163.3

Key: R 163.3 = Leaving the lane

==== Final ====
Rank	Name	Nationality	Time	Notes
1st place, gold medalist(s)	Alexander Zverev	Russia	49.41	CR
2nd place, silver medalist(s)	Ioannis Protos	Greece	49.74	SB
3rd place, bronze medalist(s)	Abdelillah Mame	Morocco	50.45	SB
4	Ndodomzi Jonathan Ntutu	South Africa	51.09	SB
5	Dmitrii Kornilov	Russia	52.87	
5	Martina Amutenya Aloisius	Namibia	53.91	
7	Oh Taeil	South Korea	1:01.53	
	Ahmadreza Kazemi	Iran	DNS	

Key: CR = Championship Record, SB = Season Best

== T34 ==
The Men's 400 metres, T34 was held on January 27

T34 = good functional strength with minimal limitation in arms or trunk. Compete in a wheelchair.

=== Results ===
==== Final ====
Rank	Name	Nationality	Time	Notes
1st place, gold medalist(s)	Mohamed Hammadi	United Arab Emirates	56.20	SB
2nd place, silver medalist(s)	Sebastien Mobre	France	57.81	SB
3rd place, bronze medalist(s)	Stefan Rusch	Netherlands	1:02.55	SB
4	Henk Schuiling	Netherlands	1:02.99	
5	Ahmad Almutairi	Kuwait	1:04.12	CR
6	Bart Pijs	Netherlands	1:04.83	SB
7	Janne Seppala	Finland	1:04.83	
	Austin Pruitt	United States	DQ	R 163.3

Key: CR = Championship Record, SB = Season Best, R 163.3 = Leaving the lane

== T36 ==
=== Results ===
The Men's 400 metres, T36 was held on January 28 and 29

T36 = walk without assistance or assistive devices, more control problems with upper than lower limbs. All four limbs are involved, dynamic balance often better than static balance.

==== Heats ====
Qualification: First 3 in each heat (Q) and the next 2 fastest (q) advance to the final.

Rank	Heat	Name	Nationality	Time	Notes
1	2	Paul Blake	Great Britain	57.96	Q
2	1	Andrey Zhirnov	Russia	58.48	Q
3	1	Aliaksandr Daniliuk	Belarus	59.25	Q
4	2	Hossam Sewalem	Egypt	1:00.57	Q
5	1	Roman Pavlyk	Ukraine	1:00.74	Q
6	2	Artem Arefyev	Russia	1:00.81	Q
7	1	Allel Boukhalfa	Algeria	1:01.21	q, WR
8	2	Tommy Chasanoff	United States	1:01.29	q
9	2	Panagiotis Manetas	Greece	1:01.47	
10	1	Che Mian	China	DQ	R 162.7, 125.5

Key: WR = World Record

==== Final ====
Rank	Name	Nationality	Time	Notes
1st place, gold medalist(s)	Paul Blake	Great Britain	56.93	SB
2nd place, silver medalist(s)	Andrey Zhirnov	Russia	58.03	
3rd place, bronze medalist(s)	Roman Pavlyk	Ukraine	58.80	
4	Artem Arefyev	Russia	59.02	
5	Hossam Sewalem	Egypt	59.89	AR
5	Allel Boukhalfa	Algeria	1:00.55	WR
7	Tommy Chasanoff	United States	1:02.17	
8	Aliaksandr Daniliuk	Belarus	DQ	R 162.7

Key: WR = World Record, AR= Continental Record

== T37 ==
=== Results ===
The Men's 400 metres, T37 was held on January 29

T37 = spasticity in an arm and leg on the same side, good functional ability on the other side, better development, good arm and hand control.

==== Final ====
Rank	Name	Nationality	Time	Notes
1st place, gold medalist(s)	Roman Kapranov	Russia	52.71	CR
2nd place, silver medalist(s)	Sofiane Hamdi	Algeria	52.85	AR
3rd place, bronze medalist(s)	Fanie Van Der Merwe	South Africa	53.99	
4	Brad Scott	Australia	54.59	AR
5	Alexandr Lyashchenko	Russia	56.35	SB
5	Mariano Dominguez	Argentina	56.91	AR
7	Ali Alansari	United Arab Emirates	1:02.74	

Key: CR = Championship Record, AR= Continental Record, PB = Personal Best, SB = Season Best

== T38 ==
=== Results ===
The Men's 400 metres, T38 was held on January 28 and 29

T38 = meet the minimum disability criteria for athletes with cerebral palsy, head injury or stroke, a limitation in function that impacts on sports performance.

==== Heats ====
Qualification: First 3 in each heat (Q) and the next 2 fastest (q) advance to the final.

Rank	Heat	Name	Nationality	Time	Notes
1		Paulo Pereira	Brazil	55.14	Q, SB
2		Mohamed Farhat Chida	Tunisia	56.40	Q
3		Tim Sullivan	Australia	56.80	Q
4		Juan Ramon Carrapiso Martinez	Spain	58.86	Q, SB
5		Edson Pinheiro	Brazil	59.70	Q
6		Chris Mullins	Australia	1:02.36	Q
7		Evan O'Hanlon	Australia	1:02.91	q
		Zhou Wenjun	China	DNF	
		Andriy Onufriyenko	Ukraine	DQ	R 162.7

Key: SB = Season Best

==== Final ====
Rank	Name	Nationality	Time	Notes
1st place, gold medalist(s)	Mohamed Farhat Chida	Tunisia	49.33	WR
2nd place, silver medalist(s)	Evan O'Hanlon	Australia	49.72	AR
3rd place, bronze medalist(s)	Tim Sullivan	Australia	53.42	SB
4	Paulo Pereira	Brazil	54.53	AR
5	Edson Pinheiro	Brazil	55.42	SB
5	Chris Mullins	Australia	55.44	
7	Juan Ramon Carrapiso Martinez	Spain	57.88	SB

Key: WR = World Record, AR = Continental Record, SB = Season Best

== T44 ==
The Men's 400 metres, T44 was held on January 29

T44 = single below knee amputation, or equivalent impairment.

Also T43 classified athletes competed in this event: double below knee amputations or equivalent impairments.

=== Results ===
==== Final ====
Rank	Name	Nationality	Time	Notes
1st place, gold medalist(s)	Oscar Pistorius	South Africa	48.37	
2nd place, silver medalist(s)	David Behre	Germany	51.40	SB
3rd place, bronze medalist(s)	David Prince	United States	52.35	SB
4	Jack Swift	Australia	56.76	SB
5	Blake Leeper	United States	1:00.15	
6	Daniel Rizzieri	United States	1:06.25	
	Ian Jones	Great Britain	DNF	

Key: SB = Season Best

== T46 ==
=== Results ===
The Men's 400 metres, T46 was held on January 28 and 29

T46 = single above or below elbow amputation or equivalent impairment.

==== Final ====
Rank	Name	Nationality	Time	Notes
1st place, gold medalist(s)	Antonis Aresti	Cyprus	49.44	AR
2nd place, silver medalist(s)	Guenther Matzinger	Germany	49.80	
3rd place, bronze medalist(s)	Samuel Colmenares	Venezuela	50.26	SB
4	Emicarlo Souza	Brazil	51.32	
5	Yury Nosulenko	Russia	51.76	
5	Hamza Rehouni	Algeria	52.80	
7	Sandeep Singh Singh	India	54.50	

Key: AR = Continental Record, SB = Season Best

== T52 ==
=== Results ===
The Men's 400 metres, T52 was held on January 28 and 29

T52 = good shoulder, elbow and wrist function, poor to normal finger flexion and extension, no trunk or leg function.

==== Final ====
Rank	Name	Nationality	Time	Notes
1st place, gold medalist(s)	Tomoya Ito	Japan	1:00.17	CR
2nd place, silver medalist(s)	Hirokazu Ueyonabaru	Japan	1:01.77	
3rd place, bronze medalist(s)	Thomas Geierspichler	Austria	1:02.34	
4	Toshihiro Takada	Japan	1:02.88	
5	Salvador Hernandez Mondragon	Mexico	1:03.41	
5	Beat Boesch	Switzerland	1:03.96	
7	Josh Roberts	Australia	1:05.10	SB
8	Sam McIntosh	Australia	1:08.96	

Key: CR = Championship Record, SB = Season Best

== T53 ==
=== Results ===
The Men's 400 metres, T53 was held on January 28 and 29

T53 = normal upper limb function, no abdominal, leg or lower spinal function.

==== Heats ====
Qualification: First 3 in each heat (Q) and the next 2 fastest (q) advance to the final.

Rank	Heat	Name	Nationality	Time	Notes
1	2	Richard Colman	Australia	51.24	Q, CR
2	2	Jung Dong Ho	South Korea	51.72	Q
3	1	Yoo Byunghoon	South Korea	51.78	Q
4	1	Li Huzhao	China	52.49	Q
5	2	Jun Hiromichi	Japan	52.53	Q
6	1	Michael Bushell	Great Britain	53.01	Q
7	1	Sopa Intasen	Thailand	53.14	q
8	2	Brian Siemann	United States	53.16	q, SB
9	1	Pierre Fairbank	France	53.30	
10	2	Pichet Krungget	Thailand	53.42	
11	1	Ariosvaldo Fernandes Silva	Brazil	53.64	
12	2	Eric Gauthier	Canada	53.67	
13	2	Jaime Ramirez Valencia	Mexico	53.96	

Key: CR = Championship Record, SB = Season's Best

==== Final ====
Rank	Name	Nationality	Time	Notes
1st place, gold medalist(s)	Li Huzhao	China	49.86	CR
2nd place, silver medalist(s)	Richard Colman	Australia	49.93	AR
3rd place, bronze medalist(s)	Yoo Byunghoon	South Korea	51.31	
4	Jung Dong Ho	South Korea	53.45	
5	Jun Hiromichi	Japan	53.64	
5	Sopa Intasen	Thailand	53.69	
7	Brian Siemann	United States	54.18	
8	Michael Bushell	Great Britain	54.58	

Key: CR = Championship Record, AR = Continental Record

== T54 ==
=== Results ===
The Men's 400 metres, T13 was held on January 28 and 29

T54 = normal upper limb function, partial to normal trunk function, may have significant function of the lower limbs.

==== Heats ====
Qualification: First 3 in each heat (Q) and the next 4 fastest (q) advance to the semi-finals.

Rank	Heat	Name	Nationality	Time	Notes
1	3	Marcel Hug	Switzerland	48.70	Q
2	4	Saichon Konjen	Thailand	48.80	Q
3	2	Liu Chengming	China	49.05	Q
4	4	Maamar Rachif	Algeria	49.36	Q
5	3	Leo Pekka Tahti	Finland	49.49	Q
6	3	Colin Mathieson	Canada	49.77	Q
7	2	Supachai Koysub	Thailand	49.89	Q
8	4	Hong Sukman	South Korea	50.07	Q
9	4	Jake Christopher Lappin	Australia	50.14	q
10	1	Marc Schuh	Germany	50.14	Q
11	2	Cui Yanfeng	China	50.23	Q
12	3	Mohammad Vahdani	United Arab Emirates	50.26	q
13	3	Li Meng	China	50.41	q
14	1	Jordan Bird	United States	50.78	Q
15	2	Alejandro Maldonado	Argentina	50.95	q
16	4	Alexandre Dupont	Canada	51.14	
17	1	Niklas Almers	Sweden	51.45	Q
18	1	Richard Nicholson	Australia	51.57	
19	1	Matthew Lack	New Zealand	51.63	
20	2	Julien Casoli	France	52.41	
21	3	Ekkachai Janthon	Thailand	52.95	
22	1	Juan Pablo Cervantes Garcia	Mexico	53.09	
23	1	Curtis Thom	Canada	53.23	
24	2	Samuel Harrison Carter	Australia	53.93	
25	2	Freddy Sandoval	Mexico	54.31	
26	2	Jose Jimenez	Costa Rica	59.60	
27	3	Sean Burns	United States	1:04.72	
28	4	Yoshifumi Nagao	Japan	DQ	R 163.3
29	4	Giandomenico Sartor	Italy	DQ	R 163.3
30	4	Mohamed Bani Hashem	United Arab Emirates	DQ	R 162.7
31	3	Fernando Sanchez Nava	Mexico	DQ	R 163.3

==== Semifinals ====
Qualification: First 3 in each heat (Q) and the next 2 fastest (q) advance to the final.

Rank	Heat	Name	Nationality	Time	Notes
1	1	Liu Chengming	China	47.60	Q, CR
2	2	Marcel Hug	Switzerland	47.77	Q
3	2	Maamar Rachif	Algeria	48.17	Q, SB
4	2	Marc Schuh	Germany	48.17	Q
5	1	Supachai Koysub	Thailand	48.21	Q, SB
6	1	Cui Yanfeng	China	48.36	Q, SB
7	1	Hong Sukman	South Korea	48.41	q
8	1	Saichon Konjen	Thailand	48.63	q
9	2	Jordan Bird	United States	48.81	
10	2	Colin Mathieson	Canada	49.00	
11	1	Leo Pekka Tahti	Finland	49.08	SB
12	2	Jake Christopher Lappin	Australia	49.84	
13	2	Alejandro Maldonado	Argentina	50.21	
14	1	Li Meng	China	50.40	SB
15	1	Mohammad Vahdani	United Arab Emirates	51.19	
16	2	Niklas Almers	Sweden	DQ	R 163.3

Key: CR = Championship Record, SB = Season Best, R 163.3 = Leaving the lane

==== Final ====
Rank	Name	Nationality	Time	Notes
1st place, gold medalist(s)	Liu Chengming	China	47.95	
2nd place, silver medalist(s)	Marcel Hug	Switzerland	48.16	
3rd place, bronze medalist(s)	Marc Schuh	Germany	48.34	
4	Maamar Rachif	Algeria	48.56	
5	Cui Yanfeng	China	48.73	
5	Saichon Konjen	Thailand	48.80	
7	Supachai Koysub	Thailand	48.97	
8	Hong Sukman	South Korea	DQ	R 163.2

== See also ==
- List of IPC world records in athletics
