= Athletics at the 2008 Summer Paralympics – Men's 100 metres T35 =

The Men's 100m T35 had its Final held on September 13 at 18:00.

== Medalists ==
Gold	Sen Yang; China
Silver	Xinhan Fu; China
Bronze	Teboho Mokgalagadi; South Africa

== Results ==
Place	Athlete	Final
1	Sen Yang (CHN)	12.29 WR
2	Xinhan Fu (CHN)	12.55
3	Teboho Mokgalagadi (RSA)	12.82
4	Sergii Slynko (UKR)	12.83
5	Jon Oddur Halldorsson (ISL)	12.83
6	Allel Boukhalfa (ALG)	13.59
7	Niels Stein (GER)	13.70
8	Hugues Quiatol (FRA)	14.12
9	Ioannis Letkas (GRE)	14.15
