= Evan O'Hanlon =

Australian Paralympic athlete (born 1988)

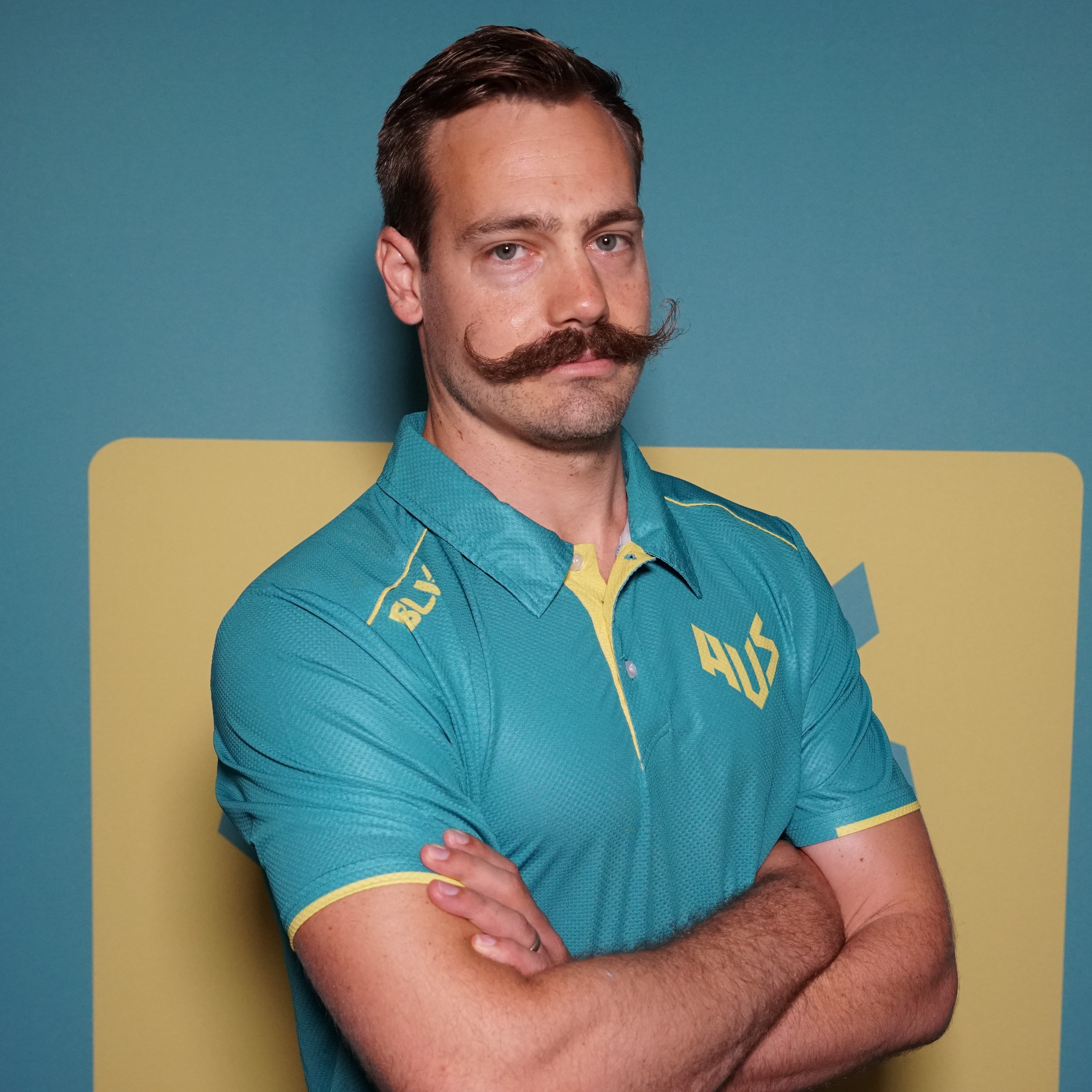
- 2016 Australian Paralympic team portrait of O'Hanlon

Personal information
- Full name: Evan George O'Hanlon
- Nationality: Australian
- Born: 4 May 1988 (age 38) Sydney, New South Wales
- Height: 184 cm (72 in)
- Weight: 89 kg (196 lb)
- Website: evanohanlon.com
Medal record
Men's paralympic athletics
Representing Australia
Paralympic Games
Gold medal – first place	2008 Beijing	100 m T38
Gold medal – first place	2008 Beijing	200 m T38
Gold medal – first place	2008 Beijing	4 × 100 m T35–38
Gold medal – first place	2012 London	100 m T38
Gold medal – first place	2012 London	200 m T38
Silver medal – second place	2016 Rio de Janeiro	100 m T38
Bronze medal – third place	2020 Tokyo	100 m T38
IPC World Championships
Gold medal – first place	2006 Assen	4 × 100 m T35–38
Gold medal – first place	2006 Assen	4 × 400 m T35–38
Gold medal – first place	2011 Christchurch	100 m T38
Gold medal – first place	2011 Christchurch	200 m T38
Gold medal – first place	2013 Lyon	100 m T38
Gold medal – first place	2013 Lyon	200 m T38
Gold medal – first place	2013 Lyon	400 m T38
Gold medal – first place	2017 London	100 m T38
Silver medal – second place	2011 Christchurch	400 m T38
Bronze medal – third place	2006 Assen	200 m T38
Bronze medal – third place	2011 Christchurch	4 × 100 m T35–38
Bronze medal – third place	2019 Doha	100 m T38
Commonwealth Games
Gold medal – first place	2018 Gold Coast	100 m T38
Gold medal – first place	2022 Birmingham	100 m T37/38

Evan George O'Hanlon, OAM (born 4 May 1988) is an Australian Paralympic athlete, who competes mainly in category T38 sprint events. He has won five gold medals at two Paralympic Games – 2008 Beijing and 2012 London. He also represented Australia at the 2016 Rio Paralympics and 2020 Tokyo Paralympics, winning a silver medal and a bronze medal respectively. In winning the bronze medal in the Men's 100m T38 at the 2019 World Para Athletics Championships in Dubai, O'Hanlon became Australia's most successful male athlete with a disability. His bronze medal took him to 12 medals in five world championships – one more than four-time Paralympian Neil Fuller.

== Personal ==
O'Hanlon was born on 4 May 1988 in Sydney, New South Wales. He is 183 centimetres (6.00 ft) tall and weighs 78 kilograms (172 lb). He has cerebral palsy due to a prenatal stroke. He attended St Joseph's College, Hunters Hill. He has five sisters, one of whom, Elsa, rowed for Australia's national team and won the World University lightweight sculling Championship in Trakai, Lithuania in 2006.

His father, Terry O'Hanlon, is a former Australian representative rowing coxswain, a six time Australian champion who represented twice at World Rowing Championships. His mother Jane, also represented Australia as a member of a national rowing squad.

O'Hanlon studied landscape architecture at the University of Canberra. He is married to Zuzana Schindlerová, a Czech Republic race walker. After the Rio Paralympics, he moved to Sydney to work part-time in the family's architecture business.

== Competitive athletics ==
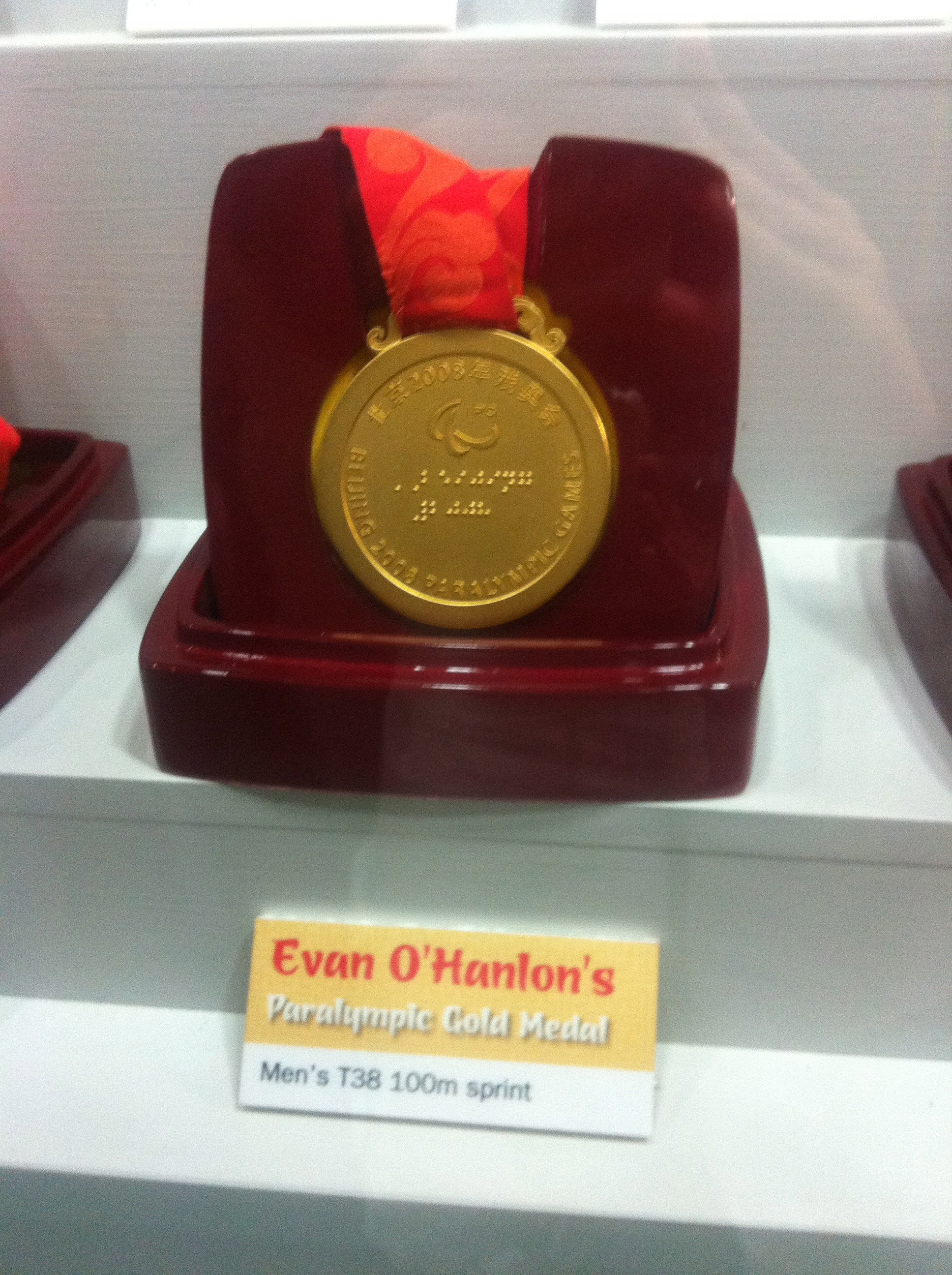
The gold medal O'Hanlon won in the 100 m T38 event at the 2008 Summer Paralympics, on display at the Australian Institute of Sport

O'Hanlon mainly competes in category T38 sprint events. Before the start of his last year of high school, he competed only against able bodied athletes.

In 2005, New South Wales Paralympic Talent Search Co-ordinator Amy Winters, herself a former Paralympian, recruited him to participate in Paralympic sport. That year, he represented Australia for the first time. In December, he moved to Canberra and started training full-time with Irina Dvoskina at the Australian Institute of Sport (AIS) from 2005 to 2016. Aged 19, his records made him the fastest male cerebral palsy competitor in the world. During his career, he has had to deal with painful shin splits.

O'Hanlon competed in the 2008 Summer Paralympics in Beijing, China. There he won three gold medals in the men's 100 metres – T38, men's 200 m – T38 and men's 4 x 100 metre relay – T35–38 events, for which he received a Medal of the Order of Australia. He won all of these events in World Record times, in the T38 100 m event with a time of 10.96 and in T38 200 m event with a time of 21.98. His time of 10.96 was the first time a male cerebral palsy athlete had a sub 11 second record time.

Personal best times outside the Paralympics include a time of 51.08 in the T38 400 m event, a record O'Hanlon set in Brisbane, and a distance of 6.11 metres (20.0 ft) in the T38 long jump event that he set in Canberra.

In 2005, O'Hanlon competed at the German Nationals and European Championships in the 100 m and 200 m events at his first overseas competition. At the IPC Athletics World Championships in 2006, he competed in the T38 100 m, but did not finish; finished third in the T38 200 m event; and won two gold medals in the 4x100 m relay and 4x400 m relay events. At the Australian Championships, he finished first in the T38 100 m and T38 200 m events in 2006, 2007 and 2008. His 2006 title was his first national one, when he won the T38 100 m event.

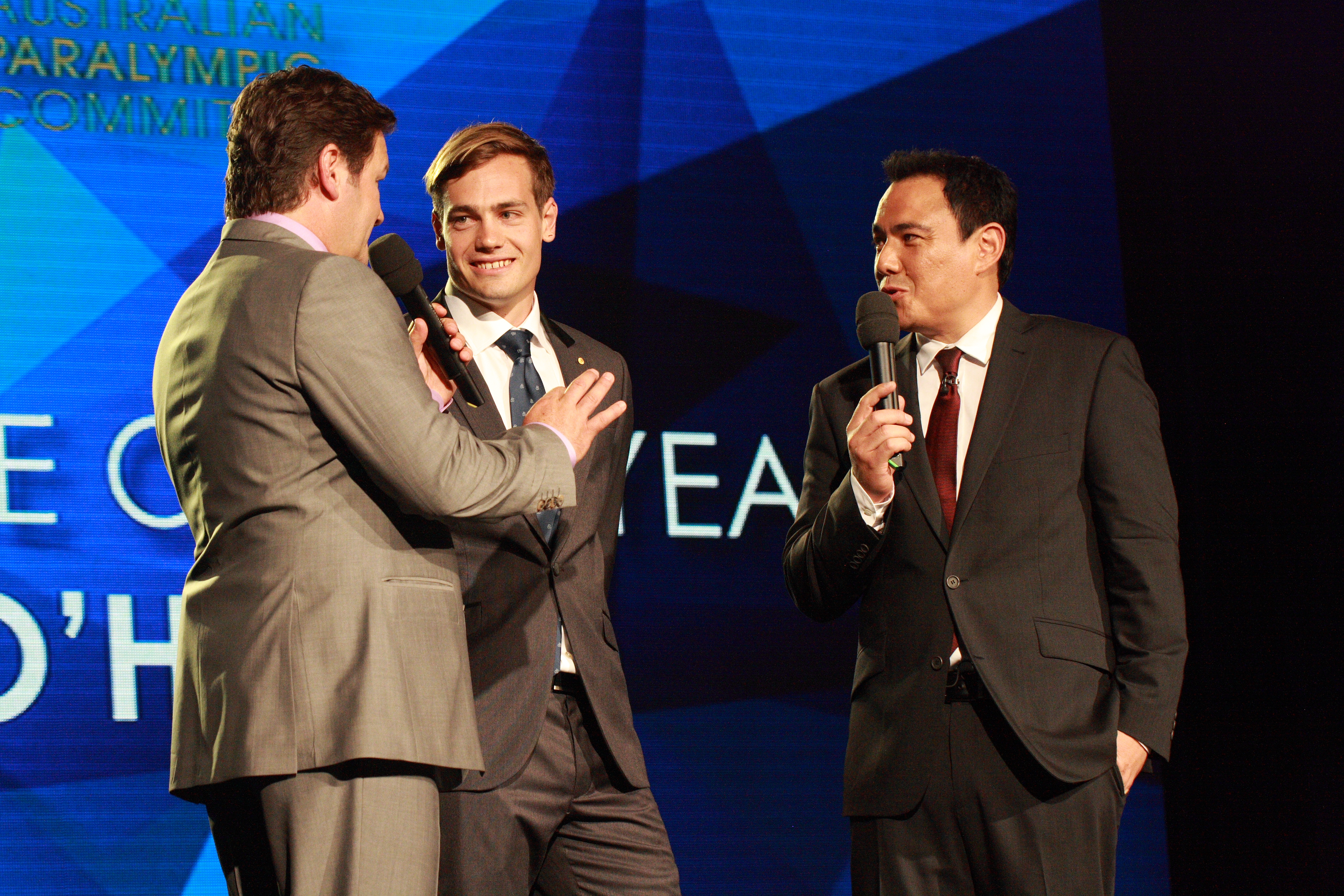
O'Hanlon interviewed after receiving the 2012 Male Athlete of the Year award at the Australian Paralympian of the Year ceremony

At the 2011 IPC Athletics World Championships, O'Hanlon won gold medals in the 100 m and 200 events, a silver medal in the 400 m event, and a bronze in the 4x100 m relay event. He finished fourth in the men's long jump event. His two gold medals at the event counted for half the total men's Australian gold medal count.

In 2009 and 2010, O'Hanlon took time off from Paralympic athletics to compete in Australia's able-bodied domestic athletics season. He has a personal goal of being able to beat able-bodied athletes. One of his early goals was to beat the times of fellow Paralympian athlete Tim Sullivan. He accomplished this, and was on a sprint team with Sullivan that won a Paralympic gold medal in the 4x100 m event in Beijing.

As of 2011, O'Hanlon is ranked first in the world. In 2011, he was an Australian Institute of Sport scholarship holder training and based in Canberra.

At the 2012 London Games, O'Hanlon repeated his Beijing success in winning the Men's 100 m and 200 m T38 events. He was the Australian flag bearer at the closing ceremony of the London games.

Competing at the 2013 IPC Athletics World Championships in Lyon, France, O'Hanlon won gold medals in the Men's 100 m, 200 m and 400 m T38 events.

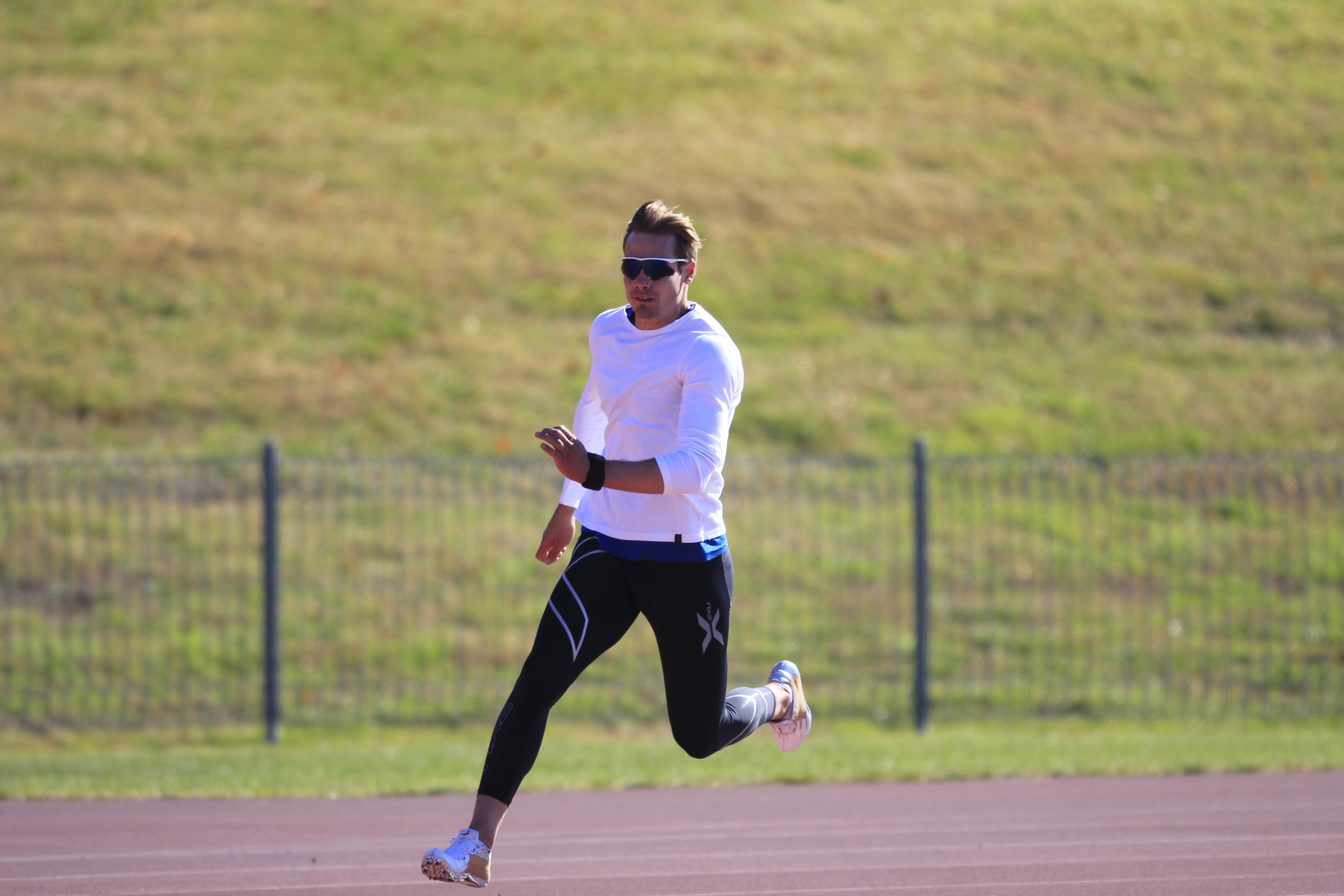
O'Hanlon training at the AIS in 2012

O'Hanlon competed at the Championships just weeks after being hospitalised with viral meningitis. O'Hanlon was forced to withdraw from the 2015 IPC Athletics World Championships in Doha due to a stress fracture in his back.

At the 2016 Rio Paralympics, O'Hanlon won the silver medal in the Men's 100 m T38 in a time of 10.98. He announced his retirement immediately after the event for personal reasons.

O'Hanlon moved to Sydney in 2016 and returned to athletics after taking up a part-time position in his family's architecture business. At the 2017 World Para Athletics Championships in London, he won the Men's 100m T38 in a time of 11.07s (−1.6). In winning gold, O'Hanlon joined Neil Fuller in becoming Australia's leading medallist at the World Para-Athletics Championships with 11 medals.

In winning the bronze medal in the Men's 100m T38 at the 2019 World Para Athletics Championships in Dubai, O'Hanlon became Australia's most successful male athlete with a disability. His bronze medal took him to 12 medals in five world championships – one more than four-time Paralympian Neil Fuller.

At the 2020 Tokyo Paralympics, O'Hanlon qualified for the final by coming second in his heat of the 100m T38. He went on to win the bronze medal.

O'Hanlon repeated his 2018 Commonwealth Games success by winning the 100 m T37/38 at the 2022 Commonwealth Games in a Games Record. Competing at his sixth World Championships, he finished in eighth place in the 100m T38 at the 2023 World Para Athletics Championships in Paris with a time of 11.41 (-0.2) just weeks after sustaining a hamstring tear in training.

He announced his retirement on 6 November 2023.

== Other sports ==
O'Hanlon has participated in rugby union. His involvement as a player ended because of repeated injuries. He has also competed in rowing as a school athlete. In November 2018 O'Hanlon commenced training as a bobsled pilot at Lillehammer, Norway. Following racing in Europe in 2019 and 2020 O'Hanlon suffered a serious foot injury during bobsled training in Germany. In February 2021 Evan became a dual-sport national representative for Australia as the pilot of the 2 man bobsled at the 2021 Bobsleigh and Skeleton World Championships held in Altenberg, Germany.

== Recognition ==
O'Hanlon was AIS Junior Athlete of the Year in 2008, and was also named Athletics Australia's 2008 Athlete of the Year – Male AWD. Cleo magazine named him as a finalist in its 2008 Bachelor of the Year contest. In 2011, he was nominated for The Age's Sport Performer Award in the Performer with a Disability category. In 2011, he received a Sport Achievement Award from the Australian Institute of Sport. O'Hanlon was a finalist for the 2012 Australian Paralympian of the Year. In November 2013, he was named Athletics Australia Male Para-Athlete of the Year. In 2014, he was inducted into the Sydney Olympic Park Athletic Centre Path of Champions. Inaugural inductee to University of Canberra Sport Walk of Fame in 2022.
