= Athletics at the 2022 Commonwealth Games – Men's 100 metres (T38) =

Men's 100 metres (T38) at the 2022 Commonwealth Games
- Venue: Alexander Stadium
- Dates: 3 August
- Competitors: 7 from 6 nations
- Winning time: 11.23

Medalists
gold medal	Evan O'Hanlon	Australia
silver medal	Charl du Toit	South Africa
bronze medal	Zachary Gingras	Canada

The men's 100 metres (T38) at the 2022 Commonwealth Games, as part of the athletics programme, took place in the Alexander Stadium on 3 August 2022.

== Records ==
Prior to this competition, the existing world and Games records were as follows:

Records T37
World record	Nick Mayhugh (USA)	10.95	Tokyo, Japan	27 August 2021
Records T38
World record	Hu Jianwen (CHN)	10.74	Rio de Janeiro, Brazil	13 September 2016

== Schedule ==
The schedule was as follows:

Date	Time	Round
Wednesday 3 August 2022	21:20	Final

All times are British Summer Time (UTC+1)

== Results ==
=== Final ===
The medals were determined in the final.

Rank	Lane	Athlete	Nation	Sport class	Time	Notes
1st place, gold medalist(s)	8	Evan O'Hanlon	Australia	T38	11.23	GR, SB
2nd place, silver medalist(s)	7	Charl du Toit	South Africa	T37	11.54	GR, SB
3rd place, bronze medalist(s)	3	Zachary Gingras	Canada	T38	11.65	
4	4	Shaun Burrows	England	T38	11.69	
5	2	Ross Paterson	Scotland	T38	11.95	PB
6	5	Rhys Jones	Wales	T37	12.09	PB
7	6	Alexander Thomson	Scotland	T38	12.23	
					Wind: -0.3 m/s	
