= Jonathan Ntutu =

South African Paralympic sprinter

Personal information
- Full name: Ndodomzi Jonathan Ntutu
- Nationality: South African
- Born: 4 February 1986 (age 40)
- Height: 171 cm (5 ft 7 in)

Sport
- Country: South Africa
- Sport: Athletics
- Disability class: T12
- Event: 100m
- Club: Tygerberg Northlink Club
- Coached by: Paul Gorries

Achievements and titles
- Paralympic finals: 4
- Highest world ranking: 1
- Personal best: 10.80
Medal record
Men's Paralympic athletics
Representing South Africa
Paralympic Games
Silver medal – second place	2016 Rio de Janeiro	100 m T12
Bronze medal – third place	2012 London	100 m T13
IPC World Championships
Silver medal – second place	2011 Christchurch	100 m T13
Silver medal – second place	2013 Lyon	100 m T13
Silver medal – second place	2015 Doha	200 m T12
Bronze medal – third place	2006 Assen	100 m T13
Bronze medal – third place	2013 Lyon	200 m T13
Commonwealth Games
Gold medal – first place	2018 Gold Coast	100 metres T12
Gold medal – first place	2022 Birmingham	100 metres T12
African Games
Gold medal – first place	2015 Brazzaville	200 m T12

Ndodomzi Jonathan Ntutu (born 4 February 1986) is a visually impaired South African sprinter. Ndodomzi Jonathan Ntutu is currently South Africa's fastest ever para-athlete. His 10.80 was posted on April 12, 2018, during the heats of the Commonwealth Games. Competing in the T12 classification, Ntutu has competed at three Summer Paralympic Games, winning bronze in the 2012 Games in London. He is also a multiple World Championships winner, taking five medals over four tournaments.

== Personal history ==
Ntutu was born in the township of Gugulethu in Cape Town, South Africa in 1986 to Alexander Ntutu and his wife Sylvia. He was born with a congenital complication that left him visually impaired; though he is not blind. He was unable to cope in mainstream education and his parents, who struggled financially, ensured that his needs were catered for by enrolling him in the Athlone School for the Blind. His father died in 1996, when Ntutu was entering his early teen years. He now lives in Bellville, Western Cape.

He was inspired to get involved in sports by cricketer Jacques Kallis, and played blind cricket for a time.

== Athletics career ==
Ntutu first showed promise as an athlete whilst at the Athlone school, showing at aptitude for sprinting. He was inspired to compete at the Paralympic Games after a pupil at his school qualified for the South Africa team at the 2000 Games in Sydney. He took on board a local trainer, David Williams, and began training at the Vygieskraal Stadium in Athlone. His efforts were rewarded, when in 2004, he was selected for the South African team at the 2004 Summer Paralympics in Athens. Initially classified as a T13 category athlete, for competitors with limited vision, he entered two events in Athens; the 100 metres sprint (T13) and the long jump (F13). He finished sixth overall in the long jump and his time of 11.34 in the heats of the 100m saw him finish two hundredths of a second outside the qualification time for the finals. Two years later he won his first major international medal, taking bronze in 100 metre sprint at the 2006 IPC Athletics World Championships in Assen.

In 2008 Ntutu competed at his second Paralympics, travelling to China to compete in the Beijing Games. He no longer competed in the long jump, but still entered two events, the 100 metre and 200 metre sprints. In the 100 metres he surpassed his achievement at the 2004 Games by qualifying through to the finals, where he finished fifth with a time of 11.06 seconds. Although finishing in the top three qualifiers in the heats of the 200 metres, he finished a distant eighth in the finals.

In the buildup to the 2012 Summer Paralympics in London, Ntutu entered his second World Championships, this time held in Christchurch, New Zealand. He entered all three sprint events, winning silver behind Russia's Alexey Labzin in the 100 metres and narrowly missing the podium with fourth place in the 400 metres. His biggest breakthrough of his career came at the London 2012 Paralympics, where he qualified for both the 100 metre and 200 metre sprints, making the finals of both. He finished sixth in the 200 metre race, but in the 100 metres he took the bronze medal, beating Labzin in a photo finish for the third spot.

At the 2013 IPC Athletics World Championships in Lyon, Ntutu came away a double medalist, winning a silver in the 100 metres (behind Ireland's Jason Smyth) and a first major medal in the 200 metres, a third placed bronze. Two years later Ntutu sight was deemed to have deteriorated and he was reclassified as a T12 classification athlete. This allowed him to enter his first African Games, as traditionally the T13 sprint was not contested. Held in Brazzaville in the Republic of Congo, Ntutu entered the 2015 African Games competing in the T12 200 metre sprint. He took gold, finishing ahead of countryman and fellow ex-Athlone School pupil Hilton Langenhoven.

At the 2015 IPC Athletics World Championships in Doha Ntutu took silver in the 200 metres but he was disqualified from the 100 metre sprint. The next year he added a second Paralympic medal when he took a silver in the 100 metres at the 2016 Games in Rio. He also competed in the 200 metre race but failed to qualify for the finals.

He also competed in the T12 100m sprint at the 2020 Summer Paralympics.
