= Freddy Sandoval =

Mexican baseball player (born 1982)

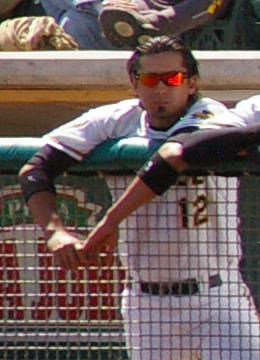
- Sandoval with the Salt Lake Bees on April 12, 2009.
- Third baseman
- Born: August 16, 1982 (age 43); Tijuana, Mexico
- Batted: Switch Threw: Right

MLB debut
- September 8, 2008, for the Los Angeles Angels of Anaheim

Last MLB appearance
- October 4, 2009, for the Los Angeles Angels of Anaheim

MLB statistics
- Batting average: .176
- Home runs: 0
- Runs batted in: 0
- Stats at Baseball Reference

Teams
- Los Angeles Angels of Anaheim (2008–2009)

Freddy Carol Sandoval Herrera (born August 16, 1982) is a Mexican former professional baseball third baseman. He played in Major League Baseball (MLB) for the Los Angeles Angels of Anaheim from 2008 to 2009.

== Playing career ==
=== Amateur ===
Sandoval played his collegiate baseball for the San Diego Toreros from 2002 to 2004, and was part of two conference championship teams during his career there.

=== Los Angeles Angels ===
Sandoval was drafted by the Los Angeles Angels of Anaheim in the eighth round (233rd overall) of the 2004 Major League Baseball draft. He made his professional debut in 2005 with the Single-A Cedar Rapids Kernels, hitting .281 with four home runs, 63 RBI, and 17 stolen bases across 117 games.

Sandoval played in 113 games for the High-A Rancho Cucamonga Quakes during the 2006 season, batting .258/.343/.366 with five home runs, 54 RBI, and 30 stolen bases. In 2007, he made 127 appearances for the Double-A Arkansas Travelers, hitting .305/.392/.468 with 11 home runs, 72 RBI, and 21 stolen bases.

Sandoval made his major league debut against the New York Yankees on September 8, 2008, at Angel Stadium in Anaheim, California. Sandoval made six appearances for Los Angeles during his rookie campaign, going 1-for-6 (.167) with one walk.

Sandoval played in the 2009 World Baseball Classic as Mexico's leadoff hitter. He made five appearances for the Angels in 2009, going 2-for-11 (.182) with one double.

Sandoval spent the 2010 season with the Triple-A Salt Lake Bees, slashing .210/.326/.247 with 10 RBI across 22 games. He played in 44 games for Salt Lake in 2011, hitting .280/.337/.414 with four home runs, 20 RBI, and five stolen bases. On September 1, 2011, Sandoval was removed from the 40-man roster and sent outright to Salt Lake; he elected free agency following the season on November 2.

=== Somerset Patriots ===
On April 11, 2012, Sandoval signed with the Somerset Patriots of the Atlantic League of Professional Baseball. Sandoval made 53 appearances for the Patriots, batting .250/.321/.359 with two home runs, 25 RBI, and three stolen bases.

=== Kansas City Royals ===
On February 28, 2013, Sandoval signed a minor league contract with the Kansas City Royals. He spent his time in the organization on the disabled list, and was released by the Royals on August 22.

== Post-playing career ==
Sandoval was named as the mental skills coach by Kansas City Royals after retiring. In 2017, he served as a coach/team psychologist for the Toros de Tijuana of the Mexican League.
