= Josiah Jamison =

American Paralympic sprinter

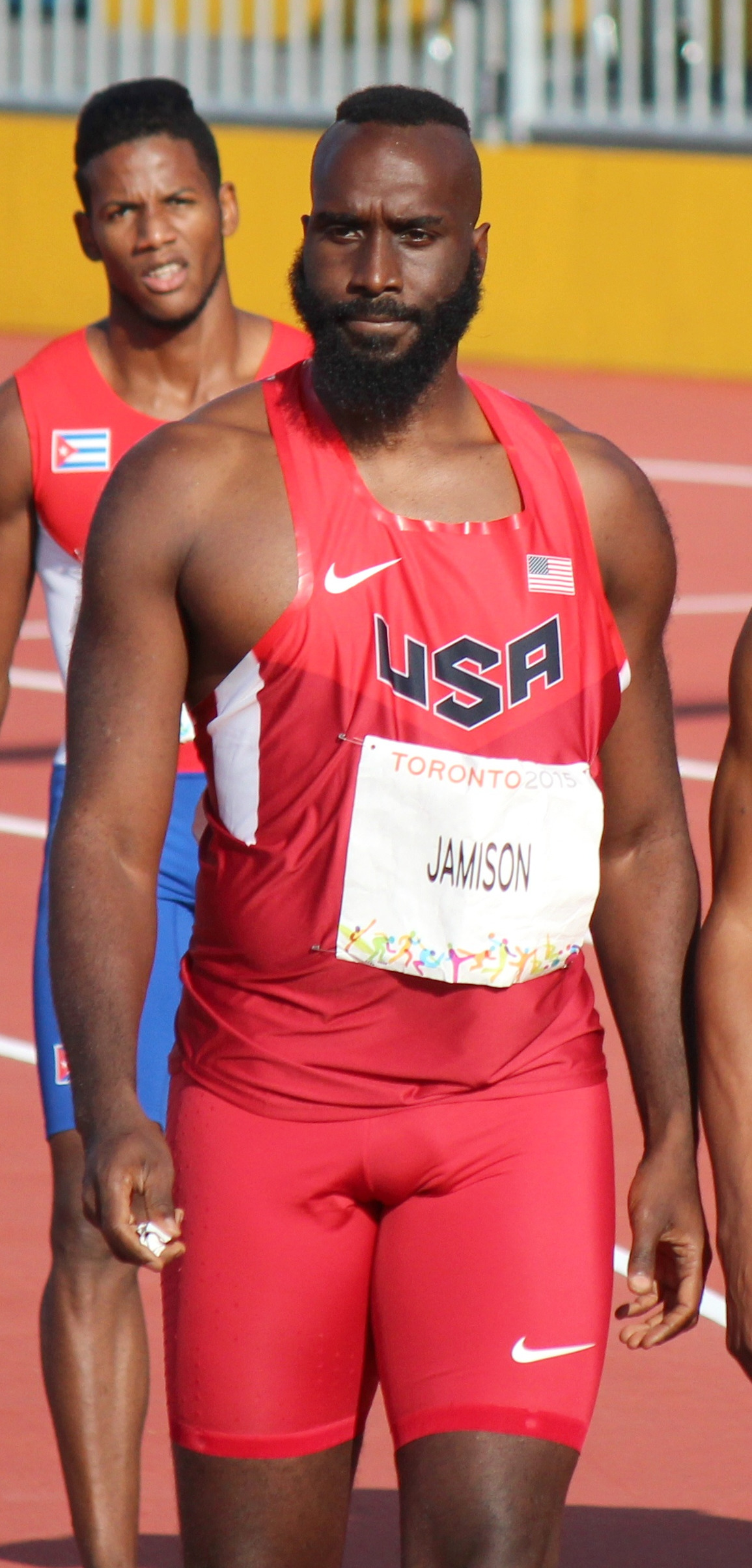
- Jamison at the 2015 Parapan American Games

Personal information
- Born: August 18, 1982 (age 43) Vance, South Carolina, U.S.
- Height: 196 cm (6 ft 5 in)
- Weight: 86 kg (190 lb)

Sport
- Sport: Paralympic athletics
- Disability class: T12
- Event: Sprint
Medal record
Representing United States
Paralympic Games
Gold medal – first place	2008 Beijing	100 m T12
IPC World Championships
Gold medal – first place	2006	100 m T12
Bronze medal – third place	2011 Christchurch	100 m T12
Silver medal – second place	2013	4 × 100 m T11–13
Parapan American Games
Silver medal – second place	2007 Rio	400 m T12
Bronze medal – third place	2007 Rio	100 m T12
Bronze medal – third place	2007 Rio	200 m T12
Silver medal – second place	2015 Toronto	100 m T12

Josiah Jamison (born August 18, 1982) is a visually impaired American sprint runner. He has retinitis pigmentosa, a hereditary eye disease that affects peripheral and night vision. He began racing at the South Carolina School for the Deaf and Blind in Spartanburg and won a gold medal for the United States at the 2008 Summer Paralympics in the 100 m T12 event. He also competed at the 2012 Summer Paralympics, but was disqualified in both the 100 m and 200 m heats for violating a newly implemented rule that a guide may not separate from the runner farther than 50 cm; his 4 × 100 m relay team also failed to finish at those Paralympics. At the world championships Jamison won a gold, a silver and a bronze medal between 2006 and 2013.
