= Andreas Ottosson =

Swedish footballer

Personal information
- Full name: Kenneth Andreas Ottosson
- Date of birth: 28 August 1971 (age 55)
- Position: Forward

Senior career*
Years	Team	Apps	(Gls)
1993–1994	IFK Karlshamn		
1995–1998	Östers IF		
1999	Tromsø IL	22	(7)
2000–2001	IK Start	49	(24)
2002–2004	Östers IF		
2005	IFK Värnamo		
2006	IFK Hässleholm		
- * Club domestic league appearances and goals

Andreas Ottosson (born 28 August 1971) is a Swedish retired football striker.
