= Emicarlo Souza =

Brazilian Paralympic athlete

Personal information
- Full name: Emicarlo Elias de Souza
- Born: 26 October 1981 (age 44) Natal, Brazil
- Height: 1.67 m (5 ft 6 in)

Sport
- Sport: Para athletics
- Disability class: T46
- Event: Sprint
Medal record
Men's para athletics
Representing Brazil
Parapan American Games
Silver medal – second place	2007 Rio de Janeiro	400m T46

Emicarlo Elias de Souza (born 26 October 1981) is a Brazilian athlete who runs in the T46 class. He has a degree in Administration Studies from Universidade Potiguar, and is married to Joana Claudione with one son. Souza is a single-arm amputee.

At the 2012 Summer Paralympic Games, Souza ran with the Brazilian team in the 4 × 100 m – T42–46 relay. The team finished in second place, but was disqualified for a technical error.
