= Jack Swift =

Australian athlete (born 1985)

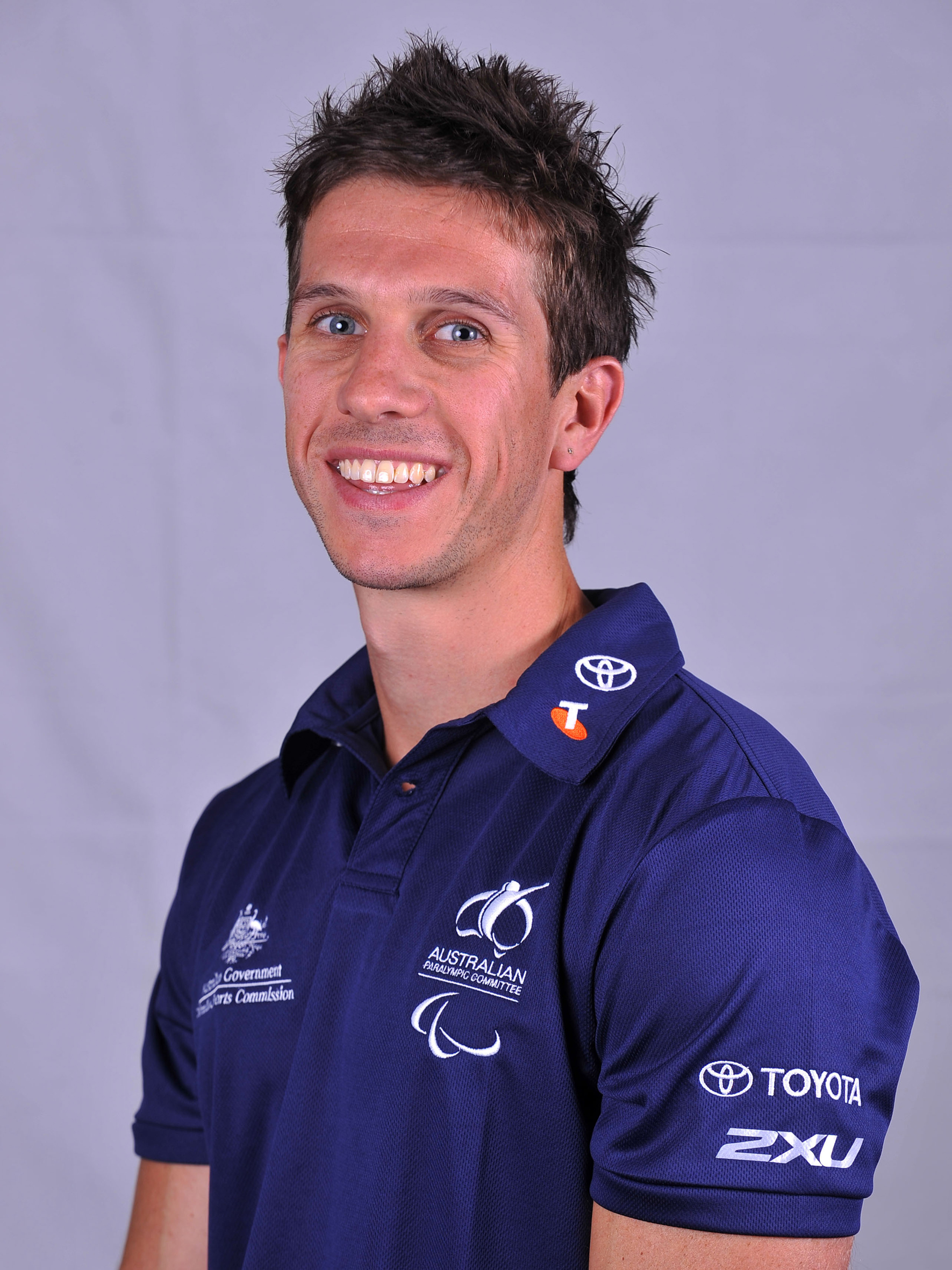
- 2012 Australian Paralympic team portrait of Swift

Personal information
- Nationality: Australian
- Born: 8 August 1985 (age 40)

Sport
- Country: Australia
- Sport: Paralympic athletics Paratriathlon
Medal record
Men's paratriathlon
Representing Australia
Oceania Championships
Gold medal – first place	2015 Penrith	PT4
Silver medal – second place	2014 Penrith	PT4
Silver medal – second place	2016 Devonport	PT4

Jack Swift (born 8 August 1985) is an Australian athletics competitor and paratriathlete. He was selected to represent Australia at the 2012 Summer Paralympics in athletics in the 400m and 4 × 100 m events.

== Personal ==
Swift was born on 8 August 1985, and is from the Melbourne suburb of Ivanhoe in Victoria. He attended Marcellin College, and played Australian rules football while at school.

In 2006, Swift lost the lower part of his right leg when he was twenty-one years old after an accident while at work, "when a 14-tonne excavator fell and crushed his right leg". Prior to his accident, he was a plumber's labourer. He was a finalist for the 2011 Victorian Cleo Bachelor of the Year. In February 2011, he was on the cover of Australian Men's Health. He pursued a degree in exercise-science from Deakin University. As of 2012, he works as a personal trainer.

In 2025, he was appointed the Victorian Institute of Sport Para Unit Lead.

== Athletics ==
Swift competes in the T44 athletics classification. He became involved with athletics as a form of personal mental health improvement following his accident, and had not competed in athletics prior to his accident.

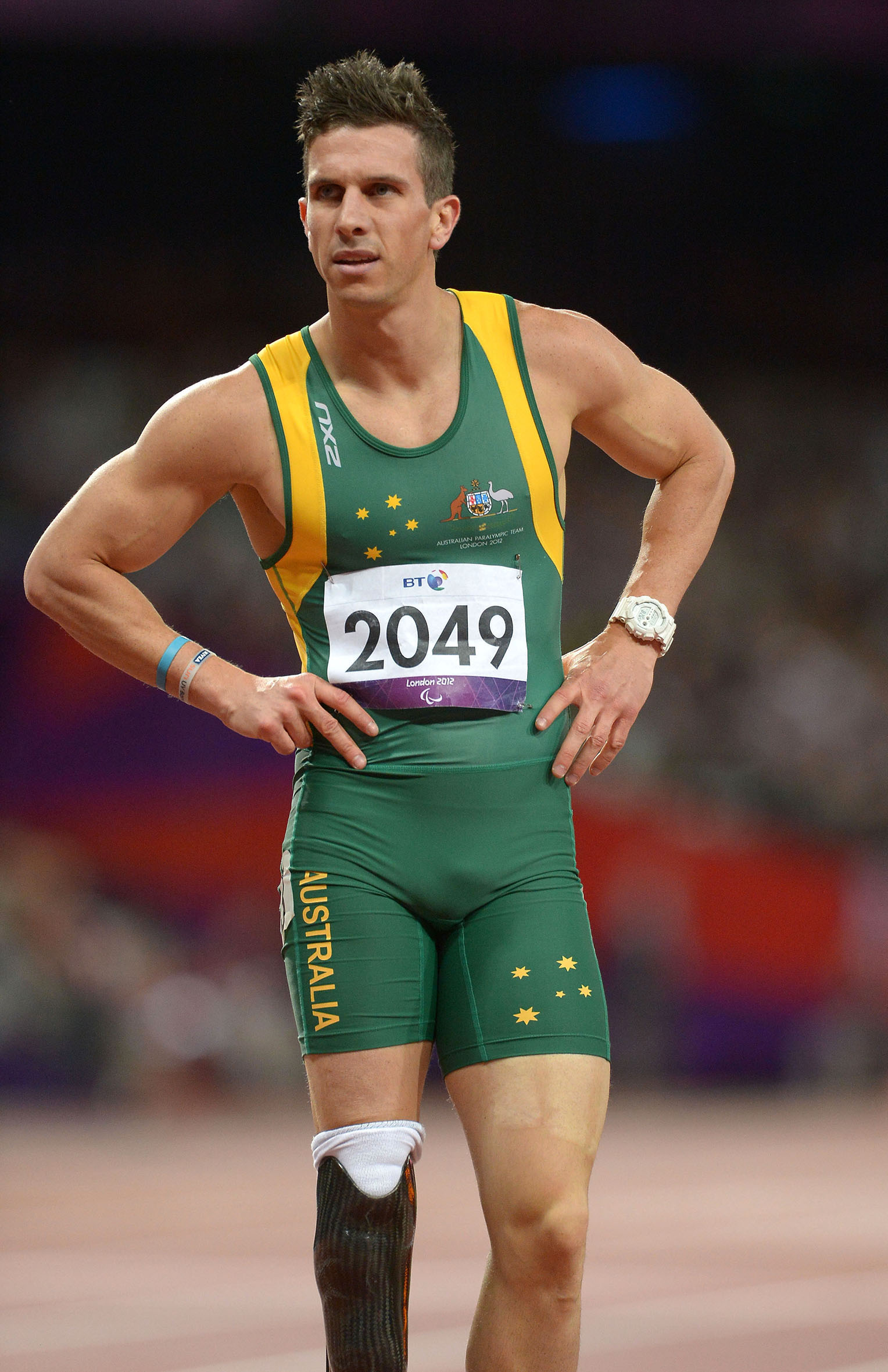
Swift competing in athletics at the 2012 London Paralympics

In 2011, Swift was training as much as twenty-five hours a week. In the 2011 Victorian Athletic League, he participated in the Athletes With a Disability 120m event, the only event open to athletes with disability during the season. In 2011, he was an Australian national ambulant 100m and 200m finalist. At the 2011 Australian Athletics Championships, he finished third in the 200m wheelchair race final. He assisted in unveiling the 2012 Australian Paralympic athletics uniform. He did this at the Mercedes-Benz Fashion Week Australia Spring/Summer 2012/13 on day two at Sydney's Overseas Passenger Terminal on 1 May 2012. He was selected to represent Australia at the 2012 Summer Paralympics in athletics in the 400m and 4 × 100 m events. He did not medal at the 2012 Games.

== Paratriathlon ==
In April 2013, Swift raced his first sprint distance triathlon. Based on his performance in this race, he was selected in Australia's 2013 ITU Triathlon World Championships paratriathlon team. Like several other selected Australian athletes, he did not race. Swift competed in the 2014 Australian and Oceania Paratriathlon Championships, placing 2nd in the TRI-5 (moderate leg impairment) classification. He also placed second TRI-5 in the ITU World Paratriathlon event in Elwood. At the 2014 ITU World Triathlon Series Final in Edmonton, Canada, he finished eleventh in the Men's PT4. In January 2015, Swift won the Oceania Paratriathlon Championships PT4 event at Penrith, New South Wales. At the 2015 World Triathlon Series Final in Chicago, Swift finished twelfth in the Men's PT4.

Swift now aims to qualify for paratriathlon at the 2016 Summer Paralympics.
