= Roman Kapranov =

Russian Paralympic athlete (born 1983)

Personal information
- Nationality: Russian
- Born: 7 November 1983 (age 42) Dzerzhinsk, Russia

Sport
- Country: Russia
- Sport: Paralympic athletics
- Disability class: T37
- Event: Sprint
Medal record
Paralympic athletics
Representing Russia
Paralympic Games
| Gold medal – first place | 2012 London | 200m - T37 |
| Bronze medal – third place | 2012 London | 100m - T37 |
IPC World Championships
| Gold medal – first place | 2011 Christchurch | 200m - T37 |
| Gold medal – first place | 2013 Lyon | 4x100m - T35-38 |
| Silver medal – second place | 2013 Lyon | 100m - T37 |
IPC European Championships
| Gold medal – first place | 2012 Stadskanaal | 100m - T37 |
| Gold medal – first place | 2012 Stadskanaal | 400m - T37 |
| Silver medal – second place | 2012 Stadskanaal | 200m - T37 |

Roman Kapranov (born 7 November 1983) is a Paralympian athlete from Russia competing mainly in category T37 sprint events. Kapranov competed for his country at the 2012 Summer Paralympics in London, where he won two medals, including a gold in the 100 metre sprint. He has also competed at two World Championships winning three medals.
