= Jean-Baptiste Alaize =

French athletics competitor

Personal information
- National team: France
- Born: Mugisha; May 10, 1991 (age 35)

Sport
- Sport: Long jump
- Disability class: T44

Achievements and titles
- Paralympic finals: 2012 Summer Paralympics; 2016 Summer Paralympics

Jean-Baptiste Alaize (born 10 May 1991) is a French athlete with an amputated tibia, who specialises in sprint and long jump. He represented France at the Paralympic Games in 2012 and 2016.

== Biography ==
Jean-Baptiste Alaize, originally named Mugisha, was born on 10 May 1991 in Muyinga Province, Burundi. He was one of six siblings and his father was in the military. On 23 October 1994, during the Burundian Civil War, his village was attacked by Hutu neighbors. His mother was decapitated in front of him and he was left for dead. He had his leg amputated and was abandoned by his father. In 1998, he was adopted by Robert and Daniele Alaize, a couple from Montélimar, France. There he was renamed to Jean-Baptiste Alaize.

In Montélimar, Jean-Baptiste and his adoptive brother Julien were the only black people, and they often faced bullying and racism. During a sports day at his school, he discovered that he had a talent for running when he was chosen to be last in a relay race and he caught up with the other competitors. When his class learned that Alaize had a prosthetic leg, he gained respect from his classmates. His physical education teacher advised him to join a local athletics club, and he began to regularly win against non-disabled runners. Alaize considered Oscar Pistorius to be his hero, and he wanted a running blade like him. His parents organized fundraising to pay for it.

Alaize began to specialize in sprinting and long-jumping. He made his Paralympic debut at the 2012 Summer Paralympics in London and placed fifth in the T44 men's long jump event at the 2016 Summer Paralympics in Rio de Janeiro. In 2016, Alaize became a "Champion of Peace", one of 100 athletes promoting social unity, under the patronage of Albert II, Prince of Monaco. He is featured in the 2020 documentary film Rising Phoenix.
