= Allel Boukhalfa =

Algerian Paralympic athlete

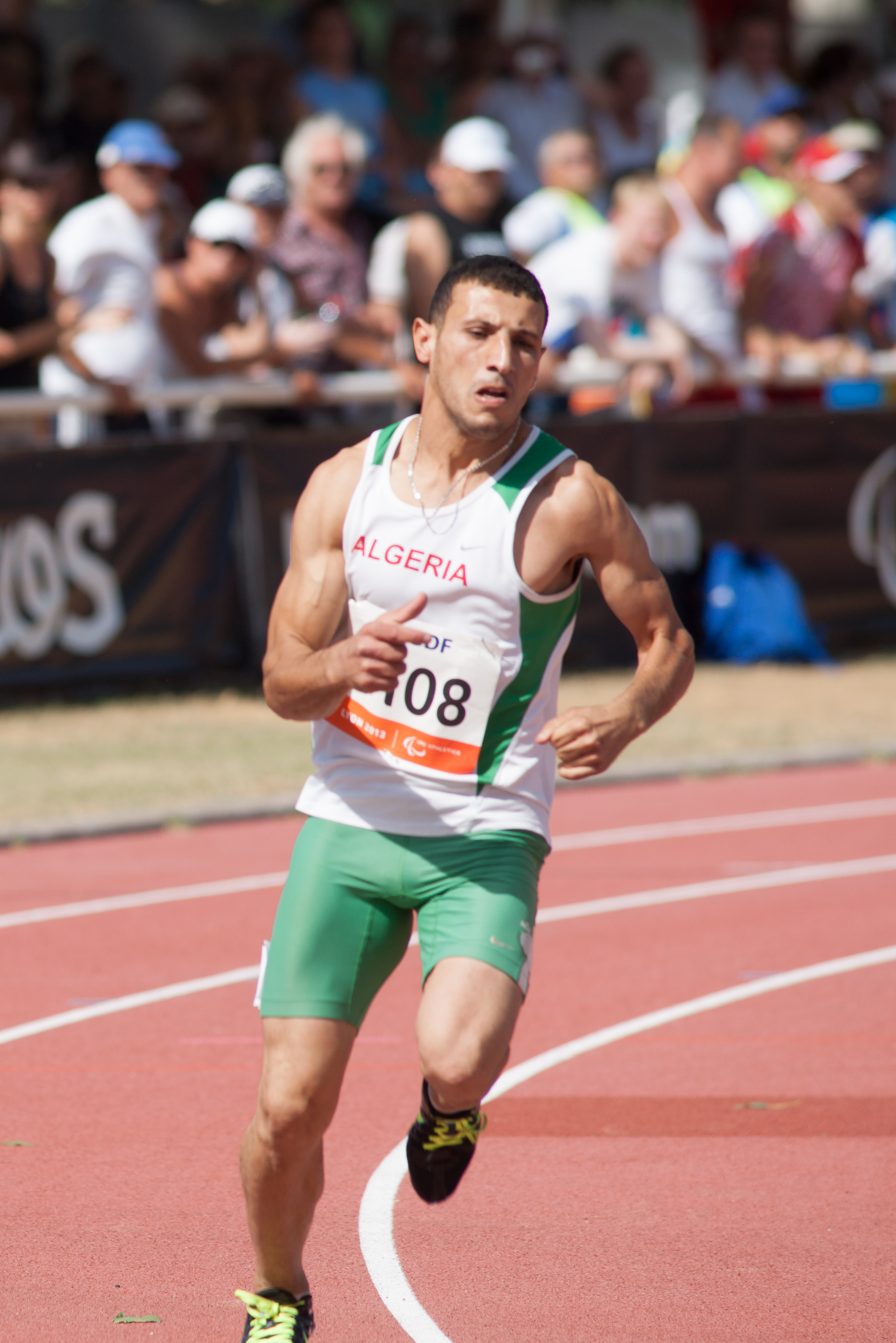
- Allel Boukhalfa at the 2013 IPC Athletics World Championships

Personal information
- Nationality: Algerian
- Born: 17 February 1988 (age 38)

Sport
- Country: Algeria
- Sport: Paralympic athletics
- Disability class: T35
- Event(s): Sprinter; Middle distance
- Club: Mostakbel Algiers
Medal record
Men's paralympic athletics
Representing Algeria
IPC World Championships
Silver medal – second place	2011 Christchurch	100 m T35
Silver medal – second place	2011 Christchurch	200 m T35

Allel Boukhalfa (17 February 1988) is a Paralympic athlete from Algeria. Boukhalfa represented his country twice at the Summer Paralympic Games, in 2008 in Beijing and 2012 in London.

He is the current world record holder in the T35 400m with a performance of 60.55 which he set in Christchurch, New Zealand on the 29 January 2011, set while winning gold at the 2011 IPC Athletics World Championships. He also finished second in the T35 200m at the same championships.
