= Marcin Mielczarek =

Polish Paralympic athlete

Medal record

Paralympic athletics

Representing Poland

Paralympic Games
Bronze medal – third place	2004 Athens	400 metres – T36

IPC World Championships
Bronze medal – third place	2013 Lyon	Long jump – T36

IPC European Championships
Silver medal – second place	2016 Grosseto	Long jump – T36
Bronze medal – third place	2012 Stadskanaal	Long jump – T36
Bronze medal – third place	2014 Swansea	Long jump – T36

Marcin Mielczarek (born 11 November 1982) is a paralympic athlete from Poland competing mainly in category T36 sprint and long jump events.

Mielczarek competed in all three sprint events in the 2004 Summer Paralympics winning the bronze medal in the T36 400m. He also competed in the 100m and 200m at the 2008 Summer Paralympics in Beijing but missed out on a medal in both events.
