= Kortney Clemons =

American Paralympic athlete (born 1980)

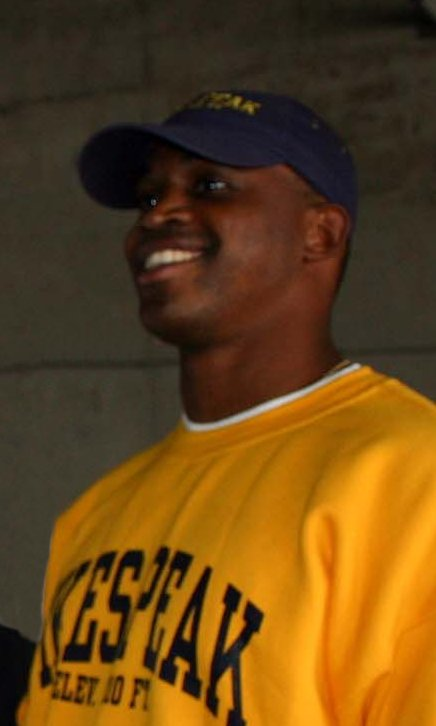

Personal information
- Nationality: United States
- Born: June 23, 1980 (age 46)
- Height: 5 ft 10 in (1.78 m)

Kortney Clemons (born June 23, 1980) is an American Paralympic athlete and Iraq War Veteran.

He is featured in the 2009 documentary Warrior Champions about American soldiers who lost limbs or suffered paralysis in Iraq, and their way to the 2008 Summer Paralympics in Beijing.

== Early life ==
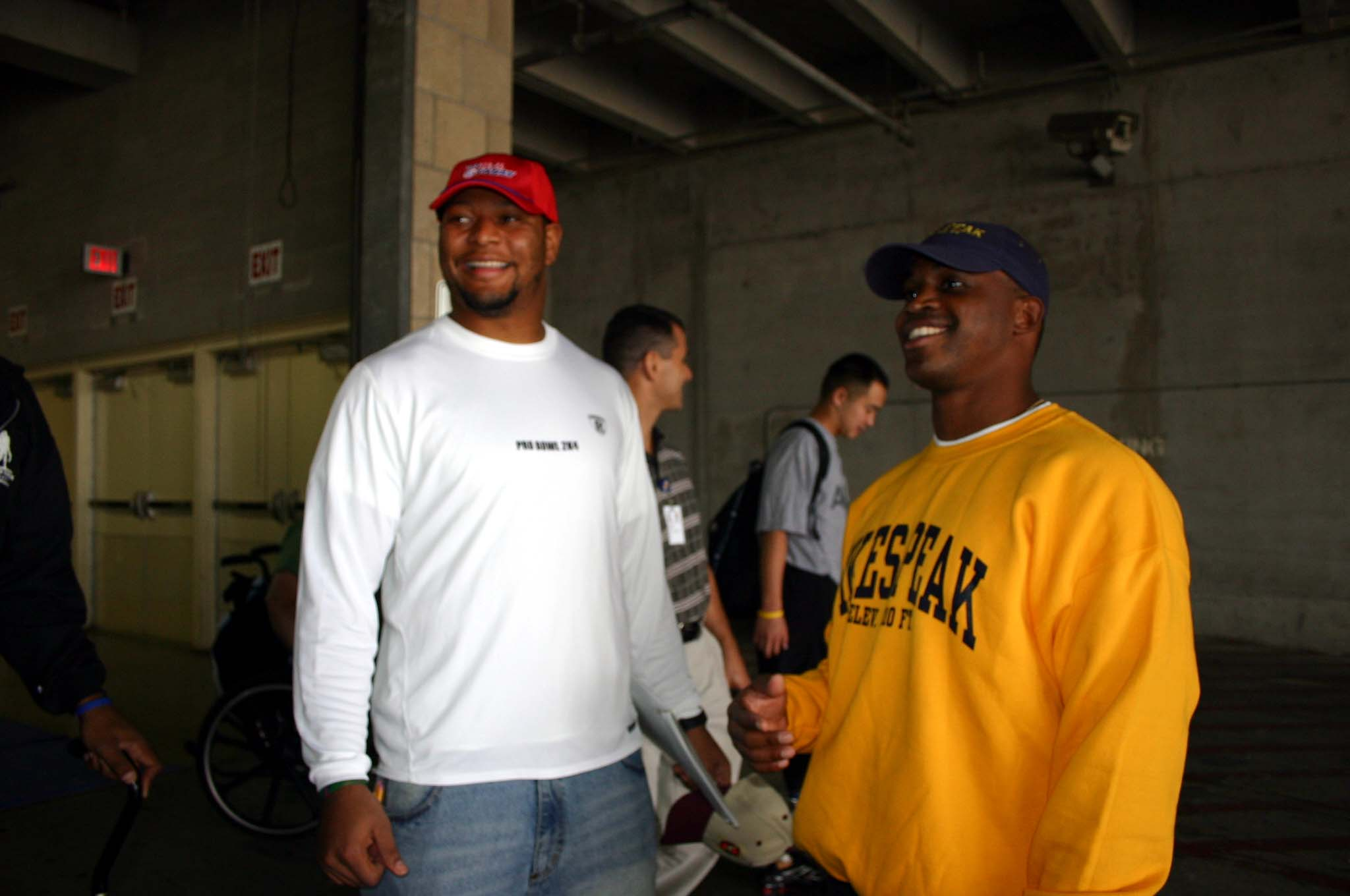
Paralympic athlete Sgt. Kortney Clemons and former New Orleans Saints running back Deuce McAllister reminisce about when they played against each other when Clemons was a high school freshman and McAllister was a senior.

Clemons went to high school in Little Rock, Mississippi. He played football, basketball and baseball.

He played junior college football as a cornerback at East Mississippi Community College before he joined the army.

== Military service ==
Clemons is a Purple Heart recipient. He served in the United States Army from 2001 to 2006.

He was working as a combat medic in the 1st Cavalry Division.

Clemons lost his leg in Baghdad, Iraq on February 21, 2005, when he and other soldiers were helping a group of soldiers whose car had hit gravel and tipped over. As they were helping, a roadside bomb exploded, and wounded some and killed others. In the first years since this happened, Clemons has worn a bracelet with the name of three soldiers who lost their lives; 1st Lt. Jason Timmerman, Staff Sgt. David Day and Sgt. Jesse Lhotka.

== Paralympic career ==
Clemons attended a clinic held by U.S. Paralympics at Brooke Army Medical Center in 2005, and then a Military Sports Camp, which was when he started track and field training. He first started competing in power lifting, but chose to commit to track and field in 2007.

He is the first Iraq war Veteran to have qualified for the U.S. Paralympic team.

He tried to qualify for the 2008 Summer Paralympics in Beijing, but did not make the cut. This is featured in the 2009 documentary Warrior Champions. He is now focusing on the 2012 Summer Paralympics in London.

Currently, he is on the roster to compete for the U.S. in the 2016 Summer Paralympics.

=== National championships ===
He won the 100m (T42) at the U.S. Paralympics Track & Field National Championships, Tempe, Ariz, in 2008.

== Education ==
He attended Penn State University and participated in their Ability Athlete program.

== Bibliography ==
- Clemons, Kortney; Briggs, Bill (2008). Amped: A Soldier's Race for Gold in the Shadow of War. John Wiley & Sons. p. 288. ISBN 978-0-470-28137-6.

== Filmography ==
- Warrior Champions: From Baghdad to Beijing, a documentary film by directors Brent Renaud and Craig Renaud.
