= Yang Sen (athlete) =

Chinese Paralympic sprinter

Personal information
- Born: 28 April 1990 (age 36)

Sport
- Sport: Paralympic athletics
- Disability class: T35
Medal record
Track and field
Representing China
Paralympic Games
Gold medal – first place	2008 Beijing	100m - T35
World Para Athletics Championships
Silver medal – second place	2011 Christchurch	4x100m relay T35-38
Asian Para Games
Silver medal – second place	2010 Guangzhou	100m T37
Silver medal – second place	2010 Guangzhou	200m T37

Yang Sen (simplified Chinese: 杨森; traditional Chinese: 楊森; pinyin: Yáng Sēn) is a Paralympian athlete from China competing mainly in category T35 sprint events.

He competed in the 2008 Summer Paralympics in Beijing, China. There he won a gold medal in the men's 100 metres - T35 event
