= Alejandro Maldonado (athlete) =

Argentine Paralympic athlete (born 1977)

Personal information
- Born: 7 March 1977 (age 49) Mar del Plata
- Height: 1.53 m (5 ft 0 in)

Sport
- Country: Argentina
- Sport: Paralympic athletics
- Disability: Arthrogryposis
- Disability class: T54
Medal record
Paralympic athletics
Representing Argentina
Parapan American Games
Gold medal – first place	2019 Lima	5000m T54
Silver medal – second place	2007 Rio de Janeiro	800m T54
Silver medal – second place	2019 Lima	1500m T54
Bronze medal – third place	2007 Rio de Janeiro	1500m T54
Bronze medal – third place	2007 Rio de Janeiro	5000m T54
Bronze medal – third place	2019 Lima	400m T54
Bronze medal – third place	2019 Lima	800m T54

Alejandro Alberto Maldonado (born 7 March 1977) is an Argentine Paralympic athlete who competes in both middle-distance and long-distance wheelchair racing at international elite events. He is a seven-time Parapan American Games medalist and has competed at the 2004 and 2008 Summer Paralympics.
