= Colin Mathieson =

Canadian Paralympic athlete

Medal record

Paralympic athletics

Representing Canada

Paralympic Games
Bronze medal – third place	1996 Atlanta	4x400 metre relay - T52-53

Colin Mathieson is a Paralympic athlete from Canada competing in the 100 meter, 200 meter & 400 meter.

Colin Mathieson is a 4 time Canadian Paralympian from Winnipeg Manitoba, Canada. Colin has competed on the Canadian national team since 1995. Colin has competed in four Paralympic Games, in 1996, 2000, 2008, and 2012, with a medal in 1996 in the 4 × 400 m relay. In addition to his Paralympic accomplishments he has also won 3 bronze medals from the IPC World Championships (2002, 2013) and a silver medal from the 2006 IPC European Championships in Helsinki. Colin also holds several Canadian Championship titles from 1994 to 2014.
