= Curtis Thom =

Canadian wheelchair racer (born 1986)

Curtis Edward Thom (born June 13, 1986) is a Canadian wheelchair racer. In 2016, he competed at the 2016 Summer Paralympics for Team Canada and won a bronze medal in the T54 4X400-m relay.

== Early life ==
Thom was born on June 13, 1986, in Burnaby, British Columbia, with spina bifida and hydrocephalus causing fluid build-up in the brain. As a result, he had four operations in the first 10 days of his life and although he had learned to walk by age two, a growth spurt meant he required further surgery for a tethered spinal cord. Thom and his family moved to Mississauga, Ontario when he was four years old and he began wheelchair racing at the age of 10 after being inspired by the 1500m during the 1996 Summer Paralympics. His father, Ken, coached him until his death in 2017 as a result of a scuba diving accident.

== Career ==
As a teenager, Thom was named Ontario Wheelchair Sports Association athlete of the year in 2001, 2002, and 2003. He also won the 2003 Athlete of the Year award for the city of Mississauga. He then qualified for the 2004 Summer Paralympics in Athens with a time of 1: 47.19 minutes in the men's 800m. Thom subsequently made his Paralympic debut where he helped Team Canada place fourth in the T53-S4 4X100. Following this, he was named to Canada's IPC World Championship Team in 2006, where he placed sixth in the 4X100m relay, and in 2011 where he placed seventh in the 200m.

Thom eventually left Mississauga to Ottawa to train with his coach Bob Schrader on a full-time basis. While training with the Ottawa Lions Track and Field Club, he qualified for the 2012 Summer Paralympics after winning three gold medals at the Canadian track and field trials in Calgary. During his second Paralympic Games, Thom competed in the 100-, 200-, and 4 x 400-metre races, placing sixth in the 4 x 400-metre. Following this, Thom raced to a gold medal in the men's T53–54 wheelchair 4 × 400 metres at the 2013 IPC Athletics World Championships. After spending most of 2015 recovering from surgery, Thom won the T54 100-, 200- and 400-metre sprints at the 2016 National Championship in Edmonton.

After qualifying for his third Paralympic Games, Thom won a bronze medal in the T54 4X400-m relay at the 2016 Summer Paralympics. He was subsequently named the para track male outstanding performer. Following his Paralympic success, Thom won four gold medals at the 2017 para Canadian Track and Field Championships. In 2021, Thom coached Jessica Cooper Lewis, a Bermudian T53 wheelchair racer, for the 2020 Summer Paralympics.
