= Stefan Rusch =

Dutch Paralympic athlete

Personal information
- Born: 31 May 1993 (age 33) Groningen, Netherlands

Sport
- Country: Netherlands
- Sport: Paralympic athletics
- Disability: Spastic diplegia
- Disability class: T34
Medal record
Paralympic athletics
Representing Netherlands
World Championships
Bronze medal – third place	2011 Christchurch	Men's 100m T34
Bronze medal – third place	2011 Christchurch	Men's 400m T34
Bronze medal – third place	2013 Lyon	Men's 100m T34
European Championships
Gold medal – first place	2012 Stadskanaal	Men's 100m T34
Gold medal – first place	2012 Stadskanaal	Men's 200m T34
Gold medal – first place	2018 Berlin	Men's 100m T34

Stefan Rusch (born 31 May 1993) is a Dutch Paralympic athlete who competes in international level events. He is a triple World bronze medalist and a triple European champion in 100 metres, 200 metres and 400 metres. He participated at the 2012 Summer Paralympics where he finished sixth in the final of the men's 100m T34 and 200m T34.
