= Athletics at the 2024 Summer Paralympics – Men's 1500 metres =

Athletics – Men's 1500 metres at the XVII Paralympic Games
- Venue: Stade de France
- Dates: 31 August – 7 September 2024
- No. of events: 6

1500 metres at the 2024 Summer Paralympics
Men's · T11 · T13 · T20 · T38 · T46 · T54 · Women's · T11 · T13 · T20 · T54

The Men's 1500m athletics events for the 2024 Summer Paralympics will take place at the Stade de France from 31 August to 7 September 2024. A total of 6 events will be contested over this distance.

== Schedule ==
| R | Round 1 | F | Final |

| Date | Sat 31 | | Sun 1 | | Mon 2 | | Tue 3 | | Wed 4 | | Thu 5 | | Fri 6 | | Sat 7 | |
| Event | M | E | M | E | M | E | M | E | M | E | M | E | M | E | M | E |
|---|---|---|---|---|---|---|---|---|---|---|---|---|---|---|---|---|
| T11 1500m | | | | | R | | F | | | | | | | | | |
| T13 1500m | | | | | R | | F | | | | | | | | | |
| T20 1500m | | | | | | | | | | | | | F | | | |
| T38 1500m | | | | | | | | | | | | | | R | | F |
| T46 1500m | F | | | | | | | | | | | | | | | |
| T54 1500m | | | | | | R | | F | | | | | | | | |

== Medal summary ==
The following is a summary of the medals awarded across all 1500 metres events.

| Classification | Gold | | Silver | | Bronze | |
|---|---|---|---|---|---|---|
| T11 | Yeltsin Jacques; Brazil | 3:55.82 WR | Yitayal Silesh Yigzaw; Ethiopia | 4:03.21 | Júlio Cesar Agripino; Brazil | 4:04.03 |
| T13 | Aleksandr Kostin; Neutral Paralympic Athletes | 3:44.43 PR | Rouay Jebabli; Tunisia | 3:44.67 AR | Anton Kuliatin; Neutral Paralympic Athletes | 3:44.94 PB |
| T20 | Ben Sandilands; Great Britain | 3:45.40 WR | Sandro Baessa; Portugal | 3:49.46 PB | Michael Brannigan; United States | 3:49.91 |
| T38 | Amen Allah Tissaoui; Tunisia | 4:12.91 | Nate Riech; Canada | 4:13.12 | Reece Langdon; Australia | 4:13.13 |
| T46 | Aleksandr Iaremchuk; Neutral Paralympic Athletes | 3:50.24 | Michael Roeger; Australia | 3:51.19 | Antoine Praud; France | 3:51.37 |
| T54 | Jin Hua; China | 2:49.93 | Marcel Hug; Switzerland | 2:52.59 | Dai Yunqiang; China | 2:53.54 PB |

== Results ==
The following were the results of the finals only of each of the Men's 1500 metres events in each of the classifications. Further details of each event, including where appropriate heats and semi finals results, are available on that event's dedicated page.

=== T11 ===
The T11 category is for athletes with a visual impairment. A T11 athlete may be entirely without sight, or be able to perceive light, but have no ability to see the shape of a hand at any distance. T11 athletes commonly run with guides.

The final in this classification will take place on 3 September 2024, at 10:08:

| Rank | Name | Nationality | Time | Notes |
|---|---|---|---|---|
| 1st place, gold medalist(s) | Yeltsin Jacques | Brazil | 3:55.82 | WR |
| 2nd place, silver medalist(s) | Yitayal Silesh Yigzaw | Ethiopia | 4:03.21 | |
| 3rd place, bronze medalist(s) | Júlio Cesar Agripino | Brazil | 4:04.03 | |
| 4 | Kenya Karasawa | Japan | 4:04.40 | AR |
| 5 | Jimmy Caicedo | Ecuador | 4:10.79 | |
| 6 | Aleksander Kossakowski | Poland | 4:18.86 | |

=== T13 ===
The T13 category is for athletes with a moderate visual impairment. Athletes in this category have a variety of visual impairments, but can typically recognize contours from a distance of 2 to 6 metres. Athletes in this category do not typically require a guide.

The final in this classification took place on 3 September 2024, at 10:17:

| Rank | Name | Nationality | Time | Notes |
|---|---|---|---|---|
| 1st place, gold medalist(s) | Aleksandr Kostin | Neutral Paralympic Athletes | 3:44.43 | PR |
| 2nd place, silver medalist(s) | Rouay Jebabli | Tunisia | 3:44.67 | AR |
| 3rd place, bronze medalist(s) | Anton Kuliatin | Neutral Paralympic Athletes | 3:44.94 | PB |
| 4 | Jaryd Clifford | Australia | 3:44.95 | SB |
| 5 | Yassine Ouhdadi El Ataby | Spain | 3:46.20 | WR |
| 6 | Abdellatif Baka | Algeria | 3:47.16 | AR |
| 7 | Joel Gomez | United States | 3:48.42 | AR |
| 8 | Mikail Al | Turkey | 3:55.34 | PB |

=== T20 ===
The T20 category is for athletes with intellectual impairment. T20 athletes have an IQ score of 75 or less.

The final in this classification took place on 6 September 2024, at 10:43:

| Rank | Name | Nationality | Time | Notes |
|---|---|---|---|---|
| 1st place, gold medalist(s) | Ben Sandilands | Great Britain | 3:45.40 | WR |
| 2nd place, silver medalist(s) | Sandro Baessa | Portugal | 3:49.46 | PB |
| 3rd place, bronze medalist(s) | Michael Brannigan | United States | 3:49.91 | |
| 4 | Ndiaga Dieng | Italy | 3:50.24 | |
| 5 | Daiki Akai | Japan | 3:57.58 | |
| 6 | Yuji Togawa | Japan | 4:02.68 | |
| 7 | Aaron Shorten | Ireland | 4:02.71 | SB |

=== T38 ===
The T38 category is for ambulant athletes with cerebral palsy. T38 athletes have the mildest form of impairment caused by cerebral palsy, often in only one limb, and not affecting the ability to run, walk or jump freely, although impairing performance. T38 athletes may suffer minor co-ordination difficulties.

The final in this classification took place on 7 September 2024, at 19:12:

| Rank | Class | Athlete | Nation | Time | Notes |
|---|---|---|---|---|---|
| 1st place, gold medalist(s) | T37 | Amen Allah Tissaoui | Tunisia | 4:12.91 | YC R8.1 |
| 2nd place, silver medalist(s) | T38 | Nate Riech | Canada | 4:13.12 | |
| 3rd place, bronze medalist(s) | T38 | Reece Langdon | Australia | 4:13.13 | |
| 4 | T38 | Angus Hincksman | Australia | 4:14.14 | |
| 5 | T38 | Abdelkrim Krai | Algeria | 4:16.19 | |
| 6 | T38 | Leo Merle | United States | 4:16.43 | |
| 7 | T37 | Renaud Clerc | France | 4:20.40 | |
| 8 | T38 | Teofilo Freitas | Timor-Leste | 4:30.10 | |

=== T46 ===
The T46 category is for athletes who have a single above or below elbow amputation or similar disability, with normal function in both legs.

The final in this classification took place on 31 August 2024, at 10:58:

| Rank | Name | Nationality | Time | Notes |
|---|---|---|---|---|
| 1st place, gold medalist(s) | Aleksandr Iaremchuk | Neutral Paralympic Athletes | 3:50.24 | |
| 2nd place, silver medalist(s) | Michael Roeger | Australia | 3:51.19 | |
| 3rd place, bronze medalist(s) | Antoine Praud | France | 3:51.37 | PB |
| 4 | Hristiyan Stoyanov | Bulgaria | 3:52.27 | |
| 5 | Samir Nouioua | Algeria | 3:57.30 | |
| 6 | Luke Nuttall | Great Britain | 3:57.62 | SB |
| 7 | Gemechu Dinsa | Ethiopia | 3:59.05 | |
| 8 | David Emong | Uganda | 4:01.48 | |
| 9 | Pradeep Puwakpitikande | Sri Lanka | 4:01.84 | |
| 10 | Christian Olsen | Denmark | 4:02.76 | |
| 11 | Mauricio Orrego | Chile | 4:06.03 | |
| 12 | Wesley Kimeli Sang | Kenya | 4:07.92 | |
| 13 | Bechir Agoubi | Tunisia | 4:09.72 | |
| 14 | Remy Nikobimeze | Burundi | 4:10.69 | SB |
| 15 | Grevist Bytyci | Kosovo | 4:32.88 | PB |
| – | Emmanuel Niyibizi | Rwanda | DQ | R18.2 |

=== T54 ===
The T54 category is for wheelchair athletes with no leg function, but near full arm function and reasonable to normal trunk function. Typically this may be caused by a lower spinal cord injury or spinal cord birth defect.

The final in this classification will take place on 3 September 2024, at 20:54:

| Rank | Name | Nationality | Time | Notes |
|---|---|---|---|---|
| 1st place, gold medalist(s) | Jin Hua | China | 2:40.93 | |
| 2nd place, silver medalist(s) | Marcel Hug | Switzerland | 2:52.59 | |
| 3rd place, bronze medalist(s) | Dai Yunqiang | China | 2:53.54 | PB |
| 4 | Phiphatphong Sianglam | Thailand | 2:53.71 | |
| 5 | Nathan Maguire | Great Britain | 2:53.76 | |
| 6 | Luo Xingchuan | China | 2:53.90 | PB |
| 7 | Suzuki Tomoki | Japan | 2:53.99 | |
| 8 | Yassine Gharbi | Tunisia | 2:54.27 | SB |
