= 2019 World Para Athletics Championships – Men's 1500 metres =

The men's 1500 metres at the 2019 World Para Athletics Championships was held in Dubai, United Arab Emirates in November 2019.

== Medalists ==
Event	Gold		Silver		Bronze	
T11 details	Julio Cesar Agripino dos Santos; Guide: Lutimar Abreu Paes; Brazil	4:07.02	Samwel Mushai Kimani; Guide: James Boit; Kenya	4.08.47 SB	Aleksander Kossakowski; Guide: Krzysztof Wasilewski; Poland	4:08.71 PB
T13 details	Jaryd Clifford; Australia	3:47.78 WR	Anton Kuliatin; Russia	3:47.91 AR	Abdellatif Baka; Algeria	3:49.30 CR
T20 details	Alexandr Rabotnitskii; Russia	3:57.28	Sandro Patricio Correia Baessa; Portugal	3:57.84 PB	Daniel Pek; Poland	3:58.33 SB
T38 details	Nate Riech; Canada	4:02.04 CR	Abdelkrim Krai; Algeria	4:04.70 AR	Deon Kenzie; Australia	4:08.49
T46 details	Hristiyan Stoyanov; Bulgaria	3:50.87 CR	Michael Roeger; Australia	3:51.99 AR	Aleksandr Iaremchuk; Russia	3:54.40
T52 details	Tomoki Sato; Japan	3:39.99 CR	Hirokazu Ueyonabaru; Japan	3:56.21	Tomoya Ito; Japan	3:56.52 PB
T54 details	Prawat Wahoram; Thailand	3:00.20	Zhang Yong; China	3:00.89	Marcel Hug; Switzerland	3:01.26
WR world record | AR area record | CR championship record | GR games record | NR national record | OR Olympic record | PB personal best | SB season best | WL world leading (in a given season)

== T11 ==
=== Records ===
World record	Samwel Mushai Kimani (KEN)	3:58.37	London, United Kingdom	3 September 2012
Championship record	Odair Santos (BRA)	4:04.70	Christchurch, New Zealand	25 January 2011

=== Schedule ===
Date	Time	Round
7 November	22:10	Round 1
8 November	20:18	Final

=== Round 1 ===
First 2 of each heat (Q) and the next 2 fastest (q) advance to the final.

Rank	Heat	Order	Sport Class	Name	Nationality	Time	Notes
1	1	1	T11	Julio Cesar Agripino dos Santos; Guide: Lutimar Abreu Paes	Brazil	4:11.70	Q
2	1	2	T11	Shinya Wada; Guide: Takashi Nakata	Japan	4:13.07	Q, PB
3	1	5	T11	Samwel Mushai Kimani; Guide: James Boit	Kenya	4:14.06	q
4	2	6	T11	Darwin Gustavo Castro Reyes; Guide: Diego Patricio Arevalo Vizhnay	Ecuador	4:15.75	Q
5	2	2	T11	Aleksander Kossakowski; Guide: Krzysztof Wasilewski	Poland	4:16.79	Q
6	2	3	T11	Kenya Karasawa; Guide: Hiroaki Mogi	Japan	4:18.13	q
7	2	4	T11	Wilson Bii; Guide: Erick Kirui	Kenya	4:18.36	
8	2	5	T11	Guillen Rosbil; Guide: Cereceda Ferdinan	Peru	4:19.00	PB
9	1	4	T11	Hasan Hüseyin Kaçar; Guide: Yahya Agac	Turkey	4:21.60	SB
10	1	6	T11	Manuel Garnica; Guide: Hassan Daniel Izzeddine Yelmo	Spain	4:27.41	SB
11	1	3	T11	Rodgers Kiprop; Guide: James Kimtai Chepkweko	Kenya	5:00.87	
	2	1	T11	Fedor Rudakov; Guide: Vladimir Miasnikov	Russia	DQ	R 7.9

=== Final ===
The final was started on 8 November at 20:18.

Rank	Order	Sport Class	Name	Nationality	Time	Notes
1st place, gold medalist(s)	2	T11	Julio Cesar Agripino dos Santos; Guide: Lutimar Abreu Paes	Brazil	4:07.02	
2nd place, silver medalist(s)	6	T11	Samwel Mushai Kimani; Guide: James Boit	Kenya	4:08.47	SB
3rd place, bronze medalist(s)	3	T11	Aleksander Kossakowski; Guide: Krzysztof Wasilewski	Poland	4:08.71	PB
4	5	T11	Shinya Wada; Guide: Takashi Nakata	Japan	4:11.42	PB
5	4	T11	Darwin Gustavo Castro Reyes; Guide: Diego Patricio Arevalo Vizhnay	Ecuador	4:11.49	PB
6	1	T11	Kenya Karasawa; Guide: Hiroaki Mogi	Japan	4:17.72	

== T13 ==
=== Records ===
T12	World record	Jaryd Clifford (AUS)	3:47.89	Sydney, Australia	7 April 2019
T12	Championship record	Odair Santos (BRA)	3:50.66	Assen, Netherlands	9 September 2006
T13	World record	Abdellatif Baka (ALG)	3:48.29	Rio de Janeiro, Brazil	11 September 2016
T13	Championship record	Abdellatif Baka (ALG)	3:52.82	London, United Kingdom	19 July 2017

=== Schedule ===
Date	Time	Round
7 November	20:47	Final

=== Final ===
The final was started on 7 November at 20:47.

Rank	Order	Sport Class	Name	Nationality	Time	Notes
1st place, gold medalist(s)	6	T12	Jaryd Clifford	Australia	3:47.78	WR
2nd place, silver medalist(s)	10	T12	Anton Kuliatin	Russia	3:47.91	AR
3rd place, bronze medalist(s)	1	T13	Abdellatif Baka	Algeria	3:49.30	CR
4	5	T13	Egor Sharov	Russia	3:50.60	AR
5	14	T12	Aleksandr Kostin	Russia	3:51.62	PB
6	3	T13	Serhii Bereziuk	Ukraine	3:55.02	PB
7	11	T13	Yassine Ouhdadi el Ataby	Spain	3:55.47	PB
8	2	T12	Rouay Jebabli	Tunisia	3:56.56 (.554)	PB
9	13	T12	Hicham Hanyn	Morocco	3:56.56 (.556)	PB
10	9	T13	Youssef Benibrahim	Morocco	3:58.32	SB
11	8	T13	Joel Gomez	United States	4:07.12	
12	4	T12	Nabil Maqableh	Jordan	4:07.54	PB
13	12	T12	Sixto Roman Moreta Criollo	Ecuador	4:09.26	
	7	T12	El Amin Chentouf	Morocco	DNF	

== T20 ==
=== Records ===
World record	Michael Brannigan (USA)	3:45.50	New York City, United States	11 February 2017
Championship record	Michael Brannigan (USA)	3:53.05	London, United Kingdom	17 July 2017

=== Schedule ===
Date	Time	Round
14 November	19:50	Final

=== Final ===
The final was started on 14 November at 19:50.

Rank	Order	Sport Class	Name	Nationality	Time	Notes
1st place, gold medalist(s)	11	T20	Alexandr Rabotnitskii	Russia	3:57.28	
2nd place, silver medalist(s)	4	T20	Sandro Patricio Correia Baessa	Portugal	3:57.84	PB
3rd place, bronze medalist(s)	2	T20	Daniel Pek	Poland	3:58.33	SB
4	14	T20	Pavlo Voluikevych	Ukraine	3:58.66	
5	6	T20	Pavel Sarkeev	Russia	3:58.87	
6	8	T20	Owen Miller	United Kingdom	3:59.87	
7	10	T20	Daiki Akai	Japan	4:01.23	
8	1	T20	Jose Azevedo	Portugal	4:01.43	
9	9	T20	Vladimir Samoliuk	Russia	4:03.86	PB
10	7	T20	Cristiano Pereira	Portugal	4:06.49	
11	12	T20	Sylwester Jaciuk	Poland	4:07.62	
12	3	T20	Mohamed Hersi	Denmark	4:07.90	PB
13	13	T20	Oguz Turker	Turkey	4:10.27	
14	5	T20	Michael Brannigan	United States	4:10.99	

== T38 ==
=== Records ===
T37	World record	Michael McKillop (IRL)	3:59.54	London, United Kingdom	8 May 2012
T37	Championship record	Michael McKillop (IRL)	4:10.17	Lyon, France	24 July 2013
T38	World record	Nate Riech (CAN)	3:57.00	Burnaby, Canada	13 June 2019
T38	Championship record	Deon Kenzie (AUS)	4:06.68	London, United Kingdom	22 July 2017

=== Schedule ===
Date	Time	Round
15 November	19:31	Final

=== Final ===
The final was started on 15 November at 19:31.

Rank	Order	Sport Class	Name	Nationality	Time	Notes
1st place, gold medalist(s)	3	T38	Nate Riech	Canada	4:02.04	CR
2nd place, silver medalist(s)	10	T38	Abdelkrim Krai	Algeria	4:04.70	AR
3rd place, bronze medalist(s)	2	T38	Deon Kenzie	Australia	4:08.49	
4	5	T37	Michael McKillop	Ireland	4:09.07	CR
5	1	T37	Liam Stanley	Canada	4:10.78	AR
6	15	T38	Abbes Saidi	Tunisia	4:13.09	SB
7	7	T38	Louis Radius	France	4:13.74	SB
8	11	T38	Felix Maximilian Sven Kruesemann	Germany	4:14.70	PB
9	14	T38	David Leavy	Ireland	4:23.86	PB
10	13	T37	Madjid Djemai	Algeria	4:24.85	SB
11	6	T38	Anders Lagergren	Denmark	4:25.20	PB
12	4	T38	Rédouane Hennouni-Bouzidi	France	4:26.47	
13	9	T38	Keegan Pitcher	New Zealand	4:35.77	PB
14	12	T37	Mohamed Mehdi Raiss Fakhroeddine	Spain	4:40.73	
15	16	T37	Petrus Karuli	Namibia	4:42.48	
16	8	T38	Basile Meunier	Belgium	4:50.14	SB

== T46 ==
=== Records ===
World record	Michael Roeger (AUS)	3:46.51	Sydney, Australia	4 February 2017
Championship record	Samir Nouioua (ALG)	3:50.74	Doha, Qatar	22 October 2015

=== Schedule ===
Date	Time	Round
7 November	21:40	Final

=== Final ===
The final was started on 7 November at 21:40.

Rank	Lane	Sport Class	Name	Nationality	Time	Notes
1st place, gold medalist(s)	8	T46	Hristiyan Stoyanov	Bulgaria	3:50.87	CR
2nd place, silver medalist(s)	13	T46	Michael Roeger	Australia	3:51.99	AR
3rd place, bronze medalist(s)	3	T46	Aleksandr Iaremchuk	Russia	3:54.40	
4	9	T46	Gemechu Amenu Dinsa	Ethiopia	3:57.95	PB
5	11	T46	Stanley Kipkoech Misik	Kenya	3:58.49	PB
6	7	T46	Wesley Kimeli Sang	Kenya	4:02.07	PB
7	1	T46	Marufjon Murodulloev	Uzbekistan	4:03.87	PB
8	2	T46	Manuel Ernestro Jaime	Angola	4:04.53	PB
9	14	T46	Samir Nouioua	Algeria	4:04.68	SB
10	6	T46	Remy Nikobimeze	Burundi	4:04.72	PB
11	10	T46	Hermas Muvunyi	Rwanda	4:08.70	
12	15	T46	Johannes Bessell	Germany	4:11.00	PB
13	4	T46	Mauricio Esteban Orrego Campos	Chile	4:23.55	
14	12	T46	Muhamad Ashraf Muhammad Haisham	Malaysia	4:26.30	
	5	T46	David Emong	Uganda	DQ	R 18.2 (b)

== T52 ==
=== Records ===
World record	Tomoki Sato (JPN)	3:25.08	Machida City, Japan	1 July 2018
Championship record	Tomoki Sato (JPN)	3:45.89	London, United Kingdom	16 July 2017

=== Schedule ===
Date	Time	Round
15 November	19:51	Final

=== Final ===
The final was started on 15 November at 19:51.

Rank	Order	Sport Class	Name	Nationality	Time	Notes
1st place, gold medalist(s)	1	T52	Tomoki Sato	Japan	3:39.99	CR
2nd place, silver medalist(s)	3	T52	Hirokazu Ueyonabaru	Japan	3:56.21	
3rd place, bronze medalist(s)	6	T52	Tomoya Ito	Japan	3:56.52	PB
4	5	T52	Leonardo de Jesús Pérez Juárez	Mexico	3:59.05	
5	2	T52	Isaiah Rigo	United States	4:01.73	
6	7	T52	Kęstutis Skučas	Lithuania	4:01.96	PB
7	4	T52	Peth Rungsri	Thailand	4:02.02	PB
8	8	T52	Fabian Blum	Switzerland	5:00.45	

== T54 ==
=== Records ===
World record	Brent Lakatos (CAN)	2:51.84	Nottwil, Switzerland	3 June 2017
Championship record	Marcel Hug (SUI)	2:59.96	Lyon, France	25 July 2013

=== Schedule ===
Date	Time	Round
11 November	9:41	Round 1
11 November	18:34	Final

=== Round 1 ===
First 3 of each heat (Q) and the next 1 fastest (q) advance to the final.

Rank	Order	Lane	Sport Class	Name	Nationality	Time	Notes
1	2	3	T54	Daniel Romanchuk	United States	3:07.63	Q
2	2	7	T54	Alexey Bychenok	Russia	3:07.74	Q
3	2	2	T54	Rawat Tana	Thailand	3:08.14	Q
4	2	4	T54	Masayuki Higuchi	Japan	3:08.25	q
5	2	1	T54	Richard Chiassaro	United Kingdom	3:08.73	
6	2	5	T54	Badir Abbas Alhosani	United Arab Emirates	3:08.98	
7	3	1	T54	Prawat Wahoram	Thailand	3:09.26	Q
8	3	2	T54	Marcel Hug	Switzerland	3:09.46	Q
9	3	7	T54	Alhassane Baldé	Germany	3:09.75	Q
10	3	5	T53	Brent Lakatos	Canada	3:10.12	
11	1	7	T54	Zhang Yong	China	3:10.59	Q
12	3	6	T54	Sho Watanabe	Japan	3:10.61	
13	2	6	T54	Josh Cassidy	Canada	3:10.79	
14	1	1	T54	Tomoki Suzuki	Japan	3:10.89	Q
15	3	4	T54	Faisal Alrajehi	Kuwait	3:10.99	
16	1	3	T54	Jake Lappin	Australia	3:11.81	Q
17	3	8	T54	Ma Zhuo	China	3:11.84	
18	3	3	T53	Joshua George	United States	3:13.94	
19	2	8	T54	Yang Yaoxiong	China	3:14.83	
20	1	2	T54	Alejandro Maldonado	Argentina	3:16.54	
21	1	4	T54	Ludwig Malter	Austria	3:16.96	
22	1	5	T54	Aaron Pike	United States	4:34.15	qJ
	1	9	T54	Alexandre Dupont	Canada	DNF	
	1	6	T54	Yassine Gharbi	Tunisia	DNF	
	1	8	T54	Putharet Khongrak	Thailand	DNF	

=== Final ===
The final was started on 11 November at 18:34.

Rank	Order	Sport Class	Name	Nationality	Time	Notes
1st place, gold medalist(s)	3	T54	Prawat Wahoram	Thailand	3:00.20	
2nd place, silver medalist(s)	1	T54	Zhang Yong	China	3:00.89	
3rd place, bronze medalist(s)	8	T54	Marcel Hug	Switzerland	3:01.26	
4	9	T54	Rawat Tana	Thailand	3:02.69	
5	5	T54	Daniel Romanchuk	United States	3:02.95	
6	4	T54	Jake Lappin	Australia	3:03.27	
7	6	T54	Alexey Bychenok	Russia	3:03.53	
8	2	T54	Tomoki Suzuki	Japan	3:03.71	
9	10	T54	Masayuki Higuchi	Japan	3:04.92	
10	7	T54	Alhassane Baldé	Germany	3:05.99	
11	11	T54	Aaron Pike	United States	3:10.90	

== See also ==
- List of IPC world records in athletics
