= Athletics at the 2024 Summer Paralympics – Men's 1500 metres T38 =

Men's 1500 metres T38 at the XVII Paralympic Games
- Venue: Stade de France, Paris, France
- Dates: 7 September 2024
- Competitors: 8 from 7 nations
- Winning time: 4:12.91

Medalists
1st place, gold medalist(s)		Amen Allah Tissaoui	Tunisia
2nd place, silver medalist(s)		Nate Riech	Canada
3rd place, bronze medalist(s)		Reece Langdon	Australia

1500 metres at the 2024 Summer Paralympics
Men's · T11 · T13 · T20 · T38 · T46 · T54 · Women's · T11 · T13 · T20 · T54

The Men's 1500 metres T38 at the 2024 Summer Paralympics took place on 7 September 2024 at the Stade de France in Paris.

== Records ==
T37
World Record	Amen Allah Tissaoui (TUN)	3:58.31	(Japan) Kobe	25 May 2024
Paralympic Record	Liam Stanley (CAN)	4:06.95	(Japan) Tokyo	4 September 2021

Area	Athlete	Time	Location	Date
Africa	(Tunisia) Amen Allah Tissaoui	3:58.31 WR	(Japan) Kobe	25 May 2024
America	(Canada) Liam Stanley	4:05.27	(Canada) Victoria	27 Mar 2021
Asia	(India) Raman Sharma	4:20.80	(China) Hangzhou	27 October 2023
Europe	(Republic of Ireland) Michael McKillop	3:59.54	(United Kingdom) London	8 May 2012
Oceania	(Australia) Brad Scott	4:14.47	(United Kingdom) London	3 September 2012

T38
World Record	Nate Riech (CAN)	3:47.89	(United States) Portland	29 May 2021
Paralympic Record	Nate Riech (CAN)	3:58.92	(Japan) Tokyo	4 September 2021

Area	Athlete	Time	Location	Date
Africa	(Algeria) Abdelkrim Krai	4:00.94	(Japan) Kobe	25 May 2024
America	(Canada) Nate Riech	3:47.89 WR	(United States) Portland	29 May 2021
Asia	(Timor-Leste) Teofilas Freitas	4:21.74	(China) Hangzhou	23 October 2023
Europe	(France) Redouane Hennouni-Bouzidi	4:01.52	(United Arab Emirates) Dubai	24 March 2022
Oceania	(Australia) Reece Langdon	3:52.94	(Australia) Brisbane	9 April 2022

== Classification ==
The event is open to T37 and 38 athletes.They are movement and coordination affected to a low degree in the lower trunk and legs, down one side or the whole body.

They show asymmetry and slightly reduced co-ordination of muscle movement. Their running style is smoothed out as they increase in speed.

== Results ==
=== Final ===
The final was held on 7 September 2024

Rank	Class	Athlete	Nation	Time	Notes
1st place, gold medalist(s)	T37	Amen Allah Tissaoui	Tunisia	4:12.91	YC R8.1
2nd place, silver medalist(s)	T38	Nate Riech	Canada	4:13.12	
3rd place, bronze medalist(s)	T38	Reece Langdon	Australia	4:13.13	
4	T38	Angus Hincksman	Australia	4:14.14	
5	T38	Abdelkrim Krai	Algeria	4:16.19	
6	T38	Leo Merle	United States	4:16.43	
7	T37	Renaud Clerc	France	4:20.40	
8	T38	Teofilo Freitas	Timor-Leste	4:30.10	
