= Athletics at the 2016 Summer Paralympics – Men's 1500 metres =

The Men's 1500m athletics events for the 2016 Summer Paralympics took place at the Estádio Olímpico João Havelange from 8 to 17 September. A total of six events were contested over this distance for eight different classifications.

== Schedule ==
R	Round 1	½	Semifinals	F	Final

Event↓/Date →	Thu 8	Fri 9	Sat 10	Sun 11	Mon 12	Tue 13	Wed 14	Thu 15	Fri 16	Sat 17
T11 1500m				R		F				
T13 1500m				F						
T20 1500m						F				
T37 1500m				F						
T38 1500m			F							
T46 1500m									F	
T52 1500m								F		
T54 1500m					R	F				

== Medal summary ==
Classification	Gold		Silver		Bronze	
T11	Samwel Mushai Kimani guide: James Boit; Kenya	4:03.25 SB	Odair Santos; Brazil	4:03.85 SB	Semih Deniz guide: Muhammed Emin Tan; Turkey	4:05.42 PB
T13	Abdellatif Baka; Algeria	3:48.29 WR	Tamiru Demisse; Ethiopia	3:48.49 PB	Henry Kirwa; Kenya	3:49.59 PB
T20	Michael Brannigan; United States	3:51.73	Daniel Pek; Poland	3:56.17	Peyman Nasiri Bazanjani; Iran	3:56.24
T37	Michael McKillop; Ireland	4:12.11	Liam Stanley; Canada	4:16.72	Madjid Djemai; Algeria	4:17.28
T38	Abbes Saidi; Tunisia	4:13.81	Deon Kenzie; Australia	4:14.95	Louis Radius; France	4:17.19
T46 (inc T45)	Samir Nouioua; Algeria	3:59.46 SB	David Emong; Uganda	4:00.62 SB	Michael Roeger; Australia	4:01.34
T52 (inc T51)	Raymond Martin; United States	3:40.63 PR	Tomoki Sato; Japan	3:41.70	Pichaya Kurattanasiri; Thailand	3:53.96 PB
T54	Prawat Wahoram; Thailand	3:00.62	Marcel Hug; Switzerland	3:00.65	Saichon Konjen; Thailand	3:00.86 SB

== Results ==
=== T11 ===
The T11 category is for athletes with a visual impairment. A T11 athlete may be entirely without sight, or be able to perceive light, but have no ability to see the shape of a hand at any distance. T11 athletes commonly run with guides.

18:05 13 September 2016:

Rank	Lane	Bib	Name	Nationality	Reaction	Time	Notes
1st place, gold medalist(s)	3	1762	Samwel Mushai Kimani	Kenya		4:03.25	
2nd place, silver medalist(s)	2	1162	Odair Santos	Brazil		4:03.85	
3rd place, bronze medalist(s)	1	2288	Semih Deniz	Turkey		4:05.42	
4	5	1761	Wilson Bii	Kenya		4:07.96	
5	6	1206	Jason Joseph Dunkerley	Canada		4:07.98	
6	4	1746	Shinya Wada	Japan		4:15.62	

=== T13 ===
The T13 category is for athletes with a moderate visual impairment. Athletes in this category have a variety of visual impairments, but can typically recognize contours from a distance of 2 to 6 metres. Athletes in this category do not typically require a guide.

Competed 11 September 2016 at 23:32.

Rank	Athlete	Country	Class	Time	Notes
1st place, gold medalist(s)	Abdellatif Baka	Algeria	T13	3:48.29	WR
2nd place, silver medalist(s)	Tamiru Demisse	Ethiopia	T13	3:48.49	PB
3rd place, bronze medalist(s)	Henry Kirwa	Kenya	T12	3:49.59	PB
4	Fouad Baka	Algeria	T13	3:49.84	PB
5	Lukasz Wietecki	Poland	T13	3:54.20	
6	Bilel Aloui	Tunisia	T13	3:54.61	PB
7	Jaryd Clifford	Australia	T12	3:56.67	
8	Youssef Benibrahim	Morocco	T13	3:56.80	
9	Guillaume Ouellet	Canada	T13	3:57.98	
10	Chaz Davis	United States	T12	3:58.28	
11	Yeltsin Jacques	Brazil	T12	3:58.92	
12	Julio Cesar Agripino dos Santos	Brazil	T12	4:00.61	
13	Abdelillah Mame	Morocco	T13	4:08.93	
14	Bilel Hammami	Tunisia	T13	DQ	

=== T20 ===
The T20 category is for athletes with intellectual impairment. T20 athletes have an IQ score of 75 or less.

There were no heats in this event. The final was competed at 10:58 on 13 September 2016:

Rank	Lane	Bib	Name	Nationality	Reaction	Time	Notes
1st place, gold medalist(s)	2	2346	Michael Brannigan	United States		3:51.73	
2nd place, silver medalist(s)	8	2031	Daniel Pek	Poland		3:56.17	
3rd place, bronze medalist(s)	5	1656	Peyman Nasiri Bazanjani	Iran		3:56.24	
4	6	2024	Rafal Korc	Poland		3:56.54	
5	3	2331	Pavlo Voluikevych	Ukraine		3:58.18	
6	1	1514	Steve Morris	Great Britain		3:58.69	
7	7	2051	Cristiano Pereira	Portugal		3:59.92	
8	9	2411	Luis Arturo Paiva	Venezuela		4:11.20	
9	4	1379	Mohamed Hersi	Denmark		4:11.41	

=== T37 ===
The T37 category is for ambulant athletes with cerebral palsy. These athletes have movement and coordination problems on one half of their body. They have good ability in their dominant side of their body (ie hemiplegia).

There were no heats in this event. The final was competed 11 September 2016 at 16:59.

Rank	Athlete	Country	Time	Notes
1st place, gold medalist(s)	Michael McKillop	Ireland	4:12.11	
2nd place, silver medalist(s)	Liam Stanley	Canada	4:16.72	
3rd place, bronze medalist(s)	Madjid Djemai	Algeria	4:17.28	
4	Hafid Aharak	Morocco	4:20.43	PB
5	Shayne Dobson	Canada	4:21.06	PB
6	Brad Scott	Australia	4:25.98	
7	Mariano Dominguez	Argentina	4:46.42	PB
8	Ivan Espinosa	Virgin Islands	5:07.00	

=== T38 ===
The T38 category is for ambulant athletes with cerebral palsy. T38 athletes have the mildest form of impairment caused by cerebral palsy, often in only one limb, and not affecting the ability to run, walk or jump freely, although impairing performance. T38 athletes may suffer minor co-ordination difficulties.

19:19 10 September 2016:

Rank	Lane	Bib	Name	Nationality	Reaction	Time	Notes
1st place, gold medalist(s)	2	2279	Abbes Saidi	Tunisia		4:13.81	
2nd place, silver medalist(s)	5	1055	Deon Kenzie	Australia		4:14.95	
3rd place, bronze medalist(s)	7	1475	Louis Radius	France		4:17.19	
4	6	1204	Mitchell Chase	Canada		4:28.44	
5	1	1381	Christoffer Vienberg	Denmark		4:31.68	
6	4	1368	Daniel Hyna	Czech Republic		4:42.33	
7	8	1102	Basile Meunier	Belgium		4:54.77	
	3	1873	Angel Moises Enriquez Torres	Mexico			DSQ

=== T46 ===
The T46 category is for athletes who have a single above or below elbow amputation or similar disability, with normal function in both legs.

18:20 16 September 2016:

Rank	Lane	Bib	Name	Nationality	Reaction	Time	Notes
1st place, gold medalist(s)	1	1019	Samir Nouioua	Algeria		3:59.46	
2nd place, silver medalist(s)	4	2316	David Emong	Uganda		4:00.62	
3rd place, bronze medalist(s)	2	1062	Michael Roeger	Australia		4:01.34	
4	6	2269	Bechir Agoubi	Tunisia		4:05.07	
5	5	2098	Hermas Muvunyi	Rwanda		4:05.19	
6	8	1444	Hailu Haile	Ethiopia		4:06.37	
7	10	1178	Hristiyan Stoyanov	Bulgaria		4:08.99	
8	9	1095	Remy Nikobimeze	Burundi		4:10.00	
9	3	1443	Astbha Gebre Gebremeskel	Ethiopia		4:15.01	
10	7	1840	Revelinot Raherinandrasana	Madagascar		4:38.60	
	11	1247	Chaoyan Li	China			DSQ

=== T52 ===
The T52 category is for wheelchair athletes with damage to spinal cord in the higher parts of the back, substantially impaired or no trunk function, and minimal or no leg function. Pushing power comes from elbow extensions, and appears close to normal except for use of modified gloves to compensate for grip.

10:24 15 September 2016:

Rank	Lane	Bib	Name	Nationality	Reaction	Time	Notes
1st place, gold medalist(s)	7	2363	Raymond Martin	United States		3:40.63	
2nd place, silver medalist(s)	6	1741	Tomoki Sato	Japan		3:41.70	
3rd place, bronze medalist(s)	4	2231	Pichaya Kurattanasiri	Thailand		3:53.96	
4	10	1745	Hirokazu Ueyonabaru	Japan		3:54.04	
5	9	2380	Steven Toyoji	United States		3:54.64	
6	5	1428	Santiago Sanz	Spain		3:55.90	
7	3	1309	Cristian Torres	Colombia		3:56.90	
8	1	1881	Leonardo de Jesus Perez Juarez	Mexico		4:23.83	
9	2	2370	Josh Roberts	United States		4:47.80	
	8	1737	Akikazu Noda	Japan			DSQ

=== T54 ===
The T54 category is for wheelchair athletes with no leg function, but near full arm function and reasonable to normal trunk function. Typically this may be caused by a lower spinal cord injury or spinal cord birth defect.

18:22 13 September 2016:

Rank	Lane	Bib	Name	Nationality	Reaction	Time	Notes
1st place, gold medalist(s)	5	2236	Prawat Wahoram	Thailand		3:00.62	
2nd place, silver medalist(s)	2	2179	Marcel Hug	Switzerland		3:00.65	
3rd place, bronze medalist(s)	8	2229	Saichon Konjen	Thailand		3:00.86	
4	7	1523	David Weir	Great Britain		3:01.08	
5	9	1051	Kurt Fearnley	Australia		3:01.35	
6	4	1536	Alhassane Balde	Germany		3:01.62	
7	1	1251	Chengming Liu	China		3:01.84	
8	6	1731	Masayuki Higuchi	Japan		3:02.05	
9	3	1777	Suk Man Hong	South Korea		3:02.21	
	10	2234	Rawat Tana	Thailand			DSQ
