= 2025 World Para Athletics Championships – Men's 1500 metres =

The men's 1500 metres events at the 2025 World Para Athletics Championships were held at the Jawaharlal Nehru Stadium, Delhi in New Delhi.

== Medalists ==
Event	Gold	Silver	Bronze
T11	Yeltsin Jacques; Brazil	Júlio Cesar Agripino; Brazil	Fedor Rudakov; Neutral Paralympic Athletes
T13	Joel Gomez; United States	Aleksandr Kostin; Neutral Paralympic Athletes	Jaryd Clifford; Australia
T20	Michael Brannigan; United States	Natsuki Toda; Japan	Sandro Baessa; Portugal
T38	Nate Tucker; Canada	Amen Allah Tissaoui; Tunisia	Angus Hincksman; Australia
T46	Aleksandr Iaremchuk; Neutral Paralympic Athletes	Antoine Praud; France	Pradeep Puwakpitikande; Sri Lanka
T52	Tomoki Sato; Japan	Hirokazu Ueyonabaru; Japan	Leonardo de Jesús Pérez Juárez; Mexico
T54	Jin Hua; China	Luo Xingchuan; China	Nathan Maguire; Great Britain

== T11 ==
Final

The event took place on 30 September.

Rank	Name	Nationality	Time	Notes
1st place, gold medalist(s)	Yeltsin Jacques	Brazil	4:02.02	CR
2nd place, silver medalist(s)	Júlio Cesar Agripino	Brazil	4:05.61	SB
3rd place, bronze medalist(s)	Fedor Rudakov	Neutral Paralympic Athletes	4:06.51	SB
4	Samwel Mushai Kimani	Kenya	4:08.80	SB
5	Kenya Karasawa	Japan	4:11.25	
6	Shinya Wada	Japan	4:17.36	

Round 1

The event took place on 29 September. Qualification: First 3 in each heat (Q) advance to the Final

Rank	Heat	Name	Nationality	Time	Notes
1	2	Yeltsin Jacques	Brazil	4:08.94	Q
2	1	Júlio Cesar Agripino	Brazil	4:09.51	Q, SB
3	1	Kenya Karasawa	Japan	4:09.63	Q, SB
4	1	Samwel Mushai Kimani	Kenya	4:09.98	Q, SB
5	2	Fedor Rudakov	Neutral Paralympic Athletes	4:10.77	Q, SB
6	2	Shinya Wada	Japan	4:11.32	Q
7	2	Darwin Castro	Ecuador	4:14.32	SB
8	1	Aleksander Kossakowski	Poland	4:20.14	

== T13 ==
Final

The event took place on 30 September.

Rank	Name	Nationality	Time	Notes
1st place, gold medalist(s)	Joel Gomez	United States	3:57.71	
2nd place, silver medalist(s)	Aleksandr Kostin	Neutral Paralympic Athletes	3:57.80	SB
3rd place, bronze medalist(s)	Jaryd Clifford	Australia	3:58.87	
4	Mikail Al	Turkey	4:00.46	SB
5	Abdelhadi Boudra	Algeria	4:00.52	
6	Jean Oliveira da Silva	Brazil	4:03.33	PB
7	Jonas Oryema	Uganda	4:04.49	
8	John Lokedi	Kenya	4:05.84	
9	Sixto Roman Moreta Criollo	Ecuador	4:09.70	SB
10	Nabeel Maqableh	Jordan	4:12.80	
11	Arthur Milles	Great Britain	4:12.92	
12	Nicholas Neri	Canada	4:18.15	

Round 1

The event took place on 29 September. Qualification: First 4 in each heat (Q) and the next 4 fastest (q) advance to the Final

Rank	Heat	Name	Nationality	Time	Notes
1	2	Jonas Oryema	Uganda	4:01.62	Q, PB
2	2	John Lokedi	Kenya	4:03.98	Q, SB
3	2	Joel Gomez	United States	4:04.17	Q
4	2	Jaryd Clifford	Australia	4:04.58	Q
5	2	Nabeel Maqableh	Jordan	4:06.70	q, PB
6	2	Sixto Roman Moreta Criollo	Ecuador	4:10.25	q, SB
7	2	Nicholas Neri	Canada	4:10.66	q
8	1	Mikail Al	Turkey	4:18.47	Q
9	1	Aleksandr Kostin	Neutral Paralympic Athletes	4:18.73	Q, SB
10	1	Arthur Milles	Great Britain	4:18.92	Q
11	1	Abdelhadi Boudra	Algeria	4:18.93	Q
12	1	Jean Oliveira da Silva	Brazil	4:19.16	q, SB
13	1	Isaías Gomes	Portugal	4:19.26	
14	1	William Short	Australia	4:23.06	
15	2	Cyril Cloyd Ongcoy	Philippines	4:34.28	

== T20 ==
Final

The event took place on 4 October.

Rank	Name	Nationality	Time	Notes
1st place, gold medalist(s)	Michael Brannigan	United States	3:50.44	CR
2nd place, silver medalist(s)	Natsuki Toda	Japan	3:52.45	PB
3rd place, bronze medalist(s)	Sandro Baessa	Portugal	3:55.00	
4	Ndiaga Dieng	Italy	3:55.57	SB
5	Mehmet Emin Eğilmez	Turkey	3:56.17	PB
6	Meshal Mahutan	Saudi Arabia	3:57.09	
7	Gaël Geffroy	France	3:59.51	
8	Gavriil Arampatzis	Greece	4:00.31	
9	Yuji Togawa	Japan	4:00.45	
10	Yuki Iwata	Japan	4:00.81	
11	Dionibel Rodríguez	Spain	4:03.53	
12	Cristiano Pereira	Portugal	4:07.62	

Round 1

The event took place on 3 October. Qualification: First 6 in each heat (Q) advance to the Final

Rank	Heat	Name	Nationality	Time	Notes
1	2	Michael Brannigan	United States	3:56.95	Q
2	2	Natsuki Toda	Japan	3:57.33	Q
3	2	Meshal Mahutan	Saudi Arabia	4:01.07	Q
4	2	Mehmet Emin Eğilmez	Turkey	4:01.14	Q, PB
5	2	Yuki Iwata	Japan	4:01.52	Q
6	2	Cristiano Pereira	Portugal	4:03.05	Q, SB
7	1	Yuji Togawa	Japan	4:09.03	Q
8	2	Cha Soo-myeong	South Korea	4:09.69	
9	1	Gavriil Arampatzis	Greece	4:11.15	Q
10	1	Gaël Geffroy	France	4:11.57	Q
11	1	Dionibel Rodríguez	Spain	4:12.07	Q
12	1	Sandro Baessa	Portugal	4:12.25	Q
13	1	Ndiaga Dieng	Italy	4:14.10	Q, SB
14	2	Michael Barber	Canada	4:14.33	
15	1	Abdulmajeed Ghafiry	Saudi Arabia	4:15.35	
16	1	Daniel Milone	Australia	4:17.02	
17	2	Maksim Angelov	Neutral Paralympic Athletes	4:18.35	SB
	1	Ben Sandilands	Great Britain	DNS	

== T38 ==
Final

The event took place on 5 October.

Rank	Name	Nationality	Class	Time	Notes
1st place, gold medalist(s)	Nate Tucker	Canada	T38	3:57.98	CR
2nd place, silver medalist(s)	Amen Allah Tissaoui	Tunisia	T37	3:58.17	WR
3rd place, bronze medalist(s)	Angus Hincksman	Australia	T38	3:58.19	
4	Reece Langdon	Australia	T38	3:59.81	
5	Alexandros Diamantis Skourtis	Greece	T38	4:00.32	ER
6	Leo Merle	United States	T38	4:00.47	PB
7	Felix Maximilian Sven Kruesemann	Germany	T38	4:03.10	
8	Renaud Clerc	France	T37	4:03.91	
9	Liam Stanley	Canada	T38	4:07.31	
10	Skjalg Kongssund	Norway	T38	4:20.23	PB
11	Mads Ottogren Eskar	Denmark	T38	4:27.86	
12	Ben Eppelstun	Australia	T38	4:29.29	
13	Anders Lagergren	Denmark	T38	4:45.25	

== T46 ==
Final

The event took place on 4 October.

Rank	Name	Nationality	Class	Time	Notes
1st place, gold medalist(s)	Aleksandr Iaremchuk	Neutral Paralympic Athletes	T46	3:53.26	SB
2nd place, silver medalist(s)	Antoine Praud	France	T46	3:53.62	SB
3rd place, bronze medalist(s)	Pradeep Puwakpitikande	Sri Lanka	T46	3:53.77	AS
4	Luke Nuttall	Great Britain	T46	3:57.49	SB
5	Evans Rutto	Kenya	T46	3:57.85	PB
6	David Emong	Uganda	T46	3:58.17	SB
7	Wesley Kimeli Sang	Kenya	T46	4:07.13	
8	Rabah Boussaid	Algeria	T46	4:16.72	
9	King James Reyes	Philippines	T46	4:19.75	SB

== T52 ==
Final

The event took place on 5 October.

Rank	Name	Nationality	Class	Time	Notes
1st place, gold medalist(s)	Tomoki Sato	Japan	T52	3:30.19	CR
2nd place, silver medalist(s)	Hirokazu Ueyonabaru	Japan	T52	3:57.75	
3rd place, bronze medalist(s)	Leonardo de Jesús Pérez Juárez	Mexico	T52	3:58.85	
4	Jerrold Mangliwan	Philippines	T52	4:00.70	SB
5	Thomas Geierspichler	Austria	T52	4:01.90	
6	Kęstutis Skučas	Lithuania	T52	4:12.13	SB
	Jonathan Thorsell	Sweden	T52	DNS	

== T54 ==
Final

The event took place on 2 October.

Rank	Name	Nationality	Time	Notes
1st place, gold medalist(s)	Jin Hua	China	2:50.46	CR
2nd place, silver medalist(s)	Luo Xingchuan	China	2:51.28	PB
3rd place, bronze medalist(s)	Nathan Maguire	Great Britain	2:51.51	
4	Marcel Hug	Switzerland	2:51.75	
5	Yassine Gharbi	Tunisia	2:51.85	AF
6	Dai Yunqiang	China	2:51.98	PB
7	Thibault Daurat	France	2:52.73	
8	Julien Casoli	France	2:53.02	
9	Hiroki Kishizawa	Japan	2:53.24	
10	Lito Anker	Netherlands	2:55.13	
11	Samuel Carter	Australia	2:59.20	

Round 1

The event took place on 1 October. Qualification: First 5 in each heat (Q) advance to the Final

Rank	Heat	Name	Nationality	Time	Notes
1	1	Jin Hua	China	2:52.30	Q, CR
2	1	Luo Xingchuan	China	2:52.56	Q, PB
3	1	Nathan Maguire	Great Britain	2:53.36	Q
4	1	Julien Casoli	France	2:53.75	Q
5	1	Lito Anker	Netherlands	2:56.08	Q
6	1	Putharet Khongrak	Thailand	3:00.32	
7	1	Samuel Rizzo	Australia	3:02.24	
8	2	Marcel Hug	Switzerland	3:12.16	Q
9	2	Hiroki Kishizawa	Japan	3:12.33	Q
10	2	Dai Yunqiang	China	3:12.36	Q, SB
11	2	Samuel Carter	Australia	3:12.57	Q
12	2	Yassine Gharbi	Tunisia	3:12.71	Q
13	1	Ludwig Malter	Austria	3:12.77	SB
14	2	Cedric Ravet	Mauritius	3:13.83	
15	2	Maxime Carabin	Belgium	3:32.92	
	2	Thibault Daurat	France	DNF	qR
	2	Phiphatphong Sianglam	Thailand	DQ	
