= 2023 World Para Athletics Championships – Men's 1500 metres =

The men's 1500 metres at the 2023 World Para Athletics Championships were held across 7 classifications at Charlety Stadium, Paris, France, from 9 to 17 July.

== Medalists ==
Event	Gold	Silver	Bronze
T11	Yeltsin Jacques; Brazil	Kenya Karasawa; Japan	Aleksander Kossakowski; Poland
T13	Rouay Jebabli; Tunisia	Yassine Ouhdadi; Spain	Abdellatif Baka; Algeria
T20	Ben Sandilands; Great Britain	Michael Brannigan; United States	Sandro Baessa; Portugal
T38	Nate Riech; Canada	Reece Langdon; Australia	Angus Hincksman; Australia
T46	Hristiyan Stoyanov; Bulgaria	Michael Roeger; Australia	Bechir Agoubi; Tunisia
T52	Tomoki Sato; Japan	Thomas Geierspichler; Austria	Pichaya Kurattanasiri; Thailand
T54	Marcel Hug; Switzerland	Brent Lakatos; Canada	Prawat Wahoram; Thailand

== T11 ==
The event took place on 13 July.

Rank	Lane	Name	Nationality	Time	Notes
1st place, gold medalist(s)	4	Yeltsin Jacques	Brazil	4:03.83	CR
2nd place, silver medalist(s)	1	Kenya Karasawa	Japan	4:08.26	SB
3rd place, bronze medalist(s)	5	Aleksander Kossakowski	Poland	4:08.34	PB
4	6	Jimmy Caicedo	Ecuador	4:10.23	PB
5	3	Shinya Wada	Japan	4:10.45	SB
	2	Júlio César Agripino	Brazil		DNF

== T13 ==
The final of this event was held at 9:55 on 13 Jul 2023.

Rank	Lane	Name	Nationality	Time	Notes
1st place, gold medalist(s)	7	Rouay Jebabli	Tunisia	4:00.23	
2nd place, silver medalist(s)	8	Yassine Ouhdadi El Ataby	Spain	4:00.91	
3rd place, bronze medalist(s)	4	Abdellatif Baka	Algeria	4:01.13	
4	1	Mikail Al	Turkey	4:01.50	PB
5	5	Achraf Lahouel	Tunisia	4:01.64	
6	3	Joel Gomez	United States	4:02.32	
7	6	John Lokedi	Kenya	4:09.73	
8	2	Oussama Hmimsa	Morocco	4:12.14	

== T20 ==
The final of this event was held at 9:30 on 17 July 2023.

Rank	Lane	Name	Nationality	Time	Notes
1st place, gold medalist(s)		Ben Sandilands	Great Britain	3:52.42	CR
2nd place, silver medalist(s)		Michael Brannigan	United States	3:53.50	SB
3rd place, bronze medalist(s)		Sandro Baessa	Portugal	3:54.04	PB
4		Ndiaga Dieng	Italy	3:54.78	PB
5		Gael Geffroy	France	3:57.81	PB
6		Pavlo Voluikevych	Ukraine	3:57.96	SB
7		Owen Miller	Great Britain	3:58.22	
8		Daiki Akai	Japan	3:58.44	SB
9		Michael Barber	Canada	3:58.64	PB
10		Yuki Iwata	Japan	3:59.16	SB
11		Yuji Togawa	Japan	3:59.19	
12		Mohamed Hersi	Denmark	4:01.34	PB
13		Steven Bryce	Great Britain	4:03.80	
14		Aaron Noel Shorten	Ireland	4:04.75	
15		Daniel Milone	Australia	4:08.84	AR

== T38 ==
The final of this event was held at 18:52 on 17 July 2023.

Rank	Lane	Name	Nationality	Time	Notes
1st place, gold medalist(s)		Nate Riech	Canada	4:03.07	
2nd place, silver medalist(s)		Reece Langdon	Australia	4:04.30	
3rd place, bronze medalist(s)		Angus Hincksman	Australia	4:05.18	
4		Leo Merle	United States	4:06.13	PB
5		Deon Kenzie	Australia	4:06.59	
6		Abdelkrim Krai	Algeria	4:08.05	SB
7		Liam Stanley	Canada	4:09.28	
8		Renaud Clerc	France	4:15.00	
9		Anders Lagergren	Denmark	4:15.48	PB
10		Mads Ottogren Eskar	Denmark	4:25.35	PB
11		Skjalg Kongssund	Norway	4:26.20	PB
12		Matthias Boonen	Belgium	4:41.50	
13		Jonathan Sum	Kenya	4:56.55	SB

== T46 ==
The final of this event was held at 19:00 on 16 July 2023.

Rank	Lane	Name	Nationality	Time	Notes
1st place, gold medalist(s)		Hristiyan Stoyanov	Bulgaria	3:52.56	SB
2nd place, silver medalist(s)		Michael Roeger	Australia	3:53.89	
3rd place, bronze medalist(s)		Bechir Agoubi	Tunisia	3:57.77	PB
4		Wesley Kimeli Sang	Kenya	3:59.34	PB
5		Luke Nuttall	Great Britain	3:59.50	
6		Pradeep Puwakpitikande	Sri Lanka	4:00.50	PB
7		Christian Olsen	Denmark	4:02.73	SB
8		Samir Nouioua	Algeria	4:04.40	
9		David Emong	Uganda	4:05.90	SB
10		Antoine Praud	France	4:13.27	
11		Manuel Jaime	Angola	4:16.19	SB
12		Muhamad Ashraf Haisham	Malaysia	4:18.56	SB
13		Efrain Sotacuro	Peru	4:21.85	SB
14		Carlos Ivan Sangama	Peru	4:25.53	SB

== T52 ==
The event took place on 9 July.

Rank	Lane	Name	Nationality	Time	Notes
1st place, gold medalist(s)	7	Tomoki Sato	Japan	3:36.22	CR
2nd place, silver medalist(s)	4	Thomas Geierspichler	Austria	4:03.53	SB
3rd place, bronze medalist(s)	3	Pichaya Kurattanasiri	Thailand	4:04.40	
4	2	Leonardo de Jesús Pérez Juárez	Mexico	4:06.89	
5	5	Kęstutis Skučas	Lithuania	4:09.87	
6	1	Cristian Torres	Colombia	4:14.34	
7	6	Brandon Beack	South Africa	4:47.34	

== T54 ==
The final of this event was held at 11:12 on 14 Jul 2023.

Rank	Lane	Name	Nationality	Time	Notes
1st place, gold medalist(s)		Marcel Hug	Switzerland	2:51.32	SB
2nd place, silver medalist(s)		Brent Lakatos	Canada	2:52.07	
3rd place, bronze medalist(s)		Prawat Wahoram	Thailand	2:52.18	PB
4		Putharet Khongrak	Thailand	2:52.38	PB
5		Saichon Konjen	Thailand	2:52.50	
6		Daniel Sidbury	Great Britain	2:53.02	PB
7		Nathan Maguire	Great Britain	2:53.16	SB
8		Julien Casoli	France	2:55.19	
9		Samuel Rizzo	Australia	2:55.32	SB
10		Ludwig Malter	Austria	3:03.05	
11		Manuel Jaime	Angola	4:16.19	SB
12		Muhamad Ashraf Haisham	Malaysia	4:18.56	SB
13		Efrain Sotacuro	Peru	4:21.85	SB
14		Carlos Ivan Sangama	Peru	4:25.53	SB
		Felix Kipruto	Kenya	DNS	
