= Athletics at the 2020 Summer Paralympics – Men's 1500 metres T38 =

Men's 1500 metres T38 at the XVI Paralympic Games
- Venue: Tokyo National Stadium
- Dates: 4 September 2021 (final)
- Competitors: 9 from 6 nations
- Winning time: 3:58.92

Medalists
1st place, gold medalist(s)		Nathan Riech	Canada
2nd place, silver medalist(s)		Abdelkrim Krai	Algeria
3rd place, bronze medalist(s)		Deon Kenzie	Australia

The men's 1500 metres T38 event at the 2020 Summer Paralympics in Tokyo took place on 4 September 2021.

The T38 category is for ambulant athletes with cerebral palsy. T38 athletes have the mildest form of impairment caused by cerebral palsy, often in only one limb, and not affecting the ability to run, walk or jump freely, although impairing performance. T38 athletes may suffer minor co-ordination difficulties.

== Records ==
Prior to the competition, the existing records were as follows:

World record	Nathan Riech (CAN)	3:47.89	Portland, United States	29 May 2021
Paralympic record	Abbes Saidi (TUN)	4:13.81	Rio de Janeiro, Brazil	10 September 2016

Area	Time	Athlete	Nation
Africa	4:04.70	Abdelkrim Krai	Algeria
America	3:47.89 WR	Nathan Riech	Canada
Asia	4:48.46	Apisit Taprom	Thailand
Europe	4:04.39	Redouane Hennouni-Bouzidi	France
Oceania	3:58.43	Deon Kenzie	Australia

== Results ==
The final took place on 4 September 2021, at 19:15:

Rank	Name	Nationality	Class	Time	Notes
1st place, gold medalist(s)	Nathan Riech	Canada	T38	3:58.92	GR
2nd place, silver medalist(s)	Abdelkrim Krai	Algeria	T38	4:03.07	AR
3rd place, bronze medalist(s)	Deon Kenzie	Australia	T38	4:03.76	
4	Redouane Hennouni-Bouzidi	France	T38	4:05.95	
5	Liam Stanley	Canada	T37	4:06.95	GR
6	Daniel Bounty	Australia	T38	4:12.95	
7	Louis Radius	France	T38	4:17.19	
8	Michael McKillop	Ireland	T37	4:27.69	
9	Carlos Alberto Castillo	Nicaragua	T38	4:54.91	SB
