= 2018 World Para Athletics European Championships – Men's 1500 metres =

The men's 1500 metres at the 2018 World Para Athletics European Championships was held at the Friedrich-Ludwig-Jahnsportpark in Berlin from 20 to 26 August. 6 events were held over this distance.

== Medalists ==
Event	Gold		Silver		Bronze	
T11	Aleksander Kossakowski (POL) guide : Kryzystof Wasilewski	4:22.45	Manuel Garnica (ESP) guide : Sisay Berhano	4:28.91	Avi Solomon (ISR) guide : Jose Oliviera	4:51.54
T13	Serhii Bereziuk (UKR)	4:05.21	David Devine (GBR)	4:05.57	Mehmet Nesım Öner (TUR)	4:08.56
T20	Cristiano Pereira (POR)	3:58.28	Pavlo Voluikevych (UKR)	3:58.46	Daniel Pek (POL)	3:59.62
T38	Rédouane Hennouni-Bouzidi (FRA)	4:13.12 CR	Louis Radius (FRA)	4:16.66	Felix Kreusemann (GER)	4:21.60
T46	Hristiyan Stoyanov (BUL)	4:06.38	Luke Nuttall (GBR)	4:22.28	Johannes Bessell (GER)	4:23.98
T52	Thomas Geierspichler (AUT)	4:28.12 CR	Kestutis Skucas (LTU)	4:31.51	Fabian Blum (SUI)	4:48.41
T54	Marcel Hug (SUI)	3:23.18	Julien Casoli (FRA)	3:23.83	Kenny van Weeghel (NED)	3:23.85
WR world record | AR area record | CR championship record | GR games record | NR national record | OR Olympic record | PB personal best | SB season best | WL world leading (in a given season)

== See also ==
- List of IPC world records in athletics
