= Athletics at the 2016 Summer Paralympics – Men's 1500 metres T38 =

Men's 1500 metres T38 at the XV Paralympic Games
- Venue: Estádio Olímpico João Havelange
- Dates: 10 September 2016
- Competitors: 8 from 8 nations

Medalists
1st place, gold medalist(s)		Abbes Saidi	Tunisia
2nd place, silver medalist(s)		Deon Kenzie	Australia
3rd place, bronze medalist(s)		Louis Radius	France

The T38 category is for ambulant athletes with cerebral palsy. T38 athletes have the mildest form of impairment caused by cerebral palsy, often in only one limb, and not affecting the ability to run, walk or jump freely, although impairing performance. T38 athletes may suffer minor co-ordination difficulties.

The Athletics at the 2016 Summer Paralympics – Men's 1500 metres T38 event at the 2016 Paralympic Games took place on 10 September 2016, at the Estádio Olímpico João Havelange.

== Final ==
19:19 10 September 2016:

Rank	Lane	Bib	Name	Nationality	Reaction	Time	Notes
1st place, gold medalist(s)	2	2279	Abbes Saidi	Tunisia		4:13.81	
2nd place, silver medalist(s)	5	1055	Deon Kenzie	Australia		4:14.95	
3rd place, bronze medalist(s)	7	1475	Louis Radius	France		4:17.19	
4	6	1204	Mitchell Chase	Canada		4:28.44	
5	1	1381	Christoffer Vienberg	Denmark		4:31.68	
6	4	1368	Daniel Hyna	Czech Republic		4:42.33	
7	8	1102	Basile Meunier	Belgium		4:54.77	
	3	1873	Angel Moises Enriquez Torres	Mexico			DSQ
