= 2017 World Para Athletics Championships – Men's 1500 metres =

The men's 1500 metres at the 2017 World Para Athletics Championships was held at the Olympic Stadium in London from 14 to 23 July.

== Medalists ==
Event	Gold		Silver		Bronze	
T11	Samwel Mushai Kimani; Guide: James Boit; Kenya	4:11.54	Jason Joseph Dunkerley; Guide: Jeremie Nathaniel Venne; Canada	4:13.67 SB	Aleksander Kossakowski; Guide: Sylwester Lepiarz; Poland	4:14.21
T13	Abdellatif Baka; Algeria	3:52.82 CR	Fouad Baka; Algeria	3:53.07 SB	Jaryd Clifford; Australia	3:53.31 AR
T20	Michael Brannigan; United States	3:53.05 CR	Cristiano Pereira; Portugal	3:55.39 AR	Rafal Korc; Poland	3:56.82
T37	Michael McKillop; Ireland	4:36.38	Liam Stanley; Canada	4:37.96	Madjid Djemai; Algeria	4:41.93
T38	Deon Kenzie; Australia	4:06.68 CR	Louis Radius; France	4:12.25 SB	Abbes Saidi; Tunisia	4:12.37
T46	David Emong; Uganda	3:58.36 PB	Samir Nouioua; Algeria	3:58.78	Hristiyan Stoyanov; Bulgaria	3:58.94 PB
T52	Tomoki Sato; Japan	3:45.89 CR	Martin Raymond; United States	3:47.04	Hirokazu Ueyonabaru; Japan	4:01.56
T54	Marcel Hug; Switzerland	3:04.33	Yassine Gharbi; Tunisia	3:04.58	Alhassane Baldé; Germany	3:04.61
WR world record | AR area record | CR championship record | GR games record | NR national record | OR Olympic record | PB personal best | SB season best | WL world leading (in a given season)

Events listed in pink were contested but no medals were awarded.

== See also ==
- List of IPC world records in athletics
