= Angus Hincksman =

Australian Paralympic athlete (born 2005)

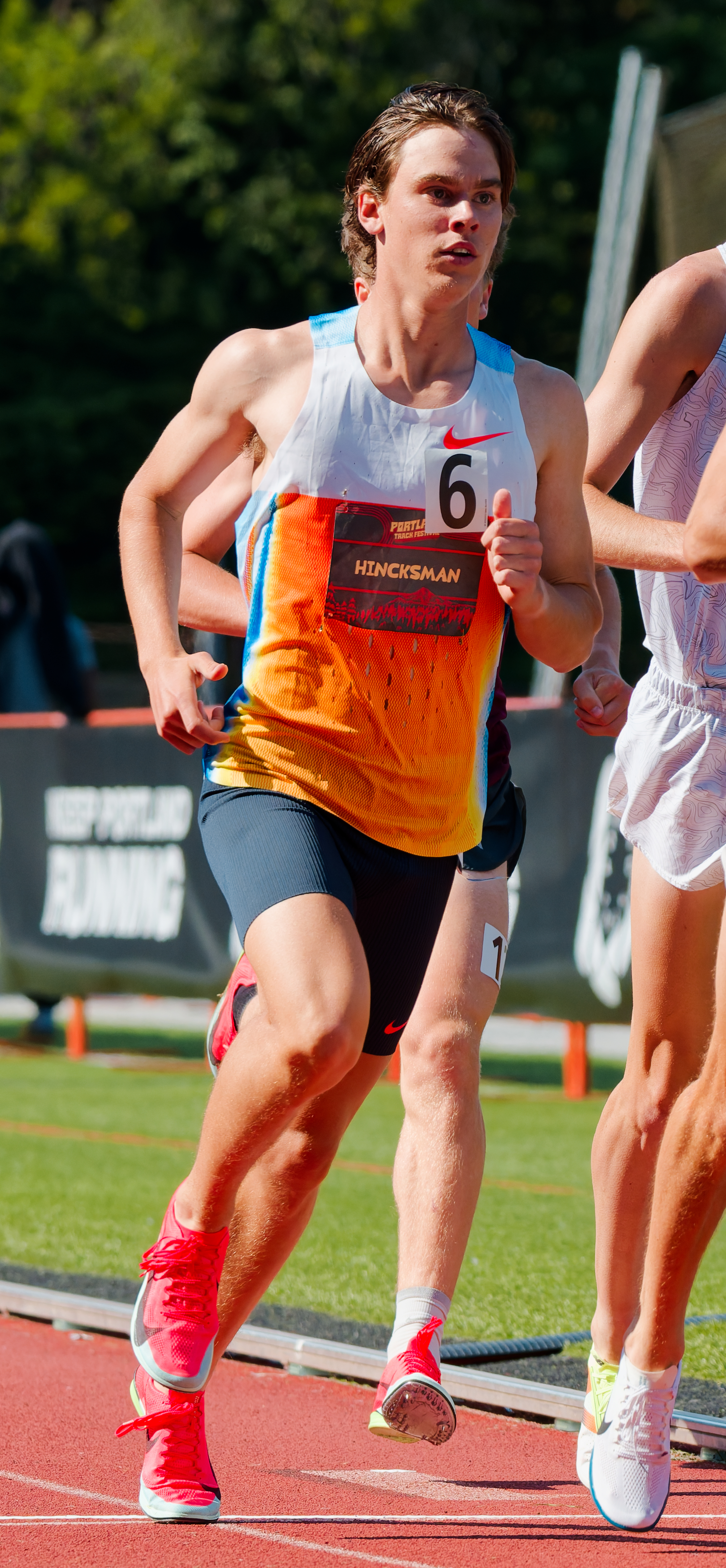
- Hincksman in 2025

Personal information
- Nationality: Australia
- Born: 31 July 2005 (age 21)

Sport
- Club: Southern Athletics Club
- Coached by: Philo Saunders
Medal record
Men's para-athletics
Representing Australia
World Championships
Bronze medal – third place	2023 Paris	1500m T38
Bronze medal – third place	2025 New Delhi	1500m T38

Angus Hincksman (born 31 July 2005) is an Australian track and field middle distance Paralympian from South Australia. He represents Southern Athletics Club locally and competes in T38 classification events internationally. He won two bronze medals at the World Para Athletics Championships. Hincksman competed at the 2024 Summer Paralympics, Paris, France - his first Games.

== Personal ==
He was born 31 July 2005. He was diagnosed with a brain injury while in the Woman and Children's Hospital NICU. With the support of Child Development Unit and NOVITA children’s services Angus progressed well attending Tatachilla Lutheran College until year 9 then moved to Westminster School under a scholarship

== Sporting career ==
He took up cross-country running at the age of nine. Before his teenage years, he was classified as T38 athlete with cerebral palsy. In 2022, at the Australian Athletics Championships he defeated Paralympians Deon Kenzie and Daniel Bounty in coming second to Reece Langdon in Men's 1500 m T38. At the 2023 Australian Athletics Championships, he finished second to Langdon in the 1500 m T38, but won gold in the 800 m T38 in 1:57.33 setting the men’s U20 T38 800 m World Record

At the 2023 World Para Athletics Championships in Paris, he won the bronze medal in the Men's 1500 m T38 and finished eight in the Men's 400 m T38.

In 2023, he was awarded Tier 2 Scholarship within the Sport Australia Hall of Fame Scholarship and Mentoring Program.

At the 2024 Paris Paralympics, he finished fourth in the Men's 1500 m T38 in 4:14.14. At the 2025 World Para Athletics Championships in New Delhi, he won the bronze medal in Men's 1500 m T38 in 3:58.19.

In 2024 he was supported through a South Australian Sports Institute scholarship, coached by Simon Moran. More recently moving under Philo Saunders but maintaining a strong relationship with Simon.
