= Athletics at the 2023 Parapan American Games – Men's 1500 metres T38 =

Men's 1500 metres T38 at the 2023 Parapan American Games
- Venue: Mario Recordón Athletics Training Center
- Dates: November 21
- Competitors: 4 from 4 nations
- Winning time: 4:12.62

Medalists
1st place, gold medalist(s)		Leo Merle	United States
2nd place, silver medalist(s)		Liam Stanley	Canada
3rd place, bronze medalist(s)		Jhonier Gómez	Colombia

The men's T38 1500 metres competition of the athletics events at the 2023 Parapan American Games was held on November 21 at the Mario Recordón Athletics Training Center within the Julio Martínez National Stadium of Santiago, Chile.

== Records ==
Prior to this competition, the existing world and Pan American Games records were as follows:

World record	Nate Reich (CAN)	3:47.89	Portland, United States	May 29, 2021
Parapan American Games record	Nate Reich (CAN)	4:03.72	Lima, Peru	August 24, 2019

== Schedule ==
Date	Time	Round
November 21, 2023	17:40	Final

== Results ==
All times shown are in seconds.

KEY:	q	Fastest non-qualifiers	Q	Qualified	PR	Parapan Games record	NR	National record	SB	Seasonal best	DQ	Disqualified

=== Final ===
The results were as follows:

Rank	Lane	Name	Nationality	Time	Notes
1st place, gold medalist(s)	2	Leo Merle	United States	4:12.62	
2nd place, silver medalist(s)	1	Liam Stanley	Canada	4:13.60	
3rd place, bronze medalist(s)	3	Jhonier Gómez	Colombia	4:26.15	SB
4	4	Carlos Castillo	Nicaragua	4:57.50	
