= 2024 World Para Athletics Championships – Men's 1500 metres =

The men's 1500 metres at the 2024 World Para Athletics Championships were held in Kobe.

== Medalists ==
Event	Gold	Silver	Bronze
T11	Júlio Cesar Agripino; Brazil	Yitayal Yigzaw; Ethiopia	Fedor Rudakov; Neutral Paralympic Athletes (NPA)
T13	Anton Kuliatin; Neutral Paralympic Athletes (NPA)	Rouay Jebabli; Tunisia	Abdellatif Baka; Algeria
T20	Michael Brannigan; United States	Sandro Baessa; Portugal	Yuji Togawa; Japan
T38	Amen Allah Tissaoui; Tunisia	Abdelkrim Krai; Algeria	Deon Kenzie; Australia
T46	Aleksandr Iaremchuk; Neutral Paralympic Athletes (NPA)	Hristiyan Stoyanov; Bulgaria	Michael Roeger; Australia
T52	Maxime Carabin; Belgium	Tomoki Sato; Japan	Leonardo de Jesús Pérez Juárez; Mexico
T54	Jin Hua; China	Dai Yunqiang; China	Saichon Konjen; Thailand
