= Athletics at the 2024 Summer Paralympics – Men's 1500 metres T20 =

Men's 1500 metres T20 at the XVII Paralympic Games
- Venue: Stade de France, Paris, France
- Dates: 6 September 2024
- Competitors: 7 from 6 nations
- Winning time: 3:45.40 WR

Medalists
1st place, gold medalist(s)		Ben Sandilands	Great Britain
2nd place, silver medalist(s)		Sandro Baessa	Portugal
3rd place, bronze medalist(s)		Michael Brannigan	United States

1500 metres at the 2024 Summer Paralympics
Men's · T11 · T13 · T20 · T38 · T46 · T54 · Women's · T11 · T13 · T20 · T54

The Men's 1500 metres T20 at the 2024 Summer Paralympics took place on 6 September 2024 at the Stade de France in Paris.

== Records ==
Records before the event are as follows:

World Record	Michael Brannigan (USA)	3:45.50	(United States) New York	11 February 2017
Paralympic Record	Michael Brannigan (USA)	3:51.73	(Brazil) Rio de Janeiro	13 September 2016

Area	Time	Athlete	Location	Date
Africa				
America				
Asia				
Europe				
Oceania				

== Classification ==
The event is for athletes with an intellectual impairment.

== Results ==
=== Final ===
The final was held on 6 September 2024

Rank	Athlete	Nation	Time	Notes
1st place, gold medalist(s)	Ben Sandilands	Great Britain	3:45.40	WR
2nd place, silver medalist(s)	Sandro Baessa	Portugal	3:49.46	PB
3rd place, bronze medalist(s)	Michael Brannigan	United States	3:49.91	
4	Ndiaga Dieng	Italy	3:50.24	
5	Daiki Akai	Japan	3:57.58	
6	Yuji Togawa	Japan	4:02.68	
7	Aaron Shorten	Ireland	4:02.71	SB
