= Daniel Bounty =

Australian Paralympic athlete

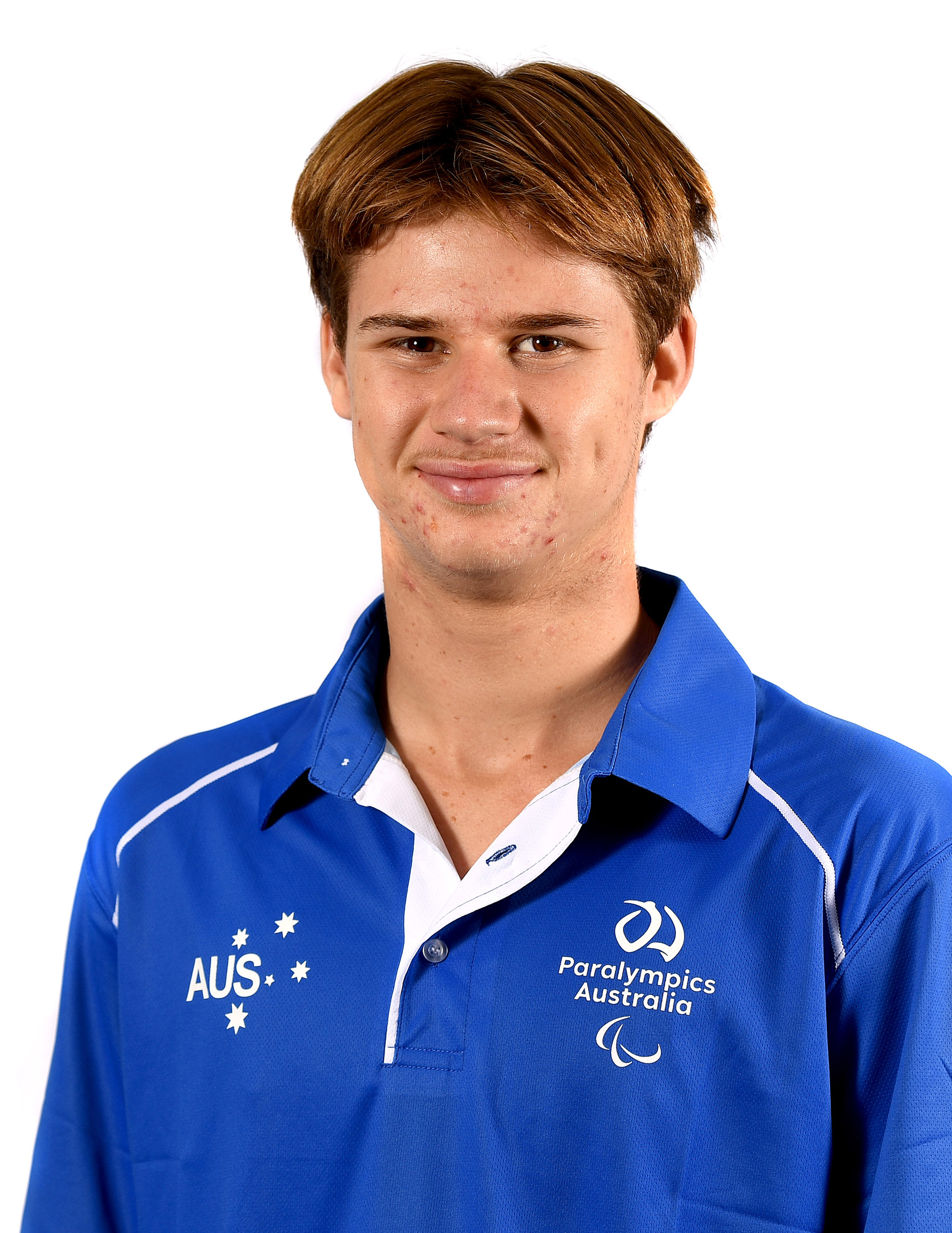
- Daniel Bounty in 2019

Personal information
- Nationality: Australian
- Born: 2 September 2001 (age 25)

Sport
- Disability class: T38
- Coached by: Peter Bock

Daniel Bounty (born 2 September 2001) is an Australian Paralympic athlete. He represented Australia at the 2020 Summer Paralympics.

== Early life ==
Daniel Bounty was born on 2 September 2001. At age eight he had a stroke after he was involved in a bodysurfing accident. The accident led to a slow bleed in his brain which clotted. He attended Pacific Lutheran College and Caloundra State High School.

== Athletics career ==
Bounty is classified as T38. At the 2017 World Junior Para-Athletics Championships in Dubai, he finished fourth in the Men's 800m U18 T35-38. In June 2021, he shaved over 3.5 seconds off his personal best in running 4:10.08 in the 1500m.

At the 2020 Summer Paralympics, he finished sixth in the Men's 1500 m T38.

In 2021, he is coached by Peter Bock.
