= Reece Langdon =

Australian Paralympic athlete (born 1996)

Personal information
- Nationality: Australia
- Born: 22 February 1996 (age 30)
- Height: 1.74 m (5 ft 9 in)
- Weight: 62 kg (137 lb)

Sport
- Club: Sandringham Athletic Club
Medal record
Men's para-athletics
Representing Australia
Paralympic Games
Bronze medal – third place	2024 Paris	1500 m T38
World Championships
Silver medal – second place	2023 Paris	1500m T38

Reece Langdon (born 22 February 1996) is an Australian track and field para-athlete who competes in the T38 classification events. He won a silver medal at the 2023 World Para Athletics Championships and a bronze medal at the 2024 Summer Paralympics, Paris, France.

== Personal ==
He was born 22 February 1996. At the age of six, he had a severe streptococcal infection which led to being diagnosed with cerebellitis. This resulted in permanent ataxia, coordination impairment, temperature regulation issues and general weakness on the left side of his body. Melbourne.

== Sporting career ==
In his early life, he lived on a farm near Goulburn, New South Wales and this led him to running to a letter box about 2 km from the farm. He kept up his running as part of his soccer training. Langdon moved to Canberra in year ten and commenced training with Matt Beckenham for 200m and 400m. In 2016, he transferred to Dick Telford's distance running training group. He was classified as a T38 athlete in February 2022. In May 2022, he moved to Melbourne to be coached by Tim O’Shaughessy and was awarded a Victorian Institute of Sport scholarship.

At the 2023 Australian Athletics Championships, he won the Men's 1500m T38 defeating Angus Hincksman and Deon Kenzie. Langdon won the silver medal in the Men's 1500m T38 at the 2023 World Para Athletics Championships in Paris.

Langdon won the bronze medal in the Men's 1500 m T38 at the 2024 Paris Paralympics. At the 2025 World Para Athletics Championships in New Delhi, he finished fourth in Men's 1500m T38 in 3:59.81.
