= Amen Allah Tissaoui =

Tunisian Paralympic athlete (born 2004)

Personal information
- Nationality: Tunisian
- Born: 9 November 2004 (age 21) Jendouba, Tunisia

Sport
- Sport: Para-athletics
- Disability class: F37
- Event: Middle-distance running
Medal record
Men's para-athletics
Representing Tunisia
Paralympic Games
Gold medal – first place	2024 Paris	1500 m T38
Bronze medal – third place	2024 Paris	400 m T37
World Championships
Gold medal – first place	2024 Kobe	1500 m T38
Silver medal – second place	2025 New Delhi	1500 m T38
Bronze medal – third place	2024 Kobe	400 m T37

Amen Allah Tissaoui (born 9 November 2004) is a Tunisian para-athlete who specializes in middle-distance running. He represented Tunisia at the 2024 Summer Paralympics.

== Career ==
In May 2024, Tissaoui competed at the 2024 World Para Athletics Championships and won a gold medal in the 1500 metres T38 and a bronze medal in the 400 metres T37 events. He then represented Tunisia at the 2024 Summer Paralympics and won a bronze medal in the 1500 metres T37 event.
