= Sandro Baessa =

Portuguese Paralympic athlete (born 1999)

- Baessa at the 2024 Summer Paralympics in Paris

Personal information
- Full name: Sandro Patricio Correia Baessa
- Nationality: Portuguese
- Born: 29 March 1999 (age 27)

Sport
- Country: Portugal
- Sport: Para-athletics
- Disability class: T20
- Event: 1500 metres
Medal record
Men's para-athletics
Representing Portugal
Paralympic Games
Silver medal – second place	2024 Paris	1500 m T20
World Championships
Silver medal – second place	2019 Dubai	1500 m T20
Silver medal – second place	2024 Kobe	1500 m T20
Bronze medal – third place	2023 Paris	1500 m T20
Bronze medal – third place	2025 New Delhi	1500 m T20

Sandro Patricio Correia Baessa (born 29 March 1999) is a Portuguese T20 Paralympic middle distance runner.

== Career ==
In May 2024, he competed at the 2024 World Para Athletics Championships and won a silver medal in the 1500 metres T20 event. A few months later, he repeated the result in the 1500 metres T20 event at the 2024 Summer Paralympics in Paris.
