= Rédouane Hennouni-Bouzidi =

French Paralympic athlete (born 1989)

Personal information
- Born: 16 January 1989 (age 37) Amiens, France

Sport
- Country: France
- Sport: Paralympic athletics
- Disability class: T38
- Event: 1500 metres
Medal record
Paralympic athletics
Representing France
European Championships
Gold medal – first place	2018 Berlin	1500m T38
Gold medal – first place	2020 Bydgoszcz	1500m T38

Rédouane Hennouni-Bouzidi (born 16 January 1989) is a French Paralympic athlete who competes at international elite track and field competitions. He competes in middle-distance running and cross-country running events, he was a former steeplechase runner. He is a double European champion and has competed at the 2020 Summer Paralympics where he finished fourth in the men's 1500m T38.

== Impairment ==
Hennouni-Bouzidi was practicing figure skating in a training session, he tried doing a Salchow jump and lost balance and struck his head on another skater's skate. He was hospitalised and underwent brain surgery to remove a blood clot which resulted in paralysis on his right side.
