= Leo Merle =

American Paralympic athlete

Personal information
- Full name: Leo Merle VI
- Born: January 14, 1998 (age 28)
- Home town: Folsom, California, U.S.
- Education: University of California, Santa Cruz; University of Michigan

Sport
- Sport: Paralympic athletics
- Disability: Cerebral palsy
- Disability class: T38
- Event: Middle-distance running
Medal record
Track and field
Representing the United States
Parapan American Games
Gold medal – first place	2023 Santiago	1500 m T38

Leo Merle VI (born January 14, 1998) is an American Paralympic middle-distance runner. He represented the United States at the 2024 Summer Paralympics.

== Early life and education ==
Merle was born with cerebral palsy that affects the flexibility in his right foot and leg. He wore a corrective boot to stretch the tendons of his right leg so they would develop properly and maintain their flexibility until he was six years old. He attended Vista Del Lago High School where he ran cross country and track and field. He attended University of California, Santa Cruz and earned a Bachelor of Science in molecular, cellular and developmental biology. He then attended the University of Michigan School of Dentistry and earned a doctorate of dental surgery.

== Career ==
Merle began his career in long-distance running, participating in the 5000 metres and 10,000 metres events. After learning that his T38 classification maxed out at 1500 metres, he transitioned to middle-distance running.

He made his international debut for the United States at the 2023 World Para Athletics Championships in the 1500 metres T38 event, and finished in fourth place with a personal best time of 4:06.13. In November 2023, he then competed at the 2023 Parapan American Games and won a gold medal in the 1500 metres T38 event with a time of 4:12.62.

In May 2024, he represented the United States at the 2024 World Para Athletics Championships in the 1500 metres T38 event, and finished in fourth place with a time of 4:07.47. In July 2024, during the U.S. Paralympic team trials, he qualified to represent the United States at the 2024 Summer Paralympics.

== Personal life ==
Following the Paralympics, Merle said he planned to become a dental professional specializing in endodontics and root canal.
