= Nathan Riech =

Canadian Paralympic athlete

Nate Riech Nate Tucker
Personal information
- Full name: Nathan Riech; Nathan Tucker
- Nicknames: Dogg, GrayWolf
- Nationality: Canadian
- Born: February 5, 1995 (age 31) Fresno, California, U.S.
- Home town: Victoria, British Columbia, Canada
- Height: 6 ft 1 in (185 cm)

Sport
- Country: Canada
- Sport: Para athletics
- Disability class: T38
- Event: 1500 metres
- Club: Vic City Elite
- Coached by: Heather Hennigar; Mike Van Tighem
Medal record
Men's para-athletics
Representing Canada
Paralympic Games
Gold medal – first place	2020 Tokyo	1500m T38
Silver medal – second place	2024 Paris	1500 m T38
World Championships
Gold medal – first place	2019 Dubai	1500m T38
Gold medal – first place	2023 Paris	1500m T38
Gold medal – first place	2025 New Delhi	1500m T38
Parapan American Games
Gold medal – first place	2019 Lima	1500m T38

Nathan Riech (born February 5, 1995), also known as Nathan Tucker, is a Canadian Paralympic athlete who competes in middle-distance running events in international level events. He has a dual citizenship with Canada and the United States.

== Personal life ==
Riech was born in a sporting family: his father Todd Riech competed for United States at the 1996 Summer Olympics in the men's javelin throw, his mother Ardin Tucker was a Canadian pole vaulter who competed in the 2002 Commonwealth Games. His grandfather, Jim Harrison, played in the National Hockey League with the Toronto Maple Leafs, Chicago Blackhawks and Boston Bruins. Riech's cousin Georganne Moline competed in the 400 metre hurdles in the 2012 Summer Olympics and 2016 Summer Olympics while his stepmother Brittany Borman also competed in the same Olympics in the women's javelin throw.

Riech's disability occurred after a freak accident aged ten while he was playing golf with friends, a golf ball hit Riech in the back of the head which caused him to have a brain injury which affected the right side of his body.

== Sporting career ==
Riech began running at ten years old in Chandler, Arizona. He went on to run NCAA track at Furman University and University of South Alabama. He began competing internationally in 2018 in the World Para Athletics Grand Prix in Berlin where he broke the 800 metres and 1500 metres T38 world records, one year later, he broke then 1500 metre world record again. He won his first medal in the 2019 Parapan American Games in Lima.
