= Abdelkrim Krai =

Algerian Paralympic athlete (born 1997)

Personal information
- Nationality: Algerian
- Born: 27 February 1997 (age 29) Bordj Bou Arréridj, Algeria

Sport
- Sport: Paralympic athletics
- Disability class: T38
- Event: 1500 metres
- Club: CA Bordj Bou Arreridj
Medal record
Men's Para-athletics
Representing Algeria
Paralympic Games
Silver medal – second place	2020 Tokyo	1500 m T38
World Championships
Silver medal – second place	2019 Dubai	1500 m T38
Silver medal – second place	2024 Kobe	1500 m T38

Abdelkrim Krai (born 27 February 1997) is an Algerian Paralympic athlete who specializes in middle-distance running.

== Career ==
Krai represented Algeria at the 2020 Summer Paralympics in the 1500 metres T38 event and own a silver medal.
