= Hristiyan Stoyanov =

Bulgarian Paralympic athlete

Personal information
- Nationality: Bulgarian
- Born: 20 August 1998 (age 27) Gabrovo, Bulgaria

Sport
- Sport: Para-athletics
- Disability class: T46
- Event: Middle-distance running
- Club: Dunav Ruse
- Coached by: Evgeni Ignatov
Medal record
Para-athletics
Representing Bulgaria
Paralympic Games
Silver medal – second place	2020 Tokyo	1500 m T46
World Championships
Gold medal – first place	2019 Dubai	1500 m T46
Gold medal – first place	2023 Paris	1500 m T46
Silver medal – second place	2024 Kobe	1500 m T46
Bronze medal – third place	2017 London	1500 m T46
European Championships
Gold medal – first place	2018 Berlin	1500 m T46
Silver medal – second place	2016 Grosseto	1500 m T46
Silver medal – second place	2021 Bydgoszcz	1500 m T46

Hristiyan Stoyanov (born 20 August 1998) is a Bulgarian para-athlete who competes in middle-distance running. He represented Bulgaria in the Paralympic Games.

== Career ==
Stoyanov represented Bulgaria at the 2020 Summer Paralympics in the men's 1500 metres T46 event and won a silver medal.
