= Michael Roeger =

Australian Paralympic athlete (born 1988)

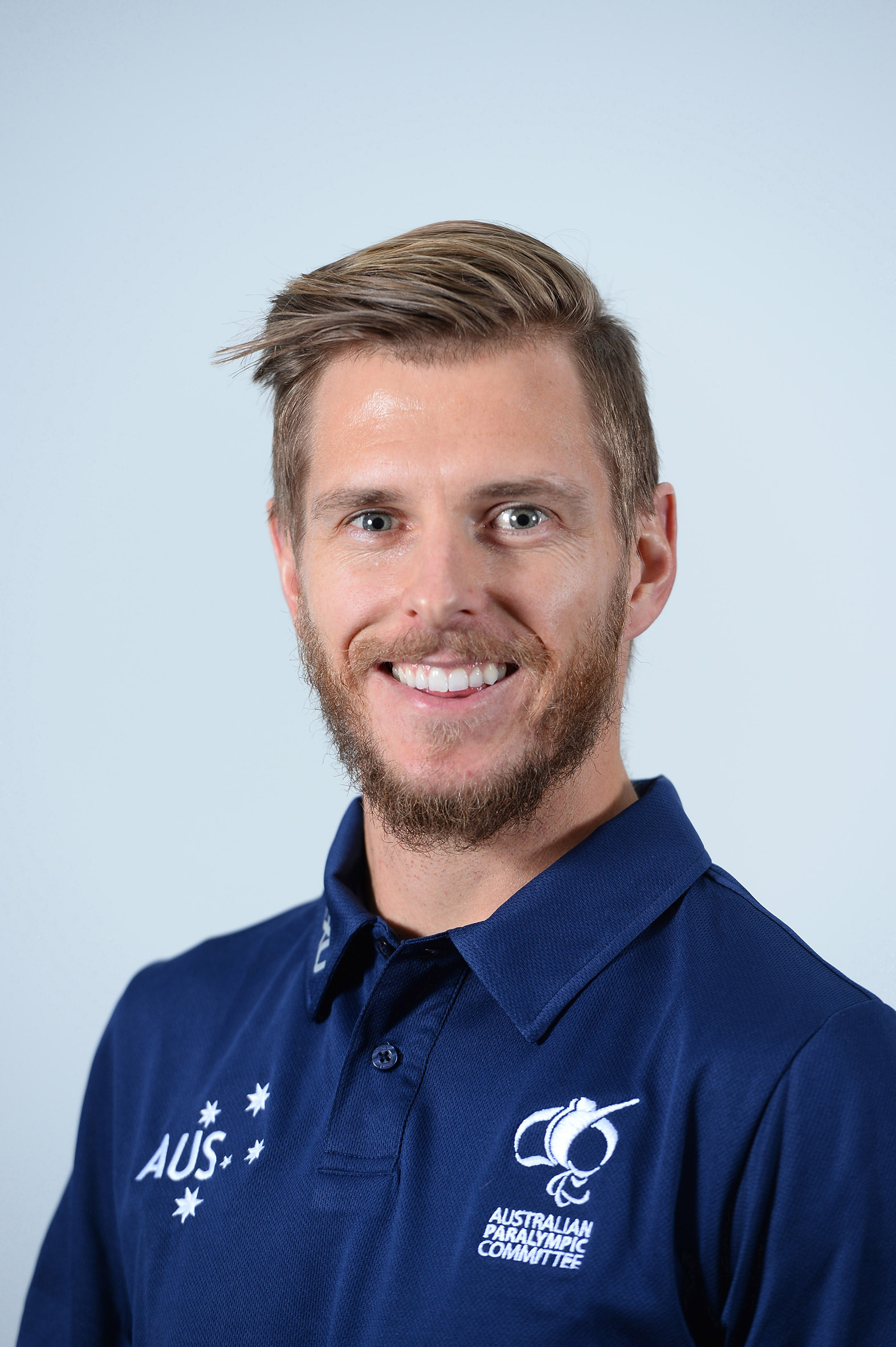
- 2016 Australian Paralympic team portrait of Roeger

Personal information
- Nationality: Australian
- Born: 14 May 1988 (age 38) Adelaide, South Australia
- Height: 1.78 m (5 ft 10 in)
- Weight: 61 kg (134 lb)

Sport
- Country: Australia
- Sport: Paralympic athletics
Medal record
Para-athletics
Paralympic Games
Silver medal – second place	2024 Paris	1500m – T46
Bronze medal – third place	2016 Rio de Janeiro	1500m – T46
World Championships
Gold medal – first place	2019 London	Marathon – T46
Silver medal – second place	2019 Dubai	1500m – T46
Silver medal – second place	2023 Paris	1500m – T46
Bronze medal – third place	2013 Lyon	1500m – T46
Bronze medal – third place	2013 Lyon	5000m – T46
Bronze medal – third place	2015 Doha	1500m – T46
Bronze medal – third place	2024 Kobe	1500m – T46

Michael Roeger (born 14 May 1988) is an Australian T46 athletics competitor. He competed at the 2008, 2012, 2016, 2020 and 2024 Summer Paralympics in athletics in middle distance and marathon running events. He has won one gold, one silver and four bronze medals at the World Para Athletics Championships and a silver and bronze medal at the Paralympics. His gold in the Men's T46 marathon at the 2019 World Para Athletics Championships was held as part of the London Marathon, set a new world record.

In 2024, he is the holds the world record in the Men's 1500m T46 with a time of 3:36.51 set in 2017.

== Personal ==
Roeger was born on 14 May 1988, and is from Langhorne Creek , South Australia. He has a twin brother Chris. He is missing the lower half of his right arm. He played junior football at the Langhorne Creek Football Club. Growing up, he played basketball, table tennis and cricket. He moved away from there and to Canberra in 2009. In 2012, he was a student at the University of Canberra working on a Bachelor of Communications in Advertising and Marketing.

== Athletics ==
Roeger is a T46 classified athlete, competing in 800 metres,1,500 metres and 5,000 metre events. He is a member of the Adelaide area Hills District Athletic Club. In 2008, when in Adelaide, he trained with Pete Davis and Marc Fairhead. He has held an athletics scholarship with the Australian Institute of Sport. He started competing in athletics in 1999 when he competed for his high school's cross country team.

At the 2008 Victorian Country Championships, Roeger set a Paralympic A qualifying time of 4:02.04 in the 1500 metres. At the time, this was the second best time ever set in the world. He also set qualifying times in the 800 metres and 5,000 metres. As a twenty-year-old, he represented Australia at the 2008 Summer Paralympics. He did not earn a medal at the Games. He set a personal best time in the 1,500 metre event, finishing in eighth place, and came 11th place in the final of the 5,000 metres. He did not make the finals in the 800 metre event. He was selected to represent Australia at the 2012 Summer Paralympics in athletics in the 800 metres event. His Paralympic training included five gym sessions a week with a focus on leg strength. He competed in the Men's 800 m T46 at the 2012 London and but did not medal.

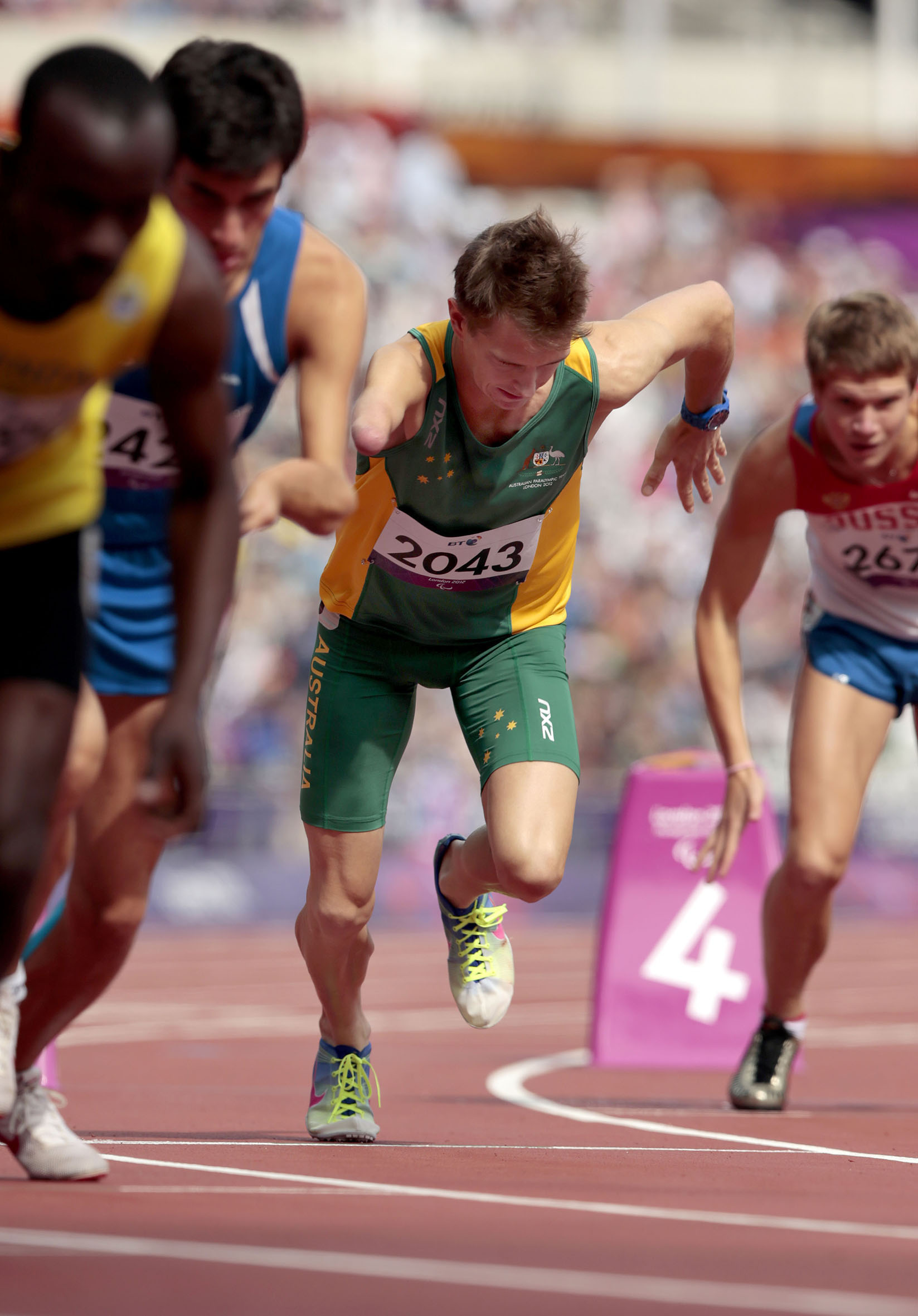
Roeger at the 2012 London Paralympics

At the 2013 IPC Athletics World Championships in Lyon, France, he won bronze medals in the Men's 1500m and Men's 5000m T46 events.

In 2014, Roeger ran almost a five-second 1500 m personal best (3 minutes 51.08 seconds) on 20 March 2014 at the Victorian Milers Club. His time qualified him for the 2014 Australian Athletics Championships. His time was just short of the world record, 3:50.2 and the second best time in his class. At the Australian Championships, he took on his coach Philo Saunders, who is a physiologist at the Australian Institute of Sport. Also in 2014, he was part of the Australian Sports Commission team that represented Australia at the JP Morgan Chase Corporate Challenge in London, England.

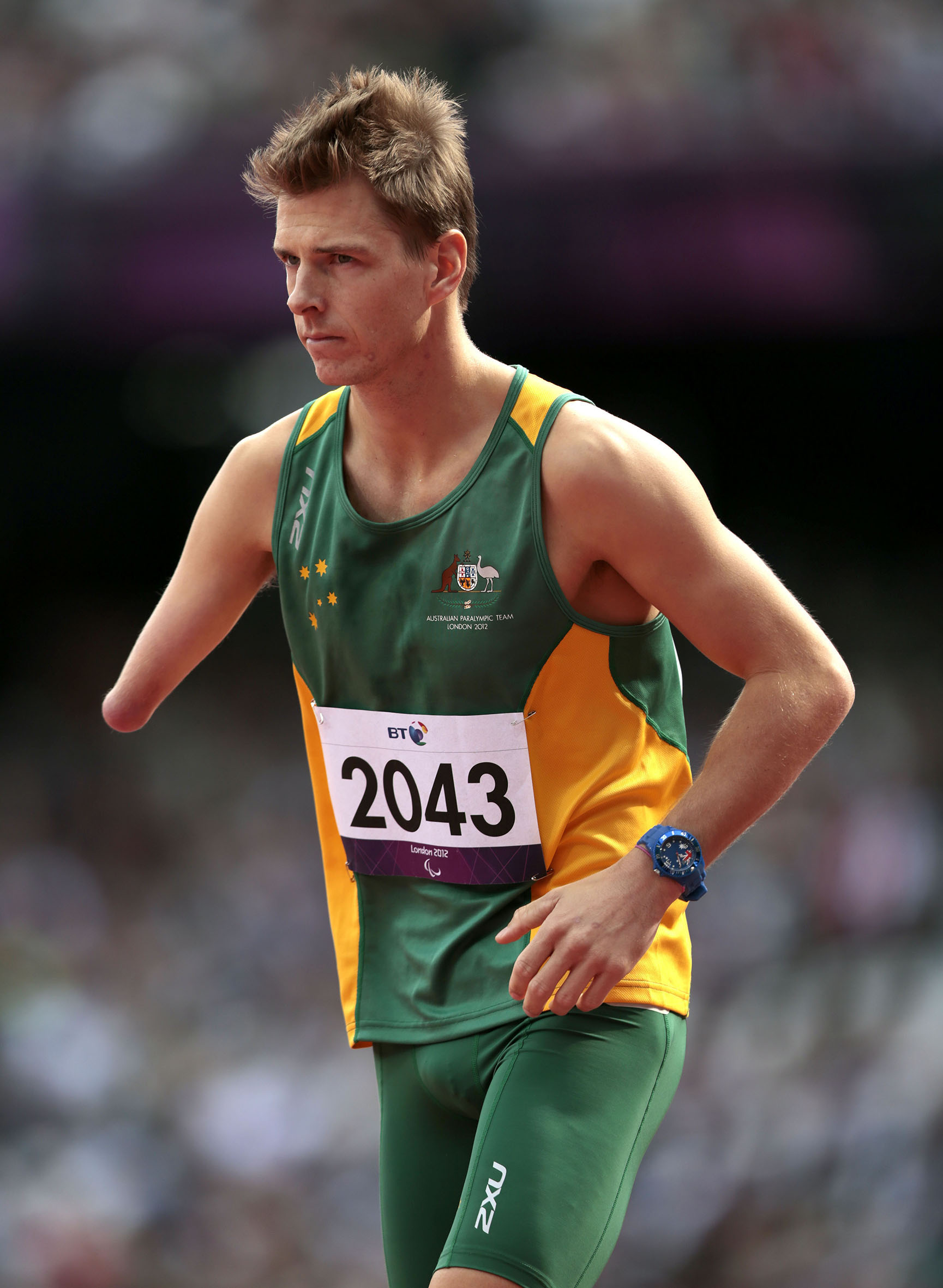
Roeger at the 2012 London Paralympics

During the Athletics Australia 2014/15 season, he reduced his personal best for the 1500m to 3:50.61. He qualified for the Australian Athletics Championships in Brisbane, Queensland Open 1500m and ran in the heats.

In June 2015 in Boston, United States, Roeger ran 3:48.55 to break the Men's 1500 m T46 world record but it was not ratified as no drug test was available.

At the 2015 IPC Athletics World Championships in Doha, he won the bronze medal in the Men's 1500 m T46. After the event, Roeger said "A bronze medal is a bronze medal, I wanted more from myself today but the legs weren't there in the last lap. It's a stepping stone for Rio. This makes me so hungry for gold. It's my dream and it's been my dream for a long time. It's about taking the positives away from this and building on them for next year".

On 12 June 2016, Roeger ran 3:49.08 in the Men's 1500m at the Portland Track Festival to break the Men's 1500m T46 world record. The record was not ratified even though drug testing was undertaken.

At the 2016 Rio Paralympics, he won the bronze medal in the Men's 1500 m T46.

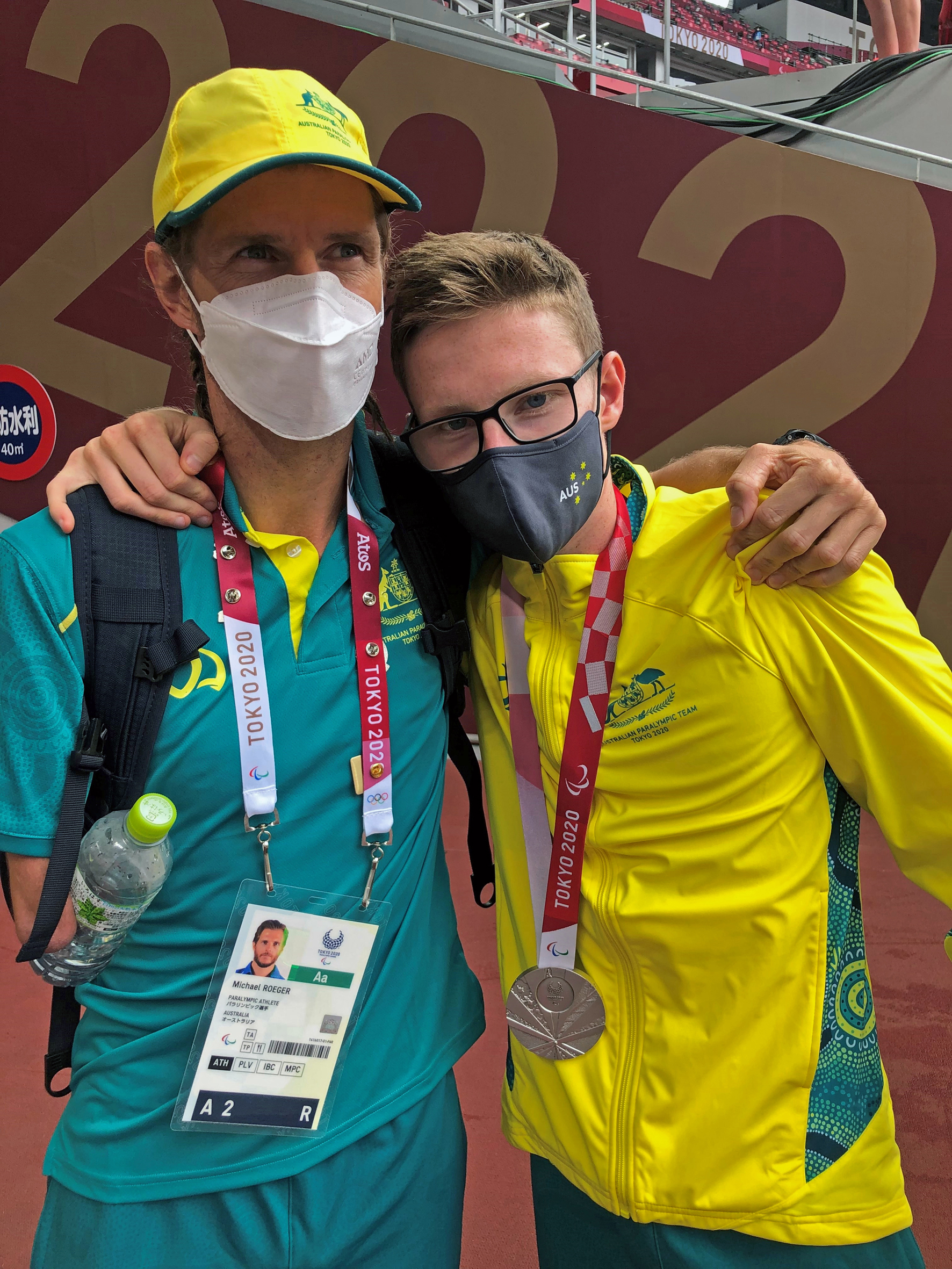
Australian athletes Michael Roeger (left) and Jaryd Clifford after the medal presentations for the marathon at the Tokyo 2020 Paralympics.

On 4 February 2017 at the inaugural Sydney Invitational, Roeger smashed the T46 1500m world record of 3:50.15 by running 3:46.51. Roeger had previously beaten the world record time but previous times were in unsanctioned events.

Roeger was selected to compete at the 2017 World Para Athletics Championships in London, England but withdrew just prior to the competition due to injury.

On 14 October 2018, in his debut marathon, he finished sixth in the Melbourne Marathon. His time 2:23.31 broke the previous world record of 2:26.44 but it was not ratified. After the race Roeger said "I’m over the moon to get the world record and finish on the MCG. It has been 10 years of work really, it is the third world record in the year, it is a pretty special feeling."

At the 2019 London Marathon which was also the 2019 World Para Athletics Championships marathon event, he won the Men's T46 in world record time of 2:22:51 breaking the ratified world record of 2:26.44. After originally being disqualified, he was awarded the silver medal in the Men's 1500 m at the 2019 World Para Athletics Championships in Dubai. His time was 3m:51.99.

Roeger finished 6th in the Men's Marathon T46 at the 2020 Tokyo Paralympics, his fourth Paralympics. Roeger went into the event as favourite but a stress fracture in his leg in the month leading up to the Games led to a compromised, preparation and training load coming into Tokyo.

At the 2020 Tokyo Paralympics, Roeger competed in the Marathon T46 where he finished sixth.

Roeger was forced to switch back to the 1500m after the marathon was omitted from the 2024 Paris Paralympics program. In returning to the 1500m, on 24 June 2023 he set a world best time of 3:44.83 at a track meet in Portland, Oregon. The time that beat his current world record will not be ratified as the meet was not sanctioned. At the 2023 World Para Athletics Championships, he won the silver medal in the Men's 1500m T46 in a time of 3:53.89.

In the lead up to the 2024 Tokyo Paralympics in Paris, Roeger won the bronze medal at in the Men's 1500m T46 at the 2024 World Para Athletics Championships in Kobe. His time was 3:50.45. At the 2024 Paris Paralympics, he moved to the 1500m T46 as the marathon was not on the program. He won the silver medal in a time of 3:51.19 after leading most of the race.

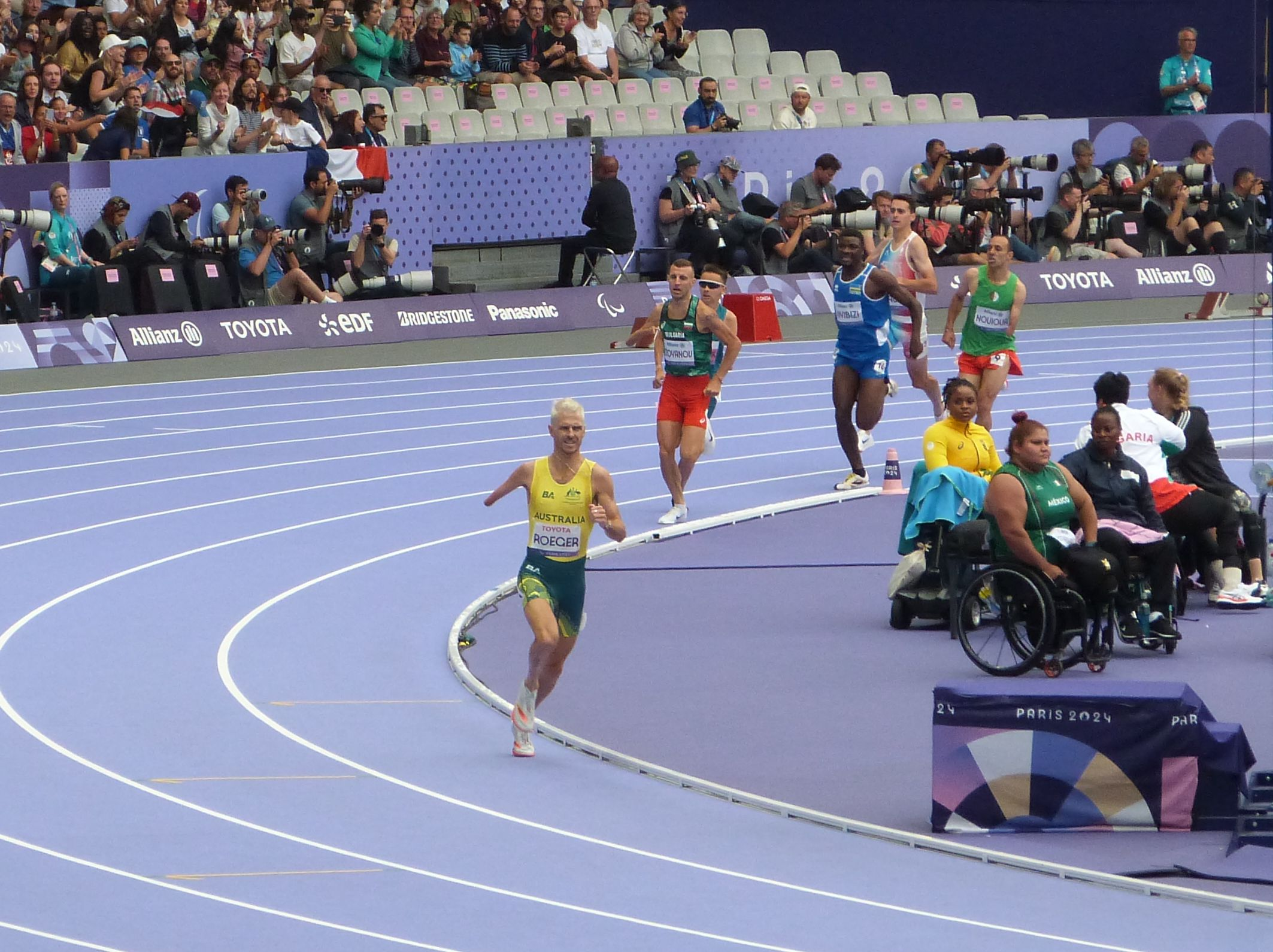
Roeger leading the final of 1500m T46 at Paris Paralympics

At the 2026 Sydney Marathon, he ran 2:18:36, less than four minutes behind the third-best Australian male and 29th overall.It was a word record for the T46 class.

In 2024, he has a scholarship with the South Australian Institute of Sport and trains at the Australian Institute of Sport in Canberra.

=== 1500m progression ===
Distance	Time / Distance	Location	Date
1500m	3:51.08	Melbourne	20 March 2014
1500m	3:50.61	Sydney	19 March 2015
1500m	3:48.55	Boston	June 2015
1500m	3:49.08	Portland	12 June 2016
1500m	3:46.51; Ratified World Record	Sydney	4 February 2017
1500m	3:45.63	Sydney	17 March 2018
1500m	3:44.83	Portland	24 June 2023

=== 5000m progression ===
Distance	Time / Distance	Location	Date
5000m	14:14.91; WR	Canberra	11 March 2016
5000m	14:06.56; WR	Gold Coast, Queensland	15 February 2018
5000m	14.00.25 WR	Sydney	13 March 2021

=== 10000m progression ===
Distance	Time / Distance	Location	Date
10000m	29:24.19; WR	Melbourne	13 December 2018

=== Marathon progression ===
Distance	Time / Distance	Location	Date
Marathon	2:23.31	Melbourne	14 October 2018
Marathon	2:22:51 WR	London	28 April 2019
Marathon	2:19.33 WR	Houston	19 January 2020
Marathon	2:18:53 WR	Sydney	25 April 2021
Marathon	2:18:36 WR	Sydney	30 April 2026

== Recognition ==
- 2014 – awarded Athletics Australia Male Para-athlete of the Year and his coach Philo Saunders was awarded Australian Sports Commission Para-Athletics Coach of the Year.
- 2015 – University of Canberra Coca-Cola Amatil Athlete of the Year and Full Blue Award
- 2015 – nominated Athletics Australia Male Para-athlete of the Year.
- 2016 – Cosmopolitan Bachelor of the Year finalist
- 2017– Strathalbyn's Young Citizen of the Year
- 2018 – awarded Athletics Australia Male Para-athlete of the Year
- 2019 – International Paralympic Committee Athlete of the Month for April 2019
