= Michael Brannigan =

American Paralympic athlete (born 1996)

Mikey Brannigan
Personal information
- Born: November 12, 1996 (age 29) Huntington, New York, United States

Sport
- Sport: Running
- Events: 1000m, 1500m, Mile
Medal record
Men's para-athletics
Representing United States
Paralympic Games
Gold medal – first place	2016 Rio de Janeiro	1500m T20
Bronze medal – third place	2024 Paris	1500 m T20
World Championships
Gold medal – first place	2024 Kobe	1500m T20
Gold medal – first place	2025 New Delhi	1500m T20
Silver medal – second place	2023 Paris	1500m T20
Parapan American Games
Gold medal – first place	2015 Toronto	1500m T20

Michael Brannigan (born November 12, 1996), commonly known as Mikey Brannigan, is an American track and field athlete.

== Career ==
Brannigan was a two-time national champion at Northport High School, winning the individual crown in the 2-mile race as well as the anchor leg of Northport's winning 4 x 1-mile team at the New Balance Nationals Outdoor championships in Greensboro, N.C. in June 2014 (see: The Northport Observer, 6/19/14 and 6/26/14 editions). He was a six-time National H.S. All-American (see: The Northport Observer, 3/19/15 edition).

Brannigan was not allowed to compete at the collegiate level because he could not meet National Collegiate Athletic Association (NCAA) academic standards, due to autism.

He announced he would compete as a professional prior to his June 2015 graduation from Northport High School (see: The Northport Observer, 5/7/15 edition).

He competed at the 2016 Summer Paralympics in the men's 1500-meter race, winning a gold medal.

He finished fourth in the 1500m at the 2020 Paralympic Games in Tokyo in September 2021 (see: The Northport Observer, 9/9/21 edition).

He won the bronze medal in the 1500m at the 2024 Summer Paralympics in Paris in September 2024 (see: The Northport Observer, 9/12/24 edition).

== Personal life ==
Brannigan was born on November 12, 1996, in East Northport, New York, to parents Edie and Kevin Brannigan. Both parents said they knew of his disability at 18 months of age, and he was diagnosed with autism at age 2. He was nonverbal until age 5. He began running at age 8 under the guidance of Steve Cuomo, the founder of the Rolling Thunder program for runners with mental and physical disabilities (https://www.youtube.com/watch?v=r0Gtdf2HAM8). He attended Northport High School, accomplishing an extremely successful distance running career at the scholastic level. Despite his disability, he still saw academic success, taking and passing Algebra I against the recommendations of his school. Brannigan has been coached by Sonja Robinson since 2016
