= Louis Radius =

French Paralympic athlete

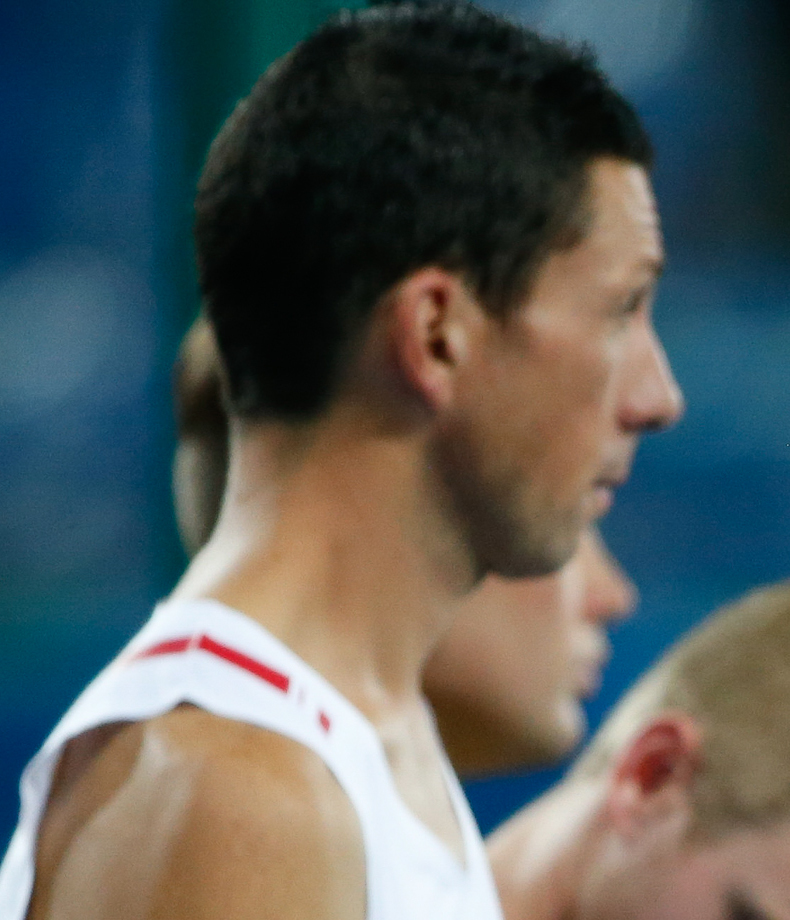
- Radius in 2016

Personal information
- Born: 9 December 1979 (age 46) Suresnes, Hauts-de-Seine, France

Sport
- Country: France
- Sport: Para-athletics
- Disability class: T38
- Events: 800 metres; 1500 metres
Medal record
Representing France
Paralympic Games
Bronze medal – third place	2016 Rio de Janeiro	1500 m T38

Louis Radius (born 9 December 1979 in Suresnes) is a French Paralympic athlete. He represented France at the 2016 Summer Paralympics in Rio de Janeiro, Brazil and he won the bronze medal in the men's 1500 metres T38 event.

He won the silver medal twice in the men's 1500 metres T38 event at the World Championships, both in 2015 and in 2017.

He also competed at the European Championships in 2014, 2016 and 2018 and, in total, he won two gold medals and two silver medals.

== Achievements ==
Year	Competition	Venue	Position	Event	Notes
Representing France
2014	European Championships	Swansea, United Kingdom	2nd	1,500 m	4:21.44
2015	World Championships	Doha, Qatar	3rd	800 m	2:05.39
2015	World Championships	Doha, Qatar	2nd	1,500 m	4:10.87
2016	European Championships	Grosseto, Italy	1st	800 m	2:06.11
2016	European Championships	Grosseto, Italy	1st	1,500 m	4:20.01
2016	Summer Paralympics	Rio de Janeiro, Brazil	3rd	1,500 m	4:17.19
2017	World Championships	London, United Kingdom	2nd	1,500 m	4:12.25
2018	European Championships	Berlin, Germany	2nd	1,500 m	4:16.66
