= Deon Kenzie =

Australian Paralympic athlete (born 1996)

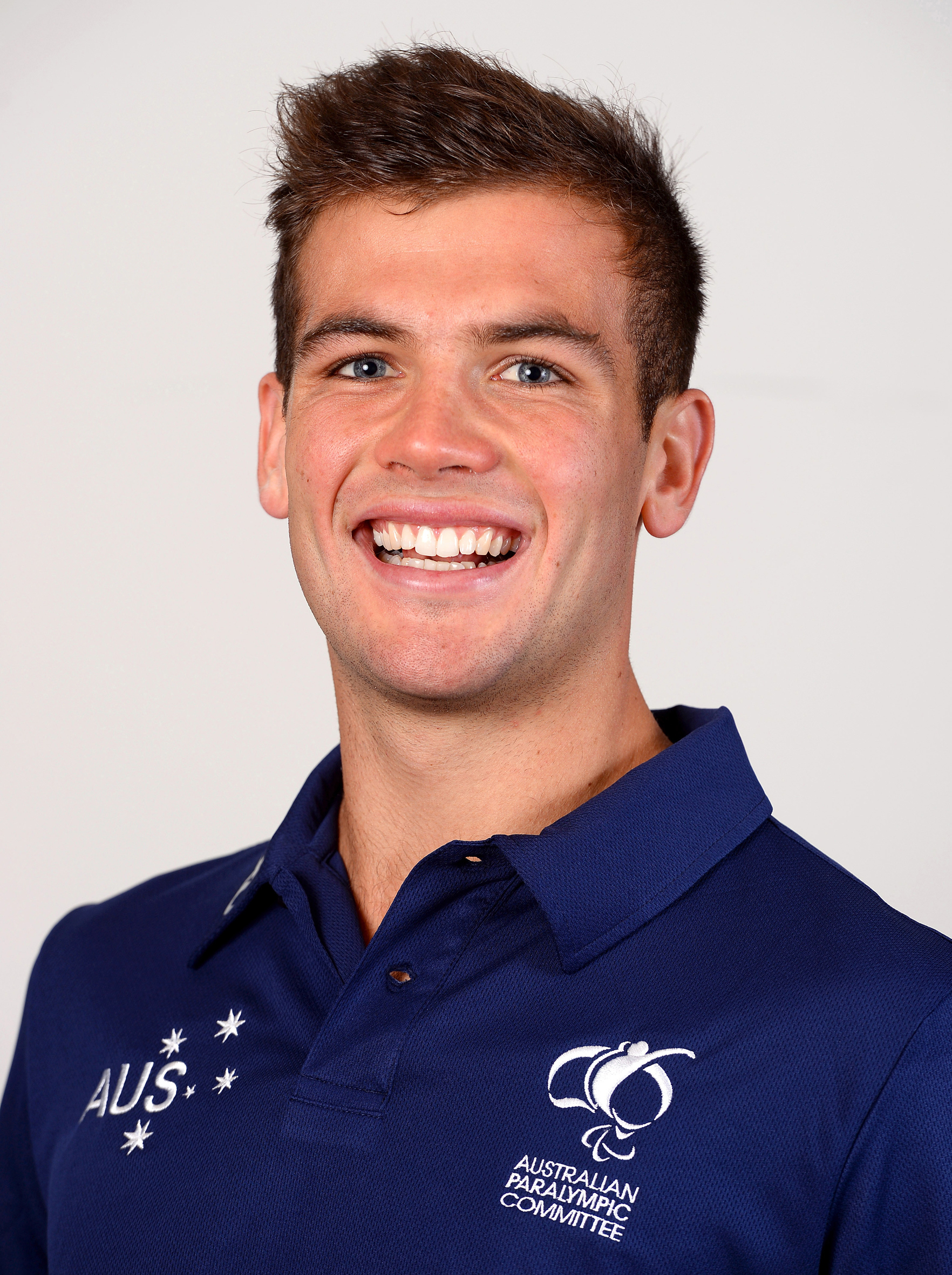
- 2016 Australian Paralympic team portrait

Personal information
- Nationality: Australian
- Born: 11 March 1996 (age 30) Devonport, Tasmania

Sport
- Country: Australia
- Sport: Paralympic athletics
- Event: 1500m
- Club: North West Athletic Club (TAS)
- Coached by: Mike Gunson and Philo Saunders
Medal record
Men's paralympic athletics
Representing Australia
Paralympic Games
Silver medal – second place	2016 Rio	1500 m T38
Bronze medal – third place	2020 Tokyo	1500 m T38
World Para Athletics ChampionshipsWorld Championships
Bronze medal – third place	2013 Lyon	1500 m T38
Bronze medal – third place	2015 Doha	1500 m T38
Gold medal – first place	2017 London	1500 m T38
Silver medal – second place	2017 London	800 m T38
Bronze medal – third place	2019 Dubai	1500 m T38
Bronze medal – third place	2024 Kobe	1500 m T38

Deon Kenzie (born 11 March 1996) is an Australian para-athlete who competes in the T38 (classification) prominently in the 1500m. He has won medals at the 2013, 2015, 2017, 2019, and 2024 World Para Athletics Championships including gold in the Men's 1500 m T38 in 2017. He won a silver medal in the Men's 1500 m T38 at the 2016 Rio Paralympics and a bronze medal at the 2020 Tokyo Paralympics.

== Personal ==
Kenzie was born in Devonport, Tasmania. He has cerebral palsy, which affects the right side of his body. He has attended Forth Primary, Devonport High School and The Don College. He lives in Forth, Tasmania.

== Athletics ==
In 2013, Kenzie made his international debut at the IPC Athletics World Championships in Lyon, France. Competing in the T38 1500m against the likes of Michael McKillop and Abbes Saidi, Kenzie led the first lap before eventually hanging on in the later stages for the bronze medal.

On 13 December 2014, he broke the Men's 1500m T38 world record at an athletics meeting in the Domain Athletic Centre in Hobart. His time of 4.08.51 beat Abbes Saidi of Tunisia world record of 4:09.50 that was set in July 2005. Kenzie is coached by Mike Gunson.

At the 2015 IPC Athletics World Championships in Doha, he won the bronze medal in the Men's 1500m T38 in a time of 4:11.60. In the Men's 800m T38, whilst sitting in the bronze medal position coming into the home straight, he fell and eventually finished in seventh place in 2:11.58. After winning the bronze medal in the Men's 1500m, he said: "It's a great reward for all the hard work that I’ve put in this year and I can’t wait to get home to start working with Gunner (coach, Mike Gunson) and Philo (Saunders) on a program that will have me in the best possible shape when it counts even more in 2016."

Kenzie won a silver medal at the Men's 1500m T38 at the 2016 Rio Paralympics with a time of 4:14.95.

on 31 March 2017 in Sydney, he set a world record in the Men's 1500m T38 with a time of 4:05.11.

At the 2017 World Para Athletics Championships in London, England, he won the gold medal in the Men's 1500 m T38 ((4:06.68)) and silver medal in the Men's 800 m T38 (2:02.15 Australian record).

In his only event at the 2019 World Para Athletics Championships in Dubai, Kenzie won the bronze medal in the Men's 1500 m T38.

At the 2020 Tokyo Summer Paralympics, he won the bronze medal in the Men's 1500 T38.

In the lead up to the 2024 Summer Paralympics in Paris, Kenzie won the bronze medal at in the Men's 1500m T38 at the 2024 World Para Athletics Championships in Kobe.

He is a Tasmanian Institute of Sport athletics scholarship holder.

== Recognition ==
- 2013 – The Advocate-IGA Junior Sports Awards.
- 2014 – Athletics Tasmania U18 Athlete of the Year
- 2014 – Finalist for the Athletics Australia Para Athlete of the Year award.
