= Aleksander Kossakowski =

Polish Paralympic athlete (born 1994)

Personal information
- Nicknames: Aleczek, Alek
- Born: 15 March 1994 (age 32) Kielce, Poland
- Height: 1.78 m (5 ft 10 in)

Sport
- Country: Poland
- Sport: Para athletics
- Disability: Retinitis pigmentosa
- Disability class: T11
Medal record
Para athletics
Representing Poland
World Championships
Bronze medal – third place	2017 London	1500m T11
Bronze medal – third place	2019 Doha	1500m T11
Bronze medal – third place	2023 Paris	1500m T11
European Championships
Gold medal – first place	2018 Berlin	1500m T11
Gold medal – first place	2020 Bydgoszcz	1500m T11
Silver medal – second place	2018 Berlin	5000m T11
Bronze medal – third place	2016 Grosseto	1500m T11

Aleksander Kossakowski (born 15 March 1994) is a Polish Paralympic athlete who competes in middle-distance running at international elite events. He has won three bronze medals at the World Para Athletics Championships and two gold medals at the World Para Athletics European Championships in the 1500 metres.
