= Liam Stanley =

Canadian Paralympic athlete (born 1997)

Personal information
- Born: June 12, 1997 (age 29) Victoria, British Columbia
Medal record
Paralympic athletics
Representing Canada
Paralympic Games
Silver medal – second place	2016 Rio de Janeiro	1500m T37
World Championships
Silver medal – second place	2017 London	1500m T37
Parapan American Games
Silver medal – second place	2019 Lima	1500m T37
Silver medal – second place	2023 Santiago	1500m T38
Bronze medal – third place	2019 Lima	400m T37

Liam Stanley (born June 12, 1997) is a Canadian athlete in track & field and para soccer. He made his Canada national team debut at the 2016 Summer Paralympics where he won a silver medal in the Men's 1500 metres T37.

== Early life ==
Stanley was born on June 12, 1997, in Victoria, British Columbia. At birth, he suffered a stroke which left him weak on his right side. Growing up, he attended Glenlyon Norfolk School, where he played soccer.

== Career ==
In 2013, Stanley was honoured as Canadian Para Soccer Player of the Year after playing for the Canada national cerebral palsy football team in the Tournoi international and Intercontinental Cup. The following year, Stanley qualified for the America Cup and was named Canadian Para Soccer Player of the Year for the second consecutive time. He was later named to Team Canada's roster for the 2015 CP Football World Championships and the 2015 Parapan American Games.

After Team Canada failed to qualify for Brazil, he began to start training for track. Stanley eventually made his Paralympic debut during the 2016 Summer Paralympics, earning a silver medal in the Men's 1500 metres T37. Stanley was later named to Canada's 2017 IFCPF CP Football World Championships team.

Upon qualifying for the 2017 World Para Athletics Championships men's T38 800-metre final, Stanley set a new record for fastest time with 2 minutes and 5.89 seconds. During the finals, Stanley took home a silver medal with a time of 4 minutes and 37.96 seconds during the Men's 1500 metres. On May 16, 2018, Stanley was named 2017 Ambulatory Athlete of the Year by Athletics Canada. He was also named Athlete of the Year with a disability by Sport BC.

On September 26, 2019, Stanley was named to Team Canada's roster for the 2019 World Para Athletics Championships, where he placed fifth in the men's 1500-metre T38 finals.
