= T38 (classification) =

Para-athletics classification

T38 and CP8 are disability sport classification for disability athletics intended for people with cerebral palsy. It includes people who have coordination impairments such as hypertonia, ataxia and athetosis. Runners in this class may appear to have a slight limp when they are running but otherwise have a stride similar to able-bodied runners. Events for this class include 100 meters, 400 meters, 1,500 meters, and the long jump.

== Sport ==
T38 competitor Evan O'Hanlon

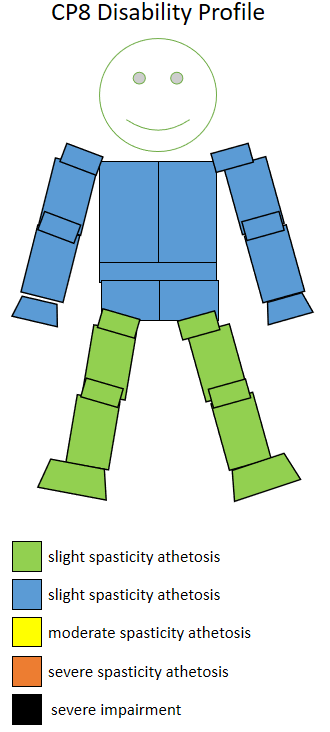
The spasticity athetosis level and location of a CP8 sportsperson.

This classification is for disability athletics. This classification is one of seven classifications for athletes with cerebral palsy. Similar classifications are T32, T33, T34, T35, T36, T37 and T38. The T35 to T38 classes are classes for ambulant sportspeople. The Australian Paralympic Committee defines this classification as being for "Minimal hemiplegia, ataxia, diplegia or athetosis. May have minimal co-ordination problems, good balance. Runs and jumps freely." The International Paralympic Committee defined this classification on their website in July 2016 as, "Coordination impairments (hypertonia, ataxia and athetosis)". They then go into more detail saying, "Athletes have clear evidence of hypertonia, ataxia and/or athetosis on physical assessment that will affect running. Co-ordination impairment is mild to moderate and can be in one to four limbs. Co-ordination and balance are typically mildly affected, and overall these athletes are able to run and jump freely."

== Disability groups ==
Multiple types of disabilities are eligible to compete in this class. This class includes people who have cerebral palsy, or who have had a stroke or traumatic brain injury.

=== Cerebral palsy ===
==== CP8 ====
In athletic events, CP8 competitors participate T38/F38 classes. In athletics, the form used in racing appears similar to able-bodied competitors, but should have some sort of visible limp. The class participates in jumping events.

Cerebral Palsy-International Sports and Recreation Association defined this class in January 2005 as, "Minimal involvement 27 This class is for the minimally affected diplegic Spasticity Grade 1; hemiplegic Spasticity Grade 1: monoplegic; minimal athetoid/ataxic athlete. According to point 1.2 the athlete must have an obvious impairment of function evident during classification. This athlete may appear to have near normal function when running but the athlete must demonstrate a limitation in function to classifiers based on evidence of spasticity (increased tone), ataxic, athetoid or dystonic movements while performing on the field of play or in training." This is general manifested as spasticity in at least one limb. They are able to freely engage in a number of sport related motions including jumping. They also tend to have good balance and have minimal issues with coordination. People in this class tend to have energy expenditure similar to people without cerebral palsy.

=== Les Autres ===
People with Les Autres related disabilities also compete in this class because of their hypertonia, ataxia and/or athetosis.

== Rules and performance ==
Athletes in this class are not required to use a starting block. It is up to the individual. They have the option to start from a crouch, from a standing position or 3 point stance. In track events, officials are encouraged to avoid keeping these athletes in the starting block too long. Because of their condition, athletes may make movements that normally would disqualify them as a false start. If an official believes movement could be a result of this, they can restart the entire field without disqualifying any runners.

== History ==
The classification was created by the International Paralympic Committee and has roots in a 2003 attempt to address "the overall objective to support and co-ordinate the ongoing development of accurate, reliable, consistent and credible sport focused classification systems and their implementation." For the 2016 Summer Paralympics in Rio, the International Paralympic Committee had a zero classification at the Games policy. This policy was put into place in 2014, with the goal of avoiding last minute changes in classes that would negatively impact athlete training preparations. All competitors needed to be internationally classified with their classification status confirmed prior to the Games, with exceptions to this policy being dealt with on a case-by-case basis. In case there was a need for classification or reclassification at the Games despite best efforts otherwise, athletics classification was scheduled for September 4 and September 5 at Olympic Stadium. For sportspeople with physical or intellectual disabilities going through classification or reclassification in Rio, their in competition observation event is their first appearance in competition at the Games.

== Events ==
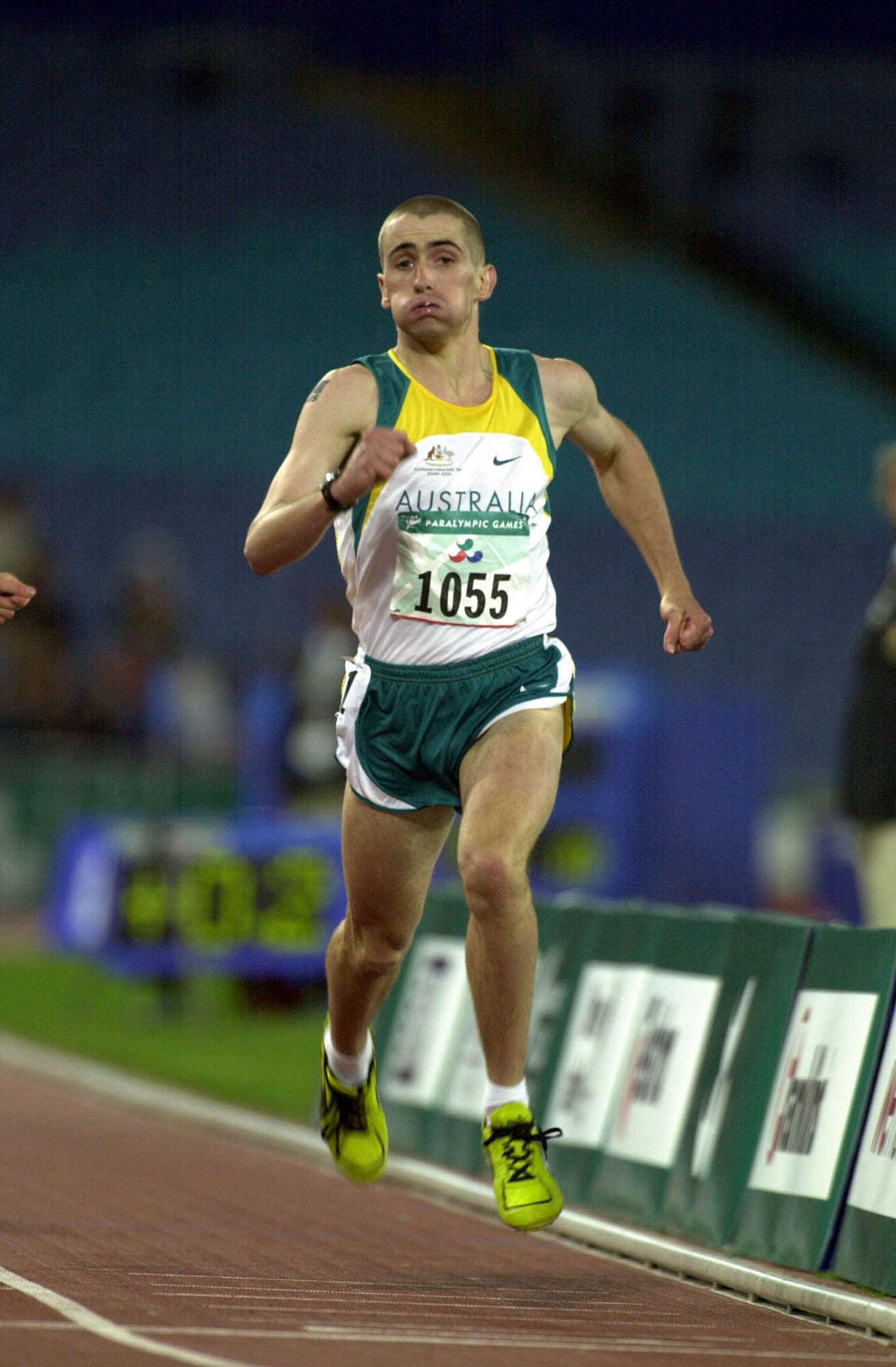
CP8 / T38 track and field athlete Tim Sullivan.

The class participates in 100 metres, 400 metres, 1,500 metres, and the long jump. They may also participate in the 4 × 100 metres relay with other T35-38 class athletes, however no more than two T38-classified athletes are permitted per relay team. Many events have their own qualifying standards for participation.

Qualification standards for the 2016 Summer Paralympics
Event	Men		Women	
Event	AQS	BQS	AQS	BQS
100 metres	11.85	13.00	14.40	15.80
400 metres	56.55	1:00.00	1:10.00	1:17.00
1500 metres	5:00.00	5:10.00	—	
Long jump	5.00	4.40	4.00	3.75
Discus throw	—		26.50	22.00
Javelin throw	35.00	30.00	—	

gender	Event	Class	AQS/MQS	BQS	Event
men's	100m	T38	15.5		2016 IPC Athletics Asia-Oceania Championships
women's	100m	T38	17		2016 IPC Athletics Asia-Oceania Championships
men's	100m	T38	00:12.8		2016 CAIXA Loteria Athletics Open Championship
women's	100m	T38	00:18.0		2016 CAIXA Loteria Athletics Open Championship
men's	100m	T38	12.5		2015 IPC Athletics World Championships
women's	100m	T38	15		2015 IPC Athletics World Championships
men's	100m	T38	13.1		2016 IPC Athletics European Championships
women's	100m	T38	15.8		2016 IPC Athletics European Championships
men's	100m	T38	13.25		2014 IPC Athletics European Championships
women's	100m	T38	15.8		2014 IPC Athletics European Championships
men's	100m	T38	16	13	2016 IPC Athletics Asia-Oceania Championships
men's	100m	T38	13.5		2015 Parapan American Games
women's	100m	T38	16.5		2015 Parapan American Games
men's	1500m	T37/38	05:20.0		2016 IPC Athletics Asia-Oceania Championships
men's	1500m	T38	05:00.0		2015 IPC Athletics World Championships
men's	1500m	T37/38	05:10.0		2016 IPC Athletics European Championships
men's	1500m	T37/38	05:00.0		2014 IPC Athletics European Championships
men's	1500m	T37/38	05:20.0	04:55.0	2016 IPC Athletics Asia-Oceania Championships
men's	1500m	T37/38	05:10.0		2015 Parapan American Games
men's	200m	T38	31		2016 IPC Athletics Asia-Oceania Championships
women's	200m	T38	37		2016 IPC Athletics Asia-Oceania Championships
men's	200m	T38	25.2		2015 IPC Athletics World Championships
women's	200m	T38	32		2015 IPC Athletics World Championships
men's	200m	T38	27		2016 IPC Athletics European Championships
women's	200m	T38	33.6		2016 IPC Athletics European Championships
men's	200m	T38	27		2014 IPC Athletics European Championships
men's	200m	T38	31		2016 IPC Athletics Asia-Oceania Championships
men's	200m	T38	27		2015 Parapan American Games
women's	200m	T38	35		2015 Parapan American Games
men's	400m	T38	01:10.0		2016 IPC Athletics Asia-Oceania Championships
women's	400m	T38	01:25.0		2016 IPC Athletics Asia-Oceania Championships
men's	400m	T38	01:00.0		2016 CAIXA Loteria Athletics Open Championship
women's	400m	T38	01:25.0		2016 CAIXA Loteria Athletics Open Championship
men's	400m	T38	58		2015 IPC Athletics World Championships
women's	400m	T38	01:10.0		2015 IPC Athletics World Championships
men's	400m	T38	01:05.0		2016 IPC Athletics European Championships
women's	400m	T38	01:19.0		2016 IPC Athletics European Championships
men's	400m	T38	01:05.0		2014 IPC Athletics European Championships
women's	400m	T38	01:20.0		2014 IPC Athletics European Championships
men's	400m	T38	01:10.0	01:00.0	2016 IPC Athletics Asia-Oceania Championships
men's	400m	T38	1.07.00		2015 Parapan American Games
women's	400m	T37/38	01:20.0		2015 Parapan American Games
women's	4 × 100 m	T35-38	ranking		2016 IPC Athletics European Championships
women's	4 × 100 m	T35-38	nil		2014 IPC Athletics European Championships
men's	800m	T37/38	2.30.00		2016 IPC Athletics Asia-Oceania Championships
men's	800m	T37/38	02:18.0		2015 IPC Athletics World Championships
men's	800m	T37/38	02:30.0		2016 IPC Athletics European Championships
men's	800m	T37/38	02:30.0		2014 IPC Athletics European Championships
men's	800m	T37/38	02:30.0		2016 IPC Athletics Asia-Oceania Championships
men's	discus	F38	25.00m		2016 IPC Athletics Asia-Oceania Championships
women's	discus	F38	16.00m		2016 IPC Athletics Asia-Oceania Championships
women's	discus	F37/38	22.00m		2015 IPC Athletics World Championships
women's	discus	F38	18.00m		2016 IPC Athletics European Championships
men's	discus	F37/38	37.00m		2014 IPC Athletics European Championships
women's	discus	F37/38	18.00m		2014 IPC Athletics European Championships
men's	discus	F38	25.00m		2016 IPC Athletics Asia-Oceania Championships
women's	discus	F38	25.00m		2015 Parapan American Games
men's	javelin	F38	26.00m		2016 IPC Athletics Asia-Oceania Championships
men's	javelin	F38	35.00m		2015 IPC Athletics World Championships
men's	javelin	F37/38	32.00m		2016 IPC Athletics European Championships
men's	javelin	F37/38	32.00m		2014 IPC Athletics European Championships
men's	javelin	F38	30.00m	30.00m	2016 IPC Athletics Asia-Oceania Championships
women's	javelin	F38	20.00m		2015 Parapan American Games
men's	long jump	T38	4.00m		2016 IPC Athletics Asia-Oceania Championships
women's	long jump	T38	3.60m		2016 IPC Athletics Asia-Oceania Championships
men's	long jump	T38	4.7		2016 CAIXA Loteria Athletics Open Championship
men's	long jump	T38	5.00m		2015 IPC Athletics World Championships
women's	long jump	T38	3.90m		2015 IPC Athletics World Championships
men's	long jump	T38	4.20m		2016 IPC Athletics European Championships
women's	long jump	T38	3.60m		2016 IPC Athletics European Championships
men's	long jump	T38	4.50m		2014 IPC Athletics European Championships
women's	long jump	T38	3.50m		2014 IPC Athletics European Championships
men's	long jump	T38	4.00m	4.40m	2016 IPC Athletics Asia-Oceania Championships
men's	long jump	T38	4.40m		2015 Parapan American Games
women's	long jump	T38	3.50m		2015 Parapan American Games
men's	shot put	F38	9.00m		2016 IPC Athletics Asia-Oceania Championships
women's	shot put	F38	5.40m		2016 IPC Athletics Asia-Oceania Championships
men's	shot put	F38	10.00m		2015 IPC Athletics World Championships
men's	shot put	F38	9.00m		2016 IPC Athletics European Championships
men's	shot put	F38	9.00m		2014 IPC Athletics European Championships
women's	shot put	F38	8.00m		2015 Parapan American Games

== Governance ==
Classification into this class is handled by the International Paralympic Committee. For national events, classification is handled by the national athletics organization.

== Becoming classified ==
Athletes with cerebral palsy or similar impairments who wish to compete in para-athletics competition must first undergo a classification assessment. During this, they both undergo a bench test of muscle coordination and demonstrate their skills in athletics, such as running, jumping or throwing. A determination is then made as to what classification an athlete should compete in. Classifications may be Confirmed or Review status. For athletes who do not have access to a full classification panel, Provisional classification is available; this is a temporary Review classification, considered an indication of class only, and generally used only in lower levels of competition.

== Competitors ==
Notable competitors in this class include T38 Australian sprinter Tim Sullivan. At the home hosted 2000 Summer Paralympics, he won three gold medals. Australian athletics competitors in this class include Evan O'Hanlon, Tim Sullivan and Katy Parrish.
