= Athletics at the 2020 Summer Paralympics – Men's 1500 metres =

The Men's 1500m athletics events for the 2020 Summer Paralympics took place at the Tokyo National Stadium from August 28 to September 4, 2021. A total of 7 events were contested over this distance.

== Schedule ==
| R | Round 1 | ½ | Semifinals | F | Final |

| Date | Sat 28 | | Sun 29 | | Mon 30 | | Tue 31 | | Wed 1 | | Thu 2 | | Fri 3 | | Sat 4 | |
| Event | M | E | M | E | M | E | M | E | M | E | M | E | M | E | M | E |
|---|---|---|---|---|---|---|---|---|---|---|---|---|---|---|---|---|
| T11 1500m | | | | | R | | F | | | | | | | | | |
| T13 1500m | | | | | R | | F | | | | | | | | | |
| T20 1500m | | | | | | | | | | | | | F | | | |
| T38 1500m | | | | | | | | | | | | | | R | | F |
| T46 1500m | F | | | | | | | | | | | | | | | |
| T52 1500m | | R | | F | | | | | | | | | | | | |
| T54 1500m | | | | | R | | F | | | | | | | | | |

== Medal summary ==
The following is a summary of the medals awarded across all 1500 metres events.

| Classification | Gold | | Silver | | Bronze | |
|---|---|---|---|---|---|---|
| T11 | Brazil; Yeltsin Jacques guide: Carlos dos Santos | 3:57.60 WR | Japan; Shinya Wada guide: Takumi Hasebe | 4:05.27 AR | Fedor Rudakov; RPC | 4:05.55 |
| T13 | Anton Kuliatin; RPC | 3:54.04 | Rouay Jebabli; Tunisia | 3:54.55 | Jaryd Clifford; Australia | 3:54.69 |
| T20 | Owen Miller; Great Britain | 3:54.57 | Alexandr Rabotnitskii; RPC | 3:55.78 | Ndiaga Dieng; Italy | 3:57.24 |
| T38 | Nathan Riech; Canada | 3:58.92 GR | Abdelkrim Krai; Algeria | 4:03.07 AR | Deon Kenzie; Australia | 4:03.76 |
| T46 | Aleksandr Iaremchuk; RPC | 3:52.08 | Hristiyan Stoyanov; Bulgaria | 3:52.63 | David Emong; Uganda | 3:53.51 |
| T52 | Tomoki Sato; Japan | 3:29.13 GR | Raymond Martin; United States | 3:29.72 AR | Hirokazu Ueyonabaru; Japan | 3:44.17 |
| T54 | Marcel Hug; Switzerland | 2:49.55 WR | Prawat Wahoram; Thailand | 2:50.20 AR | Putharet Khongrak; Thailand | 2:50.68 |

== Results ==
The following were the results of the finals only of each of the Men's 1500 metres events in each of the classifications. Further details of each event, including where appropriate heats and semi finals results, are available on that event's dedicated page.

=== T11 ===
The T11 category is for athletes with a visual impairment. A T11 athlete may be entirely without sight, or be able to perceive light, but have no ability to see the shape of a hand at any distance. T11 athletes commonly run with guides.

The final in this classification took place on 31 August, at 9:38:

| Rank | Name | Nationality | Time | Notes |
|---|---|---|---|---|
| 1st place, gold medalist(s) | Yeltsin Jacques | Brazil | 3:57.60 | WR |
| 2nd place, silver medalist(s) | Shinya Wada | Japan | 4:05.27 | AR |
| 3rd place, bronze medalist(s) | Fedor Rudakov | RPC | 4:05.55 | PB |
| 4 | Kenya Karasawa | Japan | 4:08.84 | SB |
| 5 | Darwin Castro | Ecuador | 4:10.24 | PB |
| 6 | Erick Kiptoo Sang | Kenya | 4:21.53 | |
| 7 | Cristian Valenzuela | Chile | 4:30.04 | |

=== T13 ===
The T13 category is for athletes with a moderate visual impairment. Athletes in this category have a variety of visual impairments, but can typically recognize contours from a distance of 2 to 6 metres. Athletes in this category do not typically require a guide.

The final in this classification took place on 31 August 2021, at 9:48:

| Rank | Name | Nationality | Time | Notes |
|---|---|---|---|---|
| 1st place, gold medalist(s) | Anton Kuliatin | RPC | 3:54.04 | |
| 2nd place, silver medalist(s) | Rouay Jebabli | Tunisia | 3:54.55 | PB |
| 3rd place, bronze medalist(s) | Jaryd Clifford | Australia | 3:54.69 | |
| 4 | Aleksandr Kostin | RPC | 3:55.57 | |
| 5 | Egor Sharov | RPC | 3:56.36 | |
| 6 | Yassine Ouhdadi El Ataby | Spain | 3:56.73 | |
| 7 | Tamiru Demisse | Ethiopia | 3:59.08 | |
| 8 | Abdellatif Baka | Algeria | 3:59.56 | SB |
| 9 | Achraf Lahouel | Tunisia | 3:59.99 | SB |
| 10 | Joel Gomez | United States | 4:02.41 | |
| 11 | Sam Harding | Australia | 4:05.13 | |

=== T20 ===
The T20 category is for athletes with intellectual impairment. T20 athletes have an IQ score of 75 or less.

The final in this classification took place on 3 September 2021, at 10:13:

| Rank | Name | Nationality | Time | Notes |
|---|---|---|---|---|
| 1st place, gold medalist(s) | Owen Miller | Great Britain | 3:54.57 | |
| 2nd place, silver medalist(s) | Alexandr Rabotnitskii | RPC | 3:55.78 | |
| 3rd place, bronze medalist(s) | Ndiaga Dieng | Italy | 3:57.24 | |
| 4 | Michael Brannigan | United States | 3:58.43 | SB |
| 5 | Daiki Akai | Japan | 3:58.78 | |
| 6 | Pavel Sarkeev | RPC | 4:00.43 | |
| 7 | Daniel Pek | Poland | 4:01.00 | SB |
| 8 | Yuki Iwata | Japan | 4:01.72 | |
| 9 | Yuji Togawa | Japan | 4:03.62 | |
| 10 | Carmelo Rivera Fuentes | Puerto Rico | 4:03.68 | PB |
| 11 | Cristiano Pereira | Portugal | 4:05.10 | |
| 12 | Sandro Patricio Correia Baessa | Portugal | 4:05.50 | |
| 13 | Pavlo Voluikevych | Ukraine | 4:05.75 | |
| 14 | Gaël Geffroy | France | 4:15.52 | |

=== T38 ===
The T38 category is for ambulant athletes with cerebral palsy. T38 athletes have the mildest form of impairment caused by cerebral palsy, often in only one limb, and not affecting the ability to run, walk or jump freely, although impairing performance. T38 athletes may suffer minor co-ordination difficulties.

The final in this classification took place on 4 September 2021, at 19:15:

| Rank | Name | Nationality | Time | Notes |
|---|---|---|---|---|
| 1st place, gold medalist(s) | Nathan Riech | Canada | 3:58.92 | GR |
| 2nd place, silver medalist(s) | Abdelkrim Krai | Algeria | 4:03.07 | AR |
| 3rd place, bronze medalist(s) | Deon Kenzie | Australia | 4:03.76 | |
| 4 | Redouane Hennouni-Bouzidi | France | 4:05.95 | |
| 5 | Liam Stanley | Canada | 4:06.95 | PB |
| 6 | Daniel Bounty | Australia | 4:12.95 | |
| 7 | Louis Radius | France | 4:17.19 | |
| 8 | Michael McKillop | Ireland | 4:27.69 | |
| 9 | Carlos Alberto Castillo | Nicaragua | 4:54.91 | SB |

=== T46 ===
The T46 category is for athletes who have a single above or below elbow amputation or similar disability, with normal function in both legs.

The final in this classification took place on 28 August 2021, at 10:28:

| Rank | Athlete | Nation | Time | Notes |
|---|---|---|---|---|
| 1st place, gold medalist(s) | Aleksandr Iaremchuk | RPC | 3:52.08 | |
| 2nd place, silver medalist(s) | Hristiyan Stoyanov | Bulgaria | 3:52.63 | |
| 3rd place, bronze medalist(s) | David Emong | Uganda | 3:53.51 | PB |
| 4 | Samir Nouioua | Algeria | 3:55.56 | SB |
| 5 | Gemechu Amenu Dinsa | Ethiopia | 3:56.04 | PB |
| 6 | Felix Kipruto | Kenya | 3:59.98 | PB |
| 7 | Christian Lykkeby Olsen | Denmark | 4:00.16 | PB |
| 8 | Hermas Muvunyi | Rwanda | 4:00.46 | PB |
| 9 | Luke Nuttall | Great Britain | 4:02.65 | |
| 10 | Remy Nikobimeze | Burundi | 4:05.44 | SB |
| 11 | Manuel Ernestro Jaime | Angola | 4:09.79 | SB |
| 12 | Li Chaoyan | China | 4:11.63 | SB |

=== T52 ===
The T52 category is for wheelchair athletes with damage to spinal cord in the higher parts of the back, substantially impaired or no trunk function, and minimal or no leg function. Pushing power comes from elbow extensions, and appears close to normal except for use of modified gloves to compensate for grip.

The final in this classification took place on 29 August 2021, at 20:42:

| Rank | Athlete | Nation | Time | Notes |
|---|---|---|---|---|
| 1st place, gold medalist(s) | Tomoki Sato | Japan | 3:29.13 | GR |
| 2nd place, silver medalist(s) | Raymond Martin | United States | 3:29.72 | AR |
| 3rd place, bronze medalist(s) | Hirokazu Ueyonabaru | Japan | 3:44.17 | PB |
| 4 | Thomas Geierspichler | Austria | 3:54.77 | SB |
| 5 | Leonardo De Jesus Perez Juarez | Mexico | 3:54.82 | SB |
| 6 | Jerrold Mangliwan | Philippines | 3:58.24 | PB |
| 7 | Isaiah Rigo | United States | 3:59.42 | |

=== T54 ===
The T54 category is for wheelchair athletes with no leg function, but near full arm function and reasonable to normal trunk function. Typically this may be caused by a lower spinal cord injury or spinal cord birth defect.

The final in this classification took place on 31 August 2021, at 11:46:

| Rank | Athlete | Nation | Time | Notes |
|---|---|---|---|---|
| 1st place, gold medalist(s) | Marcel Hug | Switzerland | 2:49.55 | WR |
| 2nd place, silver medalist(s) | Prawat Wahoram | Thailand | 2:50.20 | AR |
| 3rd place, bronze medalist(s) | Putharet Khongrak | Thailand | 2:50.68 | PB |
| 4 | Zhang Yong | China | 2:50.78 | PB |
| 5 | Daniel Romanchuk | United States | 2:50.86 | AR |
| 6 | Daniel Sidbury | Great Britain | 2:51.11 | PB |
| 7 | Julien Casoli | France | 2:51.69 | PB |
| 8 | Zhang Ying | China | 2:53.26 | PB |
| 9 | Tomoki Suzuki | Japan | 2:53.60 | PB |
| 10 | David Weir | Great Britain | 2:53.84 | PB |
