= Athletics at the 2020 Summer Paralympics =

Athletics at the XVI Paralympic Games
- Athletics pictogram of the 2020 Summer Paralympics
- Venue: Tokyo National Stadium
- Dates: 27 August – 5 September 2021
- Competitors: 1100 in 168 events from 129 nations

Athletics at the 2020 Summer Paralympics were held in the National Stadium in Tokyo. There was 167 medal events: 93 for men, 73 for women and one mixed event. It was the largest contest of the Games programme regarding athlete numbers and medal events to be scheduled.

The 2020 Summer Olympic and Paralympic Games were postponed to 2021 due to the COVID-19 pandemic. They kept the 2020 name and were instead held from 24 August to 5 September 2021.

== Classification and events ==
Participating athletes are given a classification depending on their disabilities (T denotes track events, F denotes field events). They are categorised into seven different classifications:

- T/F11-13: Blind (11) and visually impaired (12-13) athletes; track athletes would often run with a guide.
- T/F20: Athletes who have an intellectual disability.
- T/F 31-38: Athletes who have cerebral palsy or other coordination impairments. 31-34 for wheelchair events and 35-38 for running events.
- F40-41: Les Autres - typically for athletes who have dwarfism.
- T/F 42-47: Athletes who are amputees. In field events, some athletes would compete in seated events.
- T/F 51-58: Athletes who have a spinal cord injury or disability. In field events, most athletes would compete in seated events.
- T/F 61-64: Athletes who have a prosthesis affected by limb deficiency and leg length difference.
- RR1, RR2, RR3 Athletes with severe co-ordination impairment (hypertonia, ataxia, athetosis) competing in RaceRunning events.

=== Event summary table ===
Athletics at the 2020 Summer Paralympics - Men's Events
Classification Event	Visual Impairment			ID	Cerebral Palsy athletes T32-34 Wheelchair : T35-38 Ambulant							RG		Amputee athletes						Wheelchair athletes Spinal injuries							Prosthesis athletes			
Classification Event	T11	T12	T13	T20	T32	T33	T34	T35	T36	T37	T38	T40	T41	T42	T43	T44	T45	T46	T47	T51	T52	T53	T54	T55	T56	T57	T61	T62	T63	T64
Classification Event	F11	F12	F13	F20	F32	F33	F34	F35	F36	F37	F38	F40	F41	F42	F43	F44	F45	F46	F47	F51	F52	F53	F54	F55	F56	F57	F61	F62	F63	F64
Track events
100 metres	●	●	●			●	●	●	●	●	●						>>	>>	●	●	●	●	●						●	●
200 metres								●		●										●							●			●
400 metres	●	●	●	●					●	●	●						>>	>>	●	>>	●	●	●					●		
800 metres						>>	●															●	●							
1500 metres	●	>>	●	●						>>	●						>>	●		>>	●	>>	●							
5000 metres	●	>>	●																			>>	●							
Marathon	>>	●															>>	●			>>	>>	●							
Field events
High Jump																	>>	>>	●										●	●
Long Jump	●	●	●	●					●	●	●						>>	>>	●										●	●
Shot Put	●	●		●	●	●	●	●	●	●		●	●				>>	●				●	>>	●	>>	●	>>		●	
Discus	●									●										>>	●		>>	>>	●			>>		●
Javelin		>>	●			>>	●				●	>>	●				>>	●				>>	●		>>	●	>>	>>	>>	●
Club throw					●															●										

Athletics at the 2020 Summer Paralympics - Women's Events
Classification Event	Visual Impairment			ID	Cerebral Palsy athletes T32-34 Wheelchair : T35-38 Ambulant							RG		Amputee athletes						Wheelchair athletes Spinal injuries							Prosthesis athletes			
Classification Event	T11	T12	T13	T20	T32	T33	T34	T35	T36	T37	T38	T40	T41	T42	T43	T44	T45	T46	T47	T51	T52	T53	T54	T55	T56	T57	T61	T62	T63	T64
Classification Event	F11	F12	F13	F20	F32	F33	F34	F35	F36	F37	F38	F40	F41	F42	F43	F44	F45	F46	F47	F51	F52	F53	F54	F55	F56	F57	F61	F62	F63	F64
Track events
100 metres	●	●	●			>>	●	●	●	●	●						>>	>>	●			●	●						●	●
200 metres	●	●						●	●	●							>>	>>	●											●
400 metres	●	●	●	●						●	●						>>	>>	●			●	●							
800 metres						>>	●															●	●							
1500 metres	●	>>	●	●																		>>	●							
5000 metres																						>>	●							
Marathon	>>	●																				>>	●							
Field events
Long Jump	●	●		●						●	●						>>	>>	●										●	●
Shot Put	>>	●		●	●	●	●	●	●	●		●	●										●		>>	●				
Discus Throw	●									>>	●	>>	●							>>	>>	●	>>	●	>>	●		>>		●
Javelin		>>	●			>>	●										>>	●				>>	●	>>	●					
Club throw					●															●										

Key:
- ID : Classifications for intellectual disability
- RG : Les Autres classification, including dwarfism and restricted growth
- ● : Event in this classification
- >> : Competitors in this classification may take part in event for the next competed classification, e.g. T33 may compete in T34 event, or both T35 and T36 athletes may compete in a T37 event.

== Participating nations ==
As of June 2021.

- Algeria (22)
- Angola (2)
- Argentina (11)
- Australia (41)
- Austria (3)
- Azerbaijan (12)
- Bahrain (2)
- Belgium (4)
- Bermuda (1)
- Belarus (5)
- Bhutan (2)
- Bosnia and Herzegovina (1)
- Botswana (2)
- Brazil (64)
- Bulgaria (3)
- Burundi (2)
- Cambodia (1)
- Cameroon (2)
- Canada (15)
- Cape Verde (1)
- Central African Republic (1)
- Chile (3)
- China (66)
- Chinese Taipei (2)
- Colombia (19)
- Costa Rica (3)
- Croatia (10)
- Cuba (7)
- Cyprus (1)
- Czech Republic (6)
- Denmark (2)
- Dominican Republic (2)
- Timor-Leste (1)
- Ecuador (8)
- Egypt (3)
- El Salvador (1)
- Estonia (1)
- Ethiopia (2)
- Fiji (1)
- Finland (5)
- France (21)
- Germany (27)
- Georgia (1)
- Ghana (1)
- Great Britain (50)
- Greece (15)
- Grenada (1)
- Guatemala (2)
- Guinea (2)
- Hong Kong (2)
- Hungary (3)
- Iceland (2)
- India (24)
- Indonesia (7)
- Iran (16)
- Iraq (7)
- Ireland (8)
- Israel (1)
- Italy (10)
- Ivory Coast (2)
- Jamaica (2)
- Japan (43) (Host nation)
- Jordan (1)
- Kazakhstan (2)
- Kenya (7)
- Kuwait (3)
- Latvia (4)
- Lebanon (1)
- Lesotho (1)
- Libya (1)
- Lithuania (4)
- Luxembourg (1)
- Malaysia (5)
- Mali (2)
- Mauritius (3)
- Mexico (24)
- Moldova (2)
- Mongolia (2)
- Montenegro (2)
- Morocco (19)
- Mozambique (2)
- Namibia (3)
- Netherlands (17)
- New Zealand (7)
- Nicaragua (1)
- Nigeria (5)
- Norway (2)
- Oman (2)
- Pakistan (2)
- Palestine (1)
- Panama (2)
- Papua New Guinea (1)
- Paraguay (1)
- Peru (4)
- Philippines (2)
- Poland (34)
- Portugal (10)
- Puerto Rico (2)
- Qatar (2)
- Refugee Paralympic Team (1)
- Romania (2)
- RPC (69)
- Rwanda (2)
- Saudi Arabia (5)
- Senegal (2)
- Serbia (4)
- Singapore (1)
- Slovenia (1)
- Slovakia (3)
- Solomon Islands (1)
- South Africa (17)
- South Korea (2)
- Spain (20)
- Sri Lanka (5)
- Sweden (3)
- Switzerland (8)
- Syria (1)
- Thailand (12)
- Trinidad and Tobago (2)
- Tunisia (24)
- Turkey (8)
- Uganda (2)
- Ukraine (31)
- United Arab Emirates (4)
- United States (61)
- Uzbekistan (16)
- Venezuela (14)
- Vietnam (2)
- Zambia (1)
- Zimbabwe (2)

== Schedule ==
●	Finals

August / September	27	28	29	30	31	1	2	3	4	5
Final	13	16	19	16	21	17	18	17	25	5
Cumulative Total	13	29	48	64	85	102	120	137	162	167

== Medal table ==
Two silver medals were awarded for a second-place tie in the men's high jump T47 athletics event. No bronze medal was awarded as a result.

Two bronze medals were awarded for a third-place tie in the men's 100 metres T64 athletics event.

Due to the disqualification of two participants, a bronze medal was not awarded in the women's 100 metres T11 athletics event.

Source (167 Gold, 168 Silver, 166 Bronze) :

Rank	NPC	Gold	Silver	Bronze	Total
1	China	27	13	11	51
2	RPC	12	13	13	38
3	United States	10	17	14	41
4	Great Britain	9	5	10	24
5	Brazil	8	9	11	28
6	Switzerland	7	3	2	12
7	Ukraine	6	15	3	24
8	Iran	5	6	0	11
9	Poland	5	3	3	11
10	Uzbekistan	5	2	2	9
11	Australia	4	7	8	19
12	Germany	4	5	6	15
13	Tunisia	4	5	2	11
14	Morocco	4	4	2	10
15	Spain	4	4	1	9
16	Thailand	4	2	3	9
17	Azerbaijan	4	1	1	6
17	Cuba	4	1	1	6
19	Algeria	3	4	3	10
20	Japan	3	3	6	12
21	Netherlands	3	2	3	8
22	New Zealand	3	2	2	7
23	Venezuela	3	2	1	6
24	South Africa	3	1	2	6
25	Canada	2	4	2	8
26	Mexico	2	1	5	8
27	India	1	5	2	8
28	Italy	1	4	4	9
29	Colombia	1	3	7	11
30	France	1	3	4	8
31	Finland	1	3	1	5
32	Greece	1	2	1	4
33	Belgium	1	1	2	4
34	Costa Rica	1	1	0	2
35	Ecuador	1	0	2	3
35	Nigeria	1	0	2	3
37	Sri Lanka	1	0	1	2
38	Chile	1	0	0	1
38	Ethiopia	1	0	0	1
38	Hungary	1	0	0	1
38	Ireland	1	0	0	1
38	Jordan	1	0	0	1
38	Malaysia	1	0	0	1
38	Norway	1	0	0	1
38	Pakistan	1	0	0	1
46	Argentina	0	2	3	5
47	Croatia	0	2	2	4
48	Bulgaria	0	2	0	2
49	Latvia	0	1	2	3
50	Iraq	0	1	1	2
50	Kuwait	0	1	1	2
50	Namibia	0	1	1	2
50	United Arab Emirates	0	1	1	2
54	Serbia	0	1	0	1
55	Czech Republic	0	0	2	2
56	Belarus	0	0	1	1
56	Denmark	0	0	1	1
56	Indonesia	0	0	1	1
56	Kenya	0	0	1	1
56	Oman	0	0	1	1
56	Portugal	0	0	1	1
56	Qatar	0	0	1	1
56	Saudi Arabia	0	0	1	1
56	Slovakia	0	0	1	1
56	Uganda	0	0	1	1
Totals (65 entries)		167	168	166	501

== See also ==
- Athletics at the 2020 Summer Olympics
