= Athletics at the 2020 Summer Paralympics – Men's 5000 metres =

Athletics – Men's 5000 metres at the XVI Paralympic Games
- Dates: 27 – 28 August 2024
- Competitors: 38

The Men's 5000m athletics events for the 2020 Summer Paralympics took place at the Tokyo National Stadium from August 27 to August 28, 2021. A total of 3 events were contested over this distance.

== Schedule ==
R	Round 1	½	Semifinals	F	Final

Date	Fri 27		Sat 28	
Event	M	E	M	E
T11 5000m	F			
T13 5000m			F	
T54 5000m		R		F

== Medal summary ==
The following is a summary of the medals awarded across all 5000 metres events.

Classification	Gold		Silver		Bronze	
T11	Yeltsin Jacques; Brazil	15:13.62 AR	Kenya Karasawa; Japan	15:18.12	Shinya Wada; Japan	15:21.03
T13	Yassine Ouhdadi El Ataby; Spain	14:34.13 AR	Jaryd Clifford; Australia	14:35.52 AR	Aleksandr Kostin; RPC	14:37.42 PB
T54	Marcel Hug; Switzerland	10:29.90	Brent Lakatos; Canada	10:30.19	Putharet Khongrak; Thailand	10:30.37

== Results ==
The following were the results of the finals only of each of the Men's 5000 metres events in each of the classifications. Further details of each event, including where appropriate heats and semi finals results, are available on that event's dedicated page.

=== T11 ===
The T11 category is for athletes with a visual impairment. A T11 athlete may be entirely without sight, or be able to perceive light, but have no ability to see the shape of a hand at any distance. T11 athletes commonly run with guides.

The final in this classification took place on 27 August 2021, at 9:35:

Rank	Athlete	Nation	Time	Notes
1st place, gold medalist(s)	Yeltsin Jacques	Brazil	15:13.62	AR
2nd place, silver medalist(s)	Kenya Karasawa	Japan	15:18.12	
3rd place, bronze medalist(s)	Shinya Wada	Japan	15:21.03	
4	Rodgers Kiprop	Kenya	15:27.06	PB
5	Rosbil Guillen	Peru	15:35.82	PB
6	Fedor Rudakovo	RPC	15:48.53	
7	Darwin Castro	Ecuador	15:49.60	SB
8	Júlio César Agripino	Brazil	16:26.31	
9	Cristian Valenzuela	Chile	17:15.14	
10	Wilson Bii	Kenya	17:31.73	

=== T13 ===
The T13 category is for athletes with a moderate visual impairment. Athletes in this category have a variety of visual impairments, but can typically recognize contours from a distance of 2 to 6 metres. Athletes in this category do not typically require a guide.

The final in this classification took place on 28 August 2021, at 9:40:

Rank	Name	Nationality	Time	Notes
1st place, gold medalist(s)	Yassine Ouhdadi El Ataby	Spain	14:34.13	AR
2nd place, silver medalist(s)	Jaryd Clifford	Australia	14:35.52	AR
3rd place, bronze medalist(s)	Aleksandr Kostin	RPC	14:37.42	PB
4	David Devine	Great Britain	14:38.00	SB
5	Guillaume Ouellet	Canada	14:47.47	
6	Wajdi Boukhili	Tunisia	16:00.15	
DNF	El Amin Chentouf	Morocco		
DNS	Hatem Nasrallah	Tunisia		

=== T54 ===
The T54 category is for wheelchair athletes with no leg function, but near full arm function and reasonable to normal trunk function. Typically this may be caused by a lower spinal cord injury or spinal cord birth defect.

The final in this classification took place on 28 August 2021, at 20:24:

Rank	Athlete	Nation	Time	Notes
1st place, gold medalist(s)	Marcel Hug	Switzerland	10:29.90	
2nd place, silver medalist(s)	Brent Lakatos	Canada	10:30.19	
3rd place, bronze medalist(s)	Putharet Khongrak	Thailand	10:30.37	
4	Daniel Romanchuk	United States	10:30.50	
5	Alexey Bychenok	RPC	10:30.59	
6	Prawat Wahoram	Thailand	10:30.59	
7	Zhang Yong	China	10:30.82	
8	Masayuki Higuchi	Japan	10:31.28	
9	Dai Yunqiang	China	10:33.25	
	Julien Casoli	France	DNF	
