= 2019 World Para Athletics Championships – Men's 5000 metres =

The men's 5000 metres at the 2019 World Para Athletics Championships was held in Dubai on 13 November (T54) and 14 November 2019 (T11 and T13).

== Medalists ==
Event	Gold		Silver		Bronze	
T11 details	Samwel Mushai Kimani; Guide: James Boit; Kenya	15:45.32 SB	Fedor Rudakov; Guide: Vladimir Miasnikov; Russia	15:46.74 PB	Kenya Karasawa; Guides: Hiroaki Mogi, Kazuaki Hoshino; Japan	15:48.21
T13 details	Jaryd Clifford; Guides: Tim Logan, Philo Saunders; Australia	14:40.40 AR	Yassine Ouhdadi el Ataby; Spain	14:42.12 AR	Aleksandr Kostin; Russia	14:42.62 PB
T54 details	Prawat Wahoram; Thailand	10:33.00	Marcel Hug; Switzerland	10:33.10	Zhang Yong; China	10:33.39
WR world record | AR area record | CR championship record | GR games record | NR national record | OR Olympic record | PB personal best | SB season best | WL world leading (in a given season)

== T11 ==
=== Records ===
World record	Henry Wanyoike (KEN)	15:11.07	Athens, Greece	24 September 2004
Championship record	Odair Santos (BRA)	15:16.87	Christchurch, New Zealand	27 January 2011

=== Schedule ===
Date	Time	Round
14 November	9:09	Final

=== Final ===
The final was started on 14 November at 9:09.

Rank	Order	Sport Class	Name	Nationality	Time	Notes
1st place, gold medalist(s)	11	T11	Samwel Mushai Kimani; Guide: James Boit	Kenya	15:45.32	SB
2nd place, silver medalist(s)	1	T11	Fedor Rudakov; Guide: Vladimir Miasnikov	Russia	15:46.74	PB
3rd place, bronze medalist(s)	2	T11	Kenya Karasawa; Guides: Hiroaki Mogi, Kazuaki Hoshino	Japan	15:48.21	
4	4	T11	Guillen Rosbil; Guides: Carlos Miguel Guevara Cayo, Cereceda Ferdinan	Peru	15:54.22	PB
5	10	T11	Darwin Gustavo Castro Reyes; Guide: Diego Patricio Arevalo Vizhnay	Ecuador	15:59.99	
6	9	T11	Julio Cesar Agripino dos Santos; Guides: Lutimar Abreu Paes, Guilherme A. dos Anjos Santos	Brazil	16:08.92	SB
7	3	T11	Wilson Bii; Guide: Erick Kirui	Kenya	16:10.21	
8	7	T11	Rodgers Kiprop; Guide: Malinga Kisa	Kenya	18:37.44	
	6	T11	Manuel Garnica; Guide: Hassan Daniel Izzeddine Yelmo	Spain	DNF	
	8	T11	Hasan Hüseyin Kaçar; Guide: Yahya Agac	Turkey	DNF	
	12	T11	Aleksander Kossakowski; Guide: Krzysztof Wasilewski	Poland	DNF	
	5	T11	Shinya Wada; Guide: Takashi Nakata	Japan	DQ	R 7.10

== T13 ==
=== Records ===
T12	World record	El Amin Chentouf (MAR)	13:53.76	London, United Kingdom	3 September 2012
T12	Championship record	Bernard Koskei (KEN)	14:24.48	London, United Kingdom	16 July 2017
T13	World record	Youssef Benibrahim (MAR)	14:20.69	London, United Kingdom	16 July 2017
T13	Championship record	Youssef Benibrahim (MAR)	14:20.69	London, United Kingdom	16 July 2017

=== Schedule ===
Date	Time	Round
14 November	20:15	Final

=== Final ===
The final was started on 14 November at 20:19.

Rank	Order	Sport Class	Name	Nationality	Time	Notes
1st place, gold medalist(s)	3	T12	Jaryd Clifford; Guides: Tim Logan, Philo Saunders	Australia	14:40.40	AR
2nd place, silver medalist(s)	1	T13	Yassine Ouhdadi el Ataby	Spain	14:42.12	AR
3rd place, bronze medalist(s)	9	T12	Aleksandr Kostin	Russia	14:42.62	PB
4	2	T13	Guillaume Ouellet	Canada	14:45.63	SB
5	6	T13	Serhii Bereziuk	Ukraine	14:48.87	PB
6	12	T12	Hicham Hanyn	Morocco	14:50.52	PB
7	7	T12	El Amin Chentouf	Morocco	14:52.64	SB
8	4	T12	Alberto Suárez Laso	Spain	14:54.30	SB
9	8	T13	Noah Scherf	United States	15:33.31	
10	10	T12	Sixto Roman Moreta Criollo; Guide: Richard Alexander Jerez Pilco	Ecuador	16:19.16	
	5	T13	Youssef Benibrahim	Morocco	DNF	
	11	T12	Rouay Jebabli	Tunisia	DNF	

== T54 ==
=== Records ===
World record	Daniel Romanchuk (USA)	9:42.83	Arbon, Switzerland	2 June 2019
Championship record	Marcel Hug (SUI)	10:20.16	Lyon, France	24 July 2013

=== Schedule ===
Date	Time	Round
13 November	10:11	Round 1
13 November	19:55	Final

=== Round 1 ===
First 3 of each heat (Q) and the next 1 fastest (q) advance to the final.

Rank	Heat	Order	Sport Class	Name	Nationality	Time	Notes
1	2	5	T54	Daniel Romanchuk	United States	10:33.56	Q
2	2	1	T54	Prawat Wahoram	Thailand	10:33.61	Q
3	2	7	T54	Dai Yunqiang	China	10:34.86	Q
4	2	6	T54	Julien Casoli	France	10:34.95	q
5	2	2	T54	Jake Lappin	Australia	10:35.12	
6	2	3	T54	Faisal Alrajehi	Kuwait	10:35.44	
7	2	4	T54	Kozo Kubo	Japan	10:35.59	
8	1	6	T54	Zhang Yong	China	10:48.51	Q
9	1	5	T54	Putharet Khongrak	Thailand	10:48.85	Q
10	1	1	T54	Aaron Pike	United States	10:49.32	Q
11	1	3	T54	Masayuki Higuchi	Japan	10:49.42	
12	1	4	T54	Alexey Bychenok	Russia	10:49.46	
13	1	2	T54	Badir Abbas Alhosani	United Arab Emirates	10:51.00	
14	1	7	T54	Josh Cassidy	Canada	10:54.09	
15	3	2	T54	Jin Hua	China	11:14.03	Q
16	3	1	T54	Marcel Hug	Switzerland	11:14.04	Q
17	3	6	T54	Rawat Tana	Thailand	11:14.23	Q
18	3	3	T54	Alhassane Baldé	Germany	11:14.60	
19	3	4	T54	Joshua George	United States	11:15.33	
20	3	5	T54	Sho Watanabe	Japan	11:15.39	
	3	7	T54	Brent Lakatos	Canada	DNS	

=== Final ===
The final was started on 13 November at 19:55.

Rank	Order	Sport Class	Name	Nationality	Time	Notes
1st place, gold medalist(s)	2	T54	Prawat Wahoram	Thailand	10:33.00	
2nd place, silver medalist(s)	3	T54	Marcel Hug	Switzerland	10:33.10	
3rd place, bronze medalist(s)	5	T54	Zhang Yong	China	10:33.39	
4	8	T54	Daniel Romanchuk	United States	10:33.55	
5	9	T54	Putharet Khongrak	Thailand	10:33.60	
6	4	T54	Rawat Tana	Thailand	10:34.33	
7	1	T54	Jin Hua	China	10:34.76	SB
8	6	T54	Aaron Pike	United States	10:36.08	
9	10	T54	Julien Casoli	France	10:36.39	
10	7	T54	Dai Yunqiang	China	10:46.74	

== See also ==
- List of IPC world records in athletics
