= Athletics at the 2020 Summer Paralympics – Men's 5000 metres T13 =

Men's 5000 metres T13 at the XVI Paralympic Games
- Venue: Tokyo National Stadium
- Dates: 28 August 2021 (final)
- Competitors: 8 from 7 nations
- Winning time: 14:34.13

Medalists
1st place, gold medalist(s)		Yassine Ouhdadi El Ataby	Spain
2nd place, silver medalist(s)		Jaryd Clifford	Australia
3rd place, bronze medalist(s)		Aleksandr Kostin	RPC

The men's 5000 metres T13 event at the 2020 Summer Paralympics in Tokyo took place on 28 August 2021.

The T13 category is for athletes with a moderate visual impairment. Athletes in this category have a variety of visual impairments, but can typically recognize contours from a distance of 2 to 6 metres. Athletes in this category do not typically require a guide.

== Records ==
Prior to the competition, the existing records were as follows:

World Record	Youssef Benibrahim (MAR)	14:20.69	London, United Kingdom	16 July 2017
Paralympic Record	Bilel Aloui (TUN)	14:33.33	Rio de Janeiro, Brazil	15 September 2016

Area	Time	Athlete	Nation
Africa	14:20.69 WR	Youssef Benibrahim	Morocco
America	14:23.24	Guillaume Ouellet	Canada
Asia	15:44.29	Toshiharu Takai	Japan
Europe	14:42.12	Yassine Ouhdadi El Ataby	Spain
Oceania	15:31.61	Tim Prendergast	New Zealand

== Results ==
=== Final ===
The final took place on 28 August, at 9:40:

Rank	Name	Nationality	Class	Time	Notes
1st place, gold medalist(s)	Yassine Ouhdadi El Ataby	Spain	T13	14:34.13	AR
2nd place, silver medalist(s)	Jaryd Clifford	Australia	T12	14:35.52	AR
3rd place, bronze medalist(s)	Aleksandr Kostin; Iurii Kloptcov (Guide)	RPC	T12	14:37.42	PB
4	David Devine	Great Britain	T12	14:38.00	SB
5	Guillaume Ouellet	Canada	T13	14:47.47	
6	Wajdi Boukhili	Tunisia	T12	16:00.15	
DNF	El Amin Chentouf	Morocco	T12		
DNS	Hatem Nasrallah	Tunisia	T12		
