= Athletics at the 2016 Summer Paralympics – Men's 5000 metres T13 =

Men's 5000 metres T13 at the XV Paralympic Games
- Venue: Estádio Olímpico João Havelange
- Dates: 15 September 2016
- Competitors: 12 from 9 nations

Medalists
1st place, gold medalist(s)		Henry Kirwa	Kenya
2nd place, silver medalist(s)		El Amin Chentouf	Morocco
3rd place, bronze medalist(s)		Bilel Aloui	Tunisia

The T13 category is for athletes with a moderate visual impairment. Athletes in this category have a variety of visual impairments, but can typically recognize contours from a distance of 2 to 6 metres. Athletes in this category do not typically require a guide.

The Athletics at the 2016 Summer Paralympics – Men's 5000 metres T13 event at the 2016 Paralympic Games took place on 15 September 2016, at the Estádio Olímpico João Havelange.

== Final ==
10:00 15 September 2016:

Rank	Lane	Bib	Name	Nationality	Reaction	Time	Notes
1st place, gold medalist(s)	3	1763	Henry Kirwa	Kenya		14:17.32	
2nd place, silver medalist(s)	8	1850	El Amin Chentouf	Morocco		14:21.04	
3rd place, bronze medalist(s)	10	2270	Bilel Aloui	Tunisia		14:33.33	
4	7	1211	Guillaume Ouellet	Canada		14:54.07	
5	9	1147	Yeltsin Jacques	Brazil		15:02.13	
6	6	1849	Youssef Benibrahim	Morocco		15:06.63	
7	11	1047	Jaryd Clifford	Australia		15:06.64	
8	1	2349	Chaz Davis	United States		15:15.86	
9	12	2276	Bilel Hammami	Tunisia		15:15.90	
10	4	2038	Lukasz Wietecki	Poland		15:36.04	
	2	1135	Julio Cesar Agripino dos Santos	Brazil			DSQ
	5	1423	Gustavo Nieves	Spain			DSQ
