= Athletics at the 2020 Summer Paralympics – Men's 1500 metres T13 =

Men's 1500 metres T13 at the XVI Paralympic Games
- Venue: Tokyo National Stadium
- Dates: 31 August 2021 (final)
- Competitors: 11 from 7 nations
- Winning time: 3:54.04

Medalists
| 1st place, gold medalist(s) | | Anton Kuliatin | RPC |
| 2nd place, silver medalist(s) | | Rouay Jebabli | Tunisia |
| 3rd place, bronze medalist(s) | | Jaryd Clifford | Australia |

The men's 1500 metres T13 event at the 2020 Summer Paralympics in Tokyo took place on 31 August 2021.

The T13 category is for athletes with a moderate visual impairment. Athletes in this category have a variety of visual impairments, but can typically recognize contours from a distance of 2 to 6 metres. Athletes in this category do not typically require a guide.

== Records ==
Prior to the competition, the existing records were as follows:

| World Record | Abdellatif Baka (ALG) | 3:48.29 | Rio de Janeiro, Brazil | 11 September 2016 |
| Paralympic Record | Abdellatif Baka (ALG) | 3:48.29 | Rio de Janeiro, Brazil | 11 September 2016 |

| Area | Time | Athlete | Nation |
|---|---|---|---|
| Africa | 3:48.29 WR | Abdellatif Baka | Algeria |
| America | 3:56.76 | Lázaro Rashid Aguilar | Cuba |
| Asia | 4:03.94 | Fakhriddin Khamraev | Uzbekistan |
| Europe | 3:49.72 | Egor Sharov | Russia |
| Oceania | 3:51.82 | Tim Prendergast | New Zealand |

== Results ==
The final took place on 31 August 2021, at 9:48:

| Rank | Name | Nationality | Class | Time | Notes |
|---|---|---|---|---|---|
| 1st place, gold medalist(s) | Anton Kuliatin | RPC | T12 | 3:54.04 | |
| 2nd place, silver medalist(s) | Rouay Jebabli | Tunisia | T12 | 3:54.55 | PB |
| 3rd place, bronze medalist(s) | Jaryd Clifford | Australia | T12 | 3:54.69 | |
| 4 | Aleksandr Kostin | RPC | T12 | 3:55.57 | |
| 5 | Egor Sharov | RPC | T13 | 3:56.36 | |
| 6 | Yassine Ouhdadi El Ataby | Spain | T13 | 3:56.73 | |
| 7 | Tamiru Demisse | Ethiopia | T13 | 3:59.08 | |
| 8 | Abdellatif Baka | Algeria | T13 | 3:59.56 | SB |
| 9 | Achraf Lahouel | Tunisia | T12 | 3:59.99 | SB |
| 10 | Joel Gomez | United States | T13 | 4:02.41 | |
| 11 | Sam Harding | Australia | T12 | 4:05.13 | |
