= Athletics at the 2020 Summer Paralympics – Men's 1500 metres T11 =

Men's 1500 metres T11 at the XVI Paralympic Games
- Venue: Tokyo National Stadium
- Dates: 30 August 2021 (heats); 31 August 2021 (final)
- Competitors: 11 from 8 nations
- Winning time: 3:57.60

Medalists
1st place, gold medalist(s)		Yeltsin Jacques	Brazil
2nd place, silver medalist(s)		Shinya Wada	Japan
3rd place, bronze medalist(s)		Fedor Rudakov	RPC

The men's 1500 metres T11 event at the 2020 Summer Paralympics in Tokyo took place between 30 and 31 August 2021.

The T11 category is for athletes with a visual impairment. A T11 athlete may be entirely without sight, or be able to perceive light, but have no ability to see the shape of a hand at any distance. T11 athletes commonly run with guides.

== Records ==
Prior to the competition, the existing records were as follows:

World record	Samwel Mushai Kimani (KEN)	3:58.37	London, United Kingdom	3 September 2012
Paralympic record	Samwel Mushai Kimani (KEN)	3:58.37	London, United Kingdom	3 September 2012

Area	Time	Athlete	Nation
Africa	3:58.37 WR	Samwel Mushai Kimani	Kenya
America	4:03.66	Odair Santos	Brazil
Asia	4:05.75	Shinya Wada	Japan
Europe	4:05.11	Robert Matthews	Great Britain
Oceania	4:25.81	Gerrard Gosens	Australia

== Results ==
=== Heats ===
Heat 1 took place on 30 August 2021, at 9:48:

Rank	Name	Nationality	Time	Notes
1	Yeltsin Jacques	Brazil	4:07.34	Q
2	Shinya Wada	Japan	4:07.96	Q, SB
3	Fedor Rudakov	RPC	4:11.88	q
4	Wilson Bii	Kenya	4:18.59	
5	Aleksander Kossakowski	Poland	4:29.92	

Heat 2 took place on 30 August 2021, at 9:58:

Rank	Name	Nationality	Time	Notes
1	Kenya Karasawa	Japan	4:13.32	Q
2	Darwin Castro	Ecuador	4:13.74	Q
3	Cristian Valenzuela	Chile	4:14.85	q, SB
4	Rosbil Guillen	Peru	4:19.49	SB
5	Erick Kiptoo Sang	Kenya	4:32.73	qR
	Júlio César Agripino	Brazil	DQ	WPA 18.2b

=== Final ===
The final took place on 31 August 2021, at 9:38:

Rank	Name	Nationality	Time	Notes
1st place, gold medalist(s)	Yeltsin Jacques	Brazil	3:57.60	WR
2nd place, silver medalist(s)	Shinya Wada	Japan	4:05.27	AR
3rd place, bronze medalist(s)	Fedor Rudakov	RPC	4:05.55	PB
4	Kenya Karasawa	Japan	4:08.84	SB
5	Darwin Castro	Ecuador	4:10.24	PB
6	Erick Kiptoo Sang	Kenya	4:21.53	
7	Cristian Valenzuela	Chile	4:30.04	
