= Athletics at the 2020 Summer Paralympics – Men's 5000 metres T11 =

Men's 5000 metres T11 at the XVI Paralympic Games
- Venue: Tokyo National Stadium
- Dates: 27 August 2021 (final)
- Competitors: 10 from 7 nations
- Winning time: 15:13.62

Medalists
1st place, gold medalist(s)		Yeltsin Jacques	Brazil
2nd place, silver medalist(s)		Kenya Karasawa	Japan
3rd place, bronze medalist(s)		Shinya Wada	Japan

The men's 5000 metres T11 event at the 2020 Summer Paralympics in Tokyo took place on 27 August 2021.

The T11 category is for athletes with a visual impairment. A T11 athlete may be entirely without sight, or be able to perceive light, but have no ability to see the shape of a hand at any distance. T11 athletes commonly run with guides.

== Records ==
Prior to the competition, the existing records were as follows:

World record	Henry Wanyoike (KEN)	15:11.07	Athens, Greece	24 September 2004
Paralympic record	Henry Wanyoike (KEN)	15:11.07	Athens, Greece	24 September 2004

Area	Time	Athlete	Nation
Africa	15:11.07 WR	Henry Wanyoike	Kenya
America	15:16.82	Odair Santos	Brazil
Asia	15:11.79	Shinya Wada	Japan
Europe	15:43.34	Robert Matthews	Great Britain
Oceania	17:29.33	Gerrard Gosens	Australia

== Results ==
The final took place at 09:35.

Rank	Athlete	Nation	Time	Notes
1st place, gold medalist(s)	Yeltsin Jacques	Brazil	15:13.62	AR
2nd place, silver medalist(s)	Kenya Karasawa	Japan	15:18.12	
3rd place, bronze medalist(s)	Shinya Wada	Japan	15:21.03	
4	Rodgers Kiprop	Kenya	15:27.06	PB
5	Rosbil Guillen	Peru	15:35.82	PB
6	Darwin Castro	Ecuador	15:49.60	
7	Júlio César Agripino	Brazil	16:26.31	SB
8	Cristian Valenzuela; Guide: Matías Andrés Silva	Chile	17:15.14	
9	Wilson Bii	Kenya	17:31.73	
	Fedor Rudakov; Guide: Vladimir Miasnikov	RPC	DQ	WPA 7.9.3
