= 2023 World Para Athletics Championships – Men's 5000 metres =

The men's 5000 metres events at the 2023 World Para Athletics Championships was held across 3 classifications at Charlety Stadium, Paris, France, on 10 July.

== Medalists ==
Event	Gold		Silver		Bronze	
T11	Kenya Karasawa; Japan	11:05.19	Julio Agripino; Brazil	15:07.21	Yeltsin Jacques; Brazil	15:12.37
T13	Yassine Ouhdadi; Spain	15:16.97	Jaryd Clifford; Australia	15:18.23	Guillaume Ouellet; Canada	15:22.85
T54	Marcel Hug; Switzerland	9:35.78	Prawat Wahoram; Thailand	10:15.31	Daniel Sidbury; United Kingdom	10:15.44

== T11 ==
=== Final ===
The final took place on 10 July.

Rank	Lane	Name	Nationality	Time	Notes
1st place, gold medalist(s)	3	Kenya Karasawa	Japan	15:05.19	CR
2nd place, silver medalist(s)	1	Júlio Agripino	Brazil	15:07.21	AR
3rd place, bronze medalist(s)	7	Yeltsin Jacques	Brazil	15:12.37	PB
4	6	Shinya Wada	Japan	15:26.95	
5	2	Wilson Bii	Kenya	15:35.78	SB
6	8	Jimmy Caicedo	Ecuador	15:36.57	PB
7	5	Erick Kiptoo Sang	Kenya	16:06.32	
8	4	Luis Sandoval	Peru	16:15.39	SB

== T13 ==
=== Final ===
The final took place on 10 July.

Rank	Lane	Name	Nationality	Time	Notes
1st place, gold medalist(s)	1	Yassine Ouhdadi	Spain	15:16.97	
2nd place, silver medalist(s)	7	Jaryd Clifford	Australia	15:18.23	
3rd place, bronze medalist(s)	4	Guillaume Ouellet	Canada	15:22.85	
4	3	Oussama Hmimsa	Morocco	15:25.51	SB
5	6	John Lokedi	Kenya	15:25.67	
6	5	Alberto Suárez Laso	Spain	15:29.75	SB
	2	Mikail Al	Turkey	DNF	

== T54 ==
=== Final ===
The final took place on 10 July.

Rank	Lane	Name	Nationality	Time	Notes
1st place, gold medalist(s)	5	Marcel Hug	Switzerland	9:35.78	CR
2nd place, silver medalist(s)	3	Prawat Wahoram	Thailand	10:15.31	
3rd place, bronze medalist(s)	1	Daniel Sidbury	Great Britain	10:15.44	
4	9	Faisal Alrajehi	Kuwait	10:15.65	
5	10	Putharet Khongrak	Thailand	10:16.25	
6	6	Julien Casoli	France	10:18.14	
7	7	Kozo Kubo	Japan	10:19.47	
8	4	Thibault Daurat	France	10:20.79	
9	2	Badir Abbas Alhosani	United Arab Emirates	10:21.50	
10	8	Samuel Rizzo	Australia	10:25.36	
