= Tunisia at the 2020 Summer Paralympics =

- Flag of Tunisia
- IPC code: TUN
- NPC: Tunisian Paralympic Committee

in Tokyo, Japan August 24, 2021 – September 5, 2021
- Competitors: 25 in 3 sports
- Flag bearers: Raoua Tlili; Walid Ktila
- Medals: Gold 4 Silver 5 Bronze 2 Total 11

Summer Paralympics appearances (overview)
- 1988; 1992; 1996; 2000; 2004; 2008; 2012; 2016; 2020; 2024

Tunisia competed in the 2020 Summer Paralympics in Tokyo, Japan from 24 August to 5 September, 2021.

== Medalists ==
Medal	Name	Sport	Event	Date
Gold	Raoua Tlili	Athletics	Women's shot put F41	27 August
Gold	Walid Ktila	Athletics	Men's 100 metres T34	30 August
Gold	Raoua Tlili	Athletics	Women's discus throw F41	1 September
Gold	Walid Ktila	Athletics	Men's 800 metres T34	4 September
Silver	Ahmed Ben Moslah	Athletics	Men's shot put F37	27 August
Silver	Rouay Jebabli	Athletics	Men's 1500 metres T13	31 August
Silver	Yassine Guenichi	Athletics	Men's shot put F36	31 August
Silver	Mohamed Farhat Chida	Athletics	Men's 400 metres T38	31 August
Silver	Rima Abdelli	Athletics	Women's shot put F40	4 September
Bronze	Somaya Bousaid	Athletics	Women's 1500 metres T13	28 August
Bronze	Rouay Jebabli	Athletics	Men's 400 metres T12	2 September

== Competitors ==
The following is the list of number of competitors participating in the Games:

#	Sport	Men	Women	Total	Events
1	Athletics	10	13	23	34
2	Table tennis	1	0	1	1
3	Triathlon	1	0	1	1
Total		12	13	25	36

== Athletics ==
23 people in 34 events such as Rima Abdelli, Walid Ktila, Mohamed Farhat Chida, Yassine Gharbi, Sonia Mansour, Raoua Tlili and Hania Aidi are among the athletes to represent Tunisia at the 2020 Summer Paralympics.

Number	Athlete	Event	Heats		Final	
Number	Athlete	Event	Result	Rank	Result	Rank
Men's Track
1	Mohamed Farhat Chida	Men's 100m T38	11.64	8 Q	11.63	7
2	Mohamed Farhat Chida	Men's 400m T38	54.67	3 Q	50.33	2nd place, silver medalist(s)
3	Walid Ktila	Men's 100m T34	—N/a		15.01 PR	1st place, gold medalist(s)
4	Walid Ktila	Men's 800m T34	1:46.59	1 Q		
5	Achref Lahouel	Men's 400m T12	DQ WPA 18.5a	-	did not advance	
6	Achref Lahouel	Men's 1500m T12	—N/a		3:59.99	9
7	Rouay Jebabli	Men's 400m T12	48.69 PB	3 Q	48.01 PB	3rd place, bronze medalist(s)
8	Rouay Jebabli	Men's 1500m T12	—N/a		3:54.55 PB	2nd place, silver medalist(s)
9	Wajdi Boukhili	Men's 5000m T12	—N/a		16:00.15	6
10	Wajdi Boukhili	Men's Marathon T12	-			
11	Hatem Nasrallah	Men's 5000m T12	—N/a		DNF	-
12	Hatem Nasrallah	Men's Marathon T12	-			
Men's Field
13	Abdennacer Feidi	Men's shot put F32	—N/a		8.82	8
14	Abdennacer Feidi	Men's Club Throw F32	—N/a		30.24	10
15	Faouzi Rzig	Men's Javelin Throw F34	—N/a		.31.12	8
16	Ahmed Ben Moslah	Men's shot put F37	—N/a		14.5 AR	2nd place, silver medalist(s)
17	Yassine Guenichi	Men's shot put F36	—N/a		15.12	2nd place, silver medalist(s)
18	Mohamed Farhat Chida	Men's Long Jump T38	—N/a		6.36	6
Women's Track
19	Soumaya Bousaid	Women's 1500m T13	4:52.04	6 Q	4:31.78	3rd place, bronze medalist(s)
20	Sonia Mansour	Women's 400m T38	1:04.73	5	Did Not Advance	
Women's Field
21	Rima Abdelli	Women's shot put F40	—N/a			
22	Nourhein Belhaj Salem	Women's shot put F40	—N/a			
23	Raja Jebali	Women's shot put F40	—N/a			
24	Yousra ben Jemaa	Women's javelin throw F34	—N/a		16.04	4
25	Saoussen Ben Mbarek	Women's javelin throw F34	—N/a		13.00 PB	8
26	Saoussen Ben Mbarek	Women's shot put F34	—N/a		5.96	9
27	Raoua Tlili	Women's discus throw F41	—N/a		37.91 WR	1st place, gold medalist(s)
28	Raoua Tlili	Women's shot put F41	—N/a		10.55 WR	1st place, gold medalist(s)
29	Samar Ben Koelleb	Women's discus throw F41	—N/a		26.02	7
30	Samar Ben Koelleb	Women's shot put F41	—N/a		9.18 PB	4
31	Fathia Amaimia	Women's discus throw F41	—N/a		29.04 PB	4
32	Fadhila Nafati	Women's shot put F54	—N/a		5.66	8
33	Dhouha Chelhi	Women's club throw F51	—N/a		11.90	7
34	Bochra Rzouga	Women's discus throw F53	—N/a		10.77	9

== Table tennis ==
One male competitor has been selected to compete in the Paralympics after winning in the African Para Table Tennis Championships in Alexandria. This will be the first time that Tunisia will be competing in table tennis at the Games.

Athlete	Event	Preliminaries		
Athlete	Event	Opposition Result	Opposition Result	Rank
Karim Gharsallah	Men's singles C11	Lucas Creange (FRA) L 0-3	Eduardo Martinez Cuesta (ESP) L 0-3	9

== Triathlon ==
Athlete	Event	Final	
Athlete	Event	Result	Rank
Fathi Zwoukhi	Men's PTWC	1:05:44	8

== See also ==
- Tunisia at the Paralympics
- Tunisia at the 2020 Summer Olympics
