= Canada at the 2020 Summer Paralympics =

- Flag of Canada
- IPC code: CAN
- NPC: Canadian Paralympic Committee
- Website: www.paralympic.ca

in Tokyo, Japan August 24, 2021 – September 5, 2021
- Competitors: 128 in 18 sports
- Flag bearer (opening): Priscilla Gagné
- Flag bearer (closing): Brent Lakatos
- Coaches: 113 (coaches and staff)
- Medals Ranked 23rd: Gold 5 Silver 10 Bronze 6 Total 21

Summer Paralympics appearances (overview)
- 1968; 1972; 1976; 1980; 1984; 1988; 1992; 1996; 2000; 2004; 2008; 2012; 2016; 2020; 2024

Canada competed at the 2020 Summer Paralympics in Tokyo, Japan, from 24 August to 5 September 2021.

On August 8, 2021, the Canadian Paralympic Committee announced the final team of 128 athletes (57 men and 71 women) competing in 128 sports. A total of 113 coaches and support staff will also accompany the team.

On August 21, 2021, judoka Priscilla Gagné was announced as Canada's flagbearer during the opening ceremony.

== Medallists ==
Medal	Name	Sport	Event	Date
Gold	Aurélie Rivard	Swimming	Women's 100 m freestyle S10	28 August
Gold	Greg Stewart	Athletics	Men's shot put F46	1 September
Gold	Aurélie Rivard	Swimming	Women's 400 m freestyle S10	1 September
Gold	Danielle Dorris	Swimming	Women's 50 metre butterfly S7	3 September
Gold	Nate Riech	Athletics	Men's 1500 metres T38	4 September
Silver	Tristen Chernove	Cycling	Men's individual pursuit C1	26 August
Silver	Nicolas-Guy Turbide	Swimming	Men's 100 m backstroke S13	26 August
Silver	Kate O'Brien	Cycling	Women's time trial C4–5	27 August
Silver	Priscilla Gagné	Judo	Women's 52 kg	27 August
Silver	Brent Lakatos	Athletics	Men's 5000 m T54	28 August
Silver	Brent Lakatos	Athletics	Men's 400 m T53	29 August
Silver	Danielle Dorris	Swimming	Women's 100 m backstroke S7	30 August
Silver	Brent Lakatos	Athletics	Men's 100 m T53	1 September
Silver	Aurélie Rivard	Swimming	Women's 100 metre backstroke S10	2 September
Silver	Brent Lakatos	Athletics	Men's 800 metres T53	2 September
Bronze	Keely Shaw	Cycling	Women's individual pursuit C4	25 August
Bronze	Aurélie Rivard	Swimming	Women's 50 m freestyle S10	25 August
Bronze	Stefan Daniel	Paratriathlon	Men's PTS5	29 August
Bronze	Morgan Bird; Katarina Roxon; Sabrina Duchesne; Aurélie Rivard	Swimming	Women's 34pts 4x100m relay	29 August
Bronze	Zachary Gingras	Athletics	Men's 400 m T38	31 August
Bronze	Marissa Papaconstantinou	Athletics	Women's 100 metres T64	3 September

== Competitors ==
The following is the list of athletes per sport/discipline.

Sport	Men	Women	Total
Archery	0	1	1
Athletics (track and field)	9	7	16
Badminton	0	1	1
Boccia	3	1	4
Cycling	5	4	9
Equestrian	0	4	4
Goalball	0	6	6
Judo	0	1	1
Paracanoeing	1	2	3
Paratriathlon	1	3	4
Rowing	3	4	7
Shooting	1	1	2
Sitting volleyball	0	11	11
Swimming	6	13	19
Wheelchair basketball	11	12	23
Wheelchair fencing	3	1	4
Wheelchair rugby	12	0	12
Wheelchair tennis	1	0	1
Total	57	71	128

== Archery ==
Canada qualified one female archer. Karen Van Nest qualified by winning silver at the Pan American Championships in Monterrey, Mexico. This will make her sixth appearance at the Paralympic Games.

Athlete	Event	Ranking round		Round of 32	Round of 16	Quarterfinals	Semifinals	Final / BM	
Athlete	Event	Score	Seed	Opposition Score	Opposition Score	Opposition Score	Opposition Score	Opposition Score	Rank
Karen Van Nest	Women's individual compound open	678	11	Nagano (JPN); W 138–130	Lin (CHN); L 140–142				

== Athletics (track and field) ==
Canada's track and field team of 16 athletes (nine men and seven women) was announced on July 30, 2021.

Men's track

Athlete	Event	Heats		Final	
Athlete	Event	Result	Rank	Result	Rank
Zachary Gingras	400m T38	51.81	3 Q	50.85	3rd place, bronze medalist(s)
Austin Ingram	100m T13	11.21	10	did not advance	
Brent Lakatos	100m T53	14.49	2 Q	14.55	2nd place, silver medalist(s)
Brent Lakatos	400m T53	48.00	2 Q	46.75 AR	2nd place, silver medalist(s)
Brent Lakatos	800m T53	1:42.29	6 Q	1:36.32	2nd place, silver medalist(s)
Brent Lakatos	1500m T53	3:03.72	15	did not advance	
Brent Lakatos	5000m T54	10:15.15	8 Q	10:30.19	2nd place, silver medalist(s)
Brent Lakatos	Marathon T54	—N/a		1:29.18	4
Thomas Normandeau	400m T47	50.33	7 Q	50.02	6
Guillaume Ouellet	5000m T13	—N/a		14:47.47	5
Nathan Riech	1500m T38	—N/a		3:58.92	1st place, gold medalist(s)
Austin Smeenk	100m T34	—N/a		15.92	7
Austin Smeenk	800m T34	1:46.99	5 Q	1:47.58	5
Liam Stanley	1500m T38	—N/a		4:06.95	5

Men's field

Athlete	Event	Final	
Athlete	Event	Result	Rank
Greg Stewart	Shot put F46	16.75 PR	1st place, gold medalist(s)

Women's track

Athlete	Event	Heats		Final	
Athlete	Event	Result	Rank	Result	Rank
Jessica Frotten
Jessica Frotten	400m T53	0:59.98	8	1:01.16	8
Jessica Frotten	800m T53	1:56.79	9	did not advance	
Jessica Frotten	1500m T53	3:52.23	13	did not advance	
Marissa Papaconstantinou	100m T64	13.22	4 Q	13.07	3rd place, bronze medalist(s)
Marissa Papaconstantinou	200m T64	27.22	5 Q	27.08	5

Women's field

Athlete	Event	Final	
Athlete	Event	Result	Rank
Charlotte Bolton	Discus throw F41	27.72	6
Charlotte Bolton	Shot put F41	8.73	6
Renee Foessel	Discus throw F38	32.23	4
Jennifer Brown	Discus throw F38	27.57	8
Sarah Mickey	Discus throw F55	22.49	6
Amy Watt	Long jump T47	5.28	5

== Badminton ==
Canada qualified one female badminton athlete. Olivia Meier qualified to compete in the women's singles SL4 event. The appearance will also mark Canada's debut in the sport at the Paralympics.

Athlete	Event	Group Stage				Quarterfinal	Semifinal	Final / BM	
Athlete	Event	Opposition Score	Opposition Score	Opposition Score	Rank	Opposition Score	Opposition Score	Opposition Score	Rank
Olivia Meier	Women's singles SL4	Srinavakul (THA); L 1–2 (20–22, 22–20, 13–21)	Sagøy (NOR); L 0–2 (6–21, 8–21)	Dransfield (AUS); W 1–2 (7–21, 21–13, 23–21)	3	Did not advance			

== Boccia ==
Canada qualified in BC4 & Individual BC2 events, they include Danik Allard, Iulian Ciobanu, Marco Dispaltro and Alison Levine.

Individual

Athlete	Event	Pool matches				Quarterfinals	Semifinals	Final / BM	
Athlete	Event	Opposition Score	Opposition Score	Opposition Score	Rank	Opposition Score	Opposition Score	Opposition Score	Rank
Danik Allard	Mixed individual BC2	Gonçalves (POR); L 4–8	Sugimura (JPN); L 4–6	Tsyplina (RPC); W 12–1	3	did not advance			
Iulian Ciobanu	Mixed individual BC4	Oliveira (POR); W 3–3	Lin (CHN); W 6–4	Zheng (CHN); L 2–8	2	did not advance			
Alison Levine	Mixed individual BC4	Streharsky (SVK); W 4–3	Lau (HKG); L 2–3	Streharsky (CRO); L 8–2	3	did not advance			

Pairs

Athlete	Event	Pool matches					Semifinals	Final / BM	
Athlete	Event	Opposition Score	Opposition Score	Opposition Score	Opposition Score	Rank	Opposition Score	Opposition Score	Rank
from Iulian Ciobanu; Marco Dispaltro; Alison Levine	Mixed pair BC4	Portugal (POR)	Brazil (BRA)	Great Britain (GBR)	Slovakia (SVK)				

== Cycling ==
Canada qualified a total of nine cyclists (five men and four women). Canada will compete in both disciplines (road and track), with four athletes Tristen Chernove, Ross Wilson, Kate O'Brien and Keely Shaw competing in both. The team was named on July 7, 2021. On August 30, 2021, Tristen Chernove withdrew from the Games after announcing his immediate retirement.

=== Road ===
Men

Athlete	Event	Time	Rank
Joey Desjardins	Road race H3	2:48:04	8
Alex Hyndman	Road race H3	3:00:50	11
Charles Moreau	Road race H3	2:59:47	10
Ross Wilson	Road race C1–3	DNF	
Joey Desjardins	Time trial H3	46:13.88	11
Alex Hyndman	Time trial H3	51:35.43	16
Charles Moreau	Time trial H3	47:00.95	12
Ross Wilson	Time trial C1	27:57.31	7

Women

Athlete	Event	Time	Rank
Keely Shaw	Road race C4–5	No Time	13
Marie-Ève Croteau	Road race T1–2	DNF	
Shelley Gautier	Road race T1–2	1:24.48	5
Kate O'Brien	Time trial C4	DNF	
Keely Shaw	Time trial C4	42:11.09	4
Marie-Ève Croteau	Time trial T1–2	39:45.55	6
Shelley Gautier	Time trial T1–2	41:07.32	8

=== Track ===
Pursuit

Athlete	Event	Qualification		Final	
Athlete	Event	Time	Rank	Opponent Results	Rank
Tristen Chernove	Men's individual pursuit C1	3:40.591	2 Q	Astashov (RPC); L Overlapped	2nd place, silver medalist(s)
Keely Shaw	Women's individual pursuit C4	3:49.032	3 QB	Lemon (AUS); W 3:48.342	3rd place, bronze medalist(s)

Time trial

Athlete	Event	Time	Rank
Tristen Chernove	Men's time trial C1–3	DNS	
Kate O'Brien	Women's time trial C4–5	35.439	2nd place, silver medalist(s)

== Equestrian ==
Canada qualified a team of four equestrians. The team was officially named on July 20, 2021.

Individual

Athlete	Horse	Event	Total	
Athlete	Horse	Event	Score	Rank
Lauren Barwick	Sandrino	Individual championship test grade III	70.000	9
Lauren Barwick	Sandrino	Individual freestyle test grade III	72.507	6
Winona Hartvikson	Onyx	Individual championship test grade I	69.893	9
Jody Schloss	Lieutenant Lobin	Individual championship test grade I	69.286	11
Roberta Sheffield	Fairuza	Individual championship test grade III	69.765	12

Team

Athlete	Horse	Event	Individual score	Total	
Athlete	Horse	Event	TT	Score	Rank
Lauren Barwick	See above	Team	70.235	211.699	10
Winona Hartvikson	See above	Team	69.464	211.699	10
Roberta Sheffield	See above	Team	72.000	211.699	10

== Goalball ==
Summary

Team	Event	Group stage					Quarterfinal	Semifinals	Final	
Team	Event	Opposition Score	Opposition Score	Opposition Score	Opposition Score	Rank	Opposition Score	Opposition Score	Opposition Score	Rank
Canada women's	Women's tournament	RPC; L 1–5	Israel; W 6–2	Australia; L 3–4	China; L 2–4	5	did not advance			

=== Women ===
The women's goalball team qualified by being one of two teams from the 2019 IBSA Goalball Paralympic Ranking Tournament to not have qualified through other tournaments.

Roster

Canada's roster of six athletes was named on June 24, 2021. The following is the Canada roster in the women's goalball tournament of the 2020 Summer Paralympics.

No.	Player	Class	Date of birth (age)
1	Maryam Salehizadeh	B2	September 21, 1986 (aged 34)
3	Whitney Bogart	B3	April 21, 1986 (aged 35)
4	Meghan Mahon	B3	January 15, 1996 (aged 25)
5	Emma Reinke	B3	June 22, 1998 (aged 23)
6	Brieann Baldock	B3	December 14, 1995 (aged 25)
7	Amy Burk	B3	March 17, 1990 (aged 31)

Group stage

Pos	Team	Pld	W	D	L	GF	GA	GD	Pts	Qualification
1	China	4	3	0	1	17	7	+10	9	Quarterfinals
2	Israel	4	2	0	2	22	14	+8	6	Quarterfinals
3	RPC	4	2	0	2	13	16	−3	6	Quarterfinals
4	Australia	4	2	0	2	9	21	−12	6	Quarterfinals
5	Canada	4	1	0	3	12	15	−3	3	

Source: TOCOG
Rules for classification: 1) points; 2) goal difference; 3) number of wins; 4) goals against; 5) head-to-head goal difference.
25 August 2021
10:30

RPC	5–1	Canada
Gerasimova 1'; Arestova 2', 9', 16'; Chudina 23'	Report	Reinke 23'

Makuhari Messe, Tokyo
Referee: Vaida Pokvytytė (Lithuania), Yoshinori Nii (Japan)

26 August 2021
20:30

Canada	6–2	Israel
Reinke 9', 13', 14', 16'; Salehizadeh 18', 22'	Report	Mizrahi 18'; Ben-David 23'

Makuhari Messe, Tokyo
Referee: Bas Spaans (Netherlands), Romualdas Vaitiekus (Lithuania)

28 August 2021
09:00

Canada	3–4	Australia
Salehizadeh 16'; Reinke 24', 24'	Report	Horsburgh 12', 18', 19', 23'

Makuhari Messe, Tokyo
Referee: Raili Sipura (Finland), Reza Dehghan (Iran)

30 August 2021
14:45

China	4–2	Canada
Chen Fengqing 2'; Zhang Xiling 3', 4', 22'	Report	Reinke 16'; Burk 18'

Makuhari Messe, Tokyo
Referee: Vaida Pokvytytė (Lithuania), Raili Sipura (Finland)

== Judo ==
Canada qualified one female judoka. Priscilla Gagné was officially named to the team on July 16, 2021.

Athlete	Event	Preliminaries	Quarterfinals	Semifinals	Repechage First round	Repechage Final	Final / BM	
Athlete	Event	Opposition Result	Opposition Result	Opposition Result	Opposition Result	Opposition Result	Opposition Result	Rank
Priscilla Gagné	Women's -52 kg	Bye	Stepaniuk (RPC); W 01–00	Brussig (GER); W 11–00	—N/a		Abdellaoui (ALG); L 00–10	2nd place, silver medalist(s)

== Paracanoeing ==
Canada qualified four boats and three athletes (one man and two women). The team was announced on August 6, 2021. All three canoeists are making their Paralympic debut.

Key

- Note–Ranks given for are within the athlete's heat only
- Qualification Legend: FA =Qualify to final (medal); FB =Qualify to final B (non-medal); SF =Qualify to semifinal

Athlete	Event	Heats		Semifinal		Final	
Athlete	Event	Time	Rank	Time	Rank	Time	Rank
Mathieu St-Pierre	Men's VL2	59.683	8 SF	56.025	5 FA	56.029	5
Brianna Hennessy	Women's KL1	59.656	7 SF	1:01.464	6 FA	58.233	8
Brianna Hennessy	Women's VL2	1:05.608	6 SF	1:06.316	5 FA	1:03.254	5
Andrea Nelson	Women's KL2	58.999	7 SF	55.571	5 FA	56.637	8

== Paratriathlon ==
Canada qualified four triathletes (one man and three women). The team was officially named on July 12, 2021.

Athlete	Event	Swim	Trans 1	Bike	Trans 2	Run	Total time	Rank
Stefan Daniel	Men's PTS5	10:31	0:59	30:13	0:49	16:50	59:22	3rd place, bronze medalist(s)
Kamylle Frenette	Women's PTS5	11:54	1:05	34:58	0:46	21:26	1:10:09	4
Jessica Tuomela (Guide - Marianne Hogan)	Women's PTVI	12:35	1:19	32:18	1:10	25:31	1:12:53	5

== Rowing ==
Canada qualified two boats in mixed events for the games. The mixed coxed four crews qualified by winning the gold medal at the 2021 Final Qualification Regatta in Varese, Italy. While the mixed Double sculls received a bipartite commission invitation allocation. The team of seven rowers was announced on August 4, 2021.

Athlete	Event	Heats		Repechage		Final	
Athlete	Event	Time	Rank	Time	Rank	Time	Rank
Jessye Brockway; Jeremy Hall	Mixed double sculls	9:43.91	5 R	9:11.14	5 FB	9:53.64	12
Kyle Fredrickson; Bayleigh Hooper; Victoria Nolan; Andrew Todd; Laura Court c	Mixed coxed four	7:43.84	4 R	7:15.81	4 FB	7:43.03	8

Qualification Legend: FA=Final A (medal); FB=Final B (non-medal); R=Repechage

== Shooting ==
Canada qualified two shooters (one per gender) through bipartie slot allocations. The team was named on August 6, 2021.

Athlete	Event	Qualification		Final	
Athlete	Event	Score	Rank	Score	Rank
Doug Blessin	R4 – Mixed 10m air rifle standing SH2	615.4	28	did not advance	
Lyne Tremblay	R4 – Mixed 10m air rifle standing SH2	620.0	27	did not advance	
Doug Blessin	R5 – Mixed 10m air rifle prone SH2	627.5	33	did not advance	
Lyne Tremblay	R5 – Mixed 10m air rifle prone SH2	609.0	36	did not advance	
Doug Blessin	R9 – Mixed 50 metre rifle prone SH2	610.3	28	did not advance	
Lyne Tremblay	R9 – Mixed 50 metre rifle prone SH2	586.8	29	did not advance	

== Sitting volleyball ==
Summary

Team	Event	Group stage				Semifinal	Final / BM / Cl.	
Team	Event	Opposition Score	Opposition Score	Opposition Score	Rank	Opposition Score	Opposition Score	Rank
Canada women's	Women's tournament	Brazil; L 2–3	Italy; W 3–1	Japan; W 3–0	2 Q	China; L 0-3	Brazil; L 1-3	4

=== Women's tournament ===
Canada women's national sitting volleyball team qualified for the 2020 Summer Paralympics after winning the 2020 World ParaVolley Final Paralympic Qualification Event held in Halifax, Nova Scotia, Canada.

Roster

Canada's 11 member squad was named on July 22, 2021.

- Angelena Dolezar
- Danielle Ellis
- Anne Fergusson
- Julie Kozun
- Jennifer Oakes
- Heidi Peters
- Amber Skyrpan
- Payden Vair
- Felicia Voss-Shafiq
- Jolan Wong
- Katelyn Wright

Group play

Pos	Team	Pld	W	L	Pts	SW	SL	SR	SPW	SPL	SPR	Qualification
1	Brazil	3	3	0	3	9	3	3.000	289	237	1.219	Semifinals
2	Canada	3	2	1	2	8	4	2.000	278	243	1.144	Semifinals
3	Italy	3	1	2	1	5	6	0.833	227	232	0.978	Fifth place match
4	Japan (H)	3	0	3	0	0	9	0.000	143	225	0.636	Seventh place match

Source: TOCOG
(H) Host

27 August 2021; 18:30 v	Brazil	3–2	Canada	Makuhari Messe, Tokyo; Referees: Krisztina Árpás (HUN), Kim Jong-heun (KOR)
27 August 2021; 18:30 v	(21–25, 26–24, 25–20, 27–29, 17–15); Results Statistics			Makuhari Messe, Tokyo; Referees: Krisztina Árpás (HUN), Kim Jong-heun (KOR)

29 August 2021; 14:00 v	Italy	1–3	Canada	Makuhari Messe, Tokyo; Referees: Ute Fischer (GER), Andre Calado (BRA)
29 August 2021; 14:00 v	(16–25, 14–25, 25–15, 18–25); Results Statistics			Makuhari Messe, Tokyo; Referees: Ute Fischer (GER), Andre Calado (BRA)

1 September 2021; 20:30 v	Canada	3–0	Japan	Makuhari Messe, Tokyo; Referees: Huang Xiao (CHN), Sari Mannersuo (FIN)
1 September 2021; 20:30 v	(25–19, 25–15, 25–20); Results Statistics			Makuhari Messe, Tokyo; Referees: Huang Xiao (CHN), Sari Mannersuo (FIN)

Semifinal

3 September 2021; 20:30 v	China	3–0	Canada	Makuhari Messe, Tokyo; Referees: Vanessa Redes (BRA), Ritsuto Yamamichi (JPN)
3 September 2021; 20:30 v	(25–18, 25–20, 25–15); Results Statistics			Makuhari Messe, Tokyo; Referees: Vanessa Redes (BRA), Ritsuto Yamamichi (JPN)

Bronze medal game

4 September 2021; 16:30 v	(bronze) Brazil	3–1	Canada	Makuhari Messe, Tokyo; Referees: Khalid Shanishah (LBA), Ute Fischer (GER)
4 September 2021; 16:30 v	(25–15, 24–26, 26–24, 25–14); Results Statistics			Makuhari Messe, Tokyo; Referees: Khalid Shanishah (LBA), Ute Fischer (GER)

== Swimming ==
Canada qualified nineteen swimmers: six male swimmers including Nicolas-Guy Turbide who won a bronze medal at the 2016 Summer Paralympics and thirteen female swimmers including Aurelie Rivard and Katarina Roxon who both won medals at the last Paralympic Games. Tess Routliffe was scheduled to compete but withdrew from the swimming team following an injury that occurred at the World Para Swimming World Series finale in Berlin, Routliffe's teammate Danielle Kisser replaced her.

Men

Athlete	Event	Heats		Final	
Athlete	Event	Result	Rank	Result	Rank
Nicholas Bennett	200m freestyle S14	1:58.49	8 Q	1:56.52	6
Nicholas Bennett	100m breaststroke S14	1:06.73	4 Q	1:06.94	5
Nicholas Bennett	100m butterfly S14	58.38	9	did not advance	
Nicholas Bennett	200m individual medley SM14	2:13.94	4 Q	2:13.21	7
Matthew Cabraja	50m freestyle S11	28.13	9	did not advance	
Matthew Cabraja	400m freestyle S11	4:56.42	6 Q	4:57.63	7
Matthew Cabraja	100m backstroke S11	1:13.98	9	did not advance	
Matthew Cabraja	100m butterfly S11	1:06.60	3 Q	1:05.97	5
Alec Elliot	50m freestyle S10	25.22	9	did not advance	
Alec Elliot	400m freestyle S10	4:14.65	2 Q	4:10.29	5
Alec Elliot	100m butterfly S10	58.59	5 Q	58.44	5
Alec Elliot	200m individual medley SM10	2:18.01	3 Q	2:15.26	5
James Leroux	100m breaststroke SB9	—N/a		1:11.49	6
Nicolas-Guy Turbide	50m freestyle S13	24.54	8 Q	24.59	8
Nicolas-Guy Turbide	100m backstroke S13	1:01.08	3 Q	59.70	2nd place, silver medalist(s)
Zach Zona	400m freestyle S8	4:49.09	9	did not advance	

Women

Athlete	Event	Heats		Final	
Athlete	Event	Result	Rank	Result	Rank
Camille Bérubé	100m freestyle S7	1:19.64	12	did not advance	
Camille Bérubé	100m backstroke S7	—N/a		1:25.04	5
Camille Bérubé	100m breaststroke SB6	1:42.80	8 Q	1:44.07	8
Camille Bérubé	50m butterfly S7	0:42.35	6	did not advance	
Camille Bérubé	200m individual medley SM7	3:06.64	3 Q	3:03.91	5
Morgan Bird	50m freestyle S8	33.20	8 Q	32.16	6
Morgan Bird	100m butterfly S8	—N/a		1:28.05	7
Tammy Cunnington	50m backstroke S4	1:09.89	7	did not advance	
Tammy Cunnington	50m breaststroke SB3	1:17.94	13	did not advance	
Tammy Cunnington	150m individual medley SM4	3:41.06	13	did not advance	
Danielle Dorris	100m backstroke S7	—N/a		1:21.91	2nd place, silver medalist(s)
Danielle Dorris	50m butterfly S7	0:33.51	1 Q	0:32.99	1st place, gold medalist(s)
Danielle Dorris	200m individual medley SM7	3:07.53	4 Q	3:03.16	4
Sabrina Duchesne	100m freestyle S7	1:14.95	8 Q	1:14.55	6
Sabrina Duchesne	400m freestyle S7	—N/a		5:20.59	5
Nikita Ens	100m freestyle S3	2:32.26	9	did not advance	
Nikita Ens	50m backstroke S3	1:10.82	9	did not advance	
Nikita Ens	150m individual medley SM4	4:34.01	17	did not advance	
Danielle Kisser	100m breaststroke SB6	1:49.04	10	did not advance	
Angela Marina	200m freestyle S14	2:16.19	6 Q	2:15.43	6
Angela Marina	100m backstroke S14	1:14.82	5	did not advance	
Angela Marina	100m breaststroke SB14	1:27.61	13	did not advance	
Angela Marina	100m butterfly S14	1:12.00	11	did not advance	
Angela Marina	200m individual medley SM14	2:38.97	12	did not advance	
Shelby Newkirk	50m freestyle S6	35.50	9	did not advance	
Shelby Newkirk	100m freestyle S7	1:19.06	11	did not advance	
Shelby Newkirk	100m backstroke S6	1:22.83	1 Q	1:21.79	4
Aurélie Rivard	50m freestyle S10	27.74	2 Q	28.11	3rd place, bronze medalist(s)
Aurélie Rivard	100m freestyle S10	58.60	1 Q	58.14 WR	1st place, gold medalist(s)
Aurélie Rivard	400m freestyle S10	—N/a		4:24.08 WR	1st place, gold medalist(s)
Aurélie Rivard	100m backstroke S10	1:11.11	3 Q	1:08.94	2nd place, silver medalist(s)
Aurélie Rivard	200m individual medley SM10	2:34.52	3 Q	2:28.73	4
Katarina Roxon	100m freestyle S9	1:08.24	17	did not advance	
Katarina Roxon	100m breaststroke SB8	1:26.62	5 Q	1:25.73	4
Katarina Roxon	200m individual medley SM9	2:47.09	10	did not advance	
Abi Tripp	100m breaststroke SB7	DSQ		did not advance	
Aly Van Wyck-Smart	100m freestyle S3	2:49.59	14	did not advance	
Aly Van Wyck-Smart	50m backstroke S3	1:23.30	12	did not advance	
Morgan Bird; Katarina Roxon; Sabrina Duchesne; Aurélie Rivard	34pts 4x100m relay	—N/a		4:30.40	3rd place, bronze medalist(s)

== Wheelchair basketball ==
Summary

Team	Event	Group stage						Quarterfinal	Semifinals	Final / BM / Cl.	
Team	Event	Opposition Score	Opposition Score	Opposition Score	Opposition Score	Opposition Score	Rank	Opposition Score	Opposition Score	Opposition Score	Rank
Canada men's	Men's tournament	Spain; L 41–48	Turkey; L 73–77	Japan; L 56–62	South Korea; W 74–64	Colombia; W 63–52	4 Q	Great Britain; L 52–66	Did not advance	Germany; L 56–68	8
Canada women's	Women's tournament	Great Britain; W 73–54	Japan; W 61–35	Germany; L 57–59	Australia; W 76–37	—N/a	2 Q	United States; L 48–63	Did not advance	Japan; W 68–49	5

=== Men's tournament ===
The men's team qualified by winning the silver medal at the 2019 Parapan American Games in Lima, Peru.

Roster

Canada's 12 team member squad was announced on July 19, 2021. The following is the Canada roster in the men's wheelchair basketball tournament of the 2020 Summer Paralympics.

Canada men's national wheelchair basketball team - 2020 Summer Paralympics roster
Players
Coaches

No.	Name	Age – Date of birth	Pts.
4	Nikola Goncin	29 – 19 December 1991	4.5
5	Deion Green	31 – 28 April 1990	3.5
6	Robert Hedges	41 – 5 January 1980	2.5
7	Vincent Dallaire	26 – 7 March 1995	1.5
8	Blaise Mutware	27 – 14 May 1994	3.5
9	Colin Higgins	30 – 23 May 1991	4.5
10	Lee Melymick	26 – 9 January 1995	1.0
11	Chad Jassman	37 – 16 September 1983	1.5
12	Patrick Anderson	42 – 22 August 1979	4.5
13	Jonathan Vermette	30 – 4 March 1991	1.0
14	Tyler Miller	37 – 24 June 1984	1.5
15	Garrett Ostepchuk	21 – 12 March 2000	2.0

Head coach

Matteo Feriani

Assistant coach(es)

Joey Johnson, Nicolas Palmer

Legend

- Age - describes age on 24 August 2021

=== Women's tournament ===
The women's team qualified by winning the gold medal at the 2019 Parapan American Games in Lima, Peru.

Roster

Canada's 11 team member squad was announced on July 19, 2021. The following is the Canada roster in the women's wheelchair basketball tournament of the 2020 Summer Paralympics.

Canada women's national wheelchair basketball team - 2020 Summer Paralympics roster
Players
Coaches

No.	Name	Age – Date of birth	Pts.
4	Rosalie Lalonde	24 – 27 March 1997	3.0
5	Elodie Tessier	25 – 14 March 1996	2.5
6	Arinn Young	25 – 10 July 1996	4.5
7	Cindy Ouellet	32 – 8 December 1988	3.5
8	Tamara Steeves	31 – 23 September 1989	1.5
9	Danielle Duplessis	24 – 17 July 1997	4.5
10	Puisand Lai	21 – 29 July 2000	1.0
11	Tara Llanes	44 – 28 November 1976	1.5
12	Sandrine Berube	22 – 5 February 1999	4.5
13	Kady Dandeneau	31 – 25 January 1990	4.5
15	Melanie Hawtin	33 – 20 July 1988	1.0

Head coach

Marc Ducharme

Assistant coach(es)

Simon Cass, Darrell Nordell

Legend

- Age - describes age on 24 August 2021

== Wheelchair fencing ==
Canada qualified four athletes (three men and one woman). The team was officially named on July 9, 2021.

Athlete	Event	Qualification			Round of 16	Quarterfinal	Semifinal	Final / BM	
Athlete	Event	Opposition	Score	Rank	Opposition Score	Opposition Score	Opposition Score	Opposition Score	Rank
Matthieu Hebert	Men's individual foil A	Kano (JPN)	L 3-5	15	did not advance				
Matthieu Hebert	Men's individual foil A	Nalewajek (POL)	L 0-5	15	did not advance				
Matthieu Hebert	Men's individual foil A	Demchuk (UKR)	L 1-5	15	did not advance				
Matthieu Hebert	Men's individual foil A	Sun (CHN)	L 0-5	15	did not advance				
Matthieu Hebert	Men's individual sabre A	Kano (JPN)	L 1-5	15	did not advance				
Matthieu Hebert	Men's individual sabre A	Osváth (HUN)	L 0-5	15	did not advance				
Matthieu Hebert	Men's individual sabre A	Ntounis (GRE)	L 0-5	15	did not advance				
Matthieu Hebert	Men's individual sabre A	Shaburov (RPC)	L 1-5	15	did not advance				
Pierre Mainville	Men's individual épée B	Peter (FRA)	W 5-4	13	did not advance				
Pierre Mainville	Men's individual épée B	Ali (IRQ)	L 2-5	13	did not advance				
Pierre Mainville	Men's individual épée B	Kuzyukov (RPC)	L 1-5	13	did not advance				
Pierre Mainville	Men's individual épée B	Fujita (JPN)	L 2-5	13	did not advance				
Pierre Mainville	Men's individual épée B	Datsko (UKR)	L 1-5	13	did not advance				
Pierre Mainville	Men's individual épée B	Coutya (GBR)	L 1-5	13	did not advance				
Pierre Mainville	Men's individual sabre B	Valet (FRA)	L 2-5	9 Q	Valet (FRA); L 9–15	did not advance			
Pierre Mainville	Men's individual sabre B	Pluta (POL)	L 0-5	9 Q	Valet (FRA); L 9–15	did not advance			
Pierre Mainville	Men's individual sabre B	Chaves (BRA)	W 5-0	9 Q	Valet (FRA); L 9–15	did not advance			
Pierre Mainville	Men's individual sabre B	Tarjányi (HUN)	L 4-5	9 Q	Valet (FRA); L 9–15	did not advance			
Pierre Mainville	Men's individual sabre B	Kurzin (RPC)	L 2-5	9 Q	Valet (FRA); L 9–15	did not advance			
Ryan Rousell	Men's individual épée A	Lambertini (ITA)	L 1-5	14	did not advance				
Ryan Rousell	Men's individual épée A	Schmidt (GER)	L 2-5	14	did not advance				
Ryan Rousell	Men's individual épée A	Shaburov (RPC)	L 4-5	14	did not advance				
Ryan Rousell	Men's individual épée A	Akkaya (TUR)	L 0-5	14	did not advance				
Ryan Rousell	Men's individual épée A	Al-Madhkhoori (IRQ)	L 0-5	14	did not advance				
Ryan Rousell	Men's individual sabre A	Demchuk (UKR)	L 4-5	13	did not advance				
Ryan Rousell	Men's individual sabre A	Giordan (ITA)	L 0-5	13	did not advance				
Ryan Rousell	Men's individual sabre A	Li (CHN)	L 3-5	13	did not advance				
Ryan Rousell	Men's individual sabre A	Schmidt (GER)	L 3-5	13	did not advance				
Sylvie Morel	Women's individual foil A	Oliveira (BRA)	W 5-3	15	did not advance				
Sylvie Morel	Women's individual foil A	Morkvych (UKR)	L 1-5	15	did not advance				
Sylvie Morel	Women's individual foil A	Trigilia (ITA)	L 2-5	15	did not advance				
Sylvie Morel	Women's individual foil A	Rong (CHN)	L 1-5	15	did not advance				
Sylvie Morel	Women's individual foil A	Sycheva (RPC)	L 2-5	15	did not advance				
Sylvie Morel	Women's individual sabre A	Tibilashvili (GEO)	L 2-5	14	did not advance				
Sylvie Morel	Women's individual sabre A	Dróżdż (POL)	L 0-5	14	did not advance				
Sylvie Morel	Women's individual sabre A	Gu (CHN)	L 1-5	14	did not advance				
Sylvie Morel	Women's individual sabre A	Sycheva (RPC)	L 3-5	14	did not advance				

== Wheelchair rugby ==
The Canadian team qualified for the games by winning the Final Qualification Tournament held in Richmond, British Columbia in March 2020.

Summary

Squad	Group stage				Semifinal	5th vs 6th	Rank
Squad	Opposition Result	Opposition Result	Opposition Result	Rank	Opposition Result	Opposition Result	Rank
Canada national team	Great Britain; L 47–50	United States; L 54–58	New Zealand; W 51–36	3	Did not advance	France; W 57–49	5

Team roster

Canada's 12 team roster was announced on July 28, 2021.

- Cody Caldwell
- Patrice Dagenais
- Eric Furtado-Rodrigues
- Byron Green
- Trevor Hirschfield
- Fabien Lavoie
- Anthony Létourneau
- Zak Madell
- Travis Murao
- Patrice Simard
- Shayne Smith
- Mike Whitehead

Group stage

Pos	Team	Pld	W	D	L	GF	GA	GD	Pts	Qualification
1	United States	3	3	0	0	171	137	+34	6	Semi-finals
2	Great Britain	3	2	0	1	158	134	+24	4	Semi-finals
3	Canada	3	1	0	2	152	144	+8	2	Fifth place Match
4	New Zealand	3	0	0	3	108	174	−66	0	Seventh place Match

Source: Tokyo2020
25 August 2021
12:45

Canada	47–50	Great Britain

Yoyogi National Stadium, Tokyo

26 August 2021
12:45

United States	58–54	Canada

Yoyogi National Stadium, Tokyo

27 August 2021
12:45

New Zealand	36–51	Canada

Yoyogi National Stadium, Tokyo

Classification 5th/6th

28 August 2021
20:00

France	49–57	Canada

Yoyogi National Stadium, Tokyo

== Wheelchair tennis ==
Canada qualified one wheelchair tennis athlete. Robert Shaw qualified by being ranked 9th in the world.

Athlete	Event	Round of 16	Quarterfinals	Semifinals	Final / BM	
Athlete	Event	Opposition Result	Opposition Result	Opposition Result	Opposition Result	Rank
Robert Shaw	Quad singles	Lapthorne (GBR); L 3–6, 3-6	did not advance			

== See also ==
- Canada at the 2018 Commonwealth Games
- Canada at the 2019 Parapan American Games
- Canada at the 2020 Summer Olympics
