= 2017 World Para Athletics Championships – Men's 5000 metres =

The men's 5000 metres at the 2017 World Para Athletics Championships was held at the Olympic Stadium in London from 14 to 23 July.

== Medalists ==
Event	Gold		Silver		Bronze	
T11	Samwel Mushai Kimani; Guide: James Boit; Kenya	15:41.54	Cristian Valenzuela; Guides: Francisco Munoz / Raul Moya; Chile	15:49.63	Shinya Wada; Guide: Kotaro Minowa; Japan	15:54.29 PB
T13	Youssef Benibrahim; Morocco	14:20.69 WR	Bilel Aloui; Tunisia	14:21.69 PB	Guillaume Ouellet; Canada	14:23.24 AR
T20	Cristiano Pereira; Portugal	14:29.80 CR	Michael Brannigan; United States	14:39.87	Pavlo Voluikevych; Ukraine	15:01.59
T54	Marcel Hug; Switzerland	11:10.72	Rawat Tana; Thailand	11:11.12	Alhassane Baldé; Germany	11:11.92
WR world record | AR area record | CR championship record | GR games record | NR national record | OR Olympic record | PB personal best | SB season best | WL world leading (in a given season)

Events listed in pink were contested but no medals were awarded.

== See also ==
- List of IPC world records in athletics
