= Bilel Aloui =

Tunisian Paralympic athlete

Personal information
- Born: 29 August 1990 (age 36)

Sport
- Country: Tunisia
- Sport: Para-athletics
- Disability: Vision impairment
- Event: 5000 metres
Medal record
Paralympic Games
Bronze medal – third place	2016 Rio de Janeiro	5000 m T13
World Championships
Silver medal – second place	2017 London	5000 m T13

Bilel Aloui (born 29 August 1990) is a visually impaired Tunisian Paralympic athlete. He represented Tunisia at the 2016 Summer Paralympics held in Rio de Janeiro, Brazil and he won the bronze medal in the men's 5000 metres T13 event. He also competed in the men's 1500 metres T13 event where he finished in 6th place.

At the 2017 World Para Athletics Championships held in London, United Kingdom, he won the silver medal in the men's 5000 metres T13 event.
