= Athletics at the 2020 Summer Paralympics – Men's marathon =

The Men's marathon athletics events for the 2020 Summer Paralympics took place in Tokyo on September 5, 2021. A total of 3 events were contested over this distance.

== Medal summary ==
The following is a summary of the medals awarded across all marathon events.

| Classification | Gold | | Silver | | Bronze | |
|---|---|---|---|---|---|---|
| T12 | El Amin Chentouf; Morocco | 2:21:43 GR | Jaryd Clifford; Australia | 2:26:09 | Tadashi Horikoshi; Japan | 2:28:01 |
| T46 | Li Chaoyan; China | 2:25:50 GR | Alex Pires; Brazil | 2:27:00 AR | Tsutomu Nagata; Japan | 2:29:33 |
| T54 | Marcel Hug; Switzerland | 1:24:02 | Zhang Yong; China | 1:24:22 | Daniel Romanchuk; United States | 1:29:05 |
