= Athletics at the 2020 Summer Paralympics – Men's 400 metres T38 =

Men's 400 metres T38 at the XVI Paralympic Games
- Venue: Tokyo National Stadium
- Dates: 30 August 2021 (heats); 31 August 2021 (final)
- Competitors: 11 from 11 nations
- Winning time: 49.99

Medalists
| 1st place, gold medalist(s) | | Jose Rodolfo Chessani | Mexico |
| 2nd place, silver medalist(s) | | Mohamed Farhat Chida | Tunisia |
| 3rd place, bronze medalist(s) | | Zachary Gingras | Canada |

The men's 400 metres T38 event at the 2020 Summer Paralympics in Tokyo, took place between 30 and 31 August 2021.

The T38 category is for ambulant athletes with cerebral palsy. T38 athletes have the mildest form of impairment caused by cerebral palsy, often in only one limb, and not affecting the ability to run, walk or jump freely, although impairing performance. T38 athletes may suffer minor co-ordination difficulties.

== Records ==
Prior to the competition, the existing records were as follows:

| World record | Mohamed Farhat Chida (TUN) | 49.33 | Christchurch, New Zealand | 29 January 2011 |
| Paralympic record | Dyan Buis (RSA) | 49.46 | Rio de Janeiro, Brazil | 17 September 2016 |

| Area | Time | Athlete | Nation |
|---|---|---|---|
| Africa | 49.33 WR | Mohamed Farhat Chida | Tunisia |
| America | 51.10 | Dixon Hooker | Colombia |
| Asia | 50.27 | Hu Jianwen | China |
| Europe | 51.37 | Stephen Payton | Great Britain |
| Oceania | 49.72 | Evan O'Hanlon | Australia |

== Results ==
=== Heats ===
Heat 1 took place on 30 August 2021, at 12:11:

| Rank | Lane | Name | Nationality | Time | Notes |
|---|---|---|---|---|---|
| 1 | 3 | Dyan Buis | South Africa | 51.29 | Q, SB |
| 2 | 4 | Shaun Burrows | Great Britain | 53.72 | Q |
| 3 | 5 | Mohamed Farhat Chida | Tunisia | 54.67 | Q |
| 4 | 6 | Dixon Hooker | Colombia | 55.59 | q, SB |
| | 7 | Edson Pinheiro | Brazil | DNS | |

Heat 2 took place on 30 August 2021, at 12:19:

| Rank | Lane | Name | Nationality | Time | Notes |
|---|---|---|---|---|---|
| 1 | 8 | Jose Rodolfo Chessani | Mexico | 50.84 | Q, AR |
| 2 | 3 | Zachary Gingras | Canada | 51.81 | Q, PB |
| 3 | 6 | Ali Al-Rikabi | Iraq | 53.27 | Q |
| 4 | 7 | Anton Feoktistov | RPC | 53.57 | q |
| 5 | 4 | Carlos Alberto Castillo | Nicaragua | 59.35 | SB |
| 6 | 5 | Carlos Velasquez | Honduras | 1:03.06 | SB |

=== Final ===
The final took place on 31 August 2021, at 19:31:

| Rank | Lane | Name | Nationality | Time | Notes |
|---|---|---|---|---|---|
| 1st place, gold medalist(s) | 7 | Jose Rodolfo Chessani | Mexico | 49.99 | AR |
| 2nd place, silver medalist(s) | 9 | Mohamed Farhat Chida | Tunisia | 50.33 | SB |
| 3rd place, bronze medalist(s) | 5 | Zachary Gingras | Canada | 50.85 | PB |
| 4 | 8 | Ali Al-Rikabi | Iraq | 50.90 | PB |
| 5 | 6 | Dyan Buis | South Africa | 51.39 | |
| 6 | 2 | Anton Feoktistov | RPC | 52.27 | |
| 7 | 4 | Shaun Burrows | Great Britain | 53.25 | |
| 8 | 3 | Dixon Hooker | Colombia | 54.04 | SB |
