= Rodgers Kiprop =

Kenyan Paralympic athlete

Personal information
- Nationality: Kenyan
- Born: 17 October 1992 (age 33)

Sport
- Sport: Paralympic athletics
- Disability: Visually impaired
- Disability class: T11
- Event: Long-distance running

Rodgers Kiprop (born 17 October 1992) is a Kenyan Paralympic athlete. He made his first Paralympic appearance during the 2020 Summer Paralympics.

== Career ==
He represented Kenya at the 2020 Summer Paralympics and competed in men's 5000m T11 event.
