= Darwin Castro =

Ecuadorian Paralympic athlete

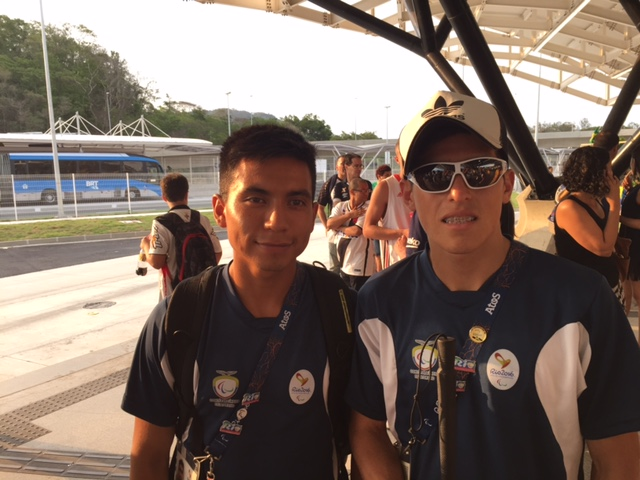
- Castro (left) at the 2016 Summer Paralympics

Personal information
- Full name: Darwin Gustavo Castro Reyes
- Nationality: Ecuador
- Born: 6 July 1993 (age 32) Cuenca, Ecuador
Medal record
Athletics
World Championships
Bronze medal – third place	2025 New Delhi	5000 m T13
Parapan American Games
Bronze medal – third place	2015 Toronto	5000 m T11

Darwin Gustavo Castro Reyes (born 6 July 1993) is an Ecuadorian Paralympian athlete competing mainly in the middle and long-distance events.

== Early life ==
Darwin Gustavo Castro Reyes was born on 6 July 1993 in Cuenca, Ecuador. In 2012, Castro had lost his vision as a result of being diagnosed with keratoconus. Unable to restore his vision, he turned to para-athletics, in which he credits for feeling alive again.

== Career ==
Castro competed at the 2015 Parapan American Games, where he won the bronze medal in the 5000 m T11. At the 2016 Summer Paralympics, he made his Paralympic debut and competed in the 1500 and 5000 metres, finishing in seventh place in the latter. At the 2020 Summer Paralympics, Castro competed in the 1500 and 5000 metres, finishing in fifth and sixth place in these respective events. At the 2024 Summer Paralympics, he competed in the 1500 and 5000 metres, finishing in seventh place in the latter. At the 2025 World Para Athletics Championships, Castro won the bronze medal in the 5000 m T13 event.
