= Fedor Rudakov =

Russian Paralympic athlete (born 1994)

Personal information
- Nationality: Russian
- Born: 28 April 1994 (age 32)

Sport
- Sport: Para athletics
- Disability: Visual impairment
- Disability class: T11
- Event: Middle-distance running
- Coached by: Elena Popova; Alexander Popov
Medal record
Men's para-athletics
Representing RPC
Paralympic Games
Bronze medal – third place	2020 Tokyo	1500 m T11
Representing Neutral Paralympic Athletes (NPA)
World Championships
Bronze medal – third place	2024 Kobe	1500 m T11
Bronze medal – third place	2025 New Delhi	1500 m T11
Representing Russia
World Championships
Silver medal – second place	2019 Dubai	1500 m T11
European Championships
Gold medal – first place	2021 Bydgoszcz	1500 m T11

Fedor Rudakov (born 28 April 1994) is a visually impaired Russian Paralympic athlete who specializes in middle-distance running. He represented Russian Paralympic Committee athletes at the 2020 Summer Paralympics.

== Career ==
Rudakov represented Russian Paralympic Committee athletes at the 2020 Summer Paralympics in the men's 1500 m T11 event and won a bronze medal.
