= Rouay Jebabli =

Tunisian Paralympic athlete

Personal information
- Nationality: Tunisian
- Born: 17 November 1997 (age 28) Tajerouine, Tunisia

Sport
- Sport: Paralympic athletics
- Disability class: T12
- Event: Middle-distance running
Medal record
Men's para-athletics
Representing Tunisia
Paralympic Games
| Silver medal – second place | 2020 Tokyo | 1500 m T13 |
| Silver medal – second place | 2024 Paris | 1500 m T13 |
| Bronze medal – third place | 2024 Paris | 400 m T12 |
World Championships
| Gold medal – first place | 2023 Paris | 400 m T12 |
| Gold medal – first place | 2023 Paris | 1500 m T13 |
| Silver medal – second place | 2024 Kobe | 1500 m T13 |
| Bronze medal – third place | 2024 Kobe | 400 m T12 |

Rouay Jebabli (born 17 November 1997) is a Tunisian para-athlete who specializes in middle-distance running. He represented Tunisia at the 2020 Summer Paralympics.

== Career ==
Jebabli represented Tunisia in the men's 1500 metres T13 event at the 2020 Summer Paralympics and won a silver medal.
