= Kenya Karasawa =

Japanese Paralympic athlete (born 1994)

Personal information
- Nationality: Japanese
- Born: 3 July 1994 (age 32) Shibukawa, Japan

Sport
- Sport: Paralympic athletics
- Disability class: T11
- Club: Gunma Prefectural Braille Library
- Coached by: Kazuaki Hoshino
Medal record
Paralympic athletics
Representing Japan
Paralympic Games
Silver medal – second place	2020 Tokyo	5000 m T11
Silver medal – second place	2024 Paris	5000 m T11
World Championships
Gold medal – first place	2023 Paris	5000 m T11
Gold medal – first place	2025 New Delhi	5000 m T11
Silver medal – second place	2023 Paris	1500 m T11
Bronze medal – third place	2019 Dubai	5000 m T11
Bronze medal – third place	2024 Kobe	5000 m T11
Asian Para Games
Gold medal – first place	2018 Jakarta	5000m T11
Gold medal – first place	2026 Aichi–Nagoya	5000m T11
Bronze medal – third place	2018 Jakarta	1500m T11

Kenya Karasawa (唐澤 剣也, Karasawa Kenya, born 3 July 1994 in Shibukawa, Gunma Prefecture) is a visually impaired Japanese Paralympic long-distance runner. He represented Japan at the 2020 and 2024 Summer Paralympics.

== Career ==
Karasawa represented Japan in the 5000 m T11 event at the 2020 Summer Paralympics and won a silver medal.

== Personal life ==
Karasawa was born in Gunma Prefecture, Japan. Domestically, he competes for the Subaru Track and Field Team.
