= Jaryd Clifford =

Australian Paralympic athlete (born 1999)

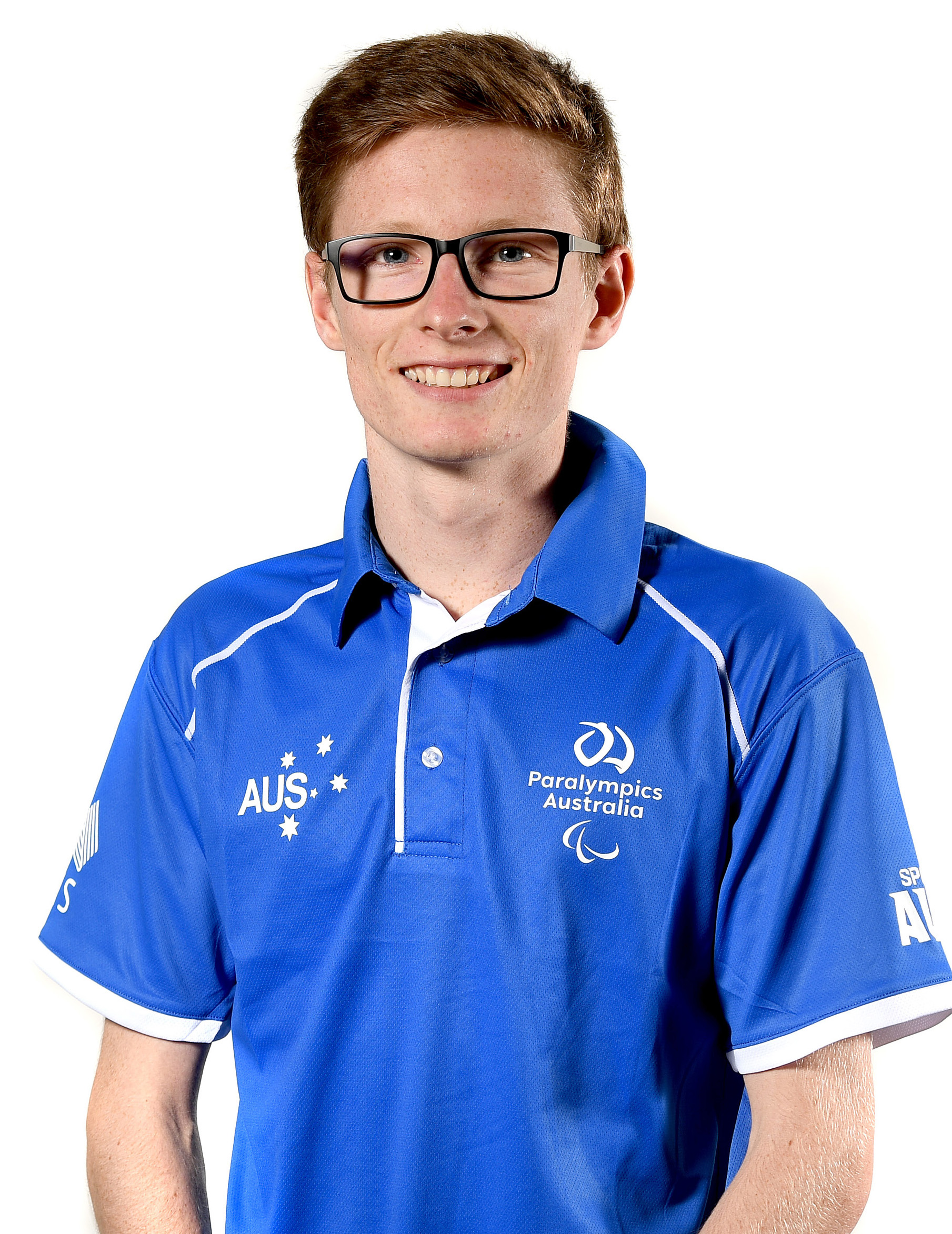
- Jaryd Clifford in 2019

Personal information
- Nationality: Australian
- Born: 5 July 1999 (age 27)

Sport
- Club: Diamond Valley Athletic Club
Medal record
Paralympic athletics
Representing Australia
Summer Paralympics
Silver medal – second place	2020 Tokyo	5000 m T13
Silver medal – second place	2020 Tokyo	Marathon T12
Bronze medal – third place	2020 Tokyo	1500 m T13
World Championships
Gold medal – first place	2019 Dubai	1500 m T13
Gold medal – first place	2019 Dubai	5000 m T13
Silver medal – second place	2023 Paris	5000 m T13
Bronze medal – third place	2017 London	1500 m T13
Bronze medal – third place	2025 New Delhi	1500 m T13

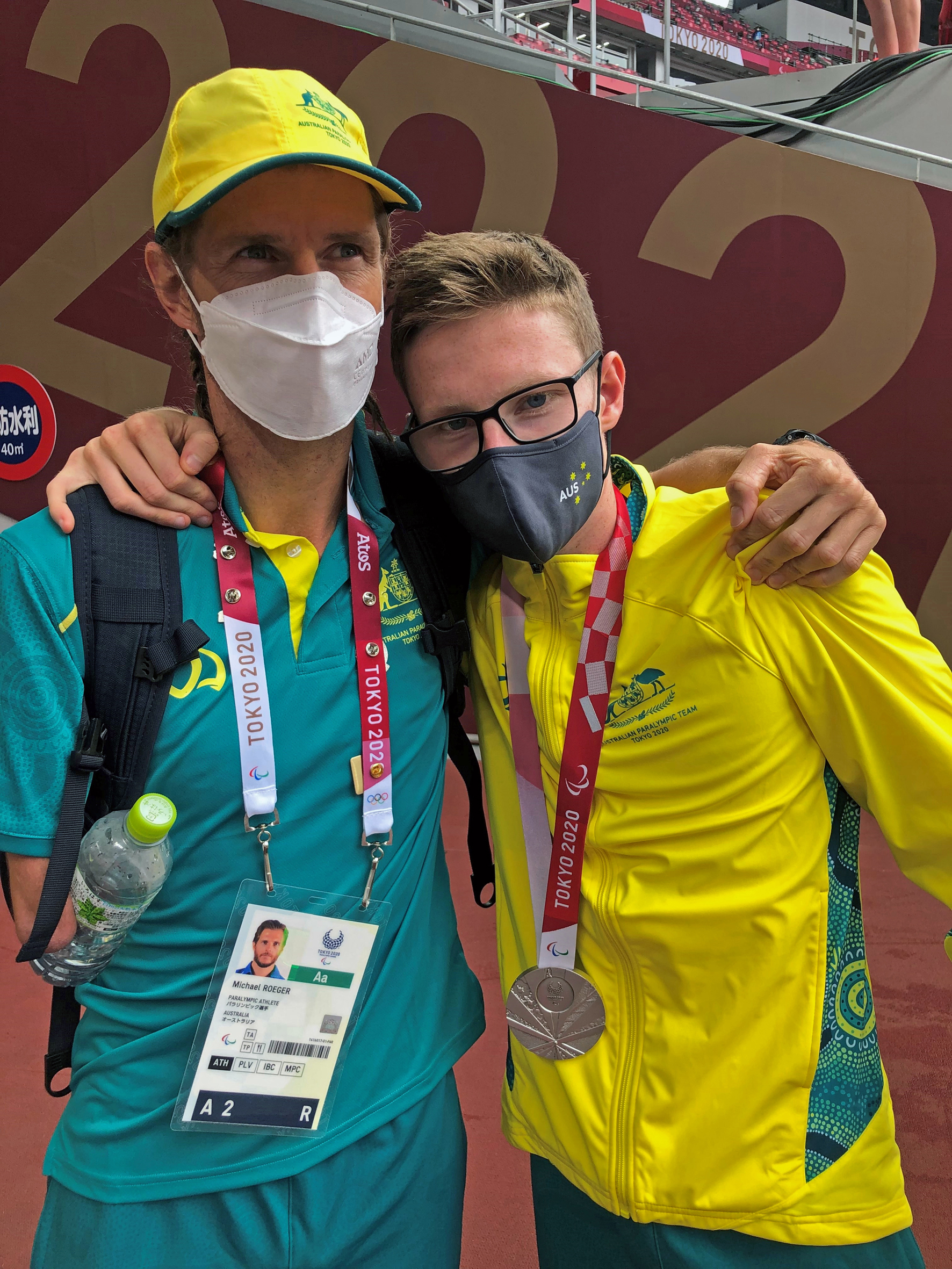
Australian athletes Michael Roeger (left) and Jaryd Clifford after the medal presentations for the marathon at the Tokyo 2020 (2021) Paralympics. Roeger finished 6th in the T46 class and Clifford finished second in the T12 class.

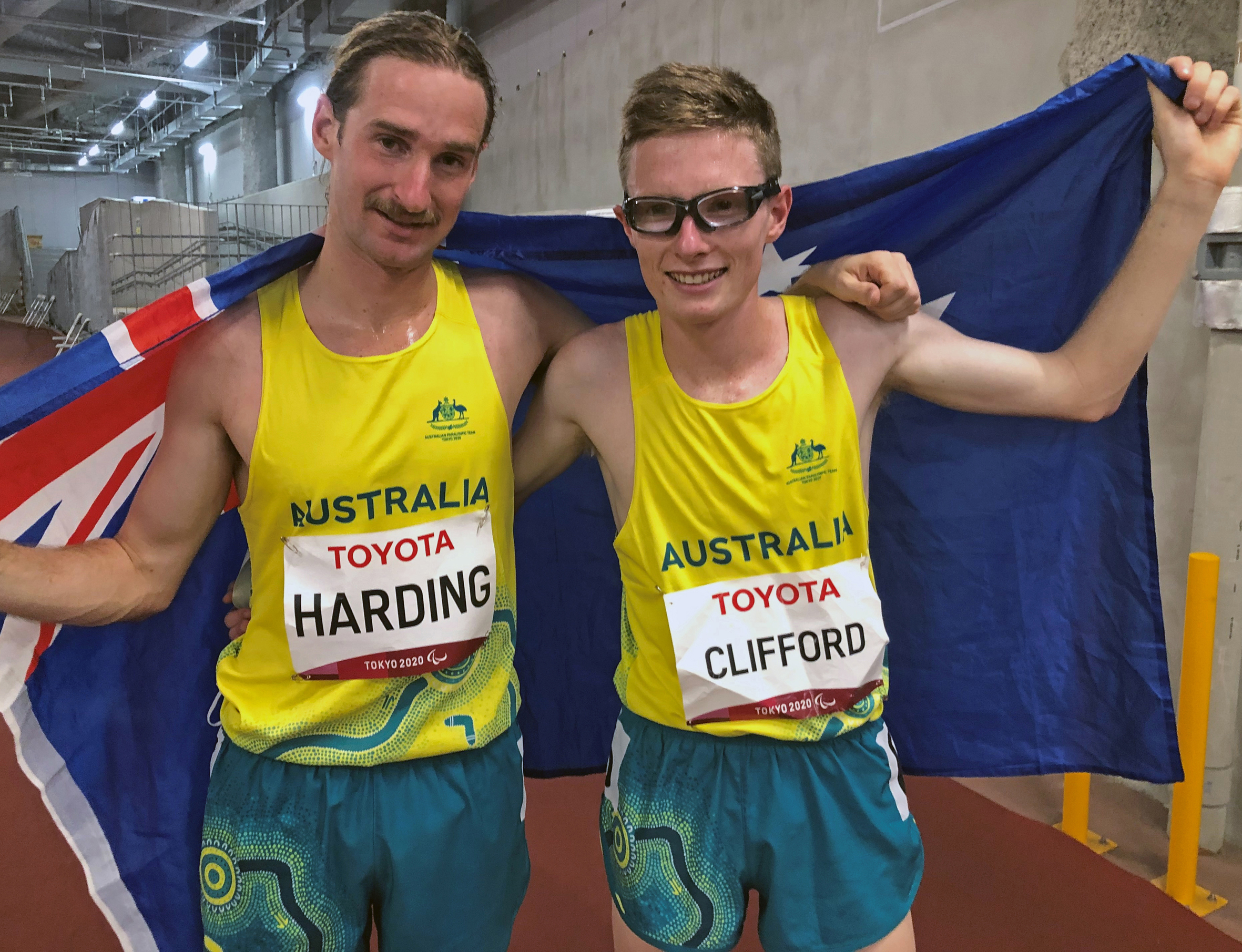
Australian vision impaired athletes Sam Harding (left) and Jaryd Clifford after their 1500m race at the Tokyo 2020 (2021) Paralympic Games

Jaryd Clifford (born 5 July 1999) is a visually impaired Australian Paralympic middle-distance and marathon runner. He represented Australia at the 2016 Rio Paralympics in athletics. He won gold medals in the Men's 1500m and 5000m T13 events at the 2019 World Para Athletics Championships. Clifford represented Australia at the 2020 Tokyo Paralympics, where he won silver medals in the Men's 5000m T13 and Men's Marathon T12, and a bronze medal in the Men's 1500 m T13. He competed at the 2024 Paris Paralympics.

== Personal ==
Clifford was born on 5 July 1999. During primary school his eyesight deteriorated due to juvenile macular degeneration.

== Athletics ==
Clifford is classified as a T12 athlete. In 2014, Clifford came 4th in the 3000m at the Australian All Schools Championships. He competed at the 2015 IPC Athletics World Championships in Doha and came 7th in the T12/13 3000m. In January 2016, his time of 3min 59.6s in the 1500m qualified him for the 2016 Rio Paralympics and he took 10 seconds off the Australian record for T12 athletes. The record had lasted for more than 30 years.

At the 2016 Rio Paralympics, he finished seventh in both the Men's 1500m T13 and Men's 5000m T13 events.

At the 2017 World Para Athletics Championships in London, England, Clifford won the bronze medal in the Men's 1500m T13 in a time of 3:53.31. Clifford credited his altitude training and European racing with assisting him in winning a medal.

At the Sydney Grand Prix on 18 March 2018, Clifford broke the Men's 1500m T12 world record with a time of 3:45.18. He lowered the previous world record of 3:48.31 set by Tunisia's Abderrahim Zhiou at the 2012 London Paralympics.

At the 2019 World Para Athletics Championships in Dubai, Clifford set a world record time of 3:47.78 in winning the gold medal in the Men's 1500m T13. Clifford with his two guides Tim Logan and Philo Saunders won the Men's 5000m T13. Clifford stated he needs guides for the 5000m due to his deteriorating eyesight making the event dangerous for him.

In 2018, Clifford is a member of the Diamond Valley Athletic Club and Victorian Institute of Sport scholarship holder. In 2020, Jaryd made a permanent move to Canberra.

In his first marathon on 25 April 2021, Clifford ran 2:19:08 to break the existing world record of 2:21:33.

At the 2020 Summer Paralympics in Tokyo, he won silver medals in the Men's 5000m T13 and Men's Marathon T12, and a bronze medal in the Men's 1500 m T13.

Despite a stress fracture in his left femur, Clifford won the silver medal in the Men's 5000m T13 at the 2023 World Para Athletics Championships in Paris. In the lead up to the 2024 Summer Paralympics, Clifford finished sixth in the Men's 1500m and Men's 5000m T13 events at the 2024 World Para Athletics Championships in Kobe.

His guides at the 2024 Paris Paralympics were Tim Logan and Matthew Clarke. He finished fourth in the Men's 1500 T13 with a season's best 3:44.95. In the Men's 5000 T13, he crossed the line in third place but was disqualified after dropping the tether to Matthew Clarke just near the finish line. At the 2025 World Para Athletics Championships in New Delhi, he won the bronze medal in Men's 1500m T13 and finished fifth in the Men's 5000M T13.

His philosophy is "Not everything that is faced can be changed, but nothing can be changed until it is faced".

=== Marathon progression ===
Distance	Time / Distance	Location	Date
Marathon	2:19:08 WR	Sydney	25 April 2021
Marathon	2:26:09	Tokyo	5 September 2021

== Recognition ==
- 2017 – Victorian Disability Sport and Recreation Awards – Marg Angel Junior Sportsperson of the Year
- 2018 – Sport Australia Hall of Fame Scholarship and mentored by Lauren Burns
- 2022 - Athletics Australia Russell Short Award for Male Para Athlete of the Year
