= Yassine Ouhdadi =

Spanish Paralympic athlete (born 1994)

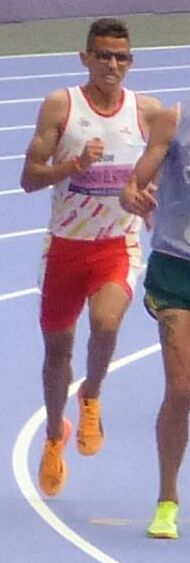

Personal information
- Full name: Yassine Ouhdadi El Ataby
- Born: 20 August 1994 (age 31) Morocco

Sport
- Country: Spain
- Sport: Paralympic athletics
- Disability: Cataracts
- Disability class: T13
- Event(s): 1500 metres 5000 metres
Medal record
Paralympic athletics
Representing Spain
Paralympic Games
Gold medal – first place	2020 Tokyo	5000m T13
Gold medal – first place	2024 Paris	5000m T13
World Championships
Gold medal – first place	2023 Paris	5000m T13
Gold medal – first place	2024 Kobe	5000m T13
Silver medal – second place	2019 Dubai	5000m T13
Silver medal – second place	2023 Paris	1500 m T13
European Championships
Silver medal – second place	2021 Bydgoszcz	5000m T13
Bronze medal – third place	2021 Bydgoszcz	1500m T13

Yassine Ouhdadi El Ataby (born 20 August 1994) is a partially sighted Paralympic athlete who competes in long distance running events at international elite competitions. Born in Morocco, he represents Spain internationally. El Ataby is the current holder of the World record in the 1500 m T13 category following the 2024 Summer Paralympics.

== Career ==
Ouhdadi qualified for the 2020 Summer Paralympics after achieving the minimal qualification mark in the 5000m T13 at a regional athletics championships in Girona.
