= Yeltsin Jacques =

Brazilian Paralympic athlete (born 1991)

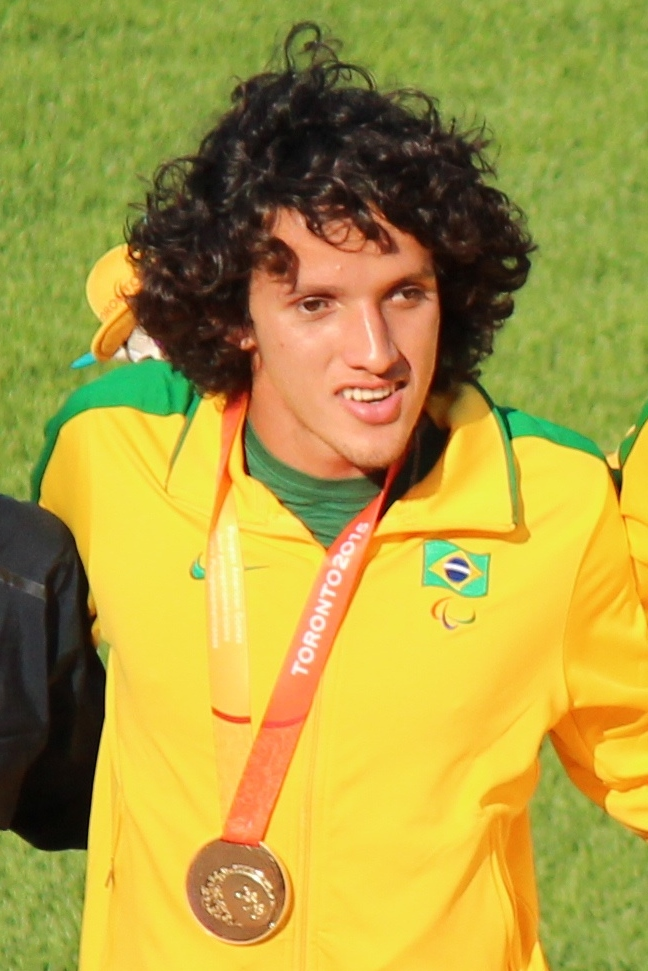
- Jacques at the 2015 Parapan American Games

Personal information
- Full name: Yeltsin Francisco Ortega Jacques
- Born: 21 September 1991 (age 34)
- Education: Anhanguera Educacional
- Height: 179 cm (5 ft 10 in)
- Weight: 68 kg (150 lb)

Sport
- Sport: Para athletics
- Disability class: T11, T12
- Event(s): 800 m, 1500 m, 5000 m
Medal record
Representing Brazil
Summer Paralympics
Gold medal – first place	2020 Tokyo	1500 m T11
Gold medal – first place	2020 Tokyo	5000 m T11
Gold medal – first place	2024 Paris	1500 m T11
Bronze medal – third place	2024 Paris	5000 m T11
World Championships
Gold medal – first place	2013 Lyon	800 m T12
Gold medal – first place	2023 Paris	1500 m T11
Gold medal – first place	2024 Kobe	5000 m T11
Gold medal – first place	2025 New Delhi	1500 m T11
Silver medal – second place	2013 Lyon	1500 m T12
Silver medal – second place	2025 New Delhi	5000 m T11
Bronze medal – third place	2023 Paris	5000 m T11
Parapan American Games
Gold medal – first place	2015 Toronto	1500 m T12
Gold medal – first place	2015 Toronto	5000 m T12
Gold medal – first place	2023 Santiago	5000 m T11

Yeltsin Francisco Ortega Jacques (Note: This name uses Portuguese naming customs: the first or maternal family name is Ortega and the second or paternal family name is Jacques.) (born 21 September 1991) is a visually impaired Brazilian Paralympic runner named after the former Russian president Boris Yeltsin.

== Career ==
He won the 1500 m and 5000 m events at the 2015 Parapan American Games, placing 5th–11th at the 2016 Summer Paralympics. He also medaled in the 800 m and 1500 m events at the 2013 World Championships.
