= Guillaume Ouellet =

Canadian Paralympic athlete

Personal information
- Born: October 3, 1986 (age 39) Sorel-Tracy, Quebec, Canada
- Home town: Victoriaville, Quebec, Canada
- Height: 174 cm (5 ft 9 in)

Sport
- Sport: Para athletics
- Disability: Visual impairment
- Disability class: T13
- Club: Club Citius
- Coached by: Dany Racine
Medal record
Men's para athletics
Representing Canada
World Championships
| Gold medal – first place | 2015 Doha | 5000m T13 |
| Bronze medal – third place | 2017 London | 5000m T13 |
| Bronze medal – third place | 2023 Paris | 5000m T13 |
Parapan American Games
| Gold medal – first place | 2015 Toronto | 1500m T13 |
| Gold medal – first place | 2019 Lima | 5000m T13 |

Guillaume Ouellet (born October 3, 1986) is a Canadian para-athlete competing in T13 middle and long-distance races.

== Career history ==
Ouellet began took up athletics in 2011 at college. In 2013 he was selected to represent Canada at the 2013 World Championships in Lyon in the 1500 metres race, finishing fourth. Two years later he was back in the Canadian team to compete at his second World Championships, this time in Doha. He competed in both the 1,500m and 5,000m, winning gold in the latter, with a time of 15:07.64.

At the 2017 World Para Athletics Championships held in London, United Kingdom he won the bronze medal in the men's 5000 metres T13 event.
