= Shinya Wada =

Japanese Paralympic athlete

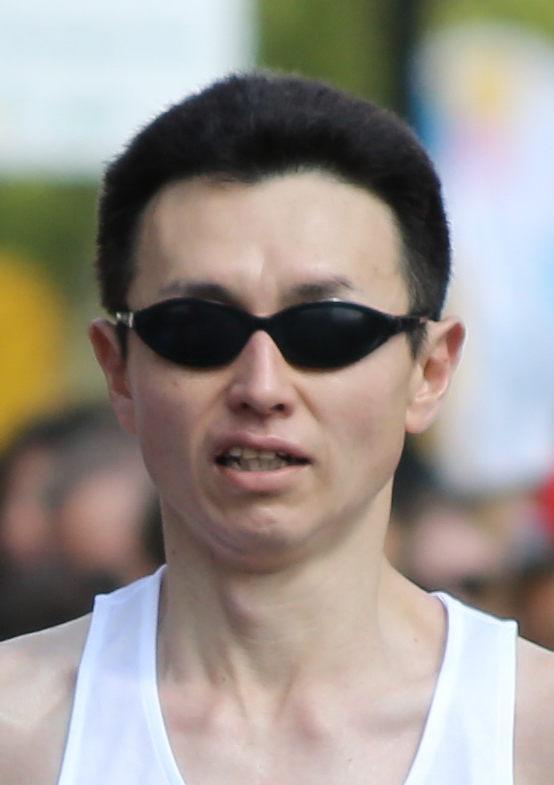

Personal information
- Native name: 和田伸也
- Nationality: Japanese
- Born: 9 July 1977 (age 49) Neyagawa, Osaka pref., Japan
- Height: 176 cm (5 ft 9 in)
- Weight: 62 kg (137 lb)

Sport
- Sport: Paralympic athletics
- Disability class: T11

Achievements and titles
- Paralympic finals: 2012 London; 2016 Rio de Janeiro
Medal record
Men's para athletics
Representing Japan
Paralympic Games
Bronze medal – third place	2012 London	5000 m T11
Bronze medal – third place	2020 Tokyo	5000 m T11
World Championships
Silver medal – second place	2013 Lyon	Marathon T11
Bronze medal – third place	2011 Christchurch	Marathon T11
Bronze medal – third place	2015 Doha	5000 m T11
Bronze medal – third place	2017 London	5000 m T11
World Para Athletics Marathon World Cup
Gold medal – first place	2017 London	Marathon T11/12
Asian Para Games
Gold medal – first place	2014 Incheon	800 m T11
Gold medal – first place	2014 Incheon	1500 m T11
Gold medal – first place	2014 Incheon	5000 m T11
Silver medal – second place	2018 Jakarta	1500 m T11
Silver medal – second place	2018 Jakarta	5000 m T11
Silver medal – second place	2026 Aichi–Nagoya	5000m T11

Shinya Wada (和田 伸也, Wada Shin'ya; born 9 July 1977 in Neyagawa, Osaka pref.) is a visually impaired Japanese long-distance runner. Competing in the T11 classification, Shinya has represented his country at the 2012 Summer Paralympics in London, where he took the bronze medal in the men's 5000m T11 race. He is also a multiple World and Asian Para Games medalist, taking six medals over four tournaments.

== Personal bests ==
Event	Record	Date	Competition	Notes
800 m T11	2:07.12	24 September 2017	2017 Japan Para Athletics Championships	Asian/National Record
1500 m T11	4:15.62	13 September 2016	Rio 2016 Paralympics	National Record
5000 m T11	15:48.97	2 December 2018	Osaka Association of All Athletics 2nd Long Distance Meeting in 2018	National Record
10,000 m T11	34:21.89	23 January 2011	2011 IPC Athletics World Championships	Asian/National Record
10 km	33:08	5 March 2017	39th Chiba Prefecture citizens' Marathon	
Half marathon	1:11:37	29 January 2017	2017 Osaka Half Marathon	
Marathon T11	2:32:11	4 December 2016	70th Fukuoka International Open Marathon Championship	National Record
As of 2 December 2018

== Gallery ==
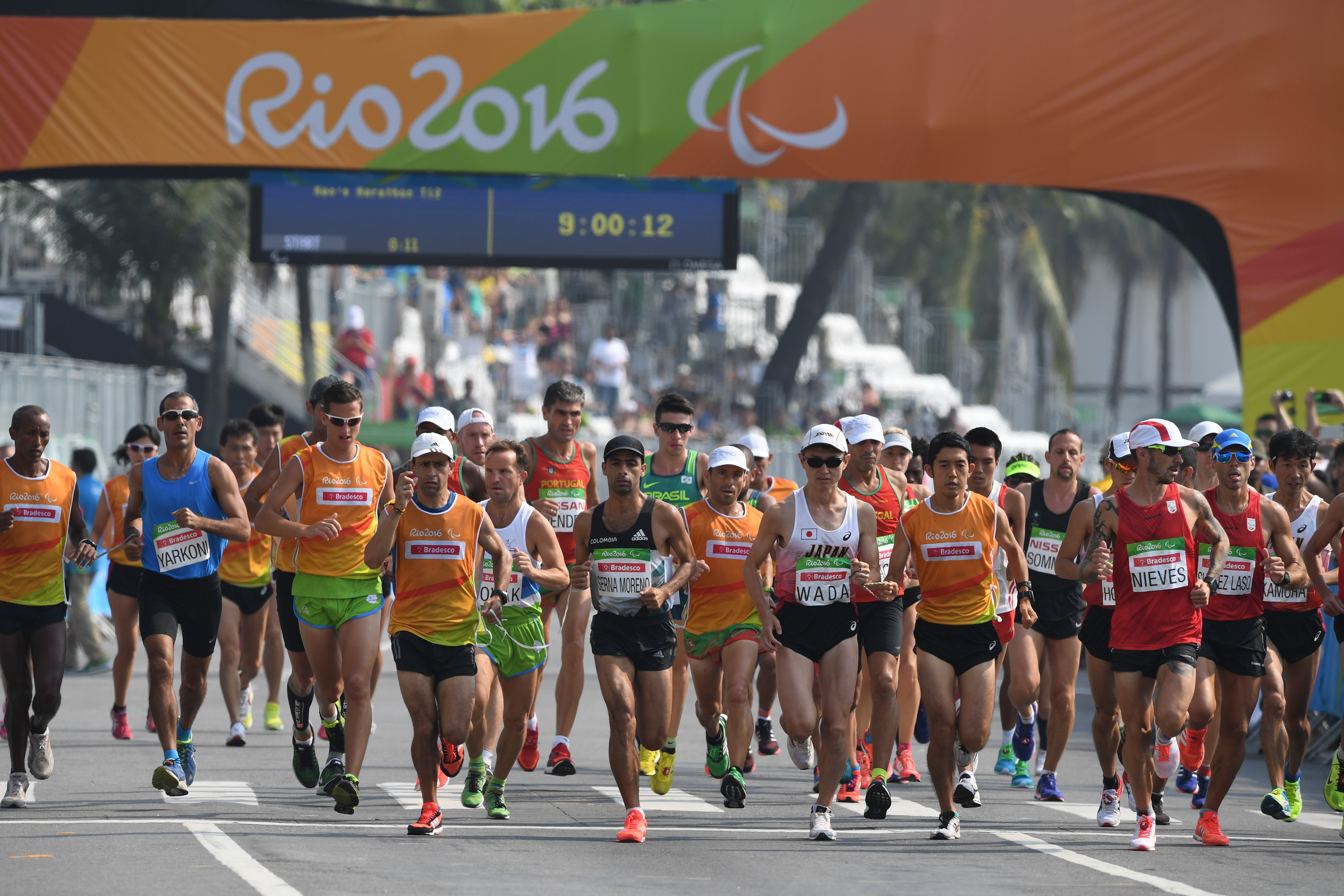
Rio 2016 Paralympics Marathon

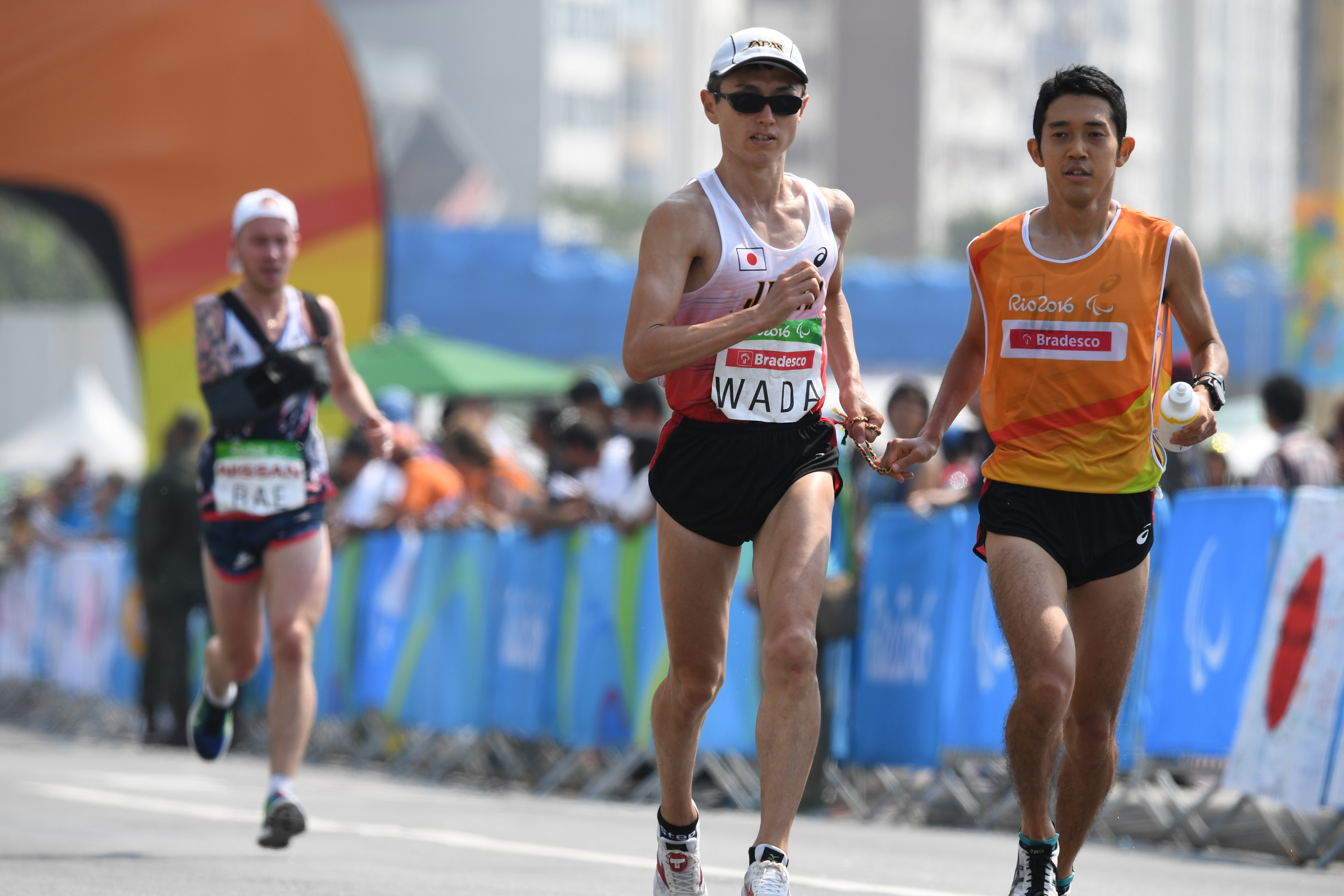
Rio 2016 Paralympics Marathon

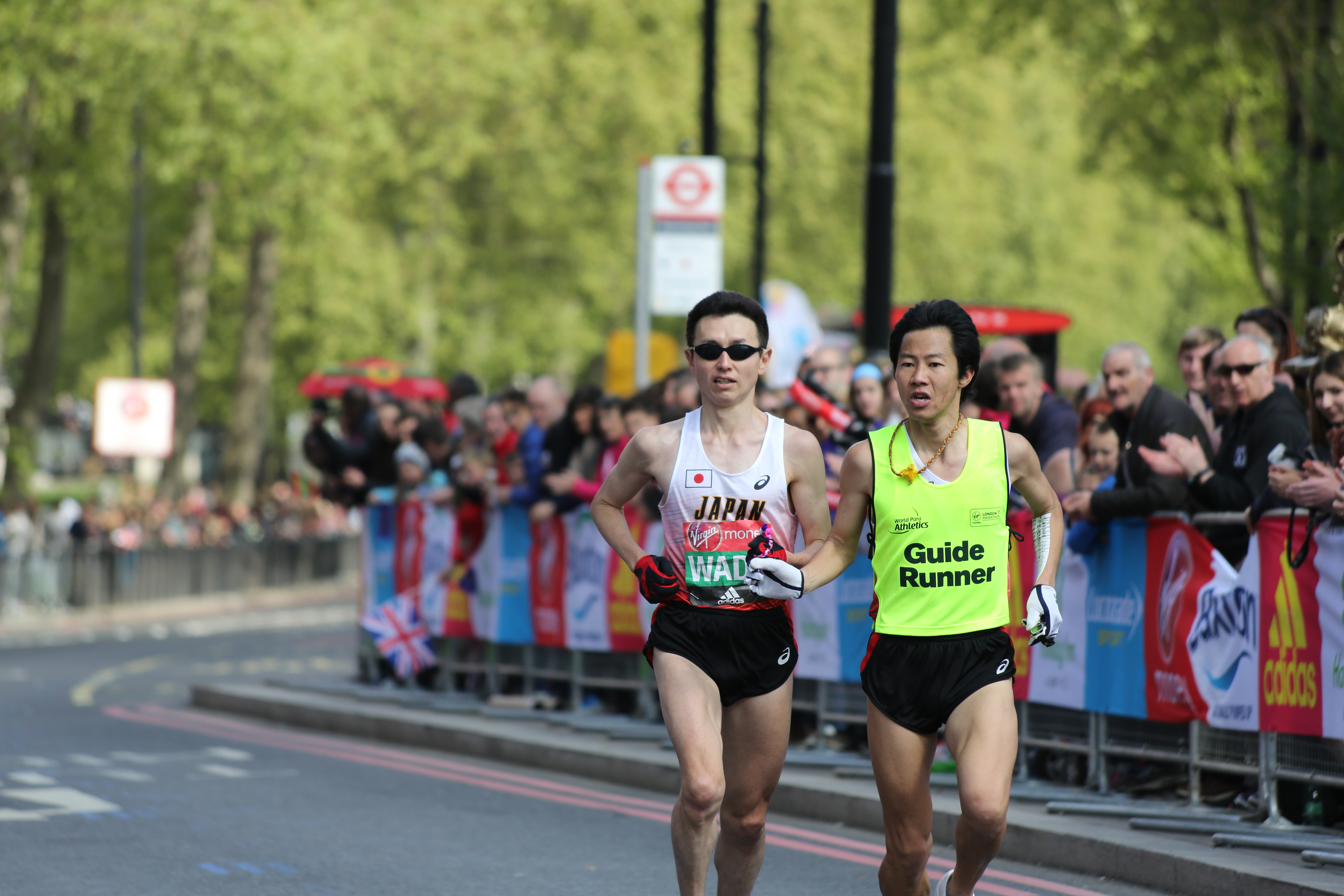
2017 World Para Athletics Marathon World Cup (London, UK)

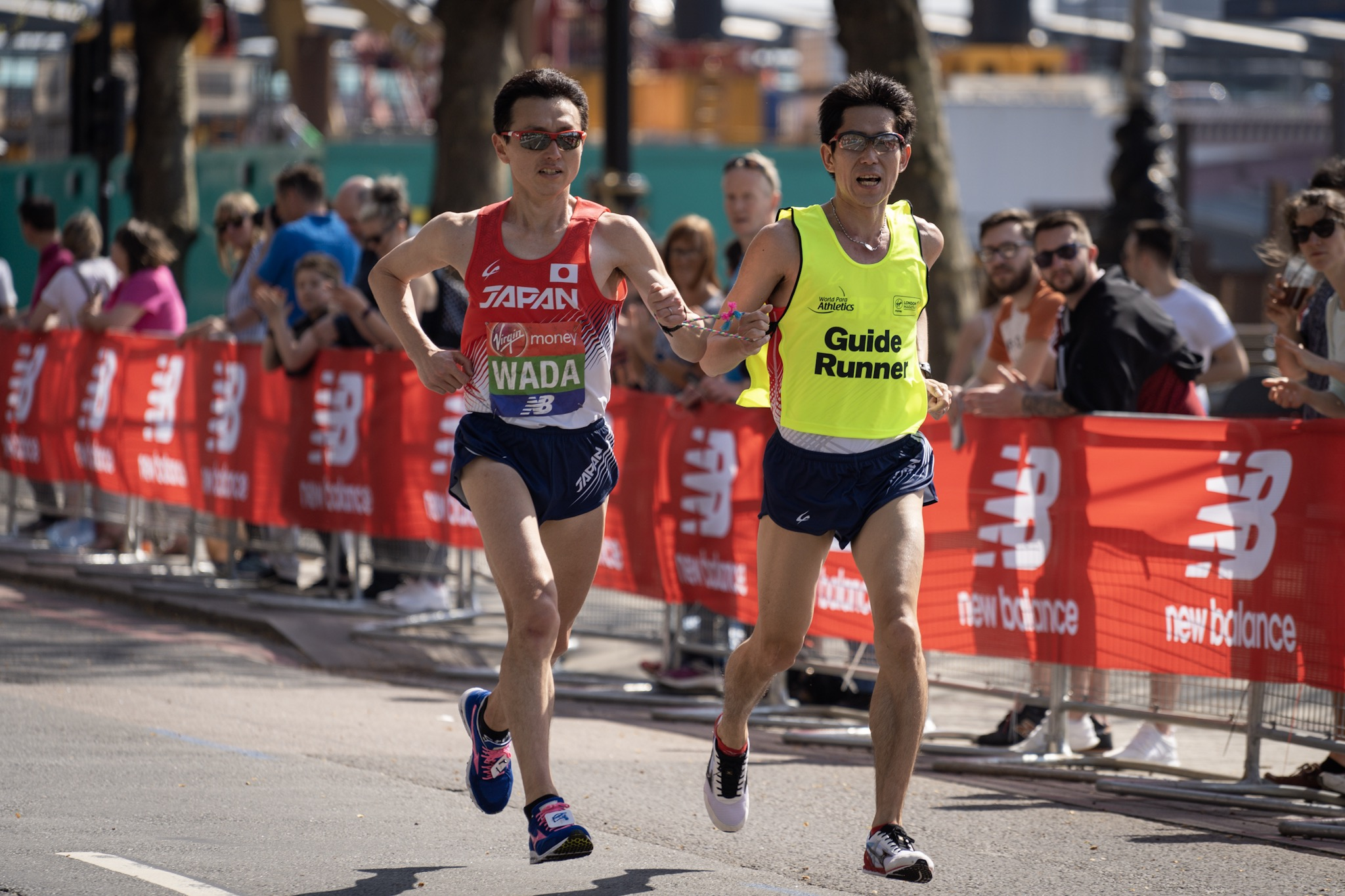
2018 World Para Athletics Marathon World Cup (London, UK)

== Results ==
=== World ===
Date	Competition	Venue	Position	Event	Time	Guide	Notes
January 2011	2011 IPC Athletics World Championships	Christchurch, New Zealand	4th	10000 m T11	34:21.89	Takashi Nakata	RR NR
January 2011	2011 IPC Athletics World Championships	Christchurch, New Zealand	3rd	Marathon T11	2:43:26	Takaaki Futami/Takashi Nakata	
August/September 2012	14th Summer Paralympic Games	London, United Kingdom	Heat	1500 m T11	4:18.71	Takashi Nakata	NR
August/September 2012	14th Summer Paralympic Games	London, United Kingdom	3rd	5000 m T11	15:55.26	Takashi Nakata	RR NR
August/September 2012	14th Summer Paralympic Games	London, United Kingdom	5th	Marathon T12	2:40:08	Atsushi Shida/Takashi Nakata	
July 2013	2013 IPC Athletics World Championships	Lyon, France	Heat	1500 m T11	DNF		
July 2013	2013 IPC Athletics World Championships	Lyon, France	4th	5000 m T11	16:20.91		
July 2013	2013 IPC Athletics World Championships	Lyon, France	2nd	Marathon T11	2:45:34	Atsushi Shida/Takashi Nakata	
May 2015	5th IBSA World Games	Seoul, South Korea	Heat	1500 m T11	4:42.78		
May 2015	5th IBSA World Games	Seoul, South Korea	2nd	5000 m T11	16:18.21	Takashi Nakata	
October 2015	2015 IPC Athletics World Championships	Doha, Qatar	3rd	5000 m T11	16:31.04	Takashi Nakata	
September 2016	15th Summer Paralympic Games	Rio de Janeiro, Brazil	Heat	1500 m T11	4:16.12	Takashi Nakata	NR
September 2016	15th Summer Paralympic Games	Rio de Janeiro, Brazil	6th	1500 m T11	4:15.62	Takashi Nakata	NR
September 2016	15th Summer Paralympic Games	Rio de Janeiro, Brazil	6th	5000 m T11	16:02.97	Takashi Nakata	
September 2016	15th Summer Paralympic Games	Rio de Janeiro, Brazil	5th	Marathon T12	2:39:52	Takehiko Gyoba/Takashi Nakata	
April 2017	2017 World Para Athletics Marathon World Cup in association with the Virgin Money London Marathon	London, United Kingdom	1st	Marathon T11/12	2:34:59		
July 2017	2017 World Para Athletics Championships	London, United Kingdom	Heat	1500 m T11	4:22.12	Koutaro Minowa	
July 2017	2017 World Para Athletics Championships	London, United Kingdom	3rd	5000 m T11	15:54.29	Koutaro Minowa	
April 2018	2018 World Para Athletics Marathon World Cup in association with the Virgin Money London Marathon	London, United Kingdom	5th	Marathon T11/12	2:42:18	Takashi Nakata/Yasunori Murakami	
GR Game Record | NR National Record | RR Regional Record

=== Regional ===
Date	Competition	Venue	Position	Event	Time	Guide	Notes
December 2010	2010 Asian Para Games	Guangzhou, China	4th	5000 m T12	17:18.18	Satoshi Kimura/Seiji Thuchida	
December 2010	2010 Asian Para Games	Guangzhou, China		10000 m T12	39:56.94	Masayuki Kakusho/Hitoshi Kinoshita	NM event
October 2014	2014 Asian Para Games	Incheon, South Korea	1st	800 m T11	2:08.97	Kazumitsu Imaki	GR
October 2014	2014 Asian Para Games	Incheon, South Korea	1st	1500 m T11	4:20.45	Kazumitsu Imaki	
October 2014	2014 Asian Para Games	Incheon, South Korea	1st	5000 m T11	16:20.48	Kazumitsu Imaki	GR
October 2018	2018 Asian Para Games	Jakarta, Indonesia	2nd	1500 m T11	4:22.87	Takashi Nakata	
October 2018	2018 Asian Para Games	Jakarta, Indonesia	2nd	5000 m T11	16:19.02	Takashi Nakata	
GR Game record

== Notes ==
=== References ===
- 卒業生の和田伸也さんがロンドン・パラリンピック陸上男子5000メートルで銅メダル、マラソンで5位入賞の快挙 (PDF). Reed (in Japanese) (31, November 2012). Kansai University Publicity Office: 15. 2012-11-29.
- Kazumitsu Imaki (2015-06-30). 走り続けて得た大切な出逢い. Cycas (in Japanese). Kansai Okura School and Kansai Okura Alumni. pp. 5–6.
