= Athletics at the 2024 Summer Paralympics =

Athletics at the XVII Paralympic Games
- Venue: Stade de France & Les Invalides, Paris
- Dates: 30 August – 8 September 2024
- Competitors: 1131 in 164 events from 152 nations

Athletics at the 2024 Summer Paralympics was held at the Stade de France and Les Invalides in Paris. There were 164 events: 90 for men, 73 for women and one mixed event, three fewer men's events than the previous Games while the women's and mixed events remain the same. It was the largest contest of the Games programme regarding athlete numbers and medal events to be scheduled.

== Classification and events ==
Participating athletes are given a classification depending on their disabilities (T denotes track events, F denotes field events). They are categorised into seven different classifications:

- T/F11–13: Blind (11) and visually impaired (12–13) athletes; track athletes would often run with a guide.
- T/F20: Athletes who have an intellectual disability.
- T/F 31–38: Athletes who have cerebral palsy or other coordination impairments. 31–34 for wheelchair events and 35–38 for running events.
- F40–41: Les Autres – typically for athletes who have dwarfism.
- T/F 42–47: Athletes who are amputees. In field events, some athletes would compete in seated events.
- T/F 51–58: Athletes who have a spinal cord injury or disability. In field events, most athletes would compete in seated events.
- T/F 61–64: Athletes who have a prosthesis affected by limb deficiency and leg length difference.

=== Event summary table ===
Athletics at the 2024 Summer Paralympics – Men's Events
Classification	Visual Impairment			ID	Cerebral Palsy athletes T32–34 Wheelchair : T35–38 Ambulant							RG		Amputee athletes						Wheelchair athletes Spinal injuries							Prosthesis athletes			
Event	T11	T12	T13	T20	T32	T33	T34	T35	T36	T37	T38	T40	T41	T42	T43	T44	T45	T46	T47	T51	T52	T53	T54	T55	T56	T57	T61	T62	T63	T64
Event	F11	F12	F13	F20	F32	F33	F34	F35	F36	F37	F38	F40	F41	F42	F43	F44	F45	F46	F47	F51	F52	F53	F54	F55	F56	F57	F61	F62	F63	F64
Track events
100 metres	●	●	●			>>	●	●	●	●	●					●	>>	>>	●	●	●	●	●					>>	●	●
200 metres								●		●										●										●
400 metres	●	●	●	●					●	●	●						>>	>>	●	>>	●	●	●					●		
800 metres						>>	●															●	●							
1500 metres	●	>>	●	●						>>	●						>>	●				>>	●							
5000 metres	●	>>	●																			>>	●							
Marathon	>>	●																			>>	>>	●							
Field events
High jump																	>>	>>	●										●	●
Long jump	●	●	●	●					●	●	●					>>	>>	>>	●										●	●
Shot put	●	●		●	●	●	●	●	●	●		●	●				>>	●				●	>>	●	>>	●	>>		●	
Discus	●									●										>>	●		>>	>>	●			>>		●
Javelin		>>	●			>>	●				●	>>	●				>>	●				>>	●		>>	●	>>	>>	>>	●
Club throw					●															●										

Athletics at the 2024 Summer Paralympics – Women's Events
Classification	Visual Impairment			ID	Cerebral Palsy athletes T32–34 Wheelchair : T35–38 Ambulant							RG		Amputee athletes						Wheelchair athletes Spinal injuries							Prosthesis athletes			
Event	T11	T12	T13	T20	T32	T33	T34	T35	T36	T37	T38	T40	T41	T42	T43	T44	T45	T46	T47	T51	T52	T53	T54	T55	T56	T57	T61	T62	T63	T64
Event	F11	F12	F13	F20	F32	F33	F34	F35	F36	F37	F38	F40	F41	F42	F43	F44	F45	F46	F47	F51	F52	F53	F54	F55	F56	F57	F61	F62	F63	F64
Track events
100 metres	●	●	●			>>	●	●	●	●	●					>>	>>	>>	●			●	●					>>	●	●
200 metres	●	●						●	●	●							>>	>>	●											●
400 metres	●	●	●	●						●	●						>>	>>	●			●	●							
800 metres						>>	●															●	●							
1500 metres	●	>>	●	●																		>>	●							
5000 metres																						>>	●							
Marathon	>>	●																			>>	>>	●							
Field events
Long Jump	●	●		●						●	●						>>	>>	●								>>		●	●
Shot Put	>>	●		●	●	●	●	●		●		●	●				>>	●					●		>>	●		>>	>>	●
Discus	●									>>	●	>>	●							>>	>>	●	>>	●	>>	●		>>		●
Javelin		>>	●			>>	●										>>	●				>>	●	>>	●					
Club throw					●																									

Athletics at the 2024 Summer Paralympics - Universal
Classification	Visual Impairment			ID	Cerebral Palsy athletes T32-34 Wheelchair : T35-38 Ambulant							RG		Amputee athletes						Wheelchair athletes Spinal injuries							Prosthesis athletes			
Event	T11	T12	T13	T20	T32	T33	T34	T35	T36	T37	T38	T40	T41	T42	T43	T44	T45	T46	T47	T51	T52	T53	T54	T55	T56	T57	T61	T62	T63	T64
4 × 100 metres relay	>>	>>	>>			>>	>>	>>	>>	>>	>>			>>	>>	>>	>>	>>	>>	>>	>>	>>	>>				>>	>>	>>	●

Key:
- ID : Classifications for intellectual disability
- RG : Les Autres classification, including dwarfism and restricted growth
- ● : Event in this classification
- >> : Competitors in this classification may take part in event for the next competed classification, e.g. T33 may compete in T34 event, or both T45 and T46 athletes may compete in a T47 event.

== Medal table ==
* Host nation (France)

Rank	NPC	Gold	Silver	Bronze	Total
1	China	21	22	16	59
–	Neutral Paralympic Athletes	11	6	10	27
2	United States	10	14	14	38
3	Brazil	10	11	15	36
4	Ukraine	8	6	5	19
5	Uzbekistan	8	4	4	16
6	Switzerland	7	4	2	13
7	Great Britain	6	8	4	18
8	Colombia	6	1	9	16
9	Netherlands	5	4	3	12
10	Tunisia	5	3	3	11
11	Canada	5	3	1	9
12	Cuba	5	1	1	7
13	India	4	6	7	17
14	Italy	4	3	1	8
15	Belgium	4	1	1	6
16	Algeria	4	0	3	7
17	Morocco	3	6	4	13
18	Iran	3	6	3	12
19	Australia	3	2	6	11
20	Azerbaijan	3	1	0	4
21	Thailand	2	5	1	8
22	Greece	2	2	3	7
23	Mexico	2	2	2	6
23	Poland	2	2	2	6
25	Venezuela	2	2	0	4
26	Ethiopia	2	1	0	3
27	Ecuador	2	0	3	5
28	South Africa	2	0	2	4
29	Costa Rica	2	0	0	2
30	Germany	1	3	4	8
31	New Zealand	1	3	2	6
32	Argentina	1	2	3	6
33	Hungary	1	2	0	3
34	Portugal	1	1	1	3
35	Latvia	1	1	0	2
36	Kuwait	1	0	1	2
36	Namibia	1	0	1	2
38	Bulgaria	1	0	0	1
38	Georgia	1	0	0	1
38	Saudi Arabia	1	0	0	1
41	Japan	0	4	5	9
42	Spain	0	3	4	7
43	France*	0	3	2	5
44	Denmark	0	2	1	3
44	Malaysia	0	2	1	3
44	Turkey	0	2	1	3
47	Indonesia	0	2	0	2
48	Finland	0	1	3	4
49	Croatia	0	1	1	2
49	Serbia	0	1	1	2
51	Kenya	0	1	0	1
51	Mongolia	0	1	0	1
51	Nigeria	0	1	0	1
51	Norway	0	1	0	1
51	Sri Lanka	0	1	0	1
51	Trinidad and Tobago	0	1	0	1
57	Iraq	0	0	2	2
58	Austria	0	0	1	1
58	Ireland	0	0	1	1
58	Jordan	0	0	1	1
58	Kazakhstan	0	0	1	1
58	Luxembourg	0	0	1	1
58	Mauritius	0	0	1	1
58	Pakistan	0	0	1	1
58	Refugee Paralympic Team	0	0	1	1
Totals (65 entries)		164	165	166	495

== Participating nations ==
- Algeria (20)
- Angola (2)
- Argentina (19)
- Armenia (2)
- Australia (32)
- Austria (3)
- Azerbaijan (5)
- Bahrain (2)
- Belgium (7)
- Benin (2)
- Bermuda (1)
- Botswana (2)
- Brazil (71)
- Bulgaria (3)
- Burkina Faso (1)
- Burundi (2)
- Cambodia (1)
- Cameroon (2)
- Canada (20)
- Cape Verde (2)
- Central African Republic (1)
- Chile (3)
- China (61)
- Chinese Taipei (1)
- Colombia (28)
- Costa Rica (2)
- Croatia (10)
- Cuba (9)
- Cyprus (1)
- Czech Republic (8)
- Democratic Republic of the Congo (2)
- Denmark (4)
- Dominican Republic (4)
- Timor-Leste (1)
- Ecuador (11)
- Egypt (2)
- Eritrea (1)
- Estonia (1)
- Ethiopia (4)
- Fiji (2)
- Finland (8)
- France (27) Host
- Gabon (2)
- Georgia (2)
- Germany (27)
- Ghana (1)
- Great Britain (33)
- Greece (14)
- Grenada (2)
- Guatemala (1)
- Guinea (2)
- Guinea-Bissau (2)
- Haiti (1)
- Hong Kong (1)
- Hungary (5)
- Iceland (1)
- India (38)
- Indonesia (5)
- Iran (20)
- Iraq (6)
- Ireland (5)
- Italy (15)
- Ivory Coast (1)
- Jamaica (1)
- Japan (40)
- Jordan (1)
- Kazakhstan (4)
- Kenya (8)
- Kiribati (1)
- Kosovo (1)
- Kuwait (3)
- Kyrgyzstan (1)
- Laos (1)
- Latvia (4)
- Lebanon (1)
- Lesotho (2)
- Liberia (2)
- Libya (2)
- Lithuania (5)
- Luxembourg (2)
- Macau (1)
- Malawi (2)
- Malaysia (6)
- Maldives (2)
- Mali (2)
- Malta (1)
- Mauritius (6)
- Mexico (25)
- Moldova (1)
- Mongolia (2)
- Montenegro (1)
- Morocco (17)
- Mozambique (1)
- Myanmar (1)
- Namibia (5)
- Netherlands (14)
- Neutral Paralympic Athletes (48)
- New Zealand (6)
- Nicaragua (1)
- Nigeria (5)
- Norway (3)
- Oman (2)
- Pakistan (1)
- Palestine (1)
- Panama (1)
- Paraguay (1)
- Peru (2)
- Philippines (2)
- Poland (25)
- Portugal (6)
- Puerto Rico (2)
- Qatar (2)
- Refugee Paralympic Team (2)
- Republic of the Congo (2)
- Rwanda (1)
- São Tomé and Príncipe (1)
- Saudi Arabia (5)
- Senegal (1)
- Serbia (6)
- Sierra Leone (1)
- Singapore (1)
- Slovakia (3)
- Slovenia (1)
- Solomon Islands (1)
- Somalia (1)
- South Africa (15)
- South Korea (3)
- Spain (23)
- Sri Lanka (6)
- Suriname (1)
- Switzerland (10)
- Syria (1)
- Tanzania (1)
- Thailand (15)
- The Gambia (2)
- Togo (1)
- Tonga (1)
- Trinidad and Tobago (1)
- Tunisia (25)
- Turkey (15)
- Uganda (2)
- Ukraine (27)
- United Arab Emirates (5)
- United States (55)
- Uzbekistan (25)
- Vanuatu (2)
- Venezuela (15)
- Vietnam (1)
- Virgin Islands (1)
- Yemen (1)
- Zambia (2)
- Zimbabwe (2)

== See also ==
- Athletics at the 2024 Summer Olympics
