= Athletics at the 2024 Summer Paralympics – Men's 200 metres =

Athletics – Men's 200 metres at the XVII Paralympic Games
- Venue: Stade de France
- Dates: 3 – 7 September 2024
- No. of events: 4

200 metres at the 2024 Summer Paralympics
Men · T35 · T37 · T51 · T64
Women · T11 · T12 · T35 · T36 · T37 · T47 · T64

The Men's 200m athletics events for the 2024 Summer Paralympics will take place at the Stade de France from 3 to 7 September 2024. A total of 4 events will be contested over this distance.

== Schedule ==
R	Round 1	F	Final

Date	Tue 3		Wed 4		Thu 5		Fri 6		Sat 7	
Event	M	E	M	E	M	E	M	E	M	E
T35 200m							R		F	
T37 200m								R	F	
T51 200m	F									
T64 200m									R	F

== Medal summary ==
The following is a summary of the medals awarded across all 200 metres events.

Classification	Gold		Silver		Bronze	
T35	Ihor Tsvietov; Ukraine	23.19 SB	Dmitrii Safronov; Neutral Paralympic Athletes	23.78	Artem Kalashian; Neutral Paralympic Athletes	23.88
T37	Andrei Vdovin; Neutral Paralympic Athletes	22.69 SB	Ricardo Gomes de Mendonça; Brazil	22.71 SB	Christian Gabriel Costa; Brazil	22.74 PB
T51	Cody Fournie; Canada	37.64 PB	Toni Piispanen; Finland	38.55 SB	Peter Genyn; Belgium	38.65
T64	Sherman Guity; Costa Rica	21.32 PR	Levi Vloet; Netherlands	21.86 PB	Mpumelelo Mhlongo; South Africa	22.62 WR

== Results ==
The following were the results of the finals only of each of the Men's 200 metres events in each of the classifications. Further details of each event, including where appropriate heats and semi finals results, are available on that event's dedicated page.

=== T35 ===
The T35 category is for ambulant athletes with cerebral palsy. The typical T35 athlete may need assistive devices for walking. The athlete may have sufficient function to run but demonstrates poor balance.

The final in this classification took place on 7 September 2024, at 10:30:

Rank	Lane	Athlete	Nation	Time	Notes
1st place, gold medalist(s)	7	Ihor Tsvietov	Ukraine	23.19	SB
2nd place, silver medalist(s)	6	Dmitrii Safronov	Neutral Paralympic Athletes	23.78	
3rd place, bronze medalist(s)	4	Artem Kalashian	Neutral Paralympic Athletes	23.88	
4	9	Henrique Nascimento	Brazil	24.14	AR
5	2	Ivan Tetiukhin	Ukraine	24.87	PB
6	5	Maximiliano Villa	Argentina	25.10	
7	3	Hernan Barreto	Argentina	25.53	SB
8	8	David Dzhatiev	Neutral Paralympic Athletes	26.02	
9	1	Fabio Bordignon	Brazil	29.71	SB
				Wind: 0.0 m/s	

=== T37 ===
The T37 category is for ambulant athletes with cerebral palsy. These athletes have movement and coordination problems on one half of their body. They have good ability in their dominant side of their body (ie hemiplegia).

The final in this classification will take place on 7 September 2024, at 10:40:

Rank	Lane	Athlete	Nation	Time	Notes
1st place, gold medalist(s)	9	Andrei Vdovin	Neutral Paralympic Athletes	22.69	SB
2nd place, silver medalist(s)	3	Ricardo Gomes de Mendonça	Brazil	22.71	SB
3rd place, bronze medalist(s)	7	Christian Gabriel Costa	Brazil	22.74	PB
4	5	Bartolomeu Chaves	Brazil	23.22	PB
5	6	Saptoyogo Purnomo	Indonesia	23.26	PB
6	4	Michal Kotkowski	Poland	23.41	
7	8	Ali Aklnakhli	Saudi Arabia	23.44	
8	2	Mykola Raiskyi	Ukraine	23.91	
				Wind: +0.3 m/s	

=== T51 ===
The T51 category is for wheelchair athletes having spinal cord injuries, with mild weakness in shoulders, limited ability in straightening elbows and wrist function, and no finger, trunk or leg function.

The final in this classification took place on 3 September 2024, at 10:45:

Rank	Lane	Name	Nationality	Time	Notes
1st place, gold medalist(s)	4	Cody Fournie	Canada	37.64	PB
2nd place, silver medalist(s)	7	Toni Piispanen	Finland	38.55	SB
3rd place, bronze medalist(s)	8	Peter Genyn	Belgium	38.65	
4	9	Mohamed Berrahal	Algeria	40.91	
5	6	Roger Habsch	Belgium	42.35	
6	5	Edgar Cesareo Navarro Sanchez	Mexico	42.92	SB
7	3	Ernesto Fonseca	Costa Rica	46.10	SB
				Wind: -0.7 m/s	

=== T64 ===
The T64 Category is for athletes with unilateral below knee limb deficiency competing with a prosthesis.

The final in this classification took place on 7 September 2024, at 19:50:

Rank	Lane	Class	Athlete	Nation	Time	Notes
1st place, gold medalist(s)	6	T64	Sherman Guity	Costa Rica	21.32	PR
2nd place, silver medalist(s)	9	T64	Levi Vloet	Netherlands	22.47	PB
3rd place, bronze medalist(s)	7	T44	Mpumelelo Mhlongo	South Africa	22.62	WR
4	5	T44	Wallison Andre Fortes	Brazil	22.84	
5	3	T64	Michail Seitis	Greece	23.16	
6	4	T64	Mitchell Joynt	New Zealand	23.16	
7	2	T64	Shunsuke Itani	Japan	23.50	SB
—	8	T44	Felix Streng	Germany	DQ	R18.2(c)
					Wind: +0.5 m/s	
