= Athletics at the 2024 Summer Paralympics – Men's 5000 metres =

Athletics – Men's 5000 metres at the XVII Paralympic Games
- Venue: Stade de France
- Dates: 30 – 31 August 2024
- No. of events: 3
- Competitors: 30

5000 metres at the 2024 Summer Paralympics
Men's · T11 · T13 · T54 · Women's · T54

The Men's 5000m athletics events for the 2024 Summer Paralympics took place at the Stade de France from 30 to 31 August 2024. A total of 3 events were contested over this distance.

== Schedule ==
R	Round 1	F	Final

Date	Fri 30		Sat 31	
Event	M	E	M	E
T11 5000m	F			
T13 5000m			F	
T54 5000m		R		F

== Medal summary ==
The following is a summary of the medals awarded across all 5000 metres events.

Classification	Gold		Silver		Bronze	
T11	Júlio Cesar Agripino; Brazil	14:48.85 WR	Kenya Karasawa; Japan	14:51.48 AR	Yeltsin Jacques; Brazil	14:52.61
T13	Yassine Ouhdadi El Ataby; Spain	15:50.64	Aleksandr Kostin; Neutral Paralympic Athletes	15:52.36	Anton Kuliatin; Neutral Paralympic Athletes	15:55.23
T54	Daniel Romanchuk; United States	10:55.28	Marcel Hug; Switzerland	10:55.77	Faisal Alrajehi; Kuwait	10:55.99

=== T11 ===
The T11 category is for athletes with a visual impairment. A T11 athlete may be entirely without sight, or be able to perceive light, but have no ability to see the shape of a hand at any distance. T11 athletes commonly run with guides.

The final in this classification took place on 30 August 2024, at 10:06:

Rank	Name	Nationality	Time	Notes
1st place, gold medalist(s)	Júlio Cesar Agripino; Guide: Micael Batista Santos; Guide: Edelson de Ávila Almeida	Brazil	14:48.85	WR
2nd place, silver medalist(s)	Kenya Karasawa; Guide: Takuma Shimizu; Guide: Koji Kobayashi	Japan	14:51.48	AR
3rd place, bronze medalist(s)	Yeltsin Jacques; Guide: Guilherme dos Anjos; Guide: Antônio Barreto	Brazil	14:52.61	PB
4	Shinya Wada; Guide: Hibiki Kowada; Guide: Takumi Hasebe	Japan	15:16.41	
5	Jimmy Caicedo; Guide: Israel Arellano; Guide: Daniel Taramuel	Ecuador	15:24.69	
6	Rosbil Guillen; Guide: José Luis Rojas	Peru	15:28.62	
7	Darwin Castro; Guide: Sebastián Rosero; Guide: Diego Arévalo	Ecuador	15:50.65	
—	Fedor Rudakov; Guide: Andrei Safronov	Neutral Paralympic Athletes	DNF	
—	Samwel Mushai Kimani; Guide: Benard Korir; Guide: Jean Kipchumba	Kenya	DQ	R7.12.2

=== T13 ===
The T13 category is for athletes with a moderate visual impairment. Athletes in this category have a variety of visual impairments, but can typically recognize contours from a distance of 2 to 6 metres. Athletes in this category do not typically require a guide.

The final in this classification took place on 31 August 2024, at 10:14:

Rank	Name	Nationality	Time	Notes
1st place, gold medalist(s)	Yassine Ouhdadi El Ataby	Spain	15:50.64	
2nd place, silver medalist(s)	Aleksandr Kostin	Neutral Paralympic Athletes	15:52.36	
3rd place, bronze medalist(s)	Anton Kuliatin	Neutral Paralympic Athletes	15:55.23	
4	Sixto Roman Moreta Criollo	Ecuador	16:06.79	
5	Guillaume Ouellet	Canada	16:07.71	
6	John Lokedi	Kenya	16:10.06	
7	Mikail Al	Turkey	16:12.45	
—	Jaryd Clifford	Australia	DQ	R7.9.5

=== T54 ===
The T54 category is for wheelchair athletes with no leg function, but near full arm function and reasonable to normal trunk function. Typically this may be caused by a lower spinal cord injury or spinal cord birth defect.

The final in this classification took place on 31 August 2024, at 20:39:

Rank	Name	Nationality	Time	Notes
1st place, gold medalist(s)	Daniel Romanchuk	United States	10:55.28	
2nd place, silver medalist(s)	Marcel Hug	Switzerland	10:55.78	
3rd place, bronze medalist(s)	Faisal Alrajehi	Kuwait	10:55.99	
4	Ma Zhuo	China	10:56.20	SB
5	Saichon Konjen	Thailand	10:56.26	
6	Luo Xingchuan	China	10:56.48	SB
7	Brent Lakatos	Canada	10:56.73	
8	David Weir	Great Britain	10:56.88	
9	Brian Siemann	United States	12:47.92	
—	Putharet Khongrak	Thailand	DNF	
