= Athletics at the 2024 Summer Paralympics – Women's 200 metres =

Athletics – Women's 200 metres at the XVII Paralympic Games
- Venue: Stade de France
- Dates: 30 August – 7 September 2024
- No. of events: 7

200 metres at the 2024 Summer Paralympics
Men · T35 · T37 · T51 · T64
Women · T11 · T12 · T35 · T36 · T37 · T47 · T64

The Women's 200m athletics events for the 2024 Summer Paralympics took place at the Stade de France from 30 August to 7 September, 2024. A total of 7 events were contested over this distance.

== Schedule ==
R	Round 1	½	Semifinals	F	Final

Date	Fri 30		Sat 31		Sun 1		Mon 2		Tue 3		Wed 4		Thu 5		Fri 6		Sat 7	
Event	M	E	M	E	M	E	M	E	M	E	M	E	M	E	M	E	M	E
T11 200m													R		½			F
T12 200m																R		F
T35 200m						F												
T36 200m				R	F													
T37 200m	R	F																
T47 200m																	R	F
T64 200m									R	F								

== Medal summary ==
The following is a summary of the medals awarded across all 200 metres events.

Classification	Gold		Silver		Bronze	
T11	Jerusa Geber dos Santos; Brazil; Guide: Gabriel Aparecido dos Santos	24.51 PR	Liu Cuiqing; China; Guide: Chen Shengming	24.86	Lahja Ishitile; Namibia; Guide: Sem Shimanda	25.04
T12	Omara Durand; Cuba; Guide: Yuniol Kindelan Vargas	23.62 SB	Alejandra Paola Pérez López; Venezuela	24.19 PB	Simran Sharma; India; Guide: Abhay Singh	24.75 PB
T35	Zhou Xia; China	28.15	Guo Qianqian; China	29.09	Preethi Pal; India	30.01
T36	Shi Yiting; China	27.50 PR	Danielle Aitchison; New Zealand	27.64	Mali Lovell; Australia	29.82
T37	Wen Xiaoyan; China	25.86 PR	Nataliia Kobzar; Ukraine	27.43	Jiang Fenfen; China	27.55
T47	Anna Grimaldi; New Zealand	24.72 AR	Brittni Mason; United States	25.18	Sasirawan Inthachot; Thailand	25.20 SB
T64	Kimberly Alkemade; Netherlands	25.42	Marlene van Gansewinkel; Netherlands	26.14	Irmgard Bensusan; Germany	26.77

== Results ==
The following were the results of the finals only of each of the Women's 200 metres events in each of the classifications. Further details of each event, including where appropriate heats and semi finals results, are available on that event's dedicated page.

=== T11 ===
The T11 category is for athletes with a visual impairment. A T11 athlete may be entirely without sight, or be able to perceive light, but have no ability to see the shape of a hand at any distance. T11 athletes commonly run with guides.

The final in this classification took place on 7 September 2024, at 19:23:

Rank	Lane	Athlete	Nation	Time	Notes
1st place, gold medalist(s)	5	Jerusa Geber dos Santos; Guide: Gabriel Aparecido dos Santos	Brazil	24.51	=PR
2nd place, silver medalist(s)	3	Liu Cuiqing; Guide: Chen Shengming	China	24.86	
3rd place, bronze medalist(s)	7	Lahja Ishitile; Guide: Sem Shimanda	Namibia	25.04	
4	1	Linda Patricia Perez Lopez; Guide: Alvaro Luis Cassiano Herrera	Venezuela	25.44	
				Wind: +0.5m/s	

=== T12 ===
The T12 category is for athletes with visual impairment. Athletes in this category will generally have some residual sight, the ability to recognise the shape of a hand at a distance of 2 metres and the ability to perceive clearly will be no more than 2/60. T12 athletes commonly run with guides.

The final in this classification took place on 7 September 2024, at 19:33:

Rank	Lane	Athlete	Nation	Time	Notes
1st place, gold medalist(s)	3	Omara Durand; Guide: Yuniol Kindelan Vargas	Cuba	23.62	SB
2nd place, silver medalist(s)	5	Alejandra Paola Pérez López	Venezuela	24.19	PB
3rd place, bronze medalist(s)	7	Simran Sharma; Guide: Abhay Singh	India	24.75	PB
4	1	Hajar Safarzadeh	Iran	24.91	PB
				Wind: -0.9 m/s	

=== T35 ===
The T35 category is for ambulant athletes with cerebral palsy. The typical T35 athlete may need assistive devices for walking. The athlete may have sufficient function to run but demonstrates poor balance.

The final in this classification took place on 1 September 2024, at 19:57:

Rank	Lane	Name	Nationality	Time	Notes
1st place, gold medalist(s)	6	Zhou Xia	China	28.15	SB
2nd place, silver medalist(s)	8	Guo Qianqian	China	29.09	PB
3rd place, bronze medalist(s)	7	Preethi Pal	India	30.01	PB
4	5	Fatimah Suwaed	Iraq	31.06	PB
5	4	Ingrid Renecka	Poland	31.79	PB
6	9	Jagoda Kibil	Poland	32.13	
7	3	Isabelle Foerder	Germany	34.39	
				Wind: -0.1 m/s	

=== T36 ===
The T36 category is for ambulant athletes with cerebral palsy. These athletes do not have the capacity to remain still and they show involuntary movements with all four limbs affected. They usually walk without assistive devices.

The final in this classification took place on 1 September 2024, at 12:23:

Rank	Lane	Name	Nationality	Time	Notes
1st place, gold medalist(s)	6	Shi Yiting	China	27.50	PR, AR
2nd place, silver medalist(s)	7	Danielle Aitchison	New Zealand	27.64	
3rd place, bronze medalist(s)	8	Mali Lovell	Australia	29.82	
4	4	Araceli Rotela	Argentina	29.89	AR
5	3	Jeon Min-jae	South Korea	30.76	SB
6	9	Samira da Silva Brito	Brazil	31.01	
7	5	Veronica Hipolito	Brazil	31.03	
8	2	Nicole Nicoleitzik	Germany	31.72	
				Wind: -0.3 m/s	

=== T37 ===
The T37 category is for ambulant athletes with cerebral palsy. These athletes have movement and coordination problems on one half of their body. They have good ability in their dominant side of their body (ie hemiplegia).

The final in this classification took place on 30 August 2024, at 19:57:

Rank	Lane	Name	Nationality	Time	Notes
1st place, gold medalist(s)	8	Wen Xiaoyan	China	25.86	PR
2nd place, silver medalist(s)	9	Nataliia Kobzar	Ukraine	27.43	SB
3rd place, bronze medalist(s)	6	Jiang Fenfen	China	27.55	
4	2	Jaleen Roberts	United States	27.99	SB
5	5	Mandy Francois-Elie	France	28.20	
6	3	Viktoriia Slanova	Neutral Paralympic Athletes	28.53	
7	4	Sheryl James	South Africa	29.08	
8	1	Aorawan Chimpaen	Thailand	33.04	
9	7	Taylor Swanson	United States	44.85	
				Wind: +0.1 m/s	

=== T47 ===
The T47 category is for athletes who have a single below elbow or wrist amputation or similar disability, with normal function in both legs.

The final in this classification took place on 7 September 2024, at 19:43:

Rank	Lane	Class	Athlete	Nation	Time	Notes
1st place, gold medalist(s)	7	T47	Anna Grimaldi	New Zealand	24.71	AR
2nd place, silver medalist(s)	8	T46	Brittni Mason	United States	25.18	
3rd place, bronze medalist(s)	4	T47	Sasirawan Inthachot	Thailand	25.20	SB
4	6	T47	Fernanda Yara da Silva	Brazil	25.35	PB
5	3	T47	Maria Clara Augusto da Silva	Brazil	25.71	
6	2	T47	Sheriauna Haase	Canada	25.76	
7	5	T47	Anastasiia Soloveva	Neutral Paralympic Athletes	26.05	
8	9	T46	Li Lu	China	25.66	
					Wind: -0.3m/s	

=== T64 ===
The T64 Category is for athletes with unilateral below knee limb deficiency competing with a prosthesis.

The final in this classification took place on 3 September 2024, at 19:53:

Rank	Lane	Name	Nationality	Time	Notes
1st place, gold medalist(s)	8	Kimberly Alkemade	Netherlands	25.42	PR
2nd place, silver medalist(s)	6	Marlene van Gansewinkel	Netherlands	26.14	
3rd place, bronze medalist(s)	7	Irmgard Bensusan	Germany	26.77	SB
4	9	Marissa Papaconstantinou	Canada	27.30	
5	3	Beatriz Hatz	United States	27.45	
6	5	Annie Carey	United States	27.62	T44 AR
7	4	Fiona Pinar Batalla	Spain	27.87	
8	2	Anna Steven	New Zealand	29.37	
				Wind: +0.5 m/s	
