= Athletics at the 2024 Summer Paralympics – Men's 5000 metres T11 =

Men's 5000 metres T11 at the XVII Paralympic Games
- Venue: Stade de France
- Dates: 30 August 2024
- Competitors: 9 from 6 nations
- Winning time: 14:48.85

Medalists
1st place, gold medalist(s)		Júlio Cesar Agripino; Guide: Micael Batista Santos; Guide: Edelson de Ávila Almeida	Brazil
2nd place, silver medalist(s)		Kenya Karasawa; Guide: Takuma Shimizu; Guide: Koji Kobayashi	Japan
3rd place, bronze medalist(s)		Yeltsin Jacques; Guide: Guilherme dos Anjos; Guide: Antônio Barreto	Brazil

5000 metres at the 2024 Summer Paralympics
Men's · T11 · T13 · T54 · Women's · T54

The men's 5000 metres T11 event at the 2024 Summer Paralympics in Paris, took place on 30 August 2024.

The T11 category is for athletes with a visual impairment. A T11 athlete may be entirely without sight, or be able to perceive light, but have no ability to see the shape of a hand at any distance. T11 athletes commonly run with guides. In the 5000 metres, each athlete commonly has two guides.

== Records ==
Prior to the competition, the existing records were as follows:

World Record	Yeltsin Jacques (BRA)	14:53.97	(Japan) Kobe	17 May 2024
Paralympic Record	Henry Wanyoike (KEN)	15:11.07	(Greece) Athens	24 September 2004

Area	Time		Athlete	Location	Date
Africa	15:11.07	PR	(Kenya) Henry Wanyoike	(Greece) Athens	24 September 2004
America	14:53.97	WR	(Brazil) Yeltsin Jacques	(Japan) Kobe	17 May 2024
Asia	14:55.39		(Japan) Kenya Karasawa	(Japan) Yokohama	25 December 2021
Europe	15:13.10		(Russia) Fedor Rudakov	(Russia) Cheboksary	15 August 2023
Oceania	17:29.33		(Australia) Gerrard Gosens	(Australia) Townsville	26 September 2003

== Final ==
Final starts on 30 August 2024.

Rank	Name	Nationality	Time	Notes
1st place, gold medalist(s)	Júlio Cesar Agripino; Guide: Micael Batista Santos; Guide: Edelson de Ávila Almeida	Brazil	14:48.85	WR
2nd place, silver medalist(s)	Kenya Karasawa; Guide: Takuma Shimizu; Guide: Koji Kobayashi	Japan	14:51.48	AsR
3rd place, bronze medalist(s)	Yeltsin Jacques; Guide: Guilherme dos Anjos; Guide: Antônio Barreto	Brazil	14:52.61	PB
4	Shinya Wada; Guide: Hibiki Kowada; Guide: Takumi Hasebe	Japan	15:16.41	
5	Jimmy Caicedo; Guide: Israel Arellano; Guide: Daniel Taramuel	Ecuador	15:24.69	
6	Rosbil Guillen; Guide: José Luis Rojas	Peru	15:28.62	
7	Darwin Castro; Guide: Sebastián Rosero; Guide: Diego Arévalo	Ecuador	15:50.65	
—	Fedor Rudakov; Guide: Andrei Safronov	Neutral Paralympic Athletes	DNF	
—	Samwel Mushai Kimani; Guide: Benard Korir; Guide: Jean Kipchumba	Kenya	DQ	R7.12.2
