= Athletics at the 2026 Commonwealth Games – Women's 100 metres (T47) =

Women's 100 metres (T47) at the 2026 Commonwealth Games
- Venue: Scotstoun Stadium, Glasgow
- Dates: 30 July 2026 (final)
- Competitors: 8 from 7 nations
- Winning time: 12.23

Medalists
gold medal	Sheriauna Haase	Canada
silver medal	Chloe Dunbar	Canada
bronze medal	Anna Grimaldi	New Zealand

The women's 100 metres (T47) event at the 2026 Commonwealth Games, also referred to as the women's 100 metres T45-47 event, as part of the para-athletics programme, will take place at the Scotstoun Stadium on 30 July 2026.

The event is open to ambulant female para-athletes in the T45, T46 and T47 classifications for para-athletes with an amputation or similar condition. This will be the first edition of this specific event.

== Schedule ==
The schedule is as follows:

Date	Time	Round
30 July 2026	19:34	Final

All times are United Kingdom time (UTC+1)

== Qualification ==
Para athletic event qualification is regulated by a special system organised between Commonwealth Sport and the International Paralympic Committee. Each para athletic event allowed for eight quota places, or 10 in the case of throwing events. All but one quota in each event was available on the basis of the Commonwealth Para Rankings on 31 Match 2026, to a maximum of two per Commonwealth Games Association (CGA), with the remaining quota allocated by Bipartite invitation.

This list did not set a limit on entrants, as other athletes in the same classification, but qualified directly for another event, could enter the event in question, up to a maximum (combined quota, invitation and 'separate event' quota) of three per event per CGA.

== Entrants ==
The following national associations have entered athletes in this event. Further athletes may be entered before the event is commenced:

- Australia (1)
- New Zealand (1)
- Canada (2)

== Results ==
The final of the women's 100 metres (T47) is scheduled for the evening session of 30 July 2026

Place	Lane	Athlete	Nation	Time	Notes
1st place, gold medalist(s)	6	Sheriauna Haase	Canada	12.23	PB
2nd place, silver medalist(s)	1	Chloe Dunbar	Canada	12.33	PB
3rd place, bronze medalist(s)	3	Anna Grimaldi	New Zealand	12.46	SB
4	5	Janani Wickramasingha	Sri Lanka	12.50	PB
5	2	Unyima Uwak	Nigeria	12.63	SB
6	8	Neema Obonyo	Kenya	12.77	PB
7	4	Lexie Brown	Australia	13.15	SB
8	7	Clémentine Uwiduhaye	Rwanda	13.85	PB
