= Antoine Praud =

French Paralympic athlete (born 2003)

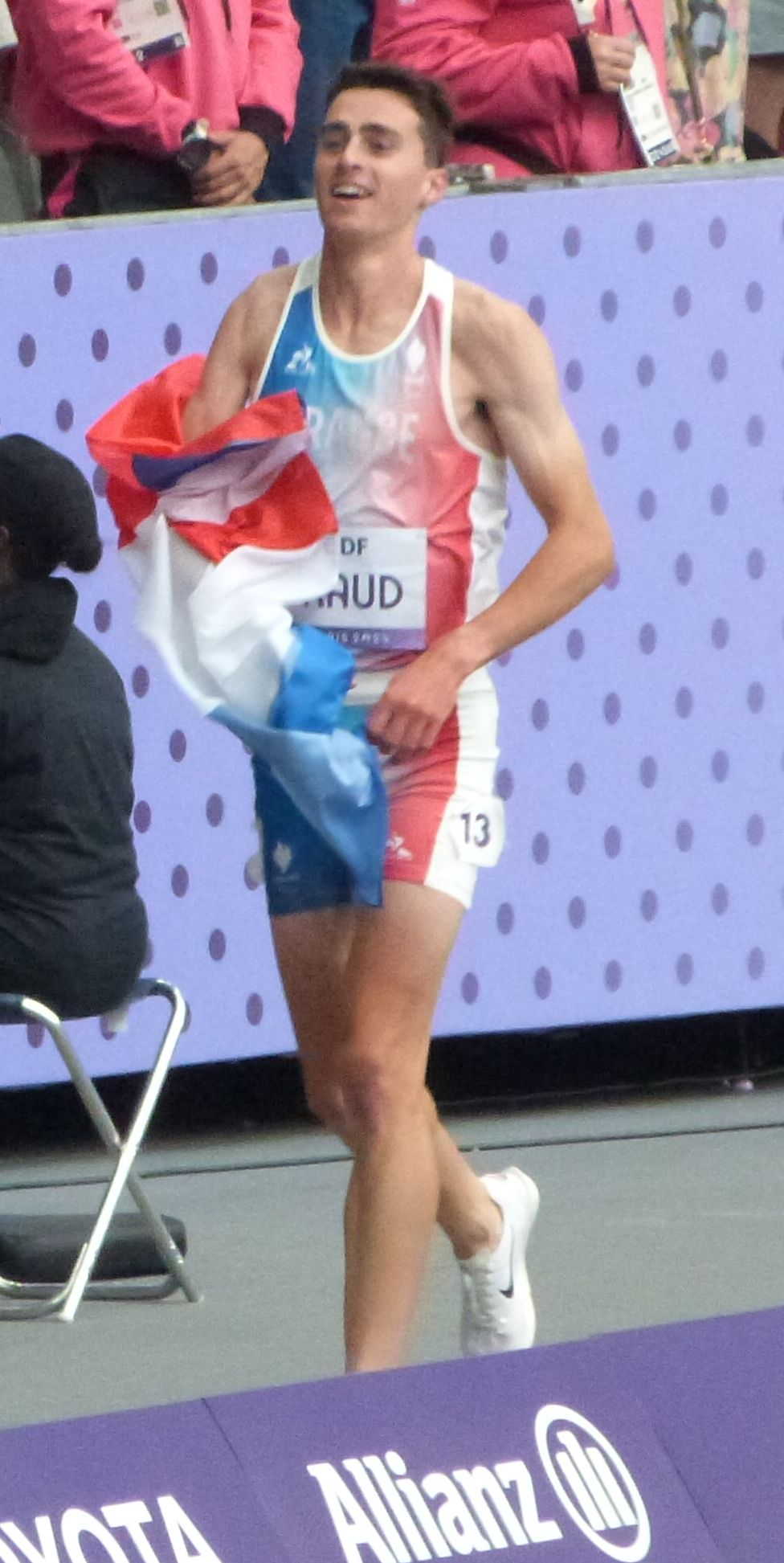

Personal information
- Nationality: French
- Born: 3 December 2003 (age 22) Vannes, France

Sport
- Sport: Para-athletics
- Disability class: T46
- Event: Middle-distance running
Medal record
Para-athletics
Representing France
Paralympic Games
Bronze medal – third place	2024 Paris	1500 m T46
World Championships
Silver medal – second place	2025 New Delhi	1500 m T46

Antoine Praud (born 3 December 2003) is a French middle-distance runner. He represented France at the 2024 Summer Paralympics.

== Career ==
Praud represented France at the 2024 Summer Paralympics and won a bronze medal in the 1500 metres T46 event.
