= Yitayal Silesh Yigzaw =

Ethiopian Paralympic athlete

Personal information
- Nationality: Ethiopian
- Born: 28 February 2005 (age 21)

Sport
- Sport: Para-athletics
- Disability class: T11
- Event: Middle-distance running
Medal record
Para-athletics
Representing Ethiopia
Paralympic Games
| Silver medal – second place | 2024 Paris | 1500 m T11 |

Yitayal Silesh Yigzaw (born 28 February 2005) is an Ethiopian T11 Paralympic middle-distance runner. He represented Ethiopia at the 2024 Summer Paralympics.

== Career ==
Yigzaw represented Ethiopia at the 2024 Summer Paralympics and won a silver medal in the 1500 metres T11 event.
