= Faisal Alrajehi =

Kuwaiti paralympic athlete

Personal information
- Born: 23 July 1998 (age 27) Kuwait City, Kuwait

Sport
- Country: Kuwait
- Sport: Para-athletics
- Disability class: T54
Medal record
Men's para-athletics
Representing Kuwait
Paralympic Games
Bronze medal – third place	2024 Paris	5000 m T54
World Championships
Silver medal – second place	2023 Paris	800 m T54
Gold medal – first place	2024 Kobe	5000 m T54
Asian Para Games
Bronze medal – third place	2022 Zhangzhou	5000 m T54

Faisal Alrajehi (born 23 July 1998), also known as Faisal Al-Rajhi, is a Kuwaiti paralympic athlete. He competed at the 2024 Summer Paralympics, winning the bronze medal in the men's 5000 m T54 event.
