= Athletics at the 2024 Summer Paralympics – Women's 200 metres T47 =

Women's 200 metres T47 at the XVII Paralympic Games
- Venue: Stade de France
- Dates: 7 September 2024
- Competitors: 19 from 16 nations
- Winning time: 24.71 AR

Medalists
1st place, gold medalist(s)		Anna Grimaldi	New Zealand
2nd place, silver medalist(s)		Brittni Mason	United States
3rd place, bronze medalist(s)		Sasirawan Inthachot	Thailand

200 metres at the 2024 Summer Paralympics
Men · T35 · T37 · T51 · T64
Women · T11 · T12 · T35 · T36 · T37 · T47 · T64

The women's 200 metres T47 event at the 2024 Summer Paralympics in Paris, took place on 7 September 2024.

The event is open to T45, T46 and T47 athletes. The T46 category is for athletes who have a single above or below elbow amputation or similar disability, with normal function in both legs. The T47 category is for athletes who have a single below elbow or wrist amputation or similar disability, with normal function in both legs.

== Records ==
T46/47 Records

World Record	Yunidis Castillo (CUB)	24.45	London, United Kingdom	1 September 2021
Paralympic Record	Yunidis Castillo (CUB)	24.45	London, United Kingdom	4 September 2012

Area	Time	Athlete	Location	Date
Africa				
America				
Asia				
Europe				
Oceania				

== Results ==
=== Round 1 ===
The Heats were held on 7 September, starting at 12:46 (UTC+2) in the morning session. First 2 in each heat (Q) and the next 2 fastest (q) advance to the final

==== Heat 1 ====
Rank	Lane	Class	Athlete	Nation	Time	Notes
1	5	T47	Fernanda Yara da Silva	Brazil	26.51	Q, PB
2	4	T46	Li Lu	China	26.51	Q, SB
3	2	T46	Angelina Lanza	France	27.05	
4	9	T47	Kim Marie Vaske	Germany	27.17	PB
5	7	T47	Tereza Jakschova	Czech Republic	27.27	
6	8	T46	Kadiatou Bangoura	Guinea	28.47	SB
—	3	T47	Lisbeli Marina Vera Andrade	Venezuela	DNS	
Source:					Wind: +0.6 m/s	

==== Heat 2 ====
Rank	Lane	Class	Athlete	Nation	Time	Notes
1	8	T46	Brittni Mason	United States	25.61	Q
2	3	T47	Anastasiia Soloveva	Neutral Paralympic Athletes	25.74	Q, SB
3	8	T47	Sheriauna Haase	Canada	25.87	q
4	7	T47	Petra Luteran	Hungary	25.90	PB
5	6	T47	Teresita Daiana Briozzi	Argentina	26.47	SB
6	5	T47	Amanda Cerna	Chile	27.61	SB
Source:					Wind: +0.2 m/s	

==== Heat 3 ====
Rank	Lane	Class	Athlete	Nation	Time	Notes
1	7	T47	Anna Grimaldi	New Zealand	25.09	Q AR
2	8	T47	Sasirawan Inthachot	Thailand	25.39	Q, SB
3	6	T47	Maria Clara Augusto da Silve	Brazil	25.53	q
4	5	T46	Jule Ross	Germany	25.93 (.925)	PB
4	3	T47	Marie Ngoussou Ngouyi	France	25.93 (.927)	
6	4	T47	Saska Sokolov	Serbia	25.98	
Source:					Wind: +0.5 m/s	

=== Final ===
The final was held on 7 September 2024.

Rank	Lane	Class	Athlete	Nation	Time	Notes
1st place, gold medalist(s)	7	T47	Anna Grimaldi	New Zealand	24.72	AR
2nd place, silver medalist(s)	8	T46	Brittni Mason	United States	25.18	
3rd place, bronze medalist(s)	4	T47	Sasirawan Inthachot	Thailand	25.20	SB
4	6	T47	Fernanda Yara da Silva	Brazil	25.35	PB
5	3	T47	Maria Clara Augusto da Silva	Brazil	25.71	
6	2	T47	Sheriauna Haase	Canada	25.76	
7	5	T47	Anastasiia Soloveva	Neutral Paralympic Athletes	26.05	
8	9	T46	Li Lu	China	25.66	
Source:					Wind: -0.3 m/s	
