= Athletics at the 2024 Summer Paralympics – Men's 200 metres T64 =

Men's 200 metres T64 at the XVII Paralympic Games
- Venue: Stade de France, Paris, France
- Dates: 7 September 2024
- Competitors: 16 from 13 nations
- Winning time: 21.32 PR

Medalists
1st place, gold medalist(s)		Sherman Guity	Costa Rica
2nd place, silver medalist(s)		Levi Vloet	Netherlands
3rd place, bronze medalist(s)		Mpumelelo Mhlongo	South Africa

200 metres at the 2024 Summer Paralympics
Men · T35 · T37 · T51 · T64
Women · T11 · T12 · T35 · T36 · T37 · T47 · T64

The Men's 200 metres T64 at the 2024 Summer Paralympics took place on 7 September at the Stade de France in Paris.

== Records ==
T44
World Record	Mpumelelo Mhlongo (RSA)	22.81	(Japan) Tokyo	4 September 2021
Paralympic Record	Mpumelelo Mhlongo (RSA)	22.86	(Japan) Tokyo	4 September 2021

Area	Time	Athlete	Location	Date
Africa				
America				
Asia				
Europe				
Oceania				

T64
World Record	Richard Browne (USA)	21.27	(Qatar) Doha	25 October 2015
Paralympic Record	Sherman Guity (CRC)	21.43	(Japan) Tokyo	4 September 2021

Area	Time	Athlete	Location	Date
Africa				
America				
Asia				
Europe				
Oceania				

== Classification ==
The event features both T44 and T64 classified athletes. T44 athletes have mild limb loss, muscle weakness or restrictions in the legs who don't use any prosthetics. T64 athletes have an absence of one leg below the knee and use a prosthetic running leg.

== Results ==
=== Round 1 ===
The Heats were held on 7 September, starting at 12:10 (UTC+2) in the morning session. First 3 in each heat (Q) and the next 2 fastest (q) advance to the final

=== Heat 1 ===
Rank	Lane	Class	Athlete	Nation	Time	Notes
1	7	T44	Mpumelelo Mhlongo	South Africa	22.92	Q
2	2	T64	Levi Vloet	Netherlands	23.03	Q
3	4	T64	Mitchell Joynt	New Zealand	23.20	Q
4	4	T64	Shunsuke Itani	Japan	23.67	q
5	8	T44	Karim Ramadan	Egypt	24.48	
6	5	T64	Antonio Flores	Malta	26.67	SB
—	9	T64	Maxcel Amo Manu	Italy	DQ	R18.2(c)
—	6	T44	Matheus de Lima	Brazil	DNS	
Source:					Wind: 0.0 m/s	

=== Heat 2 ===
Rank	Lane	Class	Athlete	Nation	Time	Notes
1	4	T64	Sherman Guity	Costa Rica	22.29	Q SB
2	6	T44	Felix Streng	Germany	22.31	Q
3	3	T44	Wallison Andre Fortes	Brazil	22.81	Q
4	8	T64	Michail Seitis	Greece	23.32	q
5	9	T64	Jonathan Gore	United States	23.89	
6	2	T64	Fabio Bottazzini	Italy	23.97	
7	5	T64	Pea Soe	Myanmar	24.42	SB
—	7	T64	Kengo Oshima	Japan	DNS	
Source:					Wind: -0.2 m/s	

=== Final ===
The final was held on 7 September.

Rank	Lane	Class	Athlete	Nation	Time	Notes
1st place, gold medalist(s)	6	T64	Sherman Guity	Costa Rica	21.32	PR
2nd place, silver medalist(s)	9	T64	Levi Vloet	Netherlands	22.47	PB
3rd place, bronze medalist(s)	7	T44	Mpumelelo Mhlongo	South Africa	22.62	WR
4	5	T44	Wallison Andre Fortes	Brazil	22.84	
5	3	T64	Michail Seitis	Greece	23.16	
6	4	T64	Mitchell Joynt	New Zealand	23.16	
7	2	T64	Shunsuke Itani	Japan	23.50	SB
—	8	T44	Felix Streng	Germany	DQ	R18.2(c)
Source:					Wind: +0.5 m/s	
