= 2021 World Para Athletics European Championships – Men's 5000 metres =

Three men's 5000 metres events were held at the 2021 World Para Athletics European Championships in Bydgoszcz, Poland.

== Medalists ==
Event	Gold		Silver		Bronze	
T11	Aleksander Kossakowski (POL); Guide: Krzysztof Wasilewski	16:55.10	Hasan Hüseyin Kaçar (TUR); Guides: Umut Kurkcu, Hasan Deniz Kalayci	17:01.18	Not awarded	
T13	Aleksandr Kostin (RUS)	15:00.53	Yassine Ouhdadi El Ataby (ESP)	15:01.94 CR	Łukasz Wietecki (POL)	15:02.41
T54	Marcel Hug (SUI)	10:57.80	Alexey Bychenok (RUS)	10:58.03	Julien Casoli (FRA)	10:58.21
WR world record | ER European record | CR championship record | NR national record | WL world leading | EL European leading | PB personal best | SB seasonal best

== See also ==
- List of IPC world records in athletics
