= 2024 World Para Athletics Championships – Men's 5000 metres =

The men's 5000 metres at the 2024 World Para Athletics Championships were held in Kobe.

== Medalists ==
Event	Gold	Silver	Bronze
T11	Yeltsin Jacques; Brazil	Júlio Cesar Agripino; Brazil	Kenya Karasawa; Japan
T13	Yassine Ouhdadi; Spain	Anton Kuliatin; Neutral Paralympic Athletes (NPA)	Aleksandr Kostin; Neutral Paralympic Athletes (NPA)
T54	Faisal Alrajehi; Kuwait	Saichon Konjen; Thailand	Luo Xingchuan; China
