= Chloe Dunbar =

Canadian athlete (born 2009)

Personal information
- Born: May 5, 2009 (age 17) Newport, Nova Scotia

Sport
- Country: Canada
- Sport: Para athletics
- Disability class: T47
- Coached by: Coach Charles Allen
Medal record
Women's para athletics
Representing Canada
Commonwealth Games
Silver medal – second place	2026 Glascow	100m T47

Chloe Dunbar (born May 5, 2009) is a Canadian para-athlete.

== Early life and education ==
Dunbar is from Newport, Nova Scotia. She was born without her right arm below the elbow. As a child, she participated in the War Amps Child Amputee (CHAMP) Program. Before competing in para athletics, Dunbar was a competitive cheerleader.

== Athletics career ==
Dunbar received her para-athletics classification after competing with her high school track and field team. She made her international debut at the 2025 World Para Athletics Grand Prix in Paris. She won gold in the women's T47 100 metres and silver in the women's T47 200 metres. That same year, she competed at the World Para Athletics Championships in New Delhi, India, where she placed sixth in her women's 200 metre T47 heat.

At the 2026 Canadian Track and Field Championships, Dunbar won both the 100-metre and 200-metre women's ambulatory races, setting a new personal best in each at 12.27 seconds and 25.22 seconds respectively. She won silver at the 2026 Commonwealth Games in the women's T47 100 metres, setting a personal record of 12.33 seconds.
