= Athletics at the 2024 Summer Paralympics – Men's 1500 metres T11 =

Men's 1500 metres T11 at the XVII Paralympic Games
- Venue: Stade de France
- Dates: 2 September 2024 (round 1); 3 September 2024 (final)
- Competitors: 8 from 6 nations
- Winning time: 3:55.82 WR

Medalists
1st place, gold medalist(s)		Yeltsin Jacques; Guide: Guilherme Dos Anjos Santos	Brazil
2nd place, silver medalist(s)		Yitayal Silesh Yigzaw; Guide: Esubalew Nebere	Ethiopia
3rd place, bronze medalist(s)		Júlio Cesar Agripino; Guide: Micael Batista dos Santos	Brazil

1500 metres at the 2024 Summer Paralympics
Men's · T11 · T13 · T20 · T38 · T46 · T54 · Women's · T11 · T13 · T20 · T54

The men's 1500 metres T11 event at the 2024 Summer Paralympics in Paris, took place on 2 and 3 September 2024.

The T11 category is for athletes with a visual impairment. A T11 athlete may be entirely without sight, or be able to perceive light, but have no ability to see the shape of a hand at any distance. T11 athletes commonly run with guides.

== Records ==
Prior to the competition, the existing records were as follows:

World Record	Yeltsin Jacques (BRA)	3:57.60	(Japan) Tokyo	31 August 2021
Paralympic Record	Yeltsin Jacques (BRA)	3:57.60	(Japan) Tokyo	31 August 2021

Area	Time	Athlete	Location	Date
Africa				
America				
Asia				
Europe				
Oceania				

== Results ==
=== Round 1 ===
First 2 in each heat (Q) and the next 2 fastest (q) advance to the Final.

==== Heat 1 ====
Rank	Athlete	Nation	Time	Notes
1	Yeltsin Jacques; Guide: Guilherme Dos Anjos Santos	Brazil	4:03.22	Q, SB
2	Yitayal Silesh Yigzaw; Guide: Esubalew Nebere	Ethiopia	4:06.11	Q
3	Kenya Karasawa; Guide: Koji Kobayashi	Japan	4:06.86	q, SB
4	Darwin Castro; Guide: Diego Arévalo Vizhñay	Ecuador	4:18.57	

==== Heat 2 ====
Rank	Athlete	Nation	Time	Notes
1	Júlio Cesar Agripino; Guide: Micael Batista dos Santos	Brazil	4:10.10	Q
2	Jimmy Caicedo; Guide: Daniel Taramuel	Ecuador	4:10.30	Q
3	Aleksander Kossakowski; Guide: Krzysztof Wasilewski	Poland	4:18.19	q
—	Fedor Rudakov; Guide: Andrei Safronov	Neutral Paralympic Athletes	DNF	

=== Final ===
Rank	Athlete	Nation	Time	Notes
1st place, gold medalist(s)	Yeltsin Jacques; Guide: Guilherme Dos Anjos Santos	Brazil	3:55.82	WR
2nd place, silver medalist(s)	Yitayal Silesh Yigzaw; Guide: Esubalew Nebere	Ethiopia	4:03.21	
3rd place, bronze medalist(s)	Júlio Cesar Agripino; Guide: Micael Batista dos Santos	Brazil	4:04.03	
4	Kenya Karasawa; Guide: Koji Kobayashi	Japan	4:04.40	AR
5	Jimmy Caicedo; Guide: Daniel Taramuel	Ecuador	4:10.79	
6	Aleksander Kossakowski; Guide: Krzysztof Wasilewski	Poland	4:18.86	
