= Athletics at the 2024 Summer Paralympics – Men's 5000 metres T54 =

Men's 5000 metres T54 at the XVII Paralympic Games
- Venue: Stade de France
- Dates: 31 August 2024
- Competitors: 10 from 7 nations

Medalists
1st place, gold medalist(s)		Daniel Romanchuk	United States
2nd place, silver medalist(s)		Marcel Hug	Switzerland
3rd place, bronze medalist(s)		Faisal Alrajehi	Kuwait

5000 metres at the 2024 Summer Paralympics
Men's · T11 · T13 · T54 · Women's · T54

The men's 5000 metres T54 event at the 2024 Summer Paralympics in Paris, took place on 30 August 2024.

The T54 category is for wheelchair athletes with no leg function, but near full arm function and reasonable to normal trunk function. Typically this may be caused by a lower spinal cord injury or spinal cord birth defect.

== Records ==
Prior to the competition, the existing records were as follows:

World record	Marcel Hug (SUI)	9:13.84	(United Arab Emirates) Dubai	15 Feb 2024
Paralympic record	Marcel Hug (SUI)	9:53.26	(Japan) Tokyo	27 August 2021

== Final ==
This event went straight to final.

The final in this classification took place on 31 August 2024, at 20:39:

Rank	Name	Nationality	Time	Notes
1st place, gold medalist(s)	Daniel Romanchuk	United States	10:55.28	
2nd place, silver medalist(s)	Marcel Hug	Switzerland	10:55.78	
3rd place, bronze medalist(s)	Faisal Alrajehi	Kuwait	10:55.99	
4	Ma Zhuo	China	10:56.20	SB
5	Saichon Konjen	Thailand	10:56.26	
6	Luo Xingchuan	China	10:56.48	SB
7	Brent Lakatos	Canada	10:56.73	
8	David Weir	Great Britain	10:56.88	
9	Brian Siemann	United States	12:47.92	
—	Putharet Khongrak	Thailand	DNF	
