= Luo Xingchuan =

Chinese para-athlete (born 2002)

Personal information
- Native name: 罗兴传
- Nationality: Chinese
- Born: 17 December 2002 (age 23)

Sport
- Country: China
- Sport: Wheelchair racing
- Disability class: T54
- Events: 1500 metres, 5000 metres
Medal record
Men's para-athletics
Representing China
World Championships
Silver medal – second place	2025 New Delhi	1500 m T54
Bronze medal – third place	2024 Kobe	5000 m T54

Luo Xingchuan (Chinese: 罗兴传; born 17 December 2002) is a Chinese wheelchair racer. He represented China at the 2024 Summer Paralympics.

== Career ==
In May 2024, Luo competed at the 2024 World Para Athletics Championships and won a bronze medal in the 5000 metres T54 event. In September 2024, he represented China at the 2024 World Para Athletics Championships and finished in sixth place in both the 1500 metres T54 and 5000 metres T54 events. He then competed at the 2025 World Para Athletics Championships and won a silver medal in the 1500 metres T54 event.
