= Athletics at the 2024 Summer Paralympics – Men's 200 metres T37 =

Men's 200 metres T37 at the XVII Paralympic Games
- Venue: Stade de France
- Dates: 6 September 2024 (round 1); 7 September 2024 (final)
- Winning time: 22.69

Medalists
1st place, gold medalist(s)		Andrei Vdovin	Neutral Paralympic Athletes
2nd place, silver medalist(s)		Ricardo Gomes de Mendonça	Brazil
3rd place, bronze medalist(s)		Christian Gabriel Costa	Brazil

200 metres at the 2024 Summer Paralympics
Men · T35 · T37 · T51 · T64
Women · T11 · T12 · T35 · T36 · T37 · T47 · T64

The men's 200 metres T37 event at the 2024 Summer Paralympics in Paris, took place on 6 and 7 September 2024.

The T37 category is for ambulant athletes with cerebral palsy. These athletes have movement and coordination problems on one half of their body. They have good ability in their dominant side of their body (ie hemiplegia).

== Records ==
Prior to the competition, the existing records were as follows:

World Record	Nick Mayhugh (USA)	21.91	(Japan) Tokyo	4 September 2021
Paralympic Record	Nick Mayhugh (USA)	21.91	(Japan) Tokyo	4 September 2021

Area	Time	Athlete	Location	Date
Africa				
America				
Asia				
Europe				
Oceania				

== Results ==
=== Round 1 ===
First 3 in each heat (Q) and the next 2 fastest (q) advance to the Final.

==== Heat 1 ====
Rank	Lane	Athlete	Nation	Time	Notes
1	7	Saptoyogo Purnomo	Indonesia	23.41	Q, SB
2	9	Ali Aklnakhli	Saudi Arabia	23.43	Q, SB
3	4	Michal Kotkowski	Poland	23.51 (.502)	Q
4	5	Ricardo Gomes de Mendonça	Brazil	23.51 (.509)	q
5	6	Anton Feoktistov	Neutral Paralympic Athletes	23.91	
6	3	Yaroslav Okapinskyi	Ukraine	24.20	
7	8	Petrus Karuli	Namibia	25.24	SB
Source:				Wind: +0.1 m/s	

==== Heat 2 ====
Rank	Lane	Athlete	Nation	Time	Notes
1	8	Christian Gabriel Costa	Brazil	23.05	Q, SB
2	3	Bartolomeu Chaves	Brazil	23.53	Q, PB
3	5	Andrei Vdovin	Neutral Paralympic Athletes	23.54	Q
4	7	Mykola Raiskyi	Ukraine	23.69	q, PB
5	6	Sofiane Hamdi	Algeria	23.80	SB
—	4	Andrés Malambo	Colombia	DNS	
Source:				Wind: +0.5 m/s	

=== Final ===
Rank	Lane	Athlete	Nation	Time	Notes
1st place, gold medalist(s)	9	Andrei Vdovin	Neutral Paralympic Athletes	22.69	SB
2nd place, silver medalist(s)	3	Ricardo Gomes de Mendonça	Brazil	22.71	SB
3rd place, bronze medalist(s)	7	Christian Gabriel Costa	Brazil	22.74	PB
4	5	Bartolomeu Chaves	Brazil	23.22	PB
5	6	Saptoyogo Purnomo	Indonesia	23.26	PB
6	4	Michal Kotkowski	Poland	23.41	
7	8	Ali Aklnakhli	Saudi Arabia	23.44	
8	2	Mykola Raiskyi	Ukraine	23.91	
Source:				Wind: +0.3 m/s	
