= Athletics at the 2024 Summer Paralympics – Women's 200 metres T36 =

Women's 200 metres T36 at the XVII Paralympic Games
- Venue: Stade de France
- Dates: 31 August 2024 (round 1); 1 September 2024 (final)
- Competitors: 10 from 9 nations
- Winning time: 27.50

Medalists
1st place, gold medalist(s)		Shi Yiting	China
2nd place, silver medalist(s)		Danielle Aitchison	Australia
3rd place, bronze medalist(s)		Mali Lovell	New Zealand

200 metres at the 2024 Summer Paralympics
Men · T35 · T37 · T51 · T64
Women · T11 · T12 · T35 · T36 · T37 · T47 · T64

The women's 200 metres T36 event at the 2024 Summer Paralympics in Paris, took place on 31 August and 1 September 2024.

The T36 category is for ambulant athletes with cerebral palsy. These athletes do not have the capacity to remain still and they show involuntary movements with all four limbs affected. They usually walk without assistive devices.

== Records ==
Prior to the competition, the existing event records were as follows:

World record	Danielle Aitchison (NZL)	27.47	(Japan) Kobe	23 May 2024
Paralympic record	Shi Yiting (CHN)	28.21	(Japan) Tokyo	29 August 2021

Area	Time	Athlete	Location	Date
Africa				
America				
Asia				
Europe				
Oceania				

== Results ==
=== Round One ===
Round one consisted of two heats with eleven total entrants with the first 3 in each heat (Q) and the next 2 fastest (q) advancing to the Final.

==== Heat 1 ====
Rank	Lane	Athlete	Nation	Time	Notes
1	4	Shi Yiting	China	28.87	Q
2	7	Mali Lovell	Australia	30.08	Q
3	6	Veronica Hipolito	Brazil	30.80	Q, SB
4	8	Nicole Nicoleitzik	Germany	30.88	q
5	5	Cheyenne Bouthoorn	Netherlands	31.43	
Source:				Wind: +0.5 m/s	

==== Heat 2 ====
Rank	Lane	Athlete	Nation	Time	Notes
1	4	Danielle Aitchison	New Zealand	28.09	Q, PR
2	7	Araceli Rotela	Argentina	30.08	Q, AR
3	5	Samira da Silva	Brazil	30.96	Q
4	8	Jeon Min-jae	South Korea	31.13	q
5	6	Kwok Fan Yam	Hong Kong	33.16	
Source:				Wind: +0.6 m/s	

=== Final ===
The final in this classification took place on 1 September 2024, at 12:23.

Rank	Lane	Athlete	Nation	Time	Notes
1st place, gold medalist(s)	6	Shi Yiting	China	27.50	PR, AR
2nd place, silver medalist(s)	7	Danielle Aitchison	New Zealand	27.64	
3rd place, bronze medalist(s)	8	Mali Lovell	Australia	29.82	
4	4	Araceli Rotela	Argentina	29.89	AR
5	3	Jeon Min-jae	South Korea	30.76	SB
6	9	Samira da Silva Brito	Brazil	31.01	
7	5	Veronica Hipolito	Brazil	31.03	
8	2	Nicole Nicoleitzik	Germany	31.72	
Source:				Wind: -0.3 m/s	
