= Athletics at the 2024 Summer Paralympics – Men's 200 metres T35 =

Men's 200 metres T35 at the XVII Paralympic Games
- Venue: Stade de France
- Dates: 7 September 2024
- Competitors: 9 from 4 nations
- Winning time: 23.19

Medalists
1st place, gold medalist(s)		Ihor Tsvietov	Ukraine
2nd place, silver medalist(s)		Dmitrii Safronov	Neutral Paralympic Athletes
3rd place, bronze medalist(s)		Artem Kalashian	Neutral Paralympic Athletes

200 metres at the 2024 Summer Paralympics
Men · T35 · T37 · T51 · T64
Women · T11 · T12 · T35 · T36 · T37 · T47 · T64

The men's 200 metres T35 event at the 2024 Summer Paralympics in Paris, took place on 7 September 2024.

The T35 category is for ambulant athletes with cerebral palsy. The typical T35 athlete may need assistive devices for walking. The athlete may have sufficient function to run but demonstrates poor balance.

== Records ==
Prior to the competition, the existing records were as follows:

World Record	Dmitrii Safronov (RPC)	23.00	(Japan) Tokyo	4 September 2021
Paralympic Record	Dmitrii Safronov (RPC)	23.00	(Japan) Tokyo	4 September 2021

Area	Time		Athlete	Location	Date
Africa	26.70		(Algeria) Allel Boukhalfa	(United Kingdom) London	6 September 2012
America	24.14		(Brazil) Henrique Nascimento	(Brazil) São Paulo	9 June 2020
Asia	25.51		(Iran) Alireza Zare	(China) Hangzhou	25 October 2023
Europe	23.00	WR	Dmitrii Safronov	(Japan) Tokyo	4 September 2021
Oceania	27.14		(Australia) Jackson Love	(Australia) Canberra	26 January 2024

== Results ==
=== Final ===
Rank	Lane	Athlete	Nation	Time	Notes
1st place, gold medalist(s)	7	Ihor Tsvietov	Ukraine	23.19	SB
2nd place, silver medalist(s)	6	Dmitrii Safronov	Neutral Paralympic Athletes	23.78	
3rd place, bronze medalist(s)	4	Artem Kalashian	Neutral Paralympic Athletes	23.88	
4	9	Henrique Nascimento	Brazil	24.14	AR
5	2	Ivan Tetiukhin	Ukraine	24.87	PB
6	5	Maximiliano Villa	Argentina	25.10	
7	3	Hernan Barreto	Argentina	25.53	SB
8	8	David Dzhatiev	Neutral Paralympic Athletes	26.02	
9	1	Fabio Bordignon	Brazil	29.71	SB
Source:				Wind: 0.0 m/s	
