= Athletics at the 2024 Summer Paralympics – Men's 1500 metres T13 =

Men's 1500 metres T13 at the XVII Paralympic Games
- Venue: Stade de France
- Dates: 3 September 2024
- Competitors: 8 from 7 nations
- Winning time: 3:44.43 PR, AR

Medalists
1st place, gold medalist(s)		Aleksandr Kostin	Neutral Paralympic Athletes
2nd place, silver medalist(s)		Rouay Jebabli	Tunisia
3rd place, bronze medalist(s)		Anton Kuliatin	Neutral Paralympic Athletes

1500 metres at the 2024 Summer Paralympics
Men's · T11 · T13 · T20 · T38 · T46 · T54 · Women's · T11 · T13 · T20 · T54

The men's 1500 metres T13 event at the 2024 Summer Paralympics in Paris, took place on 3 September 2024.

The T13 category is for athletes with a moderate visual impairment. Athletes in this category have a variety of visual impairments, but can typically recognize contours from a distance of 2 to 6 metres. Athletes in this category do not typically require a guide.

== Records ==
Prior to the competition, the existing records were as follows:

T12
World Record	Jaryd Clifford (AUS)	3:41.34	(Australia) Canberra	11 March 2021
Paralympic Record	Abderrahim Zhiou (TUN)	3:48.31	(United Kingdom) London	4 September 2012

Area	Time	Athlete	Location	Date
Africa				
America				
Asia				
Europe				
Oceania				

T13
World Record	Abdellatif Baka (ALG)	3:48.29	(Brazil) Rio de Janeiro	11 September 2016
Paralympic Record	Abdellatif Baka (ALG)	3:48.29	(Brazil) Rio de Janeiro	11 September 2016

Area	Time	Athlete	Location	Date
Africa				
America				
Asia				
Europe				
Oceania				

== Results ==
=== Final ===
Rank	Class	Athlete	Nation	Time	Notes
1st place, gold medalist(s)	T12	Aleksandr Kostin	Neutral Paralympic Athletes	3:44.43	PR, AR
2nd place, silver medalist(s)	T12	Rouay Jebabli	Tunisia	3:44.67	AR
3rd place, bronze medalist(s)	T12	Anton Kuliatin	Neutral Paralympic Athletes	3:44.94	PB
4	T12	Jaryd Clifford	Australia	3:44.95	SB
5	T13	Yassine Ouhdadi	Spain	3:46.20	WR
6	T13	Abdellatif Baka	Algeria	3:47.16	AR
7	T13	Joel Gomez	United States	3:48.42	AR
8	T13	Mikail Al	Turkey	3:55.34	PB
