= Athletics at the 2024 Summer Paralympics – Men's 5000 metres T13 =

Men's 5000 metres T13 at the XVII Paralympic Games
- Venue: Stade de France
- Dates: 31 August 2024
- Competitors: 8 from 6 nations
- Winning time: 15:50.64

Medalists
| 1st place, gold medalist(s) | | Aleksandr Kostin | Neutral Paralympic Athletes |
| 2nd place, silver medalist(s) | | Anton Kuliatin | Neutral Paralympic Athletes |
| 3rd place, bronze medalist(s) | | Sixto Moreta | Ecuador |

5000 metres at the 2024 Summer Paralympics
Men's · T11 · T13 · T54 · Women's · T54

The men's 5000 metres T13 event at the 2024 Summer Paralympics in Paris, took place on 30 August 2024.

The T13 category is for athletes with a moderate visual impairment. Athletes in this category have a variety of visual impairments, but can typically recognize contours from a distance of 2 to 6 metres. Athletes in this category do not typically require a guide.

== Records ==
Prior to the competition, the existing records were as follows:

| World record | Youssef Benibrahim (MAR) | 14:20.69 | (United Kingdom) London | 16 July 2017 |
| Paralympic record | Bilel Aloui (TUN) | 14:33.33 | (Brazil) Rio de Janeiro | 15 September 2017 |

== Final ==
This event went straight to final.

The final in this classification took place on 31 August 2024, at 10:14:

On 2 June 2025, the initial winner of the race, Yassine Ouhdadi El Ataby, has been banned by the International Paralympic Committee for a period of three years for committing an anti-doping rule violation. All results obtained by the athlete from the date the sample was collected on 28 July 2024 are also disqualified. As a consequence, neutral Paralympic athletes Aleksandr Kostin and Anton Kuliatin have been awarded the gold and silver medals, respectively. Bronze went to Ecuador’s Sixto Roman Moreta Criollo.

| Rank | Name | Nationality | Time | Notes |
|---|---|---|---|---|
| 1st place, gold medalist(s) | Aleksandr Kostin | Neutral Paralympic Athletes | 15:52.36 | |
| 2nd place, silver medalist(s) | Anton Kuliatin | Neutral Paralympic Athletes | 15:55.23 | |
| 3rd place, bronze medalist(s) | Sixto Roman Moreta Criollo | Ecuador | 16:06.79 | |
| 4 | Guillaume Ouellet | Canada | 16:07.71 | |
| 5 | John Lokedi | Kenya | 16:10.06 | |
| 6 | Mikail Al | Turkey | 16:12.45 | |
| — | Yassine Ouhdadi El Ataby | Spain | 15:50.64 | DQ |
| — | Jaryd Clifford | Australia | DQ | R7.9.5 |
