= Júlio Cesar Agripino =

Brazilian Paralympic athlete (born 1991)

Personal information
- Born: 17 January 1991 (age 35) Diadema, São Paulo, Brazil

Sport
- Sport: Paralympic athletics
- Disability: Keratoconus
- Disability class: T11
- Events: 1500 metres 5000 metres
Medal record
Representing Brazil
Paralympic Games
Gold medal – first place	2024 Paris	5000m T11
Bronze medal – third place	2024 Paris	1500 m T11
World Championships
Gold medal – first place	2019 Dubai	1500m T11
Gold medal – first place	2024 Kobe	1500m T11
Silver medal – second place	2023 Paris	5000m T11
Silver medal – second place	2024 Kobe	5000m T11
Silver medal – second place	2025 New Delhi	1500m T11
Parapan American Games
Gold medal – first place	2023 Santiago	1500m T11
Bronze medal – third place	2023 Santiago	5000m T11

Júlio Cesar Agripino dos Santos (born 17 January 1991) is a Brazilian Paralympic athlete who competes in international track and field competitions. He is a double World champion in middle-distance running and World silver medalists in long-distance running. He has also competed at the 2016 and 2020 Summer Paralympics but did not medal.
