= Athletics at the 2024 Summer Paralympics – Men's 1500 metres T46 =

Men's 1500 metres T46 at the XVII Paralympic Games
- Venue: Stade de France, Paris, France
- Dates: 31 August 2024
- Competitors: 16 from 16 nations
- Winning time: 3:50.24

Medalists
1st place, gold medalist(s)		Aleksandr Iaremchuk	Neutral Paralympic Athletes
2nd place, silver medalist(s)		Michael Roeger	Australia
3rd place, bronze medalist(s)		Antoine Praud	France

1500 metres at the 2024 Summer Paralympics
Men's · T11 · T13 · T20 · T38 · T46 · T54 · Women's · T11 · T13 · T20 · T54

The Men's 1500 metres T46 at the 2024 Summer Paralympics took place 4 September at the Stade de France in Paris.

== Records ==
T45
World Record	Pedro Meza Zempoaltecal (MEX)	4:08:26	(Greece) Athens	20 September 2004
Paralympic Record	Pedro Meza Zempoaltecal (MEX)	4:08:26	(Greece) Athens	20 September 2004

Area	Time	Athlete	Location	Date
Africa				
America				
Asia				
Europe				
Oceania				

T46
World Record	Michael Roeger (AUS)	3:46.51	(Australia) Sydney	4 September 2017
Paralympic Record	Abraham Tarbei (KEN)	3:50.15	(United Kingdom) London	4 September 2012

Area	Time	Athlete	Location	Date
Africa				
America				
Asia				
Europe				
Oceania				

== Classification ==
The event is open to T45 and T46 athletes. Athletes with a moderate or high degree of impairment in one or both arms or the loss of limbs. These athletes generate drive almost exclusively using the legs with reduced counterbalance from the arms.

== Results ==
=== Final ===
The final was held on 31 August 2024

Rank	Class	Athlete	Nation	Time	Notes
1st place, gold medalist(s)	T46	Aleksandr Iaremchuk	Neutral Paralympic Athletes	3:50.24	
2nd place, silver medalist(s)	T46	Michael Roeger	Australia	3:51.19	
3rd place, bronze medalist(s)	T46	Antoine Praud	France	3:51.37	PB
4	T46	Hristiyan Stoyanov	Bulgaria	3:52.27	
5	T46	Samir Nouioua	Algeria	3:57.30	
6	T46	Luke Nuttall	Great Britain	3:57.62	SB
7	T46	Gemechu Amenu Dinsa	Ethiopia	3:59.05	
8	T46	David Emong	Uganda	4:01.48	
9	T46	Pradeep Puwakpitikande	Sri Lanka	4:01.84	
10	T46	Christian Olsen	Denmark	4:02.76	
11	T46	Mauricio Esteban Orrego Campos	Chile	4:06.03	
12	T46	Wesley Kimeli Sang	Kenya	4:07.92	
13	T46	Bechir Agoubi	Tunisia	4:09.72	
14	T46	Remy Nikobimeze	Burundi	4:10.69	SB
15	T46	Grevist Bytyci	Kosovo	4:32.88	PB
—	T46	Emmanuel Niyibizi	Rwanda	DQ	R18.2(d)
