= Neutral Paralympic Athletes at the 2024 Summer Paralympics =

Name used for Russian & Belarusian athletes

- Flag used by the Neutral Paralympic Athletes
- IPC code: NPA

in Paris, France
- Competitors: 96 in 5 sports
- Flag bearer: N/A (did not participate in Parade of Nations)
- Medals Ranked N/Ath: Gold 26 Silver 22 Bronze 23 Total 71

Summer Paralympics appearances (overview)
- 1992; 1996; 2000; 2004–2012; 2016; 2020; 2024

Other related appearances
- Soviet Union (1988); Unified Team (1992); Russia (1994–2014)

Neutral Paralympic Athletes was the name used to represent approved Russian and Belarusian athletes at the 2024 Summer Paralympics, after the International Paralympic Committee (IPC) banned the nations' previous designations due to the Russian invasion of Ukraine in 2022.

Neutral athletes competed under a white flag featuring black lettering spelling out NPA. The flag's use was limited to TV and sports presentation graphics and during medal ceremonies. Medal wins were not recorded on the 2024 Summer Paralympic Games official medal table; further, if a neutral athlete wins a gold medal, the Paralympic anthem was played.

== Medalists ==
Medal	Name	Country	Sport	Event	Date
Gold	Ihar Boki	Belarus	Swimming	Men's 100 m butterfly S13	29 August
Gold	Ihar Boki	Belarus	Swimming	Men's 100 m backstroke S13	30 August
Gold	Andrei Kalina	Russia	Swimming	Men's 100 m breaststroke SB8	30 August
Gold	Aleksandr Iaremchuk	Russia	Athletics	Men's 1500 m T46	31 August
Gold	Valeriia Shabalina	Russia	Swimming	Women's 200 m freestyle S14	31 August
Gold	Ihar Boki	Belarus	Swimming	Men's 400 m freestyle S13	31 August
Gold	Aleksei Churkin	Russia	Athletics	Men's club throw F32	31 August
Gold	Roman Zhdanov	Russia	Swimming	Men's 150 m individual medley SM4	1 September
Gold	Ihar Boki	Belarus	Swimming	Men's 50 m freestyle S13	2 September
Gold	Dmitrii Cherniaev	Russia	Swimming	Men's 100 m breaststroke SB4	2 September
Gold	Evgenii Torsunov	Russia	Athletics	Men's long jump T36	2 September
Gold	Aleksandr Kostin	Russia	Athletics	Men's 1500 m T13	3 September
Gold	Yahor Shchalkanau	Belarus	Swimming	Men's 100 m backstroke S9	3 September
Gold	Daria Lukianenko	Russia	Swimming	Women's 200 m individual medley SM11	3 September
Gold	Ihar Boki	Belarus	Swimming	Men's 200 m individual medley SM13	3 September
Gold	Andrey Vdovin	Russia	Athletics	Men's 400 m T37	4 September
Gold	Khetag Khinchagov	Russia	Athletics	Men's long jump T38	4 September
Gold	Valeriia Shabalina	Russia	Swimming	Women's 200 m individual medley SM14	4 September
Gold	Vladimir Sviridov	Russia	Athletics	Men's shot put F36	4 September
Gold	Mariia Pavlova	Russia	Swimming	Women's 100 m breaststroke SB7	5 September
Gold	Daria Lukianenko	Russia	Swimming	Women's 100 m breaststroke SB11	5 September
Gold	Ivan Revenko	Russia	Athletics	Men's javelin throw F54	6 September
Gold	Andrey Vdovin	Russia	Athletics	Men's 200 m T37	7 September
Gold	Roman Zhdanov	Russia	Swimming	Men's 50 m backstroke S4	7 September
Gold	Daria Lukianenko	Russia	Swimming	Women's 100 m freestyle S11	7 September
Gold	Matvei Iakushev	Russia	Athletics	Men's long jump T20	7 September
Silver	Vladimir Danilenko	Russia	Swimming	Men's 100 m backstroke S2	29 August
Silver	Kirill Pulver	Russia	Swimming	Men's 200 m freestyle S5	29 August
Silver	Vladimir Sotnikov	Russia	Swimming	Men's 100 m backstroke S13	30 August
Silver	Anna Kulinich-Sorokina	Russia	Athletics	Women's javelin throw F13	31 August
Silver	Aleksandr Kostin	Russia	Athletics	Men's 5000 m T13	31 August
Silver	Viktoriia Ishchiulova	Russia	Swimming	Women's 100 m backstroke S8	31 August
Silver	Vladimir Danilenko	Russia	Swimming	Men's 50 m backstroke S2	31 August
Silver	Aliaskhab Ramazanov	Russia	Taekwondo	Men's +80 kg	31 August
Silver	Viktoriia Ishchiulova	Russia	Swimming	Women's 200 m individual medley SM8	1 September
Silver	Nataliia Butkova	Russia	Swimming	Women's 150 m individual medley SM4	1 September
Silver	Denis Tarasov	Russia	Swimming	Men's 50 m freestyle S9	2 September
Silver	Zoia Shchurova	Russia	Swimming	Women's 50 m backstroke S3	2 September
Silver	Vladimir Danilenko	Russia	Swimming	Men's 200 m freestyle S2	2 September
Silver	Artem Kalashian	Russia	Athletics	Men's 100 m T35	2 September
Silver	Roman Zhdanov	Russia	Swimming	Men's 200 m freestyle S4	3 September
Silver	Aleksei Churkin	Russia	Athletics	Men's shot put F32	3 September
Silver	Alan Kokoity	Russia	Athletics	Men's shot put F36	4 September
Silver	Elena Prokofeva	Russia	Table tennis	Women's individual C11	5 September
Silver	Valeriia Shabalina	Russia	Swimming	Women's 100 m backstroke S14	6 September
Silver	Dmitrii Safronov	Russia	Athletics	Men's 200 m T35	7 September
Silver	Viktoriia Ishchiulova	Russia	Swimming	Women's 100 m butterfly S8	7 September
Silver	Dzmitry Salei	Belarus	Swimming	Men's 100 m butterfly S12	7 September
Bronze	Valeriia Shabalina	Russia	Swimming	Women's 100 m butterfly S14	29 August
Bronze	Kirill Pulver	Russia	Swimming	Men's 100 m freestyle S5	30 August
Bronze	Daria Lukianenko	Russia	Swimming	Women's 400 m freestyle S11	30 August
Bronze	Andrey Vdovin	Russia	Athletics	Men's 100 m T37	30 August
Bronze	Viktoriia Ishchiulova	Russia	Swimming	Women's 100 m breaststroke SB8	30 August
Bronze	Anton Kuliatin	Russia	Athletics	Men's 5000 m T13	31 August
Bronze	Irina Vertinskaya	Russia	Athletics	Women's shot put F37	31 August
Bronze	Daria Lukianenko	Russia	Swimming	Women's 100 m backstroke S11	1 September
Bronze	Georgii Margiev	Russia	Athletics	Men's high jump T47	1 September
Bronze	Dmitrii Safronov	Russia	Athletics	Men's 100 m T35	2 September
Bronze	Anton Kuliatin	Russia	Athletics	Men's 1500 m T13	3 September
Bronze	Nikita Kotukov	Russia	Athletics	Men's long jump T47	3 September
Bronze	Bogdan Mozgovoi	Russia	Swimming	Men's 100 m backstroke S9	3 September
Bronze	Vladimir Sotnikov	Russia	Swimming	Men's 200 m individual medley SM13	3 September
Bronze	Viktoriia Slanova	Russia	Athletics	Women's 400 m T37	3 September
Bronze	Andrei Nikolaev	Russia	Swimming	Men's 400 m freestyle S8	4 September
Bronze	Egor Efrosinin	Russia	Swimming	Men's 50 m freestyle S7	4 September
Bronze	Evgeniia Galaktionova	Russia	Athletics	Women's shot put F32	4 September
Bronze	Viktoriia Ishchiulova	Russia	Swimming	Women's 50 m freestyle S8	5 September
Bronze	Svetlana Krivenok	Russia	Athletics	Women's shot put F33	5 September
Bronze	Artem Kalashian	Russia	Athletics	Men's 200 m T35	7 September
Bronze	Maliak Alieva	Russia	Table tennis	Women's individual C6	7 September
Bronze	Egor Efrosinin	Russia	Swimming	Men's 50 m butterfly S7	7 September

Medals by sport
Sport	1st place, gold medalist(s)	2nd place, silver medalist(s)	3rd place, bronze medalist(s)	Total
Swimming	16	14	11	41
Athletics	10	6	11	27
Table tennis	0	1	1	2
Taekwondo	0	1	0	1
Total	26	22	23	71

Medals by date
Day	Date	1st place, gold medalist(s)	2nd place, silver medalist(s)	3rd place, bronze medalist(s)	Total
1	29 August	1	2	1	4
2	30 August	2	1	4	7
3	31 August	4	5	2	11
4	1 September	1	2	2	5
5	2 September	3	4	1	8
6	3 September	4	2	5	11
7	4 September	4	1	3	8
8	5 September	2	1	2	5
9	6 September	1	2	0	3
10	7 September	4	3	3	10
11	8 September	0	0	0	0
Total		26	22	23	71

Medals by gender
Gender	1st place, gold medalist(s)	2nd place, silver medalist(s)	3rd place, bronze medalist(s)	Total	Percentage
Male	20	14	13	47	66.2%
Female	6	8	10	24	33.8%
Total	26	22	23	71	100%

Multiple medalists
Name	Total	Sport	1st place, gold medalist(s)	2nd place, silver medalist(s)	3rd place, bronze medalist(s)
Ihar Boki	5	Swimming	5	0	0
Daria Lukianenko	5	Swimming	3	0	2
Viktoriia Ishchiulova	5	Swimming	0	3	2
Valeriia Shabalina	4	Swimming	2	1	1
Roman Zhdanov	3	Swimming	2	1	0
Andrey Vdovin	3	Athletics	2	0	1
Vladimir Danilenko	3	Swimming	0	3	0
Aleksandr Kostin	2	Athletics	1	1	0
Aleksei Churkin	2	Athletics	1	1	0
Artem Kalashian	2	Athletics	0	1	1
Dmitrii Safronov	2	Athletics	0	1	1
Kirill Pulver	2	Swimming	0	1	1
Vladimir Sotnikov	2	Swimming	0	1	1
Anton Kuliatin	2	Athletics	0	0	2
Egor Efrosinin	2	Swimming	0	0	2

== Competitors ==
The following is the list of number of competitors in the Games.

Sport	Men	Women	Total
Athletics	28	20	48
Paratriathlon	1	1	2
Swimming	23	17	40
Table tennis	1	3	4
Taekwondo	1	1	2
Total	54	42	96

== Athletics ==
Neutral Paralympic Athletes track and field athletes achieved quota places for the following events based on their results at the 2023 World Championships, 2024 World Championships, or through high performance allocation, as long as they meet the minimum entry standard (MES).

Key

- Note–Ranks given for track events are within the athlete's heat only
- Q = Qualified for the next round
- q = Qualified for the next round as a fastest loser or, in field events, by position without achieving the qualifying target
- DQ = Disqualified
- PR = Paralympic Record
- AR = Area (or continental) Record
- NR = National Record
- SB = Season's Best
- N/A = Round not applicable for the event
- Bye = Athlete not required to compete in round

=== Track & road events ===
Men

Athlete	From	Event	Heat		Final	
Athlete	From	Event	Result	Rank	Result	Rank
Roman Tarasov	Russia	100 m T12	11.07	3	Did not advance	
David Dzhatiev	Russia	100 m T35	—N/a		12.06	5
David Dzhatiev	Russia	200 m T35	—N/a		26.02	8
Artem Kalashian	Russia	100 m T35	—N/a		11.70 PB	2nd place, silver medalist(s)
Artem Kalashian	Russia	200 m T35	—N/a		23.88	3rd place, bronze medalist(s)
Dmitrii Safronov	Russia	100 m T35	—N/a		11.79 SB	3rd place, bronze medalist(s)
Dmitrii Safronov	Russia	200 m T35	—N/a		23.78	2nd place, silver medalist(s)
Evgenii Torsunov	Russia	100 m T36	12.08	3 Q	11.95	4
Evgenii Shvetsov	Russia	400 m T36	—N/a		53.67 SB	5
Andrey Vdovin	Russia	100 m T37	11.57	2 Q	11.41	3rd place, bronze medalist(s)
Andrey Vdovin	Russia	200 m T37	23.54	7 Q	22.69 SB	1st place, gold medalist(s)
Andrey Vdovin	Russia	400 m T37	52.15	3 Q	50.27 SB	1st place, gold medalist(s)
Anton Feoktistov	Russia	200 m T37	23.91	10	Did not advance	
Anton Feoktistov	Russia	400 m T37	52.56	7 Q	52.54	8
Fedor Rudakov	Russia	1500 m T11	DNF		Did not advance	
Fedor Rudakov	Russia	5000 m T11	—N/a		DNF	
Anton Kuliatin	Russia	1500 m T13	—N/a		3:44.94 PB	3rd place, bronze medalist(s)
Anton Kuliatin	Russia	5000 m T13	—N/a		15:55.23	3rd place, bronze medalist(s)
Aleksandr Kostin	Russia	1500 m T13	—N/a		3:44.43 PR	1st place, gold medalist(s)
Aleksandr Kostin	Russia	5000 m T13	—N/a		15:52.36	2nd place, silver medalist(s)
Aleksandr Iaremchuk	Russia	1500 m T46	—N/a		3:50.24	1st place, gold medalist(s)
Denis Gavrilov	Russia	Marathon T12	—N/a		2:25:22	4

Women

Athlete	From	Event	Heat		Semifinal		Final	
Athlete	From	Event	Result	Rank	Result	Rank	Result	Rank
Anna Kulinich-Sorokina	Russia	200 m T12	25.97 SB	10 q	DQ		Did not advance	
Anna Kulinich-Sorokina	Russia	400 m T12	57.26 PB	4 q	56.55 PB	5	Did not advance	
Mariia Ulianenko	Russia	400 m T13	58.57 SB	7 q	—N/a		58.96	8
Margarita Goncharova	Russia	100 m T38	12.84	5 q	—N/a		12.96	7
Margarita Goncharova	Russia	400 m T38	1:00.82	2 Q	—N/a		1:00.64	4
Elena Tretiakova	Russia	100 m T37	DNS		—N/a		Did not advance	
Viktoriia Slanova	Russia	100 m T37	13.70	8 q	—N/a		13.82	7
Viktoriia Slanova	Russia	200 m T37	—N/a		—N/a		28.53	6
Viktoriia Slanova	Russia	400 m T37	—N/a		—N/a		1:03.61 PB	3rd place, bronze medalist(s)
Anastasiia Soloveva	Russia	200 m T47	25.74	2 Q	—N/a		26.05	7
Anastasiia Soloveva	Russia	200 m T47	59.00	3 Q	—N/a		58.20	6
Elena Pautova	Russia	1500 m T13	—N/a		—N/a		4:49.57	8

=== Field events ===
Men

Athlete	From	Event	Final	
Athlete	From	Event	Distance	Rank
Uladzislau Hyrb	Belarus	Club throw F51	31.69	6
Uladzislau Hyrb	Belarus	Discus throw F52	12.28 SB	8
Maksim Shavrikov	Russia	Long jump T11	5.93	6
Matvei Iakushev	Russia	Long jump T20	7.51 AR	1st place, gold medalist(s)
Evgenii Torsunov	Russia	Long jump T36	5.83 PR	1st place, gold medalist(s)
Khetag Khinchagov	Russia	Long jump T38	6.52 SB	1st place, gold medalist(s)
Georgii Margiev	Russia	High jump T47	2.00 AR	3rd place, bronze medalist(s)
Nikita Kotukov	Russia	Long jump T47	7.05	3rd place, bronze medalist(s)
Igor Baskakov	Russia	Shot put F11	13.29	4
Igor Baskakov	Russia	Discus throw F11	31.44	7
Aleksei Churkin	Russia	Shot put F32	11.39 SB	2nd place, silver medalist(s)
Aleksei Churkin	Russia	Club throw F32	40.33	1st place, gold medalist(s)
Aleksandr Khrupin	Russia	Shot put F33	11.03	5
Nikita Dubenchuk	Russia	Shot put F34	11.40 AR	4
Taimuraz Khabalov	Russia	Shot put F35	15.19 AR	5
Vladimir Sviridov	Russia	Shot put F36	17.18 WR	1st place, gold medalist(s)
Alan Kokoity	Russia	Shot put F36	16.27 SB	2nd place, silver medalist(s)
Denis Gnezdilov	Russia	Shot put F40	10.80	4
Ivan Revenko	Russia	Javelin throw F54	30.77 PB	1st place, gold medalist(s)
Ivan Revenko	Russia	Shot put F55	9.18	10

Women

Athlete	From	Event	Qualification		Final	
Athlete	From	Event	Distance	Rank	Distance	Rank
Lizaveta Dabravolskaya	Belarus	Javelin throw F13	—N/a		36.71	4
Anna Kulinich-Sorokina	Russia	Javelin throw F13	—N/a		38.10	2nd place, silver medalist(s)
Aleksandra Ruchkina	Russia	Long jump T20	—N/a		5.22	8
Elena Tretiakova	Russia	Long jump T37	—N/a		4.37	4
Margarita Goncharova	Russia	Long jump T38	—N/a		4.74	7
Elena Shakh	Russia	Discus throw F11	—N/a		33.34	7
Svetlana Mironova	Russia	Shot put F20	—N/a		13.68	4
Aleksandra Zaitseva	Russia	Shot put F20	—N/a		13.22	8
Evgeniia Galaktionova	Russia	Club throw F32	—N/a		20.28 SB	10
Evgeniia Galaktionova	Russia	Shot put F32	—N/a		7.72 SB	3rd place, bronze medalist(s)
Nargiza Safarova	Russia	Club throw F32	—N/a		15.35 PB	14
Nargiza Safarova	Russia	Shot put F32	—N/a		6.02 PB	4
Svetlana Krivenok	Russia	Shot put F33	—N/a		7.74 PB	3rd place, bronze medalist(s)
Daria Ivanova	Russia	Shot put F35	—N/a		7.95	7
Irina Vertinskaya	Russia	Shot put F37	—N/a		12.86	3rd place, bronze medalist(s)
Irina Vertinskaya	Russia	Discus throw F38	—N/a		29.15	9
Mariia Bogacheva	Russia	Shot put F54	—N/a		7.09	6
Mariia Bogacheva	Russia	Javelin throw F54	—N/a		14.55	5
Elena Gorlova	Russia	Discus throw F53	—N/a		12.44	5
Ekaterina Vetokhina	Russia	Discus throw F57	24.52	2 q	24.42	10
Ekaterina Vetokhina	Russia	Shot put F57	7.93	2 q	8.12	10

== Paratriathlon ==
The following athletes earned quota places for Neutral Paralympic Athletes in paratriathlon at the 2024 Summer Paralympics.by having a top nine ranking in the World Paratriathlon rankings for their classification on 1 July 2024. Further places may be granted by invitation.

Athlete	From	Event	Swim	Trans 1	Bike	Trans 2	Run	Total time	Rank
Viktor Chebotarev	Russia	Men's PTS3	13:54	1:26	38:29	0:51	21:58	1:16:38	8
Anna Plotnikova	Russia	Women's PTS4	16:56	1:19	38:06	0:42	21:46	1:18:49	6

== Swimming ==
Men

Athlete	From	Event	Heats		Final	
Athlete	From	Event	Result	Rank	Result	Rank
Ihar Boki	Belarus	50 m freestyle S13	23.60	1 Q	23.65	1st place, gold medalist(s)
Ihar Boki	Belarus	400 m freestyle S13	4:13.11	2 Q	3:58.37	1st place, gold medalist(s)
Ihar Boki	Belarus	100 m backstroke S13	58.97	2 Q	56.60	1st place, gold medalist(s)
Ihar Boki	Belarus	100 m butterfly S13	54.23	1 Q	54.13	1st place, gold medalist(s)
Ihar Boki	Belarus	200 m individual medley SM13	2:10.55	1 Q	2:02.03 WR	1st place, gold medalist(s)
Yauheni Kavalionak	Belarus	400 m freestyle S13	4:26.22	8 Q	4:24.73	8
Yauheni Kavalionak	Belarus	100 m backstroke S13	1:05.97	14	Did not advance	
Yauheni Kavalionak	Belarus	100 m breaststroke SB13	1:09.86	9	Did not advance	
Dzmitry Salei	Belarus	50 m freestyle S13	24.38	7 Q	24.48	8
Dzmitry Salei	Belarus	100 m freestyle S12	54.47	5 Q	53.84	5
Dzmitry Salei	Belarus	100 m backstroke S12	1:03.57	4 Q	1:03.12	4
Dzmitry Salei	Belarus	100 m butterfly S12	58.59	3 Q	57.92	2nd place, silver medalist(s)
Yahor Shchalkanau	Belarus	50 m freestyle S9	26.45	10	Did not advance	
Yahor Shchalkanau	Belarus	100 m backstroke S9	1:01.32	1 Q	1:00.76 PR	1st place, gold medalist(s)
Yahor Shchalkanau	Belarus	100 m butterfly S9	1:01.51	3 Q	1:02.48	8
Yahor Shchalkanau	Belarus	200 m individual medley SM9	2:30.12	15	Did not advance	
Maksim Vashkevich	Belarus	100 m freestyle S12	56.96	11	Did not advance	
Maksim Vashkevich	Belarus	100 m backstroke S12	1:03.83	5 Q	1:03.12	4
Maksim Vashkevich	Belarus	100 m butterfly S12	1:00.63	8 Q	1:00.74	8
Dmitrii Boronin	Russia	100 m breaststroke SB11	1:23.21	10	Did not advance	
Dmitrii Cherniaev	Russia	50 m butterfly S5	39.79	10	Did not advance	
Dmitrii Cherniaev	Russia	100 m breaststroke SB4	1:33.91	1 Q	1:32.20	1st place, gold medalist(s)
Dmitrii Cherniaev	Russia	200 m individual medley SM6	2:59.47	14	Did not advance	
Vladimir Danilenko	Russia	200 m freestyle S2	4:13.58	2 Q	4:14.16	2nd place, silver medalist(s)
Vladimir Danilenko	Russia	50 m backstroke S2	56.99	2 Q	57.54	2nd place, silver medalist(s)
Vladimir Danilenko	Russia	100 m backstroke S2	2:02.02	3 Q	2:01.34	2nd place, silver medalist(s)
Egor Efrosinin	Russia	50 m freestyle S7	28.18	4 Q	28.02	3rd place, bronze medalist(s)
Egor Efrosinin	Russia	50 m butterfly S7	30.67	6 Q	29.69	3rd place, bronze medalist(s)
Egor Efrosinin	Russia	200 m individual medley SM7	2:49.38	8 Q	2:48.50	8
Aleksei Ganiuk	Russia	400 m freestyle S7	4:56.68	2 Q	4:57.66	5
Aleksei Ganiuk	Russia	100 m backstroke S7	1:13.24	2 Q	1:12.56	4
Dmitry Grigorev	Russia	50 m freestyle S10	24.62	5 Q	24.62	6
Dmitry Grigorev	Russia	100 m breaststroke SB9	1:10.02	6 Q	1:10.37	7
Dmitry Grigorev	Russia	100 m butterfly S10	1:00.35	9	Did not advance	
Artem Isaev	Russia	100 m breaststroke SB9	1:07.48	1 Q	1:07.29	4
Artem Isaev	Russia	200 m individual medley SM10	2:19.19	6 Q	2:15.65	5
Andrei Kalina	Russia	100 m breaststroke SB8	1:10.61	1 Q	1:09.02	1st place, gold medalist(s)
Andrei Kalina	Russia	200 m individual medley SM9	2:22.32	5 Q	2:19.40	5
Egor Kuzmin	Russia	100 m freestyle S12	57.63	13	Did not advance	
Egor Kuzmin	Russia	100 m backstroke S12	1:11.25	13	Did not advance	
Egor Kuzmin	Russia	100 m butterfly S12	59.07	5 Q	1:00.58	7
Bogdan Mozgovoi	Russia	50 m freestyle S9	26.06	7 Q	25.92	7
Bogdan Mozgovoi	Russia	100 m backstroke S9	1:03.22	4 Q	1:01.93	3rd place, bronze medalist(s)
Bogdan Mozgovoi	Russia	200 m individual medley SM9	2:21.58	3 Q	2:18.08	4
Maksim Nikiforov	Russia	100 m breaststroke SB13	1:08.29	8 Q	1:07.85	8
Andrei Nikolaev	Russia	100 m freestyle S8	59.63	6 Q	58.50	4
Andrei Nikolaev	Russia	400 m freestyle S8	4:32.87	4 Q	4:24.00	3rd place, bronze medalist(s)
Artem Pavlenko	Russia	100 m breaststroke SB14	1:08.14	7 Q	1:08.60	7
Kirill Pulver	Russia	50 m freestyle S5	33.64	6 Q	32.96	6
Kirill Pulver	Russia	100 m freestyle S5	1:10.53	1 Q	1:09.41	3rd place, bronze medalist(s)
Kirill Pulver	Russia	200 m freestyle S5	2:34.31	2 Q	2:27.32	2nd place, silver medalist(s)
Kirill Pulver	Russia	50 m backstroke S5	39.64	9	Did not advance	
Daniil Smirnov	Russia	100 m breaststroke SB8	1:12.56	6 Q	1:11.59	4
Vladimir Sotnikov	Russia	400 m freestyle S13	4:17.80	6 Q	4:14.61	5
Vladimir Sotnikov	Russia	100 m backstroke S13	58.32	1 Q	57.95	2nd place, silver medalist(s)
Vladimir Sotnikov	Russia	100 m butterfly S13	59.64	9	Did not advance	
Vladimir Sotnikov	Russia	200 m individual medley SM13	2:14.64	2 Q	2:10.56	3rd place, bronze medalist(s)
Denis Tarasov	Russia	50 m freestyle S9	25.37	4 Q	25.15	2nd place, silver medalist(s)
Roman Zhdanov	Russia	50 m freestyle S4	47.92	12	Did not advance	
Roman Zhdanov	Russia	100 m freestyle S4	1:26.42	8 Q	1:22.96	6
Roman Zhdanov	Russia	200 m freestyle S4	3:04.80	6 Q	2:53.01	2nd place, silver medalist(s)
Roman Zhdanov	Russia	50 m backstroke S4	42.90	1 Q	42.30	1st place, gold medalist(s)
Roman Zhdanov	Russia	150 m individual medley SM4	2:31.43	1 Q	2:23.03	1st place, gold medalist(s)

Women

Athlete	From	Event	Heats		Final	
Athlete	From	Event	Result	Rank	Result	Rank
Anastasiya Zudzilava	Belarus	100 m breaststroke SB13	1:22.15	7 Q	1:22.15	7
Anastasiya Zudzilava	Belarus	200 m individual medley SM13	2:47.34	11	Did not advance	
Nataliia Butkova	Russia	50 m freestyle S4	44.36	9	Did not advance	
Nataliia Butkova	Russia	100 m freestyle S5	1:36.63	15	Did not advance	
Nataliia Butkova	Russia	50 m backstroke S4	—N/a		56.78	7
Nataliia Butkova	Russia	150 m individual medley SM4	2:55.71	1 Q	2:54.68	2nd place, silver medalist(s)
Irina Deviatova	Russia	200 m freestyle S5	3:15.80	11	Did not advance	
Irina Deviatova	Russia	100 m breaststroke SB4	1:59.81	6 Q	2:01.15	7
Irina Deviatova	Russia	50 m butterfly S5	57.19	12	Did not advance	
Irina Deviatova	Russia	200 m individual medley SM5	3:55.70	9	Did not advance	
Viktoriia Ishchiulova	Russia	50 m freestyle S8	31.10	3 Q	30.79	3rd place, bronze medalist(s)
Viktoriia Ishchiulova	Russia	100 m backstroke S8	1:17.50	2 Q	1:14.97	2nd place, silver medalist(s)
Viktoriia Ishchiulova	Russia	100 m breaststroke SB8	1:26.96	7 Q	1:24.50	3rd place, bronze medalist(s)
Viktoriia Ishchiulova	Russia	100 m butterfly S8	1:13.97	3 Q	1:11.62	2nd place, silver medalist(s)
Viktoriia Ishchiulova	Russia	200 m individual medley SM8	2:43.20	1 Q	2:40.65	2nd place, silver medalist(s)
Elena Kliachkina	Russia	100 m backstroke S9	1:17.69	13	Did not advance	
Elena Kliachkina	Russia	100 m breaststroke SB8	1:32.45	14	Did not advance	
Diana Koltsova	Russia	50 m backstroke S2	1:11.11	4 Q	1:12.00	5
Diana Koltsova	Russia	100 m backstroke S2	2:27.90	4 Q	2:32.68	4
Mariia Latritskaia	Russia	50 m freestyle S13	29.03	18	Did not advance	
Mariia Latritskaia	Russia	100 m breaststroke SB13	1:21.52	6 Q	1:20.58	6
Daria Lukianenko	Russia	100 m freestyle S11	1:07.77	3 Q	1:04.88 WR	1st place, gold medalist(s)
Daria Lukianenko	Russia	400 m freestyle S11	5:06.06	2 Q	5:04.37	3rd place, bronze medalist(s)
Daria Lukianenko	Russia	100 m backstroke S11	1:18.12	3 Q	1:16.64 AR	3rd place, bronze medalist(s)
Daria Lukianenko	Russia	100 m breaststroke SB11	1:22.76	1 Q	1:18.31 PR	1st place, gold medalist(s)
Daria Lukianenko	Russia	200 m individual medley SM11	2:47.77	3 Q	2:37.77 WR	1st place, gold medalist(s)
Ani Palian	Russia	50 m freestyle S8	34.25	14	Did not advance	
Ani Palian	Russia	100 m freestyle S7	1:16.63	13	Did not advance	
Ani Palian	Russia	50 m butterfly S7	37.72	7 Q	37.84	7
Natalia Pavliukova	Russia	100 m breaststroke SB4	2:03.23	8 Q	2:01.61	8
Natalia Pavliukova	Russia	200 m individual medley SM5	4:28.15	15	Did not advance	
Mariia Pavlova	Russia	400 m freestyle S8	5:38.55	12	Did not advance	
Mariia Pavlova	Russia	100 m breaststroke SB7	1:31.25	1 Q	1:26.09 WR	1st place, gold medalist(s)
Mariia Pavlova	Russia	100 m butterfly S8	1:22.67	10	Did not advance	
Mariia Pavlova	Russia	200 m individual medley SM8	3:02.37	12	Did not advance	
Adelina Razetdinova	Russia	100 m breaststroke SB8	1:28.42	9	Did not advance	
Valeriia Shabalina	Russia	200 m freestyle S14	2:12.47	4 Q	2:05.10	1st place, gold medalist(s)
Valeriia Shabalina	Russia	100 m backstroke S14	1:08.99	2 Q	1:06.68	2nd place, silver medalist(s)
Valeriia Shabalina	Russia	100 m butterfly S14	1:05.37	4 Q	1:04.40	3rd place, bronze medalist(s)
Valeriia Shabalina	Russia	200 m individual medley SM14	2:30.16	4 Q	2:22.40	1st place, gold medalist(s)
Zoia Shchurova	Russia	100 m freestyle S3	2:04.09	5 Q	2:05.05	6
Zoia Shchurova	Russia	50 m backstroke S3	58.12	2 Q	58.36	2nd place, silver medalist(s)
Zoia Shchurova	Russia	50 m breaststroke SB3	1:09.13	8 Q	1:03.59	5
Anastasiia Shevchenko	Russia	50 m freestyle S11	32.32	11	Did not advance	
Anastasiia Shevchenko	Russia	100 m freestyle S11	1:12.14	9	Did not advance	
Anastasiia Shevchenko	Russia	400 m freestyle S11	5:42.41	9	Did not advance	
Anastasiia Shevchenko	Russia	100 m backstroke S11	1:20.49	8 Q	1:19.95	7
Anastasiia Shevchenko	Russia	200 m individual medley SM11	3:10.25	9	Did not advance	
Elizaveta Sidorenko	Russia	50 m freestyle S10	28.58	11	Did not advance	
Elizaveta Sidorenko	Russia	100 m freestyle S10	1:05.12	15	Did not advance	
Elizaveta Sidorenko	Russia	100 m backstroke S10	1:17.02	12	Did not advance	
Elizaveta Sidorenko	Russia	100 m breaststroke SB9	1:19.59	6 Q	1:19.65	6
Aleksandra Ziablitseva	Russia	400 m freestyle S13	4:53.99	6 Q	4:49.47	6
Aleksandra Ziablitseva	Russia	100 m backstroke S13	—N/a		1:09.46	4
Aleksandra Ziablitseva	Russia	100 m butterfly S13	1:11.60	15	Did not advance	
Aleksandra Ziablitseva	Russia	200 m individual medley SM13	2:38.02	9	Did not advance	

== Table tennis ==
Neutral Paralympic Athletes secure one singles spot for the Paralympic gamess qualified for the games through the allocations of ITTF final world ranking.

Athlete	From	Event	Round of 16	Quarterfinals	Semifinals	Final	Rank
Athlete	From	Event	Opposition Result	Opposition Result	Opposition Result	Opposition Result	Rank
Ivan Karpov	Russia	Men's individual C10	Bohéas (FRA); L 0–3	Did not advance			=9
Maliak Alieva	Russia	Women's individual C6	Bye	Grebe (GER); W 3–0	Al-Dayyeni (IRQ); L 1–3	Did not advance	3rd place, bronze medalist(s)
Elena Litvinenko	Russia	Women's individual C8	Kelmer (BRA); L 0–3	Did not advance			=9
Elena Prokofeva	Russia	Women's individual C11	Macurová (CZE); W 3–1	Wong (HKG); W 3–0	Furukawa (JPN); W 3–2	Wada (JPN); L 1–3	2nd place, silver medalist(s)
Maliak Alieva; Elena Litvinenko	Russia	Women's doubles WD14	—N/a	Huang / Jin (CHN); L 1–3	Did not advance		=5

== Taekwondo ==
Neutral Paralympic Athletes entered two athletes to compete at the Paralympics competition. Elena Savinskaya qualified for Paris 2024, by virtue of finishing within the top six in the Paralympic rankings in their respective class. Meanwhile, Aliskhab Ramazanov qualified for Paris 2024, following the triumph of his gold medal results in men's 80 kg classes, at the 2024 European Qualification Tournament in Sofia, Bulgaria.

Athlete	From	Event	First round	Quarterfinals	Semifinals	Repechage	Final / BM	
Athlete	From	Event	Opposition Result	Opposition Result	Opposition Result	Opposition Result	Opposition Result	Rank
Aliaskhab Ramazanov	Russia	Men's +80 kg	Gegeu (SOL); W 16–0	Mikulić (CRO); W 21–6	Medell (USA); W 19–17	—N/a	Bush (GBR); L 0–5	2nd place, silver medalist(s)
Elena Savinskaya	Russia	Women's –65 kg	Dassi (CMR); L 2–15	Did not advance				

== See also ==
- Individual Neutral Athletes at the 2024 Summer Olympics
