= Athletics at the 2024 Summer Paralympics – Women's 200 metres T12 =

Women's 200 metres T12 at the XVII Paralympic Games
- Venue: Stade de France
- Dates: 6 September 2024 (heats & semi-finals); 7 September 2024 (final)
- Competitors: 19 from 16 nations
- Winning time: 23.62

Medalists
1st place, gold medalist(s)		Omara Durand; Guide: Yuniol Kindelan Vargas	Cuba
2nd place, silver medalist(s)		Alejandra Paola Pérez López	Venezuela
3rd place, bronze medalist(s)		Simran Sharma; Guide: Abhay Singh	India

200 metres at the 2024 Summer Paralympics
Men · T35 · T37 · T51 · T64
Women · T11 · T12 · T35 · T36 · T37 · T47 · T64

The women's 200 metres T12 event at the 2024 Summer Paralympics in Paris, took place between 6 and 7 September 2024.

The T12 category is for athletes with visual impairment. Athletes in this category will generally have some residual sight, the ability to recognise the shape of a hand at a distance of 2 metres and the ability to perceive clearly will be no more than 2/60. T12 athletes commonly run with guides.

== Records ==
Prior to the competition, the existing records were as follows:

World record	Omara Durand (CUB)	23.02	(Japan) Tokyo	4 September 2021
Paralympic record	Omara Durand (CUB)	23.02	(Japan) Tokyo	4 September 2021

Area	Time		Athlete	Location	Date
Africa	25.72		(Angola) Evalina Alexandre	(China) Beijing	16 September 2008
America	23.02	WR	(Cuba) Omara Durand	(Japan) Tokyo	4 September 2021
Asia	24.66		(China) Zhou Guohua	(United Kingdom) London	6 September 2012
Europe	23.65		(Ukraine) Oksana Boturchuk	(Brazil) Rio de Janeiro	12 September 2016
Oceania	31.80	Record mark			

== Results ==
=== Heats ===
All heats took place on 6 September 2024 with the first in each heat (Q) and the next 7 fastest (q) advancing to the semi-finals

==== Heat 1 ====
Rank	Lane	Athlete	Nation	Time	Notes
1	3	Katrin Mueller-Rottgardt; Guide: Noel-Phillippe Fiener	Germany	25.20	Q, SB
2	5	Anna Kulinich-Sorokina; Guide: Ilia Goncharov	Neutral Paralympic Athletes	25.97	q, SB
3	1	Viviane Ferreira Soares; Guide: Newton Viera de Almeida Jr	Brazil	27.47	
4	7	Melissa Tillner; Guide: Victor Duarte Adorno	Paraguay	33.74	SB
Source:				Wind: +0.8 m/s	

==== Heat 2 ====
Rank	Lane	Athlete	Nation	Time	Notes
1	5	Omara Durand; Guide: Yuniol Kindelan Vargas	Cuba	24.78	Q, SB
2	7	Oksana Boturchuk; Guide: Mykyta Barbanov	Ukraine	25.44	q, SB
3	1	Lorraine Gomes de Aguiar; Guide: Fernando Martins Ribiero Jr	Brazil	26.65	q
4	3	Nagore Folgado García; Guide: Joan Varo Raga	Spain	26.74	
Source:				Wind: +0.5 m/s	

==== Heat 3 ====
Rank	Lane	Athlete	Nation	Time	Notes
1	1	Melani Bergés Gámez; Guide: Sergio Diaz del Campo Velazquez	Spain	25.79	Q, PB
2	7	Darlenys de la Cruz; Guide: Fary Sterlin Mejia Nunez	Dominican Republic	25.80	q
3	5	Shen Yaqin; Guide: Li Wen	China	27.27	
4	3	Estere Nagoli; Guide: Charles Luciano Phiri	Malawi	32.11	PB
Source:				Wind: +0.7 m/s	

==== Heat 4 ====
Rank	Lane	Athlete	Nation	Time	Notes
1	1	Hajar Safarzadeh	Iran	25.04	Q, PB
2	7	Clara Daniele Barros da Silva; Guide: Efaim Andrade	Brazil	26.31	q
3	3	Iida Lounela; Guide: Henrik Lounela	Finland	28.33	
4	5	Heidilene Patricia Oliveira; Guide: Jailson Manuel Duarte Oliviera	Cape Verde	28.49	SB
Source:				Wind: +0.4 m/s	

==== Heat 5 ====
Rank	Lane	Athlete	Nation	Time	Notes
1	1	Simran Sharma; Guide: Abhay Singh	India	25.41	Q
2	7	Alejandra Paola Pérez López; Guide: Markinzon Dan Manzanilla Velazquez	Venezuela	25.94	q, SB
3	3	Valentina Petrillo	Italy	25.95	q, SB
Source:				Wind: +0.4 m/s	

=== Semi-finals ===
The semi-finals took place on 6 September 2024 with the first in each heat (Q) and the next fastest (q) advancing to the Final.

==== Heat 1 ====
Rank	Lane	Athlete	Nation	Time	Notes
1	5	Omara Durand; Guide: Yuniol Kindelan Vargas	Cuba	24.41	Q SB
2	3	Oksana Boturchuk; Guide: Mykyta Barbanov	Ukraine	25.46	
3	7	Darlenys de la Cruz; Guide: Fary Sterlin Mejia Nunez	Dominican Republic	25.58	
4	1	Lorraine Gomes de Aguiar; Guide: Fernando Martins Ribiero Jr	Brazil	26.55	
Source:				Wind: -0.4 m/s	

==== Heat 2 ====
Rank	Lane	Athlete	Nation	Time	Notes
1	7	Alejandra Paola Pérez López	Venezuela	24.59	Q PB
2	5	Hajar Safarzadeh	Iran	25.06	q
3	3	Melani Bergés Gámez; Guide: Sergio Diaz del Campo Velazquez	Spain	25.43	PB
4	1	Clara Daniele Barros da Silva; Guide: Efaim Andrade	Brazil	26.31	
Source:				Wind: +1.0 m/s	

==== Heat 3 ====
Rank	Lane	Athlete	Nation	Time	Notes
1	5	Simran Sharma; Guide: Abhay Singh	India	25.03	Q
2	3	Katrin Mueller-Rottgardt; Guide: Noel-Phillippe Fiener	Germany	25.15	SB
3	7	Valentina Petrillo	Italy	25.92	SB
—	1	Anna Kulinich-Sorokina; Guide: Ilia Goncharov	Neutral Paralympic Athletes	DQ	R17.8
Source:				Wind: -0.5 m/s	

=== Final ===
The final took place on 7 September 2024:

Rank	Lane	Athlete	Nation	Time	Notes
1st place, gold medalist(s)	3	Omara Durand; Guide: Yuniol Kindelan Vargas	Cuba	23.62	SB
2nd place, silver medalist(s)	5	Alejandra Paola Pérez López	Venezuela	24.19	PB
3rd place, bronze medalist(s)	7	Simran Sharma; Guide: Abhay Singh	India	24.75	PB
4	1	Hajar Safarzadeh	Iran	24.91	PB
Source:				Wind: -0.9 m/s	
