= Athletics at the 2024 Summer Paralympics – Women's 200 metres T11 =

Women's 200 metres T11 at the XVII Paralympic Games
- Venue: Stade de France
- Dates: 5 September 2024 (round 1); 7 September 2024 (final)
- Competitors: 8 from 6 nations
- Winning time: 24.51 =PB

Medalists
1st place, gold medalist(s)		Jerusa Geber dos Santos; Guide: Gabriel Aparecido dos Santos	Brazil
2nd place, silver medalist(s)		Liu Cuiqing; Guide: Chen Shengming	China
3rd place, bronze medalist(s)		Lahja Ishitile; Guide: Sem Shimanda	Namibia

200 metres at the 2024 Summer Paralympics
Men · T35 · T37 · T51 · T64
Women · T11 · T12 · T35 · T36 · T37 · T47 · T64

The women's 200 metres T11 event at the 2024 Summer Paralympics in Paris, took place on 5 and 7 September 2024.

The T11 category is for athletes with a visual impairment. A T11 athlete may be entirely without sight, or be able to perceive light, but have no ability to see the shape of a hand at any distance. T11 athletes commonly run with guides.

== Records ==
World record	Liu Cuiqing (CHN)	24.36	(Japan) Kobe	25 May 2024
Paralympic record	Libby Clegg (GBR)	24.51	(Brazil) Rio de Janeiro	13 September 2016

Area	Time	Athlete	Location	Date
Africa				
America				
Asia				
Europe				
Oceania				

== Results ==
=== Heats ===
The Heats were held on 5 September. First in each heat (Q) and the next 2 fastest (q) advance to the final.

=== Heat 1 ===
Rank	Lane	Athlete	Nation	Time	Notes
1	6	Jerusa Geber dos Santos; Guide: Gabriel Aparecido dos Santos	Brazil	25.00	Q
2	8	Linda Patricia Perez Lopez; Guide: Alvaro Luis Cassiano Herrera	Venezuela	25.42	q SB
3	2	Lorena Spoladore	Brazil	26.02	
4	4	Asila Mirzayorova; Guide: Abduvokhid Mirzayorov	Uzbekistan	27.31	SB
Source:				Wind: +0.1 m/s	

=== Heat 2 ===
Rank	Lane	Athlete	Nation	Time	Notes
1	6	Liu Cuiqing; Guide: Chen Shengming	China	24.77	Q
2	8	Lahja Ishitile; Guide: Sem Shimanda	Namibia	24.82	q AR
3	2	Thalita Simplicio; Guide: Felipe Veloso da Silva	Brazil	25.70	
4	6	Juliana Ngleya Moko; Guide: Abraao Abreu Sapalo	Angola	26.28	PB
Source:				Wind: +0.1 m/s	

=== Final ===
The final took place on 7 September 2024.

Rank	Lane	Athlete	Nation	Time	Notes
1st place, gold medalist(s)	5	Jerusa Geber dos Santos; Guide: Gabriel Aparecido dos Santos	Brazil	24.51	=PR
2nd place, silver medalist(s)	3	Liu Cuiqing; Guide: Chen Shengming	China	24.86	
3rd place, bronze medalist(s)	7	Lahja Ishitile; Guide: Sem Shimanda	Namibia	25.04	
4	1	Linda Patricia Perez Lopez; Guide: Alvaro Luis Cassiano Herrera	Venezuela	25.44	
Source:				Wind: +0.5 m/s	
