= Athletics at the 2024 Summer Paralympics – Women's 200 metres T37 =

Women's 200 metres T37 at the XVII Paralympic Games
- Venue: Stade de France
- Dates: 31 August 2024 (final)
- Competitors: 9
- Winning time: 25.86 PR

Medalists
1st place, gold medalist(s)		Wen Xiaoyan	China
2nd place, silver medalist(s)		Nataliia Kobzar	Ukraine
3rd place, bronze medalist(s)		Jiang Fenfen	China

200 metres at the 2024 Summer Paralympics
Men · T35 · T37 · T51 · T64
Women · T11 · T12 · T35 · T36 · T37 · T47 · T64

The women's 200 metres T37 event at the 2024 Summer Paralympics in Paris, took place on 31 August 2024.

The T37 category is for ambulant athletes with cerebral palsy. These athletes have movement and coordination problems on one half of their body. They have good ability in their dominant side of their body (ie hemiplegia).

== Records ==
Prior to the competition, the existing event records were as follows:

World record	Wen Xiaoyan (CHN)	25.75	(Japan) Kobe	25 May 2024
Paralympic record	Wen Xiaoyan (CHN)	26.58	(Japan) Tokyo	27 August 2021

Area	Time	Athlete	Location	Date
Africa				
America				
Asia				
Europe				
Oceania				

== Results ==
=== Final ===
The event went straight to final.

The final in this classification took place on 31 August 2024, at 12:23. 9 athletes took part. The final in this classification took place on 30 August 2024, at 19:57:

Rank	Lane	Name	Nationality	Time	Notes
1st place, gold medalist(s)	8	Wen Xiaoyan	China	25.86	PR
2nd place, silver medalist(s)	9	Nataliia Kobzar	Ukraine	27.43	SB
3rd place, bronze medalist(s)	6	Jiang Fenfen	China	27.55	
4	2	Jaleen Roberts	United States	27.99	SB
5	5	Mandy Francois-Elie	France	28.20	
6	3	Viktoriia Slanova	Neutral Paralympic Athletes	28.53	
7	4	Sheryl James	South Africa	29.08	
8	1	Aorawan Chimpaen	Thailand	33.04	
9	7	Taylor Swanson	United States	44.85	
				Wind: +0.1 m/s	
