= Sheriauna Haase =

Canadian athlete (born 2006)

Personal information
- Full name: Sheriauna Elaine Haase
- Born: October 1, 2006 (age 20)
- Home town: Toronto, Ontario, Canada

Sport
- Country: Canada
- Sport: Para athletics
- Disability class: T47
- Coached by: Bob Westman
Medal record
Women's para athletics
Representing Canada
Parapan American Games
Bronze medal – third place	2023 Santiago	100m T47
Bronze medal – third place	2023 Santiago	200m T47
Commonwealth Games
Gold medal – first place	2026 Glascow	100m T47

Sheriauna Elaine Haase (born October 1, 2006) is a Canadian para-athletics athlete, actor, and dancer. She won two bronze medals at the 2023 Parapan American Games. She played Adele in the ninth and tenth seasons of The Next Step.

== Early life and education ==
Haase was born with a congenital limb reduction. She began running in elementary school. Haase's mother, Sherylee Honeyghan, wrote the children's book, I am Sheriauna, about her daughter and her disability, published in 2017. She attends the Wexford Collegiate School for the Arts in Toronto.

== Career ==
=== Para-athletics ===
Haase made her world championships debut in 2023 at the World Para Athletics Championships in Paris, placing fifth in the women's T47 100m. She set a Canadian record of 12.42 seconds in the final. She competed in the women's T47 100m and 200m at the 2023 Parapan American Games and was the youngest Canadian athlete on the para-athletics team. Haase won the bronze medal in both races.

Haase competed at the 2024 World Para Athletics Championships and placed fourth in the T47 200 metres, with a new personal best time of 25.55 seconds. She competed at the 2024 Summer Paralympics in para-athletics, placing fourth in women's T47 100-metre. At the 2025 World Para Athletics Championships, Haase placed 8th in the T47 200m final with a time of 26.19 seconds. She qualified for the final with a season’s best time of 25.69 seconds, placing 4th in her heat.

Haase placed second in the women's T47 100 metres at the 2026 Canadian Track & Field Championships. At the 2026 Commonwealth Games, she won gold in the women's T47 100 metres. She raced a time of 12.23 seconds, breaking her own Canadian record and setting a Commonwealth Games record.

=== Advocacy ===
Haase is an ambassador for Holland Bloorview Children's Rehabilitation Hospital. She was a face of the hospital's seventh annual Capes for Kids campaign.

=== Acting and dance ===
In 2023, it was announced that Haase would play Adele on the ninth season of the Canadian television series, The Next Step. She played the role in the show's ninth and tenth seasons. She also appeared in the series, Circuit Breakers.

== Filmography ==
=== Television ===
Year	Title	Role	Notes
2022	Circuit Breakers	Tess	Episode: "Parental Controls"
2024- 2025	The Next Step	Adele	Main Character (Season 9); Recurring role (Season 10)
