= Aleksandr Kostin (athlete) =

Russian Paralympic athlete (born 1995)

Personal information
- Native name: Александр Костин
- Born: 4 July 1995 (age 30) Biysk, Russia

Sport
- Sport: Paralympic athletics
- Disability class: T12
- Event: long-distance running
- Club: Altai State Pedagogical University
- Coached by: Sergey Manuylov; Aleksei Lashmanov
Medal record
Para-athletics
Representing Neutral Paralympic Athletes
Paralympic Games
Gold medal – first place	2024 Paris	1500 m T13
Silver medal – second place	2024 Paris	5000 m T13
World Championships
Gold medal – first place	2025 New Delhi	5000 m T13
Silver medal – second place	2025 New Delhi	1500 m T13
Bronze medal – third place	2024 Kobe	5000 m T13
Representing RPC
Paralympic Games
Bronze medal – third place	2020 Tokyo	5000 m T13
Representing Russia
World Championships
Bronze medal – third place	2019 Dubai	5000 m T13
European Championships
Gold medal – first place	2021 Bydgoszcz	5000 m T13
Bronze medal – third place	2016 Grosseto	1500 m T13

Aleksandr Kostin (Russian: Александр Костин, born 4 July 1995) is a Russian Paralympic athlete specializing in long-distance running. He represented Russian Paralympic Committee athletes at the 2020 Summer Paralympics.

== Career ==
Kostin represented Russian Paralympic Committee athletes at the 2020 Summer Paralympics in the men's 5000 metres T13 event and won a bronze medal.
