= Athletics at the 2024 Summer Paralympics – Women's 200 metres T35 =

Women's 200 metres T35 at the XVII Paralympic Games
- Venue: Stade de France
- Dates: 1 September 2024 (final)
- Competitors: 8 from 5 nations
- Winning time: 28.15

Medalists
1st place, gold medalist(s)		Zhou Xia	China
2nd place, silver medalist(s)		Guo Qianqian	China
3rd place, bronze medalist(s)		Preethi Pal	India

200 metres at the 2024 Summer Paralympics
Men · T35 · T37 · T51 · T64
Women · T11 · T12 · T35 · T36 · T37 · T47 · T64

The women's 200 metres T35 event at the 2024 Summer Paralympics in Paris, took place on 1 September 2024.

The T35 category is for ambulant athletes with cerebral palsy. The typical T35 athlete may need assistive devices for walking. The athlete may have sufficient function to run but demonstrates poor balance.

== Records ==
Prior to the competition, the existing event records were as follows:

World record	Zhou Xia (CHN)	27.17	(Japan) Tokyo	29 August 2021
Paralympic record	Zhou Xia (CHN)	27.17	(Japan) Tokyo	29 August 2021

Area	Time	Athlete	Location	Date
Africa				
America				
Asia				
Europe				
Oceania				

== Results ==
=== Final ===
This event went straight to final. The final in this classification took place on 1 September 2024, at 19:57:

Rank	Lane	Athlete	Nation	Time	Notes
1st place, gold medalist(s)	6	Zhou Xia	China	28.15	SB
2nd place, silver medalist(s)	8	Guo Qianqian	China	29.09	PB
3rd place, bronze medalist(s)	7	Preethi Pal	India	30.01	PB
4	5	Fatimah Suwaed	Iraq	31.06	PB
5	4	Ingrid Renecka	Poland	31.79	PB
6	9	Jagoda Kibil	Poland	32.13	
7	3	Isabelle Foerder	Germany	34.39	
Source:				Wind: -0.1 m/s	
