= Anton Kuliatin =

Russian Paralympic athlete (born 1991)

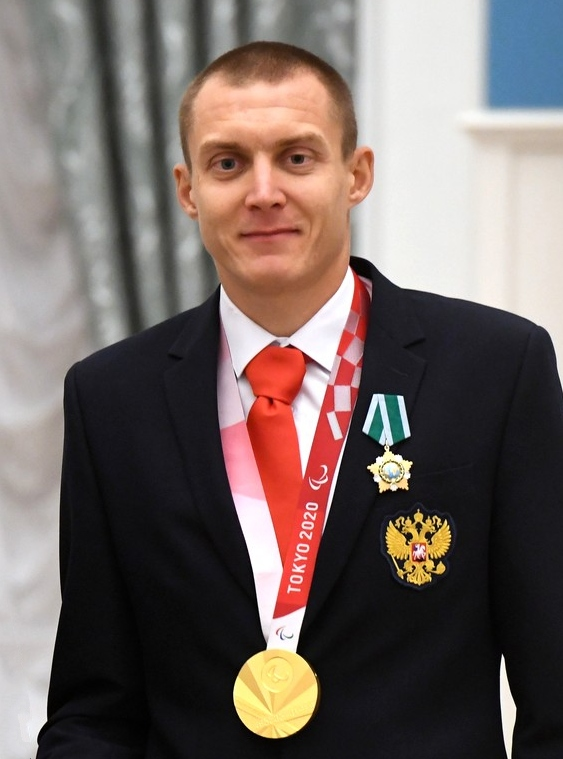
- Kuliatin in 2021

Personal information
- Nationality: Russian
- Born: 31 August 1991 (age 34) Biysk, Russia, Soviet Union
- Education: Novosibirsk State Pedagogical University

Sport
- Sport: Paralympic athletics
- Disability class: T12
- Event: Middle-distance running
- Coached by: Nikolay Khalukhaev
Medal record
Representing Neutral Paralympic Athletes
Paralympic Games
Bronze medal – third place	2024 Paris	1500 m T13
Bronze medal – third place	2024 Paris	5000 m T13
World Championships
Gold medal – first place	2024 Kobe	1500 m T13
Silver medal – second place	2024 Kobe	5000 m T13
Representing RPC
Paralympic Games
Gold medal – first place	2020 Tokyo	1500 m T13
Representing Russia
World Championships
Silver medal – second place	2019 Dubai	1500 m T13
European Championships
Gold medal – first place	2021 Bydgoszcz	1500 m T13
Bronze medal – third place	2021 Bydgoszcz	400 m T12

Anton Sergeyevich Kuliatin (Russian: Антон Сергеевич Кулятин; born 31 August 1991) is a Russian vision-impaired para-athlete who specializes in middle-distance running.

== Career ==
He represented Russian Paralympic Committee athletes at the 2020 Summer Paralympics in the 1500 metres T13 event and won a gold medal.

== Personal life ==
Kuliatin is married to Alla Antipina, an international long-distance runner. He first trained in football, then changed to athletics, and in 2013 moved to Para athletics, after his vision had strongly deteriorated.
