= Athletics at the 2024 Summer Paralympics – Women's 5000 metres T54 =

Athletics – Women's 5000 metres T54 at the XVII Paralympic Games
- Venue: Stade de France
- Dates: 31 August 2024
- Competitors: 12 from 8 nations
- Winning time: 10:43.62 PR

Medalists
| 1st place, gold medalist(s) | | Catherine Debrunner | Switzerland |
| 2nd place, silver medalist(s) | | Susannah Scaroni | United States |
| 3rd place, bronze medalist(s) | | Madison de Rozario | Australia |

5000 metres at the 2024 Summer Paralympics
Men's · T11 · T13 · T54 · Women's · T54

The women's 5000 metres T54 event at the 2024 Summer Paralympics in Paris took place on 31 August 2024. The T54 event was the only 5000 metres race in the women's program for 2024.

== Records ==
Prior to the competition, the existing records were as follows:

| World record | Susannah Scaroni (USA) | 10:25.00 | Nottwil, Switzerland | 8 June 2024 |
| Paralympic record | Susannah Scaroni (USA) | 10:52.57 | Tokyo, Japan | 28 August 2021 |

| Area | Time | | Athlete | Location | Date |
|---|---|---|---|---|---|
| Africa | 11:15.43 | | (Mauritius) Noemi Alphonse | (United Arab Emirates) Sharjah | 6 February 2024 |
| America | 10:25.00 | WR | (United States) Susannah Scaroni | (Switzerland) Nottwil | 8 June 2024 |
| Asia | 11:16.59 | | (China) Tian Yajuan | (United Arab Emirates) Dubai | 1 March 2023 |
| Europe | 10:25.24 | | (Switzerland) Manuela Schär | (Switzerland) Nottwil | 8 June 2024 |
| Oceania | 10:59.05 | | (Australia) Madison de Rozario | (Switzerland) Nottwil | 26 May 2019 |

== Results ==
=== Final ===
The final took place on 31 August 2024, at 10:40:

| Rank | Name | Nationality | Time | Notes |
|---|---|---|---|---|
| 1st place, gold medalist(s) | Catherine Debrunner | Switzerland | 10:43.62 | PR |
| 2nd place, silver medalist(s) | Susannah Scaroni | United States | 10:45.18 | |
| 3rd place, bronze medalist(s) | Madison de Rozario | Australia | 11:10.20 | |
| 4 | Patricia Eachus | Switzerland | 11:10.44 | |
| 5 | Manuela Schaer | Switzerland | 11:10.52 | |
| 6 | Tian Yajuan | China | 11:37.24 | SB |
| 7 | Merle Menje | Germany | 11:49.97 | |
| 8 | Shauna Bocquet | Ireland | 11:50.85 | |
| 9 | Jenna Fesemyer | United States | 12:19.68 | |
| – | Eden Rainbow-Cooper | Great Britain | DNF | |
