= New Zealand at the 2024 Summer Paralympics =

- IPC code: NZL
- NPC: Paralympics New Zealand
- Website: paralympics.org.nz

in Paris, France 28 August 2024 – 8 September 2024
- Competitors: 24 in 8 sports
- Flag bearers: Anna Grimaldi; Cameron Leslie
- Medals Ranked 51st: Gold 1 Silver 4 Bronze 4 Total 9

Summer Paralympics appearances (overview)
- 1968; 1972; 1976; 1980; 1984; 1988; 1992; 1996; 2000; 2004; 2008; 2012; 2016; 2020; 2024

New Zealand competed at the 2024 Summer Paralympics in Paris, France, from 28 August to 8 September.

== Medallists ==
| Medal | Name | Sport | Event | Date |
|---|---|---|---|---|
| Gold | Anna Grimaldi | Athletics | Women's 200 m T47 | 7 September |
| Silver | Anna Taylor | Cycling | Women's pursuit C4 | 30 August |
| Silver | Danielle Aitchison | Athletics | Women's 200 m T36 | 1 September |
| Silver | William Stedman | Athletics | Men's 400 m T36 | 3 September |
| Silver | Danielle Aitchison | Athletics | Women's 100 m T36 | 4 September |
| (bronze) Bronze | Nicole Murray | Cycling | Women's pursuit C5 | 1 September |
| Bronze | Anna Grimaldi | Athletics | Women's 100 m T47 | 3 September |
| Bronze | Holly Robinson | Athletics | Women's shot put F46 | 4 September |
| Bronze | Peter Cowan | Paracanoeing | Men's VL3 | 8 September |

== Competitors ==
The following is the list of number of competitors in the Games.

| Sport | Men | Women | Total |
|---|---|---|---|
| Athletics | 2 | 4 | 6 |
| Badminton | 1 | 0 | 1 |
| Cycling | 2 | 2 | 4 |
| Equestrian | 0 | 1 | 1 |
| Paracanoeing | 2 | 0 | 2 |
| Shooting | 2 | 1 | 3 |
| Swimming | 3 | 3 | 6 |
| Table tennis | 1 | 0 | 1 |
| Total | 13 | 11 | 24 |

== Athletics ==
In April 2024, New Zealand announced a squad of four track and field athletes to compete at the Summer Paralympics — Holly Robinson, Anna Grimaldi, William Stedman and Mitch Joynt. In July 2024, sprinters Danielle Aitchison and Anna Steven were added to the team completing the Paris 2024 lineup.

Key

- Note–Ranks given for track events are within the athlete's heat only
- Q = Qualified for the next round
- q = Qualified for the next round as a fastest loser or, in field events, by position without achieving the qualifying target
- DQ = Disqualified
- PR = Paralympic Record
- AR = Area (or continental) Record
- NR = National Record
- N/A = Round not applicable for the event
- Bye = Athlete not required to compete in round

Track & road events

| Athlete | Event | Heat | | Final | |
| Athlete | Event | Result | Rank | Result | Rank |
|---|---|---|---|---|---|
| Danielle Aitchison | Women's 100 m T36 | 13.74 | 1 Q | 13.43 | 2nd place, silver medalist(s) |
| Danielle Aitchison | Women's 200 m T36 | 28.09 PR | 1 Q | 27.64 | 2nd place, silver medalist(s) |
| Anna Grimaldi | Women's 100 m T47 | 12.23 | 3 Q | 12.20 AR | 3rd place, bronze medalist(s) |
| Anna Grimaldi | Women's 200 m T47 | 25.09 AR | 1 Q | 24.72 AR | 1st place, gold medalist(s) |
| Mitch Joynt | Men's 200 m T64 | 23.20 | 3 Q | 23.16 | 7 |
| William Stedman | Men's 100 m T36 | 12.41 | 4 q | 12.35 | 6 |
| William Stedman | Men's 400 m T36 | —N/a | | 52.92 | 2nd place, silver medalist(s) |
| Anna Steven | Women's 200 m T64 | 29.13 | 4 q | 29.37 | 8 |

Field events

| Athlete | Event | Final | |
| Athlete | Event | Distance | Position |
|---|---|---|---|
| Anna Grimaldi | Women's long jump T47 | 5.75 | 4 |
| Holly Robinson | Women's javelin throw F46 | 39.03 | 6 |
| Holly Robinson | Women's shot put F46 | 11.88 | 3rd place, bronze medalist(s) |
| William Stedman | Men's long jump T36 | 5.74 | 4 |

== Badminton ==
In May 2024, Polish-born Wojtek Czyz was named as New Zealand's first-ever badminton representative for the Summer Paralympics.

| Athlete | Event | Group stage | | | | Semifinal | Final / BM | |
| Athlete | Event | Opposition Score | Opposition Score | Opposition Score | Rank | Opposition Score | Opposition Score | Rank |
|---|---|---|---|---|---|---|---|---|
| Wojtek Czyz | Men's singles SL3 | Bethell (GBR); L (5–21, 2–21) | Chyrkov (UKR); L (16–21, 10–21) | Fujihara (JPN); L (8–21, 12–21) | 4 | Did not advance | | =7 |

== Cycling ==
In July 2024, New Zealand announced a team of five cyclists to compete at the Summer Paralympics — Devon Briggs, Rory Mead, Nicole Murray, Anna Taylor and Ben Westenberg. However, Westenberg withdrew from the Paralympics the day before competition began, due to concussion as a result of a crash during the New Zealand team's final training session in Switzerland.

Road

| Athlete | Event | Final | |
| Athlete | Event | Result | Rank |
|---|---|---|---|
| Devon Briggs | Men's time trial C3 | DNS | |
| Devon Briggs | Men's road race C1–3 | DNS | |
| Rory Mead | Men's time trial H2 | 29:22.41 | 5 |
| Rory Mead | Men's road race H1–2 | 1:40:34 | 4 |
| Nicole Murray | Women's time trial C5 | 21:46.26 | 4 |
| Nicole Murray | Women's road race C4–5 | DNS | |
| Anna Taylor | Women's time trial C4 | 23:48.67 | 7 |

Track

| Athlete | Event | Qualification | | Final | |
| Athlete | Event | Result | Rank | Result | Rank |
|---|---|---|---|---|---|
| Devon Briggs | Men's kilo C1–2–3 | 1:08.505 | 7 | Did not advance | |
| Devon Briggs | Men's pursuit C3 | 3:27.017 | 5 | Did not advance | |
| Nicole Murray | Women's 500m C4–5 | 37.367 | 6 Q | 37.425 | 5 |
| Nicole Murray | Women's pursuit C5 | 3:37.599 | 3 QB | 3:36.206 | 3rd place, bronze medalist(s) |
| Anna Taylor | Women's pursuit C4 | 3:42.137 | 2 Q | OVL | 2nd place, silver medalist(s) |

== Equestrian ==
Equestrian Louise Duncan and her horse Showcase BC qualified for the paralympic equestrian competition, after finishing third in each of their three classes against Australia's top Para equestrian riders in April 2024.

Individual

| Athlete | Horse | Event | Total | |
| Athlete | Horse | Event | Score | Rank |
|---|---|---|---|---|
| Louise Duncan | Showcase BC | Individual championship test grade IV | 64.945 | 13 |

== Paracanoeing ==
In June 2024, New Zealand announced a team of two para canoe athletes for the Summer Paralympics — Peter Cowan and Scott Martlew.

Key

- Note–Ranks given for preliminary rounds are within the canoeist's heat only.
- FA = Qualified for Final A
- FB = Qualified for Final B
- SF = Advanced to Semifinals

| Athlete | Event | Heats | | Semifinal | | Final | |
| Athlete | Event | Time | Rank | Time | Rank | Time | Rank |
|---|---|---|---|---|---|---|---|
| Peter Cowan | Men's VL3 | 50.17 | 2 SF | 48.93 | 2 FA | 48.28 | 3rd place, bronze medalist(s) |
| Scott Martlew | Men's KL2 | 43.51 | 1 FA | —N/a | | 42.82 | 5 |
| Scott Martlew | Men's VL3 | 53.03 | 6 SF | 52.34 | 5 FB | 56.86 | 12 |

== Shooting ==
In July 2024, New Zealand confirmed the selection of sport shooter Michael Johnson for his sixth Paralympic games, alongside Greg Reid and Neelam O'Neill.

| Athlete | Event | Qualification | | Final | |
| Athlete | Event | Score | Rank | Score | Rank |
|---|---|---|---|---|---|
| Michael Johnson | Mixed R4 – 10 m rifle standing SH2 | 630.8 | 8 Q | 188.9 | 5 |
| Michael Johnson | Mixed R5 – 10 m rifle prone SH2 | 633.3 | 20 | Did not advance | |
| Michael Johnson | Mixed R9 – 50 m rifle prone SH2 | 616.8 | 19 | Did not advance | |
| Neelam O'Neill | Mixed R3 – 10 m rifle prone SH1 | 629.9 | 21 | Did not advance | |
| Neelam O'Neill | Women's P2 – 10 m air pistol SH1 | 551 | 10 | Did not advance | |
| Greg Reid | Mixed R3 – 10 m rifle prone SH1 | 629.9 | 21 | Did not advance | |
| Greg Reid | Mixed R6 - 50 m rifle prone SH1 | 600.6 | 36 | Did not advance | |

== Swimming ==
In May 2024, New Zealand announced a squad of five swimmers to compete at the Summer Paralympics — Cameron Leslie, Jesse Reynolds, Lili-Fox Mason, Gabriella Smith and Joshua Willmer. In July 2024, Tupou Neiufi was added to the team.

Key

- Note– Qualifiers for the finals (Q) of all events were decided on a time only basis, therefore ranks shown are overall ranks versus competitors in all heats. Also, ranks shown for those who did not advance are their final ranks.
- PR = Paralympic record
- WR = World record
- N/A = Round not applicable for the event

| Athlete | Event | Heat | | Final | |
| Athlete | Event | Time | Rank | Time | Rank |
|---|---|---|---|---|---|
| Cameron Leslie | Men's 50 m freestyle S4 | 37.70 | 4 Q | 37.24 | 4 |
| Cameron Leslie | Men's 100 m freestyle S4 | 1:24.22 | 6 Q | 1:24.03 | 7 |
| Cameron Leslie | Men's 200 m freestyle S4 | 3:06.18 | 8 Q | 3:06.84 | 8 |
| Cameron Leslie | Men's 50 m backstroke S4 | 43.05 | 2 Q | 44.20 | 4 |
| Lili-Fox Mason | Women's 100 m butterfly S10 | 1:12.44 | 13 | Did not advance | |
| Lili-Fox Mason | Women's 400 m freestyle S10 | 5:00.42 | 11 | Did not advance | |
| Tupou Neiufi | Women's 50 m freestyle S8 | 33.40 | 10 | Did not advance | |
| Tupou Neiufi | Women's 100 m backstroke S8 | 1:23.49 | 9 | Did not advance | |
| Jesse Reynolds | Men's 100 m backstroke S9 | 1:04.53 | 5 Q | 1:04.89 | 7 |
| Gabriella Smith | Women's 100 m breaststroke SB9 | 1:20.40 | 7 Q | 1:20.72 | 7 |
| Gabriella Smith | Women's 200 m medley SM10 | 2:38.82 | 7 Q | 2:41.19 | 7 |
| Gabriella Smith | Women's 400 m freestyle S10 | 5:02.31 | 12 | Did not advance | |
| Joshua Willmer | Men's 100 m breaststroke SB8 | 1:12.73 | 9 | Did not advance | |

== Table tennis ==
New Zealand secured one singles spot for the Paralympic Games. Matthew Britz qualified for Paris 2024 by virtue of his gold medal results at the 2023 Oceanian Championships in Honiara, Solomon Islands.

| Athlete | Event | Round of 16 | Quarterfinals | Semifinals | Final / BM | |
| Athlete | Event | Opposition Result | Opposition Result | Opposition Result | Opposition Result | Rank |
|---|---|---|---|---|---|---|
| Matthew Britz | Men's individual C7 | Punpoo (THA); L 2–3 | Did not advance | | | =9 |

== Officials ==
- Delivery team
  - Chef de Mission – Duane Kale
  - Deputy Chef de Mission – Lynette Grace
  - Chief medical officer – Julie Milmine
  - Team doctor – Peter McKenzie
  - Team physiotherapist – Jacinta Horan
  - Preparation and recovery lead – Simeon Joplin
  - Preparation and recovery support – Lucy Jacobs
  - Team psychology co-leads – Rachel McLeod, Louise Davey
  - Team psychologist – Sarah De Wattignar
  - Operations and logistics lead – Chris Morrison
  - Media and content lead – Michelle Pickles
  - Media and content liaison – Rebecca McDonald
  - Pou tuarā, tikanga and cultural lead – Kelly James
  - Team security liaison officer – Scott Anderson
- Athletics
  - Manager – Tim Driesen
  - Coaches – George Edwards, Micheal Jacobs
  - Physiotherapist – Jennifer Scott
  - Team support – Brianna Maynard
- Badminton coach – Marianne Loh
- Paracanoeing
  - Manager / coach – Leigh Barker
  - Coach – Myka Nuku
- Cycling
  - Manager – Brendon Cameron
  - Coaches – Elyse Fraser, Matt Shallcrass, Damian Wiseman
  - Physiotherapist – Lauren Shelley
  - Mechanic – Michael Winter
- Equestrian
  - Coach – Andrea Raves
  - Groom – Justin Duncan
- Shooting
  - Manager – Sonia Bencina
  - Coach – Ricky Zhao
  - Loader / support person – Janelle McGirr
- Swimming
  - Manager – Amanda White
  - Head coach – Simon Mayne
  - Coach – Thomas Onley
  - Physiotherapist – Graeme White
- Table tennis coach – John Tuki

== See also ==
- New Zealand at the 2024 Summer Olympics
- New Zealand at the Paralympics
