= Uganda at the Paralympics =

- IPC code: UGA
- NPC: Uganda National Paralympic Committee
- Medals: Gold 0 Silver 1 Bronze 1 Total 2

Summer appearances
- 1972; 1976; 1980–1992; 1996; 2000; 2004; 2008; 2012; 2016; 2020; 2024

Winter appearances
- 1976; 1980; 1984–2022

Uganda has competed at both the Summer and Winter Paralympic Games.

The country made its Paralympic début at the 1972 Summer Paralympics in Heidelberg, Germany, where it sent two male athletes to compete in javelin and shot put. It competed again in 1976, with a single athlete in the men's javelin, then ceased to compete in the Summer Games until 1996, when it fielded a single male competitor in powerlifting. Since then, Uganda has taken part in every edition of the Summer Paralympic Games, although it had only one representative in 2000 (women's swimming), two in 2004 (women's athletics and men's powerlifting), and one in 2008 (men's powerlifting).

Uganda was the only African country to take part in the 1976 Winter Paralympics. It sent only one representative, Tofiri Kibuuka in cross-country skiing, who thus became the first African to compete at the Winter Paralympic Games. Uganda was again the only African nation at the 1980 Winter Paralympics, once more with Kibuuka as its sole representative. Kibuuka subsequently obtained Norwegian nationality, and ceased to represent Uganda. Uganda has not taken part in any edition of the Winter Paralympics since 1980. Uganda was the only tropical nation ever to have competed at the Winter Paralympics, until Brazil made their debut in 2014 and one is of only two African countries to have done so, the other being South Africa, since 1998.

Uganda took part in the 2012 Summer Paralympics, and the Uganda National Paralympic Committee selected Bedford as the UK training base for its Paralympians. Christine Akullo competed in the women's 100m T13 and David Emong competed in 1500m and 5000m T46

== Medalist ==
Medal	Name	Games	Sport	Event	Date
Silver	David Emong	(Brazil) 2016 Rio de Janeiro	Athletics	Men's 1500m T45-46	16 September
Bronze	David Emong	(Japan) 2020 Tokyo	Athletics	Men's 1500m T46	28 August

== See also ==
- Uganda at the Olympics
