= Armenia at the 2026 Winter Paralympics =

- Flag of Armenia
- IPC code: ARM
- NPC: Armenian Paralympic Committee

in Milan & Cortina d'Ampezzo, Italy 6 March 2026 – 15 March 2026
- Competitors: 1 (1 man) in 1 sport
- Flag bearer (opening): Garik Melkonyan
- Flag bearer (closing): Volunteer
- Medals: Gold 0 Silver 0 Bronze 0 Total 0

Winter Paralympics appearances (overview)
- 1998; 2002; 2006; 2010; 2014; 2018; 2022; 2026

Other related appearances
- Soviet Union (1988); Unified Team (1992)

Armenia will compete at the 2026 Winter Paralympics in Milan & Cortina d'Ampezzo, Italy, which will take place between 6–15 March 2026.

== Competitors ==
The following is the list of number of competitors participating at the Games per sport/discipline.

Sport	Men	Women	Total
Para cross-country skiing	1	0	1
Total	1	0	1

== Para cross-country skiing ==
Athlete	Class	Event	Qualification		Semifinal		Final	
Athlete	Class	Event	Time	Rank	Time	Rank	Time	Rank
Garik Melkonyan	LW6	Men's 10 km classical, standing	—N/a				33:02.2	15
Garik Melkonyan	LW6	Men's 20 km freestyle, standing	—N/a				53:11.0	26
Garik Melkonyan	LW6	Men's sprint classical, standing	3:00.45	29	Did not advance			

== See also ==
- Armenia at the Paralympics
- Armenia at the 2026 Winter Olympics
