= Armenia at the 2024 Summer Paralympics =

- Flag of Armenia
- IPC code: ARM
- NPC: Armenian Paralympic Committee

in Paris, France August 28, 2024 – September 8, 2024
- Competitors: 3 (2 men and 1 woman) in 2 sports
- Flag bearers: Smbat Karapetyan; Greta Vardanyan
- Medals: Gold 0 Silver 0 Bronze 0 Total 0

Summer Paralympics appearances (overview)
- 1996; 2000; 2004; 2008; 2012; 2016; 2020; 2024

Other related appearances
- Soviet Union (1988); Unified Team (1992)

Armenia competed at the 2024 Summer Paralympics in Paris, France, from 28 August to 8 September.

== Competitors ==
The following is the list of number of competitors in the Games.

Sport	Men	Women	Total
Athletics	2	0	2
Powerlifting	0	1	1
Total	2	1	3

== Athletics ==
Key

- Note–Ranks given for track events are within the athlete's heat only
- Q = Qualified for the next round
- q = Qualified for the next round as a fastest loser or, in field events, by position without achieving the qualifying target
- DQ = Disqualified
- PR = Paralympic Record
- AR = Area (or continental) Record
- NR = National Record
- N/A = Round not applicable for the event
- Bye = Athlete not required to compete in round

Track & road events

Athlete	Event	Heat		Final	
Athlete	Event	Result	Rank	Result	Rank
Smbat Karapetyan	Men's 100 m T54	16.98	6	Did not advance	

Field events

Athlete	Event	Final	
Athlete	Event	Result	Rank
Sargis Stepanyan	Men's shot put F55	10.41	8

== Powerlifting ==
Athlete	Event	Attempts (kg)				Result (kg)	Rank
Athlete	Event	1	2	3	4	Result (kg)	Rank
Greta Vardanyan	Women's –61 kg	104	108	114	—	114	6

== See also ==
- Armenia at the 2024 Summer Olympics
- Armenia at the Paralympics
