= Madagascar at the 2016 Summer Paralympics =

- IPC code: MAD
- NPC: Federation Malgache Handisport

in Rio de Janeiro
- Competitors: 1 in 1 sports
- Flag bearer: Revelinot Raherinandrasana
- Medals: Gold 0 Silver 0 Bronze 0 Total 0

Summer Paralympics appearances (overview)
- 2000; 2004; 2008; 2012; 2016; 2020; 2024

Madagascar sent a delegation to compete at the 2016 Summer Paralympics in Rio de Janeiro, Brazil, from 7 to 18 September 2016. This was the island country's fourth appearance at a Summer Paralympic Games since it made its debut sixteen years prior at the 2000 Summer Paralympics. Sprinter Revelinot Raherinandrasana was the sole athlete to represent the nation in Rio de Janeiro. In his event, the men's 1500 metres T45–T46, he finished tenth and last out of all the finishing athletes with a time of 4 minutes and 38.60 seconds.

== Background ==
Madagascar first competed in the Paralympics at the 2000 Summer Paralympics in Sydney, Australia. With the exception of the 2004 Summer Paralympics, they have sent a delegation to most Summer Paralympic Games since, making Rio de Janeiro its fourth time participating at a Summer Paralympiad. The 2016 Summer Paralympics were held from 7–18 September 2016 with a total of 4,328 athletes representing 159 National Paralympic Committees (NPC) taking part. Madagascar sent a solitary athlete to Rio de Janeiro: athletics competitor Revelinot Raherinandrasana. He was accompanied by chef de mission and president of the Federation Malgache Handisport (the NPC of Madagascar (FMH)) Monja Dinard, FMH secretary-general Olivier Razafimandimby, doctor Mamy Andrianaly and administrative director Temisy Aristide Andriamahavonjy. The delegation departed for Rio de Janeiro on 2 September. Raherinandrasana was chosen as the flag bearer during the parade of nations for the opening ceremony.

== Disability classification ==
Every participant at the Paralympics has their disability grouped into one of five disability categories; amputation, the condition may be congenital or sustained through injury or illness; cerebral palsy; wheelchair athletes, there is often overlap between this and other categories; visual impairment, including blindness; Les autres, any physical disability that does not fall strictly under one of the other categories, for example dwarfism or multiple sclerosis. Each Paralympic sport then has its own classifications, dependent upon the specific physical demands of competition. Events are given a code, made of numbers and letters, describing the type of event and classification of the athletes competing. Some sports, such as athletics, divide athletes by both the category and severity of their disabilities, other sports, for example swimming, group competitors from different categories together, the only separation being based on the severity of the disability.

== Athletics ==
Revelinot Raherinandrasana was 38 years old at the time of the Rio Summer Paralympic Games. These Rio de Janeiro Games were his second time competing in the Summer Paralympics after he represented Madagascar at the 2012 Summer Paralympics. Raherinandrasana is a left arm amputee and is classified as T46. He qualified for the Games because the International Paralympic Committee granted him a wild card slot. Monja Dinard, president of the FMH, said that the NPC expected Raherinandrasana to improve on his performance from four years earlier because it felt the runner would be more comfortable competing in a middle-distance competition rather than a sprint. On 16 September, he competed in the men's 1500 metres T45–T46 event with ten other athletes. Raherinandrasana finished the race in a time of 4 minutes and 38.60 seconds, which put him tenth and last of all those who finished. (Note: One athlete, Chaoyan Li, did not finish.) Samir Nouioua of Algeria won the gold medal in a time of 3 minutes and 59.46 seconds, the silver medal was taken by David Emong of Uganda, and the bronze medal was claimed by Michael Roeger of Australia. He did not receive official recognition for his performance because of a lack of focus on sport in Madagascar and he returned to his job as a laundry worker with his wife.

=== Men's Track ===
Athlete	Events	Final	
Athlete	Events	Time	Rank
Revelinot Raherinandrasana	1500 m T45–46	4:38.60	10

== See also ==
- Madagascar at the 2016 Summer Olympics
