= Armenia at the Paralympics =

- IPC code: ARM
- NPC: Armenian Paralympic Committee
- Medals: Gold 0 Silver 0 Bronze 0 Total 0

Summer appearances
- 1996; 2000; 2004; 2008; 2012; 2016; 2020; 2024

Winter appearances
- 1998; 2002; 2006; 2010; 2014; 2018; 2022

Other related appearances
- Soviet Union (1988); Unified Team (1992)

Armenia made its Paralympic Games début at the 1996 Summer Paralympics in Atlanta, with just two entries: Gagik Gasparian in powerlifting (men's up to 82 kg), and a four-person team in the mixed crewboat event in sailing. Two years later, Armenia made its Winter Paralympics début, with eight competitors in alpine skiing. The country has participated in every subsequent event of both the Summer and Winter Paralympics, although its delegations have generally been small.

No Armenian has ever won a Paralympic medal, though Mher Avanesyan was one of few athletes to have competed at both Summer and Winter Games. He competed in alpine skiing in 1998, 2002, 2006 and 2010, and in sailing in 2000.

The Armenian Paralympic Committee is a member of the European Paralympic Committee.

== See also ==
- Armenia at the Olympics
- Armenian National Disabled Sports Federation
- Armenian Olympic Committee
- Sport in Armenia
