= Athletics at the 2020 Summer Paralympics – Men's marathon T46 =

Men's marathon T46 at the XVI Paralympic Games
- Venue: Tokyo National Stadium
- Dates: 5 September 2021
- Competitors: 12 from 10 nations
- Winning time: 2:25:50

Medalists
| 1st place, gold medalist(s) | | Li Chaoyan | China |
| 2nd place, silver medalist(s) | | Alex Pires da Silva | Brazil |
| 3rd place, bronze medalist(s) | | Tsutomu Nagata | Japan |

The men's marathon T46 event at the 2020 Summer Paralympics in Tokyo, took place on 5 September 2021.

The T46 category is for athletes who have a single above or below elbow amputation or similar disability, with normal function in both legs.

== Records ==
Prior to the competition, the existing records were as follows:

| World Record | Michael Roeger (AUS) | 2:18:53 | Sydney, Australia | 25 April 2021 |
| Paralympic Record | Mario Santillán Hernández (MEX) | 2:27:04 | Beijing, China | 17 September 2008 |

| Area | Time | Athlete | Nation |
|---|---|---|---|
| Africa | 2:30:44 | Abdelhadi El Harti | Morocco |
| America | 2:27:04 PR | Mario Santillán Hernández | Mexico |
| Asia | 2:25:23 | Tsutomu Nagata | Japan |
| Europe | 2:26:54 | Abderrahman Ait Khamouch | Spain |
| Oceania | 2:18:53 WR | Michael Roeger | Australia |

== Results ==
The race took place on 5 September 2021, at 6:50:

| Rank | Name | Nationality | Time | Notes |
|---|---|---|---|---|
| 1st place, gold medalist(s) | Li Chaoyan | China | 2:25:50 | GR |
| 2nd place, silver medalist(s) | Alex Pires da Silva | Brazil | 2:27:00 | AR |
| 3rd place, bronze medalist(s) | Tsutomu Nagata | Japan | 2:29:33 | |
| 4 | Aleksandr Iaremchuk | RPC | 2:31:42 | PB |
| 5 | Zhao Guocun | China | 2:33:11 | |
| 6 | Michael Roeger | Australia | 2:34:45 | |
| 7 | Efraín Sotacuro | Peru | 2:41:20 | |
| 8 | Manuel Mendes | Portugal | 2:45:11 | |
| 9 | Derek Rae | Great Britain | 2:47:04 | SB |
| 10 | Hávard Vatnhamar | Faroe Islands | 2:58:27 | PB |
| 11 | Carlos Ivan Sangama Sangama | Peru | 3:00:50 | SB |
| | Abdelhadi El Harti | Morocco | DNF | |
