= Bulgaria women's national goalball team =

Bulgarian national team, for the Paralympic sport of goalball

Bulgaria women's national goalball team is the women's national team of Bulgaria. Goalball is a team sport designed specifically for athletes with a vision impairment. The team takes part in international competitions.

== Regional championships ==
The team can compete in the IBSA Europe goalball region.

The 1985 European Championships were held in Olsztyn, Poland with six teams competing. The team finished sixth.

== See also ==
- Disabled sports
- Bulgaria at the Paralympics
