= Armenia at the 2004 Summer Paralympics =

- IPC code: ARM
- NPC: Armenian National Paralympic Committee

in Athens
- Competitors: 2 in 2 sports
- Medals: Gold 0 Silver 0 Bronze 0 Total 0

Summer Paralympics appearances (overview)
- 1996; 2000; 2004; 2008; 2012; 2016; 2020; 2024

Other related appearances
- Soviet Union (1988); Unified Team (1992)

Armenia competed at the 2004 Summer Paralympics in Athens, Greece. The team included two athletes, one man and one woman, neither of whom won a medal.

== Sports ==
=== Archery ===
Athlete	Event	Ranking round		Round of 32	Round of 16	Quarterfinals	Semifinals	Finals	
Athlete	Event	Score	Seed	Opposition score	Opposition score	Opposition score	Opposition score	Opposition score	Rank
Marine Hakobyan	Women's individual W1/W2	101	16	—	Hirasawa (JPN); L 101-142	did not advance			

=== Powerlifting ===
Athlete	Event	Result	Rank
Gevorg Karakashayan	Men's 67.5kg	137.5	9

== See also ==
- Armenia at the Paralympics
- Armenia at the 2004 Summer Olympics
