= Armenia at the 2012 Summer Paralympics =

- IPC code: ARM
- NPC: Armenian National Paralympic Committee

in London
- Competitors: 2 in 2 sports
- Medals: Gold 0 Silver 0 Bronze 0 Total 0

Summer Paralympics appearances (overview)
- 1996; 2000; 2004; 2008; 2012; 2016; 2020; 2024

Other related appearances
- Soviet Union (1988); Unified Team (1992)

Armenia competed at the 2012 Summer Paralympics in London, United Kingdom from August 29 to September 9, 2012.

== Powerlifting ==
Women

Athlete	Event	Result	Rank
Greta Vardanyan	-48kg	82	7

== Swimming ==
Women

Athletes	Event	Heat		Final	
Athletes	Event	Time	Rank	Time	Rank
Maga Hovakimyan	100m breaststroke SB5	2:21.88	14	did not advance	

== See also ==
- Armenia at the 2012 Summer Olympics
