= Bulgaria at the 2026 Winter Paralympics =

- IPC code: BUL
- NPC: Bulgarian Paralympic Association

in Milan and Cortina d'Ampezzo, Italy 6 March 2026 – 15 March 2026
- Competitors: 1 (1 woman) in 1 sport
- Flag bearer (opening): Stela Yanchovichina
- Flag bearer (closing): Stela Yanchovichina
- Medals: Gold 0 Silver 0 Bronze 0 Total 0

Winter Paralympics appearances (overview)
- 1994; 1998; 2002; 2006; 2010; 2014; 2018; 2022; 2026

Bulgaria competed at the 2026 Winter Paralympics in Milan and Cortina d'Ampezzo, Italy, which took place between 6–15 March 2026.

== Competitors ==
The following is the list of number of competitors participating at the Games per sport/discipline.

| Sport | Men | Women | Total |
|---|---|---|---|
| Para alpine skiing | 0 | 1 | 1 |
| Total | 0 | 1 | 1 |

== Para alpine skiing ==
| Athlete | Class | Event | Run 1 | | Run 2 | | Total | |
| Athlete | Class | Event | Time | Rank | Time | Rank | Time | Rank |
|---|---|---|---|---|---|---|---|---|
| Stela Yanchovichina | LW6/8-2 | Women's giant slalom, standing | 1:39.21 | 19 | 1:43.83 | 16 | 3:23.04 | 16 |
| Stela Yanchovichina | LW6/8-2 | Women's slalom, standing | 1:03.06 | 17 | 1:05.36 | 16 | 2:08.42 | 16 |

== See also ==
- Bulgaria at the Paralympics
- Bulgaria at the 2026 Winter Olympics
