= Disability in Burundi =

People with disability in Burundi is estimated to be around 350,000 people.

== History ==
Burundi signed the Convention on the Rights of Persons with Disabilities on 26 April 2007 and ratified it on 22 May 2014. It went into effect on 21 June 2014.

== See also ==
- Burundi at the Paralympics
