= Burundi at the Paralympics =

- IPC code: BDI
- NPC: Comité National Olympique du Burundi
- Medals: Gold 0 Silver 0 Bronze 0 Total 0

Summer appearances
- 1960; 1964; 1968; 1972; 1976; 1980; 1984; 1988; 1992; 1996; 2000; 2004; 2008; 2012; 2016; 2020; 2024

Burundi made its Paralympic Games début at the 2008 Summer Paralympics in Beijing, sending three male athletes to compete in racing events for arm amputees (T46 category). None of them won a medal, although Rémy Nikobimeze did come fifth (out of 15) in the 5,000m race.

Burundi has never taken part in the Winter Paralympics.

== Medal tables ==
=== Medals by Summer Games ===
Games	Athletes	Gold	Silver	Bronze	Total	Rank
2008 Beijing	3	0	0	0	0	-
2012 London	1	0	0	0	0	-
2016 Rio de Janeiro	1	0	0	0	0	-
2020 Tokyo	2	0	0	0	0	-
2024 Paris	2	0	0	0	0	-
2028 Los Angeles	Future Event					
2032 Brisbane	Future Event					
Total		0	0	0	0	-

== Full results for Burundi at the Paralympics ==
Name	Games	Sport	Event	Time	Rank
Fidele Manirambona	2008 Beijing	Athletics	Men's 1,500m T46	4:16.54	10th (out of 12) in heat 1; did not advance
Leonidas Ahishakiye	2008 Beijing	Athletics	Men's 1,500m T46	4:16.78	11th (out of 11) in heat 2; did not advance
Rémy Nikobimeze	2008 Beijing	Athletics	Men's 5,000m T46	15:07.95	5th (out of 15)
Rémy Nikobimeze	2012 London	Athletics	Men's 800m T46	2:00.25	6th (out of 10) in heat 2; did not advance
Rémy Nikobimeze	2012 London	Athletics	Men's 1,500m T46	4:10.70	6th (out of 9) in heat 1; did not advance
Rémy Nikobimeze	2016 Rio	Athletics	Men's 1,500m T46	4:10.00	8th (out of 11)
Rémy Nikobimeze	2020 Tokyo	Athletics	Men's 1,500m T46	4:05.44	10th (out of 12)
Adéline Mushiranzigo	2020 Tokyo	Athletics	Women's 400m T47	1:16.84	6th (out of 6) in heat 2; did not advance
Rémy Nikobimeze	2024 Paris	Athletics	Men's 1,500m T46	4:10.69	14th (out of 16)
Adéline Mushiranzigo	2024 Paris	Athletics	Women's 400m T47	1:19.78	7th (out of 7) in heat 1; did not advance

== See also ==
- Burundi at the Olympics
