= Uganda at the 2012 Summer Paralympics =

- IPC code: UGA
- NPC: Uganda National Paralympic Committee

in London
- Competitors: 2 in 1 sport
- Medals: Gold 0 Silver 0 Bronze 0 Total 0

Summer Paralympics appearances (overview)
- 1972; 1976; 1980–1992; 1996; 2000; 2004; 2008; 2012; 2016; 2020; 2024

Uganda competed at the 2012 Summer Paralympics in London, United Kingdom from August 29 to September 9, 2012.

== Athletics ==
David Emong's fourth-place finish in the men's 1500m T46 at these Games was the closest the country every came to winning at medal at the Paralympic Games.

Athlete	Event	Heat		Final	
Athlete	Event	Result	Rank	Result	Rank
David Emong	Men's 1500m T46	4:01.54	4 q	3:58.47	4
Christine Akullo	Women's 100m T13	DNS		Did not advance	
Christine Akullo	Women's 400m T13	—		DNS	

== See also ==
- Uganda at the Paralympics
- Uganda at the 2012 Summer Olympics
