= Athletics at the 2024 Summer Paralympics – Men's shot put F55 =

Men's shot put F55 at the XVII Paralympic Games
- Venue: Stade de France, Paris
- Date: 30 August 2024
- Competitors: 11 from 10 nations

Medalists
1st place, gold medalist(s)		Ruzhdi Ruzhdi	Bulgaria
2nd place, silver medalist(s)		Nebojsa Duric	Serbia
2nd place, silver medalist(s)		Zafar Zaker	Iran
3rd place, bronze medalist(s)		Lech Stoltman	Poland

The Athletics at the 2024 Summer Paralympics – Men's shot put F55 event at the 2024 Summer Paralympics in Paris, took place on 30 August 2024.

== Classification ==
The event is open to F54 and F55 athletes. These athletes are seated when throwing, they have normal arm muscle power. F54 athletes have no trunk movement, while F55 have full or nearly full trunk movement. F55 athletes may have flickers of hip flexor.

== Records ==
Prior to the competition, the existing records were as follows:

F54 Records

World record	Sergei Sokulskii RPC	12.06m	(Japan) Tokyo	27 August 2021
Paralympic record	Sergei Sokulskii RPC	12.06m	(Japan) Tokyo	27 August 2021

F55 Records

World record	Ruzhdi Ruzhdi (BUL)	12.68m	(France) Paris	9 July 2023
Paralympic record	Wallace Santos (BRA)	12.63m	(Japan) Tokyo	27 August 2021

== Results ==
=== Final ===
The final in this classification took place on 30 August 2024:

Rank	Athlete	Nationality	Class	1	2	3	4	5	6	Best	Notes
1st place, gold medalist(s)	Ruzhdi Ruzhdi	Bulgaria	F55	12.36	11.96	12.40	12.34	12.02	12.27	12.40	SB
2nd place, silver medalist(s)	Nebojsa Duric	Serbia	F55	11.69	11.98	11.47	11.93	11.77	11.95	11.98	SB
2nd place, silver medalist(s)	Zafar Zaker	Iran	F55	11.56	11.88	11.73	11.55	11.77	11.83	11.88	
3rd place, bronze medalist(s)	Lech Stoltman	Poland	F55	11.81	x	11.72	11.68	11.59	11.52	11.81	
4	Wallace Santos	Brazil	F55	11.10	11.10	11.41	11.68	11.43	11.41	11.68	
5	Olokhan Musayev	Azerbaijan	F55	11.13	11.22	x	11.44	11.41	11.35	11.44	SB
6	Hamed Amiri	Iran	F55	10.60	x	10.83	10.96	11.08	11.36	11.36	
7	Damian Ligeza	Poland	F55	11.18	11.01	10.78	10.68	10.84	10.71	11.18	
8	Sargis Stepanyan	Armenia	F55	10.06	10.20	9.87	9.96	10.41	10.19	10.41	
9	Ivan Revenko	Neutral Paralympic Athletes	F54	8.58	8.45	9.18	7.95	9.17	9.16	9.18	
10	Fadi Aldeeb	Palestine	F55	8.59	8.63	8.81	8.47	8.63	8.30	8.81	SB

Notes: Nebojsa Duric initially had his results annulled. On 3 September 2024, after a request by World Para Athletics to the International Paralympic Committee, Duric was awarded the Silver medal, sharing the position with Zafar Zaker. Bronze medalist Lech Stoltman also retained his medal. On 6 September, Duric's results were reinstated with no change to other athletes ranks.
