= Armenia at the 1996 Summer Paralympics =

- IPC code: ARM
- NPC: Armenian National Paralympic Committee

in Atlanta
- Competitors: 5
- Medals: Gold 0 Silver 0 Bronze 0 Total 0

Summer Paralympics appearances (overview)
- 1996; 2000; 2004; 2008; 2012; 2016; 2020; 2024

Other related appearances
- Soviet Union (1988); Unified Team (1992)

Five male athletes from Armenia competed at the 1996 Summer Paralympics in Atlanta, United States.

== See also ==
- Armenia at the Paralympics
- Armenia at the 1996 Summer Olympics
