= Athletics at the 2016 Summer Paralympics – Men's 1500 metres T46 =

Men's 1500 metres T46 at the XV Paralympic Games
- Venue: Estádio Olímpico João Havelange
- Dates: 16 September 2016
- Competitors: 11 from 10 nations

Medalists
| 1st place, gold medalist(s) | | Samir Nouioua | Algeria |
| 2nd place, silver medalist(s) | | David Emong | Uganda |
| 3rd place, bronze medalist(s) | | Michael Roeger | Australia |

The T46 category is for athletes who have a single above or below elbow amputation or similar disability, with normal function in both legs.

The Athletics at the 2016 Summer Paralympics – Men's 1500 metres T46 event at the 2016 Paralympic Games took place on 16 September 2016, at the Estádio Olímpico João Havelange.

== Final ==
18:20 16 September 2016:

| Rank | Lane | Bib | Name | Nationality | Reaction | Time | Notes |
|---|---|---|---|---|---|---|---|
| 1st place, gold medalist(s) | 1 | 1019 | Samir Nouioua | Algeria | | 3:59.46 | |
| 2nd place, silver medalist(s) | 4 | 2316 | David Emong | Uganda | | 4:00.62 | |
| 3rd place, bronze medalist(s) | 2 | 1062 | Michael Roeger | Australia | | 4:01.34 | |
| 4 | 6 | 2269 | Bechir Agoubi | Tunisia | | 4:05.07 | |
| 5 | 5 | 2098 | Hermas Muvunyi | Rwanda | | 4:05.19 | |
| 6 | 8 | 1444 | Hailu Haile | Ethiopia | | 4:06.37 | |
| 7 | 10 | 1178 | Hristiyan Stoyanov | Bulgaria | | 4:08.99 | |
| 8 | 9 | 1095 | Remy Nikobimeze | Burundi | | 4:10.00 | |
| 9 | 3 | 1443 | Astbha Gebre Gebremeskel | Ethiopia | | 4:15.01 | |
| 10 | 7 | 1840 | Revelinot Raherinandrasana | Madagascar | | 4:38.60 | |
| | 11 | 1247 | Chaoyan Li | China | | | DSQ |
