= Madagascar at the Paralympics =

- IPC code: MAD
- NPC: Federation Malgache Handisport
- Medals: Gold 0 Silver 0 Bronze 0 Total 0

Summer appearances
- 2000; 2004; 2008; 2012; 2016; 2020; 2024

Madagascar made its Paralympic Games début at the 2000 Summer Paralympics in Sydney. Its sole representative, Aina Onja, was a blind sprinter who ran the men's 100m sprint in the T11 category. His time of 13.98 was the slowest in the heats, and he did not advance to the semi-finals.

The country was absent from the 2004 Games, but returned to the Paralympics in 2008, represented by a single male swimmer. Josefa Harijaona Randrianony swam in the 50m freestyle (S9 category), and finished last of his heat in 38.06s.

Madagascar has never competed at the Winter Paralympics.

== Full results for Madagascar at the Paralympics ==
Name	Games	Sport	Event	Time	Rank
Aina Obja	2000 Sydney	Athletics	Men's 100 m T11	13.98	3rd (last) in heat 3; did not advance
Josefa Harijaona Randrianony	2008 Beijing	Swimming	Men's 50 m Freestyle S9	38.06	8th (last) in heat 2; did not advance
Revelinot Raherinandrasana	2012 London	Athletics	Men's 200 m T46	26.41	4th (out of 7) in heat 2; did not advance
Revelinot Raherinandrasana	2016 Rio	Athletics	Men's 1500 m T46	4:38.60	10th (out of 11)

== See also ==
- Madagascar at the Olympics
