= Armenia at the 2020 Summer Paralympics =

- Flag of Armenia
- IPC code: ARM
- NPC: National Paralympic Committee Armenia

in Tokyo, Japan August 24, 2021 – September 5, 2021
- Competitors: 1 (1 man and 0 women) in 1 sport
- Medals: Gold 0 Silver 0 Bronze 0 Total 0

Summer Paralympics appearances (overview)
- 1996; 2000; 2004; 2008; 2012; 2016; 2020; 2024

Other related appearances
- Soviet Union (1988); Unified Team (1992)

Armenia participated at the 2020 Summer Paralympics in Tokyo, Japan, from 24 August to 5 September 2021. This was the country's seventh consecutive appearance at the Summer Paralympics since 1996.

== Competitors ==
The following is the list of number of competitors participating in the Games:

Sport	Men	Women	Total
Athletics	1	0	1

== Athletics ==
Men's track

Athlete	Event	Heats		Final	
Athlete	Event	Result	Rank	Result	Rank
Stas Nazaryan	100m T54	18.76	6	did not advance	

== See also ==
- Armenia at the Paralympics
- Armenia at the 2020 Summer Olympics
