= Ramón (surname) =

Ramón or Ramon is a Spanish surname. Notable people with the surname include:

- Alonso García de Ramón (c. 1552–1610), Spanish soldier
- Anselmo Ramon (born 1988), Brazilian footballer
- Antonio Ramón (1879–1924), Spanish anarchist
- Charkey Ramon (born Dave Bruce Ballard in 1950), Australian boxer
- David Ramón (born 1974), Andorran sailor
- Domingo Ramón (born 1958), Spanish retired long-distance runner
- Einat Ramon (born 1959), first Israeli-born woman rabbi
- Gaston Ramon (1886–1963), French veterinarian and biologist
- Haim Ramon (born 1950), Israeli politician and former Minister of Justice
- Ilan Ramon (1954–2003), Israeli Air Force pilot and first Israeli astronaut
- Juan Ramón, several people
- Lodario Ramón (born 1954), Spanish weightlifter and powerlifting coach
- Miriam Ramón (born 1973), Ecuadorian racewalker
- Mariam Ramón Climent (born 1976), Spanish retired female tennis player
- Nacho Ramón (born 1999), Spanish footballer
- Pablo Ramón (born 2001), Spanish professional footballer
- Raúl de Ramón (1929–1984), Chilean composer, musician, folklorist, and author
- Ronald Ramón (born 1986), Dominican basketball coach
- Santiago Ramón y Cajal (1852–1934), Spanish neuroscientist, pathologist, and histologist
- Silvia Ramón-Cortés (born 1972), Spanish former professional tennis player
- Steve Ramon (born 1979), Belgian motocross racer
