= Uganda at the 2020 Summer Paralympics =

- IPC code: UGA
- NPC: Uganda National Paralympic Committee

in Tokyo
- Competitors: 4 in 3 sports
- Flag bearers: Husnah Kukundakwe; David Emong
- Medals Ranked =78th: Gold 0 Silver 0 Bronze 1 Total 1

Summer Paralympics appearances (overview)
- 1972; 1976; 1980–1992; 1996; 2000; 2004; 2008; 2012; 2016; 2020; 2024

Uganda sent a delegation to compete in the 2020 Summer Paralympics in Tokyo in Japan originally scheduled to take place in 2020 but postponed to 23 July to 8 August 2021 because of the COVID-19 pandemic. This was the country's ninth appearance in the Summer Paralympics since debuting at the 1972 Summer Paralympics.

== Medalists ==
Medal	Name	Sport	Event	Date
Bronze	David Emong	Athletics	Men's 1500 metres T46	28 August

== Competitors ==
Sport	Men	Women	Total
Athletics	1	1	2
Badminton	0	1	1
Swimming	0	1	1
Total	1	3	4

== Athletics ==
=== Men ===
Track

Athlete	Event	Heat		Final	
Athlete	Event	Result	Rank	Result	Rank
David Emong	1500m T46	N/A		3:53.51 PB	Bronze

=== Women ===
Track

Athlete	Event	Heat		Final	
Athlete	Event	Result	Rank	Result	Rank
OROMA Peace	100m T13	13.17 PB	7	Did not advance	

== Badminton ==
Ritah Asiimwe has qualified to compete.

Athlete	Event	Group Stage				Quarterfinal	Semifinal	Final / BM	
Athlete	Event	Opposition Score	Opposition Score	Opposition Score	Rank	Opposition Score	Opposition Score	Opposition Score	Rank
Ritah Asiimwe	Women's singles SU5	Yang (CHN); L (2–21, 6–21)	Hollander (NED); L (6–21, 7–21)	Monteiro (POR); L (2–21, 5–21)	4	Did not advance			

== See also ==
- Uganda at the 2020 Summer Olympics
