= Uganda at the 2008 Summer Paralympics =

- IPC code: UGA
- NPC: Uganda National Paralympic Committee

in Beijing
- Competitors: 1 in 1 sport
- Medals: Gold 0 Silver 0 Bronze 0 Total 0

Summer Paralympics appearances (overview)
- 1972; 1976; 1980–1992; 1996; 2000; 2004; 2008; 2012; 2016; 2020; 2024

Uganda sent a delegation to compete at the 2008 Summer Paralympics in Beijing, China, which took place from September 6 to 17, 2008. According to official records, the only athlete was powerlifter Billy Ssengendo. The country did not win any medal during these games.

== Key details ==
- Athletes: The sole representative in powerlifter Billy Ssengendo
- Coach: Haruna Sendagire accompanied the athlete.
- Result: Uganda did not secure any medals at these Games.
- Context: Uganda had participated intermittently in the Paralympics, with a sole representative athlete, primarily in powerlifting.

== Powerlifting ==
- Billy Ssengendo was the sole representative for Uganda, competing in Men's Powerlifting.
- He participated in the 48 kg category event.
- Billy Ssengendo did not successfully record a lift in the competition, finishing with a result of "No Mark" men.

Athlete	Event	Result	Rank
Billy Ssengendo	60 kg	152.5	10

== Historical context ==
- This was Uganda's sixth appearance at the Summer Paralympic Games since its debut in 1972.
- At the time, Uganda had not yet won its first Paralympic medal; that milestone was later achieved by David Emong in 2016.
- The 2008 delegation was managed by the Uganda National Paralympic Committee.

== See also ==
- Uganda at the Paralympics
- Uganda at the 2008 Summer Olympics
- Uganda at the 2000 Summer Paralympics
- Uganda at the 1972 Summer Paralympics
