= Uganda at the 2024 Summer Paralympics =

2024 sporting event delegation in Paris

- Flag of Uganda
- IPC code: UGA
- NPC: Uganda National Paralympic Committee
- Website: ugandaparalympic.org

in Paris, France August 28, 2024 – September 8, 2024
- Competitors: 4 (2 men and 2 women) in 3 sports
- Flag bearers: Dennis Mbaziira; Peace Oroma
- Medals: Gold 0 Silver 0 Bronze 0 Total 0

Summer Paralympics appearances (overview)
- 1972; 1976; 1980–1992; 1996; 2000; 2004; 2008; 2012; 2016; 2020; 2024

Uganda competed at the 2024 Summer Paralympics in Paris, France, from 28 August to 8 September 2024.

== Competitors ==
The following is the list of number of competitors in the Games, including game-eligible alternates in team sports.

Sport	Men	Women	Total
Athletics	1	1	2
Powerlifting	1	0	1
Swimming	0	1	1
Total	2	2	4

== Athletics ==
Key

- Note–Ranks given for track events are within the athlete's heat only
- Q = Qualified for the next round
- q = Qualified for the next round as a fastest loser or, in field events, by position without achieving the qualifying target
- DQ = Disqualified
- PR = Paralympic Record
- AR = Area (or continental) Record
- NR = National Record
- SB = Season's Best
- N/A = Round not applicable for the event
- Bye = Athlete not required to compete in round

Track & road events

Athlete	Event	Heat		Final	
Athlete	Event	Result	Rank	Result	Rank
David Emong	Men's 1500 m T46	—		4:01.48	8
Peace Oroma	Women's 400 m T13	1:01.68	6	Did not advance	
Peace Oroma	Women's 1500 m T13	—		4:38.60	6

== Powerlifting ==
Athlete	Event	Attempts (kg)				Result (kg)	Rank
Athlete	Event	1	2	3	4	Result (kg)	Rank
Dennis Mbaziira	Men's –88 kg	180	186	~~188~~	—	186	9

== Swimming ==
Athlete	Event	Heat		Final	
Athlete	Event	Result	Rank	Result	Rank
Husnah Kukundakwe	Women's 50 m freestyle S8	33.12	9	Did not advance	
Husnah Kukundakwe	Women's 100 m breaststroke SB8	1:30.08	12	Did not advance	
Husnah Kukundakwe	Women's 100 m butterfly S8	1:25.29	11	Did not advance	

== See also ==
- Uganda at the 2024 Summer Olympics
- Uganda at the Paralympics
