= Uganda at the 1972 Summer Paralympics =

Paralympics in Heidelberg, West Germany

- IPC code: UGA
- NPC: Uganda National Paralympic Committee

in Heidelberg
- Competitors: 2 in 1 sport
- Medals: Gold 0 Silver 0 Bronze 0 Total 0

Summer Paralympics appearances (overview)
- 1972; 1976; 1980–1992; 1996; 2000; 2004; 2008; 2012; 2016; 2020; 2024

Uganda made its Paralympic Games début at the 1972 Summer Paralympics in Heidelberg, West Germany - shortly after Idi Amin's rise to power. Uganda sent two athletes to compete in javelin and shot put. This marked the start of Uganda's Paralympic journey, with subsequent appearances in 1976, before returning in 1996 and participating in every Summer Paralympics since.

== Background ==
Uganda made their Paralympic debut at the 1972 Summer Paralympics in Heidelberg, West Germany.

== Team ==
Uganda sent a two sportspeople strong delegation to the Games.

== Athletics ==
The country entered only two athletes, who both competed in men's javelin and shot put. Neither of them won a medal.

== See also ==
- Uganda at the 1972 Summer Olympics
- Uganda at the 2016 Summer Paralympics
- Uganda at the Paralympics
