= Uganda at the 1996 Summer Paralympics =

- IPC code: UGA
- NPC: Uganda National Paralympic Committee

in Atlanta
- Competitors: 1 in 1 sport
- Medals: Gold 0 Silver 0 Bronze 0 Total 0

Summer Paralympics appearances (overview)
- 1972; 1976; 1980–1992; 1996; 2000; 2004; 2008; 2012; 2016; 2020; 2024

Uganda sent a delegation to compete at the 1996 Summer Paralympics in Atlanta, United States. The country thus made its return to the Summer Paralympic Games after a twenty-year absence. It entered only one athlete, who competed in powerlifting. He did not win a medal.

== Powerlifting ==
Richard Bogere, Uganda's only representative, competed in the 67.5 kg event. He finished 21st (last of those who completed the event), with a lifted weight of 110 kg.

== See also ==
- Uganda at the 1996 Summer Olympics
