= Bulgaria at the 1992 Summer Paralympics =

- IPC code: BUL
- NPC: Bulgarian Paralympic Association

in Barcelona
- Competitors: 7
- Medals Ranked 42nd: Gold 1 Silver 2 Bronze 0 Total 3

Summer Paralympics appearances (overview)
- 1988; 1992; 1996; 2000; 2004; 2008; 2012; 2016; 2020; 2024

Bulgaria competed at the 1992 Summer Paralympics in Barcelona, Spain. 7 competitors from Bulgaria won 3 medals made up of 1 gold and 2 silver and finished joint 38th in the medal table along with Panama.

== See also ==
- Bulgaria at the Paralympics
- Bulgaria at the 1992 Summer Olympics
