= Bulgaria at the 1996 Summer Paralympics =

- IPC code: BUL
- NPC: Bulgarian Paralympic Association

in Atlanta
- Competitors: 6 (4 men and 2 women)
- Medals Ranked 55th: Gold 0 Silver 1 Bronze 1 Total 2

Summer Paralympics appearances (overview)
- 1988; 1992; 1996; 2000; 2004; 2008; 2012; 2016; 2020; 2024

Six athletes (four men and two women) from Bulgaria competed at the 1996 Summer Paralympics in Atlanta, United States.

== Medallists ==
Medal	Name	Sport	Event
Silver	Polina Dzhurova	Swimming	Women's 100m backstroke S6
Bronze	Gueorgui Sakelarov	Athletics	Men's discus F11

== See also ==
- Bulgaria at the Paralympics
- Bulgaria at the 1996 Summer Olympics
