= Bulgaria at the 2020 Summer Paralympics =

- IPC code: BUL
- NPC: Bulgarian Paralympic Association

in Tokyo
- Competitors: 4 in 2 sports
- Medals: Gold 0 Silver 2 Bronze 0 Total 2

Summer Paralympics appearances (overview)
- 1988; 1992; 1996; 2000; 2004; 2008; 2012; 2016; 2020; 2024

Bulgaria competed at the 2020 Summer Paralympics in Tokyo, Japan, from 24 August to 5 September 2021.

== Medalists ==
Medal	Name	Sport	Event	Date
Silver	Ruzhdi Ruzhdi	Athletics	Men's shot put F55	27 August
Silver	Hristiyan Stoyanov	Athletics	Men's 1500 metres T46	28 August

== Athletics ==
Two Bulgarian male athletes, Hristiyan Stoyanov (1500m T46) & Ruzhdi Ruzhdi (Shot Put F55), successfully to break through the qualifications for the 2020 Paralympics after breaking the qualification limit.

Men's track

Athlete	Event	Heats		Final	
Athlete	Event	Result	Rank	Result	Rank
Hristiyan Stoyanov	1500m T46	—		3:52.63	2nd place, silver medalist(s)

Men's field

Athlete	Event	Result	Rank
Ruzhdi Ruzhdi	Shot put F55	12.23	2nd place, silver medalist(s)

Women's field

Athlete	Event	Result	Rank
Fatme Ismail	Javelin throw F13	26.84	8

== Shooting ==
Bulgaria entered one athlete into the Paralympic competition. Milena Todorova successfully break the Paralympic qualification at the 2018 WSPS World Championships which was held in Cheongju, South Korea.

Athlete	Event	Qualification		Final	
Athlete	Event	Score	Rank	Score	Rank
Milena Todorova	Mixed R4 – 10 m air rifle standing SH2	625.5	15	did not advance	
Milena Todorova	Mixed R5 – 10 m air rifle prone SH2	629.8	29	did not advance	
