= Burundi at the 2008 Summer Paralympics =

- IPC code: BDI
- NPC: Comité National Olympique du Burundi

in Beijing
- Competitors: 3 in 1 sport
- Flag bearers: Remy Nikobimeze (opening & closing)
- Medals: Gold 0 Silver 0 Bronze 0 Total 0

Summer Paralympics appearances (overview)
- 1960; 1964; 1968; 1972; 1976; 1980; 1984; 1988; 1992; 1996; 2000; 2004; 2008; 2012; 2016; 2020; 2024

Burundi sent a delegation to compete at the 2008 Summer Paralympics in Beijing, People's Republic of China. It was Burundi's first ever participation in the Paralympic Games. According to official records, the following three athletes competed in the games:

== Athletics ==
3 competitors:

Men

Athlete	Class	Event	Heats		Semifinal		Final		
Athlete	Class	Event	Result	Rank	Result	Rank	Result	Points	Rank
Leonidas Ahishakiye	T46	1500 m	4:16.78	11	did not advance				
Fidele Manirambona	T46	1500 m	4:16.54	10	did not advance				
Remy Nikobimeze	T46	5000 m	N/A				15:07.95	-	5

== See also ==
- Burundi at the Paralympics
- Burundi at the 2008 Summer Olympics
