= Madagascar at the 2000 Summer Paralympics =

- IPC code: MAD
- NPC: Federation Malgache Handisport

in Sydney
- Competitors: 1 in 1 sport
- Medals: Gold 0 Silver 0 Bronze 0 Total 0

Summer Paralympics appearances (overview)
- 2000; 2004; 2008; 2012; 2016; 2020; 2024

Madagascar made its Paralympic Games début at the 2000 Summer Paralympics in Sydney. They were represented by vision impaired runner Aina Onja, who finished third in his men's T11 100m heat and failed to qualify for the next round.

== Team ==
Madagascar competed in its first Paralympic Games in Sydney. It sent a single athlete, blind runner Aina Onja, to compete in athletics. The country then missed the 2004 Games in Athens.

== Results ==
Agboessi ran in the first heat of his event, against Julio Requena of Spain and Edouard Agboessi of Benin, with Cuba's Jorge Jay Masso being a non-starter. Onja's time of 13.98 was the slowest of all the heats, ending his participation in the Games.

Name	Sport	Event	Time	Rank
Aina Onja	Athletics	Men's 100 m T11	13.98	3rd in heat 1; did not advance

== See also ==
- Madagascar at the Paralympics
- Madagascar at the 2000 Summer Olympics
