= 2021 World Para Athletics European Championships – Men's 1500 metres =

The men's 1500 metres events were held at the 2021 World Para Athletics European Championships in Bydgoszcz, Poland.

== Medalists ==
Event	Gold		Silver		Bronze	
T11	Fedor Rudakov (RUS); Guide: Vladimir Miasnikov	4:09.71 CR	Aleksander Kossakowski (POL); Guide: Krzysztof Wasilewski	4:09.88	Hasan Hüseyin Kaçar (TUR); Guide: Umut Kurkcu	4:15.39 SB
T13	Anton Kuliatin (RUS)	3:46.97 ER	Egor Sharov (RUS)	3:49.72 ER	Yassine Ouhdadi El Ataby (ESP)	3:50.79 PB
T20	Aleksandr Rabotnitskii (RUS)	3:54.36 ER	Pavel Sarkeev (RUS)	3:57.14 SB	Ndiaga Dieng (ITA)	3:57.18
T38	Redouane Hennouni-Bouzidi (FRA)	4:04.39 ER	Michael McKillop (IRL)	4:09.85 CR	Renaud Clerc (FRA)	4:19.03
T46	Aleksandr Iaremchuk (RUS)	3:51.91 CR	Hristiyan Stoyanov (BUL)	3:52.33	Luke Nuttall (GBR)	3:55.25 PB
T52	Thomas Geierspichler (AUT)	4:18.14	Kestutis Skucas (LTU)	4:19.12	Fabian Blum (SUI)	4:19.41 PB
T54	Marcel Hug (SUI)	3:00.37 CR	Daniel Sidbury (GBR)	3:05.30	Aleksei Bychenok (RUS)	3:05.38

== See also ==
- List of IPC world records in athletics
