= Olesya Lafina =

Russian Paralympic powerlifter

Personal information
- Native name: Олеся Лафина
- Nationality: Russian

Sport
- Sport: Paralympic powerlifting

Achievements and titles
- Olympic finals: 2012 Summer Paralympics
Medal record
Representing Russia
Paralympic Games
Silver medal – second place	2008 Beijing	Women's 48kg
Silver medal – second place	2012 London	Women's 48kg
IPC Powerlifting World Championships
Gold medal – first place	2014 IPC Powerlifting World Championships	women's powerlifting

Olesya Lafina (Russian: Оле́ся Лафина) is a 34-year-old Russian Paralympic powerlifter who won the 2014 IPC Powerlifting World Championships which were held in Dubai on 7 April 2014. There, she competed against Lidiia Soloviova of Ukraine and Gihan Abdelaziz of Egypt who won silver and bronze respectively. In 2012 she won silver medal at the 2012 London Paralympic games in 50 kilograms (110 lb), 117 kilograms (258 lb) and 122 kilograms (269 lb) weightlifting and in 2013 won the European title. On May 23 she won a gold medal in Aleksin, Russia for her participation in the IPC Powerlifting Open European Championships.
