= Prossy Tusabe =

Ugandan swimmer

Prossy Tusabe is a Ugandan swimmer.

Her home was bombed when she was a baby, resulting in the deaths of her father and brothers, and in her legs being maimed. Her father had been an opponent to the government of Idi Amin.

Prossy Tusabe was selected as the sole member of Uganda's delegation to the 2000 Summer Paralympics in Sydney. She competed in the women's 100m freestyle (S10 category). She finished last in her heat, her time of 2:12.45 far behind that of the second slowest overall (the United States's Karen Noris, in 1:09.37). Thus she did not advance to the final.

While in Australia, she applied for refugee status, and obtained it six years later.
