= Athletics at the 2020 Summer Paralympics – Men's 1500 metres T46 =

Men's 1500 metres T46 at the XVI Paralympic Games
- Venue: Tokyo National Stadium
- Dates: 28 August 2021 (final)
- Competitors: 12 from 12 nations
- Winning time: 3:52.08

Medalists
1st place, gold medalist(s)		Aleksandr Iaremchuk	RPC
2nd place, silver medalist(s)		Hristiyan Stoyanov	Bulgaria
3rd place, bronze medalist(s)		David Emong	Uganda

The men's 1500 metres T46 event at the 2020 Summer Paralympics in Tokyo took place on 28 August 2021.

The T46 category is for athletes who have a single above or below elbow amputation or similar disability, with normal function in both legs.

== Records ==
Prior to the competition, the existing records were as follows:

World Record	Michael Roeger (AUS)	3:46.51	Sydney, Australia	4 February 2017
Paralympic Record	Abraham Cheruiyot Tarbei (KEN)	3:50.15	London, United Kingdom	4 September 2012

Area	Time	Athlete	Nation
Africa	3:50.15 PR	Abraham Cheruiyot Tarbei	Kenya
America	3:54.43	Alex Pires da Silva	Brazil
Asia	3:58.23	Qin Ning	China
Europe	3:50.87	Hristiyan Stoyanov	Bulgaria
Oceania	3:46.51 WR	Michael Roeger	Australia

== Results ==
=== Final ===
The final took place on 28 August 2021, at 10:28:

Rank	Athlete	Nation	Time	Notes
1st place, gold medalist(s)	Aleksandr Iaremchuk	RPC	3:52.08	
2nd place, silver medalist(s)	Hristiyan Stoyanov	Bulgaria	3:52.63	
3rd place, bronze medalist(s)	David Emong	Uganda	3:53.51	PB
4	Samir Nouioua	Algeria	3:55.56	SB
5	Gemechu Amenu Dinsa	Ethiopia	3:56.04	PB
6	Felix Kipruto	Kenya	3:59.98	PB
7	Christian Lykkeby Olsen	Denmark	4:00.16	PB
8	Hermas Muvunyi	Rwanda	4:00.46	PB
9	Luke Nuttall	Great Britain	4:02.65	
10	Remy Nikobimeze	Burundi	4:05.44	SB
11	Manuel Ernestro Jaime	Angola	4:09.79	SB
12	Li Chaoyan	China	4:11.63	SB
