= Uganda at the 1976 Summer Paralympics =

- IPC code: UGA
- NPC: Uganda National Paralympic Committee

in Toronto
- Competitors: 1 in 1 sport
- Medals Ranked 34th: Gold 0 Silver 0 Bronze 0 Total 0

Summer Paralympics appearances (overview)
- 1972; 1976; 1980–1992; 1996; 2000; 2004; 2008; 2012; 2016; 2020; 2024

Uganda sent a delegation to compete at the 1976 Summer Paralympics in Toronto, Ontario, Canada. The country entered only one athlete, who competed in athletics. He did not win a medal.

Uganda competed in the Paralympics, but not in the 1976 Summer Olympics, as it took part in the African boycott of that year's Summer Games.

It was to be Uganda's last appearance at the Summer Paralympics before 1996.

== Athletics ==
O. Obadiya (full name not recorded) was Uganda's only representative, and competed in the men's javelin throw (C category). He finished 15th out of 23, with a throw of 32.18m.

== See also ==
- Uganda at the 1972 Summer Paralympics
- Uganda at the 2001 Summer Olympics
