= Armenia at the 2014 Winter Paralympics =

- The flag of Armenia
- IPC code: ARM
- NPC: Armenian National Paralympic Committee

in Sochi
- Competitors: 1 (man) in 1 sport
- Flag bearer: Mher Avanesyan
- Medals: Gold 0 Silver 0 Bronze 0 Total 0

Winter Paralympics appearances (overview)
- 1998; 2002; 2006; 2010; 2014; 2018; 2022; 2026

Other related appearances
- Soviet Union (1988); Unified Team (1992)

Armenia sent a delegation to compete at the 2014 Winter Paralympics in Sochi, Russia from 7–16 March 2014. This was the nation's fifth appearance at a Winter Paralympic Games. The delegation consisted of a single alpine skier, Mher Avanesyan, who lost both arms as a child after coming into contact with a high-voltage electrical wire. In the men's standing slalom he came in 34th place out of 35 competitors who finished the race, and he failed to finish the giant slalom.

== Background ==
Armenia first entered Paralympic competition at the 1996 Summer Paralympics, and Winter Paralympic competition at the 1998 Winter Paralympics. They have entered every Paralympics since, making Sochi their fifth Winter Paralympics appearance. As of 2018, Armenia has never won a Paralympic medal, though the nation has won several medals at the Olympic Games. The 2014 Winter Paralympics were held from 7–16 March 2014, in Sochi, Russia; 45 countries and 547 athletes took part in the multi-sport event. The Armenian delegation to Sochi consisted of a single alpine skier, Mher Avanesyan. He was chosen as the Armenian flag-bearer for the parade of nations during the opening ceremony and the closing ceremony.

== Disability classification ==
Every participant at the Paralympics has their disability grouped into one of five disability categories: amputation, the condition may be congenital or sustained through injury or illness; cerebral palsy; wheelchair athletes, though there is often overlap between this and other categories; visual impairment, including blindness; and Les Autres, any physical disability that does not fall strictly under one of the other categories, like dwarfism or multiple sclerosis. Each Paralympic sport then has its own classifications, dependent upon the specific physical demands of competition. Events are given a code, made of numbers and letters, describing the type of event and classification of the athletes competing. Events with "B" in the code are for athletes with visual impairment, codes LW1 to LW9 are for athletes who stand to compete and LW10 to LW12 are for athletes who compete sitting down. Alpine skiing events grouped athletes into separate competitions for sitting, standing and visually impaired athletes.

== Alpine skiing ==
Mher Avanesyan was 33 years old at the time of the Sochi Paralympics. He had previously represented Armenia in sailing at the 2000 Summer Paralympics, and the 1998, 2006, and 2010 Winter Paralympics. He lost both arms at the age of 7 after touching high-voltage wires, and is classified as LW5/7-1, meaning he competes in a standing position. LW5/7 is defined in International Paralympic Committee website as "Athletes in this sport class ski with an impairment in both arms. Some athletes have amputations and others have limited muscle power or coordination problems." On 13 March, he participated in the men's standing slalom, posting a first run time of 1 minute and 12.01 seconds, and finishing the second run in 1 minute and 18.33 seconds. His total time, determined by adding the two run times, was 2 minutes and 30.34 seconds, which ranked him 34th out of 35 classified finishers, the gold medal was won by Alexey Bugaev of Russia in a time of 1 minute and 38.97 seconds. The silver medal was won by Vincent Gauthier-Manuel of France, and the bronze by Alexander Alyabyev also of Russia. Two days later, in the men's standing giant slalom, Avanesyan failed to finish the first leg, after missing a gate approximately 55 seconds into his run. In the giant slalom, gold was won by Gauthier-Manuel and silver by Bugaev; bronze was won by Markus Salcher of Austria.

| Athlete | Event | Run 1 | | | Run 2 | | | Final/Total | | |
| Athlete | Event | Time | Diff | Rank | Time | Diff | Rank | Time | Diff | Rank |
|---|---|---|---|---|---|---|---|---|---|---|
| Mher Avanesyan | Slalom, standing | 1:12.01 | +24.32 | 40 | 1:18.33 | +27.05 | 33 | 2:30.34 | +51.37 | 34 |
| Mher Avanesyan | Giant slalom, standing | DNF | | | Did Not Advance | | | | | |

== See also ==
- Armenia at the Paralympics
- Armenia at the 2014 Winter Olympics
