= Uganda at the 2004 Summer Paralympics =

- IPC code: UGA
- NPC: Uganda National Paralympic Committee

in Athens
- Competitors: 2 in 2 sports
- Flag bearer: Billy Ssengendo
- Medals: Gold 0 Silver 0 Bronze 0 Total 0

Summer Paralympics appearances (overview)
- 1972; 1976; 1980–1992; 1996; 2000; 2004; 2008; 2012; 2016; 2020; 2024

Uganda competed at the 2004 Summer Paralympics in Athens, Greece. The team included two athletes, one man and one woman, neither of whom won a medal.

== Sports ==
=== Athletics ===
==== Women's track ====
Athlete	Class	Event	Heats		Semifinal		Final	
Athlete	Class	Event	Result	Rank	Result	Rank	Result	Rank
Irene Acen	T12	100m	15.68	16	did not advance			
Irene Acen	T12	200m	32.42	14	did not advance			

=== Powerlifting ===
Athlete	Event	Result	Rank
Billy Ssengendo	60kg	145.0	11

== See also ==
- Uganda at the Paralympics
- Uganda at the 2004 Summer Olympics
