= Armenia at the 2008 Summer Paralympics =

- IPC code: ARM
- NPC: Armenian National Paralympic Committee

in Beijing
- Competitors: 1 in 1 sport
- Flag bearer: Greta Khndzrtsyan
- Medals: Gold 0 Silver 0 Bronze 0 Total 0

Summer Paralympics appearances (overview)
- 1996; 2000; 2004; 2008; 2012; 2016; 2020; 2024

Other related appearances
- Soviet Union (1988); Unified Team (1992)

Armenia sent a delegation to compete at the 2008 Summer Paralympics in Beijing, People's Republic of China.

== Sports ==
=== Powerlifting ===
Athlete	Event	Result	Rank
Greta Khndzrtsyan	48kg	NMR	

== See also ==
- Armenia at the Paralympics
- Armenia at the 2008 Summer Olympics
