= Bulgaria at the 2000 Summer Paralympics =

- IPC code: BUL
- NPC: Bulgarian Paralympic Association

in Sydney
- Medals: Gold 1 Silver 0 Bronze 0 Total 1

Summer Paralympics appearances (overview)
- 1988; 1992; 1996; 2000; 2004; 2008; 2012; 2016; 2020; 2024

There were 1 female and 5 male athletes representing the country at the 2000 Summer Paralympics.

== Medals ==
Medals	Name	Sport	Event
1st place, gold medalist(s)	Ivanka Koleva	Athletics	Shot put - F57

== See also ==
- 2000 Summer Paralympics

== Bibliography ==
- International Paralympic Committee (2000). "Appendix C: Athlete Numbers - By Delegation". Sydney 2000 Paralympic Games Post Games Report. Sydney.
