= Madagascar at the 2008 Summer Paralympics =

- IPC code: MAD
- NPC: Federation Malgache Handisport

in Beijing
- Competitors: 1 in 1 sport
- Flag bearer: Josefa Harijaona Randrianony
- Medals: Gold 0 Silver 0 Bronze 0 Total 0

Summer Paralympics appearances (overview)
- 2000; 2004; 2008; 2012; 2016; 2020; 2024

Madagascar competed at the 2008 Summer Paralympics in Beijing, China.

== Swimming ==
Athlete	Class	Event	Heats		Final	
Athlete	Class	Event	Result	Rank	Result	Rank
Josefa Harijaona Randrianony	S9	50m freestyle	38.06	22	did not advance	

== See also ==
- Madagascar at the Paralympics
- Madagascar at the 2008 Summer Olympics
