= Bulgaria at the 2012 Summer Paralympics =

- IPC code: BUL
- NPC: Bulgarian Paralympic Association

in London
- Competitors: 8 in 2 sports
- Medals Ranked 59th: Gold 0 Silver 2 Bronze 1 Total 3

Summer Paralympics appearances (overview)
- 1988; 1992; 1996; 2000; 2004; 2008; 2012; 2016; 2020; 2024

Bulgaria competed at the 2012 Summer Paralympics in London, United Kingdom from August 29 to September 9, 2012.

== Medallists ==
Medal	Name	Sport	Event	Date
Silver	Stela Eneva	Athletics	Women's Discus Throw F57-58	4 September
Silver	Stela Eneva	Athletics	Women's Shot Put F57-58	8 September
Bronze	Radoslav Zlatanov	Athletics	Men's long jump F13	1 September

== Athletics ==
Men’s Track and Road Events

Athlete	Event	Heat		Final	
Athlete	Event	Result	Rank	Result	Rank
Radoslav Zlatanov	100m T13	11.10	2 Q	11.25	6
Radoslav Zlatanov	200m T13	DNS		Did not advance	

Men’s Field Events

Athlete	Event	Distance	Points	Rank
Dechko Ovcharov	Discus Throw F42	NM		
Dechko Ovcharov	Javelin Throw F42	43.69	—N/a	8
Ruzhdi Ruzhdi	Shot Put F54-56	9.78	849	15
Ruzhdi Ruzhdi	Discus Throw F54-56	30.47	786	11
Ruzhdi Ruzhdi	Javelin Throw F54-56	NM		
Mustafa Yuseinov	Shot Put F54-56	9.57	827	16
Mustafa Yuseinov	Discus Throw F54-56	32.56	849	8
Mustafa Yuseinov	Javelin Throw F54-56	25.85	—N/a	9
Radoslav Zlatanov	Long Jump F13	6.81	—N/a	3rd place, bronze medalist(s)

Women’s Field Events

Athlete	Event	Distance	Points	Rank
Stela Eneva	Shot Put F57-58	11.38	1012	2nd place, silver medalist(s)
Stela Eneva	Discus Throw F57-58	36.56	926	2nd place, silver medalist(s)
Ivanka Koleva	Shot Put F57-58	9.10	845	9
Ivanka Koleva	Discus Throw F57-58	23.15	720	8
Ivanka Koleva	Javelin Throw F57-58	14.73	501	16
Daniela Todorova	Shot Put F54-56	6.83	719	13
Daniela Todorova	Javelin Throw F54-56	19.25	—N/a	6

== Judo ==
Athlete	Event	Quarterfinals	Semifinals	Repechage Semifinals	Final	
Athlete	Event	Opposition Result	Opposition Result	Opposition Result	Opposition Result	Rank
Ivomira Mihaylova	Women’s +70kg	Akin (TUR); L 0004–103	Did not advance	Kalyanova (RUS); L 0001–100	Did not advance	

== See also ==
- Bulgaria at the 2012 Summer Olympics
