= Uganda at the 2016 Summer Paralympics =

- IPC code: UGA
- NPC: Uganda National Paralympic Committee

in Rio de Janeiro
- Competitors: 1 in 1 sports
- Flag bearer: David Emong
- Medals Ranked 69th: Gold 0 Silver 1 Bronze 0 Total 1

Summer Paralympics appearances (overview)
- 1972; 1976; 1980–1992; 1996; 2000; 2004; 2008; 2012; 2016; 2020; 2024

Uganda sent a delegation to compete at the 2016 Summer Paralympics in Rio de Janeiro, Brazil, from 7 to 18 September 2016. This was the eighth appearance of the country in the Summer Paralympic Games after it debuted forty-four years prior at the 1972 Heidelberg Paralympics. Athletics track runner David Emong was the sole athlete representing Uganda in Rio de Janeiro. He took part in the men's 400 metres T45–47 competition on 8 September and did not qualify for the finals because he was fifteenth overall. Emong participated in the men's 1500 metres T45–46 event later that day and he took Uganda's first medal in Paralympic competition by coming second in the final.

== Background ==
Uganda made its Paralympic debut at the 1972 Summer Paralympics in Heidelberg, West Germany. After competing at the 1976 Toronto Paralympics, they were absent from the Summer Paralympics until the 1996 Atlanta Games, and have taken part in every Summer Paralympic Games since. These Rio de Janeiro Games were the nation's eighth appearance at a Summer Paralympiad. Uganda had not won its first Paralympic medal before the Rio de Janeiro edition. The 2016 Summer Paralympics were held from 7–18 September 2016 with a total of 4,328 athletes representing 159 National Paralympic Committees taking part. Athletics track runner David Emong was the only competitor for Uganda in Rio de Janeiro. Three other athletes, Christine Akullo, Emmanuel Vukoja and Bashir Bwanga, failed to make the team due to them missing their final qualifying meets. Emong was chosen as the flag bearer for the parade of nations during the opening ceremony.

== Medallists ==
Uganda finished tied for ninth among African countries for the total number of medals won and sixty-ninth overall, winning one silver. Ethiopia and the Ivory Coast also won a single silver medal.

Medal	Name	Sport	Event	Date
Silver	David Emong	Athletics	Men's 1500 m T45-46	16 September

== Disability classification ==
Every participant at the Paralympics has their disability grouped into one of five disability categories; amputation, the condition may be congenital or sustained through injury or illness; cerebral palsy; wheelchair athletes, there is often overlap between this and other categories; visual impairment, including blindness; Les autres, any physical disability that does not fall strictly under one of the other categories, for example dwarfism or multiple sclerosis. Each Paralympic sport then has its own classifications, dependent upon the specific physical demands of competition. Events are given a code, made of numbers and letters, describing the type of event and classification of the athletes competing. Some sports, such as athletics, divide athletes by both the category and severity of their disabilities, other sports, for example swimming, group competitors from different categories together, the only separation being based on the severity of the disability.

== Athletics ==
A veteran of the 2012 Summer Paralympics and a silver medalist in the 1500 metres T46 at the 2015 African Games, David Emong was 26 years old at the time of the Rio Paralympic Games. His left arm was broken at the shoulder point after his fellow students beat him in primary school in 2005 and he did not receive medical treatment which resulted in the limited usage of the limb. Emong is classified as T46 by the International Paralympic Committee. He qualified for the Games by using a wild card because he could not attend the final qualifying meet in Qatar. Emong partook in the men's 400 metres T45–47 event on 8 September and was assigned to heat three. He finished the race in 58.30 seconds and was fifth and last out of all the finishing runners in his heat. Only the top eight in all three heats progressed to the finals, and Emong was eliminated because he was fifteenth overall. (Note: Three athletes did not start the heats.) Later that day, he took part in the men's 1500 metres T45–46 competition and competed directly in the final because no heats were scheduled. Emong ran in the fourth lane and overtook Michael Roeger of Australia with 37 seconds to go and claimed second with a time of four minutes and 00.62 seconds. This earned him the silver medal and Uganda's first medal in Paralympic competition. Emong was praised by public figures in Uganda for his achievement, and he spoke of his ambition to inspire young people with disabilities in the country to take up athletics.

=== Men's Track ===
Athlete	Events	Heats		Final	
Athlete	Events	Time	Rank	Time	Rank
David Emong	400 m T45-47	58.30	5	did not advance	
David Emong	1500 m T45-46	—N/a		4:00.62	(silver)

== See also ==
- Uganda at the 2016 Summer Olympics
