= Armenia at the 2006 Winter Paralympics =

- IPC code: ARM
- NPC: Armenian National Paralympic Committee

in Turin
- Competitors: 3 in 1 sport
- Medals Ranked 20th: Gold 0 Silver 0 Bronze 0 Total 0

Winter Paralympics appearances (overview)
- 1998; 2002; 2006; 2010; 2014; 2018; 2022; 2026

Other related appearances
- Soviet Union (1988); Unified Team (1992)

Armenia participated in the ninth Winter Paralympics in Turin, Italy. The country sent three representatives to the Games.

== Medalists ==
	(gold)	(silver)	(bronze)	Total
Armenia	0	0	0	0

== Events ==
=== Alpine skiing ===
- men: Mher Avanesyan, Garush Danielyan
- women: Greta Khndzrtsyan

== See also ==
- 2006 Winter Paralympics
- Armenia at the 2006 Winter Olympics
