= Burundi at the 2012 Summer Paralympics =

- IPC code: BDI
- NPC: Comité National Olympique du Burundi

in London
- Competitors: 1 in 1 sport
- Flag bearer: Remy Nikobimeze
- Medals: Gold 0 Silver 0 Bronze 0 Total 0

Summer Paralympics appearances (overview)
- 1960; 1964; 1968; 1972; 1976; 1980; 1984; 1988; 1992; 1996; 2000; 2004; 2008; 2012; 2016; 2020; 2024

Burundi competed at the 2012 Summer Paralympics in London, United Kingdom from August 29 to September 9.

A single athlete, middle-distance runner Rémy Nikobimeze, who lost his right arm during the Burundi Civil War, qualified for the Games. He received financial support from the Pays de la Loire region in France, and was one of five Burundian athletes selected by former world vice-champion Arthémon Hatungimana to take part in qualifiers. He competed in the men's 800m and 1,500m T46.

== Athletics ==
Men's track

Athlete	Event	Heat		Final	
Athlete	Event	Result	Rank	Result	Rank
Remy Nikobimeze	800m T46	2:00.25	6	Did not advance	
Remy Nikobimeze	1500m T46	4:10.70	6	Did not advance	

== See also ==
- Burundi at the Paralympics
- Burundi at the 2012 Summer Olympics
