= Burundi at the 2020 Summer Paralympics =

- Flag of Burundi
- IPC code: BDI
- NPC: National Paralympic Committee Botswana

in Tokyo, Japan August 24, 2021 – September 5, 2021
- Competitors: 2 (1 man and 1 woman) in 1 sport
- Medals: Gold 0 Silver 0 Bronze 0 Total 0

Summer Paralympics appearances (overview)
- 1960; 1964; 1968; 1972; 1976; 1980; 1984; 1988; 1992; 1996; 2000; 2004; 2008; 2012; 2016; 2020; 2024

Burundi competed at the 2020 Summer Paralympics in Tokyo, Japan, from 24 August to 5 September 2021. This was their fourth consecutive appearance at the Summer Paralympics since 2008.

== Competitors ==
The following is the list of number of competitors participating in the Games:

Sport	Men	Women	Total
Athletics	1	1	2

== Athletics ==
Men's track

Athlete	Event	Final	
Athlete	Event	Result	Rank
Rémy Nikobimeze	1500m T46	4:05.44	10

Women's track

Athlete	Event	Heats		Final	
Athlete	Event	Result	Rank	Result	Rank
Adéline Mushiranzigo	400m T47	1.16.84	6	did not advance	N/A

== See also ==
- Burundi at the Paralympics
- Burundi at the 2020 Summer Olympics
