= Powerlifting at the 2012 Summer Paralympics – Women's 48 kg =

Powerlifting – Women's 48 kg at the XIV Paralympic Games
- Venue: ExCeL London
- Date: 1 September 2012
- Competitors: 8 from 8 nations
- Winning lift: 135 kg

Medalists
1st place, gold medalist(s)		Esther Oyema	Nigeria
2nd place, silver medalist(s)		Olesya Lafina	Russia
3rd place, bronze medalist(s)		Shi Shanshan	China

The women's 48 kg powerlifting event at the 2012 Summer Paralympics was contested on 1 September at ExCeL London.

== Records ==
Prior to the competition, the existing world and Paralympic records were as follows.

World record	130.0 kg	Lucy Ejike (NGR)	Beijing, China	10 September 2008
Paralympic record	130.0 kg	Lucy Ejike (NGR)	Beijing, China	10 September 2008

== Results ==
Rank	Name	Body weight (kg)	Attempts (kg)				Result (kg)
Rank	Name	Body weight (kg)	1	2	3	4	Result (kg)
1st place, gold medalist(s)	Esther Oyema (NGR)	47.05	130.0	132.0	135.0	~~140.0~~	135.0 WR
2nd place, silver medalist(s)	Olesya Lafina (RUS)	47.10	115.0	117.0	120.0	–	120.0
3rd place, bronze medalist(s)	Shi Shanshan (CHN)	47.60	110.0	~~113.0~~	114.0	–	114.0
4	Yasemin Ceylan (TUR)	47.78	111.0	114.0	~~115.0~~	–	114.0
5	Loida Zabala Ollero (ESP)	47.62	95.0	98.0	~~100.0~~	–	98.0
6	Rayisa Toporkova (UKR)	47.41	95.0	~~98.0~~	~~98.0~~	–	95.0
7	Greta Vardanyan (ARM)	44.23	77.0	82.0	~~84.0~~	–	82.0
-	Jeong Hee Shin (KOR)	47.27	~~68.0~~	~~68.0~~	~~68.0~~	–	NMR
