= Armenia at the 2010 Winter Paralympics =

- IPC code: ARM
- NPC: Armenian National Paralympic Committee

in Vancouver
- Competitors: 2 in 1 sport
- Flag bearer: Gayane Usnyan
- Medals: Gold 0 Silver 0 Bronze 0 Total 0

Winter Paralympics appearances (overview)
- 1998; 2002; 2006; 2010; 2014; 2018; 2022; 2026

Other related appearances
- Soviet Union (1988); Unified Team (1992)

Armenia's delegation to compete at the 2010 Winter Paralympics, in Vancouver fielded a total of two athletes, both in alpine skiing.

== Alpine skiing ==
The following two athletes represented Armenia in alpine skiing:

Athlete	Event	Final			
Athlete	Event	Run 1	Run 2	Total Time	Rank
Mher Avanesyan	Men's slalom standing	1:09.74	1:09.79	2:19.53	36
Mher Avanesyan	Men's giant slalom standing	DNF	did not advance		-
Gayane Usnyan	Women's giant slalom standing	DSQ	did not advance		-

== See also ==
- Armenia at the 2010 Winter Olympics
- Armenia at the Paralympics
