= Armenian National Disabled Sports Federation =

Sports organization of Armenia

Armenian National Disabled Sports Federation logo

The Armenian National Disabled Sports Federation (Armenian: Հայաստանի հաշմանդամային սպորտի ազգային ֆեդերացիա), is the organizing body of sports in Armenia for athletes with physical disabilities or intellectual impairments, governed by the Armenian Paralympic Committee. The headquarters of the federation is located in Yerevan.

== History ==
The Armenian National Disabled Sports Federation was established in 2009 and is currently led by president Sargys Stepanian. The Federation oversees the training of athletes with disabilities in various sporting fields and organizes Armenia's participation in European and international level competitions for disabled people. The Federation is a member of CPISRA.

== Activities ==
On 14 December 2014, former president of the Federation, Samvel Rostomyan, urged the Government of Armenia to increase state support to the development of sports for disabled people.

In July 2018, a special beach for disabled people was opened at Lake Sevan. The beach is adapted for wheelchairs and people with mobility problems. There are special ramps and water sports equipment. The beach area has all the conditions for people with disabilities to conduct water sports training and to prepare for the Summer Paralympic Games and European Championships. The Federation assisted to create the beach training area and supported the creation of a nearby summer camp, in which over 100 disabled athletes received training in sailing, canoeing, yachting, swimming and diving.

On 19 December 2019, members of the Federation met with Armenian president Armen Sarkissian, the president thanked the Federation for their dedication to organizing sporting events and congratulated several athletes for their achievements made in international competitions.

In 2020, the Federation held Armenia's first disabled arm-wrestling championship with support from the Ministry of Education.

In 2021, the Federation held the "Republican Sports Games for the Disabled" in coordination with the Armenian Triathlon Federation. The event was organized for wounded soldiers following the 2020 Nagorno-Karabakh war.

== See also ==
- Armenia at the Paralympics
- Sport in Armenia
