= Bulgaria at the 2010 Winter Paralympics =

- IPC code: BUL
- NPC: Bulgarian Paralympic Association

in Vancouver
- Competitors: 3 in 1 sport
- Flag bearer: Aleksandar Stoyanov
- Medals: Gold 0 Silver 0 Bronze 0 Total 0

Winter Paralympics appearances (overview)
- 1994; 1998; 2002; 2006; 2010; 2014; 2018; 2022; 2026

Bulgaria sent a delegation to compete at the 2010 Winter Paralympics, in Vancouver, British Columbia, Canada. It fielded a total of three athletes, all of whom competed in cross-country skiing. It did not win a medal.

== Cross-country skiing ==
The following three athletes represented Bulgaria in cross-country skiing:

Athlete	Event	Final		
Athlete	Event	Time	Difference	Rank
Yoana Ermenkova	Women's 1 km Sprint Classic - Visually Impaired	6:04.17	+2:06.70	11
Yoana Ermenkova	Women's 5 km Classic - Visually Impaired	27:58.4	+12:49.6	13
Aleksandar Stoyanov	Men's 1 km Sprint Classic - Visually Impaired	4:12.36	+47.57	20
Aleksandar Stoyanov	Men's 10 km Classic - Visually Impaired	36:27.3	+10:25.7	15
Ivaylo Vatov	Men's 1 km Sprint Classic - Visually Impaired	6:33.03	+3:18.24	21
Ivaylo Vatov	Men's 10 km Classic - Visually Impaired	Did not finish		

== See also ==
- Bulgaria at the 2010 Winter Olympics
- Bulgaria at the Paralympics
