= Bulgaria at the 2004 Summer Paralympics =

- IPC code: BUL
- NPC: Bulgarian Paralympic Association

in Athens
- Competitors: 9 in 3 sports
- Flag bearer: Hristo Gerganski
- Medals: Gold 0 Silver 0 Bronze 0 Total 0

Summer Paralympics appearances (overview)
- 1988; 1992; 1996; 2000; 2004; 2008; 2012; 2016; 2020; 2024

Bulgaria competed at the 2004 Summer Paralympics in Athens, Greece. The team included 10 athletes, 7 men and 3 women, but won no medals.

== Sports ==
=== Athletics ===
==== Men's track ====
Athlete	Class	Event	Heats		Semifinal		Final	
Athlete	Class	Event	Result	Rank	Result	Rank	Result	Rank
Hristo Gerganski	T42	100m	—N/a				15.50	7

==== Men's field ====
Athlete	Class	Event	Final		
Athlete	Class	Event	Result	Points	Rank
Donko Angelov	F13	Long jump	5.83	-	8
Hristo Gerganski	F42	High jump	1.50	-	6
Hristo Gerganski	F42	Long jump	4.58	-	5
Dechko Ovcharov	F42	Discus	33.09	-	9
Dechko Ovcharov	F42	Javelin	40.56	-	9
Dechko Ovcharov	F42	Shot put	10.71	-	8
Mustafa Yuseinov	F55	Discus	29.30	-	8
Mustafa Yuseinov	F56	Shot put	8.01	-	17

==== Women's field ====
Athlete	Class	Event	Final		
Athlete	Class	Event	Result	Points	Rank
Stela Eneva	F42-46	Discus	32.22	995	10
Stela Eneva	F42-46	Javelin	13.45	362	12
Stela Eneva	F42-46	Shot put	9.42	878	11
Ivanka Koleva	F56-58	Discus	22.83	965	9
Ivanka Koleva	F56-58	Javelin	16.43	795	11
Ivanka Koleva	F56-58	Shot put	8.79	1063	6

=== Powerlifting ===
Athlete	Event	Result	Rank
Anton Pouskov	67.5kg	135.0	10
Spas Spasov	75kg	150.0	14
Mustafa Yuseinov	+100kg	155.0	10

=== Swimming ===
Athlete	Class	Event	Heats		Final	
Athlete	Class	Event	Result	Rank	Result	Rank
Polina Dzhurova	S7	50m freestyle	43.11	16	did not advance	
Polina Dzhurova	S7	100m freestyle	1:37.22	16	did not advance	
Polina Dzhurova	S7	100m backstroke	1:43.43	10	did not advance	
Polina Dzhurova	SB7	100m breaststroke	2:05.36	10	did not advance	
Polina Dzhurova	SM7	200m individual medley	DSQ		did not advance	

== See also ==
- Bulgaria at the Paralympics
- Bulgaria at the 2004 Summer Olympics
