= Loida Zabala Ollero =

Spanish Paralympic powerlifter

Loida Zabala
Personal information
- Full name: Loida Zabala Ollero
- Nationality: Spanish
- Born: 5 April 1987 (age 39) Losar de la Vera, Cáceres, Spain

Sport
- Country: Spain
- Sport: Powerlifting

Loida Zabala Ollero (born 5 April 1987) is a Spanish disability powerlifter who has represented Spain at the 2008 and 2012 Summer Paralympics.

== Personal ==
Zabala was born in Losar de la Vera, Cáceres. The loss of use of her legs was very sudden, and occurred when she was eleven years old as a result of transverse myelitis. She got her drivers license when she was 18 years old. In 2012, she lived in Oviedo. She moved to Oviedo around Easter in 2007 in order to better train for her sport. She has studied Administration and Finance, and Computers. She has three cats named Alessia, Pug and Cefe. In 2011, she participated in the creation of a charity calendar for the Association to Protect Adopted Animals (Spanish: Asociación Protectora de Animales Adoptastur), an organization that has helped a number Spanish Sports Federation for Persons with Physical Disabilities of Asturias, sportspeople. In early 2012, she had viral infection that negatively impacted her physically.

== Powerlifting ==
Zabala got into weight training as a way of dealing with being tired all the time. She started more seriously after going to Toledo when she was 18 after someone told her about it and she met her future coach, Lodario Ramón. One day, she would like to become a powerlifting coach because she believes winning can come down to having the right technique. She has said she thinks she will retire from the sport when she is 35 or 40 years old.

In 2006, Zabala wanted to train with the best, and so she made contact with Lodario Ramón who then became her coach. She moved to be closer to him. In her first competition, she lifted 45 kilograms. Her first international competition was in Greece in 2006 where she picked up a gold medal. Competing at the 2007 Spanish National Championships, she won the event and set a national record. She would go on to win the national championships in 2008, 2009, 2010, 2011, 2012 and 2013. At the 2007 European Championships, she finished seventh. In 2008, she trained at the Sports Palace (Spanish: Palacio de los Deportes) where she was coached by Ramón. Competing at the 2008 Summer Paralympics, she finished in seventh. The Beijing Paralympics were her first, and, as a 21-year-old, she was the first woman to represent Spain at the Paralympics in this sport. Going into the Games, she had a goal of lifting 85 kilograms and getting a Paralympic diploma.

In May 2012, Zabala was on the shortlist of Spanish sportspeople from Asturias likely to compete at the London Paralympics. In June 2012, Sant Pedor, Barcelona hosted the Spain Powerlifting Championship which she won in the less than 52 kilogram class. She won on a third lift of 100 kilograms after having lifts of 96 and 98 kilograms in her first two attempts. In the process, she set a new Spanish record. Going to London, she had set a personal goal to lift more than 100 kilograms. In London, she was coached by Lodario Ramón Ramón, while competing in the up to 48 kilogram class. She finished in fifth place. At the 2013 IPC European Championships in Russia, she was coached by Antonio Arranz. She finished the competition with a bronze medal following a lift of 96 kilograms. In order to qualify for the Rio Games, she is required to compete in at least one international event between 2013 and 2016.
