= Tsutomu Nagata =

Japanese Paralympic athlete (born 1984)

Personal information
- Born: 20 February 1984 (age 42) Murakami, Japan

Sport
- Country: Japan
- Sport: Para-athletics
- Disability class: T46
- Event: Marathon
Medal record
Representing Japan
Men's para-athletics
Paralympic Games
Bronze medal – third place	2020 Tokyo	Marathon T46
Men's paratriathlon
Asian Championships
Silver medal – second place	2025 Chiba City	PTS5

Tsutomu Nagata (永田 務, Nagata Tsutomu, born 20 February 1984) is a Japanese Paralympic athlete. He won the bronze medal in the men's marathon T46 event at the 2020 Summer Paralympics held in Tokyo, Japan.
