= Bulgaria at the 2008 Summer Paralympics =

- IPC code: BUL
- NPC: Bulgarian Paralympic Association

in Beijing
- Competitors: 8 in 2 sports
- Medals Ranked 60th: Gold 0 Silver 1 Bronze 1 Total 2

Summer Paralympics appearances (overview)
- 1988; 1992; 1996; 2000; 2004; 2008; 2012; 2016; 2020; 2024

Bulgaria competed at the 2008 Summer Paralympics in Beijing.

== Medalists ==
Medal	Name	Sport	Event	Date
Silver	Stela Eneva	Athletics	Women's Discus Throw - F57/58	
Bronze	Daniela Todorova	Athletics	Women's Javelin Throw - F54-56	

== Competing athletes ==
=== Athletics ===
==== Men's track ====
Athlete	Class	Event	Heats		Semifinal		Final	
Athlete	Class	Event	Result	Rank	Result	Rank	Result	Rank
Radoslav Zlatanov	T13	100m	11.32	5 Q	—		11.11	6
Radoslav Zlatanov	T13	200m	23.22	11	did not advance			

==== Men's field ====
Athlete	Class	Event	Final		
Athlete	Class	Event	Result	Points	Rank
Dechko Ovcharov	F42	Discus throw	39.25	-	7
Dechko Ovcharov	F42/44	Javelin throw	45.54	919	7
Mustafa Yuseinov	F55-56	Discus throw	35.73	941	6

==== Women's track ====
Athlete	Class	Event	Heats		Semifinal		Final	
Athlete	Class	Event	Result	Rank	Result	Rank	Result	Rank
Rodastina Ivanova	T12	100m	14.86	16	did not advance			

==== Women's field ====
Athlete	Class	Event	Final		
Athlete	Class	Event	Result	Points	Rank
Stela Eneva	F57-58	Discus throw	34.58	1100	2nd place, silver medalist(s)
Stela Eneva	F57-58	Shot put	10.28	1058	4
Radostina Ivanova	F12	Long jump	2.13	-	14
Ivanka Koleva	F57-58	Discus throw	23.38	887	10
Ivanka Koleva	F57-58	Javelin throw	16.72	839	8
Ivanka Koleva	F57-58	Shot put	9.44	940	6
Daniela Todorova	F54-56	Javelin throw	19.38	1092	3rd place, bronze medalist(s)

=== Powerlifting ===
Athlete	Event	Result	Rank
Ivanka Koleva	Women's 67.5kg	NMR	
Spas Spasov	Men's 82.5kg	NMR	

== Officials ==
The chef de mission was Bulgarian NPC President Ilya Lalov.

== See also ==
- Bulgaria at the 2008 Summer Olympics
