= Uganda at the 2000 Summer Paralympics =

- IPC code: UGA
- NPC: Uganda National Paralympic Committee

in Sydney
- Competitors: 1 in 1 sport
- Medals: Gold 0 Silver 0 Bronze 0 Total 0

Summer Paralympics appearances (overview)
- 1972; 1976; 1980–1992; 1996; 2000; 2004; 2008; 2012; 2016; 2020; 2024

Uganda sent a delegation to compete at the 2000 Summer Paralympics in Sydney, Australia. The country as Uganda entered only one athlete, who competed in swimming. She did not win a medal. Uganda participated in the 2000 Sydney Summer Paralympics with just one athlete, Prossy Tusabe , who competed in women's swimming (100m freestyle, S10 category) but finished last in her heat and did not advance to the final, marking a small but significant presence for the nation at its fourth Paralympic Games appearance.

== Swimming ==
Prossy Tusabe, Uganda's only representative, competed in the women's 100m freestyle (S10 category). She finished last in her heat, her time of 2:12.45 far behind that of the second slowest overall (the United States's Karen Noris, in 1:09.37). Thus she did not advance to the final.

== Key Details ==
- Athlete: Prossy Tusabe.
- Sport: Swimming.
- Event: Women's 100m Freestyle (S10).
- Result: Finished last in her heat (2:12.45), failing to qualify for the final.
- Significance: Uganda has competed in most Summer Paralympics since 1996, often with small delegations, and Prossy Tusabe was the sole representative in 2000.

== See also ==
- Uganda at the 2000 Summer Olympics
- Uganda at the 1972 Summer Paralympics
- Uganda at the 1976 Summer Paralympics
