= Bulgaria at the 2014 Winter Paralympics =

- IPC code: BUL
- NPC: Bulgarian Paralympic Association

in Sochi
- Competitors: 2 in 1 sport
- Medals: Gold 0 Silver 0 Bronze 0 Total 0

Winter Paralympics appearances (overview)
- 1994; 1998; 2002; 2006; 2010; 2014; 2018; 2022; 2026

Bulgaria competed at the 2014 Winter Paralympics in Sochi, Russia, held between 7–16 March 2014. It fielded a total of two athletes, both of whom competed in cross-country skiing. It did not win a medal.

== Cross-country skiing ==
Men

Athlete	Event	Qualification			Semifinal		Final		
Athlete	Event	Real Time	Result	Rank	Result	Rank	Real Time	Result	Rank
Svetoslav Georgiev; Guide: Ivan Birnikov	1km sprint classic, visually impaired	5:04.87	4:58.77	16	did not qualify				
Svetoslav Georgiev; Guide: Ivan Birnikov	10km free, visually impaired	—N/a					37:43.6	36:58.3	19
Zhelyaz Kolev; Guide: Iskren Plankov	1km sprint classic, visually impaired	8:58.46	7:48.46	18	did not qualify				

== See also ==
- Bulgaria at the Paralympics
- Bulgaria at the 2014 Winter Olympics
