= Bulgaria at the 1994 Winter Paralympics =

- IPC code: BUL
- NPC: Bulgarian Paralympic Association

in Lillehammer
- Competitors: 2
- Medals: Gold 0 Silver 0 Bronze 0 Total 0

Winter Paralympics appearances (overview)
- 1994; 1998; 2002; 2006; 2010; 2014; 2018; 2022; 2026

Bulgaria competed at the 1994 Winter Paralympics in Lillehammer, Norway. 2 competitors from Bulgaria won no medals and so did not place in the medal table.

== See also ==
- Bulgaria at the Paralympics
- Bulgaria at the 1994 Winter Olympics
