= Madagascar at the 2012 Summer Paralympics =

- IPC code: MAD
- NPC: Federation Malgache Handisport

in London
- Competitors: 1 in 1 sport
- Medals: Gold 0 Silver 0 Bronze 0 Total 0

Summer Paralympics appearances (overview)
- 2000; 2004; 2008; 2012; 2016; 2020; 2024

Madagascar competed at the 2012 Summer Paralympics in London, United Kingdom from August 29 to September 9, 2012.

== Athletics ==
Men's track

Athlete	Event	Heat		Final	
Athlete	Event	Result	Rank	Result	Rank
Revelinot Raherinandrasana	200m T46	26.41	4	Did not advance	

== See also ==
- Madagascar at the Paralympics
- Madagascar at the 2012 Summer Olympics
