= Armenia at the 2000 Summer Paralympics =

Armenia at the 2006 Winter Paralympics
- IPC code: ARM
- NPC: Armenian National Paralympic Committee

in Turin
- Medals Ranked 69th: Gold 0 Silver 0 Bronze 0 Total 0

Winter Paralympics appearances (overview)
- 1998; 2002; 2006; 2010; 2014; 2018; 2022

Other related appearances
- Soviet Union (1988); Unified Team (1992)

Armenia participated in the 2000 Summer Paralympics in Sydney.

== Medalists ==
	(gold)	(silver)	(bronze)	Total
Armenia	0	0	0	0

== Events ==
=== Sailing ===
- Stasik Nazaryan, Mher Avanesyan and Garush Danielyan (team)

== See also ==
- 2000 Summer Paralympics
- Armenia at the 2000 Summer Olympics
