= European Paralympic Committee =

International regional committee representing Europe

- Formation: 2 July 1999
- Type: Sports federation
- Headquarters: Vienna, Austria
- Members: 49 National Paralympic Committees
- Official language: English
- President: Raymon Blondel
- Website: Official website

The European Paralympic Committee (EPC) is an international non-for-profit organisation which serves a membership of 49 National Paralympic Committees and 9 European branches of disability. Based in Vienna, Austria, the EPC was founded in November 1991 as the IPC European Committee and was later registered as an independent entity in 1999.

The EPC is responsible for organising the European Paralympic Committee Youth Games. Furthermore, the EPC acts as an organisation which promotes and defends the collective interests of National Paralympic Committees, International Organisation of Sports for the Disabled or International Paralympic Sport Federation and European athletes with disabilities.

The EPC has a democratic structure and the governing body of the organisation is elected every two years through a general assembly, where all registered members are entitled to send delegates and cast their vote. The Committee is made up of a president, secretary-general, treasurer, technical officer, athletes' representative and four members-at-large. The current president is Raymon Blondel from the Netherlands.

== Member countries ==
In the following table, the year in which the NPC was recognized by the International Paralympic Committee (IPC) is also given if it is different from the year in which the NPC was created. As of April 2026, there are talks for Albania to create a paralympic committee.

Nation	Code	National Paralympic Committee	Created	Ref.
Andorra	AND	Andorran Adapted Sports Federation		
Armenia	ARM	Armenian Paralympic Committee	1994	
Austria	AUT	Austrian Paralympic Committee	1998	
Azerbaijan	AZE	National Paralympic Committee of Azerbaijan	1996	
Belarus	BLR	Paralympic Committee of the Republic of Belarus		
Belgium	BEL	Belgian Paralympic Committee	1960	
Bosnia and Herzegovina	BIH	Paralympic Committee of Bosnia & Herzegovina		
Bulgaria	BUL	Bulgarian Paralympic Association		
Croatia	CRO	Croatian Paralympic Committee		
Cyprus	CYP	Cyprus National Paralympic Committee	1999	
Czech Republic	CZE	Czech Paralympic Committee		
Denmark	DEN	Paralympic Committee Denmark		
Estonia	EST	Estonian Paralympic Committee	1991	
Faroe Islands	FRO	Faroese Paralympic Committee	1980	
Finland	FIN	Finnish Paralympic Committee	1994	
France	FRA	French Paralympic and Sports Committee	1992	
Georgia	GEO	Georgian Paralympic Committee	2003	
Germany	GER	National Paralympic Committee Germany	1951	
Great Britain	GBR	British Paralympic Association	1989	
Greece	GRE	Hellenic Paralympic Committee	2001	
Hungary	HUN	Hungarian Paralympic Committee		
Iceland	ISL	Icelandic Sports Association for the Disabled		
Ireland	IRL	Paralympics Ireland	1987	
Israel	ISR	Israel Paralympic Committee		
Italy	ITA	Italian Paralympic Committee	1990	
Kosovo	KOS	Paralympic Committee of Kosovo	2023	
Latvia	LAT	Latvian Paralympic Committee		
Liechtenstein	LIE	Liechtensteiner Behinderten Verband		
Lithuania	LTU	Lithuanian Paralympic Committee	1990	
Luxembourg	LUX	Luxembourg Paralympic Committee		
Malta	MLT	Malta Paralympic Committee		
Moldova	MDA	Paralympic Committee of Moldova		
Montenegro	MNE	Paralympic Committee of Montenegro	2007	
Netherlands	NED	Dutch Olympic Committee*Dutch Sports Federation		
North Macedonia	MKD	North Macedonian Paralympic Committee		
Norway	NOR	Norwegian Olympic and Paralympic Committee and Confederation of Sports		
Poland	POL	Polish Paralympic Committee		
Portugal	POR	Portugal Paralympic Committee		
Romania	ROU	National Paralympic Committee, Romania		
Russia	RUS	Russian Paralympic Committee (partially suspended)	1996	
San Marino	SMR	San Marino Paralympic Committee		
Serbia	SRB	Paralympic Committee of Serbia	1999	
Slovakia	SVK	Slovak Paralympic Committee		
Slovenia	SLO	Paralympic Committee of Slovenia - Sports Federation for the Disabled of Slovenia		
Spain	ESP	Spanish Paralympic Committee	1995	
Sweden	SWE	Swedish Parasports Federation	1969	
Switzerland	SUI	Swiss Paralympic Committee		
Turkey	TUR	Turkish Paralympic Committee	2002	
Ukraine	UKR	National Sports Committee for the Disabled of Ukraine		

== Events ==
=== European Para Championships ===
The European Para Championships are held every four years in the year proceeding the Summer Paralympic Games and have been given the status of a regional games by the European Paralympic Committee.

=== European Para Youth Games (EPYG) ===
The European Para Youth Games is a biennial multi-sport event for young para-athletes aged between 13 and 23.

=== European Winter Para Sports Event ===
The first European Winter Para Sports Event (ParaSki4Europe) was held in 2020 in Poland:

Number	Year	Host	Sports	Athletes	Countries
1	2020	Czarna Gora, Poland	4	150	12

== See also ==
- International Paralympic Committee
- European Olympic Committees
