= Bulgaria at the 2016 Summer Paralympics =

- IPC code: BUL
- NPC: Bulgarian Paralympic Association

in Rio de Janeiro
- Competitors: 7 in 3 sports
- Medals Ranked 60th: Gold 1 Silver 0 Bronze 0 Total 1

Summer Paralympics appearances (overview)
- 1988; 1992; 1996; 2000; 2004; 2008; 2012; 2016; 2020; 2024

Bulgaria competed at the 2016 Summer Paralympics in Rio de Janeiro, Brazil, from 7 September to 18 September 2016.

== Disability classifications ==
Every participant at the Paralympics has their disability grouped into one of five disability categories; amputation, the condition may be congenital or sustained through injury or illness; cerebral palsy; wheelchair athletes, there is often overlap between this and other categories; visual impairment, including blindness; Les autres, any physical disability that does not fall strictly under one of the other categories, for example dwarfism or multiple sclerosis. Each Paralympic sport then has its own classifications, dependent upon the specific physical demands of competition. Events are given a code, made of numbers and letters, describing the type of event and classification of the athletes competing. Some sports, such as athletics, divide athletes by both the category and severity of their disabilities, other sports, for example swimming, group competitors from different categories together, the only separation being based on the severity of the disability.

== Delegation ==
The country sent a team of 7 athletes, 4 men and 3 women, along with 2 officials to the 2016 Summer Paralympics. They competed in athletics, shooting and table tennis.

== Medallists ==
Medal	Name	Sport	Event	Date
Gold	Ruzhdi Ruzhdi	Athletics	Men's Shot Put F54-55	16 September

== Athletics ==
Men's Track

Athlete	Events	Heat		Final	
Athlete	Events	Time	Rank	Time	Rank
Radoslav Zlatanov	100 m T13	11.15	3 Q	11.38	7
Hristiyan Stoyanov	1500 m T45-46	—N/a		4:08.99	7

Men's Field

Athlete	Events	Result	Rank
Ruzhdi Ruzhdi	Shot Put F54-55	12.33	1st place, gold medalist(s)
Ruzhdi Ruzhdi	Discus F54-56	38.04	6

Women's Field

Athlete	Events	Result	Rank
Ivanka Koleva	Shot Put F56-57	8.42	6
Ivanka Koleva	Discus F56-57	20.52	10
Daniela Todorova	Discus F54-56	did not start	
Daniela Todorova	Javelin F55-56	19.54	5

== Shooting ==
The country sent shooters to 2015 IPC IPC Shooting World Cup in Osijek, Croatia, where Rio direct qualification was available. They earned a qualifying spot at this event based on the performance of Milena Todorova in the R4 – 10m Air Rifle Standing Mixed SH2 event.

Athlete	Event	Qualification		Final	
Athlete	Event	Score	Rank	Score	Rank
Milena Todorova	Mixed 10 m air rifle standing SH2	627.2	13	did not advance	
Milena Todorova	Mixed 10 m air rifle prone SH2	628.6	22	did not advance	

== Table Tennis ==
Men

Athlete	Event	Group Matches			Round of 16	Quarterfinals	Semifinals	Final / BM	
Athlete	Event	Opposition Result	Opposition Result	Rank	Opposition Result	Opposition Result	Opposition Result	Opposition Result	Rank
Denislav Kodjabashev	Singles class 10	Lian (CHN); W 3–1	Ahmed (EGY); W 3–0	1 Q	Bye	Gardos (AUT); L 2–3	did not advance		

== See also ==
- Bulgaria at the 2016 Summer Olympics
