= Lodario Ramón =

Spanish Paralympic coach (born 1954)

Personal information
- Full name: Lodario Ramón Ramón
- Born: 1954 (age 71–72) Fresnedelo, Cáceres, Spain

Sport
- Country: Spain
- Sport: Powerlifting

Lodario Ramón Ramón (born 1954) is a weightlifter and powerlifting coach from Spain. He has coached the Spain national team at the 2004, 2008 and 2012 Summer Paralympics.

== Personal ==
Ramón was born in Fresnedelo, Cáceres. Later, he moved to Asturias. While in high school, he participated in gymnastics. Around that time, he moved to Ponferrada. In 1985, he moved to Oviedo.

== Powerlifting ==
Ramón first became interested in gyms and weightlifting after reading about them in a magazine. Following his move to Ponferrada, he talked to a bodybuilder named Campillo who encouraged him to try weightlifting. On his first attempt, he was able to lift 65 kilograms. A coach named Tito saw him and recruited him. After three months of training, he was able to lift 100 kilograms and was able to become the local champion in Castilla and León. He is a Spanish champion in the sport. Later, he took a course to become trained as a coach and trained ten weightlifters for three years. He has been described as the best powerlifting coach in Spain.

Ramón was a coach for Spain at the 2004 Summer Paralympics. He was the coach for the Spain national team at the 2008 Games. He began coaching Loida Zabala Ollero in 2006, and helped her to finish in seventh place at the IPC European Championships in 2007. Zabala moved to train where Ramón lived. In 2008, Ramón coached Zabala at the Sports Palace (Spanish: Palacio de los Deportes). He coached Zabala at the 2012 Summer Paralympics.
