= Shi Shanshan =

Chinese Paralympic powerlifter

Personal information
- Born: December 13, 1988 (age 37) Handan, China

Sport
- Country: China
- Sport: Paralympic powerlifting
Medal record
Representing China
Paralympic Games
Bronze medal – third place	2012 London	48 kg
Asian Para Games
Gold medal – first place	2010 Guangzhou	48 kg
Gold medal – first place	2014 Incheon	55 kg
World Championships
Silver medal – second place	2014 Dubai	55 kg

Shi Shanshan (born 13 December 1988) is a Chinese Paralympic powerlifter. She represented China at the 2008 Summer Paralympics, at the 2012 Summer Paralympics and at the 2016 Summer Paralympics and she won the bronze medal in the women's 48 kg event in 2012.

At the 2010 Asian Para Games held in Guangzhou, China, she won the gold medal in the women's 48 kg event. At the 2014 IPC Powerlifting World Championships she won the silver medal in the women's 55 kg event.

At the 2018 Asia-Oceania Open Powerlifting Championships, she won the silver medal in the women's 55 kg event.
