= Aleksandr Iaremchuk =

Russian Paralympic biathlete

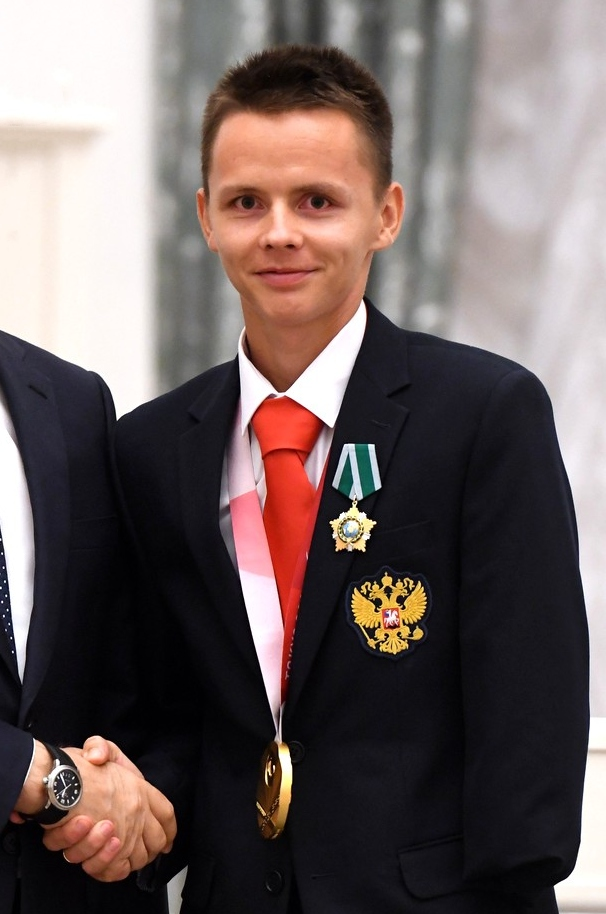
- Iaremchuk in 2021

Personal information
- Nationality: Russian
- Born: 19 February 1995 (age 31) Shangaly, Russia

Sport
- Sport: Biathlon; Cross-country skiing Athletics
- Disability class: T46 (athletics)
- Club: Arkhangelsk Regional Adaptive Sports School
- Coached by: Sergey Kodlozerov; Amir Gumerov; Irina Gromova (all winter sports); Vyacheslav Sadovnikov (athletics)
Medal record
Para-athletics
Representing Neutral Paralympic Athletes
Paralympic Games
| Gold medal – first place | 2024 Paris | 1500 m T46 |
World Championships
| Gold medal – first place | 2024 Kobe | 1500 m T46 |
| Gold medal – first place | 2025 New Delhi | 1500 m T46 |
Representing RPC
Paralympic Games
| Gold medal – first place | 2020 Tokyo | 1500 m T46 |
Representing Russia
World Championships
| Bronze medal – third place | 2019 Dubai | 1500 m T46 |
European Championships
| Gold medal – first place | 2016 Grosseto | 1500 m T46 |
| Gold medal – first place | 2021 Bydgoszcz | 1500 m T46 |

Aleksandr Vitalyevich Iaremchuk (Russian: Александр Витальевич Яремчук; born 19 February 1995) is a Russian cross-country skier, para-biathlete and para-athlete.

== Career ==
Iaremchuk represented Russia at the 2014 Winter Paralympics in the biathlon and cross-country skiing.

He also competes in the Summer Paralympics. He represented Russian Paralympic Committee athletes at the 2020 Summer Paralympics in the 1500 metres T46 event and won a gold medal.

== Personal life ==
Iaremchuk lost his left arm around the age of seven. He took up athletics aged 13. He has two sons with his wife Anastasia: Yermil (born 2017) and Arseny (born 2021).
