= Alex Pires da Silva =

Brazilian Paralympic athlete (born 1990)

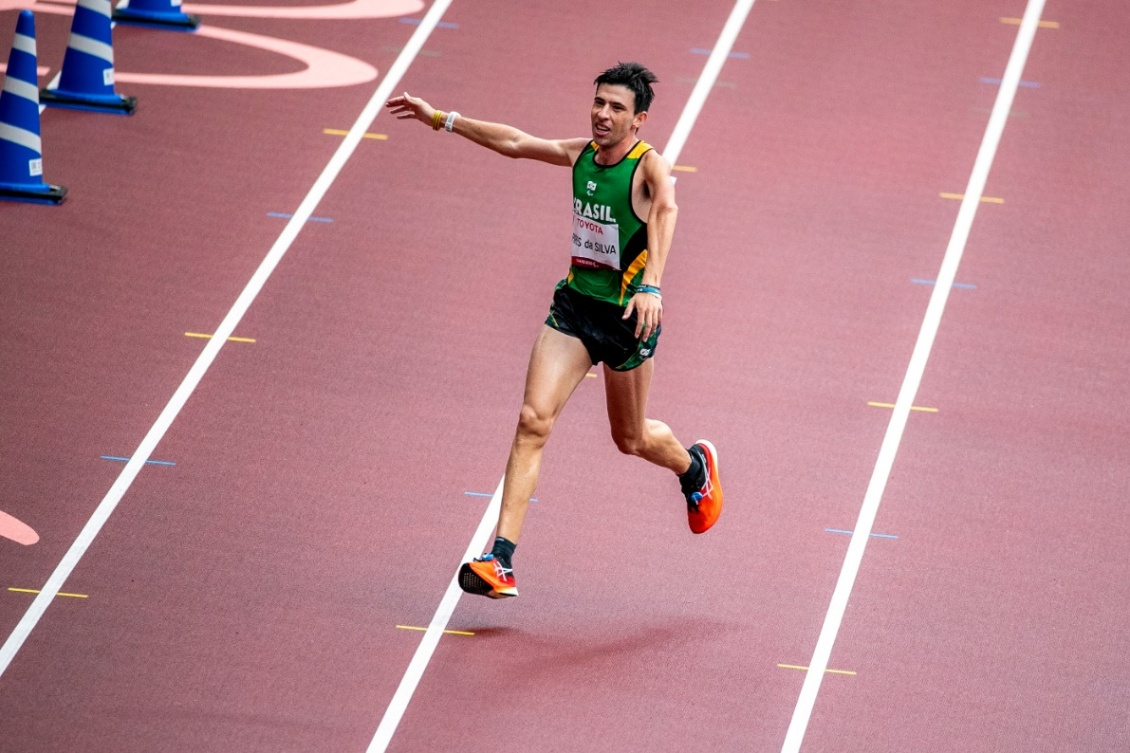
- Pires at the 2020 Summer Paralympics

Personal information
- Full name: Alex Douglas Pires da Silva
- Nationality: Brazilian
- Born: 7 May 1990 (age 36)

Sport
- Sport: Para athletics
- Disability: Congenital limb
- Disability class: T46
Medal record
Representing Brazil
Paralympic Games
Silver medal – second place	2020 Tokyo	Marathon T46

Alex Douglas Pires da Silva (born 7 May 1990) was a Brazilian silver medalist in Athletics at the 2020 Summer Paralympics – Men's marathon T46. He is a past winner of the 2017 London Marathon for T46 athletes. He has a congenital limb deficiency.
