= Christine Akullo =

Ugandan Paralympic athlete

Christine Akullo (born 23 June 1990) is a Ugandan Paralympic athlete competing in the T13 Category. Akullo won Gold for Uganda in the T13 100m at the 2011 All Africa Games in Maputo, Mozambique as well as the 2015 All Africa Games. She was also Uganda's flag bearer at the 2012 Summer Paralympics in London.

== Background and education ==
Akullo was born in Aboke, Soroti District, Uganda to Joseph Ayom and Jennet Rose Agiro. After contracting malaria in 1998, she became partially blind.

Between 1996 and 2004, she received her early education at Namatala Primary School in Mbale District. She later joined St Francis Madera School for the Blind in Soroti in 2006 and completed her A-Level in 2011. Locally she is sponsored by Child Fund International and it was reported that she would be joining Makerere University in September 2012 to pursue a bachelor's degree in Sports Science. As of 2015, Akullo living in Morungatuny Sub County in Amuria district.

== Athletics ==
She joined the national team in 2007 though other sources state that she took up para-athletics in 2010 while in Soroti. She participated in several district championships where she competed in the 100m, 200m and 400m.

According to the Daily Monitor, her first international race was in 2010 at the Great Lakes championship in Nairobi, Kenya, where she won gold in 100m, 200m, and 400m. She followed that up with a gold medal in the women's T13 100m final at the Africa Games that were held in Maputo, Mozambique

In 2015, Akullo run in 13.34 seconds to win another gold medal in the final of the women's T13 100m at the Africa Games that were held in Brazzaville. Later in 2017, she entered and competed in the T13, F13 100 and 400m at the World Para Athletics Championships in London.

Akullo later represented Uganda at the 2019 World Para Athletics Championships in Dubai in November of that year where she finished fifth in the second heat of the T13 100m semifinal thus putting her Olympic qualification on hold.

== See also ==
- Athletics at the 2011 All-Africa Games
- Athletics at the 2015 All-Africa Games
