= Losar de la Vera =

Losar de la Vera, Spain
- Municipality
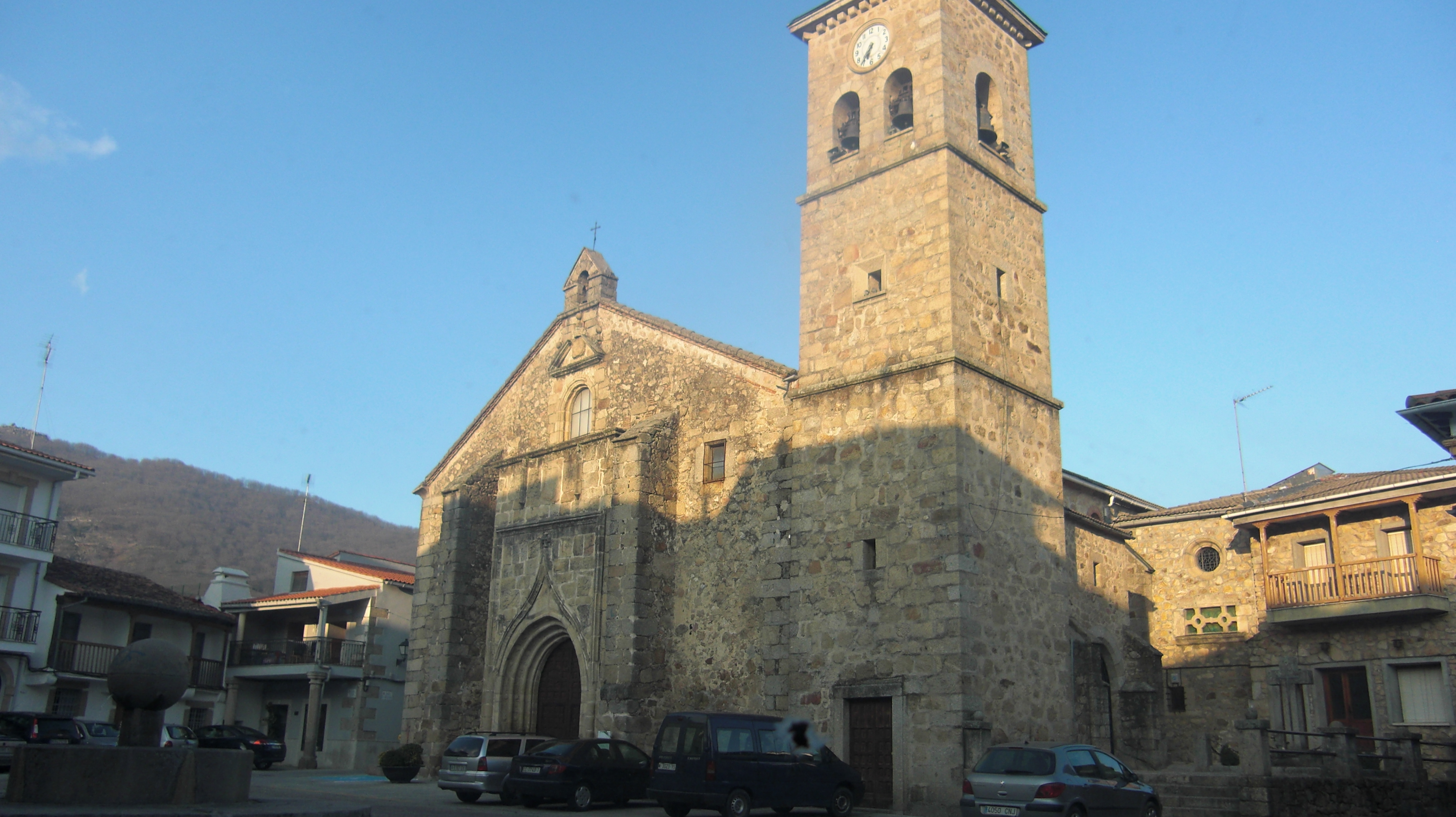

- Flag Coat of arms
- Interactive map of Losar de la Vera, Spain
- Coordinates: 40°07′N 5°36′W
- Country: Spain
- Autonomous community: Extremadura
- Province: Cáceres
- Municipality: Losar de la Vera

Area
  - Total: 82 km^{2} (32 sq mi)
- Elevation: 545 m (1,788 ft)

Population (2025-01-01)
  - Total: 2,799
  - Density: 34/km^{2} (88/sq mi)
- Time zone: UTC+1 (CET)
  - Summer (DST): UTC+2 (CEST)
- Website: www.losardelavera.com

Losar de la Vera is a municipality located in the province of Cáceres, Extremadura, Spain. According to the 2009 Extremadura Social-economic Atlas, the municipality has a population of 2988 inhabitants: 1555 men and 1433 women. The size of the municipality is 82 hectares.

Losar de la Vera is situated in the center of Spain. It has gardens around the road that represent different animals, Cuartos Roman Bridge and mountains. Most of the population makes its living by agriculture; the most important products are fresh cheese, paprika powder and tobacco.

== Wildlife ==
The mammal most important in the area is the ibex, whose males have peculiar antlers, like a lira. Other animals such as weasels, wild boars, badgers, otters and foxes live in the area.

Birdwatchers can find a great diversity in this area: diurnal birds such as the black kite, the kite, the short-toed eagle, golden eagle, the blue black-shouldered kite, the griffon vulture, and the buzzard; nocturnal predators like the barn owl and tawny owl; corvids like the crow, the jackdaw, the chough, the Dartford, and the jay; the white stork that today, like many other birds, has stopped migrating because of its adaptation to landfills and dumps where they have food throughout the year; and small birds such as thrushes, orioles, hoopoes, cuckoos and partridges.

== Monuments ==
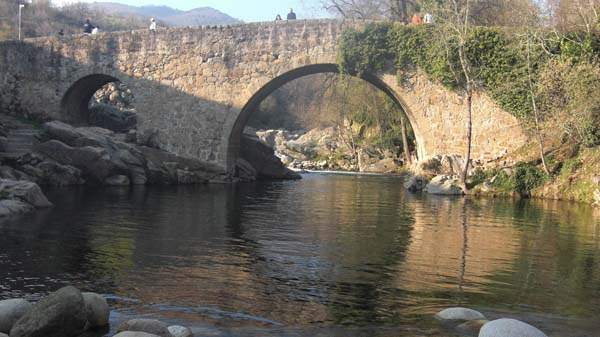
Cuartos Bridge

- Santiago Apostol Church
- Misericordia Christ Hermitage
- San Roque Hermitage
- San Isidro Hermitage
- Cuartos Bridge
- San Cristobal Hermitage
- Gardens
- Natural mountains of "Sierra de Gredos"

== See also ==
- List of municipalities in Cáceres
