= Greta Vardanyan =

Armenian Paralympic athlete

Personal information
- National team: Armenia
- Born: Greta Khndzrtsyan; February 20, 1986 (age 40)
- Education: Armenian State Pedagogical University
- Occupation: Psychologist

Sport
- Country: Armenia
- Sport: Powerlifting
- Disability: Above knee amputation on both legs
- Weight class: 55 kg
- League: World Para Powerlifting World Cup
- Coached by: Samson Khachatryan

Greta Vardanyan (born February 20, 1986) is an Armenian powerlifter and Para-alpine skier. She has competed on four occasions for Armenia at the Paralympic Games, one Winter and three Summer. Vardanyan was the flag bearer on each occasion when she attended a Summer Games.

== Early life ==
Greta Vardanyan (née Khndzrtsyan) was born on February 20, 1986. When she was two, she was injured in the 1988 Armenian earthquake. As a result, both her legs were amputated above the knee. Vardanyan's parents and siblings died due to injuries sustained in the earthquake.

== Sporting career ==
=== Para-alpine skiing ===
Vardanyan started to compete in sports in 1993, initially in para-alpine skiing. She was spotted, and between 2002 and 2005 she took part competitively in the United States. Still using her maiden name, she was one of two athletes competing for Armenia at the 2006 Winter Paralympics in Turin, Italy. Vardanyan took part in the women's sitting giant slalom, finishing with an overall time of 3:43.29 in 11th position.

=== Weightlifting ===
She began competing in weightlifting professionally in 2005, and took part in her first international competition two years later, when at the European Open Championships in Greece, she placed second in her weight class and won a silver medal. Her first Summer Paralympics came in Beijing, China, in 2008. She was selected to be the flag bearer for Armenia during the Parade of Nations in the opening ceremony. Vardanyan did not place in the women's 48 kg weight class after failing to lift 80 kilograms (180 lb) on three occasions.

In 2012, she was chosen as part of a female only team, alongside swimmer Maga Hovakimyan, for Armenia to compete in the 2012 Summer Paralympics in London, England. For the second time, she was selected as the flag bearer for Armenia at the Parade of Nations during the opening ceremony. Vardanyan finished outside of the medal positions, having lifted a weight of 82 kilograms (181 lb) in the Women's 48 kg competition.

Vardanyan was once again selected to compete for Armenia at the 2016 Summer Paralympics, in Rio de Janeiro, Brazil. As with the previous two games, she was chosen as her nation's flag bearer in the Parade of Nations. She finished in fifth place in her weight class, her heaviest lift being 96 kilograms (212 lb) out of her three successful attempts.

Vardanyan finished in second place at the opening event of the World Para Powerlifting World Cup in 2017, held in Eger, Hungary. Taking part in the 55 kg class, she lifted 85 kilograms (187 lb), only beaten by Chile's Camila Campos with a lift of 92 kilograms (203 lb).

== Personal life ==
Vardanyan is married and has a daughter. She lives in Gyumri, Shirak Province, with her family. Outside of sports, she is a psychologist, having studied at the Armenian State Pedagogical University
