= Bulgaria at the 2024 Summer Paralympics =

Bulgaria participation at the 2024 Summer Paralympic Games in Paris

- Flag of Bulgaria
- IPC code: BUL
- NPC: Bulgarian Paralympic Association

in Paris, France August 28, 2024 – September 8, 2024
- Competitors: 3 (2 men and 1 woman) in 1 sport
- Flag bearer: Stela Eneva
- Medals Ranked 65th: Gold 1 Silver 0 Bronze 0 Total 1

Summer Paralympics appearances (overview)
- 1988; 1992; 1996; 2000; 2004; 2008; 2012; 2016; 2020; 2024

Bulgaria competed at the 2024 Summer Paralympics in Paris, France, from 28 August to 8 September 2024.

== Medalists ==
Medal	Name	Sport	Event	Date
Gold	Ruzhdi Ruzhdi	Athletics	Shot put F55	30 August

=== Medals by sport ===
Medals by sport
Sport	1st place, gold medalist(s)	2nd place, silver medalist(s)	3rd place, bronze medalist(s)	Total
Athletics	1	0	0	1
Total	1	0	0	1

=== Medals by gender ===
Medals by gender
Gender	1st place, gold medalist(s)	2nd place, silver medalist(s)	3rd place, bronze medalist(s)	Total
Female	0	0	0	0
Male	1	0	0	1
Mixed	0	0	0	0
Total	1	0	0	1

=== Medals by date ===
Medals by date
Date	1st place, gold medalist(s)	2nd place, silver medalist(s)	3rd place, bronze medalist(s)	Total
30 August	1	0	0	1
Total	1	0	0	1

== Competitors ==
The following is the list of number of competitors in the Games.

Sport	Men	Women	Total
Athletics	2	1	3
Total	2	1	3

== Athletics ==
Key

- Note–Ranks given for track events are within the athlete's heat only
- Q = Qualified for the next round
- q = Qualified for the next round as a fastest loser or, in field events, by position without achieving the qualifying target
- DQ = Disqualified
- PR = Paralympic Record
- AR = Area (or continental) Record
- NR = National Record
- SB = Season's Best
- N/A = Round not applicable for the event
- Bye = Athlete not required to compete in round

Men

Athlete	Event	Final	
Athlete	Event	Result	Rank
Ruzhdi Ruzhdi	Men's shot put F55	12.40	1st place, gold medalist(s)
Hristiyan Stoyanov	Men's 1500 m T46	3:52.27	4

Women

Athlete	Event	Final	
Athlete	Event	Result	Rank
Stela Eneva	Women's discus throw F57	30.59	4

== See also ==
- Bulgaria at the 2024 Summer Olympics
- Bulgaria at the Paralympics
