= Li Chaoyan =

Chinese Paralympic athlete

Personal information
- Born: 5 August 1989 (age 36) Yunnan, China

Sport
- Country: China
- Sport: Para-athletics
- Disability class: T46
- Event: Marathon
Medal record
Paralympic Games
Gold medal – first place	2016 Rio de Janeiro	Marathon T46
Gold medal – first place	2020 Tokyo	Marathon T46

Li Chaoyan (born 5 August 1989) is a Chinese Paralympic athlete. He won the gold medal in the men's marathon T46 event at the 2016 Summer Paralympics held in Rio de Janeiro, Brazil. He also won the gold medal in the same event at the 2020 Summer Paralympics held in Tokyo, Japan.
