= Armenian Paralympic Committee =

National Paralympic Committee of Armenia

Armenian National Paralympic Committee

National Paralympic Committee
- Country: Armenia
- Code: ARM
- Created: 1994
- Continental association: EPC
- Headquarters: Yerevan
- President: Hakob Abrahamyan
- Website: paralympic.am

The Armenian National Paralympic Committee (Armenian: Հայաստանի ազգային պարալիմպիկ կոմիտե, romanized: Hayastani Azgayin Paralimpik Komite), is the National Paralympic Committee and regulating body of paralympic sports in Armenia. The headquarters of the organization is located in Yerevan.

== History ==
The Armenian National Paralympic Committee was established in 1994 and is currently led by president Hakob Abrahamyan. The organization is responsible for Armenia's participation in the summer and winter Paralympic Games and the Special Olympics. The Armenian National Paralympic Committee is a full member of the International Paralympic Committee and the European Paralympic Committee. The organization also works closely with the Armenian National Disabled Sports Federation.

== See also ==
- Armenia at the Paralympics
- Armenian Olympic Committee
- Sport in Armenia
