= Bulgaria at the Paralympics =

- IPC code: BUL
- NPC: Bulgarian Paralympic Association
- Medals: Gold 6 Silver 9 Bronze 3 Total 18

Summer appearances
- 1988; 1992; 1996; 2000; 2004; 2008; 2012; 2016; 2020; 2024

Winter appearances
- 1994; 1998; 2002; 2006; 2010; 2014; 2018; 2022

Bulgaria made its Paralympic Games début at the 1988 Summer Paralympics in Seoul, sending three competitors in track and field, and a men's goalball team. The country has participated in every subsequent edition of the Summer Paralympics. It made its Winter Paralympics début in 1994, and has taken part in every edition of the Winter Games since then.

Bulgarian athletes have won a total of five gold medals, nine silver and three bronze. All these medals have been won at the Summer Games, and all but one in track and field; the exception is Polina Dzhurova's silver medal in swimming in 1996, in the women's 100m backstroke (S6 category).

1988 was Bulgaria's most successful year. Gueorgui Sakelarov became the country's first Paralympic champion when he took gold in both the discus and the shot put (B2 category). Compatriot Donko Angelov won Bulgaria's third medal of the Games, a silver, in the triple jump (B3). Ivan Hristov narrowly missed out on a medal when he finished fourth in the high jump (B1).

Sakelarov has won three of Bulgaria's five Paralympic gold medals. He successfully defended his title in the shot put in 1992, though he won "only" silver in the discus that year. Bulgaria's fifth and most recent gold medal was won by Ruzhdi Ruzhdi in the men's shot put (F54-55) in 2016.

== Medal tallies ==
=== Summer Paralympics ===
Event	Gold	Silver	Bronze	Total	Ranking
1988 Summer Paralympics	2	1	0	3	32nd
1992 Summer Paralympics	1	2	0	3	38th
1996 Summer Paralympics	0	1	1	2	55th
2000 Summer Paralympics	1	0	0	1	49th
2004 Summer Paralympics	0	0	0	0	-
2008 Summer Paralympics	0	1	1	2	60th
2012 Summer Paralympics	0	2	1	3	59th
2016 Summer Paralympics	1	0	0	1	60th
2020 Summer Paralympics	0	2	0	2	69th
2024 Summer Paralympics	1	0	0	1	65th

=== Winter Paralympics ===
Event	Gold	Silver	Bronze	Total	Ranking
1994 Winter Paralympics	0	0	0	0	-
1998 Winter Paralympics	0	0	0	0	-
2002 Winter Paralympics	0	0	0	0	-
2006 Winter Paralympics	0	0	0	0	-
2010 Winter Paralympics	0	0	0	0	-
2014 Winter Paralympics	0	0	0	0	-
2018 Winter Paralympics	0	0	0	0	-
2026 Winter Paralympics	0	0	0	0	-

== Medallists ==
=== Summer Games ===
Medal	Name	Games	Sport	Event
Gold	Gueorgui Sakelarov	1988 Seoul	Athletics	Men's discus throw B2
Gold	Gueorgui Sakelarov	1988 Seoul	Athletics	Men's shot put B2
Silver	Donko Angelov	1988 Seoul	Athletics	Men's triple jump B3
Gold	Gueorgui Sakelarov	1992 Barcelona	Athletics	Men's shot put B2
Silver	Donko Angelov	1992 Barcelona	Athletics	Men's triple jump B3
Silver	Gueorgui Sakelarov	1992 Barcelona	Athletics	Men's discus throw B2
Silver	Polina Dzhurova	1996 Atlanta	Swimming	Women's 100m backstroke S6
Bronze	Gueorgui Sakelarov	1996 Atlanta	Athletics	Men's discus F11
Gold	Ivanka Koleva	2000 Sydney	Athletics	Women's shot put F57
Silver	Stela Eneva	2008 Beijing	Athletics	Women's discus throw F57/58
Bronze	Daniela Todorova	2008 Beijing	Athletics	Women's javelin throw F54-56
Silver	Stela Eneva	2012 London	Athletics	Women's discus throw F57-58
Silver	Stela Eneva	2012 London	Athletics	Women's shot put F57-58
Bronze	Radoslav Zlatanov	2012 London	Athletics	Men's long jump F13
Gold	Ruzhdi Ruzhdi	2016 Rio de Janeiro	Athletics	Men's shot put F54-55
Silver	Ruzhdi Ruzhdi	2020 Tokyo	Athletics	Men's shot put F55
Silver	Hristiyan Stoyanov	2020 Tokyo	Athletics	Men's 1500 metres T46
Gold	Ruzhdi Ruzhdi	2024 Paris	Athletics	Men's shot put F55

== See also ==
- Bulgaria at the Olympics
