= David Emong =

Ugandan Paralympic athlete (born 1990)

Sport
- Country: Uganda
- Sport: Athletics
Medal record
Para-athletics
Representing Uganda
Paralympic Games
Silver medal – second place	2016 Rio de Janeiro	1500 m T46
Bronze medal – third place	2020 Tokyo	1500 m T46

David Emong (born 1990) is an Ugandan disabled athlete who competes in sprint and medium distance running. He won Uganda's first Paralympic medal at the 2016 Paralympic Games, gaining a silver medal in the Men's 1500 metres T46.
