= Athletics at the 2024 Summer Paralympics – Men's 100 metres =

Athletics – Men's 100 metres at the XVII Paralympic Games
- Venue: Stade de France
- Dates: 30 August – 7 September 2024
- No. of events: 16

100 metres at the 2024 Summer Paralympics
Men · T11 · T12 · T13 · T34 · T35 · T36 · T37 · T38 · T44 · T47 · T51 · T52 · T53 · T54 · T63 · T64
Women · T11 · T12 · T13 · T34 · T35 · T36 · T37 · T38 · T47 · T53 · T54 · T63 · T64

The Men's 100m athletics events for the 2024 Summer Paralympics took place at the Stade de France from 30 August to 7 September 2024. A total of 16 events were contested over the distance. T11 and T12 events were hosted over three rounds, in order to accommodate sighted guides, while the T51 event was held as a straight final. All other 100 metre events consisted of a first round and a final.

== Schedule ==
R	Round 1	½	Semifinals	F	Final

Date	Fri 30		Sat 31		Sun 1		Mon 2		Tue 3		Wed 4		Thu 5		Fri 6		Sat 7	
Event	M	E	M	E	M	E	M	E	M	E	M	E	M	E	M	E	M	E
T11 100m											R	½		F				
T12 100m	R		½	F														
T13 100m					R	F												
T34 100m					R		F											
T35 100m							R	F										
T36 100m																R	F	
T37 100m	R	F																
T38 100m			R	F														
T44 100m				R		F												
T47 100m	R	F																
T51 100m																F		
T52 100m														R	F			
T53 100m											R	F						
T54 100m											R	F						
T63 100m						R		F										
T64 100m						R		F										

== Medal summary ==
The following is a summary of the medals awarded across all 100 metres events.

Classification	Gold		Silver		Bronze	
T11	Athanasios Ghavelas; Greece	11.02 SB	Timothée Adolphe; France	11.05 =SB	Di Dongdong; China	11.08 SB
T12	Noah Malone; United States	10.71	Joeferson Marinho; Brazil	10.84	Zac Shaw; Great Britain	10.94
T13	Skander Djamil Athmani; Algeria	10.42	Salum Ageze Kashafali; Norway	10.47	Shuta Kawakami; Japan	10.80
T34	Chaiwat Rattana; Thailand	14.76 PR	Walid Ktila; Tunisia	15.14	Austin Smeenk; Canada	15.19
T35	Ihor Tsvietov; Ukraine	11.43 PB	Artem Kalashian; Neutral Paralympic Athletes	11.70 PB	Dmitrii Safronov; Neutral Paralympic Athletes	11.79 PB
T36	James Turner; Australia	11.85 =PR, SB	Alexis Chavez; Argentina	11.88 (.871)	Yang Yifei; China	11.88 (.877) =SB
T37	Ricardo Mendonça; Brazil	11.07	Saptoyogo Purnomo; Indonesia	11.26 AR	Andrei Vdovin; Neutral Paralympic Athletes	11.41
T38	Jaydin Blackwell; United States	10.64	Ryan Medrano; United States	10.97	Juan Campas; Colombia	10.99
T44	Mpumelelo Mhlongo; South Africa	11.12	Yamel Luis Vives Suares; Cuba	11.20	Eddy Bernard; Malaysia	11.58
T47	Petrucio Ferreira dos Santos; Brazil	10.68	Korban Best; United States	10.75	Aymane El Haddaoui; Morocco	10.78
T51	Cody Fournie; Canada	19.63 PR, AR	Peter Genyn; Belgium	20.47	Toni Piispanen; Finland	21.14 SB
T52	Maxime Carabin; Belgium	16.70	Marcus Perrineau-Daley; Great Britain	17.27	Tomoki Sato; Japan	17.44
T53	Abdulrahman Al-Qurashi; Saudi Arabia	14.48 PB	Pongsakorn Paeyo; Thailand	14.66 SB	Ariosvaldo Fernandes da Silva; Brazil	15.08
T54	Juan Pablo Cervantes; Mexico	13.74 AR	Athiwat Paeng-Nuea; Thailand	13.79 SB	Leo-Pekka Tahti; Finland	13.86
T63	Ezra Frech; United States	12.06 PB	Daniel Wagner; Denmark	12.08 PB	Vinícius Gonçalves Rodrigues; Brazil	12.10 PB
T64	Sherman Guity; Costa Rica	10.65 PR	Maxcel Amo Manu; Italy	10.76	Felix Streng; Germany	10.77

== Results ==
The following were the results of the finals only of each of the Men's 100 metres events in each of the classifications. Further details of each event, including where appropriate heats and semi finals results, are available on that event's dedicated page.

=== T11 ===
The T11 category is for athletes with a visual impairment. A T11 athlete may be entirely without sight, or be able to perceive light, but have no ability to see the shape of a hand at any distance. T11 athletes commonly run with guides.

The final in this classification took place on 5 September 2024, at 19:08:

Rank	Lane	Name	Nationality	Time	Notes
1st place, gold medalist(s)	5	Athanasios Ghavelas; Guide: Ioannis Nyfantopoulos	Greece	11.02	SB
2nd place, silver medalist(s)	3	Timothée Adolphe; Guide: Charles Renard	France	11.05	=SB
3rd place, bronze medalist(s)	7	Di Dongdong; Guide: Lian Jiageng	China	11.08	SB
4	1	Ananias Shikongo; Guide: Even Tjiviju	Namibia	11.17	SB
				Wind: +0.3 m/s	

=== T12 ===
The T12 category is for athletes with visual impairment. Athletes in this category will generally have some residual sight, the ability to recognise the shape of a hand at a distance of 2 metres and the ability to perceive clearly will be no more than 2/60. T12 athletes commonly run with guides.

The final in this classification took place on 31 August 2024, at 21:07:

Rank	Lane	Name	Nationality	Time	Notes
1st place, gold medalist(s)	3	Noah Malone	United States	10.71	
2nd place, silver medalist(s)	1	Joeferson Marinho de Oliveira	Brazil	10.84	
3rd place, bronze medalist(s)	7	Zac Shaw	Great Britain	10.94	
	5	~~Serkan Yıldırım~~	~~Turkey~~	DQ ~~10.70~~	
				Wind: -0.3 m/s	

=== T13 ===
The T13 category is for athletes with a moderate visual impairment. Athletes in this category have a variety of visual impairments, but can typically recognize contours from a distance of 2 to 6 metres. Athletes in this category do not typically require a guide.

The final in this classification took place on 1 September 2024, at 19:47:

Rank	Lane	Name	Nationality	Time	Notes
1st place, gold medalist(s)	4	Skander Djamil Athmani	Algeria	10.42	PR
2nd place, silver medalist(s)	5	Salum Ageze Kashafali	Norway	10.47	SB
3rd place, bronze medalist(s)	7	Shuta Kawakami	Japan	10.80	
4	6	Chad Perris	Australia	10.80	
5	2	Isaac Jean-Paul	United States	10.93	SB
6	3	Zak Skinner	Great Britain	10.93	
7	8	Samba Coulibaly	Mali	10.97	
8	9	Johannes Nambala	Namibia	11.09	SB
				Wind: -0.1 m/s	

=== T34 ===
The T34 category is for wheelchair athletes with cerebral palsy. Athletes in this category have minimal limitations or control problems in their arms and trunk while pushing a wheelchair.

The final in this classification took place on 2 September 2024, at 11:11:

Rank	Lane	Name	Nationality	Time	Notes
1st place, gold medalist(s)	5	Chaiwat Rattana	Thailand	14.76	PR
2nd place, silver medalist(s)	4	Walid Ktila	Tunisia	15.14	
3rd place, bronze medalist(s)	6	Austin Smeenk	Canada	15.19	
4	3	Rheed McCracken	Australia	15.31	SB
5	2	Mohamad Othman	United Arab Emirates	15.40	
6	7	Ali Arshid	Qatar	15.42	
7	8	Henry Manni	Finland	15.64	
8	9	Gong Wenhao	China	15.67	
				Wind: -0.8 m/s	

=== T35 ===
The T35 category is for ambulant athletes with cerebral palsy. The typical T35 athlete may need assistive devices for walking. The athlete may have sufficient function to run but demonstrates poor balance.

The final in this classification took place on 2 September 2024, at 19:08:

Rank	Lane	Name	Nationality	Time	Notes
1st place, gold medalist(s)	7	Ihor Tsvietov	Ukraine	11.43	PB
2nd place, silver medalist(s)	4	Artem Kalashian	Neutral Paralympic Athletes	11.70	PB
3rd place, bronze medalist(s)	5	Dmitrii Safronov	Neutral Paralympic Athletes	11.79	SB
4	3	Henrique Caetano Nascimento	Brazil	11.85	AR
5	6	David Dzhatiev	Neutral Paralympic Athletes	12.06	
6	9	Ivan Tetiukhin	Ukraine	12.07	PB
7	2	Maximiliano Villa	Argentina	12.21	SB
8	1	Fabio Bordignon	Brazil	12.41 (.401)	
9	8	Hernan Barreto	Argentina	12.41 (.401)	SB
				Wind: +0.3 m/s	

=== T36 ===
The T36 category is for ambulant athletes with cerebral palsy. These athletes do not have the capacity to remain still and they show involuntary movements with all four limbs affected. They usually walk without assistive devices.

The final in this classification took place on 7 September 2024, at 10:50:

Rank	Lane	Athlete	Nation	Time	Notes
1st place, gold medalist(s)	3	James Turner	Australia	11.85	PR, SB
2nd place, silver medalist(s)	7	Alexis Chávez	Argentina	11.88 (.871)	
3rd place, bronze medalist(s)	6	Yang Yifei	China	11.88 (.877)	=SB
4	5	Evgenii Torsunov	Neutral Paralympic Athletes	11.95	SB
5	4	Deng Peicheng	China	12.00	
6	9	William Stedman	New Zealand	12.35	PB
7	8	Aser Ramos	Brazil	12.38	SB
8	2	Fakhr Thelaidjia	Algeria	12.56	PB
				Wind: +0.8 m/s	

=== T37 ===
The T37 category is for ambulant athletes with cerebral palsy. These athletes have movement and coordination problems on one half of their body. They have good ability in their dominant side of their body (ie hemiplegia).

The final in this classification took place on 30 August 2024, at 19:23:

Rank	Lane	Name	Nationality	Time	Notes
1st place, gold medalist(s)	6	Ricardo Mendonça	Brazil	11.07	=SB
2nd place, silver medalist(s)	5	Saptoyogo Purnomo	Indonesia	11.26	AR
3rd place, bronze medalist(s)	7	Andrei Vdovin	Neutral Paralympic Athletes	11.41	SB
4	3	Christian Luiz da Costa	Brazil	11.45	
5	4	Edson Pinheiro	Brazil	11.47	
6	8	Ali Alnakhli	Saudi Arabia	11.58	SB
7	2	Vladyslav Zahrebelnyi	Ukraine	11.84	
8	9	Mykola Raiskyi	Ukraine	11.94	
				Wind: +0.7 m/s	

=== T38 ===
The T38 category is for ambulant athletes with cerebral palsy. T38 athletes have the mildest form of impairment caused by cerebral palsy, often in only one limb, and not affecting the ability to run, walk or jump freely, although impairing performance. T38 athletes may suffer minor co-ordination difficulties.

The final in this classification took place on 31 August 2024, at 19:35:

Rank	Lane	Name	Nationality	Time	Notes
1st place, gold medalist(s)	4	Jaydin Blackwell	United States	10.64	WR
2nd place, silver medalist(s)	6	Ryan Medrano	United States	10.97	PB
3rd place, bronze medalist(s)	9	Juan Campas	Colombia	10.99	PB
4	5	Thomas Young	Great Britain	11.00	
5	7	Dimitri Jozwicki	France	11.13	
6	2	Santiago Solís	Colombia	11.17	PB
7	8	Nick Mayhugh	United States	11.37	
8	1	Ali Al-Rikabi	Iraq	11.48	PB
9	3	Zhou Peng	China	11.94	
				Wind: +0.9 m/s	

=== T44 ===
The T44 category is for athletes who have a single below knee amputation or who can walk with moderately reduced function in one or both legs.

The final in this classification took place on 1 September 2024, at 19:30:

Rank	Lane	Name	Nationality	Time	Notes
1st place, gold medalist(s)	4	Mpumelelo Mhlongo	South Africa	11.12	SB
2nd place, silver medalist(s)	7	Yamel Luis Vives Suares	Cuba	11.20	AR
3rd place, bronze medalist(s)	3	Eddy Bernard	Malaysia	11.58	AR
4	8	Felicien Siapo	France	11.66	AR
5	5	Indika Gamage	Sri Lanka	11.67	SB
6	2	Nour Alsana	Saudi Arabia	11.70	PB
7	9	Karim Ramadan	Egypt	11.96	
8	1	Marco Cicchetti	Italy	12.03	SB
				Wind: -0.7 m/s	

=== T47 ===
The T47 category is for athletes who have a single below elbow or wrist amputation or similar disability, with normal function in both legs.

The final in this classification took place on 30 August 2024, at 19:30:

Rank	Lane	Name	Nationality	Time	Notes
1st place, gold medalist(s)	6	Petrucio Ferreira dos Santos	Brazil	10.68	SB
2nd place, silver medalist(s)	4	Korban Best	United States	10.75	PB
3rd place, bronze medalist(s)	5	Aymane El Haddaoui	Morocco	10.78	
4	3	Wang Hao	China	10.81	SB
5	9	Washington Junior	Brazil	10.86	
6	7	Raciel Gonzalez Isidoria	Cuba	10.93	
6	2	Lucas Sousa Pereira	Brazil	10.93	
8	8	Kudakwashe Chigwedere	Zimbabwe	10.95	
				Wind: +0.2 m/s	

=== T51 ===
The T51 category is for wheelchair athletes having spinal cord injuries, with mild weakness in shoulders, limited ability in straightening elbows and wrist function, and no finger, trunk or leg function.

The final in this classification took place on 6 September 2024, at 21:08:

Rank	Lane	Name	Nationality	Time	Notes
1st place, gold medalist(s)	6	Cody Fournie	Canada	19.63	PR, AR
2nd place, silver medalist(s)	3	Peter Genyn	Belgium	20.47	
3rd place, bronze medalist(s)	2	Toni Piispanen	Finland	21.14	SB
4	5	Mohamed Berrahal	Algeria	21.83	
5	4	Edgar Navarro	Mexico	21.97	
6	7	Roger Habsch	Belgium	22.41	
7	8	Ernesto Fonseca	Costa Rica	24.80	
				Wind: -0.3 m/s	

=== T52 ===
The T52 category is for wheelchair athletes with damage to spinal cord in the higher parts of the back, substantially impaired or no trunk function, and minimal or no leg function. Pushing power comes from elbow extensions, and appears close to normal except for use of modified gloves to compensate for grip.

The final in this classification took place on 6 September 2024, at 11:32:

Rank	Lane	Name	Nationality	Time	Notes
1st place, gold medalist(s)	5	Maxime Carabin	Belgium	16.70	
2nd place, silver medalist(s)	7	Marcus Perrineau-Daley	Great Britain	17.27	
3rd place, bronze medalist(s)	4	Tomoki Sato	Japan	17.44	
4	6	Anthony Bouchard	Canada	17.55	
5	8	Salvador Hernández	Mexico	17.55	
6	3	Leonardo de Jesús Pérez Juárez	Mexico	17.67	
7	2	Tomoya Ito	Japan	17.67	
8	9	Tatsuya Ito	Japan	17.91	
				Wind: +1.6 m/s	

=== T53 ===
The T53 category is for wheelchair athletes with normal use of arms and hands, no or limited trunk function, and no leg function.

The final in this classification took place on 4 September 2024, at 19:14:

Rank	Lane	Name	Nationality	Time	Notes
1st place, gold medalist(s)	4	Abdulrahman Al-Qurashi	Saudi Arabia	14.48	PB
2nd place, silver medalist(s)	5	Pongsakorn Paeyo	Thailand	14.66	SB
3rd place, bronze medalist(s)	7	Ariosvaldo Fernandes	Brazil	15.08	
4	8	Brian Siemann	United States	15.27	
5	6	Pierre Fairbank	France	15.28	
6	9	Pichet Krungget	Thailand	15.38	
7	3	Nidhal Khelifi	Tunisia	15.50	
8	2	Byunghoon Yoo	South Korea	15.92	
				Wind: +0.6 m/s	

=== T54 ===
The T54 category is for wheelchair athletes with no leg function, but near full arm function and reasonable to normal trunk function. Typically this may be caused by a lower spinal cord injury or spinal cord birth defect.

The final in this classification took place on 4 September 2024, at 19:25:

Rank	Lane	Name	Nationality	Time	Notes
1st place, gold medalist(s)	7	Juan Pablo Cervantes Garcia	Mexico	13.74	AR
2nd place, silver medalist(s)	4	Athiwat Paeng-Nuea	Thailand	13.79	
3rd place, bronze medalist(s)	6	Leo-Pekka Tahti	Finland	13.86	
4	8	Hu Yang	China	14.14	
5	5	Mamudo Balde	Portugal	14.19	
6	3	Zhang Ying	China	14.28	
7	9	Luke Bailey	Australia	14.39	
8	2	Phiphatphong Sianglam	Thailand	14.84	
				Wind: -0.2 m/s	

=== T63 ===
The T63 Category is for athletes with single through knee or above knee limb deficiency competing with a prosthesis.

The final in this classification took place on 2 September 2024, at 20:37:

Rank	Lane	Name	Nationality	Time	Notes
1st place, gold medalist(s)	8	Ezra Frech	United States	12.06	PB
2nd place, silver medalist(s)	4	Daniel Wagner	Denmark	12.08	PB
3rd place, bronze medalist(s)	3	Vinícius Gonçalves Rodrigues	Brazil	12.10	SB
4	6	Leon Schaefer	Germany	12.12	
5	5	Puseletso Mabote	South Africa	12.16	
6	7	Joel de Jong	Netherlands	12.20	
7	2	Desmond Jackson	United States	12.49	
8	9	Partin	Indonesia	12.51	
				Wind: +0.1 m/s	

=== T64 ===
The T64 Category is for athletes with unilateral below knee limb deficiency competing with a prosthesis.

The final in this classification took place on 2 September 2024, at 21:35:

Rank	Lane	Name	Nationality	Time	Notes
1st place, gold medalist(s)	7	Sherman Guity	Costa Rica	10.65	PR, PB
2nd place, silver medalist(s)	5	Maxcel Amo Manu	Italy	10.76	
3rd place, bronze medalist(s)	6	Felix Streng	Germany	10.77	
4	4	Johannes Floors	Germany	10.85	
5	3	Jonnie Peacock	Great Britain	10.91	
6	8	Hunter Woodhall	United States	10.96	
7	9	Olivier Hendriks	Netherlands	11.15	
8	2	Alan Oliveria Becker Fonteles	Brazil	11.22	
				Wind: +0.2 m/s	
