= 2025 World Para Athletics Championships – Men's 100 metres =

The men's 100 metres events at the 2025 World Para Athletics Championships were held at the Jawaharlal Nehru Stadium, Delhi in New Delhi.

== Medalists ==
Event	Gold	Silver	Bronze
T11	Athanasios Ghavelas; Greece	Ananias Shikongo; Namibia	Di Dongdong; China
T12	Salum Ageze Kashafali; Norway	Ryutaro Kuno; Japan	Kesley Teodoro; Brazil
T13	Shuta Kawakami; Japan	Chad Perris; Australia	Fabrício Júnior Barros Ferreira; Brazil
T34	Chaiwat Rattana; Thailand	Rheed McCracken; Australia	Mohamad Othman; United Arab Emirates
T35	Artem Kalashian; Neutral Paralympic Athletes	David Dzhatiev; Neutral Paralympic Athletes	Dmitrii Safronov; Neutral Paralympic Athletes
T36	Kirill Glazyrin; Neutral Paralympic Athletes	Deng Peicheng; China	Yang Yifei; China
T37	Ricardo Gomes de Mendonça; Brazil	Christian Gabriel Costa; Brazil	Saptoyogo Purnomo; Indonesia
T38	Jaydin Blackwell; United States	Ryan Medrano; United States	Thomas Young; Great Britain
T44	Naif Almasrahi; Saudi Arabia	Matheus de Lima; Brazil	Marco Cicchetti; Italy
T47	Petrúcio Ferreira; Brazil	Shi Kangjun; China	Aymane El Haddaoui; Morocco
T51	Peter Genyn; Belgium	Roger Habsch; Belgium	Edgar Navarro; Mexico
T52	Anthony Bouchard; Canada	Tomoki Sato; Japan	Fabian Blum; Switzerland
T53	Pongsakorn Paeyo; Thailand	Abdulrahman Al-Qurashi; Saudi Arabia	Yoo Byung-hoon; South Korea
T54	Athiwat Paeng-nuea; Thailand	Hu Yang; China	Mamudo Balde; Portugal
T63	Puseletso Mabote; South Africa	Partin; Indonesia	Daniel Wagner; Denmark
T64	Felix Streng; Germany	Johannes Floors; Germany	Sherman Guity; Costa Rica
T71	Artur Krzyzek; Poland	Vinicius Augusto Cabral; Brazil	—N/a
T72	Carlo Calcagni; Italy	João Matos Cunha; Brazil	Finlay Menzies; Great Britain

== T11 ==
Final

The event took place on 3 October.

Rank	Lane	Name	Nationality	Time	Notes
1st place, gold medalist(s)	3	Athanasios Ghavelas	Greece	10.96	
2nd place, silver medalist(s)	5	Ananias Shikongo	Namibia	11.00	AF
3rd place, bronze medalist(s)	7	Di Dongdong	China	11.11	SB
4	1	Marcel Boettger	Germany	11.13	PB
				Wind: (+0.5 m/s)	

Semifinals

The event took place on 2 October. Qualification: First 1 in each heat (Q) and the next 2 fastest (q) advance to the Final

Rank	Heat	Lane	Name	Nationality	Time	Notes
1	2	3	Athanasios Ghavelas	Greece	11.03	Q
2	1	1	Ananias Shikongo	Namibia	11.08	Q, AF
3	1	7	Di Dongdong	China	11.13	q, SB
4	2	5	Marcel Boettger	Germany	11.20	q, PB
5	1	3	Enderson Santos	Venezuela	11.22	
6	2	7	Timothée Adolphe	France	11.25	
7	1	5	George Quarcoo	Canada	11.42	
8	2	1	Eduardo Uceda Novas	Spain	11.50	
				Wind: (+0.9 m/s), (+0.5 m/s)		

Round 1

The event took place on 2 October. Qualification: First 1 in each heat (Q) and the next 4 fastest (q) advance to the Semi-Final

Rank	Heat	Lane	Name	Nationality	Time	Notes
1	3	5	Athanasios Ghavelas	Greece	11.01	Q
2	4	5	George Quarcoo	Canada	11.14	Q, PB
3	1	7	Enderson Santos	Venezuela	11.17	Q, PB
4	4	7	Timothée Adolphe	France	11.23	q
5	1	5	Di Dongdong	China	11.26	q, SB
6	2	5	Marcel Boettger	Germany	11.29	Q
7	2	7	Ananias Shikongo	Namibia	11.31	q, SB
8	3	3	Eduardo Uceda Novas	Spain	11.43	q
9	2	3	Chen Shichang	China	11.51	SB
10	4	3	Chris Kinda	Namibia	11.81	SB
11	1	3	Alfred Bernardo	Namibia	12.25	SB
	3	7	Ye Tao	China	DNS	
				Wind: (+0.7 m/s), (−1.0 m/s), (+0.2 m/s), (−0.8 m/s)		

== T12 ==
Final

The event took place on 28 September.

Rank	Lane	Name	Nationality	Time	Notes
1st place, gold medalist(s)	5	Salum Ageze Kashafali	Norway	10.42	WR
2nd place, silver medalist(s)	3	Ryutaro Kuno	Japan	11.01	
3rd place, bronze medalist(s)	7	Kesley Teodoro	Brazil	11.04	
4	1	Nathan Jason	Australia	11.11	
				Wind: (+0.3 m/s)	

Semifinals

The event took place on 27 September. Qualification: First 1 in each heat (Q) and the next 2 fastest (q) advance to the Final

Rank	Heat	Lane	Name	Nationality	Time	Notes
1	1	5	Salum Ageze Kashafali	Norway	10.43	Q, =WR
2	2	5	Ryutaro Kuno	Japan	10.91	Q, =AS
3	2	3	Kesley Teodoro	Brazil	11.00	q
4	1	7	Nathan Jason	Australia	11.04	q
5	2	1	Mahdi Afri	Morocco	11.09	SB
6	1	3	Joeferson Marinho de Oliveira	Brazil	11.16	
7	1	1	Daiki Ishiyama	Japan	11.41	
8	2	7	Roman Tarasov	Neutral Paralympic Athletes	11.64	
				Wind: (+1.0 m/s), (+0.9 m/s)		

Round 1

The event took place on 27 September. Qualification: First 1 in each heat (Q) and the next 4 fastest (q) advance to the Semi-Final

Rank	Heat	Lane	Name	Nationality	Time	Notes
1	3	5	Salum Ageze Kashafali	Norway	10.77	Q
2	2	3	Ryutaro Kuno	Japan	10.94	Q, SB
3	1	5	Kesley Teodoro	Brazil	11.06	Q
4	1	7	Nathan Jason	Australia	11.06	q
5	4	3	Joeferson Marinho de Oliveira	Brazil	11.08	Q
6	2	1	Roman Tarasov	Neutral Paralympic Athletes	11.15	q
7	2	5	Mahdi Afri	Morocco	11.29	q
8	4	7	Daiki Ishiyama	Japan	11.41	q
9	1	3	Ali Enes Kaya	Turkey	11.45	PB
10	4	5	Ihar Sauchuk	Neutral Paralympic Athletes	11.78	
11	3	7	Diego Ruiz Garcia	Spain	11.86	SB
12	2	7	Enric Quintanilla Soriano	Spain	11.95	
	3	3	David Johnson	Canada	DNS	
				Wind: (+0.2 m/s), (−0.5 m/s), (−0.4 m/s), (±0.0 m/s)		

== T13 ==
Final

The event took place on 30 September.

Rank	Lane	Name	Nationality	Time	Notes
1st place, gold medalist(s)	4	Shuta Kawakami	Japan	10.91	
2nd place, silver medalist(s)	6	Chad Perris	Australia	10.96	
3rd place, bronze medalist(s)	7	Fabrício Júnior Barros Ferreira	Brazil	11.00	
4	8	Axel Zorzi	France	11.05	
5	5	Vegard Dragsund Sverd	Norway	11.08	
6	2	Max Marzillier	Germany	11.19	SB
7	9	Egor Gostinskii	Neutral Paralympic Athletes	11.31	
8	3	Joan Sirera Molina	Spain	11.36	
				Wind: (−1.3 m/s)	

Round 1

The event took place on 29 September. Qualification: First 3 in each heat (Q) and the next 2 fastest (q) advance to the Final

Rank	Heat	Lane	Name	Nationality	Time	Notes
1	2	6	Chad Perris	Australia	10.86	Q
2	1	8	Vegard Dragsund Sverd	Norway	10.87	Q, PB
3	1	3	Shuta Kawakami	Japan	11.01	Q
4	2	2	Fabrício Júnior Barros Ferreira	Brazil	11.02	Q
5	1	5	Axel Zorzi	France	11.08	Q
6	1	6	Max Marzillier	Germany	11.22	q, SB
7	2	5	Joan Sirera Molina	Spain	11.27	Q
8	2	3	Egor Gostinskii	Neutral Paralympic Athletes	11.38	q
9	2	4	Bounphet Thepthida	Laos	11.50	SB
10	2	8	Jairus Ongeta Okora	Kenya	11.53	
11	1	7	James Tirado	Australia	11.93	
	1	4	York Lázaro	Cuba	DNS	
	2	7	Isaac Jean-Paul	United States	DNS	
				Wind: (−1.2 m/s), (−0.6 m/s)		

== T34 ==
Final

The event took place on 1 October

Rank	Lane	Name	Nationality	Time	Notes
1st place, gold medalist(s)	5	Chaiwat Rattana	Thailand	15.00	
2nd place, silver medalist(s)	4	Rheed McCracken	Australia	15.04	
3rd place, bronze medalist(s)	7	Mohamad Othman	United Arab Emirates	15.04	
4	6	Roberto Michel	Mauritius	15.13	
5	9	Ali Radi Arshid	Qatar	15.20	=PB
6	3	Austin Smeenk	Canada	15.32	
7	2	Ahmed Nawad	United Arab Emirates	15.59	
	8	Walid Ktila	Tunisia	DQ	
				Wind: (−0.8 m/s)	

Round 1

The event took place on 1 October. Qualification: First 3 in each heat (Q) and the next 2 fastest (q) advance to the Final

Rank	Heat	Lane	Name	Nationality	Time	Notes
1	1	4	Chaiwat Rattana	Thailand	14.71	Q, CR
2	1	3	Roberto Michel	Mauritius	14.93	Q, PB
3	2	5	Rheed McCracken	Australia	14.95	Q
4	1	6	Walid Ktila	Tunisia	15.02	Q
5	2	7	Mohamad Othman	United Arab Emirates	15.16	Q
6	2	4	Austin Smeenk	Canada	15.26	Q
7	1	5	Ali Radi Arshid	Qatar	15.41	q, SB
8	1	7	Ahmed Nawad	United Arab Emirates	15.57	q
9	2	6	Henry Manni	Finland	15.63	
10	2	3	Wang Yang	China	15.75	SB
11	2	8	Mohammed Rashid Al-Kubaisi	Qatar	16.08	PB
12	1	8	Ebrahim Almoadhen	Bahrain	20.51	SB
				Wind: (+1.3 m/s), (−0.3 m/s)		

== T35 ==
Final

The event took place on 4 October.

Rank	Lane	Name	Nationality	Time	Notes
1st place, gold medalist(s)	4	Artem Kalashian	Neutral Paralympic Athletes	11.55	CR
2nd place, silver medalist(s)	7	David Dzhatiev	Neutral Paralympic Athletes	11.61	PB
3rd place, bronze medalist(s)	6	Dmitrii Safronov	Neutral Paralympic Athletes	11.70	SB
4	5	Henrique Caetano Nascimento	Brazil	11.75	
5	3	Maximiliano Villa	Argentina	12.22	
6	8	Ivan Tetiukhin	Ukraine	12.33	
7	9	Jordan Fairweather	Australia	12.92	
8	2	Jack Netting	Australia	13.08	
				Wind: (−0.8 m/s)	

Round 1

The event took place on 3 October. Qualification: First 3 in each heat (Q) and the next 2 fastest (q) advance to the Final

Rank	Heat	Lane	Name	Nationality	Time	Notes
1	2	6	Henrique Caetano Nascimento	Brazil	11.66	Q, CR
2	2	5	Artem Kalashian	Neutral Paralympic Athletes	11.69	Q, PB
3	1	7	Dmitrii Safronov	Neutral Paralympic Athletes	11.77	Q
4	2	3	Ivan Tetiukhin	Ukraine	11.88	Q, PB
5	1	3	David Dzhatiev	Neutral Paralympic Athletes	11.92	Q, SB
6	1	6	Maximiliano Villa	Argentina	12.05	Q, PB
7	2	4	Jackson Love	Australia	12.34	q, OC
8	2	7	Jordan Fairweather	Australia	12.78	q, PB
9	1	4	Jack Netting	Australia	12.89	R, PB
10	2	8	Bao Chui Yiu	Hong Kong	14.63	
	1	5	Ihor Tsvietov	Ukraine	DNS	
				Wind: (+0.9 m/s), (+1.0 m/s)		

== T36 ==
Final

The event took place on 3 October

Rank	Lane	Name	Nationality	Time	Notes
1st place, gold medalist(s)	6	Kirill Glazyrin	Neutral Paralympic Athletes	11.73	ER
2nd place, silver medalist(s)	7	Deng Peicheng	China	11.77	AS
3rd place, bronze medalist(s)	3	Yang Yifei	China	12.03	SB
4	4	Alexis Chávez	Argentina	12.05	=SB
5	8	Mokhtar Didane	Algeria	12.09	
6	9	Evgenii Torsunov	Neutral Paralympic Athletes	12.13	SB
7	5	James Turner	Australia	12.21	
8	2	Takeru Matsumoto	Japan	12.37	
				Wind: (±0.0 m/s)	

Round 1

The event took place on 2 October. Qualification: First 3 in each heat (Q) and the next 2 fastest (q) advance to the Final

Rank	Heat	Lane	Name	Nationality	Time	Notes
1	2	8	James Turner	Australia	11.94	Q
2	1	4	Kirill Glazyrin	Neutral Paralympic Athletes	12.01	Q, PB
3	2	6	Deng Peicheng	China	12.01	Q, SB
4	2	5	Mokhtar Didane	Algeria	12.05	Q, SB
5	2	7	Evgenii Torsunov	Neutral Paralympic Athletes	12.14	q, SB
6	1	3	Alexis Chávez	Argentina	12.16	Q
7	1	7	Yang Yifei	China	12.23	Q, SB
8	1	6	Takeru Matsumoto	Japan	12.40	q
9	1	5	Fakhr Eddine Thelaidjia	Algeria	12.50	PB
10	1	8	Alexander McKillop	Australia	12.60	SB
11	2	3	Taha Al-Harrasi	Oman	12.71	
12	2	4	Izzat Turgunov	Uzbekistan	12.82	SB
	2	2	David Khachaturian	Armenia	DNS	
				Wind: (−1.1 m/s), (−1.0 m/s)		

== T37 ==
Final

The event took place on 28 September.

Rank	Lane	Name	Nationality	Time	Notes
1st place, gold medalist(s)	7	Ricardo Gomes de Mendonça	Brazil	11.16	CR
2nd place, silver medalist(s)	4	Christian Gabriel Costa	Brazil	11.23	PB
3rd place, bronze medalist(s)	6	Saptoyogo Purnomo	Indonesia	11.29	SB
4	5	Ali Alnakhli	Saudi Arabia	11.41	
5	8	Andrey Vdovin	Neutral Paralympic Athletes	11.60	SB
6	2	Chermen Kobesov	Neutral Paralympic Athletes	11.63	
7	9	Rakeshbhai Bhatt	India	11.88	
8	3	Shreyansh Trivedi	India	12.18	
				Wind: (−0.3 m/s)	

Round 1

The event took place on 27 September. Qualification: First 2 in each heat (Q) and the next 2 fastest (q) advance to the Final

Rank	Heat	Lane	Name	Nationality	Time	Notes
1	1	7	Ricardo Gomes de Mendonça	Brazil	11.25	Q, CR
2	1	3	Ali Alnakhli	Saudi Arabia	11.28	Q, PB
3	2	7	Christian Gabriel Costa	Brazil	11.28	Q. PB
4	2	6	Saptoyogo Purnomo	Indonesia	11.32	Q, SB
5	2	8	Chermen Kobesov	Neutral Paralympic Athletes	11.42	q, SB
6	1	6	Rakeshbhai Bhatt	India	11.62	q, PB
7	3	5	Andrey Vdovin	Neutral Paralympic Athletes	11.74	Q, SB
8	1	4	Samuel Allen	Australia	11.80	OC
9	1	8	Anton Feoktistov	Neutral Paralympic Athletes	11.81	PB
10	3	7	Shreyansh Trivedi	India	11.94	Q, PB
11	3	6	Edson Pinheiro	Brazil	11.98	
12	3	8	Liam Kernick	Australia	12.09	PB
13	2	4	Petrus Karuli	Namibia	12.12	PB
14	3	4	Joseph Smit	New Zealand	12.13	SB
15	1	5	Samson Opiyo	Kenya	12.36	
16	3	3	Adonys Rosa	Dominican Republic	12.49	PB
	2	5	Stijn van Bergen	Netherlands	DNS	
				Wind: (+1.3 m/s), (+1.1 m/s), (+1.0 m/s)		

== T38 ==
Final

The event took place on 28 September.

Rank	Lane	Name	Nationality	Time	Notes
1st place, gold medalist(s)	5	Jaydin Blackwell	United States	10.70	CR
2nd place, silver medalist(s)	7	Ryan Medrano	United States	10.90	
3rd place, bronze medalist(s)	8	Thomas Young	Great Britain	10.98	
4	6	Dimitri Jozwicki	France	11.07	
5	2	Santiago Solís	Colombia	11.08	
6	4	Bartosz Sienkiewicz	Poland	11.10	
7	3	Nick Mayhugh	United States	11.21	
8	9	Ullrich Muller	Australia	11.31	
				Wind: (−0.4 m/s)	

Round 1

The event took place on 27 September. Qualification: First 3 in each heat (Q) and the next 2 fastest (q) advance to the Final

Rank	Heat	Lane	Name	Nationality	Time	Notes
1	1	4	Ryan Medrano	United States	10.83	Q, CR
2	1	5	Bartosz Sienkiewicz	Poland	10.87	Q, ER
3	1	8	Thomas Young	Great Britain	10.91	Q, PB
4	2	4	Jaydin Blackwell	United States	10.92	Q
5	2	3	Dimitri Jozwicki	France	11.00	Q
6	1	6	Santiago Solís	Colombia	11.01	q, PB
7	2	6	Nick Mayhugh	United States	11.16	Q
8	1	7	Ullrich Muller	Australia	11.18	q, PB
9	2	5	Shannon Winchester	Australia	11.76	
10	2	7	Jassiel Torres López	Puerto Rico	11.79	PB
11	2	8	Mitchell Prosper	Mauritius	11.98	PB
12	1	3	Elijah Thommen	Switzerland	12.07	
				Wind: (+0.8 m/s), (+1.0 m/s)		

== T44 ==
Final

The event took place on 30 September.

Rank	Lane	Name	Nationality	Time	Notes
1st place, gold medalist(s)	5	Naif Almasrahi	Saudi Arabia	10.94	WR
2nd place, silver medalist(s)	7	Matheus de Lima	Brazil	10.99	AM
3rd place, bronze medalist(s)	4	Marco Cicchetti	Italy	11.46	
4	6	Pavlo Kaplun	Ukraine	11.49	
5	8	Dzmitry Bartashevich	Neutral Paralympic Athletes	11.54	PB
6	9	Dušan Knežević	Serbia	11.61	PB
7	3	Felicien Siapo	France	11.75	
	2	Karim Ramadan	Egypt	DQ	
				Wind: (+0.2 m/s)	

Round 1

The event took place on 29 September. Qualification: First 3 in each heat (Q) and the next 2 fastest (q) advance to the Final

Rank	Heat	Lane	Name	Nationality	Time	Notes
1	1	6	Naif Almasrahi	Saudi Arabia	11.04	Q, AS
2	2	2	Matheus de Lima	Brazil	11.36	Q, SB
3	1	5	Marco Cicchetti	Italy	11.43	Q, ER
4	2	3	Pavlo Kaplun	Ukraine	11.45	Q, PB
5	1	7	Dzmitry Bartashevich	Neutral Paralympic Athletes	11.63	Q, PB
6	2	9	Felicien Siapo	France	11.74	Q
7	1	2	Dušan Knežević	Serbia	11.75	q, PB
8	1	8	Karim Ramadan	Egypt	11.81	q, SB
9	1	4	Eddy Bernard	Malaysia	11.82	SB
10	2	7	Indika Gamage	Sri Lanka	11.86	
11	2	5	Huang Ruihua	China	11.92	
12	1	3	Andrii Kondratiuk	Ukraine	11.99	PB
13	2	4	Nour Alsana	Saudi Arabia	12.06	
14	2	6	Denzel Namene	Namibia	12.37	SB
15	2	8	Michael Shippley	Australia	12.68	OC
				Wind: (±0.0 m/s), (−0.1 m/s)		

== T47 ==
Final

The event took place on 27 September.

Rank	Lane	Name	Nationality	Time	Notes
1st place, gold medalist(s)	7	Petrúcio Ferreira	Brazil	10.66	
2nd place, silver medalist(s)	5	Shi Kangjun	China	10.68	PB
3rd place, bronze medalist(s)	9	Aymane El Haddaoui	Morocco	10.70	SB
4	4	Thomaz Ruan de Moraes	Brazil	10.82	
5	6	Korban Best	United States	10.84	SB
6	8	Wang Hao	China	10.92	SB
7	3	Michał Derus	Poland	10.96	SB
8	2	Collen Mahlalela	South Africa	11.21	
				Wind: (+0.1 m/s)	

Round 1

The event took place on 27 September. Qualification: First 2 in each heat (Q) and the next 2 fastest (q) advance to the Final

Rank	Heat	Lane	Name	Nationality	Time	Notes
1	2	8	Thomaz Ruan de Moraes	Brazil	10.77	Q, SB
2	2	4	Shi Kangjun	China	10.83	Q, PB
3	1	5	Petrúcio Ferreira	Brazil	10.90	Q
4	1	6	Wang Hao	China	10.98	Q, SB
5	3	7	Korban Best	United States	11.01	Q
6	2	3	Aymane El Haddaoui	Morocco	11.07	q
7	3	6	Michał Derus	Poland	11.11	Q
8	1	8	Collen Mahlalela	South Africa	11.18	q, PB
9	3	5	Jaydon Page	Australia	11.21	
10	1	7	Bradley Murere	Namibia	11.30	SB
11	2	6	Pere Antoni Gomila	Spain	11.52	
12	3	4	Nur Ferry Pradana	Indonesia	11.67	
13	2	5	Buddika Fernando	Sri Lanka	11.81	
14	3	3	Antonio Santos	Portugal	11.83	
15	2	7	Md Imtiaj Ahammed	Bangladesh	12.46	
16	1	3	Khandkur Md Abu Sayed	Bangladesh	12.75	PB
	1	4	Kudakwashe Chigwedere	Zimbabwe	DNS	
	3	8	Bouba Ibrahim Bouba	Cameroon	DNS	
				Wind: (+0.6 m/s), (+0.3 m/s), (−0.3 m/s)		

== T51 ==
Final

The event took place on 4 October

Rank	Lane	Name	Nationality	Time	Notes
1st place, gold medalist(s)	6	Peter Genyn	Belgium	20.19	CR
2nd place, silver medalist(s)	4	Roger Habsch	Belgium	20.44	
3rd place, bronze medalist(s)	7	Edgar Navarro	Mexico	22.23	SB
4	5	Hélder Mestre	Portugal	24.00	
5	3	Mohamed Alshook	Bahrain	24.59	SB
				Wind: (−0.2 m/s)	

== T52 ==
Final

The event took place on 4 October

Rank	Lane	Name	Nationality	Time	Notes
1st place, gold medalist(s)	5	Anthony Bouchard	Canada	16.95	
2nd place, silver medalist(s)	7	Tomoki Sato	Japan	17.07	
3rd place, bronze medalist(s)	8	Fabian Blum	Switzerland	17.15	
4	3	Sam McIntosh	Australia	17.25	OC
5	2	Tatsuya Ito	Japan	17.34	=SB
6	4	Salvador Hernández	Mexico	17.46	
7	9	Leonardo de Jesús Pérez Juárez	Mexico	18.08	
	6	Marcus Perrineau-Daley	Great Britain	DQ	
				Wind: (+0.8 m/s)	

.

Round 1

The event took place on 4 October. Qualification: First 3 in each heat (Q) and the next 2 fastest (q) advance to the Final

Rank	Heat	Lane	Name	Nationality	Time	Notes
1	2	4	Anthony Bouchard	Canada	16.78	CR
2	2	5	Tomoki Sato	Japan	16.79	Q
3	1	4	Marcus Perrineau-Daley	Great Britain	16.97	Q
4	2	6	Fabian Blum	Switzerland	17.36	Q
5	1	6	Salvador Hernández	Mexico	17.38	Q
6	1	7	Sam McIntosh	Australia	17.41	Q
7	2	7	Tatsuya Ito	Japan	17.48	q
8	2	3	Leonardo de Jesús Pérez Juárez	Mexico	17.72	q
9	1	8	Tomoya Ito	Japan	17.74	SB
10	2	8	Jonathan Thorsell	Sweden	18.68	PB
11	1	5	Jeong Jong-dae	South Korea	18.84	SB
12	1	3	Jerrold Mangliwan	Philippines	19.56	SB
				Wind: (+0.8 m/s), (+1.5 m/s)		

== T53 ==
Final

The event took place on 2 October.

Rank	Lane	Name	Nationality	Time	Notes
1st place, gold medalist(s)	5	Pongsakorn Paeyo	Thailand	14.55	
2nd place, silver medalist(s)	6	Abdulrahman Al-Qurashi	Saudi Arabia	14.65	SB
3rd place, bronze medalist(s)	2	Yoo Byung-hoon	South Korea	15.51	
4	9	Masaberee Arsae	Thailand	15.55	
5	8	Vitalii Gritsenko	Neutral Paralympic Athletes	15.59	
6	3	Bob Hunt	United States	15.61	
7	4	Mohamed Nidhal Khelifi	Tunisia	15.64	
8	7	Pierre Fairbank	France	15.67	
				Wind: (+0.7 m/s)	

Round 1

The event took place on 2 October. Qualification: First 3 in each heat (Q) and the next 2 fastest (q) advance to the Final

Rank	Heat	Lane	Name	Nationality	Time	Notes
1	1	4	Pongsakorn Paeyo	Thailand	14.55	Q
2	2	4	Abdulrahman Al-Qurashi	Saudi Arabia	15.04	Q
3	1	3	Pierre Fairbank	France	15.13	Q, SB
4	2	3	Mohamed Nidhal Khelifi	Tunisia	15.35	Q, SB
5	1	5	Vitalii Gritsenko	Neutral Paralympic Athletes	15.36	Q, SB
6	1	7	Yoo Byung-hoon	South Korea	15.49	q, SB
7	2	5	Bob Hunt	United States	15.53	Q
8	2	6	Masaberee Arsae	Thailand	15.68	q
9	2	8	Purevtsog Enkhmanlai	Mongolia	15.96	SB
10	2	7	Johannes Balbaert	Belgium	16.25	
11	1	6	Maxime Carabin	Belgium	17.33	
				Wind: (±0.0 m/s), (−0.8 m/s)		

== T54 ==
Final

The event took place on 3 October.

Rank	Lane	Name	Nationality	Time	Notes
1st place, gold medalist(s)	5	Athiwat Paeng-nuea	Thailand	13.66	
2nd place, silver medalist(s)	6	Hu Yang	China	13.81	PB
3rd place, bronze medalist(s)	4	Mamudo Balde	Portugal	13.86	
4	7	Albaraa Al-Qarni	Saudi Arabia	13.98	PB
5	2	Zhang Ying	China	14.08	SB
6	3	Jamaan Alzahrani	Saudi Arabia	14.13	
7	8	Esa-Pekka Mattila	Finland	14.15	SB
8	9	Phiphatphong Sianglam	Thailand	14.38	SB
				Wind: (+0.7 m/s)	

Round 1

The event took place on 3 October. Qualification: First 3 in each heat (Q) and the next 2 fastest (q) advance to the Final.

Rank	Heat	Lane	Name	Nationality	Time	Notes
1	1	6	Mamudo Balde	Portugal	13.76	Q
2	2	4	Athiwat Paeng-nuea	Thailand	14.09	Q
3	2	2	Hu Yang	China	14.18	Q, SB
4	1	7	Albaraa Al-Qarni	Saudi Arabia	14.26	Q
5	1	8	Esa-Pekka Mattila	Finland	14.26	Q, SB
6	2	7	Jamaan Alzahrani	Saudi Arabia	14.46	Q
7	1	4	Zhang Ying	China	14.49	q, SB
8	1	2	Phiphatphong Sianglam	Thailand	14.68	q
9	2	3	Jaenal Aripin	Indonesia	14.69	SB
10	2	5	Luke Bailey	Australia	14.73	
11	2	6	Gabriel Sosa	Argentina	15.05	
12	2	8	Smbat Karapetyan	Armenia	16.82	SB
13	1	3	Arman Sargsyan	Armenia	19.03	PB
	1	5	Juan Pablo Cervantes García	Mexico	DNS	
				Wind: (+0.1 m/s), (−0.5 m/s)		

== T63 ==
Final

The event took place on 5 October.

Rank	Lane	Name	Nationality	Class	Time	Notes
1st place, gold medalist(s)	7	Puseletso Mabote	South Africa	T63	12.03	CR
2nd place, silver medalist(s)	4	Partin	Indonesia	T42	12.26	SB
3rd place, bronze medalist(s)	8	Daniel Wagner	Denmark	T63	12.28	SB
4	6	Desmond Jackson	United States	T63	12.35	
5	9	Ezra Frech	United States	T63	12.52	
6	3	Phalathip Khamta	Thailand	T63	12.59	AS
7	2	Hajime Kondo	Japan	T63	13.29	
	5	Joel de Jong	Netherlands	T63	DQ	
				Wind: (−0.3 m/s)		

Round 1

The event took place on 5 October. Qualification: First 3 in each heat (Q) and the next 2 fastest (q) advance to the Final.

Rank	Heat	Lane	Name	Nationality	Time	Notes
1	1	5	Puseletso Mabote	South Africa	12.06	Q, CR
2	1	7	Joel de Jong	Netherlands	12.20	Q
3	2	6	Partin	Indonesia	12.32	Q, SB
4	2	5	Desmond Jackson	United States	12.35	Q, SB
5	1	4	Daniel Wagner	Denmark	12.42	Q, SB
6	1	6	Ezra Frech	United States	12.51	q, SB
7	2	4	Phalathip Khamta	Thailand	12.63	Q, PB
8	1	3	Hajime Kondo	Japan	13.24	q
9	2	3	Ilias Benkaddour	Belgium	15.14	
10	2	7	Léon Schäfer	Germany	23.51	
				Wind: (+1.0 m/s), (+1.4 m/s)		

== T64 ==
Final

The event took place on 30 September.

Rank	Lane	Name	Nationality	Class	Time	Notes
1st place, gold medalist(s)	7	Felix Streng	Germany	T64	10.73	
2nd place, silver medalist(s)	4	Johannes Floors	Germany	T62	10.75	
3rd place, bronze medalist(s)	6	Sherman Guity	Costa Rica	T64	10.93	
4	5	Alan Oliveira Becker	Brazil	T62	11.05	SB
5	8	Olivier Hendriks	Netherlands	T62	11.07	PB
6	9	Jarryd Wallace	United States	T64	11.23	
7	2	Dan Gladman	Great Britain	T64	11.39	
	3	Maxcel Amo Manu	Italy	T64	DQ	
				Wind: (±0.0 m/s)		

Round 1

The event took place on 29 September. Qualification: First 2 in each heat (Q) and the next 2 fastest (q) advance to the Final

Rank	Heat	Lane	Name	Nationality	Class	Time	Notes
1	3	5	Johannes Floors	Germany	T62	10.71	Q
2	1	5	Sherman Guity	Costa Rica	T64	10.79	Q, SB
3	2	4	Felix Streng	Germany	T64	10.79	Q
4	3	3	Alan Oliveira Becker	Brazil	T62	11.06	Q, SB
5	2	7	Olivier Hendriks	Netherlands	T62	11.09	Q, PB
6	1	7	Maxcel Amo Manu	Italy	T64	11.26	Q
7	2	3	Jarryd Wallace	United States	T64	11.28	q
8	3	6	Dan Gladman	Great Britain	T64	11.30	q, PB
9	2	6	Francesco Loragno	Italy	T64	11.38	PB
10	3	7	Jonathan Gore	United States	T64	11.42	
11	1	6	Wallison André Fortes	Brazil	T64	11.50	
12	2	5	Petr Mikhalkov	Neutral Paralympic Athletes	T64	11.57	
13	1	8	Levi Vloet	Netherlands	T64	11.58	
14	3	4	Jesús Castillo	Peru	T64	11.67	
15	1	3	Mitchell Joynt	New Zealand	T64	11.92	
16	1	4	Denpoom Kotcharang	Thailand	T64	11.96	SB
17	2	8	Konstantinos Tourkochoritis	Greece	T62	12.03	
				Wind: (−0.2 m/s), (−0.5 m/s), (−0.4 m/s)			

== T71 ==
Final

The event took place on 27 September.

Rank	Lane	Name	Nationality	Time	Notes
1st place, gold medalist(s)	5	Artur Krzyzek	Poland	21.19	
2nd place, silver medalist(s)	6	Vinicius Augusto Cabral	Brazil	22.43	
3	7	Ioannis Avramidis	Greece	25.25	
4	4	Nejdet Çetin	Turkey	25.52	PB
				Wind: (−0.2 m/s)	

== T72 ==
Final

The event took place on 30 September.

Rank	Lane	Name	Nationality	Time	Notes
1st place, gold medalist(s)	5	Carlo Calcagni	Italy	14.80	
2nd place, silver medalist(s)	6	João Matos Cunha	Brazil	15.76	
3rd place, bronze medalist(s)	7	Finlay Menzies	Great Britain	16.29	PB
4	8	Wojciech Kukiełka	Poland	17.18	
5	3	Vinicius Marques Krieger Quintino	Brazil	17.37	
6	2	Igor Markov	Lithuania	17.45	
7	4	Deividas Podobajevas	Lithuania	17.63	
8	9	Arturas Plodunovas	Lithuania	18.49	
				Wind: (−0.7 m/s)	

Round 1

The event took place on 30 September. Qualification: First 3 in each heat (Q) and the next 2 fastest (q) advance to the Final

Rank	Heat	Lane	Name	Nationality	Time	Notes
1	1	5	Carlo Calcagni	Italy	14.65	Q, WR
2	2	5	João Matos Cunha	Brazil	15.33	Q, AM
3	2	3	Finlay Menzies	Great Britain	16.38	PB
4	2	6	Wojciech Kukiełka	Poland	16.83	Q, SB
5	1	4	Deividas Podobajevas	Lithuania	17.37	Q
6	2	4	Igor Markov	Lithuania	17.41	q, PB
7	1	7	Vinicius Marques Krieger Quintino	Brazil	17.89	Q
8	1	6	Arturas Plodunovas	Lithuania	18.16	q, PB
9	1	3	Piotr Siejwa	Poland	18.22	
10	2	7	Axel Colling	Sweden	18.59	
				Wind: (+0.2 m/s), (−0.7 m/s)		
