= Athletics at the 2022 Asian Para Games – Men's 100 metres =

Men's 100 metres at the 2022 Asian Para Games
- Venue: Yellow Dragon Sports Center
- Location: Hangzhou, China
- Dates: 23 – 27 October
- Competitors: 122 from 32 nations

The Men's 100m athletics events for the 2022 Asian Para Games took place at the Yellow Dragon Sports Center from 23 to 27 October, 2023. A total of 15 events were contested over this distance.

== Schedule ==
R	Round 1	F	Final

Date	Mon 23		Tue 24		Wed 25		Thu 26		Fri 27		Sat 28	
Event	M	E	M	E	M	E	M	E	M	E	M	E
T11 100m	R		F									
T12 100m	R	F										
T13 100m		F										
T34 100m		F										
T35 100m							F					
T36 100m							R		F			
T37 100m							F					
T38 100m							F					
T44 100m				F								
T47 100m					R			F				
T52 100m				F								
T53 100m				F								
T54 100m				R	F							
T63 100m										F		
T64 100m								F				

== Results ==
=== T11 ===
==== Records ====
Prior to this competition, the existing world, Asian and Games records were as follows.

World Record	(Greece) Athanasios Ghavelas	10.82	(Japan) Tokyo	September 2, 2021
Asian Record	(China) Di Dongdong	11.03	(Japan) Tokyo	September 2, 2021
Games Record	(Thailand) Peerapon Watbok	11.44	(Indonesia) Jakarta	October 10, 2018

==== Round 1 ====
Round 1 held on 23 October 2023.

Rank	Heat	Lane	Name	Nationality	Time	Notes
1	3	3	Di Dongdong	China	11.14	Q, GR
2	2	7	Zhao Pingan	China	11.44	Q, PB
3	1	5	Ye Tao	China	11.53	Q
4	2	5	Ruli Al Kahfi Mubaroq	Indonesia	11.80	q
5	1	7	Mohammed Ayade	Iraq	11.81	SB
6	3	7	Peerapon Watbok	Thailand	11.94	
7	2	3	Siwabannakorn Saokham	Thailand	11.97	
8	2	1	Urganchbek Egamnazarov	Uzbekistan	31.89	
	1	3	Miran Sakhatov	Uzbekistan	DQ	DQ R49.6 (b)
	3	5	Husain Abdulaziz Mohamed	Bahrain	DQ	DQ R17.8

==== Final ====
Final held on 24 October 2023.

Rank	Lane	Name	Nationality	Time	Notes
1st place, gold medalist(s)	5	Di Dongdong	China	11.23	
2nd place, silver medalist(s)	3	Zhao Pingan	China	11.33	PB
3rd place, bronze medalist(s)	7	Ye Tao	China	11.45	PB
4	1	Ruli Al Kahfi Mubaroq	Indonesia	11.70	PB

=== T12 ===
==== Records ====
Prior to this competition, the existing world, Asian and Games records were as follows.

World Record	(Norway) Salum Ageze Kashafali	10.43	(Japan) Tokyo	August 29, 2021
Asian Record	(China) Li Yansong	10.91	(United Kingdom) London	September 4, 2012
Games Record	(Uzbekistan) Mansur Abdirashidov	11.21	(Indonesia) Jakarta	October 9, 2018

==== Round 1 ====
Round 1 held on 23 October 2023.

Rank	Heat	Lane	Name	Nationality	Time	Notes
1	2	7	Mehrdad Moradi	Iran	11.27	Q
2	2	5	Eko Saputra	Indonesia	11.32	q
3	1	3	Daiki Ishiyama	Japan	11.42	Q
4	1	7	Phạm Nguyễn Khánh Minh	Vietnam	11.51	q
5	1	5	Samad Abdul	Maldives	13.89	
6	2	6	Hassan Bohan	Kuwait	14.22	

==== Final ====
Final held on 23 October 2023.

Rank	Lane	Name	Nationality	Time	Notes
1st place, gold medalist(s)	5	Mehrdad Moradi	Iran	11.17	GR
2nd place, silver medalist(s)	7	Eko Saputra	Indonesia	11.22	PB
3rd place, bronze medalist(s)	3	Daiki Ishiyama	Japan	11.35	PB
4	1	Phạm Nguyễn Khánh Minh	Vietnam	DQ	DQ R17.8

=== T13 ===
==== Records ====
Prior to this competition, the existing world, Asian and Games records were as follows.

World Record	(Norway) Salum Ageze Kashafali	10.37	(Norway) Oslo	June 15, 2023
Asian Record	(Japan) Shuta Kawakami	10.98	(Japan) Kobe	April 30, 2023
Games Record	(China) Yuan Yizhi	11.19	(China) Guangzhou	December 16, 2010

==== Final ====
Final held on 23 October 2023.

Rank	Lane	Name	Nationality	Time	Notes
1st place, gold medalist(s)	7	Jakkariun Dammunee	Thailand	11.00	GR
2nd place, silver medalist(s)	3	Vahid Alinajimi	Iran	11.27	
3rd place, bronze medalist(s)	6	Doniyorjon Akhmedov	Uzbekistan	11.35	=SB
4	5	Qusai Musallam Al-Rawahi	Oman	11.78	
5	4	James Ethan Ang	Singapore	11.79	
6	9	Karzhaubay Tineyev	Kazakhstan	13.17	PB
	1	Muhammadmahmud Rahmatov	Tajikistan	DNS	
	2	Bounphet Thepthida	Laos	DNS	
	8	Ken Thepthida	Laos	DNS	

=== T34 ===
==== Records ====
Prior to this competition, the existing world, Asian and Games records were as follows.

T33	World Record	(Tanzania) John Stephen	16.24	(Tanzania) Dar es Salaam	June 13, 2003
T33	Asian Record	(Kuwait) Ahmad Al-Mutairi	16.43	(United Arab Emirates) Dubai	February 27, 2023
T33	Games Record	(Kuwait) Ahmad Al-Mutairi	16.81	(South Korea) Incheon	October 20, 2014
T34	World Record	(Tunisia) Walid Ktila	14.46	(Switzerland) Arbon	June 1, 2019
T34	Asian Record	(Thailand) Chaiwat Rattana	15.01	(France) Paris	July 13, 2023
T34	Games Record	(United Arab Emirates) Mohamed Alhammadi	15.99	(South Korea) Incheon	October 20, 2014

==== Final ====
Final held on 23 October 2023.

Rank	Lane	Name	Nationality	Class	Time	Notes
1st place, gold medalist(s)	6	Chaiwat Rattanan	Thailand	T34	15.18	GR
2nd place, silver medalist(s)	4	Gong Wenhao	China	T34	15.55	
3rd place, bronze medalist(s)	8	Ali Radi Arshid	Qatar	T34	15.60	PB
4	9	Mohamed Alhammadi	United Arab Emirates	T34	15.86	
5	7	Wang Yang	China	T34	15.90	
6	2	Mohamad Othman	United Arab Emirates	T34	15.94	
7	5	Ahmed Nawad	United Arab Emirates	T34	16.24	
8	3	Mohammed Rashid Al-Kubaisi	Qatar	T34	16.51	
9	1	Ebrahim Al-Moadhen	Bahrain	T33	21.52	R6.16.1

=== T35 ===
==== Records ====
Prior to this competition, the existing world, Asian and Games records were as follows.

World Record	(Russia) Dmitrii Safronov	11.39	(Japan) Tokyo	August 30, 2021
Asian Record	(China) Yang Sen	12.29	(China) Beijing	September 13, 2008
Games Record	(India) Narayan Thakur	14.02	(Indonesia) Jakarta	October 9, 2018

==== Final ====
Final held on 26 October 2023.

Rank	Lane	Name	Nationality	Time	Notes
1st place, gold medalist(s)	6	Alireza Zare	Iran	12.74	GR
2nd place, silver medalist(s)	8	Idrees Al-Zaidi	Iraq	13.19	PB
3rd place, bronze medalist(s)	5	Narayan Thakur	India	14.37	
4	4	Bao Chui Yiu	Hong Kong	14.50	
5	7	Ravi Kumar	India	14.74	

=== T36 ===
==== Records ====
Prior to this competition, the existing world, Asian and Games records were as follows.

World Record	(Australia) James Turner	11.72	(United Arab Emirates) Dubai	November 10, 2019
Asian Record	(China) Yang Yifei	11.79	(United Arab Emirates) Dubai	October 9, 2018
Games Record	(Malaysia) Mohamad Ridzuan Mohamad Puzi	11.87	(Indonesia) Jakarta	October 9, 2018

==== Round 1 ====
Round 1 held on 26 October 2023.

Rank	Heat	Lane	Name	Nationality	Time	Notes
1	1	7	Yang Yifei	China	12.13	Q
2	1	8	Mohamad Ridzuan Mohamad Puzi	Malaysia	12.17	Q, SB
3	2	4	Deng Peicheng	China	12.48	Q
4	1	6	Taha Abdullah Al-Harrasi	Oman	12.53	Q, SB
5	1	4	Izzat Turgunov	Uzbekistan	12.60	q
6	2	7	Takeru Matsumoto	Japan	12.61	Q
7	2	6	Abdulsattar Challoob	Iraq	13.42	Q
8	2	5	Jamoliddin Akobirov	Uzbekistan	14.37	q
9	1	5	Chu Chak Sang	Hong Kong	14.70	
10	2	8	Sergey Kharlamov	Kazakhstan	15.17	
11	2	9	Chirag	India	15.51	

==== Final ====
Final held on 27 October 2023.

Rank	Lane	Name	Nationality	Time	Notes
1st place, gold medalist(s)	7	Deng Peicheng	China	11.80	GR
2nd place, silver medalist(s)	5	Yang Yifei	China	12.15	
3rd place, bronze medalist(s)	4	Takeru Matsumoto	Japan	12.38	
4	9	Taha Abdullah Al-Harrasi	Oman	12.53	=SB
5	3	Izzat Turgunov	Uzbekistan	12.64	
6	8	Abdulsattar Challoob	Iraq	13.10	
7	2	Jamoliddin Akobirov	Uzbekistan	14.34	
	6	Mohamad Ridzuan Mohamad Puzi	Malaysia	DQ	DQ R17.8

=== T37 ===
==== Records ====
Prior to this competition, the existing world, Asian and Games records were as follows.

World Record	(United States) Nick Mayhugh	10.95	(Japan) Tokyo	August 27, 2021
Asian Record	(Indonesia) Saptoyoga Purnomo	11.27	(France) Paris	July 10, 2023
Games Record	(Indonesia) Saptoyoga Purnomo	11.49	(Indonesia) Jakarta	October 9, 2018

==== Final ====
Final held on 26 October 2023.

Rank	Lane	Name	Nationality	Time	Notes
1st place, gold medalist(s)	5	Saptoyoga Purnomo	Indonesia	11.35	GR
2nd place, silver medalist(s)	7	Ali Yousef Al-Nakhli	Saudi Arabia	12.11	SB
3rd place, bronze medalist(s)	6	Shreyansh Trivedi	India	12.24	
4	4	Thamer Ahmed Al-Zahrani	Saudi Arabia	12.65	PB
5	8	Lionel Toh	Singapore	12.93	PB
6	9	Ali Al-Jadba	Palestine	17.02	

=== T38 ===
==== Records ====
Prior to this competition, the existing world, Asian and Games records were as follows.

World Record	(China) Hu Jianwen	10.74	(Brazil) Rio de Janeiro	September 13, 2016
Asian Record	(China) Hu Jianwen	10.74	(Brazil) Rio de Janeiro	September 13, 2016
Games Record	(China) Zhu Dening	11.33	(Indonesia) Jakarta	October 9, 2018

==== Final ====
Final held on 26 October 2023.

Rank	Lane	Name	Nationality	Time	Notes
1st place, gold medalist(s)	7	Zhu Dening	China	11.08	GR
2nd place, silver medalist(s)	5	Zhou Peng	China	11.24	
3rd place, bronze medalist(s)	4	Zhong Huanghao	China	11.50	SB
4	9	Ali Al-Rikabi	Iraq	11.68	SB
5	6	Amornthep Phonpanna	Thailand	11.73	
6	2	Reza Hatamishooli	Iran	11.82	
7	3	Abbas Al-Darraji	Iraq	12.03	
8	8	Nathayod Chaikhan	Thailand	12.09	
9	1	Mohammed Al-Anbagi	Iraq	13.90	

=== T44 ===
==== Records ====
Prior to this competition, the existing world, Asian and Games records were as follows.

World Record	(South Africa) Mpumelelo Mhlongo	11.00	(United Arab Emirates) Dubai	November 11, 2019
Games Record	(Thailand) Denpoom Kotcharang	11.87	(Indonesia) Jakarta	October 9, 2018

==== Final ====
Final held on 24 October 2023.

Rank	Lane	Name	Nationality	Time	Notes
1st place, gold medalist(s)	8	Gamage Maththaka	Sri Lanka	11.63	GR
2nd place, silver medalist(s)	2	Eddy Bernard	Malaysia	11.86	
3rd place, bronze medalist(s)	6	Nour Mohammed Asana	Saudi Arabia	12.07	SB
4	9	Ryan Arda Diarta	Indonesia	12.33	SB
5	7	Kumar Vijay	India	12.34	
6	3	Amila Warnakulasooriya	Sri Lanka	12.36	
7	5	Manoj Baskar	India	12.48	
	4	Vinay Kumar Lal	India	DQ	DQ R17.8

=== T47 ===
==== Records ====
Prior to this competition, the existing world, Asian and Games records were as follows.

T45	World Record	(Brazil) Yohansson Nascimento	10.94	(United Kingdom) London	September 6, 2012
T45	Asian Record	(China) Zhao Xu	11.05	(United Kingdom) London	September 6, 2012
T45	Games Record	(China) Zhao Xu	11.19	(China) Guangzhou	December 18, 2010
T46/47	World Record	(Brazil) Petrúcio Ferreira	10.29	(Brazil) São Paulo	March 31, 2022
T46/47	Asian Record	(China) Wang Hao	10.74	(Japan) Tokyo	August 27, 2021
T46/47	Games Record	(China) Wang Hao	10.80	(Indonesia) Jakarta	October 10, 2018

==== Round 1 ====
Round 1 held on 23 October 2023.

Rank	Heat	Lane	Name	Nationality	Class	Time	Notes
1	2	5	Kakeru Ishida	Japan	T46	11.06	Q
2	1	5	Wang Hao	China	T46	11.08	Q
3	1	6	Nur Ferry Pradana	Indonesia	T47	11.10	Q, SB
4	1	7	Mohammed Shiek Kaki	India	T46	11.27	Q
5	2	4	Rizal Bagus Saktyono	Indonesia	T47	11.32	Q
6	1	4	Yuya Sambongi	Japan	T45	11.38	q
7	1	3	Davoudali Ghasemi	Iran	T47	11.54	q
8	2	6	Arman Dino	Philippines	T47	11.60	Q
9	2	7	Firza Faturahman Listianto	Indonesia	T46	11.85	
10	1	8	Dewage Dangalla	Sri Lanka	T47	12.02	
11	2	9	Saman Subasinghe	Sri Lanka	T47	12.25	
12	2	3	Nidal Abughaben	Palestine	T47	13.93	
13	1	9	Sangbu Bhote	Nepal	T46	16.57	
	2	8	Dilip Mahadu Gavit	India	T46	DQ	DQ R17.8

==== Final ====
Final held on 26 October 2023.

Rank	Lane	Name	Nationality	Class	Time	Notes
1st place, gold medalist(s)	5	Wang Hao	China	T46	10.99	=SB
2nd place, silver medalist(s)	6	Kakeru Ishida	Japan	T46	11.10.096	
3rd place, bronze medalist(s)	7	Nur Ferry Pradana	Indonesia	T47	11.10.099	=SB
4	4	Rizal Bagus Saktyono	Indonesia	T47	11.29	
5	9	Mohammed Shiek Kaki	India	T46	11.31	
6	3	Yuya Sambongi	Japan	T45	11.40	
7	2	Davoudali Ghasemi	Iran	T47	11.45	PB
8	8	Arman Dino	Philippines	T47	11.60	

=== T52 ===
==== Records ====
Prior to this competition, the existing world, Asian and Games records were as follows.

T51	World Record	(Belgium) Roger Habsch	19.32	(Switzerland) Arbon	May 18, 2023
T51	Asian Record	(Bahrain) Mohamed Al-Shook	21.93	(United Arab Emirates) Dubai	February 27, 2023
T52	World Record	(United States) Raymond Martin	16.41	(Switzerland) Arbon	May 30, 2019
T52	Asian Record	(Japan) Yuki Oya	16.75	(Japan) Kobe	July 10, 2021
T52	Games Record	(Japan) Tatsuya Ito	18.06	(Indonesia) Jakarta	October 9, 2018

==== Final ====
Final held on 24 October 2023.

Rank	Lane	Name	Nationality	Class	Time	Notes
1st place, gold medalist(s)	5	Tatsuya Ito	Japan	T52	17.41	GR
2nd place, silver medalist(s)	3	Jerrold Mangliwan	Philippines	T52	18.65	PB
3rd place, bronze medalist(s)	6	Jeong Jong-dae	South Korea	T52	18.67	
4	4	Hirokazu Ueyonabaru	Japan	T52	18.70	
5	7	Pichaya Kurattanasiri	Thailand	T52	19.60	
6	8	Mohamed Al-Shook	Bahrain	T51	23.62	

=== T53 ===
==== Records ====
Prior to this competition, the existing world, Asian and Games records were as follows.

World Record	(Canada) Brent Lakatos	14.10	(Switzerland) Arbon	May 27, 2017
Asian Record	(Thailand) Pongsakorn Paeyo	14.20	(Japan) Tokyo	September 1, 2021
Games Record	(Thailand) Pongsakorn Paeyo	14.80	(Indonesia) Jakarta	October 9, 2018

==== Final ====
Final held on 24 October 2023.

Rank	Lane	Name	Nationality	Time	Notes
1st place, gold medalist(s)	4	Abdulrahman Al-Qurashi	Saudi Arabia	14.56	GR
2nd place, silver medalist(s)	7	Pongsakorn Paeyo	Thailand	14.62	
3rd place, bronze medalist(s)	5	Pichet Krungget	Thailand	15.29	
4	6	Yoo Byung-hoon	South Korea	15.52	
5	9	Sopa Intasen	Thailand	15.67	
6	8	Yoon Kyung-chan	South Korea	15.80	
7	3	Enkhmanlai Purevtsog	Mongolia	15.89	PB

=== T54 ===
==== Records ====
Prior to this competition, the existing world, Asian and Games records were as follows.

World Record	(Finland) Leo-Pekka Tähti	13.63	(United Kingdom) London	September 11, 2012
World Record	(Thailand) Athiwat Paeng-nuea	13.63	(France) Paris	July 15, 2023
Asian Record	(Thailand) Athiwat Paeng-nuea	13.63	(France) Paris	July 15, 2023
Games Record	(Thailand) Supachai Koysub	14.02	(China) Guangzhou	December 18, 2010

==== Round 1 ====
Round 1 held on 24 October 2023.

Rank	Heat	Lane	Name	Nationality	Time	Notes
1	2	7	Athiwat Paeng-nuea	Thailand	13.88	Q, GR
2	2	3	Jaenal Aripin	Indonesia	14.49	Q, SB
3	2	4	Zhang Ying	China	14.50	Q
4	2	6	Tomoki Ikoma	Japan	14.63	q
5	1	8	Saichon Konjen	Thailand	14.71	Q
6	2	5	Jamaan Al-Zahrani	Saudi Arabia	14.73	q
7	1	5	Phiphatphong Sianglam	Thailand	14.83	Q
8	1	7	Albaraa Sultan Al-Qarni	Saudi Arabia	15.06	Q
9	1	3	Hu Yang	China	15.73.721	
10	1	6	Vun Van	Cambodia	15.73.730	
11	1	4	Manoj Kumar Sabapathi	India	16.83	
	2	8	Badir Abbas Alhosani	United Arab Emirates	DNS	

==== Final ====
Final held on 25 October 2023.

Rank	Lane	Name	Nationality	Time	Notes
1st place, gold medalist(s)	6	Athiwat Paeng-nuea	Thailand	13.66	GR
2nd place, silver medalist(s)	9	Zhang Ying	China	14.41	
3rd place, bronze medalist(s)	5	Jaenal Aripin	Indonesia	14.47	SB
4	4	Saichon Konjen	Thailand	14.59	
5	2	Tomoki Ikoma	Japan	14.70	
6	7	Phiphatphong Sianglam	Thailand	14.78	
7	3	Jamaan Al-Zahrani	Saudi Arabia	14.85	
8	8	Albaraa Sultan Al-Qarni	Saudi Arabia	14.89	PB

=== T63 ===
==== Records ====
Prior to this competition, the existing world, Asian and Games records were as follows.

T42	World Record	(Russia) Anton Prokhorov	12.04	(Japan) Tokyo	August 30, 2021
T42	Games Record	(Sri Lanka) Amila Warnakulasooriya	12.56	(Indonesia) Jakarta	October 9, 2018
T63	World Record	(Brazil) Vinícius Gonçalves Rodrigues	11.95	(Brazil) São Paulo	April 25, 2019
T63	Asian Record	(Japan) Atsushi Yamamoto	12.61	(Qatar) Doha	October 25, 2015
T63	Games Record	(Japan) Atsushi Yamamoto	12.81	(South Korea) Incheon	October 21, 2014

==== Final ====
Final held on 27 October 2023.

Rank	Lane	Name	Nationality	Class	Time	Notes
1st place, gold medalist(s)	3	Partin	Indonesia	T42	12.24	GR
2nd place, silver medalist(s)	2	Anil Yodha Pedige	Sri Lanka	T42	12.98	
3rd place, bronze medalist(s)	5	Phalathip Khamta	Thailand	T63	13.12	PB
4	8	Charitha Indrapala	Sri Lanka	T42	13.39	
5	4	Hajime Kondo	Japan	T63	13.60	
6	6	Katsuaki Inagaki	Japan	T63	13.95	
7	7	Kumar Vijay	India	T42	14.25	
8	9	Mohammad Nalem Durani	Afghanistan	T42	20.30	
	1	Kantinan Khumphong	Thailand	T63	DNS	

=== T64 ===
==== Records ====
Prior to this competition, the existing world, Asian and Games records were as follows.

World Record	(United States) Richard Browne	10.61	(Qatar) Doha	October 29, 2015
Asian Record	(Japan) Shunsuke Itani	11.31	(Japan) Ise City	July 30, 2022
Games Record	(Japan) Shunsuke Itani	11.70	(Indonesia) Jakarta	October 9, 2018

==== Final ====
Final held on 24 October 2023.

Rank	Lane	Name	Nationality	Time	Notes
1st place, gold medalist(s)	6	Kengo Oshima	Japan	11.27	AR
2nd place, silver medalist(s)	7	Shunsuke Itani	Japan	11.49	
3rd place, bronze medalist(s)	9	Pea Soe	Myanmar	11.63	
4	4	Pranav Prashant Desai	India	11.91	SB
5	5	Denpoom Kotcharang	Thailand	11.92	=SB
6	8	Arz Zahreddine	Lebanon	12.15	SB
