= 2024 World Para Athletics Championships – Men's 100 metres =

The men's 100 metres at the 2024 World Para Athletics Championships were held in Kobe.

== Medalists ==
Serkan Yıldırım No class and DQ. Gold for USA, Silver for GBR and bronze for MAR.

Event	Gold	Silver	Bronze
T11	Di Dongdong; China	Ye Tao; China	Eduardo Manuel Uceda Novas; Spain
T12	Serkan Yıldırım; Turkey	Noah Malone; United States	Zach Shaw; Great Britain
T13	Skander Djamil Athmani; Algeria	Shuta Kawakami; Japan	Salum Ageze Kashafali; Norway
T34	Walid Ktila; Tunisia	Gong Wenhao; China	Henry Manni; Finland
T35	Artem Kalashian; Neutral Paralympic Athletes (NPA)	David Dzhatiev; Neutral Paralympic Athletes (NPA)	Dmitrii Safronov; Neutral Paralympic Athletes (NPA)
T36	Deng Peicheng; China	Yang Yifei; China	Mokhtar Didane; Algeria
T37	Ricardo Gomes de Mendonça; Brazil	Andrey Vdovin; Neutral Paralympic Athletes (NPA)	Saptoyoga Purnomo; Indonesia
T38	Jaydin Blackwell; United States	Thomas Young; Great Britain	Zhou Peng; China
T44	Mpumelelo Mhlongo; South Africa	Eddy Bernard; Malaysia	Indika Gamage; Sri Lanka
T47	Petrúcio Ferreira; Brazil	Michal Derus; Poland	Hao Wang; China
T51	Roger Habsch; Belgium	Cody Fournie; Canada	Edgar Navarro; Mexico
T52	Maxime Carabin; Belgium	Salvador Hernández; Mexico	Tomoki Sato; Japan
T53	Adbulrahman Alqurashi; Saudi Arabia	Ariosvaldo Fernandes da Silva; Brazil	Mohamed Nidhal Khelifi; Tunisia
T54	Leo-Pekka Tähti; Finland	Hu Yang; China	Juan Pablo Cervantes García; Mexico
T63	Léon Schäfer; Germany	Puseletso Michael Mabote; South Africa	Joel de Jong; Netherlands
T64	Sherman Guity; Costa Rica	Hunter Woodhall; United States	Derek Loccident; United States
T72	Carlo Fabio Marcello Calcagni; Italy	Vinicius Marques; Brazil	Deividas Podobajevas; Lithuania

== T11 ==
The event took place on 23 May.

Rank	Lane	Name	Nationality	Time	Notes
1st place, gold medalist(s)	3	Di Dongdong	China	11.28	SB
2nd place, silver medalist(s)	7	Ye Tao	China	11.36	PB
3rd place, bronze medalist(s)	1	Eduardo Manuel Uceda Novas	Spain	11.44	SB
-	5	Athanasios Ghavelas	Greece	DQ	R19.4

== T12 ==
The event took place on 18 May.

Rank	Lane	Name	Nationality	Time	Notes
1st place, gold medalist(s)	3	Serkan Yıldırım	Turkey	10.53	CR
2nd place, silver medalist(s)	5	Noah Malone	United States	10.55	=SB
3rd place, bronze medalist(s)	7	Zachary Shaw	United Kingdom	10.97	SB
4	1	Mouncef Bouja	Morocco	11.03	SB

== T13 ==
The event took place on 20 May.

Rank	Lane	Name	Nationality	Time	Notes
1st place, gold medalist(s)	5	Skander Djamil Athmani	Algeria	10.44	CR
2nd place, silver medalist(s)	4	Shuta Kawakami	Japan	10.70	AR
3rd place, bronze medalist(s)	6	Salum Ageze Kashafali	Norway	10.79	
4	7	Chad Perris	Australia	10.82	AR
5	3	Jean Carlos Mina Aponzá	Colombia	11.13	SB
6	9	Johannes Nambala	Namibia	11.29	SB
7	8	Philipp Handler	Switzerland	11.36	SB
8	2	Max Marzillier	Germany	11.49	SB

== T34 ==
The event took place on 21 May.

Rank	Lane	Name	Nationality	Time	Notes
1st place, gold medalist(s)	5	Walid Ktila	Tunisia	15.29	SB
2nd place, silver medalist(s)	4	Gong Wenhao	China	15.67	
3rd place, bronze medalist(s)	8	Henry Manni	Finland	15.76	
4	7	Mohamad Othman	United Arab Emirates	15.77	
5	9	Ahmed Nawad	United Arab Emirates	15.82 (.814)	
6	3	Mohamed Alhammadi	United Arab Emirates	15.82 (.820)	
7	6	Ali Radi Arshid	Qatar	16.08	
8	2	Roberto Michel	Mauritius	16.13	

== T35 ==
The event took place on 24 May.

Rank	Lane	Name	Nationality	Time	Notes
1st place, gold medalist(s)	7	Artem Kalashian	Neutral Paralympic Athletes	11.71	
2nd place, silver medalist(s)	4	David Dzhatiev	Neutral Paralympic Athletes	11.93	
3rd place, bronze medalist(s)	6	Dmitrii Safronov	Neutral Paralympic Athletes	12.13	
4	5	Maximiliano Villa	Argentina	12.24	
5	8	Anastasios Vougiouklidis	Greece	14.27	
6	2	Ondrej Bartosek	Czech Republic	14.30	
7	3	Bao Chui Yiu	Hong Kong	14.43	

== T36 ==
The event took place on 23 May.

Rank	Lane	Name	Nationality	Time	Notes
1st place, gold medalist(s)	7	Deng Peicheng	China	11.95	SB
2nd place, silver medalist(s)	5	Yang Yifei	China	12.35 (.344)	
3rd place, bronze medalist(s)	4	Mokhtar Didane	Algeria	12.35 (.345)	
4	8	Takeru Matsumoto	Japan	12.35 (.348)	SB
5	6	Evgenii Torsunov	Neutral Paralympic Athletes	12.46	
6	3	Mohamad Ridzuan Mohamad Puzi	Malaysia	12.50	
7	7	Aser Mateus Almeida Ramos	Brazil	12.80	
8	9	Fakhr Eddine Thelaidjia	Algeria	13.01	

== T37 ==
The event took place on 18 May.

Rank	Lane	Name	Nationality	Time	Notes
1st place, gold medalist(s)	4	Ricardo Gomes de Mendonça	Brazil	11.30	CR
2nd place, silver medalist(s)	7	Andrey Vdovin	Neutral Paralympic Athletes	11.54	SB
3rd place, bronze medalist(s)	5	Saptoyogo Purnomo	Indonesia	11.63	SB
4	6	Edson Cavalcante Pinheiro	Brazil	11.77	
5	8	Ali Alnakhli	Saudi Arabia	11.79	SB
6	3	Andrés Malambo	Colombia	11.99	
7	9	Yeferson Suárez	Colombia	12.21	
8	2	Thamer Alzahrani	Saudi Arabia	12.44	

== T38 ==
The event took place on 18 May.

Rank	Lane	Name	Nationality	Time	Notes
1st place, gold medalist(s)	5	Jaydin Blackwell	United States	10.86	CR
2nd place, silver medalist(s)	6	Thomas Young	Great Britain	11.02	SB
3rd place, bronze medalist(s)	8	Zhou Peng	China	11.07	PB
4	4	Dimitri Jozwicki	France	11.10	SB
5	7	Ryan Medrano	United States	11.13	PB
6	3	Santiago Solís	Colombia	11.25	SB
7	9	Nick Mayhugh	United States	11.34	SB
8	2	José Rodolfo Chessani Garcia	Mexico	11.61	

== T44 ==
The event took place on 20 May.

Rank	Lane	Name	Nationality	Time	Notes
1st place, gold medalist(s)	5	Mpumelelo Mhlongo	South Africa	11.34	SB
2nd place, silver medalist(s)	4	Eddy Bernard	Malaysia	11.77	PB
3rd place, bronze medalist(s)	7	Indika Gamage	Sri Lanka	11.83	
4	6	Nour Alsana	Saudi Arabia	11.96	
5	2	Dzmitry Bartashevich	Neutral Paralympic Athletes	11.97	PB
6	8	Huang Ruihua	China	12.09	
7	9	Denzel Namene	Namibia	12.41	
8	3	Jawad Alwawi	Saudi Arabia	12.52	

== T47 ==
The event took place on 17 May.

Rank	Lane	Name	Nationality	Class	Time	Notes
1st place, gold medalist(s)	5	Petrucio Ferreira dos Santos	Brazil	T47	10.83	
2nd place, silver medalist(s)	7	Michał Derus	Poland	T47	10.88 (.877)	SB
3rd place, bronze medalist(s)	4	Hao Wang	China	T46	10.88 (.878)	SB
4	6	Korban Best	United States	T47	10.93	
5	8	Raciel Gonzalez Isidoria	Cuba	T46	11.01	
6	2	Washington Junior	Brazil	T47	11.09 (.085)	
7	9	Jaydon Page	Australia	T47	11.09 (.089)	
8	3	Kevin Santos	United Kingdom	T47	11.14	SB

== T51 ==
The event took place on 24 May.

Rank	Lane	Name	Nationality	Time	Notes
1st place, gold medalist(s)	5	Roger Habsch	Belgium	20.82	
2nd place, silver medalist(s)	4	Cody Fournie	Canada	21.17	PB
3rd place, bronze medalist(s)	7	Edgar Cesareo Navarro Sanchez	Mexico	21.85	SB
4	6	Mohamed Berrahal	Algeria	21.94	=SB
5	3	Helder Mestre	Portugal	23.99	

== T52 ==
The event took place on 24 May.

Rank	Lane	Name	Nationality	Time	Notes
1st place, gold medalist(s)	5	Maxime Carabin	Belgium	16.79	
2nd place, silver medalist(s)	4	Salvador Hernández	Mexico	17.85	
3rd place, bronze medalist(s)	3	Tomoki Sato	Japan	17.91	
4	6	Cristian Torres	Colombia	17.94	
5	7	Tatsuya Ito	Japan	17.96	
6	9	Fabian Blum	Switzerland	17.99	
7	2	Beat Bösch	Switzerland	18.17	
8	8	Leonardo de Jesús Pérez	Mexico	18.45	

== T53 ==
The event took place on 22 May.

Rank	Lane	Name	Nationality	Time	Notes
1st place, gold medalist(s)	5	Abdulrahman Al-Qurashi	Saudi Arabia	14.87	
2nd place, silver medalist(s)	6	Ariosvaldo Fernandes da Silva	Brazil	15.05	SB
3rd place, bronze medalist(s)	7	Mohamed Khelifi	Tunisia	15.23	
4	4	Pierre Fairbank	France	15.26	
5	3	Yoo Byung-hoon	South Korea	15.65	SB
6	8	Bob Hunt	United States	16.14 (.132)	
7	2	Purevtsog Enkhmanlai	Mongolia	16.14 (.137)	

== T54 ==
The event took place on 24 May.

Rank	Lane	Name	Nationality	Time	Notes
1st place, gold medalist(s)	7	Leo-Pekka Tähti	Finland	13.78	SB
2nd place, silver medalist(s)	5	Hu Yang	China	13.95	SB
3rd place, bronze medalist(s)	6	Juan Pablo Cervantes Garcia	Mexico	13.97	SB
4	8	Leon Bailey	Australia	14.31	
5	2	Esa-Pekka Mattila	Finland	14.33	SB
6	4	Yasser Musanganya	France	14.46	
7	9	Tomoki Ikoma	Japan	14.52	
8	3	Mamudo Baldé	Portugal	14.61	

== T63 ==
The event took place on 25 May.

Rank	Lane	Name	Nationality	Class	Time	Notes
1st place, gold medalist(s)	5	Léon Schäfer	Germany	T63	12.03	CR
2nd place, silver medalist(s)	4	Puseleto Mabote	South Africa	T63	12.05	
3rd place, bronze medalist(s)	3	Joel de Jong	Netherlands	T63	12.19	SB
4	6	Partin	Indonesia	T42	12.43	
5	7	Vinícius Rodrigues	Brazil	T63	12.47	
6	8	Phalathip Khamta	Thailand	T63	12.77	PB
7	9	Katsuaki Inagaki	Japan	T63	13.49	SB
8	2	Ilias Benkaddour	Belgium	T63	14.59	

== T64 ==
The event took place on 20 May.

Rank	Lane	Name	Nationality	Class	Time	Notes
1st place, gold medalist(s)	4	Sherman Guity	Costa Rica	T64	10.88	
2nd place, silver medalist(s)	6	Hunter Woodhall	United States	T62	11.13	
3rd place, bronze medalist(s)	3	Derek Loccident	United States	T64	11.40	
4	5	Kengo Oshima	Japan	T64	11.46	
5	2	Wallison André Fortes	Brazil	T64	11.47	PB
6	7	Francesco Loragno	Italy	T64	11.48	
7	8	Blake Leeper	United States	T62	11.74	
8	9	Shunsuke Itani	Japan	T64	12.45	

== T72 ==
The event took place on 17 May.

Rank	Lane	Name	Nationality	Time	Notes
1st place, gold medalist(s)	4	Carlo Fabio Marcello Calcagni	Italy	15.39	WR
2nd place, silver medalist(s)	6	Vinicius Marques Krieger Quintino	Brazil	17.54	
3rd place, bronze medalist(s)	7	Deividas Podobajevas	Lithuania	17.82	SB
4	5	Arturas Plodunovas	Lithuania	19.35	
5	3	Lasse Kromann	Denmark	20.96	SB
