= Artur Krzyzek =

Polish para athlete (born 2000)

Personal information
- Nationality: Polish
- Born: 15 September 2000 (age 25)

Sport
- Sport: Para athletics
- Disability class: T71
- Event: 100 metres
Medal record
Men's para-athletics
Representing Poland
World Championships
Gold medal – first place	2025 New Delhi	100 m T71

Artur Krzyzek (born 15 September 2000) is a Polish frame runner who competes in T71 sprint events.

== Career ==
On 24 May 2025, Krzyzek competed at the World Para Athletics Grand Prix event held in Nottwil, Switzerland, and won a gold medal in the 100 metres T71 event, with a world record time of 21.96. In September 2025, he then competed at the 2025 World Para Athletics Championships and won a gold medal in the 100 metres T71 event with a time of 21.19 seconds. He became the first T71 champions as the event made its debut at the World Para Athletics Championships.
