= Athletics at the 2024 Summer Paralympics – Men's 100 metres T13 =

Men's 100 metres T13 at the XVII Paralympic Games
- Venue: Stade de France
- Dates: 1 September 2024 (round 1 & final)
- Competitors: 13 from 12 nations
- Winning time: 10.42 PR

Medalists
1st place, gold medalist(s)		Skander Djamil Athmani	Algeria
2nd place, silver medalist(s)		Salum Kashafali	Norway
3rd place, bronze medalist(s)		Shuta Kawakami	Japan

100 metres at the 2024 Summer Paralympics
Men · T11 · T12 · T13 · T34 · T35 · T36 · T37 · T38 · T44 · T47 · T51 · T52 · T53 · T54 · T63 · T64
Women · T11 · T12 · T13 · T34 · T35 · T36 · T37 · T38 · T47 · T53 · T54 · T63 · T64

The men's 100 metres T13 event at the 2024 Summer Paralympics in Paris, took place on 1 September 2024.

The T13 category is for athletes with a moderate visual impairment. Athletes in this category have a variety of visual impairments, but can typically recognize contours from a distance of 2 to 6 metres. Athletes in this category do not typically require a guide.

== Records ==
Prior to the competition, the existing records were as follows:

World Record	Salum Kashafali (NOR)	10.37	(Norway) Oslo	15 June 2023
Paralympic Record	Jason Smyth (IRL)	10.46	(United Kingdom) London	1 September 2012

Area	Time		Athlete	Location	Date
Africa	10.44		(Algeria) Skander Djamil Athmani	(Japan) Kobe	20 May 2024
America	10.64		(Colombia) Jean Carlos Mina Aponzá	(Japan) Tokyo	29 August 2021
Asia	10.70		(Japan) Shuta Kawakami	(Japan) Kobe	20 May 2024
Europe	10.37	WR	(Norway) Salum Kashafali	(Norway) Oslo	15 June 2023
Oceania	10.82		(Australia) Chad Perris	(Japan) Kobe	20 May 2024

== Results ==
=== Round 1 ===
First 3 in each heat (Q) and the next 2 fastest (q) advance to the Final.

==== Heat 1 ====
Rank	Lane	Athlete	Nation	Time	Notes
1	5	Skander Djamil Athmani	Algeria	10.51	Q
2	6	Chad Perris	Australia	10.87	Q
3	3	Samba Coulibaly	Mali	10.95	Q, PB
4	8	Vegard Sverd	Norway	11.20	SB
5	4	Max Marzillier	Germany	11.46	
6	7	Jakkarin Dammunee	Thailand	12.83	
Source:				Wind: +0.1 m/s	

==== Heat 2 ====
Rank	Lane	Athlete	Nation	Time	Notes
1	7	Salum Kashafali	Norway	10.57	Q
2	3	Shuta Kawakami	Japan	10.80	Q
3	4	Zak Skinner	Great Britain	10.97	Q
4	6	Isaac Jean-Paul	United States	10.97	q, SB
5	2	Johannes Nambala	Namibia	11.10	q, SB
6	5	Doniyorjon Akhmedov	Uzbekistan	11.42	SB
7	8	Winsdom Ikhiuwu Smith	Spain	11.74	
Source:				Wind: +0.1 m/s	

=== Final ===
Rank	Lane	Athlete	Nation	Time	Notes
1st place, gold medalist(s)	4	Skander Djamil Athmani	Algeria	10.42	PR, AR
2nd place, silver medalist(s)	5	Salum Kashafali	Norway	10.47	SB
3rd place, bronze medalist(s)	7	Shuta Kawakami	Japan	10.80	
4	6	Chad Perris	Australia	10.80	AR
5	2	Isaac Jean-Paul	United States	10.93	SB
6	3	Zak Skinner	Great Britain	10.93	
7	8	Samba Coulibaly	Mali	10.97	
8	9	Johannes Nambala	Namibia	11.09	SB
Source:				Wind: -0.1 m/s	
