= Para cycling =

Sport of cycling adapted for cyclists who have various disabilities

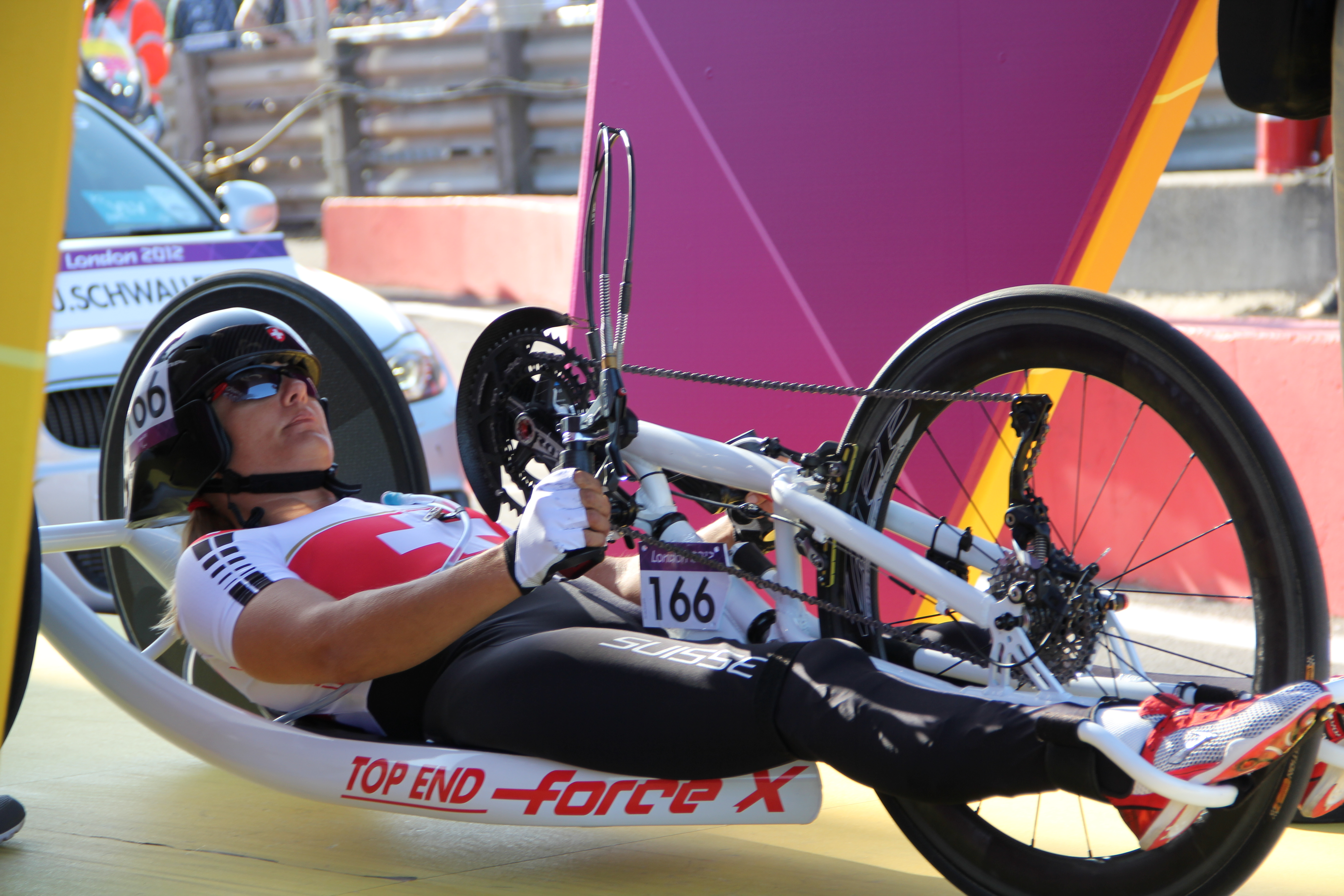
Handcyclist Ursula Schwaller at the 2012 Paralympic Games

Para cycling is the sport of cycling adapted for cyclists who have various disabilities. It is governed by the Union Cycliste Internationale (UCI). The sport is divided into two disciplined – track and road races, across seven different events. The Paralympic Para cycling programme includes individual pursuits, sprints and road time trials for both individuals and teams with range distances from 200m sprint to 15 km road races. The sport made its Paralympic debut at the 1984 Stoke Mandeville and New York Paralympic Games. In 2010, a UCI Para cycling road World Cup was introduced, while Para track cycling made its Commonwealth Games debut at Glasgow 2014.

== Para cycling at the Paralympics ==
Para cycling originated in the 1980s, starting with visually impaired riders who competed on a tandem with a sighted partner. In New York 1984 it entered the Summer Paralympic Games, where it consisted of 22 road cyclers with cerebral palsy. In Atlanta 1996 track cycling was included as well as a variety of disibility classes. Handcycling was included in the 2000 Sydney Paralympics as an exhibition event. The Para cycling events at the Sydney 2000 Paralympic Games featured 200 athletes followed by the inclusion of mixed team relay at the London 2012 Paralympic Games. The Rio 2016 Paralympic Games showcased the most athletes with 235 cyclists, while the Tokyo 2020 Paralympic Games hosted the biggest number of countries, welcoming 50 countries across 51 events.

== Events ==
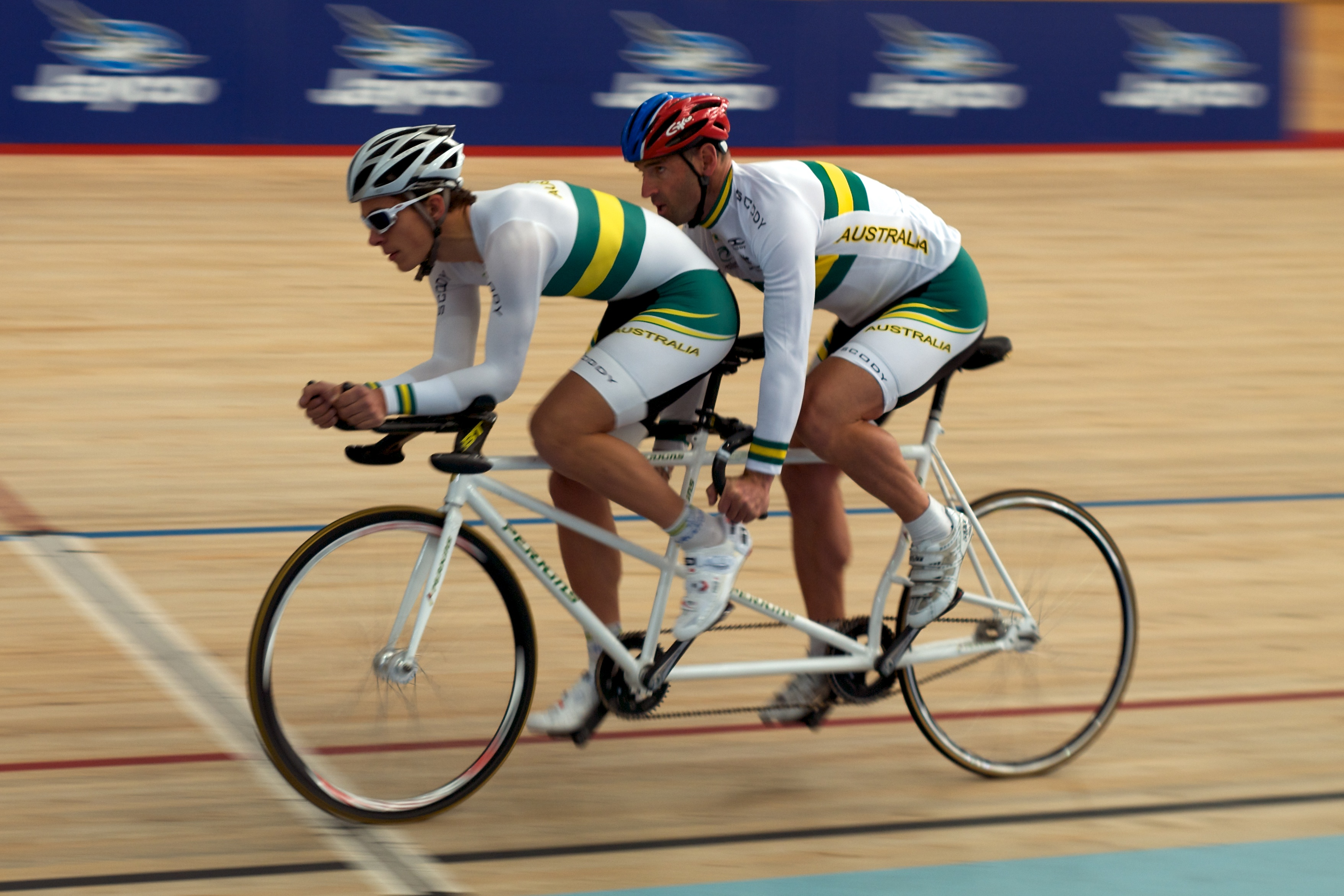
A tandem bicycle with the visually impaired cyclist in the rear seat, in front is the sighted pilot

Para-cycling events consist of the following three road races and five track events:

=== Road ===
- Road race (men and women)
- Individual time trial (men and women)
- Handcycling team relay (men and women, mix)

=== Track ===
- Tandem sprint (men and women)
- Team sprint (men and women, mixed event)
- 500 m time trial (men and women) or kilometre time trial (men and women)
- Individual pursuit (men and women)
- Scratch race (men and women)

== Classification ==
Classification of riders consists of three broad groups; visual impairment, cerebral palsy and physical impairment. These are subdivided into 14 functional categories for men and women. Riders are placed in the appropriate category according to their functional ability.

B: blind (tandem) B1-2

C: cycle C1-5

H: handbike H1-5

T: tricycle T1-2

== See also ==
- Racerunning
- Road cycling
- Track cycling
- UCI Para-cycling Road World Championships
- UCI Para-cycling Track World Championships
- Cycling at the Summer Paralympics
