= Finlay Menzies =

British para athlete (born 2005)

Personal information
- Full name: Finlay Jonathan Menzies
- Nationality: Scottish
- Born: 12 July 2005 (age 20)

Sport
- Sport: Para athletics
- Disability: Cerebral palsy
- Disability class: T72
- Events: 100 metres, 400 metres
Medal record
Men's para-athletics
Representing Great Britain
World Championships
Bronze medal – third place	2025 New Delhi	100 m T72

Finlay Jonathan Menzies (born 12 July 2005) is a Scottish frame runner who competes in T72 sprint events.

== Career ==
Menzies competed at the 2025 World Para Athletics Championships and won a bronze medal in the 100 metres T72 event with a personal best time of 16.29 seconds.

In November 2025 he was added to the UK's World Class Performance Programme.

In the first ever British championship for framerunning, Finlay took gold and the British Championship title in a closely contested final in a time of 16.57s. Just a week later, in the Welsh Senior Outdoor Track & Field Championships held at Cardiff International Stadium, Menzies set a new British Record of 16.02

The British Record for the 100m T72 category was taken below 16 seconds for the first time on 9 July 2026, when Menzies clocked 15.87s in the T72 100m final at the World International Frame Running Cup 2026, Bagsværd, Denmark.

== Personal life ==
Menzies was diagnosed with cerebral palsy.
