= Vinícius Cabral =

Brazilian para athlete (born 2001)

Personal information
- Full name: Vinícius Augusto Cabral
- Nationality: Brazilian
- Born: 26 October 2001 (age 24)

Sport
- Sport: Para athletics
- Disability class: T71
Medal record
Men's para-athletics
Representing Brazil
World Championships
| Silver medal – second place | 2025 New Delhi | 100 m T71 |

Vinícius Augusto Cabral (born 26 October 2001) is a Brazilian frame runner who competes in T71 sprint events.

== Career ==
On 4 August 2025, Cabral was selected to compete at the 2025 World Para Athletics Championships. He made his World Championships debut and won a silver medal in the 100 metres T71 event with a time of 22.43 seconds.
