= Naif Almasrahi =

Saudi Arabian para athlete (born 1990)

Personal information
- Nationality: Saudi Arabian
- Born: 20 February 1990 (age 36)

Sport
- Sport: Para athletics
- Disability class: T44
Medal record
Men's para-athletics
Representing Saudi Arabia
World Championships
Gold medal – first place	2025 New Delhi	100 m T44

Naif Almasrahi (born 20 February 1990) is a Saudi Arabian para athlete who competes in T44 sprint events.

== Career ==
In February 2025, Almasrahi competed at the World Para Athletics Grand Prix in Dubai, and won a gold medal in the 100 metres T44 event with an Asian record time of 11.23 seconds. He competed at the 2025 World Para Athletics Championships and won a gold medal in the 100 metres T44 event with a world record time of 10.94 seconds.
