= Carlo Calcagni =

Italian para-athlete (born 1968)

Personal information
- Born: 30 October 1968 (age 57) Sorrento, Italy

Sport
- Country: Italy
- Sport: Para-athletics
- Disability class: T72
Medal record
Paralympic athletics
Representing Italy
World Championships
Gold medal – first place	2024 Kobe	100 m
Gold medal – first place	2025 New Delhi	100 m
Gold medal – first place	2025 New Delhi	400 m

Carlo Fabio Marcello Calcagni (born 30 October 1968) is an Italian para-athlete, cyclist and officer in the Italian Army. In para-athletics, he competes in sprinting events at international track and field competitions. He has won medals at the World Para Athletics Championships and Invictus Games in sprinting. Prior to his para-athlete career, he previously served in the Italian Army.

== Military service ==
Calcagni enlisted in Italian Army in January 1988. During his service, he would serve as a helicopter pilot and paratrooper. In 1996, he was dispatched on a peacekeeping mission in Bosnia and Herzegovina, where he breathed heavy metal powders. By 2002, Calcagni discovered that he had fallen ill; this resulted him being diagnosed with numerous neurological diseases and retired from the army in 2007.

During his time in the army, he held the rank of colonel.

== Athletic career ==
In 1996, while still in the army, Calcagni competed in cycling. He retired from cycling in 2010 due to his recurring ill health. He returned four years later, this time as a paracyclist. In 2015, he won two gold medals at the Paracycling World Cup.

At the 2024 World Para Athletics Championships, Calcagni competed in the 100 metres, where he won his first gold medal. He competed at the 2025 World Para Athletics Championships, where he won two gold medals in the 400 metres and 100 metres.
