= Ryutaro Kuno =

Japanese para athlete (born 1999)

Personal information
- Nationality: Japanese
- Born: March 8, 1999 (age 27)

Sport
- Sport: Para athletics
- Disability: Retinitis pigmentosa
- Disability class: T12
Medal record
Men's para-athletics
Representing Japan
World Championships
| Silver medal – second place | 2025 New Delhi | 100 m T12 |
Asian Para Games
| Gold medal – first place | 2026 Aichi–Nagoya | 100 m T12 |

Ryutaro Kuno (久野 竜太朗, Kuno Ryūtarō; born March 8, 1999) is a Japanese para athlete who competes in T12 sprint events. He is a silver medalist at the World Championships.

== Early life ==
Kuno was diagnosed with retinitis pigmentosa when he was young. After graduating from high school, he worked at an auto parts company, where his eye condition worsened, causing him to resign from that job after three years. Kuno then enrolled in a school for the blind. It was around this time that he tried various sports such as archery, kickboxing and track and field. He ultimately decided to take up track and field.

== Career ==
In October 2023, Kuno competed at the Burning Emotions Kagoshima National Athletic Meet and won the 100 m event in his category. He also competed in the Japan Para Athletics Championships in 2024 and 2025, where he finished in second place in the same event.

In July 2025, Kuno was selected to compete for his country at the 2025 World Para Athletics Championships. He won a silver medal in the 100 metres T12 event.

== Personal life ==
Kuno is an employee of Simplex Holdings, a company that employs several disabled athletes.
