= Nathan Jason =

Australia para athlete (born 2002)

Personal information
- Nationality: Australian
- Born: 10 July 2002 (age 24)

Sport
- Sport: Para-athletics
- Disability: Cone dystrophy
- Disability class: T12
- Event: 100 metres
- Club: University of Sunshine Coast
- Coached by: Vincent Jason
Medal record
Men's para-athletics
Representing Australia
World Championships
Bronze medal – third place	2025 New Delhi	Universal 4 × 100 m relay

Nathan Jason (born 10 July 2002) is an Australian visually impaired para athlete who competes in T12 sprint events.

== Career ==
Jason began his career in para swimming, before transitioning to para-athletics. He competed at the 2025 World Para Athletics Championships and won a bronze medal in the universal 4 × 100 metres relay. He also competed in the 100 metres T12 event and finished in fourth place with a time of 11.11 seconds, finishing 0.07 seconds behind bronze medalist Kesley Teodoro.

== Personal life ==
Jason was born with Cone dystrophy. His older brother, Braedan, also has the same condition, and is a para swimmer for Australia.
