= Max Marzillier =

German Paralympic athlete (born 2001)

Personal information
- Born: 5 September 2001 (age 24) Rüdersdorf, Brandenburg, Germany

Sport
- Country: Germany
- Sport: Para-athletics
- Disability: Vision impairment
- Disability class: T13
- Events: 100 metres; 400 metres
Medal record
World Championships
Gold medal – first place	2025 New Delhi	400m T13

Max Marzillier (born 5 September 2001) is a visually impaired German Paralympic athlete competing in T13 classification sprinting events. He is a gold medalist at the World Para Athletics Championships.

== Career ==
Marzillier competed at the 2024 World Para Athletics Championships in the men's 100 metres T13, where he finished in last place. He represented Germany at the 2024 Summer Paralympics in Paris, France, where he competed in the 100 metres T13 event but did not win a medal.

Marzillier competed at the 2025 World Para Athletics Championships held in New Delhi, India, in the 100 metres and 400 metres events, winning the gold medal in the latter.
