= Athletics at the 2020 Summer Paralympics – Men's 200 metres T37 =

Men's 200 metres T37 at the XVI Paralympic Games
- Venue: Tokyo National Stadium
- Dates: 3 September 2021 (heats); 4 September 2021 (final)
- Competitors: 13 from 10 nations
- Winning time: 21.91

Medalists
1st place, gold medalist(s)		Nick Mayhugh	United States
2nd place, silver medalist(s)		Andrey Vdovin	RPC
3rd place, bronze medalist(s)		Ricardo Gomes de Mendonça	Brazil

The men's 200 metres T37 event at the 2020 Summer Paralympics in Tokyo, took place between 3 and 4 September 2021.

The T37 category is for ambulant athletes with cerebral palsy. These athletes have movement and coordination problems on one half of their body. They have good ability in their dominant side of their body (ie hemiplegia).

== Records ==
Prior to the competition, the existing records were as follows:

World Record	Andrey Vdovin (RUS)	22.59	Doha, Qatar	22 October 2015
Paralympic Record	Roman Kapranov (RUS)	23.10	London, United Kingdom	31 August 2012

Area	Time	Athlete	Nation
Africa	22.99	Fanie van der Merwe	South Africa
America	22.77	Vítor Antônio de Jesus	Brazil
Asia	22.70	Shang Guangxu	China
Europe	22.59 WR	Andrey Vdovin	Russia
Oceania	25.75	Mitchell Christiansen	Australia

== Results ==
=== Heats ===
Heat 1 took place on 3 September, at 20:12:

Rank	Lane	Name	Nationality	Time	Notes
1	6	Nick Mayhugh	United States	22.26	Q, WR
2	4	Chermen Kobesov	RPC	23.19	Q, SB
3	8	Saptoyoga Purnomo	Indonesia	23.41	Q, PB
4	3	Charl du Toit	South Africa	24.04	
5	7	Yaroslav Okapinskyi	Ukraine	24.15	PB
6	5	Vítor Antônio de Jesus	Brazil	24.79	SB

Heat 2 took place on 3 September, at 20:19:

Rank	Lane	Name	Nationality	Time	Notes
1	7	Andrey Vdovin	RPC	22.94	Q, SB
2	3	Ricardo Gomes de Mendonça	Brazil	22.96	Q, PB
3	4	Michał Kotkowski	Poland	23.29	Q, PB
4	8	Ali Alnakhli	Saudi Arabia	23.35	q, PB
5	6	Christian Gabriel Luis da Costa	Brazil	23.80	q
6	5	Brian Lionel Impellizzeri	Argentina	24.48	PB
7	2	David Pleitez	El Salvador	26.10	SB

=== Final ===
The final took place on 4 September, at 10:27:

Rank	Lane	Name	Nationality	Time	Notes
1st place, gold medalist(s)	6	Nick Mayhugh	United States	21.91	WR
2nd place, silver medalist(s)	4	Andrey Vdovin	RPC	22.24	AR
3rd place, bronze medalist(s)	5	Ricardo Gomes de Mendonça	Brazil	22.62	PB
4	7	Chermen Kobesov	RPC	22.85	PB
5	9	Michał Kotkowski	Poland	23.12	PB
6	8	Saptoyoga Purnomo	Indonesia	23.27	PB
7	3	Ali Alnakhli	Saudi Arabia	23.29	PB
8	2	Christian Gabriel Luis da Costa	Brazil	23.49	
