= Ricardo Gomes de Mendonça =

Brazilian paralympic athlete

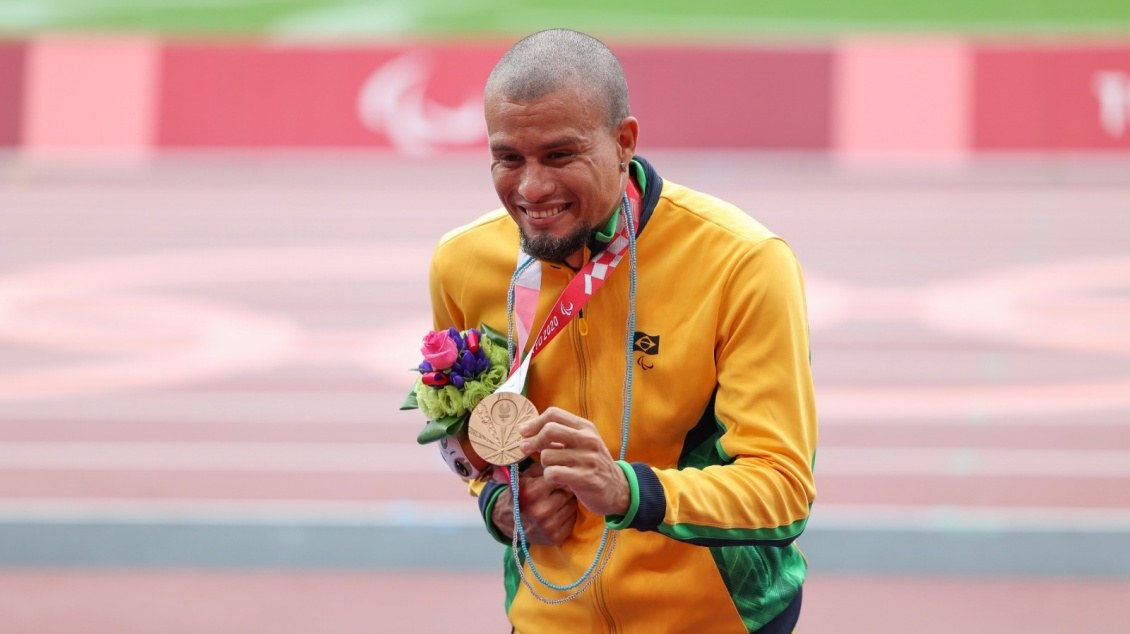
- Gomes in 2020

Personal information
- Born: 31 January 1990 (age 36) Natividade, Brazil

Sport
- Country: Brazil
- Sport: Para athletics
Medal record
Para athletics
Representing Brazil
Paralympic Games
Gold medal – first place	2024 Paris	100 m T37
Silver medal – second place	2024 Paris	200 m T37
Bronze medal – third place	2020 Tokyo	200 m T37
World Championships
Gold medal – first place	2023 Paris	100 m T37
Gold medal – first place	2024 Kobe	100 m T37
Gold medal – first place	2025 New Delhi	100 m T37
Gold medal – first place	2025 New Delhi	200 m T37

Ricardo Gomes de Mendonça (born 31 January 1990) is a Brazilian paralympic athlete. He competed at the 2020 Summer Paralympics in the athletics competition, winning the bronze medal in the men's 200 metres T37 event.
