= Fabian Blum =

Swiss Paralympic athlete (born 1995)

Personal information
- Born: 7 March 1995 (age 31) Pfaffnau, Switzerland

Sport
- Country: Switzerland
- Sport: Paralympic athletics
- Disability: Spinal cord injury
- Disability class: T52
Medal record
Paralympic athletics
Representing Switzerland
World Championships
Silver medal – second place	2023 Paris	100m T52
Bronze medal – third place	2025 New Delhi	100m T52
European Athletics Championships
Silver medal – second place	2021 Bydgoszcz	100m T52
Bronze medal – third place	2018 Berlin	1500m T52
Bronze medal – third place	2021 Bydgoszcz	1500m T52

Fabian Blum (born 7 March 1995) is a Swiss Paralympic athlete who competes in international elite track and field competitions in wheelchair racing.

== Early life ==
Born in Pfaffnau, Blum was an active gymnast from childhood until 2014, but fell during a double somersault during training on 1 November 2014, and has been paralyzed from the 5th/6th cervical vertebrae down ever since.

== Career ==
Since his accident, Blum has been a wheelchair athlete and trains at the Swiss Paraplegic Center in Nottwil. He won the bronze medal in the 1500 meters at the 2018 European Championships in Berlin. Blum finished 10th in the 100 meters and eighth in the 1500 meters at the 2019 World Championships held in Dubai.

At the 2021 European Championships, Blum won the silver medal in the 100 metres and bronze medal in the 1500 metres.

At the 2023 World Championships, Blum won the silver medal in the 100 metres. He represented Switzerland at the 2024 Summer Paralympics and competed in the 100 metres and 400 metres, finishing in fifth place in the latter.

Blum competed at the 2025 World Para Athletics Championships and won a bronze medal in the 100 metres event.
