= Athiwat Paeng-nuea =

Thai Paralympic athlete

Personal information
- Native name: อธิวัฒน์ แพงเหนือ
- Born: 20 October 2002 (age 24) Sakon Nakhon, Thailand

Sport
- Disability class: T54

Achievements and titles
- Paralympic finals: 2020
- Personal bests: 100 m: 13.63 (2023, WR); 400 m: 44.62 (2023)
Medal record
Men's para athletics
Representing Thailand
Paralympic Games
Gold medal – first place	2020 Tokyo	100 m T54
Silver medal – second place	2020 Tokyo	400 m T54
Silver medal – second place	2024 Paris	100 m T54
Silver medal – second place	2024 Paris	400 m T54
World Championships
Gold medal – first place	2023 Paris	100 m T54
Gold medal – first place	2025 New Delhi	100 m T54
Silver medal – second place	2023 Paris	400 m T54
Silver medal – second place	2025 New Delhi	400 m T54
Asian Para Games
Gold medal – first place	2022 Hangzhou	100 m T54
Gold medal – first place	2022 Hangzhou	400 m T54
Gold medal – first place	2026 Aichi-Nagoya	100 m T54
Bronze medal – third place	2026 Aichi-Nagoya	400 m T54

Athiwat Paeng-nuea (Thai: อธิวัฒน์ แพงเหนือ; born 20 October 2002) is a Paralympic athlete from Thailand who competes in category T54 sprint events. He represented Thailand at the 2020 Summer Paralympics and won a gold medal in the 100 metres T54 event and a silver medal in the 400 metres event.

== Career ==
Athiwat represented Thailand at the 2020 Summer Paralympics. On 29 August 2021, he set the new Paralympic record in the 400 metres event in the heat round and got through to won his first silver medal at the Paralympics Games. Then, he won his first gold medal in the 100 metres T54 event.

At the 2022 Asian Para Games, held in October 2023 in Hangzhou, China, Athiwat won the gold medal in the 100 metres T54 event and set the new game record with a time of 13.66.

== Major results ==
Year	Venue	Events	Heat		Final		Rank
Year	Venue	Events	Time	Rank	Time	Rank	Rank
Paralympic Games
2020	Tokyo, Japan	100 m T54	14.00	1	13.76 AR	1	1st place, gold medalist(s)
2020	Tokyo, Japan	400 m T54	44.87 PR	1	45.73	2	2nd place, silver medalist(s)
World Championships
2023	Paris, France	100 m T54	13.63 =WR	3	13.64	1	1st place, gold medalist(s)
2023	Paris, France	400 m T54	45.16	1	46.23	2	2nd place, silver medalist(s)
2023	Paris, France	800 m T54	1:32.97	1	1:32.02	8	8
Asian Para Games
2022	Hangzhou, China	100 m T54	13.88 GR	1	13.66 GR	1	1st place, gold medalist(s)
2022	Hangzhou, China	400 m T54	45.45 GR	1	44.62 GR	1	1st place, gold medalist(s)
