= Puseletso Mabote =

South African para-athlete (born 2005)

Personal information
- Born: 17 April 2005 (age 21) Nigel, Gauteng, South Africa

Sport
- Sport: Paralympic athletics
Medal record
World Championships
Gold medal – first place	2025 New Delhi	100 m T63
Silver medal – second place	2024 Kobe	100 m T63

Puseletso Michael Mabote (born 17 April 2005) is a South African para-athlete who competes in the T63 classification, in the long jump and sprinting events. He has medalled at the World Championships and competed in the Summer Paralympics twice.

== Early life ==
Born in Nigel, Gauteng, Mabote was involved in a car accident, in which a truck crashed into the family vehicle he was travelling in while on his way to school. He had his upper right leg from above the knee amputated as a result. Three years later, he would be introduced to Michael Stevens and Johan Snyders who introduced Mabote to track and field.

== Career ==
Mabote represented South Africa at the 2020 Summer Paralympics in 2021 and competed in the 100 metres and long jump, finishing in ninth place in the latter.

On 24 March 2024, Mabote set a world record in over 200m at 25.12 seconds in the T63 class. At the 2024 World Para Athletics Championships, he won the silver medal in the 100 metres. At the 2024 Summer Paralympics, he competed in the 100 metres and long jump, finishing in fifth place in the former.

Mabote competed at the 2025 World Para Athletics Championships and won the gold medal in the 100 m T63 event.
