= Marcus Perrineau-Daley =

British Paralympic athlete (born 1989)

Personal information
- Nationality: British
- Born: 17 February 1989 (age 37)

Sport
- Country: Great Britain
- Sport: Para-athletics
- Disability class: T52
- Event: sprints
Medal record
Men's para-athletics
Representing Great Britain
Paralympic Games
| Silver medal – second place | 2024 Paris | 100 m T52 |

Marcus Perrineau-Daley (born 17 February 1989) is a British T52 Paralympic sprint runner. He represented Great Britain at the 2024 Summer Paralympics.

== Career ==
His first major championship was the 2023 world championships, where he came 7th in the 100 metres.

The following year he came 10th in the same event at the 2024 World Para Athletics Championships.

Perrineau-Daley represented Great Britain at the 2024 Summer Paralympics and won a silver medal in the 100 metres T52 event behind Maxime Carabin.

== Personal life ==
On 19 October, 2014, Perrineau-Daley was involved in a motorcycle accident and broke his neck and back and severed his spinal cord.
