= Ye Tao =

Chinese para-athlete (born 1998)

Personal information
- Nationality: Chinese
- Born: 14 February 1998 (age 28) China

Sport
- Sport: Paralympic athletics
- Event(s): 100 metres, long jump
- Club: Fujian Province
- Coached by: Gao Zhiqiang
Medal record
Men's para athletics
Representing China
World Championships
Silver medal – second place	2023 Paris	Long jump T11
Silver medal – second place	2024 Kobe	100 m T11
Bronze medal – third place	2024 Kobe	Long jump T11
Asian Para Games
Silver medal – second place	2022 Hangzhou	Long jump T11
Bronze medal – third place	2022 Hangzhou	100m T11

Ye Tao (born 14 February 1998) is a Chinese Paralympic athlete who competes in para-athletics in the T11 classification. He predominantly competes in the 100 metres and long jump in his class. He has won multiple medals at the World Para Athletics Championships and the Asian Para Games.

== Career ==
Ye competed in his first major competition on a world stage, at the 2023 World Para Athletics Championships held in Paris, France. He won the silver medal in the men's long jump T11 event.

Ye made his Asian Para Games debut at the 2022 Asian Para Games held in 2023. There, he won the silver medal in the long jump and the bronze medal in the 100 metres.

Ye represented China at the 2024 World Para Athletics Championships and won the bronze medal in the long jump T11 and silver medal in the 100 metres.

Ye qualified for the T11 100m and long jump for the 2024 Summer Paralympics. In the 100 metres, he made it to the semifinals. In the long jump, Ye finished in 4th place with a jump of 6.29 metres, which was only 0.03 metres of a bronze medal and a China 1-2-3.
