= Mamudo Balde =

Portuguese para-athlete (born 2005)

Personal information
- Nationality: Portuguese
- Born: 7 February 2005 (age 21)

Sport
- Sport: Paralympic athletics
Medal record
Representing Portugal
World Championships
Bronze medal – third place	2025 New Delhi	100 m T54

Mamudo Balde (born 7 February 2005) is a Portuguese para-athlete who competes in the T54 classification, in the sprinting events. He has medalled at the World Championships and competed in the Summer Paralympics in 2024.

== Career ==
Balde represented Portugal at the 2024 Summer Paralympics in 2024 and competed in two events. In the 400 metres, he was assigned to Heat 2 and was disqualified for lane infringement. He then competed in the 100 metres, where he finished in fifth place in the final.

Balde competed at two events in the 2025 World Para Athletics Championships. He competed in the 400 metres and finished in fifth place. He then competed in the 100 metres and won the bronze medal.
