= Eddy Bernard =

Malaysian para-athlete (born 2001)

Personal information
- Nationality: Malaysian
- Born: 12 January 2001 (age 25) Beluran, Sabah

Sport
- Sport: Track and field
- Disability class: T44
- Coached by: Hamberi Mahat
Medal record
Men's para-athletics
Representing Malaysia
Paralympic Games
Bronze medal – third place	2024 Paris	100 m T44
World Championships
Silver medal – second place	2024 Kobe	100 m T44
Asian Para Games
Gold medal – first place	2018 Jakarta	Long jump T44/62/64
Silver medal – second place	2022 Hangzhou	100 m T44
ASEAN Para Games
Gold medal – first place	2017 Kuala Lumpur	100 m T37
Gold medal – first place	2017 Kuala Lumpur	Long jump T37
Gold medal – first place	2022 Surakarta	Long jump T44
Gold medal – first place	2023 Cambodia	100 m T44
Gold medal – first place	2023 Cambodia	Long jump T42/43/44
Silver medal – second place	2022 Surakarta	100 m T44/62/64
Asian Youth Para Games
Gold medal – first place	2017 Dubai	100 m T38
Gold medal – first place	2017 Dubai	Long jump T35/38

Eddy Bernard (born 12 January 2001) is a Malaysian sprint and long jump para-athlete and Paralympic athlete. He represented Malaysia at the 2024 Summer Paralympics where he won a bronze medal in the men's 100 metres T44 event.

== Early life ==
A native of Beluran in Sabah, Eddy was born with a small right leg and a disjointed finger. He attended SMK Beluran in Sabah, and frequently involved in school sporting events.
