= Mohamad Othman =

Emirati Paralympic athlete (born 2004)

Personal information
- Nationality: Emirati
- Born: 26 January 2004 (age 22) Dubai, United Arab Emirates

Sport
- Sport: Para-athletics
- Disability class: T34
- Event(s): 100 metres 400 metres 800 metres
Medal record
Para-athletics
Representing United Arab Emirates
World Championships
Bronze medal – third place	2025 New Delhi	100 m T34

Mohammed Youssef Othman (born 26 January 2004) is an Emirati T34 Paralympic wheelchair racer. He represented the United Arab Emirates at the 2024 Summer Paralympics.

== Career ==
In October 2023, at the delayed 2022 Asian Para Games, Othman competed in the 100 m event and finished in sixth place.

At the 2024 World Para Athletics Championships, Othman competed in the 100 metres and 800 metres, where he finished in fourth place in the former. He then represented the United Arab Emirates at the 2024 Summer Paralympics in the 100 metres and 800 metres T34 events, where he reached the final in the former and finished in fifth place.

In February 2025, at the Fazza Para Athletics Grand Prix, Othman won the gold medal in the 100 m and the bronze medal in the 400 m and 800 m. At the 2025 World Para Athletics Championships in New Delhi, he won the bronze medal in the 100 metres, marking his first medal at the World Championships.
