= Thomas Young (sprinter) =

British Paralympic athlete (born 2000)

Thomas Young MBE
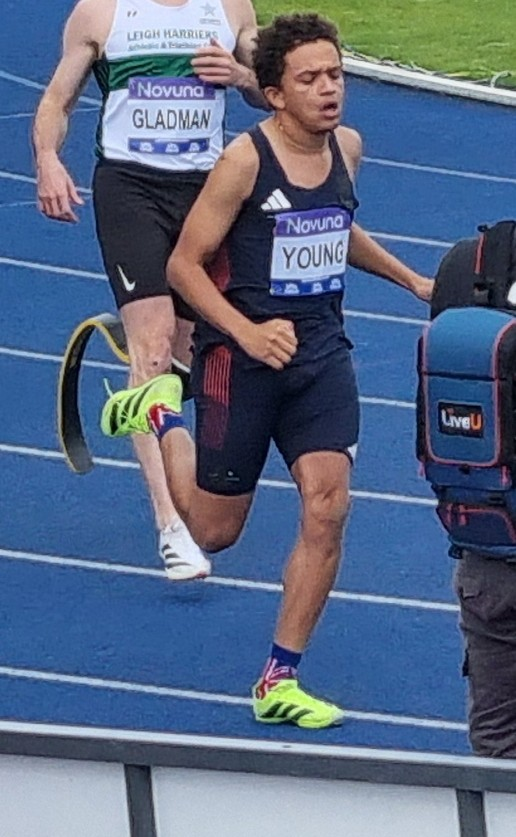
- 2025 UK Athletics Championships

Personal information
- Born: 27 July 2000 (age 26) Croydon, England, Great Britain

Sport
- Country: Great Britain
- Sport: Paralympic athletics
- Disability: Neurofibromatosis type 1
- Disability class: T38
- Events: 100 metres 200 metres
- Club: Charnwood
- Coached by: Joe McDonnell
Medal record
Men's para athletics
Representing Great Britain
Paralympic Games
Gold medal – first place	2020 Tokyo	100m T38
World Championships
Silver medal – second place	2019 Doha	100m T38
Silver medal – second place	2024 Kobe	100m T38
Bronze medal – third place	2025 New Delhi	100m T38
European Championships
Gold medal – first place	2018 Berlin	100m T38
Gold medal – first place	2018 Berlin	200m T38
Gold medal – first place	2021 Bydgoszcz	100m T38
Commonwealth Games
Gold medal – first place	2026 Glasgow	100 m T38

Thomas Robert Young (born 27 July 2000) is a British Paralympic athlete who competes in sprinting events at international events, he is a Paralympic Games gold medallist, three-time European champion and a two-time World silver medalist.

== Career ==
At the 2019 World Para Athletics Championships, he won silver in the T38 100 metres.

He won the gold medal in the men's 100 metres T38 event at the 2020 Summer Paralympics in Tokyo, Japan. He also won the 100 metres mixed class event at the 2021 British Athletics Championships.

Young was appointed Member of the Order of the British Empire (MBE) in the 2022 New Year Honours for services to athletics.

At the 2023 World Para Athletics Championships, he came 7th in the 100 metres. The following year at the 2024 World Para Athletics Championships, he won silver in the 100 metres.

At the 2024 Summer Paralympics, he narrowly missed out on a medal, coming in 4th place in the 100 metres T38.

In 2025, Young competed at the World Para Athletics Championships in New Delhi. He won the bronze medal in the men's T38 100m
