= Yang Yifei =

Chinese Paralympic athlete

Yifei Yang
Personal information
- Nationality: Chinese
- Born: 11 October 1991 (age 34) Guangdong, China

Sport
- Sport: Paralympic athletics
- Disability class: T36
Medal record
Representing China
Men's Paralympic athletics
Paralympic Games
Silver medal – second place	2016 Rio de Janeiro	100 m T36
Bronze medal – third place	2024 Paris	100 m T36
World Championships
Gold medal – first place	2017 London	100 m T36
Silver medal – second place	2019 Dubai	100m T36
Silver medal – second place	2019 Dubai	4x100m relay
Silver medal – second place	2024 Kobe	100 m T36
Bronze medal – third place	2025 New Delhi	100 m T36
Asian Para Games
Gold medal – first place	2022 Hangzhou	Long jump T36
Silver medal – second place	2018 Jakarta	100 m T36
Silver medal – second place	2022 Hangzhou	100 m T36

Yifei Yang (born 11 October 1991) is a Chinese sprint runner.

== Career ==
Yang won a silver medal in the 100 metres T36 event at the 2016 Summer Paralympics, with a time of 12.20 seconds.
