= Joel de Jong =

Dutch Paralympic athlete (born 2002)

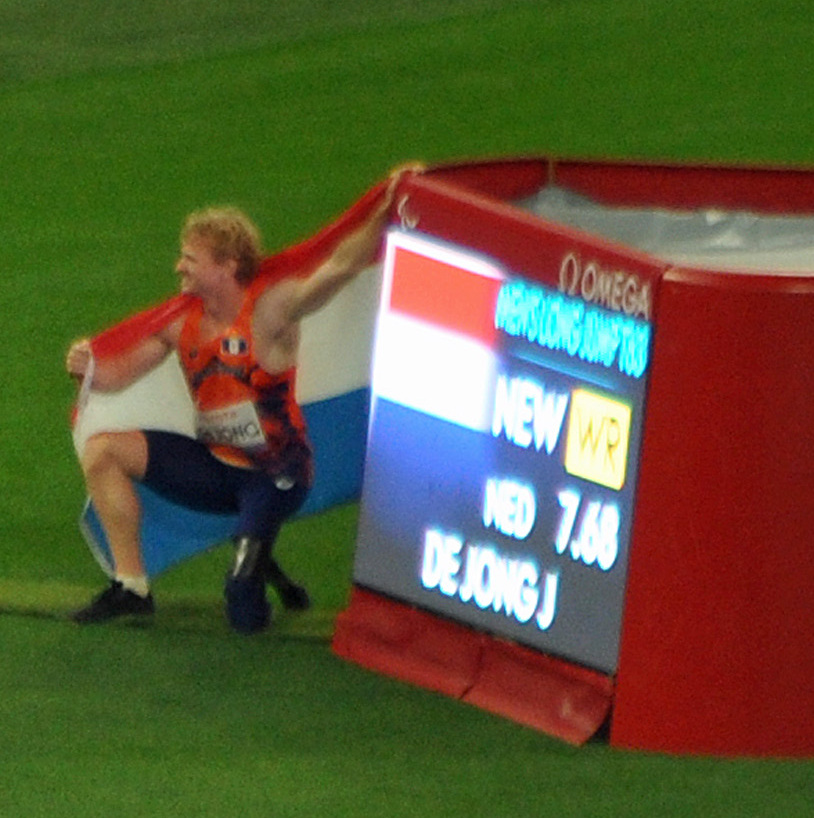
- Joel de Jong at the 2024 Summer Paralympics

Personal information
- Nationality: Dutch
- Born: 17 January 2002 (age 24) Sneek, Netherlands

Sport
- Sport: Para-athletics
- Disability class: T63
Medal record
Men's para-athletics
Representing Netherlands
Paralympic Games
Gold medal – first place	2024 Paris	Long jump T63
World Championships
Gold medal – first place	2023 Paris	100 m T63
Gold medal – first place	2025 New Delhi	Long jump T63
Silver medal – second place	2024 Kobe	Long jump T63
Bronze medal – third place	2023 Paris	Long jump T63
Bronze medal – third place	2024 Kobe	100 m T63

Joel de Jong (born 17 January 2002) is a Dutch para-athlete. He represented the Netherlands at the 2024 Summer Paralympics.

== Career ==
De Jong represented the Netherlands at the 2024 World Para Athletics Championships and won a silver medal in the long jump T63 and a bronze medal in 100 metres T63 events.

He represented the Netherlands at the 2024 Summer Paralympics and won a gold medal in the long jump T63 event with a world record jump of 7.68 metres, surpassing his previous world record of 7.67 metres.
