= Shuta Kawakami =

Japanese Paralympic athlete (born 1998)

Personal information
- Nationality: Japanese
- Born: 22 November 1998 (age 27) Fukui, Japan

Sport
- Sport: Para-athletics
- Disability class: T13
- Event: 100 metres
Medal record
Para-athletics
Representing Japan
Paralympic Games
Bronze medal – third place	2024 Paris	100 m T13
World Championships
Gold medal – first place	2025 New Delhi	100 m T13
Silver medal – second place	2024 Kobe	100 m T13
Asian Para Games
Bronze medal – third place	2026 Aichi–Nagoya	100 m T13

Shuta Kawakami (born 22 November 1998) is a Japanese T13 Paralympic sprint runner. He represented Japan at the 2024 Summer Paralympics.

== Career ==
Kawakami represented Japan at the 2024 World Para Athletics Championships and won a silver medal in the 100 metres T13 event with an Asian record time of 10.70 seconds.

He represented Japan at the 2024 Summer Paralympics and won a bronze medal in the 100 metres T13 event. He competed at the 2025 World Para Athletics Championships and won a gold medal in the 100 metres T13 event.
