= Shreyansh Trivedi =

Indian Paralympian track and field athlete (born 2005)

Personal information
- Born: 8 December 2005 (age 20) Lucknow, Uttar Pradesh, India

Sport
- Country: India
- Sport: Para-athletics
- Disability class: T37
- Coached by: Amit Khanna
Medal record
Representing India
Asian Para Games
Bronze medal – third place	2022 Hangzhou	100m - T37
Bronze medal – third place	2022 Hangzhou	200m - T37

Shreyansh Trivedi (born 8 December 2005) is an Indian Paralympian, Track Athlete. He primarily competes in 100m and 200m in the T37 category. He won two Bronze at the 2022 Asian Para Games in Hangzhou.

Trivedi hails from Lucknow, Uttar Pradesh. He started his athletics journey in 2019 by winning Gold at his debut National.

He won two Bronze medals at the 2022 Asian Para Games at Hangzhou, China in October 2023.

== See also ==
- Athletics in India
- India at the 2022 Asian Para Games
