= Nuwan Indika (athlete) =

Sri Lankan para athlete

Personal information
- Full name: Nuwan Indika Gamage
- National team: Sri Lanka
- Employer: Sri Lanka Army

Sport
- Country: Sri Lanka
- Sport: Para-athletics
- Disability class: T44, T64
Medal record
Men's para-athletics
Representing Sri Lanka
World Championships
Bronze medal – third place	2024 Kobe	100 m T44
Bronze medal – third place	2025 New Delhi	Long jump T44
Asian Para Games
Gold medal – first place	2022 Hangzhou	100m
Silver medal – second place	2018 Jakarta	long jump
Silver medal – second place	2022 Hangzhou	long jump
Silver medal – second place	2026 Aichi-Nagoya	100m T44

Nuwan Indika Gamage also spelt as Nuwandika Indika is a Sri Lankan para sprinter and long jumper. He served in the Sri Lanka Light Infantry which is considered as the oldest regiment in the Sri Lanka Army.

== Career ==
He claimed a silver medal in the men's long jump event at the 2018 Asian Para Games in Jakarta and Sri Lanka eventually finished the 2018 Asian Para Games on a high note with a medal tally of 14 medals and finished at 14th position. Indika clinched the silver medal with a jump clearing 6.09m in his sixth attempt in the men's long jump final.

He secured three gold medals at the 2019 National Para Championships which was held at the Sugathadasa Stadium and he was adjudged the men's best athlete during the competition alongside Buddhika Indrapal. He was also a member of the Sri Lankan squad which competed at the 2019 World Para Athletics Championship.

Nuwan Indika was named in Sri Lankan squad ahead of the 2021 World Para Athletics Grand Prix. He competed at the 2022 Indian Open National Para Athletics Championship and he claimed a silver medal in the men's 100m T44 category.

He was part of the Sri Lankan contingent which took part at the 2023 World Para Athletics Grand Prix. He secured a silver medal in the men's 100m T44 category during the 2023 World Para Athletics Grand Prix.

In October 2023, he claimed a gold medal in the men's 100m T44 category at the 2022 Asian Para Games with a new Asian Para Games record timing of 11.63 seconds. During the 2022 Asian Para Games, he also clinched a silver medal in the men's long jump T64 category and he also established a new Asian record in T64 classification in men's long jump by clearing 6.68m.
