= Deng Peicheng =

Chinese Paralympic athlete

Personal information
- Born: 30 May 1996 (age 30) Guangdong, China

Sport
- Country: China
- Sport: Para-athletics
- Disability class: T36
Medal record
Paralympic Games
Gold medal – first place	2020 Tokyo	100 m T36
World Championships
Gold medal – first place	2024 Kobe	100 m T36
Silver medal – second place	2025 New Delhi	100 m T36
Asian Para Games
Gold medal – first place	2022 Hangzhou	100 m T36
Gold medal – first place	2022 Hangzhou	400 m T36
Bronze medal – third place	2022 Hangzhou	Long jump T36

Deng Peicheng (born 30 May 1996) is a Chinese Paralympic athlete.

== Career ==
He won a gold medal in the men's 100 metres T36 event at the 2020 Summer Paralympics held in Tokyo, Japan. He also set a new T36 Paralympic record of 11.85 seconds.
