= Hu Yang =

Chinese paralympic athlete

Personal information
- Native name: 胡洋
- Born: 1 May 1997 (age 29)

Sport
- Country: China
- Sport: Para-athletics
- Disability class: T54

Achievements and titles
- Personal best: 400 m: 44.98 (2024)
Medal record
Para-athletics
Representing China
Paralympic Games
Gold medal – first place	2024 Paris	4×100 m mixed relay
World Championships
Gold medal – first place	2023 Paris	400 m T54
Gold medal – first place	2024 Kobe	400 m T54
Silver medal – second place	2024 Kobe	800 m T54
Silver medal – second place	2025 New Delhi	100 m T54
Bronze medal – third place	2023 Paris	100 m T54
Asian Para Games
Gold medal – first place	2022 Hangzhou	800m T54
Silver medal – second place	2018 Jakarta	100m T54
Silver medal – second place	2022 Hangzhou	400m T54
Bronze medal – third place	2022 Hangzhou	1500m T54

Hu Yang ( Chinese: 胡洋)(born 1 May 1997) is a Chinese T54 Paralympic athlete. He competed at the 2024 Summer Paralympics, winning the gold medal in the mixed 4 × 100 m universal relay event.
