= Korban Best =

American Paralympic sprinter

Personal information
- Born: July 19, 2003 (age 23)
- Home town: Southlake, Texas, U.S.

Sport
- Sport: Paralympic athletics
- Disability: ulnar dysplasia
- Disability class: T47
- Event: Sprints
Medal record
Paralympic athletics
Representing the United States
Paralympic Games
Silver medal – second place	2024 Paris	100 m T47
Bronze medal – third place	2024 Paris	mixed 4×100 m relay

Korban Best (born July 19, 2003) is an American T47 Paralympic sprint runner. He represented the United States at the 2024 Summer Paralympics.

== Career ==
Best represented the United States at the 2024 Summer Paralympics in the 100 metres T47 event and won a silver medal.

== Personal life ==
Best was born with ulnar dysplasia in his right arm.
