= Isaac Jean-Paul =

American Paralympic athlete (born 1993)

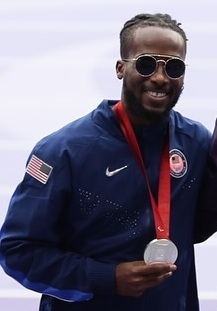
- Jean-Paul at the 2024 Summer Paralympics

Personal information
- Born: February 4, 1993 (age 33) Gurnee, Illinois, U.S.

Sport
- Country: United States
- Sport: Para-athletics
- Disability: Vision impairment
- Disability class: T13
- Events: High jump; Long jump
Medal record
Men's para-athletics
Representing United States
Paralympic Games
Silver medal – second place	2024 Paris	Long jump T13
Bronze medal – third place	2020 Tokyo	Long jump T13
World Championships
Gold medal – first place	2017 London	High jump T13
Gold medal – first place	2023 Paris	Long jump T13
Silver medal – second place	2019 Dubai	Long jump T13
Bronze medal – third place	2017 London	Long jump T13

Isaac Jean-Paul (born February 4, 1993) is a visually impaired American Paralympic athlete competing in high jump and long jump events. He is a two-time medalist in the men's long jump T13 event at the Paralympic Games. He is also a four-time medalist, including two gold medals, at the World Para Athletics Championships.

== Career ==
In 2017, Jean-Paul set a new world record of 2.17 m in the men's high jump T13 event at the World Para Athletics Championships held in London, United Kingdom. He also won the bronze medal in the men's long jump T13 event.

In 2019, Jean-Paul qualified to represent the United States at the 2020 Summer Paralympics after winning the silver medal in the men's long jump T13 event at the 2019 World Para Athletics Championships held in Dubai, United Arab Emirates. In this event, he also set a new personal best of 7.18m. Jean-Paul won the bronze medal in the men's long jump T13 event at the 2020 Summer Paralympics held in Tokyo, Japan.

In 2023, he won the gold medal in the men's long jump T13 event at the World Para Athletics Championships held in Paris, France.
