= Frame running =

Disability athletics discipline using a wheeled frame

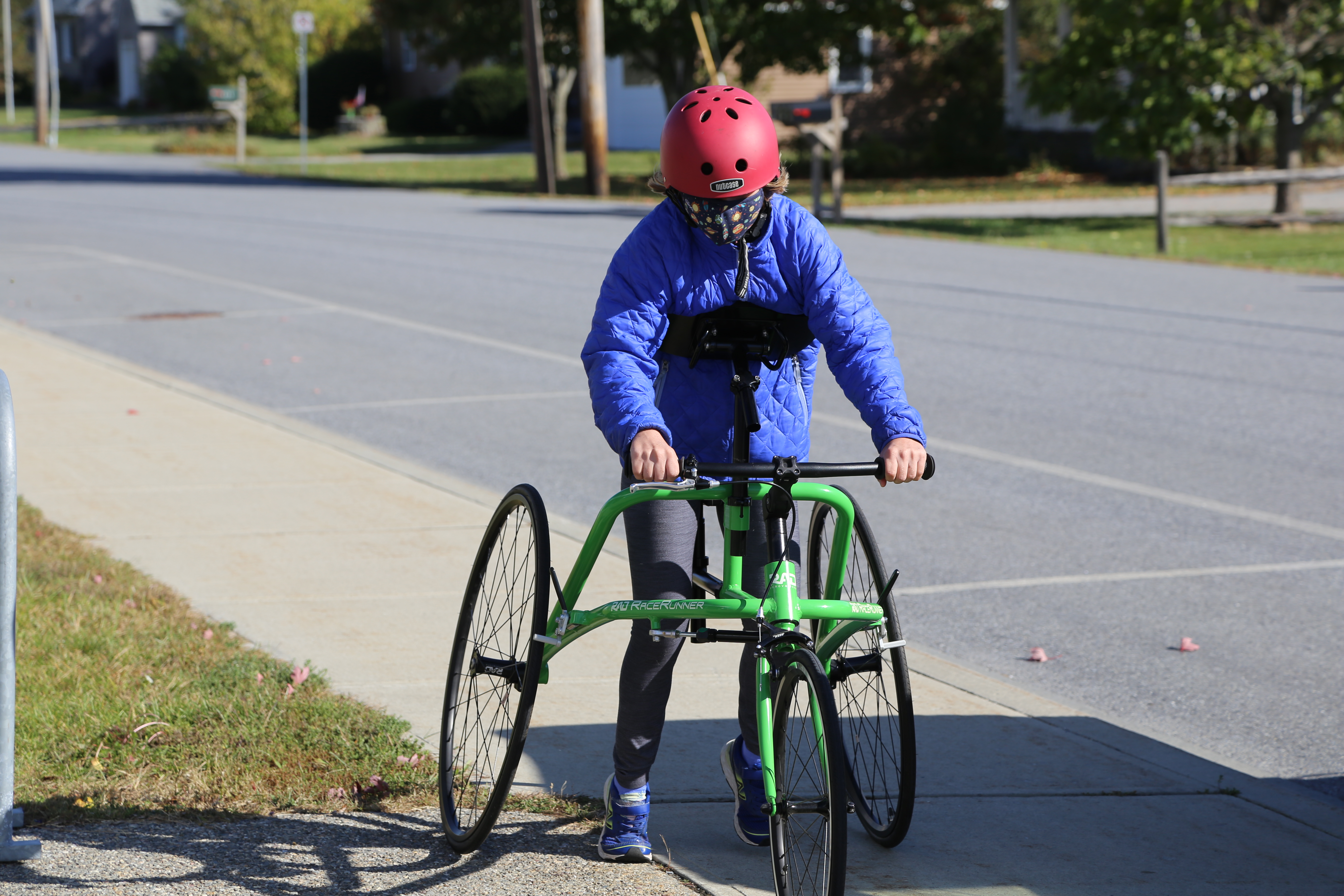
A girl walking with a RAD-Innovations RaceRunner frame.

Frame running, previously known as RaceRunning, is an adaptive athletic discipline, primarily for people with severe coordination and balance impairments such as cerebral palsy and Multiple Sclerosis. Athletes use a three-wheeled running frame, with a saddle, body support and most notably, no pedals. Athletes run over distances similar to other track and road running disciplines; 100, 200, 400, 800 meters as well as 5 kilometers, 10 kilometers, half and full marathons. Like running more generally, frame running can be competitive, recreational, or for health and fitness.

Frame running was created in Denmark in 1991 by Paralympian Connie Hansen and Mansoor Siddiqi, a former CP2L backwards wheelchair foot pushing athlete and currently the international frame running coordinator. It has since been developed in partnership with the Cerebral Palsy International Sports and Recreation Association.

== History ==
In 1997, the first frame running development camp and cup was held in Copenhagen, Denmark. This became an annual event. The 25th edition of the Camp and Cup was held in 2022, with athletes from 14 countries represented.

Frame running has been contested at the CPISRA World Games since 2005, and at the IWAS World Games since 2011.

In 2017, frame running was announced as a World Para Athletics track discipline, alongside ambulant running and wheelchair racing. 100m frame running events were contested at the 2018 and 2021 World Para Athletics European Championships, and at the 2019 World Para Athletics Championships. Frame running was unsuccessfully proposed for inclusion in the 2024 Summer Paralympics. It was, however, included in the program for the 2023 World Para Athletics Championships.

== International Frame Running ==
Frame Running clubs exist in countries around the world including the United States, Australia, Portugal, Denmark, Netherlands, the UK, Poland, Lithuania, and others. Frame Running is very popular in the United States but some other countries are attempting to incorporate it into their athletics. Canada, in an attempt to launch frame running in Toronto, started a Pilot Program. The Canadian Cerebral Palsy Sports Association (CCPSA) was responsible for this program being started but also worked with an education program.

== Running frames ==
Running frames help athletes to compete by supporting their body and keeping them stable with three wheels, similar to a tricycle. The most common frames come from the company RAD Racerunner. The frames themselves in terms of structure and overall shape are very similar. The designs or smaller aspects such as color can be customized.
