= Athletics at the 2020 Summer Paralympics – Men's 100 metres =

Athletics – Men's 100 metres at the XVI Paralympic Games
- Venue: Tokyo National Stadium
- Dates: 27 August – 4 September 2021
- No. of events: 16
- Competitors: 194 from 64 nations

The Men's 100m athletics events for the 2020 Summer Paralympics took place at the Tokyo National Stadium from 27 August to 4 September 2021. A total of 16 events were contested over this distance. T11 and T12 events were hosted over three rounds, to accommodate sighted guides, while the T51 event was held as a straight final. All other 100 metre events consisted of semifinal round and final.

== Schedule ==
R	Round 1	½	Semifinals	F	Final

Date	Fri 27		Sat 28		Sun 29		Mon 30		Tue 31		Wed 1		Thu 2		Fri 3		Sat 4	
Event	M	E	M	E	M	E	M	E	M	E	M	E	M	E	M	E	M	E
T11 100m											R	½		F				
T12 100m	R		½			F												
T13 100m					R	F												
T33 100m							F											
T34 100m					R		F											
T35 100m							R	F										
T36 100m																R	F	
T37 100m	R	F																
T38 100m			R	F														
T47 100m	R	F																
T51 100m																	F	
T52 100m														R	F			
T53 100m											R	F						
T54 100m											R	F						
T63 100m						R		F										
T64 100m						R		F										

== Medal summary ==
The following is a summary of the medals awarded across all 100 metres events.

Classification	Gold		Silver		Bronze	
T11	Greece; Athanasios Ghavelas; Guide: Sotirios Gkaragkanis	10.82 WR	France; Timothée Adolphe; Guide: Bruno Naprix	10.90	China; Di Dongdong; Guide: Lian Jiageng	11.03 AR
T12	Salum Ageze Kashafali; Norway	10.43 WR	Noah Malone; United States	10.66	Roman Tarasov; RPC	10.88
T13	Jason Smyth; Ireland	10.53	Skander Djamil Athmani; Algeria	10.54 AR	Jean Carlos Mina Aponzá; Colombia	10.64 AR
T33	Andrew Small; Great Britain	17.73	Ahmad Al-Mutairi; Kuwait	17.83	Harri Jenkins; Great Britain	18.55
T34	Walid Ktila; Tunisia	15.01 GR	Rheed McCracken; Australia	15.37	Mohamed Alhammadi; United Arab Emirates	15.66
T35	Dmitrii Safronov; RPC	11.39 WR	Ihor Tsvietov; Ukraine	11.47	Artem Kalashian; RPC	11.75
T36	Deng Peicheng; China	11.85 GR	James Turner; Australia	12.00	Alexis Sebastian Chavez; Argentina	12.02
T37	Nick Mayhugh; United States	10.95 WR	Andrei Vdovin; RPC	11.18 AR	Saptoyoga Purnomo; Indonesia	11.31 AR
T38	Thomas Young; Great Britain	10.94 AR	Zhu Dening; China	11.00	Evan O'Hanlon; Australia	11.00
T47	Petrúcio Ferreira; Brazil	10.53 GR	Michał Derus; Poland	10.61 AR	Washington Júnior; Brazil	10.68
T51	Peter Genyn; Belgium	20.33 GR	Toni Piispanen; Finland	20.68	Roger Habsch; Belgium	20.76
T52	Raymond Martin; United States	16.99	Yuki Oya; Japan	17.18	Leonardo de Jesús Pérez Juárez; Mexico	17.44
T53	Pongsakorn Paeyo; Thailand	14.20 GR	Brent Lakatos; Canada	14.55	Abdulrahman Al-Qurashi; Saudi Arabia	14.76
T54	Athiwat Paeng-nuea; Thailand	13.76 AR	Leo-Pekka Tähti; Finland	13.85	Juan Pablo Cervantes García; Mexico	13.87
T63	Anton Prokhorov; RPC	12.04 WR	Vinícius Gonçalves Rodrigues; Brazil	12.05 GR	Léon Schäfer; Germany	12.22
T64	Felix Streng; Germany	10.76	Sherman Guity; Costa Rica	10.78	Johannes Floors; Germany	10.79 GR
T64	Felix Streng; Germany	10.76	Sherman Guity; Costa Rica	10.78	Jonnie Peacock; Great Britain	10.79

== Results ==
The following were the results of the finals only of each of the Men's 100 metres events in each of the classifications. Further details of each event, including where appropriate heats and semi finals results, are available on that event's dedicated page.

=== T11 ===
The T11 category is for athletes with a visual impairment. A T11 athlete may be entirely without sight, or be able to perceive light, but have no ability to see the shape of a hand at any distance. T11 athletes commonly run with guides.

The final in this classification took place on 2 September 2021, at 19:10:

Rank	Lane	Name	Nationality	Time	Notes
1st place, gold medalist(s)	3	Athanasios Ghavelas	Greece	10.82	WR
2nd place, silver medalist(s)	5	Timothée Adolphe	France	10.90	PB
3rd place, bronze medalist(s)	7	Di Dongdong	China	11.03	AR
	1	Ananias Shikongo	Namibia	DQ	WPA 7.9.3

=== T12 ===
The T12 category is for athletes with visual impairment. Athletes in this category will generally have some residual sight, the ability to recognise the shape of a hand at a distance of 2 metres and the ability to perceive clearly will be no more than 2/60. T12 athletes commonly run with guides.

The final in this classification took place on 29 August 2021, at 21:04:

Rank	Lane	Name	Nationality	Time	Notes
1st place, gold medalist(s)	3	Salum Ageze Kashafali	Norway	10.43	WR
2nd place, silver medalist(s)	5	Noah Malone	United States	10.66	
3rd place, bronze medalist(s)	1	Roman Tarasov	RPC	10.88	
4	7	Joeferson Marinho	Brazil	11.24	

=== T13 ===
The T13 category is for athletes with a moderate visual impairment. Athletes in this category have a variety of visual impairments, but can typically recognize contours from a distance of 2 to 6 metres. Athletes in this category do not typically require a guide.

The final in this classification took place on 29 August 2021, at 19:53:

Rank	Lane	Name	Nationality	Time	Notes
1st place, gold medalist(s)	6	Jason Smyth	Ireland	10.53	SB
2nd place, silver medalist(s)	7	Skander Djamil Athmani	Algeria	10.54	AR
3rd place, bronze medalist(s)	8	Jean Carlos Mina Aponzá	Colombia	10.64	AR
4	4	Isaac Jean-Paul	United States	10.83	PB
5	9	Chad Perris	Australia	10.84	
6	5	Johannes Nambala	Namibia	10.93	SB
7	2	Philipp Handler	Switzerland	11.02	
8	3	Zak Skinner	Great Britain	11.08	

=== T33 ===
The T33 category is for wheelchair athletes with cerebral palsy. Athletes in this class have moderate quadriplegia, and difficulty with forward trunk movement. They also may have hypertonia, ataxia and athetosis.

The final in this classification took place on 30 August 2021, at 10:33:

Rank	Lane	Name	Nationality	Time	Notes
1st place, gold medalist(s)	4	Andrew Small	Great Britain	17.73	
2nd place, silver medalist(s)	5	Ahmad Al-Mutairi	Kuwait	17.83	SB
3rd place, bronze medalist(s)	6	Harri Jenkins	Great Britain	18.55	SB
4	7	James Freeman	Great Britain	19.69	
5	3	Yuhei Yasuno	Japan	22.34	

=== T34 ===
The T34 category is for wheelchair athletes with cerebral palsy. Athletes in this category have minimal limitations or control problems in their arms and trunk while pushing a wheelchair.

The final in this classification took place on 30 August 2021, at 10:43:

Rank	Lane	Name	Nationality	Time	Notes
1st place, gold medalist(s)	5	Walid Ktila	Tunisia	15.01	GR
2nd place, silver medalist(s)	3	Rheed McCracken	Australia	15.37	SB
3rd place, bronze medalist(s)	4	Mohamed Alhammadi	United Arab Emirates	15.66	SB
4	1	Wang Yang	China	15.80	PB
5	8	Henry Manni	Finland	15.84	
6	7	Chaiwat Rattana	Thailand	15.87	SB
7	6	Austin Smeenk	Canada	15.92	
8	2	Ahmed Nawad	United Arab Emirates	15.99	PB
9	9	Ben Rowlings	Great Britain	16.77	

=== T35 ===
The T35 category is for ambulant athletes with cerebral palsy. The typical T35 athlete may need assistive devices for walking. The athlete may have sufficient function to run but demonstrates poor balance.

The final in this classification took place on 30 August 2021, at 19:04:

Rank	Lane	Name	Nationality	Time	Notes
1st place, gold medalist(s)	4	Dmitrii Safronov	RPC	11.39	WR
2nd place, silver medalist(s)	6	Ihor Tsvietov	Ukraine	11.47	PB
3rd place, bronze medalist(s)	7	Artem Kalashian	RPC	11.75	PB
4	5	David Dzhatiev	RPC	11.82	PB
5	8	Fábio Bordignon	Brazil	12.54	
6	2	Hernan Barreto	Argentina	12.59	PB
7	3	Marshall Zackery	United States	13.08	

=== T36 ===
The T36 category is for ambulant athletes with cerebral palsy. These athletes do not have the capacity to remain still and they show involuntary movements with all four limbs affected. They usually walk without assistive devices.

The final in this classification took place on 4 September, at 10:38:

Rank	Lane	Name	Nationality	Time	Notes
1st place, gold medalist(s)	7	Deng Peicheng	China	11.85	GR
2nd place, silver medalist(s)	6	James Turner	Australia	12.00	
3rd place, bronze medalist(s)	4	Alexis Sebastian Chavez	Argentina	12.02	
4	5	Mohamad Ridzuan Mohamad Puzi	Malaysia	12.15	
5	9	Yang Yifei	China	12.18	
6	8	Aser Mateus Almeida	Brazil	12.32	
7	2	Evgenii Torsunov	RPC	12.49	SB
8	3	Evgenii Shvetcov	RPC	12.51	

=== T37 ===
The T37 category is for ambulant athletes with cerebral palsy. These athletes have movement and coordination problems on one half of their body. They have good ability in their dominant side of their body (ie hemiplegia).

The final in this classification took place on 27 August 2021, at 19:25:

Rank	Lane	Name	Nationality	Time	Notes
1st place, gold medalist(s)	6	Nick Mayhugh	United States	10.95	WR
2nd place, silver medalist(s)	5	Andrey Vdovin	RPC	11.18	AR
3rd place, bronze medalist(s)	7	Saptoyoga Purnomo	Indonesia	11.31	AR
4	4	Chermen Kobesov	RPC	11.32	=SB
5	9	Ricardo Gomes de Mendonça	Brazil	11.52	
6	3	Ali Alnakhli	Saudi Arabia	11.53	PB
7	8	Christian Gabriel Luis	Brazil	11.55	
8	2	Charl du Toit	South Africa	11.63	

=== T38 ===
The T38 category is for ambulant athletes with cerebral palsy. T38 athletes have the mildest form of impairment caused by cerebral palsy, often in only one limb, and not affecting the ability to run, walk or jump freely, although impairing performance. T38 athletes may suffer minor co-ordination difficulties.

The final in this classification took place on 28 August 2021, at 19:35:

Rank	Lane	Name	Nationality	Time	Notes
1st place, gold medalist(s)	7	Thomas Young	Great Britain	10.94	AR
2nd place, silver medalist(s)	5	Zhu Dening	China	11.00	=PB
3rd place, bronze medalist(s)	6	Evan O'Hanlon	Australia	11.00	SB
4	4	Dimitri Jozwicki	France	11.52	
5	9	José Lemos	Colombia		
6	8	Zhong Huanghao	China	11.63	
7	2	Farhat Chida	Tunisia	11.63	SB
8	3	Jose Rodolfo Chessani	Mexico	11.77	

=== T47 ===
The T47 category is for athletes who have a single below elbow or wrist amputation or similar disability, with normal function in both legs.

The final in this classification took place on 27 August 2021, at 19:33:

Rank	Lane	Name	Nationality	Time	Notes
1st place, gold medalist(s)	4	Petrúcio Ferreira	Brazil	10.53	PR
2nd place, silver medalist(s)	7	Michał Derus	Poland	10.61	AR
3rd place, bronze medalist(s)	6	Washington Júnior	Brazil	10.68	
4	5	Wang Hao	China	10.74	AR
5	3	Kakeru Ishida	Japan	11.05	PB
6	8	Lucas de Sousa	Brazil	11.14	
7	9	Tanner Wright	United States	11.21	
8	2	Suwaibidu Galadima	Nigeria	11.29	

=== T51 ===
The T51 category is for wheelchair athletes having spinal cord injuries, with mild weakness in shoulders, limited ability in straightening elbows and wrist function, and no finger, trunk or leg function.

The final in this classification took place on 3 September, at 20:52:

Rank	Lane	Name	Nationality	Time	Notes
1st place, gold medalist(s)	5	Peter Genyn	Belgium	20.33	GR
2nd place, silver medalist(s)	6	Toni Piispanen	Finland	20.68	
3rd place, bronze medalist(s)	7	Roger Habsch	Belgium	20.76	
4	8	Mohamed Berrahal	Algeria	21.94	SB
5	4	Edgar Navarro	Mexico	22.92	
6	9	João Correia	Portugal	24.37	
7	3	Hélder Mestre	Portugal	24.72	
8	2	Ernesto Fonseca	Costa Rica	25.13	

=== T52 ===
The T52 category is for wheelchair athletes with damage to spinal cord in the higher parts of the back, substantially impaired or no trunk function, and minimal or no leg function. Pushing power comes from elbow extensions, and appears close to normal except for use of modified gloves to compensate for grip.

The final in this classification took place on 3 September 2021, at 11:07:

Rank	Lane	Name	Nationality	Time	Notes
1st place, gold medalist(s)	4	Raymond Martin	United States	16.99	
2nd place, silver medalist(s)	5	Yuki Oya	Japan	17.18	
3rd place, bronze medalist(s)	2	Leonardo de Jesús Pérez Juárez	Mexico	17.44	PB
4	8	Sam McIntosh	Australia	17.82	
5	9	Beat Bösch	Switzerland	18.08	
6	6	Gianfranco Iannotta	United States	18.08	
7	7	Isaiah Rigo	United States	18.98	
8	3	Jerrold Mangliwan	Philippines	20.08	

=== T53 ===
The T53 category is for wheelchair athletes with normal use of arms and hands, no or limited trunk function, and no leg function.

The final in this classification took place on 1 September 2021, at 19:20:

Rank	Lane	Name	Nationality	Time	Notes
1st place, gold medalist(s)	6	Pongsakorn Paeyo	Thailand	14.20	GR
2nd place, silver medalist(s)	4	Brent Lakatos	Canada	14.55	
3rd place, bronze medalist(s)	5	Abdulrahman Al-Qurashi	Saudi Arabia	14.76	
4	9	Ariosvaldo Fernandes	Brazil	15.41	
5	8	Pierre Fairbank	France	15.41	
6	2	Pichet Krungget	Thailand	15.43	
7	7	Fahad Alganaidl	Saudi Arabia	15.48	
8	3	Vitalii Gritsenko	RPC	15.55	

=== T54 ===
The T54 category is for wheelchair athletes with no leg function, but near full arm function and reasonable to normal trunk function. Typically this may be caused by a lower spinal cord injury or spinal cord birth defect.

The final in this classification took place on 1 September 2021, at 19:30:

Rank	Lane	Name	Nationality	Time	Notes
1st place, gold medalist(s)	4	Athiwat Paeng-nuea	Thailand	13.76	AR
2nd place, silver medalist(s)	5	Leo-Pekka Tähti	Finland	13.85	
3rd place, bronze medalist(s)	7	Juan Pablo Cervantes García	Mexico	13.87	
4	6	Zhang Ying	China	14.04	
5	2	Sam Carter	Australia	14.08	SB
6	9	Hu Yang	China	14.09	
7	8	Vun van	Cambodia	14.21	PB
8	3	Kenny van Weeghel	Netherlands	14.53	

=== T63 ===
The final in this classification took place on 30 August 2021, at 20:33:

Rank	Lane	Name	Nationality	Time	Notes
1st place, gold medalist(s)	6	Anton Prokhorov	RPC	12.04	WR
2nd place, silver medalist(s)	5	Vinícius Gonçalves	Brazil	12.05	GR
3rd place, bronze medalist(s)	7	Léon Schäfer	Germany	12.22	PB
4	4	Daniel Wagner	Denmark	12.37	=SB
5	3	Scott Reardon	Australia	12.43	SB
6	9	Alessandro Ossola	Italy	12.66	
7	8	Puseletso Mabote	South Africa	12.66	
8	2	Joël de Jong	Netherlands	12.90	

=== T64 ===
The final in this classification took place on 30 August 2021, at 20:43:

Rank	Lane	Name	Nationality	Time	Notes
1st place, gold medalist(s)	7	Felix Streng	Germany	10.76	
2nd place, silver medalist(s)	6	Sherman Guity	Costa Rica	10.78	PB
3rd place, bronze medalist(s)	5	Johannes Floors	Germany	10.79	GR
3rd place, bronze medalist(s)	4	Jonnie Peacock	Great Britain	10.79	SB
5	8	Mpumelelo Mhlongo	South Africa	11.03	
6	2	Jarryd Wallace	United States	11.04	
7	3	Jonathan Gore	United States	11.08	
8	9	Hunter Woodhall	United States	11.28	
