= Athletics at the 2020 Summer Paralympics – Men's 200 metres =

Athletics – Men's 200 metres at the XVI Paralympic Games
- Venue: Tokyo National Stadium
- Dates: 31 August – 4 September 2021
- No. of events: 5
- Competitors: 42 from 23 nations

The Men's 200m athletics events for the 2020 Summer Paralympics took place at the Tokyo National Stadium from August 31 to September 4, 2021. A total of 5 events were contested over this distance.

== Schedule ==
R	Round 1	½	Semifinals	F	Final

Date	Tue 31		Wed 1		Thu 2		Fri 3		Sat 4	
Event	M	E	M	E	M	E	M	E	M	E
T35 200m							R		F	
T37 200m								R	F	
T51 200m	F									
T61 200m								F		
T64 200m									R	F

== Medal summary ==
The following is a summary of the medals awarded across all 200 metres events.

Classification	Gold		Silver		Bronze	
T35	Dmitrii Safronov; RPC	23.00 WR	Ihor Tsvietov; Ukraine	23.25	Artem Kalashian; RPC	23.75
T37	Nick Mayhugh; United States	21.91 WR	Andrey Vdovin; RPC	22.24 AR	Ricardo Gomes de Mendonça; Brazil	22.62
T51	Toni Piispanen; Finland	36.81 GR	Peter Genyn; Belgium	37.11	Roger Habsch; Belgium	38.33
T61	Ntando Mahlangu; South Africa	23.59	Richard Whitehead; Great Britain	23.99	Ali Lacin; Germany	24.64
T64	Sherman Isidro Guity Guity; Costa Rica	21.43 GR	Felix Streng; Germany	21.78	Jarryd Wallace; United States	22.09

== Results ==
The following were the results of the finals only of each of the Men's 200 metres events in each of the classifications. Further details of each event, including where appropriate heats and semi finals results, are available on that event's dedicated page.

=== T35 ===
The T35 category is for ambulant athletes with cerebral palsy. The typical T35 athlete may need assistive devices for walking. The athlete may have sufficient function to run but demonstrates poor balance.

The final in this classification took place on 4 September, at 10:18:

Rank	Lane	Name	Nationality	Time	Notes
1st place, gold medalist(s)	4	Dmitrii Safronov	RPC	23.00	WR
2nd place, silver medalist(s)	5	Ihor Tsvietov	Ukraine	23.25	
3rd place, bronze medalist(s)	6	Artem Kalashian	RPC	23.75	PB
4	3	David Dzhatiev	RPC	23.85	PB
5	8	Hernan Barreto	Argentina	26.07	
6	7	Fábio Bordignon	Brazil	26.50	SB
7	2	Marshall Zackery	United States	27.73	

=== T37 ===
The T37 category is for ambulant athletes with cerebral palsy. These athletes have movement and coordination problems on one half of their body. They have good ability in their dominant side of their body (ie hemiplegia).

The final in this classification took place on 4 September, at 10:27:

Rank	Lane	Name	Nationality	Time	Notes
1st place, gold medalist(s)	6	Nick Mayhugh	United States	21.91	WR
2nd place, silver medalist(s)	4	Andrey Vdovin	RPC	22.24	AR
3rd place, bronze medalist(s)	5	Ricardo Gomes de Mendonça	Brazil	22.62	PB
4	7	Chermen Kobesov	RPC	22.85	PB
5	9	Michał Kotkowski	Poland	23.12	PB
6	8	Saptoyoga Purnomo	Indonesia	23.27	PB
7	3	Ali Alnakhli	Saudi Arabia	23.29	PB
8	2	Christian Luis	Brazil	23.49	

=== T51 ===
The T51 category is for wheelchair athletes having spinal cord injuries, with mild weakness in shoulders, limited ability in straightening elbows and wrist function, and no finger, trunk or leg function.

The final in this classification took place on 31 August 2021, at 10:18:

Rank	Lane	Name	Nationality	Time	Notes
1st place, gold medalist(s)	6	Toni Piispanen	Finland	36.81	GR
2nd place, silver medalist(s)	5	Peter Genyn	Belgium	37.11	
3rd place, bronze medalist(s)	3	Roger Habsch	Belgium	38.33	
4	8	Mohamed Berrahal	Algeria	40.04	AR
5	4	Edgar Navarro	Mexico	41.04	SB
6	7	Helder Mestre	Portugal	42.75	SB
7	2	Ernesto Fonseca	Costa Rica	47.95	

=== T61 ===
The final in this classification took place on 3 September 2021, at 19:42:

Rank	Lane	Name	Nationality	Time	Notes
1st place, gold medalist(s)	5	Ntando Mahlangu	South Africa	23.59	
2nd place, silver medalist(s)	6	Richard Whitehead	Great Britain	23.99	SB
3rd place, bronze medalist(s)	7	Ali Lacin	Germany	24.64	SB
4	3	Luis Puertas	United States	25.40	AR
5	4	Regas Woods	United States	26.74	SB

=== T64 ===
The final in this classification took place on 4 September 2021, at 20:15:

Rank	Lane	Name	Nationality	Time	Notes
1st place, gold medalist(s)	6	Sherman Isidro Guity Guity	Costa Rica	21.43	GR
2nd place, silver medalist(s)	4	Felix Streng	Germany	21.78	SB
3rd place, bronze medalist(s)	5	Jarryd Wallace	United States	22.09	SB
4	7	Jonathan Gore	United States	22.66	
5	8	Mpumelelo Mhlongo	South Africa	22.86	
6	2	Michail Seitis	Greece	22.87	SB
7	9	Levi Vloet	Netherlands	23.10	
8	3	Kengo Oshima	Japan	23.62	PB
