= Athletics at the 2020 Summer Paralympics – Men's 200 metres T35 =

Men's 200 metres T35 at the XVI Paralympic Games
- Venue: Tokyo National Stadium
- Dates: 4 September 2021 (final)
- Competitors: 7 from 5 nations
- Winning time: 23.00

Medalists
1st place, gold medalist(s)		Dmitrii Safronov	RPC
2nd place, silver medalist(s)		Ihor Tsvietov	Ukraine
3rd place, bronze medalist(s)		Artem Kalashian	RPC

The men's 200 metres T35 event at the 2020 Summer Paralympics in Tokyo, took place on 4 September 2021.

The T35 category is for ambulant athletes with cerebral palsy. The typical T35 athlete may need assistive devices for walking. The athlete may have sufficient function to run but demonstrates poor balance.

== Records ==
Prior to the competition, the existing records were as follows:

World Record	Ihor Tsvietov (UKR)	23.04	Dubai, United Arab Emirates	9 November 2019
Paralympic Record	Ihor Tsvietov (UKR)	25.11	Rio de Janeiro, Brazil	12 September 2016

Area	Time	Athlete	Nation
Africa	26.70	Allel Boukhalfa	Algeria
America	25.59	Hernan Barreto	Argentina
Asia	26.21	Fu Xinhan	China
Europe	23.04 WR	Ihor Tsvietov	Ukraine
Oceania	28.78	Jacob Phillips	New Zealand

== Results ==
The final took place on 4 September, at 10:18:

Rank	Lane	Name	Nationality	Time	Notes
1st place, gold medalist(s)	4	Dmitrii Safronov	RPC	23.00	WR
2nd place, silver medalist(s)	5	Ihor Tsvietov	Ukraine	23.25	
3rd place, bronze medalist(s)	6	Artem Kalashian	RPC	23.75	PB
4	3	David Dzhatiev	RPC	23.85	PB
5	8	Hernan Barreto	Argentina	26.07	
6	7	Fábio da Silva Bordignon	Brazil	26.50	SB
7	2	Marshall Zackery	United States	27.73	
