= 2019 World Para Athletics Championships – Men's 100 metres =

The men's 100 metres at the 2019 World Para Athletics Championships was held in Dubai from 7–15 November.

== Medalists ==
Event	Gold		Silver		Bronze	
T11	Lucas Prado; Guide: Anderson Machado dos Santos; Brazil	10.95 CR	Timothee Adolphe; Guide: Bruno Naprix; France	11.03 AR	Felipe Gomes; Guide: Jonas Silva; Brazil	11.14 SB
T12	Salum Ageze Kashafali; Norway	10.54 CR	Jefferson Marinho de Oliveira; Brazil	10.77	Fabrício Júnior Barros Ferreira; Brazil	10.84
T13	Jason Smyth; Ireland	10.54 CR	Chad Perris; Australia	10.86 SB	Johannes Nambala; Namibia	10.08
T33	Ahmad Almutairi; Kuwait	17.08	Andrew Small; United Kingdom	17.71	Harri Jenkins; United Kingdom	18.98
T34	Walid Ktila; Tunisia	14.99	Rheed McCracken; Australia	15.51	Mohamed Alhammadi; United Arab Emirates	15.93
T35	Ihor Tsvietov; Ukraine	11.77 WR	Artem Kalashian; Russia	11.93 PB	Dmitrii Safronov; Russia	12.03 SB
T36	James Turner; Australia	11.72 WR	Yifei Yang; China	11.79 AR	Mohamad Ridzuan Mohamad Puzi; Malaysia	11.97
T37	Andrey Vdovin; Russia	11.18	Chermen Kobesov; Russia	11.32	Saptoyoga Purnomo; Indonesia	11.41
T38	Dening Zhu; China	11.00 PB	Thomas Young; United Kingdom	11.00 AR	Evan O'Hanlon; Australia	11.05 SB
T47	Petrúcio Ferreira dos Santos; Brazil	10.44	Washington Junior; Brazil	10.58 PB	Yohansson Nascimento; Brazil	10.69 PB
T51	Toni Piispanen; Finland	20.33 CR	Peter Genyn; Belgium	20.50	Edgar Navarro; Mexico	22.48
T52	Raymond Martin; United States	16.88	Gianfranco Iannotta; United States	16.96	Tomoya Ito; Japan	17.14
T53	Brent Lakatos; Canada	14.59	Adbulrahmen Alqurashi; Saudi Arabia	14.93	Pongsakorn Paeyo; Thailand	14.97
T54	Leo Pekka Tahti; Finland	13.97	Yang Liu; China	14.02	Juan Pablo Cervantes García; Mexico	14.10
T63	Daniel Jorgensen; Denmark	12.32 SB	Léon Schäfer; Germany	12.34	Vinícius Gonçalves Rodrigues; Brazil	12.38
T64	Johannes Floors; Germany	10.60	Mpumelelo Mhlongo; South Africa	11.00 WR	Felix Streng; Germany	11.00
RR3						
WR world record | AR area record | CR championship record | GR games record | NR national record | OR Olympic record | PB personal best | SB season best | WL world leading (in a given season)

Events listed in pink were contested but no medals were awarded.

== T11 ==
=== Records ===
World record	David Brown (USA)	10.92	Walnut, United States	18 April 2014
Championship record	Lucas Prado (BRA)	11.08	Lyon, France	25 July 2013

=== Schedule ===
The event schedule, in local time (UTC+4), was as follows:

Date	Time	Round
12 November	9:06	Round 1
12 November	18:06	Semifinals
13 November	18:36	Final

=== Round 1 ===
First 1 in each heat (Q) and the next 4 fastest (q) advance to the semifinals.

Rank	Heat	Sport Class	Name	Nationality	Time	Notes
1	4	T11	Lucas Prado; Guide: Anderson Machado Dos Santos	Brazil	11.15	Q, SB
2	3	T11	Timothée Adolphe; Guide: Bruno Naprix	France	11.21	Q, SB
3	1	T11	Di Dongdong; Guide: Lian Jiageng	China	11.22	Q
4	3	T11	Felipe Gomes; Guide: Jonas Silva	Brazil	11.28	q
5	2	T11	David Brown; Guide: Jerome Avery	United States	11.32	Q
6	4	T11	Ananias Shikongo; Guide: Even Tjiviju	Namibia	11.43	q, SB
7	1	T11	Daniel Mendes da Silva; Guide: Wendel de Souza	Brazil	11.46	q
8	4	T11	Gerard Descarrega Puigdevall; Guide: Guillermo Rojo Gil	Spain	11.47	q, PB
9	1	T11	Peerapon Watbok; Guide: Natthaphong Phothong	Thailand	11.55	SB
10	4	T11	Chen Xingyu; Guide: Han Hongyu	China	11.58	PB
11	2	T11	Enderson Vallesteros Santos; Guide: Eubrig Maza	Venezuela	11.71	
12	2	T11	Martín Parejo Maza; Guide: Mark Ujakpor	Spain	11.80	SB
13	3	T11	Alfred Bernardo; Guide: Sydney Kamuaruuma	Namibia	11.87	PB
14	1	T11	Nurlan Ibrahimov; Guide: Ramiz Malikov	Azerbaijan	11.95	SB
15	3	T11	Suphachai Songphinit; Guide: Chinuwat Chulong	Thailand	12.09	

=== Semifinals ===
First 1 in each heat (Q) and the next 2 fastest (q) advance to the final.

Rank	Heat	Sport Class	Name	Nationality	Time	Notes
1	2	T11	Timothée Adolphe; Guide: Bruno Naprix	France	10.95	Q
2	2	T11	Di Dongdong; Guide: Lian Jiageng	China	11.00	q
3	1	T11	Lucas Prado; Guide: Anderson Machado Dos Santos	Brazil	11.02	Q, CR
4	1	T11	Felipe Gomes; Guide: Jonas Silva	Brazil	11.20	q, SB
5	2	T11	Daniel Mendes da Silva; Guide: Wendel de Souza	Brazil	11.24	
6	1	T11	David Brown; Guide: Jerome Avery	United States	11.25	
	1	T11	Gerard Descarrega Puigdevall; Guide: Guillermo Rojo Gil	Spain	DQ	
	2	T11	Ananias Shikongo; Guide: Even Tjiviju	Namibia	DQ	

=== Final ===
The final was started on 13 November at 18:36.

Rank	Lane	Sport Class	Name	Nationality	Time	Notes
1st place, gold medalist(s)	1	T11	Felipe Gomes; Guide: Jonas Silva	Brazil	10.95	CR
2nd place, silver medalist(s)	3	T11	Timothée Adolphe; Guide: Bruno Naprix	France	11.03	AR
3rd place, bronze medalist(s)	5	T11	Lucas Prado; Guide: Anderson Machado Dos Santos	Brazil	11.14	SB
4	7	T11	Di Dongdong; Guide: Lian Jiageng	China	11.20	

== T12 ==
=== Records ===
World record	Salum Ageze Kashafali (NOR)	10.45	Oslo, Norway	13 June 2019
Championship record	Leinier Savón Pineda (CUB)	10.72	London, Great Britain	15 July 2017

=== Schedule ===
The event schedule, in local time (UTC+4), was as follows:

Date	Time	Round
10 November	11:05	Round 1
11 November	9:09	Semifinals
12 November	19:57	Final

=== Round 1 ===
First 1 in each heat (Q) and the next 5 fastest (q) advance to the semifinals.

Rank	Heat	Sport Class	Name	Nationality	Time	Notes
1	2	T12	Salum Ageze Kashafali	Norway	10.77	Q
2	5	T12	Noah Malone	United States	10.84	Q
3	1	T12	Roman Tarasov	Russia	10.85	Q
4	3	T12	Fabrício Júnior Barros Ferreira	Brazil	10.86	Q
5	6	T12	Jefferson Marinho de Oliveira	Brazil	10.87	Q
6	4	T12	Kesley Teodoro	Brazil	10.96	Q
7	4	T12	Athanasios Ghavelas	Greece	11.04	q, PB
8	7	T12	Jonathan Ntutu	South Africa	11.07	Q, SB
9	3	T12	Marcel Böttger; Guide: Alexander Kosenkow	Germany	11.11	q, PB
10	3	T12	Phạm Nguyễn Khánh Minh	Vietnam	11.21	q, PB
11	4	T12	Eko Saputra	Indonesia	11.23	q, PB
12	6	T12	Ayoub Haimouda	Morocco	11.30	q, PB
13	7	T12	Hakan Cira	Turkey	11.31	PB
14	2	T12	Jaco Smit	South Africa	11.35	
15	2	T12	Shunya Yamaji	Japan	11.37	SB
16	3	T12	Muhamad Ali Hanafiah	Malaysia	11.39	SB
17	7	T12	Artem Loginov	Russia	11.41	
18	1	T12	Josiah Jamison; Guide: Jared Lane	United States	11.48	
19	5	T12	Joan Munar Martínez	Spain	11.51	
20	5	T12	Bounphet Thepthida	Laos	11.62	PB
21	7	T12	Tobias Jonsson	Sweden	11.64	SB
22	1	T12	Luís Gonçalves	Portugal	11.71	
23	6	T12	Henry Nzungi Muendo	Kenya	11.79	PB
24	4	T12	Mohamad Faizal Aideal Suhaimi	Malaysia	13.22	
	6	T12	Mansur Abdirashidov	Uzbekistan	DQ	
	5	T12	Abdeslam Hili	Morocco	DQ	
	1	T12	Mahdi Afri	Morocco	DNS	

=== Semifinals ===
First 1 in each heat (Q) and the next 1 fastest (q) advance to the final.

Rank	Heat	Sport Class	Name	Nationality	Time	Notes
1	2	T12	Salum Ageze Kashafali	Norway	10.49	Q
2	1	T12	Jefferson Marinho de Oliveira	Brazil	10.74	Q, PB
3	2	T12	Jonathan Ntutu	South Africa	10.85	q
4	1	T12	Noah Malone	United States	10.89	
5	3	T12	Fabrício Júnior Barros Ferreira	Brazil	10.90	Q
6	3	T12	Roman Tarasov	Russia	10.90	
7	3	T12	Marcel Böttger; Guide: Alexander Kosenkow	Germany	11.10	PB
8	1	T12	Athanasios Ghavelas	Greece	11.11	
9	1	T12	Eko Saputra	Indonesia	11.25	
10	2	T12	Ayoub Haimouda	Morocco	11.26	
11	3	T12	Phạm Nguyễn Khánh Minh	Vietnam	11.46	
	2	T12	Kesley Teodoro	Brazil	DNS	

=== Final ===
The final was started on 12 November at 19:57.

Rank	Lane	Sport Class	Name	Nationality	Time	Notes
1st place, gold medalist(s)	5	T12	Salum Ageze Kashafali	Norway	10.54	CR
2nd place, silver medalist(s)	3	T12	Joeferson Marinho de Oliveira	Brazil	10.77	
3rd place, bronze medalist(s)	7	T12	Fabrício Júnior Barros Ferreira	Brazil	10.84	
4	1	T12	Jonathan Ntutu	South Africa	11.01	SB

== T13 ==
=== Records ===
World record	Jason Smyth (IRL)	10.46	London, Great Britain	1 September 2012
Championship record	Jason Smyth (IRL)	10.61	Lyon, France	25 July 2013

=== Schedule ===
The event schedule, in local time (UTC+4), was as follows:

Date	Time	Round
13 November	9:45	Round 1
13 November	19:15	Final

=== Round 1 ===
First 2 in each heat (Q) and the next 2 fastest (q) advance to the final.

Rank	Heat	Sport Class	Name	Nationality	Time	Notes
1	1	T13	Jason Smyth	Ireland	10.84	Q
2	2	T13	Chad Perris	Australia	10.87	Q, SB
3	2	T13	Johannes Nambala	Namibia	10.88	Q, SB
4	1	T13	Austin Ingram	Canada	11.03	Q, PB
5	1	T13	Doniyorjon Akhmedov	Uzbekistan	11.14	q, PB
6	2	T13	Chane Hendriks	South Africa	11.15	q, PB
7	3	T13	Salah Khelaifia	Algeria	11.17	Q
8	3	T13	Jakub Nicpoń	Poland	11.18	Q
9	2	T13	Philipp Handler	Switzerland	11.28	
10	3	T13	Vahid Alinajimi	Iran	11.30	
11	2	T13	Zak Skinner	United Kingdom	11.36	
12	1	T13	Songwut Lamsan	Thailand	11.39	SB
13	1	T13	Andrei Kuzmin	Russia	11.52	
14	3	T13	Ken Thepthida	Laos	11.75	PB
15	2	T13	David Gerber	France	11.77	
16	3	T13	Eino Mushila	Namibia	11.92	SB
17	1	T13	Islam Salimov	Kazakhstan	11.99	SB
	1	T13	Iván José Cano Blanco	Spain	DQ	
	3	T13	Axel Zorzi	France	DNS	

=== Final ===
The final was started on 13 November at 19:15.

Rank	Lane	Sport Class	Name	Nationality	Time	Notes
1st place, gold medalist(s)	7	T13	Jason Smyth	Ireland	10.54	CR
2nd place, silver medalist(s)	4	T13	Chad Perris	Australia	10.86	SB
3rd place, bronze medalist(s)	5	T13	Johannes Nambala	Namibia	10.98	
4	8	T13	Austin Ingram	Canada	10.99	PB
5	3	T13	Chane Hendriks	South Africa	11.16	
6	9	T13	Jakub Nicpoń	Poland	11.17	
7	2	T13	Doniyorjon Akhmedov	Uzbekistan	11.26	
	6	T13	Salah Khelaifia	Algeria	DNF	

== T33 ==
=== Records ===
World record	Ahmad Almutairi (KUW)	16.46	Nottwil, Switzerland	3 June 2017
Championship record	Ahmad Almutairi (KUW)	17.00	London, Great Britain	15 July 2017

=== Schedule ===
The event schedule, in local time (UTC+4), was as follows:

Date	Time	Round
10 November	20:27	Final

=== Final ===
The final was started on 13 November at 19:15.

Rank	Lane	Sport Class	Name	Nationality	Time	Notes
1st place, gold medalist(s)	7	T33	Ahmad Almutairi	Kuwait	17.08	
2nd place, silver medalist(s)	4	T33	Andrew Small	United Kingdom	17.71	
3rd place, bronze medalist(s)	6	T33	Harri Jenkins	United Kingdom	18.98	
4	5	T33	Denis Schmitz	Germany	20.88	
5	8	T33	Jiang Shun	China	21.46	

== T34 ==
=== Records ===
World record	Walid Ktila (TUN)	14.46	Arbon, Switzerland	1 June 2019
Championship record	Walid Ktila (TUN)	15.00	London, Great Britain	15 July 2017

=== Schedule ===
The event schedule, in local time (UTC+4), was as follows:

Date	Time	Round
10 November	9:09	Round 1
10 November	20:19	Final

=== Round 1 ===
First 3 in each heat (Q) and the next 2 fastest (q) advance to the final.

Rank	Heat	Sport Class	Name	Nationality	Time	Notes
1	2	T34	Walid Ktila	Tunisia	14.89	Q, CR
2	1	T34	Rheed McCracken	Australia	15.42	Q
3	2	T34	Austin Smeenk	Canada	15.66	Q
4	2	T34	Chaiwat Rattana	Thailand	15.76	Q
5	1	T34	Mohamed Alhammadi	United Arab Emirates	15.85	Q
6	2	T34	Bojan Mitic	Switzerland	16.06	q, SB
7	1	T34	Mohammed Rashid Al-Kubaisi	Qatar	16.22	Q, PB
8	1	T34	Henry Manni	Finland	16.33	q
9	2	T34	Wang Yang	China	16.52	PB
10	1	T34	Stefan Rusch	Netherlands	16.67	
11	2	T34	Ben Rowlings	United Kingdom	16.87	
12	1	T34	Roberto Michel	Mauritius	17.16	PB
13	1	T34	Abdullah Al-Enezi	Kuwait	17.23	
14	1	T34	Lee Leclerc	Canada	17.74	
15	2	T34	Khalid Hamad Al-Hajri	Qatar	18.82	
16	2	T34	Ahmed Nawad	United Arab Emirates	22.24	

=== Final ===
The final was started on 10 November at 20:19.

Rank	Lane	Sport Class	Name	Nationality	Time	Notes
1st place, gold medalist(s)	4	T34	Walid Ktila	Tunisia	14.99	
2nd place, silver medalist(s)	5	T34	Rheed McCracken	Australia	15.51	
3rd place, bronze medalist(s)	7	T34	Mohamed Alhammadi	United Arab Emirates	15.93	
4	8	T34	Chaiwat Rattana	Thailand	15.96	
5	6	T34	Austin Smeenk	Canada	16.09	
6	2	T34	Henry Manni	Finland	16.26	
7	9	T34	Mohammed Rashid Al-Kubaisi	Qatar	16.30	
8	3	T34	Bojan Mitic	Switzerland	16.63	

== T35 ==
=== Records ===
World record	Ihor Tsvietov (UKR)	12.22	Rio de Janeiro, Brazil	9 September 2016
Championship record	Ihor Tsvietov (UKR)	12.38	London, Great Britain	23 July 2017

=== Schedule ===
The event schedule, in local time (UTC+4), was as follows:

Date	Time	Round
14 November	10:09	Round 1
15 November	18:42	Final

=== Round 1 ===
First 3 in each heat (Q) and the next 2 fastest (q) advance to the final.

Rank	Heat	Sport Class	Name	Nationality	Time	Notes
1	1	T35	Ihor Tsvietov	Ukraine	12.19	Q, WR
2	1	T35	Dmitrii Safronov	Russia	12.54	Q
3	1	T35	Fábio Bordignon	Brazil	12.69	Q
4	1	T35	Hernan Barreto	Argentina	12.73	q, PB
5	2	T35	Artem Kalashian	Russia	12.77	Q
6	2	T35	Jordan Howe	United Kingdom	12.94	Q
7	2	T35	Marshall Zackery	United States	13.14	Q
8	2	T35	Idrees Al-Zaidi	Iraq	13.52	q, PB
9	2	T35	Jacob Phillips	New Zealand	13.56	AR
10	1	T35	Bao Chui Yiu	Hong Kong	14.52	PB

=== Final ===
The final was started on 15 November at 18:42.

Rank	Lane	Sport Class	Name	Nationality	Time	Notes
1st place, gold medalist(s)	6	T35	Ihor Tsvietov	Ukraine	11.77	WR
2nd place, silver medalist(s)	5	T35	Artem Kalashian	Russia	11.93	PB
3rd place, bronze medalist(s)	7	T35	Dmitrii Safronov	Russia	12.03	SB
4	8	T35	Fábio Bordignon	Brazil	12.64	
5	3	T35	Hernan Barreto	Argentina	12.71	PB
6	4	T35	Jordan Howe	United Kingdom	12.86	
7	9	T35	Marshall Zackery	United States	12.99	
8	2	T35	Idrees Al-Zaidi	Iraq	13.54	

== T36 ==
=== Records ===
World record	Mohamad Ridzuan Mohamad Puzi (MAS)	11.87	Jakarta, Indonesia	9 October 2018
Championship record	Evgenii Shvetsov (RUS)	11.90	Lyon, France	22 July 2013

=== Schedule ===
The event schedule, in local time (UTC+4), was as follows:

Date	Time	Round
10 November	9:33	Round 1
10 November	19:23	Final

=== Round 1 ===
First 3 in each heat (Q) and the next 2 fastest (q) advance to the final.

Rank	Heat	Sport Class	Name	Nationality	Time	Notes
1	2	T36	Yang Yifei	China	11.91	Q, =PB
2	2	T36	Alexis Sebastian Chavez	Argentina	11.95	Q, AR
3	1	T36	Mohamad Ridzuan Mohamad Puzi	Malaysia	11.98	Q
4	1	T36	James Turner	Australia	12.03	Q, AR
5	2	T36	Evgenii Shvetsov	Russia	12.12	Q
6	1	T36	Evgenii Torsunov	Russia	12.16	Q, SB
7	1	T36	Farhad Kahrizi	Iran	12.22	q, PB
8	2	T36	Taha Al Harrasi	Oman	12.35	q, PB
9	2	T36	Juan Moreno Márquez	Colombia	12.38	PB
10	1	T36	Krzysztof Ciuksza	Poland	12.51	PB
11	2	T36	William Stedman	New Zealand	12.51	PB
12	2	T36	Oleksandr Lytvynenko	Ukraine	12.56	PB
13	2	T36	Muhamad Agung Laksana	Indonesia	12.59	
14	1	T36	Roman Pavlyk	Ukraine	12.61	
15	1	T36	Rodrigo Parreira da Silva	Brazil	12.80	
16	1	T36	Enrique Ornano	Panama	14.20	

=== Final ===
The final was started on 10 November at 19:23.

Rank	Lane	Sport Class	Name	Nationality	Time	Notes
1st place, gold medalist(s)	4	T36	James Turner	Australia	11.72	WR
2nd place, silver medalist(s)	5	T36	Yang Yifei	China	11.79	AR
3rd place, bronze medalist(s)	7	T36	Mohamad Ridzuan Mohamad Puzi	Malaysia	11.97	
4	6	T36	Alexis Sebastian Chavez	Argentina	12.04	
5	8	T36	Evgenii Shvetsov	Russia	12.19	
6	9	T36	Evgenii Torsunov	Russia	12.26	
7	2	T36	Farhad Kahrizi	Iran	12.35	
8	3	T36	Taha Al Harrasi	Oman	12.43	

== T37 ==
=== Records ===
World record	Charl du Toit (RSA)	11.42	Rio de Janeiro, Brazil	10 September 2016
Championship record	Andrei Vdovin (RUS)	11.46	Doha, Qatar	31 October 2015

=== Schedule ===
The event schedule, in local time (UTC+4), was as follows:

Date	Time	Round
11 November	10:24	Round 1
11 November	18:53	Final

=== Round 1 ===
First 3 in each heat (Q) and the next 2 fastest (q) advance to the final.

Rank	Heat	Sport Class	Name	Nationality	Time	Notes
1	2	T37	Andrei Vdovin	Russia	11.44	Q, CR
2	2	T37	Saptoyoga Purnomo	Indonesia	11.46	Q, AR
3	1	T37	Chermen Kobesov	Russia	11.55	Q
4	2	T37	Christian Gabriel Luiz da Costa	Brazil	11.59	Q
5	1	T37	Ali Alnakhli	Saudi Arabia	11.67	Q, PB
6	2	T37	Mostafa Fathalla Mohamed	Egypt	11.70	q
7	1	T37	Davoudali Ghasemi	Iran	11.73	Q, PB
8	1	T37	Mateus Evangelista Cardoso	Brazil	11.74	q
9	1	T37	Vladyslav Zahrebelnyi	Ukraine	11.76	
10	2	T37	Yaroslav Okapinskyi	Ukraine	12.21	PB
11	1	T37	Mirjalol Kurbanov	Uzbekistan	12.39	PB
12	2	T37	Samson Opiyo	Kenya	12.39	PB
13	1	T37	Noa Bak-Pedersen	Denmark	13.08	
	1	T37	Michał Kotkowski	Poland	DQ	
	2	T37	Brian Impellizzeri	Argentina	DNS	

=== Final ===
The final was started on 11 November at 18:53.

Rank	Lane	Sport Class	Name	Nationality	Time	Notes
1st place, gold medalist(s)	4	T37	Andrei Vdovin	Russia	11.18	
2nd place, silver medalist(s)	6	T37	Chermen Kobesov	Russia	11.32	
3rd place, bronze medalist(s)	5	T37	Saptoyoga Purnomo	Indonesia	11.41	
4	9	T37	Christian Gabriel Luiz da Costa	Brazil	11.45	
5	7	T37	Ali Alnakhli	Saudi Arabia	11.53	
6	3	T37	Mostafa Fathalla Mohamed	Egypt	11.62	
7	8	T37	Davoudali Ghasemi	Iran	11.74	
8	2	T37	Mateus Evangelista Cardoso	Brazil	11.80	

== T38 ==
=== Records ===
World record	Hu Jianwen (CHN)	10.74	Rio de Janeiro, Brazil	13 September 2016
Championship record	Evan O'Hanlon (AUS)	10.93	Lyon, France	22 July 2013

=== Schedule ===
The event schedule, in local time (UTC+4), was as follows:

Date	Time	Round
11 November	10:40	Round 1
11 November	19:21	Final

=== Round 1 ===
First 2 in each heat (Q) and the next 2 fastest (q) advance to the final.

Rank	Heat	Sport Class	Name	Nationality	Time	Notes
1	2	T38	Thomas Young	United Kingdom	11.12	Q, AR
2	2	T38	Zhu Dening	China	11.20	Q, PB
3	3	T38	Edson Cavalcante Pinheiro	Brazil	11.23	Q
4	1	T38	Dimitri Jozwicki	France	11.32	Q
5	1	T38	Evan O'Hanlon	Australia	11.38	Q
6	3	T38	Dixon de Jesús Hooker Velásquez	Colombia	11.44	Q, PB
7	3	T38	Khetag Khinchagov	Russia	11.45	q, PB
8	3	T38	Zhong Huanghao	China	11.68	q
9	2	T38	Rouvaun Wallace	South Africa	11.68	PB
10	2	T38	Sam Walker	Australia	11.69	PB
11	1	T38	Union Sekailwe	South Africa	11.92	
12	3	T38	Ari Gesini	Australia	12.05	PB
13	1	T38	Lorenzo Albaladejo Martínez	Spain	12.11	
14	1	T38	Davit Kavtaradze	Georgia	12.11	
15	2	T38	Nathayod Chaikhan	Thailand	12.22	
16	2	T38	Enes Şahin	Turkey	12.38	PB
17	3	T38	Kullakorn Butthajee	Thailand	13.08	
18	1	T38	José Rodolfo Chessani García	Mexico	18.71	
19	3	T38	Mykyta Senyk	Ukraine	47.14	

=== Final ===
The final was started on 11 November at 19.21.

Rank	Lane	Sport Class	Name	Nationality	Time	Notes
1st place, gold medalist(s)	7	T38	Zhu Dening	China	11.00	PB
2nd place, silver medalist(s)	6	T38	Thomas Young	United Kingdom	11.00	AR
3rd place, bronze medalist(s)	9	T38	Evan O'Hanlon	Australia	11.05	SB
4	5	T38	Edson Cavalcante Pinheiro	Brazil	11.23	
5	2	T38	Khetag Khinchagov	Russia	11.38	PB
6	4	T38	Dimitri Jozwicki	France	11.45	PB
7	8	T38	Dixon de Jesús Hooker Velásquez	Colombia	11.51	
8	3	T38	Zhong Huanghao	China	11.66	

== T47 ==
=== Records ===
World record	Petrúcio Ferreira (BRA)	10.50	Paris, France	15 June 2018
Championship record	Petrúcio Ferreira (BRA)	10.53	London, Great Britain	15 July 2017

=== Schedule ===
The event schedule, in local time (UTC+4), was as follows:

Date	Time	Round
10 November	20:35	Round 1
12 November	9:57	Semifinals
12 November	20:13	Final

=== Round 1 ===
First 3 in each heat (Q) and the next 4 fastest (q) advance to the semifinal.

Rank	Heat	Sport Class	Name	Nationality	Time	Notes
1	1	T47	Washington Junior	Brazil	10.76	Q, PB
2	2	T47	Petrúcio Ferreira	Brazil	10.78	Q
3	4	T46	Yohansson Nascimento	Brazil	10.92	Q
4	3	T47	Michał Derus	Poland	10.94	Q
5	4	T46	Danas Sodaitis	Lithuania	11.08	Q, PB
6	3	T46	Ifeanyichukwu Madubuike	Nigeria	11.09	Q
7	1	T46	Wang Hao	China	11.10	Q
8	1	T47	Phil Grolla	Germany	11.11	Q, PB
9	4	T47	Ola Abidogun	United Kingdom	11.12	Q
10	3	T47	Jack Briggs	United States	11.20	Q
11	2	T47	Nikita Kotukov	Russia	11.24	Q, =PB
12	2	T46	Tanner Wright	United States	11.26	Q
13	2	T47	Nur Ferry Pradana	Indonesia	11.26	q
14	3	T46	Kakeru Ishida	Japan	11.29	q
15	2	T47	Yudai Suzuki	Japan	11.47	q
16	1	T47	Rizal Bagus Saktyono	Indonesia	11.49	q
17	4	T46	Bradley Murere	Namibia	11.52	PB
18	2	T47	Bouba Ibrahim Bouba	Cameroon	11.56	
19	4	T47	Kenta Shinato	Japan	11.57	
20	1	T46	Kasper Filsø	Denmark	11.63	
21	3	T46	Steven Abraham	Papua New Guinea	11.75	
22	1	T47	Alexander Pototschnig	Austria	11.99	
	4	T46	Roderick Townsend-Roberts	United States	DQ	
	3	T47	Elyas Alyasi	Bahrain	DNS	

=== Semifinals ===
First 3 in each heat (Q) and the next 2 fastest (q) advance to the final.

Rank	Heat	Sport Class	Name	Nationality	Time	Notes
1	2	T47	Petrúcio Ferreira	Brazil	10.42	Q, WR
2	2	T46	Yohansson Nascimento	Brazil	10.72	Q, PB
3	1	T47	Washington Junior	Brazil	10.84	Q
4	2	T46	Wang Hao	China	10.89	Q
5	2	T47	Ola Abidogun	United Kingdom	10.92	q, PB
6	1	T47	Michał Derus	Poland	11.11	Q
7	2	T46	Ifeanyichukwu Madubuike	Nigeria	11.12	q
8	2	T47	Jack Briggs	United States	11.21	
9	2	T46	Kakeru Ishida	Japan	11.25	
10	1	T47	Phil Grolla	Germany	11.26	Q
11	1	T46	Danas Sodaitis	Lithuania	11.29	
12	1	T47	Nur Ferry Pradana	Indonesia	11.30	
13	2	T47	Rizal Bagus Saktyono	Indonesia	11.37	SB
14	1	T47	Nikita Kotukov	Russia	11.46	
15	1	T46	Tanner Wright	United States	11.51	
16	1	T47	Yudai Suzuki	Japan	12.79	

=== Final ===
The final was started on 12 November at 20:13.

Rank	Lane	Sport Class	Name	Nationality	Time	Notes
1st place, gold medalist(s)	4	T47	Petrúcio Ferreira	Brazil	10.44	
2nd place, silver medalist(s)	5	T47	Washington Junior	Brazil	10.58	PB
3rd place, bronze medalist(s)	7	T46	Yohansson Nascimento	Brazil	10.69	PB
4	6	T47	Michał Derus	Poland	10.83	SB
5	8	T46	Wang Hao	China	10.87	
6	3	T47	Ola Abidogun	United Kingdom	10.98	
7	2	T46	Ifeanyichukwu Madubuike	Nigeria	11.10	
8	9	T47	Phil Grolla	Germany	11.16	

== T51 ==
=== Records ===
World record	Peter Genyn (BEL)	19.89	Nottwil, Switzerland	31 May 2018
Championship record	Peter Genyn (BEL)	20.93	Doha, Qatar	27 October 2015

=== Schedule ===
The event schedule, in local time (UTC+4), was as follows:

Date	Time	Round
7 November	22:00	Final

=== Final ===
The final was started on 7 November at 22:00.

Rank	Lane	Sport Class	Name	Nationality	Time	Notes
1st place, gold medalist(s)	4	T51	Toni Piispanen	Finland	20.33	CR
2nd place, silver medalist(s)	5	T51	Peter Genyn	Belgium	20.50	
3rd place, bronze medalist(s)	6	T51	Edgar Navarro	Mexico	22.48	
4	7	T51	Roger Habsch	Belgium	22.69	
5	3	T51	Hélder Mestre	Portugal	24.15	
6	9	T51	João Correia	Portugal	24.57	
	8	T51	Mohamed Berrahal	Algeria	DQ	

== T52 ==
=== Records ===
World record	Raymond Martin (USA)	16.41	Arbon, Switzerland	30 May 2019
Championship record	Raymond Martin (USA)	16.83	London, Great Britain	22 July 2017

=== Schedule ===
The event schedule, in local time (UTC+4), was as follows:

Date	Time	Round
11 November	21:10	Round 1
12 November	20:37	Final

=== Round 1 ===
First 3 in each heat (Q) and the next 2 fastest (q) advance to the final.

Rank	Heat	Sport Class	Name	Nationality	Time	Notes
1	1	T52	Gianfranco Iannotta	United States	16.92	Q, SB
2	2	T52	Raymond Martin	United States	17.06	Q
3	2	T52	Tomoya Ito	Japan	17.35	Q, AR
4	1	T52	Yuki Oya	Japan	17.49	Q, AR
5	2	T52	Salvador Hernández	Mexico	17.67	Q
6	2	T52	Beat Bösch	Switzerland	17.70	q
7	1	T52	Sam McIntosh	Australia	17.76	Q
8	1	T52	Leonardo de Jesús Pérez Juárez	Mexico	17.87	q
9	1	T52	Isaiah Rigo	United States	18.06	
10	1	T52	Fabian Blum	Switzerland	18.31	
11	2	T52	Jeong Jong-dae	South Korea	18.55	
12	2	T52	Brandon Beack	South Africa	19.23	
13	2	T52	Mário Trindade	Portugal	19.53	
14	1	T52	Peth Rungsri	Thailand	20.40	

=== Final ===
The final was started on 12 November at 20:37.

Rank	Lane	Sport Class	Name	Nationality	Time	Notes
1st place, gold medalist(s)	4	T52	Raymond Martin	United States	16.88	
2nd place, silver medalist(s)	6	T52	Gianfranco Iannotta	United States	16.96	
3rd place, bronze medalist(s)	7	T52	Tomoya Ito	Japan	17.41	
4	5	T52	Yuki Oya	Japan	17.52	
5	9	T52	Salvador Hernández	Mexico	17.61	
6	8	T52	Sam McIntosh	Australia	17.69	=SB
7	3	T52	Leonardo de Jesús Pérez Juárez	Mexico	17.77	PB
8	2	T52	Beat Bösch	Switzerland	17.95	

== T53 ==
=== Records ===
World record	Brent Lakatos (CAN)	14.10	Arbon, Switzerland	27 May 2017
Championship record	Brent Lakatos (CAN)	14.38	Doha, Qatar	22 October 2015

=== Schedule ===
The event schedule, in local time (UTC+4), was as follows:

Date	Time	Round
7 November	20:09	Round 1
8 November	20:02	Final

=== Round 1 ===
First 3 in each heat (Q) and the next 2 fastest (q) advance to the final.

Rank	Heat	Sport Class	Name	Nationality	Time	Notes
1	2	T53	Brent Lakatos	Canada	14.50	Q, SB
2	1	T53	Pongsakorn Paeyo	Thailand	14.52	Q
3	1	T53	Abdulrahman Al-Qurashi	Saudi Arabia	14.89	Q, PB
4	2	T53	Pierre Fairbank	France	14.95	Q, SB
5	2	T53	Fahad Al-Ganaidl	Saudi Arabia	14.96	Q
6	1	T53	Brian Siemann	United States	15.24	Q, SB
7	2	T53	Yoo Byung-hoon	South Korea	15.38	q, PB
8	1	T53	Ariosvaldo Fernandes da Silva	Brazil	15.42	q
9	1	T53	Yang Shaoqiao	China	15.44	
10	2	T53	Mickey Bushell	United Kingdom	15.47	
11	1	T53	Pichet Krungget	Thailand	15.48	
12	1	T53	Nicolas Brignone	France	15.60	
13	2	T53	Sopa Intasen	Thailand	15.87	SB
14	2	T53	Enkhmanlai Purevtsog	Mongolia	16.05	PB
15	1	T53	Maclean Dzidzienyo	Ghana	16.25	SB
16	2	T53	Abdullah Alenzei	Kuwait	16.77	

=== Final ===
The final was started on 8 November at 20:02.

Rank	Lane	Sport Class	Name	Nationality	Time	Notes
1st place, gold medalist(s)	5	T53	Brent Lakatos	Canada	14.59	
2nd place, silver medalist(s)	7	T53	Abdulrahman Al-Qurashi	Saudi Arabia	14.93	
3rd place, bronze medalist(s)	6	T53	Pongsakorn Paeyo	Thailand	14.97	
4	4	T53	Pierre Fairbank	France	15.00	
5	2	T53	Ariosvaldo Fernandes da Silva	Brazil	15.24	
6	8	T53	Brian Siemann	United States	15.28	
7	3	T53	Yoo Byung-hoon	South Korea	15.30	PB
8	9	T53	Fahad Al-Ganaidl	Saudi Arabia	15.31	

== T54 ==
=== Records ===
World record	Leo-Pekka Tähti (FIN)	13.63	London, Great Britain	1 September 2012
Championship record	Leo-Pekka Tähti (FIN)	13.76	Lyon, France	25 July 2013

=== Schedule ===
The event schedule, in local time (UTC+4), was as follows:

Date	Time	Round
7 November	10:48	Round 1
7 November	19:09	Semifinals
8 November	18:09	Final

=== Round 1 ===
First 3 in each heat (Q) and the next 4 fastest (q) advance to the semifinal.

Rank	Heat	Sport Class	Name	Nationality	Time	Notes
1	1	T54	Samuel Carter	Australia	13.94	Q
2	4	T54	Juan Pablo Cervantes García	Mexico	14.02	Q, AR
3	2	T54	Leo-Pekka Tähti	Finland	14.07	Q
4	3	T54	Liu Yang	China	14.14	Q
5	1	T54	Zhang Ying	China	14.20	Q, PB
6	1	T54	Erik Hightower	United States	14.30	Q, SB
7	3	T54	Tomoki Ikoma	Japan	14.37	Q
8	4	T54	Kenny van Weeghel	Netherlands	14.39	Q
9	2	T54	Luke Bailey	Australia	14.44	Q
10	4	T54	Hu Yang	China	14.55	Q
11	3	T54	Alexey Bychenok	Russia	14.55	Q
12	3	T54	Vun Van	Cambodia	14.57	q, PB
13	4	T54	Jamaan Al-Zahrani	Saudi Arabia	14.73	q
14	1	T54	Nathan Maguire	United Kingdom	14.83	q
15	2	T54	Saichon Konjen	Thailand	14.84	Q
16	1	T54	Nkegbe Botsyo	Ghana	14.89	q
17	2	T54	Richard Chiassaro	United Kingdom	14.91	
18	3	T54	Jaenal Aripin	Indonesia	14.97	
19	3	T54	Leonardo de Melo	Brazil	15.05	
20	2	T54	Arsen Kurbanov	Russia	15.10	
21	4	T54	Yuki Nishi	Japan	15.18	
22	4	T54	Mark Braun	United States	15.26	
23	1	T54	Ekkachai Janthon	Thailand	15.26	
24	2	T54	José Manuel Quintero Macías	Spain	15.97	
25	3	T54	Smbat Karapetyan	Armenia	18.97	
26	4	T54	Roodly Gowaseb	Namibia	19.32	
27	1	T54	Stas Nazaryan	Armenia	19.88	
	2	T54	Demba Jarju	Gambia	DNS	

=== Semifinals ===
First 3 in each heat (Q) and the next 2 fastest (q) advance to the final.

Rank	Heat	Sport Class	Name	Nationality	Time	Notes
1	1	T54	Leo-Pekka Tähti	Finland	13.83	Q, SB
2	2	T54	Samuel Carter	Australia	13.98	Q
3	2	T54	Liu Yang	China	13.98	Q, SB
4	1	T54	Juan Pablo Cervantes García	Mexico	14.04	Q
5	2	T54	Zhang Ying	China	14.23	Q
6	2	T54	Erik Hightower	United States	14.27	q, SB
7	2	T54	Kenny van Weeghel	Netherlands	14.27	q
8	1	T54	Luke Bailey	Australia	14.44	Q
9	2	T54	Saichon Konjen	Thailand	14.51	SB
10	1	T54	Tomoki Ikoma	Japan	14.54	
11	1	T54	Alexey Bychenok	Russia	14.56	
12	1	T54	Hu Yang	China	14.57	
12	2	T54	Vun Van	Cambodia	14.57	
14	1	T54	Jamaan Al-Zahrani	Saudi Arabia	14.66	
15	1	T54	Nathan Maguire	United Kingdom	14.73	
16	2	T54	Nkegbe Botsyo	Ghana	14.91	

=== Final ===
The final was started on 8 November at 18:09.

Rank	Lane	Sport Class	Name	Nationality	Time	Notes
1st place, gold medalist(s)	5	T54	Leo-Pekka Tähti	Finland	13.97	
2nd place, silver medalist(s)	6	T54	Liu Yang	China	14.02	
3rd place, bronze medalist(s)	7	T54	Juan Pablo Cervantes García	Mexico	14.10	
4	4	T54	Samuel Carter	Australia	14.12	
5	8	T54	Zhang Ying	China	14.31	
6	3	T54	Erik Hightower	United States	14.33	
7	9	T54	Luke Bailey	Australia	14.55	
8	2	T54	Kenny van Weeghel	Netherlands	14.62	

== T63 ==
=== Records ===
World record	Vinícius Gonçalves Rodrigues (BRA)	11.95	São Paulo, Brazil	25 April 2019
Championship record	Scott Reardon (AUS)	12.13	Doha, Qatar	25 October 2015

=== Schedule ===
The event schedule, in local time (UTC+4), was as follows:

Date	Time	Round
13 November	20:32	Round 1
15 November	18:53	Final

=== Round 1 ===
First 3 in each heat (Q) and the next 2 fastest (q) advance to the final.

Rank	Heat	Sport Class	Name	Nationality	Time	Notes
1	1	T63	Vinícius Gonçalves Rodrigues	Brazil	12.25	Q
2	1	T63	Desmond Jackson	United States	12.36	Q, PB
3	1	T63	Daniel Wagner	Denmark	12.45	Q, SB
4	2	T63	Léon Schäfer	Germany	12.56	Q
5	2	T42	Anton Prokhorov	Russia	12.74	Q, AR
6	1	T63	Kantinan Khumphong	Thailand	12.98	q, SB
7	2	T42	Clavel Kayitaré	France	13.17	Q
8	2	T63	Ezra Frech	United States	13.50	q, PB
9	1	T42	Mulyono	Indonesia	14.21	
19	2	T63	Nurullah Kart	Turkey	14.54	PB

=== Final ===
The final was started on 15 November at 18:53.

Rank	Lane	Sport Class	Name	Nationality	Time	Notes
1st place, gold medalist(s)	8	T63	Daniel Wagner	Denmark	12.32	SB
2nd place, silver medalist(s)	4	T63	Léon Schäfer	Germany	12.34	
3rd place, bronze medalist(s)	6	T63	Vinícius Gonçalves Rodrigues	Brazil	12.38	
4	7	T42	Anton Prokhorov	Russia	12.42	WR
5	5	T63	Desmond Jackson	United States	12.43	
6	9	T42	Clavel Kayitaré	France	13.15	
7	3	T63	Kantinan Khumphong	Thailand	13.21	
8	2	T63	Ezra Frech	United States	13.67	

== T64 ==
=== Records ===
T44	World record	Mpumelelo Mhlongo (RSA)	11.12	Paris, France	29 August 2019
T62	World record	Johannes Floors (GER)	10.66	Leverkusen, Germany	21 June 2019
T64	World record	Richard Browne (USA)	10.61	Doha, Qatar	29 October 2015
T64	Championship record	Richard Browne (USA)	10.61	Doha, Qatar	29 October 2015

=== Schedule ===
The event schedule, in local time (UTC+4), was as follows:

Date	Time	Round
10 November	10:04	Round 1
11 November	19:43	Final

=== Round 1 ===
First 2 in each heat (Q) and the next 2 fastest (q) advance to the final.

Rank	Heat	Sport Class	Name	Nationality	Time	Notes
1	3	T62	Johannes Floors	Germany	10.54	Q, WR
2	1	T64	Felix Streng	Germany	10.99	Q, SB
3	2	T44	Mpumelelo Mhlongo	South Africa	11.09	Q, WR
4	1	T64	Michail Seitis	Greece	11.22	Q
4	3	T64	Kevan Hueftle	United States	11.24	Q, PB
6	1	T62	Nick Rogers	United States	11.51	q, =AR
7	3	T64	Shunsuke Itani	Japan	11.61	q
8	1	T62	Daniel du Plessis	South Africa	11.63	PB
9	2	T64	Simone Manigrasso	Italy	11.51	Q
10	3	T64	Denpoom Kotcharang	Thailand	11.72	PB
11	3	T64	Alberto Ávila Chamorro	Spain	11.85	PB
12	1	T64	Arz Zahreddine	Lebanon	12.05	PB
13	1	T64	Alex Lee	Ireland	12.10	
14	2	T44	Indika Gamage	Sri Lanka	12.12	
15	3	T64	Mitchell Joynt	New Zealand	12.40	AR
16	1	T44	Upul Abarana	Sri Lanka	12.66	PB
17	3	T44	Amila Warnakulasooriya	Sri Lanka	12.81	
18	2	T44	Nour Al-Sana	Saudi Arabia	13.36	
	2	T62	David Behre	Germany	DNS	
	2	T64	Richard Browne	United States	DNS	

=== Final ===
The final was started on 11 November at 18:43.

Rank	Lane	Sport Class	Name	Nationality	Time	Notes
1st place, gold medalist(s)	4	T62	Johannes Floors	Germany	10.60	
2nd place, silver medalist(s)	7	T44	Mpumelelo Mhlongo	South Africa	11.00	WR
3rd place, bronze medalist(s)	6	T64	Felix Streng	Germany	11.00	
4	9	T64	Kevan Hueftle	United States	11.22	PB
5	5	T64	Michail Seitis	Greece	11.23	
6	8	T64	Simone Manigrasso	Italy	11.37	PB
7	2	T62	Nick Rogers	United States	11.42	AR
8	3	T64	Shunsuke Itani	Japan	11.63	

== RR3 ==
=== Schedule ===
The event schedule, in local time (UTC+4), was as follows:

Date	Time	Round
15 November	18:20	Final

=== Final ===
The final was started on 15 November at 18:20.

Rank	Lane	Sport Class	Name	Nationality	Time	Notes
1st place, gold medalist(s)	4	RR3	Gavin Drysdale	United Kingdom	16.72	PB
2nd place, silver medalist(s)	6	RR3	Rafi Solaiman	United Kingdom	17.38	
3rd place, bronze medalist(s)	7	RR3	Adriano Ferreira de Souza	Brazil	18.25	
4	5	RR2	Odd Markus Lütken	Norway	19.92	
5	3	RR2	Lasse Kromann	Denmark	19.98	PB

== See also ==
- List of IPC world records in athletics
