= Athletics at the 2020 Summer Paralympics – Men's 100 metres T35 =

Men's 100 metres T35 at the XVI Paralympic Games
- Venue: Tokyo National Stadium
- Dates: 30 August 2021 (final)
- Competitors: 7 from 5 nations
- Winning time: 11.39

Medalists
| 1st place, gold medalist(s) | | Dmitrii Safronov | RPC |
| 2nd place, silver medalist(s) | | Ihor Tsvietov | Ukraine |
| 3rd place, bronze medalist(s) | | Artem Kalashian | RPC |

Men's 100 metres
T11 · T12 · T13 · T33 · T34 · T35 · T36 · T37 · T38 · T47 · T51 · T52 · T53 · T54 · T63 · T64

The men's 100 metres T35 event at the 2020 Summer Paralympics in Tokyo, took place on 30 August 2021.

The T35 category is for ambulant athletes with cerebral palsy. The typical T35 athlete may need assistive devices for walking. The athlete may have sufficient function to run but demonstrates poor balance.

== Records ==
Prior to the competition, the existing records were as follows:

| World Record | Ihor Tsvietov (UKR) | 11.77 | Dubai, United Arab Emirates | 15 November 2019 |
| Paralympic Record | Ihor Tsvietov (UKR) | 12.22 | Rio de Janeiro, Brazil | 9 September 2016 |

| Area | Time | Athlete | Nation |
|---|---|---|---|
| Africa | 12.96 | Teboho Mokgalagadi | South Africa |
| America | 12.57 | Fábio Bordignon | Brazil |
| Asia | 12.29 | Yang Sen | China |
| Europe | 11.77 WR | Ihor Tsvietov | Ukraine |
| Oceania | 13.56 | Jacob Phillips | New Zealand |

== Results ==
The final took place on 30 August 2021, at 19:04:

| Rank | Lane | Name | Nationality | Time | Notes |
|---|---|---|---|---|---|
| 1st place, gold medalist(s) | 4 | Dmitrii Safronov | RPC | 11.39 | WR |
| 2nd place, silver medalist(s) | 6 | Ihor Tsvietov | Ukraine | 11.47 | PB |
| 3rd place, bronze medalist(s) | 7 | Artem Kalashian | RPC | 11.75 | PB |
| 4 | 5 | David Dzhatiev | RPC | 11.82 | PB |
| 5 | 8 | Fábio Bordignon | Brazil | 12.54 | |
| 6 | 2 | Hernan Barreto | Argentina | 12.59 | PB |
| 7 | 3 | Marshall Zackery | United States | 13.08 | |
