= Athletics at the 2024 Summer Paralympics – Men's 100 metres T35 =

Men's 100 metres T35 at the XVII Paralympic Games
- Venue: Stade de France
- Dates: 2 September 2024
- Competitors: 9 from 5 nations
- Winning time: 11.43

Medalists
1st place, gold medalist(s)		Ihor Tsvietov	Ukraine
2nd place, silver medalist(s)		Artem Kalashian	Neutral Paralympic Athletes
3rd place, bronze medalist(s)		Dmitrii Safronov	Neutral Paralympic Athletes

100 metres at the 2024 Summer Paralympics
Men · T11 · T12 · T13 · T34 · T35 · T36 · T37 · T38 · T44 · T47 · T51 · T52 · T53 · T54 · T63 · T64
Women · T11 · T12 · T13 · T34 · T35 · T36 · T37 · T38 · T47 · T53 · T54 · T63 · T64

The men's 100 metres T35 event at the 2024 Summer Paralympics in Paris, took place on 2 September 2024.

The T35 category is for ambulant athletes with cerebral palsy. The typical T35 athlete may need assistive devices for walking. The athlete may have sufficient function to run but demonstrates poor balance.

== Records ==
Prior to the competition, the existing records were as follows:

World Record	Dmitrii Safronov (RPC)	11.39	(Japan) Tokyo	30 August 2021
Paralympic Record	Dmitrii Safronov (RPC)	11.39	(Japan) Tokyo	30 August 2021

Area	Time		Athlete	Location	Date
Africa	12.96		(South Africa) Teboho Mokgalagadi	(New Zealand) Christchurch	24 January 2011
America	12.08		(Brazil) Henrique Nascimento	(Brazil) São Paulo	8 June 2024
Asia	12.29		(China) Yang Sen	(China) Beijing	13 September 2008
Europe	11.39	WR	Dmitrii Safronov	(Japan) Tokyo	30 August 2021
Oceania	12.96		(Australia) Jackson Love	(Australia) Adelaide	13 April 2024

== Results ==
=== Final ===
Rank	Lane	Athlete	Nation	Time	Notes
1st place, gold medalist(s)	7	Ihor Tsvietov	Ukraine	11.43	PB
2nd place, silver medalist(s)	4	Artem Kalashian	Neutral Paralympic Athletes	11.70	PB
3rd place, bronze medalist(s)	5	Dmitrii Safronov	Neutral Paralympic Athletes	11.79	SB
4	3	Henrique Nascimento	Brazil	11.85	AR
5	6	David Dzhatiev	Neutral Paralympic Athletes	12.06	
6	9	Ivan Tetiukhin	Ukraine	12.07	PB
7	2	Maximiliano Villa	Argentina	12.21	SB
8	1	Fabio Bordignon	Brazil	12.41	
9	8	Hernan Barreto	Argentina	12.41	SB
Source:				Wind: +0.3 m/s	
