= Athletics at the 2016 Summer Paralympics – Men's 200 metres T35 =

Men's 200 metres T35 at the XV Paralympic Games
- Venue: Estádio Olímpico João Havelange
- Dates: 11–12 September 2016
- Competitors: 9 from 7 nations

Medalists
1st place, gold medalist(s)		Ihor Tsvietov	Ukraine
2nd place, silver medalist(s)		Fabio da Silva Bordignon	Brazil
3rd place, bronze medalist(s)		Hernan Barreto	Argentina

The T35 category is for ambulant athletes with cerebral palsy. The typical T35 athlete may need assistive devices for walking. The athlete may have sufficient function to run but demonstrates poor balance.

The Athletics at the 2016 Summer Paralympics – Men's 200 metres T35 event at the 2016 Paralympic Games took place on 11–12 September 2016, at the Estádio Olímpico João Havelange.

== Heats ==
=== Heat 1 ===
11:19 11 September 2016:

Rank	Lane	Bib	Name	Nationality	Reaction	Time	Notes
1	7	2330	Ihor Tsvietov	Ukraine		25.64	Q
2	5	1036	Diego Martin Gonzalez	Argentina		26.92	Q
3	4	2361	Ayden Jent	United States		28.81	Q
	6	1243	Xinhan Fu	China			DSQ

=== Heat 2 ===
11:26 11 September 2016:

Rank	Lane	Bib	Name	Nationality	Reaction	Time	Notes
1	6	1140	Fabio da Silva Bordignon	Brazil		26.22	Q
2	7	1034	Hernan Barreto	Argentina		27.37	Q
3	4	1508	Jordan Howe	Great Britain		27.61	Q
4	3	1032	Nicolas Martin Aravena	Argentina		28.71	q
5	5	1962	Jacob Phillips	New Zealand		28.78	q

== Final ==
10:50 12 September 2016:

Rank	Lane	Bib	Name	Nationality	Reaction	Time	Notes
1st place, gold medalist(s)	5	2330	Ihor Tsvietov	Ukraine		25.11	
2nd place, silver medalist(s)	3	1140	Fabio da Silva Bordignon	Brazil		26.01	
3rd place, bronze medalist(s)	4	1034	Hernan Barreto	Argentina		26.50	
4	6	1036	Diego Martin Gonzalez	Argentina		27.21	
5	8	2361	Ayden Jent	United States		27.45	
6	2	1032	Nicolas Martin Aravena	Argentina		27.51	
7	7	1508	Jordan Howe	Great Britain		27.62	
8	1	1962	Jacob Phillips	New Zealand		29.10	
