= 2019 World Para Athletics Championships – Men's 200 metres =

The men's 200 metres at the 2019 World Para Athletics Championships was held in Dubai 7–15 November.

== Medalists ==
Event	Gold		Silver		Bronze	
T35 details	Ihor Tsvietov; Ukraine	23.04 WR	Dmitrii Safronov; Russia	23.93 PB	Artem Kalashian; Russia	24.24 PB
T37 details	Andrey Vdovin; Russia	22.60 SB	Antonio de Jesus Vitor; Brazil	22.77 AR	Chermen Kobesov; Russia	22.88 PB
T51 details	Peter Genyn; Belgium	37.90 CR	Toni Piipanen; Finland	38.32	Mohamed Berrahal; Algeria	40.70 AR
T61 details	Ntando Mahlangu; South Africa	23.23	Richard Whitehead; United Kingdom	23.82 PB	Ali Lacin; Germany	24.63 PB
T64 details	Ronald Hertog; Netherlands	22.20	Michail Seitis; Greece	22.23	David Prince; United States	22.59
WR world record | AR area record | CR championship record | GR games record | NR national record | OR Olympic record | PB personal best | SB season best | WL world leading (in a given season)

Events listed in pink were contested but no medals were awarded.

== T35 ==
=== Records ===
World record	Dmitrii Safronov (RUS)	24.69	Lyon, France	27 July 2013
Championship record	Dmitrii Safronov (RUS)	24.69	Lyon, France	27 July 2013

=== Schedule ===
The event schedule, in local time (UTC+4), was as follows:

Date	Time	Round
9 November	18:52	Final

=== Final ===
The final was started on 9 November at 18:52.

Rank	Lane	Sport Class	Name	Nationality	Time	Notes
1st place, gold medalist(s)	5	T35	Ihor Tsvietov	Ukraine	23.04	WR
2nd place, silver medalist(s)	7	T35	Dmitrii Safronov	Russia	23.93	PB
3rd place, bronze medalist(s)	4	T35	Artem Kalashian	Russia	24.24	PB
4	8	T35	Fabio Bordignon	Brazil	26.15	SB
5	9	T35	Marshall Zackery	United States	26.57	PB
6	1	T35	Jacob Phillips	New Zealand	29.30	
7	2	T35	Bao Chui Yiu	Hong Kong	30.53	PB
8	6	T35	Hernan Barreto	Argentina	31.47	
	3	T35	Idrees Al-Zaidi	Iraq	DQ	R 17.8

== T37 ==
=== Records ===
World record	Andrey Vdovin (RUS)	22.59	Doha, Qatar	22 October 2015
Championship record	Andrey Vdovin (RUS)	22.59	Doha, Qatar	22 October 2015

=== Schedule ===
The event schedule, in local time (UTC+4), was as follows:

Date	Time	Round
12 November	18:25	Round 1
13 November	20:15	Final

=== Round 1 ===
The first round was started on 12 November at 18:25.

Rank	Heat	Lane	Sport Class	Name	Nationality	Time	Notes
1	3	7	T37	Vitor Antonio de Jesus	Brazil	23.01	Q
2	2	5	T37	Chermen Kobesov	Russia	23.04	Q
3	2	4	T37	Charl du Toit	South Africa	23.10	Q
4	1	4	T37	Christian Gabriel Luiz da Costa	Brazil	23.26	Q
5	1	7	T37	Andrey Vdovin	Russia	23.26	Q
6	3	5	T37	Ali Alnakhli	Saudi Arabia	23.46	Q
7	1	5	T37	Saptoyoga Purnomo	Indonesia	23.52	q
8	3	6	T37	Michał Kotkowski	Poland	23.55	q
9	2	7	T37	Mateus Evangelista Cardoso	Brazil	23.71	
10	3	4	T37	Davoudali Ghasemi	Iran	23.77	
11	2	6	T37	Sofiane Hamdi	Algeria	23.96	
12	2	8	T37	Yaroslav Okapinskyi	Ukraine	23.98	
13	1	3	T37	Mirjalol Kurbanov	Uzbekistan	24.97	
14	2	3	T37	Samson Opiyo	Kenya	25.19	
15	3	8	T37	Vladyslav Zahrebelnyi	Ukraine	25.43	
16	3	3	T37	Noa Bak-Pedersen	Denmark	26.56	
	1	6	T37	Mostafa Fathalla Mohamed	Egypt	DNS	

=== Final ===
The final was started on 13 November at 20:15.

Rank	Lane	Sport Class	Name	Nationality	Time	Notes
1st place, gold medalist(s)	9	T37	Andrey Vdovin	Russia	22.60	SB
2nd place, silver medalist(s)	7	T37	Vitor Antonio de Jesus	Brazil	22.77	AR
3rd place, bronze medalist(s)	6	T37	Chermen Kobesov	Russia	22.88	PB
4	4	T37	Charl du Toit	South Africa	23.03	PB
5	5	T37	Christian Gabriel Luiz da Costa	Brazil	23.10	PB
6	8	T37	Ali Alnakhli	Saudi Arabia	23.38	PB
7	2	T37	Saptoyoga Purnomo	Indonesia	23.53	PB
8	3	T37	Michał Kotkowski	Poland	23.54	PB

== T51 ==
=== Records ===
World record	Peter Genyn (BEL)	36.62	Nottwil, Switzerland	2 June 2017
Championship record	Edgar Cesareo Navarro Sanchez (MEX)	40.68	Lyon, France	26 July 2013

=== Schedule ===
The event schedule, in local time (UTC+4), was as follows:

Date	Time	Round
13 November	20:50	Final

=== Final ===
The final was started on 13 November at 20:50.

Rank	Lane	Sport Class	Name	Nationality	Time	Notes
1st place, gold medalist(s)	7	T51	Peter Genyn	Belgium	37.90	CR
2nd place, silver medalist(s)	4	T51	Toni Piispanen	Finland	38.32	
3rd place, bronze medalist(s)	8	T51	Mohamed Berrahal	Algeria	40.70	AR
4	5	T51	Edgar Cesareo Navarro Sanchez	Mexico	40.78	
5	3	T51	Roger Habsch	Belgium	42.06	
6	6	T51	Helder Mestre	Portugal	44.76	

== T61 ==
=== Records ===
World record	Ntando Mahlangu (RSA)	23.23	Nottwil, Switzerland	1 August 2019

=== Schedule ===
The event schedule, in local time (UTC+4), was as follows:

Date	Time	Round
14 November	18:58	Final

=== Final ===
The final was started on 14 November at 18:58.

Rank	Lane	Sport Class	Name	Nationality	Time	Notes
1st place, gold medalist(s)	5	T61	Ntando Mahlangu	South Africa	23.23	
2nd place, silver medalist(s)	4	T61	Richard Whitehead	United Kingdom	23.82	SB
3rd place, bronze medalist(s)	7	T61	Ali Lacin	Germany	24.63	PB
	6	T61	Luis Puertas	United States	DQ	R 18.5

== T64 ==
=== Records ===
T44	World record	Mpumelelo Mhlongo (RSA)	23.13	Stellenbosch, South Africa	1 August 2019
T64	World record	Richard Browne (USA)	21.27	Doha, Qatar	25 October 2015
T64	Championship record	Richard Browne (USA)	21.27	Doha, Qatar	25 October 2015

=== Schedule ===
The event schedule, in local time (UTC+4), was as follows:

Date	Time	Round
8 November	19:27	Round 1
9 November	19:09	Final

=== Round 1 ===
The first round was started on 8 November at 19:27.

Rank	Heat	Lane	Sport Class	Name	Nationality	Time	Notes
1	2	6	T64	Ronald Hertog	Netherlands	22.77	Q, PB
2	1	6	T64	Kevan Hueftle	United States	22.92	Q, PB
3	2	5	T64	Michail Seitis	Greece	23.07	Q
4	2	7	T64	Jerome Singleton	United States	23.30	Q, SB
5	1	4	T64	David Prince	United States	23.49	Q
6	2	4	T64	Shunsuke Itani	Japan	23.49	q, AR
7	1	7	T64	Simone Manigrasso	Italy	23.55	Q, SB
8	2	3	T64	Mitchell Joynt	New Zealand	23.65	q, AR
9	1	5	T64	Alberto Avila Chamorro	Spain	23.81	PB
10	2	8	T44	Karim Ramadan	Egypt	23.99	PB
11	2	9	T64	Arz Zahreddine	Lebanon	24.74	
12	1	3	T64	Alex Lee	Ireland	25.22	
13	2	2	T44	Denzel Namene	Namibia	25.60	
	1	9	T44	Nour Alsana	Saudi Arabia	DNF	
	1	8	T44	Vinay Kumar Lal	India	DQ	R 18.5

=== Final ===
The final was started on 9 November at 19:09.

Rank	Lane	Sport Class	Name	Nationality	Time	Notes
1st place, gold medalist(s)	7	T64	Ronald Hertog	Netherlands	22.20	
2nd place, silver medalist(s)	5	T64	Michail Seitis	Greece	22.23	
3rd place, bronze medalist(s)	6	T64	David Prince	United States	22.59	
4	4	T64	Kevan Hueftle	United States	22.62	
5	9	T64	Simone Manigrasso	Italy	22.87	
6	8	T64	Jerome Singleton	United States	23.09	
7	3	T64	Shunsuke Itani	Japan	23.38	
8	2	T64	Mitchell Joynt	New Zealand	23.64	

== See also ==
- List of IPC world records in athletics
