= 2021 World Para Athletics European Championships – Men's 200 metres =

The men's 200 metres events were held at the 2021 World Para Athletics European Championships in Bydgoszcz, Poland.

== Medalists ==
Event	Gold		Silver		Bronze	
T35	Ihor Tsvietov (UKR)	23.14 CR	Dmitrii Safronov (RUS)	23.16 PB	Artem Kalashian (RUS)	23.77 PB
T37	Andrei Vdovin (RUS)	23.14 CR	Michał Kotkowski (POL)	23.31 PB	Chermen Kobesov (RUS)	23.65
T51	Peter Genyn (BEL)	39.01 CR	Toni Piispanen (FIN)	39.57	Helder Mestre (POR)	46.45 SB
T64	Levi Vloet (NED)	23.47 PB	Alberto Avila Chamorro (ESP)	23.73 PB	Michail Seitis (GRE)	23.98

== See also ==
- List of IPC world records in athletics
