= Ihor Tsvietov =

Ukrainian Paralympic athlete (born 1994)

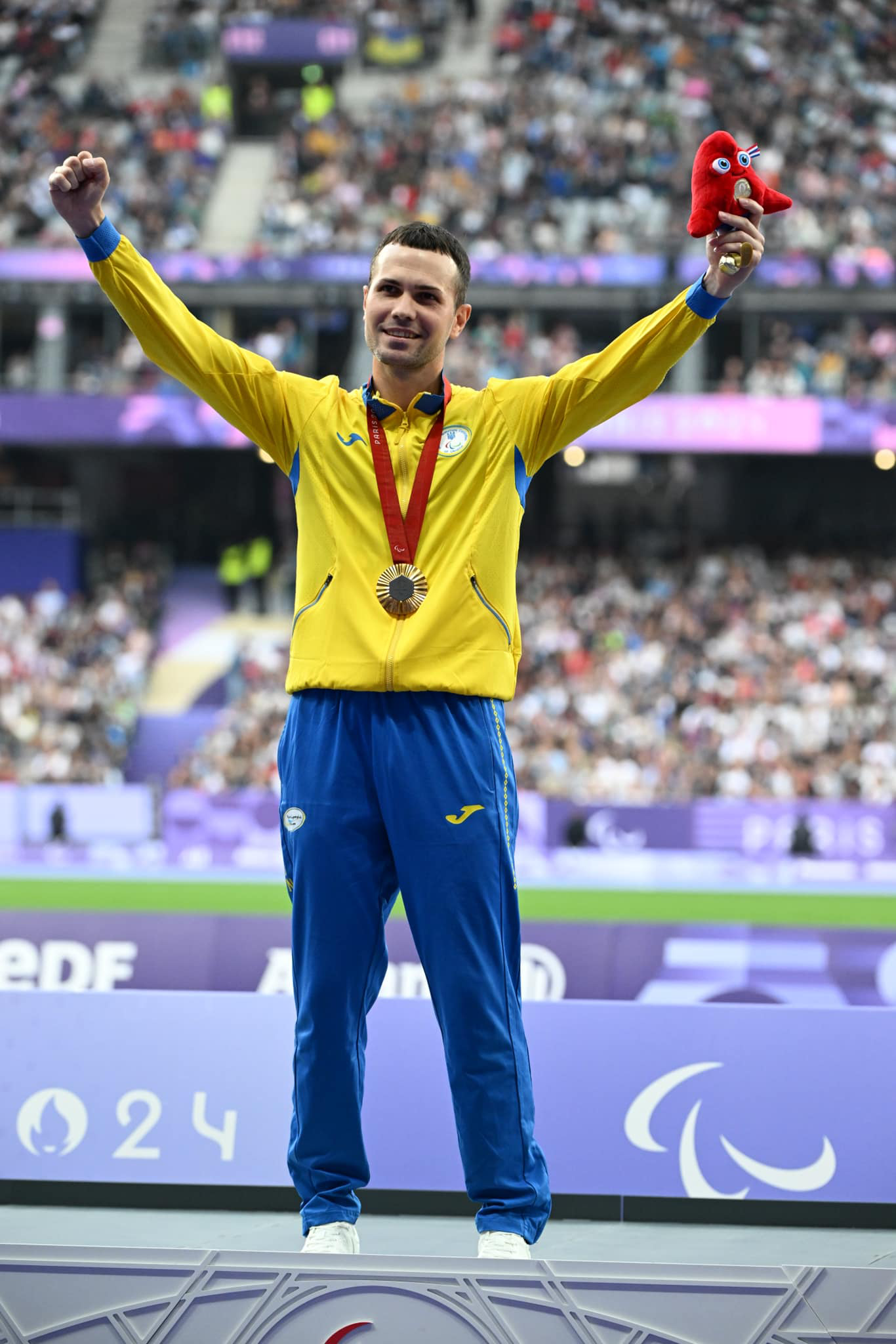
- Tsvietov at the 2024 Summer Paralympics

Personal information
- Born: 2 March 1994 (age 32) Mykolaiv, Ukraine

Sport
- Country: Ukraine
- Sport: Para-athletics
- Disability: Cerebral palsy
- Disability class: T35
- Events: 100 metres; 200 metres
Medal record
Men's para-athletics
Representing Ukraine
Paralympic Games
| Gold medal – first place | 2016 Rio de Janeiro | 100 m T35 |
| Gold medal – first place | 2016 Rio de Janeiro | 200 m T35 |
| Gold medal – first place | 2024 Paris | 100 m T35 |
| Gold medal – first place | 2024 Paris | 200 m T35 |
| Silver medal – second place | 2020 Tokyo | 100 m T35 |
| Silver medal – second place | 2020 Tokyo | 200 m T35 |
World Championships
| Gold medal – first place | 2017 London | 100 m T35 |
| Gold medal – first place | 2017 London | 200 m T35 |
| Gold medal – first place | 2019 Dubai | 100 m T35 |
| Gold medal – first place | 2019 Dubai | 200 m T35 |
| Gold medal – first place | 2023 Paris | 100 m T35 |
| Gold medal – first place | 2023 Paris | 200 m T35 |
| Bronze medal – third place | 2025 New Delhi | 200 m T35 |
European Championships
| Gold medal – first place | 2018 Berlin | 100 m T35 |
| Gold medal – first place | 2018 Berlin | 200 m T35 |
| Gold medal – first place | 2021 Bydgoszcz | 200 m T35 |
| Bronze medal – third place | 2021 Bydgoszcz | 100 m T35 |

Ihor Tsvietov (Ukrainian: Ігор Сергійович Цвєтов; born 2 March 1994) is a Ukrainian Paralympic athlete with cerebral palsy. He competes as T35-classified athlete in 100 and 200 metres sprinting events. He won two gold medals at the 2016 Summer Paralympics held in Rio de Janeiro, Brazil: in the men's 100 metres T35 event and in the men's 200 metres T35 event. He also won the silver medal in the men's 100 metres T35 and men's 200 metres T35 events at the 2020 Summer Paralympics in Tokyo, Japan.

== Career ==
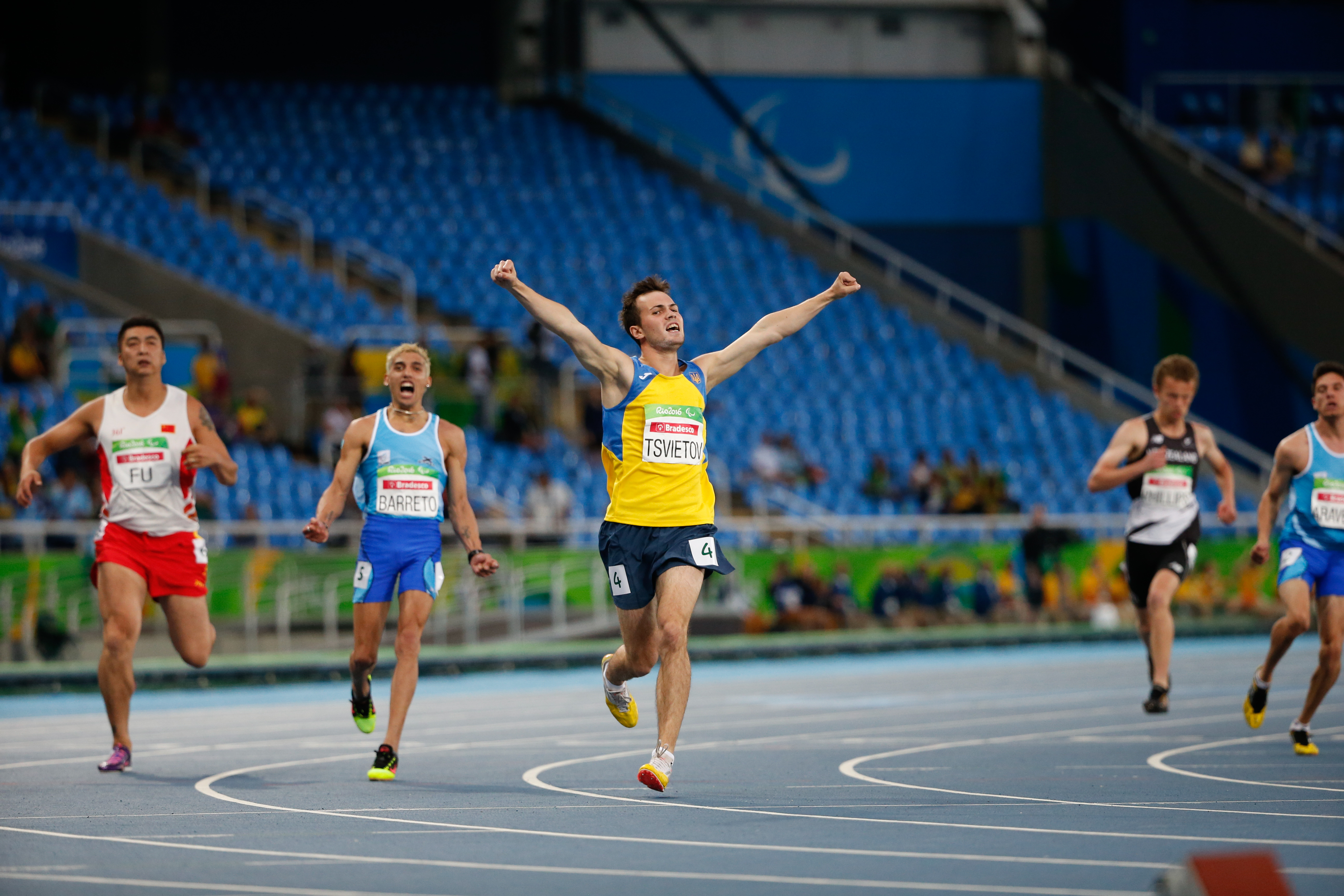
Tsvietov winning the 100 metres T35 event at the 2016 Summer Paralympics.

He won the gold medal in the men's 100 metres T35 and men's 200 metres T35 events at the 2017 World Para Athletics Championships held in London, United Kingdom.

Tsvietov also won the gold medals in the men's 100 metres T35 and men's 200 metres T35 events at the 2018 World Para Athletics European Championships. In both events he was the only medalist as there were only two competitors, Tsvietov and Jordan Howe, in these events.

At the 2019 World Para Athletics Championships held in Dubai, United Arab Emirates, he set a new world-record time of 11.07s in the men's 100 metres T35 event and also a new world-record time of 23.04s in the men's 200 metres T35 event.

After winning the silver medal at the 100 m T35 during the 2020 Tokyo Paralympics Tsvetov refused to take a joint photo with Russian bronze and gold medallist Artem Kalashian and Dmitrii Safronov due to strained Russia–Ukraine relations.

In 2023, he won the gold medal in the men's 100 metres T35 and men's 200 metres T35 events at the World Para Athletics Championships held in Paris, France.

Ihor Tsvietov firmly claimed the gold medal in the 100-metre race among representatives of the T35 class at the Paralympic Games 2024 in Paris, shaving four hundredths of a second off the world record.

== Achievements ==
| Year | Competition | Venue | Position | Event | Notes |
Representing Ukraine
| 2016 | Summer Paralympics | Rio de Janeiro, Brazil | 1st | 100 m | 12.31s |
| 2016 | Summer Paralympics | Rio de Janeiro, Brazil | 1st | 200 m | 25.11s |
| 2017 | World Championships | London, United Kingdom | 1st | 100 m | 12.38s |
| 2017 | World Championships | London, United Kingdom | 1st | 200 m | 25.52s |
| 2018 | European Championships | Berlin, Germany | 1st | 100 m | 12.77s |
| 2018 | European Championships | Berlin, Germany | 1st | 200 m | 26.10s |
| 2019 | World Championships | Dubai, United Arab Emirates | 1st | 100 m | 11.77s |
| 2019 | World Championships | Dubai, United Arab Emirates | 1st | 200 m | 23.04s |
| 2021 | European Championships | Bydgoszcz, Poland | 3rd | 100 m | 11.90s |
| 2021 | European Championships | Bydgoszcz, Poland | 1st | 200 m | 23.14s |
| 2021 | Summer Paralympics | Tokyo, Japan | 2nd | 100 m | 11.47s |
| 2021 | Summer Paralympics | Tokyo, Japan | 2nd | 200 m | 23.25s |
| 2023 | World Championships | Paris, France | 1st | 100 m | 11.78s |
| 2023 | World Championships | Paris, France | 1st | 200 m | 23.30s |
| 2024 | Summer Paralympics | Paris, France | 1st | 100 m | 11.43s |
| 2024 | Summer Paralympics | Paris, France | 1st | 200 m | 23.19s |
