= 2024 World Para Athletics Championships – Men's 200 metres =

The men's 200 metres at the 2024 World Para Athletics Championships were held in Kobe.

== Medalists ==
Event	Gold	Silver	Bronze
T35	David Dzhatiev; Neutral Paralympic Athletes (NPA)	Dmitrii Safronov; Neutral Paralympic Athletes (NPA)	Artem Kalashian; Neutral Paralympic Athletes (NPA)
T37	Andrey Vdovin; Neutral Paralympic Athletes (NPA)	Michał Kotkowski; Poland	Saptoyogo Purnomo; Indonesia
T51	Roger Habsch; Belgium	Mohamed Berrahal; Algeria	Edgar Navarro; Mexico
T64	Wallison Andre Fortes; Brazil	Kengo Oshima; Japan	Mitchell Joynt; New Zealand

== T35 ==
The event final took place on 20 May.

Rank	Lane	Name	Nationality	Time	Notes
1st place, gold medalist(s)	5	David Dzhatiev	Neutral Paralympic Athletes (NPA)	23.39	SB
2nd place, silver medalist(s)	7	Dmitrii Safronov	Neutral Paralympic Athletes (NPA)	23.58	SB
3rd place, bronze medalist(s)	8	Artem Kalashian	Neutral Paralympic Athletes (NPA)	23.81	SB
4	6	Maximiliano Villa	Argentina	24.97	SB
