= Athletics at the 2020 Summer Paralympics – Men's 100 metres T38 =

Men's 100 metres T38 at the XVI Paralympic Games
- Venue: Tokyo National Stadium
- Dates: 28 August 2021 (final)
- Competitors: 15 from 11 nations
- Winning time: 10.94

Medalists
1st place, gold medalist(s)		Thomas Young	Great Britain
2nd place, silver medalist(s)		Zhu Dening	China
3rd place, bronze medalist(s)		Evan O'Hanlon	Australia

Men's 100 metres
T11 · T12 · T13 · T33 · T34 · T35 · T36 · T37 · T38 · T47 · T51 · T52 · T53 · T54 · T63 · T64

The men's 100 metres T38 event at the 2020 Summer Paralympics in Tokyo took place on 28 August 2021.

The T38 category is for ambulant athletes with cerebral palsy. T38 athletes have the mildest form of impairment caused by cerebral palsy, often in only one limb, and not affecting the ability to run, walk or jump freely, although impairing performance. T38 athletes may suffer minor co-ordination difficulties.

== Records ==
Prior to the competition, the existing records were as follows:

World Record	Hu Jianwen (CHN)	10.74	Rio de Janeiro, Brazil	13 September 2016
Paralympic Record	Hu Jianwen (CHN)	10.74	Rio de Janeiro, Brazil	13 September 2016

Area	Time	Athlete	Nation
Africa	11.11	Dyan Buis	South Africa
America	11.08	Edson Pinheiro	Brazil
Asia	10.74 WR	Hu Jianwen	China
Europe	11.00	Thomas Young	Great Britain
Oceania	10.79	Evan O'Hanlon	Australia

== Results ==
=== Heats ===
Heat 1 took place on 28 August 2021, at 11:10:

Rank	Lane	Name	Nationality	Time	Notes
1	6	Zhu Dening	China	11.15	Q, SB
2	4	Dimitri Jozwicki	France	11.30	Q, PB
3	2	Zhong Huanghao	China	11.56	Q, SB
4	3	Farhat Chida	Tunisia	11.64	q, SB
5	7	Edson Pinheiro	Brazil	11.70	SB
6	8	Juan Gómez Coa	Colombia	11.98	SB
7	5	Ari Gesini	Australia	12.40	

Heat 2 took place on 28 August 2021, at 11:16:

Rank	Lane	Name	Nationality	Time	Notes
1	4	Thomas Young	Great Britain	11.22	Q
2	7	Evan O'Hanlon	Australia	11.31	Q, SB
3	5	José Lemos	Colombia	11.43	Q, SB
4	2	Jose Rodolfo Chessani	Mexico	11.62	q, PB
5	3	Dyan Buis	South Africa	11.75	
6	9	Zhou Peng	China	11.89	PB
7	8	Carlos Velasquez	Honduras	13.81	SB
	6	Khetag Khinchagov	RPC	DQ	WPA 17.8

=== Final ===
The final took place on 28 August 2021, at 19:35:

Rank	Lane	Name	Nationality	Time	Notes
1st place, gold medalist(s)	7	Thomas Young	Great Britain	10.94	AR
2nd place, silver medalist(s)	5	Zhu Dening	China	11.00	=PB
3rd place, bronze medalist(s)	6	Evan O'Hanlon	Australia	11.00	SB
4	4	Dimitri Jozwicki	France	11.52	
5	9	José Lemos	Colombia	11.53	
6	8	Zhong Huanghao	China	11.63	
7	2	Farhat Chida	Tunisia	11.63	SB
8	3	Jose Rodolfo Chessani	Mexico	11.77	
