= Mitchell Joynt =

New Zealand para-athlete (born 1995)

Personal information
- Born: 10 April 1995 (age 31) Kaipara Flats, New Zealand

Sport
- Country: New Zealand
- Sport: Athletics
- Disability class: T64
- Events: 100 metres 200 metres 800 metres

Achievements and titles
- Paralympic finals: Paris 2024: 200 m
Medal record
Men's athletics
Representing New Zealand
World Championships
| Bronze medal – third place | 2023 Paris | 200 m T64 |
| Bronze medal – third place | 2024 Kobe | 200 m T64 |

Mitchell Joynt (born 10 April 1995) is a New Zealand para sprinter who competes in the T64 category. He is a medallist at the World Para Athletics Championships. He also competed in the 2024 Summer Paralympics.

== Early life ==
Born in Kaipara Flats, Joynt played hockey, rugby, snowboarding and archery in his youth. In early 2013, when he was 17, he was injured in an industrial accident and had his right leg amputated below the knee.

== Career ==
Joynt competed in the Auckland Marathon in 2017. It was here that he was spotted by Hamish Meacheam and accepted an offer from Meacheam to competed in para-athletics.

In 2019, Joynt made his international debut at the 2019 World Para Athletics Championships, competing in the 100 metres and 200 metres, finishing in eighth place in the latter. On 26 March 2022, he set a new world record with a time of 2:17.22 in the 800 m.

In 2023, Joynt competed in the World Para Athletics Championships and won the bronze medal in the 200 metres.

In March 2024, Joynt was named to the New Zealand squad for the 2024 World Para Athletics Championships. He was also named to that squad for the 2024 Summer Paralympics. In May, Joynt returned to the World Para Athletics Championships and again won the bronze medal in the 200 metres. Making his Paralympic debut, he competed in the 200 metres and finished in sixth place.

At the 2025 World Para Athletics Championships, Joynt competed in two events, including the 200 metres, where he finished in sixth place.
