= Erinn Walters =

Australian Paralympic athlete

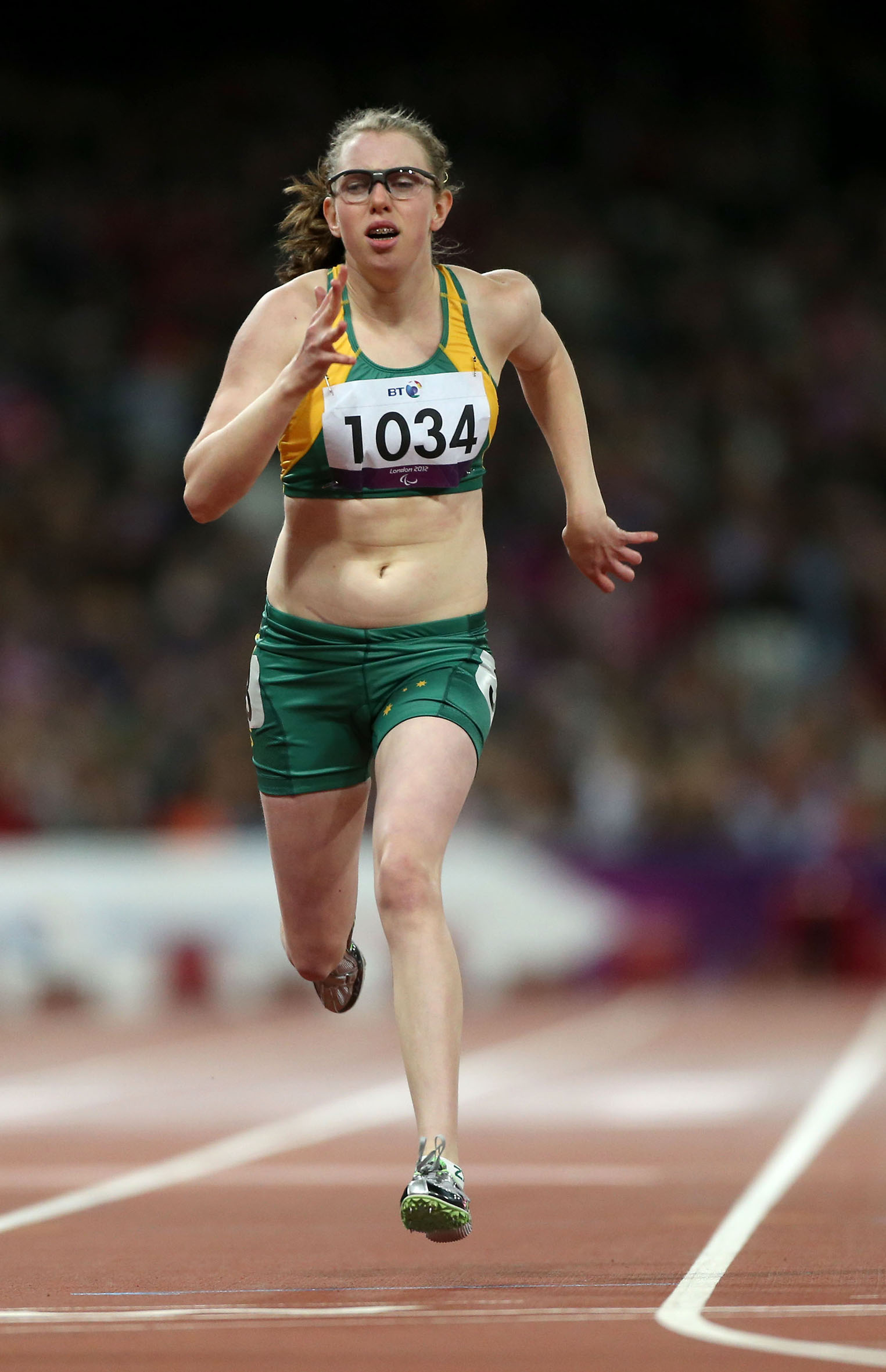
- Walters at the 2012 London Paralympics

Personal information
- Nationality: Australian
- Born: 11 May 1995 (age 31)

Sport
- Country: Australia
- Sport: Paralympic athletics

Erinn Walters (born 11 May 1995) is an Australian athletics competitor. She was selected to represent Australia at the 2012 Summer Paralympics in athletics.

== Personal life ==
Walters was born on 11 May 1995, and is from the Australian Capital Territory. At birth, she weighed 900 grams (2.0 lb). She has cerebral palsy. In 2010, she developed peritonitis and gangrene from a burst appendix. She attended a bilingual French and English-speaking school. In 2012, she was a year eleven student, and attended Canberra College. She was an Athletics Australia 2012–2013 Laurel Wreath Recipient.

== Athletics ==
Walters is a T35 classified athlete. She started competing in 2005. She competed in the 2008 National Championships, where she earned first-place finishes in the T35 100 metre, 200 metre and 400 metre events. At the 2010 Australian Junior AWD Championships, she set a national record in the U16 T35 200m event. She first represented Australia in 2011. She competed in the 2011 IPC Athletics World Championships. She finish sixth overall in the 100 metre event and fourth overall in the 200 metre event. At the 2012 Qantas Melbourne Track Classic, she finished tenth in the 100 metre event and eighth in the 200 metre event. She finished eighth in the 100 metre event at the 2012 Brisbane Track Classic. She finished ninth at the 2012 Adelaide Track Classic in the 200 metre event. At the 2012 Sydney Track Classic, she finished sixth in the 100 metre event. At the 2012 Australian Athletics Championships, she finished seventh in the 100 mete event and fifth in the 200 metre event. She was selected to represent Australia at the 2012 Summer Paralympics in athletics. She earned spots to compete in the 100metre and 200metre events. The trip to London was scheduled to be her first trip to Europe. She was one of the youngest members of Australia's athletics team. Before departing for London, she attended a farewell event in Canberra that was attended by Andrew Barr, the ACT Minister for Sport.
