= Fabrício Barros =

Brazilian para-athlete (born 1998)

Personal information
- Born: 17 January 1998 (age 28)

Sport
- Country: Brazil
- Sport: Para-athletics Track and Field
- Disability class: T12, T13
Medal record
World Championships
Silver medal – second place	2023 Paris	100 m T13
Bronze medal – third place	2019 Dubai	100 m T12
Bronze medal – third place	2025 New Delhi	100 m T13
Parapan American Games
Gold medal – first place	2019 Lima	100 m T11/12
Gold medal – first place	2023 Santiago	100 m T13

Fabricio Junior Barros Ferreira (born 17 January 1998), commonly known as Fabrício Barros, is a Brazilian para-athlete who has competed in the T12 and T13 classification of sprinting events. His most successful discipline is in the 100 metres and has also competed in the 200 metres and 400 metres.

== Career ==
Barros competed at the 2019 Parapan American Games, where he won the gold medal in the 100 m T11/12 event. At the 2019 World Para Athletics Championships held in Dubai, United Arab Emirates, he won the bronze medal in the men's 100 metres T12 event with a time of 10.84s. This meant that he qualified to represent Brazil at the 2020 Summer Paralympics held in Tokyo, Japan. Barros competed at the 2019 Parapan American Games, where he won the gold medal in the 100 m T11/12 event. At the delayed 2020 Summer Paralympics, he competed in the 100 metres and 400 metres.

At the 2023 World Para Athletics Championships, Barros competed in the 100 metres T13 event and won the silver medal. He also won a gold medal at the 2023 Parapan American Games in the 100 m T13 event. He competed at the 2025 World Para Athletics Championships and won a bronze medal in the 100 metres T13 event.
