= Yuki Oya =

Japanese Paralympic athlete

Personal information
- Born: 20 November 1981 (age 44) Nishinomiya, Japan

Sport
- Country: Japan
- Sport: Para-athletics
- Disability class: T52
Medal record
Paralympic Games
Silver medal – second place	2020 Tokyo	100 m T52

Yuki Oya (大矢 勇気, Ōya Yūki, born 20 November 1981) is a Japanese Paralympic athlete. He won the silver medal in the men's 100 metres T52 event at the 2020 Summer Paralympics held in Tokyo, Japan.

In 2019, he finished in 4th place in the men's 100 metres T52 event at the World Para Athletics Championships held in Dubai, United Arab Emirates.
