= Fábio da Silva Bordignon =

Brazilian Paralympic athlete (born 1992)

Fábio Bordignon
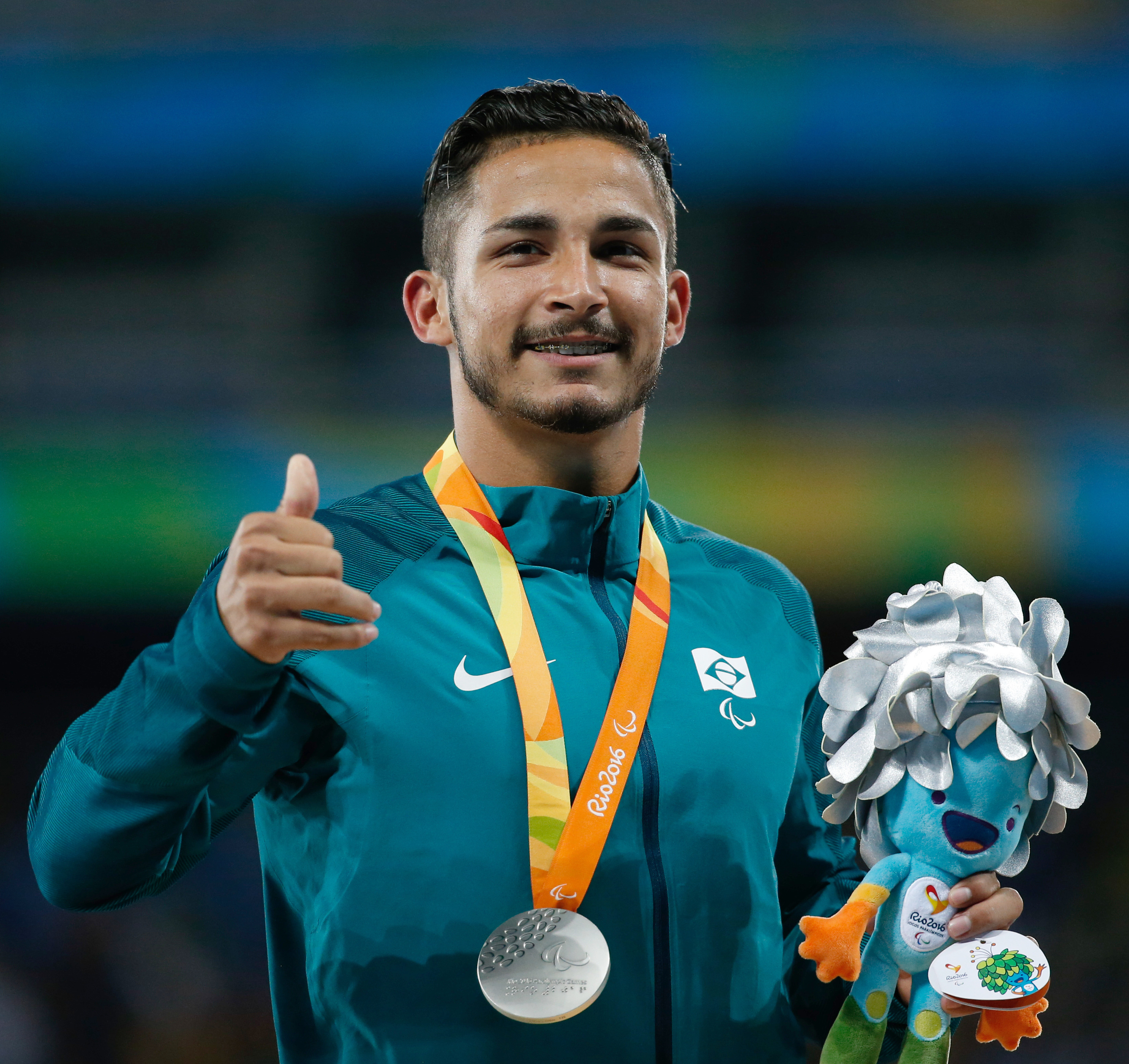
- Bordignon at Rio 2016 Paralympics

Personal information
- Full name: Fábio da Silva Bordignon
- Born: 20 June 1992 (age 34) Duque de Caxias, Rio de Janeiro, Brazil

Sport
- Country: Brazil
- Sport: Para-athletics
- Disability class: T35
- Events: 100 metres; 200 metres
Medal record
Paralympic Games
Silver medal – second place	2016 Rio de Janeiro	100 m T35
Silver medal – second place	2016 Rio de Janeiro	200 m T35
World Championships
Bronze medal – third place	2017 London	200 m T35
Bronze medal – third place	2023 Paris	100 m T35
Bronze medal – third place	2023 Paris	200 m T35
Parapan American Games
Gold medal – first place	2019 Lima	100 m T35
Bronze medal – third place	2019 Lima	200 m T35
Bronze medal – third place	2023 Santiago	200 m T35

Fábio da Silva Bordignon (born 20 June 1992) is a Brazilian Paralympic athlete competing in T35-classification events. He won two silver medals at the 2016 Summer Paralympics in Rio de Janeiro, Brazil. He also represented Brazil at the 2020 Summer Paralympics in Tokyo, Japan and the 2024 Summer Paralympics in Paris, France.

== Career ==
Bordignon represented Brazil at the 2016 Summer Paralympics in Rio de Janeiro, Brazil and he won the silver medals in both the men's 100 metres T35 and men's 200 metres T35 events. In both events, the gold and bronze medals were won by Ihor Tsvietov and Hernan Barreto, respectively.

At the 2017 World Para Athletics Championships in London, United Kingdom, he won the bronze medal in the men's 200 metres T35 event with a time of 26.94.

At the 2019 Parapan American Games held in Lima, Peru, Bordignon won the gold medal in the men's 100 metres T35 event and the bronze medal in the men's 200 metres T35 event. At the 2019 World Para Athletics Championships held in Dubai, United Arab Emirates, he finished in 4th place in both the men's 100 metres T35 and men's 200 metres T35 events.

Bordignon won two bronze medals at the 2023 World Para Athletics Championships held in Paris, France. He won the bronze medal in both the men's 100 metres T35 and men's 200 metres T35 events. Bordignon competed at the 2024 Summer Paralympics in Paris, France. He competed in the men's 100 metres T35 and men's 200 metres T35 events.

== Achievements ==
Year	Competition	Venue	Position	Event	Notes
Representing Brazil
2016	Summer Paralympics	Rio de Janeiro, Brazil	2nd	100 m	12.66s
2016	Summer Paralympics	Rio de Janeiro, Brazil	2nd	200 m	26.01s
2017	World Championships	London, United Kingdom	3rd	200 m	26.94s
2019	Parapan American Games	Lima, Peru	1st	100 m	
2019	Parapan American Games	Lima, Peru	3rd	200 m	
2023	World Championships	Paris, France	3rd	100 m	12.59s
2023	World Championships	Paris, France	3rd	200 m	25.40s
