= Washington Galvão =

Brazilian footballer

Personal information
- Full name: Washington Galvão Junior
- Date of birth: 5 June 1989 (age 37)
- Place of birth: Brazil
- Position: Striker

Senior career*
Years	Team	Apps	(Gls)
2008–2009	Apolonia	9	(2)
- * Club domestic league appearances and goals as of 23 May 2009 ‡ National team caps and goals as of 23 May 2009

Washington Galvão Junior (born 5 June 1989) is a Brazilian football player. His last club was KS Apolonia Fier.
