= Zhu Dening =

Chinese Paralympic athlete (born 1999)

Personal information
- Nationality: Chinese
- Born: 15 July 1999 (age 26) Xiamen, China

Sport
- Sport: Paralympic athletics
- Disability class: T38
Medal record
Representing China
Men's Para-athletics
Paralympic Games
Silver medal – second place	2020 Tokyo	100 m T38
World Championships
Gold medal – first place	2019 Dubai	100 m T38
Gold medal – first place	2019 Dubai	Long jump T38
Gold medal – first place	2023 Paris	Long jump T38
Silver medal – second place	2023 Paris	100 m T38
Asian Para Games
Gold medal – first place	2018 Jakarta	100 m T38
Gold medal – first place	2018 Jakarta	200 m T38
Gold medal – first place	2018 Jakarta	Long jump T37/38
Gold medal – first place	2022 Hangzhou	100 m T38
Gold medal – first place	2022 Hangzhou	Long jump T38

Zhu Dening (born 15 July 1999) is a Chinese Paralympic athlete. He represented China at the 2020 Summer Paralympics.

== Career ==
Dening represented China in the men's 100 metres T38 event at the 2020 Summer Paralympics and won a silver medal.
