= Harri Jenkins =

British Paralympic athlete

Personal information
- Nationality: British
- Born: 28 March 1996 (age 30) Neath

Sport
- Country: Great Britain
- Sport: Track and field
- Disability class: T33
- Club: DSW Para Academy Cardiff
- Coached by: Nathan Stephens
Medal record
Representing Great Britain
Men's athletics
Summer Paralympics
Bronze medal – third place	2020 Tokyo	100m - T33
World Championships
Bronze medal – third place	2019 Dubai	100 m T33
European Championships
Gold medal – first place	2018 Berlin	100 m T33

Harri Jenkins (born 28 March 1996) is a British Paralympic athlete who competes in sprint and middle-distance events in the T33 classification.

== Personal history ==
Jenkins was born in Neath, and resides in Bryncoch.

== Athletics career ==
Jenkins became involved in Para sport through Disability Sport Wales. Jenkins tried several sports through the Insport Series, before settling on wheelchair racing and wheelchair basketball. In his younger years competing in wheelchair basketball he moved to sprint racing and had great success.

He won gold in the men's T33 100m at the 2018 European Championships in Berlin, Germany, and bronze in the same event at the 2019 World Championships in Dubai, United Arab Emirates.

Jenkins won Bronze at the European championships 2021 in the ++T33++/T34 after having his wheelchair stolen in May.

Jenkins was a member of the Great Britain team to compete at the Tokyo Paralympics. He took part in the 100 metres (T33) sprint, finishing third in a time of 18.55 seconds.
