= Levi Vloet =

Dutch Paralympic sprinter (born 1996)

Personal information
- Nationality: Dutch
- Born: 23 February 1996 (age 30) Boxmeer, Netherlands

Sport
- Sport: Para athletics
- Disability class: T64
- Event: 200 metres
Medal record
Men's para athletics
Representing Netherlands
Paralympic Games
| Silver medal – second place | 2024 Paris | 200 m T64 |
European Championships
| Gold medal – first place | 2021 Bydgoszcz | 200 m T64 |
| Silver medal – second place | 2021 Bydgoszcz | 100 m T64 |

Levi Vloet (born 23 February 1996) is a Dutch T64 Paralympic sprint runner.

== Career ==
Vloet represented the Netherlands at the 2020 Summer Paralympics and finished in seventh place in the 200 metres T64 event. He again represented the Netherlands at the 2024 Summer Paralympics and won a silver medal in the 200 metres T64 event.

== Personal life ==
Vloet was born without a right foot. In July 2013, he had a lower leg amputation of his right leg.
