= David Dzhatiev =

Russian Paralympic athlete

Personal information
- Nationality: Russian
- Born: 16 August 2002 (age 23) Vladikavkaz, Russia

Sport
- Sport: Para-athletics
- Disability class: T35
- Event: Sprints
Medal record
Para-athletics
Representing Neutral Paralympic Athletes
World Championships
Gold medal – first place	2024 Kobe	200 m T35
Gold medal – first place	2025 New Delhi	200 m T35
Silver medal – second place	2024 Kobe	100 m T35
Silver medal – second place	2025 New Delhi	100 m T35

David Dzhatiev (born 16 August 2002) is a Russian Paralympic athlete who specializes in sprints.

== Career ==
Dzhatiev represented Russian Paralympic Committee athletes at the 2020 Summer Paralympics and finished in fourth place in both the 100 metres T35 and 200 metres T35 events.

In May 2024, Dzhatiev competed at the 2024 World Para Athletics Championships and won a gold medal in the 200 metres T35 event, and a silver medal in the 100 metres T35 event.
