= Dmitrii Safronov =

Russian Paralympic biathlete

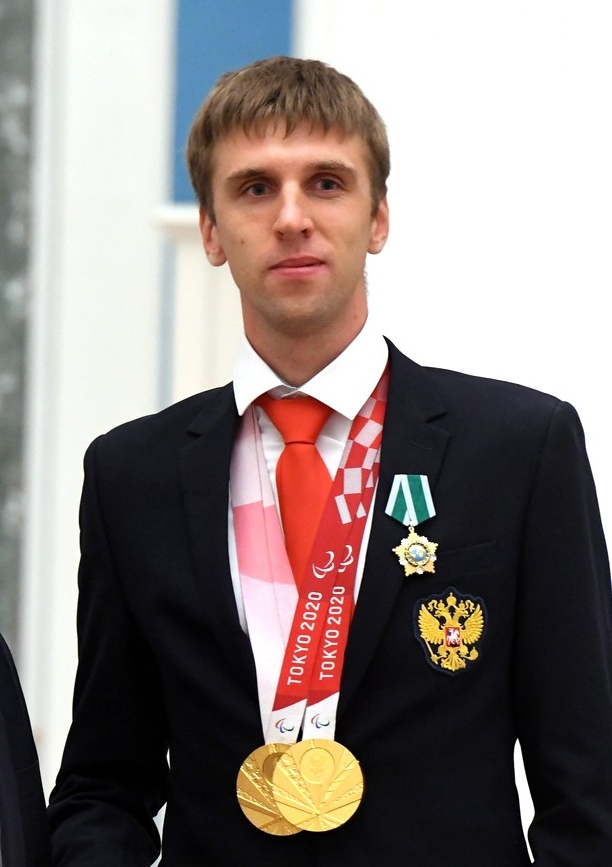
- Safronov in 2021

Personal information
- Native name: Дмитрий Дмитриевич Сафронов
- Full name: Dmitrii Dmitrievich Safronov
- Nationality: Russian
- Born: 12 October 1995 (age 30) Dzerzhinsk, Russia
- Education: Minin University, Nizhny Novgorod

Sport
- Sport: Paralympic athletics
- Disability class: T35
- Event: Sprints
- Club: Zarya Sports School of Olympic Reserve
- Coached by: Galina Kosheleva
Medal record
Para-athletics
Representing RPC
Paralympic Games
Gold medal – first place	2020 Tokyo	100 m T35
Gold medal – first place	2020 Tokyo	200 m T35
Representing Neutral Paralympic Athletes (NPA)
Paralympic Games
Silver medal – second place	2024 Paris	200 m T35
Bronze medal – third place	2024 Paris	100 m T35
World Championships
Silver medal – second place	2024 Kobe	200 m T35
Silver medal – second place	2025 New Delhi	200 m T35
Bronze medal – third place	2024 Kobe	100 m T35
Bronze medal – third place	2025 New Delhi	100 m T35
Representing Russia
World Championships
Gold medal – first place	2013 Lyon	100 m T35
Gold medal – first place	2013 Lyon	200 m T35
Gold medal – first place	2015 Doha	100 m T35
Gold medal – first place	2015 Doha	200 m T35
Silver medal – second place	2019 Dubai	200 m T35
Bronze medal – third place	2019 Dubai	100 m T35
European Championships
Gold medal – first place	2014 Swansea	100 m T35
Gold medal – first place	2014 Swansea	200 m T35
Gold medal – first place	2016 Grosseto	200 m T35
Gold medal – first place	2021 Bydgoszcz	100 m T35
Silver medal – second place	2016 Grosseto	100 m T35
Silver medal – second place	2021 Bydgoszcz	200 m T35

Dmitrii Dmitrievich Safronov (Russian: Дмитрий Дмитриевич Сафронов; born 12 October 1995) is a Russian Paralympic athlete who specializes in the 100 m and 200 m sprint.

== Career ==
Safronov is a four-time World Champion, having won gold in the 100m and 200m T35 events in 2013 and in 2015. In 2019 he won a silver and a bronze in the 200m and 100m, respectively.

Safronov represented Russian Paralympic Committee athletes at the 2020 Summer Paralympics and won gold medals in the 100 metres and 200 metres T35 events.
