= Artem Kalashian =

Russian Paralympic athlete (born 1996)

Personal information
- Nationality: Russian
- Born: 9 December 1996 (age 29) Брянск

Sport
- Sport: Paralympic athletics
- Disability class: T35
- Event: Sprints
- Club: Victoria Adaptive Sports School
- Coached by: Artyom Sumichev; Sumichev; Vyacheslav Sadovnikov
Medal record
Men's para-athletics
Representing RPC
Paralympic Games
Bronze medal – third place	2020 Tokyo	100 m T35
Representing Neutral Paralympic Athletes (NPA)
Paralympic Games
Silver medal – second place	2024 Paris	100 m T35
Bronze medal – third place	2024 Paris	200 m T35
World Championships
Gold medal – first place	2024 Kobe	100 m T35
Gold medal – first place	2025 New Delhi	100 m T35
Silver medal – second place	2024 Kobe	200 m T35
Representing Russia
World Championships
Silver medal – second place	2015 Doha	100 m T35
Silver medal – second place	2015 Doha	200 m T35
Silver medal – second place	2019 Dubai	100 m T35
Bronze medal – third place	2019 Dubai	200 m T35
European Championships
Gold medal – first place	2016 Grosseto	100 m T35
Silver medal – second place	2016 Grosseto	200 m T35
Silver medal – second place	2021 Bydgoszcz	100 m T35
Bronze medal – third place	2021 Bydgoszcz	200 m T35

Artem Kalashian (born 9 December 1996) is a Russian Paralympic athlete who specializes in sprints. He represented Russian Paralympic Committee athletes at the 2020 Summer Paralympics.

== Career ==
Kalashian represented Russian Paralympic Committee athletes at the 2020 Summer Paralympics in the men's 100 metres T35 event and won a bronze medal.
