= Michał Kotkowski =

Polish Paralympic athlete (born 1998)

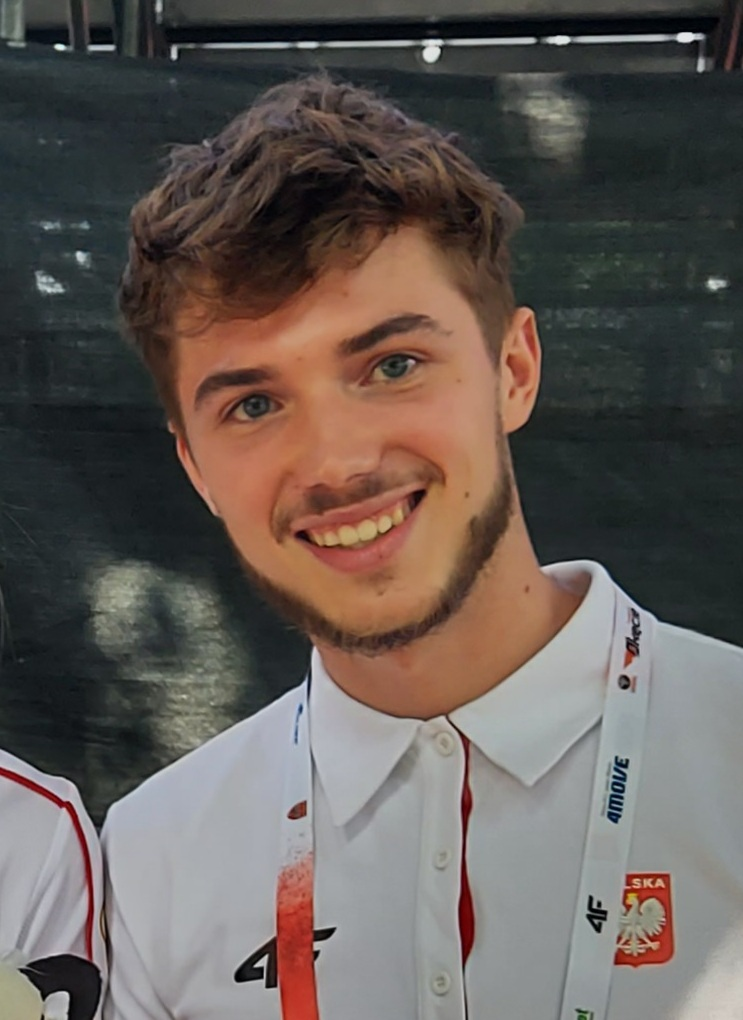

Personal information
- Born: 8 December 1998 (age 27) Poznań, Poland

Sport
- Country: Poland
- Sport: Para athletics
- Disability: Cerebral palsy
- Disability class: T37
- Club: SSR Start Poznań
- Coached by: Andrzej Wróbel
Medal record
Para athletics
Representing Poland
World Championships
Silver medal – second place	2023 Paris	400m T37
Silver medal – second place	2024 Kobe	200m T37
Bronze medal – third place	2017 London	400m T37
European Championships
Gold medal – first place	2018 Berlin	200m T37
Gold medal – first place	2018 Berlin	400m T37
Silver medal – second place	2020 Bydgoszcz	200m T37
Silver medal – second place	2020 Bydgoszcz	400m T37
Bronze medal – third place	2018 Berlin	100m T37

Michał Kotkowski (born 8 December 1998) is a Polish Paralympic athlete who competes in sprinting events at international track and field competitions.

== Career ==
Kotkowski won a bronze medal at the 2017 World Para Athletics Championships in the 400 metres T37 event. He won two gold medals at the 2018 World Para Athletics European Championships. He has also competed at the 2020 Summer Paralympics where he reached fourth place in the 400m T37. He is coached by former Paralympic champion Andrzej Wróbel.
