= Jordan Howe =

Paralympic Welsh athlete

Personal information
- Nationality: British
- Born: 12 October 1995 (age 30) Cardiff, Wales

Sport
- Country: Great Britain
- Sport: Athletics
- Event: Sprint
- Club: Federation of Disability Sport Wales

Achievements and titles
- Paralympic finals: 2012
- Personal best(s): 100 m: 12.52 s 200 m: 27.31 s
Medal record
Men's Paralympic athletics
Representing Great Britain
World Championships
Silver medal – second place	2017 London	100 m T35
European Championships
Bronze medal – third place	2014 Swansea	100 m T35
Bronze medal – third place	2014 Swansea	200 m T35
Bronze medal – third place	2016 Grosseto	100 m T35
Bronze medal – third place	2016 Grosseto	200 m T35

Jordan Howe (born 12 October 1995) is a Paralympian athlete from Wales competing in category T35 sprinting events. Howe qualified for the 2012 Summer Paralympics in the 100 m and 200 m sprint.

== History ==
Howe was born in Cardiff, Wales, in 1995. Howe, who has cerebral palsy, enjoyed sports from a young age, and was a youth swimmer at national level, being a member of the Dragons Disabled Swimming Club, before discovering athletics.

On 23 July 2017 Howe won a 100 m T35 Silver Medal at the World Para Athletics Championships London 2017, running a personal best of 12.52 seconds.
