= Hernán Barreto =

Argentine Paralympic athlete (born 1991)

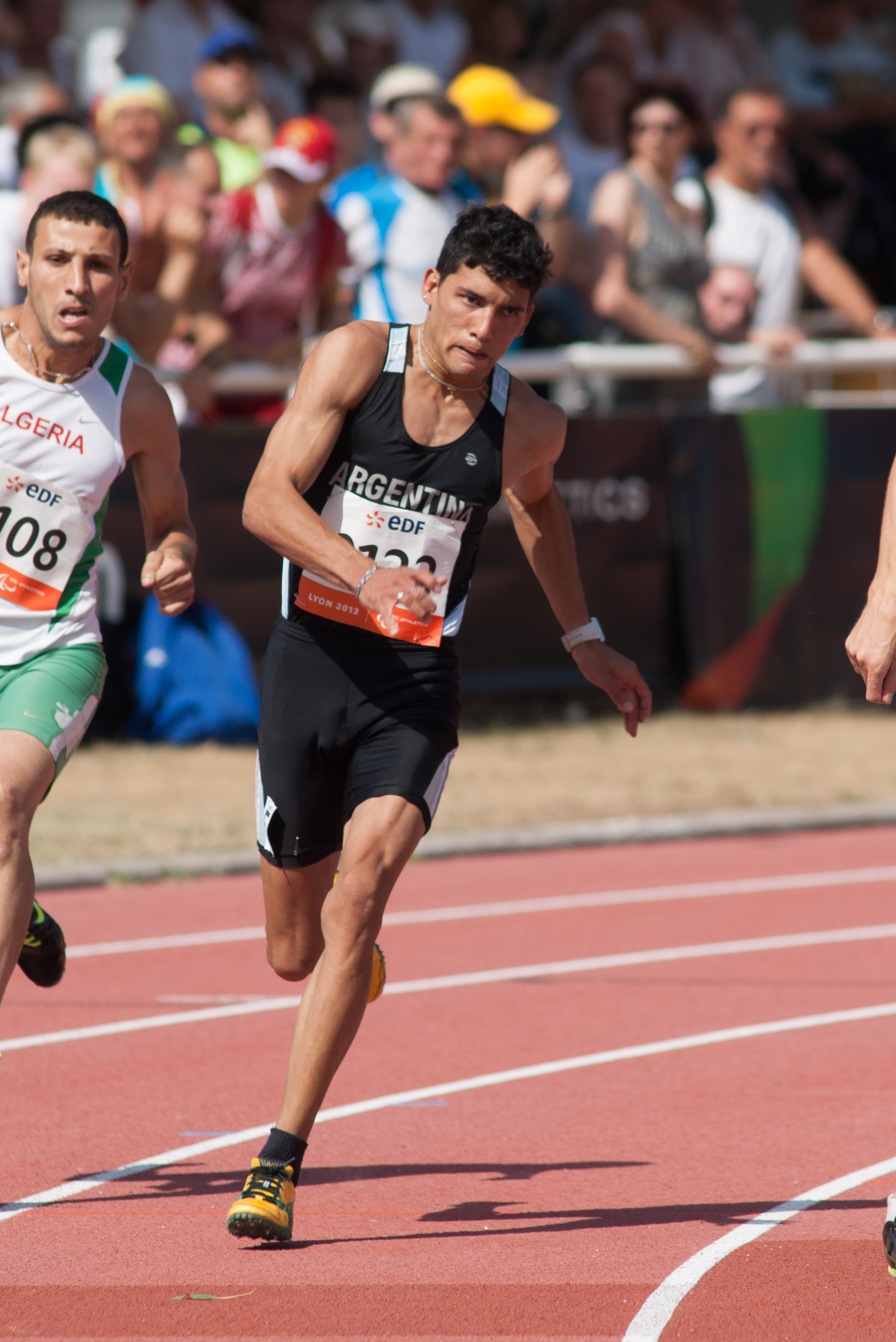
- Berrato at the 2013 World Championships in Lyon

Personal information
- Born: 14 April 1991 (age 35) Zárate, Argentina

Sport
- Country: Argentina
- Sport: Athletics
- Disability class: T35

Achievements and titles
- Paralympic finals: London 2012: Sprint
Medal record
Men's Athletics
Representing Argentina
Paralympic Games
| Bronze medal – third place | 2012 London | 200 m T35 |
| Bronze medal – third place | 2016 Rio de Janeiro | 100 m T35 |
| Bronze medal – third place | 2016 Rio de Janeiro | 200 m T35 |
IPC Athletics World Championships
| Bronze medal – third place | 2013 Lyon | 100 m T35 |
| Bronze medal – third place | 2013 Lyon | 200 m T35 |
Parapan American Games
| Gold medal – first place | 2011 Guadalajara | 100 m T35 |
| Gold medal – first place | 2015 Toronto | 100 m T35 |
| Gold medal – first place | 2019 Lima | 200m T35 |
| Silver medal – second place | 2019 Lima | 100m T35 |

Hernán Barreto Berrato (born 14 April 1991) is an Argentine Paralympic athlete who competes in disability athletics in the T35 category. He won the gold medal for the 200 metres at the 2012 Paralympic Games for his category with a new World Record. Barreto has also competed at two World Championships winning double bronze at the Lyon Games in 2013.
