= T35 (classification) =

Para-athletics classification

T35 (T for track) is a disability sport classification for disability athletics' running competitions. It includes people who have coordination impairments such as hypertonia, ataxia and athetosis. This includes people with cerebral palsy. The classification is used at the Paralympic Games. The corresponding F35 classification (F for (in)Field) includes club and discus throw, shot put, and javelin.

== Definition ==
This classification is for disability athletics. This classification is one of eight classifications for athletes with cerebral palsy, four for wheelchair athletes (T31, T32, T33, T34) and four for ambulant athletes(T35, T36, T37 and T38). Jane Buckley, writing for the Sporting Wheelies, describes the athletes in this classification as: "CP5, see CP-ISRA classes (appendix) Ambulant". The classification in the appendix by Buckley goes on to say "The athlete may need assistive devices for walking but not in standing or throwing. The athlete may have sufficient function to run but demonstrates poor balance". The Australian Paralympic Committee defines this classification as being for "Moderate problems in lower limbs. Good functional strength and minimal control problems in upper limbs. No wheelchair. May or may not use assistive devices". The International Paralympic Committee Athletics Classification Rules and Regulations state "A Class T35 athlete must have sufficient function to run on the track within the rules of IPC Athletics. Athletes who can perform this task but with difficulty may also fit the Sports Class Profile for T34". According to IPC rules, an ambulant athlete with spastic diplegia featuring lower limb spasticity Grade 3 is eligible to compete in either the T35 classification (running) or as a wheelchair racer in T34. The International Paralympic Committee defined this classification on their website in July 2016 as, "Coordination impairments (hypertonia, ataxia and athetosis)".

== Disability groups ==
Multiple types of disabilities are eligible to compete in this class. This class includes people who have cerebral palsy, or who have had a stroke or traumatic brain injury.

=== Cerebral palsy ===
==== CP5 ====
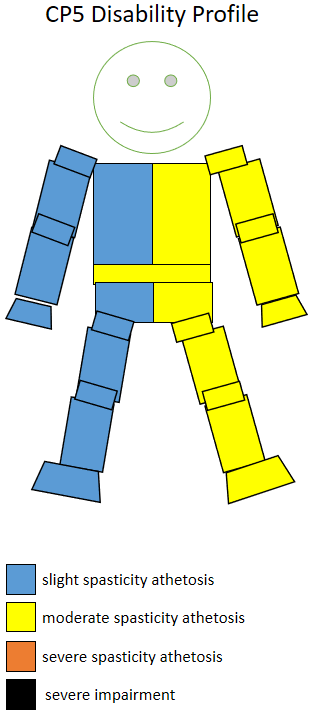
The spasticity athetosis level and location of a CP5 sportsperson.

CP5 sportspeople in this class have greater functional control of their upper body. They may require the use of an assistive device when walking but they do not require use of a wheelchair. They often have problems with their dynamic equilibrium but not their static equilibrium. Quick movements can upset their balance. In athletics, they have some balance issues in track events and field events that require either running or throwing.

== Rules and performance ==
Athletes in this class are not required to use a starting block. It is up to the individual. They have the option to start from a crouch, from a standing position or 3 point stance.

In track events, officials are encouraged to avoid keeping these athletes in the starting block too long. Because of these issues, athletes may make movements that normally would disqualify them as a false start. If an official believes movement could be a result of this, they can restart the entire field without disqualifying any runners.

== Events ==
Events that may be on the program for CP5 competitors include the club, discus throw, shot put and javelin.

== History ==
The classification was created by the International Paralympic Committee and has roots in a 2003 attempt to address "the overall objective to support and co-ordinate the ongoing development of accurate, reliable, consistent and credible sport focused classification systems and their implementation."

For the 2016 Summer Paralympics in Rio, the International Paralympic Committee had a zero classification at the Games policy. This policy was put into place in 2014, with the goal of avoiding last minute changes in classes that would negatively impact athlete training preparations. All competitors needed to be internationally classified with their classification status confirmed prior to the Games, with exceptions to this policy being dealt with on a case-by-case basis. In case there was a need for classification or reclassification at the Games despite best efforts otherwise, athletics classification was scheduled for September 4 and September 5 at Olympic Stadium. For sportspeople with physical or intellectual disabilities going through classification or reclassification in Rio, their in competition observation event is their first appearance in competition at the Games.

== Governance ==
Classification into this class is handled by the International Paralympic Committee. For national events, classification is handled by the national athletics organization.

== Becoming classified ==
Athletes with cerebral palsy or similar impairments who wish to compete in para-athletics competition must first undergo a classification assessment. During this, they both undergo a bench test of muscle coordination and demonstrate their skills in athletics, such as running and throwing. A determination is then made as to what classification an athlete should compete in. Classifications may be Confirmed or Review status. For athletes who do not have access to a full classification panel, Provisional classification is available; this is a temporary Review classification, considered an indication of class only, and generally used only in lower levels of competition.

== Competitors ==
Notable female competitors in the T35 class include Liu Ping (CHN), Sophia Warner (GBR), Oxana Corso (ITA), Virginia McLaughlin (CAN), Anna Luxova (CZE), Isis Holt (AUS), Rachael Dodds (AUS), Maria Lyle (GBR) and Erinn Walters (AUS).

In 2011, Fu Xinhan from China was ranked 1 in the world in the Men's 100 metre T35 event. Mokgalagadi Teboho from South Africa was ranked 2 in the world in the 100 metre event. Boukhalfa Allel from Algeria was ranked 3 in the world in the 100 metre event. Barreto Hernan from Brazil was ranked 4 in the world in the 100 metre event. Stein Niels from Germany was ranked 5 in the world in the 100 metre event.
