= List of Paralympic records in athletics =

The International Paralympic Committee recognises the fastest performances in athletics events at the Paralympic Games. Athletics has been part of every Summer Paralympic Games.

In Paralympic athletics competitions, athletes are given a class depending on the type and extent of their disability. The classes are as follows:

- 11–13: Blind and visually impaired
- 20: Intellectually disabled
- 32–38: Athletes with cerebral palsy; classes 32–34 compete in wheelchairs, while 35–38 are ambulant
- 40–46: Ambulant athletes with upper body amputations or other disabilities such as dwarfism
- 51–58: Wheelchair athletes with spinal cord injuries or amputations
- 61–64: Ambulant athletes with lower body amputations

== Men's ==
Key: Defunct category Not ratified or later rescinded by IPC

=== 100 m ===
Class	Record	Athlete	Nationality	Date	Games	Place	Ref.
T11	10.82 (+1.2 m/s)	Athanasios Ghavelas	Greece	2 September 2021	XVI	Tokyo, Japan	
T12	10.43 (+0.2 m/s)	Salum Ageze Kashafali	Norway	29 August 2021	XVI	Tokyo, Japan	
T13	10.42 (−0.1 m/s)	Skander Djamil Athmani	Algeria	1 September 2024	XVII	Paris, France	
T20	10.85	José Antonio Expósito	Spain	26 October 2000	XI	Sydney, Australia	
T32	Vacant						
T33	16.61 (+0.8 m/s)	Ahmad Almutairi	Kuwait	10 September 2016	XV	Rio de Janeiro, Brazil	
T34	14.76 (−0.8 m/s)	Chaiwat Rattana	Thailand	2 September 2024	XVII	Paris, France	
T35	11.39 (±0.0 m/s)	Dmitrii Safronov	RPC	30 August 2021	XVI	Tokyo, Japan	
T36	11.85 (−0.1 m/s)	Deng Peicheng	China	4 September 2021	XVI	Tokyo, Japan	
T36	11.85 (+0.8 m/s)	James Turner	Australia	7 September 2024	XVII	Paris, France	
T37	10.95 (+0.3 m/s)	Nick Mayhugh	United States	27 August 2021	XVI	Tokyo, Japan	
T38	10.64 (+0.9 m/s)	Jaydin Blackwell	United States	31 August 2024	XVII	Paris, France	
T42	12.04 (−0.5 m/s)	Anton Prokhorov	RPC	30 August 2021	XVI	Tokyo, Japan	
T43	vacant						
T43	10.90 (+0.9 m/s)	Liam Malone	New Zealand	8 September 2016	XV	Rio de Janeiro, Brazil	
T44	11.03 (+0.3 m/s)	Mpumelelo Mhlongo	South Africa	30 August 2021	XVI	Tokyo, Japan	
T44	10.81 (+0.4 m/s)	Jonnie Peacock	Great Britain	8 September 2016	XV	Rio de Janeiro, Brazil	
T45	10.94 (+0.2 m/s)	Yohansson Nascimento	Brazil	6 September 2012	XIV	London, United Kingdom	
T46/T47	10.53 (+0.3 m/s)	Petrúcio Ferreira	Brazil	27 August 2021	XVI	Tokyo, Japan	
T51	19.63 (−0.3 m/s)	Cody Fournie	Canada	6 September 2024	XVII	Paris, France	
T52	16.21 (−0.2 m/s)	Maxime Carabin	Belgium	5 September 2024	XVII	Paris, France	
T53	14.20 (+0.8 m/s)	Pongsakorn Paeyo	Thailand	1 September 2021	XVI	Tokyo, Japan	
T54	13.63 (+1.0 m/s)	Leo-Pekka Tahti	Finland	1 September 2012	XIV	London, United Kingdom	
T61	Vacant						
T62	10.79 (+0.1 m/s)	Johannes Floors	Germany	29 August 2021	XVI	Tokyo, Japan	
T62	10.79 (+0.3 m/s)	Johannes Floors	Germany	30 August 2021	XVI	Tokyo, Japan	
T63	12.05 (−0.5 m/s)	Vinícius Gonçalves Rodrigues	Brazil	30 August 2021	XVI	Tokyo, Japan	
T63	12.05 (+0.2 m/s)	Puseletso Mabote	South Africa	1 September 2024	XVII	Paris, France	
T64	10.65 (+0.2 m/s)	Sherman Guity	Costa Rica	2 September 2024	XVII	Paris, France	

=== 200 m ===
Class	Record	Athlete	Nationality	Date	Games	Place	Ref.
T11	22.44 (±0.0 m/s)	Ananias Shikongo	Namibia	15 September 2016	XV	Rio de Janeiro, Brazil	
T12	21.56 (+1.0 m/s)	Mateusz Michalski	Poland	8 September 2012	XIV	London, United Kingdom	
T13	21.05 (−0.3 m/s)	Jason Smyth	Ireland	7 September 2012	XIV	London, United Kingdom	
T32	Vacant						
T33	31.02 (−0.3 m/s)	Ahmad Almutairi	Kuwait	4 September 2012	XIV	London, United Kingdom	
T34	27.98 (−0.3 m/s)	Walid Ktila	Tunisia	4 September 2012	XIV	London, United Kingdom	
T35	23.00 (+0.3 m/s)	Dmitrii Safronov	RPC	4 September 2021	XVI	Tokyo, Japan	
T36	24.65 (−0.2 m/s)	Wa Wai So	Hong Kong	15 September 2008	XIII	Beijing, China	
T37	21.91 (+1.0 m/s)	Nick Mayhugh	United States	4 September 2021	XVI	Tokyo, Japan	
T38	21.82 (−0.2 m/s)	Evan O'Hanlon	Australia	8 September 2012	XIV	London, United Kingdom	
T42	23.07 (+0.5 m/s)	Richard Whitehead	Great Britain	10 September 2016	XV	Rio de Janeiro, Brazil	
T43	21.06 (+0.6 m/s)	Liam Malone	New Zealand	12 September 2016	XV	Rio de Janeiro, Brazil	
T44	22.01 (+0.6 m/s)	David Prince	United States	12 September 2016	XV	Rio de Janeiro, Brazil	
T45	22.05 (+0.1 m/s)	Yohansson Nascimento	Brazil	2 September 2012	XIV	London, United Kingdom	
T46/T47	21.74 (+0.8 m/s)	Heath Francis	Australia	9 September 2008	XIII	Beijing, China	
T51	36.81 (+0.5 m/s)	Toni Piispanen	Finland	31 August 2021	XVI	Tokyo, Japan	
T52	30.25 (±0.0 m/s)	Raymond Martin	United States	8 September 2012	XIV	London, United Kingdom	
T53	25.61 (+0.2 m/s)	Huzhao Li	China	7 September 2012	XIV	London, United Kingdom	
T54	24.18 (+0.6 m/s)	Lixin Zhang	China	12 September 2008	XIII	Beijing, China	
T61	23.59 (±0.0 m/s)	Ntando Mahlangu	South Africa	3 September 2021	XVI	Tokyo, Japan	
T64	21.32 (+0.5 m/s)	Sherman Guity	Costa Rica	7 September 2024	XVII	Paris, France	

=== 400 m ===
Class	Record	Athlete	Nationality	Date	Games	Place	Ref.
T11	50.03	Jose Sayovo Armando	Angola	25 September 2004	XII	Athens, Greece	
T12	47.59	Abdeslam Hili	Morocco	2 September 2021	XVI	Tokyo, Japan	
T13	46.70	Skander Djamil Athmani	Algeria	2 September 2021	XVI	Tokyo, Japan	
T20	47.22	Daniel Martins	Brazil	9 September 2016	XV	Rio de Janeiro, Brazil	
T32	Vacant						
T33	1:03.77	Lachlan Jones	Australia	24 October 2000	XI	Sydney, Australia	
T34	54.17	Kazuya Maeba	Japan	26 October 2000	XI	Sydney, Australia	
T35	1:06.30	J. Rivero	Spain	21 August 1996	X	Sydney, Australia	
T36	52.80	James Turner	Australia	31 August 2021	XVI	Tokyo, Japan	
T37	49.34	Andrey Vdovin	Russia	1 September 2021	XVI	Tokyo, Japan	
T38	48.49	Jaydin Blackwell	United States	3 September 2024	XVII	Paris, France	
T42	Vacant						
T43	46.20	Liam Malone	New Zealand	15 September 2016	XV	Rio de Janeiro, Brazil	
T44	49.66	Michail Seitis	Greece	15 September 2016	XV	Rio de Janeiro, Brazil	
T45	49.21	Yohansson Nascimento	Brazil	4 September 2012	XIV	London, United Kingdom	
T46/T47	46.65	Aymane El Haddaoui	Morocco	7 September 2024	XVII	Paris, France	
T51	1:20.82	Peter Genyn	Belgium	17 September 2016	XV	Rio de Janeiro, Brazil	
T52	54.48	Maxime Carabin	Belgium	30 August 2024	XVII	Paris, France	
T53	46.61	Pongsakorn Paeyo	Thailand	29 August 2021	XVI	Tokyo, Japan	
T54	44.55	Dai Yunqiang	China	1 September 2024	XVII	Paris, France	
T62	45.85	Johannes Floors	Germany	3 September 2021	XVI	Tokyo, Japan	
T64	49.66	Michail Seitis	Greece	15 September 2016	XV	Rio de Janeiro, Brazil	

=== 800 m ===
Class	Record	Athlete	Nationality	Date	Games	Place	Ref.
T11	2:02.33	Rob Matthews	Great Britain	20 June 1984	VII	New York, United States	
T12	1:52.13	Abderrahim Zhiou	Tunisia	10 September 2008	XIII	Beijing, China	
T13	1:54.78	Abdelillah Mame	Morocco	15 September 2008	XIII	Beijing, China	
T20	Vacant						
T33	2:45.98	Jeremy Rempel	Canada	10 September 1992	IX	Barcelona, Spain	
T34	1:40.24	Mohamed Alhammadi	United Arab Emirates	14 September 2016	XV	Rio de Janeiro, Brazil	
T35	Vacant						
T36	2:02.39	James Turner	Australia	17 September 2016	XV	Rio de Janeiro, Brazil	
T37	1:57.22	Michael McKillop	Ireland	1 September 2012	XIV	London, United Kingdom	
T38	1:58.87	Malcolm Pringle	South Africa	20 September 2004	XII	Athens, Greece	
T42	Vacant						
T43	Vacant						
T44	2:08.79	Daniel Andrews	United States	26 September 2000	XI	Sydney, Australia	
T45	2:00.36	Jose Ferandez	Spain	19 August 1996	X	Atlanta, United States	
T46	1:51.82	Gunther Matzinger	Austria	8 September 2012	XIV	London, United Kingdom	
T51	2:45.78	Bart Dodson	United States	6 September 1992	IX	Barcelona, Spain	
T52	1:58.68	Abdellah Ez-Zine	Morocco	25 September 2004	XII	Athens, Greece	
T53	1:36.30	Huzhao Li	China	15 September 2008	XIII	Beijing, China	
T54	1:32.45	Choke Yasuoka	Japan	25 September 2004	XII	Athens, Greece	

=== 1500 m ===
Class	Record	Athlete	Nationality	Date	Games	Place	Ref.
T11	3:55.82	Yeltsin Jacques	Brazil	3 September 2024	XVII	Paris, France	
T12	3:44.43	Aleksandr Kostin	Russia	3 September 2024	XVII	Paris, France	
T13	3:48.29	Abdellatif Baka	Algeria	11 September 2016	XV	Rio de Janeiro, Brazil	
T13	3:46.20	Yassine Ouhdadi El Ataby	Spain	3 September 2024	XVII	Paris, France	
T20	3:45.40	Ben Sandilands	Great Britain	6 September 2024	XVII	Paris, France	
T33	Vacant						
T34	Vacant						
T35	Vacant						
T36	4:37.75	Artem Arefyev	Russia	26 September 2004	XII	Athens, Greece	
T37	4:06.95	Liam Stanley	Canada	4 September 2021	XVI	Tokyo, Japan	
T38	3:58.92	Nate Riech	Canada	4 September 2021	XVI	Tokyo, Japan	
T44	Vacant						
T45	4:08.26	Pedro Meza Zempoaltecatl	Mexico	20 September 2004	XII	Athens, Greece	
T46	3:50.15	Abraham Tarbei	Kenya	4 September 2012	XIV	London, United Kingdom	
T47	Vacant						
T51	5:13.43	Alvise Devidi	Italy	26 October 2000	XI	Sydney, Australia	
T52	3:29.13	Tomoki Sato	Japan	29 August 2021	XVI	Tokyo, Japan	
T53/T54	2:49.55	Marcel Hug	Switzerland	31 August 2021	XVI	Tokyo, Japan	

=== 5000 m ===
Class	Record	Athlete	Nationality	Date	Games	Place	Ref.
T11	14:48.85	Júlio Cesar Agripino	Brazil	30 August 2024	XVII	Saint-Denis, France	
T12	13:53.76	El Amin Chentouf	Morocco	3 September 2012	XIV	London, United Kingdom	
T13	14:33.33	Bilel Aloui	Tunisia	15 September 2016	XV	Rio de Janeiro, Brazil	
T20	Vacant						
T34	Vacant						
T35	17:42.42	James Sands	Great Britain	12 September 1992	IX	Barcelona, Spain	
T36	18:23.52	Claúdio da Silva	Brazil	12 September 1992	IX	Barcelona, Spain	
T37	16:34.36	Joseph Parker	United States	18 August 1996	X	Atlanta, United States	
T38	16:53.19	Ivan Hompanera Alvarez	Spain	27 October 2000	XI	Sydney, Australia	
T44	Vacant						
T45	15:37.84	Pedro Meza Zempoaltecatl	Mexico	27 September 2004	XII	Athens, Greece	
T46	14:20.88	Abraham Tarbei	Kenya	13 September 2008	XIII	Beijing, China	
T51	17:40.02	Bart Dodson	United States	11 September 1992	IX	Barcelona, Spain	
T52	13:10.86	Toshihiro Takada	Japan	19 September 2004	XII	Athens, Greece	
T53/T54	9:53.26	Marcel Hug	Switzerland	27 August 2021	XVI	Tokyo, Japan	

=== 10000 m ===
Class	Record	Athlete	Nationality	Date	Games	Place	Ref.
T11	31:37.25	Henry Wanyoike	Kenya	19 September 2004	XII	Athens, Greece	
T12	31:42.97	Henry Kirwa	Kenya	14 September 2004	XIII	Beijing, China	
T13	32:05.17	Kestutis Bartkenas	Lithuania	20 September 2004	XII	Athens, Greece	
T20	Vacant						
T37	Vacant						
T46	30:15.35	Jose Javier Conde	Spain	7 September 1992	IX	Barcelona, Spain	
T51	Vacant						
T52	Vacant						
T53/T54	20:51.86	Joel Jeannot	France	21 September 2004	XII	Athens, Greece	

=== 4 × 100 m ===
Class	Record	Athlete	Nationality	Date	Games	Place	Ref.
T11-T13	42.37	Felipe Gomes (T11); Guide: Jonas de Lima Silva; Daniel Silva (T11); Guide: Heitor de Oliveira Sales; Jerônimo da Silva (T12); Gustavo Araújo (T13)	Brazil	13 September 2016	XV	Rio de Janeiro, Brazil	
T35-38	44.81	Christopher Mullins (T38); Evan O'Hanlon (T38); Tim Sullivan (T38); Darren Thrupp (T37)	Australia	16 September 2008	XIII	Beijing, China	
T42-47	40.82	Markus Rehm (T44); David Behre (T43); Johannes Floors (T43); Felix Streng (T44)	Germany	12 September 2016	XV	Rio de Janeiro, Brazil	
T53/54	49.89	Li Huzhao (T53); Zhang Lixin (T54); Zhao Ji (T54); Zong Kai (T54)	China	8 September 2008	XIII	Beijing, China	

=== 4 × 400 m ===
Class	Record	Athlete	Nationality	Date	Games	Place	Ref.
T11-13	3:28.65	Carlos Lopes; José Alves; Jose Gameiro; Gabriel Potra	Portugal	24 October 2000	XI	Sydney, Australia	
T35-38	3:38.92	Abbes Saidi; Mohamed Charmi; Fares Hamdi; Farhat Chida	Tunisia	27 September 2004	XII	Athens, Greece	
T42-47	3:27.00	Danny Andrews; Raphew Reed Jr; Ryan Fann; Brian Frasure	United States	27 September 2004	XII	Athens, Greece	
T53/54	3:04.77	Cui Yanfeng; Li Huzhao; Liu Yang; Liu Chengming	China	16 September 2016	XV	Rio de Janeiro, Brazil	

=== High Jump ===
Class	Record	Athlete	Nationality	Date	Games	Place	Ref.
T11	1.59 m	Italo Sacchetto	Italy	19 October 1988	VIII	Seoul, South Korea	
T12	2.02 m	Ruslan Sivitski	Belarus	20 October 2000	XI	Sydney, Australia	
T13	1.98 m	J. Orcutt	United States	6 September 1992	IX	Barcelona, Spain	
T42	1.88 m	Sharad Kumar	India	3 September 2024	XVII	Paris, France	
T42	1.96 m	Arnold Boldt	Canada	17 June 1980	VI	Arnhem, Netherlands	
T44	2.19 m	Maciej Lepiato	Poland	12 September 2016	XV	Rio de Janeiro, Brazil	
T45	1.68 m	Matthias Berg	Germany	27 June 1984	VII	United States	
T46/T47	2.15 m	Roderick Townsend-Roberts	United States	29 August 2021	XVI	Tokyo, Japan	
T61	vacant						
T63	1.94 m	Ezra Frech	United States	3 September 2024	XVII	Paris, France	
T64	2.06 m	Derek Loccident	United States	6 September 2024	XVII	Paris, France	

=== Long Jump ===
Class	Record	Athlete	Nationality	Date	Games	Place	Ref.
T11	6.85 (+0.4 m/s)	Di Dongdong	China	30 August 2024	XVII	Paris, France	
T12	7.31 (+0.4 m/s)	Hilton Langenhoven	South Africa	13 September 2008	XIII	Beijing, China	
T13	7.54 (−0.9 m/s)	Luis Felipe Gutierrez	Cuba	1 September 2012	XIV	London, United Kingdom	
T20	7.60 (−1.2 m/s)	Abdul Latif Romly	Malaysia	11 September 2016	XV	Rio de Janeiro, Brazil	
T35	6.06 (+0.3 m/s)	Wei Guo	China	20 September 2004	XII	Athens, Greece	
T36	5.83 (+0.3 m/s)	Evgenii Torsunov	Russia	2 September 2024	XVII	Paris, France	
T37	6.77 (−0.1 m/s)	Guangxu Shang	China	13 September 2016	XV	Rio de Janeiro, Brazil	
T38	7.31 m (+0.6 m/s)	Zhu Dening	China	1 September 2021	XVI	Tokyo, Japan	
T42	6.70 (+0.4 m/s)	Heinrich Popow	Germany	17 September 2016	XV	Rio de Janeiro, Brazil	
T43	Vacant						
T44	8.21 (+0.4 m/s)	Markus Rehm	Germany	17 September 2016	XV	Rio de Janeiro, Brazil	
T45	6.75 (±0.0 m/s)	R. Alvarez	Spain	18 August 1996	X	Atlanta, United States	
T46/T47	7.41 (+0.2 m/s)	Roderick Townsend-Roberts	United States	14 September 2016	XV	Rio de Janeiro, Brazil	
T61	7.17 m (−0.4 m/s)	Ntando Mahlangu	South Africa	28 August 2021	XVI	Tokyo, Japan	
T62	7.04 m (+0.5 m/s)	Stylianos Malakopoulos	Greece	1 September 2021	XVI	Tokyo, Japan	
T63	7.68 m (+0.5 m/s)	Joel de Jong	Netherlands	31 August 2024	XVII	Paris, France	

=== Triple Jump ===
Class	Record	Athlete	Nationality	Date	Games	Place	Ref.
T11	13.71 m (+0.2 m/s)	Duan Li	China	12 September 2008	XIII	Beijing, China	
T12	15.37 m (+0.5 m/s)	Osamah Alshanqiti	South Africa	8 September 2008	XIII	Beijing, China	
T13	14.87 m (±0.0 m/s)	Enrique Cepeda	Cuba	18 August 1996	X	Atlanta, United States	
T20	Vacant						
T45	13.24 m (±0.0 m/s)	R. Alvarez	Spain	22 August 1996	X	Atlanta, United States	
T46/T47	15.20 m (+1.1 m/s)	Fuliang Liu	China	1 September 2012	XIV	London, United Kingdom	

=== Shot Put ===
Class	Record	Athlete	Nationality	Date	Games	Place	Ref.
F11	15.26 m	David Casinos	Spain	20 October 2000	XI	Sydney, Australia	
F12	17.04 m	Kim Lopez Gonzalez	Spain	28 August 2021	XVI	Tokyo, Japan	
F13	16.46 m	Haitao Sun	China	27 October 2000	XI	Sydney, Australia	
F20	17.61 m	Olegsandr Yarovyi	Ukraine	3 September 2024	XVII	Paris, France	
F32	12.97 m	Liu Li	China	31 August 2021	XVI	Tokyo, Japan	
F33	12.77 m	Cai Bingchen	China	7 September 2024	XVII	Paris, France	
F34	12.25 m	Ahmad Hindi	Jordan	4 September 2021	XVI	Tokyo, Japan	
F35	16.22 m	Wei Guo	China	14 September 2008	XIII	Beijing, China	
F36	17.18 m	Vladimir Sviridov	Russia	4 September 2024	XVII	Paris, France	
F37	17.52 m	Dong Xia	China	5 September 2012	XIV	London, United Kingdom	
F38	15.53 m	Ibrahim Ahmed Abdelwareth	Egypt	5 September 2012	XIV	London, United Kingdom	
F40	11.21 m	Miguel Monteiro	Portugal	1 September 2024	XVII	Paris, France	
F41	14.32 m	Bobirjon Omonov	Uzbekistan	2 September 2024	XVII	Paris, France	
F42	15.97 m	Aled Davies	Great Britain	12 September 2016	XV	Rio de Janeiro, Brazil	
F43	Vacant						
F43	14.21 m	Jorg Frischmann	Germany	18 August 1996	X	Atlanta, United States	
F44	Vacant						
F44	18.16 m	Jackie Christiansen	Denmark	31 August 2012	XIV	London, United Kingdom	
F45	Vacant						
F46	16.75 m	Greg Stewart	Canada	1 September 2021	XVI	Tokyo, Japan	
F52	10.23 m	Aigars Apinis	Latvia	31 August 2012	XIV	London, United Kingdom	
F53	9.66 m	Giga Ochkhikidze	Georgia	1 September 2024	XVII	Paris, France	
F54	12.06 m	Sergei Sokulskii	Russia	27 August 2021	XVI	Tokyo, Japan	
F55	12.63 m	Wallace Santos	Brazil	27 August 2021	XVI	Tokyo, Japan	
F56	13.49 m	Olokhan Musayev	Azerbaijan	15 September 2008	XIII	Beijing, China	
F57	15.96 m	Yasin Khosravi	Iran	6 September 2024	XVII	Paris, France	
T61	Vacant						
T62	Vacant						
T63	14.97 m	Tom Habscheid	Luxembourg	7 September 2024	XVII	Paris, France	
T64	18.16 m	Jackie Christiansen	Denmark	31 August 2012	XIV	London, United Kingdom	

=== Discus throw ===
Class	Record	Athlete	Nationality	Date	Games	Place	Ref.
F11	43.16 m	Alessandro Rodrigo Silva	Brazil	2 September 2021	XVI	Tokyo, Japan	
F12	52.51 m	Haitao Sun	China	27 September 2004	XII	Athens, Greece	
F13	53.61 m	Oleksandr Iasynovyi	Ukraine	23 October 2000	XI	Australia, Sydney	
F32	Vacant						
F33	Vacant						
F34	Vacant						
F35	54.13 m	Wei Guo	China	11 September 2008	XIII	Beijing, China	
F36	38.98 m	Wenbo Wang	China	11 September 2008	XIII	Beijing, China	
F37	59.75 m	Khusniddin Norbekov	Uzbekistan	8 September 2016	XV	Rio de Janeiro, Brazil	
F38	52.91 m	Javad Hardani	Iran	7 September 2012	XIV	London, United Kingdom	
F40	Vacant						
F41	Vacant						
F42	Vacant						
F42	47.08 m	Fanie Lombaard	South Africa	26 October 2000	XI	Australia, Sydney	
F43	61.72 m	Akeem Stewart	Trinidad and Tobago	16 September 2016	XV	Rio de Janeiro, Brazil	
F44	64.11 m	David Blair	United States	16 September 2016	XV	Rio de Janeiro, Brazil	
F45	Vacant						
F46	48.06 m	Jerzy Dabrowski	Poland	17 October 1988	VIII	Seoul, South Korea	
F51	12.74 m	Mohamed Berrahal	Algeria	29 August 2021	XVI	Tokyo, Japan	
F52	27.06 m	Rigivan Ganeshamoorthy	Italy	1 September 2024	XVII	Paris, France	
F53	26.21 m	Toshie Oi	Japan	14 September 2008	XIII	Beijing, China	
F54	32.97 m	Drazenko Mitrovic	Serbia	6 September 2012	XIV	London, United Kingdom	
F55	39.14 m	Nebojša Đurić	Serbia	30 August 2021	XVI	Tokyo, Japan	
F56	46.86 m	Claudiney Batista	Brazil	2 September 2024	XVII	Paris, France	
F57	Vacant						
F61	Vacant						
F62	Vacant						
F63	Vacant						
F64	61.14 m	Jeremy Campbell	United States	5 September 2024	XVII	Paris, France	

=== Javelin ===
Class	Record	Athlete	Nationality	Date	Games	Place	Ref.
F11	49.33 m	Bil Marinkovic	Austria	27 September 2004	XII	Athens, Greece	
F12	64.38 m	Pengkai Zhu	China	5 September 2012	XIV	London, Great Britain	
F13	74.49 m	Daniel Pembroke	Great Britain	5 September 2024	XVII	Saint-Denis, France	
F33	Vacant						
F34	41.16 m	Saeid Afrooz	Iran	4 September 2024	XVII	Saint-Denis, France	
F35	56.07 m	Wei Guo	China	8 September 2008	XIII	Beijing, China	
F36	42.88 m	Pawel Piotrowski	Poland	8 September 2008	XIII	Beijing, China	
F37	57.81 m	Dong Xia	China	9 September 2008	XIII	Beijing, China	
F38	63.81 m	José Lemos	Colombia	30 August 2024	XVII	Paris, France	
F40	37.51 m	Ahmed Naas	Iraq	4 September 2021	XVI	Tokyo, Japan	
F41	47.13 m	Sun Pengxiang	China	4 September 2021	XVI	Tokyo, Japan	
F42	57.99 m	Edenilson Floriani	Brazil	2 September 2024	XVII	Saint-Denis, France	
F43	57.32 m	Akeem Stewart	Trinidad and Tobago	9 September 2016	XV	Rio de Janeiro, Brazil	
F44	67.03 m	Dulan Kodithuwakku	Sri Lanka	2 September 2024	XVII	Saint-Denis, France	
F45	Vacant						
F46	67.79 m	Dinesh Priyantha	Sri Lanka	30 August 2021	XVI	Tokyo, Japan	
F52	17.55 m	Rod Farr	Australia	15 September 2008	XIII	Beijing, China	
F53	22.08 m	Abdolreza Jokar	Iran	12 September 2008	XIII	Beijing, China	
F54	31.35 m	Hamed Amiri	Iran	3 September 2021	XVI	Tokyo, Japan	
F55	35.30 m	Ali Naderi Darbaghshay	Iran	22 September 2004	XII	Athens, Greece	
F56	42.74 m	Claudiney Batista dos Santos	Brazil	12 September 2016	XV	Rio de Janeiro, Brazil	
F57	51.42 m	Hamed Heidari	Azerbaijan	28 August 2021	XVI	Tokyo, Japan	
F63	51.42 m	Helgi Sveinsson	Iceland	2 September 2016	XV	Rio de Janeiro, Brazil	
F64	68.55 m	Sumit Antil	India	30 August 2021	XVI	Tokyo, Japan	

=== Club throw ===
Class	Record	Athlete	Nationality	Date	Games	Place	Ref.
F31	Vacant						
F32	45.39 m	Liu Li	China	28 August 2021	XVI	Tokyo, Japan	
F51	29.96	Željko Dimitrijević	Serbia	16 September 2016	XV	Rio de Janeiro, Brazil	

=== Pentathlon ===
Class	Record	Athlete	Nationality	Date	Games	Place	Ref.
P11	2627	Sergey Sevostianov	Russia	24 October 2000	XI	Sydney, Australia	
P12	3403	Hilton Langenhoven	South Africa	12 September 2008	XIII	Beijing, China	
P13	3050	Jason Delesalle	Canada	23 August 1996	X	Atlanta, United States	
P36	Vacant						
P37	Vacant						
P38	Vacant						
P42	5792	Fanie Lombaard	South Africa	22 October 2000	XI	Sydney, Australia	
P44	4662	Jeremy Campbell	United States	11 September 2008	XIII	Beijing, China	
P51	Vacant						
P52/53	4195	David McCalman	New Zealand	27 October 2000	XI	Sydney, Australia	
P54-58	5806	Ling Yong	China	20 September 2004	XII	Athens, Greece	

== Women's ==
=== 100 m ===
Class	Record	Athlete	Nationality	Date	Games	Place	Ref.
T11	11.91 (+0.7 m/s)	Libby Clegg	Great Britain	9 September 2016	XV	Rio de Janeiro, Brazil	
T12	11.40 (+0.2 m/s)	Omara Durand	Cuba	9 September 2016	XV	Rio de Janeiro, Brazil	
T13	11.76 (+0.2 m/s)	Lamiya Valiyeva	Azerbaijan	3 September 2024	XVII	Paris, France	
T32	Vacant						
T33	21.59 (−0.4 m/s)	Kristen Messer	United States	31 August 2012	XIV	London, United Kingdom	
T34	17.42 (−0.1 m/s)	Hannah Cockroft	Great Britain	10 September 2016	XV	Rio de Janeiro, Brazil	
T35	13.00 (+1.2 m/s)	Zhou Xia	China	27 August 2021	XVI	Tokyo, Japan	
T36	13.61 (−0.6 m/s)	Shi Yiting	China	1 September 2021	XVI	Tokyo, Japan	
T37	13.13 (+1.6 m/s)	Georgina Hermitage	Great Britain	9 September 2016	XV	Rio de Janeiro, Brazil	
T38	12.62 (+0.6 m/s)	Sophie Hahn	Great Britain	9 September 2016	XV	Rio de Janeiro, Brazil	
T42	14.80 (±0.0 m/s)	Martina Caironi	Italy	17 September 2016	XV	Rio de Janeiro, Brazil	
T43	13.02 (+0.1 m/s)	Marlou van Rhijn	Netherlands	17 September 2016	XV	Rio de Janeiro, Brazil	
T44	12.93 (−0.4 m/s)	Sophie Kamlish	Great Britain	17 September 2016	XV	Rio de Janeiro, Brazil	
T45	14.00 (±0.0 m/s)	Giselle Cole	Canada	2 June 1980	VI	Arnhem, Netherlands	
T46/T47	11.95 (−0.2 m/s)	Yunidis Castillo	Cuba	4 September 2012	XIV	London, United Kingdom	
T51	Vacant						
T52	19.42 (+1.0 m/s)	Michelle Stilwell	Canada	17 September 2016	XV	Rio de Janeiro, Brazil	
T53	16.19 (+1.0 m/s)	Lisha Huang	China	8 September 2016	XV	Rio de Janeiro, Brazil	
T54	15.82 (+0.5 m/s)	Wenjun Liu	China	8 September 2012	XIV	London, United Kingdom	
T62	12.48 (−0.3 m/s)	Fleur Jong	Netherlands	5 September 2024	XVII	Paris, France	
T63	14.11 (+0.1 m/s)	Ambra Sabatini	Italy	4 September 2021	XVI	Tokyo, Japan	
T64	12.61 (−0.2 m/s)	Kimberly Alkemade	Netherlands	5 September 2024	XVII	Paris, France	

=== 200 m ===
Class	Record	Athlete	Nationality	Date	Games	Place	Ref.
T11	24.51 (+0.1 m/s)	Libby Clegg	Great Britain	13 September 2016	XV	Rio de Janeiro, Brazil	
T11	24.51 (+0.5 m/s)	Jerusa Geber dos Santos	Brazil	7 September 2024	XVII	Saint-Denis, France	
T12	23.05 (+0.1 m/s)	Omara Durand	Cuba	12 September 2016	XV	Rio de Janeiro, Brazil	
T13	25.51 (−0.3 m/s)	Nantenin Keita	France	13 September 2008	XIII	Beijing, China	
T32	Vacant						
T33	38.38 (−0.3 m/s)	Mary Rice	Ireland	25 October 2000	XI	Sydney, Australia	
T34	31.90 (+0.7 m/s)	Hannah Cockroft	Great Britain	6 September 2012	XIV	London, United Kingdom	
T35	28.22 (−0.9 m/s)	Zhou Xia	China	17 September 2016	XV	Rio de Janeiro, Brazil	
T36	28.60 (+0.2 m/s)	Fang Wang	China	26 September 2004	XII	Athens, Greece	
T37	28.42 (−0.3 m/s)	Lisa McIntosh	Australia	27 October 2000	XI	Sydney, Australia	
T38	27.39 (−0.7 m/s)	Junfei Chen	China	6 September 2012	XIV	London, United Kingdom	
T42	Vacant						
T43	26.16 (+0.7 m/s)	Marlou van Rhijn	Netherlands	15 September 2016	XV	Rio de Janeiro, Brazil	
T44	26.70 (−0.6 m/s)	Irmgard Bensusan	Germany	14 September 2016	XV	Rio de Janeiro, Brazil	
T45	Vacant						
T46/T47	24.45 (−0.6 m/s)	Yunidis Castillo	Cuba	1 September 2012	XIV	London, United Kingdom	
T51	Vacant						
T52	33.80 (−0.3 m/s)	Michelle Stilwell	Canada	1 September 2012	XIV	London, United Kingdom	
T53	29.17 (−0.4 m/s)	Lisha Huang	China	15 September 2008	XIII	Beijing, China	
T54	27.52 (+0.5 m/s)	Chantal Petitclerc	Canada	14 September 2008	XIII	Beijing, China	
T64	25.42 (+0.5 m/s)	Kimberly Alkemade	Netherlands	3 September 2024	XVII	Saint-Denis, France	

=== 400 m ===
Class	Record	Athlete	Nationality	Date	Games	Place	Ref.
T11	56.31	Cuiqing Liu	China	15 September 2016	XV	Rio de Janeiro, Brazil	
T12	51.77	Omara Durand	Cuba	17 September 2016	XV	Rio de Janeiro, Brazil	
T13	55.12	Omara Durand	Cuba	3 September 2012	XIV	London, United Kingdom	
T20	57.79	Breanne Clark	United States	13 September 2016	XV	Rio de Janeiro, Brazil	
T32	Vacant						
T33	1:20.16	Mary Rice	Ireland	28 October 2000	XI	Sydney, Australia	
T34	58.78	Hannah Cockroft	Great Britain	14 September 2016	XV	Rio de Janeiro, Brazil	
T35	1:38.65	Perla Amanda Munoz	Argentina	23 October 2000	XI	Sydney, Australia	
T36	1:06.96	Fang Wang	China	27 September 2004	XII	Athens, Greece	
T37	1:00.53	Georgina Hermitage	Great Britain	13 September 2016	XV	Rio de Janeiro, Brazil	
T38	1:00.71	Kadeena Cox	Great Britain	14 September 2016	XV	Rio de Janeiro, Brazil	
T42	Vacant						
T43	1:03.83	Federica Maspero	Italy	12 September 2016	XV	Rio de Janeiro, Brazil	
T44	59.27	Marie-Amelie Le Fur	France	12 September 2016	XV	Rio de Janeiro, Brazil	
T45	1:13.92	Giselle Cole	Canada	2 June 1980	VI	Arnhem, Netherlands	
T46/T47	55.72	Yunidis Castillo	Cuba	8 September 2012	XIV	London, United Kingdom	
T51	Vacant						
T52	1:05.43	Michelle Stilwell	Canada	10 September 2016	XV	Rio de Janeiro, Brazil	
T53	54.43	Hongzhuan Zhou	China	11 September 2016	XV	Rio de Janeiro, Brazil	
T54	51.91	Chantal Petitclerc	Canada	25 September 2004	XII	Athens, Greece	

=== 800 m ===
Class	Record	Athlete	Nationality	Date	Games	Place	Ref.
T11	2:19.07	Purificacion Santamarta-Bravo	Spain	12 September 1992	IX	Barcelona, Spain	
T12	2:04.96	Assia el Hannouni	France	9 September 2008	XIII	Beijing, China	
T13	2:13.01	Marla Runyan	United States	22 August 1996	X	Atlanta, United States	
T20	Vacant						
T33	Vacant						
T34	2:00.62	Hannah Cockroft	Great Britain	16 September 2016	XV	Rio de Janeiro, Brazil	
T35	Vacant						
T36	Vacant						
T37	Vacant						
T38	Vacant						
T43	Vacant						
T44	Vacant						
T45	Vacant						
T46	3:04.32	Joanne Scarlett	Great Britain	24 June 1984	VII	New York, United States	
T51	Vacant						
T52	2:29.13	Lisa Franks	Canada	21 October 2000	XI	Sydney, Australia	
T53	1:47.45	Hongzhuan Zhou	China	17 September 2016	XV	Rio de Janeiro, Brazil	
T54	1:44.73	Tatyana McFadden	United States	17 September 2016	XV	Rio de Janeiro, Brazil	

=== 1500 m ===
Class	Record	Athlete	Nationality	Date	Games	Place	Ref.
T11	4:37.40	Mónica Olivia Rodríguez	Mexico	30 August 2021	XVI	Tokyo, Japan	
T12	4:19.20	Assia El Hannouni	France	14 September 2008	XIII	Beijing, China	
T13	4:21.45	Somaya Bousaid	Tunisia	10 September 2016	XV	Rio de Janeiro, Brazil	
T20	4:24.37	Barbara Niewiedzial	Poland	16 September 2016	XV	Rio de Janeiro, Brazil	
T33	Vacant						
T34	Vacant						
T35	Vacant						
T36	Vacant						
T37	Vacant						
T38	Vacant						
T44	Vacant						
T45	Vacant						
T46	Vacant						
T51	Vacant						
T52	4:41.64	Lisa Franks	Canada	24 October 2000	XI	Sydney, Australia	
T53/T54	3:22.50	Tatyana McFadden	United States	13 September 2016	XV	Rio de Janeiro, Brazil	

=== 5000 m ===
Class	Record	Athlete	Nationality	Date	Games	Place	Ref.
T11	20:05.81	Sigita Markeviciene	Lithuania	28 October 2000	XI	Sydney, Australia	
T12	17:52.42	Rima Batalova	Russia	28 October 2000	XI	Sydney, Australia	
T13	Vacant						
T20	Vacant						
T34	Vacant						
T35	Vacant						
T36	Vacant						
T37	Vacant						
T38	Vacant						
T45	Vacant						
T46	Vacant						
T51	Vacant						
T52	Vacant						
T53/T54	11:47.37	Tatyana McFadden	United States	14 September 2016	XV	Rio de Janeiro, Brazil	

=== 10000 m ===
Class	Record	Athlete	Nationality	Date	Games	Place	Ref.
T53/T54	24:21.64	Jean Driscoll	United States	18 August 1996	X	Atlanta, United States	

=== 4 × 100 m ===
Class	Record	Athlete	Nationality	Date	Games	Place	Ref.
T11-13	47.18	Jia; Liu; Shen; Zhou	China	14 September 2016	XV	Rio de Janeiro, Brazil	
T35-38	50.81	Chen; Li; Jiang; Wen	China	15 September 2016	XV	Rio de Janeiro, Brazil	
T42-47	Vacant						
T53/54	57.61	Dong; Huang; Liu; Zhang	China	16 September 2008	XIII	Beijing, China	

=== High Jump ===
Class	Record	Athlete	Nationality	Date	Games	Place	Ref.
T11	1.45	Joke Rijswijk	Netherlands	19 October 1988	VIII	Seoul, South Korea	
T12	Vacant						
T13	1.35	M. Houghton	United States	24 June 1984	VII	New York, United States	
T42	Vacant						
T44	1.30	C. Cree	Australia	2 June 1980	VI	Arnhem, Netherlands	
T45	1.45	Giselle Cole	Canada	24 June 1984	VII	New York, United States	
T46/T47	1.66	Petra Quade	Germany	24 June 1984	VII	New York, United States	

=== Long Jump ===
Class	Record	Athlete	Nationality	Date	Games	Place	Ref.
T11	5.07 (±0.0 m/s)	Purificación Ortiz	Spain	19 August 1996	X	Atlanta, United States	
T12	6.60 (−0.9 m/s)	Oksana Zubkovska	Ukraine	7 September 2012	XIV	London, United Kingdom	
T13	5.74 (±0.0 m/s)	Marla Runyan	United States	22 August 1996	X	Atlanta, United States	
T20	6.00 (+1.0 m/s)	Karolina Kucharczyk	Poland	3 September 2012	XIV	London, United Kingdom	
T35	Vacant						
T36	3.13 (±0.0 m/s)	Angel James	United States	17 August 1996	X	Atlanta, United States	
T37	5.14 (−0.4 m/s)	Xiaoyan Wen	China	14 September 2016	XV	Rio de Janeiro, Brazil	
T38	5.63	Luca Ekler	Hungary	31 August 2021	XVI	Tokyo, Japan	
T42	4.93 (−0.4 m/s)	Vanessa Low	Germany	10 September 2016	XV	Rio de Janeiro, Brazil	
T44	5.83 (−0.5 m/s)	Marie-Amelie Le Fur	France	10 September 2016	XV	Rio de Janeiro, Brazil	
T45	5.37 (±0.0 m/s)	A. Ojastu	Estonia	21 August 1996	X	Atlanta, United States	
T46/T47	5.71 (+0.4 m/s)	Iryna Leantsiuk	Belarus	20 September 2004	XII	Atlanta, United States	

=== Shot Put ===
Class	Record	Athlete	Nationality	Date	Games	Place	Ref.
F11	16.74 m	Assunta Legnante	Italy	5 September 2012	XIV	London, United Kingdom	
F12	15.05 m	Safiya Burkhanova	Uzbekistan	14 September 2016	XV	Rio de Janeiro, Brazil	
F13	13.03 m	Tamara Sivakova	Belarus	21 October 2000	XI	Sydney, Australia	
F20	13.94 m	Ewa Durska	Poland	10 September 2016	XV	Rio de Janeiro, Brazil	
F32	8.00 m	Anastasiia Moskalenko	Ukraine	4 September 2024	XVII	Saint-Denis, France	
F33	5.72 m	Asmahane Boudjadar	Algeria	16 September 2016	XV	Rio de Janeiro, Brazil	
F34	8.75 m	Lijuan Zou	China	14 September 2016	XV	Rio de Janeiro, Brazil	
F35	13.91 m	Jun Wang	China	15 September 2016	XV	Rio de Janeiro, Brazil	
F36	11.41 m	Birgit Kober	Germany	17 September 2016	XV	Rio de Janeiro, Brazil	
F37	15.12 m	Lisa Adams	New Zealand	28 August 2021	XVI	Tokyo, Japan	
F38	12.58 m	Aldona Grigaliuniene	Lithuania	11 September 2008	XIII	Beijing, China	
F40	8.40 m	Lauritta Onye	Nigeria	11 September 2016	XV	Rio de Janeiro, Brazil	
F41	10.19 m	Raoua Tlili	Tunisia	9 September 2016	XV	Rio de Janeiro, Brazil	
F42	10.06 m	Baozhu Zheng	China	9 September 2008	XIII	Beijing, China	
F43	8.50 m	Madeleine Deouwi	France	11 September 1992	IX	Barcelona, Spain	
F44	13.05 m	Juan Yao	China	3 September 2012	XIV	London, United Kingdom	
F45	Vacant						
F46	14.06 m	Noelle Malkamaki	United States	4 September 2024	XVII	Saint-Denis, France	
F52	5.69 m	Antonia Balek	Croatia	15 September 2008	XIII	Beijing, China	
F53	4.76 m	Fatema Nedham	Bahrain	12 September 2016	XV	Rio de Janeiro, Brazil	
F54	7.89 m	Liwan Yang	China	10 September 2016	XV	Rio de Janeiro, Brazil	
F55	9.06 m	Marianne Buggenhagen	Germany	19 September 2004	XII	Athens, Greece	
F56	9.92 m	Nadia Medjmedj	Algeria	8 September 2016	XV	Rio de Janeiro, Brazil	
F57	10.94 m	Angeles Ortiz Hernandez	Mexico	8 September 2016	XV	Rio de Janeiro, Brazil	

=== Discus Throw ===
Class	Record	Athlete	Nationality	Date	Games	Place	Ref.
F11	40.13	Liangmin Zhang	China	1 September 2012	XIV	London, United Kingdom	
F12	45.06	Liudya Maso Belicer	Cuba	19 August 1996	X	Atlanta, United States	
F13	44.67	Liudya Maso Belicer	Cuba	23 October 2000	XI	Sydney, Australia	
F32	Vacant						
F33	Vacant						
F34	Vacant						
F35	30.12	Mariia Pomazan	Ukraine	31 August 2012	XIV	London, United Kingdom	
F36	28.01	Qing Wu	China	31 August 2012	XIV	London, United Kingdom	
F37	37.60	Na Mi	China	17 September 2016	XV	Rio de Janeiro, Brazil	
F38	31.71	Noelle Lenihan	Ireland	17 September 2016	XV	Rio de Janeiro, Brazil	
F40	23.34	Renata Sliwinska	Poland	15 September 2016	XV	Rio de Janeiro, Brazil	
F41	33.38	Raoua Tlili	Tunisia	15 September 2016	XV	Rio de Janeiro, Brazil	
F42	33.19	Baozhu Zheng	China	15 September 2008	XIII	Beijing, China	
F43	32.22	Stela Eneva	Bulgaria	25 September 2004	XII	Athens, Greece	
F44	44.53	Juan Yao	China	11 September 2016	XV	Rio de Janeiro, Brazil	
F45	Vacant						
F46	42.12	Hong Ping Wu	China	25 September 2004	XII	Athens, Greece	
F51	13.09	Rachael Morrison	United States	14 September 2016	XV	Rio de Janeiro, Brazil	
F52	13.39	Martina Kniezkova	Czech Republic	10 September 2008	XIII	Beijing, China	
F53	12.59	Estela Salas	Mexico	10 September 2008	XIII	Beijing, China	
F54	19.88	Miroslava Behalova	Czech Republic	17 August 1996	X	Atlanta, United States	
F55	27.80	Marianne Buggenhagen	Germany	9 September 2008	XIII	Beijing, China	
F56	24.30	Suely Guimarães	Brazil	25 September 2004	XII	Athens, Greece	
F57	33.33	Nassima Saifi	Algeria	15 September 2016	XV	Rio de Janeiro, Brazil	

=== Javelin ===
Class	Record	Athlete	Nationality	Date	Games	Place	Ref.
F11	38.62	Martina Willing	Germany	6 September 1992	IX	Barcelona, Spain	
F12	42.58	Irada Aliyeva	Azerbaijan	17 September 2016	XV	Rio de Janeiro, Brazil	
F13	44.58	Nozimakhon Kayumova	Uzbekistan	17 September 2016	XV	Rio de Janeiro, Brazil	
F33	Vacant						
F34	21.86	Lijuan Zou	China	9 September 2016	XV	Rio de Janeiro, Brazil	
F35	25.59	Renata Chilewska	Poland	10 September 2008	XIII	Beijing, China	
F36	28.84	Qing Wu	China	10 September 2008	XIII	Beijing, China	
F37	37.86	Shirlene Coelho	Brazil	8 September 2012	XIV	London, United Kingdom	
F38	28.47	Katrina Webb	Australia	21 September 2004	XII	Athens, Greece	
F40	Vacant						
F41	Vacant						
F42	31.05	Baozhu Zheng	China	8 September 2008	XIII	Beijing, China	
F44	40.51	Juan Yao	China	8 September 2008	XIII	Beijing, China	
F45	Vacant						
F46	43.01	Hollie Arnold	Great Britain	13 September 2016	XV	Rio de Janeiro, Brazil	
F52	12.82	Antonia Balek	Croatia	13 September 2008	XIII	Beijing, China	
F53	11.69	Esther Rivera	Mexico	13 September 2008	XIII	Beijing, China	
F54	20.25	Flora Ugwunwa	Nigeria	13 September 2016	XV	Rio de Janeiro, Brazil	
F55	23.26	Diana Dadzite	Latvia	10 September 2016	XV	Rio de Janeiro, Brazil	
F56	23.99	Martina Willing	Germany	14 September 2008	XIII	Beijing, China	
F57	Vacant						

=== Club Throw ===
Class	Record	Athlete	Nationality	Date	Games	Place	Ref.
F31	Vacant						
F32	29.00 m	Maroua Ibrahmi	Tunisia	31 August 2024	XVII	Saint-Denis, France	
F51	22.81 m	Joanna Butterfield	Great Britain	11 September 2016	XV	Rio de Janeiro, Brazil	

=== Pentathlon ===
Class	Record	Athlete	Nationality	Date	Games	Place	Ref.
P11	1847	K. Gaedicke	Germany	22 August 1996	X	Atlanta, United States	
P12	2713	Helena Kannus-Slim	Estonia	22 August 1996	X	Atlanta, United States	
P13	3661	Marla Runyan	United States	22 August 1996	X	Atlanta, United States	
P36	Vacant						
P37	Vacant						
P38	Vacant						
P42	Vacant						
P44	Vacant						
P51	Vacant						
P52/53	Vacant						
P54-58	5697	Marianne Buggenhagen	Germany	10 August 1992	IX	Barcelona, Spain	
