= Para athletics classification =

Disability sport classification system

Para athletics classification is a system to determine which athletes with disabilities may compete against each other in Para athletics events. Classification is intended to group together athletes with similar levels of physical ability to allow fair competition. Classification was created and is managed by the International Paralympic Committee (IPC), which is regularly published via its IPC Athletics Classification Handbook. People with physical, vision and intellectual disabilities are eligible to compete in this sport at the Summer Paralympics. The classification for this sport was created during the 1940s and for much of its early history was a medical condition based classification system. The classification system has subsequently become a functional mobility based one, and is moving towards an evidence-based classification system.

Each class has a code consisting of a letter and two digits, with the letter being either "T" or "F" (indicating track or field events) and the number representing the level of physical ability. The current IPC classifications for athletics can be grouped by impairment as follows:

- T/F11–13 (visual impairment)
- T/F20 (intellectual impairment)
- T/F31–34 (wheelchair events for athletes with a movement disorder, including cerebral palsy)
- T/F35–38 (ambulant events for athletes with a movement disorder, including cerebral palsy)
- T/F40–41 (short stature, including dwarfism)
- T/F42–44 (leg impairment, lower limb affected by limb deficiency, leg length difference, impaired muscle power or impaired range of movement)
- T/F45–47 (arm impairment, upper limbs affected by limb deficiency, impaired muscle power or impaired range of movement)
- T/F51–57 (wheelchair events for athletes with a lower body impairment, including paraplegia)
- T/F61-64 (Lower limb/s competing with prosthesis affected by limb deficiency and leg length difference)

== Definition ==
Para athletics classification at the Paralympic Games is the basis for determining who can compete in specific athletic sports, and within which class. It is used for the purposes of establishing fair competition. The general rules for Para athletics are based on rules intended for able-bodied competitors. The blind classifications are based on medical classification, not functional classification.

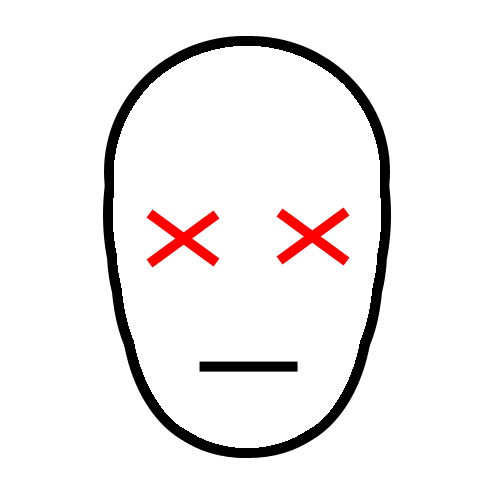
Visualisation of functional vision for a T11 classified competitor

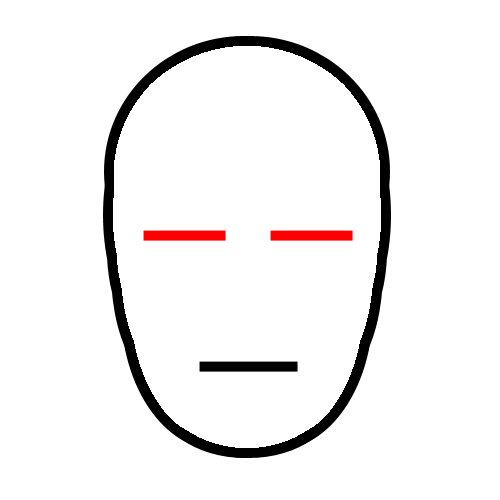
Visualisation of functional vision for a T12 classified competitor

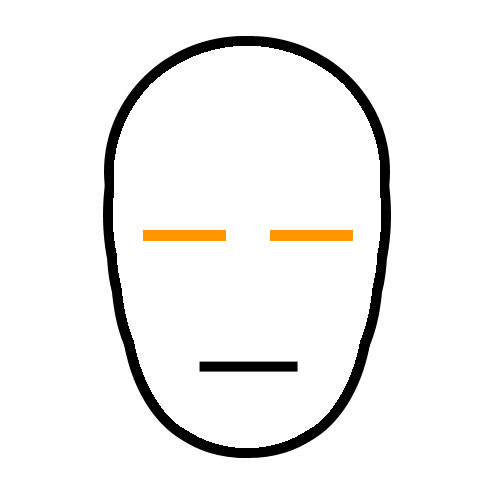
Visualisation of functional vision for a T13 classified competitor

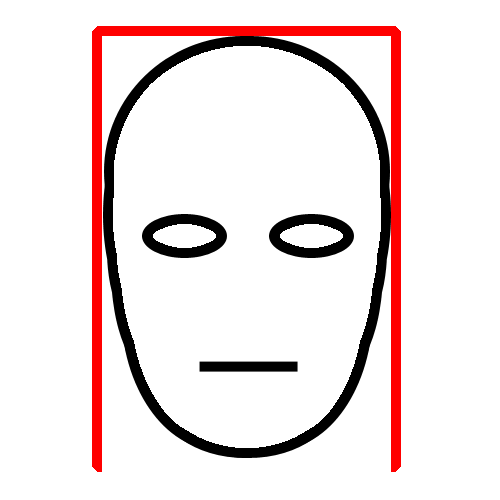
Visualisation of classification for a T20 classified competitor

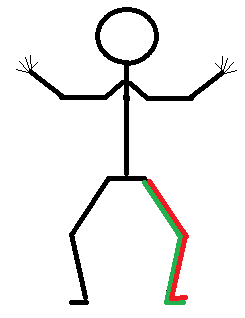
Disability type for some T42 classified competitors

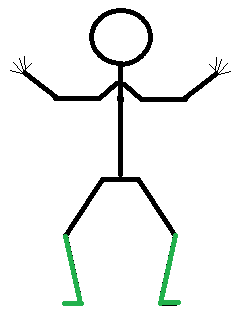
Disability type for some T43 classified competitors

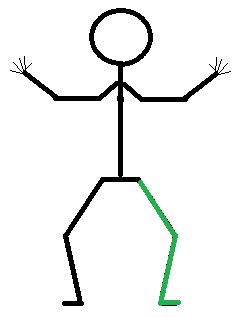
Disability type for some T43 classified competitors

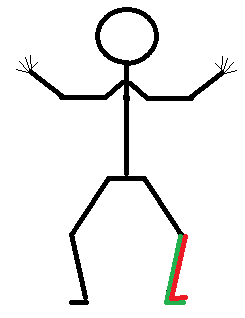
Disability type for some T44 classified competitors

Functional mobility range for a T51 classified competitor

Functional mobility range for a T52 classified competitor

Beyond the level of vision impairment, research done at the Central Institute on Employment Abilities of the Handicapped in Moscow has found differences in functional capabilities based on differences in visual acuity. This plays a significant role in athletics races.

== Governance ==
Classification is handled by the International Paralympic Committee, with classification spelled in the IPC Athletics Classification Handbook. While CP-ISRA has an interest in the sport because it is open to people with cerebral palsy, it is not governed by them. In 1983, the rules for this sport and approval for classification was done by the International Amateur Athletics Federation. At the 1992 Summer Games, athletics classification was governed by four different sporting bodies including the IBSA, ISOD, ISMWSF and the CP-ISRA.

== Eligibility ==
As of 2012, people with physical, vision, and intellectual disabilities are eligible to compete in this sport.

== History ==
The classification for this sport was created during the 1940s and for much of its early history was a medical condition based classification system. An example of classification in this period was L2 SCI, which was for competitors who had normal functioning except for lower limb paralysis. These competitors would not compete in wheelchair races against double above the knee amputees because, while their functional disabilities were similar, their medical conditions were not. The first wheelchair races took place by 1952 at the Stoke Mandeville Hospital. By 1955, Germans had realised there was a need for classification in athletics event because it was systematically unfair to insist a double leg above the knee amputee compete against able bodied athletes in events like the shot put.

In 1964, the International Sport Organization for the Disabled (ISOD) was created. They created the first formal classification system, which had 27 classes. This was reduced to 12 classes for the 1976 Summer Paralympics and was further reduced to nine classes for the 1992 Summer Paralympics. During the late 1960s and early 1970s, the classification system, set up as a series of "handicaps", was seen as problematic because in an effort to clearly describe a disability and promote fairness, the number of classifications made the organisation of competitive events difficult. There were too few people in a classification to the point where an international event for people with disabilities said "1000 competitors = 1000 winners." There were some exceptions to this in classes like double leg paralysis as a result of brain or spinal injury and single leg amputations.

In 1983, classification for cerebral palsy competitors in this sport was done by the Cerebral Palsy International Sports and Recreation Association (CP-ISRA). There were five cerebral palsy classifications. That year, 80 to 85% of all competitors with cerebral palsy competed in the same classification. There was separate classification for track events and field events. Class 2 competitors would compete in the 20 metre race using arm propulsion, 60 metre race using leg propulsion, 200 metre race using leg propulsion and the 3 x 60 metre shuttle relay event, which required 3 competitors from class 2 and 3 of which one had to be a class 2 competitor. In field events, competitors could compete in the medicine ball thrust, the kickball event, the club throw event and the shot put.

In 1983, Cerebral Palsy International Sports and Recreation Association (CP-ISRA) set eligibility rules for classification. They defined cerebral palsy as a non-progressive brain lesion that results in impairment. People with cerebral palsy or non-progressive brain damage were eligible for classification by them. The organisation also dealt with classification for people with similar impairments. For their classification system, people with spina bifida were not eligible unless they had medical evidence of loco-motor dysfunction. People with cerebral palsy and epilepsy were eligible provided the condition did not interfere with their ability to compete. People who had strokes were eligible for classification following medical clearance. Competitors with multiple sclerosis, muscular dystrophy and arthrogryposis were not eligible for classification by CP-ISRA, but were eligible for classification by International Sports Organisation for the Disabled for the Games of Les Autres.

During the 1980s, there were 8 classes for cerebral palsy competitors, 3 classes for competitors with visual impairments, 9 classes for competitors with ambulatory issues and six classes for Les Autres athletes. Intellectual disability athletics classifications existed by the 1984 within the context of the Special Olympics. In some cases, one intellectual disability class existed with events broken down by age in order to allow equal competition for runners. Some of these races were held in Canada and disability classes competed during able bodied events.

Going into the 1992 Summer Paralympics, there was a push to move more towards a functional classification system by the International Coordinating Committee and the Technical Committee of the International Paralympic Committee. This came to a head at the November 1989 meeting of the Barcelona Olympics Organising Committee, when a discussion was started about what events and classifications should be eligible for the Games. A study by the organising committee and the Polytechnic University of Catalonia in the lead up to the meeting. It looked at the results for the 1984 and 1987 Stoke Mandeville Games, the 1984 New York Games, a 1985 Brussels competition, a 1985 Rome competition, a 1986 Puerto Rico competition, a 1987 Paris competition, the 1988 Seoul Games and a 1989 Nottingham competition. The study proposed a series of classes, based on the competitive results, for use in Barcelona. The local organising committee was insistent such a system be implemented to insure the sport at the Paralympic Games was serious and competitive, instead of recreational. The suggestions for classification were then implemented for sports such as swimming and athletics. During the late 1980s and early 1990s there was a movement away from medical classification and into functional classification systems. Following this, the 1992 Summer Paralympics had four wheelchair racing classifications, down from 7 at the 1988 Summer Paralympics.

During the 1990s, there was a decision to try to fix athlete classification so that competitors could have more certainty in which classification they would compete in before attending an event. This was a big change as previously, athletes would be classified right before and during an event.

In 1992, the International Paralympic Committee formally took control of governance for disability sport. The 1992 Games were the first ones where athletes of different types of disabilities competed against each other, athletes had a guaranteed right to appeal their classification. The wheelchair classifications were part of the 1994 Commonwealth Games.

At the 1996 Summer Paralympics, there were 44 athletics classifications, 20 for track and 24 for field. The classifications covered four broad disability types. In 1997, there were four spinal injury related classifications for wheelchair track athletes. They were T1 for tetraplegics, T2 for competitors with partial mobility in their trunk and arms, T3 for competitors who had use of their trunk halfway down and good arms, and T4 for able-bodied athletes from the waist and things, which also included double amputees. A classification system from F1 to F7 existing at the time for wheelchair competitors in field events. A classification system also existed for blind athletes from B1 to B3.

Going into the 2000 Summer Paralympics, there were concerns raised by members of the cerebral palsy community about the need to maintain a multiple functional classification system inside this sport specifically for this class of athletes given the large range of functional ability inside the community with cerebral palsy and other motor functional disabilities. Several classes in this sport were included in the 2002 Commonwealth Games. The new classification system made T1 equivalent to <C6 neurological impairment level and 1A for medical classification, T2 equivalent to CYB neurological impairment level, and 1B and 1C for medical classification, T3 equivalent to C7-T7 neurological impairment level, and 1c, 2 and 3 for medical classification, and T4 equivalent to T8-S2 neurological impairment level and 3, 4, 5 and 6 for medical classification. In 2005, athletics had fifty different races for the 100 metre race when gender and classification events were totaled. These include seven wheelchair classifications, six les autres classes, nine amputee classes, eight cerebral palsy classes, and three blinded classes.

Because of issues in objectively identifying functionality that plagued the post Barcelona Games, the IPC unveiled plans to develop a new classification system in 2003. This classification system went into effect in 2007, and defined ten different disability types that were eligible to participate on the Paralympic level. It required that classification be sport specific, and served two roles. The first was that it determined eligibility to participate in the sport and that it created specific groups of sportspeople who were eligible to participate and in which class. The IPC left it up to International Federations to develop their own classification systems within this framework, with the specification that their classification systems use an evidence based approach developed through research. Functional classifications continued to be used in the 2010s. In 2010, the IPC announced that they would release a new IPC Athletics Classification handbook that specifically dealt with physical impairments. This classification guide would be put into effect following the closing ceremony of the 2012 Summer Paralympics. Athletes needed to be at least 18 years old to compete in the T40/F40 and T41/F41 classes. This was to prevent still growing children from competing in this class despite otherwise not having a disability.

The debate about inclusion of competitors into able-bodied competitions was seen by some disability sport advocates like Horst Strokhkendl as a hindrance to the development of an independent classification system not based on the rules for able-bodied sport.

== Classes ==
There are four classifications for wheelchair athletes with cerebral palsy and similar movement disorders: T31, T32, T33 and T34. There are also four classes for wheelchair athletes with other impairments, such as spinal cord injury. They include T51, T52, T53 and T54. The T54 classification currently in use is comparable to but broader than the early L2 SCI classification. Like L2 SCI, it includes competitors with normal functioning except for lower limb paralysis; unlike SCI L2, it also includes bilateral leg amputees. If a racer's abdominal muscles are paralysed, they may be classified as a T53. Events for wheelchair class athletes range from 100 metre races to the marathon.

In athletics, bilateral below the elbow amputations have a minimal impact on functional ability to run distances. As a result, athletic classifications differ from swimming because of the differences in body use requirements impacting performance.

== Levels of classification ==
There are levels of classification available: Provisional, National and International. The first is for athletes who do not have access to a full classification panel; it is a temporary indication of class, used only in lower levels of competition. The second can be used in all domestic competitions. To compete internationally, an International-level classification is required.

== At the Paralympic Games ==
Wheelchair racing was one of the foundation sports at the original 1960 Summer Paralympics. Only wheelchair classified athletes were eligible to compete at the 1960 Summer Paralympics in Rome in this sport. This continued at the 1964 Summer Paralympics in Tokyo and 1968 Summer Paralympics in Tel Aviv.

As demonstration sports, amputee and visually impaired classifications were allowed to compete in athletics for the first at time at 1972 Summer Paralympics. Competitors with cerebral palsy classifications were allowed to compete at the Paralympics for the first time at the 1984 Summer Paralympics.

At the 1992 Summer Paralympics, all disability types were eligible to participate, with classification being run through all the major classifying bodies, with classification being done based on disability type. General and functional classification took place in the Paralympic Village in block 2 from 29 to 31 August.

At the 1996 Paralympic Games, on the spot classification required sporting equipment available for classifiers to use to assess field competitors' classification. At the 1996 Summer Paralympics, classification was important because if on the spot classifications resulted in changes to a competitor's classification, it impacted the competition schedule. Consequently, on the spot classification or re-classification, was viewed as a negative aspect for these Games and the Paralympic movement overall. At the 2000 Summer Paralympics, 215 assessments were conducted at the Games. This resulted in 30 class changes. 3 of these were protested by a national Paralympic committee and 9 by PNS. 8 of these were upheld and 4 were denied. There were 28 classification appeals lodged for athletics at the 2000 Summer Paralympics involving 18 athletes which resulted in 10 class changes.

For the 2016 Summer Paralympics in Rio, the International Paralympic Committee had a zero classification at the Games policy. This policy was put into place in 2014, with the goal of avoiding last minute changes in classes that would negatively impact athlete training preparations. All competitors needed to be internationally classified with their classification status confirmed prior to the Games, with exceptions to this policy being dealt with on a case-by-case basis. In case there was a need for classification or reclassification at the Games despite best efforts otherwise, athletics classification was scheduled for 4 and 5 September at Olympic Stadium. For sportspeople with physical or intellectual disabilities going through classification or reclassification in Rio, their in competition observation event is their first appearance in competition at the Games.

== Future ==
Disability sport's major classification body, the International Paralympic Committee, is working on improving classification to be more of an evidence-based system as opposed to a performance-based system so as not to punish elite athletes whose performance makes them appear in a higher class alongside competitors who train less.

== See also ==
- Disability sport classification
