= T43 (classification) =

Para-athletics classification

T43 is a disability sport classification for disability athletics (track and jump events only), applying to athletes with "Double below knee amputation (or combined arm/leg amputation) or similar disability." It includes ISOD classified athletes from the A4 and A9 classes.

== Definition ==
This classification is for disability athletics in the track and jump events. This classification is one of several classifications for athletes with ambulant related disabilities. Similar classifications are T40, T42, T44, T45 and T46. The International Paralympic Committee defined this class in 2011 as: "Double below knee amputees and other athletes with impairments that are comparable to a double below knee amputation." This includes athletes with loss of muscle power in the lower limbs consistent with Class F57 or F58." The International Paralympic Committee defined this classification on their website in July 2016 as, "Lower limb affected by limb deficiency, leg length difference, impaired muscle power or impaired range of movement".

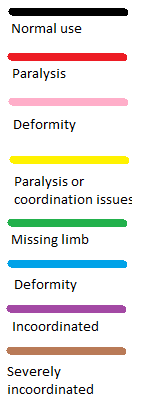
Colour guide for understanding full body diagrams

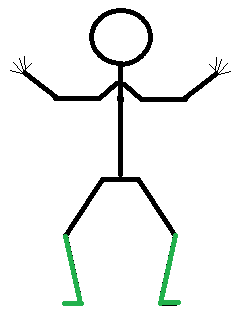
Disability type for some T43 classified competitors

== Disability groups ==
=== Amputees ===
People who are amputees compete in this class, including ISOD A9.

==== Lower limb amputees ====
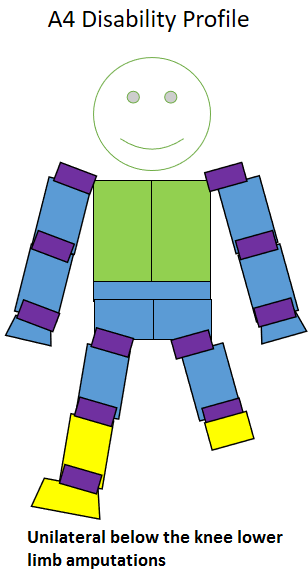
Type of amputation for an A4 classified sportsperson.

This class competes in T44. Shank length for people in this class is not uniform, with competitors having different lengths of leg found below their knee. People in this class use a prosthetic limb when competing in athletics. It has three parts: a socket, a shank and a foot. People in this class can use standard starting blocks because their amputation generally allows for the use of a standard starting position. Use of a specially made carbon fibre running prosthetic leg assists runners in this class in lowering their heart rate compared to using a prosthetic not designed for running. Runners in this class can have lower metabolic costs compared to elite runners over middle and long distances.

Inside the class, shank length does not impact the distance that male long jumpers can jump. A study was done comparing the performance of athletics competitors at the 1984 Summer Paralympics. It found there was no significant difference in performance in times between women in A2, A3 and A4 in the long jump, men in A2, A3 and A4 in the high jump, men in A4, A5 and A6 in the high jump, and men in A1, A2, A3 and A4 in the 400 meter race.

Historically, because of low participation rates in men's T43 races, the class has been combined with the T44 class. The combined class was then called T44 and included both single and double below the knee amputees. There was a push in 2008 to avoid this happening because of a perception that double below knee amputees had a competitive advantage compared to single below knee amputees. Subsequent research related to results for men at the 2012 Summer Paralympics in London confirmed this to be the case for both the 200 meters and 400 meters.

The nature of a person's amputations in this class can affect their physiology and sports performance. People in this class use around 7% more oxygen to walk or run the same distance as someone without a lower limb amputation.

==== Upper and lower limb amputees ====
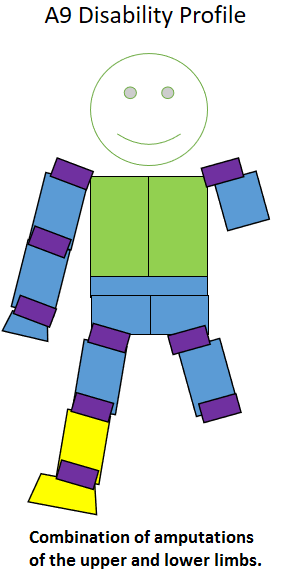
Type of amputation for an A9 classified sportsperson.

Members of the ISOD A9 class compete in T42, T43, T44, F42, F43, F44, F56, F57, and F58. The shank length of people in this class can differ dramatically, and is not uniform across the class.

The nature of an A9 athlete's amputations can affect their physiology and sports performance. Common problems with intact upper limbs for people in this class include rotator cuffs tearing, shoulder impingement, epicondylitis and peripheral nerve entrapment.

== Performance and rules ==
People in this class are not required to use a starting block. They have an option to start from a standing position, a crouch or a 3-point stance. In relay events involving T40s classes, no baton is used. Instead, a handoff takes place via touch in the exchange zone. People in this class who are lower limb amputees are required to wear their leg prosthesis when they are on the track, and they must run. They cannot hop. People with arm amputations in this class can have elevated padded blocks to place their stumps on for the start of the race. These blocks need to be in a neutral color or a color similar to that of the track, and they must be placed entirely behind the starting line. Their location needs to be such that they do not interfere with the start of any other athlete.

In field events for this class, athletes are not required to wear a prosthetic. In jumping events, athletes have 60 seconds during which they must complete their jump. During this time, they can adjust their prosthetic.

If during a jump the athlete's prosthesis falls off and lands closer to the takeoff board than the athlete, the mark is taken where the prosthesis landed. If prosthesis falls off outside the landing zone nearer the board than where athlete landed, the jump counts as a foul.

== Events ==
There are a number of different events open to people in this class internationally. Many competitions have their own minimum qualifying standards.

gender	Event	Class	AQS/MQS	BQS	Event
men's	100m	T43/44	10.95	11.3	2016 Summer Paralympics
women's	100m	T43/44	13.24	13.53	2016 Summer Paralympics
men's	200m	T43/44	22.1	22.52	2016 Summer Paralympics
women's	200m	T43/44	28.36	29.28	2016 Summer Paralympics
men's	400m	T43/44	49.28	53.32	2016 Summer Paralympics
women's	400m	T43/44	62	01:10.0	2016 Summer Paralympics

== History ==
The classification was created by the International Paralympic Committee and has roots in a 2003 attempt to address "the overall objective to support and co-ordinate the ongoing development of accurate, reliable, consistent and credible sport focused classification systems and their implementation."

For the 2016 Summer Paralympics in Rio, the International Paralympic Committee had a zero classification at the Games policy. This policy was put into place in 2014, with the goal of avoiding last minute changes in classes that would negatively impact athlete training preparations. All competitors needed to be internationally classified with their classification status confirmed prior to the Games, with exceptions to this policy being dealt with on a case-by-case basis. In case there was a need for classification or reclassification at the Games despite best efforts otherwise, athletics classification was scheduled for September 4 and September 5 at Olympic Stadium. For sportspeople with physical or intellectual disabilities going through classification or reclassification in Rio, their in competition observation event is their first appearance in competition at the Games.

== Becoming classified ==
For this class, classification generally has four phases. The first stage of classification is a health examination. For amputees in this class, this is often done on site at a sports training facility or competition. The second stage is observation in practice, the third stage is observation in competition, and the last stage is assigning the sportsperson to a relevant class. During the observation phase involving training or practice, all athletes in this class may be asked to demonstrate their skills in athletics, such as running or jumping. A determination is then made as to what classification an athlete should compete in. Classifications may be Confirmed or Review status. For athletes who do not have access to a full classification panel, Provisional classification is available; this is a temporary Review classification, considered an indication of class only, and generally used only in lower levels of competition.

For people in this class with amputations, classification is often based on the anatomical nature of the amputation. The classification system takes several things into account when putting people into this class; these include which limbs are affected, how many limbs are affected, and how much of a limb is missing.

== Competitors ==
He took issue with the fact that during the Athens Paralympics I competed against the T44 athletes but, as I have stated, I made this choice precisely because there were no T43 athletes with qualifying times anywhere close to mine.

— Oscar Pistorius

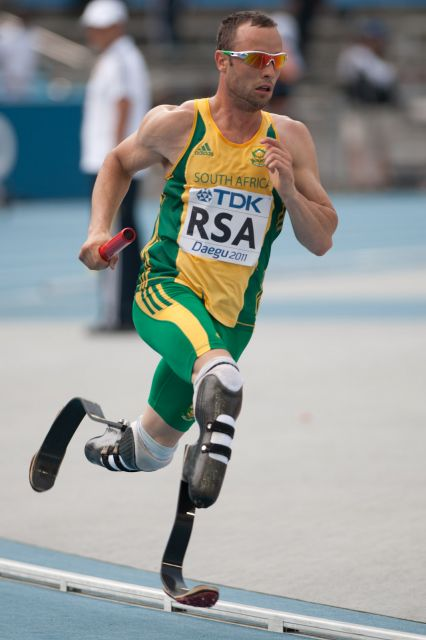
Oscar Pistorius at the 2011 World Championships Athletics in Daegu

Oscar Pistorius is the men's world record holder for T43 in the 400 metres event. With a 400 metres time of 45.07 seconds recorded on 19 July 2011, he achieved the "A" qualifying requirement for the 2011 World Championships and the 2012 Summer Olympics. In London 2012, Pistorius became the first amputee to run at the Summer Olympic Games.

In the 2012 London Paralympics, Pistorius set a new world record in the first-round heats of the 200 metres T43/T44 event, finishing with a time of 21.30s. However, he was defeated in the final by Brazilian runner Alan Oliveira with a time of 21.45. Alan Oliveira currently holds the 100m T44 world record after winning the Paralympic Anniversary Games in London with a time of 10.57.
