= T42 (classification) =

Para-athletics classification

T42 and F42 are disability sport classifications for disability athletics (track and jump events only), applying to athletes with single above the knee amputations or a disability that is comparable. This class includes ISOD classified A2 and A9 competitors.

== Definition ==
This classification is for disability athletics competing in track and jump events. This classification is one of several classifications for athletes with ambulant related disabilities. Similar classifications are T43, T44, T45 and T46. The International Paralympic Committee defined this class in 2011 as: "Single above knee amputees and athletes with other impairments that are comparable to a single above knee amputation. This includes athletes with loss of muscle power in the lower limbs consistent with Class F57 or F58 class." The International Paralympic Committee defined the T42 to T44 classifications on their website in July 2016 as, "Lower limb affected by limb deficiency, leg length difference, impaired muscle power or impaired range of movement".

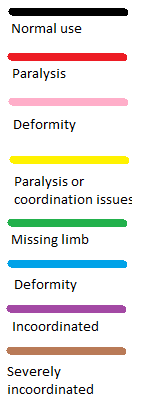
Colour guide for understanding full body diagrams

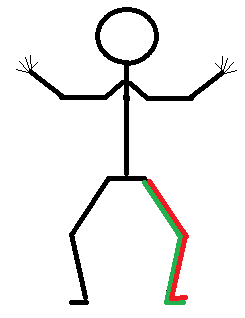
Disability type for some T42 classified competitors

== Disability groups ==
=== Amputees ===
People who are amputees compete in this class, including ISOD A2 and A9.

==== Lower limb amputees ====
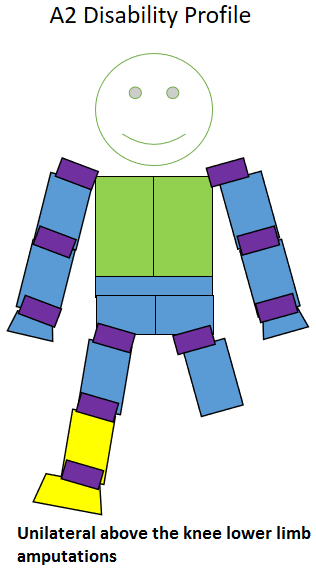
Type of amputation for an A2 classified sportsperson.

This class includes ISOD A2 classified athletes. People in this class use a prosthetic limb when competing in athletics. It has four parts: a socket, a knee, a shank and a foot. Above the knee amputees have difficulty using standard able-bodied splint actions because of the differences in their functional muscle mass. As a result, they often use a specialized sprinting technique called “Leg-Over-Leg”. This technique involves using hip extensions to avoid deceleration caused by the prosthetic leg hitting the ground. Use of a specially made carbon fibre running prosthetic leg assists runners in this class in lowering their heart rate compared to using a prosthetic not designed for running. Runners in this class can have lower metabolic costs compared to elite runners over middle and long distances.

A study was done comparing the performance of athletics competitors at the 1984 Summer Paralympics. It found there was no significant difference in performance in times between women in A1, A2 and A3 in the 100 meter race, men in A1, A2 and A3 in the 100 meter race, and men in A1, A2, A3 and A4 in the 400 meter race.

==== Upper and lower limb amputees ====
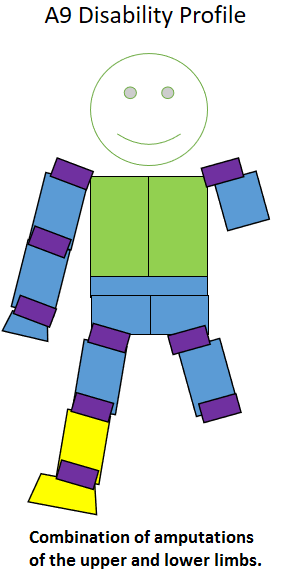
Type of amputation for an A9 classified sportsperson.

Members of the ISOD A9 class compete in T42, T43, T44, F42, F43, F44, F56, F57, and F58. The shank length of people in this class can differ dramatically, and is not uniform across the class.

The nature of an A9 athlete's amputations can effect their physiology and sports performance. Because they are missing a limb, amputees are more prone to overuse injuries in their remaining limbs. Common problems with intact upper limbs for people in this class include rotator cuffs tearing, shoulder impingement, epicondylitis and peripheral nerve entrapment.

== Performance and rules ==
In relay events involving T40s classes, no baton is used. Instead, a hand off takes place via touch in the exchange zone. People in this class who are lower limb amputees are required to wear their leg prosthesis when they are on the track, and they must run. They cannot hop.

People with arm amputations in this class can have elevated padded blocks to place their stumps on for the start of the race. These blocks need to be in a neutral color or a color similar to that of the track, and they must be placed entirely behind the starting line. Their location needs to be such that they do not interfere with the start of any other athlete.

In throwing events, implement weights are as follows:

Event	Male	Female
Shot put	6.00 kg (13.23 lb)	4.00 kg (8.82 lb)
Discus throw	1.50 kg (3.3 lb)	1.00 kg (2.20 lb)
Javelin throw	800 g (28 oz)	600 g (21 oz)

== Events ==
There are a number of different events open to people in this class internationally. Many competitions have their own minimum qualifying standards.

Gender	Event	Class	AQS/MQS	BQS	Event
Men's	100m	T42	12.48	12.61	2016 Summer Paralympics
Women's	100m	T42	16.23	17.62	2016 Summer Paralympics
Men's	200m	T42	25.14	25.98	2016 Summer Paralympics
Men's	high jump	T42	1.78	1.73	2016 Summer Paralympics
Men's	long jump	T42	6.07	5.57	2016 Summer Paralympics
Women's	long jump	T42	3.88	3.66	2016 Summer Paralympics

== History ==
The classification was created by the International Paralympic Committee and has roots in a 2003 attempt to address "the overall objective to support and co-ordinate the ongoing development of accurate, reliable, consistent and credible sport focused classification systems and their implementation."

== Becoming classified ==
T42 competitor Scott Reardon turns around on the track at AIS

For this class, classification generally has four phases. The first stage of classification is a health examination. For amputees in this class, this is often done on site at a sports training facility or competition. The second stage is observation in practice, the third stage is observation in competition and the last stage is assigning the sportsperson to a relevant class. During the observation phase involving training or practice, all athletes in this class may be asked to demonstrate their skills in athletics, such as running or jumping. A determination is then made as to what classification an athlete should compete in. Classifications may be Confirmed or Review status. For athletes who do not have access to a full classification panel, Provisional classification is available; this is a temporary Review classification, considered an indication of class only, and generally used only in lower levels of competition.

== Competitors ==
Notable current competitors in this class include Kelly Cartwright, Scott Reardon, Heinrich Popow, Earle Connor, Wojtek Czyz and Martina Caironi. Double above knee amputees Vanessa Low and Richard Whitehead also compete in the T42 classification, both achieved T42 world records and won T42 Paralympic Gold medals.
