= T61-64 (classification) =

Para-athletics classification

T61-64 are disability sport classifications for para athletics in the track and jump events at the Paralympic Games. It includes athletes either limb deficiency (from congenital limb difference or traumatic or surgical amputation) or leg length discrepancy of seven or more inches.
