= T40 (classification) =

Para-athletics classification

T40 is disability sport classification for disability athletics, specifically athletes of short stature. Male athletes under 130 cm (4 ft 3 1/4 in) and female athletes under 125 cm (4 ft 1 1/4 in) can compete in this category.

== Sport ==
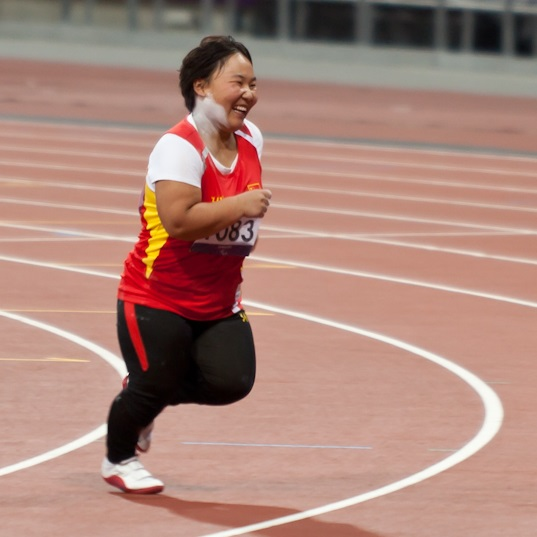
Genjimisu Meng, a T40 Chinese athlete, at the 2012 Summer Paralympics

This classification is for disability athletics. Jane Buckley, writing for the Sporting Wheelies, describes the athletes in this classification as: "Dwarf class - achondroplasia or similar J18 years old max height: 145cm (male) 140cm (female)." The Australian Paralympic Committee defines this classification as being for athletes who have the "People with dwarfism due to achondroplasia or a variant of this."

A 2012 International Paralympic Committee Athletics Classification Project report proposed splitting the current T40 classification, with more restrictive T40 eligibility criteria (for shorter or more disproportionate athletes) and a new T41 classification (for athletes at the minimum disability end of the current class). This proposal was ratified in 2013 with the maximum height of T40 athletes <130 cm (male) and <125 cm (female). The International Paralympic Committee defined this classification on their website in July 2016 as, " (Short stature)".

== Performance and rules ==
There are no relay events involving F40 or F41 classes in Paralympic Athletics. Only the Shot, Discus and Javelin is available for these classes as referenced in World Para Athletics Handbook page 265. Also to note that the letter T is for Track and the letter F used for field.

== History ==
The classification was created by the International Paralympic Committee and has roots in a 2003 attempt to address "the overall objective to support and co-ordinate the ongoing development of accurate, reliable, consistent and credible sport focused classification systems and their implementation."

In 2010, the IPC announced that they would release a new IPC Athletics Classification handbook that specifically dealt with physical impairments. This classification guide would be put into effect following the closing ceremony of the 2012 Summer Paralympics. One of these changes was creating a minimum age to compete in this class. Athletes needed to be at least 18 years old to compete. This was to prevent still growing children from competing in this class despite otherwise not having a disability.

For the 2016 Summer Paralympics in Rio, the International Paralympic Committee had a zero classification at the Games policy. This policy was put into place in 2014, with the goal of avoiding last minute changes in classes that would negatively impact athlete training preparations. All competitors needed to be internationally classified with their classification status confirmed prior to the Games, with exceptions to this policy being dealt with on a case-by-case basis. In case there was a need for classification or reclassification at the Games despite best efforts otherwise, athletics classification was scheduled for September 4 and September 5 at Olympic Stadium. For sportspeople with physical or intellectual disabilities going through classification or reclassification in Rio, their in competition observation event is their first appearance in competition at the Games.

== Becoming classified ==
Short-statured athletes seeking to compete in this class first need to have a classification evaluation. During this, they undergo a medical examination where their height and limbs are measured, and are asked to demonstrate skills in athletics such as running and throwing. A determination is then made as to what classification an athlete should compete in.

== Competitors ==
Athletics competitors in this class include Nathan Nass, Candice Schmidt and Kate Wilson.

In the United Kingdom Amy Thompson (F41) is the British Record Holder for Shot and Discus. In the Shot Put she is 3m ahead of the next athlete in this class. In the Discus she is 11m ahead.

== See also ==
- Para-athletics classification
- Athletics at the Summer Paralympics
