= Athletics at the 2016 Summer Paralympics – Men's 100 metres T51 =

Men's 100 metres T51 at the XV Paralympic Games
- Venue: Estádio Olímpico João Havelange
- Dates: 13 September 2016
- Competitors: 7 from 7 nations

Medalists
1st place, gold medalist(s)		Peter Genyn	Belgium
2nd place, silver medalist(s)		Mohamed Berrahal	Algeria
3rd place, bronze medalist(s)		Edgar Cesareo Navarro Sanchez	Mexico

The T51 category is for wheelchair athletes having spinal cord injuries, with mild weakness in shoulders, limited ability in straightening elbows and wrist function, and no finger, trunk or leg function.

The Athletics at the 2016 Summer Paralympics – Men's 100 metres T51 event at the 2016 Paralympic Games took place on 13 September 2016, at the Estádio Olímpico João Havelange.

== Final ==
10:36 13 September 2016:

Rank	Lane	Bib	Name	Nationality	Reaction	Time	Notes
1st place, gold medalist(s)	4	1101	Peter Genyn	Belgium		21.15	
2nd place, silver medalist(s)	3	1011	Mohamed Berrahal	Algeria		21.70	
3rd place, bronze medalist(s)	6	1879	Edgar Cesareo Navarro Sanchez	Mexico		21.96	
4	8	1458	Toni Piispanen	Finland		22.02	
5	2	1706	Alvise de Vidi	Italy		22.73	
6	5	1515	Stephen Osborne	Great Britain		23.18	
7	7	2050	Helder Mestre	Portugal		24.35	
