= 2023 World Para Athletics Championships – Men's 100 metres =

The men's 100 metres at the 2023 World Para Athletics Championships were held in the Charlety Stadium, Paris, France, from 9 to 17 July.

== Medalists ==
| Event | Gold | Silver | Bronze |
|---|---|---|---|
| T11 | Athanasios Ghavelas; Greece | Ananias Shikongo; Namibia | Timothée Adolphe; France |
| T12 | Noah Malone; United States | Mouncef Bouja; Morocco | Zac Shaw; Great Britain |
| T13 | Salum Ageze Kashafali; Norway | Fabrício Barros; Brazil | Jakkarin Dammunee; Thailand |
| T34 | Chaiwat Rattana; Thailand | Austin Smeenk; Canada | Walid Ktila; Tunisia |
| T35 | Ihor Tsvietov; Ukraine | Ivan Tetiukhin; Ukraine | Fabio Bordignon; Brazil |
| T36 | James Turner; Australia | Mokhtar Didane; Algeria | Alexis Sebastian Chavez; Argentina |
| T37 | Ricardo Gomes de Mendonça; Brazil | Saptoyoga Purnomo; Indonesia | Christian Gabriel Luiz; Brazil |
| T38 | Jaydin Blackwell; United States | Zhu Dening; China | Nick Mayhugh; United States |
| T44 | Mpumelelo Mhlongo; South Africa | Karim Ramadan; Egypt | Matheus de Lima; Brazil |
| T47 | Petrúcio Ferreira; Brazil | José Martins; Brazil | Kevin Santos; Great Britain |
| T51 | Peter Genyn; Belgium | Roger Habsch; Belgium | Toni Piispanen; Finland |
| T52 | Maxime Carabin; Belgium | Fabian Blum; Switzerland | Leonardo Pérez; Mexico |
| T53 | Pongsakorn Paeyo; Thailand | Adbulrahman Alqurashi; Saudi Arabia | Ariosvaldo Fernandes; Brazil |
| T54 | Athiwat Paeng-Nuea; Thailand | Leo-Pekka Tähti; Finland | Hu Yang; China |
| T63 | Joel de Jong; Netherlands | Vinicius Goncalves; Brazil | Leon Schaefer; Germany |
| T64 | Maxcel Amo Manu; Italy | Sherman Guity; Costa Rica | Felix Streng; Germany |
| T72 | Gavin Drysdale; Great Britain | Rafi Solaiman; Great Britain | Vinicius Marques; Brazil |

== T11 ==
The event took place on 15 July.

| Rank | Lane | Name | Nationality | Time | Notes |
|---|---|---|---|---|---|
| 1st place, gold medalist(s) | 3 | Athanasios Ghavelas | Greece | 10.93 | =CR |
| 2nd place, silver medalist(s) | 1 | Ananias Shikongo | Namibia | 11.11 | =AR |
| 3rd place, bronze medalist(s) | 5 | Timothée Adolphe | France | 11.12 | SB |
| 4 | 7 | Gerard Descarrega | Spain | 11.13 | PB |

== T12 ==
The event took place on 10 July.

| Rank | Lane | Name | Nationality | Time | Notes |
|---|---|---|---|---|---|
| 1st place, gold medalist(s) | 5 | Noah Malone | United States | 10.53 | CR |
| 2nd place, silver medalist(s) | 3 | Mouncef Bouja | Morocco | 10.84 | PB |
| 3rd place, bronze medalist(s) | 7 | Zac Shaw | Great Britain | 10.85 | PB |
| 4 | 1 | Jaco Smit | South Africa | 11.08 | PB |

== T13 ==
The event took place on 12 July.

| Rank | Lane | Name | Nationality | Time | Notes |
|---|---|---|---|---|---|
| 1st place, gold medalist(s) | 5 | Salum Ageze Kashafali | Norway | 10.45 | CR |
| 2nd place, silver medalist(s) | 6 | Fabricio Barros | Brazil | 10.82 | |
| 3rd place, bronze medalist(s) | 8 | Jakkarin Dammunee | Thailand | 10.86 | AR |
| 4 | 3 | Chad Perris | Australia | 10.87 | |
| 5 | 7 | Axel Zorzi | France | 10.99 | |
| 6 | 1 | Johannes Nambala | Namibia | 11.05 | SB |
| 7 | 2 | Vegard Dragsund Sverd | Norway | 11.23 | |
| | 4 | Skander Athmani | Algeria | | DNS |

== T34 ==
The event took place on 13 July.

| Rank | Lane | Name | Nationality | Time | Notes |
|---|---|---|---|---|---|
| 1st place, gold medalist(s) | 4 | Chaiwat Rattana | Thailand | 15.01 | AR |
| 2nd place, silver medalist(s) | 6 | Austin Smeenk | Canada | 15.1 | |
| 3rd place, bronze medalist(s) | 5 | Walid Ktila | Tunisia | 15.11 | |
| 4 | 1 | Roberto Michel | Mauritius | 15.28 | |
| 5 | 7 | Yang Wang | China | 15.44 | PB |
| 6 | 8 | Wenhao Gong | China | 15.46 | |
| 7 | 3 | Henry Manni | Finland | 15.47 | |
| 8 | 2 | Rheed Mccracken | Australia | 15.75 | |

== T35 ==
The event took place on 16 July.

| Rank | Lane | Name | Nationality | Time | Notes |
|---|---|---|---|---|---|
| 1st place, gold medalist(s) | 3 | Ihor Tsvietov | Ukraine | 11.78 | SB |
| 2nd place, silver medalist(s) | 6 | Ivan Tetiukhin | Ukraine | 12.50 | |
| 3rd place, bronze medalist(s) | 8 | Fabio Bordignon | Brazil | 12.59 | |
| 4 | 5 | Hernan Barreto | Argentina | 12.73 | |
| 5 | 4 | Kyle Keyworth | Great Britain | 12.75 | PB |
| 6 | 7 | Marshall Zackery | United States | 13.30 | |
| 7 | 2 | Diego Martin Gonzalez | Argentina | 13.30 | |
| 8 | 1 | Matthew Paintin | United States | 13.75 | |

== T36 ==
The event took place on 15 July.

| Rank | Lane | Name | Nationality | Time | Notes |
|---|---|---|---|---|---|
| 1st place, gold medalist(s) | 4 | James Turner | Australia | 11.85 | |
| 2nd place, silver medalist(s) | 3 | Mokhtar Didane | Algeria | 11.99 | AR |
| 3rd place, bronze medalist(s) | 5 | Alexis Sebastian Chavez | Argentina | 12.03 | SB |
| 4 | 8 | Deng Peicheng | China | 12.06 | |
| 5 | 7 | Mohamad Ridzuan Mohamad Puzi | Malaysia | 12.24 | SB |
| 6 | 6 | Izzat Turgunov | Uzbekistan | 12.38 | PB |
| 7 | 1 | Rodrigo Parreira da Silva | Brazil | 12.58 | SB |
| 8 | 2 | Roman Pavlyk | Ukraine | 13.01 | SB |

== T37 ==
The event took place on 10 July.

| Rank | Lane | Name | Nationality | Time | Notes |
|---|---|---|---|---|---|
| 1st place, gold medalist(s) | 6 | Ricardo Gomes | Brazil | 11.21 | CR |
| 2nd place, silver medalist(s) | 4 | Saptoyoga Purnomo | Indonesia | 11.27 | AR |
| 3rd place, bronze medalist(s) | 3 | Christian Gabriel Luiz | Brazil | 11.38 | SB |
| 4 | 8 | Vladyslav Zahrebelnyi | Ukraine | 11.94 | |
| 5 | 5 | Michal Kotkowski | Poland | 12.01 | |
| 6 | 1 | Shreyansh Trivedi | India | 12.03 | PB |
| 7 | 2 | Mykola Raiskyi | Ukraine | 12.08 | PB |
| 8 | 7 | Joseph Smith | New Zealand | 12.10 | |

== T38 ==
The event took place on 10 July.

| Rank | Lane | Name | Nationality | Time | Notes |
|---|---|---|---|---|---|
| 1st place, gold medalist(s) | 6 | Jaydin Blackwell | United States | 10.92 | CR |
| 2nd place, silver medalist(s) | 3 | Zhu Dening | China | 11.00 | SB |
| 3rd place, bronze medalist(s) | 4 | Nick Mayhugh | United States | 11.14 | |
| 4 | 5 | Santiago Solís | Colombia | 11.19 | PB |
| 5 | 1 | Dimitri Jozwicki | France | 11.19 | |
| 6 | 2 | Ryan Medrano | United States | 11.32 | |
| 7 | 8 | Thomas Young | Great Britain | 11.35 | |
| 8 | 7 | Evan O'Hanlon | Australia | 11.41 | |

== T44 ==
The event took place on 12 July.

| Rank | Lane | Name | Nationality | Time | Notes |
|---|---|---|---|---|---|
| 1st place, gold medalist(s) | 4 | Mpumelelo Mhlongo | South Africa | 11.46 | SB |
| 2nd place, silver medalist(s) | 5 | Karim Ramadan | Egypt | 11.79 | PB |
| 3rd place, bronze medalist(s) | 3 | Matheus de Lima | Brazil | 12.05 | |
| 4 | 6 | Marco Cicchetti | Italy | 12.39 | |
| 5 | 8 | Denzel Namene | Namibia | 12.42 | |
| 6 | 1 | Vijay Kumar | India | 12.59 | |
| 7 | 7 | Manoj Baskar | India | 12.67 | |
| | 2 | Nour Alsana | Saudi Arabia | | DQ |

== T47 ==
The event took place on 17 July.

| Rank | Lane | Name | Nationality | Class | Time | Notes |
|---|---|---|---|---|---|---|
| 1st place, gold medalist(s) | 5 | Petrucio Ferreira | Brazil | T47 | 10.37 | CR |
| 2nd place, silver medalist(s) | 3 | Jose Martins | Brazil | T47 | 10.73 | PB |
| 3rd place, bronze medalist(s) | 4 | Kevin Santos | Great Britain | T47 | 10.85 | |
| 4 | 6 | Washington Junior | Brazil | T47 | 10.88 | |
| 5 | 8 | Jaydon Page | Australia | T47 | 10.9 | AR |
| 6 | 2 | Kakeru Ishida | Japan | T46 | 11.1 | |
| 7 | 7 | E Oyinbo-Coker | Great Britain | T47 | 11.2 | |
| 8 | 1 | Michal Derus | Poland | T47 | 12.23 | |

== T51 ==
The event took place on 16 July.

| Rank | Lane | Name | Nationality | Time | Notes |
|---|---|---|---|---|---|
| 1st place, gold medalist(s) | 6 | Peter Genyn | Belgium | 19.79 | CR |
| 2nd place, silver medalist(s) | 4 | Roger Habsch | Belgium | 19.97 | |
| 3rd place, bronze medalist(s) | 3 | Toni Piispanen | Finland | 20.56 | |
| 4 | 7 | Mohamed Berrahal | Algeria | 22.56 | |
| 5 | 5 | Cody Fournie | Canada | 22.94 | |
| 6 | 8 | Edgar Navarro | Mexico | 22.95 | |
| 7 | 2 | Ernesto Fonseca | Costa Rica | 23.91 | |
| 8 | 1 | Pieter du Preez | South Africa | 24.23 | |

== T52 ==
| Rank | Lane | Name | Nationality | Class | Time |
|---|---|---|---|---|---|
| 1st place, gold medalist(s) | 3 | Maxime Carabin | Belgium | T52 | 16.90 |
| 2nd place, silver medalist(s) | 6 | Fabian Blum | Switzerland | T52 | 17.98 |
| 3rd place, bronze medalist(s) | 1 | De Jesus Leonardo | Mexico | T52 | 18.02 |
| 4 | 5 | Sam Mcintosh | Australia | T52 | 18.18 |
| 5 | 8 | Cristian Torres | Colombia | T52 | 18.21 |
| 6 | 4 | Ito Tatsuya | Japan | T52 | 18.36 |
| 7 | 7 | Daley Marcus Perrineau | Great Britain | T52 | 18.40 |
| 8 | 2 | Anthony Bouchard | Canada | T52 | 18.89 |

== T53 ==
The event took place on 12 July.

| Rank | Lane | Name | Nationality | Time | Notes |
|---|---|---|---|---|---|
| 1st place, gold medalist(s) | 5 | Pongsakorn Paeyo | Thailand | 14.51 | SB |
| 2nd place, silver medalist(s) | 6 | Adbulrahman Alqurashi | Saudi Arabia | 14.84 | |
| 3rd place, bronze medalist(s) | 3 | Ariosvaldo Fernandes | Brazil | 14.91 | |
| 4 | 4 | Brian Siemann | United States | 15.05 | SB |
| 5 | 7 | Pichet Krungget | Thailand | 15.07 | PB |
| 6 | 8 | Pierre Fairbank | France | 15.28 | |
| 7 | 1 | Byunghoon Yoo | South Korea | 15.44 | |
| 8 | 2 | Kyung Chan Yoon | South Korea | 15.49 | SB |

== T54 ==
The event took place on 15 July.

| Rank | Lane | Name | Nationality | Class | Time |
|---|---|---|---|---|---|
| 1st place, gold medalist(s) | 4 | Athiwat Paeng-Nuea | Thailand | T54 | 13.64 |
| 2nd place, silver medalist(s) | 5 | Tahti Leo-Pekka | Finland | T54 | 13.77 |
| 3rd place, bronze medalist(s) | 3 | Yang Hu | China | T54 | 13.84 |
| 4 | 7 | Zhang Ying | China | T54 | 14.06 |
| 5 | 1 | Samuel Carter | Australia | T54 | 14.21 |
| 6 | 8 | Tomoki Ikoma | Japan | T54 | 14.23 |
| 7 | 6 | Jamaan Alzahrani | Saudi Arabia | T54 | 14.52 |
| 8 | 2 | Esa-Pekka Mattila | Finland | T54 | 14.57 |

== T63 ==
The event took place on 17 July.

| Rank | Lane | Name | Nationality | Class | Time | Notes |
|---|---|---|---|---|---|---|
| 1st place, gold medalist(s) | 6 | Joel de Jong | Netherlands | T63 | 12.09 | CR |
| 2nd place, silver medalist(s) | 5 | Vinícius Rodrigues | Brazil | T63 | 12.16 | SB |
| 3rd place, bronze medalist(s) | 4 | Leon Schaefer | Germany | T63 | 12.18 | PB |
| 4 | 3 | Daniel Wagner | Denmark | T63 | 12.26 | (.252) PB |
| 5 | 2 | Michael Mabote | South Africa | T63 | 12.26 | (.256) AR |
| 6 | 7 | Ezra Frech | United States | T63 | 12.45 | PB |
| 7 | 8 | Alessandro Ossola | Italy | T63 | 12.68 | SB |
| 8 | 1 | Ilias Benkaddour | Belgium | T63 | 14.69 | |

== T64 ==
The event took place on 12 July.

| Rank | Lane | Name | Nationality | Class | Time | Notes |
|---|---|---|---|---|---|---|
| 1st place, gold medalist(s) | 6 | Maxcel Amo Manu | Italy | T64 | 10.71 | 17.5 (b) |
| 2nd place, silver medalist(s) | 4 | Sherman Guity | Costa Rica | T64 | 10.79 | |
| 3rd place, bronze medalist(s) | 5 | Felix Streng | Germany | T64 | 10.85 | |
| 4 | 3 | Johannes Floors | Germany | T62 | 10.94 | |
| 5 | 8 | Jonnie Peacock | Great Britain | T64 | 10.98 | |
| 6 | 7 | Olivier Hendriks | Netherlands | T62 | 11.26 | |
| 7 | 2 | Hunter Woodhall | United States | T62 | 11.46 | |
| 8 | 1 | Blake Leeper | United States | T62 | 11.46 | |

== T72 ==
The event took place on 9 July.

| Rank | Lane | Name | Nationality | Class | Time |
|---|---|---|---|---|---|
| 1st place, gold medalist(s) | 5 | Gavin Drysdale | Great Britain | T72 | 16.66 |
| 2nd place, silver medalist(s) | 3 | Rafi Solaiman | Great Britain | T72 | 16.78 |
| 3rd place, bronze medalist(s) | 2 | Vinicius Marques | Brazil | T72 | 17.60 |
| 4 | 6 | Deividas Podobajevas | Lithuania | T72 | 17.62 |
| 5 | 4 | Arturas Plodunovas | Lithuania | T72 | 18.83 |
| 6 | 8 | Lasse Kromann | Denmark | T72 | 18.86 |
| 7 | 1 | Michael Anwar | United States | T72 | 19.72 |
| 8 | 7 | Axel Colling | Sweden | T72 | 20.98 |
