= Athletics at the 2016 Summer Paralympics – Men's 400 metres T51 =

Men's 400 metres T51 at the XV Paralympic Games
- Venue: Estádio Olímpico João Havelange
- Dates: 17 September 2016
- Competitors: 7 from 7 nations

Medalists
| 1st place, gold medalist(s) | | Peter Genyn | Belgium |
| 2nd place, silver medalist(s) | | Edgar Cesareo Navarro Sanchez | Mexico |
| 3rd place, bronze medalist(s) | | Alvise de Vidi | Italy |

The T51 category is for wheelchair athletes having spinal cord injuries, with mild weakness in shoulders, limited ability in straightening elbows and wrist function, and no finger, trunk or leg function.

The Athletics at the 2016 Summer Paralympics – Men's 400 metres T51 event at the 2016 Paralympic Games took place on 17 September 2016, at the Estádio Olímpico João Havelange.

== Final ==
10:54 17 September 2016:

| Rank | Lane | Bib | Name | Nationality | Reaction | Time | Notes |
|---|---|---|---|---|---|---|---|
| 1st place, gold medalist(s) | 8 | 1101 | Peter Genyn | Belgium | | 1:20.82 | |
| 2nd place, silver medalist(s) | 2 | 1879 | Edgar Cesareo Navarro Sanchez | Mexico | | 1:21.82 | |
| 3rd place, bronze medalist(s) | 7 | 1706 | Alvise de Vidi | Italy | | 1:22.38 | |
| 4 | 6 | 1011 | Mohamed Berrahal | Algeria | | 1:24.06 | |
| 5 | 3 | 1515 | Stephen Osborne | Great Britain | | 1:25.05 | |
| 6 | 4 | 1458 | Toni Piispanen | Finland | | 1:30.27 | |
| 7 | 5 | 2050 | Helder Mestre | Portugal | | 1:30.82 | |
