= Athletics at the 2024 Summer Paralympics – Men's 100 metres T51 =

Men's 100 metres T51 at the XVII Paralympic Games
- Venue: Stade de France
- Dates: 6 September 2024
- Competitors: 7 from 6 nations
- Winning time: 19.63 PR, AR

Medalists
1st place, gold medalist(s)		Cody Fournie	Canada
2nd place, silver medalist(s)		Peter Genyn	Belgium
3rd place, bronze medalist(s)		Toni Piispanen	Finland

100 metres at the 2024 Summer Paralympics
Men · T11 · T12 · T13 · T34 · T35 · T36 · T37 · T38 · T44 · T47 · T51 · T52 · T53 · T54 · T63 · T64
Women · T11 · T12 · T13 · T34 · T35 · T36 · T37 · T38 · T47 · T53 · T54 · T63 · T64

The men's 100 metres T51 event at the 2024 Summer Paralympics in Paris, took place on 6 September 2024.

The T51 category is for wheelchair athletes having spinal cord injuries, with mild weakness in shoulders, limited ability in straightening elbows and wrist function, and no finger, trunk or leg function.

== Records ==
Prior to the competition, the existing records were as follows:

World record	Roger Habsch (BEL)	19.13	(United Arab Emirates) Dubai	13 February 2024
Paralympic record	Cody Fournie (CAN)	19.63	(France) Paris	6 September 2024

Area	Time		Athlete	Location	Date
Africa	20.96		(Algeria) Mohamed Berrahal	(Switzerland) Nottwil	26 May 2016
America	20.56		(Canada) Cody Fournie	(Switzerland) Nottwil	9 June 2024
Asia	21.93		(Bahrain) Mohamed Alshook	(United Arab Emirates) Dubai	27 February 2023
Europe	19.13	WR	(Belgium) Roger Habsch	(United Arab Emirates) Dubai	13 February 2024
Oceania	29.70		(Australia) Glen Bennet	(Australia) Sydney	28 January 2005

== Results ==
=== Final ===
Rank	Lane	Athlete	Nation	Time	Notes
1st place, gold medalist(s)	6	Cody Fournie	Canada	19.63	PR, AR
2nd place, silver medalist(s)	3	Peter Genyn	Belgium	20.47	
3rd place, bronze medalist(s)	2	Toni Piispanen	Finland	21.14	SB
4	5	Mohamed Berrahal	Algeria	21.83	
5	4	Edgar Navarro	Mexico	21.97	
6	7	Roger Habsch	Belgium	22.41	
7	8	Ernesto Fonseca	Costa Rica	24.80	
Source:				Wind: -0.3 m/s	
