= Athletics at the 2024 Summer Paralympics – Men's 200 metres T51 =

Men's 200 metres T51 at the XVII Paralympic Games
- Venue: Stade de France
- Dates: 3 September 2024
- Competitors: 7 from 6 nations
- Winning time: 37.64

Medalists
1st place, gold medalist(s)		Cody Fournie	Canada
2nd place, silver medalist(s)		Toni Piispanen	Finland
3rd place, bronze medalist(s)		Peter Genyn	Belgium

200 metres at the 2024 Summer Paralympics
Men · T35 · T37 · T51 · T64
Women · T11 · T12 · T35 · T36 · T37 · T47 · T64

The men's 200 metres T51 event at the 2024 Summer Paralympics in Paris, took place on 3 September 2024.

The T51 category is for wheelchair athletes having spinal cord injuries, with mild weakness in shoulders, limited ability in straightening elbows and wrist function, and no finger, trunk or leg function.

== Records ==
Prior to the competition, the existing records were as follows:

World record	Roger Habsch (BEL)	35.74	(United Arab Emirates) Dubai	15 February 2024
Paralympic record	Toni Piispanen (FIN)	36.81	(Japan) Tokyo	31 August 2021

Area	Time	Athlete	Location	Date
Africa				
America				
Asia				
Europe				
Oceania				

== Results ==
=== Final ===
Rank	Lane	Athlete	Nation	Time	Notes
1st place, gold medalist(s)	4	Cody Fournie	Canada	37.64	PB
2nd place, silver medalist(s)	7	Toni Piispanen	Finland	38.55	SB
3rd place, bronze medalist(s)	8	Peter Genyn	Belgium	38.65	
4	9	Mohamed Berrahal	Algeria	40.91	
5	6	Roger Habsch	Belgium	42.35	
6	5	Edgar Navarro	Mexico	42.92	SB
7	3	Ernesto Fonseca	Costa Rica	46.10	SB
Source:				Wind: -0.7 m/s	
