= 2023 World Para Athletics Championships – Men's 200 metres =

The men's 200 metres at the 2023 World Para Athletics Championships were held in the Charlety Stadium, Paris, France, on 12 and 17 July.

== Medalists ==
Event	Gold	Silver	Bronze
T35	Ihor Tsvietov; Ukraine	Hernan Barreto; Argentina	Fabio Bordignon; Brazil
T37	Ricardo Gomes; Brazil	Christian Gabriel Luiz; Brazil	Saptoyogo Purnomo; Indonesia
T51	Roger Habsch; Belgium	Toni Piispanen; Finland	Peter Genyn; Belgium
T64	Maxcel Amo Manu; Italy	Fabio Bottazzini; Italy	Mitchell Joynt; New Zealand

== T35 ==
The event final took place on 12 July.

Rank	Name	Nationality	Time	Notes
1st place, gold medalist(s)	Ihor Tsvietov	Ukraine	23.30	SB
2nd place, silver medalist(s)	Hernan Barreto	Argentina	25.37	AR
3rd place, bronze medalist(s)	Fabio Bordignon	Brazil	25.40	PB
4	Kyle Keyworth	Great Britain	26.29	PB
5	Matthew Paintin	United States	26.97	PB
6	Marshall Zackery	United States	27.19	SB
7	Diego Martin Gonzalez	Argentina	27.24	SB
8	Anthony Rojas	Ecuador	28.36	PB

== T37 ==
The event final took place on 12 July.

Rank	Name	Nationality	Time	Notes
1st place, gold medalist(s)	Ricardo Gomes	Brazil	22.59	CR
2nd place, silver medalist(s)	Christian Gabriel Luiz	Brazil	23.30	
3rd place, bronze medalist(s)	Saptoyoga Purnomo	Indonesia	23.39	SB
4	Yaroslav Okapinskyi	Ukraine	24.01	
5	Sofiane Hamdi	Algeria	24.08	SB
6	Michal Kotkowski	Poland	24.11	SB
7	Mykola Raiskyi	Ukraine	24.41	PB
8	Shreyansh Trivedi	India	25.26	

== T51 ==
The event final took place on 17 July.

Rank	Name	Nationality	Time	Notes
1st place, gold medalist(s)	Roger Habsch	Belgium	36.76	CR
2nd place, silver medalist(s)	Toni Piispanen	Finland	37.65	
3rd place, bronze medalist(s)	Peter Genyn	Belgium	37.88	SB
4	Edgar Navarro	Mexico	40.72	SB
5	Mohamed Berrahal	Algeria	40.84	SB
6	Cody Fournie	Canada	42.00	PB
7	Pieter du Preez	South Africa	42.94	
8	Ernesto Fonseca	Costa Rica	46.22	

== T64 ==
The event final took place on 17 July.

Rank	Name	Nationality	Time	Notes
1st place, gold medalist(s)	Maxcel Amo Manu	Italy	21.36	AR
2nd place, silver medalist(s)	Fabio Bottazzini	Italy	23.10	PB
3rd place, bronze medalist(s)	Mitchell Joynt	New Zealand	23.32	AR
4	Alberto Ávila Chamorro	Spain	23.70	SB
5	Karim Ramadan	Egypt	23.83	PB
6	Sherman Guity	Costa Rica	35.10	
	Matheus de Lima	Brazil	DNS	
