= 2014 IPC Athletics European Championships – Men's 400 metres =

The men's 400 metres at the 2014 IPC Athletics European Championships was held at the Swansea University Stadium from 18–23 August.

== Medalists ==
Event	Gold		Silver		Bronze	
T11	Timothée Adolphe; France	52.87	Semih Deniz; Turkey	54.85	—N/a	
T12	Thomas Ulbricht; Germany	50.27	Luis Goncalves; Portugal	50.31	—N/a	
T13	Egor Sharov; Russia	48.99	Alexander Zverev; Russia	51.23	Dmitry Miroshnichenko; Russia	52.27
T20	Ruud Lorain Flovany Koutiki Tsilulu; Italy	49.73	Dionibel Rodriguez Rodriguez; Spain	49.82	Vasyl Bilenko; Ukraine	51.45
T34	Henry Manni; Finland	56.03	Bojan Mitic; Switzerland	58.05	Isaac Towers; Great Britain	58.29
T36	Evgenii Shvetcov; Russia	53.59	Paul Blake; Great Britain	55.35	Andrey Zhirnov; Russia	56.90
T37	Andrey Vdovin; Russia	50.91 WR	Chermen Kobesov; Russia	51.23	Andriy Onufriyenko; Ukraine	54.82
T44	David Behre; Germany	51.97	Ivan Prokopyev; Russia	54.96	—N/a	
T47	Alexey Kotlov; Russia	50.04	Gunther Matzinger; Austria	50.89	Mehmet Ali Atmaca; Turkey	53.64
T51	Toni Piispanen; Finland	1:35.97	Peter Genyn; Belgium	1:36.07	Alvise De Vidi; Italy	1:37.10
T52	Thomas Geierspichler; Austria	1:05.71	Beat Bösch; Switzerland	1:07.15	Artem Shishkovskiy; Russia	1:09.32
T53	Moatez Jomni; Great Britain	52.78	Nicolas Brignone; France	57.09	—N/a	
T54	Kenny van Weeghel; Netherlands	48.35	Marc Schuh; Germany	48:80	Marcel Hug; Switzerland	49.39

== Results ==
=== T11 ===
Final

Rank	Sport Class	Name	Nationality	Time	Notes
1st place, gold medalist(s)	T11	Timothée Adolphe	France	52.87	
2nd place, silver medalist(s)	T11	Semih Deniz	Turkey	54.85	SB
—	T11	Hasan Huseyin Kacar	Turkey	DQ	
—	T11	Gerard Desgarrega Puigdevall	Spain	DQ	

=== T12 ===
Final

Rank	Sport Class	Name	Nationality	Time	Notes
1st place, gold medalist(s)	T12	Thomas Ulbricht	Germany	50.27	PB
2nd place, silver medalist(s)	T12	Luis Goncalves	Portugal	50.31	SB
3	T12	Elmir Jabrayilov	Azerbaijan	50.69	PB

=== T13 ===
Final

Rank	Sport Class	Name	Nationality	Time	Notes
1st place, gold medalist(s)	T13	Egor Sharov	Russia	48.99	PB
2nd place, silver medalist(s)	T13	Alexander Zverev	Russia	51.01	
3rd place, bronze medalist(s)	T13	Dmitry Miroshnichenko	Russia	52.27	PB
4	T13	Mustafa Kucuk	Turkey	53.50	PB
5	T13	Edgars Klavins	Latvia	54.54	

=== T20 ===
Semifinals

Rank	Heat	Sport Class	Name	Nationality	Time	Notes
1	2	T20	Dionibel Rodriguez Rodriguez	Spain	51.76	Q
2	2	T20	Vasyl Bilenko	Ukraine	52.17	Q
3	2	T20	Carlos Lima	Portugal	53.69	Q, PB
4	1	T20	Ruud Lorain Flovany Koutiki Tsilulu	Italy	54.03	Q
5	1	T20	Fernando Enrique Batista Restituto	Spain	54.30	Q
6	1	T20	Uberto Druiventak	Netherlands	55.29	Q
7	2	T20	Antonio Monteiro	Portugal	55.45	q
8	1	T20	Vladimir Samoliuk	Russia	56.10	q, PB
9	1	T20	Cristiano Pereira	Portugal	1:07.23	
—	2	T20	Goran Jelic	Croatia	DNF	

Final

Rank	Sport Class	Name	Nationality	Time	Notes
1st place, gold medalist(s)	T20	Ruud Lorain Flovany Koutiki Tsilulu	Italy	49.73	PB
2nd place, silver medalist(s)	T20	Dionibel Rodriguez Rodriguez	Spain	49.82	PB
3rd place, bronze medalist(s)	T20	Vasyl Bilenko	Ukraine	51.45	
4	T20	Fernando Batista Restituto	Spain	53.26	
5	T20	Carlos Lima	Portugal	52.85	
6	T20	Uberto Druiventak	Netherlands	55.56	
7	T20	Vladimir Samoliuk	Russia	55.73	PB
8	T20	Antonio Monteiro	Portugal	56.39	

=== T34 ===
Semifinals

Rank	Heat	Sport Class	Name	Nationality	Time	Notes
1	1	T34	Bojan Mitic	Switzerland	57.03	Q
2	2	T34	Henry Manni	Finland	57.43	Q
3	1	T34	Tuomas Manni	Finland	57.58	Q
4	1	T34	Ben Rowlings	United Kingdom	57.71	Q
5	2	T34	Sebastien Mobre	France	58.73	Q, SB
6	2	T34	Isaac Towers	United Kingdom	59.43	Q
7	2	T34	Stefan Rusch	Netherlands	1:02.06	q
8	2	T34	Bart Pijs	Netherlands	1:03.78	q, SB
—	1	T34	Henk Schuiling	Netherlands	DQ	

Final

Rank	Sport Class	Name	Nationality	Time	Notes
1st place, gold medalist(s)	T34	Henry Manni	Finland	56.03	
2nd place, silver medalist(s)	T34	Bojan Mitic	Switzerland	58.05	
3rd place, bronze medalist(s)	T34	Isaac Towers	United Kingdom	58.29	
4	T34	Ben Rowlings	United Kingdom	58.76	
5	T34	Tuomas Manni	Finland	59.21	
6	T34	Sebastien Mobre	France	59.82	
7	T34	Stefan Rusch	Netherlands	1:00.74	
8	T34	Bart Pijs	Netherlands	1:05.68	

=== T36 ===
Final

Rank	Sport Class	Name	Nationality	Time	Notes
1st place, gold medalist(s)	T36	Evgenii Shvetcov	Russia	53.59	SB
2nd place, silver medalist(s)	T36	Paul Blake	United Kingdom	55.35	
3rd place, bronze medalist(s)	T36	Andrey Zhirnov	Russia	56.90	
4	T36	Graeme Ballard	United Kingdom	57.18	SB
5	T36	Artem Arefyev	Russia	1:02.65	
6	T36	Jose Manuel Gonzalez	Spain	1:03.46	
7	T36	Jose Pampano	Spain	1:05.13	
8	T36	Loukas Ioannis Protonotarios	Greece	1:05.38	PB

=== T37 ===
Final

Rank	Sport Class	Name	Nationality	Time	Notes
1st place, gold medalist(s)	T37	Andrey Vdovin	Russia	50.91	WR
2nd place, silver medalist(s)	T37	Chermen Kobesov	Russia	51.23	PB
3rd place, bronze medalist(s)	T37	Andriy Onufriyenko	Ukraine	54.82	
4	T37	Iasonas Gantes	Greece	58.07	PB
5	T37	Kamil Golebski	Poland	58.45	
6	T37	Milo de Wit	Netherlands	1:03.18	
7	T37	Yaniv Musarsky	Israel	1:16.77	

=== T44 ===
Final

Rank	Sport Class	Name	Nationality	Time	Notes
1st place, gold medalist(s)	T43	David Behre	Germany	51.97	
2nd place, silver medalist(s)	T43	Ivan Prokopyev	Russia	54.96	
3	T44	Emanuele di Marino	Italy	57.32	PB

=== T47 ===
Final

Rank	Sport Class	Name	Nationality	Time	Notes
1st place, gold medalist(s)	T47	Alexey Kotlov	Russia	50.04	SB
2nd place, silver medalist(s)	T47	Gunther Matzinger	Austria	50.89	
3rd place, bronze medalist(s)	T47	Mehmet Ali Atmaca	Turkey	53.64	PB
4	T47	Ciprian Baraian	Romania	53.91	PB
5	T47	Remi Mazi	Belgium	55.40	PB
6	T47	Bayram Yilmaz	Turkey	57.42	
—	T47	Nur Ahmet Akal	Turkey	DQ	

=== T51 ===
Final

Rank	Sport Class	Name	Nationality	Time	Notes
1st place, gold medalist(s)	T51	Toni Piispanen	Finland	1:35.97	
2nd place, silver medalist(s)	T51	Peter Genyn	Belgium	1:36.07	
3rd place, bronze medalist(s)	T51	Alvise de Vidi	Italy	1:37.10	
4	T51	John McCarthy	Ireland	1:37.36	
5	T51	Stephen Osborne	United Kingdom	1:45.51	
6	T51	Stefan Strobel	Germany	1:48.08	

=== T52 ===
Final

Rank	Sport Class	Name	Nationality	Time	Notes
1st place, gold medalist(s)	T52	Thomas Geierspichler	Austria	1:05.71	
2nd place, silver medalist(s)	T52	Beat Bösch	Switzerland	1:07.15	
3rd place, bronze medalist(s)	T52	Artem Shishkovskiy	Russia	1:09.32	SB
4	T52	Rob Smith	United Kingdom	1:09.34	
—	T52	Mario Trindade	Portugal	DQ	

=== T53 ===
Final

Rank	Sport Class	Name	Nationality	Time	Notes
1st place, gold medalist(s)	T53	Moatez Jomni	United Kingdom	52.78	
2nd place, silver medalist(s)	T53	Nicolas Brignone	France	57.09	
—	T53	Pierre Fairbank	France	DQ	

=== T54 ===
Final

Rank	Sport Class	Name	Nationality	Time	Notes
1st place, gold medalist(s)	T54	Kenny van Weeghel	Netherlands	48.35	
2nd place, silver medalist(s)	T54	Marc Schuh	Germany	48.80	
3rd place, bronze medalist(s)	T54	Marcel Hug	Switzerland	49.39	
4	T54	Leo Pekka Tahti	Finland	51.30	
5	T54	Alhassane Balde	Germany	51.45	
6	T54	Niklas Almers	Sweden	53.76	
7	T54	Julien Casoli	France	54.08	

== See also ==
- List of IPC world records in athletics
