= Athletics at the 2020 Summer Paralympics – Men's 100 metres T51 =

Men's 100 metres T51 at the XVI Paralympic Games
- Venue: Tokyo National Stadium
- Dates: 3 September 2021 (final)
- Competitors: 8 from 6 nations
- Winning time: 20.33

Medalists
1st place, gold medalist(s)		Peter Genyn	Belgium
2nd place, silver medalist(s)		Toni Piispanen	Finland
3rd place, bronze medalist(s)		Roger Habsch	Belgium

Men's 100 metres
T11 · T12 · T13 · T33 · T34 · T35 · T36 · T37 · T38 · T47 · T51 · T52 · T53 · T54 · T63 · T64

The men's 100 metres T51 event at the 2020 Summer Paralympics in Tokyo, took place on 3 September 2021.

The T51 category is for wheelchair athletes having spinal cord injuries, with mild weakness in shoulders, limited ability in straightening elbows and wrist function, and no finger, trunk or leg function.

== Records ==
Prior to the competition, the existing records were as follows:

World record	Peter Genyn (BEL)	19.71	Brussels, Belgium	4 September 2020
Paralympic record	Peter Genyn (BEL)	21.15	Rio de Janeiro, Brazil	13 September 2016

Area	Time	Athlete	Nation
Africa	20.96	Mohamed Berrahal	Algeria
America	20.97	Edgar Navarro	Mexico
Asia	23.67	Yuya Nagasaki	Japan
Europe	19.71 WR	Peter Genyn	Belgium
Oceania	29.70	Glen Bennet	Australia

== Results ==
The final took place on 3 September, at 20:52:

Rank	Lane	Name	Nationality	Time	Notes
1st place, gold medalist(s)	5	Peter Genyn	Belgium	20.33	GR
2nd place, silver medalist(s)	6	Toni Piispanen	Finland	20.68	
3rd place, bronze medalist(s)	7	Roger Habsch	Belgium	20.76	
4	8	Mohamed Berrahal	Algeria	21.94	SB
5	4	Edgar Navarro	Mexico	22.92	
6	9	João Correia	Portugal	24.37	
7	3	Hélder Mestre	Portugal	24.72	
8	2	Ernesto Fonseca	Costa Rica	25.13	
