= Peter Genyn =

Belgian athlete and wheelchair rugby player

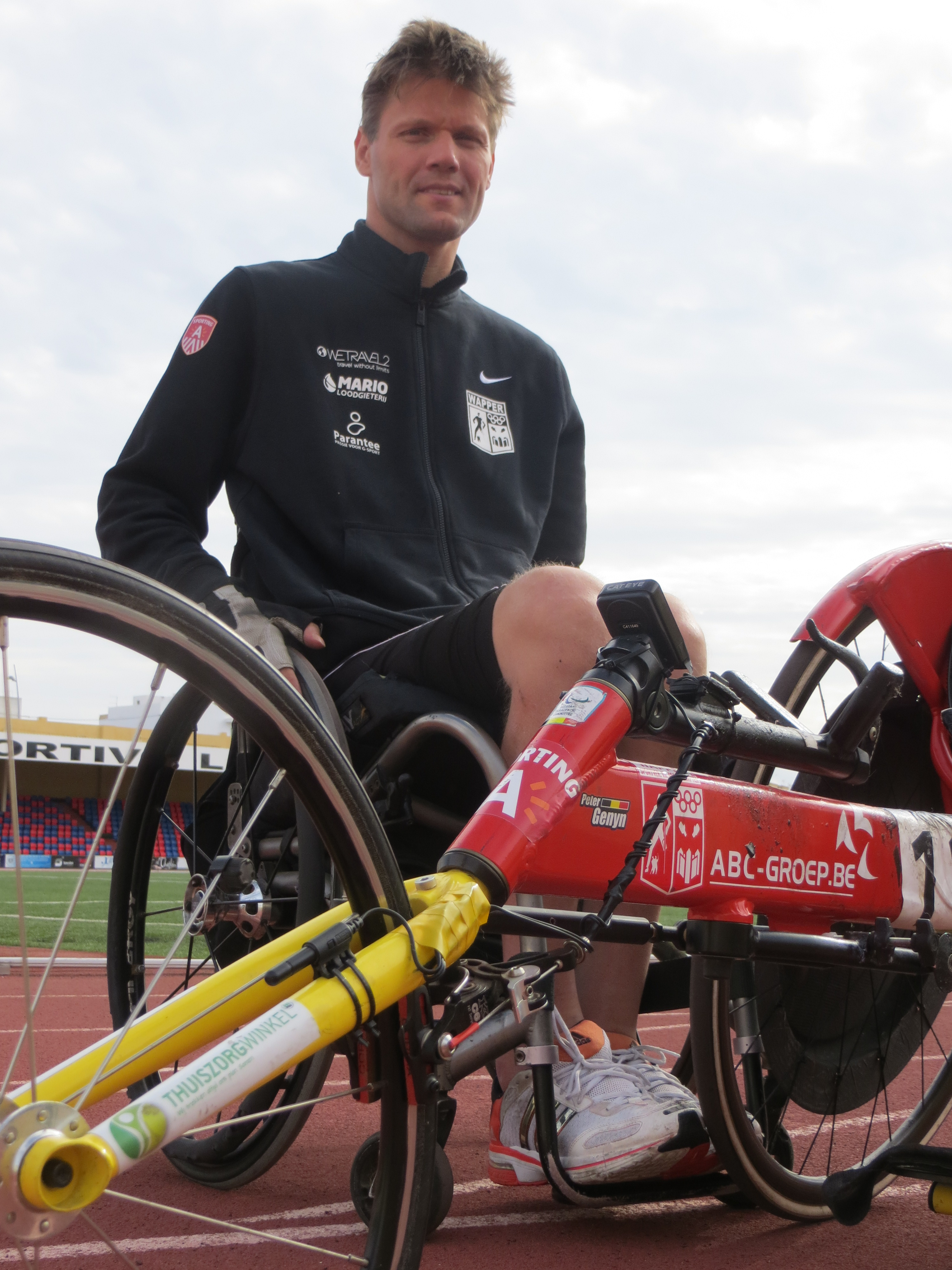
- Peter Genyn in 2016

Personal information
- Nationality: Belgian
- Born: 24 December 1976 (age 49) Brasschaat, Belgium

Sport
- Sport: Wheelchair Athletics; Wheelchair Rugby
- Club: Wapper
Medal record
Representing Belgium
Athletics
Paralympic Games
Gold medal – first place	2016 Rio de Janeiro	100m – T51
Gold medal – first place	2016 Rio de Janeiro	400m - T51
Gold medal – first place	2020 Tokyo	100m – T51
Silver medal – second place	2020 Tokyo	200m - T51
Silver medal – second place	2024 Paris	100m – T51
Bronze medal – third place	2024 Paris	200m - T51
World Championships
Gold medal – first place	2015 Doha	100m – T51
Gold medal – first place	2015 Doha	400m – T51
Gold medal – first place	2017 London	100m – T51
Gold medal – first place	2017 London	400m – T51
Gold medal – first place	2019 Dubai	200m – T51
Gold medal – first place	2023 Paris	100m – T51
Gold medal – first place	2025 New Delhi	100m – T51
Gold medal – first place	2025 New Delhi	200m – T51
Silver medal – second place	2019 Dubai	100m – T51
Bronze medal – third place	2023 Paris	200m – T51
European Championships
Gold medal – first place	2016 Grosseto	100m – T51
Gold medal – first place	2016 Grosseto	400m – T51
Gold medal – first place	2018 Berlin	100m – T51
Gold medal – first place	2018 Berlin	200m – T51
Gold medal – first place	2021 Bydgoszcz	200m – T51
Silver medal – second place	2014 Swansea	100m – T51
Silver medal – second place	2014 Swansea	400m – T51
Silver medal – second place	2021 Bydgoszcz	100m – T51
Rugby
European Championships
Gold medal – first place	2009 Hillerød	Team
Bronze medal – third place	2011 Nottwil	Team

Peter Genyn (born 24 December 1976) is a Paralympian sportsman from Belgium. Initially Genyn competed as a wheelchair rugby player before switching to track and field athletics in 2014 where he competes in category T51 sprint events. In 2016 he became the world record holder in the T51 men's 400 metres sprint.

== Personal history ==
Genyn was born in Brasschaat, Belgium in 1976. In 1990 he jumped into a shallow pond, breaking his neck which resulted in tetraplegia. He has a degree in computer science.

== Rugby ==
Genyn took up wheelchair rugby shortly after his accident in 1993, and was classified as a 1.5 player. He represented Belgium at the 2004 Summer Paralympics in Athens where the team ended sixth overall. As well as his Paralympic appearance Genyn was also part of the Belgium team at two IWRF World Championships, at Christchurch in 2006 (finishing 8th) and Vancouver in 2010 (7th). His highlight as a Wheelchair rugby player came in 2009 when he was part of the Belgium team that beat Sweden in the final of the 2009 IWRF European Championship. Genyn followed this with a second Paralympic appearance when Belgium qualified for London 2012 after finishing third in the 2011 European Championship. Genyn's wheelchair rugby career came to an end in November 2013 after he broke his leg.

== Athletics ==
After the end of his wheelchair rugby career Genyn switched to track and field athletics. Genyn switched to sprinting as he always saw himself as the fastest member of the Belgian rugby team. After being classified as a T51 athlete, Genyn appeared at his first major international competition when he represented Belgium at the 2014 IPC Athletics European Championships in Swansea. He took part in two events, the 100 and 400 metres sprints. Genyn won two silver medals, beaten in both by Finland's Toni Piispanen, another ex-wheelchair rugby player.

The following year Genyn met Piispanen again at the 2015 World Championships in Doha. This time the tables were reversed with Genyn pushing Piispanen into the lower medal places as he took gold in both the 100 metre and 400 metre races, setting championship records in both. In the build up to the Rio Paralympics, Genyn entered the 2016 European Championships in Grosseto. He won gold in both the 100 and 400 metres sprints setting a new world record time of 1:18.09 in the 400m event.

During the 2016 Summer Paralympics, Genyn managed to win the gold medal both in the 100m as well as in the 400m T51 event. One year later he successfully defended his titles at the 100 and 400 metres events at the 2017 World Championships in London. Two years later, he won gold and silver at the 200 and 100 m events respectively.

At the 2020 Summer Paralympics in Tokyo, Japan, Genyn took silver in the 200 meter T-51, coming second by half a second, and took gold in the 100 meter T-51, setting a new Paralympic record for the race. Hours before the 100 meter race, his chair was found in disrepair in what was believed an act of sabotage, but was roughly fixed using duct tape. Roger Habsch, another Belgian athlete for the same race, also found his chair damaged. He was Belgium's flag bearer at the closing ceremony.

== Awards ==
Belgian Paralympic Athlete of the Year (2017 & 2018)
