= Athletics at the 2020 Summer Paralympics – Men's 100 metres T34 =

Men's 100 metres T34 at the XVI Paralympic Games
- Venue: Tokyo National Stadium
- Dates: 30 August 2021 (final)
- Competitors: 9 from 8 nations
- Winning time: 15.01

Medalists
1st place, gold medalist(s)		Walid Ktila	Tunisia
2nd place, silver medalist(s)		Rheed McCracken	Australia
3rd place, bronze medalist(s)		Mohamed Alhammadi	United Arab Emirates

Men's 100 metres
T11 · T12 · T13 · T33 · T34 · T35 · T36 · T37 · T38 · T47 · T51 · T52 · T53 · T54 · T63 · T64

The men's 100 metres T34 event at the 2020 Summer Paralympics in Tokyo, took place on 30 August 2021.

The T34 category is for wheelchair athletes with cerebral palsy. Athletes in this category have minimal limitations or control problems in their arms and trunk while pushing a wheelchair.

== Records ==
Prior to the competition, the existing records were as follows:

World record	Walid Ktila (TUN)	14.46	Arbon, Switzerland	1 June 2019
Paralympic record	Walid Ktila (TUN)	15.14	Rio de Janeiro, Brazil	12 September 2016

Area	Time	Athlete	Nation
Africa	14.46 WR	Walid Ktila	Tunisia
America	15.54	Austin Smeenk	Canada
Asia	15.41	Mohamed Alhammadi	United Arab Emirates
Europe	15.25	Craig Boardman	Great Britain
Oceania	14.79	Rheed McCracken	Australia

== Results ==
The final took place on 30 August 2021, at 10:43:

Rank	Lane	Name	Nationality	Time	Notes
1st place, gold medalist(s)	5	Walid Ktila	Tunisia	15.01	PR
2nd place, silver medalist(s)	3	Rheed McCracken	Australia	15.37	SB
3rd place, bronze medalist(s)	4	Mohamed Alhammadi	United Arab Emirates	15.66	SB
4	1	Wang Yang	China	15.80	PB
5	8	Henry Manni	Finland	15.84	
6	7	Chaiwat Rattana	Thailand	15.87	SB
7	6	Austin Smeenk	Canada	15.92	
8	2	Ahmed Nawad	United Arab Emirates	15.99	PB
9	9	Ben Rowlings	Great Britain	16.77	
