= Athletics at the 2020 Summer Paralympics – Men's 200 metres T51 =

Men's 200 metres T51 at the XVI Paralympic Games
- Venue: Tokyo National Stadium
- Dates: 31 August 2021 (final)
- Competitors: 7 from 6 nations
- Winning time: 36.81

Medalists
1st place, gold medalist(s)		Toni Piispanen	Finland
2nd place, silver medalist(s)		Peter Genyn	Belgium
3rd place, bronze medalist(s)		Roger Habsch	Belgium

The men's 200 metres T51 event at the 2020 Summer Paralympics in Tokyo, took place on 31 August 2021.

The T51 category is for wheelchair athletes having spinal cord injuries, with mild weakness in shoulders, limited ability in straightening elbows and wrist function, and no finger, trunk or leg function.

== Records ==
Prior to the competition, the existing records were as follows:

World record	Peter Genyn (BEL)	36.62	Nottwil, Switzerland	2 June 2017
Paralympic record	Edgar Navarro (MEX)	39.70	Athens, Greece	25 September 2004

Area	Time	Athlete	Nation
Africa	40.70	Mohamed Berrahal	Algeria
America	36.91	Edgar Navarro	Mexico
Asia	41.03	Masanori Ueda	Japan
Europe	36.62 WR	Peter Genyn	Belgium
Oceania	54.74	Glen Bennet	Australia

== Results ==
The final took place on 31 August 2021, at 10:18:

Rank	Lane	Name	Nationality	Time	Notes
1st place, gold medalist(s)	6	Toni Piispanen	Finland	36.81	GR
2nd place, silver medalist(s)	5	Peter Genyn	Belgium	37.11	
3rd place, bronze medalist(s)	3	Roger Habsch	Belgium	38.33	
4	8	Mohamed Berrahal	Algeria	40.04	AR
5	4	Edgar Navarro	Mexico	41.04	SB
6	7	Helder Mestre	Portugal	42.75	SB
7	2	Ernesto Fonseca	Costa Rica	47.95	
