= Athletics at the 2020 Summer Paralympics – Men's 800 metres T34 =

Men's 800 metres T34 at the XVI Paralympic Games
- Venue: Tokyo National Stadium
- Dates: 3 September 2021 (heats); 4 September 2021 (final)
- Competitors: 10 from 8 nations
- Winning time: 1:45.50

Medalists
1st place, gold medalist(s)		Walid Ktila	Tunisia
2nd place, silver medalist(s)		Mohamed Alhammadi	United Arab Emirates
3rd place, bronze medalist(s)		Wang Yang	China

The men's 800 metres T34 event at the 2020 Summer Paralympics in Tokyo, took place between 3 and 4 September 2021.

The T34 category is for wheelchair athletes with cerebral palsy. Athletes in this category have minimal limitations or control problems in their arms and trunk while pushing a wheelchair.

== Records ==
Prior to the competition, the existing records were as follows:

World Record	Walid Ktila (TUN)	1:36.78	Arbon, Switzerland	24 May 2021
Paralympic Record	Mohamed Alhammadi (UAE)	1:40.24	Rio de Janeiro, Brazil	14 September 2016

Area	Time	Athlete	Nation
Africa	1:36.78 WR	Walid Ktila	Tunisia
America	1:42.63	Austin Smeenk	Canada
Asia	1:37.84	Mohamed Alhammadi	United Arab Emirates
Europe	1:39.12	Ben Rowlings	Great Britain
Oceania	1:41.25	Rheed McCracken	Australia

== Results ==
=== Heats ===
Heat 1 took place on 3 September 2021, at 11:29:

Rank	Lane	Name	Nationality	Time	Notes
1	3	Mohamed Alhammadi	United Arab Emirates	1:45.50	Q, SB
2	4	Isaac Towers	Great Britain	1:46.58	Q, SB
3	6	Henry Manni	Finland	1:46.84	Q
4	7	Austin Smeenk	Canada	1:46.99	q
5	5	Chaiwat Rattana	Thailand	1:53.75	SB

Heat 2 took place on 3 September 2021, at 11:36:

Rank	Lane	Name	Nationality	Time	Notes
1	5	Walid Ktila	Tunisia	1:46.59	Q
2	3	Wang Yang	China	1:47.48	Q, SB
3	6	Rheed McCracken	Australia	1:48.09	Q, SB
4	4	Ben Rowlings	Great Britain	1:48.21	q
5	7	Ahmed Nawad	United Arab Emirates	1:49.71	

=== Final ===
The final took place on 4 September 2021, at 9:55:

Rank	Lane	Name	Nationality	Time	Notes
1st place, gold medalist(s)	4	Walid Ktila	Tunisia	1:45.50	
2nd place, silver medalist(s)	3	Mohamed Alhammadi	United Arab Emirates	1:45.59	
3rd place, bronze medalist(s)	2	Wang Yang	China	1:45.68	SB
4	6	Henry Manni	Finland	1:47.34	
5	8	Austin Smeenk	Canada	1:47.58	
6	1	Rheed McCracken	Australia	1:47.68	SB
7	5	Isaac Towers	Great Britain	1:48.08	
8	7	Ben Rowlings	Great Britain	1:48.63	
