= 2018 World Para Athletics European Championships – Men's 100 metres =

The men's 100 metres at the 2018 World Para Athletics European Championships was held at the Friedrich-Ludwig-Jahn-Sportpark in Berlin from 20–26 August. RaceRunning events (running events involving adapted tricycle frames for athletes with severe balance difficulties) were included for the first time as RR1 and RR3 events. 18 classification finals are held in all over this distance.

== Medalists ==
Event	Gold		Silver		Bronze	
T11	Timothée Adolphe (FRA); Guide : Jeffrey Lami	11.17	Martin Parejo Maza (ESP); Guide : Albert Selva Comadran	11.84	no medal award	
T12	Athanasios Ghavelas (GRE)	11.47	Hakan Cira (TUR)	11.57	Luis Goncalves (POR)	11.61
T13	Jason Smyth (IRL)	10.66 CR	Mateusz Michalski (POL)	10.99	Jakub Nicpoń (POL)	11.33
RR1	Christensen Nikolaj (DEN)	26.98 CR	Olsson da Silva (SWE)	28.02	Henrik Eriksson (SWE)	42.51
RR3 (open to RR2 athletes)	Gavin Drysdale (GBR)	17.37 CR	Rafi Solaiman (GBR)	19.33	Lasse Kromann (DEN)	21.10
T33	Harri Jenkins (GBR)	19.44	no medals award			
T34	Stefan Rusch (NED)	16.14	Henry Manni (FIN)	16.44	Bojan Mitic (SUI)	16.75
T35	Ihor Tsvietov (UKR)	12.77	no medals award			
T36	Graeme Ballard (GBR)	12.32	Roman Pavlyk (UKR)	12.55	Krzysztof Ciuksza (POL)	12.61
T37	Vladyslav Zahrebelnyi (UKR)	11.86	Rhys Jones (GBR)	12.10	Michał Kotkowski (POL)	12.19
T38	Thomas Young (GBR)	11.66	Mykyta Senyk (UKR)	11.98	Lorenzo Albaladejo Martinez (ESP)	12.27
T47	Michal Derus (POL)	10.77	Danas Sodaitis (LTU)	11.19	Phil Grolla (GER)	11.36
T51	Peter Genyn (BEL)	22.82	Toni Piispanen (FIN)	23.84	Stephen Osborne (GBR)	25.68
T52	Mario Trindade (POR)	18.53	Beat Boesch (SUI)	18.60	Farhan Hadafo Adawe (ITA)	19.25
T53	Pierre Fairbank (FRA)	15.65	Nicolas Brignone (FRA)	16.10	Moatez Jomni (GBR)	17.05
T54	Leo Pekka Tahti (FIN)	13.83 CR	Kenny van Weeghel (NED)	14.65	Nathan Maguire (GBR)	15.14
T63	Daniel Wagner (DEN)	13.10	Clavel Kayitare (FRA)	13.42	Joël de Jong (NED)	14.17
T64	Felix Streng (GER)	11.23 CR	Johannes Floors (GER)	11.44	Simone Manigrasso (ITA)	11.81
WR world record | AR area record | CR championship record | GR games record | NR national record | OR Olympic record | PB personal best | SB season best | WL world leading (in a given season)

== See also ==
- List of IPC world records in athletics
