= Mohammed Al-Hammadi =

Mohammed Al-Hammadi may refer to:

- Mohammed Al-Hammadi (footballer, born 1997)
- Mohamed Hammadi (born 1995), UAE Paralympic athlete
- Mohamed Alhammadi (athlete) (born 1991), UAE Olympic runner
- Mohammed Ali Hammadi (1964–2025), person on FBI's Most Wanted Terrorists list
