= Pavlo Kaplun =

Ukrainian para athlete (born 2005)

Personal information
- Nationality: Ukrainian
- Born: 1 September 2005 (age 20)

Sport
- Sport: Para athletics
- Disability class: T44
- Event(s): 100 metres 200 metres
Medal record
Men's para-athletics
Representing Ukraine
World Championships
Silver medal – second place	2025 New Delhi	200 m T44

Pavlo Kaplun (Ukrainian: Павло Каплун; born 1 September 2005) is a Ukrainian T44 para athlete who competes in sprinting events.

== Career ==
In September 2025, Kaplun made his international debut at the 2025 World Para Athletics Championships. He competed in the 100 metres T44 event, where he finished in fourth place behind Marco Cicchetti. He then won a silver medal in the 200 metres T44 event, which was his first international medal.
