= 2025 World Para Athletics Championships – Men's 200 metres =

The men's 200 metres events at the 2025 World Para Athletics Championships were held at the Jawaharlal Nehru Stadium, Delhi in New Delhi.

== Medalists ==
Event	Gold	Silver	Bronze
T35	David Dzhatiev; Neutral Paralympic Athletes	Dmitrii Safronov; Neutral Paralympic Athletes	Ihor Tsvietov; Ukraine
T37	Ricardo Gomes de Mendonça; Brazil	Bartolomeu Chaves; Brazil	Andrey Vdovin; Neutral Paralympic Athletes
T44	Marco Cicchetti; Italy	Pavlo Kaplun; Ukraine	Sandeep; India
T51	Peter Genyn; Belgium	Roger Habsch; Belgium	Edgar Navarro; Mexico
T64	Felix Streng; Germany	Sherman Guity; Costa Rica	Francesco Loragno; Italy

== T35 ==
Final

The event took place on 30 September.

Rank	Lane	Name	Nationality	Time	Notes
1st place, gold medalist(s)	6	David Dzhatiev	Neutral Paralympic Athletes	23.01	CR
2nd place, silver medalist(s)	8	Dmitrii Safronov	Neutral Paralympic Athletes	23.13	SB
3rd place, bronze medalist(s)	7	Ihor Tsvietov	Ukraine	23.64	SB
4	4	Artem Kalashian	Neutral Paralympic Athletes	23.75	SB
5	5	Henrique Caetano Nascimento	Brazil	23.76	AM
6	2	Ivan Tetiukhin	Ukraine	23.95	PB
7	9	Maximiliano Villa	Argentina	24.26	PB
8	3	Jackson Love	Australia	24.71	OC
				Wind: (−0.1 m/s)	

Round 1

The event took place on 29 September. Qualification: First 3 in each heat (Q) and the next 2 fastest (q) advance to the Final

Rank	Heat	Lane	Name	Nationality	Time	Notes
1	2	7	David Dzhatiev	Neutral Paralympic Athletes	23.58	Q, SB
2	1	7	Ihor Tsvietov	Ukraine	23.80	Q, SB
3	2	4	Dmitrii Safronov	Neutral Paralympic Athletes	23.86	Q, SB
4	1	4	Henrique Caetano Nascimento	Brazil	24.14	Q, =AM
5	2	6	Maximiliano Villa	Argentina	24.30	Q, PB
6	2	5	Ivan Tetiukhin	Ukraine	24.31	q, PB
7	1	5	Artem Kalashian	Neutral Paralympic Athletes	24.39	Q, SB
8	1	6	Jackson Love	Australia	24.73	q, OC
9	1	8	Jordan Fairweather	Australia	26.54	PB
10	2	9	Jack Netting	Australia	27.21	
11	2	8	Bao Chui Yiu	Hong Kong	31.08	
				Wind: (−0.9 m/s), (−0.4 m/s)		

== T37 ==
Final

The event took place on 30 September.

Rank	Lane	Name	Nationality	Time	Notes
1st place, gold medalist(s)	8	Ricardo Gomes de Mendonça	Brazil	22.77	SB
2nd place, silver medalist(s)	4	Bartolomeu Chaves	Brazil	23.10	PB
3rd place, bronze medalist(s)	3	Andrey Vdovin	Neutral Paralympic Athletes	23.31	SB
4	7	Anton Feoktistov	Neutral Paralympic Athletes	23.47	PB
5	5	Ali Alnakhli	Saudi Arabia	23.56	
6	9	Michał Kotkowski	Poland	23.66	
7	2	Mykola Raiskyi	Ukraine	23.86	
	6	Christian Gabriel Costa	Brazil	DNS	
				Wind: (−0.8 m/s)	

Round 1

The event took place on 30 September. Qualification: First 3 in each heat (Q) and the next 2 fastest (q) advance to the Final

Rank	Heat	Lane	Name	Nationality	Time	Notes
1	1	8	Ricardo Gomes de Mendonça	Brazil	23.30	Q
2	2	2	Christian Gabriel Costa	Brazil	23.46	Q, SB
3	1	9	Anton Feoktistov	Neutral Paralympic Athletes	23.49	Q, PB
4	2	3	Ali Alnakhli	Saudi Arabia	23.53	Q, SB
5	2	7	Bartolomeu Chaves	Brazil	23.57	Q, SB
6	2	9	Andrey Vdovin	Neutral Paralympic Athletes	23.58	q, SB
7	1	6	Michał Kotkowski	Poland	23.59	Q, SB
8	1	5	Mykola Raiskyi	Ukraine	23.61	q, PB
9	1	4	Chermen Kobesov	Neutral Paralympic Athletes	23.63	SB
10	2	6	Samuel Allen	Australia	23.72	OC
11	2	5	Yaroslav Okapinskyi	Ukraine	24.20	SB
12	1	3	Ronald Rich	Botswana	24.70	SB
13	2	8	Petrus Karuli	Namibia	24.86	PB
14	1	2	Saptoyogo Purnomo	Indonesia	25.01	
	2	4	Samson Opiyo	Kenya	DQ	
	1	7	Liam Kernick	Australia	DNS	
				Wind: (+0.1 m/s), (−0.4 m/s)		

== T44 ==
Final

The event took place on 5 October.

Rank	Lane	Name	Nationality	Time	Notes
1st place, gold medalist(s)	7	Marco Cicchetti	Italy	23.00	ER
2nd place, silver medalist(s)	8	Pavlo Kaplun	Ukraine	23.12	
3rd place, bronze medalist(s)	3	Sandeep	India	23.60	PB
4	5	Dušan Knežević	Serbia	23.77	PB
5	9	Karim Ramadan	Egypt	23.81	PB
6	4	Andrii Kondratiuk	Ukraine	23.83	PB
7	2	Nour Alsana	Saudi Arabia	24.98	
	6	Naif Almasrahi	Saudi Arabia	DNF	
				Wind: (+0.7 m/s)	

Round 1

The event took place on 5 October. Qualification: First 3 in each heat (Q) and the next 2 fastest (q) advance to the Final

Rank	Heat	Lane	Name	Nationality	Time	Notes
1	2	7	Pavlo Kaplun	Ukraine	23.47	Q
2	1	7	Marco Cicchetti	Italy	23.58	Q
3	1	6	Naif Almasrahi	Saudi Arabia	23.60	Q
4	2	8	Karim Ramadan	Egypt	23.87	Q, SB
5	2	2	Dušan Knežević	Serbia	23.94	Q, PB
6	2	5	Sandeep	India	23.99	q, PB
7	1	5	Andrii Kondratiuk	Ukraine	24.01	Q, PB
8	2	6	Nour Alsana	Saudi Arabia	24.14	q
9	1	8	Huang Ruihua	China	24.24	PB
10	1	2	Indika Gamage	Sri Lanka	24.65	SB
11	2	4	Romildo Pereira Santos	Brazil	24.91	
12	1	9	Denzel Namene	Namibia	25.23	SB
	1	4	Dzmitry Bartashevich	Neutral Paralympic Athletes	DNF	
	2	9	Michael Shippley	Australia	DNS	
				Wind: (+0.9 m/s), (±0.0 m/s)		

== T51 ==
Final

The event took place on 5 October.

Rank	Lane	Name	Nationality	Time	Notes
1st place, gold medalist(s)	6	Peter Genyn	Belgium	37.95	SB
2nd place, silver medalist(s)	8	Roger Habsch	Belgium	38.87	
3rd place, bronze medalist(s)	5	Édgar Navarro	Mexico	41.65	SB
4	7	Helder Mestre	Portugal	46.17	
5	4	Mohamed Alshook	Qatar	48.71	SB
				Wind: (−0.4 m/s)	

== T64 ==
Final

The event took place on 5 October.

Rank	Lane	Name	Nationality	Time	Notes
1st place, gold medalist(s)	8	Felix Streng	Germany	21.60	SB
2nd place, silver medalist(s)	8	Sherman Guity	Costa Rica	21.70	
3rd place, bronze medalist(s)	9	Francesco Loragno	Italy	22.56	PB
4	4	Levi Vloet	Netherlands	22.63	
5	5	Wallison André Fortes	Brazil	22.79	
6	3	Mitchell Joynt	New Zealand	23.24	
7	6	Jonathan Gore	United States	23.35	
8	2	Jesús Castillo	Peru	23.94	
				Wind: (−0.5 m/s)	

Round 1

The event took place on 5 October. Qualification: First 3 in each heat (Q) and the next 2 fastest (q) advance to the Final

Rank	Heat	Lane	Name	Nationality	Time	Notes
1	2	4	Felix Streng	Germany	22.39	Q
2	1	8	Sherman Guity	Costa Rica	22.47	Q
3	2	5	Maxcel Amo Manu	Italy	22.56	Q
4	1	7	Levi Vloet	Netherlands	22.59	Q, SB
5	2	7	Wallison André Fortes	Brazil	22.61	Q
6	1	3	Francesco Loragno	Italy	22.79	Q
7	1	9	Mitchell Joynt	New Zealand	22.98	q, OC
8	2	8	Jesús Castillo	Peru	23.19	q
9	2	9	Jonathan Gore	United States	23.21	
10	1	4	Michail Seitis	Greece	23.43	
11	1	5	Petr Mikhalkov	Neutral Paralympic Athletes	23.65	SB
12	2	6	Alberto Ávila Chamorro	Spain	23.95	
13	1	6	Denpoom Kotcharang	Thailand	24.45	SB
				Wind: (+1.7 m/s), (+2.2 m/s)		
