= Rheed McCracken =

Australian Paralympic athlete

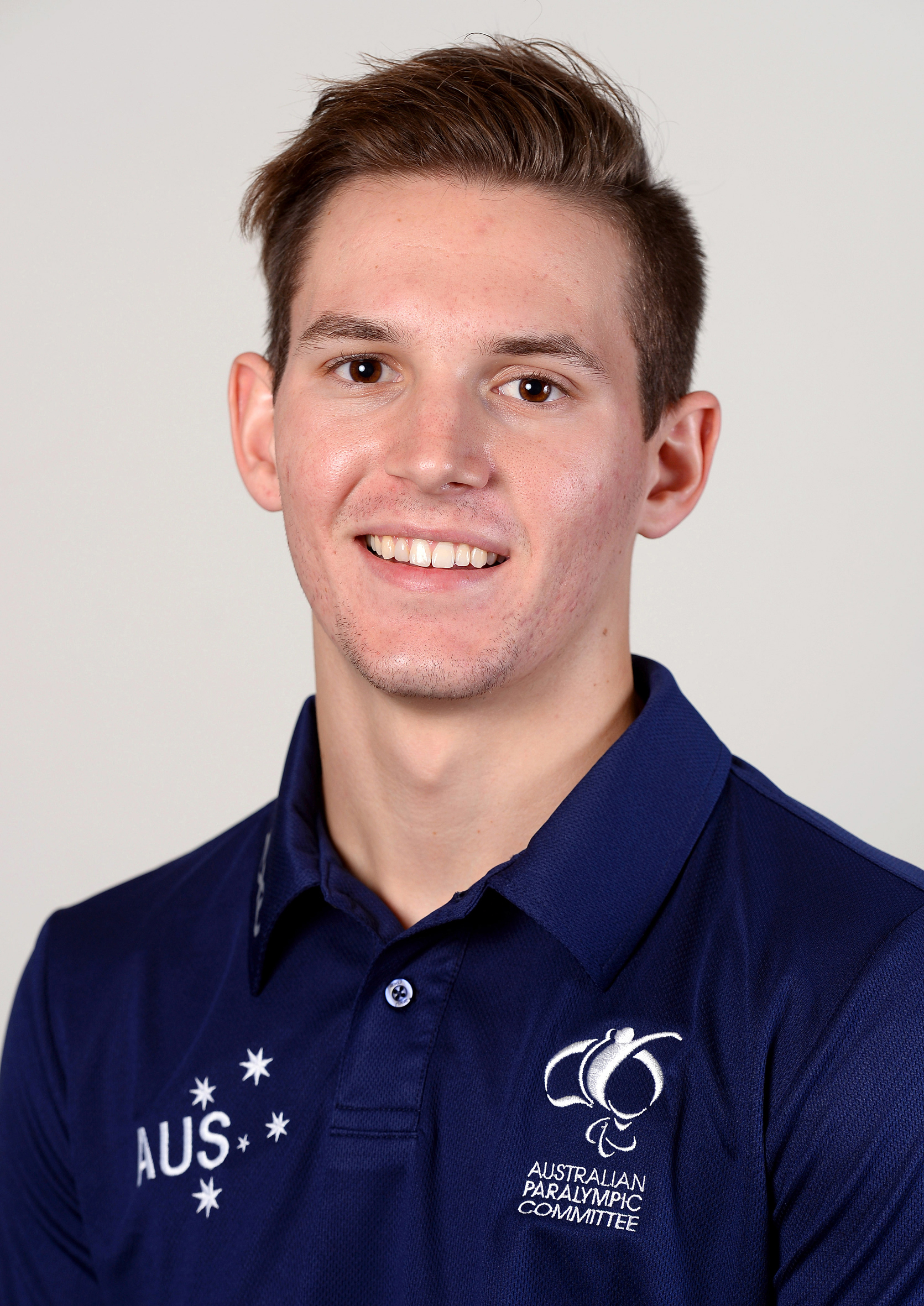
- 2016 Australian Paralympic team portrait

Personal information
- Nationality: Australian
- Born: 20 January 1997 (age 29) Bundaberg, Queensland

Sport
- Country: Australia
- Sport: Athletics
- Disability: cerebral palsy
- Events: T34 – 100 metres T34 – 200 metres T34 – 400 metres T34 – 800 metres
- Club: Bundaberg Athletic Club
Medal record
Men's para-athletics
Paralympic Games
Silver medal – second place	2012 London	100 m T34
Silver medal – second place	2016 Rio	100 m T34
Silver medal – second place	2020 Tokyo	100 m T34
Bronze medal – third place	2012 London	200 m T34
Bronze medal – third place	2016 Rio	800 m T34
Bronze medal – third place	2024 Paris	800 m T34
World Championships
Silver medal – second place	2013 Lyon	100 m T34
Silver medal – second place	2013 Lyon	200 m T34
Silver medal – second place	2013 Lyon	400 m T34
Silver medal – second place	2017 London	100 m T34
Silver medal – second place	2019 Dubai	100 m T34
Silver medal – second place	2025 New Delhi	100 m T34
Silver medal – second place	2025 New Delhi	400 m T34
Bronze medal – third place	2013 Lyon	800 m T34
Bronze medal – third place	2017 London	200 m T34

Rheed McCracken (born 20 January 1997) is an Australian Paralympic athletics competitor. He named the 2012 Junior Athlete of the Year as part of the Australian Paralympian of the Year Awards. He represented Australia at the 2012 London Paralympics, 2016 Rio Paralympics, 2020 Tokyo Paralympics and the 2024 Paris Paralympics, where he won three silver and three bronze medals.

== Personal ==
McCracken was born on 20 January 1997, and is from Bundaberg. McCracken has cerebral palsy, a condition he was born with. He started using a wheelchair in late 2009 because it was less painful. He attended Avoca State School. He later attended Bundaberg State High School. He has completed a TAFE Certificate 3 in Community Pharmacy.

== Athletics ==
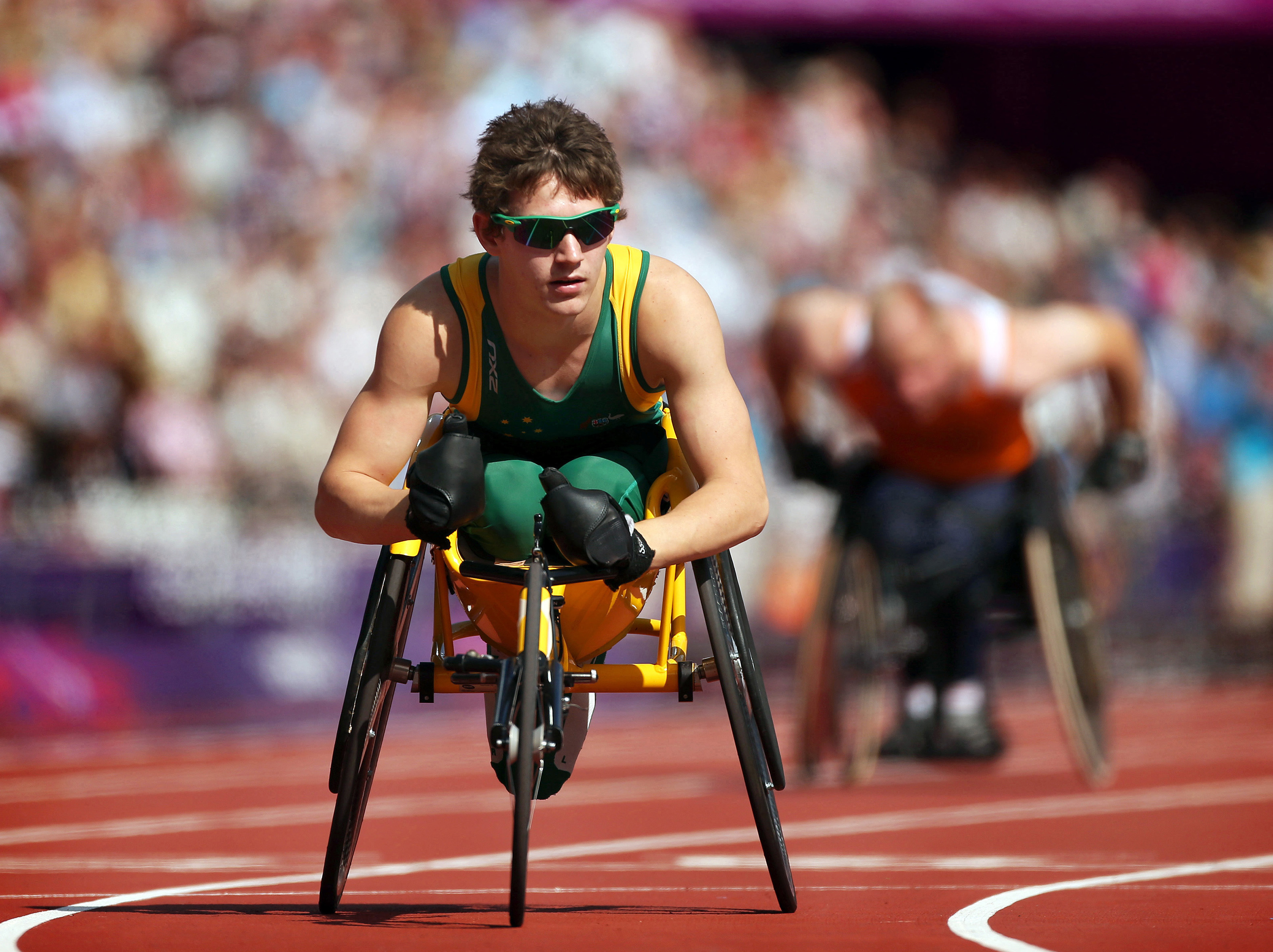
McCracken at the 2012 London Paralympics

McCracken is a wheelchair racer, competing in the T34 class. He competes in 100 metres, 200 metres, 400 metres, 800 metres and 1,500 metres.

He began competing in athletics in 2005, and started wheelchair racing in 2010. He is a member of the Bundaberg Athletic Club.

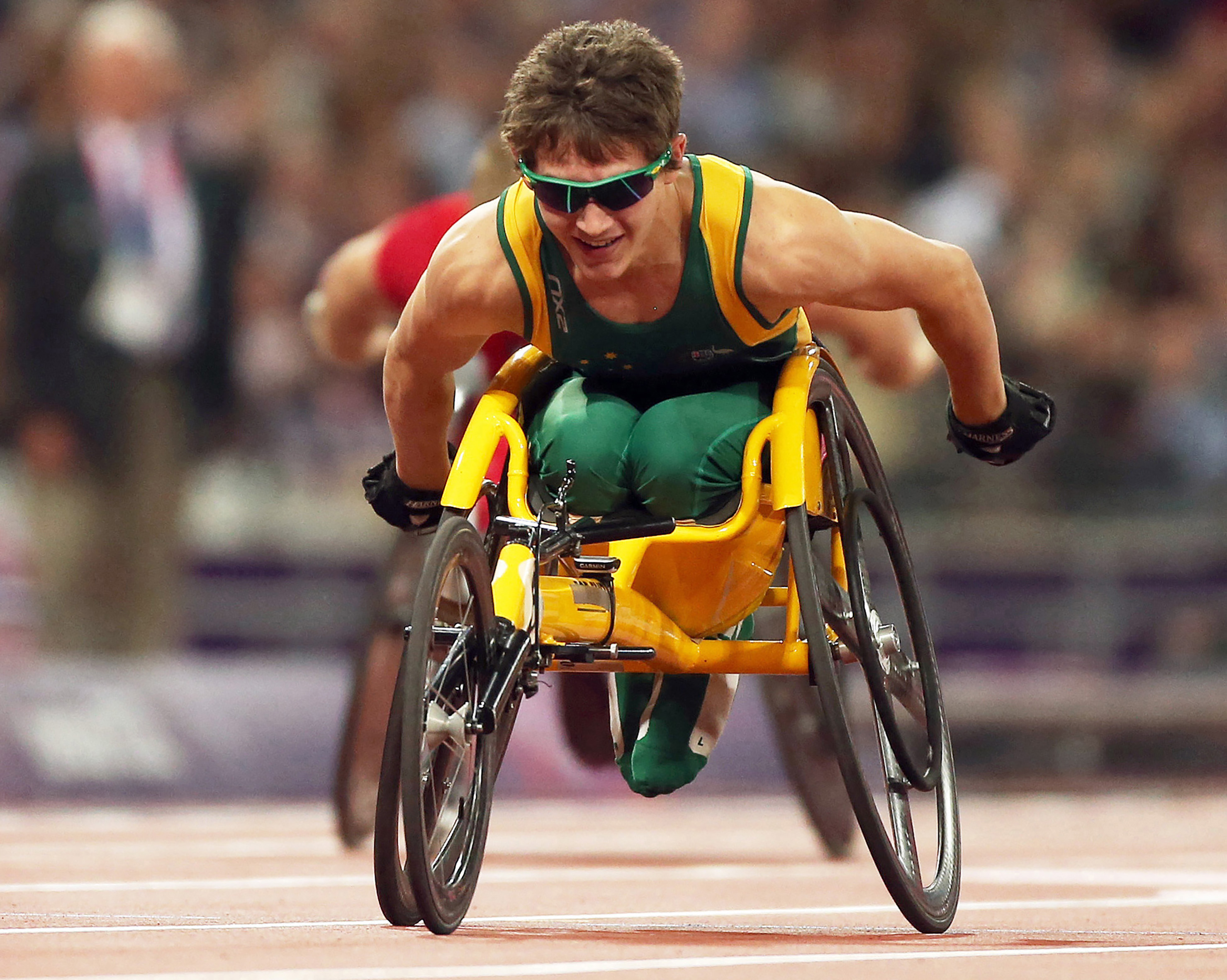
McCracken at the 2012 London Paralympics

In 2008, at the Queensland 12 years and under Track and Field Championships, McCracken came in first place in the boys 11 years AWD 100m, 200m, long jump, shot put and discus events. In 2008, he participated in the Pan Pacific Games in Canberra. He took home first place in the Athletes With a Disability (AWD) 11 years boys' 100m, long jump, shot put and discus events. In 2009, he participated in the Queensland State Championships in the boys 12 years Athletes With a Disability long jump, 100m, discus and shot put events, winning every one of them.

In 2010, McCracken competed in the Queensland Secondary Schools Championships, where he won the AWD boys 400m event. That year, he also competed at the Queensland State Championships and the Australian National Championships.

In 2011, McCracken made his Australian national team debut During 2011, in preparation for the Paralympics, he completed six total training sessions a week. He finished third at the Gold Coast Airport Marathon's wheelchair half-marathon in July 2011. In 2011, he competed in Sydney's City2Surf event in the first year the event had an elite wheelchair category. In December, he competed at the 2011 International Wheelchair and Amputee Championships in Dubai, where he won the 100 metre wheelchair racing event with a time of 16.86 seconds. The time qualified him for the 2012 Paralympics as the qualifying time was 17 seconds. Other events he competed in included the 200 metres, 400 metres, 800 metres and 1,500 metres, taking silver in the 400 metres, 800 metres and 1,500 metres events. He was half a second slow in the 200 metres event from setting a Paralympic qualifying time. Making his national team debut, he was one of the youngest members of the Australian team at the event. In December 2011, he participated in a national athletics team training camp in Canberra.

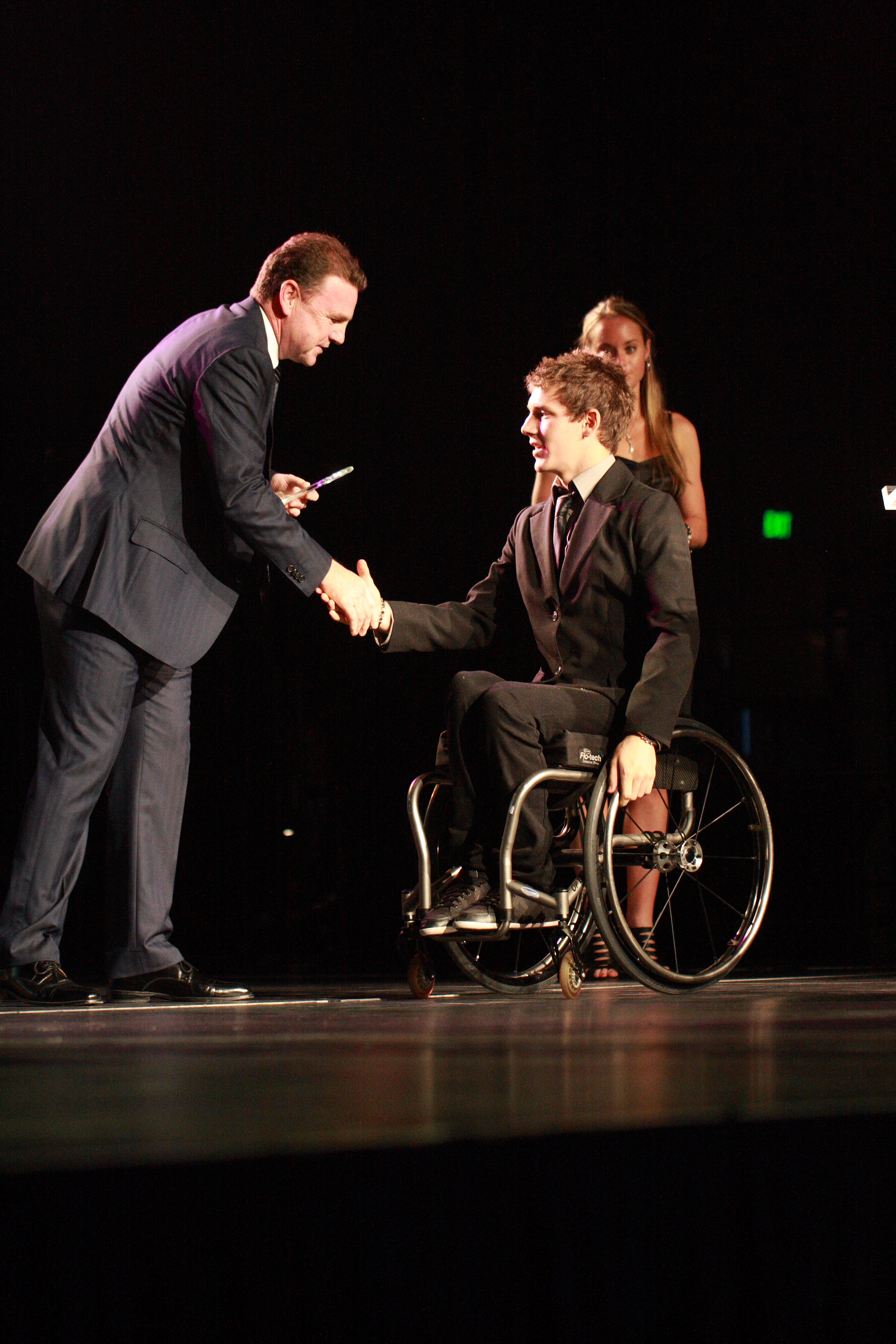
McCracken receiving the award for 2012 Junior Athlete of the Year at the Australian Paralympian of the Year ceremony

In January 2012, McCracken participated in the Australia Day Series in Canberra, where he finished second with a time of 24.38 in the junior race. In January 2012, he trained in Sydney. He later trained with Kurt Fearnley in Newcastle. In January 2012, he finished second the Oz Day 10K men's junior division. He was selected to represent Australia at the 2012 Summer Paralympics in athletics in the 100 metre and 200 metre events. He qualified for the Games in December 2011 as a fourteen-year-old.

At the 2012 Summer Paralympics McCracken won a silver in the Men's 100 m T34 and a bronze in the Men's 200 m T34. Competing at the 2013 IPC Athletics World Championships in Lyon, France, he won three silver medals in the Men's 100 m, 200 m T34 and Men's 400 m and a bronze medal in Men's 800 m T34.

At the 2016 Rio Paralympics, he won the silver medal in the Men's 100 m T34 and a bronze medal in the Men's 800 m T34.

At the Swiss National Championships in Arbon on 28 May 2017, McCracken set a new world record in the Men's 100m T34 with a time of 14.92.

At the 2017 World Para Athletics Championships in London, England, McCracken won the silver medal in the Men's 100m T34 (15.40 (+0.3)) and a bronze medal in the Men's 200m T34 (27.81 (-1.5)).

At the 2019 World Para Athletics Championships in Dubai, he won his third world championship silver medal in the Men's 100 m T34.

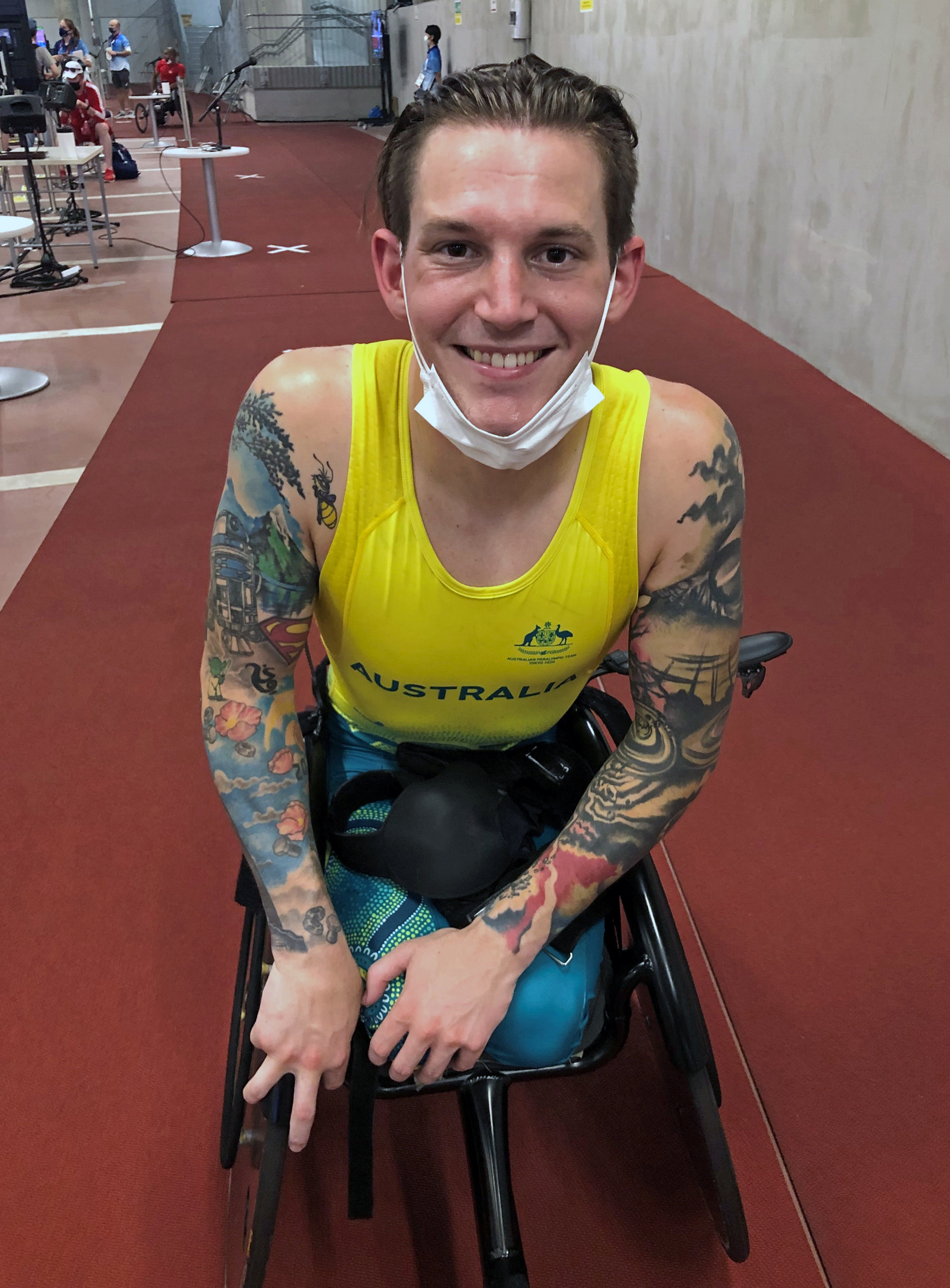
Australian athlete Rheed McCracken after the men's T34 100m at the Tokyo 2020 Paralympic Games

At the 2020 Tokyo Summer Paralympics, he won the silver medal in the Men's 100m T34. McCracken finished seventh in his Men's 800m T34 heat and qualified for the final. He came sixth in the final and failed to win a medal in this event.

At the 2024 Paris Paralympics, he won the bronze medal in the Men's 800m T34 and finished fourth in the Men's 100m T34. At the 2025 World Para Athletics Championships in New Delhi, he won silver medals in the Men's 100m and 400m and finished fourth in Men's 800m T34 events.

He is coached by Louise Sauvage OAM.

=== World records ===
Distance	Time	Location	Date
Men's 100m T34	14.92 (+1.0)	Arbon, Switzerland	27 May 2017
Men's 100m T34	14.80	Nottwil, Switzerland	26 May 2018

== Recognition ==
- 2012 Junior Athlete of the Year as part of the Australian Paralympian of the Year Awards.
- 2016 – Junior Male Athlete of the Year – Sporting Wheelies and Disabled Association.
