= Rafi Solaiman =

British para athlete (born 1999)

Personal information
- Nationality: English
- Born: 16 December 1999 (age 26)

Sport
- Sport: Para athletics
- Disability class: RR3, T72
- Event: 100 metres
Medal record
Men's para-athletics
Representing Great Britain
World Championships
Silver medal – second place	2019 Dubai	100 m RR3
Silver medal – second place	2023 Paris	100 m T72
European Championships
Gold medal – first place	2021 Bydgoszcz	100 m RR3
Silver medal – second place	2018 Berlin	100 m RR3

Rafi Solaiman (born 16 December 1999) is an English frame runner who competes in T72 sprint events. He is a two-time World medalist and two-time European medalist.

== Early life ==
When Solaiman was twelve years of age, he suffered a stroke in which he would survive, spending six months in Sheffield Children’s Hospital and four months in a rehabilitation centre. Shortly afterward, he would discover frame running. He stated that it helped him accept his medical condition and also opened doors he hadn't thought of.

== Career ==
In July 2018, Solaiman was named to British team for the European Championships. He competed in the 100 m RR3 event and won the silver medal. Solaiman competed at the 2019 World Para Athletics Championships and won the silver medal in the 100 metres RR3 event.

Solaiman competed in the 2021 European Championships and won the gold medal in the 100 m RR3 event.

In June 2023, Solaiman was named to the British team for the 2023 World Para Athletics Championships. There, he won the silver medal in the 100 metres T72 event.
