= Stefan Strobel =

German Paralympic athlete

Medal record

Paralympic athletics

Representing Germany

Paralympic Games
Silver medal – second place	2004 Athens	Marathon - T51

Stefan Strobel is a Paralympic athlete from Germany competing mainly in category T51 marathon events.

Strobel competed in the 200 m and marathon at the 2004 Summer Paralympics winning the silver medal behind Italy's Alvise De Vidi in the Marathon.
