= Kelly Smith (wheelchair racer) =

Canadian Paralympic athlete

Personal information
- Born: 1964 or 1965 (age 61–62) (Note: In 2006, Smith was reported to have turned 41 in April.) Amarillo, Texas, United States

Sport
- Country: Canada
- Sport: Paralympic athletics
- Disability class: T54
Medal record
Paralympic athletics
Representing Canada
Paralympic Games
Silver medal – second place	2004 Athens	Marathon - T54

Kelly Smith (born April 1965) is an American-born Canadian former athlete and pilot. He competed in the T54 category in track and field. Smith has won a gold medal at the 2002 IPC Athletics World Championships and a silver medal at the 2004 Summer Paralympics.

== Early life ==
Smith was born in Amarillo, Texas in April 1965 to a United States Air Force pilot. However, he grew up in British Columbia after his family moved to Kamloops. While he was born without a disability, Smith became paralyzed after falling 15 meters off a cliff while rock climbing in 1991. Prior to the accident, Smith was working as a commercial pilot.

== Career ==
Following his accident, Smith moved to Langley, British Columbia and became a air traffic controller for Nav Canada at Boundary Bay Airport. After spending two years rehabilitiating, Smith began wheelchair racing in 1996. By 1999, Smith had won two consecutive Sun Runs, finished seventh in the Lilac Bloomsday Run, and finished ninth in the Boston Marathon. He was recognized as the province's top wheelchair sport athlete for 1999 but was unable to attend the ceremony as he was competing in the Oz Day 10K Wheelchair Road Race. He qualified for the 2000 Summer Paralympics but failed to medal in the Men's T54 10000 meter marathon.

After making his Paralympics debut, Smith won a gold medal in the Men's 4x400 meter marathon at the 2002 IPC Athletics World Championships and finished third in the 2003 Boston Marathon. By 2004, he had also set numerous Canadian records in the 800m, 5000m, and 10,000m events. Smith qualified for the 2004 Summer Paralympics and won a silver medal in the Men's T54 marathon.
