= Athletics at the 2020 Summer Paralympics – Men's 400 metres T37 =

Men's 400 metres T37 at the XVI Paralympic Games
- Venue: Tokyo National Stadium
- Dates: 1 September 2021 (final)
- Competitors: 6 from 5 nations
- Winning time: 49.34

Medalists
1st place, gold medalist(s)		Andrey Vdovin	RPC
2nd place, silver medalist(s)		Nick Mayhugh	United States
3rd place, bronze medalist(s)		Chermen Kobesov	RPC

The men's 400 metres T37 event at the 2020 Summer Paralympics in Tokyo, took place on 1 September 2021.

The T37 category is for ambulant athletes with cerebral palsy. These athletes have movement and coordination problems on one half of their body. They have good ability in their dominant side of their body (ie hemiplegia).

== Records ==
Prior to the competition, the existing records were as follows:

World Record	Andrey Vdovin (RUS)	50.45	Dubai, United Arab Emirates	9 November 2019
Paralympic Record	Charl du Toit (RSA)	51.13	Rio de Janeiro, Brazil	16 September 2016

Area	Time	Athlete	Nation
Africa	51.00	Charl du Toit	South Africa
America	52.69	Vítor Antônio de Jesus	Brazil
Asia	53.44	Wu Jialong	China
Europe	50.45 WR	Andrey Vdovin	Russia
Oceania	54.37	Brad Scott	Australia

== Results ==
The final took place on 1 September 2021, at 10:40:

Rank	Lane	Name	Nationality	Time	Notes
1st place, gold medalist(s)	7	Andrey Vdovin	RPC	49.34	WR
2nd place, silver medalist(s)	3	Nick Mayhugh	United States	50.26	AR
3rd place, bronze medalist(s)	4	Chermen Kobesov	RPC	50.44	PB
4	6	Michał Kotkowski	Poland	50.60	PB
5	5	Charl du Toit	South Africa	51.14	SB
6	8	Yaroslav Okapinskyi	Ukraine	52.49	PB
