= Sandeep (parathlete) =

Indian para athlete (born 2001)

Personal information
- Nationality: Indian
- Born: 30 September 2001 (age 25)

Sport
- Sport: Para athletics
- Disability class: T44
- Events: 100 metres 200 metres
Medal record
Men's para-athletics
Representing India
World Championships
Bronze medal – third place	2025 New Delhi	200 m T44

Sandeep (born 30 September 2001) is an Indian T44 para athlete who competes in sprinting events.

== Career ==
In August 2025, Sandeep was selected to represent India at the 2025 World Para Athletics Championships. He won the bronze medal in the 200 meters T44 event, which was his first international medal.

At the 2026 Asian Para Games in Nagoya, Sandeep clocked a world record of 52.28 seconds to win gold in the men’s 400m T44 final — breaking the previous world record by over half a second and helping India cross the 100-medal milestone at the Games on the same day.
