= Francesco Loragno =

Italian para athlete (born 2003)

Personal information
- Nationality: Italian
- Born: 22 March 2003 (age 23)

Sport
- Sport: Para athletics
- Disability class: T64
- Event(s): 100 metres 200 metres
Medal record
Men's para-athletics
Representing Italy
World Championships
Bronze medal – third place	2025 New Delhi	200 m T64

Francesco Loragno (born 22 March 2003) is an Italian T64 para athlete who competes in sprinting events.

== Career ==
Loragno competed at the 2024 World Para Athletics Championships in the 100 metres event where he finished in sixth place. He competed in the World Para Athletics Championships the following year and competed in the 100 and 200 metres events, winning a bronze medal in the latter, which was his first international medal.
