= Gavin Drysdale =

British para athlete (born 2000)

Personal information
- Nationality: Scottish
- Born: 1 December 2000 (age 25) Scotland

Sport
- Sport: Para athletics
- Disability: Cerebral palsy
- Disability class: RR3, T72
- Event: 100 metres
Medal record
Men's para-athletics
Representing Great Britain
World Championships
Gold medal – first place	2019 Dubai	100 m RR3
Gold medal – first place	2023 Paris	100 m T72
European Championships
Gold medal – first place	2018 Berlin	100 m RR3

Gavin Drysdale (born 1 December 2000) is a Scottish frame runner who competes in T72 sprint events. He is a two-time World medalist and one-time European medalist.

== Early life ==
Drysdale was born with cerebral palsy. When he was five years of age, he came to discover frame running and quickly took it up.

== Career ==
In July 2018, Drysdale was named to British team for the European Championships. He competed in the 100 m RR3 event and won the gold medal. Drysdale competed at the 2019 World Para Athletics Championships and won the gold medal in the 100 metres RR3 event.

In June 2023, Drysdale was named to the British team for the 2023 World Para Athletics Championships. There, he won the gold medal in the 100 metres T72 event.

== Personal life ==
Besides his athletic career, Drysdale is also a Project Officer at World Abilitysport.
