= 2012 IPC Athletics European Championships – Men's 400 metres =

The men's 400 metres at the 2012 IPC Athletics European Championships was held at Stadskanaal Stadium from 24 to 28 July.

== Medalists ==
Results given by IPC Athletics.

Class	Gold	Silver	Bronze
T12	Luis Goncalves; Portugal	Semih Deniz; Turkey	Rodolfo Alves; Portugal
T36	Evgenii Shvetcov; Russia	Paul Blake; United Kingdom	Artem Arefyev; Russia
T38	Roman Kapranov; Russia	Andriy Onufriyenko; Ukraine	Aliaksandr Pankou; Belarus
T46	Antonis Aresti; Cyprus	Alexey Kotlov; Russia	Samuele Gobbi; Italy
T53	Roger Puigbo Verdaguer; Spain	Sergey Shilov; Russia	Edison Kasumaj; Switzerland
T54	Kenny van Weeghel; Netherlands	Leo Pekka Tahti; Finland	Alexey Bychenok; Russia

== Results ==
=== T12 ===
Heats

Rank	Heat	Sport Class	Name	Nationality	Time	Notes
1	1	T12	Luis Goncalves	Portugal	51.23	Q
2	1	T12	Semih Deniz	Turkey	52.14	q, SB
3	1	T12	Rodolfo Alves	Portugal	52.42	q, SB
—	2	T12	Gerard Desgarrega Puigdevall	Spain	DQ	
—	2	T12	Mustafa Kucuk	Turkey	DQ	
—	2	T12	Mehmet Nesim Oner	Turkey	DQ	

Final

Rank	Sport Class	Name	Nationality	Time	Notes
1st place, gold medalist(s)	T12	Luis Goncalves	Portugal	50.83	
2nd place, silver medalist(s)	T12	Semih Deniz	Turkey	52.77	
3rd place, bronze medalist(s)	T12	Rodolfo Alves	Portugal	53.62	

=== T36 ===
Heats

Rank	Heat	Sport Class	Name	Nationality	Time	Notes
1	2	T36	Paul Blake	United Kingdom	56.43	Q, SB
2	1	T36	Evgenii Shvetcov	Russia	56.98	Q
3	2	T36	Artem Arefyev	Russia	1:00.60	Q
4	2	T36	Jose Manuel Gonzalez	Spain	1:01.01	q
5	2	T36	Jose Pampano	Spain	1:02.72	q
6	1	T36	Angel Perez Galan	Spain	1:04.13	Q
7	1	T36	Andrey Zhirnov	Russia	DQ	
8	1	T36	Aliaksandr Daniliuk	Belarus	DQ	

Final

Rank	Sport Class	Name	Nationality	Time	Notes
1st place, gold medalist(s)	T36	Evgenii Shvetcov	Russia	54.93	
2nd place, silver medalist(s)	T36	Paul Blake	United Kingdom	55.30	SB
3rd place, bronze medalist(s)	T36	Artem Arefyev	Russia	56.77	SB
4	T36	Jose Manuel Gonzalez	Spain	1:01.08	
5	T36	Jose Pampano	Spain	1:03.07	
6	T36	Angel Perez Galan	Spain	1:03.54	

=== T38 ===
Final

Rank	Sport Class	Name	Nationality	Time	Notes
1st place, gold medalist(s)	T37	Roman Kapranov	Russia	54.33	
2nd place, silver medalist(s)	T38	Andriy Onufriyenko	Ukraine	54.83	
3rd place, bronze medalist(s)	T38	Aliaksandr Pankou	Belarus	57.61	
—	T37	Alexandr Lyashchenko	Russia	DNF	
—	T38	Moussa Tambadou	France	DQ	

=== T46 ===
Final

Rank	Sport Class	Name	Nationality	Time	Notes
1st place, gold medalist(s)	T46	Antonis Aresti	Cyprus	50.55	
2nd place, silver medalist(s)	T46	Alexey Kotlov	Russia	51.42	SB
3rd place, bronze medalist(s)	T46	Samuele Gobbi	Italy	51.94	SB
—	T46	Yury Nosulenko	Russia	DQ	

=== T53 ===
Final

Rank	Sport Class	Name	Nationality	Time	Notes
1st place, gold medalist(s)	T53	Roger Puigbo Verdaguer	Spain	54.91	
2nd place, silver medalist(s)	T53	Sergey Shilov	Russia	55.50	
3rd place, bronze medalist(s)	T53	Edison Kasumaj	Switzerland	57.13	
—	T53	Korsan Vogel	Germany	DNS	

=== T54 ===
Final

Rank	Sport Class	Name	Nationality	Time	Notes
1st place, gold medalist(s)	T0	Kenny van Weeghel	Netherlands	48.84	
2nd place, silver medalist(s)	T0	Leo Pekka Tahti	Finland	49.44	
3rd place, bronze medalist(s)	T0	Alexey Bychenok	Russia	50.58	
4	T0	Niklas Almers	Sweden	55.20	
—	T0	Marc Schuh	Germany	DQ	

== See also ==
- List of IPC world records in athletics
