= Walid Ktila =

Tunisian Paralympic athlete (born 1985)

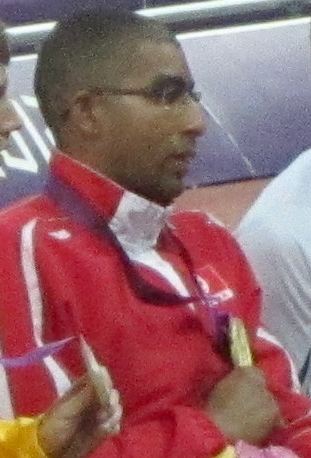
- Ktila at the 2012 Paralympics

Personal information
- Native name: وليد كتيلة
- Born: Walid Ktila; 20 July 1985 (age 40)
- Years active: 2003–present
- Weight: 63 kg (139 lb)

Sport
- Sport: Paralympic athletics
- Disability: cerebral palsy
- Disability class: T34
- Event: 100–800 m
- Club: Tunisian Federation of Sports for the Disabled: Gabès, TUN
- Coached by: Hedi Najah
Medal record
Men's para athletics
Representing Tunisia
Paralympic Games
Gold medal – first place	2012 London	200 m T34
Gold medal – first place	2012 London	100 m T34
Gold medal – first place	2016 Rio	100 m T34
Gold medal – first place	2020 Tokyo	100 m T34
Gold medal – first place	2020 Tokyo	800 m T34
Silver medal – second place	2016 Rio	800 m T34
Silver medal – second place	2024 Paris	100 m T34
World Championships
Gold medal – first place	2013 Lyon	100 m T34
Gold medal – first place	2013 Lyon	200 m T34
Gold medal – first place	2013 Lyon	400 m T34
Gold medal – first place	2013 Lyon	800 m T34
Gold medal – first place	2015 Doha	100 m T34
Gold medal – first place	2015 Doha	200 m T34
Gold medal – first place	2015 Doha	400 m T34
Gold medal – first place	2015 Doha	800 m T34
Gold medal – first place	2017 London	100 m T34
Gold medal – first place	2017 London	200 m T34
Gold medal – first place	2017 London	400 m T34
Gold medal – first place	2017 London	800 m T34
Gold medal – first place	2019 Dubai	100 m T34
Gold medal – first place	2019 Dubai	400 m T34
Gold medal – first place	2023 Paris	800 m T34
Gold medal – first place	2024 Kobe	100 m T34
Silver medal – second place	2024 Kobe	400 m T34
Silver medal – second place	2024 Kobe	800 m T34
Bronze medal – third place	2023 Paris	100 m T34

Walid Ktila (Arabic: وليد كتيلة; born 20 July 1985) is a Paralympic wheelchair racer from Tunisia who competes in short and middle distances in the T34 category. He won all 100–800 m events at the 2013, 2015 and 2017 world championships. At the 2012 and 2016 Paralympics he won three gold and one silver medal.

== World records ==
Walid holds two IPC world records in athletics in 100 m and 200 m T34 events.

Event	Record	Competition	Location	Date
100 m	15.69 (+0.1 m/s)		Kuwait City, Kuwait	17 January 2012
200 m	27.98 (−0.3 m/s)	Paralympic Games	London, Great Britain	4 September 2012

== See also ==
- Tunisia at the Paralympics
