= Semih Deniz =

Turkish Paralympic athlete (born 1989)

Personal information
- Born: 5 January 1989 (age 37)
- Years active: 2006–

Sport
- Sport: Para-athletics
- Club: Çankaya Belediyesi SK
Medal record
Para-athletics
Representing Turkey
Paralympics
| Bronze medal – third place | 2016 Rio de Janeiro | 1500m T11 |
IPC Athletics World Championships
| Bronze medal – third place | 2013 Lyon | 1500m T12 |
IPC Athletics European Championships
| Gold medal – first place | 2016 Grosseto | 1500m T11 |
| Silver medal – second place | 2014 Swansea | 400m T11 |
| Gold medal – first place | 2014 Swansea | 1500m T11 |
| Silver medal – second place | 2012 Stadskanaal | 400m T12 |

Semih Deniz (born 5 January 1989) is a Turkish Paralympics medalist middle distance runner competing in the T11, T12 and T13 class.

Semih Deniz began his sporting career in 2006. He competes for Çankaya Belediyesi SK in Ankara.

Deniz competed at the 2012 IPC Athletics European Championships held in Stadskanaal, Netherlands and won the silver medal in the 400m T12 event. The same year, he represented his country at the 2012 Paralympics in London, United Kingdom competing in the 400m T12, 800m T12, and 1500m T13 events.

In 2013, he took the bronze medal in the 1500m T12 event at the 2013 IPC Athletics World Championships in Lyon, France.

Deniz captured the silver medal in the 400m T11 event and the gold medal in the 1500m T11 event at the 2014 IPC Athletics European Championships in Swansea, Wales, United Kingdom.

In 2016, he took the gold medal in the 1500m T11 event at the 2016 IPC Athletics European Championships in Grosseto, Italy.

He won the bronze medal in the 1500m T11 event at the 2016 Paralympics in Rio de Janeiro, Brazil.
