= Athletics at the 2016 Summer Paralympics – Men's 100 metres T34 =

Men's 100 metres T34 at the XV Paralympic Games
- Venue: Estádio Olímpico João Havelange
- Dates: 11–12 September 2016
- Competitors: 10 from 10 nations

Medalists
1st place, gold medalist(s)		Walid Ktila	Tunisia
2nd place, silver medalist(s)		Rheed McCracken	Australia
3rd place, bronze medalist(s)		Henry Manni	Finland

The T34 category is for wheelchair athletes with cerebral palsy. Athletes in this category have minimal limitations or control problems in their arms and trunk while pushing a wheelchair.

The Athletics at the 2016 Summer Paralympics – Men's 100 metres T34 event at the 2016 Paralympic Games took place on 11–12 September 2016, at the Estádio Olímpico João Havelange.

== Heats ==
=== Heat 1 ===
17:46 11 September 2016:

Rank	Lane	Bib	Name	Nationality	Reaction	Time	Notes
1	4	1057	Rheed McCracken	Australia		15.50	Q
2	3	1212	Austin Smeenk	Canada		16.03	Q
3	5	2181	Bojan Mitic	Switzerland		16.10	Q
4	7	1474	Sebastien Mobre	France		16.70	q
5	6	2368	Austin Pruitt	United States		17.34	

=== Heat 2 ===
17:52 11 September 2016:

Rank	Lane	Bib	Name	Nationality	Reaction	Time	Notes
1	5	2277	Walid Ktila	Tunisia		15.44	Q
2	7	1456	Henry Manni	Finland		15.78	Q
3	3	2300	Mohamed Alhammadi	United Arab Emirates		15.82	Q
4	6	2066	Mohammed Rashid A J Al-Kubaisi	Qatar		16.45	q
5	4	1518	Ben Rowlings	Great Britain		17.30	

== Final ==
18:38 12 September 2016:

Rank	Lane	Bib	Name	Nationality	Reaction	Time	Notes
1st place, gold medalist(s)	4	2277	Walid Ktila	Tunisia		15.14	
2nd place, silver medalist(s)	5	1057	Rheed McCracken	Australia		15.34	
3rd place, bronze medalist(s)	3	1456	Henry Manni	Finland		15.46	
4	7	2300	Mohamed Alhammadi	United Arab Emirates		15.76	
5	8	2181	Bojan Mitic	Switzerland		15.87	
6	6	1212	Austin Smeenk	Canada		16.21	
7	1	1474	Sebastien Mobre	France		16.47	
8	2	2066	Mohammed Rashid A J Al-Kubaisi	Qatar		16.68	
