= 2024 World Para Athletics Championships – Men's 800 metres =

The men's 800 metres at the 2024 World Para Athletics Championships were held in Kobe.

== Medalists ==
Event	Gold	Silver	Bronze
T34	Wang Yang; China	Walid Ktila; Tunisia	Gong Wenhao; China
T53	Pierre Fairbank; France	Mohamed Nidhal Khelifi; Tunisia	Yoo Byung-hoon; South Korea
T54	Dai Yunqiang; China	Hu Yang; China	Nathan Maguire; Great Britain

== T34 ==
The event final took place on 25 May.

Rank	Lane	Name	Nationality	Time	Notes
1st place, gold medalist(s)	6	Wang Yang	China	1:36.50	
2nd place, silver medalist(s)	7	Walid Ktila	Tunisia	1:36.64	AF
3rd place, bronze medalist(s)	8	Gong Wenhao	China	1:42.81	
4	9	Henry Manni	Finland	1:43.12	SB
5	3	Atsuro Kobata	Japan	1:47.29	
6	5	Roberto Michel	Mauritius	1:47.48	
7	2	Mohamad Othman	United Arab Emirates	1:47.81	
8	4	Ahmed Nawad	United Arab Emirates	2:13.54	

== T53 ==
The event final took place on 23 May.

Rank	Lane	Name	Nationality	Time	Notes
1st place, gold medalist(s)	6	Pierre Fairbank	France	1:43.80	
2nd place, silver medalist(s)	7	Mohamed Nidhal Khelifi	Tunisia	1:44.02	AF
3rd place, bronze medalist(s)	8	Yoo Byung-hoon	South Korea	1:44.74	SB
4	5	Moatez Jomni	Great Britain	1:46.50	

== T54 ==
The event final took place on 25 May.

Rank	Lane	Name	Nationality	Time	Notes
1st place, gold medalist(s)	4	Dai Yunqiang	China	1:34.59	
2nd place, silver medalist(s)	8	Hu Yang	China	1:34.97	SB
3rd place, bronze medalist(s)	6	Nathan Maguire	Great Britain	1:35.27	
4	7	Faisal Alrajehi	Kuwait	1:35.30	
5	5	Saichon Konjen	Thailand	1:36.23	
6	2	Ma Zhuo	China	1:36.23	SB
7	3	Samuel Rizzo	Australia	1:36.76	
8	9	Phiphatphong Sianglam	Thailand	1:36.81	
9	1	Luke Bailey	Australia	1:38.36	SB
