= Vinicius Marques =

Brazilian football coach

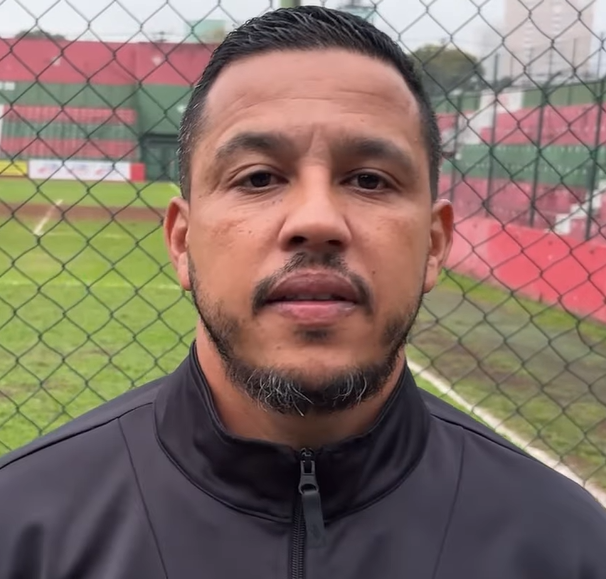
- Marques in 2025

Personal information
- Full name: Vinicius Marques Oliveira
- Date of birth: 14 February 1984 (age 42)
- Place of birth: São Paulo, Brazil

Team information
- Current team: Santos (assistant)

Managerial career
- Years: Team
- 2012–2014: Corinthians U11
- 2015: Corinthians U13
- 2016: Corinthians U15
- 2017–2019: Corinthians U15 (assistant)
- 2019: Corinthians U15
- 2019–2020: Corinthians U20 (assistant)
- 2021–2022: Corinthians U16
- 2023: Corinthians U17 (assistant)
- 2024: Corinthians U20 (assistant)
- 2025: Ibrachina U17
- 2025: Santos (assistant)
- 2025–2026: Santos U20
- 2026–: Santos (assistant)

Vinicius Marques Oliveira (born 14 February 1984) is a Brazilian football coach. He is the current assistant coach of Santos.

== Career ==
Born in São Paulo, Marques began his career in 2008, being a coach in Corinthians' youth schools named Chute Inicial. He fully joined the club's structure in 2011, as a technical evaluator, and subsequently coached their under-11, under-13, under-15 and under-16 squads.

In 2023, Marques became an assistant of Guilherme Dalla Déa at Timão's under-17 team, before moving to the under-20s under the same role in the following year. On 20 June 2024, after Danilo was dismissed, he also left the club after a 15-year spell.

On 6 October 2024, Marques joined Ibrachina as head coach of the under-17 team. He left the club the following 29 April, joining Cleber Xavier at Santos as his assistant.

Marques remained at Santos even after Xavier's dismissal on 17 August 2025, and was confirmed as head coach of the under-20 team five days later. He led the side to the Campeonato Paulista Sub-20 title at the end of the year, before returning to his assistant role in the first team on 24 March 2026.

== Honours ==
Santos U20

- Campeonato Paulista Sub-20: 2025
