= Lione =

Lione is both an Italian surname and a given name. Notable people with the name include:

- Fabio Lione (born 1973), Italian singer
- Riccardo Lione (born 1972), Italian beach volleyball player
- Lione Pascoli (1674–1744), Italian abbot, art historian, collector and economist
