= Wang Yang (wheelchair racer) =

Chinese paralympic wheelchair racer

Personal information
- Native name: 王洋
- Born: 22 May 2003 (age 23) Guangdong, China

Sport
- Country: China
- Sport: Para-athletics
- Disability class: T34
Medal record
Representing China
Para-athletics
Paralympic Games
Bronze medal – third place	2020 Tokyo	800 m T34
World Championships
Gold medal – first place	2024 Kobe	800 m T34
Gold medal – first place	2025 New Delhi	800 m T34
Asian Para Games
Bronze medal – third place	2022 Hangzhou	800 m T34

Wang Yang ( Chinese: 王洋)(born 22 May 2003) is a Chinese paralympic wheelchair racer. He competed at the 2020 Summer Paralympics, winning the bronze medal in the men's 800 metres T34 event with a time of 1:45.68.
