= Maxcel Amo Manu =

Italian Paralympic athlete (born 1992)

Personal information
- Nationality: Italian
- Born: 28 February 1992 (age 34) Kumasi, Ghana
- Home town: Bologna, Italy

Sport
- Sport: Para-athletics
- Disability class: T64
- Event(s): 100 metres 200 metres
Medal record
Para-athletics
Representing Italy
Paralympic Games
Silver medal – second place	2024 Paris	100 m T64
World Championships
Gold medal – first place	2023 Paris	100 m T64
Gold medal – first place	2023 Paris	200 m T64

Maxcel Amo Manu (born 28 February 1992) is an Italian T64 Paralympic sprint runner. He represented Italy at the 2024 Summer Paralympics.

== Early life ==
Manu was born and raised in Ghana, and moved to Italy when he was 11 years old. In 2017, he was involved in a motorcycle accident when his left leg was caught in the guardrail. As a result, he became a below-the-knee amputee.

== Career ==
Manu represented Italy at the 2023 World Para Athletics Championships and won gold medals in the 100 metres and 200 metres events.
