= Isaac Towers =

British Paralympic athlete

Personal information
- Nationality: British
- Born: 1 October 1998 (age 28) Blackpool, England

Sport
- Country: Great Britain
- Sport: Athletics
- Disability class: T34
- Event: Sprint
- Club: Kirby AC
- Coached by: Peter Wyman

Achievements and titles
- Personal bests: 100m: 16.90s 200m: 29.69s 400m: 54.18s 800m: 1:44.67; 1500m: 3:21.14
Medal record
Men's Paralympic athletics
Representing Great Britain
World Championships
Bronze medal – third place	2017 London	800 m T34
European Championships
Gold medal – first place	2016 Grosseto	800 m T34
Silver medal – second place	2014 Swansea	800 m T34
Silver medal – second place	2016 Grosseto	400 m T34
Bronze medal – third place	2014 Swansea	400 m T34
Bronze medal – third place	2016 Grosseto	200 m T34

Isaac Towers (born 1 October 1998) is a Paralympian athlete from England competing in category T34 sprint and middle-distance events. Towers won gold and became the European champion in the 800m (T34) event in 2016, qualifying for the Summer Paralympics in Rio.

== Early life ==
Towers was born in 1998 in Lancashire, England. He was educated at Saint Michael's on Wyre Primary School and King Edward VII and Queen Mary School, before attending Cardinal Newman College where he studied business. He has cerebral palsy.

== Athletics career ==
Towers was introduced to wheelchair athletics in 2010 after being introduced to the sport by para-athletics coach Ian Thompson. By 2011, he was classified as a T34 classification athlete and was competing at regional competitions. In 2013 he wanted to enter the World Championships in Lyon, but at 14 he was under the minimum age requirement. That year he was named as a nominee for the BBC Young Sports Personality of the Year.

In 2014 Towers entered his first IPC Grand Prix, travelling to Nottwil in Switzerland to compete in the ParAthletics meet. A month later, in June, he traveled to the United States to compete at the Indianapolis International. In August he was selected for the Great Britain team for the 2014 IPC Athletics European Championships where he entered four events, the 100m, 200m, 400m and 800m (T34) events. In the 100m and 200m, Towers qualified for the finals but did not medal. In his favoured longer distance races Towers finished third in the 400m and second in the 800m, earning his first major international medals.

At the 2015 IPC Athletics World Championships Towers raced in the 200m, 400m and 800m events. He failed to qualify for the 200m final, and finished outside the medal places in both the 400m (6th) and 800m (6th). The following year, in the buildup to the 2016 Summer Paralympics in Rio, Towers competed at the European Championships in Grosseto. He finished fourth in the 100m, but took the full sweep of medals in his other three events. He took bronze in the 200m sprint, behind Russia's Sebastien Mobre and eventual winner Henry Manni. In the 400m he won silver, again behind his main rival Manni. The 800m race saw Towers win his first major international gold medal recording a championship record of 1:44.67. More importantly it saw him beat Manni, who finished second despite posting a personal best. Following his performance in Grosseto, Towers was selected for the Great Britain athletics team for the 2016 Summer Paralympics in the 800m T34.

At the 2017 World Para Athletics Championships, Towers won a bronze medal in the T34 800m and came 7th in the T34 400m.

At the 2019 World Para Athletics Championships, he placed 6th in the 800m and 7th in the 400m.

At the delayed 2020 Summer Paralympics, he came 7th in the T34 800 metres.

In the 2024 Summer Paralympics he came 6th in the T34 800 metres.
