= Marco Cicchetti =

Italian para athlete (born 1999)

Personal information
- Nationality: Italian
- Born: 11 April 1999 (age 27) Rome

Sport
- Sport: Para athletics
- Disability: Clubfoot
- Disability class: T44
- Events: 100 metres 200 metres long jump
Medal record
Men's para-athletics
Representing Italy
World Championships
Gold medal – first place	2025 New Delhi	Long jump T44
Gold medal – first place	2025 New Delhi	200 m T44
Bronze medal – third place	2025 New Delhi	100 m T44
European Championships
Bronze medal – third place	2021 Bydgoszcz	Long jump T64

Marco Cicchetti (born 11 April 1999) is an Italian T44 para athlete. He represented Italy at the 2020 and 2024 Summer Paralympics.

== Career ==
Cicchetti represented Italy at the 2020 Summer Paralympics and finished in sixth place in the long jump T44 event. He then competed at the 2021 World Para Athletics European Championships and won a bronze medal in the long jump T64 event. He again represented Italy at the 2024 Summer Paralympics and finished in eighth place in the long jump T44 and 100 metres T44 events.

In June 2025, he competed at the World Para Athletics Grand Prix in Paris, France, and set the European record in the 200 meters T44 event with a time of 23.01 seconds. In September 2025, he competed at the 2025 World Para Athletics Championships and won a gold medal in the long jump T44 event with a European record jump of 6.98 metres. He also won a gold medal in the 200 metres T44 event, and a bronze medal in the 100 metres T44 event.

== Personal life ==
Cicchetti was born with a clubfoot.
