= Alvise De Vidi =

Italian Paralympic athlete (born 1966)

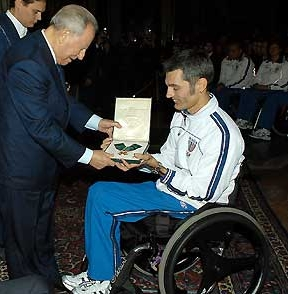
- Alvise De Vidi receives award from the former Italian President, Carlo Azeglio Ciampi

Personal information
- Nationality: Italian
- Born: April 30, 1966 (age 60) San Biagio di Callalta, Italy

Sport
- Sport: Paralympic athletics Paralympic swimming
- Club: ASPEA Padova; G.S. Fiamme Azzurre
Medal record
Event	1st	2nd	3rd
Paralympic Games	7	3	5
World Para Athletics Championships	3	5	4
World Para Swimming Championships	2	0	0
European Para Athletics Championships	3	3	3
Total	15	11	12
Paralympic Games
Swimming
Gold medal – first place	1988 Seoul	25 metres butterfly - 1A
Athletics
Gold medal – first place	1996 Atlanta	400 metres - T50
Gold medal – first place	1996 Atlanta	800 metres - T50
Gold medal – first place	2000 Sydney	800 metres - T51
Gold medal – first place	2000 Sydney	1500 metres - T51
Gold medal – first place	2000 Sydney	Marathon - T51
Gold medal – first place	2004 Athens	Marathon - T51
Silver medal – second place	1996 Atlanta	1500 metres - T50
Silver medal – second place	2000 Sydney	400 metres - T51
Silver medal – second place	2012 London	100 metres - T51
Bronze medal – third place	1988 Seoul	4x100 m Relay 1A-1C
Bronze medal – third place	1992 Barcelona	800 metres - TW1
Bronze medal – third place	2000 Sydney	200 metres - T51
Bronze medal – third place	2004 Athens	200 metres - T51
Bronze medal – third place	2016 Rio	400 metres - T51

Alvise De Vidi (born 30 April 1966, in San Biagio di Callalta) is a former paralympic athlete from Italy competing mainly in category T51 wheelchair racing events.

== Biography ==
Alvise has competed in 6 Paralympics across two sports winning 15 medals seven of them gold. His first games were in 1988 Summer Paralympics where he competed in the 25m Butterfly class 1A winning the gold medal, despite winning a gold medal this would prove to be the only time he competed outside of athletics. In the same games he also competed in seven track events ranging from 100m to 1500m including both the relays and it was in the 4 × 100 m that he won a bronze medal. In the 1992 Summer Paralympics he competed in the 100m, 400m, 800m and 1500m winning the bronze in the 800m.

At the 1996 Summer Paralympics proved to be a much more successful year when he won the 400m and 800m gold medals, silver in the 1500m and competed in the marathon. At the 2000 Summer Paralympics he achieved more success with a defence of his 800m gold medal and further gold medals in the 1500m and marathon as well as silver in 400m and bronze in the 200m. 2004 Summer Paralympics were to be his last but he managed to defend his marathon title and win a second consecutive bronze over 200m.

== Achievements ==
Year	Competition	Venue	Event	Rank
Para swimming
1988	Paralympic Games	(South Korea) Seoul	25 m butterfly	1st
Para athletics
1992	Paralympics Games	(Spain) Barcelona	800 m	3rd
1994	European Championships	(Finland) Helsinki	200 m	3rd
1996	Paralympics Games	(United States) Atlanta	1500 m	2nd
1996	Paralympics Games	(United States) Atlanta	400 m	1st
1996	Paralympics Games	(United States) Atlanta	800 m	1st
1998	World Championships	(United Kingdom) Birmingham	200 m	3rd
1998	World Championships	(United Kingdom) Birmingham	400 m	2nd
1998	World Championships	(United Kingdom) Birmingham	800 m	2nd
1998	World Championships	(United Kingdom) Birmingham	Marathon	2nd
2000	Paralympics Games	(Australia) Sydney	200 m	3rd
2000	Paralympics Games	(Australia) Sydney	400 m	2nd
2000	Paralympics Games	(Australia) Sydney	800 m	1st
2000	Paralympics Games	(Australia) Sydney	1500 m	1st
2000	Paralympics Games	(Australia) Sydney	Marathon	1st
2002	World Championships	(France) Lille	400 m	3rd
2002	World Championships	(France) Lille	800 m	1st
2002	World Championships	(France) Lille	1500 m	2nd
2002	World Championships	(France) Lille	Marathon	1st
2003	European Championships	(Netherlands) Assen	400 m	2nd
2003	European Championships	(Netherlands) Assen	800 m	3rd
2003	European Championships	(Netherlands) Assen	1500 m	1st
2004	Paralympics Games	(Greece) Athens	200 m	3rd
2004	Paralympics Games	(Greece) Athens	Marathon	1st
2012	Paralympics Games	(United Kingdom) London	100 m	2nd
2013	World Championships	(France) Lione	100 m	3rd
2013	World Championships	(France) Lione	200 m	3rd
2014	European Championships	(United Kingdom) Swansea	400 m	3rd
2016	European Championships	(Italy) Grosseto	400 m	2nd
2016	Paralympics Games	(Brazil) Rio de Janeiro	400 m	3rd

== See also ==
- Italy at the Paralympics - Multiple medallists
