= Cody Fournie =

Canadian para-athlete

Personal information
- Born: August 20, 1989 (age 36)
- Home town: Rimbey, Alberta, Canada

Sport
- Country: Canada
- Sport: Para-athletics
- Disability class: T51
- Event: 200 metres
- Coached by: Geoff Harris
Medal record
Men's para-athletics
Representing Canada
Paralympic Games
Gold medal – first place	2024 Paris	100 m T51
Gold medal – first place	2024 Paris	200 m T51

Cody Fournie (born August 20, 1989) is a Canadian para-athlete. He won a gold medal at the 2024 Summer Paralympics in the men's 200 m T51 event.
