= Toni Piispanen =

Finnish Paralympic athlete

Personal information
- Nationality: Finnish
- Born: 24 July 1976 (age 49)

Sport
- Sport: Para-athletics; Wheelchair rugby
- Disability class: T51
- Club: Espoon Tapiot
- Coached by: Jari Nordblom; Heini Sistonen; Teemu Janhunen; Marko Hyytiäinen; Rauno Saunavaara
Medal record
Men's para-athletics
Representing Finland
Paralympic Games
Gold medal – first place	2012 London	100 m T51
Gold medal – first place	2020 Tokyo	200 m T51
Silver medal – second place	2020 Tokyo	100 m T51
Silver medal – second place	2024 Paris	200 m T51
Bronze medal – third place	2024 Paris	100 m T51
World Championships
Gold medal – first place	2013 Lyon	100 m T51
Gold medal – first place	2019 Dubai	100 m T51
Silver medal – second place	2011 Christchurch	100 m T51
Silver medal – second place	2013 Lyon	200 m T51
Silver medal – second place	2015 Doha	100 m T51
Silver medal – second place	2017 London	100 m T51
Silver medal – second place	2019 Dubai	200 m T51
Silver medal – second place	2023 Paris	200 m T51
Bronze medal – third place	2011 Christchurch	200 m T51
Bronze medal – third place	2015 Doha	400 m T51
Bronze medal – third place	2023 Paris	100 m T51
European Championships
Gold medal – first place	2014 Swansea	100 m T51
Gold medal – first place	2014 Swansea	400 m T51
Gold medal – first place	2021 Bydgoszcz	100 m T51
Silver medal – second place	2016 Grosseto	100 m T51
Silver medal – second place	2018 Berlin	100 m T51
Silver medal – second place	2018 Berlin	200 m T51
Silver medal – second place	2021 Bydgoszcz	200 m T51
Bronze medal – third place	2016 Grosseto	400 m T51

Toni Piispanen (born 24 July 1976) is a Finnish Paralympic athlete.

== Career ==
He started as an able-bodied karate competitor and became disabled due to an accident that injured his spinal cord at a karate show in 1993. This accident occurred in Lahti in front of hundreds of spectators. After that he played Wheelchair rugby for fifteen years before switching to wheelchair racing in 2008. He is a world record holder in his classification. At the 2012 Summer Paralympics he won gold in the men's T-51 class 100-metre wheelchair sprint.
