= Roger Habsch =

Belgian Paralympic athlete (born 1979)

Personal information
- Nationality: Belgian
- Born: 5 January 1979 (age 47) Verviers, Belgium

Sport
- Sport: Paralympic athletics
- Disability class: T51
- Event: Sprints
- Club: RFC Liege
- Coached by: Pascal Henkinbrant
Medal record
Men's para-athletics
Representing Belgium
Paralympic Games
Bronze medal – third place	2020 Tokyo	100 m T51
Bronze medal – third place	2020 Tokyo	200 m T51
World Championships
Gold medal – first place	2023 Paris	200 m T51
Gold medal – first place	2024 Kobe	100 m T51
Gold medal – first place	2024 Kobe	200 m T51
Silver medal – second place	2023 Paris	100 m T51
Silver medal – second place	2025 New Delhi	100 m T51
Silver medal – second place	2025 New Delhi	200 m T51

Roger Habsch (born 5 January 1979) is a Belgian para-athlete who specializes in sprints. He represented Belgium at the 2020 Summer Paralympics.

== Career ==
Habsch represented Belgium in the men's 100 metres T51 and 200 metres T51 events at the 2020 Summer Paralympics and won a bronze medal in both. Shortly before the 100 metres race, his chair was found damaged in a suspected act of sabotage.
