= Mohamed Alhammadi (athlete) =

UAE sprinter (born 1991)

Mohamed Alhamaddi
Personal information
- Nationality: UAE
- Born: Mohamed Alhamaddi; 2 August 1991 (age 35)

Sport
- Sport: Track and Field
- Event: 100m

Mohamed Alhammadi (born 2 August 1991) is an Olympic athlete from the UAE.

At the Athletics at the 2020 Summer Olympics – Men's 100 metres second preliminary race, Alhammadi ran a personal best time of 10.59 seconds to qualify for the heats.
