= Stephen Osborne (athlete) =

British Paralympic athlete (born 1963)

Personal information
- Nationality: British
- Born: 26 March 1963 (age 63) Longfield, England

Sport
- Country: Great Britain
- Sport: Athletics
- Event: Sprint

Achievements and titles
- Paralympic finals: 2012
Medal record
Track and field (athletics)
Representing Great Britain
IPC Athletics European Championships
Bronze medal – third place	2014 Swansea	100 m T51
Bronze medal – third place	2016 Grosseto	100 m T51

Stephen Osborne (born 26 March 1963) is a Paralympian athlete from England competing in category T51 sprinting events. Osborne qualified for the 2012 Summer Paralympics in the 100m sprint. In 2014 he took the bronze medal at the European Championships in Swansea.

== Personal history ==
Osborne was born in Longfield, England in 1963. After leaving school Osborne planned to become a carpenter, but a car accident at the age of 19 resulted in him breaking his neck.
