= Édgar Navarro (Paralympian) =

Mexican Paralympic athlete (born 1971)

Personal information
- Full name: Édgar Cesáreo Navarro Sánchez
- Born: 21 May 1971 (age 55) Nezahualcóyotl, Mexico

Sport
- Sport: Para-athletics
- Event: T51 races
Medal record
Men's para-athletics
Representing Mexico
Paralympic Games
Gold medal – first place	2004 Athens	200 m – T51
Silver medal – second place	2016 Rio	400 m – T51
Bronze medal – third place	2004 Athens	Marathon – T51
World Championships
Gold medal – first place	2002 Lille	400m T51
Gold medal – first place	2011 Christchurch	100m T51
Gold medal – first place	2011 Christchurch	200m T51
Gold medal – first place	2013 Lyon	200m T51
Bronze medal – third place	1998 Birmingham	100m T51
Bronze medal – third place	2024 Kobe	100m T51
Bronze medal – third place	2024 Kobe	200m T51
Bronze medal – third place	2025 New Delhi	100m T51
Bronze medal – third place	2025 New Delhi	200m T51

Édgar Cesáreo Navarro Sánchez (born 21 May 1971) is a Paralympic athlete from Mexico competing mainly in category T51 wheelchair racing events.

== Career ==
Navarro has competed in four Paralympics across two sports. His first sport was athletics where he competed in the 2000 Summer Paralympics as a T51 athlete in 200m, 400m and 800m. In 2004 he won the 200m and a bronze medal in the marathon before in 2008 moving to cycling where he competed in the individual time trial for hand cycles class A. In 2012 he appeared in his fourth Paralympics where he finished fourth in the T51 100m sprint at London.

Four years later he eared two medals in Rio 2016: One silver in 400 meters and one bronze in 100 meters.

At the delayed 2020 Summer Paralympics, held in Tokyo, Navarro was disqualified from the heats in the 400 metres T52. He also finished 5th in both the 100 and 200 metres.

At the 2024 Summer Paralympics, held in Paris, Navarro finished 5th in the T51 100 metres, and 6th in the 200 metres.

== Political career ==
From 2009 to 2012 Navarro served as Mayor of his hometown Nezahualcoyotl, Mexico. His motivation behind running for Mayor was to further equality in Mexico. During his political career, he supported increased protections for children and the elderly.

== Personal life ==
Not much is known about Navarro's personal life. At an early age, Navarro was heavily involved in sports like boxing, and soccer. At the age of 21 Navarro was robbed at gun point and shot in the neck. His injuries left him unable to walk. 5 years after his robbery, Navarro stumbled upon 2 Mexican athletes participating in a wheelchair racing event. Since, Navarro has participated in several Paralympic events.

Navarro has 2 children. During the 2020 COVID quarantine, his daughter Lluvia Navarro Aragon assisted with his training.
