= Mohamed Berrahal =

Algerian Paralympic athlete

Personal information
- Nationality: Algerian
- Born: Mohamed Berrahal; May 24, 1979 (age 47) El Harrach, Algiers, Algeria

Sport
- Country: Algeria
- Sport: Athletics
- Disability class: T/F51
- Events: 100 metres 200 metres 400 metres discus throw

Achievements and titles
- Paralympic finals: London 2012: Javelin throw
Medal record
Men's Athletics
Paralympic Games
Gold medal – first place	2012 London	Discus F51-53
Bronze medal – third place	2012 London	100m T51
Silver medal – second place	2016 Rio de Janeiro	200m T51
World Championships
Gold medal – first place	2013 Lyon	Discus F51-53
Silver medal – second place	2013 Lyon	100m T51
Silver medal – second place	2024 Kobe	200m T51
Bronze medal – third place	2015 Doha	100m T51

Mohamed Berrahal (born 24 May 1979) is an Algerian athlete who competes in disability athletics in the T/F51 category.

== Career ==
Berrahal broke the world record in the F51 category to become the Paralympic Champion in London. At the 2013 World Championships he broke his own world record as he won a combined F51–53 event in the discus.
