= Athletics at the 2020 Summer Paralympics – Men's 800 metres =

The Men's 800m athletics events for the 2020 Summer Paralympics took place at the Tokyo National Stadium from September 2 to September 4, 2021. A total of 3 events were contested over this distance.

== Schedule ==
R	Round 1	½	Semifinals	F	Final

Date	Thu 2		Fri 3		Sat 4	
Event	M	E	M	E	M	E
T34 800m			R		F	
T53 800m	R	F				
T54 800m	R	F				

== Medal summary ==
The following is a summary of the medals awarded across all 800 metres events.

Classification	Gold		Silver		Bronze	
T34	Walid Ktila; Tunisia	1:45.50	Mohamed Hammadi; United Arab Emirates	1:45.59	Wang Yang; China	1:45.68
T53	Pongsakorn Paeyo; Thailand	1:36.07 GR	Brent Lakatos; Canada	1:36.32	Pierre Fairbank; France	1:39.67
T54	Marcel Hug; Switzerland	1:33.68	Dai Yunqiang; China	1:34.11	Saichon Konjen; Thailand	1:34.19

== Results ==
The following were the results of the finals only of each of the Men's 800 metres events in each of the classifications. Further details of each event, including where appropriate heats and semi finals results, are available on that event's dedicated page.

=== T34 ===
The T34 category is for wheelchair athletes with cerebral palsy. Athletes in this category have minimal limitations or control problems in their arms and trunk while pushing a wheelchair.

The final in this classification took place on 4 September 2021, at 9:55:

Rank	Lane	Name	Nationality	Time	Notes
1st place, gold medalist(s)	4	Walid Ktila	Tunisia	1:45.50	
2nd place, silver medalist(s)	3	Mohamed Hammadi	United Arab Emirates	1:45.59	
3rd place, bronze medalist(s)	2	Wang Yang	China	1:45.68	SB
4	6	Henry Manni	Finland	1:47.34	
5	8	Austin Smeenk	Canada	1:47.58	
6	1	Rheed McCracken	Australia	1:47.68	SB
7	5	Isaac Towers	Great Britain	1:48.08	
8	7	Ben Rowlings	Great Britain	1:48.63	

=== T53 ===
The T53 category is for wheelchair athletes with normal use of arms and hands, no or limited trunk function, and no leg function.

The final in this classification took place on 2 September, at 20:03:

Rank	Lane	Name	Nationality	Time	Notes
1st place, gold medalist(s)	3	Pongsakorn Paeyo	Thailand	1:36.07	GR
2nd place, silver medalist(s)	6	Brent Lakatos	Canada	1:36.32	
3rd place, bronze medalist(s)	4	Pierre Fairbank	France	1:39.67	
4	2	Yang Shaoqiao	China	1:40.08	SB
5	7	Pichet Krungget	Thailand	1:40.09	
6	1	Vitalii Gritsenko	RPC	1:40.51	SB
7	5	Masaberee Arsae	Thailand	1:42.09	
8	8	Brian Siemann	United States	1:47.18	

=== T54 ===
The T54 category is for wheelchair athletes with no leg function, but near full arm function and reasonable to normal trunk function. Typically this may be caused by a lower spinal cord injury or spinal cord birth defect.

The final in this classification took place on 2 September, at 20:32:

Rank	Lane	Name	Nationality	Time	Notes
1st place, gold medalist(s)	5	Marcel Hug	Switzerland	1:33.68	
2nd place, silver medalist(s)	2	Dai Yunqiang	China	1:34.11	SB
3rd place, bronze medalist(s)	7	Saichon Konjen	Thailand	1:34.19	
4	6	Daniel Romanchuk	United States	1:34.48	
5	8	Zhang Yong	China	1:34.55	
6	4	Prawat Wahoram	Thailand	1:34.58	
7	3	Putharet Khongrak	Thailand	1:35.86	
8	1	Julien Casoli	France	1:39.62	
