= Athletics at the 2020 Summer Paralympics – Men's 800 metres T53 =

Men's 800 metres T53 at the XVI Paralympic Games
- Venue: Tokyo National Stadium
- Dates: 2 September 2021 (final)
- Competitors: 11 from 7 nations
- Winning time: 1:36.07

Medalists
1st place, gold medalist(s)		Pongsakorn Paeyo	Thailand
2nd place, silver medalist(s)		Brent Lakatos	Canada
3rd place, bronze medalist(s)		Pierre Fairbank	France

The men's 800 metres T53 event at the 2020 Summer Paralympics in Tokyo, took place on 2 September 2021.

The T53 category is for wheelchair athletes with normal use of arms and hands, no or limited trunk function, and no leg function.

== Records ==
Prior to the competition, the existing records were as follows:

World Record	Brent Lakatos (CAN)	1:31.69	Arbon, Switzerland	2 June 2019
Paralympic Record	Li Huzhao (CHN)	1:36.30	Beijing, China	15 September 2008

Area	Time	Athlete	Nation
Africa	1:44.68	Walid Ktila	Tunisia
America	1:31.69 WR	Brent Lakatos	Canada
Asia	1:34.91	Hong Suk-man	South Korea
Europe	1:32.36	Pierre Fairbank	France
Oceania	1:37.49	Richard Colman	Australia

== Results ==
=== Heats ===
Heat 1 took place on 2 September 2021, at 11:21:

Rank	Lane	Name	Nationality	Time	Notes
1	3	Brent Lakatos	Canada	1:42.29	Q
2	4	Masaberee Arsae	Thailand	1:42.52	Q
3	7	Vitalii Gritsenko	RPC	1:42.52	Q
4	5	Nicolas Brignone	France	1:46.85	
5	6	Joshusa George	United States	1:55.33	

Heat 2 took place on 2 September 2021, at 11:29:

Rank	Lane	Name	Nationality	Time	Notes
1	7	Pongsakorn Paeyo	Thailand	1:40.28	Q
2	3	Pichet Krungget	Thailand	1:40.90	Q
3	8	Yang Shaoqiao	China	1:41.19	Q, SB
4	4	Pierre Fairbank	France	1:41.28	q
5	6	Brian Siemann	United States	1:41.52	q
6	5	Yoo Byung-hoon	South Korea	1:41.55	SB

=== Final ===
The final took place on 2 September, at 20:03:

Rank	Lane	Name	Nationality	Time	Notes
1st place, gold medalist(s)	3	Pongsakorn Paeyo	Thailand	1:36.07	GR
2nd place, silver medalist(s)	6	Brent Lakatos	Canada	1:36.32	
3rd place, bronze medalist(s)	4	Pierre Fairbank	France	1:39.67	
4	2	Yang Shaoqiao	China	1:40.08	SB
5	7	Pichet Krungget	Thailand	1:40.09	
6	1	Vitalii Gritsenko	RPC	1:40.51	SB
7	5	Masaberee Arsae	Thailand	1:42.09	
8	8	Brian Siemann	United States	1:47.18	
