= Athletics at the 2024 Summer Paralympics – Men's 400 metres =

Athletics – Men's 400 metres at the XVII Paralympic Games
- Venue: Stade de France
- Dates: 30 August – 7 September 2024
- No. of events: 12

400 metres at the 2024 Summer Paralympics
Men · T11 · T12 · T13 · T20 · T36 · T37 · T38 · T47 · T52 · T53 · T54 · T62
Women · T11 · T12 · T13 · T20 · T37 · T38 · T47 · T53 · T54 ·

The Men's 400m athletics events for the 2024 Summer Paralympics will take place at the Stade de France from 30 August to 7 September 2024. A total of 12 events will be contested over this distance.

== Schedule ==
R	Round 1	½	Semifinals	F	Final

Date	Fri 30		Sat 31		Sun 1		Mon 2		Tue 3		Wed 4		Thu 5		Fri 6		Sat 7	
Event	M	E	M	E	M	E	M	E	M	E	M	E	M	E	M	E	M	E
T11 400m			R	½		F												
T12 400m										R	½		F					
T13 400m												R	F					
T20 400m								R		F								
T36 400m									F									
T37 400m									R		F							
T38 400m							R			F								
T47 400m															R			F
T52 400m	R	F																
T53 400m					R	F												
T54 400m					R	F												
T62 400m																F		

== Medal summary ==
The following is a summary of the medals awarded across all 400 metres events.

Classification	Gold		Silver		Bronze	
T11	Enderson Santos; Venezuela	50.58	Timothée Adolphe; France	50.75	Atangana Guillaume Junior; Refugee Paralympic Team	50.89
T12	Mouncef Bouja; Morocco	48.62	Noah Malone; United States	49.35	Rouay Jebabli; Tunisia	49.56
T13	Skander Djamil Athmani; Algeria	47.43	Ryota Fukunaga; Japan	48.07	Buinder Bermúdez; Colombia	48.83 AR
T20	Jhon Obando; Colombia	48.09	David José Pineda Mejía; Spain	48.24	Yovanni Philippe; Mauritius	48.30 SB
T36	James Turner; Australia	51.54 WR	William Stedman; New Zealand	52.92 PB	Alexis Sebastian Chavez; Argentina	53.60 AR
T37	Andrei Vdovin; Neutral Paralympic Athletes	50.27	Bartolomeu da Silva Chaves; Brazil	50.39	Amen Allah Tissaoui; Tunisia	50.50
T38	Jaydin Blackwell; United States	48.49 PR, =WR	Ryan Medrano; United States	49.74	Juan Campas; Colombia	49.92
T47	Aymane El Haddaoui; Morocco	46.65 WR	Ayoub Sadni; Morocco	47.16	Thomaz Ruan de Moraes; Brazil	47.97 SB
T52	Maxime Carabin; Belgium	55.10	Tomoki Sato; Japan	56.26	Tomoya Ito; Japan	1:01.08
T53	Pongsakorn Paeyo; Thailand	46.77	Brent Lakatos; Canada	47.24	Brian Siemann; United States	47.84
T54	Dai Yunqiang; China	44.55	Athiwat Paeng-nuea; Thailand	44.67	Daniel Romanchuk; United States	45.11
T62	Hunter Woodhall; United States	46.36	Johannes Floors; Germany	46.90 SB	Olivier Hendriks; Netherlands	46.91 PB

== Results ==
The following were the results of the finals only of each of the Men's 400 metres events in each of the classifications. Further details of each event, including where appropriate heats and semi finals results, are available on that event's dedicated page.

=== T11 ===
The T11 category is for athletes with a visual impairment. A T11 athlete may be entirely without sight, or be able to perceive light, but have no ability to see the shape of a hand at any distance. T11 athletes commonly run with guides.

The final in this classification took place on 1 September 2024, at 21:05:

Rank	Lane	Name	Nationality	Time	Notes
1st place, gold medalist(s)	7	Enderson Germán Santos González; Guide: Eubrig José Maza Caraballo	Venezuela	50.58	PB
2nd place, silver medalist(s)	5	Timothée Adolphe; Guide: Jeffrey Lami	France	50.75	
3rd place, bronze medalist(s)	3	Guillaume Junior Atangana; Guide: Donard Ndim Nyamjua	Refugee Paralympic Team	50.89	PB
4	1	Mohammed Ayade; Guide: Ahmed Al-Kinani	Iraq	51.25	AR

=== T12 ===
The T12 category is for athletes with visual impairment. Athletes in this category will generally have some residual sight, the ability to recognise the shape of a hand at a distance of 2 metres and the ability to perceive clearly will be no more than 2/60. T12 athletes commonly run with guides.

The final in this classification will take place on 5 September 2024, at 10:08:

Rank	Lane	Name	Nationality	Time	Notes
1st place, gold medalist(s)	7	Mouncef Bouja	Morocco	48.62	
2nd place, silver medalist(s)	3	Noah Malone	United States	49.35	
3rd place, bronze medalist(s)	5	Rouay Jebabli	Tunisia	49.56	
4	1	Oguz Akbulut	Turkey	50.68	

=== T13 ===
The T13 category is for athletes with a moderate visual impairment. Athletes in this category have a variety of visual impairments, but can typically recognize contours from a distance of 2 to 6 metres. Athletes in this category do not typically require a guide.

The final in this classification will take place on 5 September 2024, at 10:17:

Rank	Lane	Athlete	Nation	Time	Notes
1st place, gold medalist(s)	5	Skander Djamil Athmani	Algeria	47.43	
2nd place, silver medalist(s)	6	Fukunoga Ryota	Japan	48.07	
3rd place, bronze medalist(s)	8	Buinder Bermúdez	Colombia	48.83	AR
4	7	Johannes Nambala	Namibia	48.89	SB
5	4	Edwin Masuge	Botswana	49.38	PB
6	9	Max Marziller	Germany	50.49	
7	3	Abdellatif Baka	Algeria	52.25	
8	2	Moses Misoya	Malawi	54.27	PB
—	1	Jakkarin Dammunee	Thailand	DNS	

=== T20 ===
The T20 category is for athletes with intellectual impairment. T20 athletes have an IQ score of 75 or less.

The final in this classification took place on 3 September 2024, at 20:36:

Rank	Lane	Name	Nationality	Time	Notes
1st place, gold medalist(s)	8	Jhon Obando	Colombia	48.09	
2nd place, silver medalist(s)	6	David José Pineda Mejía	Spain	48.24	
3rd place, bronze medalist(s)	9	Yovanni Philippe	Mauritius	48.30	
4	3	Muhammad Ammar Aiman Nor Azmi	Malaysia	48.38	
5	5	Samuel Oliveira Conceicao	Brazil	48.59	
6	2	Luis Felipe Rodríguez Bolívar	Venezuela	48.72	
7	7	Daniel Tavares Martins	Brazil	48.91	
8	4	Charles-Antoine Kouakou	France	49.04	

=== T36 ===
The T36 category is for ambulant athletes with cerebral palsy. These athletes do not have the capacity to remain still and they show involuntary movements with all four limbs affected. They usually walk without assistive devices.

The final in this classification took place on 3 September 2024, at 12:04:

Rank	Lane	Name	Nationality	Time	Notes
1st place, gold medalist(s)	7	James Turner	Australia	51.54	WR
2nd place, silver medalist(s)	5	William Stedman	New Zealand	52.92	PB
3rd place, bronze medalist(s)	6	Alexis Sebastian Chavez	Argentina	53.60	AR
4	4	Takeru Matsumoto	Japan	53.63	AR
5	9	Evgenii Shvetsov	Neutral Paralympic Athletes	53.67	SB
6	8	Fakhr Eddine Thelaidjia	Algeria	53.91	AR
7	3	Izzat Turgunov	Uzbekistan	1:04:31	PB

=== T37 ===
The T37 category is for ambulant athletes with cerebral palsy. These athletes have movement and coordination problems on one half of their body. They have good ability in their dominant side of their body (ie hemiplegia).

The final in this classification took place on 4 September 2024, at 11:05:

Rank	Lane	Name	Nationality	Time	Notes
1st place, gold medalist(s)	9	Andrei Vdovin	Neutral Paralympic Athletes	50.27	SB
2nd place, silver medalist(s)	6	Bartolomeu da Silva Chaves	Brazil	50.39	PB
3rd place, bronze medalist(s)	8	Amen Allah Tissaoui	Tunisia	50.50	AR
4	7	Mykola Raiskyi	Ukraine	51.79	PB
5	2	Michal Kotkowski	Poland	51.83	SB
6	5	Yaroslav Okapinskyi	Ukraine	51.99	SB
7	3	Yeferson Suárez	Colombia	52.49	
8	4	Anton Feoktistov	Neutral Paralympic Athletes	52.54	

=== T38 ===
The T38 category is for ambulant athletes with cerebral palsy. T38 athletes have the mildest form of impairment caused by cerebral palsy, often in only one limb, and not affecting the ability to run, walk or jump freely, although impairing performance. T38 athletes may suffer minor co-ordination difficulties.

The final in this classification took place on 3 September 2024, at 19:21:

Rank	Lane	Name	Nationality	Time	Notes
1st place, gold medalist(s)	6	Jaydin Blackwell	United States	48.49	=WR
2nd place, silver medalist(s)	5	Ryan Medrano	United States	49.74	PB
3rd place, bronze medalist(s)	4	Juan Campas	Colombia	49.92	PB
4	8	Ali Al-Rikabi	Iraq	50.34	PB
5	7	Zachary Gingras	Canada	50.63	SB
6	9	José Rodolfo Chessani	Mexico	51.41	
7	3	Teófilo Freitas	Timor-Leste	55.18	SB
8	2	Carlos Alberto Castillo	Nicaragua	59.28	SB

=== T47 ===
The T47 category is for athletes who have a single below elbow or wrist amputation or similar disability, with normal function in both legs.

The final in this classification will take place on 7 September 2024, at 20:55:

Rank	Lane	Name	Nationality	Time	Notes
1st place, gold medalist(s)	8	Aymane El Haddaoui	Morocco	46.65	WR
2nd place, silver medalist(s)	6	Ayoub Sadni	Morocco	47.16	
3rd place, bronze medalist(s)	5	Thomaz Ruan de Moraes	Brazil	47.97	SB
4	4	Luis Fernando Lara	Colombia	48.68	PB
5	3	Marufjon Murodulloev	Uzbekistan	48.89	PB
6	2	Luis Andres Vasquez Segura	Dominican Republic	49.07	PB
7	7	Collen Mahlalela	South Africa	49.95	
8	9	Dilip Gavit	India	49.99	

=== T52 ===
The T52 category is for wheelchair athletes with damage to spinal cord in the higher parts of the back, substantially impaired or no trunk function, and minimal or no leg function. Pushing power comes from elbow extensions, and appears close to normal except for use of modified gloves to compensate for grip.

The final in this classification took place on 30 August 2024, at 19:14:

Rank	Lane	Name	Nationality	Time	Notes
1st place, gold medalist(s)	5	Maxime Carabin	Belgium	55.10	
2nd place, silver medalist(s)	6	Tomoki Sato	Japan	56.26	
3rd place, bronze medalist(s)	7	Tomoya Ito	Japan	1:01.08	
4	9	Leonardo de Jesus Perez Juarez	Mexico	1:03.43	
5	8	Fabian Blum	Switzerland	1:03.71	
6	2	Anthony Bouchard	Canada	1:04.09	
7	4	Salvador Hernandez Mondragon	Mexico	1:04.32	
8	3	Jerrold Mangliwan	Philippines	1:04.55	

=== T53 ===
The T53 category is for wheelchair athletes with normal use of arms and hands, no or limited trunk function, and no leg function.

The final in this classification took place on 1 September 2024, at 19:55:

Rank	Lane	Name	Nationality	Time	Notes
1st place, gold medalist(s)	5	Pongsakorn Paeyo	Thailand	46.77	
2nd place, silver medalist(s)	8	Brent Lakatos	Canada	47.24	SB
3rd place, bronze medalist(s)	6	Brian Siemann	United States	47.84	PB
4	7	Pichet Krungget	Thailand	48.62	
5	4	Abdulrahman Alqurashi	Saudi Arabia	49.38	
6	3	Pierre Fairbank	France	50.37	
7	9	Masaberee Arsae	Thailand	50.45	
8	2	Ariosvaldo Fernandes da Silva	Brazil	52.42	

=== T54 ===
The T54 category is for wheelchair athletes with no leg function, but near full arm function and reasonable to normal trunk function. Typically this may be caused by a lower spinal cord injury or spinal cord birth defect.

The final in this classification took place on 1 September 2024, at 20:20:

Rank	Lane	Name	Nationality	Time	Notes
1st place, gold medalist(s)	7	Dai Yunqiang	China	44.55	PR
2nd place, silver medalist(s)	8	Athiwat Paeng-nuea	Thailand	44.67	SB
3rd place, bronze medalist(s)	6	Daniel Romanchuk	United States	45.11	AR
4	5	Nathan Maguire	Great Britain	45.78	
5	4	Yassine Gharbi	Tunisia	45.99	
6	9	Hu Yang	China	46.06	
7	2	Phiphatphong Sianglam	Thailand	46.59	
8	3	Juan Cervantes Garcia	Mexico	48.45	

=== T62 ===
The T62 Category is for athletes with bilateral below knee limb deficiency competing with prostheses.

The final in this classification took place on 6 September 2024, at 19:33:

Rank	Lane	Name	Nationality	Time	Notes
1st place, gold medalist(s)	6	Hunter Woodhall	United States	46.36	
2nd place, silver medalist(s)	7	Johannes Floors	Germany	46.90	SB
3rd place, bronze medalist(s)	5	Olivier Hendriks	Netherlands	46.91	PB
4	8	Blake Leeper	United States	47.32	PB
5	4	Alan Oliveira Becker Fonteles	Brazil	50.30	
6	3	Paul Daniels	South Africa	50.63	PB
7	2	Stylianos Malakopoulos	Greece	52.76	PB
8	9	Daniel du Plessis	South Africa	52.91	
