= Athletics at the 2020 Summer Paralympics – Men's 400 metres T53 =

Men's 400 metres T53 at the XVI Paralympic Games
- Venue: Tokyo National Stadium
- Dates: 29 August 2021 (final)
- Competitors: 14 from 10 nations
- Winning time: 46.61

Medalists
1st place, gold medalist(s)		Pongsakorn Paeyo	Thailand
2nd place, silver medalist(s)		Brent Lakatos	Canada
3rd place, bronze medalist(s)		Vitalii Gritsenko	RPC

The men's 400 metres T53 event at the 2020 Summer Paralympics in Tokyo, took place on 29 August 2021.

The T53 category is for wheelchair athletes with normal use of arms and hands, no or limited trunk function, and no leg function.

== Records ==
Prior to the competition, the existing records were as follows:

World Record	Brent Lakatos (CAN)	46.82	Arbon, Switzerland	1 June 2019
Paralympic Record	Hong Suk-man (KOR)	47.67	Beijing, China	11 September 2008

Area	Time	Athlete	Nation
Africa	51.57	Walid Ktila	Tunisia
America	46.82 WR	Brent Lakatos	Canada
Asia	47.36	Hong Suk-man	South Korea
Europe	48.88	Pierre Fairbank	France
Oceania	49.36	Richard Colman	Australia

== Results ==
=== Heats ===
Heat 1 took place on 29 August 2021, at 11:25:

Rank	Lane	Name	Nationality	Time	Notes
1	3	Pongsakorn Paeyo	Thailand	47.31	Q, GR
2	2	Yoo Byung-hoon	South Korea	49.29	Q, PB
3	8	Ariosvaldo Fernandes	Brazil	51.65	Q, SB
4	6	Josh George	United States	52.24	SB
5	5	Nicolas Brignone	France	52.28	
	7	Masaberee Arsae	Thailand	DQ	WPA 18.5a
	4	Yang Shaoqiao	China	DQ	WPA 18.5a

Heat 2 took place on 29 August 2021, at 11:34:

Rank	Lane	Name	Nationality	Time	Notes
1	7	Brent Lakatos	Canada	48.00	Q
2	8	Pichet Krungget	Thailand	48.70	Q, PB
3	5	Pierre Fairbank	France	48.70	Q, AR
4	2	Vitalii Gritsenko	RPC	48.74	q, PB
5	3	Brian Siemann	United States	49.74	q, SB
6	4	Tomoya Ito	Japan	57.16	PB
7	6	Abdul Rahman Al-Qurashi	Saudi Arabia	1:06.26	

=== Final ===
The final took place on 29 August 2021, at 20:01:

Rank	Lane	Name	Nationality	Time	Notes
1st place, gold medalist(s)	5	Pongsakorn Paeyo	Thailand	46.61	WR
2nd place, silver medalist(s)	4	Brent Lakatos	Canada	46.75	AR
3rd place, bronze medalist(s)	2	Vitalii Gritsenko	RPC	49.41	
4	3	Brian Siemann	United States	49.61	SB
5	6	Pichet Krungget	Thailand	49.96	
6	8	Pierre Fairbank	France	50.00	
7	7	Byunghoon Yoo	South Korea	50.02	
8	9	Ariosvaldo Fernandes	Brazil	52.48	
