= Athletics at the 2020 Summer Paralympics – Men's 100 metres T53 =

Men's 100 metres T53 at the XVI Paralympic Games
- Venue: Tokyo National Stadium
- Dates: 1 September 2021 (final)
- Competitors: 13 from 10 nations
- Winning time: 14.20

Medalists
1st place, gold medalist(s)		Pongsakorn Paeyo	Thailand
2nd place, silver medalist(s)		Brent Lakatos	Canada
3rd place, bronze medalist(s)		Abdulrahman Al-Qurashi	Saudi Arabia

Men's 100 metres
T11 · T12 · T13 · T33 · T34 · T35 · T36 · T37 · T38 · T47 · T51 · T52 · T53 · T54 · T63 · T64

The men's 100 metres T53 event at the 2020 Summer Paralympics in Tokyo, took place on 1 September 2021.

The T53 category is for wheelchair athletes with normal use of arms and hands, no or limited trunk function, and no leg function.

== Records ==
Prior to the competition, the existing records were as follows:

World Record	Brent Lakatos (CAN)	14.10	Arbon, Switzerland	27 May 2017
Paralympic Record	Brent Lakatos (CAN)	14.43	Rio de Janeiro, Brazil	9 September 2016

Area	Time	Athlete	Nation
Africa	15.72	Walid Ktila	Tunisia
America	14.10 WR	Brent Lakatos	Canada
Asia	14.40	Pongsakorn Paeyo	Thailand
Europe	14.47	Mickey Bushell	Great Britain
Oceania	15.66	Richard Colman	Australia

== Results ==
=== Heats ===
Heat 1 took place on 1 September 2021, at 11:00:

Rank	Lane	Name	Nationality	Time	Notes
1	7	Brent Lakatos	Canada	14.49	Q, SB
2	4	Fahad Al-Ganaidl	Saudi Arabia	15.08	Q
3	3	Ariosvaldo Fernandes	Brazil	15.30	Q
4	6	Pichet Krungget	Thailand	15.30	q, SB
5	8	Yang Shaoqiao	China	15.46	SB
6	5	Nicolas Brignone	France	15.81	

Heat 2 took place on 1 September 2021, at 11:07:

Rank	Lane	Name	Nationality	Time	Notes
1	3	Pongsakorn Paeyo	Thailand	14.30	Q, GR
2	3	Abdulrahman Al-Qurashi	Saudi Arabia	14.52	Q, PB
3	8	Pierre Fairbank	France	15.09	Q
4	6	Vitalii Gritsenko	RPC	15.26	q, PB
5	4	Brian Siemann	United States	15.32	SB
6	5	Yoo Byung-hoon	South Korea	15.37	SB
7	7	Pürevtsogiin Enkhmanlai	Mongolia	15.97	PB

=== Final ===
The final took place on 1 September 2021, at 19:20:

Rank	Lane	Name	Nationality	Time	Notes
1st place, gold medalist(s)	6	Pongsakorn Paeyo	Thailand	14.20	GR
2nd place, silver medalist(s)	4	Brent Lakatos	Canada	14.55	
3rd place, bronze medalist(s)	5	Abdulrahman Al-Qurashi	Saudi Arabia	14.76	
4	9	Ariosvaldo Fernandes	Brazil	15.41	
5	8	Pierre Fairbank	France	15.41	
6	2	Pichet Krungget	Thailand	15.43	
7	7	Fahad Al-Ganaidl	Saudi Arabia	15.48	
8	3	Vitalii Gritsenko	RPC	15.55	
