= Athletics at the 2020 Summer Paralympics – Men's 400 metres =

Athletics – Men's 400 metres at the XVI Paralympic Games
- Venue: Tokyo National Stadium
- Dates: 27 August – 4 September 2021
- No. of events: 12
- Competitors: 135 from 55 nations

The Men's 400m athletics events for the 2020 Summer Paralympics took place at the Tokyo National Stadium from August 27 to September 4, 2021. A total of 12 events were contested over this distance.

== Schedule ==
R	Round 1	½	Semifinals	F	Final

Date	Fri 27		Sat 28		Sun 29		Mon 30		Tue 31		Wed 1		Thu 2		Fri 3		Sat 4	
Event	M	E	M	E	M	E	M	E	M	E	M	E	M	E	M	E	M	E
T11 400m			R	½		F												
T12 400m										R	½		F					
T13 400m												R	F					
T20 400m								R		F								
T36 400m				R					F									
T37 400m									R		F							
T38 400m							R			F								
T47 400m															R			F
T52 400m	R	F																
T53 400m					R	F												
T54 400m					R	F												
T62 400m													R		F			

== Medal summary ==
The following is a summary of the medals awarded across all 400 metres events.

Classification	Gold		Silver		Bronze	
T11	Spain; Gerard Descarrega; Guide: Guillermo Rojo Gil	50.42	Namibia; Ananias Shikongo; Guide: Sem Shimanda	51.14	France; Gautier Makunda; Guide: Lucas Mathonat	51.74
T12	Abdeslam Hili; Morocco	47.59 WR	Noah Malone; United States	47.93 AR	Rouay Jebabli; Tunisia	48.93
T13	Skander Djamil Athmani; Algeria	46.70 WR	Mohamed Amguoun; Morocco	47.70	Johannes Nambala; Namibia	48.76
T20	Charles-Antoine Kouakou; France	47.63 AR	Luis Felipe Rodríguez Bolívar; Venezuela	47.71	Columba Blango; Great Britain	47.81
T36	James Turner; Australia	52.80 GR	Evgenii Shvetcov; RPC	53.60	William Stedman; New Zealand	54.75
T37	Andrey Vdovin; RPC	49.34 WR	Nick Mayhugh; United States	50.26 AR	Chermen Kobesov; RPC	50.44
T38	Jose Rodolfo Chessani; Mexico	49.99 AR	Mohamed Farhat Chida; Tunisia	50.33	Zachary Gingras; Canada	50.85
T47	Ayoub Sadni; Morocco	47.38 WR	Thomaz Ruan de Moraes; Brazil	47.87 =AR	Petrúcio Ferreira; Brazil	48.04
T52	Tomoki Sato; Japan	55.39 GR	Raymond Martin; United States	55.59	Hirokazu Ueyonabaru; Japan	59.95
T53	Pongsakorn Paeyo; Thailand	46.61 WR	Brent Lakatos; Canada	46.75 AR	Vitalii Gritsenko; RPC	49.41
T54	Daniel Romanchuk; United States	45.72	Athiwat Paeng-Nuea; Thailand	45.73	Dai Yunqiang; China	46.20
T62	Johannes Floors; Germany	45.85	Olivier Hendriks; Netherlands	47.95	Hunter Woodhall; United States	48.61

== Results ==
The following were the results of the finals only of each of the Men's 400 metres events in each of the classifications. Further details of each event, including where appropriate heats and semi finals results, are available on that event's dedicated page.

=== T11 ===
The T11 category is for athletes with a visual impairment. A T11 athlete may be entirely without sight, or be able to perceive light, but have no ability to see the shape of a hand at any distance. T11 athletes commonly run with guides.

The final in this classification took place on 29 August 2021, at 19:35:

Rank	Lane	Name	Nationality	Time	Notes
1st place, gold medalist(s)	5	Gerard Descarrega	Spain	50.42	SB
2nd place, silver medalist(s)	3	Ananias Shikongo	Namibia	51.14	SB
3rd place, bronze medalist(s)	1	Gautier Makunda	France	51.74	PB
4	7	Guillaume Junior Atangana	Cameroon	52.17	PB

=== T12 ===
The T12 category is for athletes with visual impairment. Athletes in this category will generally have some residual sight, the ability to recognise the shape of a hand at a distance of 2 metres and the ability to perceive clearly will be no more than 2/60. T12 athletes commonly run with guides.

The final in this classification took place on 2 September 2021, at 9:42:

Rank	Lane	Name	Nationality	Time	Notes
1st place, gold medalist(s)	7	Abdeslam Hili	Morocco	47.59	WR
2nd place, silver medalist(s)	3	Noah Malone	United States	47.93	AR
3rd place, bronze medalist(s)	5	Rouay Jebabli	Tunisia	48.01	PB
4	1	Mahdi Afri	Morocco	48.93	

=== T13 ===
The T13 category is for athletes with a moderate visual impairment. Athletes in this category have a variety of visual impairments, but can typically recognize contours from a distance of 2 to 6 metres. Athletes in this category do not typically require a guide.

The final in this classification took place on 2 September 2021, at 9:54:

Rank	Lane	Name	Nationality	Time	Notes
1st place, gold medalist(s)	6	Skander Djamil Athmani	Algeria	46.70	WR
2nd place, silver medalist(s)	7	Mohamed Amguoun	Morocco	47.70	SB
3rd place, bronze medalist(s)	4	Johannes Nambala	Namibia	48.76	SB
4	8	Buinder Bermúdez	Colombia	49.26	AR
5	9	Aleksandr Shirin	RPC	49.75	SB
6	3	Hakan Cira	Turkey	50.05	
7	2	Edwin Masuge	Botswana	50.54	
8	5	Egor Sharov	RPC	50.96	

=== T20 ===
The T20 category is for athletes with intellectual impairment. T20 athletes have an IQ score of 75 or less.

The final in this classification took place on 31 August 2021, at 19:11:

Rank	Lane	Name	Nationality	Time	Notes
1st place, gold medalist(s)	7	Charles-Antoine Kouakou	France	47.63	AR
2nd place, silver medalist(s)	6	Luis Rodriguez Bolivar	Venezuela	47.71	PB
3rd place, bronze medalist(s)	4	Columba Blango	Great Britain	47.81	PB
4	5	Deliber Rodríguez Ramírez	Spain	48.05	PB
5	2	Ndiaga Dieng	Italy	48.42	PB
6	9	Anderson Alexander Colorado Mina	Ecuador	48.58	SB
7	3	Sandro Patrício Correia	Venezuela	48.79	PB
8	8	Damian Carcelen	Ecuador	49.02	SB

=== T36 ===
The T36 category is for ambulant athletes with cerebral palsy. These athletes do not have the capacity to remain still and they show involuntary movements with all four limbs affected. They usually walk without assistive devices.

The final in this classification took place on 31 August 2021, at 11:20:

Rank	Lane	Name	Nationality	Time	Notes
1st place, gold medalist(s)	3	James Turner	Australia	52.80	GR
2nd place, silver medalist(s)	6	Evgenii Shvetcov	RPC	53.60	SB
3rd place, bronze medalist(s)	4	William Stedman	New Zealand	54.75	
4	2	Alexis Sebastian Chavez	Argentina	55.14	AR
5	5	Krzysztof Ciuksza	Poland	55.90	SB
6	7	Sid Ali Bouzourine	Algeria	57.91	AR
7	8	Takeru Matsumoto	Japan	59.15	

=== T37 ===
The T37 category is for ambulant athletes with cerebral palsy. These athletes have movement and coordination problems on one half of their body. They have good ability in their dominant side of their body (ie hemiplegia).

The final in this classification took place on 1 September 2021, at 10:40:

Rank	Lane	Name	Nationality	Time	Notes
1st place, gold medalist(s)	7	Andrey Vdovin	RPC	49.34	WR
2nd place, silver medalist(s)	3	Nick Mayhugh	United States	50.26	AR
3rd place, bronze medalist(s)	4	Chermen Kobesov	RPC	50.44	PB
4	6	Michał Kotkowski	Poland	50.60	PB
5	5	Charl du Toit	South Africa	51.14	SB
6	8	Yaroslav Okapinskyi	Ukraine	52.49	PB

=== T38 ===
The T38 category is for ambulant athletes with cerebral palsy. T38 athletes have the mildest form of impairment caused by cerebral palsy, often in only one limb, and not affecting the ability to run, walk or jump freely, although impairing performance. T38 athletes may suffer minor co-ordination difficulties.

The final in this classification took place on 31 August 2021, at 19:31:

Rank	Lane	Name	Nationality	Time	Notes
1st place, gold medalist(s)	7	Jose Rodolfo Chessani	Mexico	49.99	AR
2nd place, silver medalist(s)	9	Mohamed Farhat Chida	Tunisia	50.33	SB
3rd place, bronze medalist(s)	5	Zachary Gingras	Canada	50.85	PB
4	8	Ali Al-Rikabi	Iraq	50.90	PB
5	6	Dyan Buis	South Africa	51.39	
6	2	Anton Feoktistov	RPC	52.27	
7	4	Shaun Burrows	Great Britain	53.25	
8	3	Dixon Hooker	Colombia	54.04	SB

=== T47 ===
The T47 category is for athletes who have a single below elbow or wrist amputation or similar disability, with normal function in both legs.

The final in this classification took place on 4 September 2021, at 21:01:

Rank	Lane	Name	Nationality	Time	Notes
1st place, gold medalist(s)	6	Ayoub Sadni	Morocco	47.38	WR
2nd place, silver medalist(s)	7	Thomaz Ruan de Moraes	Brazil	47.87	=AR
3rd place, bronze medalist(s)	5	Petrúcio Ferreira	Brazil	48.04	SB
4	4	Tanner Wright	United States	49.36	PB
5	9	Luis Andrés Vásquez Segura	Dominican Republic	49.61	PB
6	2	Thomas Normandeau	Canada	50.02	
7	3	Lucas de Sousa	Brazil	50.11	
	8	Rayven Sample	United States	DQ	WPA 18.5a

=== T52 ===
The T52 category is for wheelchair athletes with damage to spinal cord in the higher parts of the back, substantially impaired or no trunk function, and minimal or no leg function. Pushing power comes from elbow extensions, and appears close to normal except for use of modified gloves to compensate for grip.

The final in this classification took place on 27 August 2021, at 20:16:

Rank	Lane	Name	Nationality	Time	Notes
1st place, gold medalist(s)	7	Tomoki Sato	Japan	55.39	PR
2nd place, silver medalist(s)	4	Raymond Martin	United States	55.59	SB
3rd place, bronze medalist(s)	5	Hirokazu Ueyonabaru	Japan	59.95	
4	6	Gianfranco Iannotta	United States	1:00.57	PB
5	8	Leonardo De Jesus Perez Juarez	Mexico	1:01.66	
6	2	Thomas Geierspichler	Austria	1:02.68	SB
	3	Jerrold Mangliwan	Philippines	DQ	WPA 18.5a
	9	Isaiah Rigo	United States	DQ	WPA 18.5a

=== T53 ===
The T53 category is for wheelchair athletes with normal use of arms and hands, no or limited trunk function, and no leg function.

The final in this classification took place on 29 August 2021, at 20:01:

Rank	Lane	Name	Nationality	Time	Notes
1st place, gold medalist(s)	5	Pongsakorn Paeyo	Thailand	46.61	WR
2nd place, silver medalist(s)	4	Brent Lakatos	Canada	46.75	AR
3rd place, bronze medalist(s)	2	Vitalii Gritsenko	RPC	49.41	
4	3	Brian Siemann	United States	49.61	SB
5	6	Pichet Krungget	Thailand	49.96	
6	8	Pierre Fairbank	France	50.00	
7	7	Byunghoon Yoo	South Korea	50.02	
8	9	Ariosvaldo Fernandes	Brazil	52.48	

=== T54 ===
The T54 category is for wheelchair athletes with no leg function, but near full arm function and reasonable to normal trunk function. Typically this may be caused by a lower spinal cord injury or spinal cord birth defect.

The final in this classification took place on 29 August 2021, at 20:21:

Rank	Lane	Name	Nationality	Time	Notes
1st place, gold medalist(s)	5	Daniel Romanchuk	United States	45.72	
2nd place, silver medalist(s)	4	Athiwat Paeng-Nuea	Thailand	45.73	
3rd place, bronze medalist(s)	6	Dai Yunqiang	China	46.20	
4	2	Saichon Konjen	Thailand	46.42	PB
5	9	Zhang Yong	China	47.17	
6	3	Nathan Maguire	Great Britain	47.17	
7	8	Richard Chiassaro	Great Britain	47.37	SB
8	7	Putharet Khongrak	Thailand	47.56	

=== T62 ===
The final in this classification took place on 3 September 2021, at 19:33:

Rank	Lane	Name	Nationality	Time	Notes
1st place, gold medalist(s)	6	Johannes Floors	Germany	45.85	SB
2nd place, silver medalist(s)	4	Olivier Hendriks	Netherlands	47.95	PB
3rd place, bronze medalist(s)	7	Hunter Woodhall	United States	48.61	SB
4	9	Tebogo Mofokeng	South Africa	50.09	AR
5	3	Ioannis Sevdikalis	Greece	52.51	PB
6	5	Nick Rogers	United States	52.98	SB
7	8	Daniel du Plessis	South Africa	53.56	
8	2	Stylianos Malakopoulos	Greece	56.75	PB
