= 2019 World Para Athletics Championships – Men's 800 metres =

The men's 800 metres events at the 2019 World Para Athletics Championships were held in Dubai on 7, 9, 12 and 15 November 2019.

== Medalists ==
Event	Gold		Silver		Bronze	
T34 details	Mohamed Alhammadi; United Arab Emirates	1:44.36 CR	Walid Ktila; Tunisia	1:44.79	Wang Yang; China	1:46.04
T36 details	Paul Blake; United Kingdom	2:07.44 SB	Sid Ali Bouzourine; Algeria	2:15.85	José Pámpano; Spain	2:27.70
T53 details	Brent Lakatos; Canada	1:40.59	Pongsakorn Paeyo; Thailand	1:40.72	Yoo Byung-hoon; South Korea	1:41.53
T54 details	Daniel Romanchuk; United States	1:32.81 CR	Marcel Hug; Switzerland	1:32.89	Zhang Yong; China	1:33.05
WR world record | AR area record | CR championship record | GR games record | NR national record | OR Olympic record | PB personal best | SB season best | WL world leading (in a given season)

== T34 ==
=== Records ===
T33	World record	Ahmad Al-Mutairi (KUW)	1:52.52	Doha, Qatar	25 October 2015
T33	Championship record	Ahmad Al-Mutairi (KUW)	1:52.52	Doha, Qatar	25 October 2015
T34	World record	Mohamed Alhammadi (UAE)	1:37.84	Arbon, Switzerland	25 May 2017
T34	Championship record	Walid Ktila (TUN)	1:44.79	London, United Kingdom	20 July 2017

=== Schedule ===
Date	Time	Round
14 November	19:22	Round 1
15 November	19:18	Final

=== Round 1 ===
First 3 of each heat (Q) and the next 2 fastest (q) advance to the final.

Rank	Heat	Lane	Sport Class	Name	Nationality	Time	Notes
1	1	7	T34	Mohamed Alhammadi	United Arab Emirates	1:47.03	Q
2	1	5	T34	Wang Yang	China	1:47.26	Q
3	1	4	T34	Isaac Towers	United Kingdom	1:47.79	Q
4	1	6	T34	Austin Smeenk	Canada	1:47.84	q
5	1	9	T34	Bojan Mitic	Switzerland	1:49.23	q
6	1	8	T34	Chaiwat Rattana	Thailand	1:50.61	PB
7	2	4	T34	Walid Ktila	Tunisia	1:51.64	Q
8	2	5	T34	Ben Rowlings	United Kingdom	1:51.71	Q
9	2	9	T34	Rheed McCracken	Australia	1:52.07	Q
10	2	7	T34	Henry Manni	Finland	1:52.64	
11	2	3	T34	Roberto Michel	Mauritius	1:53.75	PB
12	2	8	T34	Ahmed Nawad	United Arab Emirates	1:54.02	PB
13	2	6	T34	Lee Leclerc	Canada	1:54.82	
	1	3	T33	Ahmad Al-Mutairi	Kuwait	DNS	

=== Final ===
The final was started on 15 November at 19:18.

Rank	Lane	Sport Class	Name	Nationality	Time	Notes
1st place, gold medalist(s)	4	T34	Mohamed Alhammadi	United Arab Emirates	1:44.36	CR
2nd place, silver medalist(s)	5	T34	Walid Ktila	Tunisia	1:44.79	
3rd place, bronze medalist(s)	8	T34	Wang Yang	China	1:46.04	
4	6	T34	Austin Smeenk	Canada	1:46.33	
5	2	T34	Rheed McCracken	Australia	1:46.67	
6	9	T34	Isaac Towers	United Kingdom	1:48.02	
7	7	T34	Ben Rowlings	United Kingdom	1:48.46	
8	3	T34	Bojan Mitic	Switzerland	1:48.76	

== T36 ==
=== Records ===
World record	James Turner (AUS)	2:02.39	Rio de Janeiro, Brazil	17 September 2016
Championship record	Paul Blake (GBR)	2:06.10	Lyon, France	22 July 2013

=== Schedule ===
Date	Time	Round
7 November	21:50	Final

=== Final ===
The final was started on 7 November at 21:50.

Rank	Lane	Sport Class	Name	Nationality	Time	Notes
1st place, gold medalist(s)	5	T36	Paul Blake	United Kingdom	2:07.44	SB
2nd place, silver medalist(s)	7	T36	Sid Ali Bouzourine	Algeria	2:15.85	
3rd place, bronze medalist(s)	6	T36	José Pámpano	Spain	2:27.70	
4	4	T36	José Manuel González	Spain	2:28.17	
	8	T36	Bagdat Yelibayev	Kazakhstan	DNS	

== T53 ==
=== Records ===
World record	Brent Lakatos (CAN)	1:31.69	Arbon, Switzerland	2 June 2019
Championship record	Joshua George (USA)	1:39.09	Lyon, France	22 July 2013

=== Schedule ===
Date	Time	Round
12 November	10:41	Round 1
12 November	19:17	Final

=== Round 1 ===
First 3 of each heat (Q) and the next 2 fastest (q) advance to the final.

Rank	Heat	Lane	Sport Class	Name	Nationality	Time	Notes
1	2	4	T53	Brent Lakatos	Canada	1:38.38	Q, CR
2	2	7	T53	Pierre Fairbank	France	1:39.52	Q
3	1	5	T53	Pongsakorn Paeyo	Thailand	1:39.75	Q
4	1	4	T53	Yang Shaoqiao	China	1:39.79	Q
5	2	6	T53	Vitalii Gritsenko	Russia	1:39.93	Q
6	1	8	T53	Yoo Byung-hoon	South Korea	1:40.70	Q
7	2	5	T53	Brian Siemann	United States	1:40.77	q
8	1	7	T53	Joshua George	United States	1:41.14	q
9	1	3	T53	Sopa Intasen	Thailand	1:42.06	SB
10	1	6	T53	Nicolas Brignone	France	1:42.08	
11	2	8	T53	Pichet Krungget	Thailand	1:42.23	
12	2	9	T53	Diego Gastaldi	Italy	1:50.71	
	2	3	T53	Abdulrahman Al-Qurashi	Saudi Arabia	DNS	

=== Final ===
The final was started on 12 November at 19:17.

Rank	Lane	Sport Class	Name	Nationality	Time	Notes
1st place, gold medalist(s)	4	T53	Brent Lakatos	Canada	1:40.59	
2nd place, silver medalist(s)	5	T53	Pongsakorn Paeyo	Thailand	1:40.72	
3rd place, bronze medalist(s)	3	T53	Yoo Byung-hoon	South Korea	1:41.53	
4	2	T53	Brian Siemann	United States	1:41.63	
5	6	T53	Yang Shaoqiao	China	1:41.70	
6	8	T53	Pierre Fairbank	France	1:41.83	
7	9	T53	Joshua George	United States	1:42.04	
8	7	T53	Vitalii Gritsenko	Russia	1:42.37	

== T54 ==
=== Records ===
World record	Daniel Romanchuk (USA)	1:29.66	Tempe, United States	16 June 2018
Championship record	Liu Chengming (CHN)	1:35.41	Doha, Qatar	29 October 2015

=== Schedule ===
Date	Time	Round
8 November	20:28	Round 1
9 November	20:00	Final

=== Round 1 ===
First 2 of each heat (Q) and the next 2 fastest (q) advance to the final.

Rank	Heat	Lane	Sport Class	Name	Nationality	Time	Notes
1	1	4	T54	Daniel Romanchuk	United States	1:35.54	Q
2	1	7	T54	Zhang Yong	China	1:35.86	Q
3	1	3	T54	Julien Casoli	France	1:35.88	q
4	1	5	T54	Tomoki Suzuki	Japan	1:36.37	q
5	1	9	T54	Jake Lappin	Australia	1:37.15	
6	2	6	T54	Marcel Hug	Switzerland	1:37.54	Q
7	3	4	T54	Putharet Khongrak	Thailand	1:37.67	Q
8	1	6	T54	Rawat Tana	Thailand	1:37.69 (.681)	
9	3	5	T54	Yassine Gharbi	Tunisia	1:37.69 (.684)	Q
10	3	6	T54	Nathan Maguire	United Kingdom	1:37.72	
11	3	8	T54	Yan Qing	China	1:37.79	
12	2	5	T54	Richard Chiassaro	United Kingdom	1:37.83	Q
13	1	8	T54	Alexandre Dupont	Canada	1:37.92	
14	3	9	T54	Leo-Pekka Tähti	Finland	1:38.03	
15	2	1	T54	Alexey Bychenok	Russia	1:38.04	
16	3	7	T54	Alhassane Baldé	Germany	1:38.20	
17	1	2	T54	Arsen Kurbanov	Russia	1:38.47	
18	3	3	T54	Aaron Pike	United States	1:38.66	
19	2	4	T54	Song Lei	China	1:38.83	
20	1	1	T54	Leonardo de Melo	Brazil	1:38.99	
21	2	9	T54	Sho Watanabe	Japan	1:39.10	
22	2	8	T54	Saichon Konjen	Thailand	1:39.15	
23	2	2	T54	Alejandro Maldonado	Argentina	1:40.07	
24	2	7	T54	Kenny van Weeghel	Netherlands	1:40.48	
25	2	3	T54	Josh Cassidy	Canada	1:41.05	
26	3	2	T54	Yuki Nishi	Japan	1:41.74	

=== Final ===
The final was started on 9 November at 20:00.

Rank	Lane	Sport Class	Name	Nationality	Time	Notes
1st place, gold medalist(s)	4	T54	Daniel Romanchuk	United States	1:32.81	CR
2nd place, silver medalist(s)	6	T54	Marcel Hug	Switzerland	1:32.89	
3rd place, bronze medalist(s)	9	T54	Zhang Yong	China	1:33.05	
4	5	T54	Yassine Gharbi	Tunisia	1:33.21	SB
5	7	T54	Richard Chiassaro	United Kingdom	1:33.84	
6	3	T54	Julien Casoli	France	1:34.13	
7	2	T54	Putharet Khongrak	Thailand	1:36.18	
8	8	T54	Tomoki Suzuki	Japan	1:36.49	
