= Athletics at the 2024 Summer Paralympics – Men's 400 metres T54 =

Men's 400 metres T54 at the XVII Paralympic Games
- Venue: Stade de France
- Dates: 1 September 2024
- Competitors: 15
- Winning time: 44.55 PR, PB

Medalists
1st place, gold medalist(s)		Dai Yunqiang	China
2nd place, silver medalist(s)		Athiwat Paeng-nuea	Thailand
3rd place, bronze medalist(s)		Daniel Romanchuk	United States

400 metres at the 2024 Summer Paralympics
Men · T11 · T12 · T13 · T20 · T36 · T37 · T38 · T47 · T52 · T53 · T54 · T62
Women · T11 · T12 · T13 · T20 · T37 · T38 · T47 · T53 · T54 ·

The men's 400 metres T54 event at the 2024 Summer Paralympics in Paris, took place on 1 September 2024.

The T54 category is for wheelchair athletes with no leg function, but near full arm function and reasonable to normal trunk function. Typically this may be caused by a lower spinal cord injury or spinal cord birth defect.

== Records ==
Prior to the competition, the existing records were as follows:

World Record	Yassine Gharbi (TUN)	43.46	(United Arab Emirates) Sharjah	19 March 2018
Paralympic Record	Athiwat Paeng-nuea (THA)	44.87	(Japan) Tokyo	29 August 2021

Area	Time	Athlete	Location	Date
Africa				
America				
Asia				
Europe				
Oceania				

== Results ==
=== Round 1 ===
First 3 in each heat (Q) and the next 2 fastest (q) advance to the Final.

==== Heat 1 ====
Rank	Lane	Athlete	Nation	Time	Notes
1	7	Daniel Romanchuk	United States	45.18	Q, AR
2	8	Athiwat Paeng-Nuea	Thailand	45.68	Q
3	2	Yassine Gharbi	Tunisia	46.23	Q
4	3	Zhang Ying	China	47.41	
5	4	Putharet Khongrak	Thailand	47.46	
6	9	Daniel Sidbury	Great Britain	48.05	
7	6	Luke Bailey	Australia	48.11	PB
—	5	Sibhatu Weldemariam	Eritrea	DQ	R18.2(c)

==== Heat 2 ====
Rank	Lane	Athlete	Nation	Time	Notes
1	8	Nathan Maguire	Great Britain	45.47	Q, PB
2	6	Dai Yunqiang	China	45.52	Q, PB
3	3	Hu Yang	China	46.34	Q
4	2	Phiphatphong Sianglam	Thailand	47.21	q
5	4	Juan Pablo Cervantes García	Mexico	47.30	q, SB
6	5	Faisal Alrajehi	Kuwait	48.29	
—	7	Mamudo Balde	Portugal	DQ	R18.2(c)

=== Final ===
Rank	Lane	Athlete	Nation	Time	Notes
1st place, gold medalist(s)	7	Dai Yunqiang	China	44.55	PR, PB
2nd place, silver medalist(s)	8	Athiwat Paeng-Nuea	Thailand	44.67	SB
3rd place, bronze medalist(s)	6	Daniel Romanchuk	United States	45.11	AR
4	5	Nathan Maguire	Great Britain	45.78	
5	4	Yassine Gharbi	Tunisia	45.99	
6	9	Hu Yang	China	46.06	
7	2	Phiphatphong Sianglam	Thailand	46.59	
8	3	Juan Pablo Cervantes García	Mexico	48.45	
