= Athletics at the 2020 Summer Paralympics – Men's marathon T54 =

Men's marathon T54 at the XVI Paralympic Games
- Venue: Tokyo National Stadium
- Dates: 5 September 2021
- Competitors: 15 from 9 nations
- Winning time: 1:24:02

Medalists
1st place, gold medalist(s)		Marcel Hug	Switzerland
2nd place, silver medalist(s)		Zhang Yong	China
3rd place, bronze medalist(s)		Daniel Romanchuk	United States

The men's marathon T54 event at the 2020 Summer Paralympics in Tokyo, took place on 5 September 2021.

The T54 category is for wheelchair athletes with no leg function, but near full arm function and reasonable to normal trunk function. Typically this may be caused by a lower spinal cord injury or spinal cord birth defect.

== Records ==
Prior to the competition, the existing records were as follows:

World Record	Heinz Frei (SUI)	1:20:14	Ōita, Japan	31 October 1999
Paralympic Record	Kurt Fearnley (AUS)	1:23:17	Beijing, China	17 September 2008

Area	Time	Athlete	Nation
Africa	1:23:18	Ernst van Dyk	South Africa
America	1:23:20	Aarón Gordian Martínez	Mexico
Asia	1:21:52	Tomoki Suzuki	Japan
Europe	1:20:14 WR	Heinz Frei	Switzerland
Oceania	1:23:17 PR	Kurt Fearnley	Australia

== Results ==
The race took place on 5 September 2021, at 6:30:

Rank	Name	Nationality	Class	Time	Notes
1st place, gold medalist(s)	Marcel Hug	Switzerland	T54	1:24:02	SB
2nd place, silver medalist(s)	Zhang Yong	China	T54	1:24:22	PB
3rd place, bronze medalist(s)	Daniel Romanchuk	United States	T54	1:29:05	SB
4	Brent Lakatos	Canada	T53	1:29:18	PB
5	David Weir	Great Britain	T54	1:29:45	SB
6	Aaron Pike	United States	T54	1:29:45	SB
7	Tomoki Suzuki	Japan	T54	1:30:45	SB
8	Yang Shaoqiao	China	T53	1:31:27	
9	Dai Yunqiang	China	T54	1:31:27	SB
10	JohnBoy Smith	Great Britain	T54	1:32:25	SB
11	Zhang Ying	China	T54	1:32:26	SB
12	Patrick Monahan	Ireland	T53	1:32:54	SB
13	Vitalii Gritsenko	RPC	T53	1:33:13	SB
14	Yoo Byung-hoon	South Korea	T53	1:41:44	SB
15	Brian Siemann	United States	T53	1:44:42	SB
