= Athletics at the 2020 Summer Paralympics – Men's 1500 metres T54 =

Men's 1500 metres T54 at the XVI Paralympic Games
- Venue: Tokyo National Stadium
- Dates: 30 August 2021 (heats); 31 August 2021 (final)
- Competitors: 19 from 10 nations
- Winning time: 2:49.55

Medalists
1st place, gold medalist(s)		Marcel Hug	Switzerland
2nd place, silver medalist(s)		Prawat Wahoram	Thailand
3rd place, bronze medalist(s)		Putharet Khongrak	Thailand

The men's 1500 metres T54 event at the 2020 Summer Paralympics in Tokyo took place between 30 and 31 August 2021.

The T54 category is for wheelchair athletes with no leg function, but near full arm function and reasonable to normal trunk function. Typically this may be caused by a lower spinal cord injury or spinal cord birth defect.

== Records ==
Prior to the competition, the existing records were as follows:

World Record	Brent Lakatos (CAN)	2:51.84	Nottwil, Switzerland	3 June 2017
Paralympic Record	Prawat Wahoram (THA)	3:00.10	Beijing, China	15 September 2008

Area	Time	Athlete	Nation
Africa	2:54.18	Yassine Gharbi	Tunisia
America	2:51.84 WR	Brent Lakatos	Canada
Asia	2:53.38	Zhang Yong	China
Europe	2:52.11	Richard Chiassaro	Great Britain
Oceania	2:58.88	Jake Lappin	Australia

== Results ==
=== Heats ===
Heat 1 took place on 30 August 2021, at 12:44:

Rank	Athlete	Nation	Class	Time	Notes
1	Prawat Wahoram	Thailand	T54	3:03.07	Q
2	Zhang Yong	China	T54	3:03.45	Q, SB
3	Julien Casoli	France	T54	3:03.48	Q
4	Masayuki Higuchi	Japan	T54	3:03.60	
5	Brent Lakatos	Canada	T53	3:03.72	
6	Brian Siemann	United States	T53	3:03.84	
7	Dai Yunqiang	China	T54	3:04.24	SB
8	Richard Chiassaro	Great Britain	T54	3:05.44	SB
	Alexey Bychenok	RPC	T54	DNS	

Heat 2 took place on 30 August 2021, at 12:51:

Rank	Athlete	Nation	Class	Time	Notes
1	Marcel Hug	Switzerland	T54	2:54.63	Q, GR
2	Zhang Ying	China	T54	2:55.66	Q, PB
3	Daniel Romanchuk	United States	T54	2:55.83	Q
4	David Weir	Great Britain	T54	2:55.84	q
5	Putharet Khongrak	Thailand	T54	2:56.03	q
6	Daniel Sidbury	Great Britain	T54	2:56.26	q, PB
7	Tomoki Suzuki	Japan	T54	2:56.34	q, SB
8	Vitalii Gritsenko	RPC	T53	2:56.96	PB
9	Aaron Pike	United States	T54	2:57.49	
10	Alhassane Baldé	Germany	T54	2:58.92	

=== Final ===
The final took place on 31 August 2021, at 11:46:

Rank	Athlete	Nation	Class	Time	Notes
1st place, gold medalist(s)	Marcel Hug	Switzerland	T54	2:49.55	WR
2nd place, silver medalist(s)	Prawat Wahoram	Thailand	T54	2:50.20	AR
3rd place, bronze medalist(s)	Putharet Khongrak	Thailand	T54	2:50.68	PB
4	Zhang Yong	China	T54	2:50.78	PB
5	Daniel Romanchuk	United States	T54	2:50.86	AR
6	Daniel Sidbury	Great Britain	T54	2:51.11	PB
7	Julien Casoli	France	T54	2:51.69	PB
8	Zhang Ying	China	T54	2:53.26	PB
9	Tomoki Suzuki	Japan	T54	2:53.60	PB
10	David Weir	Great Britain	T54	2:53.84	PB
