= Athletics at the 2020 Summer Paralympics – Men's 800 metres T54 =

Men's 800 metres T54 at the XVI Paralympic Games
- Venue: Tokyo National Stadium
- Dates: 2 September 2021 (final)
- Competitors: 16 from 9 nations
- Winning time: 1:33.68

Medalists
1st place, gold medalist(s)		Marcel Hug	Switzerland
2nd place, silver medalist(s)		Dai Yunqiang	China
3rd place, bronze medalist(s)		Saichon Konjen	Thailand

The men's 800 metres T54 event at the 2020 Summer Paralympics in Tokyo, took place on 2 September 2021.

The T54 category is for wheelchair athletes with no leg function, but near full arm function and reasonable to normal trunk function. Typically this may be caused by a lower spinal cord injury or spinal cord birth defect.

== Records ==
Prior to the competition, the existing records were as follows:

World Record	Daniel Romanchuk (USA)	1:29.54	Arbon, Switzerland	24 May 2021
Paralympic Record	Choke Yasuoka (JPN)	1:32.45	Athens, Greece	25 September 2004

Area	Time	Athlete	Nation
Africa	1:31.24	Yassine Gharbi	Tunisia
America	1:29.54 WR	Daniel Romanchuk	United States
Asia	1:31.41	Zhang Yong	China
Europe	1:30.35	Richard Chiassaro	Great Britain
Oceania	1:32.73	Kurt Fearnley	Australia

== Results ==
=== Heats ===
Heat 1 took place on 2 September 2021, at 11:49:

Rank	Lane	Name	Nationality	Time	Notes
1	5	Prawat Wahoram	Thailand	1:33.59	Q
2	3	Zhang Yong	China	1:33.85	Q, SB
3	8	Aaron Pike	United States	1:36.48	
4	7	Tomoki Suzuki	Japan	1:37.85	
5	6	Kenny van Weeghel	Netherlands	1:40.87	
	4	Richard Chiassaro	Great Britain	DNS	

Heat 2 took place on 2 September 2021, at 11:56:

Rank	Lane	Name	Nationality	Time	Notes
1	5	Marcel Hug	Switzerland	1:34.38	Q
2	4	Putharet Khongrak	Thailand	1:34.96	Q
3	3	Dai Yunqiang	China	1:35.12	q, SB
4	7	Julien Casoli	France	1:35.38	q
5	6	Nathan Maguire	Great Britain	1:36.73	

Heat 3 took place on 2 September 2021, at 12:03:

Rank	Lane	Name	Nationality	Time	Notes
1	5	Daniel Romanchuk	United States	1:31.83	Q, GR
2	7	Saichon Konjen	Thailand	1:37.08	Q
3	4	Song Lei	China	1:37.80	SB
4	3	Alhassane Baldé	Germany	1:41.10	
	6	Danny Sidbury	Great Britain	DQ	

=== Final ===
The final took place on 2 September, at 20:32:

Rank	Lane	Name	Nationality	Time	Notes
1st place, gold medalist(s)	5	Marcel Hug	Switzerland	1:33.68	
2nd place, silver medalist(s)	2	Dai Yunqiang	China	1:34.11	SB
3rd place, bronze medalist(s)	7	Saichon Konjen	Thailand	1:34.19	
4	6	Daniel Romanchuk	United States	1:34.48	
5	8	Zhang Yong	China	1:34.55	
6	4	Prawat Wahoram	Thailand	1:34.58	
7	3	Putharet Khongrak	Thailand	1:35.86	
8	1	Julien Casoli	France	1:39.62	
