= 2023 World Para Athletics Championships – Men's 800 metres =

The men's 800 metres at the 2023 World Para Athletics Championships were held across 3 classifications at Charlety Stadium, Paris, France, on 15 and 17 July.

== Medalists ==
Event	Gold	Silver	Bronze
T34	Walid Ktila; Tunisia	Mohamed Hammadi; United Arab Emirates	Gong Wenhao; China
T53	Brent Lakatos; Canada	Pongsakorn Paeyo; Thailand	Brian Siemann; United States
T54	Marcel Hug; Switzerland	Faisal Alrajehi; Kuwait	Daniel Sidbury; Great Britain

== T34 ==
The event took place on 17 July.

Rank	Lane	Name	Nationality	Time	Notes
1st place, gold medalist(s)	3	Walid Ktila	Tunisia	1:39.23	
2nd place, silver medalist(s)	5	Mohamed Hammadi	United Arab Emirates	1:39.93	
3rd place, bronze medalist(s)	1	Gong Wenhao	China	1:40.13	PB
4	4	Austin Smeenk	Canada	1:40.19	
5	8	Wang Yang	China	1:40.44	
6	6	Chaiwat Rattana	Thailand	1:40.63	
7	2	Rheed McCracken	Australia	1:44.34	
8	7	Roberto Michel	Mauritius	1:44.87	

== T53 ==
The event took place on 15 July.

Rank	Lane	Name	Nationality	Time	Notes
1st place, gold medalist(s)	5	Brent Lakatos	Canada	1:34.31	CR
2nd place, silver medalist(s)	3	Pongsakorn Paeyo	Thailand	1:34.39	
3rd place, bronze medalist(s)	2	Brian Siemann	United States	1:36.65	SB
4	4	Masaberee Arsae	Thailand	1:37.96	
5	8	Pierre Fairbank	France	1:37.96	SB
6	6	Sopa Intasen	Thailand	1:38.15	
7	7	Yoo Byung-hoon	South Korea	1:39.09	SB
8	1	Nicolas Brignone	France	1:41.57	

== T54 ==
The event took place on 17 July.

Rank	Lane	Name	Nationality	Time	Notes
1st place, gold medalist(s)	6	Marcel Hug	Switzerland	1:29.00	CR
2nd place, silver medalist(s)	4	Faisal Alrajehi	Kuwait	1:29.61	
3rd place, bronze medalist(s)	3	Daniel Sidbury	Great Britain	1:29.72 (.711)	
4	1	Hu Yang	China	1:29.72 (.713)	PB
5	5	Nathan Maguire	Great Britain	1:30.12	
6	2	Saichon Konjen	Thailand	1:31.58	
7	7	Prawat Wahoram	Thailand	1:31.76	
8	8	Athiwat Paeng-nuea	Thailand	1:32.02	
