= Athletics at the 2020 Summer Paralympics – Men's 400 metres T54 =

Men's 400 metres T54 at the XVI Paralympic Games
- Venue: Tokyo National Stadium
- Dates: 29 August 2021 (final)
- Competitors: 18 from 12 nations
- Winning time: 45.72

Medalists
1st place, gold medalist(s)		Daniel Romanchuk	United States
2nd place, silver medalist(s)		Athiwat Paeng-Nuea	Thailand
3rd place, bronze medalist(s)		Dai Yunqiang	China

The men's 400 metres T54 event at the 2020 Summer Paralympics in Tokyo, took place on 29 August 2021.

The T54 category is for wheelchair athletes with no leg function, but near full arm function and reasonable to normal trunk function. Typically this may be caused by a lower spinal cord injury or spinal cord birth defect.

== Records ==
Prior to the competition, the existing records were as follows:

World Record	Yassine Gharbi (TUN)	43.46	Sharjah, United Arab Emirates	19 March 2018
Paralympic Record	Zhang Lixin (CHN)	45.07	Beijing, China	10 September 2008

Area	Time	Athlete	Nation
Africa	43.46 WR	Yassine Gharbi	Tunisia
America	45.58	Daniel Romanchuk	United States
Asia	44.84	Zhang Yong	China
Europe	44.39	Richard Chiassaro	Great Britain
Oceania	46.84	Jake Lappin	Australia

== Results ==
=== Heats ===
Heat 1 took place on 29 August 2021, at 11:43:

Rank	Lane	Name	Nationality	Time	Notes
1	6	Daniel Romanchuk	United States	45.31	Q, AR
2	3	Dai Yunqiang	China	46.13	Q, PB
3	8	Saichon Konjen	Thailand	46.49	q, PB
4	5	Nathan Maguire	Great Britain	46.72	q
5	4	Leo-Pekka Tähti	Finland	46.91	
6	7	Sam Carter	Australia	47.06	SB

Heat 2 took place on 29 August 2021, at 11:51:

Rank	Lane	Name	Nationality	Time	Notes
1	6	Putharet Khongrak	Thailand	47.42	Q
2	7	Richard Chiassaro	Great Britain	47.88	Q, SB
3	8	Julien Casoli	France	47.99	SB
4	4	Juan Pablo Cervantes Garcia	Mexico	48.31	
5	5	Liu Yang	China	48.96	SB
	3	Jaenal Aripin	Indonesia	DQ	WPA 17.8

Heat 3 took place on 29 August 2021, at 11:59:

Rank	Lane	Name	Nationality	Time	Notes
1	7	Athiwat Paeng-Nuea	Thailand	44.87	Q, GR
2	6	Zhang Yong	China	46.30	Q, SB
3	3	Kenny van Weeghel	Netherlands	46.81	SB
5	5	Malang Tamba	The Gambia	1:05.71	PB
	4	Alexey Bychenok	RPC	DQ	WPA 17.8
	8	Daniel Sidbury	Great Britain	DQ	WPA 18.5a

=== Final ===
The final took place on 29 August 2021, at 20:21:

Rank	Lane	Name	Nationality	Time	Notes
1st place, gold medalist(s)	5	Daniel Romanchuk	United States	45.72	
2nd place, silver medalist(s)	4	Athiwat Paeng-Nuea	Thailand	45.73	
3rd place, bronze medalist(s)	6	Dai Yunqiang	China	46.20	
4	2	Saichon Konjen	Thailand	46.42	PB
5	9	Zhang Yong	China	47.17	
6	3	Nathan Maguire	Great Britain	47.17	
7	8	Richard Chiassaro	Great Britain	47.37	SB
8	7	Putharet Khongrak	Thailand	47.56	
