= Athletics at the 2020 Summer Paralympics – Men's 5000 metres T54 =

Men's 5000 metres T54 at the XVI Paralympic Games
- Venue: Tokyo National Stadium
- Dates: 27 August 2021 (heats); 28 August 2021 (final)
- Competitors: 17 from 7 nations
- Winning time: 10:29.90

Medalists
1st place, gold medalist(s)		Marcel Hug	Switzerland
2nd place, silver medalist(s)		Brent Lakatos	Canada
3rd place, bronze medalist(s)		Putharet Khongrak	Thailand

The men's 5000 metres T54 event at the 2020 Summer Paralympics in Tokyo took place between 27 and 28 August 2021.

The T54 category is for wheelchair athletes with no leg function, but near full arm function and reasonable to normal trunk function. Typically this may be caused by a lower spinal cord injury or spinal cord birth defect.

== Records ==
Prior to the competition, the existing records were as follows:

World Record	Daniel Romanchuk (USA)	9:42.83	Arbon, Switzerland	2 June 2019
Paralympic Record	Kurt Fearnley (AUS)	10:13.21	Beijing, China	8 September 2008

Area	Time	Athlete	Nation
Africa	9:58.63	Krige Schabort	South Africa
America	9:42.83 WR	Daniel Romanchuk	USA
Asia	9:43.00	Zhang Yong	China
Europe	9:44.01	Marcel Hug	Switzerland
Oceania	9:59.71	Kurt Fearnley	Australia

== Results ==
=== Heats ===
First 3 in each heat (Q) and the next 4 fastest (q) advance to the Final round.

Heat 1 took place on 27 August 2021, at 20:35:

Rank	Athlete	Nation	Class	Time	Notes
1	Marcel Hug	Switzerland	T54	9:53.26	PR, Q
2	Daniel Romanchuk	United States	T54	9:53.38	Q, SB
3	Alexey Bychenok	RPC	T54	10:10.99	Q, SB
4	Putharet Khongrak	Thailand	T54	10:11.36	q
5	Masayuki Higuchi	Japan	T54	10:11.49	q, SB
6	Dai Yunqiang	China	T54	10:14.80	q, SB
7	Hu Yang	China	T54	10:48.73	SB
8	David Weir	Great Britain	T54	10:49.05	
-	Alhassane Baldé	Germany	T54	DNF	

Heat 2 took place on 27 August 2021, at 20:54:

Rank	Athlete	Nation	Class	Time	Notes
1	Prawat Wahoram	Thailand	T54	10:14.91	Q
2	Brent Lakatos	Canada	T53	10:15.15	Q, SB
3	Zhang Yong	China	T54	10:15.46	Q, SB
4	Julien Casoli	France	T54	10:15.73	q, SB
5	Aaron Pike	United States	T54	10:16.48	
6	Brian Siemann	United States	T53	10:20.64	SB
7	Kozo Kubo	Japan	T54	10:21.34	SB
8	Daniel Sidbury	Great Britain	T54	10:26.65	SB

=== Final ===
The final took place on 28 August 2021, at 20:24:

Rank	Athlete	Nation	Class	Time	Notes
1st place, gold medalist(s)	Marcel Hug	Switzerland	T54	10:29.90	
2nd place, silver medalist(s)	Brent Lakatos	Canada	T53	10:30.19	
3rd place, bronze medalist(s)	Putharet Khongrak	Thailand	T54	10:30.37	
4	Daniel Romanchuk	United States	T54	10:30.50	
5	Alexey Bychenok	RPC	T54	10:30.59	
6	Prawat Wahoram	Thailand	T54	10:30.59	
7	Zhang Yong	China	T54	10:30.82	
8	Masayuki Higuchi	Japan	T54	10:31.28	
9	Dai Yunqiang	China	T54	10:33.25	
	Julien Casoli	France	T54	DNF	
