= David Pineda =

Spanish Paralympic athlete (born 1998)

Personal information
- Full name: David José Pineda Mejía
- Nationality: Spanish
- Born: 18 March 1998 (age 28) Dominican Republic
- Home town: Soria, Spain

Sport
- Sport: Para-athletics
- Disability class: T20
- Event: 400 metres
Medal record
Men's para-athletics
Representing Spain
Paralympic Games
Silver medal – second place	2024 Paris	400 m T20
World Championships
Gold medal – first place	2025 New Delhi	400 m T20

David José Pineda Mejía (born 18 March 1998) is a Spanish T20 para-athlete. He represented Spain at the 2024 Summer Paralympics.

== Early life ==
Pineda was born in the Dominican Republic and moved to Soria, Spain, at 12 years old.

== Career ==
Pineda represented Spain at the 2024 Summer Paralympics and won a silver medal in the 400 metres T20 event.
