= Andrii Doroshenko =

Ukrainian Paralympic sport shooter

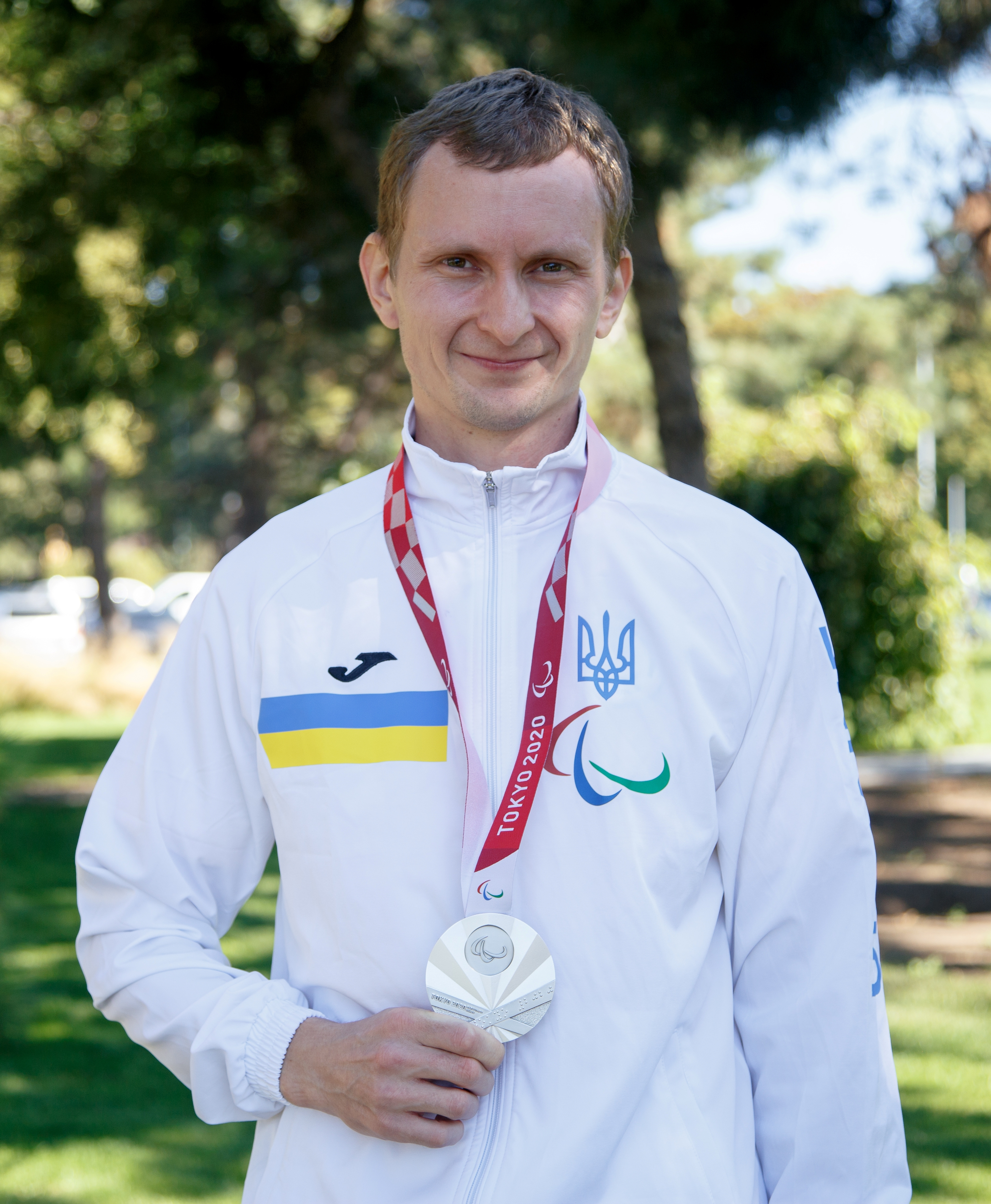

Personal information
- Born: 7 September 1987 (age 37); Rozdilna, Ukraine

Sport
- Country: Ukraine
- Sport: Sport shooting

Andrii Doroshenko (Ukrainian: Андрій Юрійович Дорошенко; born 7 September 1987) is a Ukrainian Paralympic sport shooter. He won the silver medal in the men's 10-metre air rifle standing SH1 event at the 2020 Summer Paralympics held in Tokyo, Japan.

He also represented Ukraine at the 2012 Summer Paralympics held in London, United Kingdom and the 2016 Summer Paralympics held in Rio de Janeiro, Brazil.
