= Daniel Sidbury =

British wheelchair racer (born 1994)

Personal information
- Full name: Daniel Jonathan Sidbury
- Nickname: Danny
- Born: 3 April 1994 (age 32)

Sport
- Disability: Double below knee amputations due to meningitis
- Disability class: T54
Medal record
Men's para athletics
Representing Great Britain
World Championships
Bronze medal – third place	2023 Paris	800 m T54
Bronze medal – third place	2023 Paris	5000 m T54
European Championships
Silver medal – second place	2021 Bydgoszcz	1500 m T54
Representing England
Commonwealth Games
Silver medal – second place	2022 Birmingham	1500 m T54
Silver medal – second place	2026 Glasgow	1500 m T54

Daniel Jonathan Sidbury (born 3 April 1994) is a British wheelchair racer. He won the silver medal in the men's 1500 metres T54 event at the 2022 Commonwealth Games held in Birmingham, England, placing him as the official number two in Great Britain among T54 athletes. He is also a two-time bronze medalist at the 2023 World Para Athletics Championships held in Paris, France.

== Career ==
Sidbury is a T54-classified athlete who competes in wheelchair racing competitions. In 2021, he won the silver medal in the men's 1500 metres T54 event at the World Para Athletics European Championships held in Bydgoszcz, Poland.

In that same year, he represented Great Britain at the 2020 Summer Paralympics held in Tokyo, Japan. He competed in the men's 400 metres T54, men's 800 metres T54, men's 1500 metres T54 and men's 5000 metres T54 events.

At the 2021 European Championships, he won a silver medal in the 1500 metres.

In 2022, he won a silver in the 1500 metres T53/54 at the Commonwealth Games.

In 2023, he won the bronze medal in the men's 5000 metres T54 event and 800 metres at the World Para Athletics Championships held in Paris, France. He finished in 4th place in the men's 400 metres T54 event and 6th in the 1500 metres.

In the 2024 Summer Paralympics, he competed in the 400 metres, 800 metres, 1500 metres and 5000 metres.

== Achievements ==
Year	Competition	Venue	Position	Event	Notes
Representing England
2022	Commonwealth Games	Birmingham, England	2nd	1500 m	3:12.15
Representing Great Britain
2021	World Para Athletics European Championships	Bydgoszcz, Poland	2nd	1500 m	3:05.30
2023	World Para Athletics Championships	Paris, France	3rd	800 m	1:29.72
2023	World Para Athletics Championships	Paris, France	3rd	5000 m	10:15.44
