= Zhang Yong (athlete) =

Chinese Paralympic athlete

Personal information
- Born: 25 May 1992 (age 34) Shangluo, China

Sport
- Country: China
- Sport: Para-athletics
- Disability class: T54
- Events: 400 metres; 800 metres; 1500 metres; 5000 metres; Marathon
Medal record
Paralympic Games
| Silver medal – second place | 2020 Tokyo | Marathon T54 |
World Championships
| Silver medal – second place | 2019 Dubai | 400 m T54 |
| Silver medal – second place | 2019 Dubai | 1500 m T54 |
| Bronze medal – third place | 2019 Dubai | 800 m T54 |
| Bronze medal – third place | 2019 Dubai | 5000 m T54 |

Zhang Yong (born 25 May 1992) is a Chinese Paralympic athlete. He won the silver medal in the men's marathon T54 event at the 2020 Summer Paralympics held in Tokyo, Japan. He also won two silver medals and two bronze medals at the 2019 World Para Athletics Championships held in Dubai, United Arab Emirates.

At the 2020 Summer Paralympics, he also competed in the men's 400 metres T54, men's 800 metres T54, men's 1500 metres T54 and men's 5000 metres T54 events.
