= Thailand at the 2020 Summer Paralympics =

- Flag of Thailand
- IPC code: THA
- NPC: Paralympic Committee of Thailand

in Tokyo, Japan 24 August 2021 – 5 September 2021
- Competitors: 76 in 14 sports
- Flag bearer: Pongsakorn Paeyo / Subin Tipmanee
- Medals Ranked 25th: Gold 5 Silver 5 Bronze 8 Total 18

Summer Paralympics appearances (overview)
- 1984; 1988; 1992; 1996; 2000; 2004; 2008; 2012; 2016; 2020; 2024

Thailand competed at the 2020 Summer Paralympics from 24 August to 5 September 2021. This was the country's tenth appearance at the Paralympic Games.

== Medalists ==
Medal	Name	Sport	Event	Date
Gold	Pongsakorn Paeyo	Athletics	Men's 400 metres T53	29 August
Gold	Pongsakorn Paeyo	Athletics	Men's 100 metres T53	1 September
Gold	Athiwat Paeng-nuea	Athletics	Men's 100 metres T54	1 September
Gold	Pongsakorn Paeyo	Athletics	Men's 800 metres T53	2 September
Gold	Witsanu Huadpradit; Subin Tipmanee; Watcharaphon Vongsa; Worawut Saengampa	Boccia	Mixed team BC1–2	4 September
Silver	Athiwat Paeng-nuea	Athletics	Men's 400 metres T54	29 August
Silver	Prawat Wahoram	Athletics	Men's 1500 metres T54	31 August
Silver	Pornchok Larpyen	Boccia	Mixed individual BC4	1 September
Silver	Watcharaphon Vongsa	Boccia	Mixed individual BC2	1 September
Silver	Sujirat Pookkham	Badminton	Women's singles WH1	4 September
Bronze	Saysunee Jana	Wheelchair fencing	Women's épée B	26 August
Bronze	Rungroj Thainiyom	Table tennis	Men's individual – Class 6	28 August
Bronze	Putharet Khongrak	Athletics	Men's 5000 metres T54	28 August
Bronze	Putharet Khongrak	Athletics	Men's 1500 metres T54	31 August
Bronze	Anurak Laowong; Yuttajak Glinbancheun; Thirayu Chueawong	Table tennis	Men's team – Class 3	1 September
Bronze	Khwansuda Phuangkitcha	Taekwondo	Women's 49 kg	2 September
Bronze	Saichon Konjen	Athletics	Men's 800 metres T54	2 September
Bronze	Sujirat Pookkham; Amnouy Wetwithan	Badminton	Women's doubles WH1–WH2	5 September

== Competitors ==
Sport	Men	Women	Total
Archery	3	2	5
Athletics	9	4	13
Badminton	3	4	7
Boccia	6	4	10
Cycling	1	0	1
Football 5-a-side	10	0	10
Judo	0	1	1
Powerlifting	2	1	3
Shooting	3	2	5
Swimming	3	1	4
Table Tennis	8	4	12
Taekwondo	0	1	1
Wheelchair Fencing	0	1	1
Wheelchair Tennis	2	1	3
Total	50	26	76

== Archery ==
Thailand have secured three quotas in men's archery following success in the 2019 World Para Archery Championship in 's-Hertogenbosch, the Netherlands. Two quotas in men's events won by two compound archers, Anon Aungaphinan (sixth place in the secondary tournament) and Singpirom Comsan (seventh place in the secondary tournament). Another quota won by Rio games silver medal recurve archer, Hanreuchai Netsiri (champion in the secondary tournament).

Thailand have secured another quota in women's archery following success in the 2019 Asia Continental Qualification Tournament in Bangkok, Thailand. A quota in women's events won by a recurve archer, Pattawaeo Phattharaphon.

Under Paralympic qualification rules, an NPC that has qualified an archer both men's and women's events in the same category will enter a mixed team (1 male, 1 female) into the relevant team event.

Compound open

Athlete	Events	Ranking round		Round of 32	Round of 16	Quarterfinals	Semifinals	Finals	Rank
Athlete	Events	Score	Seed	Opposition Score	Opposition Score	Opposition Score	Opposition Score	Opposition Score	Rank
Anon Aungaphinan	Men's individual	686	15	Bye	van Montague (BEL); L 130–143	Did not advance			
Comsan Singpirom	Men's individual	671	27	Bye	Xinliang (CHN); L 140–142	Did not advance			
Praphaporn Homjanthuek	Women's individual	643	23	—N/a	Yorulmaz (TUR); L 133–133	Did not advance			
Praphaporn Homjanthuek; Anon Aungaphinan; Comsan Singpirom	Compound open	—N/a				India; L 141-147	Did not advance		

Recurve open

Athlete	Events	Ranking round		Round of 16	Quarterfinals	Semifinals	Finals	Rank
Athlete	Events	Score	Seed	Opposition Score	Opposition Score	Opposition Score	Opposition Score	Rank
Hanreuchai Netsiri	Men's individual	632	4	Szarszewski (GER); L 133–133	Did not advance			
Phattharaphon Pattawaeo	Women's individual	599	6	Dergovics (BRA); L 1–7	Did not advance			
Phattharaphon Pattawaeo; Hanreuchai Netsiri	Recurve open	—N/a		South Korea; L 4–5	Did not advance			

== Athletics ==
Four male wheelchair racers and two female runners secure nine quotas following success in the 2019 World Para Athletics Championships in Dubai, the United Arab Emirates. At this event, the top four ranked athletes in each individual events will obtain one qualification slot for their respective National Paralympic Committee, in the case that an athlete is ranked first to fourth in more than one medal event, the athlete can only obtain one qualification slot for their National Paralympic Committee.

On 8 November, Pongsakorn Paeyo qualified by winning a bronze medal in men's 100 metres T53 Then, He qualified by winning in men's 400 metres T53 on 9 November. Chaiwat Rattana qualified by winning the fourth place in men's 100 metres T34, on 10 November. Suneeporn Tanomwong and her guide Patchai Srikhamphan won a bronze medal and qualified women's 400 metres T11 in the same day. On 11 November, Prawat Wahoram and Rawat Tana are athletes qualified in men's 1500 metres T54 after winning a gold medal and fourth place respectively. Another quota Pongsakorn qualified is men's 800 metres T53 after he won a silver medal on 12 November. On 13 November, Prawat won a gold medal again and qualified men's 5000 metres T54. The last quota of this events won by Orawan Kaising after winning the fourth place in women's 400 metres T20 on 15 November.

Track events
Men

Athlete	Events	Heat		Semifinal		Final	
Athlete	Events	Time	Rank	Time	Rank	Time	Rank
Chaiwat Rattana	100 metres T34	—N/a				15.87	6
Chaiwat Rattana	800 metres T34	1:53.75	5	—N/a		Did not advance	
Pongsakorn Paeyo	100 metres T53	14.30 PR	1 Q	—N/a		14.20 PR	1st place, gold medalist(s)
Pongsakorn Paeyo	400 metres T53	47.31 PR	1 Q	—N/a		46.61 WR	1st place, gold medalist(s)
Pongsakorn Paeyo	800 metres T53	1:40.28 PR	1 Q	—N/a		1:36.07 PR	1st place, gold medalist(s)
Pichet Krungget	100 metres T53	15.30	4 q	—N/a		15.43	6
Pichet Krungget	400 metres T53	48.70	2 Q	—N/a		49.96	5
Pichet Krungget	800 metres T53	1:40.90	2 Q	—N/a		1:40.09	5
Masaberee Arsae	400 metres T53	DQ		—N/a		Did not advance	
Masaberee Arsae	800 metres T53	1:40.90	2 Q	—N/a		1:42.09	7
Athiwat Paeng-nuea	100 metres T54	14.00	1 Q	—N/a		13.76 AR	1st place, gold medalist(s)
Athiwat Paeng-nuea	400 metres T54	44.87 PR	1 Q	—N/a		45.73	2nd place, silver medalist(s)
Saichon Konjen	100 metres T54	14.39	5	—N/a		did not advance	
Saichon Konjen	400 metres T54	46.49	3 q	—N/a		46.42	4
Saichon Konjen	800 metres T54	1:37.08	2 Q	—N/a		1:34.19	3rd place, bronze medalist(s)
Putharet Khongrak	400 metres T54	47.42	1 Q	—N/a		47.56	8
Putharet Khongrak	800 metres T54	1:34.96	2 Q	—N/a		1:35.86	7
Putharet Khongrak	1500 metres T54	2:56.03	4 q	—N/a		2:50.68 PB	3rd place, bronze medalist(s)
Putharet Khongrak	5000 metres T54	10:11.36	4 q	—N/a		10:30.37	3rd place, bronze medalist(s)
Prawat Wahoram	800 metres T54	1:33.59	1 Q	—N/a		1:34.58	6
Prawat Wahoram	1500 metres T54	3:03.07	1 Q	—N/a		2:50.20 AR	2nd place, silver medalist(s)
Prawat Wahoram	5000 metres T54	10:14.91	1 Q	—N/a		10:30.59	6

Women

Athlete	Events	Heat		Semifinal		Final	
Athlete	Events	Time	Rank	Time	Rank	Time	Rank
Suneeporn Tanomwong	200 metres T11	27.33	2	Did not advance			
Suneeporn Tanomwong	400 metres T11	DNS		Did not advance			
Orawan Kaising	400 metres T20	1:03.06	5	—N/a		Did not advance	
Pagjiraporn Gagun	100 metres T47	13.25	7	—N/a		Did not advance	
Pagjiraporn Gagun	200 metres T47	27.83	5	—N/a		Did not advance	

Field events
Men

Athlete	Events	Result	Rank
Angkarn Chanaboon	High jump T47	1.89	7

Women

Athlete	Events	Result	Rank
Janjira Panyatib	Long jump T11	4.32	8

== Badminton ==
Men

Athlete	Event	Group stage				Quarterfinal	Semifinal	Final / BM	
Athlete	Event	Opposition Score	Opposition Score	Opposition Score	Rank	Opposition Score	Opposition Score	Opposition Score	Rank
Jakarin Homhual	Singles WH1	Lee D-s (KOR); L (21–23, 16–21)	Wandschneider (GER); W (21–19, 17–21, 21–12)	—N/a	2 Q	Lee S-s (KOR); L (14–21, 16–21)	did not advance		
Dumnern Junthong	Singles WH2	Rooke (GBR); L (21-18, 15-21, 12-21)	Mai (CHN); L (12–21, 6–21)	—N/a	3	did not advance			
Siripong Teamarrom	Singles SL4	Dhillon (IND); L (7-21, 13-21)	Setiawan (INA); L (17–21, 11–21)	Shin (KOR); L (17–21, 8–21)	4	—N/a	did not advance		
Jakarin Homhual; Dumern Junthong	Doubles WH1–WH2	Lee D-s / Kim (KOR); L (19–21, 12–21)	Toupé / Jakobs (FRA); W (21–11, 21–19)	—N/a	2 Q	—N/a	Lee D-s / Kim (KOR); L (18–21, 13–21)	Murayama / Kajiwara (JPN); L (18–21, 19–21)	4

Women

Athlete	Event	Group stage				Quarterfinal	Semifinal	Final / BM	
Athlete	Event	Opposition Score	Opposition Score	Opposition Score	Rank	Opposition Score	Opposition Score	Opposition Score	Rank
Sujirat Pookkham	Singles WH1	Mathez (SUI); W (21–12, 21–15)	Gorodetzky (ISR); W (21–4, 21–9)	Zhang (CHN); W (21–4, 21–19)	1 Q	Bye	Zhang (CHN); W (21–11, 21–7)	Satomi (JPN); L (21–14, 19–21, 13–21)	2nd place, silver medalist(s)
Amnouy Wetwithan	Singles WH2	Ogura (JPN); W (14–21, 17–21)	Xu (CHN); L (16–21, 3–21)	—N/a	2 Q	Seçkin (TUR); L (10–21, 15–21)	did not advance		
Chanida Srinavakul	Singles SL4	Meier (CAN); W (22–20, 20–22, 21–13)	Dransfield (AUS); W (21–8, 21–16)	Sagøy (NOR); L (14–21, 8–21)	2	—N/a	did not advance		
Nipada Saensupa	Singles SL4	Fujino (JPN); L (17–21, 10–21)	Ma (CHN); L (10–21, 0^{r}–0)	—N/a	3	—N/a	did not advance		
Sujirat Pookkham; Amnouy Wetwithan	Doubles WH1–WH2	Kang / Lee S-a (KOR); W (21–9, 21–16)	Satomi / Yamazaki (JPN); L (16–21, 9–21)	—N/a	2 Q	—N/a	Satomi / Yamazaki (JPN); L (17–21, 16–21)	Mathez / Suter-Erath (SUI); W (21–11, 21–12)	3rd place, bronze medalist(s)
Nipada Saensupa; Chanida Srinavakul	Doubles SL3–SU5	Oktila / Sadiyah (INA); L (9–21, 13–21)	Ito / Suzuki (JPN); L (11–21, 17–21)	—N/a	3	—N/a	did not advance		

Mixed

Athlete	Event	Group stage			Semifinal	Final / BM	
Athlete	Event	Opposition Score	Opposition Score	Rank	Opposition Score	Opposition Score	Rank
Siripong Teamarrom; Nipada Saensupa	Doubles SL3–SU5	Mazur / Noël (FRA); L (18–21, 18–21)	Bhagat / Kohli (IND); L (15–21, 19–21)	3	did not advance		

== Boccia ==
Eight National Paralympic Committee quotas and three individual athlete quotas were secured. Any athlete qualified via a National Paralympic Committee quota must participate in pairs and team events. The National Paralympic Committee that qualified in pairs and team events can enter one athlete in each individual event.

Four quotas were secured following success in the 2019 BISFed Boccia Asia/Oceania Championships in Seoul, South Korea. At this event, the winners in each regional championship excluding the host country, Japan in pairs and team events will obtain one qualification slot for their respective National Paralympic Committee not to individual athlete. On 7 July, Worawut Saengampa won a gold medal in the event of mixed individual BC1 and made the first quota of Thai boccia. A quota of mixed team BC1–2 is secured after Thailand won South Korea by 12–1 in the final match with a team made up of Witsanu Huadpradit, Natthawut Deemak, Subin Tipmanee, Worawut Saengampa, and Watcharaphon Vongsa on 9 July.

The BISFed world ranking for the paralympic qualifiers was released on 31 December 2019. For pairs and team events, the six highest ranked, not otherwise qualified, will obtain one qualification slot for their respective National Paralympic Committee. For individual events, the four highest ranked and the highest female athletes whose National Paralympic Committee are not qualified for pairs and team events will obtain one qualification slot via an individual quota. Thailand secured seven quotas from two pairs and five individual events. Three of five are individual athlete quotas by Witsanu Huadpradit in BC1, Worawut Saengampa in BC2, and Pornchok Larpyen in BC4.

Individual

Athletes	Events	Pool matches					Quarterfinals	Semifinals	Final / BM	
Athletes	Events	Opposition Score	Opposition Score	Opposition Score	Opposition Score	Rank	Opposition Score	Opposition Score	Opposition Score	Rank
Witsanu Huadpradit	Mixed BC1	Oliveira (BRA); W 5−4	Curinova (CZE); W 9−4	Wei L C (MAS); L 3–3*	Jung S (KOR); W 3−2	2 Q	Smith (GBR); L 1−6	Did not advance		
Subin Tipmanee	Mixed BC1	Gutnik (RPC); L 1−11	Perez (NED); L 0−11	Dolgova (RPC); W 6−0	Moraes (BRA); L 1−4	5	Did not advance			
Worawut Saengampa	Mixed BC2	Hipwell (GBR); W 16−0	Rombouts (BEL); W 2*−2	Mezik (SVK); W 10−4	—N/a	1 Q	Lan Z (CHN); W 8−5	Vongsa (THA); L 3−4	Santos (BRA); L 3−4	4
Watcharaphon Vongsa	Mixed BC2	Fernandes (POR); W 9−0	Faria (BRA); W 14−0	Levi (ISR); W 10−0	—N/a	1 Q	Kozmin (RPC); W 6−4	Saengampa (THA); W 4−3	Sugimura (JPN); L 0−5	2nd place, silver medalist(s)
Somboon Chaipanich	Mixed BC3	Michel (AUS); L 0−9	de Oliveira (BRA); L 1−8	Bjurstrom (SWE); L 0−7	—N/a	4	Did not advance			
Pornchok Larpyen	Mixed BC4	Somsanuk (THA); W 4−1	Saunders (GBR); W 7−1	Andrejcik (SVK); W 4−1	—N/a	1 Q	Grisales (COL); W 6−3	Leung Y W (HKG); W 6−3	Andrejcik (SVK); L 0−4	2nd place, silver medalist(s)
Ritthikrai Somsanuk	Mixed BC4	Larpyen (THA); L 1−4	Andrejcik (SVK); L 0−8	Saunders (GBR); W 9−0	—N/a	3	Did not advance			

Pairs

Athletes	Events	Pool matches					Semifinals	Final / BM	
Athletes	Events	Opposition Score	Opposition Score	Opposition Score	Opposition Score	Rank	Opposition Score	Opposition Score	Rank
Somboon Chaipanich; Ladamanee Kla-han; Ekkarat Chaemchoi	Mixed BC3	Greece; L 2–5	France; W 4–2	South Korea; L 1–4	Great Britain; W 7–3	3	did not advance		
Ritthikrai Somsanuk; Pornchok Larpyen; Nuanchan Phonsila	Mixed BC4	Colombia; W 3–2	Japan; W 8–2	RPC; L 2–5	Hong Kong; L 1–5	3	did not advance		

Team

Athletes	Event	Pool matches					Semifinals	Final / BM	
Athletes	Event	Opposition Score	Opposition Score	Opposition Score	Opposition Score	Rank	Opposition Score	Opposition Score	Rank
Witsanu Huadpradit; Watcharaphon Vongsa; Worawut Saengampa; Subin Tipmanee	Mixed BC1–2	Argentina; W 11–2	Great Britain; W 9–2	RPC; W 13–0	China; L 3–6	2 Q	Japan; W 8–3	China; W 8–2	1st place, gold medalist(s)

== Cycling ==
Thailand have nominated one cyclists to take part in the cycling events at the 2020 Paralympic Games.

Athlete	Event	Time	Rank
Phongchai Yanaruedee	Men's road race H1–2	DNF	–
Phongchai Yanaruedee	Men's time trial H2	1:30:40.98	6

== Football 5-a-side ==
Thailand qualified to compete in football 5-a-side at the 2020 Summer Paralympics for the first time after Iran withdrew. The following is the Thailand squad in the football 5-a-side tournament of the 2020 Summer Paralympics.

No.	Pos.	Player	Class	Date of birth (age)
1	GK	Ponchai Kasikonudompaisan	Sighted	29 February 1992 (aged 29)
2	GK	Worasan Phansawad	Sighted	24 May 1971 (aged 50)
4	DF	Bancha Munphet	B1	29 August 1999 (aged 21)
7		Panyawut Kupan	B1	9 May 1994 (aged 27)
8		Kittithat Wimolwan	B1	15 August 1997 (aged 24)
9	FW	Kittikorn Baodee	B1	26 September 1992 (aged 28)
10		Prakrong Buayai	B1	31 December 1988 (aged 32)
11		Suriya Yingchuros	B1	15 November 1987 (aged 33)
13		Terdkiat Boontiang	B1	30 October 1989 (aged 31)
15		Sanan Phetkrachangsuk	B1	14 October 1996 (aged 24)

Team	Event	Group stage				Semifinal	Final / BM	
Team	Event	Opposition Score	Opposition Score	Opposition Score	Rank	Opposition Score	Opposition Score	Rank
Thailand men's	Men's tournament	Spain; L 0–1	Morocco; L 0–2	Argentina; L 0–3	4	Did not advance	Seventh place match France; W 3–2	7

== Judo ==
Athlete	Event	Preliminaries	Quarterfinals	Semifinals	Repechage First round	Repechage Final	Final / BM	
Athlete	Event	Opposition Result	Opposition Result	Opposition Result	Opposition Result	Opposition Result	Opposition Result	Rank
Methini Wongchomphu	Women's 52 kg	Nikolaychyk (UKR); L 00–10	Did not advance					

== Powerlifting ==
Athlete	Event	Total lifted	Rank
Narong Kasanun	Men's -65 kg	155	6
Thongsa Marasri	Men's -72 kg	180	4
Somkhoun Anon	Women's -61 kg	–	NM

== Shooting ==
Two Thai shooters competed after qualifying in Men's 10m Air Rifle Standing SH1 & Women's 10m Air Rifle Standing SH1 events. The shooters are Wiraphon Mansing & Wannipa Leungvilai.

Athlete	Event	Qualification		Final	
Athlete	Event	Score	Rank	Score	Rank
Anuson Chaichamnan	Mixed 10 m air rifle standing SH2	620.6	25	Did not advance	
Anuson Chaichamnan	Mixed 10 m air rifle prone SH2	632.5	17	Did not advance	
Anuson Chaichamnan	Mixed 50 m rifle prone SH2	614.7	25	Did not advance	
Atidet Intanon	Men's 10 m air rifle standing SH1	607.3	14	Did not advance	
Atidet Intanon	Men's 50 m rifle 3 positions SH1	1142.0	12	Did not advance	
Atidet Intanon	Mixed 10 m air rifle prone SH1	634.1	6 Q	125.4	8
Atidet Intanon	Mixed 50 m rifle prone SH1	612.8	23	Did not advance	
Phiraphong Buengbok	Men's 10 m air rifle standing SH1	606.8	15	Did not advance	
Phiraphong Buengbok	Men's 50 m rifle 3 positions SH1	1112.0	19	Did not advance	
Chutima Saenlar	Women's 10 m air rifle standing SH1	603.4	21	Did not advance	
Chutima Saenlar	Women's 50 m rifle 3 positions SH1	1120.0	16	Did not advance	
Chutima Saenlar	Mixed 10 m air rifle prone SH1	623.3	44	Did not advance	
Chutima Saenlar	Mixed 50 m rifle prone SH1	594.9	48	Did not advance	
Wannipa Leungvilai	Women's 10 m air rifle standing SH1	614.5	12	Did not advance	
Wannipa Leungvilai	Women's 50 m rifle 3 positions SH1	1147.0	8 Q	395.6	8
Wannipa Leungvilai	Mixed 10 m air rifle prone SH1	630.8	20	Did not advance	
Wannipa Leungvilai	Mixed 50 m rifle prone SH1	605.3	43	Did not advance	

== Swimming ==
Two Thai swimmer has successfully entered the paralympic slot after breaking the MQS.

Men

Athlete	Events	Heats		Final	
Athlete	Events	Time	Rank	Time	Rank
Phuchit Aingchayaiphum	100 m freestyle	1:20.97	12	Did not advance	
Phuchit Aingchayaiphum	200 m freestyle	2:59.32	5	Did not advance	
Charkorn Kaewsri	50 m freestyle S3	55.61	5	Did not advance	
Charkorn Kaewsri	50 m backstroke S3	57.81	5	Did not advance	
Charkorn Kaewsri	50 m breaststroke SB2	DQ		Did not advance	
Charkorn Kaewsri	150 m individual medley SM3	3:47.52	9	Did not advance	
Voravit Kaewkham	100 m breaststroke SB4	1:57.55	5	Did not advance	

Women

Athlete	Events	Heats		Final	
Athlete	Events	Time	Rank	Time	Rank
Anchaya Ketkaew	100 m freestyle S9	1:09.51	6	Did not advance	

== Table tennis ==
Eight quotas including five in men's and three in women's were secured following success in the 2019 ITTF Asian Para Championships in Taichung, Chinese Taipei and ITTF World Ranking Allocation released on 30 June 2020.

Men's singles

Athlete	Events	Preliminary round			Round of 16	Quarterfinals	Semifinals	Finals	Rank
Athlete	Events	Opposition Score	Opposition Score	Rank	Opposition Score	Opposition Score	Opposition Score	Opposition Score	Rank
Thirayu Chueawong	Class 2	Ludrovský (SVK); L 1–3	Flores (CHI); L 2–3	3	Did not advance				=13
Anurak Laowong	Class 3	Merrien (FRA); L 0–3	Copola (ARG); L 2–3	3	Did not advance				=15
Yuttajak Glinbancheun	Class 3	Oehgern (SWE); W WO	De Freitas (BRA); W 3–0	1 Q	Copola (ARG); W 3–0	Feng (CHN); L 0–3	Did not advance		=5
Wanchai Chaiwut	Class 4	Trávníček (SVK); L 2–3	Guo (CHN); W 3–2	2 Q	Żyłka (POL); L 0–3	Dis not advance			=9
Rungroj Thainiyom	Class 6	Eminovic (BIH); W 3–0	Rau (GER); W 3–0	1 Q	Bye	Simion (ROU); W 3–2	Rosenmeier (DEN); L 1–3	Did not advance	3rd place, bronze medalist(s)
Chalermpong Punpoo	Class 7	Bayley (GBR); L 0–3	Chudzicki (POL); L 0–3	3	Did not advance				=11
Komkrit Charitsat	Class 8	Andersson (SWE); L 0–3	Bouvais (FRA); L 0–3	3	Did not advance				=15
Phisit Wangphonphathanasiri	Class 8	Zhao (CHN); L 0–3	Zborai (HUN); W 0–3	2 Q	Peng (CHN); L 0–3	Did not advance			=9

Women's singles

Athlete	Events	Preliminary round			Round of 16	Quarterfinals	Semifinals	Finals	Rank
Athlete	Events	Opposition Score	Opposition Score	Rank	Opposition Score	Opposition Score	Opposition Score	Opposition Score	Rank
Chilchitparyak Bootwansirina	Class 1–2	Liu (CHN); L 0–3	Prvulović (SRB); L 0–3	3	—N/a	Did not advance			=9
Dararat Asayut	Class 3	Ahlquist (SWE); L 1–3	Altıntaş (TUR); W 3–1	2 Q	Li (CHN); W 3–1	Xue (CHN); L 1–3	Did not advance		=5
Wijittra Jaion	Class 4	Zhang (CHN); L 2–3	Vasileva (RPC); W 3–0	2 Q	Matić (SRB); L 2–3	Did not advance			=9
Sringam Panwas	Class 5	Abu Awad (JOR); L 0–3	Tabib (ISR); W 3–0	2 Q	—N/a	Jung (KOR); L 1–3	Did not advance		=5

Men's team

Athletes	Events	Quarterfinals	Semifinals	Finals	Rank
Athletes	Events	Opposition Score	Opposition Score	Opposition Score	Rank
Thirayu Chueawong; Yuttajak Glinbancheun; Anurak Laowong	Class 3	South Korea; W 2–0	China; L 0–2	Did not advance	3rd place, bronze medalist(s)
Rungroj Thainiyom; Chalermpong Punpoo	Class 6–7	Germany; L 1–2	did not advance		=5
Komkrit Charitsat; Phisit Wangphonphathanasiri	Class 8	China; L 0–2	did not advance		=5

Women's team

Athletes	Events	Quarterfinals	Semifinals	Finals	Rank
Athletes	Events	Opposition Score	Opposition Score	Opposition Score	Rank
Chilchitparyak Bootwansirina; Dararat Asayut	Class 1–3	Italy; L 1–2	did not advance		=5
Wijittra Jaion; Sringam Panwas	Class 4–5	Sweden; L 0–2	did not advance		=5

== Taekwondo ==
Para taekwondo makes its debut appearance in the Paralympic programme, Khwansuda Phuangkitcha qualified to the 2020 Summer Paralympics via World Ranking.

Athlete	Event	Preliminaries	Quarterfinals	Semifinals	Repechage First round	Repechage Second round	Final / BM	
Athlete	Event	Opposition Result	Opposition Result	Opposition Result	Opposition Result	Opposition Result	Opposition Result	Rank
Khwansuda Phuangkitcha	Women's –49 kg	Fataliyeva (AZE); W 17–4	Çavdar (TUR); L 13–34	Did not advance	Jovanović (SRB); W 35–3	Enkhtuya (MGL); W 33–30	Isakova (UZB); W 18–2	3rd place, bronze medalist(s)

== Wheelchair tennis ==
Thailand qualified three players entries for wheelchair tennis. Two of them qualified by world ranking, while the other qualified by received the bipartite commission invitation allocation quotas.

Athlete	Event	Round of 64	Round of 32	Round of 16	Quarterfinals	Semifinals	Final / BM	Rank
Athlete	Event	Opposition Result	Opposition Result	Opposition Result	Opposition Result	Opposition Result	Opposition Result	Rank
Suthi Khlongrua	Men's singles	Fabisiak (POL); L 6–4, 2–6, 1–6	Did not advance					=33
Banjob Suwan	Men's singles	Francesc (ESP); L 1–6, 4–6	Did not advance					=33
Sakhorn Khanthasit	Women's singles	—N/a	Huang (CHN); W 6–2, 6–4	Mathewson (USA); L 2–6, 4–6	Did not advance			=9
Suthi Khlongrua; Banjob Suwan	Men's doubles	—N/a	Arai / Miki (JPN); L 6–7 (2–7), 3–6	Did not advance				=17

== Wheelchair fencing ==
Thailand qualified one player entry for wheelchair fencing.

Women's individual

Athlete	Events	Preliminary round							Quarterfinals	Semifinals	Finals	Rank
Athlete	Events	Opposition Score	Opposition Score	Opposition Score	Opposition Score	Opposition Score	Opposition Score	Rank	Opposition Score	Opposition Score	Opposition Score	Rank
Saysunee Jana	Èpée Class B	Fedota (UKR); W 5–2	Pasquino (ITA); W 5–3	Tan (CHN); L 1–5	Vasileva (RPC); L 4–5	Dani (HUN); W 5–0	Geddes (USA); W 5–0	2 Q	Makrytskaya (BLR); W 15–5	Tan (CHN); L 9–15	Zhou (CHN); W 15–8	3rd place, bronze medalist(s)
Saysunee Jana	Sabre Class B	Hayes (USA); W 5–0	Xiao (CHN); L 3–5	Khetsuriani (GEO); W 5–4	Tauber (GER); W 5–4	Pasquino (ITA); L 3–5	—N/a	4 Q	Tan (CHN); L 11–15	Did not advance		7

== See also ==
- Thailand at the Paralympics
- Thailand at the 2020 Summer Olympics
