= Zachary Gingras =

Canadian Paralympic athlete (born 2001)

Personal information
- Full name: Zachary Gingras
- Nationality: Canadian
- Born: 30 July 2001 (age 25) Markham
- Height: 6 ft 4 in (193 cm)
- Weight: 183 lb (83 kg)

Sport
- Sport: Paralympic athletics
- Disability class: T38
- Events: 200m, 400m, 800m
- Club: I Be Fast Track Club: Toronto, ON, CAN
- Coached by: Heather Hennigar [national], CAN
Medal record
Men's Paralympic athletics
Representing Canada
Paralympic Games
Bronze medal – third place	2020 Tokyo	400 m T38
World Championships
Silver medal – second place	2023 Paris	400 m T38
Parapan American Games
Silver medal – second place	2019 Lima	400 m T38
Commonwealth Games
Bronze medal – third place	2026 Glasgow	100 m T38

Zachary Gingras (born 30 July 2001) is a Canadian Paralympic athlete.

== Career ==
He started para athletics aged 15 in Toronto. Gingras has played for the Canadian Para Soccer Team. At the Parapan American Games in Lima, his major Games debut, he raced to a silver medal in the T38 400m final with a time of 53.16 seconds, a personal best. His debut Paralympic appearance representing Canada at the 2020 Summer Paralympics.

He secured his first-ever Paralympic medal men's T38 400m event with a lifetime-best of 50.85 seconds, during the 2020 Summer Paralympics.

Mayor Frank Scarpitti the Mayor of Markham proclaimed 31 August 2021 as 'Zachary Gingras Day'.

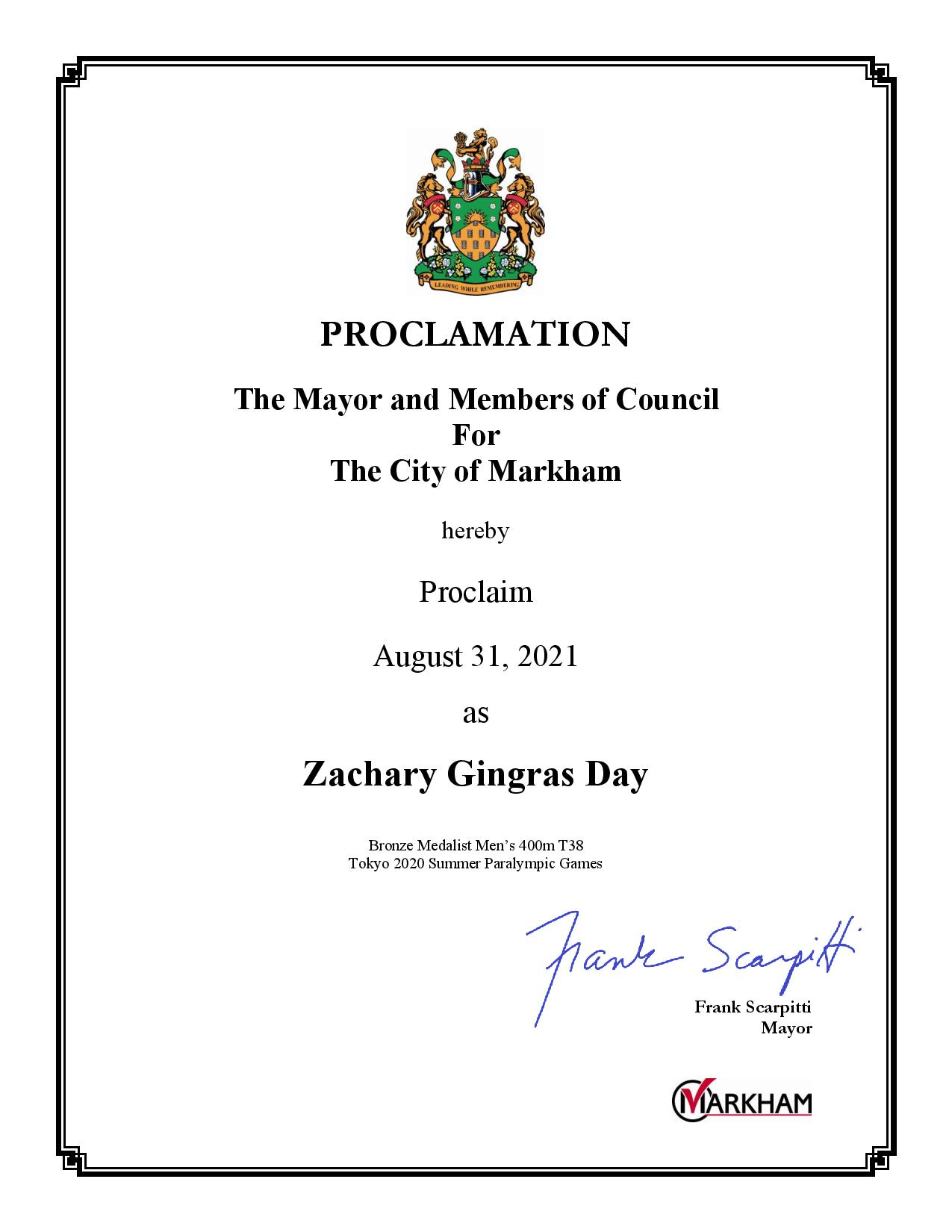
Proclamation of Zachary Gingras Day in the City of Markham by Mayor Frank Scarpitti

== Personal history ==
Gingras lives with cerebral palsy. He is a computer science student at the University of Victoria.
