= Dai Yunqiang =

Chinese Paralympic athlete

Personal information
- Native name: 代云强
- Born: 20 July 1990 (age 36) Qingdao, China

Sport
- Country: China
- Sport: Para-athletics
- Disability class: T54
Medal record
Men's para athletics
Representing China
Paralympic Games
Gold medal – first place	2024 Paris	400 m T54
Silver medal – second place	2020 Tokyo	800 m T54
Silver medal – second place	2024 Paris	800 m T54
Bronze medal – third place	2020 Tokyo	400 m T54
Bronze medal – third place	2024 Paris	1500 m T54
World Championships
Gold medal – first place	2024 Kobe	800 m T54
Silver medal – second place	2024 Kobe	400 m T54
Silver medal – second place	2024 Kobe	1500 m T54
Silver medal – second place	2025 New Delhi	800 m T54
Bronze medal – third place	2023 Paris	400 m T54
Bronze medal – third place	2025 New Delhi	400 m T54
Asian Para Games
Bronze medal – third place	2022 Hangzhou	400m T54

Dai Yunqiang( Chinese: 代云强)(born 20 July 1990) is a Chinese Paralympic athlete. He is a Paralympic Games and World Para Athletics Championships gold medalist.

== Career ==
He won the silver medal in the men's 800 metres T54 event at the 2020 Summer Paralympics held in Tokyo, Japan. He also won the bronze medal in the men's 400 metres T54 event.

He also competed in the men's 1500 metres T54, men's 5000 metres T54 and men's marathon T54 events.

In 2023, he won the bronze medal in the men's 400 metres T54 event at the World Para Athletics Championships held in Paris, France.
