= Brian Siemann =

American Paralympic athlete (born 1989)

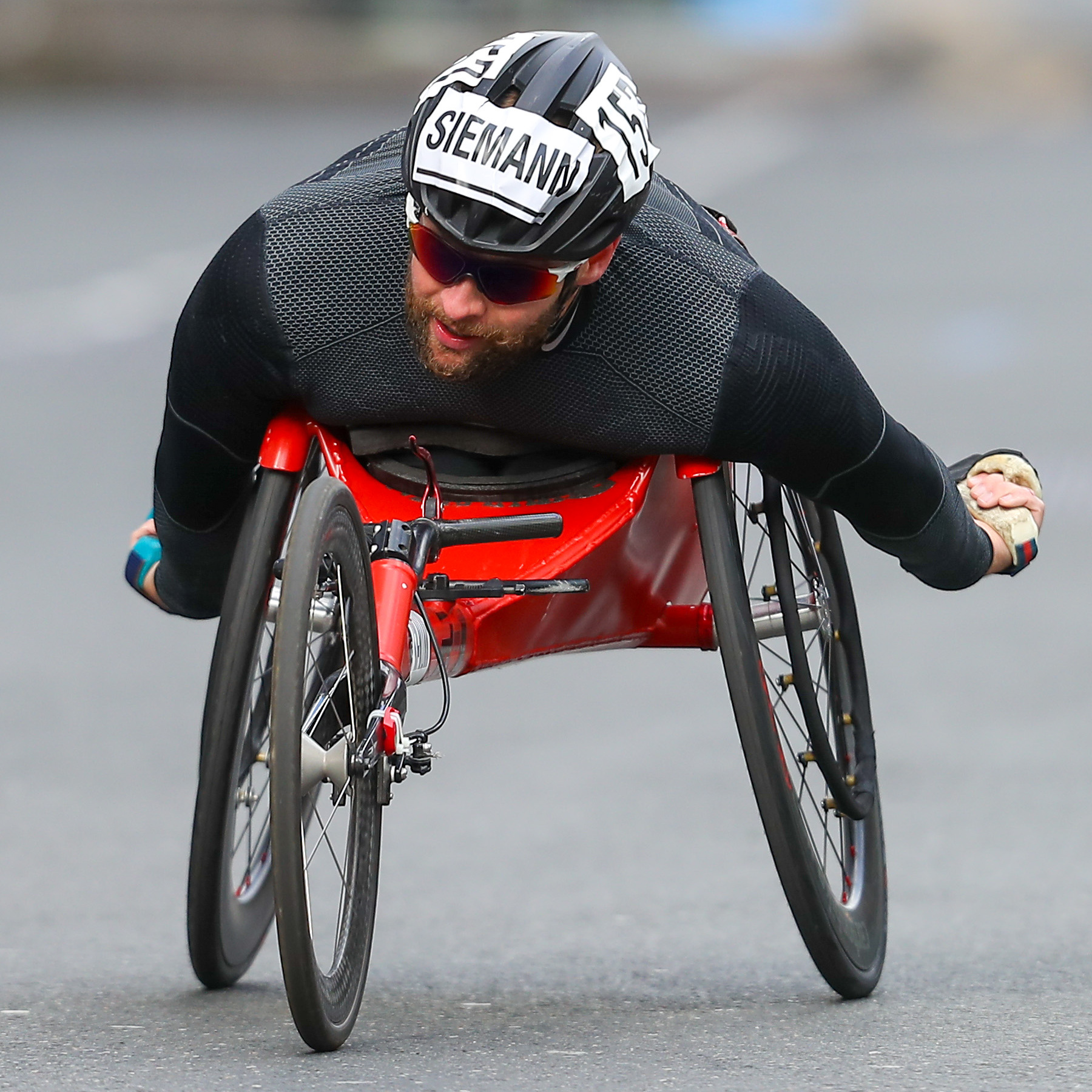
- Siemann in 2024

Personal information
- Born: October 7, 1989 (age 36) Brooklyn, New York, U.S.
- Home town: Champaign, Illinois, U.S.
- Education: University of Illinois Urbana-Champaign

Sport
- Sport: Paralympic athletics
- Disability class: T53
- Event: Wheelchair racing
Medal record
Paralympic athletics
Representing the United States
Paralympic Games
Bronze medal – third place	2024 Paris	400 m T53
Bronze medal – third place	2024 Paris	800 m T53
World Championships
Bronze medal – third place	2023 Paris	400 m T53
Bronze medal – third place	2023 Paris	800 m T53

Brian Siemann (born October 7, 1989) is an American T53 wheelchair racer.

== Early life and education ==
Siemann was born in Brooklyn, New York, and raised in Millstone, New Jersey. He attended Notre Dame High School in Lawrenceville, New Jersey. He then attended the University of Illinois Urbana-Champaign and majored in special education. He currently serves as a learning disabilities and ADHD specialist at his alma mater.

== Career ==
Siemann made his international debut for the United States at the 2011 IPC Athletics World Championships.

He represented the United States at the 2012 Summer Paralympics. He again represented the United States at the 2016 Summer Paralympics, and finished in fourth place in the 800 metres T53 event, with a time of 1:41.11, two-one hundredths of a second behind bronze medalist Brent Lakatos.

In November 2016, Siemann competed in the 2016 New York City Marathon, along with his siblings. They became the first quadruplets to compete together in the New York City Marathon.

He represented the United States at the 2017 World Para Athletics Championships in the 100 metres T53 event. He again represented the United States at the 2019 World Para Athletics Championships and finished in fourth place in the 800 metres T53 event with a time of 1:41.63.

On June 24, 2021, he was named to Team USA's roster for the 2020 Summer Paralympics. He competed in the 100 metres, 400 metres, 800 metres, 1500 metres, 5000 metres and men's marathon.

Siemann represented the United States at the 2023 World Para Athletics Championships and won bronze medals in the 400 metres T53 and 800 metres T53 events. He also participated in the 100 metres T53 event, and finished in fourth place with a time of 15.05.

In July 2024, during the U.S. Paralympic team trials, he qualified to represent the United States at the 2024 Summer Paralympics, winning bronze in the men's T53 400m.

== Personal life ==
Siemann was born to John and Teresa Siemann. He has an older brother, John, and is a quadruplet with three sisters Amanda, Maria, and Jessica. The quadruplets were born two months premature. At six days old, a doctor left Siemann's umbilical catheter open, which caused him to lose a third of the blood, resulting in spinal shock and paralyzed him from the waist down. Siemann is Catholic.
