= Nicolas Brignone =

French Paralympic athlete

Personal information
- Nationality: French
- Born: 14 May 1989 (age 37) Nouméa, New Caledonia

Sport
- Sport: Para athletics
- Disability class: T53
- Event: Sprint
- Club: Handi Club Caledonien
- Coached by: Jean-Baptiste Souche (national); Olivier Deniaud, club
Medal record
Men's para athletics
Representing France
IPC World Championships
Bronze medal – third place	2015 Doha	4x400 m relay T53-54
IPC European Championships
Silver medal – second place	2014 Swansea	400 m - T53
Bronze medal – third place	2014 Swansea	100 m - T53

Nicolas Brignone (born 14 May 1989) is a para-sport athlete from France competing mainly in category T53 sprint events. In 2015 he won the bronze medal at the IPC Athletics World Championships in Doha as part of the men's 400 m relay team.

== Personal history ==
Brignone was born in Nouméa, New Caledonia in 1989 to Vincent Brignone. Brignone was involved in a motorbike accident which left him with permanent spinal injuries.

== Professional career ==
Brignone took up para-athletics in 2011 and made his senior international debut in 2013 when he was selected for the French national team at the IPC Athletics World Championships in Lyon. The following year he won his first major international medals at the 2014 IPC Athletics European Championships in Swansea. There he won a silver in the men's 400 m and a bronze in the 100 m sprint.

In 2015 he took part in his second World Championships, travelling with the French team to Doha where he took part in five events. He made the finals of two, the 200 m T53 and the 4x400 m relay T53-54. He finished last in the 200 m sprint, but in the relay, along with teammates Alex Adelaide, Pierre Fairbank and Julien Casoli, the French team finished third to secure the bronze medal.
