= Daniel Romanchuk =

American Paralympic athlete (born 1998)

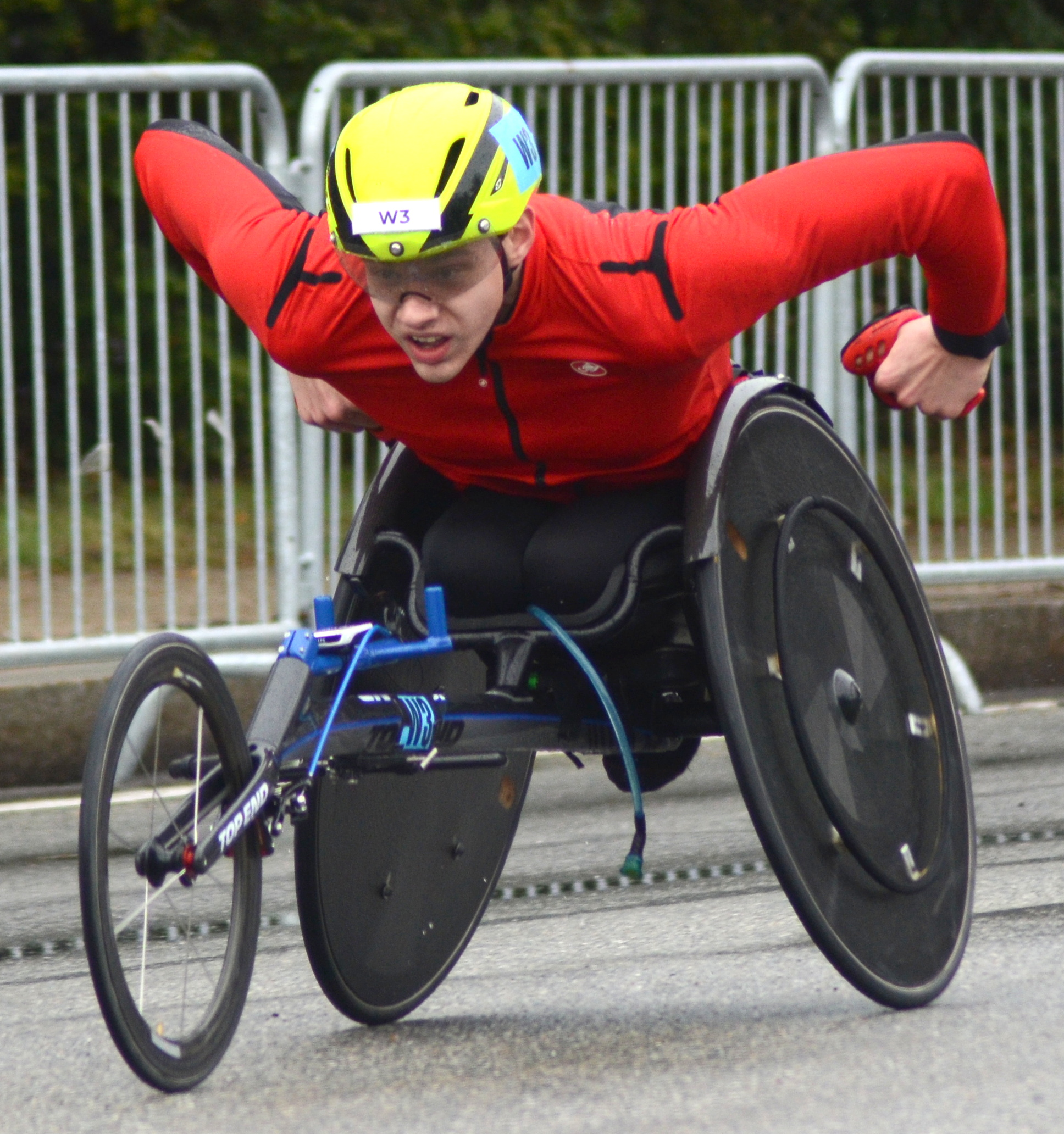
- Near the half-way mark of Romanchuk's 2019 Boston Marathon victory

Personal information
- Born: August 3, 1998 (age 28) Mount Airy, Maryland, U.S.
- Years active: 2012–present
- Height: 5 ft 8 in (173 cm)

Sport
- Disability: Spina bifida
- Coached by: Adam Bleakney

Achievements and titles
- Paralympic finals: 2016
Medal record
Paralympic athletics
Representing United States
Paralympic Games
Gold medal – first place	2020 Tokyo	400 m T54
Gold medal – first place	2024 Paris	5000 m T54
Bronze medal – third place	2020 Tokyo	Marathon T54
Bronze medal – third place	2024 Paris	400 m T54
World Championships
Gold medal – first place	2019 Dubai	800m T54
Parapan American Games
Gold medal – first place	2015 Toronto	5000m T54

Daniel Romanchuk (born August 3, 1998) is an American Paralympic athlete who competes primarily in wheelchair racing events. He won the Chicago Marathon on October 7, 2018. Less than a month later, he made history as the first American to win the men's wheelchair race at the New York City Marathon, becoming the youngest winner in the event's history. He subsequently won the New York City Marathon race again in 2019 and 2024.

Romanchuk followed up these wins with a win at the Boston Marathon on April 15, 2019. He became the first American man to win Boston's wheelchair division since 1993. With his victory at the London Marathon in April 2019, Romanchuk also won the World Para Athletics Marathon Championships title.

== Early life ==
Romanchuk was born in Mount Airy, Maryland with spina bifida, a birth defect in which there is incomplete closing of the backbone and membranes around the spinal cord. When he was 2, his parents enrolled him in an adaptive sports program linked to the Kennedy Krieger Institute in nearby Baltimore. He participated in his first track meet at age 6, but also took part in other sports, including archery, sled hockey, and softball. In track events, he set age-group records and took part in national competitions at an early age. He is of Ukrainian descent.

== Paralympics ==
In the winter of 2014, Romanchuk's mother Kim encouraged him to focus more on track in an effort to make the 2016 Paralympic team. He made the team at age 18, and competed in every track event in Rio, from the 100m to the 5000m.

In 2021, he won the gold medal in the men's 400 metres T54 event at the 2020 Summer Paralympics held in Tokyo, Japan. He also won the bronze medal in the men's marathon T54 event.

== Marathon racing ==
Romanchuk entered and finished the Baltimore Marathon, his first, at the age of 14. In April 2018, he placed 3rd in the London Marathon.

In October 2018, Romanchuk won the Chicago Marathon with a time of 1:31:34; he beat defending champion Marcel Hug by one second. Less than a month later, he became the first American winner and youngest winner in the history of the New York Marathon's wheelchair event, again defeating Hug (who had won in 2016 and 2017), and again by just one second.

In 2019, Romanchuk won the Boston Marathon in 1:21:36. He became the youngest ever winner of that race, as well as the first American to win Boston since 1993. In April 2019, he won the London Marathon with a time of 1:33:38. In 2019 he also won the Chicago Marathon and he qualified to represent the United States at the 2020 Summer Paralympics held in Tokyo, Japan. He won the bronze medal in the men's marathon T54 event.

In October 2022, Romanchuk placed second in the 2022 London Marathon, with a time of 1:24:40, two seconds behind Hug.

In November 2024, Romanchuk secured his third victory in the men’s wheelchair division of the New York City Marathon, finishing 5 seconds ahead of David Weir and completing the race in a time of 1:36:31. He had previously won the race in 2018 and 2019.
