= Putharet Khongrak =

Thai Paralympic athlete

Personal information
- Native name: ภูธเรศ คงรักษ์
- Born: 9 October 1994 (age 31)

Sport
- Disability class: T54

Achievements and titles
- Paralympic finals: 2020
Medal record
Men's para athletics
Representing Thailand
Paralympic Games
| Bronze medal – third place | 2020 Tokyo | 1500 m T54 |
| Bronze medal – third place | 2020 Tokyo | 5000 m T54 |
World Championships
| Bronze medal – third place | 2025 New Delhi | 5000 m T54 |
Asian Para Games
| Silver medal – second place | 2018 Jakarta | 1500m T54 |
| Silver medal – second place | 2022 Hangzhou | 1500 m T54 |
| Silver medal – second place | 2022 Hangzhou | 5000 m T54 |
| Bronze medal – third place | 2018 Jakarta | 400m T54 |
| Bronze medal – third place | 2018 Jakarta | 800m T54 |

Putharet Khongrak (Thai: ภูธเรศ คงรักษ์; born 9 October 1994) is a Paralympian athlete from Thailand competing mainly in category T54 sprint events.

== Career ==
He represented Thailand at the 2020 Summer Paralympics and won two bronze medals in the 1500 metres and 5000 metres T54 events.
