= Vitalii Gritsenko =

Russian Paralympic athlete

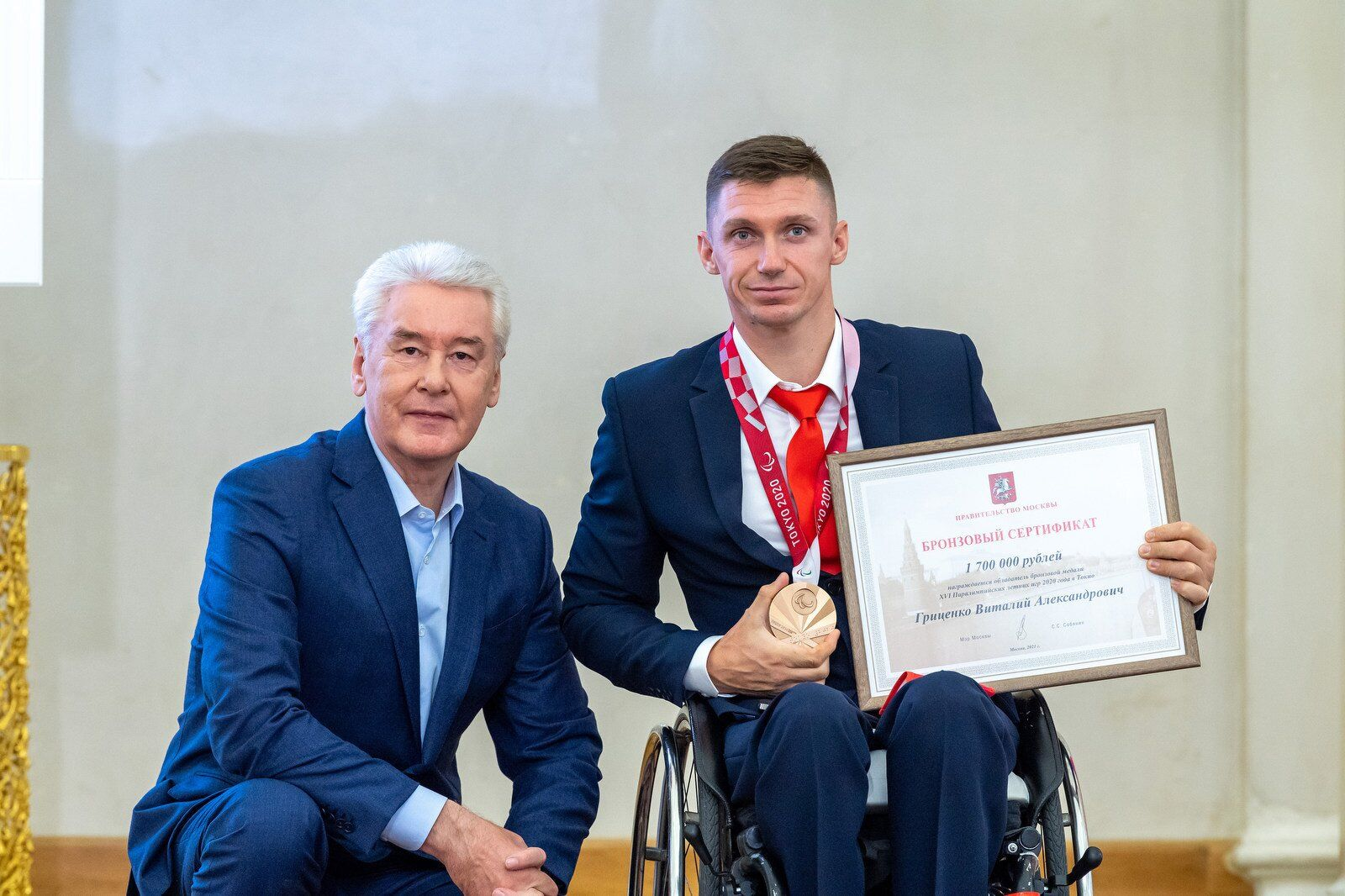

Personal information
- Nationality: Russian
- Born: 16 December 1985 (age 40)

Sport
- Sport: Wheelchair racing
- Disability class: T53
- Club: Vorobyovy Gory
- Coached by: Sergey Shilov; Alexei Vasyatkin
Medal record
Men's para-athletics
Representing RPC
Paralympic Games
Bronze medal – third place	2020 Tokyo	400 m T53
Representing Neutral Paralympic Athletes
World Championships
Bronze medal – third place	2025 New Delhi	400 m T53
Bronze medal – third place	2025 New Delhi	800 m T53
Representing Russia
European Championships
Gold medal – first place	2016 Grosseto	400 m T53
Gold medal – first place	2016 Grosseto	800 m T53
Silver medal – second place	2016 Grosseto	100 m T53
Silver medal – second place	2016 Grosseto	200 m T53
Silver medal – second place	2021 Bydgoszcz	400 m T53
Silver medal – second place	2021 Bydgoszcz	800 m T53
Bronze medal – third place	2021 Bydgoszcz	100 m T53

Vitalii Gritsenko (born 16 December 1985) is a Russian wheelchair racer in the T53 classification. He represented Russian Paralympic Committee athletes at the 2020 Summer Paralympics.

== Career ==
Gritsenko represented Russian Paralympic Committee athletes at the 2020 Summer Paralympics in the 400 m T53 event and won a bronze medal.
