= Pichet Krungget =

Thai Paralympic athlete (born 1975)

Personal information
- Born: 16 March 1975 (age 51)

Sport
- Sport: Track and field
- Disability class: T53
Medal record
Men's para-athletics
Representing Thailand
Paralympic Games
Gold medal – first place	2004 Athens	4 × 100 m T53/54
Gold medal – first place	2004 Athens	4 × 400 m T53/54
Silver medal – second place	2008 Beijing	4 × 100 m T53/54
Silver medal – second place	2008 Beijing	4 × 400 m T53/54
Bronze medal – third place	2004 Athens	200 metres T53
Asian Para Games
Silver medal – second place	2018 Jakarta	200 m T53
Silver medal – second place	2018 Jakarta	400 m T53
Bronze medal – third place	2022 Hangzhou	100 m T53
ASEAN Para Games
Gold medal – first place	2017 Kuala Lumpur	200 m T52/53
Silver medal – second place	2017 Kuala Lumpur	100 m T52/53

Pichet Krungget (RTGS: Phichet Krungket; born 16 March 1975) is a Paralympian athlete from Thailand competing mainly in category T53 sprint events.

== Career ==
Has won five Paralympic medals over 2 games. His first was a bronze in the T53 200m in 2004 Summer Paralympics where he also helped the Thai team to two gold medals in the 4 × 100 m and 4 × 400 m as well as competing in the individual 100m and 400m races. Four years later in Beijing he competed in the individual 100m, 200m, 400m and 800m and with his teammates won silver medals in both the relays, finishing behind the Chinese in both.
