= Brent Lakatos =

Canadian wheelchair racer

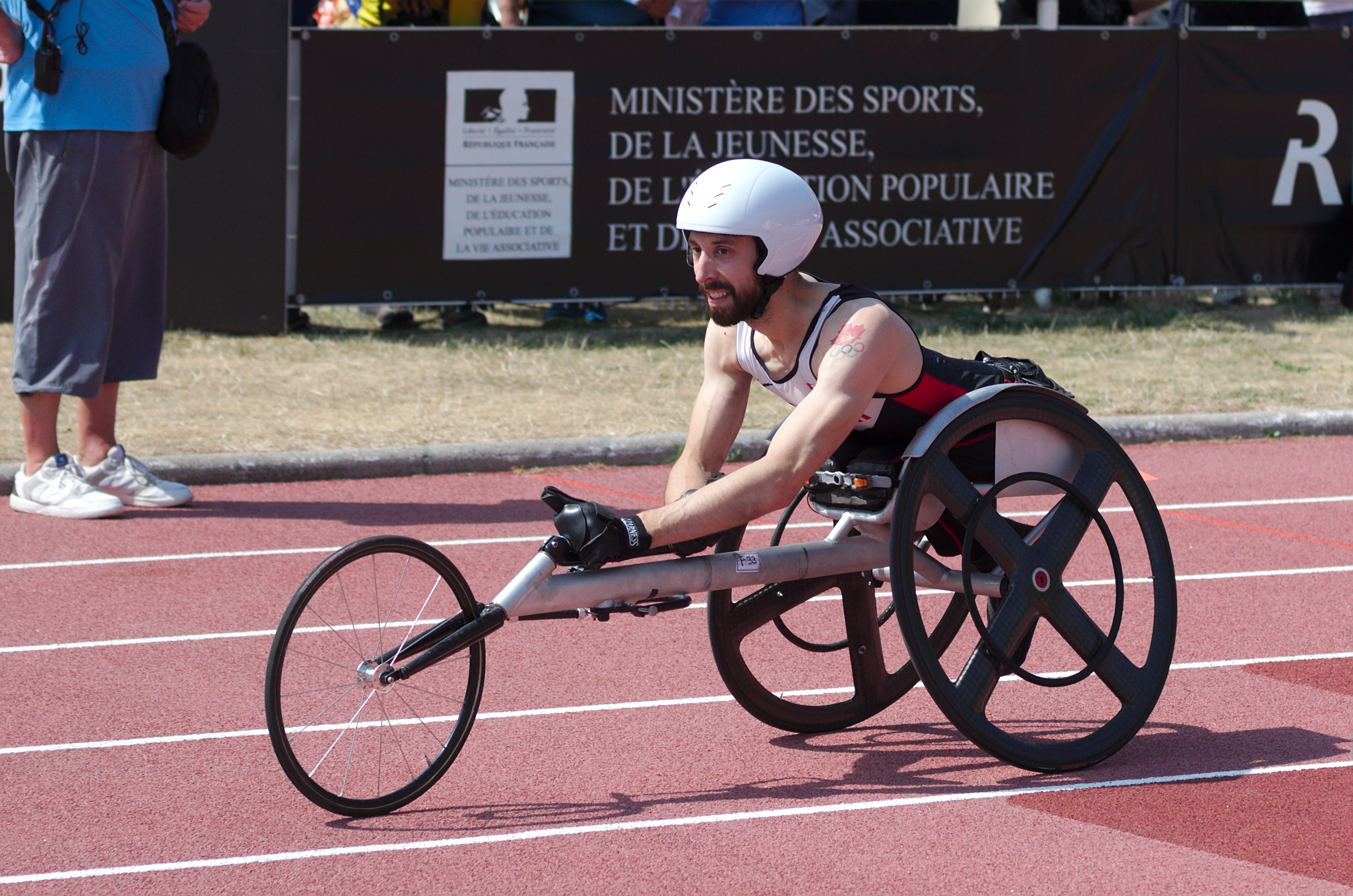
- Lakatos at the 2013 World Championships

Personal information
- Born: June 1, 1980 (age 46) Dorval, Quebec, Canada

Sport
- Country: Canada
- Sport: Para athletics
- Disability class: T53
- Event: Wheelchair racing
- Club: Red Velvet Racing Team
- Coached by: Arno Mul
Medal record
Men's para athletics
Representing Canada
Event	1st	2nd	3rd
Paralympic Games	2	9	2
World Championships	11	5	2
Parapan American Games	3	0	0
Paralympic Games
Gold medal – first place	2016 Rio de Janeiro	100 m T53
Gold medal – first place	2024 Paris	800 m T53
Silver medal – second place	2012 London	200 m T53
Silver medal – second place	2012 London	400 m T53
Silver medal – second place	2012 London	800 m T53
Silver medal – second place	2016 Rio de Janeiro	800 m T53
Silver medal – second place	2020 Tokyo	100 m T53
Silver medal – second place	2020 Tokyo	400 m T53
Silver medal – second place	2020 Tokyo	800 m T53
Silver medal – second place	2020 Tokyo	5000 m T53-T54
Silver medal – second place	2024 Paris	400 m T53
Bronze medal – third place	2016 Rio de Janeiro	800 m T53
Bronze medal – third place	2016 Rio de Janeiro	4 x 400 m T53–54
World Championships
Gold medal – first place	2013 Lyon	100 m T53
Gold medal – first place	2013 Lyon	200 m T53
Gold medal – first place	2013 Lyon	400 m T53
Gold medal – first place	2013 Lyon	4x400 m T53/54
Gold medal – first place	2015 Doha	100 m T53
Gold medal – first place	2015 Doha	200 m T53
Gold medal – first place	2015 Doha	800 m T53
Gold medal – first place	2017 London	100 m T53
Gold medal – first place	2017 London	200 m T53
Gold medal – first place	2017 London	400 m T53
Gold medal – first place	2017 London	800 m T53
Gold medal – first place	2023 Paris	800 m T53
Silver medal – second place	2011 Christchurch	200 m T53
Silver medal – second place	2013 Lyon	800 m T53
Silver medal – second place	2015 Doha	400 m T53
Silver medal – second place	2023 Paris	400 m T53
Silver medal – second place	2023 Paris	1500 m T54
Bronze medal – third place	2006 Assen	100 m T53
Bronze medal – third place	2011 Christchurch	100 m T53
Parapan American Games
Gold medal – first place	2015 Toronto	100 m T53
Gold medal – first place	2015 Toronto	800 m T53
Gold medal – first place	2015 Toronto	400 m T53

Brent Lakatos (born June 1, 1980) is a Canadian wheelchair racer in the T53 classification. Lakatos has represented Canada at six Summer Paralympics, and at the 2012 Games he won three silver medals in the sprint and mid-distance events. In 2013 Lakatos reached the pinnacle of his sport when he collected four gold medals at the IPC Athletics World Championships and became world champion at his classification in the 100m, 200m and 400m events.

== Personal history ==
Lakatos came from a sporting family and was swimming by the age of four. When he was six years-old a freak ice-skating accident resulted in the formation of a blood clot on his spine that left his legs paralyzed.

Lakatos is married to Great Britain Paralympic sprinter and long jumper, Stefanie Reid and as of 2012 they live together in Britain.

== Athletics career ==
Although Lakatos had taken part in racing events during the summer months since 1996, he did not initially take to athletics and was far more interested in wheelchair basketball, playing for the University of Texas at Arlington. Eight months before the 2004 Summer Paralympics in Athens, Lakatos decided to switch sports permanently to wheelchair racing. At that time Lakatos was competing as a T54 athlete having not yet received an International IPC Classification. In 2004 he finally qualified and was selected for the 2004 Summer Paralympics, this was quite an accomplishment for him in the T54 class, a class he was incorrectly placed in. He raced in the 100m, 200m, 4 × 100 m relay and 4 × 400 m relay, though he failed to qualify for the finals in the solo events and in the relays Canada came fourth in the finals of the 4 × 100 m and were disqualified in the 4 × 400 m.

Lakatos' career changed when receiving his first International IPC Classification at the 2004 Paralympics, he was reclassified as a T53 racer. Previously he had only been classified in Canada. He now ranked in the top 10 in the T53 class.

Lakatos again qualified for the Canadian team in the 2008 Summer Paralympics in Beijing. He was entered for the 100m, 200m and 400m T53 events, and whereas in 2004 he failed to qualify for the finals, he now qualified for all three finals. Despite his best efforts, Lakatos could only finish between 5th and 6th in all three final races. Lakatos bettered these results when he raced in the 2011 IPC Athletics World Championships, finishing third in the 100m and second in the 200m finals.

By 2012 Lakatos was a major challenger for gold medals in his T53 events. In the 2012 Summer Paralympics in London he took three silver medals; in the 200m, 400m and 800m. In the 200m and 400m finals he was beaten by China's Li Huzhao, while in the 800m he was just 11 hundredths of a second behind Richard Colman of Australia. The next year Lakatos stamped his mark on the international stage when he won five medals, four of them gold at the 2013 IPC Athletics World Championships, becoming world champion in the 100, 200 and 400m. Then the day after the World Championships he competed in the Sainsbury Anniversary Games in London, setting the World Record in the 100m with a time 14.34s.

Lakatos won his first Paralympic Games gold medal at the 2016 Rio Paralympic Games by winning the 100m T53. Lakatos also took home a silver medal in the 400m, and two bronze medals in the 800m and 4x400m relay.

In 2020, Lakatos won the 400 metres wheelchair race at the 2020 British Athletics Championships. Later in the year, he won the 2020 London Marathon in a time of 1:36:04.

In 2021, Lakatos took part in the 2020 Tokyo Paralympic Games where he ranked second four times, earning silver medals in the 100m T53, the 400m T53, the 800m T53 and the 5000m T54.

In 2024, Lakatos took part in the 2024 Paris Paralympic Games where he ranked first earning a gold medal in the 800m T53 and a silver medal in the T53 400m.
