= Pierre Fairbank =

French Paralympic athlete

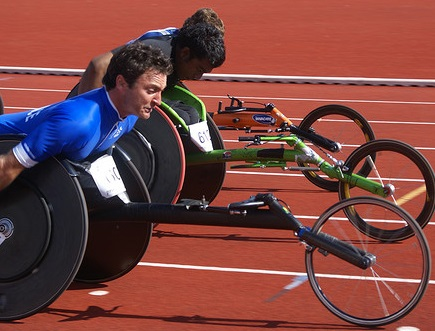
- Fairbank (front) at the 2006 World Championships

Personal information
- Nationality: French
- Born: 27 July 1971 (age 54) Hienghène, New Caledonia, France

Sport
- Sport: Paralympic athletics
- Disability class: T53
- Event(s): Sprint; Middle distance
Medal record
Men's para-athletics
Representing France
Paralympic Games
Gold medal – first place	2000 Sydney	200 m T53
Silver medal – second place	2000 Sydney	400 m T53
Silver medal – second place	2004 Athens	4x400 m T53/54
Bronze medal – third place	2000 Sydney	800 m T53
Bronze medal – third place	2004 Athens	4x100 m T53/54
Bronze medal – third place	2008 Beijing	4x400 m T53/54
Bronze medal – third place	2016 Rio	400 m T53
World Championships
Gold medal – first place	2002 Lille	400 m T53
Gold medal – first place	2002 Lille	800 m T53
Gold medal – first place	2024 Kobe	400 m T53
Gold medal – first place	2024 Kobe	800 m T53
Silver medal – second place	2002 Lille	200 m T53
Silver medal – second place	2002 Lille	4x100 m T53-54
Bronze medal – third place	2013 Lyon	200 m T53
Bronze medal – third place	2013 Lyon	800 m T53
Bronze medal – third place	2015 Doha	100 m T53
Bronze medal – third place	2015 Doha	800 m T53
Bronze medal – third place	2015 Doha	4x400 m T53-54
World Para Athletics European ChampionshipsEuropean Championships
Gold medal – first place	2014 Swansea	800 m T53
Gold medal – first place	2014 Swansea	200 m T53
Silver medal – second place	2014 Swansea	100 m T53

Pierre Fairbank (born 27 July 1971) is a Paralympian athlete from France and New Caledonia competing mainly in category T53 sprint events.

== Career ==
Fairbank first competed in the Paralympics in 2000 in Sydney where he won a gold in the T53 200m, a silver in the T53 400m and a bronze in the T53 800m, he also competed in the T54 Marathon. Four years later in Athens he again competed in the 200m, 400m and 800m but was unable to win a medal in these, however he did help the French team to a silver in the T53-54 4 × 400 m and a bronze in the T53-54 4 × 100 m. In 2008 in Beijing he again missed out in the individual events but again helped the French team to a bronze in the T53-54 4 × 400 m. In London 2012, he won no medals, though he did qualify for the final of the 800m, finishing 7th.
