= 2019 World Para Athletics Championships – Men's 400 metres =

The men's 400 metres at the 2019 World Para Athletics Championships was held in Dubai from 7–15 November.

== Medalists ==
Event	Gold		Silver		Bronze	
T11 details	Timothée Adolphe; Guide: Jeffrey Lami; France	50.91 PB	Daniel Mendes da Silva; Guide: Wendel de Souza Silva; Brazil	50.96	Felipe de Souza Gomes; Guide: Jonas Silva; Brazil	51.54 SB
T12 details	Abdeslam Hili; Morocco	47.79 WR	Mahdi Afri; Morocco	47.87 PB	Oğuz Akbulut; Turkey	48.99 PB
T13 details	Johannes Nambala; Namibia	48.73 SB	Egor Sharov; Russia	49.07 SB	Aleksandr Shirin; Russia	50.31
T20 details	Daniel Tavares Martins; Brazil	47.62 CR	Anderson Alexander Colorado Mina; Ecuador	48.18	Luis Felipe Rodríguez Bolívar; Venezuela	48.51
T34 details	Walid Ktila; Tunisia	50.54	Mohamed Alhammadi; United Arab Emirates	51.11	Wang Yang; China	52.84 PB
T36 details	James Turner; Australia	51.71 WR	Evgenii Shvetsov; Russia	53.18 AR	William Stedman; New Zealand	54.28 SB
T37 details	Andrey Vdovin; Russia	50.45 WR	Chermen Kobesov; Russia	50.97 PB	Charl du Toit; South Africa	51.53 SB
T38 details	Dixon De Jesus Hooker Velasquez; Colombia	51.10 AR	José Rodolfo Chessani García; Mexico	51.91 PB	Mohamed Farhat Chida; Tunisia	52.28 SB
T44 details	Nour Alsana; Saudi Arabia	53.22 SB	Karim Ramadan; Egypt	53.39 AR	Vinay Kumar Lal; India	55.49
T47 details	Petrucio Ferrreira dos Santos; Brazil	47.87 CR	Thomaz Ruan de Moraes; Brazil	48.27 PB	Ayoub Sadni; Morocco	48.96 AR
T52 details	Tomoki Sato; Japan	59.25	Tomoya Ito; Japan	1:00.06 SB	Raymond Martin; United States	1:00.35
T53 details	Pongsakorn Paeyo; Thailand	48.08 SB	Brent Lakatos; Canada	48.33	Yang Shaoqiao; China	49.52
T54 details	Yassine Gharbi; Tunisia	46.06	Zhang Yong; China	47.26	Richard Chiassaro; United Kingdom	47.58
T62 details	Johannes Floors; Germany	45.78 WR	Olivier Hendriks; Netherlands	50.79 PB	Nick Rogers; United States	52.13

== T11 ==
=== Records ===
World record	Daniel Mendes da Silva (BRA)	49.82	Guadalajara, Mexico	18 November 2011
Championship record	Daniel Mendes da Silva (BRA)	50.38	Lyon, France	27 July 2013

=== Schedule ===
Date	Time	Round
10 November	18:10	Round 1
11 November	19:02	Final

=== Round 1 ===
First 1 of each heat (Q) and the next 1 fastest (q) advance to the final.

Rank	Heat	Lane	Sport Class	Name	Nationality	Time	Notes
1	2	3	T11	Timothée Adolphe; Guide: Jeffrey Lami	France	50.93	Q, PB
2	1	5	T11	Gerard Descarrega Puigdevall; Guide: Guillermo Rojo Gil	Spain	51.13	Q
3	2	5	T11	Daniel Mendes da Silva; Guide: Wendel de Souza Silva	Brazil	51.17	q
4	3	3	T11	Felipe de Souza Gomes; Guide: Jonas Silva	Brazil	52.37	Q
5	1	3	T11	Ananias Shikongo; Guide: Sem Shimanda	Namibia	52.47	SB
6	3	7	T11	Gauthier Makunda; Guide: Emeric Chattey	France	53.43	SB
7	1	7	T11	Enderson German Santos Vallesteros; Guide: Eubrig Jose Maza Caraballo	Venezuela	53.85	
8	2	7	T11	Fan Zetan; Guide: Han Hongyu	China	54.30	
9	1	1	T11	Suphachai Songphinit; Guide: Chinuwat Chulong	Thailand	55.89	
10	3	1	T11	Jose Chamoleia; Guide: Nicolau Ernesto Palanca	Angola	56.92	
	2	1	T11	Mohammed Ayade; Guide: Mohmed Al-Hamzae	DQ	R 7.10	
	3	5	T11	Di Dongdong; Guide: Dong Haiqiang	DQ	R 19.4	

=== Final ===
The final was started on 11 November at 19:02.

Rank	Lane	Sport Class	Name	Nationality	Time	Notes
1st place, gold medalist(s)	3	T11	Timothée Adolphe; Guide: Jeffrey Lami	France	50.91	PB
2nd place, silver medalist(s)	1	T11	Daniel Mendes da Silva; Guide: Wendel de Souza Silva	Brazil	50.96	
3rd place, bronze medalist(s)	7	T11	Felipe de Souza Gomes; Guide: Jonas Silva	Brazil	51.54	SB
	5	T11	Gerard Descarrega Puigdevall; Guide: Guillermo Rojo Gil	Spain	DQ	R 7.9

== T12 ==
=== Records ===
World record	Mahmoud Khaldi (TUN)	48.52	London, United Kingdom	6 September 2012
Championship record	Mahdi Afri (MAR)	48.60	London, United Kingdom	18 July 2017

=== Schedule ===
Date	Time	Round
7 November	10:03	Round 1
9 November	9:17	Semifinals
9 November	18:42	Final

=== Round 1 ===
First 1 of each heat (Q) and the next 7 fastest (q) advance to the semifinals

Rank	Heat	Lane	Sport Class	Name	Nationality	Time	Notes
1	3	5	T12	Oğuz Akbulut	Turkey	50.25	Q
2	1	5	T12	Mahdi Afri	Morocco	50.31	Q
3	4	3	T12	Nabil Rahhali Omari	Morocco	50.37	Q
4	5	5	T12	Luís Gonçalves	Portugal	50.45	Q, SB
5	2	5	T12	Abdeslam Hili	Morocco	50.66	Q
6	2	3	T12	Nguyen Khanh Minh Pham	Vietnam	50.75	q, PB
7	3	3	T12	Jose Luis Fernandez Taular	Spain	50.76	q
8	5	3	T12	Hakan Cira	Turkey	50.81	q, SB
9	1	3	T12	Jaco Smit	South Africa	51.70	q
10	4	5	T12	Joan Munar Martinez; Guide: Sidney Mark Ujakpor Sanchez	Spain	51.79	q
11	5	1	T12	Edwin Masuge	Botswana	52.30	q, PB
12	5	7	T12	Eko Saputra	Indonesia	53.27	q
13	1	7	T12	Anton Kuliatin	Russia	54.64	
14	3	1	T12	Marungu Christoph	Namibia	55.13	
15	2	7	T12	Artem Loginov	Russia	55.69	
	4	7	T12	Henry Nzungi Muendo	Kenya	DQ	R 18.5
	3	7	T12	Abel Ciorap	Romania	DQ	R 18.5

=== Semifinals ===
First 1 in each heat (Q) and the next 1 fastest (q) advance to the final.

Rank	Heat	Lane	Sport Class	Name	Nationality	Time	Notes
1	1	5	T12	Mahdi Afri	Morocco	48.94	Q, SB
2	3	5	T12	Abdeslam Hili	Morocco	48.96	Q, PB
3	3	3	T12	Oğuz Akbulut	Turkey	49.01	q, PB
4	1	3	T12	Nguyen Khanh Minh Pham	Vietnam	49.92	PB
5	2	5	T12	Nabil Rahhali Omari	Morocco	50.07	Q
6	3	7	T12	Jose Luis Fernandez Taular	Spain	50.12	PB
7	2	3	T12	Luís Gonçalves	Portugal	50.61	
8	1	7	T12	Hakan Cira	Turkey	50.67	SB
9	2	7	T12	Jaco Smit	South Africa	51.05	
10	2	1	T12	Joan Munar Martinez; Guide: Sidney Mark Ujakpor Sanchez	Spain	51.99	
11	1	1	T12	Edwin Masuge	Botswana	53.29	
12	3	1	T12	Eko Saputra	Indonesia	53.66	

=== Final ===
The final was started on 9 November at 18:42.

Rank	Lane	Sport Class	Name	Nationality	Time	Notes
1st place, gold medalist(s)	5	T12	Abdeslam Hili	Morocco	47.79	WR
2nd place, silver medalist(s)	3	T12	Mahdi Afri	Morocco	47.87	PB
3rd place, bronze medalist(s)	1	T12	Oğuz Akbulut	Turkey	48.99	PB
4	7	T12	Nabil Rahhali Omari	Morocco	49.78	

== T13 ==
=== Records ===
World record	Mohamed Amguoun (MAR)	46.92	London, United Kingdom	21 July 2017
Championship record	Mohamed Amguoun (MAR)	46.92	London, United Kingdom	21 July 2017

=== Schedule ===
Date	Time	Round
8 November	19:03	Round 1
9 November	19:19	Final

=== Round 1 ===
First 3 in each heat (Q) and the next 2 fastest (q) advance to the final.

Rank	Heat	Lane	Sport Class	Name	Nationality	Time	Notes
1	2	6	T13	Johannes Nambala	Namibia	49.29	Q, SB
2	1	7	T13	Egor Sharov	Russia	49.76	Q
3	1	5	T13	Aleksandr Shirin	Russia	50.34	Q
4	2	5	T13	Vahid Alinajimi	Iran	50.49	Q
5	1	6	T13	Jorge Benjamin Gonzalez Sauceda	Mexico	50.79	Q, SB
6	2	7	T13	Jakub Nicpon	Poland	51.25	Q
7	1	4	T13	Markeith Price	United States	51.27	q, SB
8	1	9	T13	Doniyorjon Akhmedov	Uzbekistan	51.60	q, PB
9	2	9	T13	Bose Mokgwathi	Botswana	52.15	
10	2	4	T13	Andrei Kuzmin	Russia	53.72	
11	2	8	T13	Songwut Lamson	Thailand	53.77	SB
12	1	8	T13	Eino Twegathetwa Mushila	Namibia	53.78	SB
13	1	3	T13	Stanley Katlego Matutu	Botswana	56.72	PB
	2	3	T13	Bolae Lekoetje	Lesotho	DNS	

=== Final ===
The final was started on 9 November at 19:19.

Rank	Lane	Sport Class	Name	Nationality	Time	Notes
1st place, gold medalist(s)	6	T13	Johannes Nambala	Namibia	48.73	SB
2nd place, silver medalist(s)	7	T13	Egor Sharov	Russia	49.07	SB
3rd place, bronze medalist(s)	4	T13	Aleksandr Shirin	Russia	50.31	
4	8	T13	Jorge Benjamin Gonzalez Sauceda	Mexico	50.80	
5	3	T13	Markeith Price	United States	50.99	SB
6	2	T13	Doniyorjon Akhmedov	Uzbekistan	51.09	PB
7	9	T13	Jakub Nicpon	Poland	51.44	
8	5	T13	Vahid Alinajimi	Iran	1:02.34	

== T20 ==
=== Records ===
World record	Daniel Tavares Martins (BRA)	46.86	São Paulo, Brazil	27 April 2019
Championship record	Daniel Tavares Martins (BRA)	47.66	London, United Kingdom	17 July 2017

=== Schedule ===
Date	Time	Round
9 November	18:09	Round 1
10 November	19:50	Final

=== Round 1 ===
First 2 in each heat (Q) and the next 2 fastest (q) advance to the final.

Rank	Heat	Lane	Sport Class	Name	Nationality	Time	Notes
1	3	7	T20	Damian Josue Carcelen Delgado	Ecuador	49.32	Q
2	3	6	T20	Luis Felipe Rodríguez Bolívar	Venezuela	49.40	Q
3	1	7	T20	Anderson Alexander Colorado Mina	Ecuador	49.67	Q
4	1	5	T20	Charles-Antoine Kouakou	France	49.69	Q
5	1	6	T20	Artem Muratov	Russia	49.85	q, SB
6	3	5	T20	Deliber Rodríguez Ramírez	Spain	49.90	q, SB
7	2	4	T20	Daniel Tavares Martins	Brazil	49.92	Q
8	1	4	T20	Sandro Patricio Correia Baessa	Portugal	50.00	SB
9	3	4	T20	Jhan Carlos Wisdom Lungrin	Panama	50.10	PB
10	2	7	T20	Luis Arturo Paiva Rengifo	Venezuela	50.19	Q
11	2	9	T20	Raffaele di Maggio	Italy	50.21	PB
12	2	5	T20	Nasharuddin Mohd	Malaysia	51.54	
13	3	9	T20	Carlos Freitas	Portugal	51.90	PB
14	3	8	T20	Daniel Pek	Poland	52.12	
15	1	9	T20	Fernando Enrique Batista Restituyo	Spain	52.69 (.684)	
16	2	8	T20	Dionibel Rodríguez Rodríguez	Spain	52.69 (.686)	
17	1	8	T20	Chong Kung Yuen	Hong Kong	53.33	
18	2	3	T20	Yim Ching Hei	Hong Kong	54.54	
19	2	6	T20	Nikolaos Tryfinopoulos	Greece	57.35	

=== Final ===
The final was started on 10 November at 19:50.

Rank	Lane	Sport Class	Name	Nationality	Time	Notes
1st place, gold medalist(s)	5	T20	Daniel Tavares Martins	Brazil	47.62	CR
2nd place, silver medalist(s)	7	T20	Anderson Alexander Colorado Mina	Ecuador	48.18	
3rd place, bronze medalist(s)	6	T20	Luis Felipe Rodríguez Bolívar	Venezuela	48.51	
4	4	T20	Damian Josue Carcelen Delgado	Ecuador	48.60	
5	9	T20	Charles-Antoine Kouakou	France	49.41	
6	2	T20	Artem Muratov	Russia	49.56	SB
7	3	T20	Deliber Rodríguez Ramírez	Spain	49.87	SB
8	8	T20	Luis Arturo Paiva Rengifo	Venezuela	49.94	

== T34 ==
=== Records ===
World record	Walid Ktila (TUN)	49.08	Arbon, Switzerland	27 May 2017
Championship record	Walid Ktila (TUN)	50.56	London, United Kingdom	17 July 2017

=== Schedule ===
Date	Time	Round
8 November	18:41	Round 1
9 November	19:41	Final

=== Round 1 ===
First 3 in each heat (Q) and the next 2 fastest (q) advance to the final.

Rank	Heat	Lane	Sport Class	Name	Nationality	Time	Notes
1	1	4	T34	Walid Ktila	Tunisia	49.31	Q, CR
2	2	6	T34	Mohamed Alhammadi	United Arab Emirates	51.18	Q
3	2	5	T34	Austin Smeenk	Canada	52.56	Q
4	2	9	T34	Wang Yang	China	52.89	Q, PB
5	1	5	T34	Henry Manni	Finland	52.99	Q
6	1	8	T34	Chaiwat Rattana	Thailand	53.05	Q, PB
7	2	4	T34	Isaac Towers	United Kingdom	53.54	q
8	1	6	T34	Ben Rowlings	United Kingdom	53.71	q
9	1	9	T34	Ahmed Nawad	United Arab Emirates	54.89	PB
10	2	7	T34	Bojan Mitic	Switzerland	55.38	
11	2	8	T34	Mohammed Rashid A J Al-Kubaisi	Qatar	55.43	PB
12	1	3	T34	Roberto Michel	Mauritius	57.22	PB
13	1	7	T34	Lee Leclerc	Canada	58.52	
	2	3	T34	Abdullah Alenezi	Kuwait	DQ	R 18.5

=== Final ===
The final was started on 9 November at 19:41.

Rank	Lane	Sport Class	Name	Nationality	Time	Notes
1st place, gold medalist(s)	5	T34	Walid Ktila	Tunisia	50.54	
2nd place, silver medalist(s)	7	T34	Mohamed Alhammadi	United Arab Emirates	51.11	
3rd place, bronze medalist(s)	8	T34	Wang Yang	China	52.84	PB
4	4	T34	Henry Manni	Finland	53.15	
5	6	T34	Austin Smeenk	Canada	53.39	
6	9	T34	Chaiwat Rattana	Thailand	54.15	
7	2	T34	Isaac Towers	United Kingdom	54.28	
8	3	T34	Ben Rowlings	United Kingdom	54.57	

== T36 ==
=== Records ===
World record	Evgenii Shvetsov (RUS)	51.88	London, United Kingdom	4 September 2012
Championship record	Evgenii Shvetsov (RUS)	52.88	Doha, Qatar	23 October 2015

=== Schedule ===
Date	Time	Round
13 November	18:09	Round 1
14 November	10:54	Final

=== Round 1 ===
First 3 in each heat (Q) and the next 2 fastest (q) advance to the final.

Rank	Heat	Lane	Sport Class	Name	Nationality	Time	Notes
1	1	7	T36	James Turner	Australia	55.67	Q
2	1	4	T36	Paul Blake	United Kingdom	55.85	Q, SB
3	1	5	T36	Krzysztof Ciuksza	Poland	55.94	Q, SB
4	2	6	T36	Evgenii Shvetsov	Russia	57.73	Q
5	2	7	T36	William Stedman	New Zealand	57.88	Q
6	2	4	T36	Alexis Sebastian Chavez	Argentina	58.45	Q
7	1	6	T36	Sid Ali Bouzourine	Algeria	59.02	q, AR
8	2	5	T36	Juan Moreno Marquez	Colombia	59.06	q
9	1	8	T36	Mohamad Ridzuan Mohamad Puzi	Malaysia	1:01.55	
10	2	3	T36	Taha Al Harrasi	Oman	1:01.60	
11	2	8	T36	José Manuel González	Spain	1:04.71	SB
12	1	3	T36	José Pámpano	Spain	1:07.65	
	1	9	T36	Enrique Abdiel Ornano Diaz	Panama	DQ	R 18.5

=== Final ===
The final was started on 14 November at 10:54.

Rank	Lane	Sport Class	Name	Nationality	Time	Notes
1st place, gold medalist(s)	5	T36	James Turner	Australia	51.71	WR
2nd place, silver medalist(s)	7	T36	Evgenii Shvetsov	Russia	53.18	AR
3rd place, bronze medalist(s)	4	T36	William Stedman	New Zealand	54.28	SB
4	8	T36	Krzysztof Ciuksza	Poland	55.64	SB
5	6	T36	Paul Blake	United Kingdom	55.91	
6	3	T36	Juan Moreno Marquez	Colombia	57.09	AR
7	9	T36	Alexis Sebastian Chavez	Argentina	57.70	PB
8	2	T36	Sid Ali Bouzourine	Algeria	1:01.87	

== T37 ==
=== Records ===
World record	Andrei Vdovin (RUS)	50.52	Grosseto, Italy	14 June 2016
Championship record	Andrei Vdovin (RUS)	50.99	Doha, Qatar	29 October 2015

=== Schedule ===
Date	Time	Round
9 November	10:25	Round 1
9 November	20:11	Final

=== Round 1 ===
First 3 in each heat (Q) and next 2 fastest (q) advance to the final.

Rank	Heat	Lane	Sport Class	Name	Nationality	Time	Notes
1	2	7	T37	Chermen Kobesov	Russia	51.89	Q, SB
2	1	6	T37	Andrei Vdovin	Russia	52.29	Q
3	1	4	T37	Michał Kotkowski	Poland	52.78	Q, SB
4	2	4	T37	Vitor Antonio de Jesus	Brazil	52.85	Q
5	1	7	T37	Yaroslav Okapinskyi	Ukraine	53.49	Q, PB
6	2	5	T37	Charl du Toit	South Africa	53.54	Q
7	2	9	T37	Liam Stanley	Canada	54.18	q, PB
8	1	5	T37	Zhou Peng	China	54.74	q
9	1	9	T37	Renaud Clerc	France	56.53	
10	2	8	T37	Valentin Bertrand	France	57.05	
11	1	3	T37	Jan Mostek	Czech Republic	1:00.38	PB
12	2	6	T37	Sofiane Hamdi	Algeria	1:09.05	
	1	8	T37	Ali Alnakhli	Saudi Arabia	DNF	

=== Final ===
The final was started on 9 November at 20:11.

Rank	Lane	Sport Class	Name	Nationality	Time	Notes
1st place, gold medalist(s)	7	T37	Andrei Vdovin	Russia	50.45	WR
2nd place, silver medalist(s)	4	T37	Chermen Kobesov	Russia	50.97	PB
3rd place, bronze medalist(s)	8	T37	Charl du Toit	South Africa	51.53	SB
4	6	T37	Michał Kotkowski	Poland	51.83	PB
5	5	T37	Vitor Antonio de Jesus	Brazil	52.81	
6	9	T37	Yaroslav Okapinskyi	Ukraine	53.53	
7	3	T37	Zhou Peng	China	54.83	
8	2	T37	Liam Stanley	Canada	55.46	

== T38 ==
=== Records ===
World record	Mohamed Farhat Chida (TUN)	49.33	Christchurch, New Zealand	29 January 2011
Championship record	Mohamed Farhat Chida (TUN)	49.33	Christchurch, New Zealand	29 January 2011

=== Schedule ===
Date	Time	Round
7 November	19:42	Round 1
8 November	19:19	Final

=== Round 1 ===
First 3 in each heat (Q) and next 2 fastest (q) advance to the final.

Rank	Heat	Lane	Sport Class	Name	Nationality	Time	Notes
1	2	5	T38	José Rodolfo Chessani García	Mexico	52.28	Q, PB
2	2	4	T38	Dyan Buis	South Africa	52.89	Q
3	1	8	T38	Ali Al-Rikabi	Iraq	53.13	Q, PB
4	2	7	T38	Dixon De Jesus Hooker Velasquez	Colombia	53.21	Q
5	1	6	T38	Mohamed Farhat Chida	Tunisia	53.34	Q
6	1	7	T38	Anton Feoktistov	Russia	53.42	Q
7	1	4	T38	Zachary Gingras	Canada	53.80	q
8	2	6	T38	Abbas Al-Darraji	Iraq	54.68	q
9	2	9	T38	Apisit Taprom	Thailand	55.90	
10	1	9	T38	Union Sekailwe	South Africa	55.99	
11	2	3	T38	Keegan Pitcher	New Zealand	56.74	
12	1	5	T38	Zhu Dening	China	57.45	
13	1	2	T38	Conor McIlveen	Ireland	58.86	
	1	3	T38	Lorenzo Albaladejo Martinez	Spain	DQ	R 17.8
	2	8	T38	Zhong Huanghao	China	DQ	R 17.8

=== Final ===
The final was started on 8 November at 19:19.

Rank	Lane	Sport Class	Name	Nationality	Time	Notes
1st place, gold medalist(s)	9	T38	Dixon De Jesus Hooker Velasquez	Colombia	51.10	AR
2nd place, silver medalist(s)	7	T38	José Rodolfo Chessani García	Mexico	51.91	PB
3rd place, bronze medalist(s)	4	T38	Mohamed Farhat Chida	Tunisia	52.28	SB
4	6	T38	Ali Al-Rikabi	Iraq	52.63	PB
5	8	T38	Anton Feoktistov	Russia	52.66	
6	5	T38	Dyan Buis	South Africa	52.96	
7	3	T38	Abbas Al-Darraji	Iraq	53.30	SB
8	2	T38	Zachary Gingras	Canada	54.59	

== T44 ==
=== Schedule ===
Date	Time	Round
14 November	9:50	Final

=== Final ===
The final was started on 14 November at 9:50.

Rank	Lane	Sport Class	Name	Nationality	Time	Notes
1st place, gold medalist(s)	7	T44	Nour Alsana	Saudi Arabia	53.22	SB
2nd place, silver medalist(s)	4	T44	Karim Ramadan	Egypt	53.39	AR
3rd place, bronze medalist(s)	6	T44	Vinay Kumar Lal	India	55.49	
4	5	T44	Emanuele Di Marino	Italy	57.00	SB
5	8	T44	Sandeep Kumar	India	1:01.95	
6	3	T44	Darwin Paul Vallejo	Ecuador	1:05.71	
	9	T44	Denpoom Kotcharang	Thailand	DNS	

== T47 ==
=== Records ===
World record	Heath Francis (AUS)	47.69	Beijing, China	10 September 2008
Championship record	Jaquvis Hart (USA)	48.17	Doha, Qatar	23 October 2015

=== Schedule ===
Date	Time	Round
8 November	18:17	Round 1
9 November	19:33	Final

=== Round 1 ===
First 3 in each heat (Q) and next 2 fastest (q) advance to the final.

Rank	Heat	Lane	Sport Class	Name	Nationality	Time	Notes
1	2	7	T47	Petrucio Ferrreira dos Santos	Brazil	49.09	Q, SB
2	2	5	T47	Ayoub Sadni	Morocco	49.29	Q, AR
3	2	4	T46	Kakeru Ishida	Japan	49.95	Q
4	1	5	T47	Thomaz Ruan de Moraes	Brazil	49.96	Q
5	2	6	T46	Wang Hao	China	50.36	q
6	1	4	T47	Nur Ferry Pradana	Indonesia	50.58	Q, SB
7	1	7	T46	Yohansson Nascimento	Brazil	51.35	Q
8	1	8	T47	Thomas Normandeau	Canada	51.84	q
9	1	9	T47	Andonis Aresti	Cyprus	51.89	SB
10	2	3	T46	Vincent Kiprono Mutai	Kenya	53.24	
11	1	3	T46	Manuel Ernesto Jaime	Angola	54.12	
12	2	8	T47	Alexander Pototschnig	Austria	54.74	
	1	2	T47	Elyas Alyasi	Brunei	DNF	
	1	6	T46	Ifeanyichukwu Madubuike	Nigeria	DQ	R 18.5
	2	9	T46	Tanner Wright	United States	DQ	R 18.5
	2	2	T46	Erens Sabandar	Indonesia	DQ	R 18.5

=== Final ===
The final was started on 9 November at 19:33.

Rank	Lane	Sport Class	Name	Nationality	Time	Notes
1st place, gold medalist(s)	4	T47	Petrucio Ferrreira dos Santos	Brazil	47.87	CR
2nd place, silver medalist(s)	6	T47	Thomaz Ruan de Moraes	Brazil	48.27	PB
3rd place, bronze medalist(s)	7	T47	Ayoub Sadni	Morocco	48.96	AR
4	8	T46	Yohansson Nascimento	Brazil	49.31	
5	9	T46	Kakeru Ishida	Japan	49.44	PB
6	2	T46	Wang Hao	China	50.33	
7	5	T47	Nur Ferry Pradana	Indonesia	50.82	
8	3	T47	Thomas Normandeau	Canada	52.99	

== T52 ==
=== Records ===
World record	Tomoki Sato (JPN)	55.13	Machida, Japan	1 July 2018
Championship record	Tomoki Sato (JPN)	56.78	London, United Kingdom	18 July 2017

=== Schedule ===
Date	Time	Round
8 November	20:58	Round 1
9 November	20:35	Final

=== Round 1 ===
First 3 of each heat (Q) and the next 2 fastest (q) advance to the final.

Rang	Heat	Lane	Sport Class	Name	Nationality	Time	Notes
1	2	5	T52	Tomoki Sato	Japan	59.42	Q
2	1	7	T52	Raymond Martin	United States	59.45	Q
3	1	5	T52	Tomoya Ito	Japan	1:00.54	Q
4	1	4	T52	Gianfranco Iannotta	United States	1:02.18	Q
5	2	4	T52	Isaiah Rigo	United States	1:02.37	Q
6	2	7	T52	Hirokazu Ueyonabaru	Japan	1:03.12	Q
7	1	9	T52	Peth Rungsri	Thailand	1:03.75	q
8	2	8	T52	Jeong Jongdae	South Korea	1:04.63	q
9	1	6	T52	Kęstutis Skučas	Lithuania	1:05.18	
10	1	8	T52	Salvador Hernández Mondragon	Mexico	1:05.44	
11	2	6	T52	Beat Bösch	Switzerland	1:05.83	
12	2	3	T52	Brandon Beack	South Africa	1:08.76	
13	2	2	T52	Mário Trindade	Portugal	1:09.84	
14	1	2	T52	Sam McIntosh	Australia	1:14.87	
	2	9	T52	Leonardo de Jesús Pérez Juárez	Mexico	DQ	R 18.5
	1	3	T52	Fabian Blum	Switzerland	DQ	R 18.5

=== Final ===
The final was started on 9 November at 20:35.

Rank	Lane	Sport Class	Name	Nationality	Time	Notes
1st place, gold medalist(s)	7	T52	Tomoki Sato	Japan	59.25	
2nd place, silver medalist(s)	5	T52	Tomoya Ito	Japan	1:00.06	SB
3rd place, bronze medalist(s)	4	T52	Raymond Martin	United States	1:00.35	
4	9	T52	Hirokazu Ueyonabaru	Japan	1:03.27	
5	6	T52	Isaiah Rigo	United States	1:03.59	
6	2	T52	Peth Rungsri	Thailand	1:05.13	
7	3	T52	Jeong Jongdae	South Korea	1:09.87	
	8	T52	Gianfranco Iannotta	United States	DQ	R 18.5

== T53 ==
=== Records ===
World record	Brent Lakatos (CAN)	46.82	Arbon, Switzerland	1 June 2019
Championship record	Brent Lakatos (CAN)	47.56	London, United Kingdom	18 July 2017

=== Schedule ===
Date	Time	Round
9 November	10:55	Round 1
9 November	20:27	Final

=== Round 1 ===
First 3 of each heat (Q) and the next 2 fastest (q) advance to the final.

Rang	Heat	Lane	Sport Class	Name	Nationality	Time	Notes
1	2	7	T53	Pongsakorn Paeyo	Thailand	48.24	Q, SB
2	1	7	T53	Pierre Fairbank	France	49.28	Q, SB
3	2	6	T53	Yoo Byung-hoon	South Korea	49.40	Q, PB
4	1	4	T53	Brent Lakatos	Canada	49.99	Q
5	1	8	T53	Brian Siemann	United States	50.24	Q, SB
6	2	5	T53	Yang Shaoqiao	China	50.31	Q
7	1	5	T53	Pichet Krungget	Thailand	50.80	q
8	2	8	T53	Nicolas Brignone	France	50.81	q
9	1	3	T53	Masaberee Arsae	Thailand	51.53	PB
10	2	4	T53	Vitalii Gritsenko	Russia	51.83	
11	2	9	T53	Diego Gastaldi	Italy	52.57	
12	2	3	T53	Abdulrahman Al-Qurashi	Saudi Arabia	52.61	PB
13	1	6	T53	Ariosvaldo Fernandes da Silva	Brazil	52.94	
14	2	2	T53	Maclean Atsu Dzidzienyo	Ghana	58.45	
	1	9	T53	Fahad Alganaidl	Saudi Arabia	DNS	

=== Final ===
The final was started on 9 November at 20:27.

Rank	Lane	Sport Class	Name	Nationality	Time	Notes
1st place, gold medalist(s)	5	T53	Pongsakorn Paeyo	Thailand	48.08	SB
2nd place, silver medalist(s)	4	T53	Brent Lakatos	Canada	48.33	
3rd place, bronze medalist(s)	8	T53	Yang Shaoqiao	China	49.52	
4	7	T53	Yoo Byung-hoon	South Korea	49.63	
5	6	T53	Pierre Fairbank	France	50.02	
6	9	T53	Brian Siemann	United States	51.17	
7	3	T53	Nicolas Brignone	France	52.11	
	2	T53	Pichet Krungget	Thailand	DQ	R 18.5

== T54 ==
=== Records ===
World record	Yassine Gharbi (TUN)	43.46	Sharjah, United Arab Emirates	19 March 2018
Championship record	Yassine Gharbi (TUN)	45.57	London, United Kingdom	20 July 2017

=== Schedule ===
Date	Time	Round
11 November	20:35	Round 1
12 November	11:24	Semifinals
12 November	19:38	Final

=== Round 1 ===
First 3 of each heat (Q) and the next 4 fastest (q) advance to the semifinals.

Rang	Heat	Lane	Sport Class	Name	Nationality	Time	Notes
1	4	4	T54	Yassine Gharbi	Tunisia	47.05	Q
2	3	6	T54	Zhang Yong	China	47.58	Q
3	4	7	T54	Alexey Bychenok	Russia	47.85	Q
4	1	5	T54	Dai Yunqiang	China	48.07	Q
5	2	4	T54	Samuel Carter	Australia	48.21	Q
6	3	8	T54	Jaenal Aripin	Indonesia	48.30	Q, PB
7	3	7	T54	Jake Lappin	Australia	48.36	Q
8	4	5	T54	Leo-Pekka Tähti	Finland	48.42	Q
9	1	7	T54	Richard Chiassaro	United Kingdom	48.44	Q
10	3	5	T54	Kenny van Weeghel	Netherlands	48.55	q
11	2	5	T54	Liu Yang	China	48.56	Q
12	4	6	T54	Putharet Khongrak	Thailand	48.63	q
13	4	8	T54	Juan Pablo Cervantes García	Mexico	48.69	q
14	2	7	T54	Nathan Maguire	United Kingdom	48.74	Q
15	1	6	T54	Saichon Konjen	Thailand	48.83	Q
16	2	6	T54	Tomoki Suzuki	Japan	49.28	q
17	1	4	T54	Julien Casoli	France	49.29	
18	3	9	T54	Cedric Ravet	Mauritius	50.11	SB
19	3	4	T54	Yuki Nishi	Japan	50.71	
20	1	8	T54	Alhassane Baldé	Germany	50.84	
21	1	3	T54	Alejandro Maldonado	Argentina	51.10	
22	2	8	T54	Ekkachai Janthon	Thailand	51.26	
	2	9	T54	Arsen Kurbanov	Russia	DQ	R 18.5
	1	9	T54	Smbat Karapetyan	Armenia	DQ	R 18.5
	4	9	T54	Stas Nazaryan	Armenia	DQ	R 18.5
	4	3	T54	Jose Manuel Quintero Macias	Spain	DQ	R 18.5
	2	3	T54	Demba Jarju	Gambia	DNS	

=== Semifinals ===
First 3 of each heat (Q) and the next 2 fastest (q) advance to the final.

Rang	Heat	Lane	Sport Class	Name	Nationality	Time	Notes
1	2	4	T54	Yassine Gharbi	Tunisia	46.75	Q
2	1	4	T54	Zhang Yong	China	47.44	Q
3	2	6	T54	Alexey Bychenok	Russia	47.48 (.471)	Q
4	2	7	T54	Samuel Carter	Australia	47.48 (.473)	Q
5	1	5	T54	Richard Chiassaro	United Kingdom	48.00	Q
6	1	6	T54	Dai Yunqiang	China	48.03	Q
7	1	7	T54	Jaenal Aripin	Indonesia	48.09	q, PB
8	2	5	T54	Liu Yang	China	48.16	q
9	2	8	T54	Saichon Konjen	Thailand	48.19	
10	2	3	T54	Kenny van Weeghel	Netherlands	48.24	
11	1	8	T54	Jake Lappin	Australia	48.61	
12	1	9	T54	Leo-Pekka Tähti	Finland	48.79	
13	2	9	T54	Nathan Maguire	United Kingdom	48.81	
14	2	2	T54	Tomoki Suzuki	Japan	49.37	
15	1	3	T54	Juan Pablo Cervantes García	Mexico	49.72	
16	1	2	T54	Putharet Khongrak	Thailand	50.19	

=== Final ===
The final was started on 9 November at 20:35.

Rank	Lane	Sport Class	Name	Nationality	Time	Notes
1st place, gold medalist(s)	6	T54	Yassine Gharbi	Tunisia	46.06	
2nd place, silver medalist(s)	5	T54	Zhang Yong	China	47.26	
3rd place, bronze medalist(s)	4	T54	Richard Chiassaro	United Kingdom	47.58	
4	8	T54	Samuel Carter	Australia	48.04	
5	9	T54	Dai Yunqiang	China	48.11	
6	7	T54	Alexey Bychenok	Russia	48.36	
7	2	T54	Liu Yang	China	48.42	
8	3	T54	Jaenal Aripin	Indonesia	49.07	

== T62 ==
=== Schedule ===
Date	Time	Round
15 November	19:02	Final

=== Final ===
The final was started on 9 November at 20:35.

Rank	Lane	Sport Class	Name	Nationality	Time	Notes
1st place, gold medalist(s)	6	T62	Johannes Floors	Germany	45.78	WR
2nd place, silver medalist(s)	4	T62	Olivier Hendriks	Netherlands	50.79	PB
3rd place, bronze medalist(s)	7	T62	Nick Rogers	United States	52.13	
4	5	T62	Daniel du Plessis	South Africa	55.34	=PB
5	9	T62	Stylianos Malakopoulos	Greece	57.16	PB
6	8	T62	Luca Campeotto	Italy	57.24	
7	3	T62	Ioannis Sevdikalis	Greece	1:01.99	
8	2	T62	David Delespesse	Belgium	1:04.44	PB

== See also ==
- List of IPC world records in athletics
