= 2025 World Para Athletics Championships – Men's 400 metres =

The men's 400 metres events at the 2025 World Para Athletics Championships were held at the Jawaharlal Nehru Stadium, Delhi in New Delhi.

== Medalists ==
| Event | Gold | Silver | Bronze |
|---|---|---|---|
| T11 | Guillaume Junior Atangana; Refugee Paralympic Team | Gautier Makunda; France | Mohammed Ayade; Iraq |
| T12 | Fakhriddin Khamraev; Uzbekistan | Oğuz Akbulut; Turkey | Kissanapong Tisuwan; Thailand |
| T13 | Max Marzillier; Germany | Ryota Fukunaga; Japan | Bose Mokgwathi; Botswana |
| T20 | David Pineda; Spain | Daniel Martins; Brazil | Idris Sufyani; Saudi Arabia |
| T34 | Chaiwat Rattana; Thailand | Rheed McCracken; Australia | Austin Smeenk; Canada |
| T36 | James Turner; Australia | Kirill Glazyrin; Neutral Paralympic Athletes | William Stedman; New Zealand |
| T37 | Bartolomeu Chaves; Brazil | Anton Feoktistov; Neutral Paralympic Athletes | Yeferson Suárez; Colombia |
| T38 | Jaydin Blackwell; United States | José Ramírez; Colombia | Alexandros Diamantis Skourtis; Greece |
| T47 | Aymane El Haddaoui; Morocco | Thomaz Ruan de Moraes; Brazil | Collen Mahlalela; South Africa |
| T52 | Tomoki Sato; Japan | Hirokazu Ueyonabaru; Japan | Tomoya Ito; Japan |
| T53 | Pongsakorn Paeyo; Thailand | Yoo Byung-hoon; South Korea | Vitalii Gritsenko; Neutral Paralympic Athletes |
| T54 | Yassine Gharbi; Tunisia | Athiwat Paeng-nuea; Thailand | Dai Yunqiang; China |
| T62 | Johannes Floors; Germany | Olivier Hendriks; Netherlands | Konstantinos Tourkochoritis; Greece |
| T72 | Carlo Calcagni; Italy | João Matos Cunha; Brazil | Piotr Siejwa; Poland |

== T11 ==
Final

The event took place on 30 September.

| Rank | Lane | Name | Nationality | Time | Notes |
|---|---|---|---|---|---|
| 1st place, gold medalist(s) | 5 | Guillaume Junior Atangana | Refugee Paralympic Team | 51.95 | SB |
| 2nd place, silver medalist(s) | 3 | Gautier Makunda | France | 52.81 | |
| 3rd place, bronze medalist(s) | 7 | Mohammed Ayade | Iraq | 52.85 | |
| 4 | 1 | Enderson Santos | Venezuela | 55.19 | |

Semifinals

The event took place on 29 September. Qualification: First 1 in each heat (Q) and the next 2 fastest (q) advance to the Final

| Rank | Heat | Lane | Name | Nationality | Time | Notes |
|---|---|---|---|---|---|---|
| 1 | 1 | 5 | Guillaume Junior Atangana | Refugee Paralympic Team | 51.96 | Q, SB |
| 2 | 2 | 3 | Gautier Makunda | France | 52.40 | Q |
| 3 | 1 | 7 | Mohammed Ayade | Iraq | 52.43 | q, SB |
| 4 | 2 | 5 | Enderson Santos | Venezuela | 53.29 | q, SB |
| 5 | 2 | 7 | Ananias Shikongo | Namibia | 53.52 | SB |
| 6 | 1 | 3 | Bonkamile Bankaetse | Botswana | 53.78 | PB |
| 7 | 1 | 1 | Robi Kogovšek | Slovenia | 55.05 | |
| 8 | 2 | 1 | John Njoroge Mukiri | Kenya | 55.31 | |

Round 1

The event took place on 28 September. Qualification: First 1 in each heat (Q) and the next 4 fastest (q) advance to the Semi-Final

| Rank | Heat | Lane | Name | Nationality | Time | Notes |
|---|---|---|---|---|---|---|
| 1 | 2 | 3 | Guillaume Junior Atangana | Refugee Paralympic Team | 52.14 | Q, SB |
| 2 | 1 | 5 | Gautier Makunda | France | 52.52 | Q |
| 3 | 2 | 5 | Mohammed Ayade | Iraq | 53.63 | q, SB |
| 4 | 1 | 7 | Ananias Shikongo | Namibia | 54.26 | q, SB |
| 5 | 3 | 5 | Enderson Santos | Venezuela | 54.28 | Q, SB |
| 6 | 4 | 5 | Bonkamile Bankaetse | Botswana | 54.50 | Q, SB |
| 7 | 3 | 7 | John Njoroge Mukiri | Kenya | 54.82 | q |
| 8 | 4 | 7 | Robi Kogovšek | Slovenia | 55.04 | q, PB |
| 9 | 3 | 3 | Fred Masisa | Uganda | 56.84 | |
| | 1 | 3 | François Amba | Cameroon | DNS | |
| | 4 | 3 | Chris Kinda | Namibia | DNS | |
| | 2 | 7 | Stephane Bekale Mvondo | Cameroon | DNS | |

== T12 ==
Final

The event took place on 3 October.

| Rank | Lane | Name | Nationality | Time | Notes |
|---|---|---|---|---|---|
| 1st place, gold medalist(s) | 5 | Fakhriddin Khamraev | Uzbekistan | 50.11 | |
| 2nd place, silver medalist(s) | 7 | Oğuz Akbulut | Turkey | 50.84 | |
| 3rd place, bronze medalist(s) | 1 | Kissanapong Tisuwan | Thailand | 50.98 | |
| | 3 | Mahdi Afri | Morocco | DQ | |

Round 1

The event took place on 1 October. Qualification: First 1 in each heat (Q) and the next 1 fastest (q) advance to the Final

| Rank | Heat | Lane | Name | Nationality | Time | Notes |
|---|---|---|---|---|---|---|
| 1 | 1 | 7 | Fakhriddin Khamraev | Uzbekistan | 49.86 | Q, PB |
| 2 | 2 | 5 | Mahdi Afri | Morocco | 50.31 | Q |
| 3 | 3 | 7 | Oğuz Akbulut | Turkey | 50.71 | Q, SB |
| 4 | 1 | 5 | Kissanapong Tisuwan | Thailand | 51.19 | q |
| 5 | 2 | 3 | Brian Esogon | Kenya | 51.26 | PB |
| 6 | 2 | 7 | Ali Enes Kaya | Turkey | 51.42 | PB |
| 7 | 3 | 3 | Diego Ruiz Garcia | Spain | 51.88 | SB |
| 8 | 3 | 5 | David Johnson | Canada | 52.30 | |
| 9 | 1 | 3 | Lame Monamati | Botswana | 53.55 | SB |
| 10 | 3 | 1 | Stanley Katlego Matutu | Botswana | 56.32 | |
| | 1 | 1 | Roman Tarasov | Neutral Paralympic Athletes | DNS | |

== T13 ==
Final

The event took place on 3 October.

| Rank | Lane | Name | Nationality | Time | Notes |
|---|---|---|---|---|---|
| 1st place, gold medalist(s) | 8 | Max Marzillier | Germany | 49.00 | |
| 2nd place, silver medalist(s) | 5 | Ryota Fukunaga | Japan | 49.03 | SB |
| 3rd place, bronze medalist(s) | 7 | Bose Mokgwathi | Botswana | 49.66 | PB |
| 4 | 6 | James Ethan Ang | Singapore | 51.46 | |
| 5 | 4 | Dzmitry Kaskevich | Neutral Paralympic Athletes | 51.48 | SB |
| 6 | 9 | Edwin Masuge | Botswana | 51.65 | |
| 7 | 2 | Jairus Ongeta Okora | Kenya | 51.93 | PB |
| 8 | 3 | Mikail Al | Turkey | 52.36 | PB |

Round 1

The event took place on 2 October. Qualification: First 3 in each heat (Q) and the next 2 fastest (q) advance to the Final

| Rank | Heat | Lane | Name | Nationality | Time | Notes |
|---|---|---|---|---|---|---|
| 1 | 1 | 7 | Ryota Fukunaga | Japan | 49.14 | Q, SB |
| 2 | 1 | 6 | Bose Mokgwathi | Botswana | 50.20 | Q, PB |
| 3 | 2 | 8 | James Ethan Ang | Singapore | 51.30 | Q, PB |
| 4 | 2 | 6 | Max Marzillier | Germany | 51.31 | Q |
| 5 | 2 | 7 | Edwin Masuge | Botswana | 51.82 | Q |
| 6 | 1 | 5 | Dzmitry Kaskevich | Neutral Paralympic Athletes | 52.15 | Q, SB |
| 7 | 2 | 5 | Mikail Al | Turkey | 52.47 | q, PB |
| 8 | 1 | 8 | Jairus Ongeta Okora | Kenya | 53.05 | q, PB |
| 9 | 1 | 4 | Bounphet Thepthida | Laos | 55.25 | SB |

== T20 ==
Final

The event took place on 30 September.

| Rank | Lane | Name | Nationality | Time | Notes |
|---|---|---|---|---|---|
| 1st place, gold medalist(s) | 5 | David Pineda | Spain | 47.12 | CR |
| 2nd place, silver medalist(s) | 2 | Daniel Martins | Brazil | 47.50 | |
| 3rd place, bronze medalist(s) | 8 | Idris Sufyani | Saudi Arabia | 47.55 | PB |
| 4 | 6 | Charles-Antoine Kouakou | France | 48.01 | SB |
| 5 | 4 | Muhammad Ammar Aiman Nor Azmi | Malaysia | 48.04 | SB |
| 6 | 9 | Alfin Nomleni | Indonesia | 48.05 | |
| 7 | 7 | Deliber Rodríguez | Spain | 48.12 | SB |
| | 3 | Daniel Antonio | Portugal | DNF | |

Round 1

The event took place on 29 September. Qualification: First 3 in each heat (Q) and the next 2 fastest (q) advance to the Final

| Rank | Heat | Lane | Name | Nationality | Time | Notes |
|---|---|---|---|---|---|---|
| 1 | 2 | 9 | David Pineda | Spain | 47.45 | Q, CR |
| 2 | 2 | 8 | Idris Sufyani | Saudi Arabia | 47.59 | Q, PB |
| 3 | 2 | 7 | Alfin Nomleni | Indonesia | 48.03 | Q, PB |
| 4 | 1 | 5 | Deliber Rodríguez | Spain | 48.39 | Q, SB |
| 5 | 2 | 4 | Daniel Martins | Brazil | 48.42 | q |
| 6 | 1 | 3 | Charles-Antoine Kouakou | France | 48.58 | Q, SB |
| 7 | 1 | 7 | Muhammad Ammar Aiman Nor Azmi | Malaysia | 48.72 | Q, SB |
| 8 | 1 | 6 | Daniel Antonio | Portugal | 48.76 | q, SB |
| 9 | 1 | 9 | Jhan Carlos Wisdom | Panama | 49.82 | SB |
| 10 | 1 | 8 | Samuel Oliveira Conceição | Brazil | 50.15 | |
| 11 | 2 | 5 | Daigo Usuki | Japan | 52.09 | |
| | 1 | 4 | Yovanni Philippe | Mauritius | DNF | |
| | 2 | 6 | Jhon Obando | Colombia | DNF | |

== T34 ==
Final

The event took place on 29 September.

| Rank | Lane | Name | Nationality | Time | Notes |
|---|---|---|---|---|---|
| 1st place, gold medalist(s) | 7 | Chaiwat Rattana | Thailand | 48.01 | |
| 2nd place, silver medalist(s) | 6 | Rheed McCracken | Australia | 48.67 | |
| 3rd place, bronze medalist(s) | 9 | Austin Smeenk | Canada | 49.43 | |
| 4 | 3 | Ali Radi Arshid | Qatar | 49.52 | |
| 5 | 8 | Walid Ktila | Tunisia | 49.60 | |
| 6 | 4 | Roberto Michel | Mauritius | 50.63 | |
| 7 | 5 | Henry Manni | Finland | 51.01 | |
| | 2 | Mohamad Othman | United Arab Emirates | DQ | |

.

Round 1

The event took place on 28 September. Qualification: First 3 in each heat (Q) and the next 2 fastest (q) advance to the Final

| Rank | Heat | Lane | Name | Nationality | Time | Notes |
|---|---|---|---|---|---|---|
| 1 | 2 | 8 | Chaiwat Rattana | Thailand | 47.94 | Q, WR |
| 2 | 1 | 5 | Rheed McCracken | Australia | 49.17 | Q |
| 3 | 2 | 6 | Walid Ktila | Tunisia | 49.25 | Q |
| 4 | 2 | 5 | Austin Smeenk | Canada | 49.46 | Q |
| 5 | 2 | 4 | Ali Radi Arshid | Qatar | 49.51 | q, PB |
| 6 | 1 | 8 | Henry Manni | Finland | 50.09 | Q, ER |
| 7 | 1 | 6 | Roberto Michel | Mauritius | 50.50 | Q |
| 8 | 1 | 7 | Mohamad Othman | United Arab Emirates | 51.01 | q |
| 9 | 2 | 7 | Ahmed Nawad | United Arab Emirates | 52.03 | |
| 10 | 1 | 4 | Mohammed Rashid Al-Kubaisi | Qatar | 54.62 | PB |

== T36 ==
Final

The event took place on 29 September.

| Rank | Lane | Name | Nationality | Time | Notes |
|---|---|---|---|---|---|
| 1st place, gold medalist(s) | 5 | James Turner | Australia | 52.18 | SB |
| 2nd place, silver medalist(s) | 6 | Kirill Glazyrin | Neutral Paralympic Athletes | 52.25 | ER |
| 3rd place, bronze medalist(s) | 8 | William Stedman | New Zealand | 53.05 | SB |
| 4 | 7 | Fakhr Eddine Thelaidjia | Algeria | 53.75 | AF |
| 5 | 9 | Takeru Matsumoto | Japan | 55.79 | SB |
| 6 | 3 | David Khachaturian | Armenia | 56.98 | SB |
| 7 | 4 | Alexis Chávez | Argentina | 57.08 | SB |
| 8 | 2 | Mykhailo Pronin | Ukraine | 57.29 | PB |

Round 1

The event took place on 28 September. Qualification: First 3 in each heat (Q) and the next 2 fastest (q) advance to the Final

| Rank | Heat | Lane | Name | Nationality | Time | Notes |
|---|---|---|---|---|---|---|
| 1 | 2 | 6 | Fakhr Eddine Thelaidjia | Algeria | 54.28 | Q, SB |
| 2 | 1 | 6 | William Stedman | New Zealand | 55.16 | Q |
| 3 | 2 | 4 | James Turner | Australia | 55.32 | Q |
| 4 | 1 | 4 | Kirill Glazyrin | Neutral Paralympic Athletes | 56.81 | Q, PB |
| 5 | 2 | 8 | Takeru Matsumoto | Japan | 57.05 | Q, SB |
| 6 | 1 | 5 | Alexis Chávez | Argentina | 57.29 | Q, SB |
| 7 | 1 | 7 | David Khachaturian | Armenia | 57.35 | q, SB |
| 8 | 2 | 5 | Mykhailo Pronin | Ukraine | 57.48 | q, PB |
| 9 | 1 | 8 | Ahmad Fizzi Rosni | Malaysia | 57.81 | SB |
| 10 | 2 | 7 | Loukas Ioannis Protonotarios | Greece | 1:14.68 | |

== T37 ==
Final

The event took place on 2 October.

| Rank | Lane | Name | Nationality | Time | Notes |
|---|---|---|---|---|---|
| 1st place, gold medalist(s) | 9 | Bartolomeu Chaves | Brazil | 50.13 | CR |
| 2nd place, silver medalist(s) | 7 | Anton Feoktistov | Neutral Paralympic Athletes | 50.64 | PB |
| 3rd place, bronze medalist(s) | 8 | Yeferson Suárez | Colombia | 51.19 | |
| 4 | 6 | Amen Allah Tissaoui | Tunisia | 51.38 | SB |
| 5 | 5 | Michał Kotkowski | Poland | 52.22 | SB |
| 6 | 2 | Yaroslav Okapinskyi | Ukraine | 52.57 | SB |
| 7 | 3 | Chermen Kobesov | Neutral Paralympic Athletes | 52.79 | SB |
| 8 | 4 | Petrus Karuli | Namibia | 54.76 | =PB |

Round 1

The event took place on 1 October. Qualification: First 3 in each heat (Q) and the next 2 fastest (q) advance to the Final

| Rank | Heat | Lane | Name | Nationality | Time | Notes |
|---|---|---|---|---|---|---|
| 1 | 1 | 9 | Yeferson Suárez | Colombia | 51.78 | Q |
| 2 | 1 | 8 | Anton Feoktistov | Neutral Paralympic Athletes | 52.30 | Q, SB |
| 3 | 1 | 7 | Bartolomeu Chaves | Brazil | 52.32 | Q |
| 4 | 1 | 5 | Yaroslav Okapinskyi | Ukraine | 52.84 | q, SB |
| 5 | 1 | 6 | Chermen Kobesov | Neutral Paralympic Athletes | 53.24 | q, SB |
| 6 | 2 | 5 | Michał Kotkowski | Poland | 53.87 | Q, SB |
| 7 | 2 | 8 | Amen Allah Tissaoui | Tunisia | 54.93 | Q, SB |
| 8 | 1 | 4 | Ronald Rich | Botswana | 55.03 | |
| 9 | 2 | 4 | Petrus Karuli | Namibia | 55.30 | Q, SB |
| 10 | 2 | 7 | Adonys Rosa | Dominican Republic | 56.67 | PB |
| 11 | 2 | 9 | Mykola Raiskyi | Ukraine | 59.44 | |
| | 2 | 6 | Andrey Vdovin | Neutral Paralympic Athletes | DNS | |

== T38 ==
Final

The event took place on 1 October.

| Rank | Lane | Name | Nationality | Time | Notes |
|---|---|---|---|---|---|
| 1st place, gold medalist(s) | 7 | Jaydin Blackwell | United States | 48.00 | WR |
| 2nd place, silver medalist(s) | 8 | José Ramírez | Colombia | 49.18 | PB |
| 3rd place, bronze medalist(s) | 6 | Alexandros Diamantis Skourtis | Greece | 49.74 | ER |
| 4 | 5 | Ryan Medrano | United States | 50.09 | |
| 5 | 3 | Zachary Gingras | Canada | 50.83 | SB |
| 6 | 4 | Ullrich Muller | Australia | 50.96 | PB |
| 7 | 9 | Akira Nandan Banothu | India | 51.16 | |
| 8 | 2 | José Rodolfo Chessani | Mexico | 51.57 | SB |

Round 1

The event took place on 30 September. Qualification: First 3 in each heat (Q) and the next 2 fastest (q) advance to the Final

| Rank | Heat | Lane | Name | Nationality | Time | Notes |
|---|---|---|---|---|---|---|
| 1 | 1 | 5 | Jaydin Blackwell | United States | 49.05 | Q |
| 2 | 1 | 7 | Alexandros Diamantis Skourtis | Greece | 49.97 | Q, ER |
| 3 | 2 | 8 | Ryan Medrano | United States | 50.13 | Q |
| 4 | 2 | 6 | José Ramírez | Colombia | 50.19 | Q |
| 5 | 1 | 8 | Akira Nandan Banothu | India | 50.55 | Q, PB |
| 6 | 1 | 6 | Zachary Gingras | Canada | 51.11 | q, SB |
| 7 | 2 | 9 | Ullrich Muller | Australia | 51.21 | Q, PB |
| 8 | 1 | 9 | José Rodolfo Chessani | Mexico | 52.17 | q, SB |
| 9 | 1 | 4 | Cooper Robb-Jackson | Australia | 54.63 | PB |
| 10 | 2 | 4 | Ben Eppelstun | Australia | 55.09 | |
| 11 | 2 | 5 | Jassiel Torres López | Puerto Rico | 56.90 | |
| 12 | 2 | 7 | Andreas Beros | Cyprus | 57.89 | |

== T47 ==
Final

The event took place on 2 October.

| Rank | Lane | Name | Nationality | Time | Notes |
|---|---|---|---|---|---|
| 1st place, gold medalist(s) | 7 | Aymane El Haddaoui | Morocco | 47.14 | |
| 2nd place, silver medalist(s) | 9 | Thomaz Ruan de Moraes | Brazil | 47.90 | SB |
| 3rd place, bronze medalist(s) | 8 | Collen Mahlalela | South Africa | 48.04 | PB |
| 4 | 5 | Dilip Gavit | India | 48.61 | |
| 5 | 6 | Luis Daniel Lopez Morales | Venezuela | 49.19 | SB |
| 6 | 4 | Daniel Milanes | Cuba | 49.31 | |
| 7 | 3 | Riccardo Bagaini | Italy | 50.29 | |
| | 2 | Nur Ferry Pradana | Indonesia | DNS | |

Round 1

The event took place on 1 October. Qualification: First 3 in each heat (Q) and the next 2 fastest (q) advance to the Final

| Rank | Heat | Lane | Name | Nationality | Time | Notes |
|---|---|---|---|---|---|---|
| 1 | 2 | 8 | Aymane El Haddaoui | Morocco | 47.93 | Q |
| 2 | 2 | 7 | Dilip Gavit | India | 48.20 | Q, AS |
| 3 | 2 | 5 | Daniel Milanes | Cuba | 48.54 | Q, PB |
| 4 | 1 | 8 | Collen Mahlalela | South Africa | 48.76 | Q, SB |
| 5 | 1 | 7 | Luis Daniel Lopez Morales | Venezuela | 49.28 | Q, SB |
| 6 | 2 | 6 | Riccardo Bagaini | Italy | 49.82 | q |
| 7 | 1 | 5 | Thomaz Ruan de Moraes | Brazil | 50.18 | Q |
| 8 | 2 | 4 | Nur Ferry Pradana | Indonesia | 50.48 | q, SB |
| 9 | 1 | 4 | Marufjon Murodulloev | Uzbekistan | 51.31 | SB |
| 10 | 1 | 6 | Venswa Kaddu | Uganda | 51.74 | PB |

== T52 ==
Final

The event took place on 1 October.

| Rank | Lane | Name | Nationality | Time | Notes |
|---|---|---|---|---|---|
| 1st place, gold medalist(s) | 8 | Tomoki Sato | Japan | 54.21 | |
| 2nd place, silver medalist(s) | 6 | Hirokazu Ueyonabaru | Japan | 59.55 | |
| 3rd place, bronze medalist(s) | 5 | Tomoya Ito | Japan | 59.66 | |
| 4 | 9 | Salvador Hernández | Mexico | 1:01.67 | PB |
| 5 | 4 | Jerrold Mangliwan | Philippines | 1:02.12 | SB |
| 6 | 7 | Leonardo de Jesús Pérez Juárez | Mexico | 1:02.27 | |
| 7 | 2 | Fabian Blum | Switzerland | 1:03.22 | |
| 8 | 3 | Thomas Geierspichler | Austria | 1:05.03 | |

Round 1

The event took place on 30 September. Qualification: First 3 in each heat (Q) and the next 2 fastest (q) advance to the Final

| Rank | Heat | Lane | Name | Nationality | Time | Notes |
|---|---|---|---|---|---|---|
| 1 | 1 | 8 | Tomoki Sato | Japan | 57.98 | Q |
| 2 | 2 | 8 | Tomoya Ito | Japan | 58.33 | Q |
| 3 | 1 | 6 | Hirokazu Ueyonabaru | Japan | 1:00.44 | Q |
| 4 | 2 | 9 | Leonardo de Jesús Pérez Juárez | Mexico | 1:01.76 | Q |
| 5 | 2 | 6 | Jerrold Mangliwan | Philippines | 1:02.96 | Q, SB |
| 6 | 1 | 7 | Salvador Hernández | Mexico | 1:03.51 | Q, SB |
| 7 | 1 | 5 | Fabian Blum | Switzerland | 1:03.68 | q |
| 8 | 2 | 7 | Thomas Geierspichler | Austria | 1:05.33 | q |
| 9 | 1 | 4 | Jeong Jong-dae | South Korea | 1:06.53 | SB |
| 10 | 2 | 5 | Kęstutis Skučas | Lithuania | 1:06.92 | SB |
| 11 | 2 | 4 | Jonathan Thorsell | Sweden | 1:07.66 | PB |

== T53 ==
Final

The event took place on 29 September.

| Rank | Lane | Name | Nationality | Time | Notes |
|---|---|---|---|---|---|
| 1st place, gold medalist(s) | 5 | Pongsakorn Paeyo | Thailand | 46.81 | SB |
| 2nd place, silver medalist(s) | 6 | Yoo Byung-hoon | South Korea | 49.29 | =PB |
| 3rd place, bronze medalist(s) | 7 | Vitalii Gritsenko | Neutral Paralympic Athletes | 49.37 | |
| 4 | 9 | Masaberee Arsae | Thailand | 49.70 | SB |
| 5 | 8 | Mohamed Nidhal Khelifi | Tunisia | 50.61 | |
| 6 | 4 | Abdulrahman Al-Qurashi | Saudi Arabia | 51.19 | |
| 7 | 2 | Pierre Fairbank | France | 51.38 | |
| 8 | 3 | Bob Hunt | United States | 53.18 | |

Round 1

The event took place on 29 September. Qualification: First 3 in each heat (Q) and the next 2 fastest (q) advance to the Final

| Rank | Heat | Lane | Name | Nationality | Time | Notes |
|---|---|---|---|---|---|---|
| 1 | 2 | 4 | Pongsakorn Paeyo | Thailand | 47.80 | Q |
| 2 | 1 | 4 | Vitalii Gritsenko | Neutral Paralympic Athletes | 49.24 | Q, SB |
| 3 | 1 | 8 | Yoo Byung-hoon | South Korea | 49.48 | Q, SB |
| 4 | 2 | 8 | Mohamed Nidhal Khelifi | Tunisia | 49.81 | Q, AF |
| 5 | 1 | 6 | Masaberee Arsae | Thailand | 49.91 | Q, SB |
| 6 | 1 | 5 | Pierre Fairbank | France | 50.55 | q |
| 7 | 2 | 6 | Abdulrahman Al-Qurashi | Saudi Arabia | 50.58 | Q, SB |
| 8 | 2 | 7 | Bob Hunt | United States | 51.42 | q, PB |
| 9 | 2 | 5 | Maxime Carabin | Belgium | 52.91 | |
| 10 | 1 | 7 | Johannes Balbaert | Belgium | 55.99 | PB |

== T54 ==
Final

The event took place on 30 September.

| Rank | Lane | Name | Nationality | Time | Notes |
|---|---|---|---|---|---|
| 1st place, gold medalist(s) | 6 | Yassine Gharbi | Tunisia | 44.96 | CR |
| 2nd place, silver medalist(s) | 7 | Athiwat Paeng-nuea | Thailand | 45.29 | |
| 3rd place, bronze medalist(s) | 8 | Dai Yunqiang | China | 45.44 | SB |
| 4 | 5 | Nathan Maguire | Great Britain | 45.86 | |
| 5 | 9 | Mamudo Balde | Portugal | 46.67 | |
| 6 | 3 | Hu Yang | China | 46.83 | |
| 7 | 4 | Albaraa Al-Qarni | Saudi Arabia | 47.19 | |
| 8 | 2 | Samuel Carter | Australia | 47.46 | |

Round 1

The event took place on 29 September. Qualification: First 2 in each heat (Q) and the next 2 fastest (q) advance to the Final

| Rank | Heat | Lane | Name | Nationality | Time | Notes |
|---|---|---|---|---|---|---|
| 1 | 3 | 4 | Athiwat Paeng-nuea | Thailand | 45.01 | Q, CR |
| 2 | 3 | 6 | Yassine Gharbi | Tunisia | 45.59 | Q, SB |
| 3 | 2 | 3 | Nathan Maguire | Great Britain | 46.25 | Q |
| 4 | 2 | 7 | Mamudo Balde | Portugal | 46.39 | Q, PB |
| 5 | 1 | 3 | Dai Yunqiang | China | 46.51 | Q, SB |
| 6 | 2 | 5 | Hu Yang | China | 46.64 | q, SB |
| 7 | 1 | 9 | Albaraa Al-Qarni | Saudi Arabia | 46.67 | Q, SB |
| 8 | 1 | 6 | Samuel Carter | Australia | 46.91 | q |
| 9 | 3 | 7 | Zhang Ying | China | 47.19 | SB |
| 10 | 1 | 5 | Phiphatphong Sianglam | Thailand | 47.25 | SB |
| 11 | 2 | 8 | Putharet Khongrak | Thailand | 47.42 | SB |
| 12 | 1 | 8 | Gabriel Sosa | Argentina | 47.42 | |
| 13 | 3 | 9 | Lito Anker | Netherlands | 47.81 | |
| 14 | 3 | 8 | Juan Pablo Cervantes García | Mexico | 47.97 | |
| 15 | 3 | 5 | Cedric Ravet | Mauritius | 49.19 | |
| 16 | 2 | 4 | Luke Bailey | Australia | 49.28 | |
| 17 | 1 | 7 | Jaenal Aripin | Indonesia | 50.01 | SB |
| 18 | 1 | 4 | Smbat Karapetyan | Armenia | 56.73 | PB |
| 19 | 3 | 3 | Arman Sargsyan | Armenia | 1:03.57 | PB |
| | 2 | 6 | Raphael Botsyo Nkegbe | Ghana | DQ | |

== T62 ==
Final

The event took place on 5 October.

| Rank | Lane | Name | Nationality | Time | Notes |
|---|---|---|---|---|---|
| 1st place, gold medalist(s) | 6 | Johannes Floors | Germany | 45.39 | CR |
| 2nd place, silver medalist(s) | 7 | Olivier Hendriks | Netherlands | 47.13 | SB |
| 3rd place, bronze medalist(s) | 5 | Konstantinos Tourkochoritis | Greece | 57.05 | |
| 4 | 8 | Alan Oliveira Becker | Brazil | 59.03 | |
| 5 | 4 | Oskar Kobin | Estonia | 1:06.77 | |

== T72 ==
Final

The event took place on 28 September.

| Rank | Lane | Name | Nationality | Time | Notes |
|---|---|---|---|---|---|
| 1st place, gold medalist(s) | 5 | Carlo Calcagni | Italy | 59.91 | |
| 2nd place, silver medalist(s) | 7 | João Matos Cunha | Brazil | 1:07.23 | |
| 3rd place, bronze medalist(s) | 6 | Piotr Siejwa | Poland | 1:14.40 | SB |
| 4 | 8 | Deividas Podobajevas | Lithuania | 1:16.19 | |
| 5 | 4 | Wojciech Kukiełka | Poland | 1:16.82 | |
| 6 | 3 | Axel Colling | Sweden | 1:24.60 | |
| | 9 | Igor Markov | Lithuania | DQ | |

Round 1

The event took place on 27 September. Qualification: First 3 in each heat (Q) and the next 2 fastest (q) advance to the Final

| Rank | Heat | Lane | Name | Nationality | Time | Notes |
|---|---|---|---|---|---|---|
| 1 | 1 | 8 | Carlo Calcagni | Italy | 59.47 | Q |
| 2 | 1 | 6 | João Matos Cunha | Brazil | 1:10.71 | Q |
| 3 | 2 | 6 | Piotr Siejwa | Poland | 1:14.55 | Q, SB |
| 4 | 2 | 7 | Deividas Podobajevas | Lithuania | 1:14.74 | Q |
| 5 | 1 | 5 | Wojciech Kukiełka | Poland | 1:16.29 | Q, SB |
| 6 | 1 | 7 | Igor Markov | Lithuania | 1:17.88 | q, PB |
| 7 | 1 | 4 | Axel Colling | Sweden | 1:23.78 | q, PB |
| | 2 | 8 | Finlay Jonathan Menzies | Great Britain | DQ | |
| | 2 | 5 | Vinicius Marques Krieger Quintino | Brazil | DQ | |
| | 2 | 4 | Arturas Plodunovas | Lithuania | DQ | |
