= Athletics at the 2020 Summer Paralympics – Men's 400 metres T20 =

Men's 400 metres T20 at the XVI Paralympic Games
- Venue: Tokyo National Stadium
- Dates: 30 August 2021 (heats); 31 August 2021 (final)
- Competitors: 13 from 10 nations
- Winning time: 47.63

Medalists
1st place, gold medalist(s)		Charles-Antoine Kouakou	France
2nd place, silver medalist(s)		Luis Felipe Rodríguez Bolívar	Venezuela
3rd place, bronze medalist(s)		Columba Blango	Great Britain

The men's 400 metres T20 event at the 2020 Summer Paralympics in Tokyo, took place between 30 and 31 August 2021.

The T20 category is for athletes with intellectual impairment. T20 athletes have an IQ score of 75 or less.

== Records ==
Prior to the competition, the existing records were as follows:

World record	Daniel Martins (BRA)	46.86	São Paulo, Brazil	27 April 2019
Paralympic record	Daniel Martins (BRA)	47.22	Rio de Janeiro, Brazil	9 September 2016

Area	Time	Athlete	Nation
Africa	48.55	Gracelino Barbosa	Cape Verde
America	46.86 WR	Daniel Martins	Brazil
Asia	49.32	Nasharuddin Mohd	Malaysia
Europe	47.90	Columba Blango	Great Britain
Oceania	50.71	Alberto Campbell-Staines	Australia

== Results ==
=== Heats ===
Heat 1 took place on 30 August 2021, at 19:49:

Rank	Lane	Name	Nationality	Time	Notes
1	2	Deliber Rodríguez Ramírez	Spain	48.57	Q, PB
2	4	Charles-Antoine Kouakou	France	48.85	Q
3	3	Anderson Alexander Colorado Mina	Ecuador	48.89	Q, SB
4	7	Ndiaga Dieng	Italy	48.91	q, PB
5	5	Daniel Martins	Brazil	50.10	SB
6	8	Edixon Eduardo Pirela Yepez	Venezuela	50.59	
7	6	Alberto Campbell-Staines	Jamaica	51.55	

Heat 2 took place on 30 August 2021, at 19:56:

Rank	Lane	Name	Nationality	Time	Notes
1	5	Luis Felipe Rodríguez Bolívar	Venezuela	48.72	Q
2	3	Columba Blango	Great Britain	48.78	Q
3	7	Damián Carcelén	Ecuador	49.35	Q, SB
4	6	Sandro Patrício Correia	Portugal	49.86	q
5	8	Jhan Carlos Wisdom Lungrin	Panama	50.21	SB
6	4	Gustavo Henrique de Oliveira	Brazil	51.12	

=== Final ===
The final took place on 31 August 2021, at 19:11:

Rank	Lane	Name	Nationality	Time	Notes
1st place, gold medalist(s)	7	Charles-Antoine Kouakou	France	47.63	AR
2nd place, silver medalist(s)	6	Luis Felipe Rodríguez Bolívar	Venezuela	47.71	PB
3rd place, bronze medalist(s)	4	Columba Blango	Great Britain	47.81	PB
4	5	Deliber Rodríguez Ramírez	Spain	48.05	PB
5	2	Ndiaga Dieng	Italy	48.42	PB
6	9	Anderson Alexander Colorado Mina	Ecuador	48.58	SB
7	3	Sandro Patrício Correia	Portugal	48.79	PB
8	8	Damián Carcelén	Ecuador	49.02	SB
