= 2023 World Para Athletics Championships – Men's 400 metres =

The men's 400 metres at the 2023 World Para Athletics Championships were held across 13 classifications at Charlety Stadium, Paris, France, from 11 to 17 July.

== Medalists ==
Event	Gold	Silver	Bronze
T11	Felipe Gomes; Brazil	Gerard Descarrega; Spain	Timothée Adolphe; France
T12	Rouay Jebabli; Tunisia	Yamil Acosta; Colombia	Oğuz Akbulut; Turkey
T13	Ryota Fukunaga; Japan	Johannes Nambala; Namibia	Buinder Bermúdez; Colombia
T20	Samuel Oliveira; Brazil	Daniel Martins; Brazil	Yovanni Philippe; Mauritius
T34	Chaiwat Rattana; Thailand	Mohamed Hammadi; United Arab Emirates	Austin Smeenk; Canada
T36	James Turner; Australia	William Stedman; New Zealand	Alexis Sebastian Chavez; Argentina
T37	Yaroslav Okapinskyi; Ukraine	Michał Kotkowski; Poland	Bartolomeu Chaves; Brazil
T38	Jaydin Blackwell; United States	Zachary Gingras; Canada	Ali Al-Rikabi; Iraq
T47	Ayoub Sadni; Morocco	Tanner Wright; United States	Jose Martins; Brazil
T52	Maxime Carabin; Belgium	Tomoki Sato; Japan	Tatsuya Ito; Japan
T53	Pongsakorn Paeyo; Thailand	Brent Lakatos; Canada	Brian Siemann; United States
T54	Hu Yang; China	Athiwat Paeng-Nuea; Thailand	Dai Yunqiang; China
T62	Johannes Floors; Germany	Blake Leeper; United States	Olivier Hendriks; Netherlands

== T11 ==
The event took place on 12 July.

Rank	Lane	Name	Nationality	Time	Notes
1st place, gold medalist(s)	7	Felipe Gomes	Brazil	51.00	SB
2nd place, silver medalist(s)	3	Gerard Descarrega	Spain	51.18	
3rd place, bronze medalist(s)	5	Timothée Adolphe	France	51.21	SB
4	1	Gauthier Makunda	France	52.38	

== T12 ==
The final in this event took place at 19:55 on Sat 15 Jul 2023.

Rank	Lane	Name	Nationality	Time	Notes
1st place, gold medalist(s)	5	Rouay Jebabli	Tunisia	48.33	SB
2nd place, silver medalist(s)	3	Yamil Acosta	Colombia	48.73	PB
3rd place, bronze medalist(s)	7	Oguz Akbulut	Turkey	49.24	SB
4	1	Kissanapong Tisuwan	Thailand	51.21	

== T13 ==
The final of this event was held at 20:05 on 15 Jul 2023.

Rank	Lane	Name	Nationality	Time	Notes
1st place, gold medalist(s)	3	Fukunaga Ryota	Japan	47.79	=AR
2nd place, silver medalist(s)	5	Johannes Nambala	Namibia	48.14	SB
3rd place, bronze medalist(s)	4	Buinder Bermúdez	Colombia	49.21	AR
4	8	Jakkarin Dammunee	Thailand	49.41	PB
5	7	Max Marzillier	Germany	49.79	SB
6	6	Ivan Hernandez	Spain	50.18	PB
7	1	Vegard Dragsund Sverd	Norway	50.61	PB
8	2	Edwin Masuge	Botswana	50.67	

== T20 ==
The final of this event was held at 19:45 on 15 Jul 2023.

The applicable records entering the event were as follows:

Record	Athlete
World record	46.86 : Daniel Tavares (Brazil)
Championship record	47.38 : Yovanni Philippe (Mauritius)

Rank	Lane	Name	Nationality	Time	Notes
1st place, gold medalist(s)	3	Samuel Oliveira	Brazil	47.2	CR
2nd place, silver medalist(s)	8	Daniel Tavares	Brazil	47.3	SB
3rd place, bronze medalist(s)	5	Yovanni Philippe	Mauritius	47.48	
4	6	Charles-Antoine Kouakou	France	47.59	AR
5	4	Torkamani Milad Ramazani	Iran	47.8	AR
6	2	Columba Blango	Great Britain	48.9	
7	1	Deliber Rodriguez	Spain	49.01	
	7	Anderson Colorado	Ecuador	DNF	

== T34 ==
The event took place on 11 July.

Rank	Lane	Name	Nationality	Time	Notes
1st place, gold medalist(s)	6	Chaiwat Rattana	Thailand	48.65	WR
2nd place, silver medalist(s)	5	Mohamed Hammadi	United Arab Emirates	49.21	PB
3rd place, bronze medalist(s)	3	Austin Smeenk	Canada	49.32	AR
4	4	Walid Ktila	Tunisia	49.47	
5	7	Gong Wenhao	China	49.69	PB
6	1	Wang Yang	China	50.86	
7	8	Roberto Michel	Mauritius	50.95	
8	2	Rheed McCracken	Australia	51.51	

== T36 ==
The event took place on 11 July.

Rank	Lane	Name	Nationality	Time	Notes
1st place, gold medalist(s)	4	James Turner	Australia	52.26	SB
2nd place, silver medalist(s)	3	William Stedman	New Zealand	53.62	SB
3rd place, bronze medalist(s)	6	Alexis Sebastian Chavez	Argentina	54.57	AR
4	8	Takeru Matsumoto	Japan	55.85	AR
5	5	Krzysztof Ciuksza	Poland	56.47	
6	7	Deng Peicheng	China	59.64	PB
7	2	Marian Petria	Romania	1:06.06	
8	1	Refilwe Mosifane	South Africa	1:10.15	

== T37 ==
The event took place on 14 July.

Rank	Lane	Name	Nationality	Time	Notes
1st place, gold medalist(s)	4	Yaroslav Okapinskyi	Ukraine	52.23	PB
2nd place, silver medalist(s)	3	Michał Kotkowski	Poland	52.62	SB
3rd place, bronze medalist(s)	6	Bartolomeu Chaves	Brazil	53.04	SB
4	8	Sofiane Hamdi	Algeria	54.68	SB
5	5	Mykola Raiskyi	Ukraine	55.47	
6	7	Petrus Karuli	Namibia	56.20	
7	2	Clader Aguas	Ecuador	56.96	PB
8	1	Apisit Taprom	Thailand	58.81	SB

== T38 ==
The event took place on 13 July.

Rank	Lane	Name	Nationality	Time	Notes
1st place, gold medalist(s)	5	Jaydin Blackwell	United States	48.49	WR
2nd place, silver medalist(s)	6	Zachary Gingras	Canada	50.23	PB
3rd place, bronze medalist(s)	7	Ali Al-Rikabi	Iraq	50.61	PB
4	3	Nick Mayhugh	United States	50.98	
5	8	Ryan Medrano	United States	51.07	PB
6	4	José Rodolfo Chessani	Mexico	51.89	
7	2	Mohamed Farhat Chida	Tunisia	51.91	SB
8	1	Angus Hincksman	Australia	55.34	

== T47 ==
The event took place on 14 July.

Rank	Lane	Name	Nationality	Time	Notes
1st place, gold medalist(s)	6	Ayoub Sadni	Morocco	46.78	WR
2nd place, silver medalist(s)	7	Tanner Wright	United States	48.95	PB
3rd place, bronze medalist(s)	3	Jose Martins	Brazil	49.00	PB
4	5	Dilip Mahadu Gavit	India	49.08	PB
5	8	Lucas de Sousa Lima	Brazil	49.43	
6	2	Thomas Normandeau	Canada	50.25	SB
7	1	Nur Ferry Pradana	Indonesia	50.31	
	4	Riccardo Bagaini	Italy	DSQ	

== T52 ==
The event took place on 13 July.

Rank	Lane	Name	Nationality	Time	Notes
1st place, gold medalist(s)	6	Maxime Carabin	Belgium	54.19	WR
2nd place, silver medalist(s)	3	Tomoki Sato	Japan	56.41	
3rd place, bronze medalist(s)	7	Tatsuya Ito	Japan	1:00.84	PB
4	4	Leonardo de Jesús Pérez Juárez	Mexico	1:00.96	SB
5	5	Hirokazu Ueyonabaru	Japan	1:03.27	
6	2	Cristian Torres	Colombia	1:04.64	
7	8	Pichaya Kurattanasiri	Thailand	1:05.46	
8	1	Anthony Bouchard	Canada	1:05.93	

== T53 ==
The event took place on 11 July.

Rank	Lane	Name	Nationality	Time	Notes
1st place, gold medalist(s)	5	Pongsakorn Paeyo	Thailand	46.11	WR
2nd place, silver medalist(s)	6	Brent Lakatos	Canada	46.22	AR
3rd place, bronze medalist(s)	4	Brian Siemann	United States	48.30	PB
4	3	Pichet Krungget	Thailand	48.35	PB
5	8	Pierre Fairbank	France	48.53	AR
6	1	Yoo Byung-hoon	South Korea	49.41	SB
7	7	Nicolas Brignone	France	50.26	SB
8	2	Ariosvaldo Fernandes	Brazil	50.34	SB

== T54 ==
The event took place on 12 July.

Rank	Lane	Name	Nationality	Time	Notes
1st place, gold medalist(s)	5	Hu Yang	China	45.68	
2nd place, silver medalist(s)	6	Athiwat Paeng-Nuea	Thailand	46.23	
3rd place, bronze medalist(s)	3	Dai Yunqiang	China	46.26	
4	7	Daniel Sidbury	Great Britain	46.52	
5	4	Nathan Maguire	Great Britain	46.78	
6	8	Zhang Ying	China	47.93	
7	2	Putharet Khongrak	Thailand	48.07	
8	1	Tomoki Ikoma	Japan	48.64	

== T62 ==
The event took place on 17 July.

Rank	Lane	Name	Nationality	Time	Notes
1st place, gold medalist(s)	3	Johannes Floors	Germany	45.81	SB
2nd place, silver medalist(s)	4	Blake Leeper	United States	47.84	PB
3rd place, bronze medalist(s)	5	Olivier Hendriks	Netherlands	48.76	SB
4	8	Tebogo Mofokeng	South Africa	52.35	SB
	7	Jafa Seapla	Thailand	DQ	
	6	Hunter Woodhall	United States	DNS	
