= Athletics at the 2016 Summer Paralympics – Men's 400 metres T20 =

Men's 400 metres T20 at the XV Paralympic Games
- Venue: Estádio Olímpico João Havelange
- Dates: 8–9 September 2016
- Competitors: 13 from 10 nations

Medalists
1st place, gold medalist(s)		Daniel Martins	Brazil
2nd place, silver medalist(s)		Luis Arturo Paiva	Venezuela
3rd place, bronze medalist(s)		Gracelino Barbosa	Cape Verde

The T20 category is for athletes with intellectual impairment. T20 athletes have an IQ score of 75 or less.

The Athletics at the 2016 Summer Paralympics – Men's 400 metres T20 event at the 2016 Paralympic Games took place on 8–9 September 2016, at the Estádio Olímpico João Havelange.

== Heats ==
=== Heat 1 ===
18:13 8 September 2016:

Rank	Lane	Bib	Name	Nationality	Reaction	Time	Notes
1	4	1149	Daniel Martins	Brazil	0.182	48.70	Q
2	7	1316	Gracelino Barbosa	Cape Verde	0.176	48.77	Q
3	2	1427	Dionibel Rodríguez Rodríguez	Spain	0.159	49.70	Q
4	5	1395	Damian Carcelen	Ecuador	0.173	51.68	q
5	6	1863	Nasharuddin Mohd	Malaysia	0.305	51.75	
6	8	2031	Daniel Pek	Poland	0.267	52.43	
	3	2412	Edixon Pirela	Venezuela	0.160		DSQ

=== Heat 2 ===
18:21 8 September 2016:

Rank	Lane	Bib	Name	Nationality	Reaction	Time	Notes
1	4	2411	Luis Arturo Paiva	Venezuela	0.190	48.43	Q
2	7	1473	Rodrigue Massianga	France	0.187	49.20	Q
3	5	1426	Deliber Rodríguez Ramírez	Spain	0.193	49.37	Q
4	6	1709	Ruud Lorain Flovany Koutiki	Italy	0.158	51.53	q
5	8	1398	Ronny Mauricio Santos Iza	Ecuador	0.151	54.41	
	3	2355	Ty Griffin	United States	0.157		DSQ

== Final ==
11:20 9 September 2016:

Rank	Lane	Bib	Name	Nationality	Reaction	Time	Notes
1st place, gold medalist(s)	4	1149	Daniel Martins	Brazil	0.157	47.22	WR
2nd place, silver medalist(s)	6	2411	Luis Arturo Paiva	Venezuela	0.148	47.83	
3rd place, bronze medalist(s)	5	1316	Gracelino Barbosa	Cape Verde	0.181	48.55	
4	8	1427	Dionibel Rodríguez Rodríguez	Spain	0.215	49.46	
5	7	1426	Deliber Rodríguez Ramírez	Spain	0.208	49.56	
6	3	1473	Rodrigue Massianga	France	0.209	49.71	
7	1	1709	Ruud Lorain Flovany Koutiki	Italy	0.135	51.14	
8	2	1395	Damian Carcelen	Ecuador	0.173	51.80	
