= 2021 World Para Athletics European Championships – Men's 400 metres =

Men's 400 metres

The men's 400 metres events were held on each day of the 2021 World Para Athletics European Championships in Bydgoszcz, Poland.

== Medalists ==
Event	Gold		Silver		Bronze	
T11	Timothée Adolphe (FRA); Guide: Jeffrey Lami	50.76 PB	Gerard Descarrega Puigdevall (ESP); Guide: Guillermo Rojo Gil	51.80	Eduardo Manuel Uceda Novas (ESP); Guide: Jorge Gutierrez Hellin	52.80
T12	Oğuz Akbulut (TUR)	49.33 CR	Jose Luis Fernandez Taular (ESP)	50.46	Anton Kuliatin (RUS)	50.49 PB
T13	Elmir Jabrayilov (AZE)	49.88	Hakan Cira (TUR)	50.06	Aleksandr Shirin (RUS)	50.36 SB
T20	Columba Blango (GBR)	47.90 ER	Charles-Antoine Kouakou (FRA)	48.80	Deliber Rodriguez Ramirez (ESP)	48.98 PB
T36	Evgenii Shvetsov (RUS)	54.32	Krzysztof Ciuksza (POL)	56.54	Loukas Ioannis Protonotarios (GRE)	1:07.22 SB
T37	Andrey Vdovin (RUS)	51.82 SB	Michal Kotkowski (POL)	52.40	Yaroslav Okapinskyi (UKR)	53.47 PB
T38	Anton Feoktistov (RUS)	51.70 CR	Shaun Burrows (GBR)	53.02 PB	Alexander Thomson (GBR)	54.66 PB
T44	Emanuele di Marino (ITA)	56.56 ER	Dzmitry Bartashevich (BLR)	56.91	Not awarded	
T47	Ivan Cvetkovic (SRB)	50.63 PB	John Bridge (GBR)	50.75 PB	Riccardo Bagaini (ITA)	50.92 PB
T52	Thomas Geierspichler (AUT)	1:07.28	Beat Bösch (SUI)	1:08.04	Kęstutis Skučas (LTU)	1:08.20 SB
T53	Pierre Fairbank (FRA)	50.80	Vitalii Gritsenko (RUS)	50.98	Nicolas Brignone (FRA)	51.78
T54	Leo-Pekka Tähti (FIN)	47.72	Kenny van Weeghel (NED)	48.12	Nathan Maguire (GBR)	48.73
T62	Olivier Hendriks (NED)	49.18 PB	Not awarded		Not awarded	
WR world record | ER European record | CR championship record | NR national record | WL world leading | EL European leading | PB personal best | SB seasonal best

== See also ==
- List of IPC world records in athletics
