= Skourtis =

Skourtis (Greek: Σκούρτης) is a Greek surname. Notable people with the surname include:

- Alexandros Diamantis Skourtis (born 2004), Greek para-athlete
- Dimitrios Skourtis (1934–2000), Greek hurdler
- Kyriakos Skourtis, Greek captain
- Kapetan Skourtis, nom de guerre
