= Athletics at the 2020 Summer Paralympics – Men's 400 metres T62 =

Men's 400 metres T62 at the XVI Paralympic Games
- Venue: Tokyo National Stadium
- Dates: 3 September 2021 (final)
- Competitors: 8 from 5 nations
- Winning time: 45.85

Medalists
1st place, gold medalist(s)		Johannes Floors	Germany
2nd place, silver medalist(s)		Olivier Hendriks	Netherlands
3rd place, bronze medalist(s)		Hunter Woodhall	United States

The men's 400 metres T62 event at the 2020 Summer Paralympics in Tokyo, took place on 3 September 2021.

== Records ==
Prior to the competition, the existing records were as follows:

World Record	Johannes Floors (GER)	45.78	Dubai, United Arab Emirates	15 November 2019
Paralympic Record	Vacant	–		

Area	Time	Athlete	Nation
Africa	53.02	Daniel du Plessis	South Africa
America	47.46	Record Mark	
Asia	1:07.77	Record Mark	
Europe	45.78 WR	Johannes Floors	Germany
Oceania	Vacant		

== Results ==
The final took place on 3 September 2021, at 19:33:

Rank	Lane	Name	Nationality	Time	Notes
1st place, gold medalist(s)	6	Johannes Floors	Germany	45.85	SB
2nd place, silver medalist(s)	4	Olivier Hendriks	Netherlands	47.95	PB
3rd place, bronze medalist(s)	7	Hunter Woodhall	United States	48.61	SB
4	9	Tebogo Mofokeng	South Africa	50.09	AR
5	3	Ioannis Sevdikalis	Greece	52.51	PB
6	5	Nick Rogers	United States	52.98	SB
7	8	Daniel du Plessis	South Africa	53.56	
8	2	Stylianos Malakopoulos	Greece	56.75	PB
