= Athletics at the 2024 Summer Paralympics – Men's 400 metres T62 =

Men's 400 metres T62 at the XVII Paralympic Games
- Venue: Stade de France
- Dates: 6 September 2024
- Competitors: 8 from 6 nations
- Winning time: 46.36

Medalists
1st place, gold medalist(s)		Hunter Woodhall	United States
2nd place, silver medalist(s)		Johannes Floors	Germany
3rd place, bronze medalist(s)		Olivier Hendriks	Netherlands

400 metres at the 2024 Summer Paralympics
Men · T11 · T12 · T13 · T20 · T36 · T37 · T38 · T47 · T52 · T53 · T54 · T62
Women · T11 · T12 · T13 · T20 · T37 · T38 · T47 · T53 · T54 ·

The men's 400 metres T62 event at the 2024 Summer Paralympics in Paris, took place on 6 September 2024.

== Records ==
Prior to the competition, the existing records were as follows:

World Record	Hunter Woodhall (USA)	45.70	USA	12 July 2025
Paralympic Record	Johannes Floors (GER)	45.85	(Japan) Tokyo	3 September 2021

Area	Time	Athlete	Location	Date
Africa				
America				
Asia				
Europe				
Oceania				

== Results ==
=== Final ===
Rank	Lane	Athlete	Nation	Time	Notes
1st place, gold medalist(s)	6	Hunter Woodhall	United States	46.36	
2nd place, silver medalist(s)	7	Johannes Floors	Germany	46.90	SB
3rd place, bronze medalist(s)	5	Olivier Hendriks	Netherlands	46.90	PB
4	8	Blake Leeper	United States	47.32	PB
5	4	Alan Oliveira	Brazil	50.30	
6	3	Paul Daniels	South Africa	50.63	PB
7	2	Stylianos Malakopoulos	Greece	52.75	PB
8	9	Daniel du Plessis	South Africa	52.91	
