= Battle of Kremmydi =

1825 battle, Greek War of Independence

- Part of Greek War of Independence
Date	19 April 1825
Location	Kremmydi, few miles inland of South Pylos
Result	Egyptian victory

Belligerents
(Greece) First Hellenic Republic	Egypt Eyalet

Commanders and leaders
Kyriakos Skourtis	Ibrahim Pasha of Egypt

Strength
6,000–7,000 men or 3,000–4,000 men	3,000 men plus 400 cavalry

Casualties and losses
500 killed Many captured	Unknown

The Battle of Kremmydi was a battle of the Greek War of Independence fought on April 19, 1825, in Kremmydi village between the Egyptian forces of Ibrahim Pasha and Greek forces led by Kyriakos Skourtis. The battle ended with an Egyptian victory.

== Background ==
By the beginning of the war, the Ottomans had achieved nothing in the war for three years; they had lost several of their fortresses, including Tripolista; and the Ottomans were defeated in several battles. In this situation, the sultan devised a new plan. The plan was to involve the sultan's most powerful viceroy, Muhammad Ali Pasha of Egypt; it was advised to bring large Egyptian forces into the Peloponnese by sea in exchange for giving the governance of Morea to Muhammad Ali if he succeeded.

The Egyptian armada was huge, as it comprised 54 fighting ships and numerous transporting ships carrying 14,000 men, 2,000 cavalry, and 500 gunners in charge of 150 cannons, the whole fleet amounting to 400 ships. The fleet departed on July 19, 1824. At the end of August, the Turkish and Egyptian fleets met at Bodrum, they engaged a Greek fleet of 70 ships and 5,000 men in a battle but convinced Ibrahim that he could not invade the Peloponnese in that year.

== Prelude ==
On February 23 or 24, 1825, Ibrahim Pasha's fleet of 50 ships completed its crossing from Crete to Methoni. Some 4,000 men and 400 cavalry landed and moved to the citadel of Methoni. Within days of their arrival, the Egyptians had seized Koroni and Methoni fortresses some fifteen miles away, to which the Greeks did not offer resistance. Three weeks later, another force of 7,000 men reached Methoni. Now Ibrahim Pasha was ready to march against the two Greek-held fortresses of Pylos.

Up to this point, the Greeks had done nothing to resist Ibrahim as they were engulfed in a civil war. On March 28, Georgios Kountouriotis set out from Nafplio to take command of the troops headed to Pylos. However, after three days' journey to Tripolista, Kountouriotis felt sick. Kountouriotis appointed the less fortunate Admiral Kyriakos Skourtis, who knew nothing of land warfare and whom Samuel Gridley Howe calls "a stupid fool of a general who does nothing but drink and sleep day and night."

== Battle ==
Ibrahim first aim was the possession of Bay of Pylos only ten miles from Methoni and considered a finest harbor, Ibrahim need to capture the two fortress of Old and new Pylos, the Greek forces marched to meet Ibrahim south of Pylos some 6,000-7,000 men or 3,000-4,000 Greeks who were gathered at the village of Kremmydi some few miles inland south from Pylos bay, Skourtis took up defensive positions in the hills above the village, Ibrahim force had 3,000 men and 400 cavalry, the site of the battle allowed the Egyptians to act freely, the center of the Greek army was virtually undefended and found itself unprotected from the spear-bearing units which launched their coordinate attack that was not broken up by Greek artillery fire.

At the same time, the Egyptian cavalry attacked the Greek forces from the side, which was an almost inaccessible path that had been shown by some local Muslims. Several Greeks resisted this attack, but most of them failed to hold their ground and began retreating to the neighboring mountain villages. Over 500 Greeks were killed and many captured, and the Greek forces were further depleted as a result of this defeat. Many of the Greek soldiers departed to protect their homes and due to Skourtis' terrible leadership. The battle happened on April 19.

== Aftermath ==
The Battle of Kremmydi established Egyptian superiority, and on May 8, the Egyptians defeated the Greeks in the Battle of Sphacteria.

== Bibliography ==
- David Brewer, The Greek War of Independence : the struggle for freedom from Ottoman oppression and the birth of the modern Greek nation, p. 234-40
- Paschalis M. Kitromilides (Editor) & Constantinos Tsoukalas (Editor), The Greek Revolution: A Critical Dictionary, p. 273
