= Olivier Hendriks =

Dutch Paralympic athlete (born 2003)

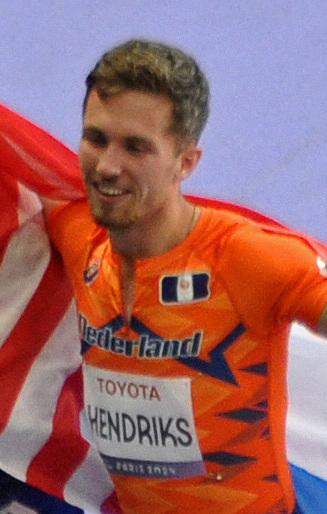
- Hendriks at the 2024 Summer Paralympics

Personal information
- Born: 28 July 2003 (age 22) Delft, Netherlands

Sport
- Country: Netherlands
- Sport: Para-athletics
- Disability class: T62
- Events: 100 metres; 400 metres
Medal record
Men's para-athletics
Representing Netherlands
Paralympic Games
Silver medal – second place	2020 Tokyo	400 m T62
Bronze medal – third place	2024 Paris	400 m T62
World Championships
Silver medal – second place	2019 Dubai	400 m T62
Silver medal – second place	2025 New Delhi	400 m T62
Bronze medal – third place	2023 Paris	400 m T62
Bronze medal – third place	2024 Kobe	400 m T62
European Championships
Gold medal – first place	2021 Bydgoszcz	100 m T64
Gold medal – first place	2021 Bydgoszcz	400 m T62
Silver medal – second place	2018 Berlin	400 m T62

Olivier Hendriks (born 28 July 2003) is a Dutch Paralympic athlete. He is a two-time medalist at the Paralympic Games.

== Career ==
Hendriks won the silver medal in the men's 400 metres T62 event at the 2020 Summer Paralympics held in Tokyo, Japan. He won a silver medal at the 2019 World Para Athletics Championships in the 400 metres T62 event. He is also a three-time medalist, including two golds, at the World Para Athletics European Championships.

In 2023, Hendriks won the bronze medal in the men's 400 metres T62 event at the World Para Athletics Championships held in Paris, France.
