= Idris Sufyani =

Brazilian para athlete (born 1995)

Personal information
- Full name: Idris Ayil Sufyani
- Nationality: Saudi Arabian
- Born: 13 March 1995 (age 31)

Sport
- Sport: Para athletics
- Disability class: T20
Medal record
Men's para-athletics
Representing Saudi Arabia
World Championships
Bronze medal – third place	2025 New Delhi	400 m T20

Idris Ayil Sufyani (born 13 March 1995) is a Saudi Arabian para athlete who competes in T20 sprint events.

== Career ==
Sufyani competed at the 2025 World Para Athletics Championships in the 400 metres T20 event. During the heats he finished with a personal best time of 47.59 seconds to advance to the finals. During the finals he won a bronze medal with a new personal best time of 47.55 seconds.
