= Athletics at the 2020 Summer Paralympics – Men's 400 metres T47 =

Men's 400 metres T47 at the XVI Paralympic Games
- Venue: Tokyo National Stadium
- Dates: 3 September 2021 (heats); 4 September 2021 (final)
- Competitors: 14 from 11 nations
- Winning time: 47.38

Medalists
| 1st place, gold medalist(s) | | Ayoub Sadni | Morocco |
| 2nd place, silver medalist(s) | | Thomaz Ruan de Moraes | Brazil |
| 3rd place, bronze medalist(s) | | Petrúcio Ferreira | Brazil |

The men's 400 metres T47 event at the 2020 Summer Paralympics in Tokyo, took place between 3 and 4 September 2021.

The T47 category is for athletes who have a single below elbow or wrist amputation or similar disability, with normal function in both legs.

== Records ==
Prior to the competition, the existing records were as follows:

| World Record | Heath Francis (AUS) | 47.69 | Beijing, China | 10 September 2008 |
| Paralympic Record | Heath Francis (AUS) | 47.69 | Beijing, China | 10 September 2008 |

| Area | Time | Athlete | Nation |
|---|---|---|---|
| Africa | 48.71 | Ayoub Sadni | Morocco |
| America | 47.87 | Petrúcio Ferreira | Brazil |
| Asia | 48.64 | Wang Hao | China |
| Europe | 48.45 | Günther Matzinger | Austria |
| Oceania | 47.69 WR | Heath Francis | Australia |

== Results ==
=== Heats ===
Heat 1 took place on 3 September 2021, at 10:38:

| Rank | Lane | Name | Nationality | Class | Time | Notes |
|---|---|---|---|---|---|---|
| 1 | 2 | Ayoub Sadni | Morocco | T47 | 47.82 | Q, PB |
| 2 | 5 | Petrúcio Ferreira | Brazil | T47 | 49.76 | Q |
| 3 | 4 | Rayven Sample | United States | T45 | 50.01 | Q, PB |
| 4 | 3 | Lucas de Sousa Lima | Brazil | T46 | 50.31 | q |
| 5 | 8 | Thomas Normandeau | Canada | T47 | 50.33 | q |
| 6 | 6 | Antonis Aresti | Cyprus | T47 | 51.97 | SB |
| 7 | 7 | Alex Anjos | São Tomé and Príncipe | T47 | 54.24 | SB |

Heat 2 took place on 3 September 2021, at 10:45:

| Rank | Lane | Name | Nationality | Class | Time | Notes |
|---|---|---|---|---|---|---|
| 1 | 7 | Thomaz Ruan de Moraes | Brazil | T47 | 49.95 | Q |
| 2 | 2 | Tanner Wright | United States | T46 | 50.10 | Q, PB |
| 3 | 6 | Luis Andrés Vásquez Segura | Dominican Republic | T47 | 50.94 | Q |
| 4 | 4 | Saman Subasinghe | Sri Lanka | T47 | 51.08 | |
| 5 | 8 | Kakeru Ishida | Japan | T46 | 51.56 | |
| 6 | 5 | Thomas Borg | Malta | T47 | 55.34 | PB |
| | 3 | Wang Hao | China | T46 | DQ | WPA 17.8 |

=== Final ===
The final took place on 4 September 2021, at 21:01:

| Rank | Lane | Name | Nationality | Class | Time | Notes |
|---|---|---|---|---|---|---|
| 1st place, gold medalist(s) | 6 | Ayoub Sadni | Morocco | T47 | 47.38 | WR |
| 2nd place, silver medalist(s) | 7 | Thomaz Ruan de Moraes | Brazil | T47 | 47.87 | =AR |
| 3rd place, bronze medalist(s) | 5 | Petrúcio Ferreira | Brazil | T47 | 48.04 | SB |
| 4 | 4 | Tanner Wright | United States | T46 | 49.36 | PB |
| 5 | 9 | Luis Andrés Vásquez Segura | Dominican Republic | T47 | 49.61 | PB |
| 6 | 2 | Thomas Normandeau | Canada | T47 | 50.02 | |
| 7 | 3 | Lucas de Sousa Lima | Brazil | T46 | 50.11 | |
| | 8 | Rayven Sample | United States | T45 | DQ | WPA 18.5a |
