= Piotr Siejwa =

Polish para athlete (born 2006)

Personal information
- Nationality: Polish
- Born: 9 October 2006 (age 19)

Sport
- Sport: Para athletics
- Disability class: T72
Medal record
Men's para-athletics
Representing Poland
World Championships
Bronze medal – third place	2025 New Delhi	400 m T72

Piotr Siejwa (born 9 October 2006) is a Polish frame runner who competes in T72 sprint events.

== Career ==
On 1 September 2025, Siejwa was selected to represent Poland at the 2025 World Para Athletics Championships. He won a bronze medal in the 400 metres T72 event with a time of 1:14.40 seconds.
