= Columba Blango (Paralympian) =

British parasports runner

Personal information
- Born: 6 July 1992 (age 34) East Dulwich, London, England
- Education: University of Greenwich

Sport
- Sport: Sprinting
- Disability class: T20
- Events: 200m, 400m

Achievements and titles
- Paralympic finals: 2020
- Regional finals: 2021
Medal record
Representing Great Britain
European Championships
Gold medal – first place	2021 Bydgoszcz	400 metres T20
Paralympic Games
Bronze medal – third place	2020 Tokyo	400 metres T20

Columba Blango (born 6 July 1992) is a British parasports runner, who came third at the 400 metres T20 event at the 2020 Summer Paralympics. He won the 400 metres T20 event at the 2021 World Para Athletics European Championships, and the 200 metres T20 event at the 2021 British Grand Prix.

== Personal life ==
Blango is from East Dulwich, London. His father of the same name competed for Sierra Leone in decathlon at the 1980 Summer Olympics, and was later Mayor of Southwark. As a youngster, Blango developed blood clots on his brain. Blango studied tourism at the University of Greenwich, and as of 2021, he works in Primark. Blango is a Christian, and attends a Mustard Seed International church in Nunhead, London.

== Career ==
Blango competes in T20 classification events. He won the 200 metres T20 event at the 2021 British Grand Prix Diamond League meeting in Gateshead in a time of 23.19 seconds. At the 2021 World Para Athletics European Championships, Blango won the 400 metres T20 event in a European record time of 47.90 seconds. He had also broken the European record in the heats of the event by setting a time of 48.54 seconds.

In July 2021, Blango was selected for the 400 metres T20 event at the 2020 Summer Paralympics; it was his first Paralympic Games appearance. He finished third in the competition in a personal best time of 47.81 seconds. He was 0.1 seconds behind second-placed finisher Luis Felipe Rodriguez Bolivar, and his time was better than his father's time in the 400 metres event of the 1980 decathlon. As a result of his Paralympic medal, UK Athletics gave Blango funding for the first time in October 2021. He received the highest amount of funding available on their scheme. In 2022, Blango won the T20 400m event at the World Para Athletics Grand Prix event in Dubai.
