= José Ramírez (para-athlete) =

Colombian para athlete (born 1996)

Personal information
- Full name: José Albeiro Ramírez Estrada
- Born: 8 January 1996 (age 30)

Sport
- Country: Colombia
- Sport: Para-athletics
- Disability class: T38
Medal record
Men's para-athletics
Representing Colombia
World Championships
Silver medal – second place	2025 New Delhi	400 m T38

José Albeiro Ramírez Estrada (born 8 January 1996) is a Colombian para athlete who competes in T38 sprint events.

== Career ==
Ramírez competed at the 2025 World Para Athletics Championships and won a silver medal in the 400 metres T38 event with a personal best time 49.18 seconds.
