= Kirill Glazyrin =

Russian para athlete (born 2004)

Personal information
- Nationality: Russian
- Born: 22 January 2004 (age 22)

Sport
- Sport: Para athletics
- Disability class: T36
- Event: sprints
Medal record
Men's para-athletics
Representing Neutral Paralympic Athletes
World Championships
Gold medal – first place	2025 New Delhi	100 m T36
Silver medal – second place	2025 New Delhi	400 m T36

Kirill Glazyrin (born 22 January 2004) is a Russian para athlete who competes in T36 sprint events.

== Career ==
Glazyrin competed at the 2025 World Para Athletics Championships and won a gold medal in the 100 metres T36 event. He also won a silver medal in the 400 metres T36 event, with a European record time of 52.25 seconds, finishing seven hundredths of a second behind gold medalist James Turner.
