= Bose Mokgwathi =

Botswana Paralympic athlete (born 2002)

Personal information
- Nationality: Botswana
- Born: 24 July 2002 (age 23)

Sport
- Sport: Para-athletics
- Disability class: T13
- Event: Sprints
Medal record
Men's para-athletics
Representing Botswana
World Championships
| Bronze medal – third place | 2025 New Delhi | 400 m T13 |

Bose Mokgwathi (born 24 July 2002) is a T13 Paralympic sprint runner from Botswana. He is a medalist at the World Para Athletics Championships.

== Career ==
In December 2018, at the Region 5 Youth Games held in Gaborone, Mokgwathi won the gold medal in the 200 m T12 and 4x100 relay events and the silver medal in the 100 m T12 event. In 2019, he made his international debut in the World Para Athletics Championships held in Dubai, where in the men's 400 metres T13 event, he was eliminated in the first round.

In March 2025, Mokgwathi competed at the World Para Athletics Grand Prix 2025 in New Delhi and won the gold medal in the 100m race. Several months later, he represented his country at the 2025 World Para Athletics Championships and won a bronze medal in the 400 metres T13 event with a time of 49.66, making the only athlete in his country to win a medal at the championships.
