= João Matos Cunha =

Brazilian para athlete (born 2007)

Personal information
- Full name: João Matos Marques Cunha
- Nationality: Brazilian
- Born: 24 November 2007 (age 18)

Sport
- Sport: Para athletics
- Disability class: T72
Medal record
Men's para-athletics
Representing Brazil
World Championships
Silver medal – second place	2025 New Delhi	100 m T72
Silver medal – second place	2025 New Delhi	400 m T72

João Matos Marques Cunha (born 24 November 2007) is a Brazilian para athlete who competes in T72 sprint events.

== Career ==
In May 2025, Cunha competed at the 1st National Stage of Loterias Caixa Circuit in São Paulo, Brazil, and set an American record in the 100 meters T72 event and a Brazilian record in the 400 meters T72 event. As a result, he qualified to compete at the 2025 World Para Athletics Championships. He made his international debut for Brazil at the World Championships and won a silver medal in the 400 metres T72 event with a time of 1:07.23.
