= Thomaz Ruan de Moraes =

Brazilian Paralympic athlete

Thomaz Ruan
Personal information
- Full name: Thomaz Ruan de Moraes
- Born: 7 August 2001 (age 24) Jundiaí, São Paulo, Brazil

Sport
- Country: Brazil
- Sport: Para-athletics
Medal record
Men's para-athletics
Representing Brazil
Paralympic Games
Silver medal – second place	2020 Tokyo	400 m T47
Bronze medal – third place	2024 Paris	400 m T47
World Championships
Silver medal – second place	2019 Dubai	400 m T47
Silver medal – second place	2025 New Delhi	400 m T47

Thomaz Ruan de Moraes (born 7 August 2001) is a Brazilian Paralympic athlete. He represented Brazil at the 2020 and 2024 Summer Paralympics.

== Career ==
He won the silver medal in the men's 400 metres T47 event at the 2020 Summer Paralympics held in Tokyo, Japan.
