= Vinay Kumar Lal =

Indian paralympic athlete

Personal information
- Nationality: Indian
- Born: 22 March 1999 (age 27) Chandigarh, India

Sport
- Country: India
- Sport: Para Athletics
- Event(s): 100m, 200, 400m
Medal record
Asian Para Games
Bronze medal – third place	2018 Indonesia	400m T44
World Para Athletics Championships
Bronze medal – third place	2019 Dubai	400m T44

Vinay Kumar Lal (born 22 March 1999) is an Indian Para athlete competing in Men's 100m, 200m, 400m events in the T44 category. He is bronze medallist in Asian Para Games 2018 held in Jakarta, Indonesia. He also won bronze medal in 2019 World Para Athletics Championships held in Dubai, United Arab Emirates.

== Early life ==
Vinay Kumar Lal was born to a Punjabi Hindu family in 1999 in Chandigarh and suffered from a Left leg lower limb polio by birth. Vinay, at a very early stage, represented his state in volleyball, playing alongside able-bodied athletes. In 2015, inspired by the movie about one of India's greatest athletes, Milkha Singh, popularly known as "the Flying Sikh", Vinay started athletics. The same year, he won his first-ever national medal at the Nationals, winning two silvers in both the 200m and 400m.

== Career ==
Vinay was inspired by a film about one of India's greatest athletes, Milkha Singh, better known as the "Flying Sikh". Vinay took up athletics in 2015 and, in the same year, won both the 200m and 400m.He has been holding national record from 6 years. He won his first medals at the national level by winning two silvers. At the Nationals held at Panchkula in 2016, he won two gold and missed a third by a small margin due to a hamstring pull in the 100m, eventually settling for bronze. In 2017, Vinay won a gold and a silver in Beijing. Later that year, at the London World Championships, he finished fourth. In 2018, he won his first Asian Games medal and also won a bronze medal at the 2019 world para athletic championship. He also won a gold medal in Marrakech Para Athletics Grand 2022.
