= Anton Feoktistov =

Russian para athlete (born 2001)

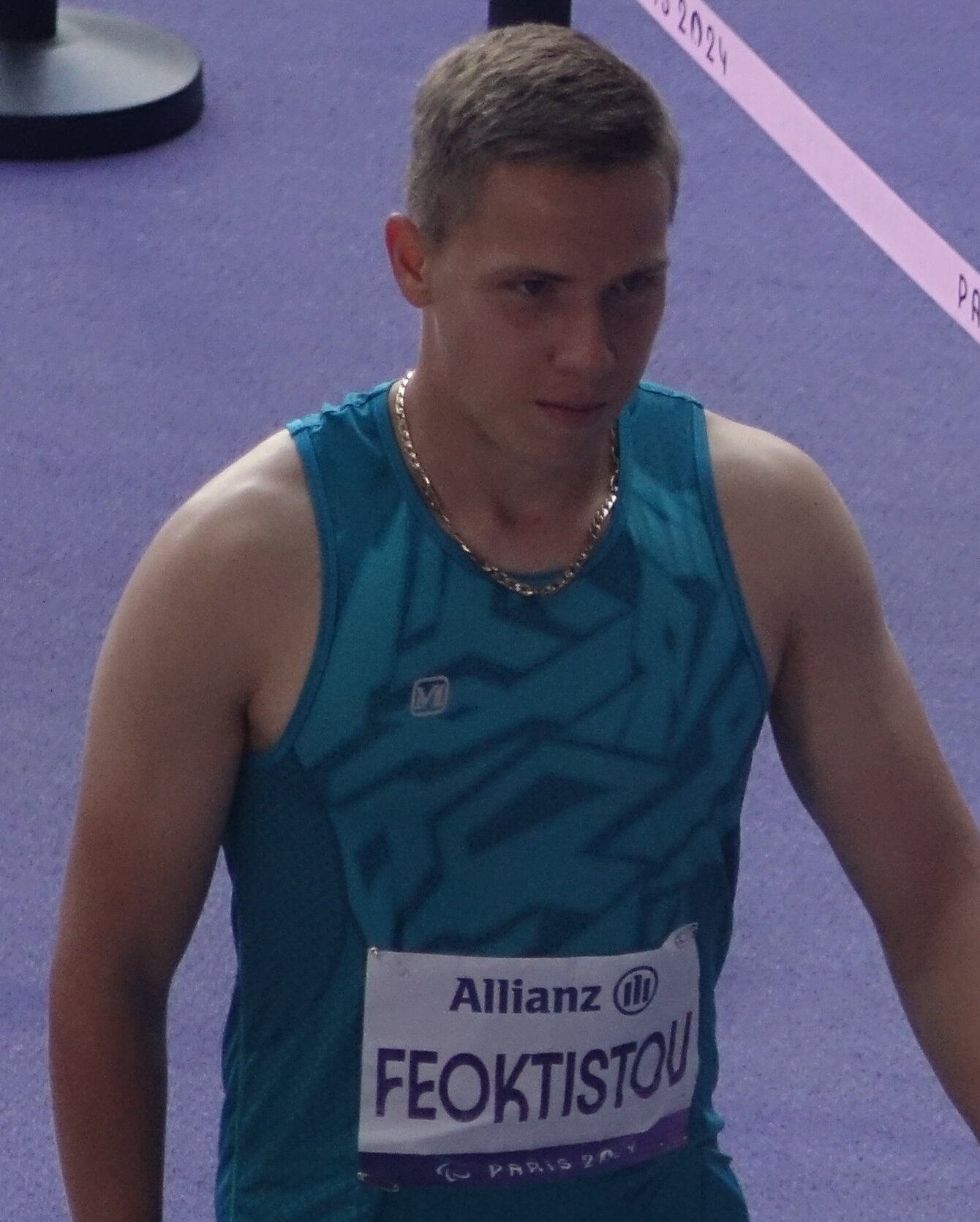
- Feoktistov at the 2024 Summer Paralympics

Personal information
- Nationality: Russian
- Born: 19 October 2001 (age 24)

Sport
- Sport: Para-athletics
- Disability class: T37
Medal record
Men's para-athletics
Representing Neutral Paralympic Athletes (NPA)
World Championships
Bronze medal – third place	2025 New Delhi	400 m T37
Representing Russia
European Championships
Gold medal – first place	2021 Bydgoszcz	400 m T38

Anton Feoktistov (born 19 October 2001) is a Russian para athlete who competes in T37 sprint events. He competed at the 2020 and 2024 Summer Paralympics.

== Career ==
He represented Russian Paralympic Committee athletes at the 2020 Summer Paralympics and placed sixth in the 400 metres T38 event with a time of 52.27. He represented Neutral Paralympic Athletes at the 2024 Summer Paralympics and placed eighth in the 400 metres T37 event with a time of 52.54 seconds.

He competed at the 2025 World Para Athletics Championships and won a silver medal in the 400 metres T37 event with a personal best time of 50.64 seconds. He also placed fourth in the 200 metres T37 event with a personal best time of 23.47 seconds.
