= Alexandros Diamantis Skourtis =

Greek para-athlete (born 2004)

Personal information
- Native name: Αλέξανδρος Διαμαντής Σκούρτης
- Nationality: Greek
- Born: 28 August 2004 (age 21)

Sport
- Sport: Para-athletics
- Disability class: T38
Medal record
Men's para-athletics
Representing Greece
World Championships
Bronze medal – third place	2025 New Delhi	400 m T38

Alexandros Diamantis Skourtis (Greek: Αλέξανδρος Διαμαντής Σκούρτης; born 28 August 2004) is a Greek para athlete who competes in T38 sprint events.

== Career ==
Skourtis made his World Para Athletics Championships debut in 2025. During the heats of the 400 metre T38 event, he set a European record with a time of 49.97 seconds to advance to the finals During the final he set a new European record with a time of 49.74 seconds, and won a bronze medal.
