= Damián Carcelén =

Ecuadorian Paralympic athlete

Damian Carcelén
Personal information
- Born: 3 August 1998 (age 27)

Sport
- Country: Ecuador
- Sport: Paralympic athletics
- Disability class: T20
Medal record
Paralympic athletics
Representing Ecuador
Parapan American Games
Silver medal – second place	2019 Lima	Long jump T20
World Championships
Silver medal – second place	2017 London	400m T20

Damián Josue Carcelén Delgado (born 3 August 1998) is an Ecuadorian Paralympic athlete who competes in long jump and sprinting events at international track and field competitions. He is a Parapan American Games silver medalist and a World silver medalist.
