= Daniel Martins (athlete) =

Brazilian Paralympic athlete (born 1996)

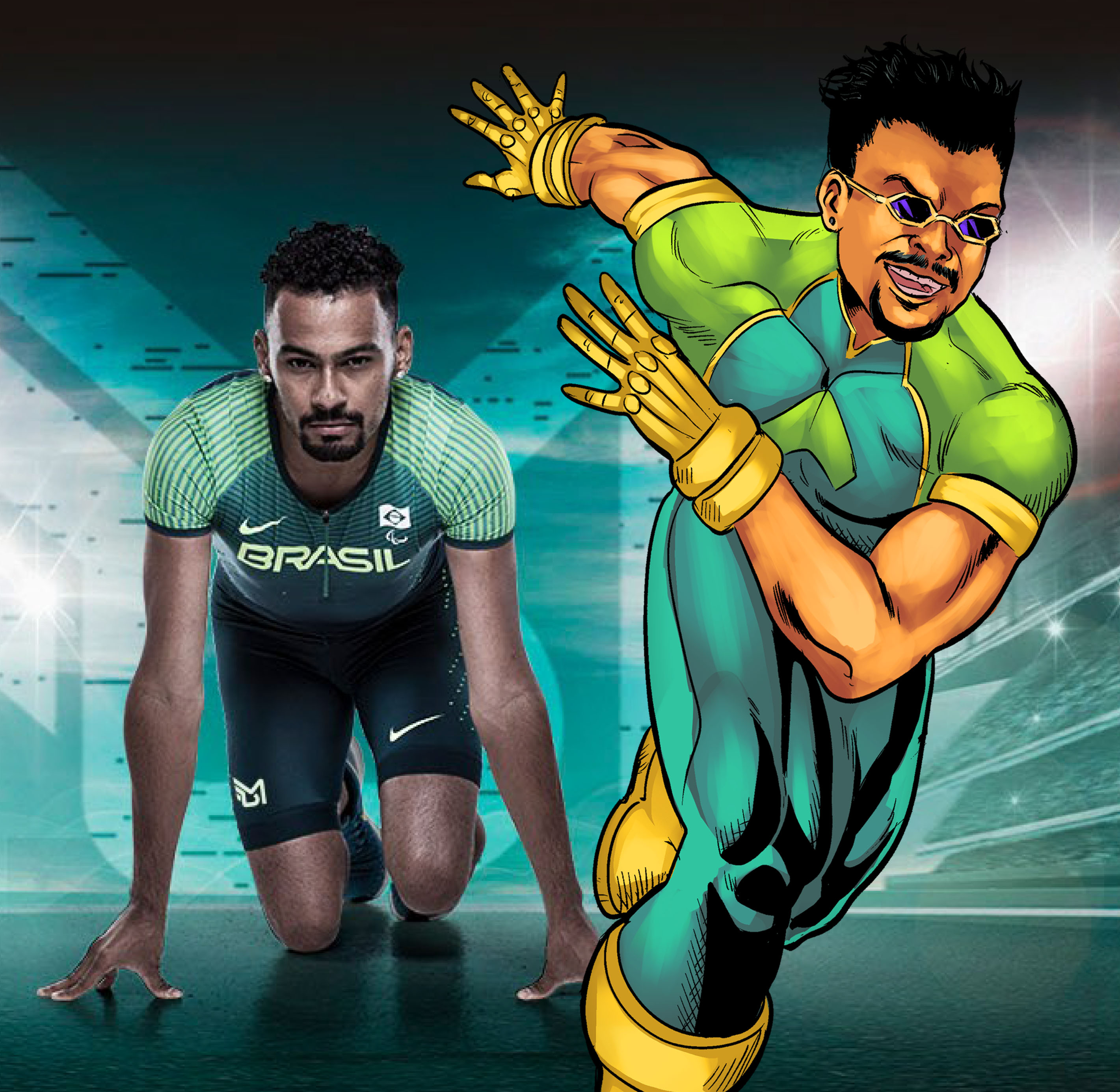

Personal information
- Full name: Daniel Tavares Martins
- Born: 12 March 1996 (age 30) Marília, Brazil
- Height: 1.71 m (5 ft 7 in)

Sport
- Country: Brazil
- Sport: Para-athletics
- Disability class: T20
Medal record
Men's para-athletics
Representing Brazil
Paralympic Games
Gold medal – first place	2016 Rio de Janeiro	400m T20
World Championships
Gold medal – first place	2015 Doha	400m T20
Gold medal – first place	2017 London	400m T20
Gold medal – first place	2019 Dubai	400m T20
Silver medal – second place	2023 Paris	400m T20
Silver medal – second place	2025 New Delhi	400m T20
Parapan American Games
Gold medal – first place	2019 Lima	400m T20

Daniel Tavares Martins (Note: This name uses Portuguese naming customs: the first or maternal family name is Tavares and the second or paternal family name is Martins.) (born 12 March 1996) is a Brazilian Paralympic athlete who competes in sprinting events at international elite events.

== Career ==
He represented Brazil at the 2016 Summer Paralympics and won a gold medal in the 400 metres T20 event. He is also a three-time gold medal winner at the World Para Athletics Championships, and a Parapan American Games champion in the 400 metres T20. He was the first Brazilian Paralympic athlete to do so in the T20 classification.

After winning his gold medal at the 2016 Summer Paralympics, a school in Ricardo de Albuquerque in the northern part of Rio de Janeiro was named in honour of him.
