= Maxime Carabin =

Belgian wheelchair athlete

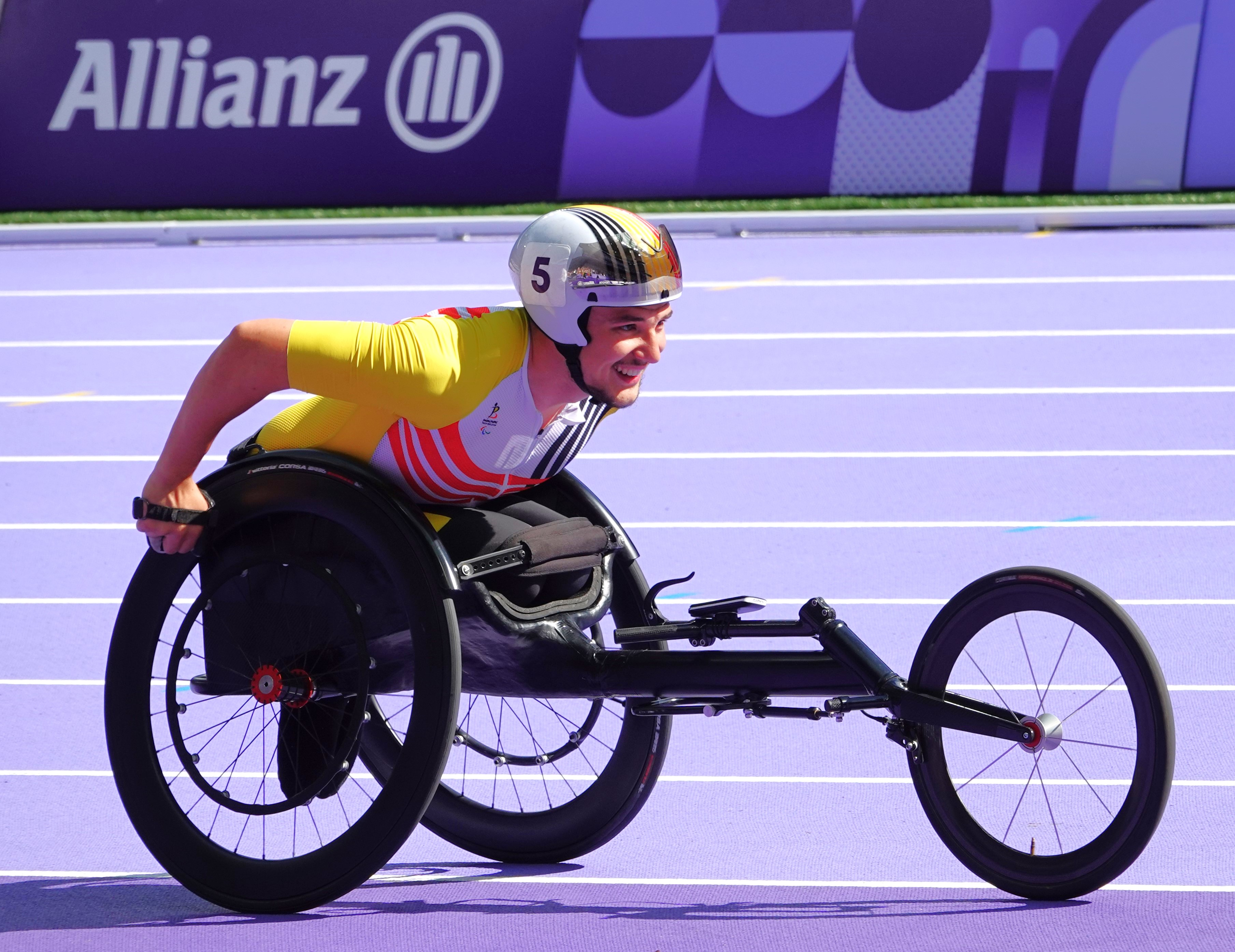
- Carabin at 2024 Summer Paralympics

Personal information
- Nationality: Belgian
- Born: 18 September 2000 (age 26) Liège, Belgium

Sport
- Sport: Paralympic athletics
- Disability class: T52
- Event: Sprints
- Club: RFC Liège
- Coached by: Claude Issorat
Medal record
Men's para-athletics
Representing Belgium
Paralympic Games
Gold medal – first place	2024 Paris	100 m T52
Gold medal – first place	2024 Paris	400 m T52
World Championships
Gold medal – first place	2023 Paris	100m – T52
Gold medal – first place	2023 Paris	400m – T52
Gold medal – first place	2024 Kobe	100m – T52
Gold medal – first place	2024 Kobe	400m – T52
Gold medal – first place	2024 Kobe	1500m – T52

Maxime Carabin (born 18 September 2000) is a Belgian wheelchair racer and para athlete from Liège. He is current Paralympic champion in the 100 metres and 400 metres in the T52 racing division and is also five-time world champion and world record holder in the men's 100, 200 and 400 metres sprint.

== Personal history ==
Carabin was born in the city of Liège in 2000, and while playing a handball match in November 2019, suffered a freak accident, resulting in the loss of function of both his legs and hands. After attempting and rejecting hand-bike racing (too complicated) and para-swimming (too solitary), he took up wheelchair para-athletics and set his focus on the 2024 Paralympics in Paris, France. Together with his entourage, in July 2023, he set up the non-profit "Wheeler Forever" with the stated goal of promoting and facilitating access to wheelchair para-athletics.

== Athletics career ==
After being classified as a T52 athlete, Carabin appeared at his first major international competition when he represented Belgium at the 2023 World Para Athletics Championships in Paris, France where he won the gold medal in both 100 and 400 metres sprints.

The following year at the 2024 World Para Athletics Championships in Kobe, Japan, Carabin went one better with a hat-trick of golds, doing a repeat in the 100 and 400 metres, adding a third by also winning the 1500 metres setting championship records in all three events.

Carabin went on to take gold in both the men's 100 metres and 400 metres at the Paralympic Games in Paris.

Carabin broke Tomoki Sato's Paralympic record of 55.39 to win his 400 metres semi-final in a time of 54.48, before clocking 55.10 seconds to take gold ahead of outgoing champion Sato in second, and fellow Japanese racer Tomoya Ito in third.

A week later, Carabin won his 100 metres semi-final in 16.21 seconds, bettering Raymond Martin's Paralympic record from 2012 of 16.79, claiming his second title of the week by winning the final in 16.70 seconds, ahead of Britain's Marcus Perrineau-Daley and Sato.

== Awards ==
Belgian Paralympic Athlete of the Year (2023)
