= Akira Banothu =

Indian para-athlete (born 2007)

Banothu Akira Nandan
Personal information
- Born: 23 June 2007 (age 19)

Sport
- Country: India
- Sport: Para athletics
- Event: 400m T38
Medal record
Men's para athletics
Representing India
Asian Para Games
Silver medal – second place	2026 Aichi-Nagoya	400m T38
Asian Youth Para Games
Gold medal – first place	2025 Dubai	200 m T35-38

Banothu Akira Nandan (born 23 June 2007) is an Indian para athlete from Telangana who competes in men's 400 m T35/38 races. He represented India at the 2026 Asian Para Games at Aichi Nagoya, Japan, and won a silver medal in the 400 metre run in the T38 class.

== Career ==
Akira won a silver medal in the 400m T38 class at the 2026 Asian Para Games. He finished behind Iraq's Mohammed Khalaf who won the gold medal in the combined category.

In October 2025, he represented India at the 2025 World Para Athletics Championships in New Delhi. He qualified fifth for the finals of the 400m run T38 class and finished seventh.
