= Mohammed Ayade =

Iraqi para athlete (born 1999)

Personal information
- Nationality: Iraqi
- Born: 15 June 1999 (age 27)

Sport
- Sport: Para athletics
- Disability class: T11
- Event: 400 metres
Medal record
Men's para-athletics
Representing Iraq
World Championships
Bronze medal – third place	2025 New Delhi	400 m T11
Asian Para Games
Silver medal – second place	2022 Hangzhou	400 m T11
Asian Para Games
Gold medal – first place	2026 Aichi-Nagoya	100 m T11
Silver medal – second place	2026 Aichi-Nagoya	400 m T11

Mohammed Ayade (born 15 June 1999) is an Iraqi para athlete who competes in T11 sprint events. He represented Iraq at the 2024 Summer Paralympics.

== Career ==
He represented Iraq at the 2024 Summer Paralympics and finished in fourth place in the 400 metres T11 event with an area record time of 51.25 seconds. He competed at the 2025 World Para Athletics Championships and won a bronze medal in the 400 metres T11. He won a gold at the 2026 Para Asian Games in the 100 metres T11 and a silver in the 400 metres T11.
