= Rodrigue Massianga =

French Paralympic athlete

Personal information
- Born: 2 May 1991 (age 35) Paris, France

Sport
- Country: France
- Sport: Paralympic athletics
- Disability: Autism
- Disability class: T20
- Event: 400 metres
Medal record
Paralympic athletics
Representing France
European Championships
| Gold medal – first place | 2016 Grosseto | 400m T20 |

Rodrigue Massianga (born 2 May 1991) is a French Paralympic athlete who competes in the 400 metres at international elite competitions. He is a European champion in this event.
