= Kyriakos Skourtis =

Kyriakos Skourtis (Greek: Κυριάκος Σκούρτης) was a captain from Hydra Island, who participated in the Greek Revolution of 1821. He is known mainly for his appointment as commander of the land forces by the government of Georgios Kountouriotis in 1825, although he was a naval officer and completely inexperienced at land.

== Biography ==
During the pre-revolutionary period, Skourtis served in the Ottoman navy. When the revolution broke out, he joined it and took an active part in naval operations. During the Greek civil wars of 1824–25 he joined the government forces of Georgios Kountouriotis. In fact, in May 1824, together with Hatzichristos Voulgaris, he defeated the anti-government forces of Nikitaras, Dimitrios Plapoutas, Dimitrios Tsokris and Panos Kolokotronis in the battles of Dalamanara (May 8) and Myli (May 12).

In 1825, when the forces of Ibrahim Pasha disembarked in the Peloponnese, Skourtis, being favored by Kountouriotis, was appointed commander of the land forces by the government, despite the fact that he was a sailor. That caused great discontent and insubordination even among the ranks of pro-government chieftains. The battle that followed in Kremmydi on 7 April 1825 proved to be catastrophic for the Greek forces. Skourtis' lack of knowledge regarding land warfare and the bad disposition of the troops, combined with the superior tactics of the Egyptian forces, led the Greeks to a defeat with 500 dead.

The defeat of the rebels angered the other chieftains who took part in the conflict, as Skourtis was held chiefly responsible for the outcome. As a result, he was replaced by Theodoros Kolokotronis, who had been imprisoned at the time for being anti-government. After the end of the revolution and the creation of the Greek state, Skourtis was granted farmlands in Damala, Argolida.
