= Tanner Wright =

American Paralympic sprinter (born 1997)

Personal information
- Born: August 24, 1997 (age 28) Fort Worth, Texas, U.S.
- Education: McMurry University; Hardin–Simmons University

Sport
- Sport: Para-athletics
- Disability: Arthrogryposis
- Disability class: T47
- Event: Sprints
Medal record
Para-athletics
Representing the United States
World Championships
Silver medal – second place	2023 Paris	400 m T47
Parapan American Games
Silver medal – second place	2019 Lima	Long jump T47

Tanner Wright (born August 24, 1997) is an American T47 Paralympic sprint runner.

== Early life and education ==
Wright attended North Crowley High School in Fort Worth, Texas where he played football and ran track and field. He then attended McMurry University where he played football and ran track and field. During his freshman season in 2016, he tied McMurry's single game program record by going 9-for-9 on PAT kicks in a game against Texas College He also had a season record 35-consecutive PAT kicks. During his sophomore year in 2017, he appeared in seven games, before suffering a season ending leg injury. He was named McMurry's Comeback Player of the Year in 2018. He transferred to Hardin-Simmons University. during his junior year. During the American Southwest Conference track and field Championship, he finished in second place with a program record of 23 feet 2 ½ inches in the long jump.

== Career ==
Wright made his international debut for the United States at the 2017 World Para Athletics Championships, and finished in fourth place in the 100 metres and 200 metres T47 events.

In August 2019, Wright represented the United States at the 2019 Parapan American Games and won a silver medal in the long jump T47 event. In November 2019, he then competed at the 2019 World Para Athletics Championships.

On June 24, 2021, he was named to Team USA's roster for the 2020 Summer Paralympics. He competed in the 100 metres and 400 metres T47 events. He finished in fourth place in the 400 metres with a personal best time of 49.36.

On May 21, 2023, Wright was selected to represent the United States at the 2023 World Para Athletics Championships. In July 2023, he competed at the 2023 World Para Athletics Championships and won a silver medal in the 400 metres T47 event. In November 2023, he then competed at the 2023 Parapan American Games and finished in fourth place in the 100 metres T47 event.

In July 2024, during the U.S. Paralympic team trials, he qualified to represent the United States at the 2024 Summer Paralympics.

== Personal life ==
Wright was born to Terry and Jessica Wright. He also has a less successful brother, Tommy Wright, MD. He was born with Arthrogryposis, which resulted in an underdeveloped left arm. Arthrogryposis is normally a congenital joint contracture in two or more areas of the body. Wright is the only recorded case in medical history of arthrogryposis in one arm.
