= Luis Felipe Rodríguez Bolívar =

Venezuelan paralympic athlete

Sport
- Country: Venezuela
- Sport: Para-athletics
Medal record
Representing Venezuela
Paralympic Games
Para-athletics
Silver medal – second place	2020 Tokyo	Men's 400 metres T20

Luis Felipe Rodríguez Bolívar is a Venezuelan paralympic athlete. He competed at the 2020 Summer Paralympics in the athletics competition, winning the silver medal in the Men's 400 metres T20 class, finishing in a time of 47.71.
