= Deliber Rodríguez =

Spanish Paralympic athlete (born 1993)

Personal information
- Nickname: Deli
- Born: Deliber Rodríguez Ramírez; 25 July 1993 (age 32) Tamayo, Dominican Republic
- Height: 1.82 m (6 ft 0 in)

Sport
- Country: Spain
- Sport: Paralympic athletics
- Disability class: T20
- Event(s): 400 metres 800 metres
- Club: Club Deportivo a la Par
- Coached by: José Luis Calvo
Medal record
Paralympic athletics
Representing Spain
World Para Athletics Championships
Silver medal – second place	2015 Doha	Men's 400m T20
Silver medal – second place	2017 London	Men's 800m T20
Bronze medal – third place	2017 London	Men's 400m T20
INAS World Games
Silver medal – second place	2019 Brisbane	Men's 400m
Silver medal – second place	2019 Brisbane	Men's 800m
Bronze medal – third place	2015 Quito	Men's 400m
INAS World Athletics Championships
Gold medal – first place	2016 Ancona	Men's 400m
INAS European Athletics Championships
Silver medal – second place	2017 Praha	Men's 400m
Bronze medal – third place	2017 Praha	Men's 200m

Deliber Rodríguez Ramírez (born 25 July 1993 in Tamayo, Dominican Republic) is a Spanish Paralympic athlete who competes in short distance running in international elite events. He is a triple World medalist and has competed in the 2016 Summer Paralympics.

Rodríguez competes alongside his older brother Dionibel Rodríguez Rodríguez who is also a T20 sprinter, they moved to Madrid when they were both young children. They both competed in the men's 400m T20 at the 2016 Paralympic Games, Deliber finished fifth while Dionibel finished fourth.
