= Riccardo Bagaini =

Italian Paralympic athlete (born 2000)

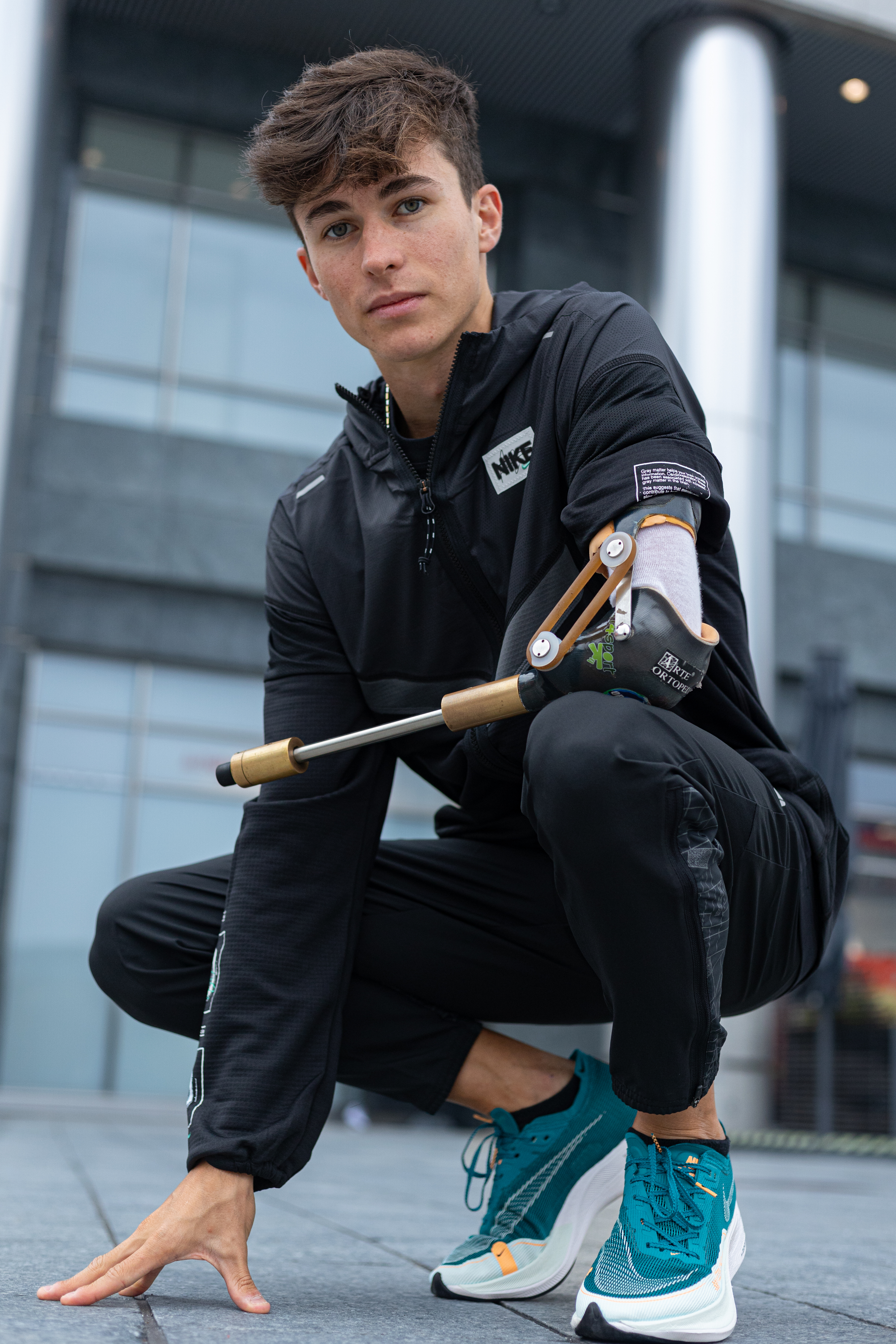
- Riccardo Bagaini

Personal information
- Nickname: Ricky
- Born: 12 October 2000 (age 25) Sorengo, Switzerland

Sport
- Country: Italy
- Sport: Paralympic athletics
- Disability: Limb deficiency
- Disability class: T47
- Club: Sempione 82
Medal record
Paralympic athletics
Representing Italy
World Championships
| Silver medal – second place | 2017 London | 4x100m relay T42-47 |
European Championships
| Silver medal – second place | 2018 Berlin | 4x100m relay T42-47/61-64 |
| Bronze medal – third place | 2018 Berlin | 200m T47 |
| Bronze medal – third place | 2018 Berlin | Universal relay |
| Bronze medal – third place | 2021 Bydgoszcz | 400m T47 |

Riccardo Bagaini (born 12 October 2000) is an Italian Paralympic athlete who competes in sprinting events in international elite competitions.

== Career ==
He is a World silver medalist and a four-time European medalist. He was born without his left forearm due to amniotic band syndrome.
