= Dionibel Rodríguez =

Spanish Paralympic athlete

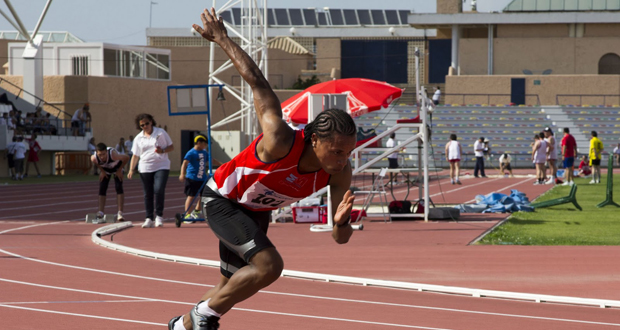

Personal information
- Nationality: Spanish
- Born: Dionibel Rodríguez Rodríguez; 4 April 1991 (age 35)

Sport
- Country: Spain
- Sport: Track and field (T20)

Dionibel Rodríguez Rodríguez (born 4 April 1991) is a track and field athlete from Spain, who competes under the T20 classification due to an intellectual disability. He represents several athletic teams and is supported by the Carmen Pardo Valcarce Foundation. He has competed at the INAS World Games, INAS World Athletics Championships and the INAS World Indoor Athletics Championships.

== Personal ==
Rodríguez was born on 4 April 1991 and is from Madrid. Other sports he has played include football and basketball. He has received training in being an electrician.

== Athletics ==
Rodríguez is a T20 athlete from Spain who represents the Madrid sports federation in national competitions. The T20 classification is for athletes with an intellectual disability. Rodriguez is a member of the athletic club, AD Maratón de Madrid. He also is a member of the Madrid Federation of Intellectual Disability Sports, and Club Sports Medicine Infant Jesus of Carmen Pardo-Valcarce Foundation. Since 2004, when he was 13 years old, he has been supported by the Carmen Pardo Valcarce Foundation, which allows him to compete in sport at the highest level. This support meant he could use some of the same training materials used by Rafa Nadal, a Spanish tennis player.

In 2006, as a 15-year-old, Rodríguez was one of the top performers at the Madrid Regional Outdoor Athletics Championship. He participated in the Shanghai, China hosted 2007 World Games. He competed at the 2008 INAS World Indoor Athletics Championships held in Tallinn, Estonia, winning a silver in the 200 meters and bronze in 4x400 meter relay.

Rodríguez competed in 2010 INAS European Athletics Championship and picked up a pair of gold medals in the 200 meter and 400 meter events. He competed in the 2011 INAS World Games, winning a pair of silver medals in the 400 meters and the 4x100 meter relay. In 2012, he was a recipient of a Plan ADO €2,500 coaching scholarship. In 2012, he competed at the INAS World Indoor Athletics Championship, earning a gold medal in the 200 meter event, a bronze in the 4 × 400 m relay event and finished fourth in the long jump. He competed in the 2013 INAS World Athletics Championships hosted by the Czech Republic. He picked up two gold medals at the event, one in the 200 meters and one in the 400 meters. In July 2013, he participated in the 2013 IPC Athletics World Championships.
