= Daniel du Plessis =

South African para-athlete

Personal information
- Born: 4 November 1993 (age 31) Pretoria, South Africa

Sport
- Sport: Paralympic athletics

Daniel du Plessis (born 4 November 1993) is a South African para-athlete from Pretoria, Gauteng where he competes for the IS Ability Sports Club. He is the current African record holder over 400m at 52.41 seconds in the T62 class.

Du Plessis has limb deficiency in both legs due to fibular hemimelia which resulted in both legs being amputated below the knee. He uses prosthetic running blades. He is due to make his Paralympic debut at the 2020 Summer Paralympics in Tokyo, Japan.

Du Plessis has a degree in actuarial science from Stellenbosch University and works in the financial sector.
