= Charles-Antoine Kouakou =

French Paralympic athlete (born 1998)

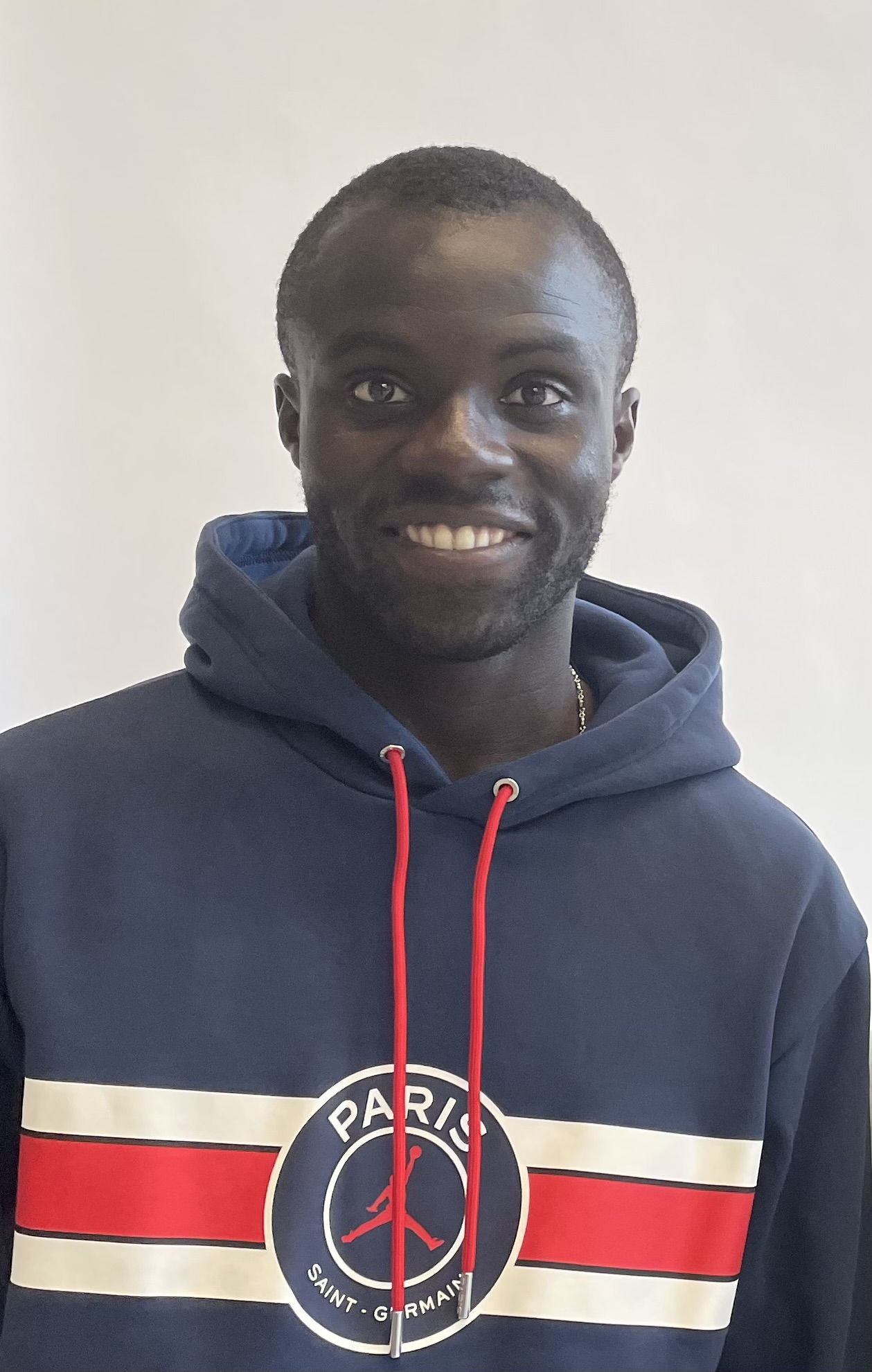

Personal information
- Born: 14 July 1998 (age 27) Paris, France

Sport
- Country: France
- Sport: Paralympic athletics
- Disability class: T20
Medal record
Paralympic athletics
Representing France
Paralympic Games
Gold medal – first place	2020 Tokyo	400m T20
European Championships
Silver medal – second place	2021 Bydgoszcz	400m T20

Charles-Antoine Kouakou (born 14 July 1998) is a Paralympic athlete from France. He competed at the Tokyo Paralympic Games in athletics, 400 m - T20 (for athletes with intellectual impairment). He won the gold medal for the 400m - T2 on 31 August 2021.

He previously competed in the INAS Summer Games in 2018.

He is chevalier of the Legion of Honour He was one of the five French Paralympians who lit the cauldron of the 2024 Summer Paralympics in Paris.
