= Namibia at the Paralympics =

- IPC code: NAM
- NPC: Namibia National Paralympic Committee
- Medals: Gold 3 Silver 4 Bronze 5 Total 12

Summer appearances
- 1992; 1996–2000; 2004; 2008; 2012; 2016; 2020; 2024

Namibia made its Paralympic Games debut at the 1992 Summer Paralympics in Barcelona. These were the first Summer Paralympics to be held since the country's accession to independence from South Africa in 1990, and thus the first Games in which Namibia was able to take part. For its inaugural participation, the country sent just two athletes, both women, who both competed in discus, javelin and shot put. They did not win any medals.

Namibia was then absent from the Paralympics until 2004, when it entered a single representative in men's powerlifting. It returned in 2008, with a single competitor, Reginald Benade, in men's discus and shot put. Benade won Namibia's first Paralympic medal: a bronze in the discus.

Namibia achieved its first Paralympic gold medal in the 2012 London Summer Paralympics. Johanna Benson, at the time Namibia's only female athlete, won the 200 meter race in her division.

Namibia competed in the 2016 Rio Paralympics, earning two silver and two gold medals in athletics categories.

Namibia medalled twice in each of the 2020 and 2024 games

Namibia has never taken part in the Winter Paralympics.

== Medallists ==
Medal	Name	Games	Sport	Event
Bronze	Reginald Benade	2008 Beijing	Athletics	Men's discus throw F35-36
Gold	Johanna Benson	2012 London	Athletics	Women's 200m T37
Silver	Johanna Benson	2012 London	Athletics	Women's 100m T37
Gold	Ananias Shikongo	2016 Rio de Janeiro	Athletics	Men's 200m T11
Silver	Johannes Nambala	2016 Rio de Janeiro	Athletics	Men's 100m T13
Silver	Johannes Nambala	2016 Rio de Janeiro	Athletics	Men's 400m T13
Bronze	Ananias Shikongo	2016 Rio de Janeiro	Athletics	Men's 100m T11
Bronze	Ananias Shikongo	2016 Rio de Janeiro	Athletics	Men's 400m T11
Silver	Ananias Shikongo	2020 Tokyo	Athletics	Men's 400m T11
Bronze	Johannes Nambala	2020 Tokyo	Athletics	Men's 400m T13
Gold	Lahja Ishitile	2024 Paris	Athletics	Men's 400m T11
Bronze	Lahja Ishitile	2024 Paris	Athletics	Men's 200m T11

== See also ==
- Namibia at the Olympics
