= Athletics at the 2024 Summer Paralympics – Men's 100 metres T11 =

Men's 100 metres T11 at the XVII Paralympic Games
- Venue: Stade de France
- Dates: 4 September 2024 (heats & semi-finals); 5 September 2024 (final)
- Competitors: 17 from 12 nations
- Winning time: 11.02

Medalists
| 1st place, gold medalist(s) | | Athanasios Ghavelas; Guide: Ioannis Nyfantopoulos | Greece |
| 2nd place, silver medalist(s) | | Timothée Adolphe; Guide: Charles Renard | France |
| 3rd place, bronze medalist(s) | | Di Dongdong; Guide: Lian Jiageng | China |

100 metres at the 2024 Summer Paralympics
Men · T11 · T12 · T13 · T34 · T35 · T36 · T37 · T38 · T44 · T47 · T51 · T52 · T53 · T54 · T63 · T64
Women · T11 · T12 · T13 · T34 · T35 · T36 · T37 · T38 · T47 · T53 · T54 · T63 · T64

The men's 100 metres T11 event at the 2024 Summer Paralympics in Paris, took place on 4 and 5 September 2024.

The T11 category is for athletes with a visual impairment. A T11 athlete may be entirely without sight, or be able to perceive light, but have no ability to see the shape of a hand at any distance. T11 athletes commonly run with guides.

== Records ==
Prior to the competition, the existing records were as follows:

| World Record | Athanasios Ghavelas (GRE) | 10.82 | (Japan) Tokyo | 2 September 2021 |
| Paralympic Record | Athanasios Ghavelas (GRE) | 10.82 | (Japan) Tokyo | 2 September 2021 |

| Area | Time | | Athlete | Location | Date |
|---|---|---|---|---|---|
| Africa | 11.11 | | (Namibia) Ananias Shikongo | (France) Paris | 15 July 2023 |
| America | 10.92 | | (United States) David Brown | (United States) California | 18 April 2014 |
| Asia | 11.03 | | (China) Di Dongdong | (Japan) Tokyo | 2 September 2021 |
| Europe | 10.82 | WR | (Greece) Athanasios Ghavelas | (Japan) Tokyo | 2 September 2021 |
| Oceania | Vacant | | | | |

== Results ==
=== Round 1 ===
First in each heat (Q) and the next 7 fastest (q) advance to the semi-finals.

==== Heat 1 ====
| Rank | Lane | Athlete | Nation | Time | Notes |
|---|---|---|---|---|---|
| 1 | 7 | Timothée Adolphe; Guide: Charles Renard | France | 11.19 | Q |
| 2 | 5 | Ye Tao; Guide: Tian Haoyu | China | 11.56 | q |
| 3 | 3 | Daniel Silva; Guide: Wendel Silva | Brazil | 11.73 | SB |
| Source: | | | | Wind: -0.4 m/s | |

==== Heat 2 ====
| Rank | Lane | Athlete | Nation | Time | Notes |
|---|---|---|---|---|---|
| 1 | 5 | Athanasios Ghavelas; Guide: Ioannis Nyfantopoulos | Greece | 11.16 | Q |
| 2 | 7 | Guillaume Atangana; Guide: Israel Harrison | Refugee Paralympic Team | 11.40 | q, PB |
| 3 | 3 | Chris Kinda; Guide: Riwaldo Goagoseb | Namibia | 11.57 | |
| Source: | | | | Wind: -0.1 m/s | |

==== Heat 3 ====
| Rank | Lane | Athlete | Nation | Time | Notes |
|---|---|---|---|---|---|
| 1 | 5 | Di Dongdong; Guide: Lian Jiageng | China | 11.24 | Q |
| 2 | 3 | Eduardo Uceda; Guide: Diego Folgado | Spain | 11.37 | q, PB |
| 3 | 7 | Gauthier Makunda; Guide: Joachim Berland | France | 12.06 | |
| Source: | | | | Wind: +0.3 m/s | |

==== Heat 4 ====
| Rank | Lane | Athlete | Nation | Time | Notes |
|---|---|---|---|---|---|
| 1 | 7 | Enderson Santos; Guide: Eubrig Maza | Venezuela | 11.32 | Q |
| 2 | 3 | Marcel Böttger; Guide: Alexander Kosenkow | Germany | 11.34 | q |
| 3 | 5 | Joan Munar; Guide: Guillermo Rojo | Spain | 11.61 | q, PB |
| 4 | 1 | Grâce Mouambako; Guide: Sharon Loussanga | Republic of the Congo | 12.07 | |
| Source: | | | | Wind: +0.4 m/s | |

==== Heat 5 ====
| Rank | Lane | Athlete | Nation | Time | Notes |
|---|---|---|---|---|---|
| 1 | 5 | Ananias Shikongo; Guide: Even Tjiviju | Namibia | 11.39 | Q |
| 2 | 7 | Urganchbek Egamnazarov; Guide: Sardor Bakhtiyorov | Uzbekistan | 11.68 | q, PB |
| 3 | 1 | Felipe Gomes; Guide: Jonas Silva | Brazil | 11.69 | |
| 4 | 3 | Mama Bari; Guide: Klisman Semedo | Guinea-Bissau | 12.69 | SB |
| Source: | | | | Wind: -0.1 m/s | |

=== Semi-finals ===
First in each heat (Q) and the next 1 fastest (q) advance to the final.

==== Heat 1 ====
| Rank | Lane | Athlete | Nation | Time | Notes |
|---|---|---|---|---|---|
| 1 | 3 | Athanasios Ghavelas; Guide: Ioannis Nyfantopoulos | Greece | 11.08 | Q, SB |
| 2 | 7 | Eduardo Uceda; Guide: Diego Folgado | Spain | 11.34 | SB |
| 3 | 5 | Marcel Böttger; Guide: Alexander Kosenkow | Germany | 11.36 | |
| 4 | 1 | Urganchbek Egamnazarov; Guide: Sardor Bakhtiyorov | Uzbekistan | 11.75 | |
| Source: | | | | Wind: +0.3 m/s | |

==== Heat 2 ====
| Rank | Lane | Athlete | Nation | Time | Notes |
|---|---|---|---|---|---|
| 1 | 3 | Timothée Adolphe; Guide: Charles Renard | France | 11.11 | Q |
| 2 | 5 | Ananias Shikongo; Guide: Even Tjiviju | Namibia | 11.18 | q, SB |
| 3 | 7 | Ye Tao; Guide: Tian Haoyu | China | 11.50 | |
| 4 | 1 | Joan Munar; Guide: Guillermo Rojo | Spain | 11.61 | =PB |
| Source: | | | | Wind: +0.1 m/s | |

==== Heat 3 ====
| Rank | Lane | Athlete | Nation | Time | Notes |
|---|---|---|---|---|---|
| 1 | 3 | Di Dongdong; Guide: Lian Jiageng | China | 11.13 | Q, SB |
| 2 | 5 | Enderson Santos; Guide: Eubrig Maza | Venezuela | 11.27 | =PB |
| 3 | 7 | Guillaume Atangana; Guide: Israel Harrison | Refugee Paralympic Team | 11.49 | |
| 4 | 1 | Chris Kinda; Guide: Riwaldo Goagoseb | Namibia | 11.60 | |
| Source: | | | | Wind: +0.2 m/s | |

=== Final ===
| Rank | Lane | Athlete | Nation | Time | Notes |
|---|---|---|---|---|---|
| 1st place, gold medalist(s) | 5 | Athanasios Ghavelas; Guide: Ioannis Nyfantopoulos | Greece | 11.02 | SB |
| 2nd place, silver medalist(s) | 3 | Timothée Adolphe; Guide: Charles Renard | France | 11.05 | =SB |
| 3rd place, bronze medalist(s) | 7 | Di Dongdong; Guide: Lian Jiageng | China | 11.08 | SB |
| 4 | 1 | Ananias Shikongo; Guide: Even Tjiviju | Namibia | 11.17 | SB |
| Source: | | | | Wind: +0.3 m/s | |
