= Sport in Namibia =

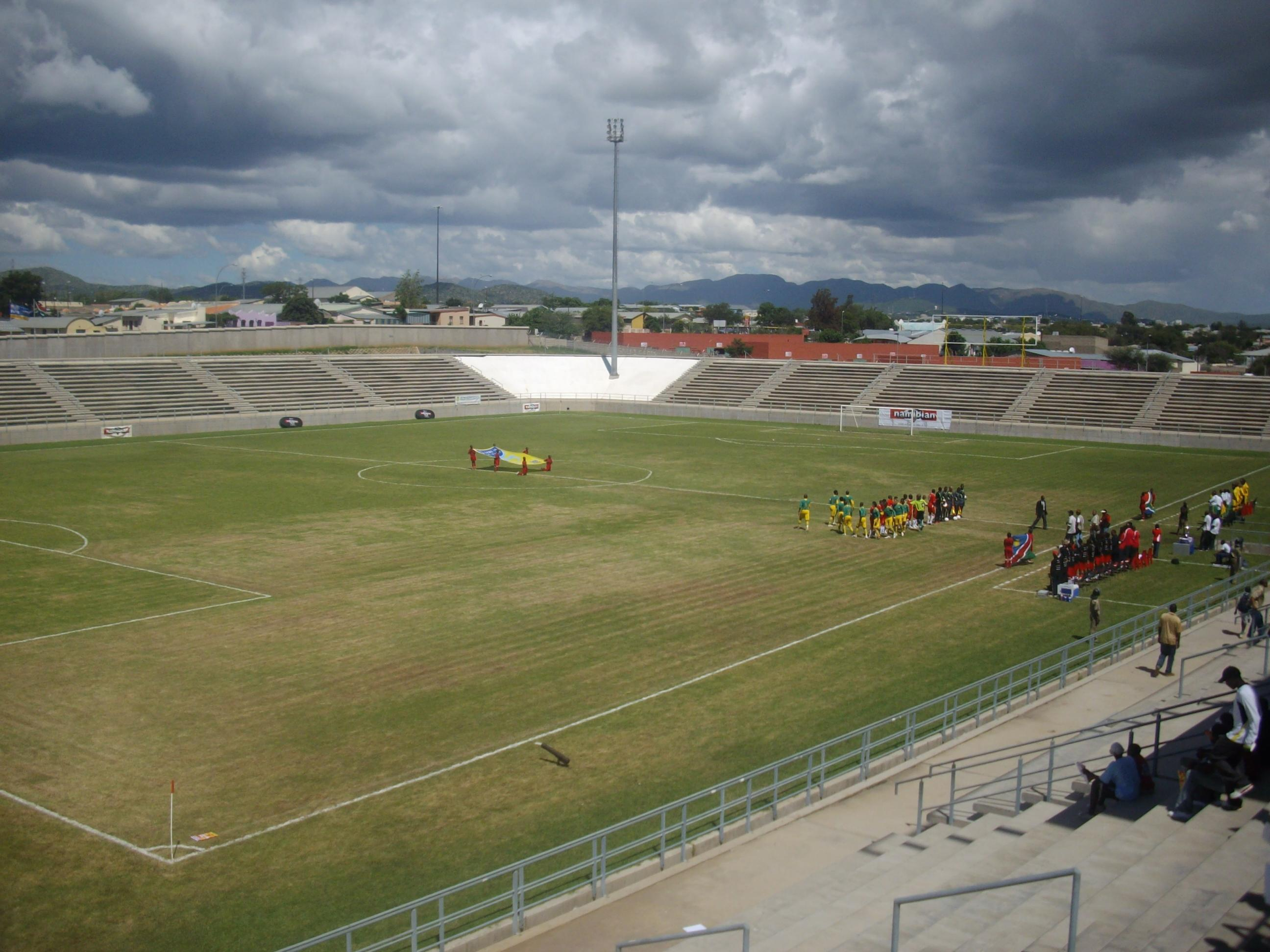
View of Sam Nujoma Stadium before a Namibia and South Africa U-20 game in March 2008

The principal sports in Namibia are football, rugby union, cricket, golf and fishing. Boxing and athletics are also popular. The home stadium for all national teams is Independence Stadium in Windhoek, while Sam Nujoma Stadium in Katutura is also occasionally used.

== Football ==
Football in Namibia is governed by the Namibia Football Association. The Namibia Premier League is the main domestic league. The Namibia national football team has never qualified for the FIFA World Cup, but won the COSAFA Cup in 2015 and has twice been runners- up in the competition. It has qualified for four African Cups of Nations, in 1998, 2008, 2019 and 2023, advancing beyond the group stage for the first time in 2023.

== Rugby union ==
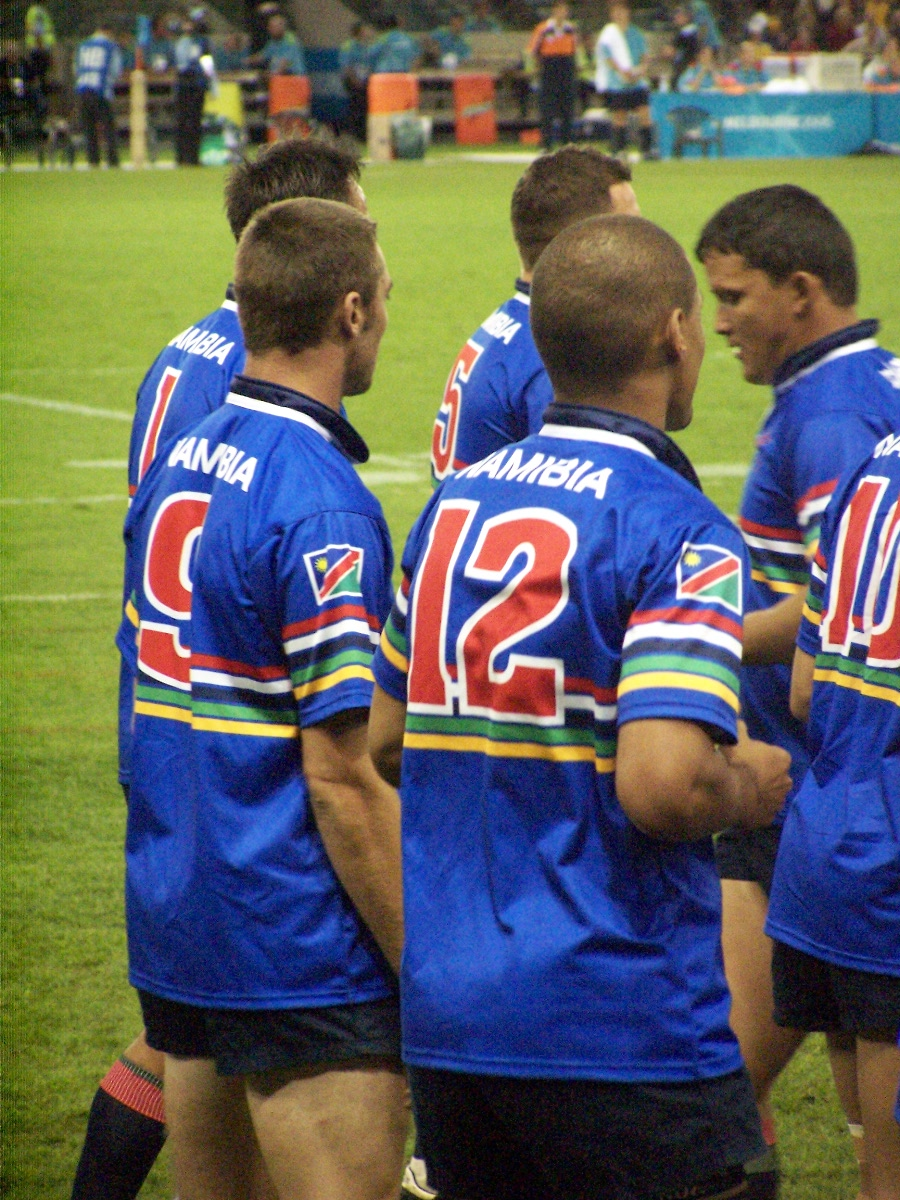
National rugby sevens team

Rugby union was introduced to Namibia from South Africa in 1916. The main governing body today is the Namibia Rugby Union.

The Namibian national team is commonly known as the Welwitschias. Namibia has qualified for the World Cup on six occasions, in 1999, 2003, 2007, 2011, 2015, 2019 and 2023, but has never won a game.

Until independence, Namibian players were also eligible to represent South Africa; Namibian- born Springboks include Jan Ellis and, more recently, Percy Montgomery. Various players pursue their rugby careers in South Africa and in a number of European countries.

== Cricket ==
The history of cricket in Namibia is closely linked with South African cricket. After independence, the newly formed Namibian Cricket Board set about developing the game throughout the country, and also arranged visits from various English county teams and The Netherlands. Namibia was granted associate membership of the ICC in 1992. Namibia played six matches in the 2003 World Cup and lost all of them. However, in their match against England, they were ahead under the Duckworth-Lewis method for twelve overs, and Jan Berrie Burger nearly brought about an upset with 85 off 86 balls. Rudi van Vuuren took 5 wickets in the match, and later that year played for Namibia in the Rugby World Cup.

Namibia qualified for the ICC World T20 in UAE and Oman in 2021, where the team won its first World Cup match, against the Netherlands, followed by a victory against Ireland to qualify for the Super 12s. The victory against Ireland was Namibia's first win against a Full member in an official international match. At the 2022 T20 World Cup in Australia, Namibia beat Sri Lanka by 55 runs at Geelong. However, they could not repeat the feat of the 2021 T20 World Cup, as they lost their next two matches to the Netherlands and the UAE.

Former South African all-rounder David Wiese is one of Namibia's best-known cricketers and has played in various T20 leagues, most notably the Pakistan Super League for Lahore Qalandars. In the 2023 IPL auction, Wiese was picked by Kolkata Knight Riders.

=== World Cup ===
- 1975 to 1992 inclusive: Not eligible - Not an ICC member
- 1996: Did not qualify
- 1999: Did not qualify
- 2003: First round
- 2007: Did not qualify
- 2021: Super 12
- 2024: First Round

=== Development Programs ===
Cricket in Namibia is mostly played by the white community, with minimal black participation.

== Athletics ==
The most prominent Namibian athlete is the former sprinter Frankie Fredericks. He was the first Olympic medalist from the country, and won four Olympic silver medals in total. He also became world champion in 1993 and won an additional three silver medals at the World Championships, all in the 200 metres event. He holds the African record in this event with 19.68 seconds, and held the African record in the 100 metres until May 2006.

Sprinters Christine Mboma and Beatrice Masilingi competed at the 2020 Tokyo Olympics. Although barred from their preferred 400 metres event due to naturally high testosterone levels, they both ran the 200 metres and qualified for the final, becoming the first female Namibian athletes to do so at the Olympics. Mboma won the silver medal in the women's 200m at the 2020 Olympics.

Other prominent athletes include middle-distance runner Agnes Samaria and long-distance runner Luketz Swartbooi, as well as paralympic athletes Johanna Benson, Ananias Shikongo, Johannes Nambala, and Reginald Benade.

== Basketball ==
Namibia has never qualified for the FIBA Africa Championship. Its basketball federation cooperates with the German federation.

== Boxing ==
Notable Namibian boxers include Japhet Uutoni (winner of gold medals at the 2006 Commonwealth Games and the 2006 African Boxing Championships), Paulus Ambunda (represented his country at the 2004 Summer Olympics in Athens), Paulus Moses, Harry Simon and Joseph Jermia (represented his country at the 2004 Summer Olympics and won a bronze medal in the 48 kg weight class at the 2003 All-Africa Games). In March 2008, Namibia hosted the final round of qualifying for the continental tournament of boxing at the 2008 Summer Olympics. In addition to Japhet Uutoni, who had already qualified for the 2008 Olympics by winning his class in the first round of qualifiers, 2 other Namibian boxers qualified (Mujandjae Kasuto and Julius Indongo). In January 2009, Paulus Moses defeated Yusuke Kobori of Japan to win the WBA lightweight title.

== Golf ==
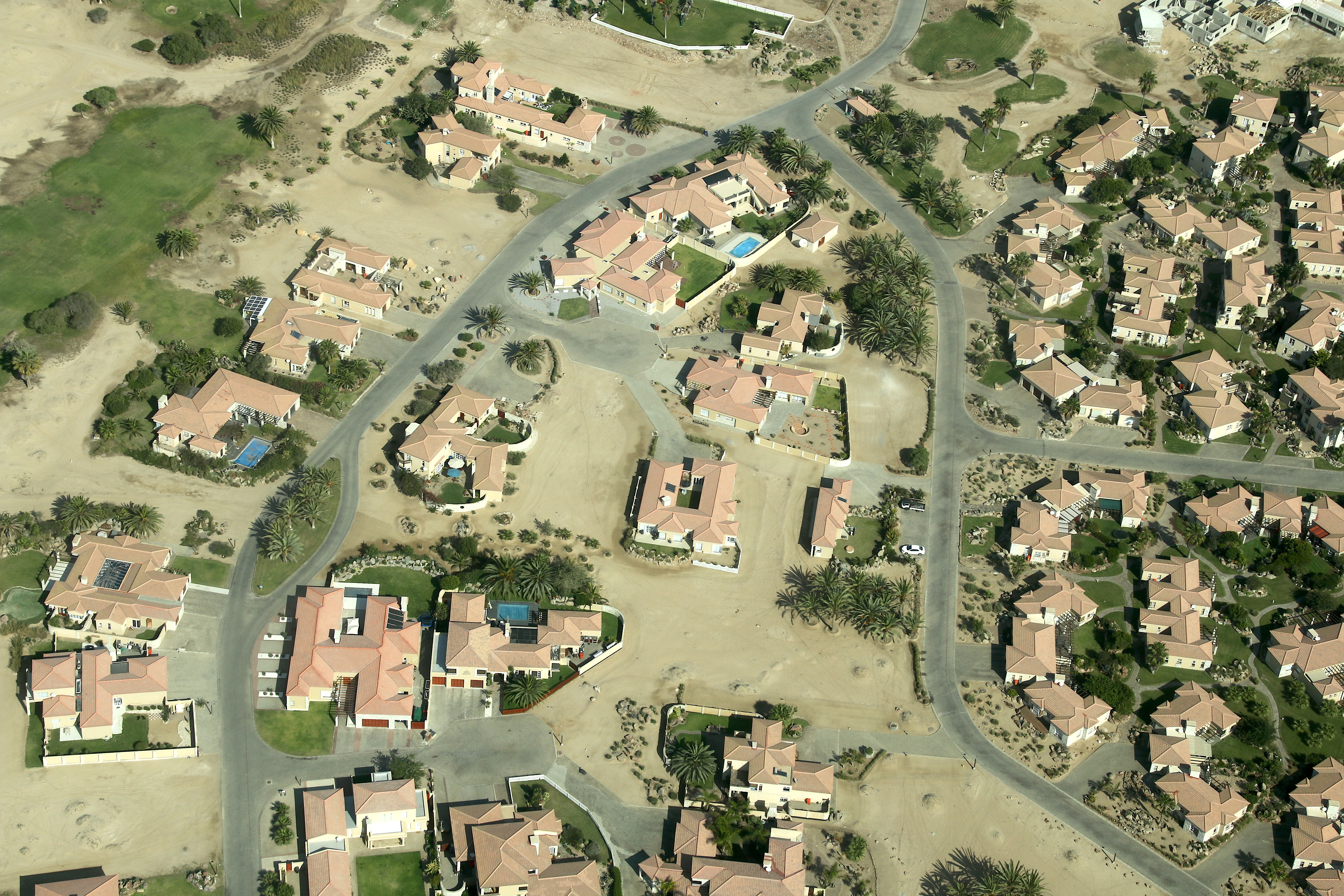
Aerial view of Rossmund Estate and Rossmund Golf Course 22°40′08″S 014°35′52″E

The most prominent Namibian golfer is Trevor Dodds.

There are 25 Golf courses in Namibia:

- Tsumeb Golf Club
- Henties Bay Golf & Lifestyle Estate
- Rossmund Desert Golf Course, Swakopmund
- Walvis Bay Golf Course
- Omeya Golf Club, between Windhoek and Rehoboth
- Windhoek Country Club Resort Golf Course
- Gobabis Golf Course
- Keetmanshoop Golf Course
- Lüderitz Golf Course
- Oranjemund Golf Club

== Horse Riding ==
=== Namibian Equestrian Riding ===
The Namibian Equestrian Federation (NAMEF) was founded in 1958 by E. Homan, E. Holtz and I. Voigts. It was originally known as the South West African Horse Society and changed its name to NAMEF after Namibia gained independence from the Republic of South Africa. Since 1992 it has been affiliated with the Namibian Sport Commission (NSC), the Namibian National Olympic Committee (NNOC) and the international body Federation Equestrian International (FEI), and represents equestrian sport at national and international level.

=== Namibian Endurance Riding ===
The Namibia Equestrian Federation is the official federation for endurance riding in Namibia. Regular endurance competitions and rides are held throughout the country under the governance of NAMEF

.

== Icestock in Namibia ==
The Icestocksport Association of Namibia was founded in 2004. The men's team has won the Africa Cup on 7 occasions (2005, 2007, 2009, 2015, 2017, 2019, 2022). The women's team won the Africa Cup in 2013 and 2017. In 2020, the men's team won the silver medal at the World Championship in group B and the bronze medal in 2022.

== Lawn Bowls in Namibia ==
Lawn bowls was one of the first sport codes in Namibia to produce a world champion. Douw Calitz won the title at the World Champion of Champions tournament in 2003 in Moama, Australia. Major national tournaments include the annual National League and the annual Namibia National Championships. In 2013, Namibia hosted the African States Tournament, a competition featuring seven African countries. The national men's side is currently ranked 11th in the world.

== Sailing ==
The Namibia Sailing Association is the national governing body for the sport of sailing in Namibia, serving at the discretion of the Namibian Sports Commission and recognised by World Sailing.

The following are affiliated:

- Walvis Bay Yacht Club
- Namib Kite & Windsurf Club
- Luderitz Yacht Club
- Nomad Sailing Club Windhoek
- Skeleton Coast Surf Club
