= Athletics at the 2020 Summer Paralympics – Men's 100 metres T11 =

Men's 100 metres T11 at the XVI Paralympic Games
- Venue: Tokyo National Stadium
- Dates: 1 September (heats & semi-finals); 2 September (final)
- Competitors: 13 from 11 nations
- Winning time: 10.82

Medalists
1st place, gold medalist(s)		Athanasios Ghavelas	Greece
2nd place, silver medalist(s)		Timothée Adolphe	France
3rd place, bronze medalist(s)		Di Dongdong	China

Men's 100 metres
T11 · T12 · T13 · T33 · T34 · T35 · T36 · T37 · T38 · T47 · T51 · T52 · T53 · T54 · T63 · T64

The men's 100 metres T11 event at the 2020 Summer Paralympics in Tokyo, took place between 1 and 2 September 2021.

The T11 category is for athletes with a visual impairment. A T11 athlete may be entirely without sight, or be able to perceive light, but have no ability to see the shape of a hand at any distance. T11 athletes commonly run with guides.

== Records ==
Prior to the competition, the existing records were as follows:

World Record	David Brown (USA)	10.92	Walnut, United States	18 April 2014
Paralympic Record	David Brown (USA)	10.99	Rio de Janeiro, Brazil	11 September 2016

Area	Time	Athlete	Nation
Africa	11.11	Ananias Shikongo	Namibia
America	10.92 WR	David Brown	United States
Asia	11.10	Di Dongdong	China
Europe	10.98	Athanasios Ghavelas	Greece
Oceania	Vacant		

== Results ==
=== Heats ===
==== Heat 1 ====
Rank	Lane	Athlete	Nation	Time	Notes
1	7	Lucas Prado	Brazil	11.17	Q, SB
2	5	Ananias Shikongo	Namibia	11.21	q, SB
3	3	Guillaume Junior Atangana	Cameroon	11.52	PB
Source:				Wind: +1.2 m/s	

==== Heat 2 ====
Rank	Lane	Athlete	Nation	Time	Notes
1	5	Timothée Adolphe	France	11.12	Q
2	7	David Brown	United States	11.34	q
	3	Emmanuel Grace Mouambako	Republic of the Congo	DNS	
Source:				Wind: +0.5 m/s	

==== Heat 3 ====
Rank	Lane	Athlete	Nation	Time	Notes
1	7	Athanasios Ghavelas	Greece	10.88	Q, WR
2	3	Gerard Descarrega	Spain	11.30	q, PB
3	5	Daniel Mendes da Silva	Brazil	11.60	SB
Source:				Wind: +0.9 m/s	

==== Heat 4 ====
Rank	Lane	Athlete	Nation	Time	Notes
1	3	Di Dongdong	China	11.07	Q, AR
2	5	Felipe Gomes	Brazil	11.35	q, SB
3	1	Mama Saliu Bari	Guinea-Bissau	12.48	PB
	7	Mohamed Mazin	Maldives	DQ	WPA 7.10.4
Source:				Wind: +0.8 m/s	

=== Semi-finals ===
==== Heat 1 ====
First in each heat (Q) and the next 2 fastest (q) advance to the Final round.

Rank	Lane	Athlete	Nation	Time	Notes
1	3	Timothée Adolphe	France	11.06	Q
2	5	Di Dongdong	China	11.23	q
3	7	Gerard Descarrega	Spain	11.39	
4	1	Felipe Gomes	Brazil	11.68	
Source:				Wind: +1.0 m/s	

==== Heat 2 ====
Rank	Lane	Athlete	Nation	Time	Notes
1	3	Athanasios Ghavelas	Greece	10.99	Q
2	7	Ananias Shikongo	Namibia	11.33	q
3	5	Lucas Prado	Brazil	11.44	
4	1	David Brown	United States	11.50	
Source:				Wind: +0.2 m/s	

=== Final ===
The final took place on 2 September 2021, at 19:10:

Rank	Lane	Athlete	Nation	Time	Notes
1st place, gold medalist(s)	3	Athanasios Ghavelas	Greece	10.82	WR
2nd place, silver medalist(s)	5	Timothée Adolphe	France	10.90	PB
3rd place, bronze medalist(s)	7	Di Dongdong	China	11.03	AR
	1	Ananias Shikongo	Namibia	DQ	WPA 7.9.3
Source:				Wind: +1.2 m/s	
