= Namibia at the 2024 Summer Paralympics =

- IPC code: NAM
- NPC: Namibia National Paralympic Committee

in Paris, France August 28, 2024 – September 8, 2024
- Competitors: 5 in 1 sport
- Flag bearers: Lahja Ishitile; Chris Kinda
- Medals Ranked 61st: Gold 1 Silver 0 Bronze 1 Total 2

Summer Paralympics appearances (overview)
- 1992; 1996–2000; 2004; 2008; 2012; 2016; 2020; 2024

Namibia competed at the 2024 Summer Paralympics in Paris, France, from 28 August to 8 September.

== Medalists ==
| Medal | Name | Sport | Event | Date |
|---|---|---|---|---|
| Gold | Lahja Ishitile | Athletics | Women's 400 m T11 | 31 August |
| Bronze | Lahja Ishitile | Athletics | Women's 200 m T11 | 7 September |

=== Medals by sport ===
Medals by sport
| Sport | 1st place, gold medalist(s) | 2nd place, silver medalist(s) | 3rd place, bronze medalist(s) | Total |
| Athletics | 1 | 0 | 1 | 2 |
| Total | 1 | 0 | 1 | 2 |

=== Medals by gender ===
Medals by gender
| Gender | 1st place, gold medalist(s) | 2nd place, silver medalist(s) | 3rd place, bronze medalist(s) | Total |
| Female | 1 | 0 | 1 | 2 |
| Male | 0 | 0 | 0 | 0 |
| Mixed | 0 | 0 | 0 | 0 |
| Total | 1 | 0 | 1 | 2 |

=== Medals by date ===
Medals by date
| Date | 1st place, gold medalist(s) | 2nd place, silver medalist(s) | 3rd place, bronze medalist(s) | Total |
| 31 August | 1 | 0 | 0 | 1 |
| 7 September | 0 | 0 | 1 | 1 |
| Total | 1 | 0 | 1 | 2 |

== Competitors ==
The following is the list of number of competitors in the Games.

| Sport | Men | Women | Total |
|---|---|---|---|
| Athletics | 4 | 1 | 5 |
| Total | 4 | 1 | 5 |

== Athletics ==
Namibian track and field athletes achieved quota places for the following events based on their results at the 2023 World Championships, 2024 World Championships, or through high performance allocation, as long as they meet the minimum entry standard (MES).

Key

- Note–Ranks given for track events are within the athlete's heat only
- Q = Qualified for the next round
- q = Qualified for the next round as a fastest loser or, in field events, by position without achieving the qualifying target
- DQ = Disqualified
- PR = Paralympic Record
- AR = Area (or continental) Record
- NR = National Record
- SB = Season's Best
- N/A = Round not applicable for the event
- Bye = Athlete not required to compete in round

Track & road events

| Athlete | Event | Heat | | Semifinal | | Final | |
| Athlete | Event | Result | Rank | Result | Rank | Result | Rank |
|---|---|---|---|---|---|---|---|
| Ananias Shikongo | Men's 100 m T11 | 11.39 | 1 Q | 11.18 | 2 q | 11.17 | 4 |
| Ananias Shikongo | Men's 400 m T11 | 53.51 | 3 | Did not advance | | | |
| Chris Kinda | Men's 100 m T11 | 11.57 | 3 q | 11.60 | 4 | Did not advance | |
| Chris Kinda | Men's 400 m T11 | 53.00 | 2 q | 52.95 | 3 | Did not advance | |
| Johannes Nambala | Men's 100 m T13 | 11.10 | 5 q | —N/a | | 11.09 | 8 |
| Johannes Nambala | Men's 400 m T13 | —N/a | | | | 48.89 | 4 |
| Petrus Karuli | Men's 100 m T37 | 12.74 | 5 | Did not advance | | | |
| Petrus Karuli | Men's 200 m T37 | 25.24 | 7 | Did not advance | | | |
| Petrus Karuli | Men's 400 m T37 | DQ | | Did not advance | | | |
| Lahja Ishitile | Women's 100 m T11 | 12.12 AR | 2 q | 12.19 (.187) | 5 | Did not advance | |
| Lahja Ishitile | Women's 200 m T11 | 24.82 | 2 q | —N/a | | 25.04 | 3rd place, bronze medalist(s) |
| Lahja Ishitile | Women's 400 m T11 | 57.73 | 1 Q | 57.74 | 1 Q | 56.20 PR | 1st place, gold medalist(s) |

== See also ==
- Namibia at the 2024 Summer Olympics
- Namibia at the Paralympics
