= Namibia at the 2012 Summer Paralympics =

- IPC code: NAM
- NPC: Namibia National Paralympic Committee

in London
- Competitors: 5 in 2 sports
- Medals Ranked 47th: Gold 1 Silver 1 Bronze 0 Total 2

Summer Paralympics appearances (overview)
- 1992; 1996–2000; 2004; 2008; 2012; 2016; 2020; 2024

Namibia competed at the 2012 Summer Paralympics in London, United Kingdom from August 29 to September 9, 2012.

== Medallists ==
Medal	Name	Sport	Event	Date
Gold	Johanna Benson	Athletics	Women's 200m T37	5 September
Silver	Johanna Benson	Athletics	Women's 100m T37	2 September

== Athletics ==
Men’s track

Athlete	Event	Heat		Semifinal		Final	
Athlete	Event	Result	Rank	Result	Rank	Result	Rank
Ananias Shikongo	100m T11	11.55	3 q	11.49	3	Did not advance	
Ananias Shikongo	200m T11	23.02	2 q	23.20	3	Did not advance	
Ananias Shikongo	400m T11	52.45	2	—		Did not advance	
Martin Aloisius	400m T12	57.73	3	Did not advance			

Men’s field

Athlete	Event	Distance	Rank
Reginald Benade	Discus throw F35-36	37.28	6

Women’s track

Athlete	Event	Heat		Final	
Athlete	Event	Result	Rank	Result	Rank
Johanna Benson	100m T37	14.63	4 q	14.23	2nd place, silver medalist(s)
Johanna Benson	200m T37	29.39	1 Q	29.26 AF	1st place, gold medalist(s)

Women’s field

Athlete	Event	Distance	Rank
Johanna Benson	Long Jump F37-38	3.71	10

== Powerlifting ==
Men

Athlete	Event	Result	Rank
Ruben Soroseb	-100kg	190	9

== See also ==
- Namibia at the Paralympics
- Namibia at the 2012 Summer Olympics
