= Athletics at the 2016 Summer Paralympics – Men's 100 metres T11 =

Men's 100 metres T11 at the XV Paralympic Games
- Venue: Estádio Olímpico João Havelange
- Dates: 10–11 September 2016
- Competitors: 20 from 15 nations

Medalists
1st place, gold medalist(s)		David Brown	United States
2nd place, silver medalist(s)		Felipe Gomes	Brazil
3rd place, bronze medalist(s)		Ananias Shikongo	Namibia

The Men's 100 metres T11 event at the 2016 Paralympic Games took place between 10 and 11 September 2016, at the Estádio Olímpico João Havelange. The event was held over three rounds.

The T11 category is for athletes with a visual impairment. A T11 athlete may be entirely without sight, or be able to perceive light, but have no ability to see the shape of a hand at any distance. T11 athletes commonly run with guides.

== Records ==
These were the World and Paralympic Games records at the beginning of the event.

World Record	10.92	David Brown	(United States)	Walnut, California	(USA)	18	APR	2014
Paralympic Record	11.03	Lucas Prado	(Brazil)	Beijing	(CHN)	9	SEP	2008

== Heats ==
=== Heat 1 ===
10:12 10 September 2016:

Rank	Lane	Bib	Name	Nationality	Reaction	Time	Notes
1	3	1610	Abdul Halim Dalimunte	Indonesia	0.167	11.62	Q
2	1	1158	Lucas Prado	Brazil	0.157	11.64	q
3	5	2353	Lex Gillette	United States	0.133	11.68	q
	7	1025	Jose Chamoleia	Angola			DSQ

=== Heat 2 ===
10:19 10 September 2016:

Rank	Lane	Bib	Name	Nationality	Reaction	Time	Notes
1	5	1466	Timothee Adolphe	France	0.171	11.11	Q
2	1	1241	Di Dongdong	China	0.171	11.21	q
3	7	2398	Miran Sakhatov	Uzbekistan	0.147	11.87	
4	3	1425	Xavier Porras	Spain	0.165	11.99	

=== Heat 3 ===
10:26 10 September 2016:

Rank	Lane	Bib	Name	Nationality	Reaction	Time	Notes
1	1	1911	Ananias Shikongo	Namibia	0.251	11.17	Q
2	7	1139	Ricardo Costa de Oliveira	Brazil	0.179	11.66	q
3	3	1303	Delfo Jose Arce Orozco	Colombia	0.148	11.68	q
	5	1085	Elchin Muradov	Azerbaijan	0.166		DSQ

=== Heat 4 ===
10:33 10 September 2016:

Rank	Lane	Bib	Name	Nationality	Reaction	Time	Notes
1	5	1146	Felipe Gomes	Brazil	0.187	11.22	Q
2	1	1389	Joselito Hernandez	Dominican Republic	0.198	11.73	
3	3	1424	Martin Parejo Maza	Spain	0.154	11.91	
4	7	2255	Chuan-Hui Yang	Chinese Taipei	0.164	11.93	

=== Heat 5 ===
10:40 10 September 2016:

Rank	Lane	Bib	Name	Nationality	Reaction	Time	Notes
1	3	2347	David Brown	United States	0.147	11.35	Q
2	7	1026	Octavio Angelo dos Santos	Angola	0.196	11.68	q
3	5	2407	Fernando Ferrer	Venezuela	0.157	11.70	q
4	1	1936	Bikram Rana	Nepal	0.233	13.02	

== Semifinals ==
=== Semifinal 1 ===
20:00 10 September 2016:

Rank	Lane	Bib	Name	Nationality	Reaction	Time	Notes
1	3	1911	Ananias Shikongo	Namibia	0.172	11.23	Q
2	7	1139	Ricardo Costa de Oliveira	Brazil	0.180	11.44	
3	5	1610	Abdul Halim Dalimunte	Indonesia	0.195	11.58	
4	1	2353	Lex Gillette	United States	0.171	11.73	

=== Semifinal 2 ===
20:06 10 September 2016:

Rank	Lane	Bib	Name	Nationality	Reaction	Time	Notes
1	5	2347	David Brown	United States	0.139	11.04	Q
2	3	1146	Felipe Gomes	Brazil	0.189	11.15	q
3	7	1303	Delfo Jose Arce Orozco	Colombia	0.162	11.68	
4	1	1026	Octavio Angelo dos Santos	Angola	0.178	11.71	

=== Semifinal 3 ===
20:12 10 September 2016:

Rank	Lane	Bib	Name	Nationality	Reaction	Time	Notes
1	3	1241	Di Dongdong	China	0.167	11.28	Q
2	5	1466	Timothee Adolphe	France	0.140	11.28	
3	1	2407	Fernando Ferrer	Venezuela	0.148	11.67	
	7	1158	Lucas Prado	Brazil			DSQ

== Final ==
19:02 11 September 2016:

Rank	Lane	Bib	Name	Nationality	Reaction	Time	Notes
1st place, gold medalist(s)	3	2347	David Brown	United States	0.123	10.99	PR
2nd place, silver medalist(s)	1	1146	Felipe Gomes	Brazil	0.176	11.08	
3rd place, bronze medalist(s)	5	1911	Ananias Shikongo	Namibia	0.199	11.11	
4	7	1241	Di Dongdong	China	0.188	11.32	
