= Athletics at the 2020 Summer Paralympics – Men's 400 metres T11 =

Men's 400 metres T11 at the XVI Paralympic Games
- Venue: Tokyo National Stadium
- Dates: 28 August 2021 (heats); 29 August 2021 (final)
- Competitors: 11 from 7 nations
- Winning time: 50.42

Medalists
1st place, gold medalist(s)		Gerard Descarrega	Spain
2nd place, silver medalist(s)		Ananias Shikongo	Namibia
3rd place, bronze medalist(s)		Gautier Makunda	France

The men's 400 metres T11 event at the 2020 Summer Paralympics in Tokyo, took place between 28 and 29 August 2021.

The T11 category is for athletes with a visual impairment. A T11 athlete may be entirely without sight, or be able to perceive light, but have no ability to see the shape of a hand at any distance. T11 athletes commonly run with guides.

== Records ==
Prior to the competition, the existing records were as follows:

World Record	Daniel Silva (BRA)	49.82	Guadalajara, Mexico	18 November 2011
Paralympic Record	José Sayovo (ANG)	50.03	Athens, Greece	25 September 2004

Area	Time	Athlete	Nation
Africa	50.03	José Sayovo	Angola
America	49.82 WR	Daniel Silva	Brazil
Asia	51.56	Di Dongdong	China
Europe	50.22	Gerard Descarrega	Spain
Oceania	vacant		

== Results ==
=== Heats ===
Heat 1 took place on 28 August 2021, at 11:54:

Rank	Lane	Name	Nationality	Time	Notes
1	7	Gerard Descarrega	Spain	50.61	Q, SB
2	5	Gautier Makunda	France	51.99	q
	3	Enderson German Santos Gonzalez	Venezuela	DNS	

Heat 2 took place on 28 August 2021, at 10:50:

Rank	Lane	Name	Nationality	Time	Notes
1	7	Ananias Shikongo	Namibia	51.22	Q, SB
2	3	Eduardo Manuel Uceda Novas	Spain	52.01	PB
	5	Daniel Silva	Brazil	DQ	WPA 7.9.3

Heat 3 took place on 28 August 2021, at 10:50:

Rank	Lane	Name	Nationality	Time	Notes
1	3	Guillaume Junior Atangana	Cameroon	52.40	Q, PB
2	5	Felipe Gomes	Brazil	53.58	SB
3	7	Patrekur Axelsson	Iceland	56.73	PB
	1	Timothée Adolphe	France	DQ	WPA 7.9.3

=== Final ===
The final took place on 29 August 2021, at 19:35:

Rank	Lane	Name	Nationality	Time	Notes
1st place, gold medalist(s)	5	Gerard Descarrega	Spain	50.42	SB
2nd place, silver medalist(s)	3	Ananias Shikongo	Namibia	51.14	SB
3rd place, bronze medalist(s)	1	Gautier Makunda	France	51.74	PB
4	7	Guillaume Junior Atangana	Cameroon	52.17	PB
