= Athletics at the 2016 Summer Paralympics – Men's 400 metres T11 =

Men's 400 metres T11 at the XV Paralympic Games
- Venue: Estádio Olímpico João Havelange
- Dates: 16–17 September 2016
- Competitors: 12 from 9 nations

Medalists
1st place, gold medalist(s)		Gerard Descarrega Puigdevall	Spain
2nd place, silver medalist(s)		Felipe Gomes	Brazil
3rd place, bronze medalist(s)		Ananias Shikongo	Namibia

The T11 category is for athletes with a visual impairment. A T11 athlete may be entirely without sight, or be able to perceive light, but have no ability to see the shape of a hand at any distance. T11 athletes commonly run with guides.

The Athletics at the 2016 Summer Paralympics – Men's 400 metres T11 event at the 2016 Paralympic Games took place on 16–17 September 2016, at the Estádio Olímpico João Havelange.

== Heats ==
=== Heat 1 ===
17:36 16 September 2016:

Rank	Lane	Bib	Name	Nationality	Reaction	Time	Notes
1	7	1167	Daniel Silva	Brazil	0.151	51.96	Q
2	1	1025	Jose Chamoleia	Angola	0.179	53.00	
3	3	2347	David Brown	United States	0.161	53.81	
	5	1466	Timothee Adolphe	France	0.158		DSQ

=== Heat 2 ===
17:42 16 September 2016:

Rank	Lane	Bib	Name	Nationality	Reaction	Time	Notes
1	3	1146	Felipe Gomes	Brazil	0.162	51.26	Q
2	7	2290	Mehmet Tunc	Turkey	0.188	53.19	
3	1	2233	Suphachai Songphinit	Thailand	0.178	53.91	
	5	1242	Zetan Fan	China	0.155		DSQ

=== Heat 3 ===
17:48 16 September 2016:

Rank	Lane	Bib	Name	Nationality	Reaction	Time	Notes
1	5	1419	Gerard Descarrega Puigdevall	Spain	0.185	50.53	Q
2	3	1911	Ananias Shikongo	Namibia	0.195	50.85	q
3	1	1026	Octavio Angelo dos Santos	Angola	0.202	53.14	
	7	1158	Lucas Prado	Brazil			DSQ

== Final ==
18:49 17 September 2016:

Rank	Lane	Bib	Name	Nationality	Reaction	Time	Notes
1st place, gold medalist(s)	3	1419	Gerard Descarrega Puigdevall	Spain	0.146	50.22	
2nd place, silver medalist(s)	5	1146	Felipe Gomes	Brazil	0.175	50.38	
3rd place, bronze medalist(s)	1	1911	Ananias Shikongo	Namibia	0.202	50.63	
4	7	1167	Daniel Silva	Brazil	0.167	50.93	
