= Athletics at the 2016 Summer Paralympics – Women's 100 metres T37 =

Women's 100 metres T37 at the XV Paralympic Games
- Venue: Estádio Olímpico João Havelange
- Dates: 9 September 2016
- Competitors: 11 from 10 nations

Medalists
1st place, gold medalist(s)		Georgina Hermitage	Great Britain
2nd place, silver medalist(s)		Mandy Francois-Elie	France
3rd place, bronze medalist(s)		Yescarly Medina	Venezuela

The T37 category is for ambulant athletes with cerebral palsy. These athletes have movement and coordination problems on one half of their body. They have good ability in their dominant side of their body (ie hemiplegia).

The Athletics at the 2016 Summer Paralympics – Women's 100 metres T37 event at the 2016 Paralympic Games took place on 9 September 2016, at the Estádio Olímpico João Havelange.

== Heats ==
=== Heat 1 ===
19:51 8 September 2016:

Rank	Lane	Bib	Name	Nationality	Reaction	Time	Notes
1	8	305	Mandy Francois-Elie	France		13.69	Q
2	4	935	Yescarly Medina	Venezuela		14.11	Q
3	6	598	Johanna Benson	Namibia		14.23	Q
4	3	168	Yingli Li	China		14.25	q
5	5	363	Isabelle Foerder	Germany		15.04	
6	7	605	Jennifer Osejo	Nicaragua		18.18	

=== Heat 2 ===
19:58 8 September 2016:

Rank	Lane	Bib	Name	Nationality	Reaction	Time	Notes
1	4	332	Georgina Hermitage	Great Britain		13.39	Q
2	7	828	Neda Bahi	Tunisia		13.97	Q
3	3	375	Maria Seifert	Germany		14.06	Q
4	6	735	Liezel Gouws	South Africa		14.88	q
5	5	213	Dayana Anyuor Guerra Beltran	Colombia		16.33	

== Final ==
17:36 9 September 2016:

Rank	Lane	Bib	Name	Nationality	Reaction	Time	Notes
1st place, gold medalist(s)	6	332	Georgina Hermitage	Great Britain		13.13	
2nd place, silver medalist(s)	4	305	Mandy Francois-Elie	France		13.45	
3rd place, bronze medalist(s)	7	935	Yescarly Medina	Venezuela		13.85	
4	5	828	Neda Bahi	Tunisia		13.88	
5	2	168	Yingli Li	China		14.05	
6	8	375	Maria Seifert	Germany		14.13	
7	9	598	Johanna Benson	Namibia		14.16	
8	3	735	Liezel Gouws	South Africa		14.84	
