= Namibia at the 2008 Summer Paralympics =

- IPC code: NAM
- NPC: Namibia National Paralympic Committee

in Beijing
- Competitors: 1 in 1 sport
- Flag bearer: Reginald Benade (opening & closing)
- Medals Ranked 69th: Gold 0 Silver 0 Bronze 1 Total 1

Summer Paralympics appearances (overview)
- 1992; 1996–2000; 2004; 2008; 2012; 2016; 2020; 2024

Namibia sent a delegate to compete at the 2008 Summer Paralympics in Beijing, China. According to official records, the country's only representative was Reginald Benade, who appeared in two events in athletics and won a bronze medal in the discus throw.

== Medallists ==
Medal	Name	Sport	Event	Date
Bronze	Reginald Benade	Athletics	Men's Discus Throw - F35/36	11th

== Athletics ==
Men

Athlete	Class	Event	Heats		Semifinal		Final		
Athlete	Class	Event	Result	Rank	Result	Rank	Result	Points	Rank
Reginald Benade	F35-36 (F36)	Shot put	N/A				11.59	929	6
Reginald Benade	F35-36 (F36)	Discus throw	N/A				37.57	1076	Bronze medal

== See also ==
- Namibia at the Paralympics
- Namibia at the 2008 Summer Olympics
