= Athletics at the 2016 Summer Paralympics – Men's 200 metres T11 =

Men's 200 metres T11 at the XV Paralympic Games
- Venue: Estádio Olímpico João Havelange
- Dates: 13–15 September 2016
- Competitors: 15 from 10 nations

Medalists
1st place, gold medalist(s)		Ananias Shikongo	Namibia
2nd place, silver medalist(s)		Felipe Gomes	Brazil
3rd place, bronze medalist(s)		Daniel Silva	Brazil

The T11 category is for athletes with a visual impairment. A T11 athlete may be entirely without sight, or be able to perceive light, but have no ability to see the shape of a hand at any distance. T11 athletes commonly run with guides.

The Athletics at the 2016 Summer Paralympics – Men's 200 metres T11 event at the 2016 Paralympic Games took place on 13–15 September 2016, at the Estádio Olímpico João Havelange.

== Heats ==
=== Heat 1 ===
18:45 13 September 2016:

Rank	Lane	Bib	Name	Nationality	Reaction	Time	Notes
1	7	1167	Daniel Silva	Brazil	0.165	23.39	Q
2	3	2290	Mehmet Tunc	Turkey	0.151	24.04	q
3	5	1026	Octavio Angelo dos Santos	Angola	0.213	24.13	
4	1	1610	Abdul Halim Dalimunte	Indonesia	0.182	24.66	

=== Heat 2 ===
18:52 13 September 2016:

Rank	Lane	Bib	Name	Nationality	Reaction	Time	Notes
1	1	1911	Ananias Shikongo	Namibia	0.193	22.93	Q
2	3	1242	Fan Zetan	China	0.151	23.33	q
3	7	2407	Fernando Ferrer	Venezuela	0.176	24.21	
	5	1158	Lucas Prado	Brazil			DSQ

=== Heat 3 ===
18:59 13 September 2016:

Rank	Lane	Bib	Name	Nationality	Reaction	Time	Notes
1	3	2347	David Brown	United States	0.141	23.45	Q
2	5	1303	Delfo Jose Arce Orozco	Colombia	0.155	24.20	
3	7	1389	Joselito Hernandez	Dominican Republic	0.196	24.38	

=== Heat 4 ===
19:06 13 September 2016:

Rank	Lane	Bib	Name	Nationality	Reaction	Time	Notes
1	3	1146	Felipe Gomes	Brazil	0.188	23.00	Q
2	7	1025	Jose Chamoleia	Angola	0.207	23.33	q
3	1	1241	Di Dongdong	China	0.170	23.39	q
4	5	1912	Moses Tobias	Namibia	0.166	24.17	

== Semifinals ==
=== Semifinal 1 ===
11:51 14 September 2016:

Rank	Lane	Bib	Name	Nationality	Reaction	Time	Notes
1	5	1911	Ananias Shikongo	Namibia	0.193	22.48	Q
2	3	1167	Daniel Silva	Brazil	0.154	23.01	q
3	1	1241	Di Dongdong	China	0.162	23.22	
4	7	1025	Jose Chamoleia	Angola	0.205	23.46	

=== Semifinal 2 ===
11:57 14 September 2016:

Rank	Lane	Bib	Name	Nationality	Reaction	Time	Notes
1	5	1146	Felipe Gomes	Brazil	0.194	22.50	Q
2	7	1242	Fan Zetan	China	0.147	23.15	q
3	3	2347	David Brown	United States	0.144	23.32	
	1	2290	Mehmet Tunc	Turkey			DSQ

== Final ==
17:51 15 September 2016:

Rank	Lane	Bib	Name	Nationality	Reaction	Time	Notes
1st place, gold medalist(s)	3	1911	Ananias Shikongo	Namibia	0.183	22.44	
2nd place, silver medalist(s)	5	1146	Felipe Gomes	Brazil	0.203	22.52	
3rd place, bronze medalist(s)	7	1167	Daniel Silva	Brazil	0.167	23.04	
4	1	1242	Fan Zetan	China	0.164	23.24	
