= Namibia at the 2020 Summer Paralympics =

- Flag of Namibia
- IPC code: NAM
- NPC: Namibia National Paralympic Committee

in Tokyo, Japan August 24, 2021 – September 5, 2021
- Competitors: 2 in 1 sport
- Medals: Gold 0 Silver 1 Bronze 1 Total 2

Summer Paralympics appearances (overview)
- 1992; 1996–2000; 2004; 2008; 2012; 2016; 2020; 2024

Namibia competed at the 2020 Summer Paralympics in Tokyo, Japan, from 24 August to 5 September 2021.

== Medalists ==
Medal	Name	Sport	Event	Date
Silver	Ananias Shikongo	Athletics	Men's 400 metres T11	29 August
Bronze	Johannes Nambala	Athletics	Men's 400 metres T13	2 September

== Athletics ==
Johannes Nambala represented Namibia at the 2020 Summer Paralympics. He qualified to compete in the men's 100m T13 event after winning the bronze medal in the men's 100 metres T13 event at the 2019 World Para Athletics Championships held in Dubai, United Arab Emirates. He also qualified for the men's 400m T13 event after winning the gold medal in the men's 400 metres T13 event at the 2019 World Championships.

Ananias Shikongo also represented Namibia at the 2020 Summer Paralympics.

Men's track

Athlete	Event	Heats		Final	
Athlete	Event	Result	Rank	Result	Rank
Johannes Nambala	Men's 100m T13				
Johannes Nambala	Men's 400m T13				
Ananias Shikongo	Men's 400m T11				

== See also ==
- Namibia at the Paralympics
- Namibia at the 2020 Summer Olympics
