= Athletics at the 2016 Summer Paralympics – Men's 400 metres T13 =

Men's 400 metres T13 at the XV Paralympic Games
- Venue: Estádio Olímpico João Havelange
- Dates: 13–15 September 2016
- Competitors: 10 from 6 nations

Medalists
1st place, gold medalist(s)		Mohamed Amguoun	Morocco
2nd place, silver medalist(s)		Johannes Nambala	Namibia
3rd place, bronze medalist(s)		Mohamed Fouad Hamoumou	Algeria

The T13 category is for athletes with a moderate visual impairment. Athletes in this category have a variety of visual impairments, but can typically recognize contours from a distance of 2 to 6 metres. Athletes in this category do not typically require a guide.

The athletics at the 2016 Summer Paralympics – men's 400 metres T13 event at the 2016 Paralympic Games took place on 13–15 September 2016, at the Estádio Olímpico João Havelange.

== Heats ==
=== Heat 1 ===
17:30 13 September 2016:

Rank	Lane	Bib	Name	Nationality	Reaction	Time	Notes
1	5	1016	Mohamed Fouad Hamoumou	Algeria	0.170	49.08	Q
2	7	1007	Abdellatif Baka	Algeria	0.170	50.15	Q
3	6	2356	Tyson Gunter	United States	0.173	51.30	Q
4	3	1171	Kesley Teodoro	Brazil	0.174	53.27	
	4	1442	Tamiru Demisse	Ethiopia			DSQ

=== Heat 2 ===
17:38 13 September 2016:

Rank	Lane	Bib	Name	Nationality	Reaction	Time	Notes
1	6	1848	Mohamed Amguoun	Morocco	0.168	48.82	Q
2	4	1909	Johannes Nambala	Namibia	0.194	49.01	Q
3	7	1008	Fouad Baka	Algeria	0.149	49.04	Q
4	3	1136	Gustavo Henrique Araujo	Brazil	0.173	50.09	q
5	5	2366	Markeith Price	United States	0.198	50.20	q

== Final ==
12:12 15 September 2016:

Rank	Lane	Bib	Name	Nationality	Reaction	Time	Notes
1st place, gold medalist(s)	5	1848	Mohamed Amguoun	Morocco	0.183	47.15	WR PR
2nd place, silver medalist(s)	3	1909	Johannes Nambala	Namibia	0.215	47.21	
3rd place, bronze medalist(s)	6	1016	Mohamed Fouad Hamoumou	Algeria	0.132	48.04	
4	8	1008	Fouad Baka	Algeria	0.183	49.09	
5	1	2366	Markeith Price	United States	0.208	49.96	
6	2	1136	Gustavo Henrique Araujo	Brazil	0.129	50.06	
7	7	2356	Tyson Gunter	United States	0.197	50.36	
	4	1007	Abdellatif Baka	Algeria			DSQ
