= Namibia at the 1992 Summer Paralympics =

- IPC code: NAM
- NPC: Namibia National Paralympic Committee

in Barcelona
- Competitors: 2
- Medals: Gold 0 Silver 0 Bronze 0 Total 0

Summer Paralympics appearances (overview)
- 1992; 1996–2000; 2004; 2008; 2012; 2016; 2020; 2024

Namibia competed at the 1992 Summer Paralympics in Barcelona, Spain. 2 competitors from Namibia won no medals and so did not place in the medal table.

== See also ==
- Namibia at the Paralympics
- Namibia at the 1992 Summer Olympics
