= Felipe Gomes (sprinter) =

Brazilian Paralympic athlete

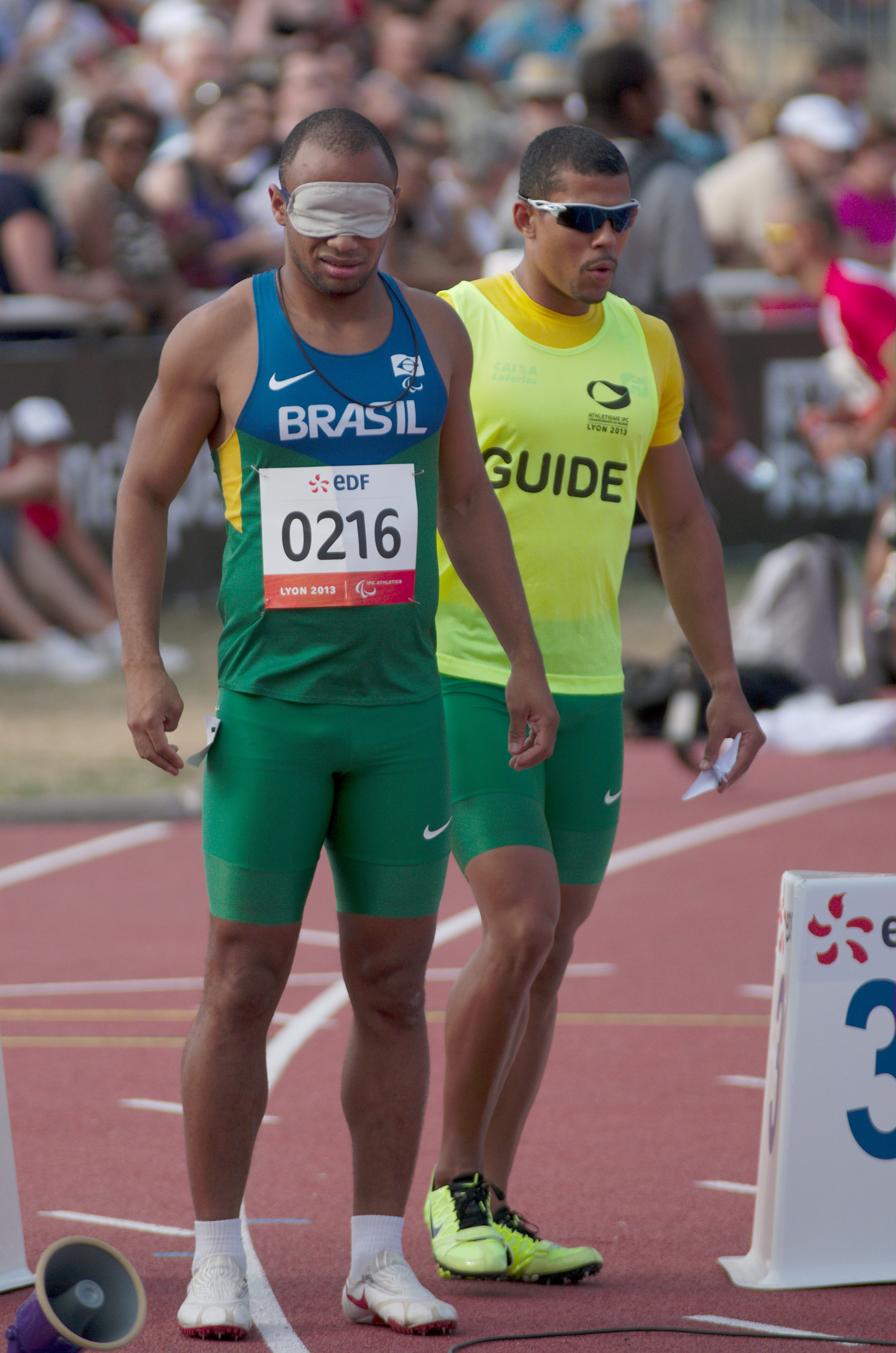
- Gomes at the 2013 IPC World Championships

Personal information
- Full name: Felipe de Sousa Gomes
- Born: 26 April 1986 (age 40) Rio de Janeiro, Brazil

Sport
- Country: Brazil
- Sport: Para athletics
- Disability class: T11
- Event: Sprint
- Club: Superar Institute
- Coached by: Diogo Cardoso da Silva
Medal record
Representing Brazil
Paralympic Games
Gold medal – first place	2012 London	200m - T11
Gold medal – first place	2016 Rio	4 x 100 m relay T11-13
Silver medal – second place	2016 Rio	100 m T11
Silver medal – second place	2016 Rio	200 m T11
Silver medal – second place	2016 Rio	400 m T11
Bronze medal – third place	2012 London	100m - T11
World Championships
Gold medal – first place	2015 Doha	200m - T11
Gold medal – first place	2023 Paris	400m - T11
Silver medal – second place	2006 Assen	4x100m relay - T11-13
Silver medal – second place	2013 Lyon	100m - T11
Silver medal – second place	2015 Doha	100m - T11
Bronze medal – third place	2024 Kobe	400m - T11
Parapan American Games
Gold medal – first place	2015 Toronto	400m - T11
Silver medal – second place	2007 Rio	100m - T11
Silver medal – second place	2015 Toronto	200m - T11
Silver medal – second place	2019 Lima	100m - T11
Silver medal – second place	2019 Lima	400m - T11
Bronze medal – third place	2007 Rio	200m - T11

Felipe de Sousa Gomes (born 26 April 1986), known as Felipe Gomes, is a Paralympic athlete from Brazil. He mainly competes in category T11 sprint events. At the 2012 Summer Paralympics in London he took the gold in the T11 200m sprint.

== Career history ==
Gomes first competed in a Summer Paralympics in 2008 when he attended the games in Beijing. There he reached the finals of the 100m finishing eighth and although qualifying past the first round of the 200m he did not start the semi-finals due to injury. He was also part of the men's 4 × 100 m relay, though the team was disqualified in their first heat, and although scheduled to participate in the triple jump his injury forced him to retire before the event began. Four years later Gomes was reselected for Brazil when he competed in the 2012 Summer Paralympics in London. There he entered both the 100m and 200m T11 sprint events. He took bronze in the 100m and gold in the 200m.

In 2013, Gomes again represented Brazil when he attended the IPC Athletics World Championships in Lyon, France. There he entered the 100m sprint, finishing second to take the silver medal.

At the 2016 Summer Paralympics, Gomes earned a gold medal in the T11-13 4 × 100 m relay and silver medals in the T11 100m, T11 200m and T11 400m events. At the 2020 Summer Paralympics, he competed in the T11 100m and T11 400m events. At the 2024 Summer Paralympics, Gomes competed in the T11 100m and T11 400m events.
