= 2015 IPC Athletics World Championships – Men's 400 metres =

The men's 400 metres at the 2015 IPC Athletics World Championships was held at the Suheim Bin Hamad Stadium in Doha from 22–31 October.

== Medalists ==
Event	Gold		Silver		Bronze	
T11	Daniel Silva; Guide:Heitor de Oliveira Sales; Brazil	50.95 SB	Gerard Descarrega Puigdevall; Guide:Marcos Blanquino Exposito; Spain	51.28 AR	Timothee Adolphe; Guide:Fadil Bellaabouss; France	51.61
T12	Luis Goncalves; Portugal	49.67 SB	Sun Qichao; China	50.23	Hilton Langenhoven; South Africa	50.85
T13	Mohamed Amguoun; Morocco	47.83 WR	Egor Sharov; Russia	48.42 AR	Nambala Johannes; Namibia	48.68 SB
T20	Daniel Martins; Brazil	48.27 PB	Deliber Rodriguez Ramirez; Spain	49.62 PB	Artem Muratov; Russia	49.96
T34	Walid Ktila; Tunisia	52.83	Henry Manni; Finland	53.68	Mohamed Hammadi; United Arab Emirates	54.18
T36	Evgenii Shvetcov; Russia	53.70 CR	Paul Blake; Great Britain	54.58 SB	Roman Pavlyk; Ukraine	54.60 PB
T37	Andrey Vdovin; Russia	50.99 CR	Charl du Toit; South Africa	51.74 AR	Wu Jialong; China	53.44 AR
T38	Dixon de Jesus Hooker Velasquez; Colombia	52.62 CR	Union Sekailwe; South Africa	52.78 SB	Shaun Burrows; Great Britain	53.45 PB
T44	David Behre (T43); Germany	48.42 CR	Hunter Woodhall (T43); United States	49.05 PB	Johannes Floors (T43); Germany	49.94
T47	Jaquvis Hart; United States	48.17 CR	Shane Hudson; Jamaica	48.89 PB	Alexey Kotlov; Russia	48.92 PB
T51	Peter Genyn; Belgium	1:22.66 CR	Edgar Cesareo Navarro Sanchez; Mexico	1:24.46	Toni Piispanen; Finland	1:28.25
T52	Tomoki Sato; Japan	1:00.91	Hirokazu Ueyonabaru; Japan	1:03.58	Pichaya Kurattanasiri; Thailand	1:03.60
T53	Li Huzhao; China	49.32 PB	Brent Lakatos; Canada	49.45	Pongsakorn Paeyo; Thailand	50.42
T54	Liu Yang; China	46.46 CR	Liu Chengming; China	46.52 PB	Kenny van Weeghel; Netherlands	47.05
WR world record | AR area record | CR championship record | GR games record | NR national record | OR Olympic record | PB personal best | SB season best | WL world leading (in a given season)

== See also ==
- List of IPC world records in athletics
