= Mohamed Fouad Hamoumou =

Algerian Paralympic athlete

Sport
- Country: Algeria
- Sport: Para-athletics
- Disability: Vision impairment
- Disability class: T13
- Event: 400 metres
Medal record
Paralympic Games
Bronze medal – third place	2016 Rio de Janeiro	400 metres T13
World Championships
Bronze medal – third place	2017 London	400 metres T13

Mohamed Fouad Hamoumou is a visually impaired Algerian Paralympic athlete competing in T13-classification events. He represented Algeria at the 2016 Summer Paralympics in Rio de Janeiro, Brazil and he won the bronze medal in the men's 400 metres T13 event.

At the 2017 World Para Athletics Championships held in London, United Kingdom he won the bronze medal in the men's 400 metres T13 event.

At the 2018 World Para Athletics Tunis Grand Prix held in Tunis, Tunisia he won the gold medal in the men's 400 metres T13 event.
