= Athletics at the 2024 Summer Paralympics – Women's 100 metres T11 =

Women's 100 metres T11 at the XVII Paralympic Games
- Venue: Stade de France
- Dates: 2 September 2024 (heats & semi-finals); 3 September 2024 (final)
- Competitors: 16 from 13 nations
- Winning time: 11.83

Medalists
1st place, gold medalist(s)		Jerusa Geber dos Santos; Guide: Gabriel Aparecido Santos	Brazil
2nd place, silver medalist(s)		Liu Cuiqing; Guide: Chen Shengming	China
3rd place, bronze medalist(s)		Lorena Spoladore; Guide: Renato Costa	Brazil

100 metres at the 2024 Summer Paralympics
Men · T11 · T12 · T13 · T34 · T35 · T36 · T37 · T38 · T44 · T47 · T51 · T52 · T53 · T54 · T63 · T64
Women · T11 · T12 · T13 · T34 · T35 · T36 · T37 · T38 · T47 · T53 · T54 · T63 · T64

The women's 100 metres T11 event at the 2024 Summer Paralympics in Paris, took place between 2 and 3 September 2024.

The T11 category is for athletes with a visual impairment. A T11 athlete may be entirely without sight, or be able to perceive light, but have no ability to see the shape of a hand at any distance. T11 athletes commonly run with guides.

== Records ==
Prior to the competition, the existing records were as follows:

World Record	Jerusa Geber dos Santos (BRA)	11.83	(Brazil) São Paulo	25 March 2023
Paralympic Record	Libby Clegg (GBR)	11.91	(Brazil) Rio de Janeiro	9 September 2016

Area	Time		Athlete	Location	Date
Africa	12.39		(Namibia) Lahja Ishitile	(Japan) Kobe	20 May 2024
America	11.83	WR	(Brazil) Jerusa Geber dos Santos	(Brazil) São Paulo	25 March 2023
Asia	11.91		(China) Zhou Guohua	(Switzerland) Nottwil	27 May 2023
Europe	11.91	PR	(United Kingdom) Libby Clegg	(Brazil) Rio de Janeiro	9 September 2016
Oceania	14.42		(Australia) Karlee Symonds	South Australia	17 April 2021

== Results ==
=== Round 1 ===
4 heats start on 2 September 2024 with the first in each heat (Q) and the next 4 fastest (q) advance to the semi-finals.

==== Heat 1 ====
Rank	Lane	Athlete	Nation	Time	Notes
1	5	Lorena Spoladore; Guide: Renato Costa	Brazil	12.11	Q, SB
2	1	Lahja Ishitile; Guide: Sem Shimanda	Namibia	12.12	q, AR
3	3	Asila Mirzayorova; Guide: Abduvokhid Mirzayorov	Uzbekistan	13.08	PB
4	7	Rosario Coppola; Guide: Juan Jasid	Argentina	14.05	PB
Source:				Wind: +0.7 m/s	

==== Heat 2 ====
Rank	Lane	Athlete	Nation	Time	Notes
1	3	Jerusa Geber dos Santos; Guide: Gabriel Aparecido Santos	Brazil	12.57	Q
2	5	Alba García Falagán; Guide: Diego Folgado	Spain	12.90	SB
3	7	Arjola Dedaj; Guide: Alessandro Galbiati	Italy	13.13	
Source:				Wind: +0.5 m/s	

==== Heat 3 ====
Rank	Lane	Athlete	Nation	Time	Notes
1	5	Zhou Guohau; Guide: Gu Dengpu	China	12.28	Q, SB
2	3	Juliana Moko; Guide: Abraao Sapalo	Angola	12.51	q, PB
3	7	Jhulia Dos Santos; Guide: Patrick Souza	Brazil	12.56	q
–	1	Na Brinbamde Domingas; Guide: Kilsman Semedo	Guinea-Bissau	DQ	R19.4
Source:				Wind: +0.1 m/s	

==== Heat 4 ====
Rank	Lane	Athlete	Nation	Time	Notes
1	7	Liu Cuiqing; Guide: Chen Shengming	China	12.15	Q
2	3	Linda Patricia Pérez López; Guide: Álvaro Cassiani	Venezuela	12.24	q, SB
3	5	Fathimath Ibrahim	Maldives	17.10	PB
–	1	Delya Boulaghlem; Guide: Harold Achi-Yao	France	DQ	R19.4
Source:				Wind: -0.3 m/s	

=== Semi-finals ===
First in each heat (Q) and the next 2 fastest (q) advance to the Final.

==== Heat 1 ====
Rank	Lane	Athlete	Nation	Time	Notes
1	5	Lorena Spoladore; Guide: Renato Costa	Brazil	12.07	Q, SB
2	7	Lahja Ishitile; Guide: Sem Shimanda	Namibia	12.19	
3	3	Zhou Guohau; Guide: Gu Dengpu	China	12.25	SB
4	1	Juliana Moko; Guide: Abraao Sapalo	Angola	12.56	
Source:				Wind: 0.0 m/s	

==== Heat 2 ====
Rank	Lane	Athlete	Nation	Time	Notes
1	3	Jerusa Geber dos Santos; Guide: Gabriel Aparecido Santos	Brazil	11.80	Q, WR
2	5	Liu Cuiqing; Guide: Chen Shengming	China	12.06	q
3	7	Linda Patricia Pérez López; Guide: Álvaro Cassiani	Venezuela	12.19	q, SB
4	1	Jhulia Dos Santos; Guide: Patrick Souza	Brazil	12.58	
Source:				Wind: +0.2 m/s	

=== Final ===
The final will take place on 3 September 2024:

Rank	Lane	Athlete	Nation	Time	Notes
1st place, gold medalist(s)	3	Jerusa Geber dos Santos; Guide: Gabriel Aparecido Santos	Brazil	11.83	
2nd place, silver medalist(s)	7	Liu Cuiqing; Guide: Chen Shengming	China	12.04	
3rd place, bronze medalist(s)	5	Lorena Spoladore; Guide: Renato Costa	Brazil	12.14	
4	1	Linda Patricia Pérez López; Guide: Álvaro Cassiani	Venezuela	12.27	
Source:				Wind: -0.1 m/s	
