= Namibia at the 2004 Summer Paralympics =

- IPC code: NAM
- NPC: Namibia National Paralympic Committee

in Athens
- Competitors: 1 in 1 sport
- Flag bearer: Ruben Soroseb
- Medals Ranked 76th: Gold 0 Silver 0 Bronze 0 Total 0

Summer Paralympics appearances (overview)
- 1992; 1996–2000; 2004; 2008; 2012; 2016; 2020; 2024

Namibia competed at the 2004 Summer Paralympics in Athens, Greece. The team included one athlete, but won no medals.

== Sports ==
=== Powerlifting ===
Athlete	Event	Result	Rank
Ruben Soroseb	82.5kg	140.0	15

== See also ==
- Namibia at the Paralympics
- Namibia at the 2004 Summer Olympics
