= Namibia at the 2016 Summer Paralympics =

- IPC code: NAM
- NPC: Namibia National Paralympic Committee

in Rio de Janeiro
- Competitors: 10 in 3 sports
- Flag bearer: Johanna Benson
- Medals Ranked 53rd: Gold 1 Silver 2 Bronze 2 Total 5

Summer Paralympics appearances (overview)
- 1992; 1996–2000; 2004; 2008; 2012; 2016; 2020; 2024

Namibia competed at the 2016 Summer Paralympics in Rio de Janeiro, Brazil, from 7 September to 18 September 2016.

== The Team ==
Prior to the team leaving for Rio, they visited the Namibia Sport Commission. The team departed for Rio on August 29. The team included 9 athletes, 4 guides and 7 officials. The team's Chef de Mission was Nicklaus Nghumoono. The team manager was Iitwayi Johannes. The team administrator was Memory Kahlari. The flag bearer was sprinter and long-jumper Johanna Benson. Benson won the country's first Paralympic gold and silver medal.

== Funding and support ==
The Ministry of Sport, Youth and National Service in Namibia was expected to fund several intensive training camps in preparation for Rio. The Paralympic movement in the country is largely dependent on the government for financial and other support, as the private sector has not contributed much to Paralympic sportspeople's efforts. Additional private funding for the national team came from Coca-Cola, Seaflower and Miss Namibia 2015. Athlete Ananias Shikongo raised funds through a personal crowd funding campaign to finance his preparation.

Promotional events to support Paralympic efforts were scheduled to take place around the country in the lead up to Rio.

== Disability classifications ==
Every participant at the Paralympics has their disability grouped into one of five disability categories; amputation, the condition may be congenital or sustained through injury or illness; cerebral palsy; wheelchair athletes, there is often overlap between this and other categories; visual impairment, including blindness; Les autres, any physical disability that does not fall strictly under one of the other categories, for example dwarfism or multiple sclerosis. Each Paralympic sport then has its own classifications, dependent upon the specific physical demands of competition. Events are given a code, made of numbers and letters, describing the type of event and classification of the athletes competing. Some sports, such as athletics, divide athletes by both the category and severity of their disabilities, other sports, for example swimming, group competitors from different categories together, the only separation being based on the severity of the disability.

== Medallists ==
Namibia finished seventh among all African countries on the gold medal table with 1 gold. They had 2 silvers and 2 bronzes to finish with 5 total medals.

Medal	Name	Sport	Event	Date
Gold	Ananias Shikongo (Guide – Even Tjiviju)	Athletics	Men's 200 m T11	15 September
Silver	Johannes Nambala	Athletics	Men's 100 m T13	9 September
Silver	Johannes Nambala	Athletics	Men's 400 m T13	15 September
Bronze	Ananias Shikongo (Guide – Even Tjiviju)	Athletics	Men's 100 m T11	11 September
Bronze	Ananias Shikongo (Guide – Sam Shimanda)	Athletics	Men's 400 m T11	17 September

== Athletics ==
One of the major target sports for Namibia to qualify for the Rio Paralympics was athletics. Athletes prepped for qualification and potential inclusion on the 2016 Games team by competing in the 2015 All African Games. Athletes the expected by Namibia Paralympics Committee to qualify for Rio included Lahja Ishitile, a bronze medalist at the 2014 Commonwealth Games, Johannes Nambala, who won a gold medal in the men's T13 400m at the 2013 IPC Athletics World Championships, and visually impaired short-distance runner Ananias Shikongo.

Lahja Ishitile, Johannes Nambala, Elias Ndimulunde, Rosa Manjoro, Ananias Shikongo, Reginald Benade, and Martin Aloysius all attended the 2015 All African Games and the 2015 IPC Athletics World Championships as part of Rio qualification efforts.

Johanna Benson was a member of the Rio team, scheduled to compete in the T37 100m, 400m and long jump events. Benson had won her country's first ever Paralympic gold medal at the 2012 Summer Paralympics. Johannes Nambala was selected for the team after becoming the world champion in the T13 200m event. Ananias Shikongo was also selected for the Rio Games. He won 3 gold medals at the All African Games. Lahja Ishitile was selected to Rio after having medaled at the 2014 Commonwealth Games. Martin Aloysius was selected to compete in the T12 400 meters. Elias Ndimulunde was scheduled to compete in the T46 100m and 400m events. Moses Tobias was scheduled to compete in the T11 100m and 400m events. The guides for athletics included Sam Shimanda, David Ndeilenge, Even Tjiviju and Andre Oberholster. The Rio team was coached by Michael Hamukwaya, with Ivon Perez serving as the assistant coach.

Men
Track

Athlete	Events	Heat		Semifinal		Final	
Athlete	Events	Time	Rank	Time	Rank	Time	Rank
Ananias Shikongo (Guide – Even Tjiviju) (Guide – Sam Shimanda)	100 m T11	11.17	1 Q	11.23	1 Q	11.11	3rd place, bronze medalist(s)
Ananias Shikongo (Guide – Even Tjiviju) (Guide – Sam Shimanda)	200 m T11	22.93	1 Q	22.48	1 Q	22.44	1st place, gold medalist(s)
Ananias Shikongo (Guide – Even Tjiviju) (Guide – Sam Shimanda)	400 m T11	50.85	2 Q	—N/a		50.63	3rd place, bronze medalist(s)
Johannes Nambala	100 m T13	10.81	2 Q	—N/a		10.78	2nd place, silver medalist(s)
Johannes Nambala	400 m T13	49.01	2 Q	—N/a		47.21	2nd place, silver medalist(s)
Elias Ndimulunde	100 m T45-47	12.68	7	—N/a		Did not advance	
Elias Ndimulunde	400 m T45-47	DNS		Did not advance			
Martin Aloisius	400 m T12	Disqualified		Did not advance			
Moses Tobias (Guide - Andre Oberholster)	200 m T11	24.17	4	Did not advance			
Moses Tobias (Guide - Andre Oberholster); Martin Aloisius; Johannes Nambala; Ananias Shikongo (Guide – Even Tjiviju)	4 × 100 m T11-13	43.49	2 Q	—N/a		43.66	4

Field

Athlete	Events	Result	Rank
Martin Aloisius	Long Jump F12	6.38	11

Women
Track

Athlete	Events	Heat		Semifinal		Final	
Athlete	Events	Time	Rank	Time	Rank	Time	Rank
Lahja Ishitile (Guide – David Ndeilenga) (Guide – Sam Shimanda)	100 m T11	12.59	2 Q	12.56	4	Did not advance	
Lahja Ishitile (Guide – David Ndeilenga) (Guide – Sam Shimanda)	200 m T11	25,61	2 Q	25,37	3	Did not advance	
Lahja Ishitile (Guide – David Ndeilenga) (Guide – Sam Shimanda)	400 m T11	58.97	2	—N/a		Did not advance	
Johanna Benson	100 m T37	14.23	3 Q	—N/a		14.16	7
Johanna Benson	400 m T37	1:10.79	4 q	—N/a		1:12.35	8

Field

Athlete	Events	Result	Rank
Johanna Benson	Long Jump T37	3.61 m	6

== Powerlifting ==
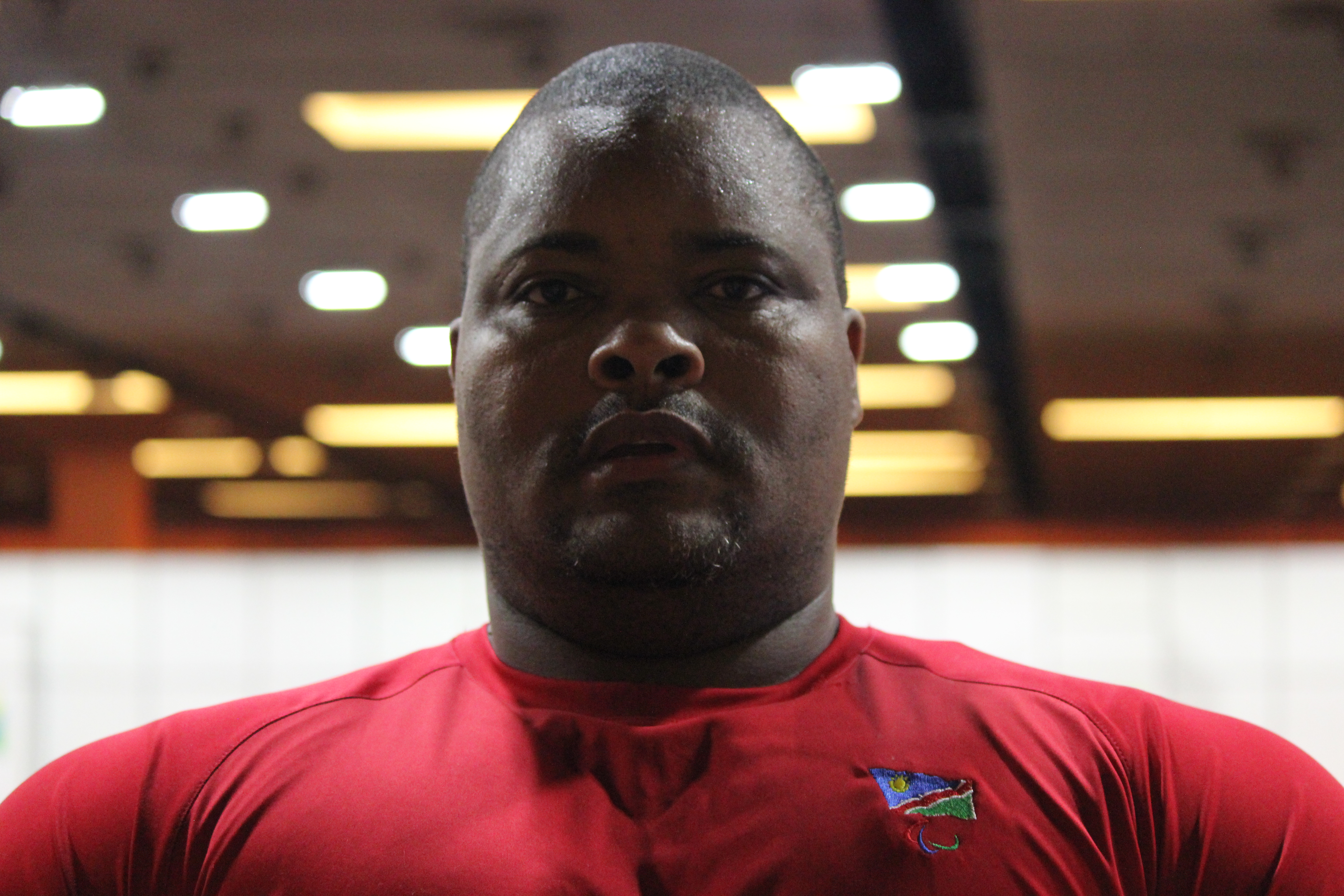
Ruben Soroseb

Ruben Soroseb was part of the Namibia delegation in Rio, competing in powerlifting. The national team coach was Ndamian Ndengu.

Athlete	Events	Result	Rank
Ruben Soroseb	Weight class -107kg	190 kg	9

== Swimming ==
Gideon Nasilowski was part of the Namibia delegation in Rio, competing in swimming. The swimming team manager was Sonia Lindemeier.

Athlete	Events	Heats		Final	
Athlete	Events	Time	Rank	Time	Rank
Gideon Nasilowski	50 m Freestyle S3	1:38.21	11	Did not advance	

== See also ==
- Namibia at the 2016 Summer Olympics
