= Athletics at the 2024 Summer Paralympics – Men's 100 metres T37 =

Men's 100 metres T37 at the XVII Paralympic Games
- Venue: Stade de France
- Dates: 30 August 2024
- Competitors: 11 from 8 nations
- Winning time: 11.07

Medalists
1st place, gold medalist(s)		Ricardo Gomes de Mendonça	Brazil
2nd place, silver medalist(s)		Saptoyogo Purnomo	Indonesia
3rd place, bronze medalist(s)		Andrey Vdovin	Neutral Paralympic Athletes

100 metres at the 2024 Summer Paralympics
Men · T11 · T12 · T13 · T34 · T35 · T36 · T37 · T38 · T44 · T47 · T51 · T52 · T53 · T54 · T63 · T64
Women · T11 · T12 · T13 · T34 · T35 · T36 · T37 · T38 · T47 · T53 · T54 · T63 · T64

The men's 100 metres T37 event at the 2024 Summer Paralympics in Paris, took place on 30 August 2024.

The T37 category is for ambulant athletes with cerebral palsy. These athletes have movement and coordination problems on one half of their body. They have good ability in their dominant side of their body (ie hemiplegia).

== Records ==
Prior to the competition, the existing records were as follows:

World Record	Nick Mayhugh (USA)	10.95	(Japan) Tokyo	27 August 2021
Paralympic Record	Nick Mayhugh (USA)	10.95	(Japan) Tokyo	27 August 2021

Area	Time		Athlete	Location	Date
Africa	11.42		(South Africa) Charl du Toit	(Brazil) Rio de Janeiro	10 September 2016
America	10.95	WR	(United States) Nick Mayhugh	(Japan) Tokyo	27 August 2021
Asia	11.27		(Indonesia) Saptoyogo Purnomo	(France) Paris	10 July 2023
Europe	11.18		Andrey Vdovin	(Japan) Tokyo	27 August 2021
Oceania	12.08		(New Zealand) Joseph Smith	(France) Paris	9 July 2023

== Results ==
=== Round 1 ===
2 heats start on 30 August 2024. The first 2 athletes in each heat (Q) and the next 8 fastest (q) qualified to the finals.

==== Heat 1 ====
Rank	Lane	Athlete	Nation	Time	Notes
1	3	Ricardo Gomes de Mendonça	Brazil	11.07	Q, SB
2	4	Mykola Raiskyi	Ukraine	11.35	Q, SB
3	5	Christian Gabriel	Brazil	11.38	Q, SB
4	6	Saptoyogo Purnomo	Indonesia	11.75	q, PB
5	7	Valentin Bertrand	France	12.46	
				Wind: +1.1 m/s	

==== Heat 2 ====
Rank	Lane	Athlete	Nation	Time	Notes
1	3	Ali Alnakhli	Saudi Arabia	11.33	Q
2	4	Andrey Vdovin	Neutral Paralympic Athletes	11.57	Q
3	5	Edson Pinheiro	Brazil	11.60	Q, SB
4	6	Vladyslav Zahrebelnyi	Ukraine	11.72	q, SB
5	7	Petrus Karuli	Namibia	12.74	
6	8	Andrés Malambo	Colombia	13.77	
				Wind: +1.3 m/s	

=== Final ===
Final starts on 30 August 2024.

Rank	Lane	Athlete	Nation	Time	Notes
1st place, gold medalist(s)	6	Ricardo Gomes de Mendonça	Brazil	11.07	=SB
2nd place, silver medalist(s)	5	Saptoyogo Purnomo	Indonesia	11.26	AR
3rd place, bronze medalist(s)	7	Andrey Vdovin	Neutral Paralympic Athletes	11.41	SB
4	3	Christian Gabriel	Brazil	11.45	
5	4	Edson Pinheiro	Brazil	11.47	
6	8	Ali Alnakhli	Saudi Arabia	11.58	SB
7	2	Vladyslav Zahrebelnyi	Ukraine	11.84	
8	9	Mykola Raiskyi	Ukraine	11.94	
				Wind: +0.7 m/s	
