= Gerard Descarrega =

Spanish Paralympic athlete

Personal information
- Full name: Gerard Descarrega Puigdevall
- Nationality: Spanish
- Born: 2 May 1994 (age 32) La Selva del Camp, Tarragona

Sport
- Country: Spain
- Sport: Track and field (T12)
Medal record
Men's para athletics
Representing Spain
Paralympic Games
Gold medal – first place	2016 Rio	400 m - T11
Gold medal – first place	2020 Tokyo	400 m - T11
World Championships
Silver medal – second place	2015 Doha	400 m - T11
Silver medal – second place	2023 Paris	400 m - T11
Bronze medal – third place	2015 Doha	4x100 m relay - T11-13
European Championships
Bronze medal – third place	2012 Stadskanaal	400m T12
Bronze medal – third place	2014 Swansea	4x100 m relay - T11-13

Gerard Descarrega Puigdevall (born 2 May 1994 in La Selva del Camp, Tarragona) is a Paralympic athlete from Spain competing mainly in category T11. He has a visual impairment, and has represented Spain at the 2012 Summer Paralympics.

== Personal ==
Descarrega was born on 2 May 1994 in Reus, Tarragona. He has a visual impairment. In December 2013, he attended an event marking Spanish insurance company Santa Lucía Seguros becoming a sponsor of the Spanish Paralympic Committee, and consequently Plan ADOP which funds high performance Spanish disability sport competitors. He chose to attend the event because he wanted to show support for this type of sponsorship. In December 2013, he participated in an event related to Spain's constitution day at the Municipal Sports Centre Moratalaz in Madrid.

== Athletics ==
Descarrega is a Paralympic athlete from Spain competing mainly in category T11.

The 2011 Spanish National Adaptive Athletics Championships were held in Valencia and Descarrega competed in them. He competed at the 2011 IPC World Athletics Championships in Christchurch, New Zealand where he finished third in the 400 meter race. He also competed in the men's visually impaired 4x100 meter relay with Xavier Porras (T11), Martín Parejo Maza (T11), and Maximiliano Óscar Rodríguez Magi (T12) who finished in Spanish record national time of 45.45 seconds while earning a bronze medal in the event. In 2012, he was a recipient of a Plan ADO €18,000 athlete scholarship with a €3,000 reserve and a €2,500 coaching scholarship. Prior to the start of the London Games, he trained with several other visually impaired Spanish track and field athletes in Logroño. He competed in the 2012 Summer Paralympics in London, England where he finished fourth in the 400 meter race. He failed to make the finals in the 100 meters. In July 2013, he participated in the 2013 IPC Athletics World Championships. He was a member of the men's 4x100 meter relay team along with Maxi Rodríguez, Xavi Porras and Martín Parejo Maza. The team qualified for the final after setting the best time in their semi-final race.
