= Athletics at the 2024 Summer Paralympics – Women's 400 metres T11 =

Women's 400 metres T11 at the XVII Paralympic Games
- Venue: Stade de France
- Dates: 30 August 2024 (heats & semi-finals); 31 August 2024 (final)
- Competitors: 13 from 9 nations
- Winning time: 56.20

Medalists
1st place, gold medalist(s)		Lahja Ishitile	Namibia
2nd place, silver medalist(s)		Thalita Simplício	Brazil
3rd place, bronze medalist(s)		He Shanshan	China

400 metres at the 2024 Summer Paralympics
Men · T11 · T12 · T13 · T20 · T36 · T37 · T38 · T47 · T52 · T53 · T54 · T62
Women · T11 · T12 · T13 · T20 · T37 · T38 · T47 · T53 · T54 ·

The women's 400 metres T11 event at the 2024 Summer Paralympics in Paris, will take place on 30 August 2024.

The T11 category is for athletes with a visual impairment. A T11 athlete may be entirely without sight, or be able to perceive light, but have no ability to see the shape of a hand at any distance. T11 athletes commonly run with guides.

== Records ==
Prior to the competition, the existing records were as follows:

World Record	Jerusa Geber dos Santos (BRA)	11.83	(Brazil) São Paulo	25 March 2023
Paralympic Record	Libby Clegg (GBR)	11.91	(Brazil) Rio de Janeiro	9 September 2016

Area	Time		Athlete	Location	Date
Africa	12.39		(Namibia) Lahja Ishitile	(Japan) Kobe	20 May 2024
America	11.83	WR	(Brazil) Jerusa Geber dos Santos	(Brazil) São Paulo	25 March 2023
Asia	11.91		(China) Zhou Guohua	(Switzerland) Nottwil	27 May 2023
Europe	11.91	PR	(United Kingdom) Libby Clegg	(Brazil) Rio de Janeiro	9 September 2016
Oceania	14.42		(Australia) Karlee Symonds	South Australia	17 April 2021

== Results ==
=== Round 1 ===
4 heats start on 30 August 2024. First in each heat (Q) and the next 4 fastest (q) advance to the Semi-finals.

==== Heat 1 ====
Rank	Lane	Athlete	Nation	Time	Notes
1	1	Liu Cuiqing; Guide: Chen Shengming	China	59.09	Q
2	3	Juliana Moko; Guide: Abraao Sapalo	Angola	1:03.78	q, SB
3	7	Camila Müller; Guide: Vinicius Martins	Brazil	1:05.47	PB
—	5	Angie Pabón; Guide: Luis Arizala	Colombia	DNS	

==== Heat 2 ====
Rank	Lane	Athlete	Nation	Time	Notes
1	5	Lahja Ishitile; Guide: Sem Shimanda	Namibia	57.73	Q
2	3	He Shanshan; Guide: You Junjie	China	58.86	q, PB
—	7	Asila Mirzayorova; Guide: Abduvokhid Mirzayorov	Uzbekistan	DQ	R7.9.5

==== Heat 3 ====
Rank	Lane	Athlete	Nation	Time	Notes
1	3	Thalita Simplício; Guide: Felipe Veloso	Brazil	58.96	Q
2	7	Suneeporn Tanomwong; Guide: Chaiwat Thongjamroon	Thailand	1:02.95	q
3	5	Joanna Mazur; Guide: Michał Stawicki	Poland	1:04.01	q

==== Heat 4 ====
Rank	Lane	Athlete	Nation	Time	Notes
1	5	Ionis Salcedo; Guide: Niver Rangel	Colombia	1:00.03	Q
2	3	Irene Suárez; Guide: Victor Méndez	Venezuela	1:08.25	
—	7	Jhulia Dos Santos; Guide: Patrick Souza	Brazil	DQ	R7.10.4

=== Semi-finals ===
Two semi-final heats took place on 30 August 2024. First in each heat (Q) and the next 2 fastest (q) advanced to the Final.

==== Heat 1 ====
Rank	Lane	Athlete	Nation	Time	Notes
1	3	Lahja Ishitile; Guide: Sem Shimanda	Namibia	57.74	Q
2	7	He Shanshan; Guide: You Junjie	China	58.82	q, PB
3	5	Ionis Salcedo; Guide: Niver Rangel	Colombia	59.72	q
4	1	Joanna Mazur; Guide: Michał Stawicki	Poland	1:03.93	

==== Heat 2 ====
Rank	Lane	Athlete	Nation	Time	Notes
1	5	Thalita Simplício; Guide: Felipe Veloso	Brazil	58.56	Q
2	3	Liu Cuiqing; Guide: Chen Shengming	China	1:00.13	
3	1	Juliana Moko; Guide: Abraao Sapalo	Angola	1:01.69	PB
4	7	Suneeporn Tanomwong; Guide: Chaiwat Thongjamroon	Thailand	1:03.19	

=== Final ===
The Final took place on 31 August 2024.

Rank	Lane	Athlete	Nation	Time	Notes
1st place, gold medalist(s)	3	Lahja Ishitile; Guide: Sem Shimanda	Namibia	56.20	PB, AR
2nd place, silver medalist(s)	5	Thalita Simplício; Guide: Felipe Veloso	Brazil	57.21	SB
3rd place, bronze medalist(s)	7	He Shanshan; Guide: You Junjie	China	58.25	PB
4	1	Ionis Salcedo; Guide: Niver Rangel	Colombia	1:00.15	
