= Christian Gabriel =

Romanian-German chess grandmaster (born 1975)

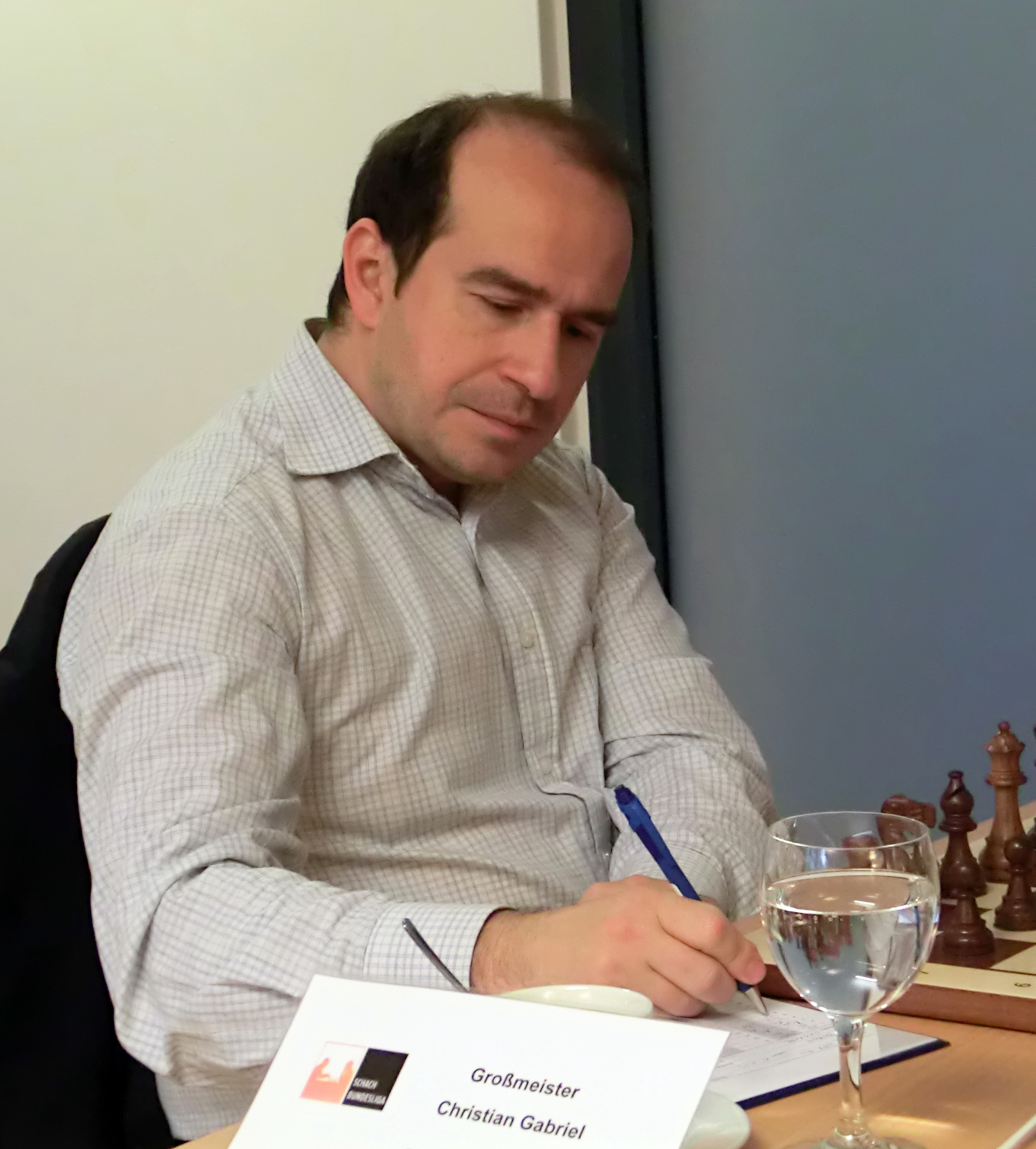
- Christian Gabriel in 2013

Personal information
- Born: 3 March 1975 (age 51) Reșița, Romania

Chess career
- Country: Romania (until 1988); Germany (since 1988)
- Title: Grandmaster (1996)
- FIDE rating: 2498 (July 2026)
- Peak rating: 2581 (January 1999)

Christian Gabriel (born 3 March 1975) is a Romanian-German chess Grandmaster (GM) (1996), two-times European Team Chess Championships bronze medalist (1997, 1999).

== Biography ==
Christian Gabriel has participated in chess tournaments from the age of seven. In 1987, he won the Romanian Youth Chess Championship in U14 age group. In the same year his family moved to Germany. Christian Gabriel was soon promoted to the group of the best German juniors and seven times (in 1989-1995) representing his country at the World Youth Chess Championship in various age categories. In 1989, in Aguadilla Christian Gabriel won bronze medal in World Youth Chess Championship in U14 age group, behind only to the later World Chess Champions Veselin Topalov and Vladimir Kramnik. He was also a two-time medalist in European Youth Chess Championship: silver in 1988 (in Saltsjöbaden) and bronze in 1991 (in Mamaia).

At the end of the 1990s Christian Gabriel was one of leading German chess players. In 1998, in Bremen he won bronze medal in German Chess Championship.

Christian Gabriel successes in international chess tournaments include:

- 1st place in Budapest (1996, tournament Elekes),
- shared 1st place in Bad Homburg (1996, together with Boris Alterman),
- shared 1st place in Makarska (1996).

Christian Gabriel played for Germany in the Chess Olympiad:

- In 1998, at first reserve board in the 33rd Chess Olympiad in Elista (+1, =5, -0).

Christian Gabriel played for Germany in the European Team Chess Championships:

- In 1997, at fourth board in the 11th European Team Chess Championship in Pula (+3, =5, -0) and won individual bronze medal,
- In 1999, at first reserve board in the 12th European Team Chess Championship in Batumi (+2, =5, -0) and won team bronze medal.

In 1992, Christian Gabriel was awarded the FIDE International Master (IM) title and received the FIDE Grandmaster (GM) title four years later. In 2000, he appeared in the World Chess Championship qualifying Zonal tournament, and then ended his professional career, in the following years only appearing in team competitions in Germany and Switzerland.

== Other achievements ==
Christian Gabriel graduated in law from University of Konstanz. He works in Nuremberg as a financial specialist. In addition to playing classic chess, he also achieved successes in so-called Janus Chess (played on 80 field chessboard). In this variety he won the title of vice-champion of Europe. He is also the owner of black belt in taekwondo.
