= Chris Kinda =

Namibian para-athlete (born 1999)

Personal information
- Nationality: Namibian
- Born: 9 February 1999 (age 27) Usakos, Namibia
- Home town: Windhoek, Namibia

Sport
- Country: Namibia
- Sport: Para-athletics
- Disability class: T11
- Event: Sprint
Medal record
Men's para-athletics
Representing Namibia
World Championships
Gold medal – first place	2024 Kobe	400 m T11

Chris Kinda (born 9 February 1999) is a para-athlete from Namibia competing mainly in category T11 sprint events. He won the gold medal in the 400 metres in 52.35 seconds at the 2024 World Para Athletics Championships in Kobe, Japan, with accompanying runner Riwaldo Goagoseb.

Kinda is qualified to participate in the 2024 Summer Paralympics in Paris.
