= Di Dongdong =

Chinese para-athlete (born 1993)

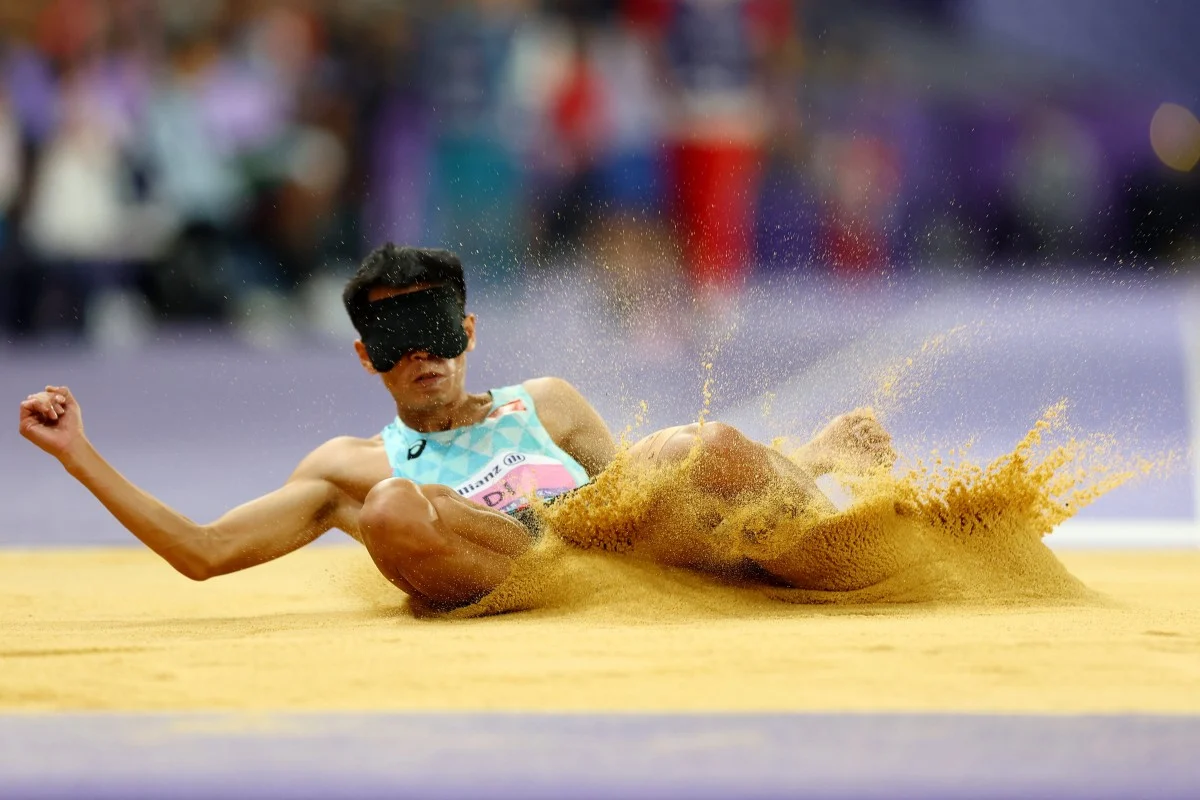
- Di at the 2024 Summer Paralympics

Personal information
- Born: 29 December 1993 (age 32) Liaoyang, China

Sport
- Country: China
- Sport: Paralympic athletics
- Disability class: T11
Medal record
Paralympic athletics
Representing China
Paralympic Games
Gold medal – first place	2020 Tokyo	Long jump T11
Silver medal – second place	2016 Rio	4×100 m relay T11-13
Bronze medal – third place	2020 Tokyo	100 m T11
Bronze medal – third place	2024 Paris	100 m T11
World Championships
Gold medal – first place	2017 London	4×100 m relay T11-13
Gold medal – first place	2023 Paris	Long jump T11
Gold medal – first place	2024 Kobe	100 m T11
Gold medal – first place	2025 New Delhi	Long jump T11
Silver medal – second place	2017 London	400 m T11
Silver medal – second place	2024 Kobe	Long jump T11
Bronze medal – third place	2015 Doha	100 m T11
Bronze medal – third place	2017 London	100 m T11
Bronze medal – third place	2017 London	200 m T11
Bronze medal – third place	2019 Dubai	Long jump T11
Bronze medal – third place	2025 New Delhi	100 m T11
Asian Para Games
Gold medal – first place	2018 Jakarta	200 m T11
Gold medal – first place	2018 Jakarta	400 m T11
Gold medal – first place	2018 Jakarta	Long jump T11
Gold medal – first place	2022 Hangzhou	100 m T11
Gold medal – first place	2022 Hangzhou	Long jump T11
Bronze medal – third place	2018 Jakarta	100 m T11

Di Dongdong (born 29 December 1993) is a Chinese para-athlete, who won gold in the long jump T11 event at the 2020 Summer Paralympics.

He won the gold medal in the men's long jump T11 event at the 2023 World Para Athletics Championships held in Paris, France.
