= Johanna Benson =

Namibian Paralympic athlete (born 1990)

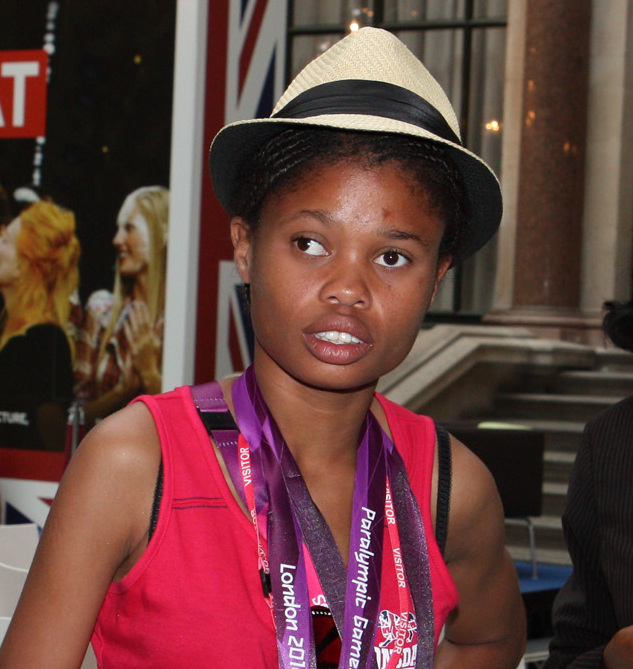

Personal information
- Nationality: Namibian
- Born: 17 February 1990 (age 36) Walvis Bay, South West Africa (now Walvis Bay, Namibia)
- Height: 165 cm (5 ft 5 in)

Sport
- Country: Namibia
- Sport: Athletics
- Disability class: T37
- Events: Sprint; Long jump
- Club: Welwitschia Paralympic Sport Club
- Coached by: Michael Hamukwaya

Achievements and titles
- Paralympic finals: 2012 London; 2016 Rio de Janeiro
Medal record
Women's athletics
Representing Namibia
Paralympic Games
Gold medal – first place	2012 London	Women's 200m T37
Silver medal – second place	2012 London	Women's 100m T37
IPC Athletics World Championships
Bronze medal – third place	2013 Lyon	100m T37
Bronze medal – third place	2013 Lyon	200m T37
Bronze medal – third place	2015 Doha	200m T37
Commonwealth Games
Bronze medal – third place	2010 Delhi	100 m T37
Bronze medal – third place	2014 Glasgow	long jump T37/38
African Games
Gold medal – first place	2015 Brazzaville	100m T37

Johanna Benson (born 17 February 1990) is a Paralympian athlete from Walvis Bay, Namibia. She competes in T37 long jump and sprint events and at the 2012 Summer Paralympics in London she won the women's 200 metres race in her classification. Her 200 metres success in London made her the first Paralympic gold medalist in Namibia's history.

== Personal history ==
Benson was born in Walvis Bay, South West Africa (now Namibia) in 1990. At the age of five months it was noticed that the left side of her body was not developing as expected and she was diagnosed with cerebral palsy. She was educated locally in Walvis Bay, attending the public primary and secondary schools.

== Athletics career ==
Benson came from a sporting family, with her mother being an athlete before her, and her uncle playing for the Namibia national football team. From a young age she enjoyed running and her talent was spotted when she attended Kuisebmond Secondary School.

Classified as a T37 competitor, for athletes with cerebral palsy, Benson's first major international event came in 2010 when she represented her country at the Commonwealth Games in Delhi. In Delhi she entered the women's 100 metres (T37), and her time of 14.81 saw her finish third to claim the bronze medal. The next year she travelled to Christchurch in New Zealand to compete at the 2011 IPC Athletics World Championships, but she was unable to find the same form as in India, and she failed to qualify through to the finals in both the 100 and 200 metre sprints.

Benson's crowning achievement's as an athlete came at the 2012 Summer Paralympics in London. Entering the team as Namibia's only female athlete, the 22 years old Benson won a gold medal in the Women's 200m T37 race, ahead of Oksana Krechunyak of Ukraine. Later in the Games Benson won silver in the Women's 100m T37. On her arrival back home she was given N$170 000 in cash for the medals, a house in Walvis Bay, and a diplomatic passport by the Government of Namibia. She further received money from private individuals, institutions, and organisations. Furthermore, she was given an offer for free trainings and physiotherapy for the next four years from an agency in her home town. Benson's achievements in London made her the first athlete from Namibia to win a Paralympic gold medal, and the first competitor to win gold across either Olympic or Paralympic Games. Namibia's Frankie Fredericks won several silver medals in 1992 and 1996.

Benson followed her Paralympic success with medals at World Championship level. At the 2013 IPC Athletics World Championships in Lyon she won two bronze medals, in the 100 and 200 metre races. A year later she competed at the 2014 Commonwealth Games in Glasgow. Although her sprint events were no longer part of the programme, the T37/38 long jump was introduced. In the long jump Benson managed a personal best distance of 3.82 metres to take the bronze medal, her only major international medal in this event.

In the buildup to the 2016 Summer Paralympics in Rio de Janeiro, Benson took part in two further international competitions. At the 2015 African Games in Brazzaville, she won gold in the T37, 100 metre sprint, though in a weak field. She also collected a third World Championship medal by winning a bronze at the 2015 Championships in Doha in the 200 metres (T37). At Rio Benson was given the honour of being her country's flag bearer during the opening ceremony. With Benson's favourite event, the 200 metres, withdrawn from the schedule, she entered the 100 metre and 400 metre sprint, and the long jump. Despite qualifying through to the finals in both races, she finished at the back of the field in both events. Her time of 14.16 in the 100 metre sprint was actually faster than her silver medal time from London, but the strength of the field had moved on significantly in the past four years and Benson finished in seventh place.
