= Daniel Silva (athlete) =

Brazilian Paralympic athlete

Personal information
- Full name: Daniel Mendes da Silva
- Born: 15 June 1979 (age 47) Nova Venécia, Brazil
- Height: 1.78 m (5 ft 10 in)

Sport
- Sport: Para athletics
- Disability class: T11
- Event: Sprint
Medal record
Men's para athletics
Representing Brazil
Paralympic Games
Gold medal – first place	2016 Rio de Janeiro	4 × 100 m T11–13
Silver medal – second place	2012 London	200 m T11
Bronze medal – third place	2016 Rio de Janeiro	200m T11
World Championships
Gold medal – first place	2013 Lyon	400m T11
Gold medal – first place	2015 Doha	400 m T11
Silver medal – second place	2011 Christchurch	200m T11
Silver medal – second place	2011 Christchurch	400m T11
Silver medal – second place	2019 Dubai	400m T11
Bronze medal – third place	2011 Christchurch	100 m T11
Bronze medal – third place	2013 Lyon	200m T11
Bronze medal – third place	2015 Doha	100 m T11
Parapan American Games
Gold medal – first place	2011 Guadalajara	400m T11
Gold medal – first place	2019 Lima	400m T11
Silver medal – second place	2011 Guadalajara	100m T11
Silver medal – second place	2011 Guadalajara	200m T11

Daniel Mendes da Silva (born 15 June 1979) is a Paralympic athlete from Brazil competing mainly in category T11 sprint events.

Daniel competed in his first Paralympic Games in 2008 Paralympic Games where he won the B final in the 100m, fourth in both the 200m and 400m. Four years later he competed in London in the 2012 Paralympic Games where he won his heat in the 100m and 400m but did not run in the semi-final and final respectively. He was also a part of the Brazilian T11–13 that was disqualified but did earn the silver medal in 200m 0.02 seconds behind teammate Filipe Gomes.
