= Timothée Adolphe =

French Paralympic sprinter (born 1989)

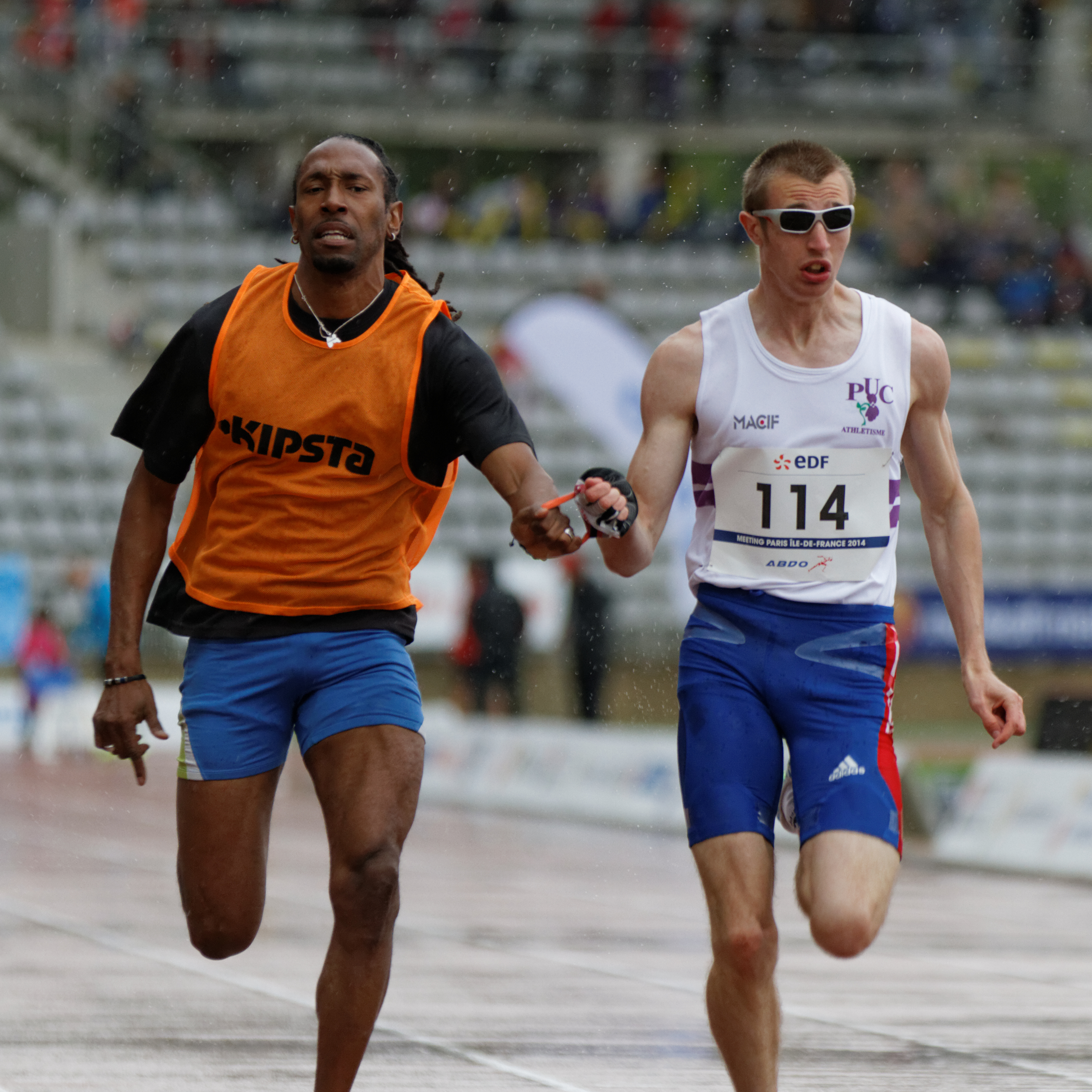
- Timothée Adolphe and Cédric Felip (guide)

Personal information
- Nickname: Guepard Blanc (The White Cheetah)
- Born: 29 December 1989 (age 36) Versailles, France
- Home town: Guyancourt, France
- Height: 1.84 m (6 ft 0 in)

Sport
- Country: France
- Sport: Paralympic athletics
- Disability: Congenital glaucoma
- Disability class: T11
- Events: 100 metres 200 metres 400 metres
- Club: Paris Université Club
- Coached by: Arthémon Hatungimana
Medal record
Men's para athletics
Representing France
Paralympic Games
Silver medal – second place	2020 Tokyo	100 m T11
Silver medal – second place	2024 Paris	100 m T11
Silver medal – second place	2024 Paris	400 m T11
World Championships
Gold medal – first place	2019 Dubai	400m T11
Silver medal – second place	2019 Dubai	100m T11
Bronze medal – third place	2013 Lyon	400m T11
Bronze medal – third place	2015 Doha	400m T11
Bronze medal – third place	2023 Paris	400m T11
Bronze medal – third place	2023 Paris	100m T11
European Championships
Gold medal – first place	2014 Swansea	200m T11
Gold medal – first place	2014 Swansea	400m T11
Gold medal – first place	2016 Grosseto	100m T11
Gold medal – first place	2016 Grosseto	200m T11
Gold medal – first place	2018 Berlin	100m T11
Silver medal – second place	2014 Swansea	4x100m relay T11-13
Silver medal – second place	2018 Berlin	Universal relay
Bronze medal – third place	2016 Grosseto	400m T12
Bronze medal – third place	2018 Berlin	200m T11

Timothée Adolphe (born 29 December 1989) is a blind French Paralympic athlete who competes in sprinting events in international level events. He participates in sprinting events with running guides Fadil Bellaabouss, Bruno Naprix and Jeffrey Lami.

== Career ==
In September 2021, he was awarded the Ordre national du Mérite.
