= Lahja Ishitile =

Namibian Paralympic track and field athlete

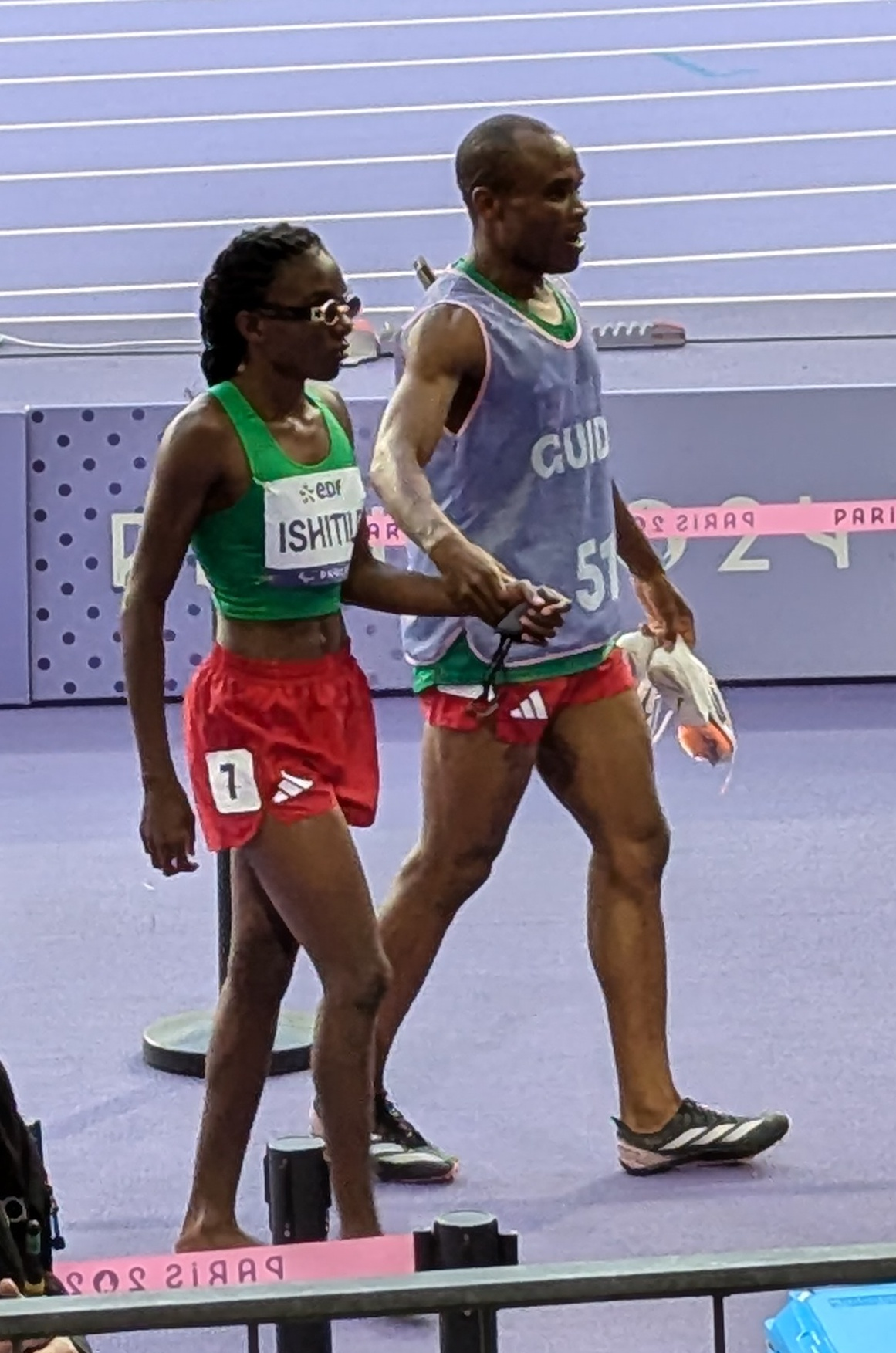
- Ishitile and her guide at the 2024 Summer Paralympics

Personal information
- Born: July 21, 1997 (age 28) Outapi, Namibia

Sport
- Country: Namibia
- Sport: Para-athletics
- Disability class: T11
Medal record
Representing Namibia
Women's para-athletics
Paralympic Games
Gold medal – first place	2024 Paris	400 m T11
Bronze medal – third place	2024 Paris	200 m T11
World Championships
Silver medal – second place	2023 Paris	400 m T11
Commonwealth Games
Bronze medal – third place	2014 Glasgow	100 m T12
African Games
Bronze medal – third place	2015 Brazzaville	200 m T11

Lahja Ishitile (born July 21, 1997) is a Namibian Paralympic T11 track and field athlete.

== Early life ==
Ishitile was born in Outapi, a town in northern Namibia. She grew up in the village of Okapanda, located in the Omusati Region. Ishitile began losing her eyesight at age 7 due to a medical condition, and was completely blind by age 11. At age 10 she began attending Eluwa Special School in Ongwediva, where she began participating in sports and running. She has cited her parents as supportive forces throughout her athletic career.

== Career ==
In 2011, at Namibia's National Paralympic Championships in Windhoek, Ishitile won three gold medals in the 100m, 200m and 400m events. She was 14 at the time. The following year, she was on the Namibian team for the Zone 6 Youth Games in Lusaka, Zambia, where she again won threefold medals.

Ishitile first competed internationally in 2013, first at the South African Disabled Championships and then at the IPC Athletics World Championships in Lyon, France. She competed in the finals of both the 100m and 400m events. In 2014, she won a bronze medal at the Commonwealth Games in the women's T11/T12 100m event.

In 2015, Ishitile won a bronze medal at the African Games in Brazzaville, Republic of the Congo in the 100m event. At the IPC Athletics 2015 World Championships in Doha, Qatar, Ishitile competed in the Women's 400m, 200m, and 100m races, all in the T11 category.

At the 2016 Paralympic Games in Rio de Janeiro, Ishitile ran in the Women's 400m, 200m, and 100m races.

In 2017, Ishitile competed in the Women's 400m and 200m races at the World Para Athletics Championships in London.

In 2019, Ishitile again competed at the World Para Athletics Championships, this time held in Dubai. In addition to the 400m, 200m, and 100m races, she also competed in long jump and the 4 × 100 m Universal Relay.

Ishitile competed at the 2020 Tokyo Paralympics in long jump, 400m, and 200m.

At the 2023 World Para Athletics Championships in Paris, Ishitile won silver in the women's T11 400m final. Her time of 57.18 seconds broke the previous record for an African woman running the event. Similarly, she set a new record for fastest African women to run the T11 100m, with a time of 12.38 seconds. That year she also won a Regional Annual Sports Award from the Namibia Paralympic Committee.

As of 2023, Ishitile runs with guide Sem Shimanda.

At the 2024 Summer Paralympics, Ishitile won gold in the women's T11 400m, setting a Paralympic record of 56.20 after running the fastest time in qualifiers and in the semi-final. She also won bronze in the women's T11 200m. She also served as one of Namibia's flag bearers at the Opening Ceremony.

== Education ==
Ishitile is currently (2024) pursuing a Bachelor of Library and Information Science at the University of Namibia.
