= Johannes Nambala =

Namibian Paralympic athlete (born 1991)

Personal information
- Nationality: Namibian
- Born: 15 February 1991 (age 35) Iikokola, Namibia
- Education: University of Namibia
- Height: 170 cm (5 ft 7 in)

Sport
- Country: Namibia
- Sport: Para-athletics
- Disability class: T13
- Event: Sprint
- Club: Oshakati Athletics Sports Club
Medal record
Men's para-athletics (T13)
Representing Namibia
Summer Paralympics
Silver medal – second place	2016 Rio de Janeiro	100 m T13
Silver medal – second place	2016 Rio de Janeiro	400 m T13
Bronze medal – third place	2020 Tokyo	400 m T13
World Championships
Gold medal – first place	2013 Lyon	400 m T13
Gold medal – first place	2015 Doha	200 m T13
Gold medal – first place	2019 Dubai	400 m T13
Silver medal – second place	2013 Lyon	200 m T13
Silver medal – second place	2017 London	200 m T13
Silver medal – second place	2017 London	400 m T13
Silver medal – second place	2023 Paris	400 m T13
Bronze medal – third place	2015 Doha	400 m T13
Bronze medal – third place	2019 Dubai	100 m T13
African Games
Gold medal – first place	2015 Brazzaville	400 m T13

Johannes Nambala (born 15 February 1991) is a Paralympian athlete from Namibia competing mainly in category T13 sprint events. In 2013 he became the first Namibian to win a gold medal at an IPC Athletics World Championships, when he won the 400m sprint in Lyon. As well as World Championship success Nambala has also won two silver Paralympic medals, both silver, and both won at the 2016 Summer Paralympics in Rio de Janeiro.

== Personal life ==
Nambala was born in 1991 in the village of Iikokola, in the Uukwaluudhi District of Namibia. He was born with a congenital complication that left him visually impaired; though he is not blind. Nambala now lives in Windhoek, and was educated at Windhoek Technical High School.

== Athletics career ==
Nambala took up athletics in 2012 whilst in South Africa. Training out of Oshakati Athletics Sports Club he was classified as a T13 competitor for visually impaired athletes. He made his senior debut in 2013 and that year he was selected for the Namibia team and travelled to Lyon to compete at the 2013 IPC Athletics World Championships. There he competed in three events, winning a silver in the 200 metres and became the first Namibian athlete to win an IPC World Athletics gold when he broke the championship record to take 400 metres title.

In the buildup to the 2016 Summer Paralympics in Rio de Janeiro, Nambala took part in the 2015 IPC Athletics World Championships in Doha. He took another two World Championship medals, a bronze in the 400 metres, despite posting a faster time than won him the title two years prior, and a gold in the 200 metres. He followed the World Championships with his first African Games, competing in the 400 metres. His time of 48.49 was enough to beat his nearest rival, Algeria's Abdelatif Baka, to claim the gold medal. The next year, at the Rio Paralympics, Nambala entered three events, the 100 metre (T13), the 200 metre (T13) and the 4 x 100 metre relay (T11-13) He won two medals, placing second in both the T13 100m sprint and the T13 400m sprint.
