= Reginald Benade =

Namibian Paralympic athlete (born 1974)

Medal record

Paralympic athletics

Representing Namibia

Paralympic Games
Bronze medal – third place	2008 Beijing	Discus Throw – F35/36

Reginald Benade (also known as Johannes), born 1974 in Rehoboth, Namibia,is a Paralympian athlete from Namibia competing mainly in category F35/36 throwing events.

He competed in the 2008 Summer Paralympics in Beijing, China. There he won a bronze medal in the men's F35/36 discus throw event. He also competed in the 2012 Summer Paralympics.

Benade was injured in a motorcycle accident in 1997 resulting in cerebral palsy. In February 2015, Benade was reportedly attacked with a pair of pliers during an altercation at a metro station in Taipei, Taiwan and sustained head injuries. Chiu Kuang-hsun was subsequently arrested on suspicion of attempted murder.
