= Ananias Shikongo =

Namibian Paralympic athlete

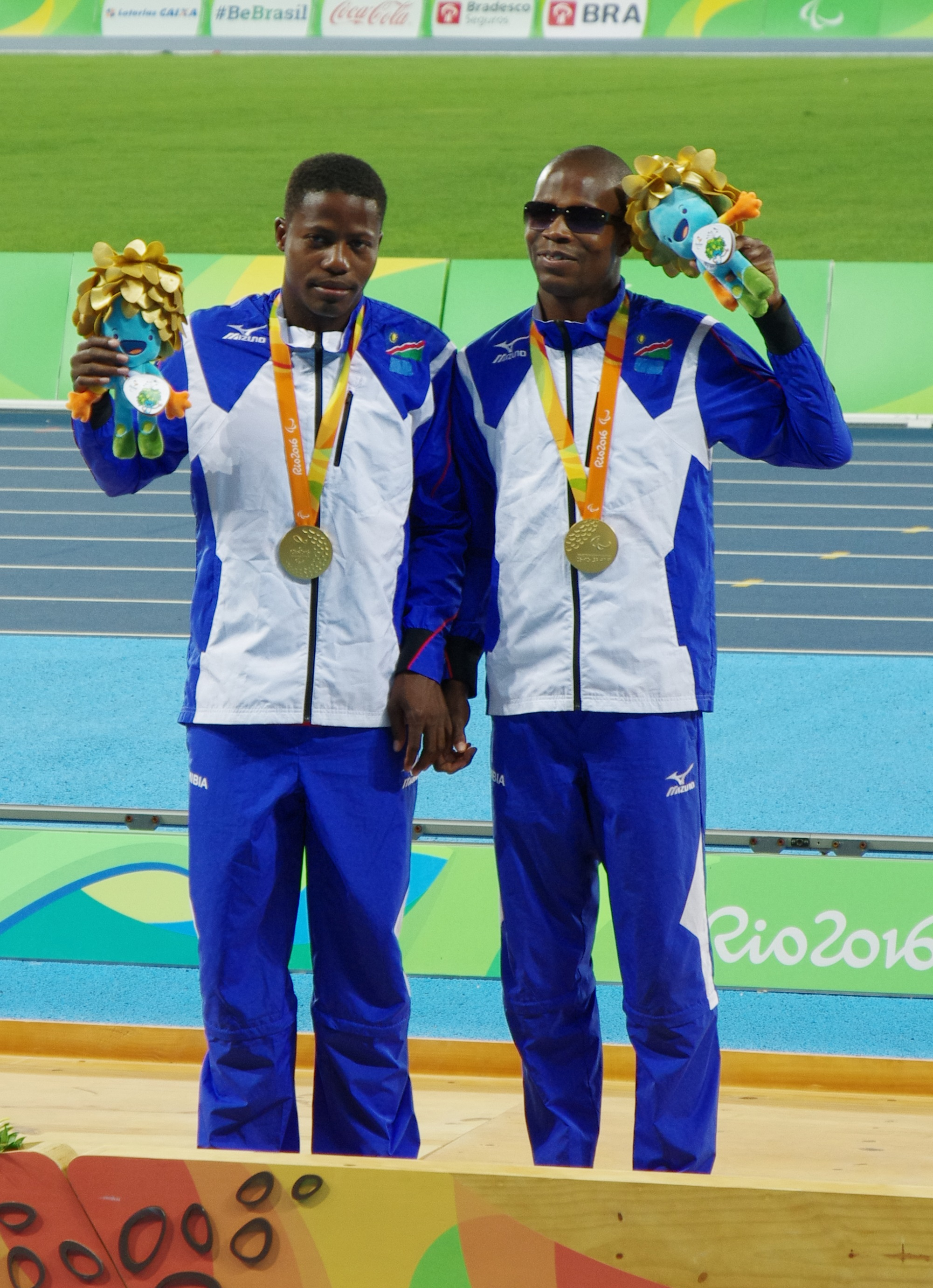
- Ananias Shikongo (right) and Guide Runner Even Tjiviju (left) at the Paralympic Games in Rio de Janeiro 2016

Personal information
- Born: 25 April 1986 (age 40) Okankolo, Namibia

Sport
- Country: Namibia
- Sport: Athletics
- Event: T11 Sprint
Medal record
Men's para athletics
Representing Namibia
Paralympic Games
Gold medal – first place	2016 Rio de Janeiro	200 m T11
Silver medal – second place	2020 Tokyo	400 m T11
Bronze medal – third place	2016 Rio de Janeiro	100 m T11
Bronze medal – third place	2016 Rio de Janeiro	400 m T11
World Championships
Silver medal – second place	2013 Lyon	200m T11
Silver medal – second place	2015 Doha	200m T11
Silver medal – second place	2017 London	100m T11
Silver medal – second place	2023 Paris	100m T11
Silver medal – second place	2025 New Delhi	100m T11
Bronze medal – third place	2011 Christchurch	400m T11
Bronze medal – third place	2013 Lyon	100m - T11
All African Games
Gold medal – first place	2015 Brazzaville	100m
Gold medal – first place	2015 Brazzaville	200m
Gold medal – first place	2015 Brazzaville	400m
Gold medal – first place	2011 Maputo	200m
Bronze medal – third place	2011 Maputo	400m

Ananias Shikongo (born 25 April 1986) is a Paralympian athlete from Namibia competing mainly in category T11 short-distance events. He was born in 1986 and lives in Windhoek, Namibia. Among his achievements is a gold medal at the 2016 Summer Paralympics in Rio de Janeiro.

== Personal life ==
Shikongo grew up in Okankolo Constituency, Oshikoto Region, in a village in proximity to the Angolan border. He lost his eyesight in both eyes in two separate incidents during his childhood. He went to Eluwa Special School in Ongwediva and to Windhoek Technical High School.

Shikongo shares a house in the Katutura township with Paralympic silver medalist and school friend Johannes Nambala.

Outside of athletics training, he sells fruits, vegetables and other goods.

He has a son born in 2014.

== Career ==
Shikongo is a prolific African T11 sprinter. He competed in the 2016 Summer Paralympics in Rio de Janeiro, where he won three medals, placing third in both the T11 100m and 400m sprints and coming first in the T11 200m. He won the 200m with a Paralympic Record time of 22.44 seconds. He is the third Namibian athlete to win a medal at a Paralympic competition, and the first Namibian man to win a gold medal.

He also competed in the 2020 Summer Paralympics and the 2024 Summer Paralympics.

Shikongo is supported by the Sport on the Move Foundation, which is a private initiative to mobilise funds.
