= Athletics at the 2024 Summer Paralympics – Men's 800 metres =

Athletics – Men's 800 metres at the XVII Paralympic Games
- Venue: Stade de France
- Dates: 5 – 7 September 2024
- No. of events: 3

800 metres
Men's · T34 · T53 · T54 · Women's · T34 · T53 · T54

The Men's 800m athletics events for the 2024 Summer Paralympics will take place at the Stade de France from 5 to 7 September, 2024. A total of 3 events will be contested over this distance.

== Schedule ==
R	Round 1	F	Final

Date	Thu 5		Fri 6		Sat 7	
Event	M	E	M	E	M	E
T34 800m			R		F	
T53 800m	R	F				
T54 800m	R	F				

== Medal summary ==
The following is a summary of the medals awarded across all 800 metres events.

Classification	Gold		Silver		Bronze	
T34	Austin Smeenk; Canada	1:39.27	Chaiwat Rattana; Thailand	1:39.48	Rheed McCracken; Australia	1:40.13
T53	Brent Lakatos; Canada	1:37.32 SB	Pongsakorn Paeyo; Thailand	1:38.26	Brian Siemann; United States	1:38.44
T54	Jin Hua; China	1:28.20 PR, AR	Dai Yunqiang; China	1:29.94 PB	Marcel Hug; Switzerland	1:30.98

== Results ==
The following were the results of the finals only of each of the Men's 800 metres events in each of the classifications. Further details of each event, including where appropriate heats and semi finals results, are available on that event's dedicated page.

=== T34 ===
The T34 category is for wheelchair athletes with cerebral palsy. Athletes in this category have minimal limitations or control problems in their arms and trunk while pushing a wheelchair.

The final in this classification will take place on 7 September 2024, at 10:12:

Rank	Name	Nationality	Time	Notes
1st place, gold medalist(s)	Austin Smeenk	Canada	1:39.27	
2nd place, silver medalist(s)	Chaiwat Rattana	Thailand	1:39.48	
3rd place, bronze medalist(s)	Rheed McCracken	Australia	1:40.13	
4	Wang Yang	China	1:40.14	
5	Walid Ktila	Tunisia	1:41.07	
6	Isaac Towers	Great Britain	1:41.68	
7	Ali Radi Arshid	Qatar	1:41.84	
8	Roberto Michel	Mauritius	1:42.17	SB

=== T53 ===
The T53 category is for wheelchair athletes with normal use of arms and hands, no or limited trunk function, and no leg function.

The final in this classification took place on 5 September 2024, at 19:58:

Rank	Name	Nationality	Time	Notes
1st place, gold medalist(s)	Brent Lakatos	Canada	1:37.32	
2nd place, silver medalist(s)	Pongsakorn Paeyo	Thailand	1:38.26	
3rd place, bronze medalist(s)	Brian Siemann	United States	1:38.44	
4	Pierre Fairbank	France	1:40.69	
5	Pichet Krungget	Thailand	1:40.71	
6	Masaberee Arsae	Thailand	1:40.91	
7	Yoo Byung-hoon	South Korea	1:41.20	SB
8	Mohamed Nidhal Khelifi	Tunisia	1:42.50	AR

=== T54 ===
The T54 category is for wheelchair athletes with no leg function, but near full arm function and reasonable to normal trunk function. Typically this may be caused by a lower spinal cord injury or spinal cord birth defect.

The final in this classification took place on 5 September 2024, at 20:21:

Rank	Name	Nationality	Time	Notes
1st place, gold medalist(s)	Jin Hua	China	1:28.20	PR
2nd place, silver medalist(s)	Dai Yunqiang	China	1:29.94	PB
3rd place, bronze medalist(s)	Marcel Hug	Switzerland	1:30.98	
4	Nathan Maguire	Great Britain	1:31.09	
5	Daniel Romanchuk	United States	1:31.24	
6	Athiwat Paeng-Nuea	Thailand	1:31.27	
7	Saichon Konjen	Thailand	1:31.60	
8	Hu Yang	China	1:31.89	SB
