= Athletics at the 2024 Summer Paralympics – Women's 800 metres =

Athletics – Women's 800 metres at the XVII Paralympic Games
- Venue: Stade de France
- Dates: 1 – 7 September 2024
- No. of events: 3

800 metres
Men's · T34 · T53 · T54 · Women's · T34 · T53 · T54

The Women's 800m athletics events for the 2024 Summer Paralympics took place at the Stade de France from 1 to 7 September, 2024. A total of 3 events were contested over this distance.

== Schedule ==
R	Round 1	F	Final

Date	Sun 1		Mon 2		Tue 3		Wed 4		Thu 5		Fri 6		Sat 7	
Event	M	E	M	E	M	E	M	E	M	E	M	E	M	E
T34 800m														F
T53 800m		F												
T54 800m	R	F												

== Medal summary ==
The following is a summary of the medals awarded across all 800 metres events.

Classification	Gold		Silver		Bronze	
T34	Hannah Cockroft; Great Britain	1:55.44	Kare Adenegan; Great Britain	2:03.12	Eva Houston; United States	2:05.94
T53	Catherine Debrunner; Switzerland	1:41.04 PR	Samantha Kinghorn; Great Britain	1:42.96	Zhou Hongzhuan; China	1:46.83 AR
T54	Manuela Schär; Switzerland	1:42.36 PR, SB	Zhou Zhaoqian; China	1:43.24 PB	Susannah Scaroni; United States	1:43.42

== Results ==
The following were the results of the finals only of each of the Women's 800 metres events in each of the classifications. Further details of each event, including where appropriate heats and semi finals results, are available on that event's dedicated page.

=== T34 ===
The T34 category is for wheelchair athletes with cerebral palsy. Athletes in this category have minimal limitations or control problems in their arms and trunk while pushing a wheelchair.

The final in this classification took place on 7 September 2024, at 20:20:

Rank	Name	Nationality	Time	Notes
1st place, gold medalist(s)	Hannah Cockroft	Great Britain	1:55.44	
2nd place, silver medalist(s)	Kare Adenegan	Great Britain	2:03.12	
3rd place, bronze medalist(s)	Eva Houston	United States	2:05.94	
4	Fabienne André	Great Britain	2:06.86	
5	Lan Hanyu	China	2:11.97	
6	Moe Onodera	Japan	2:15.85	SB
7	Liu Panpan	China	2:18.82	
8	Lauren Fields	United States	2:33.51	

=== T53 ===
The T53 category is for wheelchair athletes with normal use of arms and hands, no or limited trunk function, and no leg function.

The final in this classification took place on 1 September 2024, at 19:04:

Rank	Name	Nationality	Time	Notes
1st place, gold medalist(s)	Catherine Debrunner	Switzerland	1:41.04	PR
2nd place, silver medalist(s)	Samantha Kinghorn	Great Britain	1:42.96	
3rd place, bronze medalist(s)	Zhou Hongzhuan	China	1:46.86	AR
4	Hamide Dogangun	Turkey	1:51.70	SB
5	Gao Fang	China	1:51.81	PB
6	Angela Ballard	Australia	1:56.86	
7	Chelsea Stein	United States	2:11.91	

=== T54 ===
The T54 category is for wheelchair athletes with no leg function, but near full arm function and reasonable to normal trunk function. Typically this may be caused by a lower spinal cord injury or spinal cord birth defect.

The final in this classification took place on 1 September 2024, at 19:17:

Rank	Name	Nationality	Time	Notes
1st place, gold medalist(s)	Manuela Schaer	Switzerland	1:42.36	PR, SB
2nd place, silver medalist(s)	Zhou Zhaoqian	China	1:43.24	PB
3rd place, bronze medalist(s)	Susannah Scaroni	United States	1:43.42	
4	Tatyana McFadden	United States	1:43.58	SB
5	Lea Bayekula	Belgium	1:43.63	PB
6	Melanie Woods	Great Britain	1:43.85	PB
7	Hannah Dederick	United States	1:48.20	
8	Tian Yajuan	China	1:48.49	
