= Athletics at the 2024 Summer Paralympics – Men's 100 metres T53 =

Men's 100 metres T53 at the XVII Paralympic Games
- Venue: Stade de France
- Dates: 4 September 2024 (round 1 & finals)
- Competitors: 10 from 8 nations
- Winning time: 14.48

Medalists
| 1st place, gold medalist(s) | | Abdulrahman Al-Qurashi | Saudi Arabia |
| 2nd place, silver medalist(s) | | Pongsakorn Paeyo | Thailand |
| 3rd place, bronze medalist(s) | | Ariosvaldo Fernandes | Brazil |

100 metres at the 2024 Summer Paralympics
Men · T11 · T12 · T13 · T34 · T35 · T36 · T37 · T38 · T44 · T47 · T51 · T52 · T53 · T54 · T63 · T64
Women · T11 · T12 · T13 · T34 · T35 · T36 · T37 · T38 · T47 · T53 · T54 · T63 · T64

The men's 100 metres T53 event at the 2024 Summer Paralympics in Paris, took place on 4 September 2024.

The T53 category is for wheelchair athletes with normal use of arms and hands, no or limited trunk function, and no leg function.

== Records ==
Prior to the competition, the existing records were as follows:

| World Record | Brent Lakatos (CAN) | 14.10 | (Switzerland) Arbon | 27 May 2017 |
| Paralympic Record | Pongsakorn Paeyo (THA) | 14.20 | (Japan) Tokyo | 1 September 2021 |

| Area | Time | | Athlete | Location | Date |
|---|---|---|---|---|---|
| Africa | 14.81 | | (Tunisia) Mohamed Khelifi | (United Arab Emirates) Dubai | 13 February 2024 |
| America | 14.10 | WR | (Canada) Brent Lakatos | (Switzerland) Arbon | 27 May 2017 |
| Asia | 14.20 | | (Thailand) Pongsakorn Paeyo | (Japan) Tokyo | 1 September 2021 |
| Europe | 14.47 | | (United Kingdom) Mickey Bushell | (Switzerland) Arbon | 24 June 2010 |
| Oceania | 15.66 | | (Australia) Richard Colman | (Australia) Brisbane | 7 March 2015 |

== Results ==
=== Round 1 ===
First 3 in each heat (Q) and the next 2 fastest (q) advance to the Final.

==== Heat 1 ====
| Rank | Lane | Athlete | Nation | Time | Notes |
|---|---|---|---|---|---|
| 1 | 3 | Abdulrahman Al-Qurashi | Saudi Arabia | 14.57 | Q, SB |
| 2 | 4 | Pongsakorn Paeyo | Thailand | 14.99 | Q |
| 3 | 7 | Brian Siemann | United States | 15.35 | Q |
| 4 | 6 | Pichet Krungget | Thailand | 15.48 | q |
| 5 | 5 | Enkhmanlai Purevtsog | Mongolia | 16.03 | SB |
| Source: | | | | Wind: -0.9 m/s | |

==== Heat 2 ====
| Rank | Lane | Athlete | Nation | Time | Notes |
|---|---|---|---|---|---|
| 1 | 6 | Ariosvaldo Fernandes | Brazil | 15.19 | Q |
| 2 | 4 | Pierre Faribank | France | 15.32 | Q |
| 3 | 7 | Mohamed Khelifi | Tunisia | 15.60 | Q |
| 4 | 5 | Byunghoon Yoo | South Korea | 15.94 | q |
| 5 | 2 | Masaberee Arsae | Thailand | 16.03 | |
| Source: | | | | Wind: -0.8 m/s | |

=== Final ===
| Rank | Lane | Athlete | Nation | Time | Notes |
|---|---|---|---|---|---|
| 1st place, gold medalist(s) | 4 | Abdulrahman Al-Qurashi | Saudi Arabia | 14.48 | PB |
| 2nd place, silver medalist(s) | 5 | Pongsakorn Paeyo | Thailand | 14.66 | SB |
| 3rd place, bronze medalist(s) | 7 | Ariosvaldo Fernandes | Brazil | 15.08 | |
| 4 | 8 | Brian Siemann | United States | 15.27 | |
| 5 | 6 | Pierre Faribank | France | 15.28 | |
| 6 | 9 | Pichet Krungget | Thailand | 15.38 | |
| 7 | 3 | Mohamed Khelifi | Tunisia | 15.50 | |
| 8 | 2 | Byunghoon Yoo | South Korea | 15.92 | |
| Source: | | | | Wind: +0.6 m/s | |
