= Athletics at the 2024 Summer Paralympics – Men's 800 metres T53 =

Men's 800 metres T53 at the XVII Paralympic Games
- Venue: Stade de France, Paris, France
- Dates: 5 September 2024 (final)
- Competitors: 8 from 6 nations
- Winning time: 1:37.32

Medalists
1st place, gold medalist(s)		Brent Lakatos	Canada
2nd place, silver medalist(s)		Pongsakorn Paeyo	Thailand
3rd place, bronze medalist(s)		Brian Siemann	United States

800 metres
Men's · T34 · T53 · T54 · Women's · T34 · T53 · T54

The Men's 800 metres T53 at the 2024 Summer Paralympics took place 5 September at the Stade de France in Paris.

== Records ==
Athletes with a T51, T52 and T53 classification competed in this event. The World and Paralympic Games records for those classes were as follows:

T51
World Record	Helder Mestre (POR)	2:30.98	(United Arab Emirates) Sharjah	18 March 2018
Paralympic Record	Bart Dodson (USA)	2:45.78	(Spain) Barcelona	6 September 1992

Area	Time	Athlete	Location	Date
Africa				
America				
Asia				
Europe				
Oceania				

T52
World Record	Tomoki Sato (JPN)	1:51.57	(Australia) Canberra	21 January 2019
Paralympic Record	Abdellah ez-Zine (MAR)	1:58.68	(Greece) Athens	25 September 2004

Area	Time	Athlete	Location	Date
Africa				
America				
Asia				
Europe				
Oceania				

T53
World Record	Brent Lakatos (CAN)	1:31.69	(Switzerland) Arbon	2 June 2019
Paralympic Record	Pongsakorn Paeyo (THA)	1:36.07	(Japan) Tokyo	2 September 2021

Area	Time	Athlete	Location	Date
Africa				
America				
Asia				
Europe				
Oceania				

== Classification ==
The T53 category is for wheelchair athletes with normal use of arms and hands, no or limited trunk function, and no leg function.

== Results ==
=== Final ===
This event progressed directly to the final. The final in this classification took place on 5 September 2024.

Rank	Athlete	Nation	Time	Notes
1st place, gold medalist(s)	Brent Lakatos	Canada	1:37.32	SB
2nd place, silver medalist(s)	Pongsakorn Paeyo	Thailand	1:38.36	
3rd place, bronze medalist(s)	Brian Siemann	United States	1:38.44	
4	Pierre Fairbank	France	1:40.79	
5	Pichet Krungget	Thailand	1:40.71	
6	Masaberee Arsae	Thailand	1:40.91	
7	Byunghoon Yoo	South Korea	1:41.20	SB
8	Mohamed Nidhal Khelifi	Tunisia	1:42.50	AR
