= Athletics at the 2024 Summer Paralympics – Men's 1500 metres T54 =

Men's 1500 metres T54 at the XVII Paralympic Games
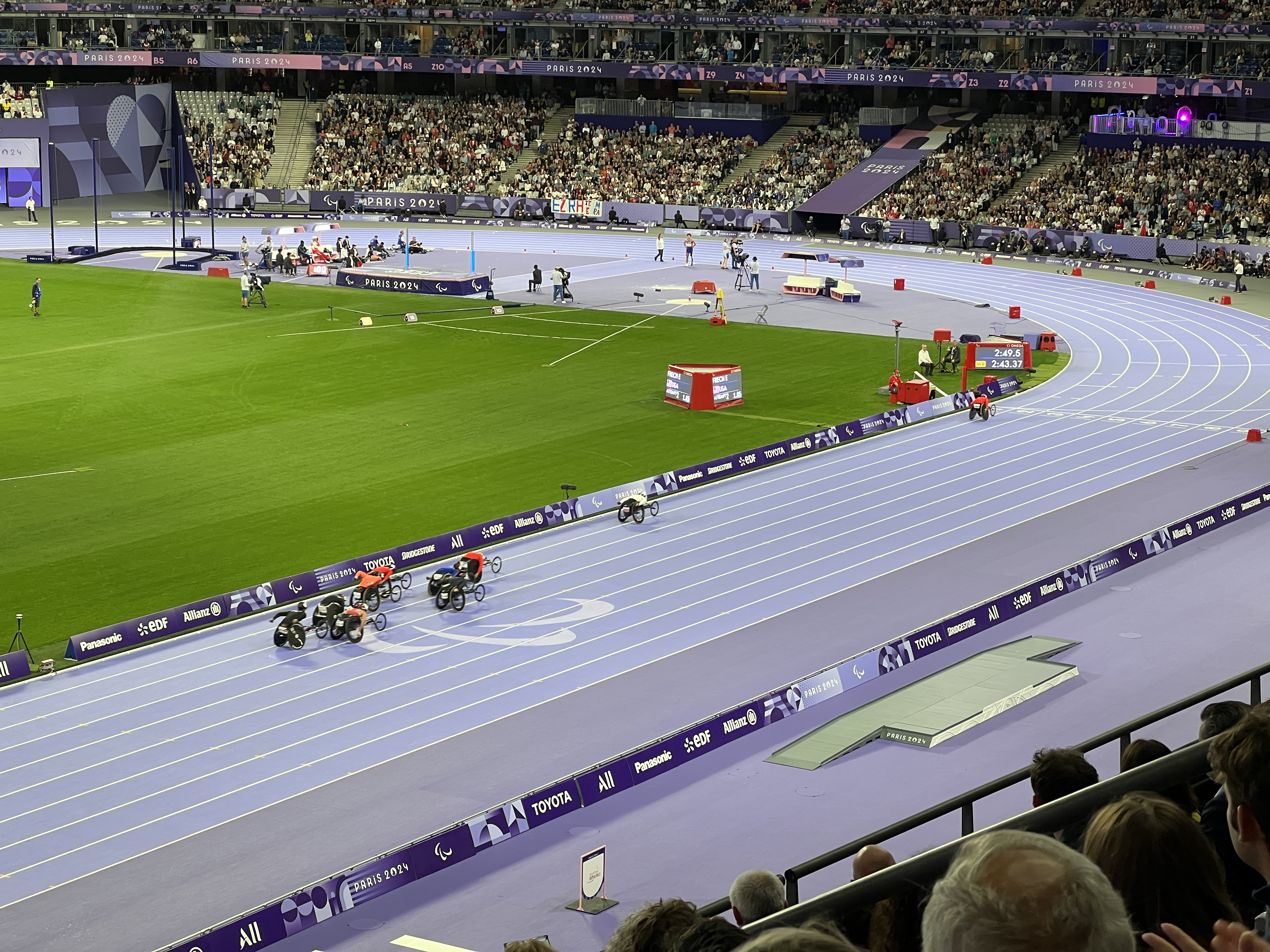
- Finish of the final.
- Venue: Stade de France
- Dates: 2 September 2024 (round 1); 3 September 2024 (final)
- Competitors: 16 from 10 nations
- Winning time: 2:49.93

Medalists
1st place, gold medalist(s)		Jin Hua	China
2nd place, silver medalist(s)		Marcel Hug	Switzerland
3rd place, bronze medalist(s)		Dai Yumqiang	China

1500 metres at the 2024 Summer Paralympics
Men's · T11 · T13 · T20 · T38 · T46 · T54 · Women's · T11 · T13 · T20 · T54

The men's 1500 metres T54 event at the 2024 Summer Paralympics in Paris, took place on 2 and 3 September 2024.

The T54 category is for wheelchair athletes with no leg function, but near full arm function and reasonable to normal trunk function. Typically this may be caused by a lower spinal cord injury or spinal cord birth defect.

== Records ==
Prior to the competition, the existing records were as follows:

World Record	Marcel Hug (SUI)	2:43.37	(United Arab Emirates) Dubai	27 February 2023
Paralympic Record	Marcel Hug (SUI)	2:49.55	(Japan) Tokyo	31 August 2021

Area	Time	Athlete	Location	Date
Africa				
America				
Asia				
Europe				
Oceania				

== Results ==
=== Round 1 ===
First 5 in each heat (Q) advance to the Final.

==== Heat 1 ====
Rank	Athlete	Nation	Time	Notes
1	Jin Hua	China	2:56.05	Q
2	Dai Yumqiang	China	2:57.28	Q
3	Nathan Maguire	Great Britain	2:57.41	Q
4	Yassine Gharbi	Tunisia	2:57.48	Q, SB
5	Marcel Hug	Switzerland	2:58.42	Q
6	Putharet Khongrak	Thailand	2:58.57	
7	Aaron Pike	United States	2:58.86	
8	Brent Lakatos	Canada	2:59.19	SB
9	Samuel Rizzo	Australia	3:02.92	

==== Heat 2 ====
Rank	Athlete	Nation	Time	Notes
1	Daniel Romanchuk	United States	3:05.10	Q
2	Faisal Alrajehi	Kuwait	3:05.16	Q
3	Luo Xingchuan	China	3:05.19	Q
4	Phiphatphong Sianglam	Thailand	3:05.26	Q
5	Tomoki Suzuki	Japan	3:05.31	Q
6	David Weir	Great Britain	3:05.35	
7	Daniel Sidbury	Great Britain	3:05.44	
—	Saichon Konjen	Thailand	DNS	

=== Final ===
Rank	Athlete	Nation	Time	Notes
1st place, gold medalist(s)	Jin Hua	China		
2nd place, silver medalist(s)	Marcel Hug	Switzerland		
3rd place, bronze medalist(s)	Dai Yumqiang	China		PB
4	Phiphatphong Sianglam	Thailand		
5	Nathan Maguire	Great Britain		
6	Luo Xingchuan	China		PB
7	Tomoki Suzuki	Japan		
8	Yassine Gharbi	Tunisia		SB
9	Daniel Romanchuk	United States		SB
10	Faisal Alrajehi	Kuwait		
