= Athletics at the 2024 Summer Paralympics – Men's 100 metres T34 =

Men's 100 metres T34 at the XVII Paralympic Games
- Venue: Stade de France
- Dates: 1 September 2024 (round 1); 2 September 2024 (final)
- Competitors: 10 from 9 nations
- Winning time: 14.76 PR

Medalists
1st place, gold medalist(s)		Chaiwat Rattana	Thailand
2nd place, silver medalist(s)		Walid Ktila	Tunisia
3rd place, bronze medalist(s)		Austin Smeenk	Canada

100 metres at the 2024 Summer Paralympics
Men · T11 · T12 · T13 · T34 · T35 · T36 · T37 · T38 · T44 · T47 · T51 · T52 · T53 · T54 · T63 · T64
Women · T11 · T12 · T13 · T34 · T35 · T36 · T37 · T38 · T47 · T53 · T54 · T63 · T64

The men's 100 metres T34 event at the 2024 Summer Paralympics in Paris, took place on 1 and 2 September 2024.

The T34 category is for wheelchair athletes with cerebral palsy. Athletes in this category have minimal limitations or control problems in their arms and trunk while pushing a wheelchair.

== Records ==
Prior to the competition, the existing records were as follows:

World Record	Walid Ktila (TUN)	14.46	(Switzerland) Arbon	1 June 2019
Paralympic Record	Walid Ktila (TUN)	15.01	(Japan) Tokyo	30 August 2021

Area	Time		Athlete	Location	Date
Africa	14.46	WR	(Tunisia) Walid Ktila	(Switzerland) Arbon	1 June 2019
America	14.93		(United States) Austin Smeenk	(Switzerland) Nottwil	9 June 2024
Asia	14.95		(United Arab Emirates) Mohamad Othman	(Switzerland) Nottwil	9 June 2024
Europe	15.25		(United Kingdom) Craig Boardman	(Switzerland) Nottwil	5 August 2017
Oceania	14.79		(Australia) Rheed McCracken	(Switzerland) Arbon	1 June 2019

== Results ==
=== Round 1 ===
First 3 in each heat (Q) and the next 2 fastest (q) advance to the Final.

==== Heat 1 ====
Rank	Lane	Athlete	Nation	Time	Notes
1	3	Austin Smeenk	Canada	15.38	Q
2	7	Rheed McCracken	Australia	15.62	Q, SB
3	6	Henry Manni	Finland	15.74	Q
4	4	Mohamad Othman	United Arab Emirates	15.77	q
5	5	Gong Wenhao	China	15.81	q
Source:				Wind: -0.4 m/s	

==== Heat 2 ====
Rank	Lane	Athlete	Nation	Time	Notes
1	4	Chaiwat Rattana	Thailand	14.81	Q, PR, AR
2	6	Walid Ktila	Tunisia	15.09	Q
3	7	Ali Arshid	Qatar	15.20	Q, PB
4	5	Wang Yang	China	15.86	SB
5	3	Roberto Michel	Mauritius	16.01	
Source:				Wind: -1.1 m/s	

=== Final ===
Rank	Lane	Athlete	Nation	Time	Notes
1st place, gold medalist(s)	5	Chaiwat Rattana	Thailand	14.76	PR, AR
2nd place, silver medalist(s)	4	Walid Ktila	Tunisia	15.14	
3rd place, bronze medalist(s)	6	Austin Smeenk	Canada	15.19	
4	3	Rheed McCracken	Australia	15.31	SB
5	2	Mohamad Othman	United Arab Emirates	15.40	
6	7	Ali Arshid	Qatar	15.42	
7	8	Henry Manni	Finland	15.64	
8	9	Gong Wenhao	China	15.67	
Source:				Wind: -0.8 m/s	
