= 2025 World Para Athletics Championships – Men's 800 metres =

The men's 800 metres events at the 2025 World Para Athletics Championships were held at the Jawaharlal Nehru Stadium, Delhi in New Delhi.

== Medalists ==
Event	Gold	Silver	Bronze
T20	Ndiaga Dieng; Italy	Meshal Mahutan; Saudi Arabia	Mehmet Emin Eğilmez; Turkey
T34	Wang Yang; China	Chaiwat Rattana; Thailand	Austin Smeenk; Canada
T53	Pongsakorn Paeyo; Thailand	Mohamed Nidhal Khelifi; Tunisia	Vitalii Gritsenko; Neutral Paralympic Athletes
T54	Jin Hua; China	Dai Yunqiang; China	Yassine Gharbi; Tunisia

== T20 ==
Final

The event took place on 1 October.

Rank	Name	Nationality	Time	Notes
1st place, gold medalist(s)	Ndiaga Dieng	Italy	1:53.91	
2nd place, silver medalist(s)	Meshal Mahutan	Saudi Arabia	1:54.26	
3rd place, bronze medalist(s)	Mehmet Emin Eğilmez	Turkey	1:54.34	PB
4	Gavriil Arampatzis	Greece	1:55.16	PB
5	Abdulmajeed Ghafiry	Saudi Arabia	1:56.86	
6	Cha Soo-myeong	South Korea	1:59.55	PB
7	Daniel Milone	Australia	2:01.51	OC
8	Maksim Angelov	Neutral Paralympic Athletes	2:02.22	SB

== T34 ==
Final

The event took place on 5 October

Rank	Name	Nationality	Time	Notes
1st place, gold medalist(s)	Wang Yang	China	1:40.24	
2nd place, silver medalist(s)	Chaiwat Rattana	Thailand	1:40.37	SB
3rd place, bronze medalist(s)	Austin Smeenk	Canada	1:40.50	
4	Rheed McCracken	Australia	1:40.68	
5	Walid Ktila	Tunisia	1:40.73	
6	Mohamad Othman	United Arab Emirates	1:41.47	
7	Ahmed Nawad	United Arab Emirates	1:41.76	SB
8	Ali Radi Arshid	Qatar	1:42.28	

.

Round 1

The event took place on 4 October. Qualification: First 3 in each heat (Q) and the next 2 fastest (q) advance to the Final

Rank	Heat	Name	Nationality	Time	Notes
1	1	Wang Yang	China	1:40.12	Q, CR
2	1	Walid Ktila	Tunisia	1:40.28	Q
3	1	Rheed McCracken	Australia	1:41.01	Q
4	2	Austin Smeenk	Canada	1:41.45	Q
5	2	Mohamad Othman	United Arab Emirates	1:42.36	Q
6	2	Ali Radi Arshid	Qatar	1:42.75	Q
7	1	Ahmed Nawad	United Arab Emirates	2:01.57	q
	2	Chaiwat Rattana	Thailand	DNF	qR
	2	Roberto Michel	Mauritius	DQ	
	1	Henry Manni	Finland	DQ	

== T53 ==
Final

The event took place on 3 October.

Rank	Name	Nationality	Time	Notes
1st place, gold medalist(s)	Pongsakorn Paeyo	Thailand	1:35.76	CR
2nd place, silver medalist(s)	Mohamed Nidhal Khelifi	Tunisia	1:37.15	AF
3rd place, bronze medalist(s)	Vitalii Gritsenko	Neutral Paralympic Athletes	1:37.52	SB
4	Yoo Byung-hoon	South Korea	1:37.89	PB
5	Pierre Fairbank	France	1:38.24	SB
6	Masaberee Arsae	Thailand	1:39.04	SB

== T54 ==
Final

The event took place on 5 October.

Rank	Name	Nationality	Time	Notes
1st place, gold medalist(s)	Jin Hua	China	1:27.04	WR
2nd place, silver medalist(s)	Dai Yunqiang	China	1:31.46	SB
3rd place, bronze medalist(s)	Yassine Gharbi	Tunisia	1:31.53	SB
4	Julien Casoli	France	1:31.73	
5	Nathan Maguire	Great Britain	1:32.16	
6	Thibault Daurat	France	1:32.19	
7	Phiphatphong Sianglam	Thailand	1:32.42	
8	Lito Anker	Netherlands	1:33.21	

Round 1

The event took place on 4 October. Qualification: First 2 in each heat (Q) and the next 2 fastest (q) advance to the Final

Rank	Heat	Name	Nationality	Time	Notes
1	1	Jin Hua	China	1:30.34	Q, CR
2	1	Thibault Daurat	France	1:30.79	Q
3	1	Phiphatphong Sianglam	Thailand	1:30.82	q, SB
4	1	Lito Anker	Netherlands	1:31.57	q
5	3	Dai Yunqiang	China	1:33.98	Q, SB
6	3	Julien Casoli	France	1:34.07	Q
7	1	Samuel Rizzo	Australia	1:34.52	
8	3	Samuel Carter	Australia	1:34.68	
9	3	Putharet Khongrak	Thailand	1:34.71	SB
10	3	Gabriel Sosa	Argentina	1:35.08	PB
11	3	Albaraa Al-Qarni	Saudi Arabia	1:35.49	PB
12	2	Nathan Maguire	Great Britain	1:36.00	Q
13	2	Yassine Gharbi	Tunisia	1:36.10	Q
14	2	Hiroki Kishizawa	Japan	1:36.24	
15	2	Athiwat Paeng-nuea	Thailand	1:36.67	
16	2	Ma Zhuo	China	1:37.58	SB
17	1	Ludwig Malter	Austria	1:37.64	SB
18	2	Cedric Ravet	Mauritius	1:40.79	
