= Athletics at the 2024 Summer Paralympics – Men's 100 metres T63 =

Men's 100 metres T63 at the XVII Paralympic Games
- Venue: Stade de France
- Dates: 1 September 2024 (round 1); 2 September 2024 (final)
- Competitors: 11 from 10 nations
- Winning time: 12.06

Medalists
1st place, gold medalist(s)		Ezra Frech	United States
2nd place, silver medalist(s)		Daniel Wagner	Denmark
3rd place, bronze medalist(s)		Vinícius Gonçalves Rodrigues	Brazil

100 metres at the 2024 Summer Paralympics
Men · T11 · T12 · T13 · T34 · T35 · T36 · T37 · T38 · T44 · T47 · T51 · T52 · T53 · T54 · T63 · T64
Women · T11 · T12 · T13 · T34 · T35 · T36 · T37 · T38 · T47 · T53 · T54 · T63 · T64

The men's 100 metres T63 event at the 2024 Summer Paralympics in Paris, took place on 1 and 2 September 2024.

== Records ==
Prior to the competition, the existing records were as follows:

T42
World record	Anton Prokhorov (RPC)	12.04	(Japan) Tokyo	30 August 2021
Paralympic record	Anton Prokhorov (RPC)	12.04	(Japan) Tokyo	30 August 2021

Area	Time		Athlete	Location	Date
Africa	Vacant				
America	13.78		Record mark		
Asia	12.22		(Indonesia) Partin	(Japan) Kobe	25 May 2024
Europe	12.04	WR	Anton Prokhorov	(Japan) Tokyo	30 August 2021
Oceania	Vacant				

T63
World record	Vinícius Gonçalves Rodrigues (BRA)	11.95	(Brazil) São Paulo	25 April 2019
Paralympic record	Vinícius Gonçalves Rodrigues (BRA)	12.05	(Japan) Tokyo	30 August 2021

Area	Time		Athlete	Location	Date
Africa	12.04		(South Africa) Michael Mabote	(Japan) Kobe	25 May 2024
America	11.95	WR	(Brazil) Vinícius Gonçalves Rodrigues	(Brazil) São Paulo	25 April 2019
Asia	12.61		(Japan) Atsushi Yamamoto	(Qatar) Doha	25 October 2015
Europe	12.02		(Germany) Leon Schaefer	(Germany) Leverkusen	6 July 2024
Oceania	12.13		(Australia) Scott Reardon	(Qatar) Doha	25 October 2015

== Results ==
=== Round 1 ===
First 3 in each heat (Q) and the next 2 fastest (q) advance to the Final.

==== Heat 1 ====
Rank	Lane	Athlete	Nation	Time	Notes
1	5	Puseletso Mabote	South Africa	12.05	Q, =PR
2	4	Joel de Jong	Netherlands	12.09	Q, SB
3	8	Ezra Frech	United States	12.14	Q, SB
4	3	Partin Muhlisin	Indonesia	12.31	q
5	6	Phalathip Khamta	Thailand	12.92	
6	7	Anil Yodha Pedige	Sri Lanka	13.03	
Source:				Wind: +0.2 m/s	

==== Heat 2 ====
Rank	Lane	Athlete	Nation	Time	Notes
1	4	Leon Schaefer	Germany	12.11	Q
2	6	Daniel Wagner	Denmark	12.21	Q, PB
3	7	Vinícius Gonçalves Rodrigues	Brazil	12.24	Q, SB
4	5	Desmond Jackson	United States	12.41	q
5	3	Alessandro Ossola	Italy	12.46	
Source:				Wind: 0.0 m/s	

=== Final ===
Rank	Lane	Athlete	Nation	Time	Notes
1st place, gold medalist(s)	8	Ezra Frech	United States	12.06	PB
2nd place, silver medalist(s)	4	Daniel Wagner	Denmark	12.08	PB
3rd place, bronze medalist(s)	3	Vinícius Gonçalves Rodrigues	Brazil	12.10	SB
4	6	Leon Schaefer	Germany	12.12	
5	5	Puseletso Mabote	South Africa	12.16	
6	7	Joel de Jong	Netherlands	12.20	
7	2	Desmond Jackson	United States	12.49	
8	9	Partin Muhlisin	Indonesia	12.51	
Source:				Wind: +0.1 m/s	
