= Athletics at the 2024 Summer Paralympics – Women's 100 metres T53 =

Women's 100 metres T53 at the XVII Paralympic Games
- Venue: Stade de France
- Dates: 4 September 2024
- Competitors: 7 from 6 nations
- Winning time: 15.64

Medalists
| 1st place, gold medalist(s) | | Samantha Kinghorn | Great Britain |
| 2nd place, silver medalist(s) | | Catherine Debrunner | Switzerland |
| 3rd place, bronze medalist(s) | | Gao Fang | China |

100 metres at the 2024 Summer Paralympics
Men · T11 · T12 · T13 · T34 · T35 · T36 · T37 · T38 · T44 · T47 · T51 · T52 · T53 · T54 · T63 · T64
Women · T11 · T12 · T13 · T34 · T35 · T36 · T37 · T38 · T47 · T53 · T54 · T63 · T64

The women's 100 metres T53 event at the 2024 Summer Paralympics in Paris, took place on 4 September 2024.

The T53 category is for wheelchair athletes with normal use of arms and hands, no or limited trunk function, and no leg function.

== Records ==
Prior to the competition, the existing records were as follows:

| World record | Catherine Debrunner (SUI) | 15.25 | (Switzerland) Nottwil | 27 May 2023 |
| Paralympic record | Huang Lisha (CHN) | 16.19 | (Brazil) Rio de Janeiro | 8 September 2016 |

| Area | Time | | Athlete | Location | Date |
|---|---|---|---|---|---|
| Africa | 18.51 | | (Nigeria) Olajumoke Olajide | (United Arab Emirates) Dubai | 18 March 2016 |
| America | 16.12 | | (Bermuda) Jessica Cooper Lewis | (Switzerland) Nottwil | 8 June 2024 |
| Asia | 16.11 | | (China) Gao Fang | (Switzerland) Nottwil | 27 May 2023 |
| Europe | 15.25 | WR | (Switzerland) Catherine Debrunner | (Switzerland) Nottwil | 27 May 2023 |
| Oceania | 16.46 | | (Australia) Angela Ballard | (Switzerland) Nottwil | 28 May 2016 |

== Results ==
=== Final ===
The final will take place on 4 September 2024:

| Rank | Lane | Athlete | Nation | Time | Notes |
|---|---|---|---|---|---|
| 1st place, gold medalist(s) | 7 | Samantha Kinghorn | Great Britain | 15.64 | PR |
| 2nd place, silver medalist(s) | 5 | Catherine Debrunner | Switzerland | 15.77 | |
| 3rd place, bronze medalist(s) | 2 | Gao Fang | China | 16.16 | SB |
| 4 | 4 | Zhou Hongzhuan | China | 16.49 | SB |
| 5 | 8 | Jessica Lewis | Bermuda | 16.83 | |
| 6 | 6 | Hamide Dogangun | Turkey | 16.88 | |
| 7 | 3 | Chelsea Stein | United States | 18.30 | |
| Source: | | | | Wind: +1.2 m/s | |
