= Athletics at the 2024 Summer Paralympics – Women's 800 metres T53 =

Women's 800 metres T53 at the XVII Paralympic Games
- Venue: Stade de France
- Dates: 1 September 2024
- Competitors: 7 from 6 nations
- Winning time: 1:41.04 PR

Medalists
1st place, gold medalist(s)		Catherine Debrunner	Switzerland
2nd place, silver medalist(s)		Samantha Kinghorn	Great Britain
3rd place, bronze medalist(s)		Zhou Hongzhuan	China

800 metres
Men's · T34 · T53 · T54 · Women's · T34 · T53 · T54

The women's 800 metres T53 event at the 2024 Summer Paralympics in Paris, took place on 1 September 2024.

The T53 category is for wheelchair athletes with normal use of arms and hands, no or limited trunk function, and no leg function.

== Records ==
Prior to the competition, the existing records were as follows:

World Record	Catherine Debrunner (SUI)	1:37.96	(United Arab Emirates) Sharjah	4 February 2024
Paralympic Record	Madison de Rozario (AUS)	1:45.99	(Japan) Tokyo	29 August 2021

Area	Time		Athlete	Location	Date
Africa	2:13.00		(Kenya) Anne Wafula	(Kenya) Nairobi	25 July 2003
America	1:45.90		(United States) Chelsea McClammer	(Switzerland) Arbon	28 May 2017
Asia	1:47.45		(China) Zhou Hongzhuan	(Brazil) Rio de Janeiro	17 September 2016
Europe	1:37.96	WR	(Switzerland) Catherine Debrunner	(United Arab Emirates) Sharjah	4 February 2024
Oceania	1:45.53		(Australia) Madison de Rozario	(Australia) Canberra	21 February 2019

== Results ==
=== Final ===
Rank	Athlete	Nation	Time	Notes
1st place, gold medalist(s)	Catherine Debrunner	Switzerland	1:41.04	PR
2nd place, silver medalist(s)	Samantha Kinghorn	Great Britain	1:42.96	
3rd place, bronze medalist(s)	Zhou Hongzhuan	China	1:46.83	AR
4	Hamide Dogangun	Turkey	1:51.70	SB
5	Gao Fang	China	1:51.81	PB
6	Angela Ballard	Australia	1:56.83	
7	Chelsea Stein	United States	2:11.91	
