= Mehmet Emin Eğilmez =

Turkish para-athlete (born 2003)

Personal information
- Born: 2 March 2003 (age 23)

Sport
- Country: Turkey
- Sport: Para-athletics
- Disability class: T20
- Event(s): 800 metres, 1500 metres
Medal record
Men's para-athletics
Representing Turkey
World Championships
Bronze medal – third place	2025 New Delhi	800 m T20

Mehmet Emin Eğilmez (born 2 March 2003) is a Turkish para athlete who competes in T20 middle-distance running events.

== Career ==
Eğilmez competed at the 2025 World Para Athletics Championships and won a bronze medal in the 800 metre T20 event with a personal best time of 1:54.34 seconds.
