= Meshal Mahutan =

Saudi Arabian para-athlete (born 1999)

Personal information
- Full name: Meshal Yahya Mahutan
- Born: 26 March 1999 (age 27)

Sport
- Country: Saudi Arabia
- Sport: Para-athletics
- Disability class: T20
- Event(s): 800 metres, 1500 metres
Medal record
Men's para-athletics
Representing Saudi Arabia
World Championships
Silver medal – second place	2025 New Delhi	800 m T20

Meshal Yahya Mahutan (born 26 March 1999) is a Saudi Arabian para athlete who competes in T20 middle-distance running events.

== Career ==
Mahutan competed at the 2025 World Para Athletics Championships and won a silver medal in the 800 metre T20 event with a time of 1:54.26 seconds.
