= Athletics at the 2024 Summer Paralympics – Men's 100 metres T44 =

Men's 100 metres T44 at the XVII Paralympic Games
- Venue: Stade de France
- Dates: 1 September 2024
- Competitors: 9 from 9 nations
- Winning time: 11.12

Medalists
1st place, gold medalist(s)		Mpumelelo Mhlongo	South Africa
2nd place, silver medalist(s)		Yamel Luis Vives Suares	Cuba
3rd place, bronze medalist(s)		Eddy Bernard	Malaysia

100 metres at the 2024 Summer Paralympics
Men · T11 · T12 · T13 · T34 · T35 · T36 · T37 · T38 · T44 · T47 · T51 · T52 · T53 · T54 · T63 · T64
Women · T11 · T12 · T13 · T34 · T35 · T36 · T37 · T38 · T47 · T53 · T54 · T63 · T64

The men's 100 metres T44 event at the 2024 Summer Paralympics in Paris, took place on 1 September 2024.

The T44 category is for athletes who have a single below knee amputation or who can walk with moderately reduced function in one or both legs.

== Records ==
Prior to the competition, the existing records were as follows:

World Record	Mpumelelo Mhlongo (RSA)	11.00	(United Arab Emirates) Dubai	11 November 2019
Paralympic Record	Mpumelelo Mhlongo (RSA)	11.03	(Japan) Tokyo	30 August 2021

Area	Time		Athlete	Location	Date
Africa	11.00	WR	(South Africa) Mpumelelo Mhlongo	(United Arab Emirates) Dubai	11 November 2019
America	11.33		(Brazil) Matheus de Lima	(Brazil) São Paulo	8 June 2024
Asia	11.75		(Sri Lanka) Indika Gamage	(Japan) Kobe	20 May 2024
Europe	11.85		(Germany) Tom Malutedi	(Germany) Leverkusen	21 June 2019
Oceania	13.45		Record mark		

== Results ==
=== Final ===
Rank	Lane	Athlete	Nation	Time	Notes
1st place, gold medalist(s)	4	Mpumelelo Mhlongo	South Africa	11.12	SB
2nd place, silver medalist(s)	7	Yamel Luis Vives Suares	Cuba	11.20	AR
3rd place, bronze medalist(s)	3	Eddy Bernard	Malaysia	11.58	AR
4	8	Felicien Siapo	France	11.66	AR
5	5	Indika Gamage	Sri Lanka	11.67	SB
6	2	Nour Alsana	Saudi Arabia	11.70	PB
7	9	Karim Ramadan	Egypt	11.96	
8	1	Marco Cicchetti	Italy	12.03	SB
9	6	Matheus de Lima	Brazil	12.15	
Source:				Wind: -0.7 m/s	
