= Athletics at the 2024 Summer Paralympics – Women's 100 metres T38 =

Women's 100 metres T38 at the XVII Paralympic Games
- Venue: Stade de France
- Dates: 31 August 2024
- Competitors: 18 from 11 nations
- Winning time: 12.26 WR

Medalists
1st place, gold medalist(s)		Karen Palomeque	Colombia
2nd place, silver medalist(s)		Lida-Maria Manthopoulou	Greece
3rd place, bronze medalist(s)		Darian Faisury Jiménez	Colombia

100 metres at the 2024 Summer Paralympics
Men · T11 · T12 · T13 · T34 · T35 · T36 · T37 · T38 · T44 · T47 · T51 · T52 · T53 · T54 · T63 · T64
Women · T11 · T12 · T13 · T34 · T35 · T36 · T37 · T38 · T47 · T53 · T54 · T63 · T64

The women's 100 metres T38 event at the 2024 Summer Paralympics in Paris, took place on 31 August 2024.

The T38 category is for ambulant athletes with cerebral palsy. T38 athletes have the mildest form of impairment caused by cerebral palsy, often in only one limb, and not affecting the ability to run, walk or jump freely, although impairing performance. T38 athletes may suffer minor co-ordination difficulties.

== Records ==
Prior to the competition, the existing records were as follows:

World Record	Sophie Hahn (GBR)	12.38	(Japan) Tokyo	28 August 2021
Paralympic Record	Sophie Hahn (GBR)	12.38	(Japan) Tokyo	28 August 2021

Area	Time		Athlete	Location	Date
Africa	13.65		(Tunisia) Sonia Mansour	(China) Beijing	9 September 2008
America	12.49		(Colombia) Darian Faisury Jiménez	(Japan) Tokyo	28 August 2021
Asia	12.97		(China) Chen Junfei	(Qatar) Doha	22 October 2015
Europe	12.38	WR	(United Kingdom) Sophie Hahn	(Japan) Tokyo	28 August 2021
Oceania	12.91		(Australia) Rhiannon Clarke	(France) Paris	11 July 2023

== Results ==
=== Round 1 ===
Heats took place on 31 August 2024. The first 3 in each heat (Q) and the next 2 fastest (q) advanced to the Final.

==== Heat 1 ====
Rank	Lane	Athlete	Nation	Time	Notes
1	9	Lida-Maria Manthopoulou	Greece	12.53	Q, PB
2	8	Darian Faisury Jiménez	Colombia	12.70	Q, SB
3	5	Maddie Down	Great Britain	12.93	Q, PB
4	3	Olivia Breen	Great Britain	12.95	
5	6	Lindy Ave	Germany	13.08	SB
6	7	Ella Pardy	Australia	13.15	SB
7	2	Nele Moos	Germany	13.38	PB
8	1	Sofia Pace	France	13.60	PB
9	4	Yuka Takamatsu	Japan	14.86	
Source:				Wind: 0.0 m/s	

==== Heat 2 ====
Rank	Lane	Athlete	Nation	Time	Notes
1	5	Karen Palomeque	Colombia	12.45	Q, AR
2	1	Sophie Hahn	Great Britain	12.52	Q, SB
3	9	Luca Ekler	Hungary	12.63	Q, SB
4	4	Rhiannon Clarke	Australia	12.78	Q, AR
5	3	Margarita Goncharova	Neutral Paralympic Athletes	12.84	Q, PB
6	8	Chen Zimo	China	12.97	=AR
7	2	Catarina Guimarães	United States	13.54	PB
8	7	Friederike Brose	Germany	13.80	
9	6	Milagros del Valle Gonzalez	Argentina	14.19	PB
Source:				Wind: +0.2 m/s	

=== Final ===
The final took place on 31 August 2024:

Rank	Lane	Athlete	Nation	Time	Notes
1st place, gold medalist(s)	4	Karen Palomeque	Colombia	12.26	WR
2nd place, silver medalist(s)	5	Lida-Maria Manthopoulou	Greece	12.49	PB
3rd place, bronze medalist(s)	6	Darian Faisury Jiménez	Colombia	12.53	SB
4	9	Rhiannon Clarke	Australia	12.72	AR
5	8	Luca Ekler	Hungary	12.78	
6	7	Sophie Hahn	Great Britain	12.88	
7	2	Margarita Goncharova	Neutral Paralympic Athletes	12.96	
8	3	Maddie Down	Great Britain	13.02	
Source:				Wind: +0.8 m/s	
