= Athletics at the 2024 Summer Paralympics – Men's 100 metres T52 =

Men's 100 metres T52 at the XVII Paralympic Games
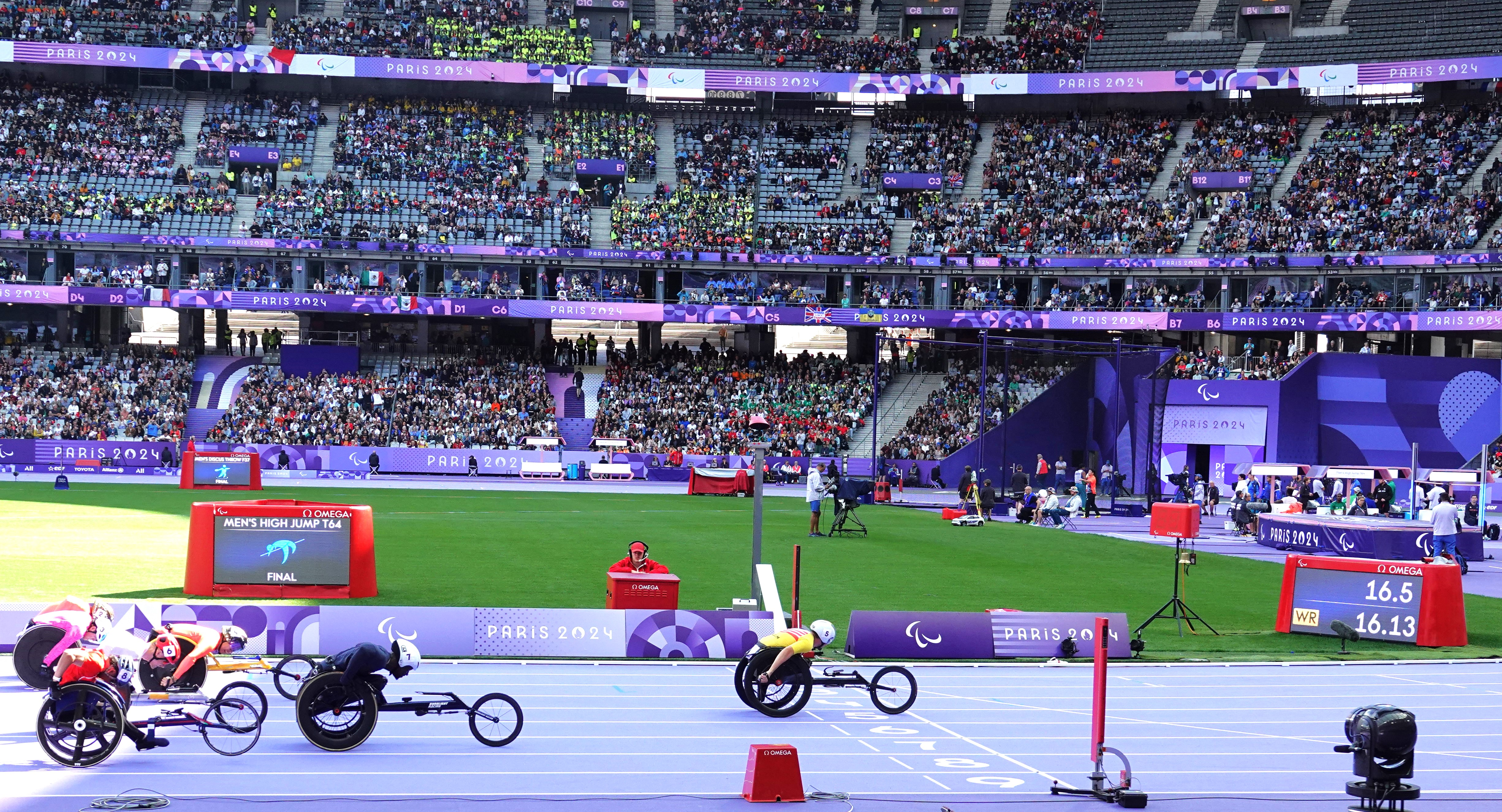
- Finish of the final.
- Venue: Stade de France
- Dates: 5 September 2024 (round 1); 6 September 2024 (final)
- Competitors: 12 from 8 nations
- Winning time: 16.70

Medalists
1st place, gold medalist(s)		Maxime Carabin	Belgium
2nd place, silver medalist(s)		Marcus Perrineau-Daley	Great Britain
3rd place, bronze medalist(s)		Tomoki Sato	Japan

100 metres at the 2024 Summer Paralympics
Men · T11 · T12 · T13 · T34 · T35 · T36 · T37 · T38 · T44 · T47 · T51 · T52 · T53 · T54 · T63 · T64
Women · T11 · T12 · T13 · T34 · T35 · T36 · T37 · T38 · T47 · T53 · T54 · T63 · T64

The men's 100 metres T52 event at the 2024 Summer Paralympics in Paris, took place on 5 and 6 September 2024.

The T52 category is for wheelchair athletes with damage to spinal cord in the higher parts of the back, substantially impaired or no trunk function, and minimal or no leg function. Pushing power comes from elbow extensions, and appears close to normal except for use of modified gloves to compensate for grip.

== Records ==
Prior to the competition, the existing records were as follows:

World Record	Maxime Carabin (BEL)	16.13	(Belgium) Brussels	29 June 2024
Paralympic Record	Raymond Martin (USA)	16.79	(United Kingdom) London	2 September 2012

Area	Time		Athlete	Location	Date
Africa	17.89		(South Africa) Brandon Beack	(Switzerland) Arbon	1 June 2019
America	16.41		(United States) Raymond Martin	(Switzerland) Arbon	30 May 2019
Asia	16.75		(Japan) Yuki Oya	(Japan) Kobe	10 July 2021
Europe	16.13	WR	(Belgium) Maxime Carabin	(Belgium) Brussels	29 June 2024
Oceania	17.31		(Australia) Sam McIntosh	(Switzerland) Nottwil	8 June 2024

== Results ==
=== Round 1 ===
First 3 in each heat (Q) and the next 2 fastest (q) advance to the Final.

==== Heat 1 ====
Rank	Lane	Athlete	Nation	Time	Notes
1	6	Tomoki Sato	Japan	17.20	Q
2	7	Anthony Bouchard	Canada	17.43	Q
3	3	Salvador Hernández	Mexico	17.45	Q, SB
4	4	Tomoya Ito	Japan	17.58	q
5	8	Fabian Blum	Switzerland	18.48	
6	5	Jerrold Mangliwan	Philippines	19.44	
Source:				Wind: +0.3 m/s	

==== Heat 2 ====
Rank	Lane	Athlete	Nation	Time	Notes
1	8	Maxime Carabin	Belgium	16.21	Q, PR
2	4	Marcus Perrineau-Daley	Great Britain	16.87	Q, PB
3	3	Leonardo de Jesús Pérez Juárez	Mexico	17.57	Q, SB
4	6	Tatsuya Ito	Japan	17.76	q
5	7	Sam McIntosh	Australia	17.88	
6	4	Beat Boesch	Switzerland	17.96	
Source:				Wind: -0.2 m/s	

=== Final ===
Rank	Lane	Athlete	Nation	Time	Notes
1st place, gold medalist(s)	5	Maxime Carabin	Belgium	16.70	
2nd place, silver medalist(s)	7	Marcus Perrineau-Daley	Great Britain	17.27	
3rd place, bronze medalist(s)	4	Tomoki Sato	Japan	17.44	
4	6	Anthony Bouchard	Canada	17.55 (.542)	
5	8	Salvador Hernández	Mexico	17.55 (.548)	
6	3	Leonardo de Jesús Pérez Juárez	Mexico	17.67 (.662)	
7	2	Tomoya Ito	Japan	17.67 (.665)	
8	9	Tatsuya Ito	Japan	17.91	
Source:				Wind: +1.6 m/s	
