= Athletics at the 2020 Summer Paralympics – Men's 100 metres T63 =

Men's 100 metres T63 at the XVI Paralympic Games
- Venue: Tokyo National Stadium
- Dates: 29 August 2021 (heats); 30 August 2021 (final)
- Competitors: 10 from 9 nations
- Winning time: 12.04

Medalists
1st place, gold medalist(s)		Anton Prokhorov	RPC
2nd place, silver medalist(s)		Vinícius Gonçalves Rodrigues	Brazil
3rd place, bronze medalist(s)		Léon Schäfer	Germany

Men's 100 metres
T11 · T12 · T13 · T33 · T34 · T35 · T36 · T37 · T38 · T47 · T51 · T52 · T53 · T54 · T63 · T64

The men's 100 metres T63 event at the 2020 Summer Paralympics in Tokyo, took place between 29 and 30 August 2021.

== Records ==
Prior to the competition, the existing records were as follows:

World Record	Vinícius Gonçalves Rodrigues (BRA)	11.95	São Paulo, Brazil	25 April 2019
Paralympic Record	Scott Reardon (AUS)	12.26	Rio de Janeiro, Brazil	14 September 2016

Area	Time	Athlete	Nation
Africa	13.57	Record Mark	
America	11.95 WR	Vinícius Gonçalves Rodrigues	Brazil
Asia	12.61	Atsushi Yamamoto	Japan
Europe	12.11	Heinrich Popow	Germany
Oceania	12.13	Scott Reardon	Australia

== Results ==
=== Heats ===
Heat 1 took place on 29 August 2021, at 21:41:

Rank	Lane	Name	Nationality	Class	Time	Notes
1	3	Vinícius Gonçalves Rodrigues	Brazil	T63	12.11	Q, GR
2	4	Anton Prokhorov	RPC	T42	12.15	Q, WR
3	7	Puseletso Mabote	South Africa	T63	12.64	Q, AR
4	5	Scott Reardon	Australia	T63	12.80	q
5	6	Atsushi Yamamoto	Japan	T63	13.20	

Heat 2 took place on 29 August 2021, at 21:47:

Rank	Lane	Name	Nationality	Class	Time	Notes
1	6	Léon Schäfer	Germany	T63	12.32	Q, SB
2	4	Daniel Wagner	Denmark	T63	12.61	Q
3	7	Alessandro Ossola	Italy	T63	12.77	Q
4	3	Joël de Jong	Netherlands	T63	13.00	q
5	5	Junta Kosuda	Japan	T63	13.58	

=== Final ===
The final took place on 30 August 2021, at 20:33:

Rank	Lane	Name	Nationality	Class	Time	Notes
1st place, gold medalist(s)	6	Anton Prokhorov	RPC	T42	12.04	WR
2nd place, silver medalist(s)	5	Vinícius Gonçalves Rodrigues	Brazil	T63	12.05	GR
3rd place, bronze medalist(s)	7	Léon Schäfer	Germany	T63	12.22	PB
4	4	Daniel Wagner	Denmark	T63	12.37	=SB
5	3	Scott Reardon	Australia	T63	12.43	SB
6	9	Alessandro Ossola	Italy	T63	12.66	
7	8	Puseletso Mabote	South Africa	T63	12.66	
8	2	Joël de Jong	Netherlands	T63	12.90	
