= Athletics at the 2024 Summer Paralympics – Men's 800 metres T34 =

Men's 800 metres T34 at the XVII Paralympic Games
- Venue: Stade de France, Paris, France
- Dates: 6 September 2024 (round one); 7 September 2024 (final)
- Competitors: 11 from 10 nations
- Winning time: 1:39.27

Medalists
1st place, gold medalist(s)		Austin Smeenk	Canada
2nd place, silver medalist(s)		Chaiwat Rattana	Thailand
3rd place, bronze medalist(s)		Rheed McCracken	Australia

800 metres
Men's · T34 · T53 · T54 · Women's · T34 · T53 · T54

The Men's 800 metres T34 at the 2024 Summer Paralympics took place 6 and 7 September at the Stade de France in Paris. 11 athletes entered the heats on 6 September.

== Classification ==
The T34 category is for wheelchair athletes with cerebral palsy. Athletes in this category have minimal limitations or control problems in their arms and trunk while pushing a wheelchair.

== Records ==
T33
World Record	Ahmad Al-Mutairi (KUW)	1:52.52	(Qatar) Doha	25 October 2015
Paralympic Record	Jeremy Rempel (CAN)	2:45.98	(Spain) Barcelona	10 September 1992

Area	Time	Athlete	Location	Date
Africa				
America				
Asia				
Europe				
Oceania				

T34
World Record	Austin Smeenk (CAN)	1:35.39	(France) Paris	14 June 2024
Paralympic Record	Mohamed Hammadi (UAE)	1:40.24	(Brazil) Rio de Janeiro	17 September 2016

Area	Time	Athlete	Location	Date
Africa				
America				
Asia				
Europe				
Oceania				

== Results ==
=== Round 1 ===
Round one of this event took place on the morning of 6 September 2024 at the Stade de France. First 3 in each heat (Q) and the next 2 fastest (q) advance to the Final.

==== Heat 1 ====
Rank	Athlete	Nation	Time	Notes
1	Wang Yang	China	1:38.57	Q, PR
2	Chaiwat Rattana	Thailand	1:38.61	Q
3	Ali Radi Arshid	Qatar	1:40.36	Q
4	Rheed McCracken	Australia	1:41.51	q
5	Isaac Towers	Great Britain	1:42.62	q
6	Mohamad Othman	United Arab Emirates	1:44.88	

==== Heat 2 ====
Rank	Athlete	Nation	Time	Notes
1	Walid Ktila	Tunisia	01:44.60	Q
2	Austin Smeenk	Canada	01:44.91	Q
3	Roberto Michel	Mauritius	01:46.17	Q
4	Gong Wenhao	China	01:46.19	
5	Henry Manni	Finland	01:46.27	

=== Final ===
The final in this classification will take place on 7 September 2024, at 10:12

Rank	Athlete	Nation	Time	Notes
1st place, gold medalist(s)	Austin Smeenk	Canada	1:39.27	
2nd place, silver medalist(s)	Chaiwat Rattana	Thailand	1:39.48	
3rd place, bronze medalist(s)	Rheed McCracken	Australia	1:40.13	
4	Wang Yang	China	1:40.14	
5	Walid Ktila	Tunisia	1:41.07	
6	Isaac Towers	Great Britain	1:41.68	
7	Ali Radi Arshid	Qatar	1:41.84	
8	Roberto Michel	Mauritius	1:42.17	SB
