= Yamel Luis Vives =

Cuban Paralympic athlete (born 1998)

Personal information
- Nationality: Cuban
- Born: Yamel Luis Vives Suares; 27 December 1998 (age 27)

Sport
- Sport: Para-athletics
- Disability class: T44
- Event: 100 metres
Medal record
Para-athletics
Representing Cuba
Paralympic Games
Silver medal – second place	2024 Paris	100 m T44

Yamel Luis Vives Suares (born 27 December 1998) is a Cuban T44 Paralympic sprint runner. He represented Cuba at the 2024 Summer Paralympics.

== Career ==
He represented Cuba at the 2024 Summer Paralympics and won a silver medal in the 100 metres T44 event.
