= Mpumelelo Mhlongo =

South African athlete (born 1994)

Personal information
- Nationality: South African
- Born: 22 March 1994 (age 32) Chatsworth, KwaZulu-Natal

Sport
- Sport: Paralympic athletics
- Disability class: T44
Medal record
Representing South Africa
Paralympic athletics
Paralympic Games
Gold medal – first place	2024 Paris	100 m T44
Bronze medal – third place	2024 Paris	200 m T64
World Championships
Gold medal – first place	2023 Paris	100 m T44
Gold medal – first place	2024 Kobe	100 m T44
Silver medal – second place	2019 Dubai	100 m T44

Mpumelelo Mhlongo (born 22 March 1994) is a South African sprint and long jump athlete and Paralympic Games record holder. Mhlongo won silver and bronze at the 2019 World Para Athletics Championships in the T44 men's 100 metres and long jump events.

Mlongo lives with constriction ring syndrome and a deformed clubfoot.

== Track and field career ==
Mhlongo has represented South Africa at the Tokyo 2020 Paralympics Games, where he broke the T44 200m World Record and set the T44 200m, 100m, and long jump Paralympic Games records. His first Paralympic appearance was at the Rio 2016 Paralympics Games. His other representation in major championships include three World Championships and one World Games, since his debut in 2015.

Mhlongo set his first ratified world record in 2019 at the Grosseto Grand Prix in the T44 Long Jump of 7.03m (+1.6 m/s), being the only T44 athlete to jump over the 7m mark. In the same year, he went on to win the silver and bronze medals in the 100m and long jump, respectively, another world record breaking performance.

Mhlongo has two training bases, the primary-one in Johannesburg, where he trains with Roger Haitengi and the secondary in Cape Town, where he trains with Jason Sewanyana.

Mhlongo has been awarded the City of Cape Town and Western Cape Government Sportsman with a Disability in 2019, 2021, and 2022. In 2020, he was awarded the Western Cape Ministerial Commendation Award for his involvement in community programs that raised funds for the upliftment of disability sports in South Africa.

== Social work ==
Mhlongo's first active involvement in the non-profit sector was in 2016, as an ambassador for Jumping Kids. He has since been named as the patron for the Chaeli Sports and Recreation Club (CSRC), which falls under the Chaeli Campaign, an organisation founded by Michaela Mycroft.

In 2022, Mhlongo became the Clubfoot Champion Ambassador for Steps Clubfoot Care.

== Personal life ==
Mpumelelo Mhlongo was born in Chatsworth, KwaZulu-Natal, with a congenital deformity, constriction ring syndrome, and club foot. He grew up in Klaarwater, KwaZulu Natal, South Africa. Because of the decisions his parents took that allowed him to enrol in the public school system in the suburbs beginning in first grade, Mhlongo views his mother as the protagonist of his childhood. He was later placed at Kloof High School, which allowed him to continue his sporting ambitions and saw him share the award for the Junior Sportsman of the Year in his first year of high school. He received the Edwin Henwood Trophy during his matriculation, with several distinctions, including head of the world champion choir and head of House for Finningley House at Kearsney College. In matric, he was awarded the Edwin Henwood Trophy. Mhlongo then received a scholarship and pursued his chemical engineering studies at the University of Cape Town. He was on the regular Dean's Merit list at the University of Cape Town and his achievements include winning Sportsperson of the Year five years in a row. He is currently studying for his doctorate in the conversion of plastic waste into energy at the University of Cape Town.

Mhlongo is multi-lingual and speaks six languages, including Afrikaans, isiXhosa, isiZulu, English, French, and Portuguese.

== Sponsors ==
Mpumelelo is currently sponsored by the Investec Group. Investec is partnering and supporting him on his road to the Paris 2024 Paralympic Games. Mhlongo is already working as an employee for Investec South Africa.

Mhlongo was part of the National Lotteries Commission Tokyo 2020 Team South Africa funded athletes (which had a R2.8 million preparation budget allocation and R17.8 million Games budget) for the Tokyo 2020 Paralympic Games. Prior to this, Mhlongo was part of the Tier One South African Sports Confederation and Olympics Committee (SASCOC's) Operation Excellence Programme (OPEX).

== Awards ==
- Sportsman with a Disability of the Year (2019)
- SA Sports Award (2022)
- Sportsperson of the Year
