= Athletics at the 2024 Summer Paralympics – Men's 800 metres T54 =

Men's 800 metres T54 at the XVII Paralympic Games
- Venue: Stade de France, Paris, France
- Dates: 5 September 2024
- Competitors: 13
- Winning time: 1:28.20 PR, AR

Medalists
1st place, gold medalist(s)		Jin Hua	China
2nd place, silver medalist(s)		Dai Yunqiang	China
3rd place, bronze medalist(s)		Marcel Hug	Switzerland

800 metres
Men's · T34 · T53 · T54 · Women's · T34 · T53 · T54

The Men's 800 metres T54 at the 2024 Summer Paralympics took place on the morning and evening of 5 September at the Stade de France in Paris.

== Records ==
World Record	Marcel Hug (SUI)	1:27.76	(Switzerland) Arbon	21 May 2023
Paralympic Record	Daniel Romanchuk (USA)	1:31.83	(Japan) Tokyo	2 September 2021

Area	Time	Athlete	Location	Date
Africa				
America				
Asia				
Europe				
Oceania				

== Classification ==
The T54 category is for wheelchair athletes with no leg function, but near full arm function and reasonable to normal trunk function. Typically this may be caused by a lower spinal cord injury or spinal cord birth defect.

== Results ==
=== Round 1 ===
The heats of the Men's 800 metres T54 took place on the morning of 5 September 2024. First 3 in each heat (Q) and the next 2 fastest (q) advance to the Final.

==== Heat 1 ====
Rank	Athlete	Nation	Time	Notes
1	Athiwat Paeng-Nuea	Thailand	1:35.93	Q
2	Nathan Maguire	Great Britain	1:35.93	Q
3	Yang Hu	China	1:36.00	Q
4	Yassine Gharbi	Tunisia	1:36.30	
5	Faisal Alrajehi	Kuwait	1:36.92	
6	Putharet Khongrak	Thailand	1:41.11	
7	Luke Bailey	Australia	1:51.34	

==== Heat 2 ====
Rank	Athlete	Nation	Time	Notes
1	Jin Hua	China	1:31.50	Q, PR, PB
2	Daniel Romanchuk	United States	1:31.78	Q
3	Marcel Hug	Switzerland	1:33.18	Q
4	Yunqiang Dai	China	1:33.73	q
5	Saichon Konjen	Thailand	1:33.81	q
6	Samuel Rizzo	Australia	1:45.33	
—	Daniel Sidbury	Great Britain	DNS	

=== Final ===
The final in this classification took place on the Evening of 5 September 2024.

Rank	Athlete	Nation	Time	Notes
1st place, gold medalist(s)	Jin Hua	China	1:28.20	PR, AR
2nd place, silver medalist(s)	Dai Yunqiang	China	1:29.94	PB
3rd place, bronze medalist(s)	Marcel Hug	Switzerland	1:30.98	
4	Nathan Maguire	Great Britain	1:31.09	
5	Daniel Romanchuk	United States	1:31.24	
6	Athiwat Paeng-Nuea	Thailand	1:31.27	
7	Saichon Konjen	Thailand	1:31.60	
8	Yang Hu	China	1:31.89	SB
