= Lida-Maria Manthopoulou =

Greek Paralympic athlete (born 2005)

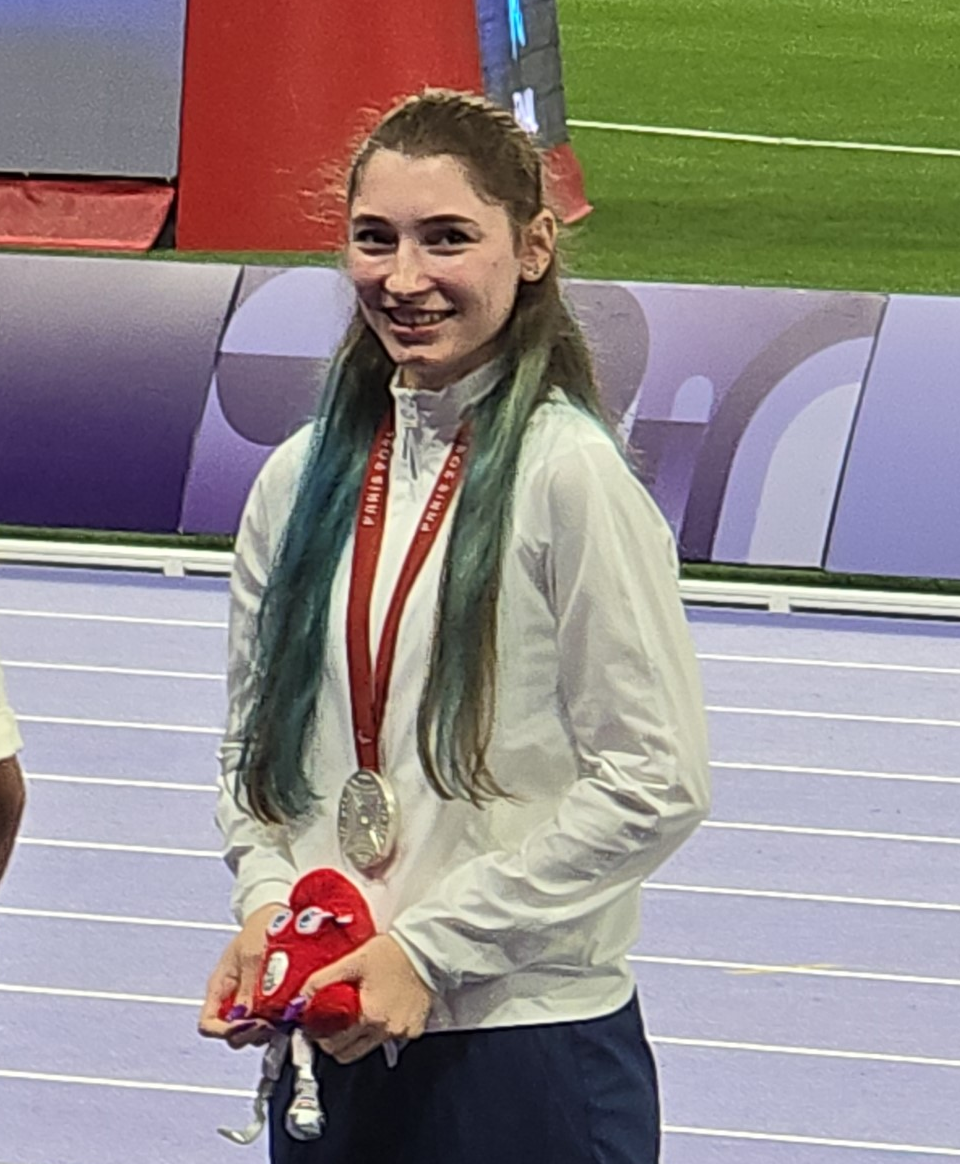
- Manthopoulou at the 2024 Summer Paralympics

Personal information
- Nationality: Greek
- Born: 14 June 2005 (age 21) Athens, Greece

Sport
- Sport: Para-athletics
- Disability class: T38
Medal record
Para-athletics
Representing Greece
Paralympic Games
Silver medal – second place	2024 Paris	100 m T38
World Championships
Bronze medal – third place	2025 New Delhi	100 m T38

Lida-Maria Manthopoulou (born 14 June 2005) is a Greek para-athlete. She represented Greece at the 2024 Summer Paralympics.

== Career ==
Manthopoulou represented Greece at the 2024 Summer Paralympics and won a silver medal in the 100 metres T38 event. She lives in Larissa which is her maternal hails. Her club is Elpides Thessaloniki.

== Personal ==
Manthopoulou suffered from Multiple sclerosis about 1,5 year before the 2024 Summer Paralympics. Her father was the actor Aias Manthopoulos (1962–2023). Her brother Christos is a professional basket player. Her paternal grandmother Evangelia Lelekou-Manthopoulou (1925–2023), was a radiologist and sister of the famous Greek actress Irene Papas (1929–2022). Moreover, the famous director Manousos Manousakis was her uncle.
