= Vinícius Gonçalves Rodrigues =

Brazilian Paralympic athlete

Vinícius Rodrigues
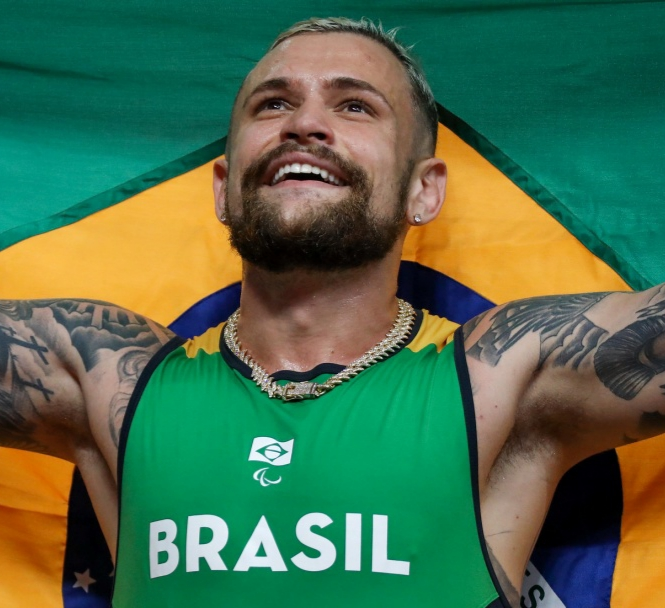
- Rodrigues in 2021

Personal information
- Full name: Vinícius Gonçalves Rodrigues
- Born: 28 November 1994 (age 31) Rosana, São Paulo, Brazil

Sport
- Country: Brazil
- Sport: Para-athletics
- Disability class: T63
Medal record
Paralympic Games
Silver medal – second place	2020 Tokyo	100 m T63
Bronze medal – third place	2024 Paris	100 m T63
World Championships
Silver medal – second place	2023 Paris	100 m T63
Bronze medal – third place	2019 Dubai	100 m T63

Vinícius Gonçalves Rodrigues (Note: This name uses Portuguese naming customs: the first or maternal family name is Gonçalves and the second or paternal family name is Rodrigues.) (born 28 November 1994) is a Brazilian Paralympic athlete. He won the silver medal in the men's 100 metres T63 event at the 2020 Summer Paralympics held in Tokyo, Japan. He also set a new T63 Paralympic record of 12.05 seconds.

== Biography ==
In 2013 at the age of 19, he suffered a motorcycle accident in Maringá, where he lived. His motorcycle was hit by a car and he was thrown, colliding with a road sign.

After the accident, Vinícius had his left leg amputated. Upon receiving a visit from Paralympic champion Terezinha Guilhermina, Vinícius decided to become a professional athlete.

== Career ==
In 2015, he participated in a paralympic competition for the first time, two years after his leg was amputated.

In 2019, during the Open Loterias Caixa paralympic athletics event, he became the world record holder in the 100 metre dash in the T63 class, in the leg amputees category, completing the race in 11 seconds and 95 thousandths, earning with this result the right to represent Brazil in the 2019 Parapan American Games, in Lima, Peru, and the 2019 World Para Athletics Championships, in Dubai, United Arab Emirates. In the same year, he won the bronze medal in the men's 100 metre T63, at the 2019 World Para Athletics Championships.

In 2021, Vinicius competed in his first Paralympics Games, in Tokyo, Japan. And, right on his debut, the sprinter became a silver medalist in men's 100 metre T63 event, losing the race by just one thousandth.

After silver, focus on a new Paralympic cycle. On the way, a new silver medal, this time at the 2023 World Para Athletics Championships in the men's 100 metre T63, in Paris, France.

== Personal life ==
Vinícius is the father of Ana Luiza, aged 7.

In January 2024, it was announced he is a contestant in the reality show Big Brother Brasil 24, giving up the fight to compete in the 2024 Summer Paralympics. He was the 5th evicted with 9.92% of the votes to save in an eviction against salesman Lucas Luigi, social worker Giovanna Pitel, flight attendant Marcus Vinicius Ferreira, and ballet dancer & model Alane Dias, finishing in twenty-first place.

== Filmography ==
Year	Title	Role	Notes
2024	Big Brother Brasil	Himself (Housemate)	Season 24
