= Anton Prokhorov =

Russian Paralympic athlete

Personal information
- Nationality: Russian
- Born: 6 May 1992 (age 34) v. Zyryanka, Ishim district, Tyumen Oblast, Russia

Sport
- Sport: Paralympic athletics
- Disability class: T42
- Event: Sprints
- Club: Tyumen Regional Centre of Sports Preparation
- Turned pro: 2009
- Coached by: Oleg Skamorovsky
Medal record
Para-athletics
Representing RPC
Paralympic Games
Gold medal – first place	2020 Tokyo	100 m T63
Representing Russia
World Championships
Silver medal – second place	2015 Doha	100 m T42
Silver medal – second place	2015 Doha	200 m T42
Bronze medal – third place	2015 Doha	4×100 m T42-47
European Championships
Gold medal – first place	2014 Swansea	200 m T42
Silver medal – second place	2016 Grosseto	100 m T42
Silver medal – second place	2016 Grosseto	4×100 m T42-47
Silver medal – second place	2021 Bydgoszcz	100 m T63
Bronze medal – third place	2014 Swansea	100 m T42
Bronze medal – third place	2016 Grosseto	200 m T42

Anton Yuryevich Prokhorov (Russian: Антон Юрьевич Прохоров; born 6 May 1992) is a Russian para-athlete who specializes in sprints. He is a one-time Paralympic champion.

== Career ==
Born 5 May 1992 in the village of Zyryanka, Ishim district, Tyumen Oblast, Prokhorov lost his left arm in an accident at the age of 10. Before shifting to athletics, Prokhorov practiced futsal since 2002. He started practicing athletics seriously in 2009, when his personal coach became Oleg Skomorovsky.

Prokhorov represented Russian Paralympic Committee athletes at the 2020 Summer Paralympics in the 100 m T63 event where he won a gold medal with a world record time of 12.04.

== Personal life ==
He has a son, Oscar, with his wife Anisa. He is a Master of Sport of International Class.
