= Athletics at the 2024 Summer Paralympics – Women's 800 metres T54 =

Women's 800 metres T54 at the XVII Paralympic Games
- Venue: Stade de France
- Dates: 1 September 2024 (round 1 & final)
- Competitors: 14 from 8 nations
- Winning time: 1:42.36 PR, SB

Medalists
1st place, gold medalist(s)		Manuela Schär	Switzerland
2nd place, silver medalist(s)		Zhou Zhaoqian	China
3rd place, bronze medalist(s)		Susannah Scaroni	United States

800 metres
Men's · T34 · T53 · T54 · Women's · T34 · T53 · T54

The women's 800 metres T54 event at the 2024 Summer Paralympics in Paris, took place on 2024.

The T54 category is for wheelchair athletes with no leg function, but near full arm function and reasonable to normal trunk function. Typically this may be caused by a lower spinal cord injury or spinal cord birth defect.

== Records ==
Prior to the competition, the existing records were as follows:

World Record	Manuela Schär (SUI)	1:41.47	(Switzerland) Nottwil	18 August 2019
Paralympic Record	Manuela Schär (SUI)	1:42.81	(Japan) Tokyo	29 August 2021

Area	Time		Athlete	Location	Date
Africa	1:45.29		(Mauritius) Noemi Alphonse	(Switzerland) Nottwil	25 May 2023
America	1:42.72		(United States) Tatyana McFadden	(Switzerland) Arbon	4 June 2015
Asia	1:42.38		(China) Zou Lihong	(Switzerland) Arbon	2 June 2019
Europe	1:41.47	WR	(Switzerland) Manuela Schär	(Switzerland) Nottwil	18 August 2019
Oceania	1:42.35		(Australia) Eliza Ault-Connell	(Switzerland) Arbon	2 June 2019

== Results ==
=== Round 1 ===
First 3 in each heat (Q) and the next 2 fastest (q) advance to the Final.

==== Heat 1 ====
Rank	Athlete	Nation	Time	Notes
1	Lea Bayekula	Belgium	1:45.42	Q
2	Manuela Schär	Switzerland	1:45.62	Q
3	Melanie Woods	Great Britain	1:45.81	Q, PB
4	Hannah Dederick	United States	1:46.30	q, PB
5	Tian Yajuan	China	1:47.48	q, SB
6	Merle Menje	Germany	1:52.83	
7	Aline Rocha	Brazil	1:53.04	

==== Heat 2 ====
Rank	Athlete	Nation	Time	Notes
1	Tatyana McFadden	United States	1:47.22	Q
2	Susannah Scaroni	United States	1:47.37	Q
3	Zhou Zhaoqian	China	1:47.47	Q, SB
4	Patricia Eachus	Switzerland	1:47.60	
5	Vanessa Cristina de Souza	Brazil	1:50.29	
6	Noemi Alphonse	Mauritius	1:51.04	
7	Jéssica Gabrieli Soares Giacomelli	Brazil	1:59.55	

=== Final ===
Rank	Athlete	Nation	Time	Notes
1st place, gold medalist(s)	Manuela Schär	Switzerland	1:42.36	PR, SB
2nd place, silver medalist(s)	Zhou Zhaoqian	China	1:43.24	PB
3rd place, bronze medalist(s)	Susannah Scaroni	United States	1:43.42	
4	Tatyana McFadden	United States	1:43.58	SB
5	Lea Bayekula	Belgium	1:43.63	PB
6	Melanie Woods	Great Britain	1:43.85	PB
7	Hannah Dederick	United States	1:48.20	
8	Tian Yajuan	China	1:48.49	
