= Athletics at the 2024 Summer Paralympics – Women's 800 metres T34 =

Women's 800 metres T34 at the XVII Paralympic Games
- Venue: Stade de France
- Dates: 7 September 2024
- Competitors: 8 from 4 nations
- Winning time: 1:55.44

Medalists
1st place, gold medalist(s)		Hannah Cockroft	Great Britain
2nd place, silver medalist(s)		Kare Adenegan	Great Britain
3rd place, bronze medalist(s)		Eva Houston	United States

800 metres
Men's · T34 · T53 · T54 · Women's · T34 · T53 · T54

The women's 800 metres T34 event at the 2024 Summer Paralympics in Paris, took place on 7 September 2024.

The T34 category is for wheelchair athletes with cerebral palsy. Athletes in this category have minimal limitations or control problems in their arms and trunk while pushing a wheelchair.

== Records ==
Prior to the competition, the existing records were as follows:

World Record	Hannah Cockroft (GBR)	1:44.43	(United Arab Emirates) Sharjah	20 February 2023
Paralympic Record	Hannah Cockroft (GBR)	1:48.99	(Japan) Tokyo	4 September 2021

Area	Time		Athlete	Location	Date
Africa	Vacant				
America	2:01.35		(United States) Alexa Halko	(United Arab Emirates) Dubai	14 November 2019
Asia	2:09.33		(China) Lan Hanyu	(China) Hangzhou	24 October 2023
Europe	1:44.43	WR	(United Kingdom) Hannah Cockroft	(United Arab Emirates) Sharjah	20 February 2023
Oceania	2:04.10		(Australia) Rosemary Little	(Brazil) Rio de Janeiro	16 September 2016

== Results ==
=== Final ===
Rank	Athlete	Nation	Time	Notes
1st place, gold medalist(s)	Hannah Cockroft	Great Britain	1:55.44	
2nd place, silver medalist(s)	Kare Adenegan	Great Britain	2:03.12	
3rd place, bronze medalist(s)	Eva Houston	United States	2:05.94	
4	Fabienne Andre	Great Britain	2:06.86	
5	Lan Hanyu	China	2:11.97	
6	Moe Onodera	Japan	2:15.85	SB
7	Liu Panpan	China	2:18.82	
8	Lauren Fields	United States	2:33.51	
