= Austin Smeenk =

Canadian paralympic wheelchair racer

Personal information
- Born: February 24, 1997 (age 29)
- Home town: Oakville, Ontario, Canada

Sport
- Country: Canada
- Sport: Para athletics
- Disability class: T34
- Event: Wheelchair racing
- Coached by: Geoff Harris

Achievements and titles
- Personal best(s): 400 m: 48.38 (2024); 800 m: 1:47.61 (2016)
Medal record
Men's wheelchair racing
Representing Canada
Paralympic Games
Gold medal – first place	2024 Paris	800 m T34
Bronze medal – third place	2024 Paris	100 m T34
World Championships
Silver medal – second place	2023 Paris	100 m T34
Bronze medal – third place	2023 Paris	400 m T34
Bronze medal – third place	2025 New Delhi	400 m T34
Bronze medal – third place	2025 New Delhi	800 m T34

Austin Smeenk (born February 24, 1997) is a Canadian wheelchair racer. He competed at the 2016, 2020 and 2024 Summer Paralympics, winning the bronze medal in the men's 100 m T34 event.
