= Chaiwat Rattana =

Thai Paralympic athlete (born 1996)

Personal information
- Native name: ชัยวัฒน์ รัตนะ
- Nationality: Thailand
- Born: 28 May 1996 (age 30) Chonburi, Thailand

Sport
- Sport: Para-athletics
- Disability class: T34
- Event: 100 metres
Medal record
Para-athletics
Representing Thailand
Paralympic Games
Gold medal – first place	2024 Paris	100 m T34
Silver medal – second place	2024 Paris	800 m T34
World Championships
Gold medal – first place	2023 Paris	100 m T34
Gold medal – first place	2023 Paris	400 m T34
Gold medal – first place	2025 New Delhi	100m T34
Gold medal – first place	2025 New Delhi	400m T34
Silver medal – second place	2025 New Delhi	800m T34
Asian Para Games
Gold medal – first place	2018 Jakarta	100 m T34
Gold medal – first place	2022 Hangzhou	100 m T34

Chaiwat Rattana (Thai: ชัยวัฒน์ รัตนะ; born 28 May 1996) is a Thai T34 Paralympic wheelchair racer. He competes in sprint and middle-distance events, including the 100 metres, 400 metres and 800 metres. He represented Thailand at the 2020 and 2024 Summer Paralympics, winning gold in the 100 metres T34 and silver in the 800 metres T34 at the 2024 Games. Rattana is also a multiple gold medallist at the World Para Athletics Championships.

== Career ==
Rattana competed at the 2018 Asian Para Games in Jakarta, where he won the men's 100 metres T34 in 16.25 seconds.

He made his Paralympic debut at the 2020 Summer Paralympics in Tokyo. In the men's 100 metres T34, he finished sixth in the final with a time of 15.87 seconds. He also competed in the men's 800 metres T34, finishing fifth in his heat in 1:53.75.

At the 2023 World Para Athletics Championships in Paris, Rattana won gold medals in the men's 100 metres T34 and 400 metres T34. He won the 100 metres in 15.01 seconds, setting an Asian record, and the 400 metres in 48.65 seconds, setting a world record.

At the 2024 Summer Paralympics in Paris, Rattana won the gold medal in the men's 100 metres T34, setting a Paralympic Games record of 14.76 seconds. He also won silver in the men's 800 metres T34 with a time of 1:39.48.

At the 2025 World Para Athletics Championships in New Delhi, Rattana won gold medals in the men's 400 metres T34 and 100 metres T34, and a silver medal in the 800 metres T34.

== Major results ==
Year	Venue	Event	Heat		Final		Rank
Year	Venue	Event	Time	Rank	Time	Rank	Rank
Paralympic Games
2020	Tokyo, Japan	100 m T34	—		15.87	6	6
2020	Tokyo, Japan	800 m T34	1:53.75	5	Did not advance		—
2024	Paris, France	100 m T34	14.81	1 Q	14.76 PR	1	1st place, gold medalist(s)
2024	Paris, France	800 m T34	1:38.61	2 Q	1:39.48	2	2nd place, silver medalist(s)
World Championships
2023	Paris, France	100 m T34	15.11 AR	1 Q	15.01 AR	1	1st place, gold medalist(s)
2023	Paris, France	400 m T34	49.00 CR	1 Q	48.65 WR	1	1st place, gold medalist(s)
2023	Paris, France	800 m T34	1:37.88 CR	1 Q	1:40.63	6	6
2025	New Delhi, India	100 m T34	14.71 CR	1 Q	15.00	1	1st place, gold medalist(s)
2025	New Delhi, India	400 m T34	47.94 WR	1 Q	48.01	1	1st place, gold medalist(s)
2025	New Delhi, India	800 m T34	—		1:40.37	2	2nd place, silver medalist(s)
