= Mohamed Nidhal Khelifi =

Tunisian para-athlete (born 1996)

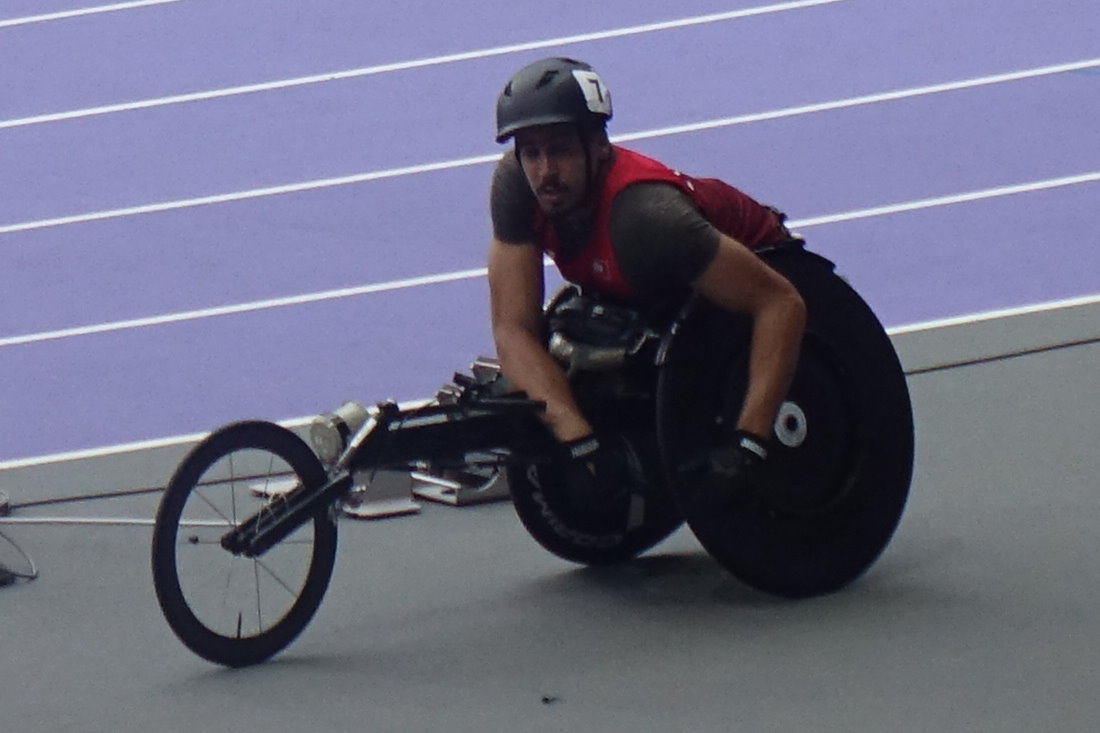
- Khelifi at the 2024 Summer Paralympics

Personal information
- Nationality: Tunisian
- Born: 12 August 1996 (age 29)

Sport
- Sport: Para-athletics
- Disability class: T53
- Event: Wheelchair racing
Medal record
Men's para-athletics
Representing Tunisia
World Championships
| Silver medal – second place | 2024 Kobe | 800 m T53 |
| Silver medal – second place | 2025 New Delhi | 800 m T20 |
| Bronze medal – third place | 2024 Kobe | 100 m T53 |
| Bronze medal – third place | 2024 Kobe | 400 m T53 |

Mohamed Nidhal Khelifi (born 12 August 1996) is a Tunisian T53 wheelchair racer. He represented Tunisia at the 2024 Summer Paralympics.

== Career ==
In May 2024, Khelifi competed at the 2024 World Para Athletics Championships and won a silver medal in the 800 metre T53 event, and bronze medals in the 100 metres T53 and 400 metres T53 events. He then represented Tunisia at the 2024 Summer Paralympics and finished in seventh place in the 100 metres T53 event and eighth place in the 800 metres T53 event with an area record time of 1:42.50.

He competed at the 2025 World Para Athletics Championships and won a silver medal in the 800 metre T53 event with an African record time of 1:37.15.
