= Nalani Buob =

Swiss wheelchair tennis player

- Born: 2 February 2001 (age 25) Baar, Switzerland
- Plays: Left-handed (one-handed backhand)

Singles
- Career titles: 19
- Highest ranking: No. 19 (10 January 2022)
- Current ranking: No. 32 (20 January 2025)

Other tournaments
- Paralympic Games: 1R (2020, 2024)

Doubles
- Career titles: 19
- Highest ranking: No. 18 (21 February 2022)
- Current ranking: No. 37 (20 January 2025)

Nalani Buob (born 2 February 2001) is a Swiss wheelchair tennis player of Indian descent. She is a former junior world number one in October 2016.

Buob took up wheelchair tennis aged ten. She is inspired by her tennis idol and hero Martina Hingis.
