= Jin Hua (athlete) =

Chinese Paralympic athlete

Personal information
- Native name: 金华
- Nationality: Chinese
- Born: 20 October 1999 (age 26)

Sport
- Country: China
- Sport: Wheelchair racing
- Disability class: T54
Medal record
Men's para-athletics
Representing China
Paralympic Games
Gold medal – first place	2024 Paris	800 m T54
Gold medal – first place	2024 Paris	1500 m F54
Silver medal – second place	2024 Paris	Marathon T54
World Championships
Gold medal – first place	2024 Kobe	1500 m T54
Gold medal – first place	2025 New Delhi	800 m T54
Gold medal – first place	2025 New Delhi	1500 m T54

Jin Hua ( Chinese: 金华)(born 20 October 1999) is a Chinese wheelchair racer. He represented China at the 2024 Summer Paralympics. He is a two-time Paralympic Games champion and three-time World Champion.

== Career ==
In May 2024, Jin represented China at the 2024 World Para Athletics Championships and won a gold medal in the 1500 metres T54 event. He then represented China at the 2024 Summer Paralympics and won a gold medal in the 1500 m F54 event.
