= Switzerland at the 2024 Summer Paralympics =

- Flag of Switzerland
- IPC code: SUI
- NPC: Swiss Paralympic Committee
- Website: www.swissparalympic.ch

in Paris, France August 28, 2024 – September 8, 2024
- Competitors: 27 in 9 sports
- Flag bearers: Marcel Hug; Elena Kratter
- Medals Ranked 15th: Gold 8 Silver 8 Bronze 5 Total 21

Summer Paralympics appearances (overview)
- 1960; 1964; 1968; 1972; 1976; 1980; 1984; 1988; 1992; 1996; 2000; 2004; 2008; 2012; 2016; 2020; 2024

Switzerland competed at the 2024 Summer Paralympics in Paris, France, from 28 August to 8 September.

== Competitors ==
The following is the list of number of competitors in the Games.

Sport	Men	Women	Total
Athletics	3	7	10
Badminton	1	2	3
Cycling	3	4	7
Equestrian	0	1	1
Judo	0	1	1
Rowing	0	1	1
Shooting	0	1	1
Swimming	1	1	2
Wheelchair tennis	0	1	1
Total	8	19	27

== Athletics ==
Swiss track and field athletes achieved quota places for the following events based on their results at the 2023 World Championships, 2024 World Championships, or through high performance allocation, as long as they meet the minimum entry standard (MES).

Key

- Note–Ranks given for track events are within the athlete's heat only
- Q = Qualified for the next round
- q = Qualified for the next round as a fastest loser or, in field events, by position without achieving the qualifying target
- DQ = Disqualified
- PR = Paralympic Record
- AR = Area (or continental) Record
- NR = National Record
- SB = Season's Best
- N/A = Round not applicable for the event
- Bye = Athlete not required to compete in round

Men's track

Athlete	Event	Heat		Final	
Athlete	Event	Result	Rank	Result	Rank
Fabian Blum	100 m T52				
Fabian Blum	400 m T52	1:04.08	2 Q	1:03.71	5
Beat Bösch	100 m T52				
Beat Bösch	400 m T52	1:06.65	5	Did not advance	
Marcel Hug	800 m T54				
Marcel Hug	1500 m T54				
Marcel Hug	5000 m T54	10:35.08	1 Q		2nd place, silver medalist(s)
Marcel Hug	Marathon T54	—N/a			

Women's track

Athlete	Event	Heat		Final	
Athlete	Event	Result	Rank	Result	Rank
Catherine Debrunner	100 m T53				
Catherine Debrunner	400 m T53				
Catherine Debrunner	800 m T54				1st place, gold medalist(s)
Catherine Debrunner	1500 m T54				1st place, gold medalist(s)
Catherine Debrunner	5000 m T54	12:43.82	1 Q	10:43.62	1st place, gold medalist(s)
Catherine Debrunner	Marathon T54	—N/a			
Patricia Eachus	400 m T54				
Patricia Eachus	800 m T54				
Patricia Eachus	1500 m T54				
Patricia Eachus	5000 m T54	11:45.43	3 Q	11:10.44	4
Patricia Eachus	Marathon T54	—N/a			
Alexandra Helbling	100 m T54				
Alexandra Helbling	400 m T54				
Elena Kratter	100 m T64				
Licia Mussinelli	100 m T54				
Licia Mussinelli	400 m T54				
Abassia Rahmani	100 m T64				
Manuela Schär	400 m T54				
Manuela Schär	800 m T54				1st place, gold medalist(s)
Manuela Schär	1500 m T54				
Manuela Schär	5000 m T54	12:44.20	3 Q	11:10.52	5
Manuela Schär	Marathon T54	—N/a			

Field events

Athlete	Event	Final	
Athlete	Event	Distance	Position
Elena Kratter	Women's long jump T63		

== Badminton ==
Cynthia Mathez, Ilaria Renggli and Luca Olgiati have all qualified to compete.

Athlete	Event	Group stage				Quarterfinal	Semifinal	Final / BM	
Athlete	Event	Opposition Score	Opposition Score	Opposition Score	Rank	Opposition Score	Opposition Score	Opposition Score	Rank
Luca Olgiati	Men's singles WH2			—N/a		—N/a			
Cynthia Mathez	Women's singles WH1								
Ilaria Renggli	Women's singles WH2								3rd place, bronze medalist(s)
Cynthia Mathez; Ilaria Renggli	Women's doubles WH1–2	Hu G-c / Yang I-c (TPE); W (21–10, 21–19)		—N/a		—N/a			

== Cycling ==
Benjamin Früh, Franziska Matile-Dörig, Fabian Recher, Flurina Rigling, Sandra Stöckli, Celine van Till and Timothy Zemp have all qualified to compete.

=== Track ===
Men

Athlete	Event	Qualification		Final	
Athlete	Event	Time	Rank	Opposition Time	Rank
Timothy Zemp	Men's individual pursuit C4	4:39.881	9	Did not advance	
Timothy Zemp	Men's time trial C4–5	1:09.053	18	Did not advance	

Women

Athlete	Event	Qualification		Final	
Athlete	Event	Time	Rank	Opposition Time	Rank
Flurina Rigling	Women's individual pursuit C1–3	3:50.347	4 QB	3:48.512	3rd place, bronze medalist(s)
Flurina Rigling	Women's time trial C1–3	41.510	9	Did not advance	
Franziska Matile-Doerig	Women's time trial C4–5	39.414	9	Did not advance	
Franziska Matile-Doerig	Women's pursuit C4	3:47.142	5	Did not advance	

== Equestrian ==
Switzerland entered one para-equestrian into the Paralympic equestrian competition, by virtue of the nations individual final world para dressage rankings.

Individual

Athlete	Horse	Event	Total	
Athlete	Horse	Event	Score	Rank
Nicole Geiger	Donar Weltino	Individual championship test grade V		
Nicole Geiger	Donar Weltino	Individual freestyle test grade V		

== Judo ==
Carmen Brussig has qualified to compete.

== Rowing ==
Switzerland qualified one boats in women's single sculls classes, by virtue of the gold medal results, at the 2024 European Continental Qualification Regatta in Szeged, Hungary.

Athlete	Event	Heats		Repechage		Final	
Athlete	Event	Time	Rank	Time	Rank	Time	Rank
Claire Ghiringhelli	PR1 women's single sculls	11:05.32	3 R	11:00.83	3 FB		

Qualification Legend: FA=Final A (medal); FB=Final B (non-medal); R=Repechage

== Shooting ==
Switzerland entered one para-shooter after achieved quota places for the following events by virtue of their best finishes at the 2022, 2023 and 2024 world cup, 2022 World Championships, 2023 World Championships, 2023 European Para Championships and 2024 European Championships, as long as they obtained a minimum qualifying score (MQS) by May 31, 2020.

Mixed

Athlete	Event	Qualification		Final	
Athlete	Event	Points	Rank	Points	Rank
Nicole Häusler	R4 – 10m air rifle standing SH2				
Nicole Häusler	R5 – 10 m air rifle prone SH2				
Nicole Häusler	R9 – 50 m rifle prone SH2				

== Swimming ==
Switzerland secured two quotas at the 2023 World Para Swimming Championships after finishing in the top two places in Paralympic class disciplines.

Athlete	Event	Heats		Final	
Athlete	Event	Result	Rank	Result	Rank
Leo McCrea	Men's 100 m breastroke SB5				1st place, gold medalist(s)
Leo McCrea	Men's 200 m individual medley SM6				
Nora Meister	Women's 50 m freestyle S6	35.71	6 Q		
Nora Meister	Women's 400 m freestyle S6				
Nora Meister	Women's 100 m backstroke S6				

== Wheelchair tennis ==
Nalani Buob has qualified to compete.

Athlete	Event	Round of 64	Round of 32	Round of 16	Quarterfinals	Semifinals	Final / BM	
Athlete	Event	Opposition Result	Opposition Result	Opposition Result	Opposition Result	Opposition Result	Opposition Result	Rank
Nalani Buob	Women's singles	—N/a	van Koot (NED); L 5-12	Did not advance				

== See also ==
- Switzerland at the 2024 Summer Olympics
- Switzerland at the Paralympics
