= Tunisia at the 2024 Summer Paralympics =

- Flag of Tunisia
- IPC code: TUN
- NPC: Tunisian Paralympic Committee

in Paris, France August 28, 2024 – September 8, 2024
- Competitors: 30 in 4 sports
- Flag bearer: Mohamed Farhat Chida
- Medals Ranked 27th: Gold 5 Silver 3 Bronze 3 Total 11

Summer Paralympics appearances (overview)
- 1988; 1992; 1996; 2000; 2004; 2008; 2012; 2016; 2020; 2024

Tunisia competed at the 2024 Summer Paralympics in Paris, France, from 28 August to 8 September, 2024.

== Medalists ==
| Medal | Name | Sport | Event | Date |
|---|---|---|---|---|
| Gold | Raoua Tlili | Athletics | Women's shot put F41 | 30 August |
| Gold | Maroua Brahmi | Athletics | Women's club throw F32 | 30 August |
| Gold | Raoua Tlili | Athletics | Women's discus throw F41 | 4 September |
| Gold | Amen Allah Tissaoui | Athletics | Men's 1500 m T38 | 7 September |
| Gold | Wajdi Boukhili | Athletics | Men's Marathon T12 | 8 September |
| Silver | Ahmed Ben Moslah | Athletics | Men's shot put F37 | 30 August |
| Silver | Walid Ktila | Athletics | Men's 100 m T34 | 2 September |
| Silver | Rouay Jebabli | Athletics | Men's 1500 m T13 | 3 September |
| Bronze | Amen Allah Tissaoui | Athletics | Men's 400 m T37 | 4 September |
| Bronze | Rouay Jebabli | Athletics | Men's 400 m T12 | 5 September |
| Bronze | Raja Jebali | Athletics | Women's shot put F40 | 7 September |

== Competitors ==
The following is the list of number of competitors in the Games.

| Sport | Men | Women | Total |
|---|---|---|---|
| Athletics | 13 | 12 | 25 |
| Boccia | 2 | 1 | 3 |
| Rowing | 1 | 0 | 1 |
| Paratriathlon | 1 | 0 | 1 |
| Total | 17 | 13 | 30 |

== Athletics ==
Tunisian track and field athletes achieved quota places for the following events based on their results at the 2023 World Championships, 2024 World Championships, or through high performance allocation, as long as they meet the minimum entry standard (MES).

Key

- Note–Ranks given for track events are within the athlete's heat only
- Q = Qualified for the next round
- q = Qualified for the next round as a fastest loser or, in field events, by position without achieving the qualifying target
- DQ = Disqualified
- WR = World Record
- PR = Paralympic Record
- AR = Area (or continental) Record
- NR = National Record
- SB = Season's Best
- N/A = Round not applicable for the event
- Bye = Athlete not required to compete in round

Track & road events

| Athlete | Event | Heat | | Final | |
| Athlete | Event | Result | Rank | Result | Rank |
|---|---|---|---|---|---|
| Rouay Jebabli | Men's 400 m T12 | 48.82 | 1 Q | 49.56 | 3rd place, bronze medalist(s) |
| Rouay Jebabli | Men's 1500 m T13 | —N/a | | 3:44.67 AR | 2nd place, silver medalist(s) |
| Walid Ktila | Men's 100 m T34 | 15.09 | 2 Q | 15.14 | 2nd place, silver medalist(s) |
| Walid Ktila | Men's 800 m T34 | 1:44.60 | 1 Q | 1:41.07 | 5 |
| Mohamed Nidhal Khelifi | Men's 100 m T53 | 15.60 | 3 Q | 15.50 | 7 |
| Mohamed Nidhal Khelifi | Men's 400 m T53 | 52.01 | 5 | Did not advance | |
| Mohamed Nidhal Khelifi | Men's 800 m T53 | —N/a | | 1:42.50 | 8 |
| Yassine Gharbi | Men's 400 m T54 | 46.23 | 3 Q | 45.99 | 5 |
| Yassine Gharbi | Men's 800 m T54 | 1:36.30 | 4 | Did not advance | |
| Yassine Gharbi | Men's 1500 m T54 | 2:57.48 | 4 Q | 2:54.27 | 8 |
| Bechir Agoubi | Men's 1500 m T46 | —N/a | | 4:09.72 | 13 |
| Amen Allah Tissaoui | Men's 400 m T37 | 51.59 | 1 Q | 50.50 AR | 3rd place, bronze medalist(s) |
| Amen Allah Tissaoui | Men's 1500 m T38 | —N/a | | 4:12.91 | 1st place, gold medalist(s) |
| Wajdi Boukhili | Men's Marathon T12 | —N/a | | 2:22:05 | 1st place, gold medalist(s) |
| Hatem Nasrallah | Men's Marathon T12 | —N/a | | 2:27:58 | 5 |
| Neda Bahi | Women's 400 m T37 | —N/a | | 1:11.52 | 7 |
| Somaya Bousaid | Women's 1500 m T13 | —N/a | | 4:34.87 | 5 |

Field events

| Athlete | Event | Final | |
| Athlete | Event | Distance | Position |
|---|---|---|---|
| Mohamed Farhat Chida | Men's long jump T38 | 6.00 | 7 |
| Wassim Salhi | Men's shot put F32 | 7.85 | 9 |
| Wassim Salhi | Men's club throw F32 | 33.24 | 7 |
| Oussama Sassi | Men's shot put F33 | 10.43 | 7 |
| Yassine Guenichi | Men's shot put F36 | 15.84 | 4 |
| Ahmed Ben Moslah | Men's shot put F37 | 15.40 | 2nd place, silver medalist(s) |
| Raoua Tlili | Women's discus throw F41 | 36.55 | 1st place, gold medalist(s) |
| Raoua Tlili | Women's shot put F41 | 10.40 | 1st place, gold medalist(s) |
| Samar Ben Koelleb | Women's discus throw F41 | 28.63 PB | 5 |
| Samar Ben Koelleb | Women's shot put F41 | 8.56 | 6 |
| Fathia Amaimia | Women's discus throw F41 | 27.37 | 8 |
| Saida Nayli | Women's shot put F32 | 4.80 | 11 |
| Maroua Ibrahmi | Women's shot put F32 | 5.81 | 8 |
| Maroua Ibrahmi | Women's club throw F32 | 29.00 WR | 1st place, gold medalist(s) |
| Sawsen Ben Mbarek | Women's shot put F34 | 6.93 | 7 |
| Sawsen Ben Mbarek | Women's javelin throw F34 | 14.97 | 9 |
| Yousra Ben Jemaa | Women's javelin throw F34 | 17.20 | 4 |
| Raja Jebali | Women's shot put F40 | 8.66 | 3rd place, bronze medalist(s) |
| Nourhein Belhaj Salem | Women's shot put F40 | 7.80 | 7 |
| Jihen Azaiez | Women's shot put F46 | 11.01 | 6 |

== Boccia ==
Tunisia entered three athletes into the Paralympics games, by virtue of their result as the highest rank nation's in the BC1/BC2 team event, at the 2023 Africa Regional Championship in Cairo, marking the country debut at the sport.

| Athlete | Event | Pool matches | | | | | | Semifinals | Final / BM | |
| Athlete | Event | Opposition Score | Opposition Score | Opposition Score | Opposition Score | Opposition Score | Rank | Opposition Score | Opposition Score | Rank |
|---|---|---|---|---|---|---|---|---|---|---|
| Maha Aounallah | Women's individual BC1 | Basic (CRO); L 0-19 | Zhang (CHN); L 0-19 | —N/a | | | 3 | Did not advance | | |
| Ayed Ben Youb | Men's individual BC2 | Saehgampa (THA); L 1–13 | Rombouts (BEL); L 0-7 | Seo (KOR); W 6-4 | —N/a | | 3 | Did not advance | | |
| Achraf Tayahi | Men's individual BC2 | Santos (BRA); L 0–8 (DNS) | Levi (ISR); L 0–8 (DNS) | Dekker (NED); L 0–8 (DNS) | —N/a | | 4 | Did not advance | | |
| Achraf Tayahi; Ayed Ben Youb; Maha Aounallah | Mixed team BC1–BC2 | South Korea; L 1-19 | Japan; L 1-11 | —N/a | | | 3 | Did not advance | | |

== Paratriathlon ==
Men

| Athlete | Class | Swim | T1 | Bike | T2 | Run | Time | Rank |
| Athlete | Class | Swim | T1 | L1 | T2 | L1 | Time | Rank |
|---|---|---|---|---|---|---|---|---|
| Fathi Zwoukhi | Men's PTWC | 13:29 | 1:16 | 37:26 | 0:51 | 12:47 | 1:05:49 | 7 |

== Rowing ==
Tunisia qualified one boats in men's single sculls classes, by winning the 2023 African Continental Qualification Regatta in Tunis, Tunisia.

| Athlete | Event | Heats | | Repechage | | Final | |
| Athlete | Event | Time | Rank | Time | Rank | Time | Rank |
|---|---|---|---|---|---|---|---|
| Maher Rahmani | PR1 men's single sculls | 10:07.38 | 5 R | DNS | | Did not advance | |

Qualification Legend: FA=Final A (medal); FB=Final B (non-medal); R=Repechage

== See also ==
- Tunisia at the 2024 Summer Olympics
- Tunisia at the Paralympics
