= T53 (classification) =

Para-athletics classification

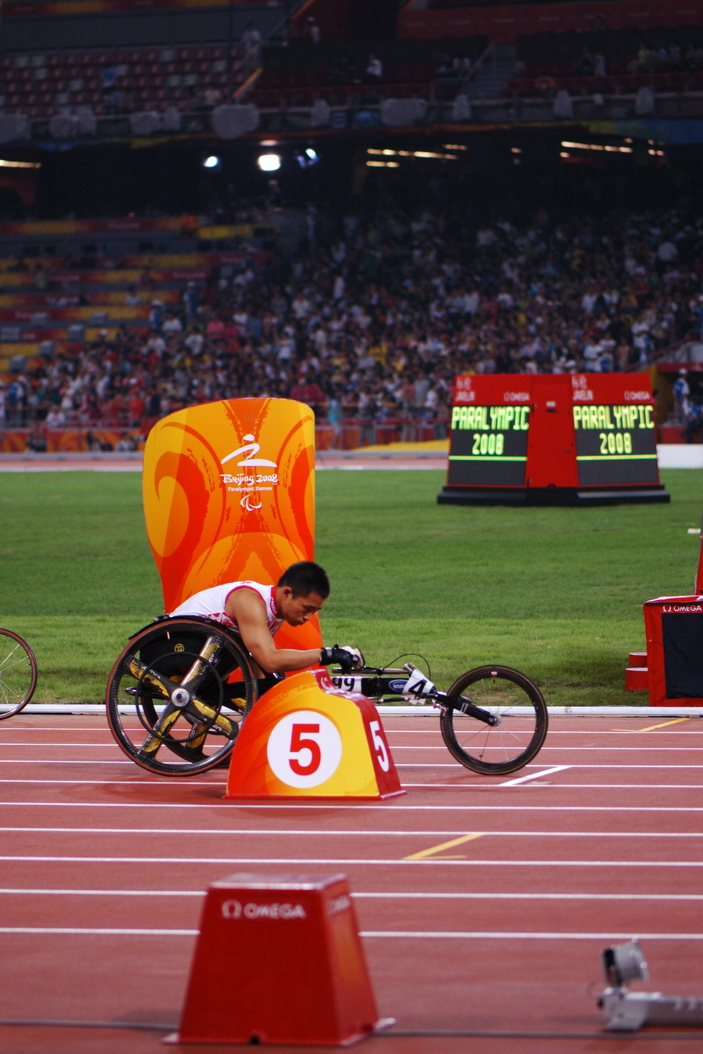
Shiran Yu is a T53 competitor

T53 is disability sport classification for disability athletics. The class includes people with a number of different types of disabilities including spinal cord injuries. People in this class have full use of their arms but have no or limited trunk function. Similar classifications are T51, T52, and T54. People in this class have a functional upper limbs, but limited trunk usage and limited lower limb functionality. During classification, they both undergo a bench test of muscle strength and demonstrate their skills in athletics. People in this class include Tanni Grey-Thompson (GBR), Samantha Kinghorn (GBR), Angie Ballard (AUS) and Richard Colman (AUS).

== Definition ==
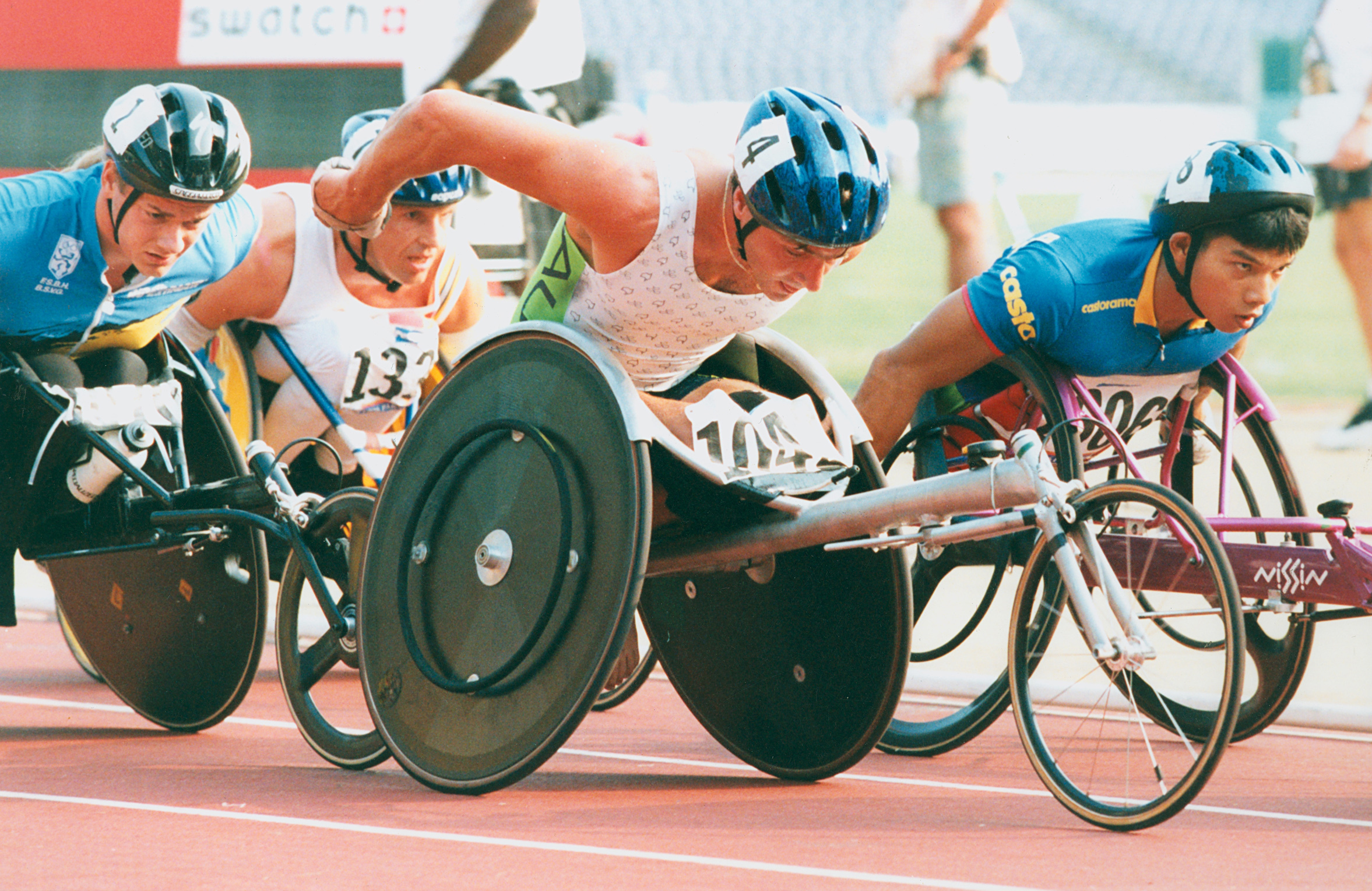
Australian Paul Wiggins is a T53 competitor

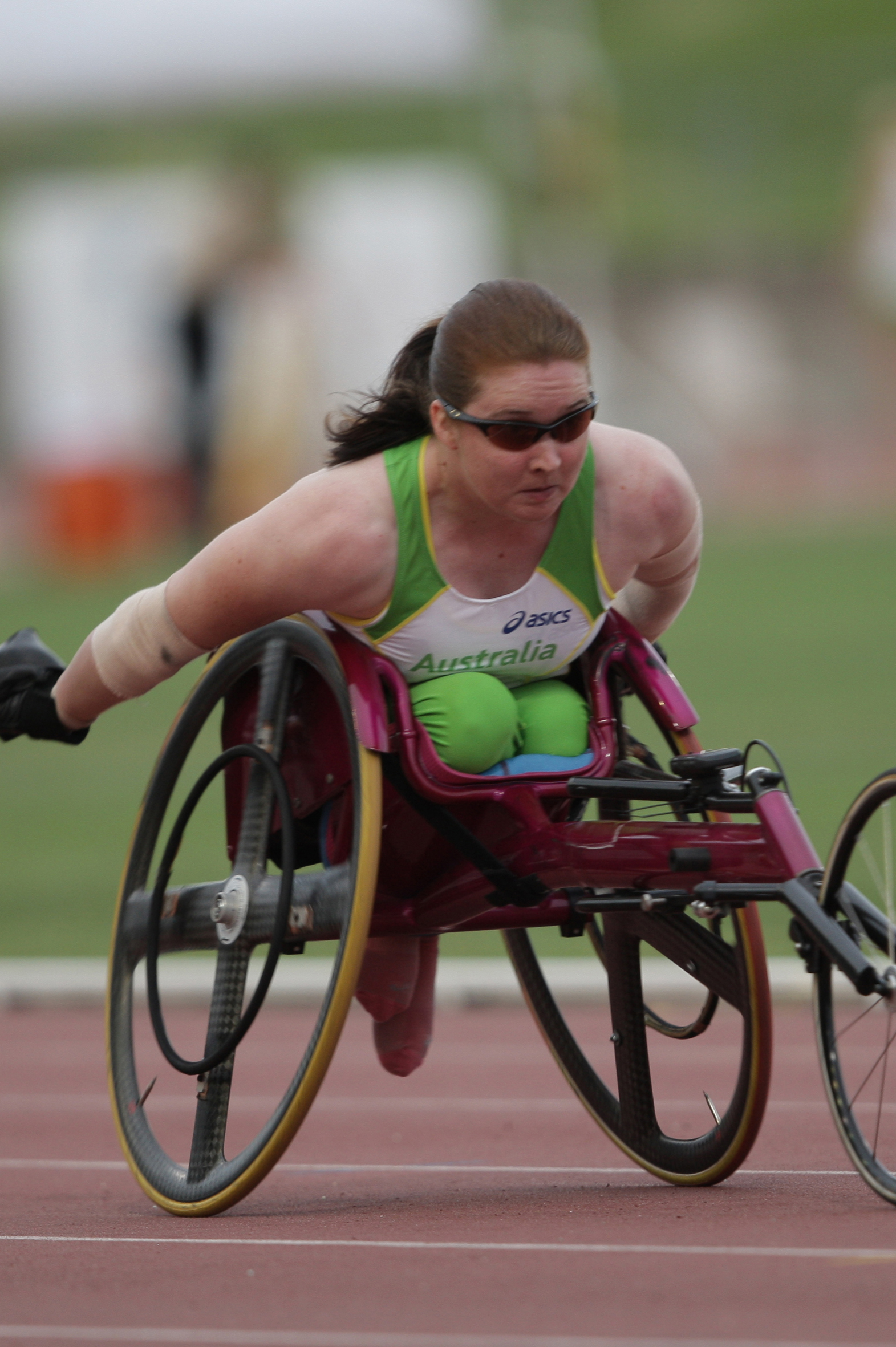
Angie Ballard is a T53 competitor

This classification is for disability athletics. This classification is one of several classifications for athletes with spinal cord injuries. Similar classifications are T51, T52, T53 and T54. Jane Buckley, writing for the Sporting Wheelies, describes the athletes in this classification as: " Wheelchair athlete with normal arms and hands. No or limited trunk function. No leg function." The Australian Paralympic Committee defines this classification as being for "Athletes with normal upper limb function, with no abdominal or lower spinal strength (poor sitting balance). Some interference in their ability to perform long and forceful strokes. E.g. high level paraplegia." The International Paralympic Committee defined this class in 2011 as "These athletes will have normal arm muscle power with no abdominal or lower spinal muscle activity. Use different techniques to compensate for lack of abdominal musculature including lying horizontal. When the paces quickens in a race, their acceleration is slower than the T54 class. In general when acceleration occurs, the trunk rises off the legs due to a lack of abdominal muscles to hold the trunk down. Usually have to interrupt the pushing cycle to adjust the compensator. Equivalent activity limitation to person with complete cord injury at cord level T1-7."

The International Paralympic Committee defined this classification on their website in July 2016 as, " Athletes typically have full function of the arms but no abdominal or lower spinal muscle activity (grade 0)". For the related field classification, F53, International Paralympic Committee defined this classification on their website in July 2016,"Athletes have full muscle power at their shoulder, elbow and wrist in the throwing arm. Muscle power in the finger flexor and extensor muscles is functional, but there is always some weakness and resulting wasting of the intrinsic muscles of the hand. The grip on the implement is close to able-bodied and force can be imparted to the implement when throwing. The non-throwing hand grips the pole on the throwing frame.. An athlete with partial to full trunk control but with a throwing arm that fits the F52 profile is appropriately placed in this class."

=== Les Autres ===
People who are Les Autres compete in this class. This includes LAF1 and LAF2 classified athletes. In general, Les Autres classes cover sportspeople with locomotor disabilities regardless of their diagnosis.

==== LAF1 ====
LAF1 sportspeople are one of the classes that can compete in F51, F52 and F53. F51, F52 and F53 are wheelchair athletics classes. They have functionality issues in throwing events as a result of mobility issues or spasticity in their throwing arm. At the 1984 Summer Paralympics, LAF1, LAF2 and LAF3 track athletes had the 60 meters and 400 meter distances on the program. There was a large range of sportspeople with different disabilities in this class at the 1984 Summer Paralympics.

Sportspeople in this class use wheelchairs on a regular basis as a result of reduced muscle function. ACSM's Primary Care Sports Medicine defines LAF1 as a medical class as "[s]evere involvement of the four limbs -- for example, MS, muscular dystrophy (MD), juvenile rheumatoid arthritis (JRA) with contractures" As a functional class, ACSM's Primary Care Sports Medicine defines LAF1 as "use of wheelchair with reduced function of muscle strength and/or spasticity in throwing arm, and poor sitting balance." Medically, this class includes people with severe multiple scleroris, muscular dystrophy, and juvenile rheumatoid arthritis with contractures. This means they have severe issues with all four limbs. In terms of functional classification, this means the sportsperson uses a wheelchair, has poor sitting balance and has reduced strength or spasticity in their throwing arm. Sportspeople with muscular dystrophy in this class have a number of factors that can make sports participation difficult. This includes poor pulmonary function, and potentially having restrictive lung disease values.

==== LAF2 ====
LAF2 sportspeople can class compete in F53. Athletes in this class have normal functioning in their throwing arm. While throwing, they can generally maintain good balance. At the 1984 Summer Paralympics, LAF1, LAF2 and LAF3 track athletes had the 60 meters and 400 meter distances on the program. There was a large range of sportspeople with different disabilities in this class at the 1984 Summer Paralympics.

Sportspeople in this class use wheelchairs on a regular basis as a result of reduced muscle function. They have low to moderate levels of balance issues while sitting, but maintain overall good balance from that position. They have normal arm function. Medically, this class includes people with severe hemiplegia, and paralysis of one limb while having deformations in two other limbs. Functionally, this means they have severe impairment of three limbs, or all four limbs but to a lesser degree than LAF1. In terms of functional classification, this means the sportsperson uses a wheelchair, has moderate sitting balance, reduced limb function in their throwing limb but has good sitting balance while throwing. For the 1984 Summer Paralympics, LAF2 was defined by the Games organizers as, "Wheelchair bound with normal function in throwing arm and poor to no sitting balance."

=== Spinal cord injuries ===
People with spinal cord injuries compete in this class, including F3 sportspeople.

==== F3 ====
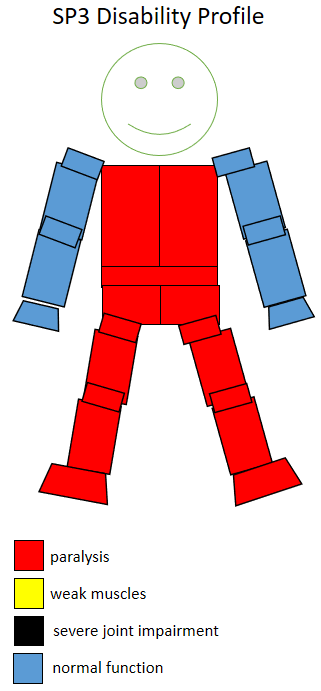
Functional profile of a wheelchair sportsperson in the F3 class.

This is wheelchair sport classification that corresponds to the neurological level C8. In the past, this class was known as 1C Complete, and 1B Incomplete. Disabled Sports USA defined the anatomical definition of this class in 2003 as, "Have full power at elbow and wrist joints. Have full or almost full power of finger flexion and extension. Have functional but not normal intrinsic muscles of the hand (demonstrable wasting)." People with a lesion at C8 have an impairment that effects the use of their hands and lower arm. Disabled Sports USA defined the functional definition of this class in 2003 as, "Have nearly normal grip with non-throwing arm." They have full functional control or close to full functional control over the muscles in their fingers, but may have issues with control in their wrist and hand. People in this class have a total respiratory capacity of 79% compared to people without a disability.

Under the IPC Athletics classification system, this class competes in F53. The class differs from T54 because T54 sportspeople have better trunk function and better function and more strength in their throwing arm. A person in this class with an additional impairment in the elbow of their throwing arm may find themselves classified as F52 instead. Athletes in this class who good trunk control and mobility have an advantage over athletes in the same class who have less functional trunk control and mobility. This functional difference can cause different performance results within the same class, with discus throwers with more control in a class able to throw the discus further. Wheelchair racers in this class frequently are much faster than their non-disabled counterparts.

Field events open to this class have included shot put, discus and javelin. In pentathlon, the events for this class have included Shot, Javelin, 100m, Discus, 800m. They throw from a seated position. The javelin they throw weighs .6 kilograms (1.3 lb). The shot put used by women in this class weighs less than the traditional one at 3 kilograms (6.6 lb). In the United States, people in this class are allowed to use strapping on the non-throwing hand as a way to anchor themselves to the chair.

There are performance differences and similarities between this class and other wheelchair classes. A study of javelin throwers in 2003 found that F3 throwers have angular speeds of the shoulder girdle similar to that of F4, F5, F6, F7, F8 and F9 throwers. A 1999 study found for people in the F2, F3 and F4 classes in the discus, elbow flexion and shoulder horizontal abduction are equally important variables in the speed at which they release the discus. For F2, F3 and F4 discus throwers, the discus tends to be below shoulder height and the forearm level is generally above elbow height at the moment of release of the discus. F2 and F4 discus throwers have limited shoulder girdle range of motion. F2, F3 and F4 discus throwers have good sitting balance while throwing. F5, F6 and F7 discus throwers have greater angular speed of the shoulder girdle during release of the discus than the lower number classes of F2, F3 and F4.

A study of was done comparing the performance of athletics competitors at the 1984 Summer Paralympics. It found there was little significant difference in performance in distance between women in 1A (SP1, SP2) and 1B (SP3) in the club throw. It found there was little significant difference in performance in distance between men in 1A (SP1, SP2) and 1B (SP3) in the club throw. It found there was little significant difference in performance in distance between men in 1A (SP1, SP2) and 1B (SP3) in the discus. It found there was little significant difference in performance in distance between men in 1A (SP1, SP2) and 1B (SP3) in the javelin. It found there was little significant difference in performance in distance between men in 1A (SP1, SP2) and 1B (SP3) in the shot put. It found there was little significant difference in performance in times between women in 1A (SP1, SP2) and 1B (SP3) in the 60 meters. It found there was little significant difference in performance in times between men in 1A (SP1, SP2) and 1B (SP3) in the 60 meters. It found there was little significant difference in performance in times between women in 1A (SP1, SP2) and 1B (SP3) in the slalom. It found there was little significant difference in performance in distance between women in 1B (SP3) and 1C (SP3, SP4) in the shot put. It found there was little significant difference in performance in time between women in 1B (SP3) and 1C (SP3, SP4) in the 60 meter dash. It found there was little significant difference in performance in distance between women in 1A (SP1, SP2), 1B (SP3) and 1C (SP3, SP4) in the discus. It found there was little significant difference in performance in distance between women in 1A (SP1, SP2), 1B (SP3) and 1C (SP3, SP4) in the club throw. It found there was little significant difference in performance in time between women in 1C (SP3, SP4) and 2 (SP4) in the 60 m dash. It found there was little significant difference in performance in distance between men in 1C (SP3, SP4) and 2 (SP4) in the shot put. It found there was little significant difference in performance in time between men in 1C (SP3, SP4) and 2 (SP4) in the slalom. It found there was little significant difference in performance in distance between women in 1C (SP3, SP4), 2 (SP4) and 3 (SP4, SP5) in the javelin. It found there was little significant difference in performance in time between women in 1C (SP3, SP4), 2 (SP4) and 3 (SP4, SP5) in the 60 meters.

== Performance and rules ==
Wheelchairs used by this class have three wheels, with a maximum rear height of 70 centimetres (28 in) and maximum front height of 50 centimetres (20 in). Chairs cannot have mirrors or any gears. They are not allowed to have anything protruding from the back of the chair. Officials can check for this by placing the chair against a wall, where the rear wheels should touch it without obstruction. As opposed to wearing hip numbers, racers in this class wear them on the helmet. Instead of wearing bibs, these numbers are put on the back of the racing chair and the racer.

The verbal starting commands for this class are different because it is a wheelchair class. For "On your marks" should be used to indicate that the athlete should approach or be at the starting line. "Set" means the athlete should take their final starting position. At this time, the front wheel should be touching the ground behind the starting line. At this stage, no further movement is allowed until the starting gun is fired. Movement is then allowed at "Go" or when the starting pistol is fired. Because this is a wheelchair class, different rules apply for overtaking with the responsibility lying with the racer coming from behind. They must be completely clear of the front wheel of the racer they are overtaking before cutting in front of them. The racer being overtaken cannot deliberately obstruct or impede the racer doing the overtaking. If a crash occurs within the first 50 meters of a race that is 800 meters or longer, the starting official has the option of recalling the race. In races in the United States, a race official's job for a crash is only to direct other racers around the accident 30 meters ahead of the accident.

In relay events involve this class, each team has two lanes. Racers don't use a baton, but instead transfer via touch of the body in the exchange zone. The incoming racer cannot use their momentum to push and give the ongoing racer any acceleration. The acceleration zone is 20 meters, with the take over zone being 20 meters.

In wheelchair races, the winner and time is determined by when the center of the front axle goes across the finish line.

Athletes in this class used secure frames for throwing events. The frame can be only one of two shapes: A rectangle or square. The sides must be at least 30 centimetres (12 in) long. The seat needs to be lower at the back or level, and it cannot be taller than 75 centimetres (30 in). This height includes any cushioning or padding. Throwers can have footplates on their frames, but the footplate can only be used for stability. It cannot be used to push off from. Rests can be used on the frame but they need to be present only for safety reasons and to aide in athlete stability. They need to be manufactured from rigid materials that do not move. These materials may include steel or aluminum. The backrest can have cushioning but it cannot be thicker than 5 centimetres (2.0 in). It cannot have any movable parts. The frame can also have a holding bar. The holding bar needs to be round or square, and needs to be a single straight piece. Athletes are not required to use a holding bar during their throw, and they can hold on to any part of the frame during their throw. Throwing frames should be inspected prior to the event. This should be done either in the call room or in the competition area. In general, people in this class should be allocated around 3 minutes to set up their chair.

Athletes need to throw from a seated position. They cannot throw from an inclined or other position. Doing so could increase the contribution of their legs and benefit their performance. Their legs must be in contact with the seat during the throw. If an athlete throws from a non-seated position, this is counted as a foul. People in this class can put tape on their non-throwing hand to assist in gripping the holding bar. All straps used to hold the athlete to the frame must be non-elastic. While in the process of throwing, an athlete cannot touch a tie-down for the frame. Because of visibility issues for officials, athletes cannot wear lose clothing and they can ask athletes to tuck in clothing if they feel there is any issue with visibility. In throwing events at the Paralympic Games and World Championships, athletes get three trial throws. After that, the top 8 throwers get an additional three throws. For other events, organizers generally have the option to use that formula to give all throwers six consecutive throws. The total number of warm-up throws is at the discretion of the meet director.

== Events ==
Relay events available to this class internationally include the 4 x 100 meters and the 4 x 400 meters. The 4 x 100 meters and the 4 x 400 meters are also available in national competitions in the United States. Junior relays in the United States include the 4 x 100 meters, the 4 x 400 meters, and the 800 meter medley of 100, 100, 200 and 400 meters.

== History ==
The classification was created by the International Paralympic Committee and has roots in a 2003 attempt to address "the overall objective to support and co-ordinate the ongoing development of accurate, reliable, consistent and credible sport focused classification systems and their implementation."

For the 2016 Summer Paralympics in Rio, the International Paralympic Committee had a zero classification at the Games policy. This policy was put into place in 2014, with the goal of avoiding last minute changes in classes that would negatively impact athlete training preparations. All competitors needed to be internationally classified with their classification status confirmed prior to the Games, with exceptions to this policy being dealt with on a case-by-case basis. In case there was a need for classification or reclassification at the Games despite best efforts otherwise, athletics classification was scheduled for September 4 and September 5 at Olympic Stadium. For sportspeople with physical or intellectual disabilities going through classification or reclassification in Rio, their in competition observation event is their first appearance in competition at the Games.

== Becoming classified ==
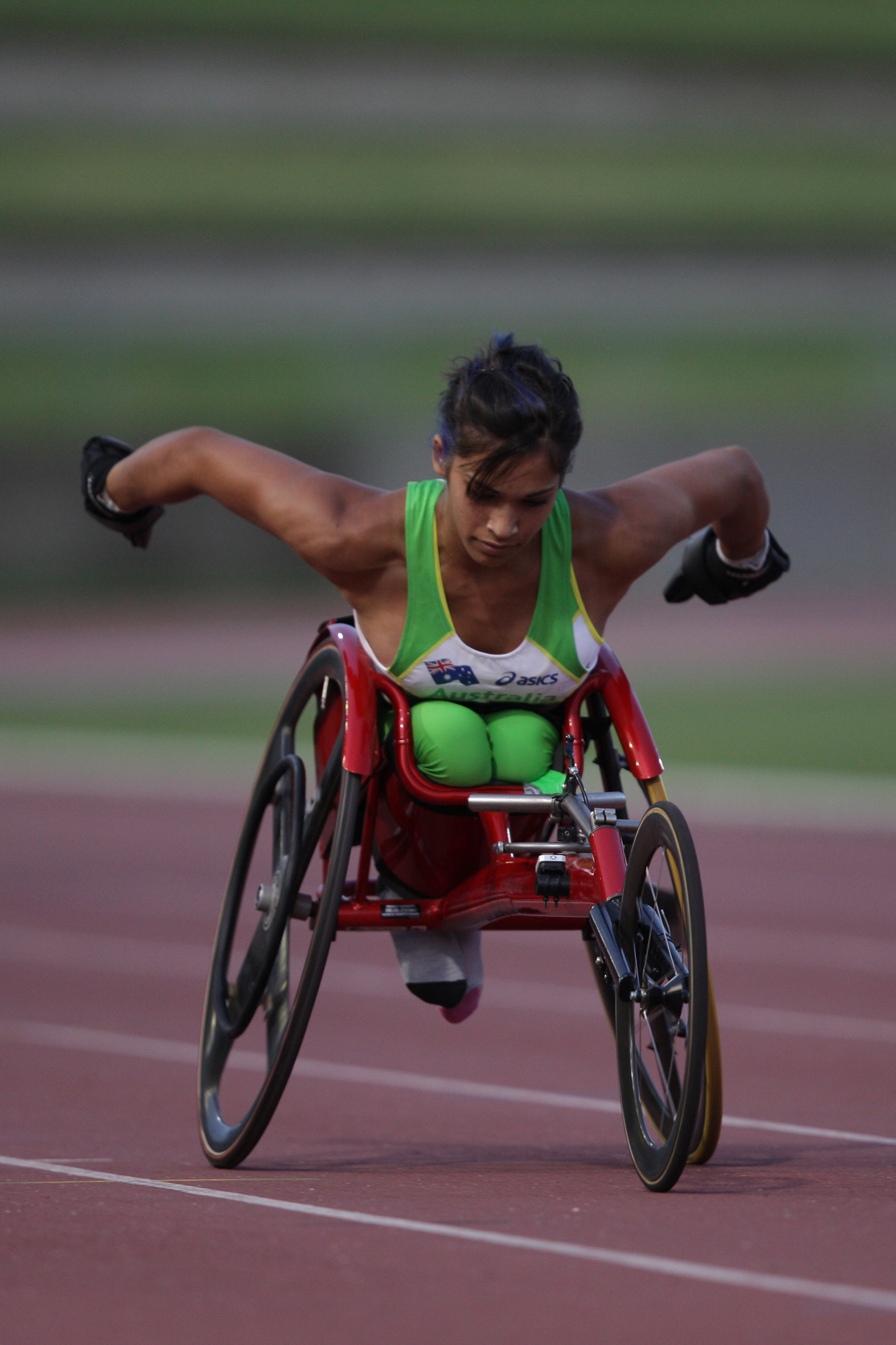
Madison de Rozario is a T53 competitor

Wheelchair athletes who wish to compete in para-athletics competition must first undergo a classification assessment. During this, they both undergo a bench test of muscle strength and demonstrate their skills in athletics, such as pushing a racing wheelchair and throwing. A determination is then made as to what classification an athlete should compete in. Classifications may be Confirmed or Review status. For athletes who do not have access to a full classification panel, Provisional classification is available; this is a temporary Review classification, considered an indication of class only, and generally used only in lower levels of competition.

While some people in this class may be ambulatory, they generally go through the classification process while using a wheelchair. This is because they often compete from a seated position. Failure to do so could result in them being classified as an ambulatory class competitor.

== World records ==
In the 100m event, the men's world record is held by Mickey Bushell and the women's world record is held by Lisha Huang.

== Competitors ==
Notable athletics competitors in this class include Tanni Grey-Thompson (GBR), Angie Ballard (AUS) and Richard Colman (AUS).
