= India at the 2025 World Para Athletics Championships =

- IPC code: IND
- NPC: Paralympic Committee of India
- Website: www.paralympic.org.in

in New Delhi, India September 27, 2025 – October 5, 2025
- Competitors: 73
- Flag bearers: Dharambir Nain; Preethi Pal
- Medals Ranked 6th: Gold 6 Silver 9 Bronze 7 Total 22

Summer appearances
- 2023; 2025

India is participating in the 2025 World Para Athletics Championships, being held in New Delhi, India from 27 September to 5 October 2025. The Indian contingent consists of 73 athletes.

== Medalists ==
Medal	Name	Class	Event	Date
(gold) Gold	Shailesh Kumar	T42	Men's high jump T63	27 September
(gold) Gold	Rinku Hooda	F46	Men's javelin throw	29 September
(gold) Gold	Sandip Sanjay Sargar	F44	Men's javelin throw F44	30 September
(gold) Gold	Sumit Antil	F64	Men's javelin throw F64	30 September
(gold) Gold	Simran Sharma	T12	Women's 100m T12	3 October
(gold) Gold	Nishad Kumar	T47	Men's high jump T47	3 October
(silver) Silver	Deepthi Jeevanji	T20	Women's 400 metres	27 September
(silver) Silver	Sundar Singh Gurjar	F46	Men's javelin throw	29 September
(silver) Silver	Yogesh Kathuniya	F56	Men's discus throw	30 September
(silver) Silver	Sandeep Chaudhary	F44	Men's javelin throw F44	30 September
(silver) Silver	Dharambir Nain	F51	Men's club throw F51	2 October
(silver) Silver	Ekta Bhyan	F51	Women's club throw F51	4 October
(silver) Silver	Preeti Pal	T35	Women's 100m T35	5 October
(bronze) Bronze	Varun Singh Bhati	T42	Men's high jump T63	27 September
(bronze) Bronze	Atul Kaushik	F57	Men's discus throw F57	2 October
(bronze) Bronze	Preeti Pal	T35	Women's 200m T35	3 October
(bronze) Bronze	Pardeep Kumar	F64	Men's Discus Throw F64	3 October
(bronze) Bronze	Praveen Kumar	T44	Men's high jump F64	4 October
(bronze) Bronze	Soman Rana	F57	Men's Shot put F57	4 October

=== Summary ===
Medals by events
Sport	Gold	Silver	Bronze	Total
Field	5	8	5	18
Track	1	2	1	4
Total	6	9	7	22

Medals by day
Day	Date	Gold	Silver	Bronze	Total
1	27 September	1	1	1	3
3	29 September	1	1	0	2
4	30 September	2	2	0	4
6	2 October	0	1	1	2
7	3 October	2	0	2	4
8	4 October	0	2	1	3
9	5 October	0	2	2	4
Total		6	9	7	22

Medals by gender
Gender	Gold	Silver	Bronze	Total
Male	5	6	5	16
Female	1	4	1	6
Total	6	9	7	22

Multiple medalists
Name	Class	1st place, gold medalist(s)	2nd place, silver medalist(s)	3rd place, bronze medalist(s)	Total
Preethi Pal					

== Medal summary ==
=== Gold Medalists ===
Shailesh Kumar, the reigning Asian Games champion, won India's first gold medal in the high jump T63 event, in which his compatriot and triple paralympic medalist Mariyappan Thangavelu had won the gold medal in the previous edition. He clinched his second championship medal after a silver in the 2023 edition.

=== Silver Medalists ===
Deepthi Jeevanji, the 2024 Paralympics bronze medalist, won India's first silver medal (and the first medal in track events) in the women's 400 metres T20 event, which was her second medal after clinching a gold medal at the previous edition.

=== Bronze Medalists ===
Varun Singh Bhati won India's first bronze medal (and the first medal in field events) in the men's high jump T63 event. He won his second championship medal after a bronze in 2017 edition.

== Track events ==
Legend:

- Note – Ranks given for track events are only within the athlete's heat.
- Q = Qualified for the next round
- q = Qualified for the next round as the fastest loser or, in field events, by position without achieving the qualifying target.
- DQ = Disqualified
- PR = Paralympic Record
- AR = Area (or Continental) Record
- NR = National Record
- PB = Personal Best
- SB = Season's Best

=== Men ===
Athlete	Event	Heats		Semi-final		Final	
Athlete	Event	Result	Rank	Result	Rank	Result	Rank
Rakeshbhai Bhatt	100m T37	11.62 PB	3q	—N/a		11.88	7
Shreyansh Trivedi	100m T37	11.94 PB	2q	—N/a		12.18	8
Sandeep	200m T44	23.99 PB	4q	—N/a		23.60 PB	3rd place, bronze medalist(s)
Akira Nandan Banothu	400m T38	50.55 PB	3Q	—N/a		51.16	7
Dilip Mahadu Gavit	400m T47	48.20; AS PB	2Q	—N/a		48.61	4

=== Women ===
Athlete	Event	Heats		Semi-final		Final	
Athlete	Event	Result	Rank	Result	Rank	Result	Rank
Simran Sharma	100m T12	12.13 ~~PB~~	1Q	12.08 ~~PB~~	1Q	11.95 PB	1st place, gold medalist(s)
Preeti Pal	100m T35	14.50 SB	1Q	—N/a		14.33 SB	2nd place, silver medalist(s)
Simran Sharma	200m T12	25.03 ~~SB~~	1Q	24.92 ~~SB~~	1Q	24.46 PB AR	2nd place, silver medalist(s)
Preeti Pal	200m T35	—N/a				30.03 SB	3rd place, bronze medalist(s)
Deepthi Jeevanji	400m T20	58.35 ~~SB~~	1Q	—N/a		55.16 SB	2nd place, silver medalist(s)
Anjanaben Bumbadiya	400m T47	1:00.04 PB	4	Did not advance to next round			

== Field events ==
Legend:

- Note – Ranks given for track events are only within the athlete's heat.
- Q = Qualified for the next round
- q = Qualified for the next round as the fastest loser or, in field events, by position without achieving the qualifying target.
- DSQ = Disqualified
- WR = World Record
- CR = Championship Record
- PB = Personal Best
- SB = Season Best
- NM = No Mark

=== Men ===
Athlete	Event	Qualification		Final	
Athlete	Event	Result	Rank	Result	Rank
Dharambir Nain	Club Throw F51	—N/a		29.71	2nd place, silver medalist(s)
Pranav Soorma	Club Throw F51	—N/a		28.19 SB	5
Monu Ghanghas	Discus Throw F11	—N/a		32.65	9
Haney	Discus Throw F37	—N/a		51.22	4
Devender Kumar	Discus Throw F44	—N/a		50.12	6
Pardeep	Discus Throw F44	—N/a		46.14	8
Sagar Thayat	Discus Throw F44	—N/a		51.93 PB	4
Yogesh Kathuniya	Discus Throw F56	—N/a		42.49	2nd place, silver medalist(s)
Atul Kaushik	Discus Throw F57	—N/a		45.61	3rd place, bronze medalist(s)
Birbhadra Singh	Discus Throw F57	38.79	5	Did not advance	
Priyans Kumar	Discus Throw F57	39.12	4q	42.52 PB	8
Pardeep Kumar	Discus Throw F64	—N/a		46.23 SB	3rd place, bronze medalist(s)
Sharvan Kumar	Discus Throw F64	—N/a		44.11 SB	5
Nishad Kumar	High Jump T47	—N/a		2.14; AS PB	1st place, gold medalist(s)
Rampal Chahar	High Jump T47	—N/a		1.94 SB	5
Rahul Saroha	High Jump T63	—N/a		1.78 PB	4
Shailesh Kumar	High Jump T63	—N/a		1.91; CR PB	1st place, gold medalist(s)
Varun Singh Bhati	High Jump T63	—N/a		1.85	3rd place, bronze medalist(s)
Banti	High Jump T64	—N/a		1.87 PB	6
Praveen Kumar	High Jump T64	—N/a		2.00 SB	3rd place, bronze medalist(s)
Manjeet Vyas	Javelin Throw F13	—N/a		57.80 PB	5
Navdeep Singh	Javelin Throw F41	—N/a		45.46 SB	2nd place, silver medalist(s)
Mahendra Gurjar	Javelin Throw F44	—N/a		57.84	7
Pushpendra Singh	Javelin Throw F44	—N/a		61.94 SB	4
Sandeep Chaudhary	Javelin Throw F44	—N/a		62.67 SB	2nd place, silver medalist(s)
Sandip Sanjay Sargar	Javelin Throw F44	—N/a		62.82 =PB	1st place, gold medalist(s)
Ajeet Singh Yadav	Javelin Throw F46	—N/a		61.77 SB	4
Rinku Hooda	Javelin Throw F46	—N/a		66.37; CR SB	1st place, gold medalist(s)
Sundar Singh Gurjar	Javelin Throw F46	—N/a		64.76 SB	2nd place, silver medalist(s)
Pradeep Kumar	Javelin Throw F54	—N/a		26.11 PB	7
Hem Chandra	Javelin Throw F57	—N/a		41.17 PB	10
Parveen Kumar	Javelin Throw F57	—N/a		41.92 SB	8
Pardeep Kumar	Javelin Throw F64	—N/a		42.72	5
Sumit Antil	Javelin Throw F64	—N/a		71.37 CR	1st place, gold medalist(s)
Vishu	Long Jump T12	—N/a		6.24 PB	6
Mit Bharatbhai Patel	Long Jump T44	—N/a		6.28 PB	5
Pardeep	Long Jump T44	—N/a		5.30	8
Unni Renu	Long Jump T44	—N/a		5.96 PB	6
Ajay Singh	Long Jump T47	—N/a		6.31 SB	10
Vikas	Long Jump T47	—N/a		6.96	6
Mahendra Gurjar	Long Jump T63	—N/a		NM	
Solairaj Dharmaraj	Long Jump T64	—N/a		7.08 AS	7
Monu Ghangas	Shot Put F11	—N/a		10.87	10
Sagar	Shot Put F11	—N/a		11.74	7
Manu	Shot Put F37	—N/a		13.43	9
Ravi Rongali	Shot Put F40	—N/a		10.10 SB	6
Ayush Verma	Shot Put F53	—N/a		7.23 PB	5
Mohd Yasser	Shot Put F46	—N/a		14.73	6
Parveen	Shot Put F46	—N/a		14.24	8
Sachin Sarjerao Khilari	Shot Put F46	—N/a		15.03	4
Hokato Hotozhe Sema	Shot Put F57	—N/a		14.35 SB	6
Shubham Juyal	Shot Put F57	13.34 ~~PB~~	1q	13.72 PB	7
Soman Rana	Shot Put F57	—N/a		14.69 SB	2nd place, silver medalist(s)

=== Women ===
Athlete	Event	Qualification		Final	
Athlete	Event	Result	Rank	Result	Rank
Anandhi Kulanthaisamy	Club Throw F32	13.03	8	Did not advance	
Ekta Bhyan	Club Throw F51	—N/a		19.80 SB	2nd place, silver medalist(s)
Kashish Lakra	Club Throw F51	—N/a		11.64 SB	6
Kanchan Lakhani	Discus Throw F53	—N/a		9.68 PB	5
Dayawanti	Discus Throw F64	—N/a		27.94 SB	4
Bhavanaben Chaudhary	Javelin Throw F46	—N/a		35.34	8
Suchitra Parida	Javelin Throw F56	—N/a		18.29 PB	6
Nimisha Chakkungalparambil	Long Jump T47	—N/a		5.74; AR PB	4
Bhagyashri Jadhav	Shot Put F34	—N/a		7.67 SB	6
Amisha Rawat	Shot Put F46	—N/a		10.11 PB	9
Keerthika Jayachandran	Shot Put F54	—N/a		6.25 PB	6
Sharmila Dhankhar	Shot Put F57	—N/a		10.03 PB	5
Dayawanti	Shot Put F64	—N/a		7.90 PB	6
