= List of Arjuna Award recipients (2020–2029) =

List of recipients of a sports honor in India

Arjuna Award
- Civilian award for outstanding individual achievements in National Sports
- Sponsored by: Govt. of India
- Established: 1961
- First award: 1961

Highlights
- Total awarded: 162

The Arjuna Award, officially known as the Arjuna Awards for Outstanding Performance in Sports and Games, is the sports honour of Republic of India. It is awarded annually by the Ministry of Youth Affairs and Sports. Before the introduction of the Rajiv Gandhi Khel Ratna in 1991–1992, the Arjuna award was the highest sporting honour of India. As of 2020, the award comprises "a bronze statuette of Arjuna, certificate, ceremonial dress, and a cash prize of ₹15 lakh (US$16,000)." (Note: The cash prize was introduced in the year 1977–1978 as a scholarship of ₹200 (US$2.10) a month for 2 years. It was revised to one time cash prize of ₹5,000 (US$53) in 1986, to ₹20,000 (US$210) in 1987, to ₹50,000 (US$530) in 1993, to ₹1.5 lakh (US$1,600) in 1998, to ₹3 lakh (US$3,200) in 2001, to ₹5 lakh (US$5,300) in 2009, and to ₹15 lakh (US$16,000) in 2020.)

== Name ==
The award is named after Arjuna, a character from the Sanskrit epic Mahabharata of ancient India. He is one of the Pandavas, depicted as a skilled archer winning the hand of Draupadi in marriage and in the Kurukshetra War, Krishna becomes his charioteer teaching him the sacred knowledge of Gita. In Hindu mythology, he has been seen as a symbol of hard work, dedication and concentration.

== History ==
Instituted in 1961 to honour the outstanding sportspersons of the country, the award over the years has undergone a number of expansions, reviews, and rationalizations. The award was expanded to include all the recognised disciplines in 1977, has introduced indigenous games and physically handicapped categories in 1995 and introduced a lifetime contribution category in 1995 leading to creation of a separate Dhyan Chand Award in 2002. The latest revision in 2018 stipulates that the award is given only to the disciplines included in the events like Olympic Games, Paralympic Games, Asian Games, Commonwealth Games, World Championship and World Cup along with Cricket, Indigenous Games, and Parasports. It also recommends giving only fifteen awards in a year, relaxing in case of excellent performance in major multi-sport events, team sports, across gender and giving away of at least one award to physically challenged category.

The nominations for the award are received from all government recognised National Sports Federations, the Indian Olympic Association, the Sports Authority of India (SAI), the Sports Promotion and Control Boards, the state and the union territory governments and the Rajiv Gandhi Khel Ratna, Arjuna, Dhyan Chand and Dronacharya awardees of the previous years. The recipients are selected by a committee constituted by the Ministry and are honoured for their "good performance in the field of sports over a period of four years" at international level and for having shown "qualities of leadership, sportsmanship and a sense of discipline".

== Recipients ==
In 2020, a total of twenty-seven individuals were conferred with the award. Individuals from nineteen different sports were awarded, which includes three from shooting, two each from athletics, badminton, boxing, cricket, hockey and wrestling, and one each from archery, basketball, equestrian, football, golf, kabaddi, kho kho, lawn tennis, rowing, swimming, table tennis and winter sports. Three individuals were also awarded from parasports.

In 2022, a total of twenty-five individuals have been conferred with the award. Individuals from fourteen different sports were awarded, which includes three from athletics, two each from badminton, boxing, chess, shooting and wrestling, and one each from hockey, judo, kabaddi, lawn bowls, mallakhamb, table tennis, weightlifting and wushu. Four individuals were also awarded from parasports.

== List of recipients ==
Award recipients by year
Year	Number of recipients
2020	27
2021	35
2022	25
2023	26
2024	32
2025	17

Award recipients by sport
Sport	Number of recipients
Archery	6
Athletics	27
Badminton	14
Basketball	1
Boxing	9
Canoeing	1
Chess	6
Cricket	5
Equestrian	3
Fencing	1
Football	1
Golf	2
Hockey	30
Judo	2
Kabaddi	7
Kho Kho	2
Lawn Bowls	2
Mallakhamba	2
Rowing	2
Shooting	16
Squash	2
Swimming	3
Table Tennis	4
Tennis	2
Weightlifting	1
Winter Sports	1
Wrestling	8
Wushu	2

Key
§	Indicates Para sports

List of Arjuna award recipients, showing the year, sport, and gender
Year	Recipient	Sport	Gender
2020	Atanu Das	Archery	Male
2020	Dutee Chand	Athletics	Female
2020	Satwiksairaj Rankireddy	Badminton	Male
2020	Chirag Shetty	Badminton	Male
2020	Vishesh Bhriguvanshi	Basketball	Male
2020	Manish Kaushik	Boxing	Male
2020	Lovlina Borgohain	Boxing	Female
2020	Ishant Sharma	Cricket	Male
2020	Deepti Sharma	Cricket	Female
2020	Sawant Ajay Anant	Equestrian	Male
2020	Sandesh Jhingan	Football	Male
2020	Aditi Ashok	Golf	Female
2020	Akashdeep Singh	Hockey	Male
2020	Deepika Thakur	Hockey	Female
2020	Deepak Niwas Hooda	Kabaddi	Male
2020	Sarika Kale	Kho Kho	Female
2020	Dattu Baban Bhokanal	Rowing	Male
2020	Manu Bhaker	Shooting	Female
2020	Saurabh Chaudhary	Shooting	Male
2020	Madhurika Patkar	Table Tennis	Female
2020	Divij Sharan	Tennis	Male
2020	Shiva Keshavan	Winter Sports	Male
2020	Divya Kakran	Wrestling	Female
2020	Rahul Aware	Wrestling	Male
2020	Suyash Jadhav	Swimming§	Male
2020	Sandeep Chaudhary	Athletics§	Male
2020	Manish Narwal	Shooting§	Male
2021	Arpinder Singh	Athletics	Male
2021	Simranjit Kaur	Boxing	Female
2021	Shikhar Dhawan	Cricket	Male
2021	C. A. Bhavani Devi	Fencing	Female
2021	Monika Malik	Hockey	Female
2021	Vandana Katariya	Hockey	Female
2021	Sandeep Narwal	Kabaddi	Male
2021	Himani Uttam Parab	Mallakhamba	Female
2021	Abhishek Verma	Shooting	Male
2021	Ankita Raina	Tennis	Female
2021	Deepak Punia	Wrestling	Male
2021	Dilpreet Singh	Hockey	Male
2021	Harmanpreet Singh	Hockey	Male
2021	Rupinder Pal Singh	Hockey	Male
2021	Surender Kumar	Hockey	Male
2021	Amit Rohidas	Hockey	Male
2021	Birendra Lakra	Hockey	Male
2021	Sumit Walmiki	Hockey	Male
2021	Nilakanta Sharma	Hockey	Male
2021	Hardik Singh	Hockey	Male
2021	Vivek Prasad	Hockey	Male
2021	Gurjant Singh	Hockey	Male
2021	Mandeep Singh	Hockey	Male
2021	Shamsher Singh	Hockey	Male
2021	Lalit Kumar Upadhyay	Hockey	Male
2021	Varun Kumar	Hockey	Male
2021	Simranjeet Singh	Hockey	Male
2021	Yogesh Kathuniya	Athletics§	Male
2021	Nishad Kumar	Athletics§	Male
2021	Praveen Kumar	Athletics§	Male
2021	Suhas Lalinakere Yathiraj	Badminton§	Male
2021	Singhraj Adhana	Shooting§	Male
2021	Bhavina Patel	Table Tennis§	Female
2021	Harvinder Singh	Archery§	Male
2021	Sharad Kumar	Athletics§	Male
2022	Seema Punia	Athletics	Female
2022	Eldhose Paul	Athletics	Male
2022	Avinash Sable	Athletics	Male
2022	Lakshya Sen	Badminton	Male
2022	Prannoy H. S.	Badminton	Male
2022	Amit Panghal	Boxing	Male
2022	Nikhat Zareen	Boxing	Female
2022	Bhakti Kulkarni	Chess	Female
2022	R Praggnanandhaa	Chess	Male
2022	Deep Grace Ekka	Hockey	Female
2022	Shushila Devi Likmabam	Judo	Female
2022	Sakshi Kumari	Kabaddi	Female
2022	Nayanmoni Saikia	Lawn Bowls	Female
2022	Sagar Kailas Ovhalkar	Mallakhamba	Male
2022	Elavenil Valarivan	Shooting	Female
2022	Om Prakash Mitharwal	Shooting	Male
2022	Sreeja Akula	Table Tennis	Female
2022	Vikas Thakur	Weightlifting	Male
2022	Anshu Malik	Wrestling	Female
2022	Sarita Mor	Wrestling	Female
2022	Praveen Kumar	Wushu	Male
2022	Manasi Girishchandra Joshi	Badminton§	Female
2022	Tarun Dhillon	Badminton§	Male
2022	Swapnil Sanjay Patil	Swimming§	Male
2022	Jerlin Anika	Badminton§	Female
2023	Ojas Deotale	Archery	Male
2023	Aditi Swami	Archery	Female
2023	Murali Sreeshankar	Athletics	Male
2023	Parul Chaudhary	Athletics	Female
2023	Mohammad Hussamuddin	Boxing	Male
2023	R Vaishali	Chess	Female
2023	Mohammed Shami	Cricket	Male
2023	Anush Agarwalla	Equestrian	Male
2023	Divyakriti Singh	Equestrian	Female
2023	Diksha Dagar	Golf	Female
2023	Krishan Pathak	Hockey	Male
2023	Sushila Chanu	Hockey	Female
2023	Pawan Sehrawat	Kabaddi	Male
2023	Ritu Negi	Kabaddi	Female
2023	Nasreen Shaikh	Kho Kho	Female
2023	Pinki Singh	Lawn Bowls	Female
2023	Aishwary Pratap Singh Tomar	Shooting	Male
2023	Esha Singh	Shooting	Female
2023	Harinder Pal Sandhu	Squash	Male
2023	Ayhika Mukherjee	Table Tennis	Female
2023	Sunil Kumar	Wrestling	Male
2023	Antim Panghal	Wrestling	Female
2023	Naorem Roshibina Devi	Wushu	Female
2023	Sheetal Devi	Archery§	Female
2023	Ajay Kumar Reddy	Cricket§	Male
2023	Prachi Yadav	Canoeing§	Female
2024	Jyothi Yarraji	Athletics	Female
2024	Annu Rani	Athletics	Female
2024	Nitu Ghanghas	Boxing	Female
2024	Saweety Boora	Boxing	Female
2024	Vantika Agrawal	Chess	Female
2024	Salima Tete	Hockey	Female
2024	Abhishek Nain	Hockey	Male
2024	Sanjay Rana	Hockey	Male
2024	Jarmanpreet Singh	Hockey	Male
2024	Sukhjeet Singh	Hockey	Male
2024	Rakesh Kumar	Archery§	Male
2024	Preethi Pal	Athletics§	Female
2024	Deepthi Jeevanji	Athletics§	Female
2024	Ajeet Singh Yadav	Athletics§	Male
2024	Sachin Khilari	Athletics§	Male
2024	Dharambir Nain	Athletics§	Male
2024	Pranav Soorma	Athletics§	Male
2024	Hokato Hotozhe Sema	Athletics§	Male
2024	Simran Sharma	Athletics§	Female
2024	Navdeep Singh	Athletics§	Male
2024	Kumar Nitesh	Badminton§	Male
2024	Thulasimathi Murugesan	Badminton§	Female
2024	Nithya Sre Sivan	Badminton§	Female
2024	Manisha Ramadass	Badminton§	Female
2024	Kapil Parmar	Judo§	Male
2024	Mona Agarwal	Shooting§	Female
2024	Rubina Francis	Shooting§	Female
2024	Swapnil Kusale	Shooting	Male
2024	Sarabjot Singh	Shooting	Male
2024	Abhay Singh	Squash	Male
2024	Sajan Prakash	Swimming	Male
2024	Aman Sehrawat	Wrestling	Male
2025	Tejaswin Shankar	Athletics	Male
2025	Muhammad Ajmal Variyathodi	Athletics	Male
2025	Priyanka Goswami	Athletics	Female
2025	Treesa Jolly	Badminton	Female
2025	Gayatri Gopichand	Badminton	Female
2025	Narender Berwal	Boxing	Male
2025	Vidit Gujrathi	Chess	Male
2025	Divya Deshmukh	Chess	Female
2025	Dhanush Srikanth	Deaf shooting	Male
2025	Lalremsiami Hmarzote	Hockey	Female
2025	Raj Kumar Pal	Hockey	Male
2025	Surjeet Singh Narwal	Kabaddi	Male
2025	Pooja Hathwala	Kabaddi	Female
2025	Rudransh Khandelwal	Shooting§	Male
2025	Ekta Bhyan	Athletics§	Female
2025	Arvind Singh	Rowing	Male
2025	Akhil Sheoran	Shooting	Male
