= List of National Sports Award recipients in parasports =

National Sports Awards in Parasports
- Various civilian awards for contributions to Sports (Individual/Team)
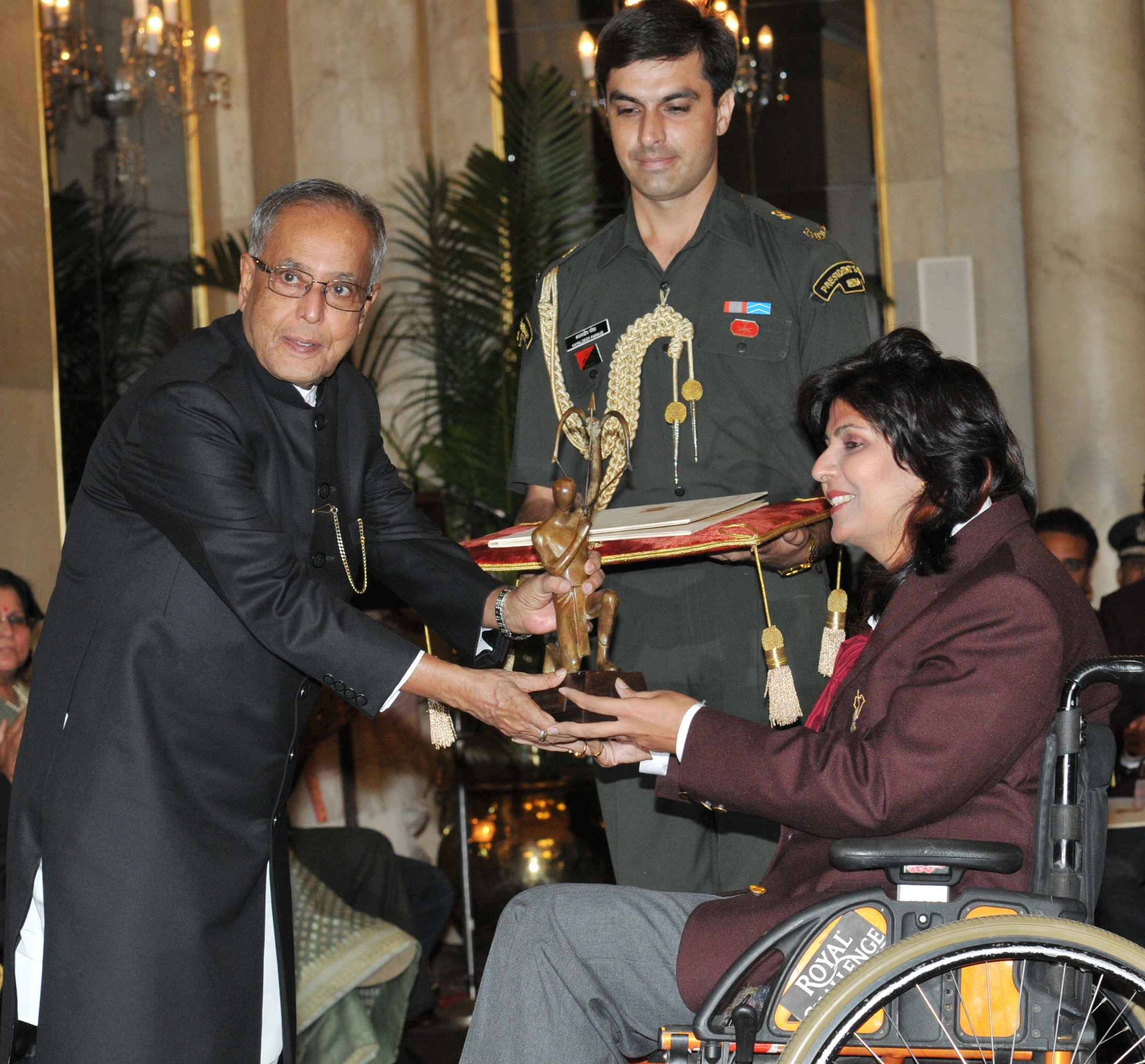
- Awarded for: Various sports honour of India
- Sponsored by: Government of India
- Location: Rashtrapati Bhavan
- Country: Republic of India
- Presented by: President of India
- First award: 1974
- Final award: 2024

Highlights
- Total awarded: 99
- Awards: Arjuna Award; Dronacharya Award; Major Dhyan Chand Khel Ratna; Dhyan Chand Award

The National Sports Awards is the collective name given to the six sports awards of Republic of India. It is awarded annually by the Ministry of Youth Affairs and Sports. They are presented by the President of India in the same ceremony at the Rashtrapati Bhavan usually on 29 August each year along with the national adventure award. As of 2024, a total of ninety-nine individuals have been awarded the various National Sports Awards in parasports. The four awards presented in parasports are Major Dhyan Chand Khel Ratna, Arjuna Award, Dhyan Chand Award and Dronacharya Award.

First presented in the year 1974, a total of seventy-five individuals have been honoured with the Arjuna Award in parasports for their "good performance at the international level" over the period of last four years, with two individuals being awarded for their lifetime contribution. First presented in the year 2012, a total of seven coaches have been honoured with the Dronacharya Award in parasports for their "outstanding work on a consistent basis and enabling sportspersons to excel in international events" over the period of last four years, with one coach being awarded in the lifetime contribution category. First presented in the year 2017, a total of nine sportspersons have been honoured with the Khel Ratna, the highest sporting honour of India, in parasports for their "most outstanding performance at the international level" over the period of last four years. First presented in the year 2004, a total of seven retired sportspersons have been honoured with the Dhyan Chand Award, the lifetime achievement sporting honour of India, in parasports for their "good performance at the international level and their continued contributions to the promotion of sports even after their career as a sportsperson is over."

== Recipients ==
Key
+ Indicates a Lifetime contribution honour

List of National Sports award recipients, showing the year, award, discipline(s) and gender
Year	Recipient	Award	Discipline(s)	Gender
2017	Devendra Jhajharia	Rajiv Gandhi Khel Ratna	Athletics	Male
2019	Deepa Malik	Rajiv Gandhi Khel Ratna	Athletics	Female
2020	Mariyappan Thangavelu	Rajiv Gandhi Khel Ratna	Athletics	Male
2021	Avani Lekhara	Major Dhyan Chand Khel Ratna	Shooting	Female
2021	Sumit Antil	Major Dhyan Chand Khel Ratna	Athletics	Male
2021	Pramod Bhagat	Major Dhyan Chand Khel Ratna	Badminton	Male
2021	Krishna Nagar	Major Dhyan Chand Khel Ratna	Badminton	Male
2021	Manish Narwal	Major Dhyan Chand Khel Ratna	Shooting	Male
2024	Praveen Kumar	Major Dhyan Chand Khel Ratna	Athletics	Male
1974	Anjan Bhattacharjee	Arjuna Award	Cricket	Male
1977–1978	Satish Kumar	Arjuna Award	Athletics	Male
1978–1979	Shernaz Kermani	Arjuna Award	Parasports (Note: Wheelchair Javelin throw, Swimming & Table Tennis)	Female
1985	T. N. Shenoy	Arjuna Award	Swimming	Male
1991	Rajeev Bagga	Arjuna Award	Badminton	Male
1995	Malathi Krishnamurthy Holla	Arjuna Award	Athletics	Female
1996	Sandeep Singh Dhillon	Arjuna Award	Badminton	Male
1996	Kalle Gowda	Arjuna Award	Athletics & Cricket	Male
1997	M. Mahadev	Arjuna Award	Athletics & Cricket	Male
1997	Naresh Kumar Sharma	Arjuna Award	Shooting	Male
1998	Anju Dua	Arjuna Award	Gymnastics	Female
1998	Ranjini Ramanujam	Arjuna Award	Badminton	Female
1999	G. Venkataravanappa ^{+}	Arjuna Award	Athletics	Male
2000	Joginder Singh Bedi ^{+}	Arjuna Award	Athletics	Male
2000	Vijay Bhalanchandra Munishwar	Arjuna Award	Athletics & Powerlifting	Male
2000	Yadvendra Vashishta	Arjuna Award	Athletics	Male
2001	K. R. Shankar Iyer	Arjuna Award	Athletics	Male
2002	Ramesh Tikaram	Arjuna Award	Athletics & Badminton	Male
2003	Madasu Srinivas Rao	Arjuna Award	Badminton	Male
2004	Devendra Jhajharia	Arjuna Award	Athletics	Male
2005	Rajinder Singh Rahelu	Arjuna Award	Powerlifting	Male
2006	Rohit Bhaker	Arjuna Award	Badminton	Male
2007	Farman Basha	Arjuna Award	Powerlifting	Male
2009	Parul Parmar	Arjuna Award	Badminton	Female
2010	Jagseer Singh	Arjuna Award	Athletics	Male
2011	Prasanta Karmakar	Arjuna Award	Swimming	Male
2012	Deepa Malik	Arjuna Award	Athletics	Female
2012	Ramkaran Singh	Arjuna Award	Athletics	Male
2013	Amit Kumar Saroha	Arjuna Award	Athletics	Male
2014	H. N. Girisha	Arjuna Award	Athletics	Male
2015	Sharath Gayakwad	Arjuna Award	Swimming	Male
2016	Raj Kumar	Arjuna Award	Badminton	Male
2016	Sandeep Singh Maan	Arjuna Award	Athletics	Male
2016	Virender Singh	Arjuna Award	Wrestling	Male
2017	Varun Singh Bhati	Arjuna Award	Athletics	Male
2017	Mariyappan Thangavelu	Arjuna Award	Athletics	Male
2018	Ankur Dhama	Arjuna Award	Athletics	Male
2018	Manoj Sarkar	Arjuna Award	Badminton	Male
2019	Pramod Bhagat	Arjuna Award	Badminton	Male
2019	Sundar Singh Gurjar	Arjuna Award	Athletics	Male
2020	Sandeep Chaudhary	Arjuna Award	Athletics	Male
2020	Suyash Narayan Jadhav	Arjuna Award	Swimming	Male
2020	Manish Narwal	Arjuna Award	Shooting	Male
2021	Yogesh Kathuniya	Arjuna Award	Athletics	Male
2021	Nishad Kumar	Arjuna Award	Athletics	Male
2021	Praveen Kumar	Arjuna Award	Athletics	Male
2021	Suhas Yathiraj	Arjuna Award	Badminton	Male
2021	Singhraj Adhana	Arjuna Award	Shooting	Male
2021	Bhavina Patel	Arjuna Award	Table Tennis	Male
2021	Harvinder Singh	Arjuna Award	Archery	Male
2021	Sharad Kumar	Arjuna Award	Athletics	Male
2022	Manasi Girishchandra Joshi	Arjuna Award	Badminton	Female
2022	Tarun Dhillon	Arjuna Award	Badminton	Male
2022	Swapnil Sanjay Patil	Arjuna Award	Swimming	Male
2022	Jerlin Anika	Arjuna Award	Badminton	Female
2023	Sheetal Devi	Arjuna Award	Archery	Female
2023	Ajay Kumar Reddy	Arjuna Award	Cricket	Male
2023	Prachi Yadav	Arjuna Award	Canoeing	Female
2024	Rakesh Kumar	Arjuna Award	Athletics	Male
2024	Preethi Pal	Arjuna Award	Athletics	Female
2024	Deepthi Jeevanji	Arjuna Award	Athletics	Female
2024	Ajeet Singh Yadav	Arjuna Award	Athletics	Male
2024	Sachin Khilari	Arjuna Award	Athletics	Male
2024	Dharambir Nain	Arjuna Award	Athletics	Male
2024	Pranav Soorma	Arjuna Award	Athletics	Male
2024	Hokato Hotozhe Sema	Arjuna Award	Athletics	Male
2024	Simran Sharma	Arjuna Award	Athletics	Female
2024	Navdeep Singh	Arjuna Award	Athletics	Male
2024	Kumar Nitesh	Arjuna Award	Badminton	Male
2024	Thulasimathi Murugesan	Arjuna Award	Badminton	Female
2024	Nithya Sre Sivan	Arjuna Award	Badminton	Female
2024	Manisha Ramadass	Arjuna Award	Badminton	Female
2024	Kapil Parmar	Arjuna Award	Judo	Male
2024	Mona Agarwal	Arjuna Award	Shooting	Female
2024	Rubina Francis	Arjuna Award	Shooting	Female
2004	Digamber Mehendale	Dhyan Chand Award	Athletics	Male
2012	Sukhbir Singh Tokas	Dhyan Chand Award	Parasports	Male
2013	Girraj Singh	Dhyan Chand Award	Athletics	Male
2020	J. Ranjith Kumar	Dhyan Chand Award	Athletics	Male
2020	Satyaprakash Tiwari	Dhyan Chand Award	Badminton	Male
2022	Nir Bahadur Gurung	Dhyan Chand Award	Athletics	Male
2024	Murlikant Petkar	Dhyan Chand Award	Swimming	Male
2020	Vijay Bhalchandra Munishwar ^{+}	Dronacharya Award	Powerlifting	Male
2012	Satyapal Singh	Dronacharya Award	Athletics	Male
2015	Naval Singh	Dronacharya Award	Athletics	Male
2020	Gaurav Khanna	Dronacharya Award	Badminton	Male
2021	Jai Prakash Nautiyal	Dronacharya Award	Shooting	Male
2022	Suma Shirur	Dronacharya Award	Shooting	Female
2023	Mahaveer Prasad Saini	Dronacharya Award	Athletics	Male
2024	Subhash Rana	Dronacharya Award	Shooting	Male
