= India at the 2024 Summer Paralympics =

- IPC code: IND
- NPC: Paralympic Committee of India
- Website: Paralympic India

in Paris, France August 28, 2024 – September 8, 2024
- Competitors: 84 in 12 sports
- Flag bearers (opening): Bhagyashree Jadhav; Sumit Antil
- Flag bearers (closing): Preethi Pal; Harvinder Singh
- Medals Ranked 18th: Gold 7 Silver 9 Bronze 13 Total 29

Summer Paralympics appearances (overview)
- 1968; 1972; 1976–1980; 1984; 1988; 1992; 1996; 2000; 2004; 2008; 2012; 2016; 2020; 2024

India competed at the 2024 Summer Paralympics in Paris from 28 August to 8 September 2024. The nation made its official debut at the 1968 Summer Paralympics and has appeared in every edition of the Summer Paralympics since 1984. This was India's 13th appearance at the Summer Paralympics.

India sent a contingent consisting of 84 athletes competing across 12 sports in the Paralympic Games. Bhagyashree Jadhav and Sumit Antil were the flag bearers during the opening ceremony. Later, Preethi Pal and Harvinder Singh served as the flag bearers during the closing ceremony.

India won 29 medals including seven gold, nine silver, and thirteen bronze medals. This marked India's highest ever medal tally in Paralympic Games surpassing the tally of 19 medals won in the 2020 Games.

== Background ==
The Paralympic Committee of India was formed in 1994, five years after the International Paralympic Committee was established in 1989. The nation made its Paralympics debut in 1968 and have appeared in every edition of the Summer Paralympic Games since 1984. This edition of the Games marked the nation's 13th appearance at the Summer Paralympics.

India had won 31 medals across Paralympic Games with the most successful Paralympic campaign being the 2020 Tokyo edition with 19 medals including five gold, eight silver and six bronze medals.

The Indian contingent for the 2024 Games consisted of 84 people across 12 sports. Athletes Bhagyashree Jadhav and Sumit Antil were the flag bearers for the opening ceremony. Preethi Pal and Harvinder Singh served as the flag bearers of the closing ceremony.

== Medal summary ==
India won 29 medals including seven gold, nine silver, and thirteen bronze medals. The Games marked India's highest ever medal tally at the Paralympics. The medal haul included four instances of multiple podium finish in the same event.

=== Gold medalists ===
Avani Lekhara won India's first gold medal in the women's 10 m air rifle event. This was Lekhara's second consecutive gold medal in the event and she became first Indian woman athlete to win multiple medals at the Paralympics. Kumar Nitesh won the country's second gold medal in the Games at the badminton events. He won the men's singles SL3 event, in which compatriot Pramod Bhagat had won the gold medal in the previous Games. Sumit Antil became the first Indian male athlete to win back-to-back gold medals in the same event after his victory in the men's javelin throw F64 event. He also set two Paralympic records in the process. Harvinder Singh won India's first Paralympic gold medal in archery. This was his second medal after the bronze he won at the previous Games. Dharambir Nain won India's fifth gold medal in the men's club throw F51 event. Praveen Kumar won India's third athletics gold medal in the men's high jump T64 event. Navdeep Singh, who had earlier finished second in the men's javelin throw F41 event, was awarded the gold medal after Iran's Sadegh Sayah was disqualified. Navdeep's throw of 47.32 meters also set a new Paralympic record.

=== Silver medalists ===
Manish Narwal won India's first silver medal of the Games in the men's 10 m air pistol event, which was his second medal after his gold medal at the previous Games. Nishad Kumar and Yogesh Kathuniya won silver medals in the men's high jump T47 and the men's discus throw F56 events respectively, in a repeat of their performance from Tokyo 2020. Thulasimathi Murugesan won the only Indian silver medal at the women's badminton event. Suhas Yathiraj won a silver medal for the second consecutive Games in the men's singles SL4 para-badminton event. Ajeet Singh Yadav won the silver medal in the men's javelin throw F46 event. Sharad Kumar won his second Paralympic medal, a silver in the men's high jump T63 event. Sachin Khilari won India's fifth athletics silver medal, finishing second in the men's shot put F46 event.

=== Bronze medalists ===
Mona Agarwal won India's first bronze medal at the Games in the women's 10 m air rifle event in which Lekhara won the gold medal. Preethi Pal won India's first ever track medal in athletics by winning a bronze medal in the women's 100 m T35 event. Pal became the only Indian multi-medalist in the Games after she won her second bronze in the women's 200 m T35 event. Rubina Francis won India's fourth shooting medal with a bronze in the women's 10 m air pistol event. Sheetal Devi became the youngest Indian Paralympic medalist after she won a bronze medal in the compound archery event along with Rakesh Kumar. Manisha Ramadass and Nithya Sivan won bronze medals in women's para-badminton events to take the Indian medal tally in the badminton events to five.

Deepthi Jeevanji became the youngest Indian track medalist at the Paralympic Games after she won the bronze medal in the women's 400 m T20 race. Sundar Singh Gurjar won a bronze medal in the men's javelin throw F46 event, which was his second medal after he finished third in the same event in the previous Games. Mariyappan Thangavelu won a medal for the third successive Paralympic Games with a bronze in the men's high jump event. Kapil Parmar won a bronze medal in Judo, which was India's first Paralympic medal in the sport. Hokato Hotozhe Sema won a bronze medal in the men's shot put F57 event and Simran Sharma won India's final bronze medal in the women's 200 metres T12 event.

== Medalists ==
Medalists
Medal	Name	Sport	Event	Date
(gold) Gold	Avani Lekhara	Shooting	Women's R2 10 m air rifle standing SH1	30 August
(gold) Gold	Kumar Nitesh	Badminton	Men's singles SL3	2 September
(gold) Gold	Sumit Antil	Athletics	Men's javelin throw F64	2 September
(gold) Gold	Harvinder Singh	Archery	Individual recurve open	4 September
(gold) Gold	Dharambir Nain	Athletics	Club throw F51	4 September
(gold) Gold	Praveen Kumar	Athletics	High jump T64	6 September
(gold) Gold	Navdeep Singh	Athletics	Javelin throw F41	7 September
(silver) Silver	Manish Narwal	Shooting	Men's P1 10 m air pistol SH1	30 August
(silver) Silver	Nishad Kumar	Athletics	Men's high jump T47	1 September
(silver) Silver	Yogesh Kathuniya	Athletics	Men's discus throw F56	2 September
(silver) Silver	Thulasimathi Murugesan	Badminton	Women's singles SU5	2 September
(silver) Silver	Suhas Yathiraj	Badminton	Men's singles SL4	2 September
(silver) Silver	Ajeet Singh Yadav	Athletics	Javelin throw F46	3 September
(silver) Silver	Sharad Kumar	Athletics	High jump T63	3 September
(silver) Silver	Sachin Khilari	Athletics	Men's shot put F46	4 September
(silver) Silver	Pranav Soorma	Athletics	Club throw F51	4 September
(bronze) Bronze	Mona Agarwal	Shooting	Women's R2 10 m air rifle standing SH1	30 August
(bronze) Bronze	Preethi Pal	Athletics	Women's 100 m T35	30 August
(bronze) Bronze	Rubina Francis	Shooting	Women's P2 10 metre air pistol SH1	31 August
(bronze) Bronze	Preethi Pal	Athletics	Women's 200 m T35	1 September
(bronze) Bronze	Manisha Ramadass	Badminton	Women's singles SU5	2 September
(bronze) Bronze	Sheetal Devi; Rakesh Kumar	Archery	Mixed team compound	2 September
(bronze) Bronze	Nithya Sivan	Badminton	Women's singles SH6	2 September
(bronze) Bronze	Deepthi Jeevanji	Athletics	Women's 400 m T20	3 September
(bronze) Bronze	Mariyappan Thangavelu	Athletics	Men's high jump T63	3 September
(bronze) Bronze	Sundar Singh Gurjar	Athletics	Men's javelin throw F46	3 September
(bronze) Bronze	Kapil Parmar	Judo	Men's J1 -60 kg	5 September
(bronze) Bronze	Hokato Hotozhe Sema	Athletics	Men's Shot put F57	6 September
(bronze) Bronze	Simran Sharma	Athletics	Women's 200 m T12	7 September

=== Summary ===
Medals by sport
Sport	1st place, gold medalist(s)	2nd place, silver medalist(s)	3rd place, bronze medalist(s)	Total
Athletics	4	6	7	17
Badminton	1	2	2	5
Shooting	1	1	2	4
Archery	1	0	1	2
Judo	0	0	1	1
Total	7	9	13	29

Medals by day
Day	Date	1st place, gold medalist(s)	2nd place, silver medalist(s)	3rd place, bronze medalist(s)	Total
1	29 August	0	0	0	0
2	30 August	1	1	2	4
3	31 August	0	0	1	1
4	1 September	0	1	1	2
5	2 September	2	3	3	8
6	3 September	0	2	3	5
7	4 September	2	2	0	4
8	5 September	0	0	1	1
9	6 September	1	0	1	2
10	7 September	1	0	1	2
11	8 September	0	0	0	0
Total		7	9	13	29

Medals by gender
Gender	1st place, gold medalist(s)	2nd place, silver medalist(s)	3rd place, bronze medalist(s)	Total
Male	6	8	4	18
Female	1	1	8	10
Mixed	0	0	1	1
Total	7	9	13	29

Multiple medalists
Name	Sport	1st place, gold medalist(s)	2nd place, silver medalist(s)	3rd place, bronze medalist(s)	Total
Preethi Pal	Athletics	0	0	2	2

== Competitors ==
The Indian contingent consisted of 84 athletes who took part in 74 medal events across 12 sports.

Sport	Men	Women	Total
Archery	3	3	6
Athletics	28	10	38
Badminton	7	6	13
Cycling	1	1	2
Judo	1	1	2
Paracanoeing	1	2	3
Powerlifting	2	2	4
Rowing	1	1	2
Shooting	7	3	10
Swimming	1	0	1
Table tennis	0	2	2
Taekwondo	0	1	1
Total	52	32	84

== Archery ==
India entered six athletes in compound and recurve events by their result at the 2023 World Para Archery Championships held in Plzeň, Czechia.

Compound

The ranking round was held on 29 August 2024. In the men's ranking round, Rakesh Kumar and Shyam Sundar Swami finished fifth and fifteenth respectively. Sheetal Devi scored 703 points in the women's ranking round to finish second and Sarita Adhana was ranked ninth. In the mixed team rankings, Kumar and Devi scored 1399 points to break the previous world record held by Kumar and Adhana.

In the men's individual round, Shyam Sundar Swamy had an early exit after losing to Thailand's Comsan Singpirom in the round of 32. Rakesh Kumar won his round of 32 match easily, but his next two matches were decided on the basis of shoot-offs, with Kumar emerging victorious both times and securing his place in the semi-finals. In the semi-finals, Kumar faced Ai Xinliang of China, where Kumar suffered his first defeat by 143–145. He lost to China's He Zihao by a narrow margin of just one point in the bronze medal match and finished fourth in the category.

Sheetal Devi got a bye in the round of 32. In the round of 16, she lost to 2020 Games silver medalist Mariana Zúñiga by just one point. Sarita Adhana won her first two matches by easy margins but lost the quarterfinal match against eventual gold medalist Öznur Cüre and finished sixth in the women's individual category.

Athlete	Event	Ranking Round		Round of 32	Round of 16	Quarterfinals	Semifinals	Finals / BM	
Athlete	Event	Score	Seed	Opposition Score	Opposition Score	Opposition Score	Opposition Score	Opposition Score	Rank
Rakesh Kumar	Men's individual	696	5	Drame (SEN); W 136–131	Swagumilang (INA); W 144–144 SO	Tremblay (CAN); W 144–144 SO	Xinliang (CHN); L 143–145	Zihao (CHN); L 146–147	4
Shyam Sundar Swami	Men's individual	688	15	Singpirom (THA); L 138–138 SO	Did not advance				17
Sheetal Devi	Women's individual	703	2	Bye	Zúñiga (CHI); L 137–138	Did not advance			9
Sarita Adhana	Women's individual	682	9	Jannaton (MAS); W 138–124	Sarti (ITA); W 141–135	Cüre (TUR); L 140–145	Did not advance		6
Sheetal Devi; Rakesh Kumar	Mixed team	1399 WR	1	Bye		Ferelly / Swagumilang (INA); W 154–143	Hemmati / Nori (IRI); L 152–152 SO	Bonacina / Sarti (ITA); W 156–155	3rd place, bronze medalist(s)

Recurve

Athlete	Event	Ranking Round		Round of 32	Round of 16	Quarterfinals	Semifinals	Finals	
Athlete	Event	Score	Seed	Opposition Score	Opposition Score	Opposition Score	Opposition Score	Opposition Score	Rank
Harvinder Singh	Men's individual	637	9	Lung-hui (TPE); W 7–3	Setiawan (INA); W 6–2	Ramírez (COL); W 6–2	Arab Ameri (IRI); W 7–3	Ciszek (POL); W 6–0	1st place, gold medalist(s)
Pooja Jatyan	Women's individual	585	7	Bye	Şengül (TUR); W 6–0	Chunyan (CHN); L 4–6	Did not advance		
Harvinder Singh; Pooja Jatyan	Mixed team	1222	5	—N/a	Kenton-Smith / Jennings (AUS); W 5–4	Ciszek / Olszewska (POL); W 6–0	Travisani / Mijno (ITA); L 2–6	Fabčič / Lavrinc (SLO); L 4–5	4

== Athletics ==
Indian athletes achieved quota places based on their results at the 2023 and 2024 World Para Athletics Championships, or through allocation quotas, provided they have met the minimum entry standard (MES) for the respective events. The athletics contingent consisted of 38 members including 10 women.

Track events

Athlete	Event	Heat		Semifinal		Final	
Athlete	Event	Result	Rank	Result	Rank	Result	Rank
Preethi Pal	Women's 100 m T35	—N/a				14.21 PB	3rd place, bronze medalist(s)
Preethi Pal	Women's 200 m T35	—N/a				30.01 PB	3rd place, bronze medalist(s)
Simran Sharma	Women's 100 m T12	12.17	1 Q SB	12.33	2 q	12.31	4
Simran Sharma	Women's 200 m T12	25.41	1 Q	25.03	1 Q	24.75 PB	3rd place, bronze medalist(s)
Deepthi Jeevanji	Women's 400 m T20	55.45	1 Q	—N/a		55.82	3rd place, bronze medalist(s)
Rakshitha Raju	Women's 1500 m T11	5:29.92	4	—N/a		Did not advance	
Dilip Gavit	Men's 400 m T47	49.54	3 Q SB	—N/a		49.99	8

Ranks given for track events are within the athlete's heat only

Men's field events

Athlete	Event	Result	Rank
Dharambir Nain	Club throw F51	34.92 AR	1st place, gold medalist(s)
Pranav Soorma	Club throw F51	34.59	2nd place, silver medalist(s)
Amit Kumar Saroha	Club throw F51	23.96	10
Yogesh Kathuniya	Discus throw F56	42.22 SB	2nd place, silver medalist(s)
Sharad Kumar	High jump T63	1.88	2nd place, silver medalist(s)
Mariyappan Thangavelu	High jump T63	1.85	3rd place, bronze medalist(s)
Shailesh Kumar	High jump T63	1.85	4
Nishad Kumar	High jump T47	2.04 SB	2nd place, silver medalist(s)
Rampal Chahar	High jump T47	1.95 PB	7
Praveen Kumar	High jump T64	2.08; PB AR	1st place, gold medalist(s)
Navdeep Singh	Javelin throw F41	47.32; PR PB	1st place, gold medalist(s)
Ajeet Singh Yadav	Javelin throw F46	65.62	2nd place, silver medalist(s)
Rinku Hooda	Javelin throw F46	61.58	5
Sundar Singh Gurjar	Javelin throw F46	64.96	3rd place, bronze medalist(s)
Dipesh Kumar	Javelin throw F54	26.11	7
Praveen Kumar	Javelin throw F57	42.12	8
Sandip Sargar	Javelin throw F64	58.03	7
Sandeep Chaudhary	Javelin throw F64	62.80	4
Sumit Antil	Javelin throw F64	70.59 PR	1st place, gold medalist(s)
Arvind Malik	Shot put F35	13.01 SB	6
Manu Manu	Shot put F37	13.86	6
Ravi Rongali	Shot put F40	10.63 PB	5
Sachin Khilari	Shot put F46	16.32 AR	2nd place, silver medalist(s)
Mohd Yasser	Shot put F46	14.21	8
Rohit Kumar	Shot put F46	14.10	9
Hokato Hotozhe Sema	Shot put F57	14.65 PB	3rd place, bronze medalist(s)
Soman Rana	Shot put F57	14.07	5

Women's field events

Athlete	Event	Result	Rank
Kanchan Lakhani	Discus throw F53	10.06 PB	7
Sakshi Kasana	Discus throw F55	21.49	8
Karamjyoti Dalal	Discus throw F55	20.22	9
Bhavanaben Chaudhary	Javelin throw F46	39.70 PB	5
Bhagyashree Jadhav	Shot put F34	7.28	5
Amisha Rawat	Shot put F46	9.25 PB	14

Legend

- Q = Qualified for the next round
- q = Qualified for the next round (next fastest)
- PR = Paralympic Record
- AR = Area (or continental) record
- NR = National record
- WR = World record
- SB = Season's best
- PB = Personal best

== Badminton ==
India qualified ten para badminton players through the Badminton World Federation para-badminton Race to Paris Paralympic rankings.

Men

Athlete	Event	Group Stage				Quarterfinal	Semifinal	Final / BM	
Athlete	Event	Opposition Score	Opposition Score	Opposition Score	Rank	Opposition Score	Opposition Score	Opposition Score	Rank
Manoj Sarkar	Singles SL3	Nitesh (IND); L (13–21, 21–18, 18–21)	Bunsun (THA); L (19-21, 8-21)	Yang (CHN); W (21–15, 21–11)	3	—N/a	Did not advance		
Kumar Nitesh	Singles SL3	Sarkar (IND); W (21–13, 18–21, 21–18)	Yang (CHN); W (21–5, 21–11)	Bunsun (THA); W (21–13, 21–14)	1 Q	—N/a	Fujihara (JPN); W (21–16, 21–12)	Bethell (GBR); W (21–14, 18–21, 23–21)	1st place, gold medalist(s)
Suhas Yathiraj	Singles SL4	Ramdani (INA); W (21–7, 21–5)	Shin (KOR); W (26–24, 21–14)	—N/a	1 Q	—N/a	Kadam (IND); W (21–17, 21–12)	Mazur (FRA); L (9–21, 13–21)	2nd place, silver medalist(s)
Sukant Kadam	Singles SL4	Burhanuddin (MAS); W (17–21, 21–15, 22–20)	Teamarrom (THA); W (21–12, 21–12)	—N/a	1 Q	—N/a	Yathiraj (IND); L (17–21, 12–21)	Setiawan (INA); L (17–21, 18–21)	4
Tarun Dhillon	Singles SL4	Oliveira (BRA); W (21–17, 21–19)	Mazur (FRA); L (7–21, 16–21)	—N/a	2	—N/a	Did not advance		
Krishna Nagar	Singles SH6	Krajewski (USA); L (16–21, 18–21)	Meechai (THA); L (20–22, 3–11^{r})	—N/a	3	Did not advance			
Sivarajan Solaimalai	Singles SH6	Subhan (INA); L (15–21, 17–21)	Kai (HKG); L (13–21, 21–18, 15–21)	Coombs (GBR); L (12–21, 10–21)	4	Did not advance			

Women

Athlete	Event	Group Stage				Quarterfinal	Semifinal	Final / BM	
Athlete	Event	Opposition Score	Opposition Score	Opposition Score	Rank	Opposition Score	Opposition Score	Opposition Score	Rank
Manasi Joshi	Singles SL3	Syakuroh (INA); L (21–16, 13–21, 18–21)	Kozyna (UKR); L (21–10, 15–21, 21–23)	—N/a	3	Did not advance			
Mandeep Kaur	Singles SL3	Bolaji (NGR); L (8–21, 14–21)	Vinot (AUS); W (21–23, 21–10, 21–17)	—N/a	2 Q	Bolaji (NGR); L (8–21, 9–21)	Did not advance		
Palak Kohli	Singles SL4	Surreau (FRA); W (21–12, 21–14)	Oktila (INA); L (21–18, 5–21, 13–21)	—N/a	2 Q	Sadiyah (INA); L (19–21, 15–21)	Did not advance		
Thulasimathi Murugesan	Singles SU5	de Marco (ITA); W (21–9, 21–11)	Monteiro (POR); W (21–12, 21–8)	—N/a	1 Q	Bye	Ramadass (IND); W (23–21, 21–17)	Yang (CHN); L (17–21, 10–21)	2nd place, silver medalist(s)
Manisha Ramadass	Singles SU5	Lefort (FRA); W (8–21, 21–6, 21–19)	Yang (CHN); L (15–21, 7–21)	—N/a	2 Q	Toyoda (JPN); W (21–13, 21–16)	Murugesan (IND); L (21–23, 17–21)	Rosengren (DEN); W (21–12, 21–8)	3rd place, bronze medalist(s)
Nithya Sivan	Singles SH6	Simon (USA); W (21–7, 21–8)	Cai (TPE); W (21–12, 21–19)	Lin (CHN); L (20–22, 18–21)	2 Q	Szmigiel (POL); W (21–4, 21–7)	Lin (CHN); L (13–21, 19–21)	Marlina (INA); W (21–14, 21–6)	3rd place, bronze medalist(s)

Mixed

Athlete	Event	Group Stage				Semifinal	Final / BM	
Athlete	Event	Opposition Score	Opposition Score	Opposition Score	Rank	Opposition Score	Opposition Score	Rank
Kumar Nitesh; Thulasimathi Murugesan	Doubles SL3–SU5	Yathiraj / Kohli (IND); W (21–14, 21–17)	Ramdani / Oktila (INA); L (15–21, 8–21)	Mazur / Noël (FRA); L (22–24, 19–21)	3	Did not advance		
Suhas Yathiraj; Palak Kohli	Doubles SL3–SU5	Nitesh / Murugesan (IND); L (14–21, 17–21)	Mazur / Noël (FRA); L (15–21, 9–21)	Ramdani / Oktila (INA); L (11–21, 17–21)	4	Did not advance		
Sivarajan Solaimalai; Nithya Sivan	Doubles SH6	Krajewski / Simon (USA); L (21–23, 11–21)	Meechai / Saeyang (THA); W (21–7, 21–17)	—N/a	1 Q	Krajewski / Simon (USA); L (21–17, 14–21, 13–21)	Subhan / Marlina (INA); L (17–21, 12–21)	4

Legend: W = Win; L = Loss; Q = Qualified for the next phase

== Cycling ==
India qualified two para-cyclists (one in each gender) based on the Union Cycliste Internationale rankings on 31 December 2022.

Road

Athlete	Event	Time	Rank
Arshad Shaik	Men's road time trial C2	25:20.11	11
Arshad Shaik	Men's road race C1-3	-1 LAP	
Jyoti Gaderiya	Women's road time trial C1–3	30:00.16	16
Jyoti Gaderiya	Women's road race C1-3	-1 LAP	

Track

Athlete	Event	Qualification		Final	
Athlete	Event	Time	Rank	Time	Rank
Arshad Shaik	Men's time trial C1-3	1:21.416	17	Did not advance	
Arshad Shaik	Men's pursuit C2	4:20.949	9	Did not advance	
Jyoti Gaderiya	Women's time trial C1-3	49.233	11	Did not advance	
Jyoti Gaderiya	Women's pursuit C1-3	4:53.929	10	Did not advance	

== Judo ==
India qualified for Judo for the first time after Kapil Parmar and Kokila Kaushiklate secured quota places based on the International Blind Sports Federation Judo Rankings.

Athlete	Event	Round of 16	Quarterfinals	Semifinals	Repechage 1	Repechage 2	Final / BM	
Athlete	Event	Opposition result	Opposition result	Opposition result	Opposition result	Opposition result	Opposition result	Rank
Kapil Parmar	Men's J1 -60 kg	Bye	Blanco (VEN); W 10–0	Banitaba (IRI); L 0–10	—N/a		de Oliveira (BRA); W 10–0	3rd place, bronze medalist(s)
Kokila Kaushiklate	Women's J2 -48 kg	—N/a	Nauatbek (KAZ); L 0–10	Did not advance	Ivanytska (UKR); L 0–10	—N/a	Did not advance	

== Paracanoeing ==
India earned three quota places through the 2023 and 2024 ICF Canoe Sprint World Championships conducted by the International Canoe Federation.

Athlete	Event	Heats		Semifinal		Final	
Athlete	Event	Time	Rank	Time	Rank	Time	Rank
Yash Kumar	Men's KL1	1:03.28	6	1:02.03	5	Did not advance	
Pooja Ojha	Women's KL1	1:16.09	5	1:17.23	4	Did not advance	
Prachi Yadav	Women's VL2	1:06.83	4	1:05.66	3 FA	1:08:55	8

FB = Final B (non-medal) FA = Final A (medal)

== Powerlifting ==
Two men (Parmjeet Kumar and Ashok Malik) and two women (Sakina Khatun and Kasthuri Rajamani) secured their Paralympic berths through the Paralympic Qualification rankings after having completed the mandatory requirements of competing in certain tournaments.

Athlete	Event	Score	Rank
Parmjeet Kumar	Men's -49 kg	150	8
Ashok Malik	Men's -65 kg	199	6
Sakina Khatun	Women's -45 kg	86	7
Kasthuri Rajamani	Women's -67 kg	106	8

== Rowing ==
India qualified one boat in mixed double sculls through the 2024 Asian / Oceania Continental Qualification Regatta held in Chungju, South Korea.

Athlete	Event	Heats		Repechage		Final	
Athlete	Event	Time	Rank	Time	Rank	Time	Rank
Anita Anita; Narayana Konganapalle	PR3 mixed double sculls	8:06.84	5 R	7:54.33	3 FB	8:16.96	8

Legend: R = Repechage; FB = Final B (non-medal)

== Shooting ==
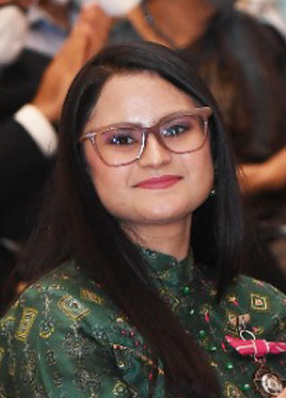
Avani Lekhara won a gold medal in the women's R2 10 m air rifle standing SH1 event to become the first Indian woman paralympic athlete to win multiple gold medals.

India entered nine para shooters after achieving quota places through various qualifying events after they attained the minimum qualifying score (MQS) for the respective events by 15 July 2024. Rubina Francis and Swaroop Unhalkar received a bi-partite invitation from the International Paralympic Committee for the Games.

Men

Athlete	Event	Qualification		Final	
Athlete	Event	Points	Rank	Points	Rank
Rudransh Khandelwal	P1 10 m air pistol SH1	561	9	Did not advance	
Manish Narwal	P1 10 m air pistol SH1	566	5 Q	234.9	2nd place, silver medalist(s)
Swaroop Unhalkar	R1 10 m air rifle standing SH1	613.4	14	Did not advance	

Women

Athlete	Event	Qualification		Final	
Athlete	Event	Points	Rank	Points	Rank
Avani Lekhara	R2 10 m air rifle SH1	625.8	2 Q	249.7 PR	1st place, gold medalist(s)
Mona Agarwal	R2 10 m air rifle SH1	623.1	5 Q	228.7	3rd place, bronze medalist(s)
Avani Lekhara	R8 50 m rifle 3 positions SH1	1159	7 Q	420.6	5
Mona Agarwal	R8 50 m rifle 3 positions SH1	1147	13	Did not advance	
Rubina Francis	P2 10 m air pistol SH1	556	6 Q	211.1	3rd place, bronze medalist(s)

Mixed

Athlete	Event	Qualification		Final	
Athlete	Event	Points	Rank	Points	Rank
Avani Lekhara	R3 10 m air rifle prone SH1	632.8	11	Did not advance	
Sidhartha Babu	R3 10 m air rifle prone SH1	628.3	28	Did not advance	
Sriharsha Davareddi	R4 10 m air rifle SH2	630.7	9	Did not advance	
Sriharsha Davareddi	R5 10 m rifle prone SH2	630.2	26	Did not advance	
Mona Agarwal	R6 50 m rifle Prone SH1	610.5	30	Did not advance	
Sidhartha Babu	R6 50 m rifle Prone SH1	615.8	22	Did not advance	
Nihal Singh	P3 25 m pistol SH1	569	10	Did not advance	
Amir Bhat	P3 25 m pistol SH1	568	11	Did not advance	
Nihal Singh	P4 50 m pistol SH1	522	19	Did not advance	
Rudransh Khandelwal	P4 50 m pistol SH1	517	22	Did not advance	

Legend: Q = Qualified for the next phase; PR = Paralympic Record

== Swimming ==
India qualified one swimmer to compete at the games after Suyash Jadhav achieved the Minimum Qualification Standard (MQS) in the butterfly event.

Men

Athlete	Events	Heats		Final	
Athlete	Events	Time	Rank	Time	Rank
Suyash Jadhav	50 m butterfly S7	33.47	10	Did not advance	

== Table tennis ==
India entered two athletes for the Paralympic Games. Sonalben Patel and Bhavina Patel qualified through the International Table Tennis Federation World Rankings.

Athlete	Event	Round of 16	Quarterfinals	Semifinals	Final / BM	
Athlete	Event	Opposition Result	Opposition Result	Opposition Result	Opposition Result	Rank
Sonalben Patel	Women's individual C3	Mužinić (CRO); L 1–3	Did not advance			
Bhavina Patel	Women's individual C4	Verdín (MEX); W 3–0	Zhou (CHN); L 1–3	Did not advance		
Sonalben Patel; Bhavina Patel	Women's doubles D10	—N/a	Jung / Moon (KOR); L 1–3	Did not advance		

Legend: W = Won; L = Lost

== Taekwondo ==
Aruna Tanwar qualified for the event following her win in the 2024 Asian Qualification Tournament in Tai'an, China.

Tanwar took an early exit from the competition after losing to her Turkish opponent, Nurcihan Ekinci in the Round of 16.

Athlete	Event	First round	Quarterfinals	Semifinals	Repechage	Final / BM	
Athlete	Event	Opposition Result	Opposition Result	Opposition Result	Opposition Result	Opposition Result	Rank
Aruna Tanwar	Women's –47 kg	Ekinci (TUR); L 0–19	Did not advance				

Legend: L = Lost

== See also ==
- India at the Paralympics
- India at the 2024 Summer Olympics
