= India at the 2023 World Para Athletics Championships =

- Flag of India
- WA code: IND
- National federation: Paralympic Committee Of India
- Website: https://www.paralympicindia.org.in/

in Paris, France 8–17 July 2023
- Competitors: 45 (34 men and 11 women) in 35 events
- Medals Ranked 14th: Gold 3 Silver 4 Bronze 2 Total 9

India is scheduled to compete at the 2023 World Para Athletics Championships in Paris, France from 8 to 17 July 2023

== Medalists ==
Medal	Name	Event	Date
1st place, gold medalist(s)	Sumit Antil	Javelin Throw F-64	13 July
1st place, gold medalist(s)	Sachin Sarjerao Khilari	Shot Put F-46	14 July
1st place, gold medalist(s)	Ajeet Singh	Javelin Throw F-46	16 July
2nd place, silver medalist(s)	Nishad Kumar	High Jump T-47	11 July
2nd place, silver medalist(s)	Yogesh Kathuniya	Discus Throw F-56	12 July
2nd place, silver medalist(s)	Shailesh Kumar	High Jump T-63	13 July
2nd place, silver medalist(s)	Rinku	Javelin Throw F-46	16 July
3rd place, bronze medalist(s)	Praveen Kumar	High Jump T-64	10 July
3rd place, bronze medalist(s)	Ekta Bhayan	Club Throw F-51	16 July

== Results ==
Key

- Q = Qualified for the next round
- q = Qualified for the next round as a fastest loser or, in field events, by position without achieving the qualifying target
- NR = National record
- PB = Personal best
- SB = Season best
- N/A = Round not applicable for the event

=== Men ===
Track

Athlete	Event	Heats		Final	
Athlete	Event	Result	Rank	Result	Rank
Shreyansh Trivedi	100m T-37	12.11PB	7q	12.03PB	6
Shreyansh Trivedi	200m T-37	24.82PB	8q	25.26	8
Manoj Baskar	100m T-44	—		12.67	6
Vijay Kumar	100m T-44	—		12.59	7
Gavit Dilip Mahadu	400m T-47	49.58PB	2Q	49.08PB	4

Field

Athlete	Event	Final	
Athlete	Event	Distance	Position
Nishad Kumar	High Jump T-47	2.09AR	2nd place, silver medalist(s)
Ram Pal	High Jump T-47	1.95	5
Shailesh Kumar	High Jump T-63	1.83	2nd place, silver medalist(s)
Sharad Kumar	High Jump T-63	1.77	5
Mariyappan Thangavelu	High Jump T-63	1.80	4
Injamuri Syam	High Jump T-64	1.69	8
Renu Unni	High Jump T-64	1.85	5
Praveen Kumar	High Jump T-64	2.01SB	3rd place, bronze medalist(s)
Dharambir	Club Throw F-51	30.40	5
Pranav Soorma	Club Throw F-51	28.77	6
Pranav Soorma	Discus Throw F-52	11.43AR	10
Ajitkumar Amrutlal Panchal	Discus Throw F-52	21.17AR	DSQ
Neeraj Yadav	Shot Put F-55	9.29	12
Neeraj Yadav	Discus Throw F-56	35.54SB	8
Yogesh Kathuniya	Discus Throw F-56	43.17	2nd place, silver medalist(s)
Sagar Thayat	Discus Throw F-64	48.68AR	8
Monu Ghanghas	Discus Throw F-11	35.18	6
Monu Ghanghas	Shot Put F-11	11.57SB	6
Manjeet	Javelin Throw F-13	54.56PB	9
Ajeet Singh	Javelin Throw F-46	65.41CR	1st place, gold medalist(s)
Sundar Singh Gurjar	Javelin Throw F-46	61.81	4
Rinku	Javelin Throw F-46	65.38SB	2nd place, silver medalist(s)
Abhishek Chamoli	Javelin Throw F-54	24.16SB	3
Puspendra Singh	Javelin Throw - F64	62.09WR	5
Sandeep Chaudhary	Javelin Throw - F64	61.33	6
Sumit Antil	Javelin Throw - F64	70.83WR	1st place, gold medalist(s)
Navdeep	Javelin Throw F-41	40.05	4
Ravi Rongali	Javelin Throw F-41	25.48	11
Ravi Rongali	Shot Put F-40	8.90PB	5
Arvind	Shot Put F-35	13.43	6
Sachin Khilari Sarjerao	Shot Put F-46	16.21AR	1st place, gold medalist(s)
Hotozhe SEMA Hokato	Shot Put F-57	14.76PB	4
Soman Rana	Shot Put F-57	13.40	7
Sachan Devershee	Shot Put F-33	6.69PB	11

=== Women ===
Track

Athlete	Event	Heats		Final	
Athlete	Event	Result	Rank	Result	Rank
Raju Rakshitha	1500m T-11	5:26.47SB	5q	5:24.95SB	5
Simran	100m T-12	DSQ		Did Not Advance	
Simran	200m T-12	DSQ			

Field

Athlete	Event	Final	
Athlete	Event	Distance	Position
Chakkungal Parambil	Long Jump T-47	5.12	10
ABROAL Mrunmaiy	Club Throw - F51	9.70	5
LAKRA Kashish	Club Throw - F51	13.24PB	4
Ekta Bhyan	Club Throw - F51	17.93AR	3rd place, bronze medalist(s)
Ekta Bhyan	Discus Throw F-53	6.56AR	7
Lakhani Kanchan	Discus Throw F-53	9.97PB	6
Karam Joyti	Discus Throw F-55	18.76	9
Kasana Sakshi	Discus Throw F-55	21.73PB	6
Pooja	Discus Throw F-55	16.67	11
Pooja	Javelin Throw F-54	13.31	11
Pooja	Shot Put F-54	5.58SB	6
Jadhav Bhagyashri Mahavrao	Shot Put F-34	7.23	4
