= Rohit Kumar (para athlete) =

Indian para athlete

Personal information
- Born: 5 August 1992 (age 33) Rohtak, India

Sport
- Sport: Paralympic athletics
Medal record
Representing India
Asian Para Games
| Bronze medal – third place | 2022 Hangzhou | Shot put F46 |

Rohit Kumar (born 5 August 1992) is an Indian para athlete who competes in the shot put F46 category. He qualified to represent India at the 2024 Summer Paralympics at Paris. He is currently supported by OGQ.

== Career ==
Kumar won a bronze medal at the 2022 Asian Para Games at Hangzhou, China with a 14.56m throw. Compatriot Sachin Sarjerao Khilari won a gold with a games record of 16.03m.
