= Athletics at the 2024 Summer Paralympics – Men's club throw F51 =

Men's Club throw F32 at the XVII Paralympic Games
- Venue: Stade de France
- Dates: 5 September 2024
- Competitors: 10 from 6 nations

Medalists
1st place, gold medalist(s)		Dharambir	India
2nd place, silver medalist(s)		Pranav Soorma	India
3rd place, bronze medalist(s)		Zeljko Dimitrijevic	Serbia

The Athletics at the 2024 Summer Paralympics – Men's club throw F51 event at the 2024 Summer Paralympics in Paris, took place on 5 September 2024.

== Records ==
Prior to the competition, the existing records were as follows:

World record	Musa Taimazov (RUS)	36.22m	(Russia) Cheboksary	12 August 2023
Paralympic record	Musa Taimazov; RPC	35.42m	(Japan) Tokyo	1 September 2021

== Results ==
=== Final ===
The final in this classification took place on 1 September 2024:

Rank	Athlete	Nationality	Class	1	2	3	4	5	6	Best	Notes
1st place, gold medalist(s)	Dharambir	India	F51	x	x	x	x	34.92	31.59	34.92	AR
2nd place, silver medalist(s)	Pranav Soorma	India	F51	34.59	34.19	x	34.50	33.90	33.70	34.59	
3rd place, bronze medalist(s)	Zeljko Dimitrijevic	Serbia	F51	32.70	34.18	32.91	33.70	32.46	31.80	34.18	
4	Filip Graovac	Serbia	F51	31.39	32.09	32.21	31.18	31.27	31.40	32.21	
5	Mario Santana Ramos Hernandez	Mexico	F51	29.81	31.76	x	x	x	29.27	31.76	
6	Uladzislau Hyrb	Neutral Paralympic Athletes	F51	28.09	27.75	x	30.69	30.78	31.69	31.69	
7	Aleksandar Radisic	Serbia	F51	x	31.32	31.32	x	31.08	30.96	31.32	
8	Marian Kureja	Slovenia	F51	x	x	29.30	29.26	29.46	x	29.30	
9	Michal Enge	Czech Republic	F51	27.04	27.37	27.65	27.34	28.32	27.23	28.32	
10	Amit Kumar Kumar	India	F51	x	21.49	x	23.96	x	x	23.96	YC R34.6b

Notes:Yellow Card –Amit Kumar Kumar– WPA Rule 34.6b (All substances used on the hands and on the implements shall be easily removable from the implement using a wet cloth and shall not leave any residue.)
