= Arvind Malik =

Indian para athlete

Personal information
- Born: 14 June 1993 (age 33) Haryana, India

Sport
- Country: India
- Sport: Para-athletics
- Coached by: Surender
Medal record
Representing India
Men's shot put
Asia Oceania Championship
Gold medal – first place	2016 Dubai	Discus - F37
Bronze medal – third place	2016 Dubai	Javelin - F37
IWAS World Games
Silver medal – second place	2022 Portugal	Shotput - F35

Arvind Malik (born 14 June 1993) is an Indian para athlete from Haryana. He competes in the shot put F35 category. He qualified to represent India at the 2024 Summer Paralympics at Paris.

== Early life ==
Malik is from Haryana, India. Hit by a cricket ball on his head at the age of 9, he suffered an injury that was diagnosed with neural damage which paralyzed his left leg. His younger brother, a hammer throw athlete, encouraged him to take up para throws. He started with discus throw but later shifted to shot put. He is currently supported by Olympic Gold Quest, a sports NGO.

== Career ==
Malik finished 7th at the delayed 2020 Tokyo Paralympics in the men's shot put F35 event with a best throw of 13.48m in a field of eight throwers. He took part in the 2018 Asian Para Games. A few months before the Asiad, he shifted from F37 category to F35, where throwers use standing position, but still finished fifth.
