= Dipesh Kumar =

Indian para athlete (born 2005)

Personal information
- Nationality: India
- Born: 1 February 2005 (age 21) Uttar Pradesh, India
- Height: 185
- Weight: 92

Sport
- Sport: Paralympic athletics
- Disability: Sci
- Disability class: F54-55
- Event: Javelin
- Coached by: Shalendar singh

Achievements and titles
- Personal best: 30.51

Dipesh Kumar (born 1 February 2005) is an Indian para athlete from Uttar Pradesh. He competes in men's javelin throw in F54 category. He qualified to represent India at the 2024 Summer Paralympics at Paris, France.

He won a gold medal in the Khelo India Para Games at New Delhi in December 2023.

A national record holder 27.90m in Indian open international para athletes championship 2024. gold medal in world ability youth games 2024 with throw 29.24 meters.
