= Sriharsha Ramakrishna Davareddi =

Indian para athlete

Sriharsha Devaraddi Ramakrishna (born 1980) is an Indian para shooter from Karnataka. He competes in men's R4 10m air rifle standing SH2, mixed 10m air rifle std SH2, R5 and mixed 10m prn SH2. He qualified to represent India at the 2024 Summer Paralympics at Paris. He became the second Indian shooter to qualify for the Paralympics.

== Early life ==
Ramakrishna was born in Dharwad, Karnataka. He worked an area manager for an insurance company in Hubbali before he met with an accident in 2013. He suffered an injury to his spinal cord after he fell on a gravel road from his two wheeler. Later, he took up shooting and trained under his first coach Ravichandra Balehosur, at the Hubballi Sports Shooting Academy. He lives in Hubballi with his wife, son and parents, Lalita and Devaraddi.

== Career ==
Ramakrishna finished 26th in the mixed 10m air rifle prone (SH2) qualification round of the Paris Paralympics, with a total score of 630.2. Earlier in June 2022, he earned a quota for the Paris Paralympics after securing a gold medal in R4-mixed 10m rifle standing SH2 with 253.1 points at the Chateauroux Para Shooting World Cup. Earlier, he represented India at the Sydney 2019 World Shooting Para Sport Championships, at Sydney, Australia in October 2019.
