= Athletics at the 2024 Summer Paralympics – Women's 100 metres T35 =

Women's 100 metres T35 at the XVII Paralympic Games
- Venue: Stade de France
- Dates: 30 August 2024
- Competitors: 9 from 7 nations
- Winning time: 13.58

Medalists
1st place, gold medalist(s)		Zhou Xia	China
2nd place, silver medalist(s)		Guo Qianqian	China
3rd place, bronze medalist(s)		Preethi Pal	India

100 metres at the 2024 Summer Paralympics
Men · T11 · T12 · T13 · T34 · T35 · T36 · T37 · T38 · T44 · T47 · T51 · T52 · T53 · T54 · T63 · T64
Women · T11 · T12 · T13 · T34 · T35 · T36 · T37 · T38 · T47 · T53 · T54 · T63 · T64

The women's 100 metres T35 event at the 2024 Summer Paralympics in Paris took place on 30 August 2024.

The T35 category is for ambulant athletes with cerebral palsy. The typical T35 athlete may need assistive devices for walking. The athlete may have sufficient function to run but demonstrates poor balance.

== Records ==
Prior to the competition, the existing records were as follows:

World record	Zhou Xia (CHN)	13.00	(Japan) Tokyo	27 August 2021
Paralympic record	Zhou Xia (CHN)	13.00	(Japan) Tokyo	27 August 2021

Area	Time		Athlete	Location	Date
Africa	17.90		(South Africa) Chenelle van Zyl	(South Africa) Stellenbosch	1 April 2014
America	15.78		(United States) Brianna Salinaro	(United States) Miramar	20 July 2024
Asia	13.00	WR	(China) Zhou Xia	(Japan) Tokyo	27 August 2021
Europe	13.92		(United Kingdom) Maria Lyle	(Qatar) Doha	29 October 2015
Oceania	13.13		(Australia) Isis Holt	(Japan) Tokyo	27 August 2021

== Results ==
=== Final ===
The final took place on 30 August 2024:

Rank	Lane	Name	Nationality	Time	Notes
1st place, gold medalist(s)	5	Zhou Xia	China	13.58	SB
2nd place, silver medalist(s)	6	Guo Qianqian	China	13.74	PB
3rd place, bronze medalist(s)	7	Preethi Pal	India	14.21	PB
4	4	Fatimah Suwaed	Iraq	14.82	
5	3	Ingrid Renecka	Poland	15.29	PB
6	8	Jagoda Kibil	Poland	15.54	
7	9	Nienke Timmer	Netherlands	15.69	
8	2	Isabelle Foerder	Germany	16.36	
9	1	Saltanat Abilkhassymkyzy	Kazakhstan	16.52	
Source:				Wind: -0.1 m/s	
