= Guo Qianqian =

Chinese para-athlete (born 2004)

Personal information
- Nationality: Chinese
- Born: 13 April 2004 (age 22) Jinan, China

Sport
- Sport: Para-athletics
- Disability class: T35
- Event: Sprints
Medal record
Women's para-athletics
Representing China
Paralympic Games
Silver medal – second place	2024 Paris	100 m T35
Silver medal – second place	2024 Paris	200 m T35
World Championships
Gold medal – first place	2025 New Delhi	100 m T35
Gold medal – first place	2025 New Delhi	200 m T35
Silver medal – second place	2023 Paris	100 m T35
Silver medal – second place	2024 Kobe	100 m T35
Asian Para Games
Silver medal – second place	2022 Hangzhou	100 m T35
Silver medal – second place	2022 Hangzhou	200 m T35

Guo Qianqian (born 13 April 2004) is a Chinese T35 Paralympic sprint runner. She represented China at the 2024 Summer Paralympics.

== Career ==
Guo represented China at the 2023 World Para Athletics Championships and won a silver medal in the 100 metres T35 event. She again represented China at the 2024 World Para Athletics Championships and won a silver medal in the 100 metres T35 event.

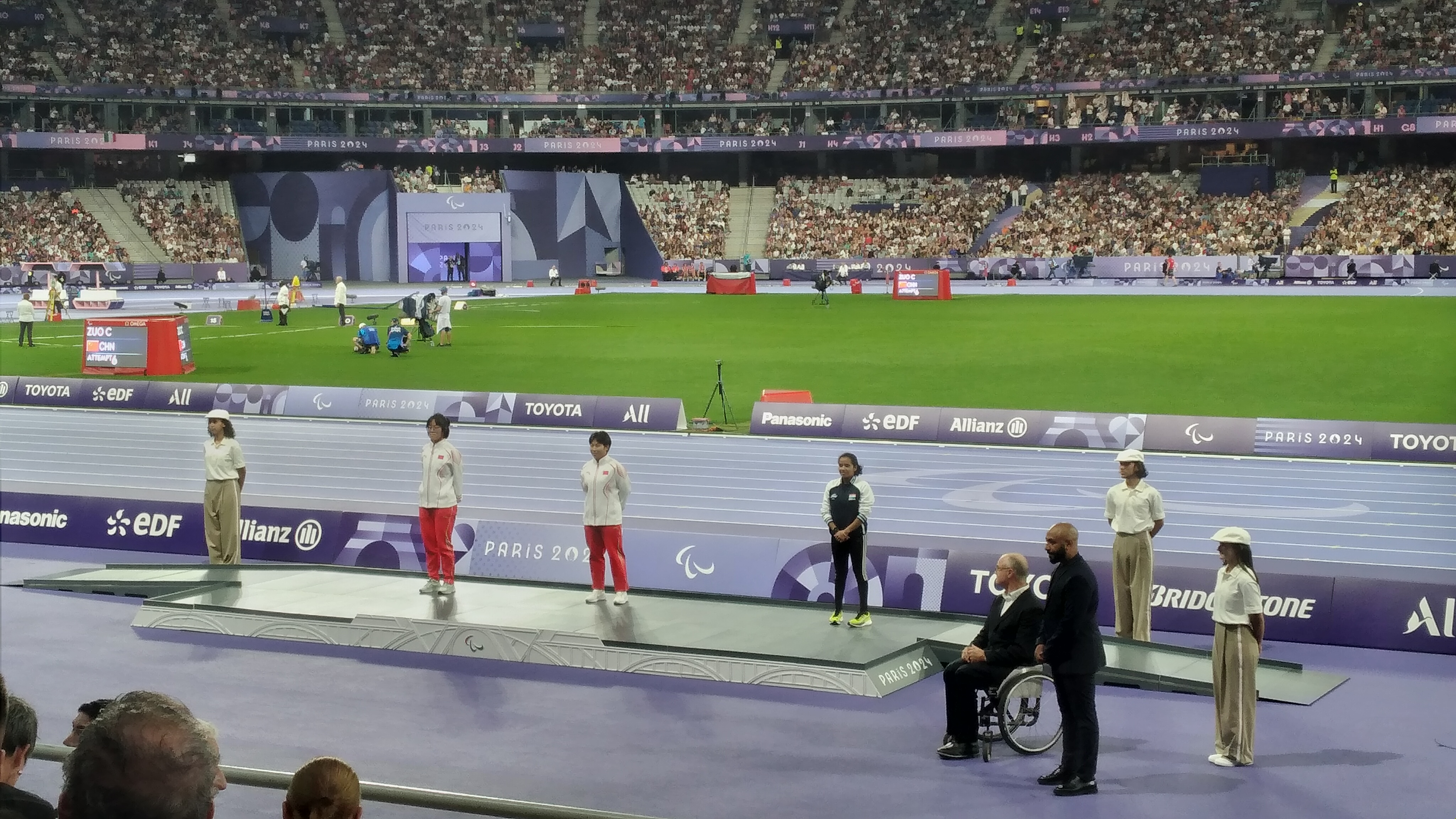
Before receiving the silver medal for the 200 metres T35 event at the 2024 Summer Paralympics

Guo represented China at the 2024 Summer Paralympics and won a silver medal in the 100 metres T35 and the 200 metres T35 events.
