= Manjeet =

Manjeet is a given name. Notable people with the name include:

- Manjeet Chillar (born 1986), Indian professional kabaddi player
- Manjeet Kaur (born 1982), Indian sprint athlete from Punjab who specializes in 400 metres
- Manjeet Kullar, actress in Indian movies and television
- Manjeet Maan, Indian producer and director of Indian Punjab films
- Manjeet Mann, actress and author
- Manjeet Singh Ral (born 1985), known by the stage-name Manj Musik, Indian music composer, singer and film scorer
- Manjeet Shrestha (born 1984), Nepalese cricketer
- Manjeet Singh (cricketer) (born 1991), Indian first-class cricketer
- Manjeet Singh (rower) (born 1988) represented India the Men's Lightweight Double Sculls at the 2008 and 2012 London Olympics

== See also ==
- Maneet
- Manj (disambiguation)
