= Yash Kumar (paracanoeing) =

Indian para athlete

Yash Kumar (born 14 April 1997) is an Indian para-athlete from Uttar Pradesh. He competes in canoeing. He qualified for the 2024 Summer Paralympics in the canoeing men's KL1 200m event. He qualified for the semifinals at the Paralympics, where the winners of each heat and the top three in the semifinals, qualify for the final. He finished fifth in the men's kayak single 200m KL1 semifinal.

== Early life and education ==
Kumar is from Agra, but resides in Bhopal. He did his schooling at SDK Adarsh High School and later went to junior college at Krishna Prayag inter college at Tajganj. He trains under coach Mayank Thakur at the National level. Locally, he trains at the lower lake in Bhopal. During his childhood, he lived at his uncle's place. His uncle Durg Vijay Singh, a former All India Radio employee and his aunt, Gayatri Devi, a Hindi teacher, supported him.

== Career ==
India earned quota places for the following events through the 2023 ICF Canoe Sprint World Championships in Duisburg, Germany; and 2023. He also won a silver in the Asian Canoeing and Para Canoeing Sprint Championship at Tokyo in April 2024. He was ranked fifth in the ICF Paracanoe World Championships in Men's Canoe single VL1 200m in 2019 held at Szeged, Hungary and again finished fifth at the same venue in the 2024 ICF Paracanoe World Championships.
