= Sandip Sargar =

Indian para athlete

Personal information
- Born: 13 February 1993 (age 33) Maharashtra, India

Sport
- Sport: Para-athletics
- Disability class: F44
- Event: Javelin throw
Medal record
Men's para-athletics
Representing India
World Championships
Gold medal – first place	2025 New Delhi	Javelin throw F44
Asian Para Games
Gold medal – first place	2026 Aichi-Nagoya	Javelin throw F44

Sandip Sanjay Sargar (born 13 February 1993) is an Indian para-athlete who competes in javelin throw. He represented India at the 2024 Paris Paralympics. He is currently supported by Olympic Gold Quest.

== Career ==
In June 2022, Sargar won a gold for India at the 2022 World Para Athletics Grand Prix in Tunis after missing out to the Tokyo Paralympics where he was named as a reserve in the Indian team. Later, he represented India 2023 FAZZA World Para Athletics Grand Prix in Dubai with a fourth place and went on to win a gold at the 2023 World Para Athletics Grand Prix, Dubai. In 2024, he took a 5th place at the 2024 World Para Athletics Championships, Kobe to book an Olympic Quota place. He also won a gold at the 2024 World Para Athletics Grand Prix at Sharjah.
