= Amisha Rawat =

Indian para athlete (born 2003)

Personal information
- Born: 20 May 2003 (age 23) Rudraprayag, Uttarakhand, India

Sport
- Sport: Paralympic athletics

Amisha Rawat (born 20 May 2003) is an Indian para athlete from Uttarakhand. She competes in the shot put F46 category. She qualified to represent India at the 2024 Summer Paralympics at Paris.

== Early life and education ==
Rawat is from Rudraprayag, Uttarakhand. She is born without a hand below her elbow. Her physical education teacher, Anil Kandwal, introduced her to para athletics and she took part in the Uttarakhand State Para Championship. She is doing her under graduation studies at Jawaharlal Nehru University, New Delhi.

== Career ==
Rawat won two gold medals in her first event at the Uttarakhand State Para Athletics Championships where she took part in 100m and 200m run. Later, she shifted to throws. In 2022, in her first international even at the Grand Prix of Switzerland, she won a bronze medal in javelin throw. Later, she represented India at the 2022 Asian Para Games at Huangzhou, China.
