= Bhagyashree Jadhav =

Indian para athlete

Personal information
- Born: 24 May 1985 (age 41) Maharashtra, India

Sport
- Sport: Paralympic athletics
Medal record
Representing India
Women's para-athletics
Asian Para Games
Silver medal – second place	2022 Hangzhou	Shot put F34

Bhagyashree Jadhav (born 24 May 1985) is a para athlete from Maharashtra. She was part of the Indian para team for the 2022 Asian Para Games at Hangzhou, China. She won a silver medal in shot put F34 category. She threw a distance of 7.54 metres. She qualified to represent India at the 2024 Summer Paralympics at Paris, her second Paralympics. She is named as the flagbearer for India at the Paris Paralympics opening ceremony along with Sumit Antil.

== Personal life ==
Bhagyashree hails from Honvadaj in Mukhed taluk, Nanded district, Maharashtra. After an accident in 2006, she began using a wheelchair and experienced depression. With the help of a Marathi journalist Prakash Kamble, she took up wheelchair sports.

== Career ==
Bhagyashree won the silver medal at the 2022 Asian Para Games. Earlier, she was part of the Indian team at the 2020 Summer Paralympics where she entered the final and was ranked 7th. In 2021, she won a bronze medal at the Feja World Cup. In 2019, she took part in the World Para Athletics Games in China and won two bronze medals. She took up sports in 2017 and won two gold and a bronze in the Mayor's Cup at Pune.

== Award ==
In 2021, she won the 'Dr. Pradnya Nitin Joshi Smriti Kritagyata Sanman' award by Galaxy Hospital, Nanded.
