= Praveen Kumar (para-athlete, born 1992) =

Indian para athlete

Personal information
- Born: 20 August 1992 (age 33) New Delhi, India

Sport
- Sport: Paralympic athletics

Praveen Kumar (20 August 1992) is an Indian para athlete who competes in javelin throw. He qualified to represent India at the 2024 Summer Paralympics at Paris. He will compete in the men's javelin throw F57 category at the Paralympics.

== Career ==
He won a gold medal in the National Games 2024. He represented India at the 2022 Asian Para Games at Hangzhou, China and finished fourth with a throw of 41.31m. In 2024, he took part in the World Championships at Kobe, Japan, and finished 7th with a throw of 42.87m.
