= Maneet =

Maneet is an Indian feminine given name. Notable people with the name include:

- Maneet Ahuja (born 1984), American author, journalist, television news producer, and hedge fund specialist
- Maneet Chauhan (born 1976), US-based, Indian television personality and chef
