= Rinku Hooda =

Indian para javelin thrower

Personal information
- Born: 1 January 1999 (age 27) Dhamar, Haryana, India

Sport
- Sport: Para-athletics
- Disability class: F46
- Event: Javelin throw

Achievements and titles
- Personal best: 66.37 m CR
Medal record
Men's para-athletics
Representing India
World Championships
Gold medal – first place	2025 New Delhi	Javelin throw F46
Silver medal – second place	2023 Paris	Javelin throw F46
Asian Para Games
Gold medal – first place	2026 Aichi–Nagoya	Javelin throw F46
Silver medal – second place	2022 Hangzhou	Javelin throw F46
Bronze medal – third place	2018 Jakarta	Javelin throw F46
Asian Youth Para Games
Gold medal – first place	2017 Dubai	Javelin throw F46

Rinku Hooda (born 1 January 1999) is an Indian para javelin thrower who competes in the F46 category. He represented India 2016 and the 2024 Paralympics where he finished fifth in both instances.

== Early life and background ==
Rinku is from a small village on the outskirts of Dhamar, Rohtak, Haryana. He was introduced to the sport of Javelin by fellow Indian para athlete Amit Kumar Saroha. As a young boy, he had lost his left arm in an accident involving a fan blade. He is supported by Olympic Gold Quest, a sports NGO.

== Career ==
Rinku competed in Rio in the same category as fellow Indian Para athlete and 2004 Paralympic Games Gold medalist Devendra Jhajharia. He came fifth, securing a new personal best of 54.39m.

He won a gold at the 22nd National Para Athletics Championships at Bambolim, Goa in March 2024. Earlier, he won a silver at the fourth Asian Para Games by throwing the javelin at 67.08m in China. In May 2024, he won a bronze in the men's F46 javelin throw event at the World Para Athletics Championship at Kobe, Japan.

== Achievements ==
Paralympics

Year	Venue	Event	Score	Result
2016	Rio de Janeiro	javelin	54.39 PB	5th Rank

World Championships

Year	Venue	Event	Score	Result
2017	London	javelin	55.12	4th Rank
