= Kanchan Lakhani =

Indian para athlete

Personal information
- Born: 13 March 1984 (age 41) Faridabad, India

Sport
- Sport: Paralympic athletics

Kanchan Lakhani (born 13 March 1984) is an Indian para athlete from Faridabad, Haryana. She qualified to represent India at the 2024 Summer Paralympics at Paris. With a personal best of 10.06m, she finished 7th in the women's discus throw F53 category at the Paralympics. She is ranked 3rd in the World Para Athletics Rankings 2024 in the F53 javelin throw for women. She is also ranked World 7th in discus throw.

== Early life and education ==
Lakhani is from Faridabad, Haryana. Her father Manohar Lal, mother Pushpa, and brothers Sunil and Kamal, supported her. She did her schooling at K L Mehta Dayanand Senior Secondary School. She met with a train accident on 4 September 2008 and lost her hand. She was also paralysed from waist below due to the injury to spinal cord. In 2016, she met coach Narsi Ram at Raja Nahar Singh Stadium and he convinced her to take up athletics and trained her in throws.

== Career ==
In 2022, Lakhani took part in the World Para Grand Prix Athletics Championships in Tunisia. In 2021, she won gold medals in javelin and discus and a silver in shot put at the third Indian Open National Para Athlete Championships at Bangalore. In 2018, she represented India at the World Para Grand Prix Athletics Championships in Paris. The next year in 2019, she also took part in the World Para Grand Prix Athletics Championships in Beijing. Earlier in 2017, she won three gold medals in the National Para Athletics Championships in Jaipur. In March 2018, she won a gold at the 18th National Para Athletics held in Panchkula.

Dainik Jagran, a national newspaper, gave her the Nari Shaktikaran Award on Women's Day.
