= Manu (para athlete) =

Indian para athlete

Personal information
- Born: 28 February 1999 (age 27) Jind, Haryana, India

Sport
- Sport: Paralympic athletics
Medal record
Representing India
Asian Para Games
Bronze medal – third place	2022 Hangzhou	Shot put F37

Manu (born 28 February 1999) is an Indian para athlete who competes in shot put event. He qualified to represent India at the 2024 Summer Paralympics at Paris. He competed in the men's shot put F37 category at the Paralympics and finished sixth with a 13.86m throw.

== Career ==
Manu represented India at the 2022 Asian Para Games at Hangzhou, China and won a bronze medal in the shot put F37 category. In 2024, he represented India at the World Championship in Kobe, Japan where he finished 8th.
