= Mohd Yasser =

Indian para-athlete

Personal information
- Born: 24 December 1993 (age 32) Bathan Khurd, India
- Home town: Mohamadpura, Punjab

Sport
- Country: India
- Sport: Shotput
- Disability class: F-46
- Coached by: Harminderpal Singh Ghuman

Achievements and titles
- National finals: 18th National Para Athletics Championship Panchkula
Medal record
Track and field (athletics)
Representing India
World Para Athletics Championships
Gold medal – first place	2021 Dubai	Shotput - F46
Asian Para Games
Gold medal – first place	2018 Jakarta	Shotput - F46
National Para Athletics Championships
Gold medal – first place	2018 Panchkula	Shotput - F46

Mohd Yasser (born 24 December 1993) is an Indian track and field para-athlete who competes in the Men's Shotput F46.

== Early life ==
When Yasser was 8 years old, he lost his arm.

== Career ==
He represented India at the 2018 Asian Para Games in Jakarta, Indonesia where he won a bronze medal. At World Para Athletics' 2021 Dubai Grand Prix, Yasser won a gold medal with a performance of 14.58m.

Yasser expressed his disappointment for not receiving the promised incentive of ₹50 lakh (equivalent to ₹67 lakh or US$69,000 in 2023) from the government in 2018. The same was eventually given in 2020.
