= Bhavanaben Ajabaji Chaudhary =

Indian para athlete

Personal information
- Born: 1 June 1998 (age 27) Gujarat, India

Sport
- Sport: Paralympic athletics

Bhavanaben Ajabaji Chaudhary (born 1 June 1998) is an Indian para athlete from Gujarat. She competes in women's javelin throw in F46 category. She qualified to represent India at the 2024 Summer Paralympics at Paris, France.

She also represented India at the 2022 Asian Para Games in Hangzhou, China.
