= Bathan Khurd =

- Village
- Location in Punjab, India Bathan Khurd (India)
- Coordinates: 30.77389°N 76.36807°E
- Country: India
- State: Punjab
- District: Fatehgarh Sahib

Government
  - Sarpanch: Jassi Singh
  - Panch (1): Harinder Singh
  - Panch (2): Nirmal Singh

Area
  - Total: 2.48 km^{2} (0.96 sq mi)

Population
  - Total: 812 (approx.)
  - Density: 327/km^{2} (848/sq mi)

Languages
  - Official: Punjabi
- Time zone: UTC+5:30 (IST)
- PIN: 140802
- Telephone code: 01628
- Vehicle registration: PB 49
- Nearest city: Morinda
- Sex ratio: 845:1000 ♂/♀
- Literacy: 60%
- Lok Sabha constituency: Khanna

Bathan Khurd is a small village in the Fatehgarh Sahib district in the Indian State of Punjab. with ex Sarpanch and even considered the best Sarpanch of the village Sardar Randheer Singh Bath who tragically died in 2021 by COVID.
