= Praveen Kumar (wushu) =

Indian Wushu athlete

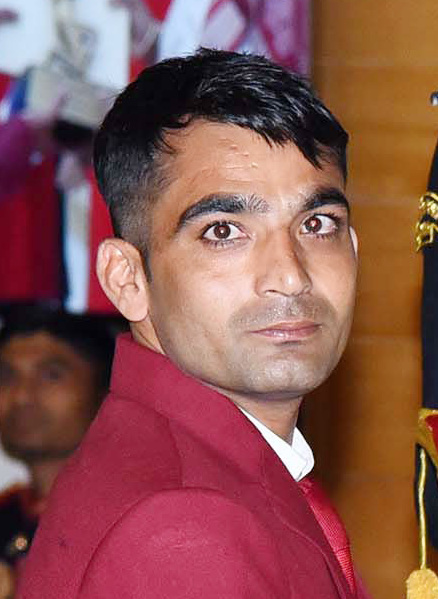

Personal information
- National team: India
- Home town: Haryana, India
- Occupations: Wushu athlete, Boxer
- Employer: Indian Army
- Weight: 48 Kg

Sport
- Sport: Wushu
- Event: Sanda
- Coached by: Rajesh Tailor
Medal record
Men's Sanda
Representing India
World Championships
Gold medal – first place	2019 Shanghai	48 Kg
Asian Championships
Silver medal – second place	2016 Taoyuan	48 Kg

Praveen Kumar is a sanda fighter from India. He became the world champion at the 2019 World Wushu Championships in Shanghai, China in men's Sanda 48 kg, and thus became the first Indian male athlete to a win gold medal at Wushu World Championships.

He also won a silver medal at the 2016 Asian Wushu Championships in Taoyuan, Taiwan, in the men's Sanda 48 kg category. In domestic competition, Kumar won a silver medal in the 2014 junior nationals in and a gold medal at the 2015 senior nationals. He is currently serving in the Indian Army.

== See also ==
- 2019 World Wushu Championships
