= Ravi Rongali =

Indian para athlete (born 1995)

Personal information
- Born: 25 July 1996 (age 29) Visakhapatnam, India

Sport
- Sport: Paralympic athletics
Medal record
Men's para-athletics
Representing India
Asian Para Games
Silver medal – second place	2022 Hangzhou	Shot put F40

Ravi Rongali (born 25 July 1996) is an Indian para athlete from Andhra Pradesh. He competes in the shot put F40 category. He qualified to represent India at the 2024 Summer Paralympics at Paris.

== Early life and education ==
Ravi is from Chirikivanipalem village, Kotapadu mandal, in the erstwhile Visakhapatnam district, which is now in Anakapalle district. His father Demudu Babu and mother Manga are farmers. He is dwarf in nature, standing at 125cms in height. He did his schooling at a residential school in Bheemunipatnam and completed his intermediate at Punyagiri. Later, he completed his graduation at Mahati Degree College, Visakhapatnam. He learnt his basics and initially trained under coach Rahul Balakrishna. He trained for Paralympics under coach Diwakara Thimme Gowda at Sports Authority of India South Centre at Bangalroe. He is currently supported by Olympic Gold Quest, a sports NGO.

== Career ==
Ravi started with badminton and won a silver medal in doubles and a bronze in singles at the National Para Badminton Championships at Bangalore in 2015. He won two more bronze in the Nationals at Faridabad in 2016. Later, he switched to athletics and focused on individual throw events and won a gold medal the at18th National Para Athletics Championships at Faridabad, Haryana in 2018.

In 2021, he made his international debut and finished fourth at the Fazza International Para Athletics Championship in Dubai. He won a gold in the Javelin throw and a silver in the shot put at the 3rd IWAS World Para Athletics Championships in Bangalore, also in 2022. In 2022, he won two more silver medals and Portugal. He clinched a quota berth for the Paris Paralympics at the 2023 World Para Championships in Paris finishing fifth.

He won a silver medal in men's shot put F40 event at the 2022 Asian Para Games at Hangzhou, China.
