= Rubina Francis =

Indian para pistol shooter

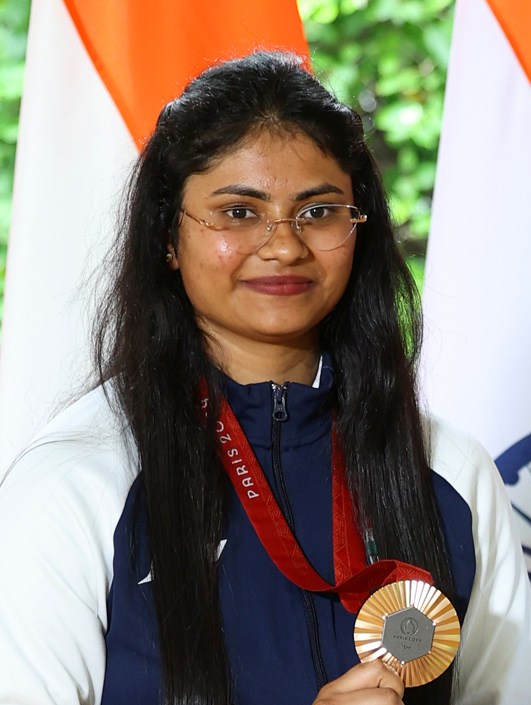
- Francis in September 2024

Personal information
- Full name: Rubina Francis
- Born: Jabalpur,Madhya Pradesh, India

Sport
- Country: India
- Sport: Shooting

Achievements and titles
- Paralympic finals: 2024 Paris (bronze); 2020 Tokyo 7th
Medal record
Representing India
Women's shooting
Paralympic Games
Bronze medal – third place	2024 Paris	P2 10 m air pistol SH1
Asian Para Games
Bronze medal – third place	2022 Hangzhou	10 m air pistol

Rubina Francis (born 1999) is an Indian para pistol shooter. She won the bronze medal at the P2 10 m air pistol SH1 event at the 2024 Paralympics Games. She made history by becoming the first Indian woman to clinch a Paralympics medal in pistol shooting by winning a bronze.

== Early life ==
Rubina is from Jabalpur, Madhya Pradesh.

== Career ==
Rubina was ranked number five by the International Shooting Sport Federation in 2021 in Women's 10m Air Pistol SH1 (World Shooting Para Sport Rankings). She participated in the 2018 Asian Para Games in the P2 - Women's 10M Air Pistol (SH1 Events).

She qualified for the 2020 Summer Paralympics in Tokyo, Japan and finished 7th in the final.

She won a gold medal at the World Shooting Para Sport Championships in Al Ain, United Arab Emirates in 2022.

She qualified to represent India at the 2024 Summer Paralympics at Paris. She secured an Olympic quota berth for Paris Paralympics under bipartite rule in July 2024.
