= Shailesh Kumar (para-athlete) =

Indian para jumper

Personal information
- Born: 8 August 2000 (age 26) Islamnagar, Jamui, Bihar, India
- Education: Bachelor of Mathematics

Sport
- Sport: Para-athletics
- Disability class: T42/63
- Event: High jump

Achievements and titles
- Personal best: 1.91 m CR
Medal record
Men's para-athletics
Representing India
World Championships
Gold medal – first place	2025 New Delhi	High jump T63
Asian Para Games
Gold medal – first place	2022 Hangzhou	High jump T63

Shailesh Kumar (born 8 August 2000) is an Indian para-athlete who specializes in high jump. He won the gold medal at the 2022 Asian Para Games and the 2025 World Championships in the men's high jump T63 event. Kumar also represented India at the 2024 Paris Paralympics, where he narrowly missed the podium with a fourth-place finish in the same event. He won a gold medal in the T63 men's high jump at the Aichi-Nagoya 2026 Asian Para Games.

== Early life and education ==
Kumar is from Islamnagar in Aliganj block, Jamui district, Bihar. He was born to Pratima Devi and Shivnandan Yadav and has two brothers. He did his graduation in mathematics. He is supported by Olympic Gold Quest, a sports NGO. He takes part in T63 classification, which is for athletes with a single leg above the knee amputation and compete with a prosthesis.

== Career ==
He also represented India at the World Para Athletics Championships at Paris in July 2023 and won a silver medal. He qualified for the 2024 Summer Olympics. He won the National Championship at Bhubaneswar in March 2022.

He also broke the nine-year-old Asian Para Games record of 1.80m set by Paralympics medalist Sharad Kumar in 2014. Prime Minister Narendra Modi congratulated Kumar for winning the gold medal. He is currently serving as a Child Development Project Officer (CDPO) in the State of Bihar.
