= Preethi Pal =

Indian para athlete

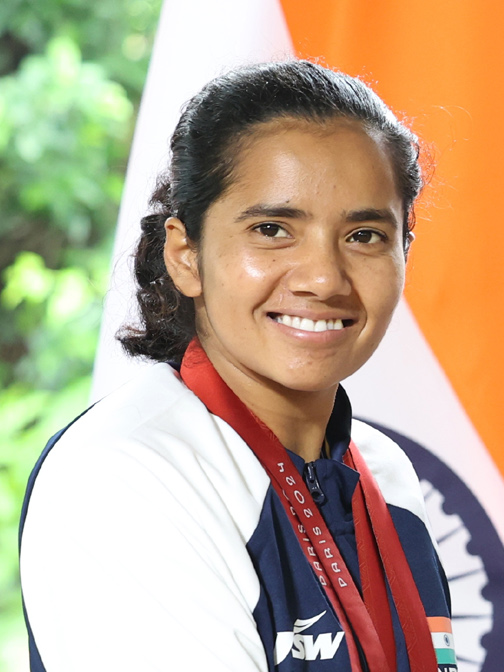
- Pal in 2024

Personal information
- Born: 22 September 2000 (age 26) Meerut, Uttar Pradesh, India

Sport
- Sport: Para athletics
- Disability: Cerebral palsy
- Disability class: T35
- Event: Sprints
Medal record
Representing India
Paralympic Games
Bronze medal – third place	2024 Paris	100 m T35
Bronze medal – third place	2024 Paris	200 m T35
World Championships
Silver medal – second place	2025 New Delhi	100 m T35
Bronze medal – third place	2024 Kobe	100 m T35
Bronze medal – third place	2024 Kobe	200 m T35
Bronze medal – third place	2025 New Delhi	200 m T35

Preethi Pal (born 22 September 2000) is an Indian para athlete. She won two bronze medals at the 2024 Paris Paralympics in the women's 100 m and 200 m T35 race events and created history by becoming the first Indian woman to win two medals in track and field events at Paralympic Games.

== Early life ==
Pal is from Meerut, Uttar Pradesh. She had cerebral palsy during her childhood, and she could not get proper treatment at Meerut. She trains in Delhi under coach Gajendra Singh, who is also the coach of Simran Sharma.

== Career ==
In May 2024, she won a bronze at the World Para Athletics Championships in Kobe, Japan, and clinched an Olympic quota, clocking 30.49 sec in the women's T35 200 m event. She missed a medal twice by a close margin at the 2022 Asian Para Games in Hangzhou, China. Earlier in March 2024, she won two gold in the domestic 6th Indian Open Para Athletics Championships at Bangalore.

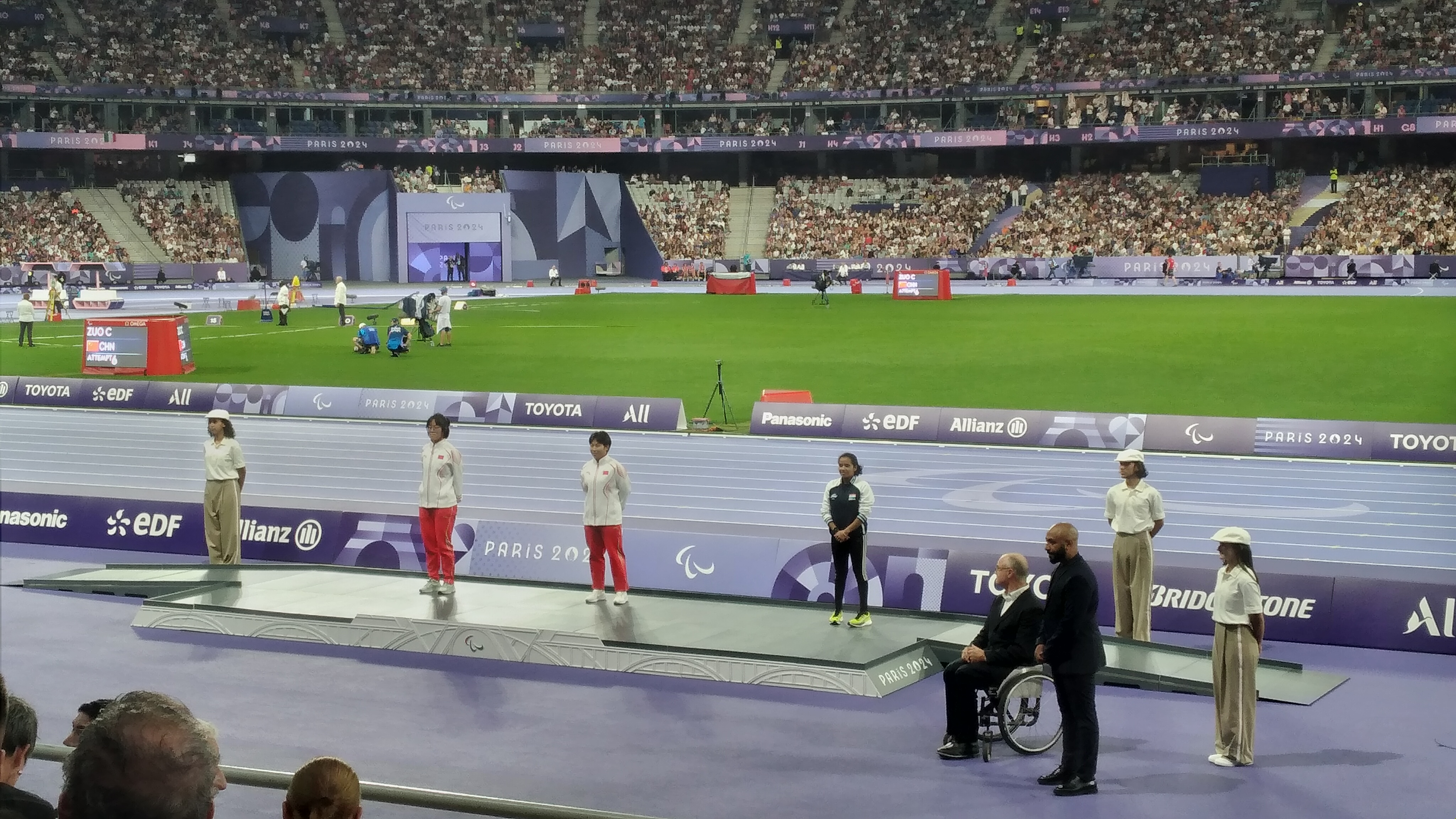
Receiving the bronze medal at the 2024 Summer Paralympics

In 2024, she qualified to represent India at the 2024 Summer Paralympics at Paris and won a bronze medal in the women's 100 m T35 class. She clocked a personal best time of 14.21 seconds.

== Award ==
- Arjuna Award 2024
