= Hokato Hotozhe Sema =

Indian para athlete

Subedar Hokato Hotozhe Sema
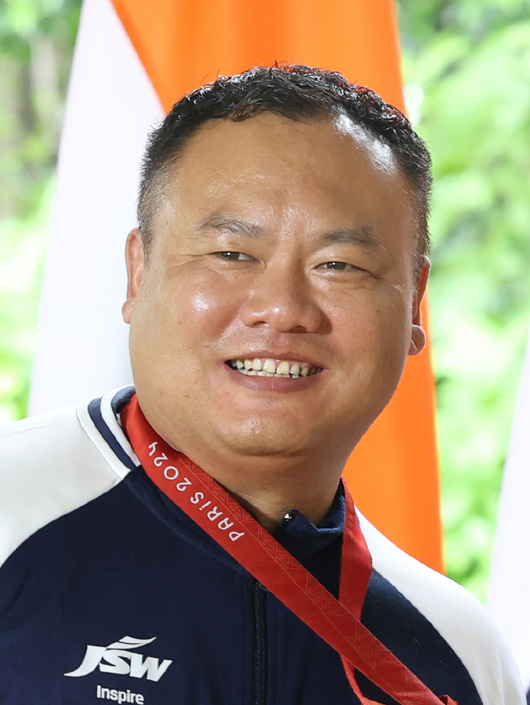

Personal information
- Born: 24 December 1983 (age 42) Niuland district, Nagaland, India
- Military career
- Allegiance: India
- Branch: Indian Army
- Service years: 2000–present
- Rank: Subedar
- Unit: Assam Regiment
- Awards: Ati Vishisht Seva Medal; Vishisht Seva Medal

Sport
- Sport: Shot put
- Event: Men's shot put F57

Achievements and titles
- Paralympic finals: 2024 Paris (bronze)
- Personal bests: Shot put F57: 14.65 m (Paris, 2024)
Medal record
Representing India
Men's para-athletics
Paralympic Games
Bronze medal – third place	2024 Paris	Shot put F57
Asian Para Games
Bronze medal – third place	2022 Hangzhou	Shot put F57
Bronze medal – third place	2026 Aichi-Nagoya	Shot put F56/57
- Updated on 20 October 2026

Hokato Hotozhe Sema, AVSM, VSM (born 24 December 1983) is an Indian para-athlete from Nagaland and a Junior Commissioned Officer in the Indian Army. He competes in men's shot put F57 event. He represented India at the 2024 Summer Paralympics at Paris and won a bronze medal in the event.

== Background ==
Sema was born in P. Vihoto in the Niuland district, Nagaland. He joined as a havildar in the Indian Army and was promoted as Naib Subedar with 9 Assam Regiment. He lost his leg in 2002 during an operation at the Line of Control due to a landmine blast. At 32, he started shotput and trained under coach Rakesh Rawat. A chance meeting with Lieutenant Colonel Gaurav Dutta in 2016 led him to take up shot put. He is currently supported by Olympic Gold Quest, a sports NGO.

== Career ==
Sema won the bronze medal in shotput F-56/57 category event at 2022 Asian Para Games in Hangzhou, China. He also won the bronze medal in shotput F-57 category at the 2024 Summer Paralympics in Paris with a personal best throw of 14.65m.
