= Kapil Parmar =

Indian para athlete

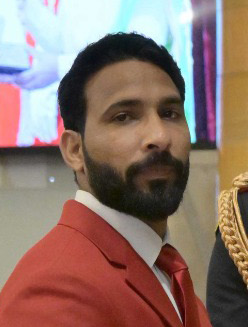
- Parmar in January 2025

Personal information
- Born: 23 June 2000 (age 26) Sehore, Madhya Pradesh, India
- Home town: Sehore
- Occupation: Judoka
- Weight: 60 kg (132 lb)

Sport
- Country: India
- Sport: Para judo
- Disability class: J1
- Weight class: −60 kg

Achievements and titles
- Paralympic Games: 2024 Paris (bronze)
- Highest world ranking: world no.1
Medal record
Men's para judo
Representing India
Paralympic Games
Bronze medal – third place	2024 Paris	−60 kg J1
World Games
Bronze medal – third place	2023 Birmingham	−60 kg
Asian Para Games
Silver medal – second place	2022 Hangzhou	−60 kg
Bronze medal – third place	2026 Aichi–Nagoya	−70 kg
Commonwealth Championships
Gold medal – first place	2019 Birmingham	−60 kg
Grand Prix
Gold medal – first place	2023 Alexandria	−60 kg

Kapil Parmar (born 23 June 2000) is an Indian para-judo player. He clinched the bronze medal at the 2024 Paralympics and made history by winning India's first Paralympic medal in judo. Parmar has also won gold at the 2019 Commonwealth Championships, gold at the 2023 Grand Prix, bronze at the 2023 World Games and silver at the 2022 Asian Para Games.

== Personal life ==
Parmar hails from Bhopal but trains under coach Munawar Anzar Ali Siddiqui at the Indian Para Judo Academy in Lucknow.

== Career ==
Parmar won the silver medal at the Asian Para Games. In 2023, he won the gold at the IBSA Judo Grand Prix in Alexandria. He then won the bronze medal at the IBSA World Games in Birmingham, UK. He also won the gold at the Commonwealth Games in Birmingham. At the 2024 Paris Paralympics, he won the bronze medal.
