= Suyash Jadhav =

Indian Paralympic swimmer

Personal information
- Full name: Suyash Narayan Jadhav
- Nationality: Indian
- Born: 28 November 1993 (age 32) Tal. Karmala Dist. Solapur Maharashtra

Sport
- Country: India
- Sport: Para Swimming
- Coached by: Rajeev RS
Medal record
Para Swimming
Representing India
Asian Para Games
Gold medal – first place	2018 Jakarta	50m Butterfly - S7 (6–7)
Bronze medal – third place	2018 Jakarta	200m Individual Medley - SM7
Bronze medal – third place	2018 Jakarta	50m Freestyle - S7
German Swimming Championships
Silver medal – second place	2016 Wuppertal	Men's 50m Butterfly - S7
Silver medal – second place	2016 Wuppertal	Men's 50m Freestyle - S7
Silver medal – second place	2016 Wuppertal	Men's 200m Individual Medley - S7
Winter Open Polish Championships
Gold medal – first place	2015 Poland	Men's 50m Butterfly - S7
Silver medal – second place	2015 Poland	Men's 50m Freestyle - S7
Bronze medal – third place	2015 Poland	Men's 100m Backstroke - S7
Bronze medal – third place	2015 Poland	Men's 200m Individual Medley - S7
IWAS World Games
Gold medal – first place	2015 Sochi	Men's 50m Butterfly - S7
Gold medal – first place	2015 Sochi	Men's 200m Individual Medley - S7

Suyash Narayan Jadhav (born 28 November 1993) is an Indian para-swimmer. He is a gold and a double bronze medalist at the Asian Para Games. He has won two gold medals at the World Games and three silver medals at the German Swimming Championships. Jadhav has also won one gold, one silver, and two bronze medals at the Winter Open Polish Championships.

== Career ==
Training at the Deccan Gymkhana in Pune, Jadhav won a silver and a bronze medal at the 2015 IWAS World Games in Sochi, Russia, conducted by the International Wheelchair and Amputee Sports Federation. In doing so, Suyash became the first Indian Para swimmer to register the ‘A’ qualifying mark for the 2016 Paralympics in Rio and Tokyo Olympics 2020.{ Now taking training at Balewadi stadium.

He followed this up with four medals at the 2015 Winter Open Polish Championship in November and won three silver medals at the German swimming championship in 2016.

== Awards ==
Suvarnaratna Awards -2025 Inspiring Sportsman
