= Dharambir Nain =

Indian para athlete

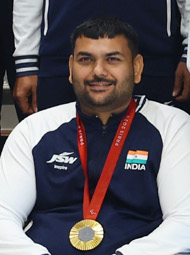
- Nain in 2024

Personal information
- Born: 18 January 1989 (age 37) Rohtak, Haryana, India

Sport
- Sport: Para athletics
- Disability class: F51
- Event: Club throw

Achievements and titles
- Personal best: 34.92 m AR (2024)
Medal record
Men's para-athletics
Representing India
Paralympic Games
Gold medal – first place	2024 Paris	Club throw F51
World Championships
Silver medal – second place	2025 New Delhi	Club throw F51
Bronze medal – third place	2024 Kobe	Club throw F51
Asian Para Games
Silver medal – second place	2018 Jakarta	Club throw F51
Silver medal – second place	2022 Hangzhou	Club throw F51
Bronze medal – third place	2026 Aichi-Nagoya	Club throw F51

Dharambir Nain (born 18 January 1989) is an Indian para club thrower. He represented India at the 2024 Paris Paralympics, where he won the gold medal in the men's club throw F51 event with a throw of 34.92 m, setting a new Asian record.

== Early life ==
Nain was born in Badana village, Rohtak, Haryana. He did his schooling at C. R. Z. Senior Secondary School, Sonipat. He was paralyzed below the waist after a diving accident on 2 June 2012 when he hit the rocks in a canal near his aunt's house. His father died in 2011, and his accident soon after left him shattered. He was bed ridden for over a year and during this period, the visit of Amit Kumar Saroha to his house along with a friend, has changed his life as Saroha introduced him to sports.

== Career ==
Nain took up para athletics in 2014, and was mentored in discus throw by Amit Kumar Saroha. He trains at Sports Authority of India facilities in Sonipat.

Nain represented India at the 2016 Summer Paralympics in Rio de Janeiro, where he finished 9th. He first took part in the London World Championships in 2017. He won a silver medal at the 2018 Asian Para Games.

He represented India at the World Championship in Dubai in 2019 and Paris in 2023. At the 2020 Summer Paralympics at Tokyo, he came 8th in his event.

In 2022, he won two silver medals in club throw and discus throw at the 13th Fazza International Athletics Championships and a silver medal in club throw F51 at the 2022 Asian Para Games in Hangzhou, China. That year he also received the Bhim Award, the highest sports honour presented by the state government of Haryana, India.

He won a bronze medal at the 2024 World Para Athletics Championships in Kobe, Japan.
