= Deepthi Jeevanji =

Indian para athlete

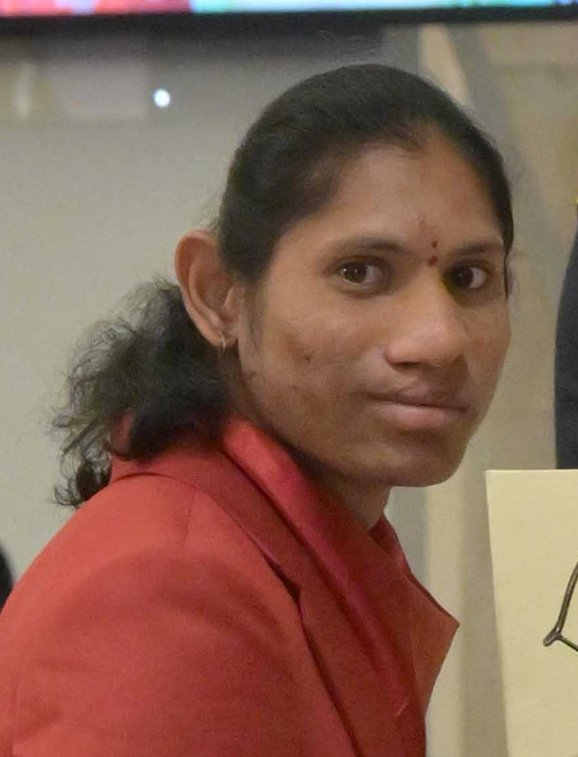
- Jeevanji in 2025

Personal information
- Born: 27 September 2003 (age 22) Kalleda, Warangal, Telangana, India

Sport
- Sport: Para-athletics
- Disability class: T20
Medal record
Women's para-athletics
Representing India
Paralympic Games
Bronze medal – third place	2024 Paris	400m T20
World Championships
Gold medal – first place	2024 Kobe	400m T20
Silver medal – second place	2025 New Delhi	400m T20
Asian Para Games
Gold medal – first place	2022 Hangzhou	400m T20

Deepthi Jeevanji (born 27 September 2003) is an Indian para-athlete. She won the bronze medal at the 2024 Paralympics in the 400 meters T20 race. At the 2024 World Championships, she set a world record of 55.06s. She previously set the Asian Para Games record in 2023. She broke the 55.12s record of Breanna Clark. She is the recipient of Arjuna Award in 2025.

== Early life ==
Jeevanji was born in Kalleda village, Warangal district, Telangana. Her parents, Jeevanji Yadhagiri and Jeevanji Dhanalaxmi, had a half-acre agricultural land, and also used to work at others' farms as daily wage labourers. She was spotted by her school PET teacher in her Class 9 in Warangal. Later, she came under coach Ramesh, the Junior coach of the Indian team. She was also supported by Pullela Gopichand, who suggested that she be tested at the National Institute for the Empowerment of Persons with Intellectual Disability in Hyderabad. There, she was certified under the mentally impaired category, after the relevant tests, and that allowed her to participate as para athlete.

== Career ==
Jeevanji was selected for the Indian team that took part in the 2022 Hangzhou Asian Para Games, where she won the gold medal with a new Asian Para record and the Games record on 24 October 2023 in her pet event, the 400m run in T20 category. She clocked a time of 56.69s to take the gold ahead of Thailand’s Orawan Kaising. Japan's Niina Kanno won the bronze. She was selected to the Indian team that took part at 2024 world Paralympics championships in Kobe, Japan Championships in May in the 100m and 200m (Category F) after two gold in the All-India Inter-University Championships gold at Bhubaneshwar.

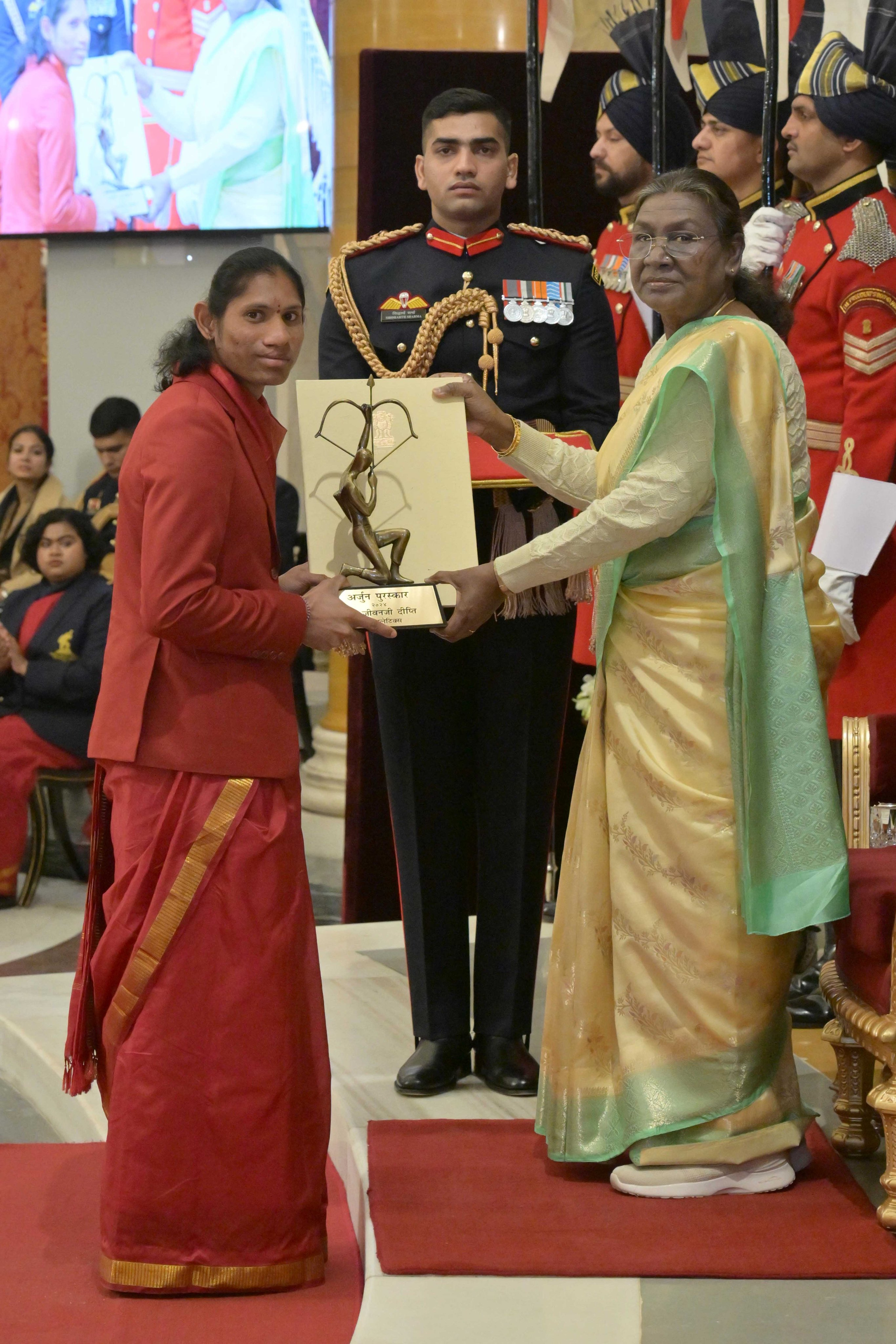
Jeevanji Deepthi Received Arjuna Award, 2024 from President Droupadi Murmu

Earlier, she qualified for the finals setting a new Asian record with a time of 56.18 seconds and secured a Paris 2024 Paralympics quota.with a second place in the 100m (Category F) at the Indian U20 Federation Cup at Chhotu Bhai Purani Sports Complex, Nadiad.
