= Pranav Soorma =

Indian para-athlete (born 1994)

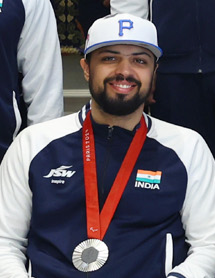
- Soorma in September 2024

Personal information
- Full name: Pranav Soorma
- Born: India

Sport
- Country: India

Achievements and titles
- Paralympic finals: 2024 Paris (silver)
Medal record
Representing India
Men's para-athletics
Paralympic Games
| Silver medal – second place | 2024 Paris | Club throw F51 |
Asian Para Games
| Gold medal – first place | 2022 Hangzhou | Club throw F51 |

Pranav Soorma (born 1994) is an Indian para-athlete. He won the silver medal in the men's club throw F51 event at the 2024 Paris Paralympics. He also won the gold medal at the 2022 Asian Para Games. At the event, he set an Asian Games record with a throw of 30.01 m.

== Early life ==
Soorma hails from Faridabad, Haryana. He did his schooling at St. Paul's School, Delhi. He completed his post-graduation from Delhi School of Economics. He works as a manager (Scale 2) in Bank of Baroda. In 2011 at the age of 16, he met with an accident that injured his spinal cord. His father, Sanjeev, quit his job to support his son to take up sports. Athletes whose movement was affected to a high degree in the trunk, legs and hands are qualified for the F51 club throw event. They rely on their shoulders and arm to generate power and take the throw while seated. Prime Minister Narendra Modi congratulated him for his resilience. He is supported by sports NGO Olympic Gold Quest.

== Career ==
Soorma won the Asian Para Games gold with a record on 23 October 2023. Earlier in 2023, he also won gold in the Serbia Open. In 2022, he bagged silver and gold at the Tunisia Grand Prix. In 2019, he won silver at the Beijing Grand Prix. In the inaugural Khelo India Para games, he improved his Asian record by throwing a distance of 33.54 for his gold medal in December 2023 at the Jawaharlal Nehru Stadium, New Delhi.
