= Amit Kumar Saroha =

Indian Paralympic discus thrower

Amit Kumar
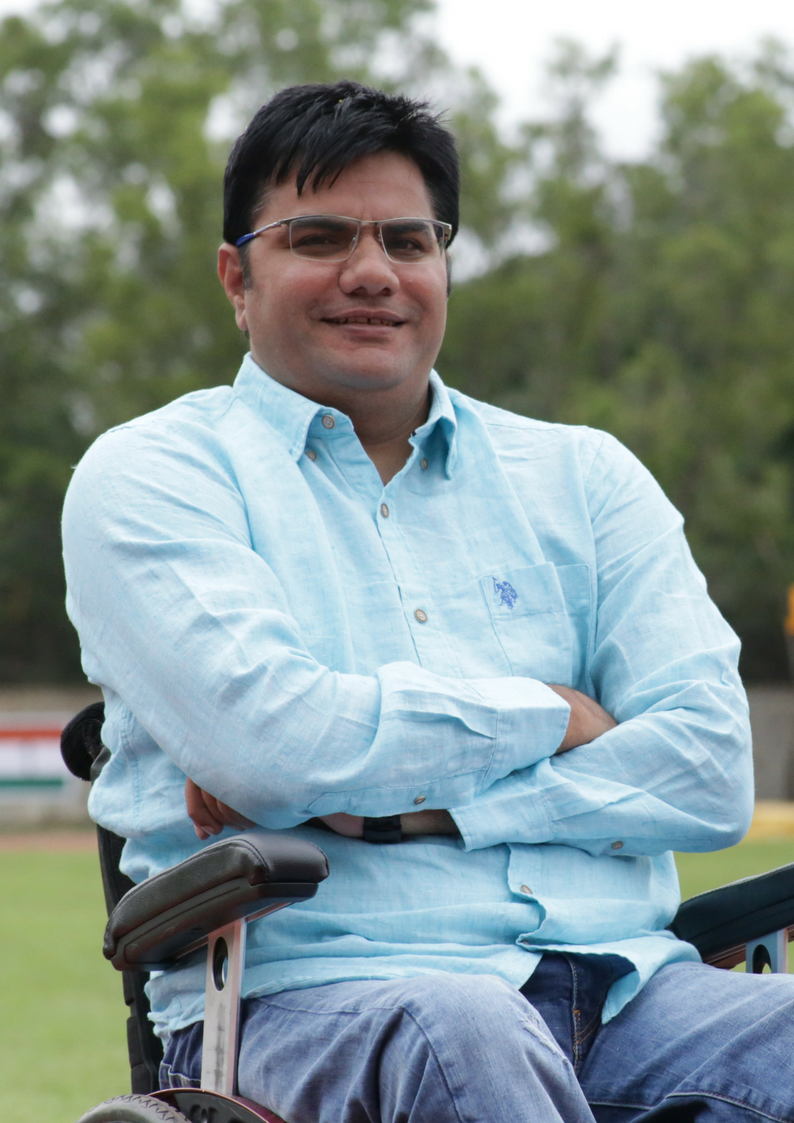

Personal information
- Full name: Amit Kumar Saroha; Amit Kumar Kumar
- Nationality: Indian
- Born: 12 January 1985 (age 41)
- Home town: Sonipat, India

Sport
- Country: India
- Sport: Para Athletics (Discus and Club throw)
- Disability class: F51
Medal record
Paralympic athletics
Representing India
World Championships
Silver medal – second place	2017 London	Club throw F51
Silver medal – second place	2015 Doha	Club throw F51
Asian Para Games
Gold medal – first place	2014 Incheon	Club throw F51
Gold medal – first place	2018 Jakarta	Club throw F51
Silver medal – second place	2014 Incheon	Discus throw F51
Silver medal – second place	2010 Guangzhou	Discus throw F51
Bronze medal – third place	2022 Hangzhou	Club throw F51

Amit Kumar Saroha (born 12 January 1985), also known as Amit Kumar Kumar or simply Amit Kumar, is a Paralympian, Asian Para Games medalist and an Arjuna Awardee, competing in the F51 category in Discus throw and Club throw. He is one of India's top Para athletes and the first quadriplegic to represent India at a Paralympic Games (London 2012). He trains at the Sports Authority of India in Sonipat and is being supported by the GoSports Foundation

== Early life and background ==
Born in Haryana in 1985, Amit had a car accident when he was 22, causing him to become a quadriplegic due to compression of the spinal cord. Before his injury, Amit was a national level hockey player. However, his tryst with fame as a sportsperson happened after his injury when he met Jonathan Sigworth, an American wheelchair rugby player on a tour of India to promote para sports. Wheelchair rugby introduced Amit to the world of para sports and he joined Sigworth in promoting wheelchair rugby across India.

While playing in a demonstration match of wheelchair rugby with a Brazilian team, he met several para-athletes from across the world and learnt the official Paralympic nomenclature for his injury – F 51. Amit decided to take training in sports which require upper body strength and started competing in throw ball and discus throw; he has not looked back since.

== Career ==
In 2010 Amit took part in his first Asian Para Games in Guangzhou, China, where he won a silver medal in Discus throw, one of only 14 other medals won by Indians. Two years later, Amit won a gold medal in the Olympic qualifier event in Kuala Lumpur, Malaysia, breaking the Asian record along the way. This helped Amit rise to third in the world rankings, and also earned him his first Paralympic games qualification (London 2012). The following year, Amit was conferred the Arjuna Award by the President of India, in recognition of his outstanding sporting achievements.

At the 2014 Asian Para Games in Incheon, Korea, Amit won two medals for India; a Gold in Club throw with a distance of 21.31 m and a Silver in Discus throw with a distance of 9.89 m. His club throw distance was another Asian record, and the medal winning performance earned him an automatic qualification for Rio 2016.

Confident from his exploits at the 2014 Asian Para Games, Amit arrived at the 2015 World Championships in Doha, as one of the favorites. He lived up to his reputation, winning silver medal in Club throw and bettering his previous Asian Games mark by over 4 metres to register a throw of 25.44 m. In 2017 World Parathletics Championship, he won Silver Medal setting new Asian record with a throw of 30.25m.

Apart from his athletic career, Amit has also been involved in promoting the Paralympic movement in India. He is a motivational speaker for the youth and has delivered talks across institutions like IIT Guwahati and BITS Pilani, where he served as chief guest.
