= Simran Sharma =

Indian para athlete (born 1999)

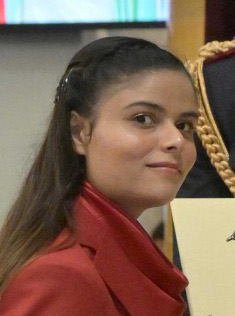
- Sharma in 2025

Personal information
- Born: 9 November 1999 (age 26) Ghaziabad, Uttar Pradesh, India

Sport
- Sport: Para-athletics
- Disability class: T12
- Event: Sprints

Achievements and titles
- Personal bests: 100 m: 11.95 (2025); 200 m: 24.46 AR (2025)
Medal record
Women's para-athletics
Representing India
Paralympic Games
Bronze medal – third place	2024 Paris	200 m T12
World Championships
Gold medal – first place	2024 Kobe	200 m T12
Gold medal – first place	2025 New Delhi	100 m T12
Silver medal – second place	2025 New Delhi	200 m T12
Asian Para Games
Gold medal – first place	2026 Aichi-Nagoya	200 m T12
Gold medal – first place	2026 Aichi-Nagoya	100 m T12
Silver medal – second place	2022 Hangzhou	100 m T12
Silver medal – second place	2022 Hangzhou	200 m T12

Simran Sharma (born 9 November 1999) is an Indian visually-impaired para-athlete. She is a Paralympic medalist, clinching the bronze medal in the women's 200 m T12 event at the 2024 Paris Paralympics. She is also the two-time world champion in the women's T12 track events.

== Early life and education ==
Sharma is from Modinagar, U.P., (NCR Delhi). She was born to Savita Sharma and Manoj Sharma. On 29 November 2017, she married her coach Naik Gajendra Singh. She is posted at New Delhi's 227 company of the Army Service Corps. She was born prematurely after six and half months term and with visual impairment. She was in incubator for six months. Her father Manoj Sharma supported her to take up the sport. She trains at SAI JLN Stadium, New Delhi. She is doing her graduation at Rukmani Modi Mahila Inter College at Modinagar, Ghaziabad.

== Career ==
Sharma took part in China Grand Prix and World Para Grand Prix at Dubai in 2021. She became the first Indian para athlete to qualify for the Tokyo Paralympics in 2021, but she did not get any medal. She was selected to represent the Indian team at the 2022 Asian Para Games at Hangzhou, China where she won two silver medals in the 100m and 200m T12 events. At the Asian Games, she clocked 12.68 seconds for 100m on 24 October 2023 and 26.12 seconds for 200m on 26 October 2023.

In May 2024, she won a gold medal at the World Para Athletics Championships in Kobe, Japan.

== Awards ==
Year	Award	Category	Result	Ref(s)
2024	Arjuna Award	Outstanding performance in Sports and Games 2024	Won	
