= Sandeep Chaudhary =

Indian para-athlete

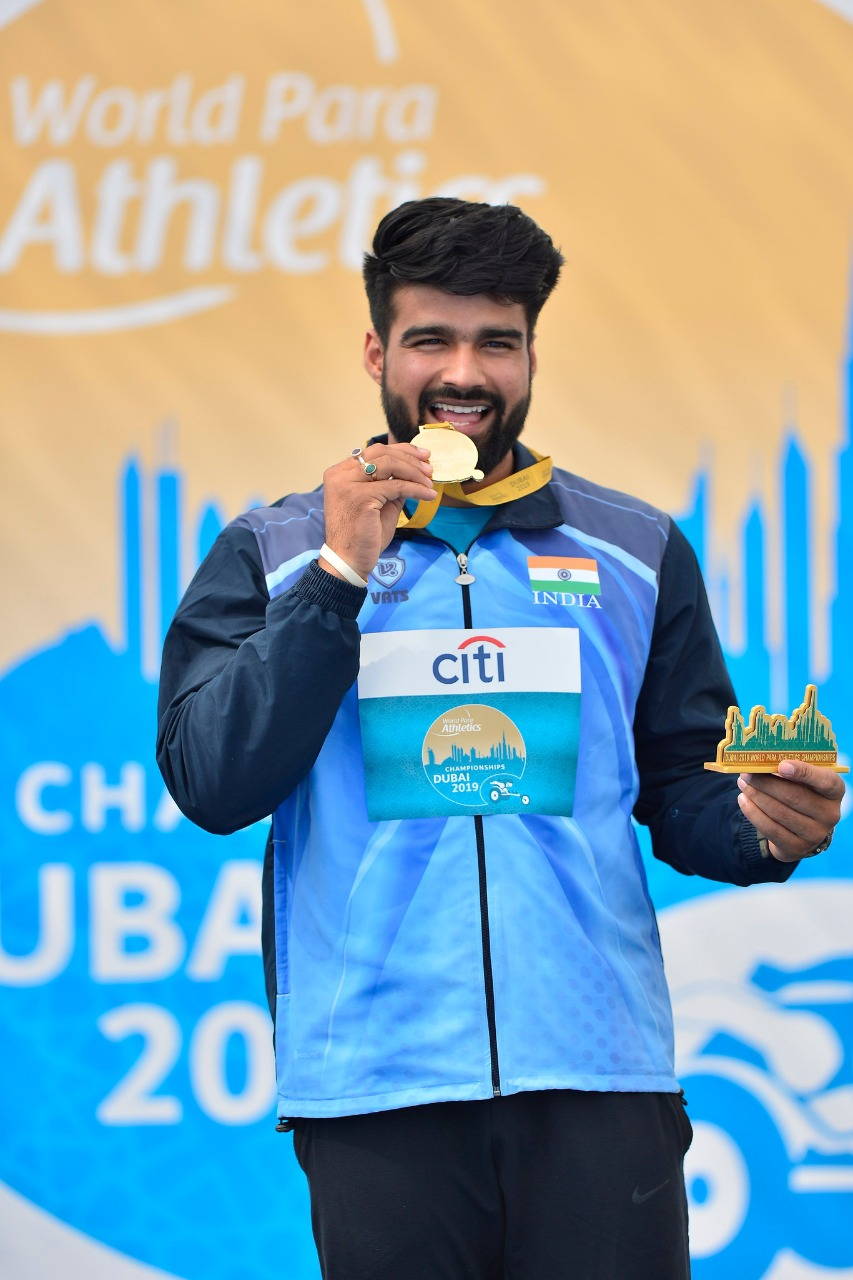
- Chaudhary at the 2019 World Championships

Personal information
- Born: 10 April 1996 (age 30) Khetri, Rajasthan, India

Sport
- Sport: Para-athletics
- Disability class: F44
- Event: Javelin throw
- Coached by: Vipin Kasana
Medal record
Men's para-athletics
Representing India
World Championships
Gold medal – first place	2019 Dubai	Javelin throw F64
Silver medal – second place	2025 New Delhi	Javelin throw F44
Bronze medal – third place	2024 Kobe	Javelin throw F64
Asian Para Games
Gold medal – first place	2018 Jakarta	Javelin throw F44

Sandeep Chaudhary (born 10 April 1996) is an Indian para javelin thrower. He has represented India at the 2016, 2020 and 2024 Paralympics.

== Background ==
Chaudhary is from Khetri, Rajasthan. He is supported by GoSports Foundation under the Para Champions Programme. He is coached by Vipin Kasana.

== Career ==
Chaudhary represented India at the 2018 Asian Para Games in Jakarta, Indonesia where he won a gold medal and set a new world record of 60.01 m (196.9 ft) with his third throw in the F42-44/61-64 category. The previous world record was set in 2008 by Chinese athlete Gao Mingjie.

At World Para Athletics' 2021 Dubai Grand Prix, he won with a gold medal with 61.22 m (200.9 ft). At the 2019 World Para Athletics Championships in Dubai, United Arab Emirates, he won the gold medal with a world record throw of 66.18 m (217.1 ft).
