= Sachin Khilari =

Indian paralympic shot putter

Sachin Sarjerao Khilari
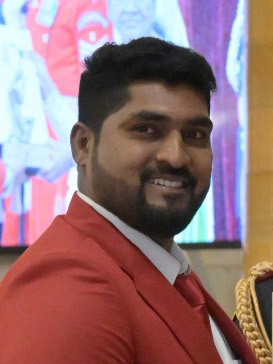
- Khilari in January 2025

Personal information
- Born: 23 October 1989 (age 36) Maharashtra, India

Sport
- Country: India
- Sport: Para-athletics
- Disability class: F46
Medal record
Representing India
Men's Para-athletics
Paralympic Games
Silver medal – second place	2024 Paris	Shot put F46
World Championships
Gold medal – first place	2023 Paris	Shot put F46
Gold medal – first place	2024 Kobe	Shot put F46
Asian Para Games
Gold medal – first place	2022 Hangzhou	Shot put F46

Sachin Sarjerao Khilari is an Indian paralympic shot putter.

== Early life ==
Khilari was born to farmer's family on 23 October 1989, he lost his mother at young age and become clipped at 9 following bicycle accident.

== Career ==
Khilari competed at the 2023 World Para Athletics Championships, winning a gold medal in the men's shot put F46 event. He set a record in shot put with a best throw of 16.21m. He also competed at the 2024 World Para Athletics Championships, winning a gold medal in the same event. in September 2024, he won silver medal at 2024 Summer Paralympics
