= Olympic Gold Quest =

Non-profit company supporting Olympic and Paralympic athletes in India

OGQ
- Abbreviation: OGQ
- Founder: Geet Sethi and Prakash Padukone
- Type: Not for Profit
- Headquarters: Mumbai, Maharashtra
- Location: 401, 5th floor, Anand Building, Dr. Ambedkar Rd, Bandra West, Mumbai, Maharashtra – 400050
- Website: www.ogq.org

OGQ is a program of the Foundation for Promotion of Sports and Games, a non profit (Section 8) company, which sponsors Indian Olympic athletes and Paralympic/ Disabled athletes.

OGQ aims to create a level playing field for Indian athletes to enable them to be competitive at the highest level of sport. Founded by Indian sporting legends Geet Sethi and Prakash Padukone, OGQ's first test was the London 2012 Olympics. 4 out of the 6 Indian medalists were supported by OGQ. In 2010, Leander Paes and Viswanathan Anand also joined the board of directors. Viren Rasquinha, former India hockey captain, is the current MD & CEO of OGQ.

== Objective ==
OGQ aims to assist potential Olympic and Paralympic medal talent from India in achieving their dreams and winning Olympic gold medals. It does so by scouting for potential medal talent, helping to identify areas of support, and working with stakeholders to aid deserving talent.

OGQ strives to complement the efforts of the Indian Government and various sports federations in identifying and funding the best and most deserving medal prospects for the Olympic and Paralympic Games.

== Supported athletes ==
OGQ currently supports around 400 athletes across 10 Olympic and 8 Paralympic sports. This count includes around 150 Junior Athletes supported as a part of the OGQ Junior Program and 101 Para Athletes supported as a part of the OGQ Para Program.

== Olympic Medals won by OGQ Supported Athletes ==
Medal	Name/Team	Games	Sport	Event
Silver	Vijay Kumar	2012 London	Shooting	Men's 25 Rapid Fire Pistol
Bronze	Gagan Narang	2012 London	Shooting	Men's 10m Air Rifle
Bronze	Saina Nehwal	2012 London	Badminton	Women's singles
Bronze	Mary Kom	2012 London	Boxing	Women's flyweight
Silver	P. V. Sindhu	2016 Rio de Janeiro	Badminton	Women's singles
Silver	Mirabai Chanu	2020 Tokyo	Weightlifting	Women's 49kgs
Silver	Ravi Kumar Dahiya	2020 Tokyo	Wrestling	Men's 57 kgs
Bronze	P. V. Sindhu	2020 Tokyo	Badminton	Women's singles
Bronze	Lovlina Borgohain	2020 Tokyo	Boxing	Women's welterweight
Gold	Kumar Nitesh	2024 Paris	Badminton	Men's singles SL3
