= List of high jump Paralympic medalists =

The high jump was first contested in the 1976 Summer Paralympics for men and women. However, the women's high jump is now discontinued with the last event being held in the 2000 Summer Paralympics.

== Men's medal summaries ==
=== Amputee athletes ===
Class	Year	Gold	Silver	Bronze
A	1976	John Bowman; United States	Doug Rupe; Australia	T. Lewis; United States
A	1980	Ernie Lambier; Canada	Robert Wright; United States	John Bowman; United States
A (two foot take off)	1976	C. Gillfors; Sweden	Martti Juntunen; Finland	Jarle Johnsen; Norway
A2	1984	Arnold Boldt; Canada	Bert Bottemanne; Netherlands; Anthony Willis; Great Britain	No bronze medalist; tie for silver
A2/A9	1988	Arnold Boldt; Canada	Andreas Siegl; Austria	Gunther Beltiz; West Germany
A3	1984	Ngwe Tin; Burma	Ronan Tynan; Ireland; Gyi Aung; Burma	No bronze medalist; tie for silver
A4	1984	Ronnie Alsup; United States	James Hoggan; Australia; Kazimierz Suchocki; Poland	No bronze medalist; tie for silver
A4/A9	1988	Ronnie Alsup; United States	Michael Hackett; Australia	Jurgen Johann; West Germany
A5	1984	Matthias Berg; West Germany	Jerzy Szlezak; Poland; Jeff Tiessen; Canada; Ronald West; Great Britain	No bronze medalist; tie for silver
A6	1984	Michael Morley; Australia	Brett Holcombe; Australia; Peter Lorencz; Hungary	No bronze medalist; tie for silver
A6/A8-9/L6	1988	Nigel Coultas; Great Britain	Yang Shaomin; China	Rodney Nugent; Australia
C	1976	Jurgen Johann; West Germany	Roni Fradkin; Israel	Wong Shek Kau; Hong Kong
C	1980	Jurgen Johann; West Germany	Tony Wills; Canada; D. J. Eden; New Zealand	No bronze medalist
D	1976	Arnold Boldt; Canada	Konrad Reisner; Austria	W. Hilzinger; West Germany
D	1980	Arnold Boldt; Canada	Anthony Willis; Great Britain	Norbert Kolodzie; West Germany
E	1976	A. Broeckhuysen; Netherlands	Only one competitor	
E	1980	Jan Krauz; Poland	Walter Kessler; Switzerland	Andres Garcia; Spain
F	1976	Nitzan Atzmon; Israel	Heikki Miettinen; Finland	Gerhard Kolm; Austria
F	1980	Gerhard Kolm; Austria	S. Ishii; Japan	Nitzan Atzmon; Israel
J1	1992	Arnold Boldt; Canada	Hans Santschi; Switzerland	Andreas Siegl; Austria
J2	1992	Zhao Ti; China	Alessandro Kuris; Italy	Michael Hackett; Australia
J4	1992	Zhao Xue; China	Shao Yang; China	Dana Jaster; United States
F42	2000	Hou Bin; China	Guo Wei Zhong; China	Gunther Belitz; Germany
F42	2004	Hou Bin; China	Guo Wei Zhong; China	Dennis Wliszczak; Austria
F42	2012	Iliesa Delana; Fiji	Girisha Nagarajegowda; India	Lukasz Mamczarz; Poland
F42-44	1996	Hou Bin; China	Alan Earle; Great Britain	Juergen Kern; Germany
F44/46	2004	Wu Yancong; China	Jeff Skiba; United States	Qui Hong Wang; China
F44/46	2008	Jeff Skiba; United States	Aaron Chatman; Australia	Chen Hongjie; China
F46	2000	Wu Yancong; China	Marlon Shirley; United States	David Roos; South Africa
F46	2012	Maciej Lepiato; Poland	Jeff Skiba; United States	Chen Hongjie; China
T42	2016	Mariyappan Thangavelu; India	Sam Grewe; United States	Bhati Varun Singh; India
T44	2016	Maciej Lepiato; Poland	Jonathan Broom-Edwards; Great Britain	Rafael Uribe; Venezuela
T47	2016	Roderick Townsend-Roberts; United States	Chen Hongjie; China	Aaron Chatman; Australia
T47	2020	Roderick Townsend-Roberts; United States	Nishad Kumar; India; Dallas Wise; United States	No bronze medalist; tie for silver
T63	2020	Sam Grewe; United States	Mariyappan Thangavelu; India	Sharad Kumar; India
T64	2020	Jonathan Broom-Edwards; Great Britain	Praveen Kumar; India	Maciej Lepiato; Poland

=== Blind athletes ===
Class	Year	Gold	Silver	Bronze
B	1976	August Hofer; Austria	Richard Barnhart; United States	Martin Sallaert; Belgium
B	1980	Hiromasa Matsui; Japan	August Hofer; Austria	W. Knorrs; West Germany
B1	1984	Italo Sacchetto; Italy	Stefan Bidzinski; Poland	Beat Camenzind; Switzerland
B1	1988	Italo Sacchetto; Italy	Hadi Abdulaziz; Indonesia	Yukio Minami; Japan
B2	1984	Stephane Saas; France	Rudy de Meersman; Belgium	Norbert Antlitz; West Germany
B2	1988	Vadim Kalmykov; Soviet Union	Norbert Antlitz; West Germany	Masanobi Horiuchi; Japan
B2	1992	Alejo Velez; Spain	Juan Carlos Prieto; Spain	Mohamad Khasseri Othman; Malaysia; Akihito Motohashi; Japan
B3	1984	Yosef Olah; Hungary	Claudio Foresti; Italy	George Morris; United States; Warren Lawton; Australia
B3	1988	Oleg Chepel; Soviet Union	Hiroaki Nakamura; Japan	Danny de Meersman; Belgium
B3	1992	Jonathan Orcutt; United States	Enest Bliey; United States	Olaf Mehlmann; Germany
F10-11	1996	Oleg Chepel; Belarus	Alejo Velez; Spain	Shigeo Yoshihara; Japan
F12	2000	Ruslan Sivitski; Belarus	Leszek Reut; Poland	Oleg Chepel; Belarus

=== Intellectually impaired athletes ===
Class	Year	Gold	Silver	Bronze
F20	2000	Wissam Ben Bahri; Tunisia	Parashos Stogiannidis; Greece	Hein Seyerling; South Africa

== Women's medal summaries ==
Class	Year	Gold	Silver	Bronze
A	1976	B. Stanger; Canada	Only one competitor	
A	1980	Joke van Rijswijk; Netherlands	Ilse Bohning; West Germany	Cheryl Hurd; Canada
Class A6	1984	Petra Buddelmeyer; West Germany	Julie Holley; United States	No bronze medalist
B	1976	G. Bloomfield; Canada	Only one competitor	
B	1980	Janet Rowley; United States	Lynelle Brantner; United States	Anna Ostapa; Canada
B1	1984	Catherine Welsby; Great Britain	Vera Kroes; Netherlands	Joke van Rijswijk; Netherlands
B2	1984	Janet Rowley; United States	Margaret Murphy; Australia	No bronze medalist
B3	1984	Melba Houghton; United States	Zhao Jihong; China	No bronze medalist
C	1980	Charmaine Cree; Australia	Only one competitor	
D	1980	Sue Grimstead; Canada	Only one competitor	
F20	2000	Lisa Llorens; Australia	Kazumi Sakai; Japan	Sirly Tiik; Estonia

== See also ==
- Athletics at the Olympics
- High jump at the Olympics
