= Athletics at the 2024 Summer Paralympics – Men's high jump =

Event at the 2024 Summer Paralympics

Athletics – Men's high jump at the XVII Paralympic Games
- Venue: Stade de France
- Dates: 1–6 September 2024
- No. of events: 3
- Competitors: 25

The Men's high jump athletics events for the 2024 Summer Paralympics took place at the Stade de France stadium, Saint-Denis, Paris from 1 to 6 September 2024. A total of 3 events were contested in this discipline.

== Schedule ==
| R | Round 1 | ½ | Semifinals | F | Final |

| Date | Sun 1 | | Mon 2 | | Tue 3 | | Wed 4 | | Thu 5 | | Fri 6 | |
| Event | M | E | M | E | M | E | M | E | M | E | M | E |
|---|---|---|---|---|---|---|---|---|---|---|---|---|
| T47 | | F | | | | | | | | | | |
| T63 | | | | | | F | | | | | | |
| T64 | | | | | | | | | | | F | |

== Medal summary ==
The following is a summary of the medals awarded across all high jump events.

| Classification | Gold | | Silver | | Bronze | |
|---|---|---|---|---|---|---|
| T47 | Roderick Townsend; United States | 2.12 | Nishad Kumar; India | 2.04 | Georgii Margiev; Neutral Paralympic Athletes | 2.00 |
| T63 | Ezra Frech; United States | 1.94 | Sharad Kumar; India | 1.88 | Mariyappan Thangavelu; India | 1.85 |
| T64 | Praveen Kumar; India | 2.08 | Derek Loccident; United States | 2.06 | Temurbek Giyazov; Uzbekistan | 2.03 |

== Results ==
=== T47 ===
The T47 category is for athletes who have a single below elbow or wrist amputation or similar disability, with normal function in both legs.

T46 athletes were also eligible in this class.

The T46 category is for athletes who have a single above or below elbow amputation or similar disability, with normal function in both legs.

Records

Prior to this competition, the existing world, Paralympic, and area records were as follows:

| World Record | Roderick Townsend (USA) | 2.16 | (France) Paris | 11 July 2023 |
| Paralympic Record | Roderick Townsend (USA) | 2.15 | (Japan) Tokyo | 29 August 2021 |

Results

The final in this classification took place on 1 September 2024.

| Rank | Athlete | Nation | 1.70 | 1.75 | 1.80 | 1.84 | 1.88 | 1.92 | 1.95 | 1.98 | 2.00 | 2.02 | 2.04 | 2.06 | 2.08 | 2.12 | 2.17 | Best | Notes |
|---|---|---|---|---|---|---|---|---|---|---|---|---|---|---|---|---|---|---|---|
| 1st place, gold medalist(s) | Roderick Townsend | United States | - | - | - | - | - | - | - | o | - | o | - | o | xo | o | xxx | 2.12 | |
| 2nd place, silver medalist(s) | Nishad Kumar | India | - | - | - | - | - | - | o | - | o | - | o | - | xxx | | | 2.04 | |
| 3rd place, bronze medalist(s) | Georgii Margiev | Neutral Paralympic Athletes | - | - | o | o | o | o | xo | o | xo | xxx | | | | | | 2.00 | AR |
| 4 | Abdullah Ilgaz | Turkey | - | - | o | o | o | o | o | o | xxx | | | | | | | 1.98 | PB |
| 5 | Khumo Neo Pitso | South Africa | - | - | - | o | - | xo | xo | xxo | - | xxx | | | | | | 1.98 | AR |
| 6 | Yalong Zhao | China | - | - | o | - | o | - | o | x- | xx | | | | | | | 1.95 | PB |
| 7 | Pal Ram | India | - | - | - | o | o | xxo | xxo | xxx | | | | | | | | 1.95 | =PB |
| 8 | A. Dipoko-Ewane | France | - | - | xo | o | o | o | xxx | | | | | | | | | 1.92 | =SB |
| 9 | Hongjie Chen | China | - | - | o | - | o | xxx | | | | | | | | | | 1.88 | SB |
| 10 | Séverin Ayao Kansa^{(fr) Cont'd} | Togo | o | o | xo | xxo | xo | xxx | | | | | | | | | | 1.88 | PB |
| 11 | Isaiah Benjamin ^{Cont'd} | Virgin Islands | xo | xxx | | | | | | | | | | | | | | 1.70 | PB |

The following athletes entered before the 1.70 metre height.

| Rank | Athlete | Nation | 1.40 | 1.45 | 1.50 | 1.55 | 1.60 | 1.65 | 1.70 | 1.75 | 1.80 | 1.84 | 1.88 | 1.92 | 1.95 | 1.98 | 2.00 | Best | Notes |
|---|---|---|---|---|---|---|---|---|---|---|---|---|---|---|---|---|---|---|---|
| 10 | Séverin Ayao Kansa^{(fr)} | Togo | | | - | - | - | o | o | o | xo | xxo | xo | xxx | | | | 1.88 | PB |
| 11 | Isaiah Benjamin | Virgin Islands | | | o | o | o | o | xo | xxx | | | | | | | | 1.70 | PB |

=== T63/42 ===
This event was also open to T42 athletes.

The T42 category is for single above-knee amputees and athletes with other impairments that are comparable to a single above knee amputation, including athletes with loss of muscle power in the lower limbs.

Records

Prior to this competition, the existing world, Paralympic and area records were as follows:

T42 Records
| World Record | Arnold Boldt | Canada | 1.96 | Arnhem (Netherlands) | 17 Jun 1980 |
| Paralympic Record | Mariyappan Thangavelu | India | 1.86 | Tokyo (Japan) | 31 Aug 2021 |
T63 Records
| World Record | Ezra Frech | United States | 1.97 | Miramar (United States) | 20 Jul 2024 |
| Paralympic Record | Sam Grewe | United States | 1.88 | Tokyo (Japan) | 31 Aug 2021 |

Results

The final in this classification took place on 3 September 2024, at 19:25.

| Rank | Athlete | Nation | Class | 1.67 | 1.72 | 1.77 | 1.81 | 1.85 | 1.88 | 1.91 | 1.94 | 1.98 | Best | Notes |
|---|---|---|---|---|---|---|---|---|---|---|---|---|---|---|
| 1st place, gold medalist(s) | Ezra Frech | United States | T63 | - | o | o | xo | o | o | o | - | xxx | 1.94 | PR |
| 2nd place, silver medalist(s) | Sharad Kumar | India | T42 | - | - | o | o | xo | xo | x- | xx | | 1.88 | PR, SB |
| 3rd place, bronze medalist(s) | Mariyappan Thangavelu | India | T42 | - | - | o | o | o | xxx | | | | 1.85 | |
| 4 | Shailesh Kumar | India | T42 | - | o | o | o | xo | xxx | | | | 1.85 | =PB |
| 5 | Wagner Astacio | Dominican Republic | T42 | - | o | o | xo | xo | xxx | | | | 1.85 | SB |
| 6 | Yves Noe Batifi Loumou | Cameroon | T42 | o | o | o | xxx | | | | | | 1.77 | AR |
| 7 | Lukasz Mamczarz | Poland | T42 | o | xo | o | xxx | | | | | | 1.77 | |
| 8 | Sam Grewe | United States | T63 | o | o | xxx | | | | | | | 1.72 | |

=== T64/44 ===
The T44 category is for athletes who have a single below knee amputation or who can walk with moderately reduced function in one or both legs.

Records

Prior to this competition, the existing world, Paralympic, and area records were as follows:

T44 Records
| World Record | Maciej Lepiato (POL) | 2.19 | (Brazil) Rio de Janeiro |
| Paralympics Record | Maciej Lepiato (POL) | 2.19 | (Brazil) Rio de Janeiro |
T64 Records
| World Record | Jeff Skiba (USA) | 2.11 | (China) Beijing |
| Paralympics Record | Toru Suzuki (JPN) | 1.88 | (Japan) Tokyo |

Results

The final in this classification took place on 6 September 2024, at 11:02.

| Rank | Athlete | Nation | Class | 1.80 | 1.85 | 1.89 | 1.89 | 1.97 | 2.00 | 2.03 | 2.06 | 2.08 | 2.10 | Best | Notes |
|---|---|---|---|---|---|---|---|---|---|---|---|---|---|---|---|
| 1st place, gold medalist(s) | Praveen Kumar | India | T44 | - | - | o | o | o | o | o | o | o | xxx | 2.08 | AR |
| 2nd place, silver medalist(s) | Derek Loccident | United States | T64 | - | o | xo | o | o | x- | x- | o | x- | xx | 2.06 | PR, PB |
| 3rd place, bronze medalist(s) | Temurbek Giyazov | Uzbekistan | T44 | o | o | - | o | o | o | xo | xxx | | | 2.03 | PB |
| 4 | Maciej Lepiato | Poland | T44 | - | - | o | - | o | o | xo | xxx | | | 2.03 | |
| 5 | Jonathan Broom-Edwards | Great Britain | T44 | o | - | o | - | xx | x | | | | | 1.89 | |
| 6 | Abraham Amon | Nigeria | T44 | xo | o | xxx | | | | | | | | 1.85 | |
