= Athletics at the 2020 Summer Paralympics – Men's high jump =

The Men's high jump athletics events for the 2020 Summer Paralympics took place at the Tokyo National Stadium from August 29 to September 3, 2021. A total of 3 events were contested in this discipline.

== Schedule ==
R	Round 1	½	Semifinals	F	Final

Date	Sun 29		Mon 30		Tue 31		Wed 1		Thu 2		Fri 3	
Event	M	E	M	E	M	E	M	E	M	E	M	E
T47		F										
T63						F						
T64											F	

== Medal summary ==
The following is a summary of the medals awarded across all high jump events.

Classification	Gold		Silver		Bronze	
T47	Roderick Townsend-Roberts; United States	2.15 WR	Nishad Kumar; India	2.06 =AR	shared silver	
T47	Roderick Townsend-Roberts; United States	2.15 WR	Dallas Wise; United States	2.06	shared silver	
T63	Sam Grewe; United States	1.88	Mariyappan Thangavelu; India	1.86	Sharad Kumar; India	1.83
T64	Jonathan Broom-Edwards; Great Britain	2.10	Praveen Kumar; India	2.07 AR	Maciej Lepiato; Poland	2.04

== Results ==
=== T47 ===
The T47 category is for athletes who have a single below elbow or wrist amputation or similar disability, with normal function in both legs.

Records

Prior to this competition, the existing world, Paralympic, and area records were as follows:

World record	Roderick Townsend-Roberts (USA)	2.14	Torrance, California	20 April 2019
Paralympic record	Roderick Townsend-Roberts (USA)	2.09	Rio de Janeiro, Brazil	16 September 2016

Area	Height (m)	Athlete	Nation
Africa	1.92	David Roos	South Africa
America	2.14	Roderick Townsend-Roberts	United States
Asia	2.06	Nishad Kumar	India
Europe	1.97	Reinhold Bötzel	Germany
Oceania	2.05	Aaron Chatman	Australia

Results

The final in this classification took place on 29 August 2021:

Rank	Athlete	Nationality	1.74	1.79	1.84	1.89	1.94	1.98	2.02	2.06	2.09	2.12	2.15	2.18	Best	Notes
1st place, gold medalist(s)	Roderick Townsend-Roberts	United States	—	—	—	—	—	—	o	o	o	o	o	xxx	2.15	WR
2nd place, silver medalist(s)	Dallas Wise	United States	—	—	—	—	—	—	xo	xo	xxx				2.06	
2nd place, silver medalist(s)	Nishad Kumar	India	—	—	—	o	o	xo	o	xo	xxx				2.06	=AR
4	Chen Hongjie	China	o	—	o	o	o	xxo	xxx						1.98	SB
5	Ram Pal	India	—	—	o	o	xo	xxx							1.94	=PB
6	Georgii Margiev	RPC	o	o	o	o	xxx								1.89	
7	Angkarn Chanaboon	Thailand	—	—	xo	o	xxx								1.89	
8	Paulo Guerra	Brazil	—	o	o	xxx									1.84	
9	Jordan Lee	Ireland	o	xxx											1.74	

=== T63 ===
Records Prior to this competition, the existing world, Paralympic and area records were as follows:

World record	Sam Grewe (USA)	1.90	Lima, Peru	25 August 2019
Paralympic record	Sam Grewe (USA)	1.88	Tokyo, Japan	

Area	Height (m)	Athlete	Nation
Africa	1.69	Hamada Hassan	Egypt
America	1.90	Sam Grewe	United States
Asia	1.86	Mariyappan Thangavelu	India
Europe	1.82	Łukasz Mamczarz	Poland
Oceania	Vacant		

Results

The final in this classification took place on 31 August 2021, at 19:25:

Rank	Athlete	Nationality	1.45	1.50	1.55	1.60	1.65	1.69	1.73	1.77	1.80	1.83	1.86	1.88	1.91	Best	Notes
1st place, gold medalist(s)	Sam Grewe	United States	—	—	—	—	—	—	xo	o	o	o	xxo	xxo	xxx	1.88	
2nd place, silver medalist(s)	Mariyappan Thangavelu	India	—	—	—	—	—	—	o	o	o	o	xxo	xxx		1.86	SB
3rd place, bronze medalist(s)	Sharad Kumar	India	—	—	—	—	—	—	o	o	o	o	xxx			1.83	SB
4	Łukasz Mamczarz	Poland	—	—	—	—	—	o	o	o	o	xxx				1.80	SB
5	Ezra Frech	United States	—	—	—	—	—	o	o	o	xo	xxx				1.80	=PB
6	Flávio Reitz	Brazil	—	—	—	o	o	o	o	o	xxx					1.77	SB
7	Varun Singh Bhati	India	—	—	—	—	—	o	xxo	o	xxx					1.77	SB
8	Hamada Hassan	Egypt	—	—	—	o	o	o	xxx							1.69	
9	Yusif Amadu	Ghana	o	o	xr											1.50	SB

=== T64 ===
Records

Prior to this competition, the existing world, Paralympic, and area records were as follows:

World record	Jeff Skiba (USA)	2.11	Beijing, China	14 September 2008
Paralympic record	Vacant	–		

Area	Height (m)	Athlete	Nation
Africa	Vacant		
American	2.11	Jeff Skiba	United States
Asia	2.07	Praveen Kumar	India
Europe	1.87	Tarık Taha Buyrukoğlu	Turkey
Oceania	Vacant		

Results

The final in this classification took place on 3 September 2021, at 11:02:

Rank	Athlete	Nationality	1.83	1.88	1.93	1.97	2.01	2.04	2.07	2.10	2.13	Best	Notes
1st place, gold medalist(s)	Jonathan Broom-Edwards	Great Britain	—	—	o	o	o	xo	xxo	xo	r	2.10	SB
2nd place, silver medalist(s)	Praveen Kumar	India	—	o	—	o	xo	o	xo	xxx		2.07	AR
3rd place, bronze medalist(s)	Maciej Lepiato	Poland	—	o	—	o	xo	o	xxx			2.04	
4	Jeohsah Bezerra	Brazil	o	xo	xxx							1.88	SB
5	Toru Suzuki	Japan	o	xo	xxx							1.88	SB
6	Temurbek Giyazov	Uzbekistan	xo	xo	xxx							1.88	
	Rafael Augusto Uribe Pimentel	Venezuela	xxr									NM	
