= 2019 World Para Athletics Championships – Men's high jump =

The men's high jump event at the 2019 World Para Athletics Championships was held in Dubai on 11 November (T64), 13 November (T47) and 14 November (T63).

== Medalists ==
Event	Gold		Silver		Bronze	
T47	Roderick Townsend-Roberts; United States	2.03	Chen Hongjie; China	2.00	Nishad Kumar; India	2.00
T63	Sam Grewe; United States	1.86	Sharad Kumar; India	1.83	Mariyappan Thangavelu; India	1.80
T64	Jonathan Broom-Edwards; United Kingdom	2.02	Temurbek Giyazov; Uzbekistan	1.99	Toru Suzuki; Japan	1.92
WR world record | AR area record | CR championship record | GR games record | NR national record | OR Olympic record | PB personal best | SB season best | WL world leading (in a given season)

Events listed in pink were contested but no medals were awarded.

== Detailed results ==
=== T47 ===
The event was held on 13 November.

Rank	Name	Nationality	Result
1st place, gold medalist(s)	Roderick Townsend-Roberts	United States	2.03
2nd place, silver medalist(s)	Chen Hongjie	China	2.00
3rd place, bronze medalist(s)	Nishad Kumar	India	2.00
	Georgii Margiev	Russia	1.91
	Aaron Chatman	Australia	1.87
	Jordan Lee	Ireland	1.87
	Angkarn Chanaboon	Thailand	1.87
	Abdullah Ilgaz	Turkey	1.83
	Daniel Perez Martinez	Spain	1.83
	Alexandre Dipoko-Ewane	France	1.83
	Gokhan Akin	Turkey	1.60
	Mathieu Moulart	Belgium	1.60

=== T63 ===
The event was held on 14 November.

Rank	Name	Nationality	Result
1st place, gold medalist(s)	Sam Grewe	United States	1.86
2nd place, silver medalist(s)	Sharad Kumar	India	1.83
3rd place, bronze medalist(s)	Mariyappan Thangavelu	India	1.80
	Łukasz Mamczarz	Poland	1.80
	Ramsingbhai Govindbhai Padhiyar	India	1.77
	Hamada Hassan	Egypt	1.74
	Ezra Frech	United States	1.74
	Buddika Indrapala	Sri Lanka	1.59
	Obed Lekhehle	South Africa	1.55

=== T64 ===
The event was held on 11 November.

Rank	Name	Nationality	Result
1st place, gold medalist(s)	Jonathan Broom-Edwards	United Kingdom	2.02
2nd place, silver medalist(s)	Temurbek Giyazov	Uzbekistan	1.99
3rd place, bronze medalist(s)	Toru Suzuki	Japan	1.92
	Praveen Kumar	India	1.92
	Rafael Augusto Uribe Pimentel	Venezuela	1.88
	Gurimu Narita	Japan	1.84
	Tarik Taha Buyrukoglu	Turkey	1.84
	Amila Warnakulasooriya	Sri Lanka	1.55
	Mahir Ates	Turkey	1.50

== See also ==
- List of IPC world records in athletics
