= Athletics at the 2016 Summer Paralympics – Men's high jump =

The Men's high jump athletics events for the 2016 Summer Paralympics took place at the Rio Olympic Stadium from September 8 to September 17, 2016. A total of three events were contested for three different classifications.

== Schedule ==
Event↓/Date →	Thu 8	Fri 9	Sat 10	Sun 11	Mon 12	Tue 13	Wed 14	Thu 15	Fri 16	Sat 17
F42 High Jump		F								
F44 High Jump					F					
F47 High Jump									F	

== Medal summary ==
Classification	Gold		Silver		Bronze	
T42	Mariyappan Thangavelu; India	1.89 RR	Sam Grewe; United States	1.86 PB	Varun Singh Bhati; India	1.86 PB
T44	Maciej Lepiato; Poland	2.19 WR	Jonathan Broom-Edwards; Great Britain	2.10 =SB	Rafael Uribe; Venezuela	2.01 PB
T47	Roderick Townsend-Roberts; United States	2.09 PB	Chen Hongjie; China	1.99 SB	Aaron Chatman (T46); Australia	1.99 PB

== Results ==
=== T42 ===
Rank	Name	Nationality	1.45	1.50	1.55	1.60	1.65	1.68	1.71	1.74	1.77	1.80	1.83	1.86	1.89	1.92	Result	Note
1st place, gold medalist(s)	Mariyappan Thangavelu	India	–	–	–	o	o	o	o	o	xo	o	o	xo	xo	xxx	1.89	RR
2nd place, silver medalist(s)	Sam Grewe	United States	–	–	–	–	–	o	o	xo	o	xo	xo	o	xxx		1.86	PB
3rd place, bronze medalist(s)	Varun Singh Bhati	India	–	–	–	–	o	o	o	o	o	xo	o	xxo	xxx		1.86	PB
4	Lukasz Mamczarz	Poland	–	–	–	o	o	o	o	o	xo	xx–	x				1.77	SB
4	Zhong Zhiqiang	China	–	–	–	–	o	o	o	o	xo	xxx					1.77	PB
6	Sharad Kumar	India	–	–	o	o	o	–	o	–	xxo	–	xxx				1.77	
7	Hamada Hassan	Egypt	–	–	–	–	o	o	o	o	xxx						1.74	SB
7	Jeroen Teeuwen	Netherlands	–	–	–	o	o	o	o	o	xxx						1.74	PB
9	Jonathan Avellaneda	Argentina	–	–	–	–	o	–	o	xxx							1.71	PB
9	Flavio Reitz	Brazil	–	–	–	–	o	–	o	–	xxx						1.71	
11	Yusif Amadu	Ghana	–	o	xo	xo	o	o	xxx								1.68	PB
12	Leon Schäfer	Germany	–	–	o	xxx											1.55	

=== T44 ===
Rank	Name	Nationality	1.65	1.70	1.75	1.80	1.85	1.90	1.95	1.98	2.01	2.04	2.07	2.10	2.13	2.19	2.30	Result	Note
1st place, gold medalist(s)	Maciej Lepiato	Poland	–	–	–	–	–	–	o	–	–	o	–	o	o	xo	xxr	2.19	WR
2nd place, silver medalist(s)	Jonathan Broom-Edwards	Great Britain	–	–	–	–	–	o	–	o	–	o	xo	xo	xxx			2.10	SB
3rd place, bronze medalist(s)	Rafael Uribe	Venezuela	–	–	–	o	x–	xo	xo	o	o	xxx						2.01	PB
4	Toru Suzuki	Japan	–	–	–	–	o	o	xo	xxx								1.95	
5	Jeff Skiba	United States	–	–	–	–	o	xo	xxo	xxx								1.95	
6	Jeohsah Beserra dos Santos	Brazil	o	o	o	o	xxo	xxx										1.85	PB

=== T47 ===
Rank	Name	Nationality	Class	1.60	1.65	1.70	1.75	1.80	1.85	1.90	1.93	1.96	1.99	2.02	2.05	2.09	2.13	Result	Note
1st place, gold medalist(s)	Roderick Townsend-Roberts	United States	T46	–	–	–	–	–	–	–	–	–	o	o	o	o	xxx	2.09	PR
2nd place, silver medalist(s)	Chen Hongjie	China	T46	–	–	–	–	o	o	o	o	x–	o	xxx				1.99	SB
3rd place, bronze medalist(s)	Aaron Chatman	Australia	T47	–	–	–	–	–	o	o	o	o	xxo	xxx				1.99	PB
4	Angkarn Chanaboon	Thailand	T47	–	–	–	o	o	o	o	o	o	xxx					1.96	
5	Zhou Wu	China	T47	–	–	–	o	o	o	xxo	o	xxx						1.93	PB
6	Rampal Chahar	India	T47	–	–	–	o	o	o	xo	xxo	xxx						1.93	PB
7	Lo Andris González	Venezuela	T46	–	–	–	–	xxo	o	xx–	x							1.85	
8	Zhao Yalong	China	T47	–	–	–	o	o	xxx									1.80	
9	Reinhold Bötzel	Germany	T46	–	–	o	o	xxo	xxx									1.80	=SB
10	Florin Cojoc	Romania	T47	–	o	o	o	xxx										1.75	
11	Epeli Baleibau	Fiji	T47	–	–	xo	xxx											1.70	
