= 2023 World Para Athletics Championships – Men's high jump =

The men's high jump events at the 2023 World Para Athletics Championships were held at Charlety Stadium, Paris, France, from 10 to 13 July.

== Medalists ==
Event	Gold	Silver	Bronze
T47	Roderick Townsend; United States	Nishad Kumar; India	Dallas Wise; United States
T63	Ezra Frech; United States	Shailesh Kumar; India	Łukasz Mamczarz; Poland
T64	Maciej Lepiato; Poland	not awarded	Praveen Kumar; India
T64	Jonathan Broom-Edwards; Great Britain	not awarded	Praveen Kumar; India

== Results ==
=== T47 ===
The event took place on 11 July.

Rank	Athlete	Result	Notes
1st place, gold medalist(s)	Roderick Townsend (USA)	2.16	WR
2nd place, silver medalist(s)	Nishad Kumar (IND)	2.09	AR
3rd place, bronze medalist(s)	Dallas Wise (USA)	2.04	
4	Chen Hongjie (CHN)	1.95	
5	Rampal Chahar (IND)	1.95	PB
6	Zhao Yalong (CHN)	1.92	=PB
7	Angkarn Chanaboon (THA)	1.92	SB
8	Abdullah Ilgaz (TUR)	1.81	
9	Abdou Ba (SEN)	1.77	PB

=== T63 ===
The event took place on 13 July.

Rank	Athlete	Result	Notes
1st place, gold medalist(s)	Ezra Frech (USA)	1.95	WR
2nd place, silver medalist(s)	Shailesh Kumar (IND)	1.83	=CR
3rd place, bronze medalist(s)	Łukasz Mamczarz (POL)	1.80	SB
4	Mariyappan Thangavelu (IND)	1.80	SB
5	Sharad Kumar (IND)	1.77	SB
6	Yves Noe Batifi Loumou (CMR)	1.73	PB
7	El Hadji Mouhamed Gaye (SEN)	1.69	
8	Kantinan Khumphong (THA)	1.55	

=== T64 ===
The event took place on 10 July.

Rank	Athlete	Result	Notes
1st place, gold medalist(s)	Maciej Lepiato (POL)	2.05	SB
1st place, gold medalist(s)	Jonathan Broom-Edwards (GBR)	2.05	SB
3rd place, bronze medalist(s)	Praveen Kumar (IND)	2.01	SB
4	Temurbek Giyazov (UZB)	1.97	SB
5	Unni Renu (IND)	1.85	
6	Toru Suzuki (JPN)	1.85	
7	Loic Wandji Ngono (CMR)	1.77	PB
8	Syam Injamuri (IND)	1.69	
9	Mamadou Ba (SEN)	1.60	PB
