= 2025 World Para Athletics Championships – Men's high jump =

The men's high jump events at the 2025 World Para Athletics Championships were held at the Jawaharlal Nehru Stadium, Delhi in New Delhi.

== Medalists ==
Event	Gold	Silver	Bronze
T47	Nishad Kumar; India	Abdullah Ilgaz; Turkey	Roderick Townsend-Roberts; United States
T63	Shailesh Kumar; India	Ezra Frech; United States	Varun Singh Bhati; India
T64	Temurbek Giyazov; Uzbekistan	Jonathan Broom-Edwards; Great Britain	Praveen Kumar; India

== T47 ==
Final

The event took place on 3 October.

Rank	Name	Nationality	Сlass	1.67	1.72	1.77	1.82	1.86	1.90	1.94	1.97	2.00	2.03	2.06	2.08	2.10	2.12	2.14	2.18	Result	Notes
1st place, gold medalist(s)	Nishad Kumar	India	T47	–	–	–	–	–	–	o	–	o	o	o	o	o	–	o	xxx	2.14	AS
2nd place, silver medalist(s)	Abdullah Ilgaz	Turkey	T47	–	–	–	–	o	–	o	o	o	o	o	o	xx–	x			2.08	ER
3rd place, bronze medalist(s)	Roderick Townsend	United States	T46	–	–	–	–	–	–	–	–	–	o	x–	xx					2.03	
4	Georgii Margiev	Neutral Paralympic Athletes	T47	–	o	–	o	o	o	o	xxx									1.94	SB
5	Ivan Botvich	Neutral Paralympic Athletes	T46	–	o	o	o	o	o	xxo	xxx									1.94	PB
5	Rampal Chahar	India	T47	–	–	–	–	o	o	xxo	xxx									1.94	SB
7	Zhao Yalong	China	T47	–	o	–	o	–	xxo	xxx										1.90	SB
8	Muhammadabdulloh Tursunjonov	Uzbekistan	T47	–	–	o	xo	o	xxx											1.86	PB
	Fabrice Aimerique Chedjou Kengne	Cameroon	T46	DNS																	

== T63 ==
Final

The event took place on 27 September.

Rank	Name	Nationality	Сlass	1.60	1.65	1.70	1.74	1.78	1.82	1.85	1.88	1.91	1.94	Result	Notes
1st place, gold medalist(s)	Shailesh Kumar	India	T42	–	–	–	–	–	o	o	xo	xo	xxx	1.91	CR
2nd place, silver medalist(s)	Ezra Frech	United States	T63	–	–	–	–	o	o	o	xxx			1.85	SB
3rd place, bronze medalist(s)	Varun Singh Bhati	India	T42	–	–	–	o	–	o	xxo	xxx			1.85	
4	Rahul	India	T42	–	–	–	o	xo	xxx					1.78	PB
5	Łukasz Mamczarz	Poland	T42	o	o	o	o	xx–	x					1.74	SB
	Yves Noe Batifi Loumou	Cameroon	T42	DNS											

== T64 ==
Final

The event took place on 4 October.

Rank	Name	Nationality	Сlass	1.65	1.70	1.75	1.79	1.83	1.87	1.91	1.94	1.97	2.00	2.03	2.06	Result	Notes
1st place, gold medalist(s)	Temurbek Giyazov	Uzbekistan	T44	–	–	–	–	o	–	o	o	xo	o	o	x	2.03	=PB
2nd place, silver medalist(s)	Jonathan Broom-Edwards	Great Britain	T44	–	–	–	–	–	–	xxo	o	xo	o	xx–	x	2.00	SB
3rd place, bronze medalist(s)	Praveen Kumar	India	T44	–	–	–	–	–	–	–	o	o	xo	xxx		2.00	SB
4	Maciej Lepiato	Poland	T44	–	–	–	–	–	o	o	o	xo	xx–	x		1.97	
5	Derek Loccident	United States	T64	–	–	–	o	o	–	xxo	xxx					1.91	
6	Banti	India	T44	–	–	xo	o	xo	xxo	xxx						1.87	PB
7	Md Selim Reza	Bangladesh	T44	o	o	xxo	o	xxx								1.79	PB
8	Zeng Yize	China	T44	o	xo	xo	xxx									1.75	
	Gilbert Ampiah	Ghana	T44	DNS													
