= 2021 World Para Athletics European Championships – Men's high jump =

Previous championship event

Two men's high jump events were held at the 2021 World Para Athletics European Championships in Bydgoszcz, Poland.

== Medalists ==
Event	Gold		Silver		Bronze	
T42/T44/T63/T64	Maciej Lepiato (POL)	2.08	Jonathan Broom-Edwards (GBR)	2.04	Łukasz Mamczarz (POL)	1.75 CR
T47	Georgii Margiev (RUS)	1.94 CR	Alexandre Dipoko-Ewane (FRA)	1.91 SB	Abdullah Ilgaz (TUR)	1.91 PB
WR world record | ER European record | CR championship record | NR national record | WL world leading | EL European leading | PB personal best | SB seasonal best

== See also ==
- List of IPC world records in athletics
