= Athletics at the 2012 Summer Paralympics – Men's high jump =

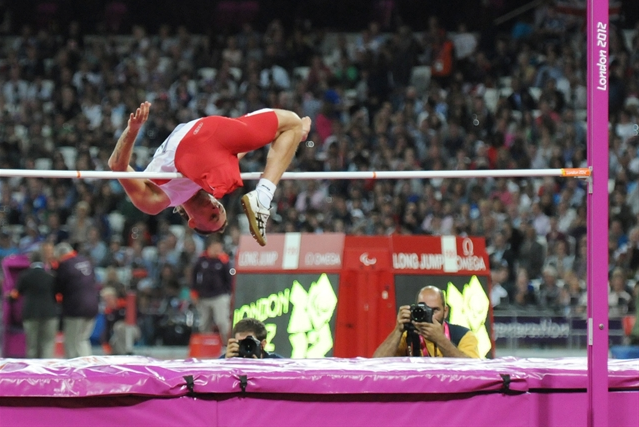

The Men's High Jump athletics events for the 2012 Summer Paralympics took place at the London Olympic Stadium on 3 September and 8 September. A total of 2 events were contested for 2 different classifications.

== Results ==
=== F42 ===
Rank	Name	Nationality	1.40	1.45	1.50	1.55	1.60	1.65	1.68	1.71	1.74	1.77	Result	Note
1st place, gold medalist(s)	Iliesa Delana	Fiji	–	–	–	–	–	o	o	o	o	xxx	1.74	RR
2nd place, silver medalist(s)	Girisha Hosanagara Nagarajegowda	India	–	–	–	–	o	o	o	xo	o	xxx	1.74	PB
3rd place, bronze medalist(s)	Lukasz Mamczarz	Poland	–	–	–	xxo	o	xo	o	xo	xxo	xxx	1.74	
4	Weizhong Guo	China	–	–	–	–	o	o	o	o	xxx		1.71	SB
5	Flavio Reitz	Brazil	–	–	o	o	xo	xxo	o	xxx			1.68	PB
6	Andy Avellana	Philippines	–	–	xo	o	xxx						1.55	PB
7	Lesly Kumara Dobagoda Liyanage	Sri Lanka	o	o	o	xxx							1.50	PB

=== F46 ===
Competition took place on 8 September.

Rank	Athlete	Nationality	Class	1.70	1.75	1.80	1.85	1.90	1.95	1.98	2.01	2.04	2.06	2.08	2.10	2.12	2.14	Best	Notes
1st place, gold medalist(s)	Maciej Lepiato	Poland	F44	–	–	–	–	o	–	o	o	o	o	o	–	xo	xxr	2.12	WR
2nd place, silver medalist(s)	Jeff Skiba	United States	F44	–	–	–	–	–	xxo	o	xo	xo	x-	x-	x			2.04	
3rd place, bronze medalist(s)	Chen Hongjie	China	F46	–	–	o	o	o	xo	xxo	xo	xxx						2.01	PR
4	Toru Suzuki	Japan	F44	–	–	o	o	o	xxo	xxo	xxx							1.98	=RR
5	Angcan Chanaboon	Thailand	F46	–	o	xo	xo	xo	o	xxx								1.95	PB
6	Wang Qiuhong	China	F44	o	o	o	o	xxx										1.85	PB
7	Reinhold Boetzel	Germany	F46	–	–	o	xxo	xxx										1.85	
8	Lal Pattiwila	Sri Lanka	F44	–	o	o	xxx											1.80	=PB
9	Richard Browne	United States	F44	–	–	xo	xxx											1.80	
