= 2017 World Para Athletics Championships – Men's high jump =

The men's high jump at the 2017 World Para Athletics Championships was held at the Olympic Stadium in London from 14 to 23 July.

== Medalists ==
Event	Gold		Silver		Bronze	
T13	Isaac Jean-Paul; United States	2.17 WR	Tyson Gunter; United States	1.88	Luis Felipe Gutierrez; Cuba	1.88
T42	Sam Grewe; United States	1.86 CR	Sharad Kumar; India	1.84	Varun Bhati; India	1.77 PB
T44	Maciej Lepiato; Poland	2.14	Jonathan Broom-Edwards; Great Britain	2.08	Toru Suzuki; Japan	2.01 SB
T47	Roderick Townsend-Roberts; United States	2.10 CR	Aaron Chatman; Australia	1.94 SB	Chen Hongjie; China	1.94
WR world record | AR area record | CR championship record | GR games record | NR national record | OR Olympic record | PB personal best | SB season best | WL world leading (in a given season)

Events listed in pink were contested but no medals were awarded.

== See also ==
- List of IPC world records in athletics
