= 2024 World Para Athletics Championships – Men's high jump =

The men's high jump events at the 2024 World Para Athletics Championships were held in Kobe.

== Medalists ==
| Event | Gold | Silver | Bronze |
|---|---|---|---|
| T47 | Roderick Townsend-Roberts; United States | Nishad Kumar; India | Georgii Margiev; Neutral Paralympic Athletes (NPA) |
| T63 | Mariyappan Thangavelu; India | Ezra Frech; United States | Sam Grewe; United States |
| T64 | Jonathan Broom-Edwards; Great Britain | Derek Loccident; United States | Maciej Lepiato; Poland |
