= Athletics at the 2008 Summer Paralympics – Men's high jump F44/46 =

The Men's High Jump F44/46 had its Final held on September 14 at 18:50.

== Medalists ==
Gold	Jeff Skiba; United States
Silver	Aaron Chatman; Australia
Bronze	Hongjie Chen; China

== Results ==
Place	Athlete	Class	1.73	1.78	1.81	1.84	1.87	1.90	1.93	1.96	Result
Place	Athlete	Class	1.99	2.02	2.05	2.08	2.10	2.11	2.15		Points
1	Jeff Skiba (USA)	F44	-	-	-	-	-	-	o	-	2.11 WR
1	Jeff Skiba (USA)	F44	o	o	o	-	-	xo	xxx		1056
2	Aaron Chatman (AUS)	F46	-	-	-	-	o	-	o	o	2.02
2	Aaron Chatman (AUS)	F46	o	o	xxx						1011
3	Hongjie Chen (CHN)	F46	-	-	xo	o	o	o	xo	xo	1.96
3	Hongjie Chen (CHN)	F46	xxx								980
4	Jun Du (CHN)	F46	-	-	o	o	-	xo	o	xxx	1.93
4	Jun Du (CHN)	F46									965
5	Toru Suzuki (JPN)	F44	-	-	o	o	o	xxo	o	xxx	1.93
5	Toru Suzuki (JPN)	F44									965
6	Reinhold Botzel (GER)	F46	-	-	o	-	xo	xxx			1.87
6	Reinhold Botzel (GER)	F46									935
7	Yancong Wu (CHN)	F46	-	o	-	o	-	xxx			1.84
7	Yancong Wu (CHN)	F46									920
8	David Roos (RSA)	F46	-	-	xxo	o	xxx				1.84
8	David Roos (RSA)	F46									920
9	Christos Kapellas (GRE)	F44	xo	xo	xo	xxx					1.81
9	Christos Kapellas (GRE)	F44									905
10	Pattiwila Arachchi (SRI)	F44	o	xxx							1.73
10	Pattiwila Arachchi (SRI)	F44									865
