= 2018 World Para Athletics European Championships – Men's high jump =

Tournament

The men's High jump at the 2018 World Para Athletics European Championships was held at the Friedrich-Ludwig-Jahn-Sportpark in Berlin from 20 to 26 August.

== Medalists ==
Event	Gold		Silver		Bronze	
T47	Alexandre Dipoko-Ewani (FRA)	1.89 CR	Daniel Perez Martinez (ESP)	1.78	Jordan Lee (IRL)	1.75
T42/44/63/64 factored event	Maciej Lepiato (POL) (T44)	2.14; 922 pts	Łukasz Mamczarz (POL) (T63)	1.70; 738 pts	Tarik Taha Buyrukoglu (TUR) (T64)	1.80; 371 pts
WR world record | AR area record | CR championship record | GR games record | NR national record | OR Olympic record | PB personal best | SB season best | WL world leading (in a given season)

== See also ==
- List of IPC world records in athletics
