= Athletics at the 2004 Summer Paralympics – Men's high jump F42–46 =

Men's high jump events for amputee athletes were held at the 2004 Summer Paralympics in the Athens Olympic Stadium. Events were held in two disability classes.

== F42 ==
Men's High Jump F42 at the XII Paralympic Games
- Venue: Athens Olympic Stadium
- Dates: 23 September 2004
- Competitors: 6 from 5 nations
- Winning height: 1.77

Medalists
1st place, gold medalist(s)		Hou Bin	China
2nd place, silver medalist(s)		Guo Wei Zhong	China
3rd place, bronze medalist(s)		Dennis Wliszczak	Austria

The F42 event was won by Hou Bin, representing China.

23 September 2004, 10:15

Rank	Athlete	Result	Notes
1st place, gold medalist(s)	Hou Bin (CHN)	1.77	
2nd place, silver medalist(s)	Guo Wei Zhong (CHN)	1.74	
3rd place, bronze medalist(s)	Dennis Wliszczak (AUT)	1.68	
4	Heinrich Popow (GER)	1.65	
5	Leszek Cmikiewicz (POL)	1.60	
6	Hristo Gerganski (BUL)	1.50	

== F44/46 ==
Men's High Jump F44/46 at the XII Paralympic Games
- Venue: Athens Olympic Stadium
- Dates: 27 September 2004
- Competitors: 11 from 9 nations
- Winning height: 1.97

Medalists
1st place, gold medalist(s)		Wu Yancong	China
2nd place, silver medalist(s)		Jeffrey Skiba	United States
3rd place, bronze medalist(s)		Wang Qiu Hong	China

The F44/46 event was won by Wu Yancong, representing China.

27 September 2004, 09:35

Rank	Athlete	Result	Notes
1st place, gold medalist(s)	Wu Yancong (CHN)	1.97	=WR
2nd place, silver medalist(s)	Jeffrey Skiba (USA)	1.97	
3rd place, bronze medalist(s)	Wang Qiu Hong (CHN)	1.94	
4	Xie Zhao Xing (CHN)	1.91	
5	David Roos (RSA)	1.85	
6	Miltiadis Stathopoulos (GRE)	1.80	
7	Toru Suzuki (JPN)	1.80	
8	Arnaud Assoumani (FRA)	1.80	
9	Reinhold Boetzel (GER)	1.75	
10	Bandara Thennakoon (SRI)	1.60	
	C. Raghu (IND)		NMR
