= 2015 IPC Athletics World Championships – Men's high jump =

The men's high jump at the 2015 IPC Athletics World Championships was held at the Suheim Bin Hamad Stadium in Doha from 22–31 October.

== Medalists ==
Event	Gold		Silver		Bronze	
T12	Siarhei Burdukou; Belarus	1.89 =CR	Ihar Fartunau; Belarus	1.85	Andrey Shashko; Russia	1.79
T42	Sam Grewe; United States	1.81 CR	Hamada Hassan; Egypt	1.78	Lukasz Mamczarz; Poland	1.78 SB
T44	Maciej Lepiato; Poland	2.18 WR	Jonathan Broom-Edwards; Great Britain	2.05	Jeff Skiba; United States	1.96
T47	Roderick Townsend-Roberts; United States	2.03 CR	Chen Hongjie; China	1.88 SB	Zhou Wu; China	1.85 PB
WR world record | AR area record | CR championship record | GR games record | NR national record | OR Olympic record | PB personal best | SB season best | WL world leading (in a given season)

== See also ==
- List of IPC world records in athletics
