= 2016 IPC Athletics European Championships – Men's high jump =

The men's 1,500 metres at the 2016 IPC Athletics European Championships was held at the Stadio Olimpico Carlo Zecchini in Grosseto from 11–16 June.

== Medalists ==
Event	Gold		Silver		Bronze	
T12	Siarhei Burdukou; Belarus	1.90 PB	Andrey Shashko; Russia	1.80 PB	Salvador Cano Garcia; Spain	1.74
T42-T44	Lukasz Mamczarz (T42); Poland	1.75 CR	Maciej Lepiato (T44); Poland	2.11	Jonathan Broom-Edwards (T44); Great Britain	2.07
T47	Alexandre Dipoko-Ewane (T46); France	1.88 CR	Reinhold Boetzel (T46); Germany	1.80	Ivan Botvich (T46); Russia	1.80
WR world record | AR area record | CR championship record | GR games record | NR national record | OR Olympic record | PB personal best | SB season best | WL world leading (in a given season)

== See also ==
- List of IPC world records in athletics
