= Temurbek Giyazov =

Uzbekistani Paralympic athlete (born 1996)

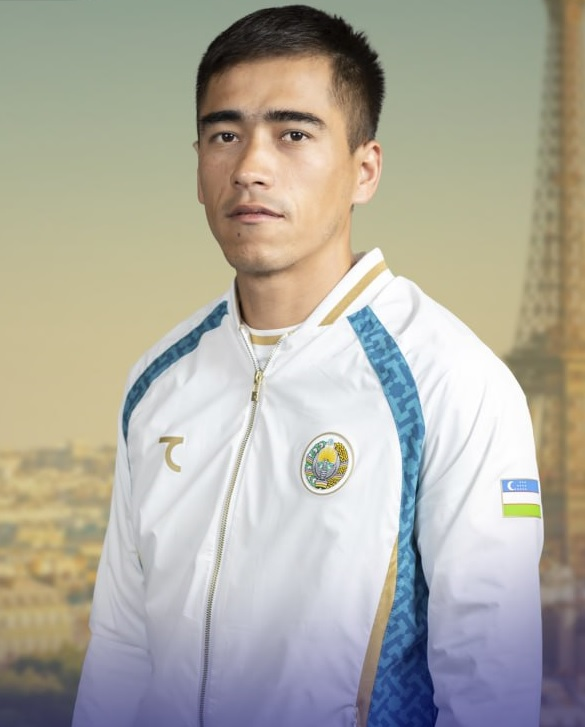
- Giyazov in 2024

Personal information
- Nationality: Uzbekistani
- Born: 15 March 1996 (age 30)
- Home town: Tashkent, Uzbekistan

Sport
- Sport: Para-athletics
- Disability class: T44
- Event: high jump
Medal record
Men's para-athletics
Representing Uzbekistan
Paralympic Games
Bronze medal – third place	2024 Paris	High jump T64
World Championships
Gold medal – first place	2025 New Delhi	High jump T64
Silver medal – second place	2019 Dubai	High jump T44
Asian Para Games
Gold medal – first place	2018 Jakarta	High jump T44/64
Silver medal – second place	2022 Hangzhou	High jump T64

Temurbek Giyazov (born 15 March 1996) is an Uzbekistani para-athlete specializing in high jump.

== Career ==
He won the silver medal in the men's high jump T64 event at the 2019 World Para Athletics Championships held in Dubai, United Arab Emirates. In 2021, he competed in the men's high jump T64 event at the 2020 Summer Paralympics held in Tokyo, Japan. He finished in 6th place.

In 2023, Giyazov finished in 4th place in the men's high jump T64 event at the 2023 World Para Athletics Championships held in Paris, France. A few months later, he won the silver medal in his event at the 2022 Asian Para Games held in Hangzhou, China.

Giyazov represented Uzbekistan at the 2024 Summer Paralympics and won a joint bronze medal in the high jump T64 event along with Maciej Lepiato.
