= Ihar Fartunau =

Belarusian Paralympic athlete

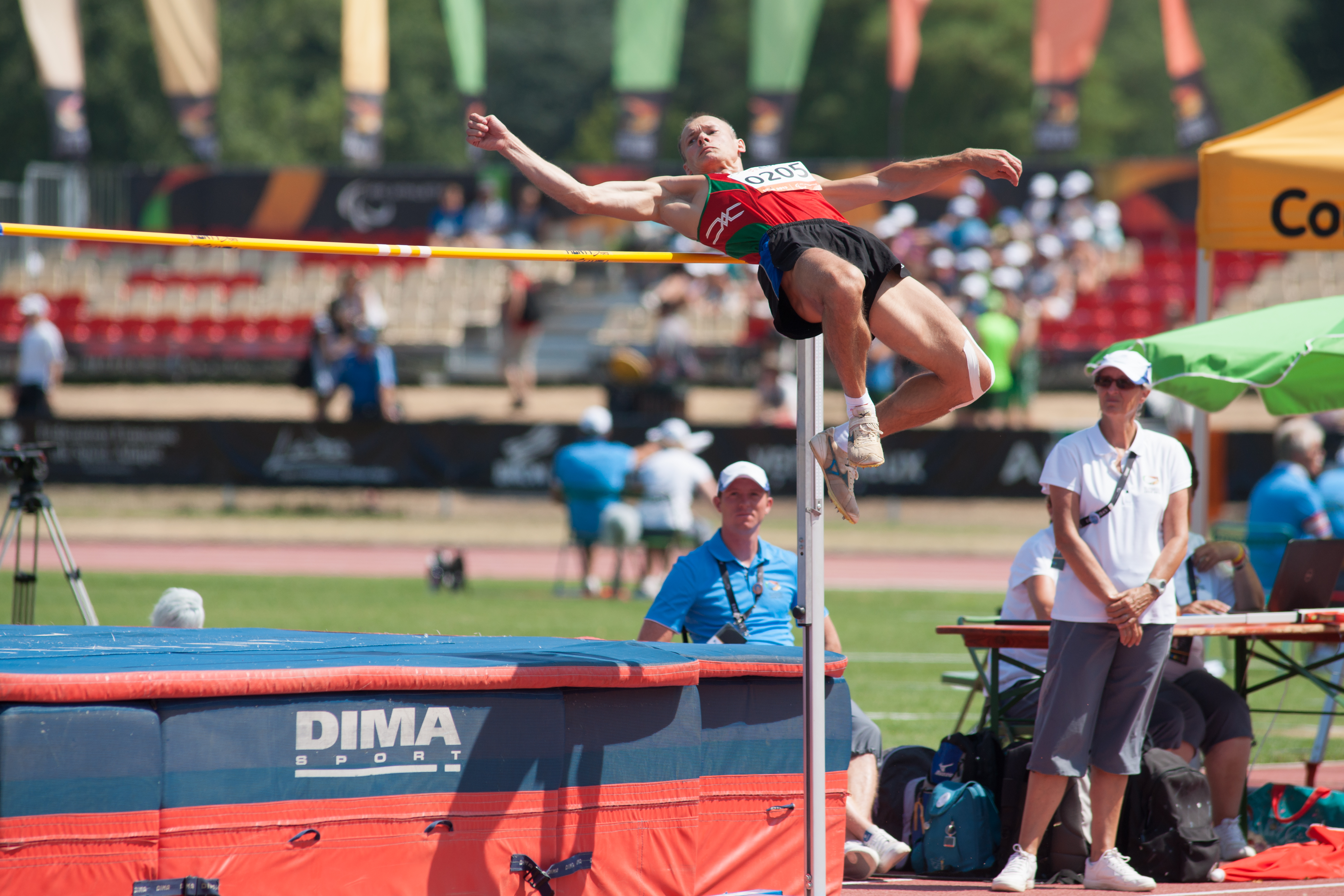
- Ihar Fartunau at the 2013 IPC Athletics World Championships.

Personal information
- Born: Ігар Фартунаў; 17 April 1973 (age 53)

Sport
- Country: Belarus
- Sport: Athletics
- Disability class: F13, P13
- Event(s): Long jump High jump Triple jump Pentathlon

Achievements and titles
- Paralympic finals: 1996, 2004
- Personal best(s): Shot Put: 14.71m Discus: 47.72m
Medal record
Event	1st	2nd	3rd
Paralympic Games	1	3	1
World Championships	3	2	2
European Championships	1	0	0
Track and field (P13)
Representing Belarus
Paralympic Games
Gold medal – first place	2004 Athens	Pentathlon - P13
Silver medal – second place	1996 Atlanta	Triple jump - F12
Silver medal – second place	1996 Atlanta	Long jump - F12
Silver medal – second place	1996 Atlanta	Long jump - F13
Bronze medal – third place	1996 Atlanta	Pentathlon - P12
IPC World Championships
Gold medal – first place	2002 Lille	Long jump - F13
Gold medal – first place	2011 Christchurch	High jump - F13
Gold medal – first place	2013 Lyon	High jump - F13
Silver medal – second place	2006 Assen	Long jump - F13
Silver medal – second place	2013 Lyon	Long jump - F13
Silver medal – second place	2015 Doha	High jump - F12
Bronze medal – third place	2002 Lille	100m - F13
Bronze medal – third place	2002 Lille	200m - F13
IPC European Championships
Gold medal – first place	2012 Stadskanaal	Long jump - F13
Bronze medal – third place	2016 Grosseto	Long jump - F13

Ihar Fartunau (Belarusian: Ігар Фартунаў; born 17 April 1973) is a visually impaired Paralympic athlete from Belarus.

== Career history ==
Fartunau competed in the 1996 Summer Paralympics in Atlanta, United States. There he won a silver medal in the men's Triple jump - F12 event, a silver medal in the men's Long jump - F12 event, a bronze medal in the men's Pentathlon - P12 event and finished fourth in the men's 100 metres - T12 event. He also competed at the 2000 Summer Paralympics in Sydney, Australia. There he did not finish in the men's Pentathlon - P13 event. He also competed at the 2004 Summer Paralympics in Athens, Greece. There he won a gold medal in the men's Pentathlon - P13 event, a silver medal in the men's Long jump - F13 event, did not finish in the men's 100 metres - T13 event and went out in the first round of the men's 200 metres - T13. He also competed in the men's 100m - T13 at the 2008 Summer Paralympics in Beijing, China but went out in the heats.

In 2003, he set a high jump world record for F13 classified athletes; it still stands ten years later.
