= 2014 IPC Athletics European Championships – Men's high jump =

The men's high jump at the 2014 IPC Athletics European Championships was held at the Swansea University Stadium from 18–23 August.

== Medalists ==
Event	Gold		Silver		Bronze	
T12	Siarhei Burdukou; Belarus	1.84	Alexander Sorokin; Russia	1.78	Salvador Cano Garcia; Spain	1.72
T42	Lukasz Mamczarz; Poland	1.71	Baris Telli; Turkey	1.62	Marcel Jaroslawski; Poland	1.50
T44	Maciej Lepiato; Poland	2.17 WR	Jonathan Broom-Edwards; Great Britain	2.15	—	
T47	Reinhold Bötzel; Germany	1.80	Daniel Perez Martinez; Spain	1.71	—	

== Results ==
=== T12 ===
Rank	Sport Class	Name	Nationality	Result	Notes
1st place, gold medalist(s)	T12	Siarhei Burdukou	Belarus	1.84	PB
2nd place, silver medalist(s)	T12	Alexander Sorokin	Russia	1.78	
3rd place, bronze medalist(s)	T12	Salvador Cano Garcia	Spain	1.72	
4	T12	Milos Ranitovic	Montenegro	1.69	SB

=== T42 ===
Rank	Sport Class	Name	Nationality	Result	Notes
1st place, gold medalist(s)	T42	Lukasz Mamczarz	Poland	1.71	SB
2nd place, silver medalist(s)	T42	Baris Telli	Turkey	1.62	PB
3rd place, bronze medalist(s)	T42	Marcel Jaroslawski	Poland	1.50	
4	T42	Jeroen Teeuwen	Netherlands	1.45	

=== T44 ===
Rank	Sport Class	Name	Nationality	Result	Notes
1st place, gold medalist(s)	T44	Maciej Lepiato	Poland	2.17	WR
2nd place, silver medalist(s)	T44	Jonathan Broom-Edwards	Great Britain	2.15	PB
3	T44	Christos Kapellas	Greece	1.65	

=== T47 ===
Rank	Sport Class	Name	Nationality	Result	Notes
1st place, gold medalist(s)	T46	Reinhold Bötzel	Germany	1.80	SB
2nd place, silver medalist(s)	T46	Daniel Perez Martinez	Spain	1.71	PB
3	T47	Oguz Gokce	Turkey	1.60	PB

== See also ==
- List of IPC world records in athletics
