= 2013 IPC Athletics World Championships – Men's high jump =

The men's high jump at the 2013 IPC Athletics World Championships was held at the Stade du Rhône from 20–29 July.

== Medalists ==
Class	Gold	Silver	Bronze
T42/44	Maciej Lepiato; Poland	Jonathan Broom-Edwards; United Kingdom	Lukasz Mamczarz; Poland
T13	Ihar Fartunau; Belarus	Tyson Gunter; United States	Ivan Kytsenko; Ukraine

== See also ==
- List of IPC world records in athletics
