= Wang Qiuhong =

Chinese Paralympic athlete

Medal record

Men's para-athletics

Representing China

Paralympic Games
| Bronze medal – third place | 2004 Athens | High jump F44/46 |

Wang Qiu Hong is a paralympic athlete from China competing mainly in category F44 long and high jump events.

He competed at the 2004 Summer Paralympics where as well as being a part of the unsuccessful Chinese 4 × 100 m relay team he also competed in the long jump and won a bronze medal in the F44/46 high jump
