= Dallas Wise =

American Paralympic athlete

Personal information
- Born: December 14, 2000 (age 25) Columbia, South Carolina, U.S.

Sport
- Sport: Paralympic athletics
- Disability class: T47
- Event: high jump
Medal record
Men's Para-athletics
Representing United States
Paralympic Games
Silver medal – second place	2020 Tokyo	High jump T47
World Championships
Bronze medal – third place	2023 Paris	High jump T47

Dallas Wise (born December 14, 2000) is an American Paralympic high jumper. He made his first Paralympic appearance representing United States at the 2020 Summer Paralympics.

== Career ==
He became the first Coastal Carolina University alumni to compete at the Paralympics.

He claimed silver medal in the men's high jump T47 category at the 2020 Summer Paralympics. He incredibly shared the silver medal with Nishad Kumar of India who also cleared the same distance of 2.06m. As a result, bronze medal was not awarded to any of the athletes who competed in the high jump T47 category for men.
