= Varun Singh Bhati =

Indian para high jumper

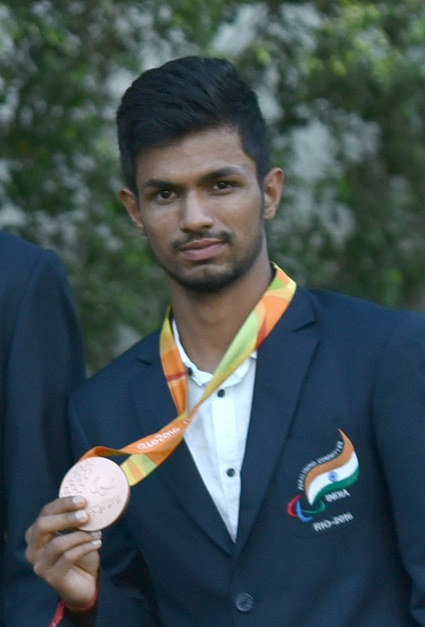
- Bhati at the 2016 Rio Paralympics

Personal information
- Born: 13 February 1995 (age 31)

Sport
- Sport: Para-athletics
- Disability class: T42/63
- Event: High Jump
Medal record
Men's para-athletics
Representing India
Paralympic Games
Bronze medal – third place	2016 Rio de Janeiro	High jump T42
World Championships
Bronze medal – third place	2017 London	High jump T42
Bronze medal – third place	2025 New Delhi	High jump T63
Asian Para Games
Silver medal – second place	2018 Indonesia	High jump T42/63

Varun Singh Bhati (born 13 February 1995) is an Indian para high jumper. He was afflicted by poliomyelitis at a young age, and joined sports during his school days. He has won medals in multiple international events including bronze at 2016 Rio Paralympics, 2017 and 2025 World Championships.

== Early life ==
Since 2014, he has been coached by Satyanarayana, a former national athlete. Bhati was supported by the GoSports Foundation through the Para Champions Programme. He lives in Greater Noida. He currently trains at the Sports Authority of India in Bangalore.

== Career ==
Bhati has T42 disability. He received attention in 2012 when he registered the 'A' qualification mark for the 2012 Summer Paralympic Games in London with a performance of 1.60 m. However, owing to limited slots available to India, he failed to qualify for the 2012 Games.

He participated in the 2014 Asian Para Games at Incheon, Korea where he stood 5th. He won a gold medal at the 2014 China Open Athletics Championship the same year. In 2015, he stood 5th again at the 2015 Para World Championship in Doha, Qatar. He recorded a jump of 1.82 m at the 2016 IPC Athletics Asia-Oceania Championship where he won a gold as well as set a new Asian record.

Bhati won the bronze medal in the 2016 Summer Paralympic Games at Rio de Janeiro, Brazil when he jumped 1.86 m, his personal best. He won the bronze in the 2017 World Para Athletics Championships by clearing a 1.77 m jump.

He won a silver medal in the 2018 Asian Para Games, recording a jump of 1.82 m.

== Awards ==
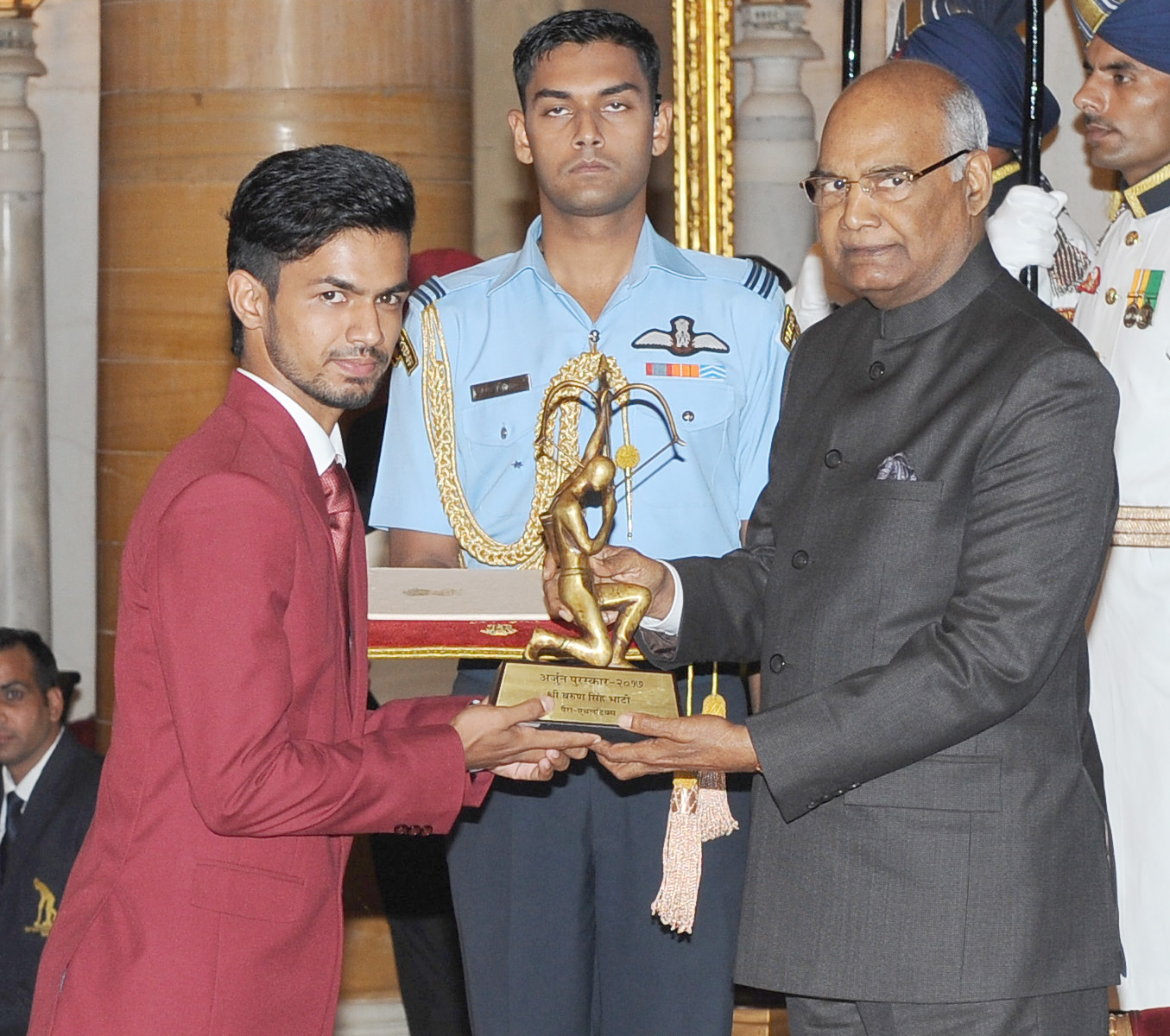
Varun Singh Bhati being awarded the Arjuna Award (2017) by the President of India, Ram Nath Kovind at Rashtrapati Bhavan in New Delhi on 29 August 2017

Bhati was awarded the Arjuna Award on 29 August 2018.

He was voted Para-athlete of the Year 2017 at the Times of India Sports Awards.

== See also ==
- Sharad Kumar
