= Derek Loccident =

American Paralympic athlete (born 1998)

Personal information
- Born: July 13, 1998 (age 28)
- Home town: Oklahoma City, Oklahoma, U.S.

Sport
- Sport: Paralympic athletics
- Disability class: T64
- Events: High jump Long jump Javelin
Medal record
Representing the United States
Paralympic athletics
Paralympic Games
Silver medal – second place	2024 Paris	High jump F64
Silver medal – second place	2024 Paris	Long jump F64
World Championships
Silver medal – second place	2023 Paris	Long jump T64
Silver medal – second place	2024 Kobe	Long jump T64
Silver medal – second place	2025 New Delhi	Long jump T64
Silver medal – second place	2024 Kobe	High jump T64
Bronze medal – third place	2024 Kobe	100 m T64

Derek Loccident (born July 13, 1998) is an American T64 Paralympic athlete.

== Early life ==
Loccident attended Westmoore High School where he played American football. During his senior year he recorded 53 tackles with one interception and earned All-Conference, All-District and Class 6A All-Star honors. He then played college football at Central Oklahoma. On September 9, 2018, he was crawling under a stopped train when it started moving and severed his left foot. He underwent several surgeries when doctors became concerned about infection in his leg, resulting in its amputation. Prior to the accident, during his redshirt sophomore year, he led the team in tackles with 15 in the team's first two games of the season. He missed the remainder of the 2018 season, the 2019 season, and the 2020 season due to the COVID-19 pandemic. He returned to play during the 2021 season as a below-the-knee amputee.

== Para-athletics career ==
After his collegiate football career ended in 2021, Loccident was recruited by U.S. Para track and field coach Joaquim Cruz, to try track and field as a Para athlete. By the end of 2022, he graduated and moved to California so he could train full time at the Chula Vista Elite Athlete Training Center as part of the sport's development program.

On May 25, 2023, he was selected to represent the United States at the 2023 World Para Athletics Championships, where he made his international debut. He won a silver medal in the long jump T64 event with a distance of 7.39 meters.

On March 18, 2024, he was selected to represent the United States at the 2024 World Para Athletics Championships. He will participate in the 100 meter dash, high jump, long jump and javelin. He won a silver medal in the high jump T64 event with a personal-best 2.04 meters in his first-ever international high jump competition. His jump was the first time a T64 athlete had ever surpassed two meters at a World Para Athletics Championships.

== Personal life ==
OKCThunder Films released a short film titled Steps that premiered at the DeadCENTER Film Festival on June 10, 2023, that documents Loccident's story.
