= Guo Weizhong =

Chinese Paralympic athlete

Medal record

Track and field (athletics)

Representing China

Paralympic Games
Silver medal – second place	2000 Sydney	High Jump - F42
Silver medal – second place	2004 Athens	High Jump - F42

Guo Wei Zhong is a former paralympic athlete from China who competed mainly in category F42 high and long jump events.

Guo Wei Zhong competed in both the 2000 and the 2004 Summer Paralympics. On both occasions he competed in the long jump and won silver in the high jump.
