= Dennis Wliszczak =

Austrian Paralympic athlete

Personal information
- Born: February 6, 1978 (age 48)
- Height: 6 ft 3 in (1.91 m)
- Weight: 130 lb (59 kg)
- Website: www.wliszczak.at

Sport
- Disability: Leg Amputee
Medal record
Paralympic athletics
Representing Austria
Paralympic Games
Bronze medal – third place	2004 Athens	High Jump - F42
- Updated on 11 August 2013

Dennis Wliszczak (born February 6, 1978) is a paralympic athlete from Austria competing mainly in category F42 high jump events.

Dennis competed in the high jump in the 2004 Summer Paralympics in Athens winning the bronze medal.
