= Nishad Kumar =

Indian Paralympic athlete (born 1999)

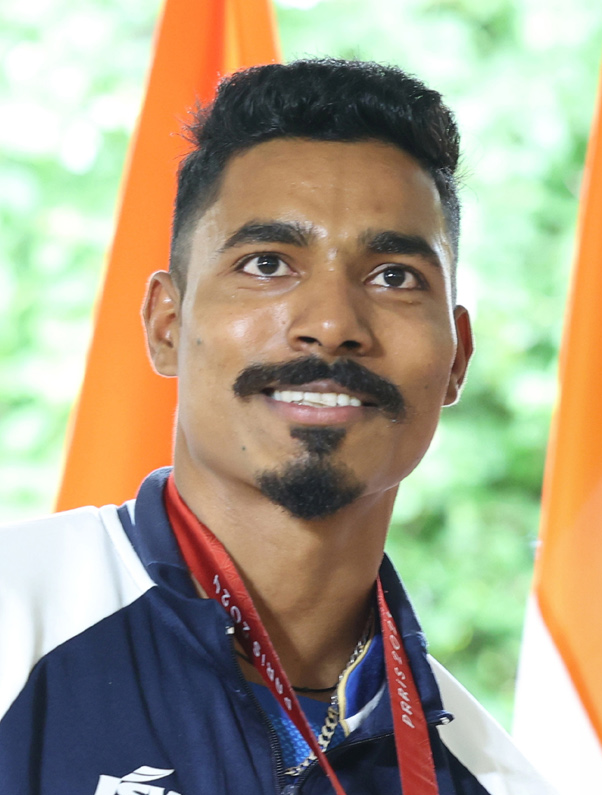
- Kumar in 2024

Personal information
- Born: 3 October 1999 (age 27) Amb, Himachal Pradesh, India
- Education: Bachelor of Physical Education; Lovely Professional University

Sport
- Sport: Para-athletics
- Disability class: T47
- Event: High jump

Achievements and titles
- Personal best: 2.14 m AR (2025)
Medal record
Men's para-athletics
Representing India
Paralympic Games
Silver medal – second place	2020 Tokyo	High jump T47
Silver medal – second place	2024 Paris	High jump T47
World Championships
Gold medal – first place	2025 New Delhi	High jump T47
Silver medal – second place	2023 Paris	High jump T47
Silver medal – second place	2024 Kobe	High jump T47
Bronze medal – third place	2019 Dubai	High jump T47
Asian Para Games
Gold medal – first place	2022 Hangzhou	High jump T47
Gold medal – first place	2026 Aichi–Nagoya	Long jump T47

Nishad Kumar (born 3 October 1999) is an Indian para high jumper. He won the silver medal at the 2020 Tokyo Paralympics and retained his silver at the 2024 Paris Paralympics.

== Early life and education ==
Nishad is from Baduan village of Amb sub-division in Una District, Himachal Pradesh. His father was a farmer. His mother, a state-level volleyball player and a discus thrower, was his inspiration. At the age of six, his right hand was severed accidentally by a grass-cutting machine in his family farm. He did his college in DAV College, Sector 10 in Chandigarh. He later pursued his higher education at the Himachal Pradesh University. He is studying for a PE at Lovely Professional University. In early 2021, he tested positive for COVID-19. He is supported by Olympic Gold Quest, a sports NGO.

== Career ==
He took up the sport of para-athletics in 2009. In November 2019, he won the bronze medal in the men's T47 category at the 2019 World Para Athletics Championships and, as a result, he qualified to compete at the 2020 Summer Paralympics. He won the gold medal in T46 category at the 2021 World Para Athletics Grand Prix which was held in Dubai.

He also became the second Indian to win a medal at the 2020 Summer Paralympics after Bhavina Patel when he clinched a silver in the men's high jump T47 category along with an Asian Record. He shared the silver medal with Dallas Wise of USA who also cleared the same distance of 2.06m.

In the 2022 Asian Para Games, he won a gold medal in the men's high jump T47 at Hangzhou, China.

Coach Mr Satyanarayana is coaching on the medal Tokyo Paralympic Games 2020 and the Paris Paralympic Games 2024.
