= Ezra Frech =

American Paralympic athlete (born 2005)

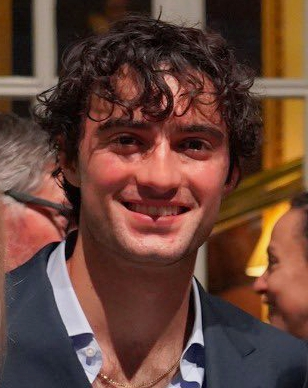
- Ezra Frech at the Ralph Lauren Palazzo in Milan before the 2026 Winter Olympics

Personal information
- Born: May 11, 2005 (age 21) Los Angeles, California, U.S.
- Height: 6 ft 1 in (1.86 m)
- Weight: 150 lb (68 kg)
- Parent: Bahar Soomekh (mother) Clayton Frech (father)
- Relative: Saba Soomekh (aunt)

Sport
- Country: United States
- Sport: Para-athletics
- Disability class: T63
- Events: Long jump; High jump; 100 meters
- University team: USC Trojans

Achievements and titles
- Personal bests: High jump T63: 1.97 m (6 ft 5 1/2 in) (2024, WR); Long jump T63: 7.05 m (23 ft 1 1/2 in) (2024, NR); 100 m T63: 12.06 s (2024)
Medal record
Para-athletics
Representing United States
Paralympic Games
Gold medal – first place	2024 Paris	100 m T63
Gold medal – first place	2024 Paris	High jump T63
World Championships
Gold medal – first place	2023 Paris	High jump T63
Silver medal – second place	2024 Kobe	High jump T63
Silver medal – second place	2025 New Delhi	High jump T63
World Junior Championships
Gold medal – first place	2019 Nottwil	High jump T63
Bronze medal – third place	2019 Nottwil	Long jump T63
Bronze medal – third place	2019 Nottwil	100 m T63
Parapan American Games
Silver medal – second place	2019 Lima	High jump T42-47/63-64
Silver medal – second place	2019 Lima	Long jump T63/64

Ezra Frech (born May 11, 2005) is an American track and field athlete who competes in high jump, long jump and sprinting events. He is a two-time Paralympian, having competed at the 2020 Summer Paralympics and won two gold medals at the 2024 Summer Paralympics. He also won two silver medals at the 2019 Parapan American Games. Frech is a motivational speaker and disability rights advocate.

== Early life ==
Frech was born in Los Angeles, California, to Bahar Soomekh, an actress born in Iran and raised in Los Angeles, and Clayton Frech, an American of German heritage. He has two younger brothers, Gabriel and Elijah.

Frech was born without most of his left leg (missing a knee and fibula) and missing fingers on his left hand. He received his first prosthetic leg when he was 11 months old. When he was 2 years old, Frech had surgery to remove his lower left leg and transplanted a toe from his amputated foot onto his left hand at Boston Children's Hospital.

Frech is a 2023 graduate of the Brentwood School. In February 2024, he became the first above-the-knee amputee to commit to an NCAA Division I track and field team at the University of Southern California. As of 2025, he was studying for a bachelor's degree in cinematic arts.

== Career ==
As a child, Frech played basketball, baseball, soccer, and karate before focusing on track and field when he was 8 years old. His first track meet was in 2013 at the Endeavor Games in Edmond, Oklahoma, where he broke several national youth records and was inspired to continue in track and field.

Frech was a 2014 finalist for Sports Illustrated Sportkid of the Year.

Frech's first international meet was at the 2019 World Para Athletics Junior Championships, where he won one gold and two bronze medals. He won two silver medals at the 2019 Parapan American Games.

Frech was the youngest athlete to compete at the 2019 World Para Athletics Championships in Dubai. He made the finals in all three of his events, but did not medal.

In 2021, at the delayed 2020 Summer Paralympic Games in Tokyo, Frech placed 5th in the high jump T63 event with a personal best of 1.80 m (5 ft 10 3/4 in) (missing the podium by 3 cm) and 8th in the long jump T63 event with 5.85 m (19 ft 2 1/4 in).

At the 2023 World Para Athletics Championships in Paris, Frech won the gold medal in high jump T63 and set a new world record at 1.95 m (6 ft 4 3/4 in). He also competed in the men's long jump T63 event.

At the 2024 World Para Athletics Championships in Kobe, he placed 2nd in the high jump T63 and 4th in the long jump T63.

Frech broke his own world record in high jump T63 at the 2024 USA Paralympic Trials with a jump of 1.97 m (6 ft 5 1/2 in). He also placed first in the long jump T63, breaking the U.S. record with a jump of 7.05 m (23 ft 1 1/2 in).

Frech competed at the 2024 Summer Paralympics in Paris, winning gold in the 100 meters T63 with a time of 12.06 seconds, and gold in the men's high jump T63 on his first jump at a height of 1.94 m (6 ft 4 1/4 in), which also set a Paralympic Games record.

== Philanthropy ==
In 2006, Frech's family founded Team Ezra to provide financial resources to organizations that serve people with physical disabilities. Frech started speaking to schools at the age of 4 to raise awareness for people with impairments as part of his organization's project.

In 2013, Frech founded Angel City Sports to provide free, year-round access to sport training, equipment, and competitive opportunities for kids and adults with physical disabilities. Angel City Sports hosts one of the largest adaptive sporting events in the country, the Angel City Games, as well as events for veterans, first responders, and youth.

== Competition history ==
=== International competitions ===
Representing the United States
Year	Competition	Venue	Position	Event	Result	Notes
2019	World Para Junior Championships	Nottwil, Switzerland	1st	High jump 15-16	5.075 m (16 ft 7 3/4 in)	—N/a
2019	World Para Junior Championships	Nottwil, Switzerland	1st	Long jump 15-16		—N/a
2019	World Para Junior Championships	Nottwil, Switzerland	3rd	100 m 15-16	13.88 s	—N/a
2019	Parapan American Games	Lima, Peru	2nd	High jump T42-47/T63-64	1.74 m (5 ft 8 1/2 in)	—N/a
2019	Parapan American Games	Lima, Peru	2nd	Long jump T63/T64	5.43 m (17 ft 9 3/4 in)	—N/a
2019	Parapan American Games	Lima, Peru	7th	100 m T64	13.82 s	—N/a
2019	World Para Championships	Dubai, UAE	7th	High jump T63	1.74 m (5 ft 8 1/2 in)	—N/a
2019	World Para Championships	Dubai, UAE	8th	Long jump T63	5.45 m (17 ft 10 1/2 in)	—N/a
2019	World Para Championships	Dubai, UAE	8th	100 m T63	13.67 s	—N/a
2021	Paralympic Games	Tokyo, Japan	5th	High jump T63	1.80 m (5 ft 10 3/4 in)	—N/a
2021	Paralympic Games	Tokyo, Japan	8th	Long jump T63	5.85 m (19 ft 2 1/4 in)	—N/a
2023	World Para Championships	Paris, France	1st	High jump T63	1.95 m (6 ft 4 3/4 in)	—N/a
2023	World Para Championships	Paris, France	4th	Long jump T63	6.64 m (21 ft 9 1/4 in)	—N/a
2023	World Para Championships	Paris, France	6th	100 m T63	12.45 s	—N/a
2024	World Para Championships	Kobe, Japan	2nd	High jump T63	1.85 m (6 ft 3/4 in)	—N/a
2024	World Para Championships	Kobe, Japan	4th	Long jump T63	6.58 m (21 ft 7 in)	—N/a
2024	Paralympic Games	Paris, France	1st	High jump T63	1.80 m (5 ft 10 3/4 in)	WR PR NR PB
2024	Paralympic Games	Paris, France	1st	100 m T63	12.06 s	PB
2024	Paralympic Games	Paris, France	5th	Long jump T63	6.58 m (21 ft 7 in)	—N/a

=== National competitions ===
Year	Competition	Venue	Position	Event	Result	Notes
2024	U.S. Paralympic Trials	Miramar, Florida	1st	High jump T63	1.97 m (6 ft 5 1/2 in)	—N/a
2024	U.S. Paralympic Trials	Miramar, Florida	1st	Long jump T63	7.05 m (23 ft 1 1/2 in)	NR
2024	U.S. Paralympic Trials	Miramar, Florida	2nd	100 m T63	12.26 s	—N/a

== Filmography ==
Year	Title	Role	Notes
2016	Kirby Buckets	Sprint Phillips	Episode: Torched
2026	Dancing with the Stars	Himself	Contestant (season 35)
