= Sam Grewe =

American Paralympic high jumper and Physician

Sam Grewe, MD
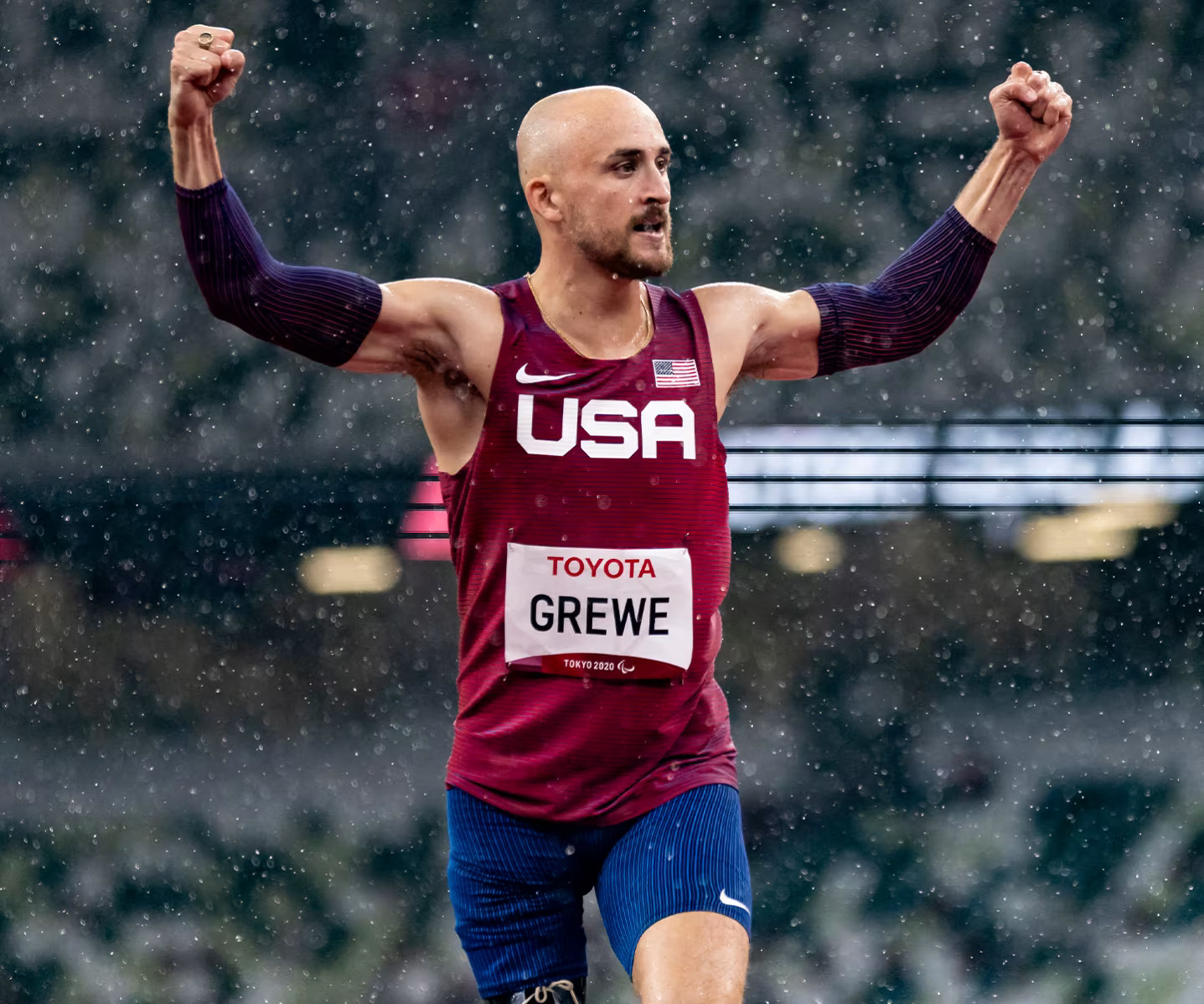

Personal information
- Full name: Samuel Grewe
- Nickname: Sam
- Born: June 10, 1998 (age 28) Goshen, Indiana, U.S.
- Home town: Ann Arbor, Michigan, U.S.
- Height: 6 ft 2 in (188 cm)
- Weight: 170 lb (77 kg)

Sport
- Country: United States
- Sport: Paralympic athletics
- Disability: Osteosarcoma
- Disability class: T63
- Event: High Jump
- Club: Great Lakes Adaptive Sports Association (GLASA), Chicago, Illinois
- Coached by: Kyle Mishler (personal); Jeremy Fischer; Calvin Sullins
Medal record
Paralympic athletics
Representing United States
Paralympic Games
Gold medal – first place	2020 Tokyo	High jump T63
Silver medal – second place	2016 Rio de Janeiro	High jump T42
World Championships
Gold medal – first place	2015 Doha	High jump T42
Gold medal – first place	2017 London	High jump T42
Gold medal – first place	2019 Dubai	High Jump T42
Bronze medal – third place	2024 Kobe	High jump T63
Parapan American Games
Gold medal – first place	2019 Lima	High jump T42-47/T63-64

Samuel Grewe (born June 10, 1998) is an American Paralympic high jumper and physician. Grewe contracted osteosarcoma on Christmas Eve of 2011 at the age of 13 which resulted in the amputation of his right leg via a unique procedure called rotationplasty. Grewe jumped for the University of Notre Dame Track and Field Team, where he studied Pre-Med and resided in Fisher Hall on campus. Grewe graduated from the University of Michigan Medical School in 2025 and now works as a Physical medicine and rehabilitation physician at Spaulding Rehabilitation Hospital in Boston, Massachusetts. Grewe is also a motivational speaker, including a TED Talk that he delivered in February 2022.

== Early life ==
Samuel (Sam) Grewe was born and raised in Middlebury, IN. He was a student in the Middlebury Community Schools system and attended Northridge High School, where he graduated in the class of 2017. During the basketball season of his 7th grade year, he began to experience a sharp pain in his right knee, which he originally attributed to growing pains. However, on Christmas Eve of 2011, the pain in his knee was diagnosed as osteosarcoma. He underwent 21 sessions of chemotherapy to treat the disease. He also chose to have his leg amputated via a rare procedure called rotationplasty. This choice was based on his belief that it would give him the best chance of returning to sports.

== Athletic career ==
Sam began competing in high jump in 2014, two years after losing his leg to cancer. He began his track & field career as a member of the Northridge High School Track & Field team. He quickly found success in this event, earning a spot on the Doha 2015 World Championships team, where he earned his first World Championship title at the age of 17. In the following year, he competed at the 2016 Rio de Janeiro Paralympic Games, where he earned a silver medal. After graduating from high school in 2017, he attended the University of Notre Dame, where he competed on their varsity track & field team. In 2017, Sam won his second World Championship title at the London 2017 World Championships.

After graduating from the University of Notre Dame in 2021, Sam attended the University of Michigan Medical School, where he competed for the University of Michigan Adaptive Sports and Fitness Team. Shortly after, Sam competed at his second Paralympic Games at the Tokyo 2020 Paralympic Games, where he earned a gold medal, jumping a height of 1.86m. Sam returned to athletics in 2024, earning a bronze medal at the World Para Athletics Championships in Kobe, Japan. He later competed in his 3rd Paralympic Games at the Paris 2024 Paralympic Games, where he ended in 8th place.

== Medical career ==
Grewe graduated from the University of Notre Dame in 2021 with a Bachelor of Science degree. He went on to earn his Medical Degree from the University of Michigan Medical School in 2025. He is currently completing his residency in Physical Medicine and Rehabilitation at Spaulding Rehabilitation Hospital in Boston.
