= Jonathan Broom-Edwards =

British Paralympic athlete

Jonathan Broom-Edwards MBE PLY
Personal information
- Nationality: British
- Born: 27 May 1988 (age 38) Colchester, England
- Home town: Loughborough, England
- Height: 1.85 m (6 ft 1 in)
- Weight: 78.5 kg (173 lb)

Sport
- Country: Great Britain
- Sport: Athletics
- Disability: Talipes Equinovarus & Clubbed Foot
- Disability class: T44, T64
- Event: High Jump
- Club: Newham & Essex Beagles
- Coached by: Graham Ravenscroft 2018-22; Bethan Patridge/Miller 2022- Deirdre Elmhirst 2024-

Achievements and titles
- Personal best: 2.15m
Medal record
Men's Paralympic Athletics
Representing Great Britain
Paralympic Games
Gold medal – first place	2020 Tokyo	High jump T64
Silver medal – second place	2016 Rio de Janeiro	High jump T44
World Championships
Gold medal – first place	2024 Kobe	High jump T64
Gold medal – first place	2023 Paris	High jump T64
Gold medal – first place	2019 Dubai	High jump T64
Silver medal – second place	2017 London	High jump T44
Silver medal – second place	2015 Doha	High jump T44
Silver medal – second place	2013 Lyon	High jump T44
Silver medal – second place	2025 New Delhi	High jump T64
European Championships
Silver medal – second place	2014 Swansea	High jump T44
Bronze medal – third place	2016 Grosseto	High jump T42-44

Jonathan Broom-Edwards (born 27 May 1988) is a British para-sport athlete who competes mainly in the T44/T64 classification High Jump. Born with clubbed foot, he was a county level basketball player who found Para-High Jump after 2012.

In 2013 he won his first major international medal with a silver medal at the IPC Athletic World Championship. After navigating a potentially career ending injury in 2018, he turned a string of silvers medals into World Gold in 2019 and turn his 2016 Paralympic Silver into Paralympic Gold in 2021. He is now three times World Champion (2019, 2023, 2024) and Paralympic Champion (2021).

After Tokyo 2020 Paralympic he featured on Channel 4's Celebrity SAS Who Dares Wins.

Broom-Edwards competed at Paris 2024 Paralympics to defend his title. He placed 5th after going against the odds to return from a broken ankle that he experienced 6 weeks out from the games, undergoing surgery a mere 5 and a half weeks before his competition day.

== Personal life ==
Broom-Edwards was born in Colchester in 1988. He was born with congenital talipes equinovarus (clubbed foot) in his left foot which leaves him with muscular dystrophy of his calf muscles as well as fusion and restricted range of motion of his left ankle. He also has problems with his right foot, a weak right knee and a muscular imbalance throughout his body. He matriculated to Loughborough University where he studied aeronautical engineering. Following university, Broom-Edwards became a therapist and now specialises in soft tissue release, gait analysis and postural realignment. On the side, Broom-Edwards is also a motivational speaker.

== Sport career ==
Broom-Edwards was a basketball player as a youth and he played for Loughborough students while at university. A friend suggested that they should try out high jump to help them in their basketball leaps. Initially he competed in athletics competitions at county level and university meets in the high jump, jumping a personal best of 2.03m in 2009.

Although Broom-Edwards understood he had an impairment, he never considered himself as disabled, but after watching the London 2012 Summer Paralympics he realized that he could be eligible to be classified as a para-sport competitor. He was classified in 2013 as a T44 athlete and that year he qualified for the British team with a personal best of 2.06 at the Bedford International Games in May. His first major international competition was at the 2013 IPC Athletics World Championships in Lyon. There he competed in the T42/T44 high jump event where he took silver, losing to world record holder Maciej Lepiato of Poland. The next year Broom-Edwards and Lepiato met at the 2014 IPC Athletics European Championships in Swansea. Despite Broom-Edwards recording a personal best of 2.15, a world record height that would have won gold at the 2012 Paralympics, he was again pushed into second place as Lepiato recorded another new world record of 2.17. After returning from injuries, Broom-Edwards posted another silver medal in the 2015 IPC Athletics World Championships in Dubai. At the 2016 IPC Athletics European Championships in Grosseto, Broom-Edwards was pushed into a Bronze medal position in the mixed class competition due to a change in Razza points system. However, at the 2016 Paralympic Games in Rio de Janeiro, Broom-Edwards achieved a season's best of 2.10m to achieve Silver in his Paralympic debut.

Following a change of coaching set up following the Rio de Janeiro Paralympic games, Broom-Edwards went on to achieve a further Silver medal at the London 2017 IPC World Championships in a close battle with rival Lepiato. Broom-Edwards was struck with injury in 2018 when he ruptured the achilles of his impaired left leg. Following an intense 18 month rehab journey, Broom-Edwards went on to secure his first Gold medal at the 2019 IPC World Championships in Dubai. The 2020 Tokyo Paralympics was postponed to 2021 due to the Covid Pandemic, but it was here that Broom-Edwards made the leap to Paralympic Champion success.

2023 again brought injury with two mamstring tears of Broom-Edwards' jumping leg 8 weeks before the IPC World Championships in Paris. However, he was able to return to form just in time to secure another World Championship Gold, this time sharing the title with Lepiato. When both athletes achieved perfect scorecards in the competition, they opted to mirror the scenario at the Tokyo 2021 Olympics when Barshin and Tamberi decided to settle for the same outcome.

At the 2024 IPC World Championships in Kobe, Japan, Broom-Edwards won outright Gold against a stacked out field, the most impressive turn out for a Paralympic high jump competition since the start of Broom-Edwards' athletic career. Things were gearing up well for the Paralympics in Paris. Broom-Edwards achieved a respectable 4th place at the able bodied British Olympic trials Championships in Manchester. However the biggest challenge to date struck Broom-Edwards 6 weeks before the Paralympic final, when he fell over a hurdle whilst jumping badly, fracturing his ankle, tearing the syndesmosis ligaments and his retinaculum of the ankle. Five and a half weeks after surgery, Broom-Edwards was able to return to jumping form enough to compete at his third Paralympics in Paris, 2024, achieving a respectable 5th Place after the significantly interrupted preparations for the Games.

Broom-Edwards was appointed Member of the Order of the British Empire (MBE) in the 2022 New Year Honours for services to athletics.
