= Abdullah Ilgaz =

Turkish para athlete (born 1998)

Personal information
- Nationality: Turkish
- Born: 24 August 1998 (age 27)

Sport
- Sport: Para-athletics
- Disability class: T47
- Event: high jump
Medal record
Men's para-athletics
Representing Turkey
World Championships
Silver medal – second place	2025 New Delhi	High jump T47
European Championships
Bronze medal – third place	2021 Bydgoszcz	High jump T47
Islamic Solidarity Games
Silver medal – second place	2021 Konya	High jump T46-47

Abdullah Ilgaz (born 24 August 1998) is a Turkish para athlete specializing in high jump. He represented Turkey at the 2024 Summer Paralympics.

== Career ==
In August 2022, Ilgaz competed at the 2021 Islamic Solidarity Games and won a silver medal in the high jump T46-47 event with a jump of 1.87 metres.

He represented Turkey at the 2024 Summer Paralympics and finished in the fourth place in the high jump T47 event with a personal best jump of 1.98 metres. He competed at the 2025 World Para Athletics Championships and won a silver medal in the high jump T47 event with a European record jump of 2.08 metres.
