= Wu Yancong =

Chinese Paralympic athlete

Medal record

Men's para-athletics

Representing China

Paralympic Games
Gold medal – first place	2000 Sydney	High jump F46
Gold medal – first place	2004 Athens	High jump F44/46

Wu Yancong is a paralympic athlete from China competing mainly in category F46 high jump events.

He has competed in three Paralympics, firstly in 2000 where he competed in the triple jump and won the F46 high jump. Four Years later in Athens he defended his high jump title. The 2008 Summer Paralympics in his home country were a relative disappointment as he failed to win a medal in either the long jump or triple jump.
