= Mariyappan Thangavelu =

Indian Paralympic high jumper and Paralympic medalist

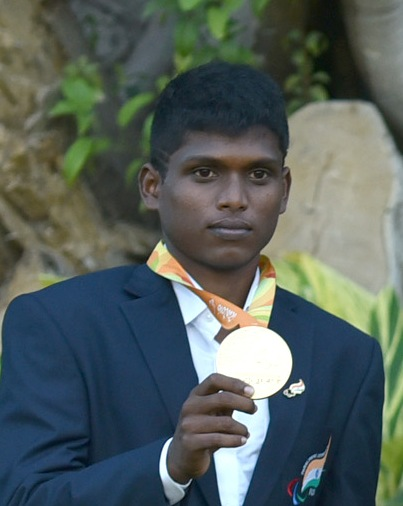
- Mariyappan at the 2016 Summer Paralympics

Personal information
- Full name: Mariyappan Thangavelu
- Born: 28 June 1995 (age 31) Periavadagampatti, Salem district, Tamil Nadu, India

Sport
- Country: India
- Sport: Athletics
- Events: High Jump: T42 &T63

Achievements and titles
- Paralympic finals: 2016 Summer Paralympics: High Jump (T42) – Gold & 2020 Summer Paralympics: High Jump (T63) – Silver
Medal record
Representing India
Men's athletics
Paralympic Games
| Gold medal – first place | 2016 Rio | High Jump T42 |
| Silver medal – second place | 2020 Tokyo | High Jump T63 |
| Bronze medal – third place | 2024 Paris | High Jump T63 |
World Championships
| Gold medal – first place | 2024 Kobe | High jump T63 |
| Bronze medal – third place | 2019 Dubai | High jump T63 |
Asian Para Games
| Silver medal – second place | 2022 Hangzhou | High jump T63 |

Mariyappan Thangavelu (born 28 June 1995) is an Indian Paralympic high jumper. He is a triple Paralympics medalist having won the gold medal at 2016 Rio, the silver medal at 2020 Tokyo and the bronze medal at 2024 Paris. He has also been a double medalist at the World Championships with one gold and one bronze. Additionally, he is an Asian Para Games silver medalist.

On 25 January 2017, the Government of India conferred him with the Padma Shri award for his contribution towards sports and in the same year, he was also awarded the Arjuna Award. He was awarded with the Major Dhyan Chand Khel Ratna in 2020.

== Early life ==
Mariyappan was born in Periavadagampatti village, Salem district, Tamil Nadu, one of six children (four brothers and a sister). His father reportedly abandoned the family early on and his mother, Saroja, raised her children as a single mother, carrying bricks as a labourer until becoming a vegetable seller, earning ₹100 (US$1.00) a day. At the age of five, Mariyappan suffered permanent disability in his right leg when he was run over by a drunk bus driver while walking to school. The bus crushed his leg below the knee, causing it to become stunted. Despite this setback, he completed secondary schooling. He says that he didn't see himself as different from able-bodied kids.

== Athletic career ==
Mariyappan enjoyed playing volleyball as a student; subsequently, his school physical education instructor encouraged him to try high jumping. In his first competitive event, aged 14, he placed second among a field of able-bodied competitors, after which he received strong encouragement from his classmates and others in Salem district. In 2013, his current coach Satyanarayana, supported by the Sports Academy of India for the Differently-Abled, first noticed his performance at the Indian national para-athletics championships, and formally took him on as a student in 2015, bringing him to Bengaluru for further coaching.

In March 2016, Mariyappan cleared a distance of 1.78 m (5 ft 10 in) in the men's T-42 high jump event at the IPC Grand Prix in Tunisia, qualifying him for the 2016 Summer Paralympics. In Rio, he won the gold medal, again in the T-42 category, with a jump of 1.89 m (6 ft 2 in).

In November 2019, he cleared a distance of 1.80 m (5 ft 11 in) min the Men's T-63 high jump event at the 2019 World Para Athletics Championships in Dubai to win the bronze medal, behind fellow Indian Sharad Kumar.

In August 2021, he won the silver medal in men's T-63 high jump event at the 2020 Summer Paralympics, which was the second medal in his Paralympic career.

== Awards and recognition ==
- Padma Shri (2017) - fourth highest Indian national honour
- Arjuna Award (2017) - second highest Indian sporting honour, including a cash award of ₹5 lakh (US$5,200)
- ₹2 crore (US$210,000) from the Government of Tamil Nadu
- ₹75 lakh (US$78,000) from the Ministry of Youth Affairs and Sports
- ₹50 lakh (US$52,000) from the Government of Madhya Pradesh
- ₹30 lakh (US$31,000) from the Ministry of Social Justice and Empowerment
- ₹15 lakh (US$16,000) from fund established by Sachin Tendulkar, various corporations.
- ₹10 lakh (US$10,000) from Yash Raj Films
- ₹10 lakh (US$10,000) from the Delhi Golf Club
- ₹5 lakh (US$5,200) from NRI businessman Mukkattu Sebastian
- Major Dhyan Chand Khel Ratna (2020) - highest sporting honour of India.

== Personal life ==
Mariyappan has an elder sister Sudha and two younger brothers Kumar and Gopi. In 2015, he completed a bachelor's degree in business administration.

Following his Paralympic triumph, Mariyappan used some of his prize money to buy his mother a paddy field, so his family could enjoy a more stable source of income, and also used his winnings to build a better house for his family, depositing the remaining sums in an account. In August 2017, Mariyappan said that while it was "a good feeling" to be recognised and to have his neighbours treat him with great respect, he felt "a slight sadness" that even his friends now treated him with increased formality, which irritated him. In a separate interview that month, he said that though he remained committed to an athletic career, he had been living off his prize money, and was in desperate need of a steady job to support his family. He said he had requested help from the Tamil Nadu government, but had not received a reply.

In October 2018, he was named as the flag bearer for the 2018 Asian Para Games held in Jakarta that month. On 7 December, he was offered a Group A post as a coach with the Sports Authority of India.

A petition to implead T Mariappan, recipient of gold medal in Para-Olympics competitions held recently, in a youth's death case, has been filed in the Madras High Court. According to the petitioner, her son Sathish Kumar (19) faced the wrath of Mariappan for dashing his two-wheeler against the latter's new Mahindra car on 3 June last. He was beaten up by Mariappan and his friends Sabari and Yuvaraj. When they snatched his mobile phone, Sathish Kumar ran behind them to get it back. Since then he was missing. However, he was found dead near the railway track the next day. She lodged a complaint with local police on the death of her son and also sought protection. As there was no effective action, she filed the present. Police has investigated the issue and dismissed the involvement of Mariyappan from this case.
