= Roderick Townsend-Roberts =

American Paralympic athlete

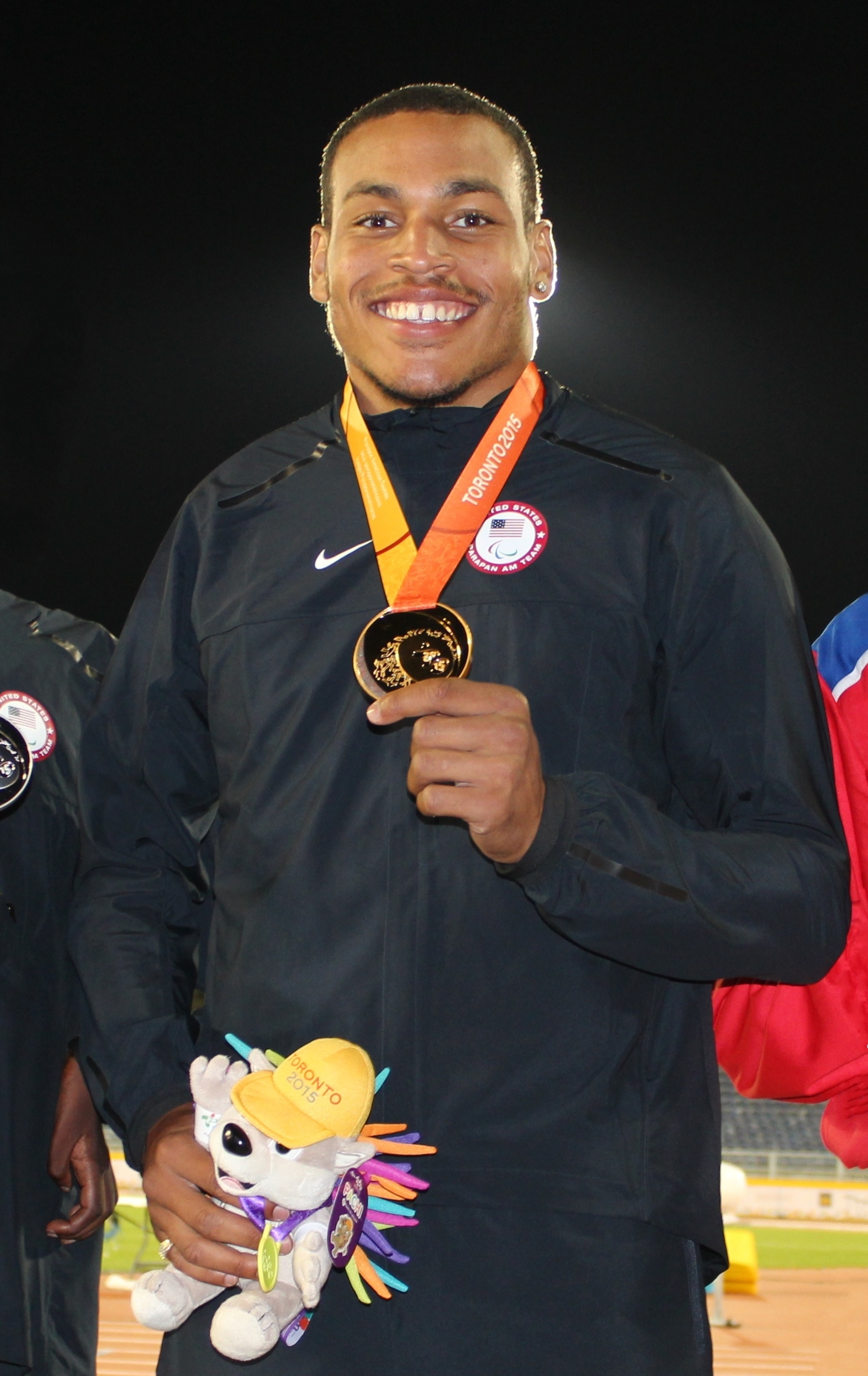
- Townsend-Roberts at the 2015 Parapan American Games

Personal information
- Born: July 1, 1992 (age 34) Stockton, California, U.S.
- Height: 6 ft 7 in (201 cm)
- Weight: 210 lb (95 kg)

Sport
- Sport: Paralympic athletics
- Disability class: T46/47/F46/47
- Event(s): Sprint, long jump, high jump, triple jump
Medal record
Representing the United States
Paralympic Games
| Gold medal – first place | 2016 Rio de Janeiro | Long jump T47 |
| Gold medal – first place | 2016 Rio de Janeiro | High jump T47 |
| Gold medal – first place | 2020 Tokyo | High jump T47 |
| Gold medal – first place | 2024 Paris | High jump T47 |
| Silver medal – second place | 2020 Tokyo | Long jump T47 |
World Championships
| Gold medal – first place | 2015 Doha | High jump T47 |
| Gold medal – first place | 2017 London | High jump T47 |
| Gold medal – first place | 2019 Dubai | High jump T47 |
| Gold medal – first place | 2023 Paris | High jump T47 |
| Gold medal – first place | 2024 Kobe | High jump T47 |
| Silver medal – second place | 2015 Doha | Long jump T47 |
| Silver medal – second place | 2015 Doha | Triple jump T47 |
| Silver medal – second place | 2015 Doha | 4×100 m T42-47 |
| Silver medal – second place | 2023 Paris | Long jump T47 |
| Bronze medal – third place | 2025 New Delhi | High jump T47 |
Parapan American Games
| Gold medal – first place | 2015 Toronto | High jump T42/44/47 |
| Gold medal – first place | 2015 Toronto | Long jump T47 |

Roderick Townsend-Roberts (born July 1, 1992) is an American Paralympic athlete. At the 2020 Summer Paralympics he set a high jump world record (2.15 m) and won gold in high jump, silver in long jump.

== Career ==
He won the long jump and high jump events at the 2016 Rio Paralympics and 2015 Parapan American Games. In 2015 he set two world records (2.07 and 2.12 m) and won the world title in the high jump in his disability class. Townsend-Roberts cleared 2.14 m (7 ft 1/4 in) at the 2019 Mt. SAC Relays to take his world record over 7 feet.

Townsend-Roberts sustained permanent nerve damage to his right arm and shoulder at birth. He played football for two years at Lincoln High School in Stockton, California, and served as the team captain in 2009. He has a degree in communications from Boise State University and used to work as an athletics coach at Northern Arizona University. He currently lives in Kentucky with his wife Tynita Butts.
