= Praveen Kumar (para-athlete, born 2003) =

Indian Paralympic High Jumper

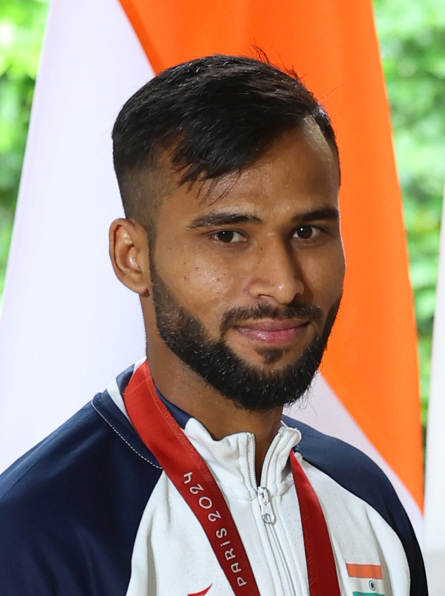
- Kumar in 2024

Personal information
- Born: 15 May 2003 (age 23) Govindgarh, Uttar Pradesh, India
- Education: Motilal Nehru College

Sport
- Sport: Para-athletics
- Disability class: T64
- Event: High jump
- Coached by: Dr Satyapal Singh
Medal record
Men's para-athletics
Representing India
Paralympic Games
Gold medal – first place	2024 Paris	High Jump T64
Silver medal – second place	2020 Tokyo	High Jump T64
World Championships
Bronze medal – third place	2025 New Delhi	High jump T64
Asian Para Games
Gold medal – first place	2022 Hangzhou	High Jump T64

Praveen Kumar (born 15 May 2003) is an Indian para high jumper. He won gold medal at the 2024 Paris Paralympics and silver medal at the 2020 Tokyo Paralympics. He is also a 2022 Asian Para Games gold medalist.

== Early life and education ==
Kumar is from Govindgarh village, Jewar tehsil, Gautam Budh Nagar district, Uttar Pradesh. He studied at Pragyan Public School, Jewar till Class 12. He did his graduation at Motilal Nehru College. He is supported by Olympic Gold Quest, a sports NGO.

== Career ==
P. Kumar won the gold medal in the 2024 Summer Paralympics and silver medal in the men's high jump T64 event at the 2020 Summer Paralympics.

In 2023, he won the men's high jump T64 at the 2022 Asian Para Games at Hangzhou, China on 23 October 2023. He also broke the Games' record of 2.02m in the final.

== See also ==
- India at the 2020 Summer Paralympics
- India at the 2024 Summer Paralympics
