= Jeff Skiba =

American Paralympic athlete (born 1984)

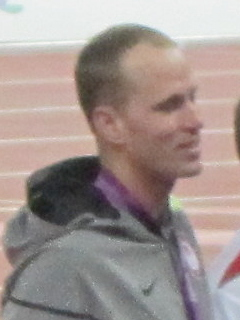
- Men's High Jump F46 Victory Ceremony 2012

Personal information
- Nationality: American
- Born: April 28, 1984 (age 42) San Jose, California

Sport
- Sport: Running
- Events: 100m, 200m, High Jump & Long Jump
Medal record
Track and field
Representing United States
Paralympic Games
Gold medal – first place	2008 Beijing	High jump F44–46
Silver medal – second place	2004 Athens	High jump F44–46
Silver medal – second place	2008 Beijing	Pentathlon P44
Silver medal – second place	2012 London	High jump F46
IPC Athletics World Championships
Gold medal – first place	2002 Lille	High jump F44
Gold medal – first place	2006 Assen	High jump F44/46
Bronze medal – third place	2006 Assen	Discus throw F44
Bronze medal – third place	2011 Christchurch	High jump F46
Bronze medal – third place	2015 Doha	High jump – T44
Parapan American Games
Bronze medal – third place	2015 Toronto	Javelin throw F44

Jeff Skiba (born April 28, 1984) is a police officer and a Paralympic athlete from the United States competing mainly in category P44 pentathlon events.

Jeff competed in the 2008 Summer Paralympics in Beijing, China. There he won a gold medal in the men's high jump – P44 event, a silver medal in the men's pentathlon – P44 event, finished fifth in the men's javelin – F42/44 event, finished sixth in the men's discus throw – F44 event and finished ninth in the men's Long jump – F42/44 event

== Major Achievements ==
  - 2008: Gold medal, F44/F46 High Jump; silver medal, P44 Pentathlon – Paralympic Games, Beijing, China
  - 2008: Unofficial world record, high jump (2.15m) – Azusa Pacific Invitational, Los Angeles, California
  - 2007: World record, high jump (2.10m) – U.S. Paralympics Track and Field National Championships, Atlanta, Ga.
  - 2007: First Paralympic athlete to compete at U.S. Indoor Track and Field National Championships
  - 2006: Gold medal, high jump; Fourth place, long jump – IPC World Championships, Assen, The Netherlands
  - 2006: Gold medal, pentathlon -U.S. Paralympics Track & Field National Championships, Atlanta, Ga.
  - 2004: Silver medal, high jump -Paralympic Games, Athens, Greece
  - 2002: Gold medal, high jump – IPC Athletics World Championships, Lille, France
  - 2002: First place, high jump – International Challenge Track and Field Meet
  - 2002: First place, high jump – Washington State High School Track & Field Championships
