= Reinhold Bötzel =

German Paralympic athlete

Medal record

Paralympic athletics

Representing Germany

Paralympic Games
Bronze medal – third place	2000 Sydney	4x100 metre relay - T46

European Championships
Gold medal – first place	2014 Swansea	High jump - T47
Silver medal – second place	2016 Grosseto	High jump - T47

Reinhold Bötzel (born 8 December 1975) is a paralympic athlete from Germany competing mainly in category F46 high jump and long jump events.

== Biography ==
Despite competing in the high jump and long jump events at both the 2000 and 2004 Summer Paralympics it was as part of the German 4 × 100 m rely team in the T46 class in 2000 that Reinhold won his only Paralympic medal, a bronze.
