= Aaron Chatman =

Australian Paralympic athlete

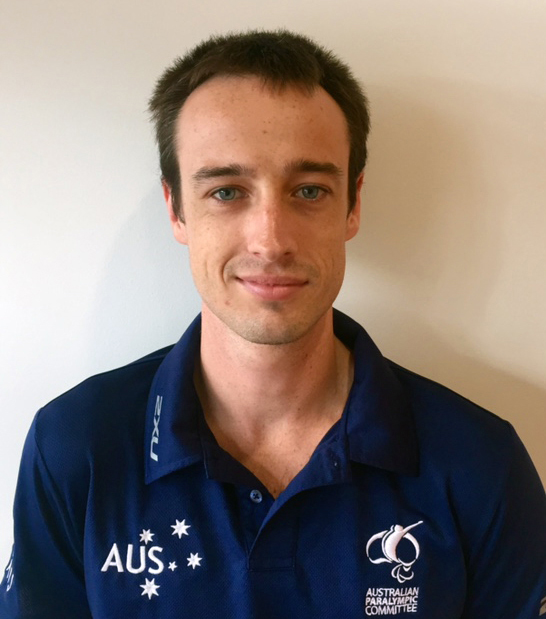
- 2016 Australian Paralympic team portrait

Personal information
- Born: 11 May 1987 (age 39)
Medal record
Track and field (T46)
Representing Australia
Paralympic Games
Silver medal – second place	2008 Beijing	Men's High Jump F44/46
Bronze medal – third place	2008 Beijing	Men's 4x100m Relay T42–T46
Bronze medal – third place	2016 Rio	Men's High Jump T45-47
IPC Athletics World Championships
Silver medal – second place	2006 Assen	Men's High Jump F44/46
Silver medal – second place	2017 London	High jump - T47

Aaron Chatman (born 11 May 1987) is an Australian right arm amputee Paralympic athlete competing in class T47 men's high jump, long jump and 100 m. He has won silver and bronze medals at the Summer Paralympics.

== Athletics ==
At the 2006 IPC Athletics World Championships in Assen, he won a silver medal in the men's high jump F44/46. In 2007, he broke the world high jump record F44/46 with a jump of 2.05m at the 2007 ACT Championships.

He competed in the 2008 Summer Paralympics in Beijing, China. There he won a silver medal in the men's high jump F44/46 event where he cleared 2.02m and a bronze medal in the men's 4 × 100 m relay T42–46 event. He was coached by Irina Dvoskina. He nearly missed competing due to chicken pox keeping him isolated in Hong Kong prior to the Games.

He returned to competition at the 2016 Rio Paralympics where he won the bronze medal in the Men's High Jump T45-47 with a jump of 1.99m.

At the 2017 World Para Athletics Championships in London, England, he won a silver medal in the Men's High Jump T47 with a jump of 1.94 m and ewas coached by Gary Bourne. Chatman finished fifth in the Men's High Jump T47 at the 2017 World Para Athletics Championships in Dubai with a jump of 1.87m.

He was an Australian Institute of Sport scholarship holder coached by Irina Dvoskina. He announced his retirement in November 2020 after experiencing complications with a chronic injury.
