= Rampal Chahar =

Indian para high jumper

Personal information
- Nickname: Ram Pal
- Nationality: Indian
- Born: 10 July 1989 (age 37) Haryana, India

Sport
- Country: India
- Sport: Para Athletics
- Disability: Amputation
- Disability class: T47
- Event: High Jump
Medal record
Track and Field
Representing India
Asian Para Games
Silver medal – second place	2018 Jakarta	High jump T45/46/47
Silver medal – second place	2022 Hangzhou	High jump T47

Rampal Chahar (born 10 July 1989) is an Indian Paralympic athlete from Haryana, who competes in the men’s high jump. He represented India at the 2016 Rio Paralympics and 2020 Tokyo paralympics where he stood 6th and 5th respectively. He qualified to represent India at the 2024 Summer Paralympics at Paris, his third Olympics.

== Early life ==
Rampal Chahar was born in Jajjhar, Haryana. When he was 4 years old, his arm got caught in an agricultural chopper and it resulted in partial amputation of the right arm. He currently holds the gold medal in high jump in 2016 IPC Grand Prix that took place in Tunisia.

== Career ==
Chahar is a national record holder in T47 para high jump event. He won gold at IPC Athletics Grand Prix in Tunisia 2016 and has won 5 national-level gold medals.

Chahar finished 6th in his event at the 2016 Rio Paralympics. Rampal Chahar finished 6th in his event at 2017 London World Para Championships. Rampal Chahar clinched silver medal in High Jump T47 Category at Asian Para Games at Jakarta, Indonesia.
