= Chen Hongjie =

Chinese Paralympic athlete

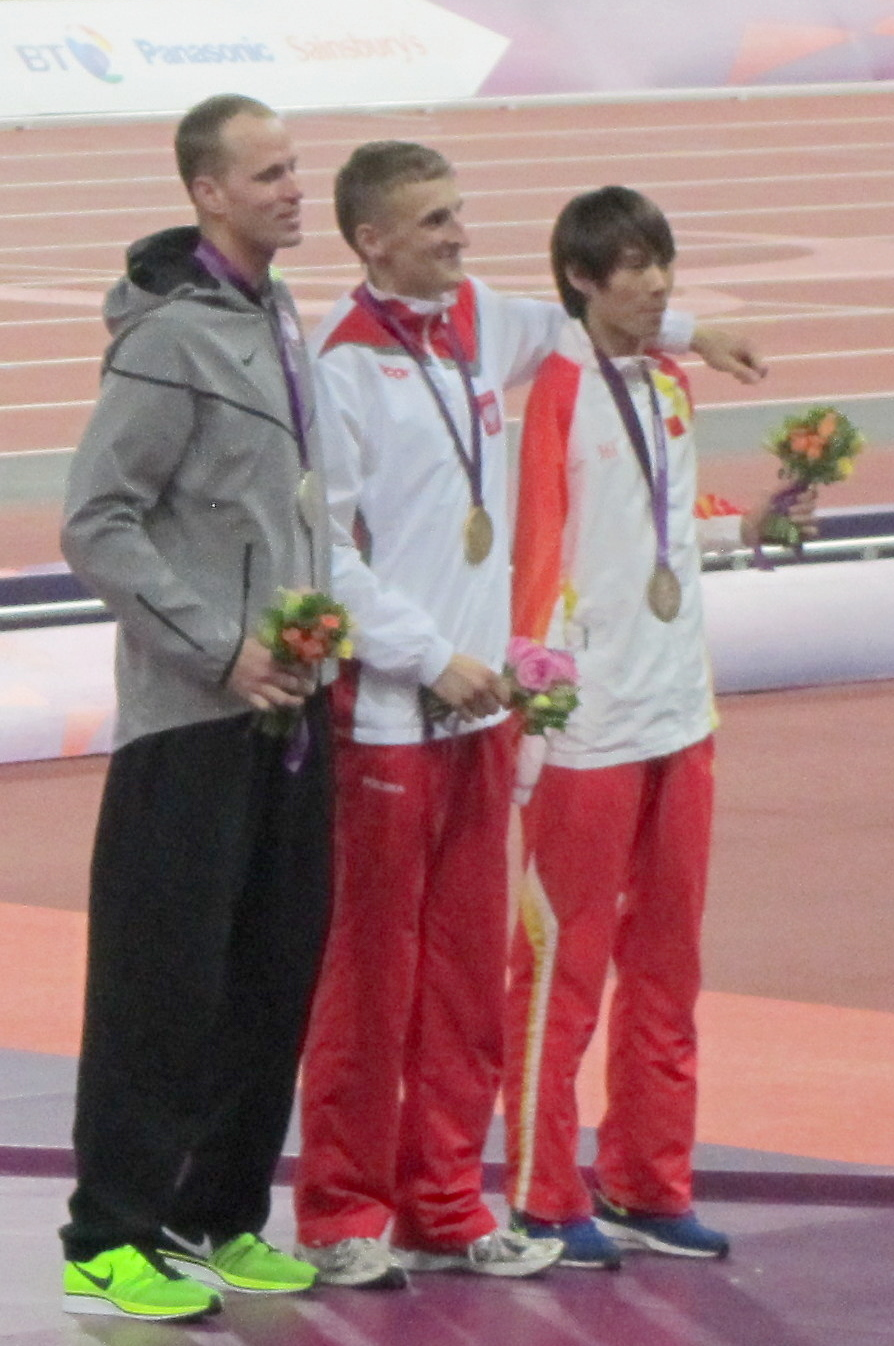
- Chen (right) at his 2012 Paralympics victory ceremony.

Personal information
- Nationality: Chinese
- Born: 14 February 1990 (age 36) Xiamen, China
- Height: 1.79 m (5 ft 10 1/2 in)

Sport
- Country: China
- Sport: high jump
- Disability class: F46
- Club: Fujian Province: Xiamen
- Coached by: Hao Zhiqiang
Medal record
Paralympic athletics
Representing China
Paralympic Games
Silver medal – second place	2016 Rio de Janeiro	High jump T47
Bronze medal – third place	2008 Beijing	High jump F44/46
Bronze medal – third place	2012 London	High jump F46
World Championships
Bronze medal – third place	2017 London	High jump T47
Asian Para Games
Gold medal – first place	2010 Guangzhou	High jump F46
Silver medal – second place	2018 Jakarta	High jump T45/46/47
Silver medal – second place	2022 Hangzhou	High jump T47

Chen Hongjie (born 14 February 1990) is a Chinese Paralympic track and field athlete competing mainly in category T46 track and field events.

== Career ==
He competed in the 2008 Summer Paralympics in Beijing, China. There he won a bronze medal in the men's High jump - F44/46 event. Four years later he repeated the feat with another bronze medal at the 2012 Summer Paralympics in London.
