= Georgii Margiev =

Georgian-Russian para-athlete

Personal information
- Native name: Георгий Маргиев
- Born: 22 December 1994 (age 31) Georgia

Sport
- Sport: Para-athletics
- Disability class: T47
- Event: Long jump
Medal record
Para-athletics
Representing Neutral Paralympic Athletes
Paralympic Games
Bronze medal – third place	2024 Paris	High jump T47

Georgii Margiev (Russian: Георгий Маргиев; born 22 December 1994) is a Georgian-Russian para-athlete who specializes in the high jump. He competed at the 2024 Summer Paralympics and won a bronze medal in the men's high jump T47 event.
