= Maciej Lepiato =

Polish Paralympic athlete (born 1988)

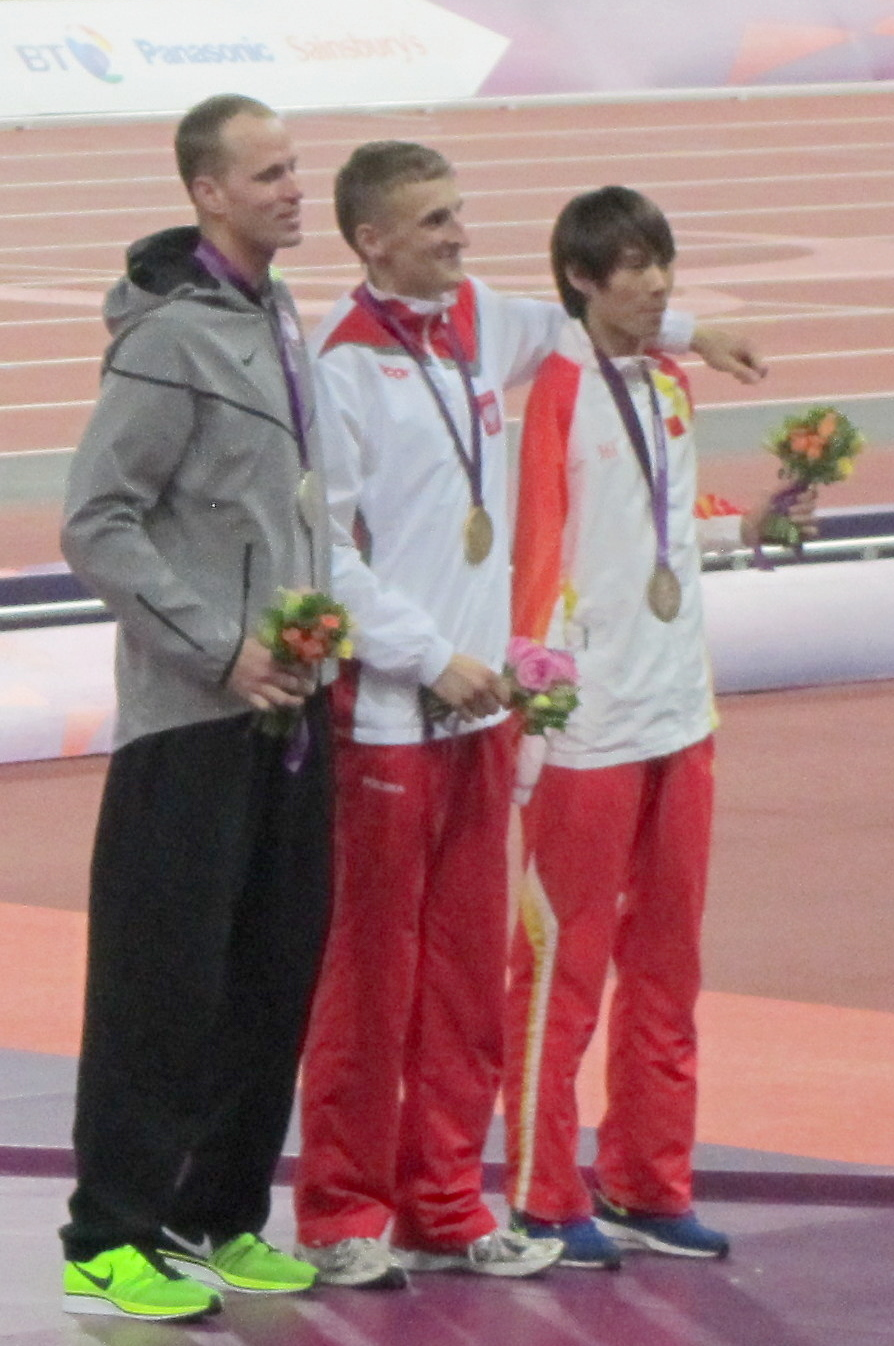
- Lepiato (centre) at his 2012 Paralympics podium ceremony

Personal information
- Nationality: Polish
- Born: 18 August 1988 (age 37) Poznań, Poland
- Height: 1.85 m (6 ft 1 in)

Sport
- Country: Poland
- Sport: high jump
- Disability class: T44
- Club: START Gorzów Wielkopolski
- Coached by: Zbigniew Lewkowicz

Achievements and titles
- Personal best: 2.19 m (7 ft 2 in)
Medal record
Men's athletics
Representing Poland
Summer Paralympics
Gold medal – first place	2012 London	High jump – T44
Gold medal – first place	2016 Rio	High jump – T44
Bronze medal – third place	2020 Tokyo	High jump – T64
Bronze medal – third place	2024 Paris	High jump – T64
World Championships
Gold medal – first place	2011 Christchurch	High jump – T44
Gold medal – first place	2013 Lyon	High jump – T44
Gold medal – first place	2015 Doha	High jump – T44
Bronze medal – third place	2024 Kobe	High jump – T64
European Championships
Gold medal – first place	2014 Swansea	High jump – T44
Silver medal – second place	2016 Grosseto	High jump – T42–44

Maciej Lepiato (born 18 August 1988 in Poznań) is a Polish Paralympic athlete who was born with a disability affecting his left leg. He took up the sport in 2010 and trains in both high jump and long jump. He won gold in men's high jump – F46 at the 2012 and 2016 Summer Paralympics.
