= Łukasz Mamczarz =

Polish Paralympic athlete (born 1988)

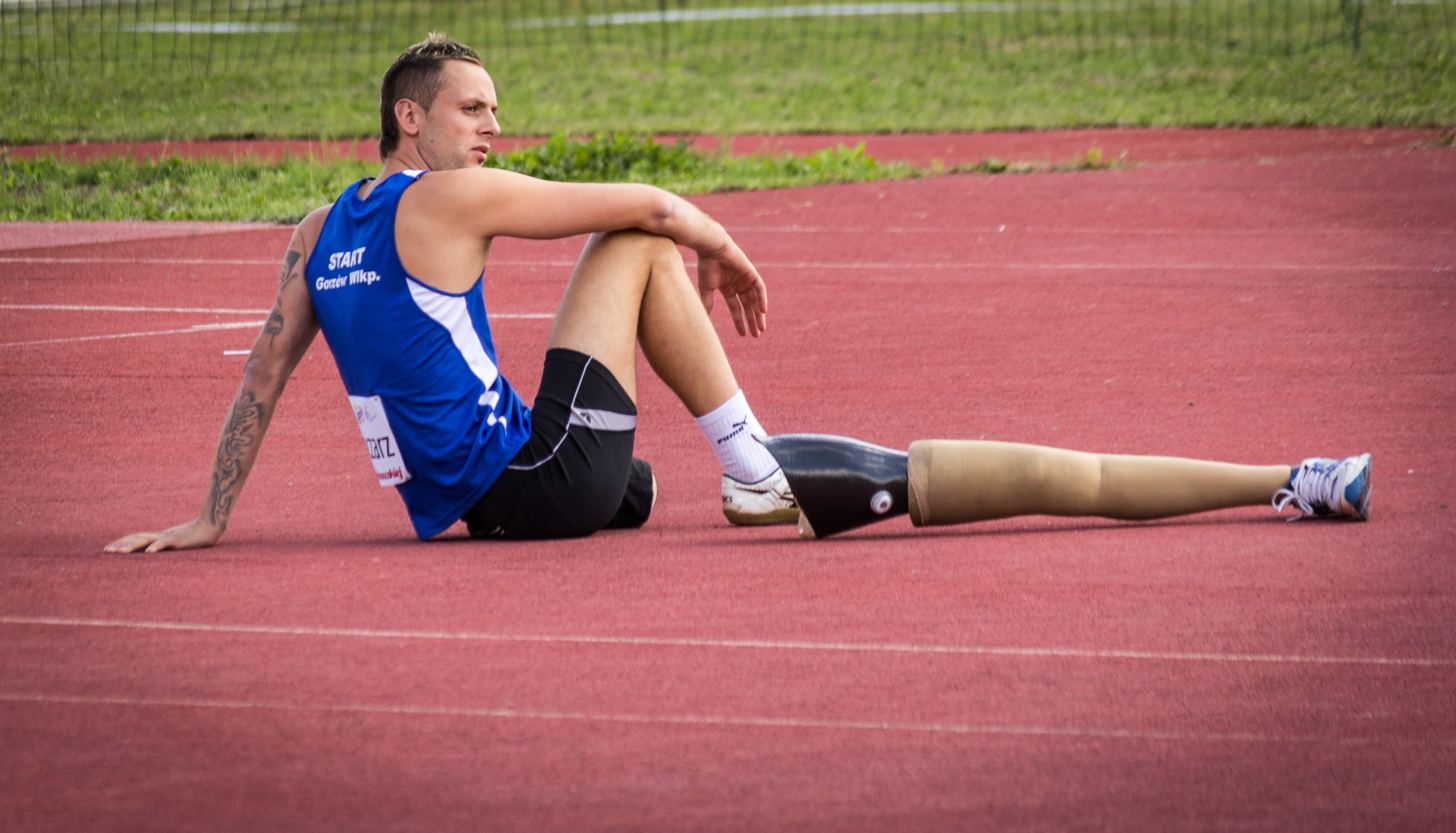
- Łukasz Mamczarz at the Memoriał Kamili Skolimowskiej in 2013

Personal information
- Full name: Łukasz Maciej Mamczarz
- Nationality: Polish
- Born: 14 June 1988 (age 38) Gorzów Wielkopolski, Poland
- Height: 1.93 m (6 ft 4 in)

Sport
- Country: Poland
- Sport: high jump
- Disability class: F42
- Club: START Gorzów Wielkopolski
- Coached by: Zbigniew Lewkowicz
Medal record
Men's athletics
Representing Poland
Summer Paralympics
Bronze medal – third place	2012 London	High jump – T42
World Championships
Bronze medal – third place	2013 Lyon	High jump – T42
Bronze medal – third place	2015 Doha	High jump – T42
Bronze medal – third place	2023 Paris	High jump – T63
European Championships
Gold medal – first place	2014 Swansea	High jump – T42
Gold medal – first place	2016 Grosseto	High jump – T42–44

Łukasz Maciej Mamczarz (born 14 June 1988) is a Polish Paralympic athlete who competes in F42 classification high jump events.

== Athletics career ==
Mamczarz represented his country at the 2012 Summer Paralympics in London where he won a bronze medal in the high jump (T42). More medals followed in the IPC Athletics World Championships with a pair of bronze medals won in the high jump in 2013 in Lyon and 2015 in Doha. Mamczarz is also a double European Championships gold medalist, winning his event in both Swansea (2014) and Grosseto (2016).

== Personal life ==
Mamczarz was born in Gorzów Wielkopolski, Poland in 1988. In 2009 he lost his left leg in a motorcycle accident. He took up sport after a recommendation by his doctors during his rehabilitation.
