= Sharad Kumar (athlete) =

Indian Paralympic high jumper (born 1992)

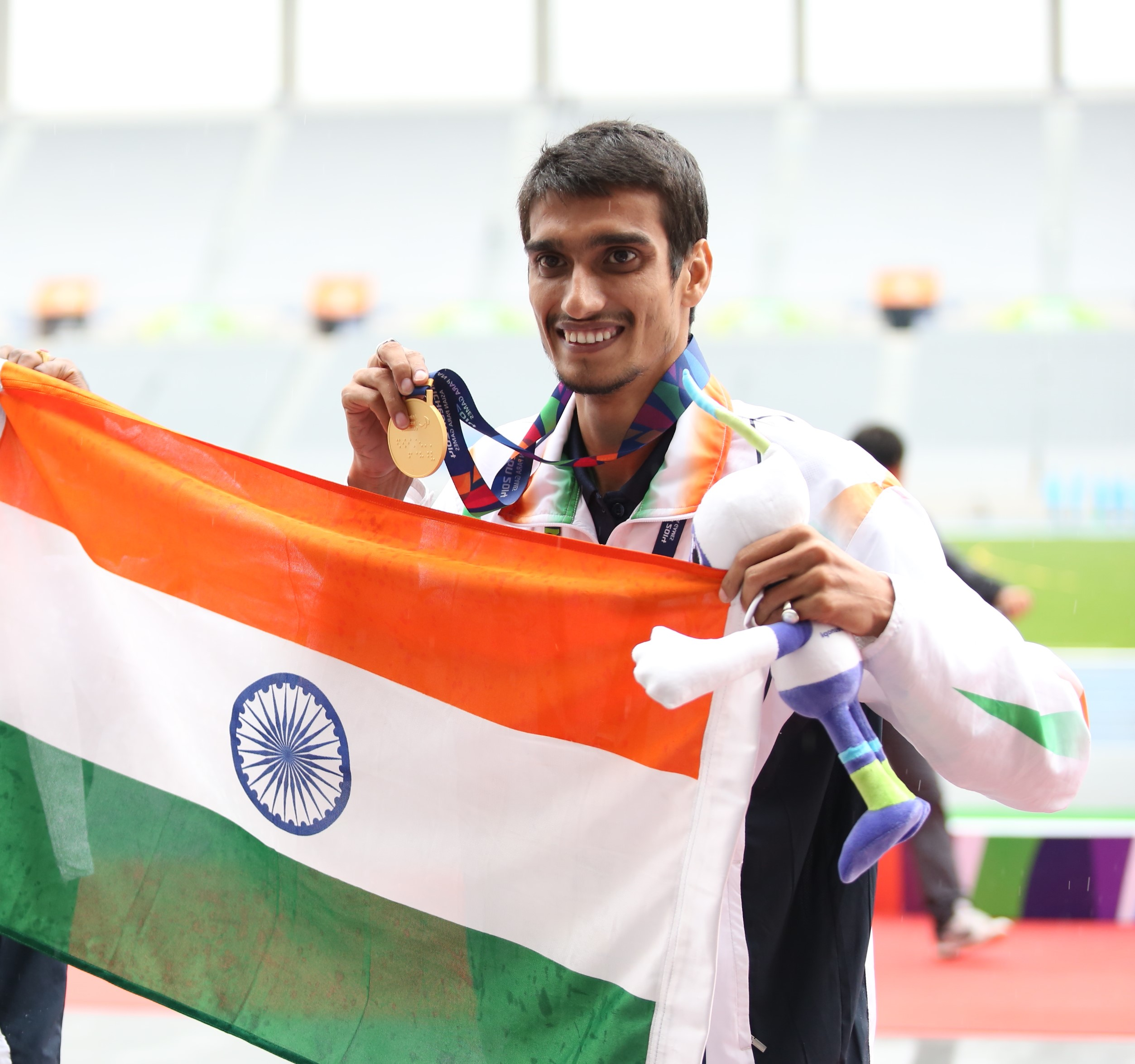
- Kumar at the 2014 Asian Para Games

Personal information
- National team: India
- Born: 1 March 1992 (age 34) Muzaffarpur, Bihar, India
- Education: Political Science; International Relations; St. Paul's School; Modern School; Kirori Mal College; Jawaharlal Nehru University
- Occupation: Athlete /Coach (Sports Authority of India )
- Years active: 2010–present
- Height: 1.81 m (5 ft 11 in)
- Weight: 58 kg (128 lb)

Sport
- Sport: High Jump
- Disability: Impaired muscle power
- Disability class: T42
- Rank: 1 (as of September 2018)
- Tokyo Paralympics 2020: High Jump T42

Achievements and titles
- Paralympic finals: 3rd
- Highest world ranking: 1
Medal record
Track and field (para high jump)
Representing India
Men's athletics
Paralympic Games
Silver medal – second place	2024 Paris	High Jump T63
Bronze medal – third place	2020 Tokyo	High Jump T63
Asian Para Games
Gold medal – first place	2014 Incheon	F42
Gold medal – first place	2018 Jakarta	T42/63
IPC World Championships
Silver medal – second place	2017 London	T42

Sharad Kumar (born 1 March 1992) is an Indian para high jumper and a former world no. 1. He qualified to represent India at the 2024 Summer Paralympics in Paris.

Kumar represented India at the 2016 Summer Paralympics and finished sixth. He won Silver in 2017 World ParaAthletics Championships.

He then went on to represent India in the 2020 Tokyo Paralympics where he won bronze medal. He also represented India in the 2024 Paris Paralympics where he won a silver medal.

== Early life and background ==
Sharad Kumar was born on 1 March 1992 in motipur Muzaffarpur, Bihar. At the age of two, he suffered paralysis of his left leg after taking spurious polio medicine at a local eradication drive. Sharad studied at St. Paul's School (Darjeeling) where he started high jump in Class 7. He broke school and district records competing against able-bodied athletes. For further studies, he moved to Delhi, where he studied his Plus Two at Modern School and graduated in political science from Kirori Mal College. Post Graduation in Politics with Specialization in International relations from Jawaharlal Nehru University. He is supported by GoSports Foundation through the Para Champions Programme.

== Career ==
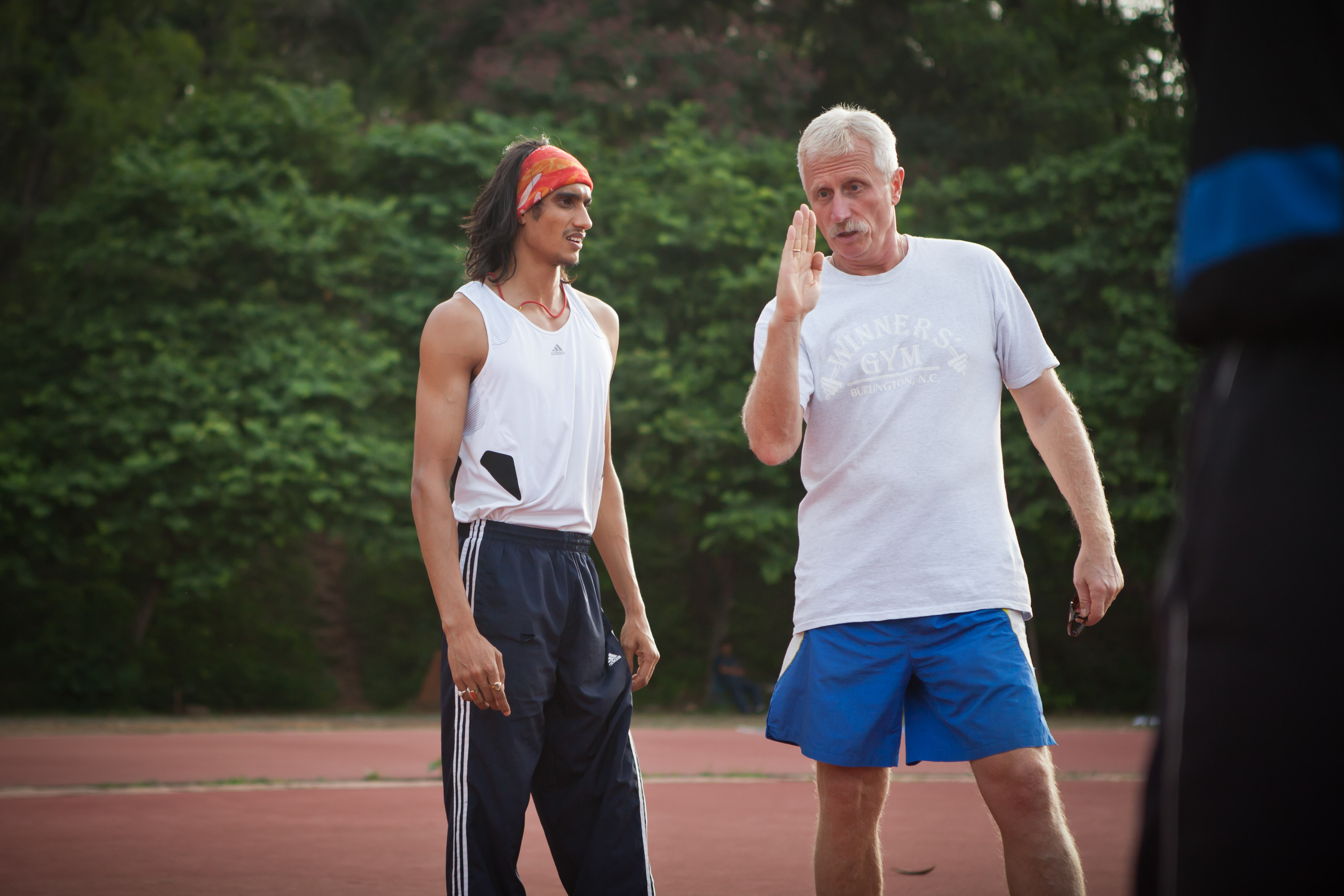
Para High-Jumper Sharad Kumar is training at SAI, Bangalore. National High-Jump Coach Nikitan uffgan has been giving important tips to Sharad, a probable for 2012 London Paralympic games.

Sharad made his international debut in 2010 at the Asian Para Games in Guangzhou. In January 2012, he jumped 1.64m, thus qualifying for the 2012 Paralympics. In April 2012, with a jump of 1.75m at the Malaysian Open Para athletics championship, he became world no. 1 at the age of 19.

However he missed the London Paralympics after testing positive for a banned drug. He made his comeback in the 2014 Asian Para Games, where he won gold by clearing 1.80m, breaking a 12-year Asian Games record and also regained the World No. 1 spot. He participated in the Rio Paralympics 2016, finishing at sixth position with a best of 1.77m. He started training under Mr. Satyanarayana, National Para Athletics Coach since March 2015. He won Silver in 2017 World ParaAthletics Championships with a jump of 1.84m. He won gold medal in 2018 Para Asían Games Jakarta setting a new Game Record and Continental Record by jumping 1.90m.

Training in Ukraine since 2017, under TOPS (Target Olympic Podium Scheme, government of India )
