= Swimming at the 2004 Summer Paralympics – Men's 50 metre freestyle S3 =

Men's 50m Freestyle S3 at the XII Paralympic Games
- Paralympic Swimming
- Venue: Olympic Aquatic Centre
- Dates: 25 September 2004
- Competitors: 13 from 11 nations
- Winning time: 45.65

Medalists
1st place, gold medalist(s)		Martin Kovar	Czech Republic
2nd place, silver medalist(s)		Du Jian Ping	China
3rd place, bronze medalist(s)		Jaime Eulert	Peru

The Men's 50 metre freestyle S3 swimming event at the 2004 Summer Paralympics was competed on 25 September. It was won by Martin Kovar, representing Czech Republic.

== 1st round ==
Qualified for final round

Heat 1

25 Sept. 2004, morning session

Rank	Athlete	Time	Notes
1	Jaime Eulert (PER)	49.98	
2	Albert Bakaev (RUS)	54.15	
3	Ioannis Kostakis (GRE)	55.42	
4	Genezi Andrade (BRA)	59.19	
5	Samuel Soler (ESP)	1:03.96	
6	Cristopher Tronco (MEX)	1:06.01	

Heat 2

25 Sept. 2004, morning session

Rank	Athlete	Time	Notes
1	Martin Kovar (CZE)	47.04	PR
2	Du Jian Ping (CHN)	48.81	
3	Carlo Piccoli (ITA)	53.13	
4	Kenneth Cairns (GBR)	55.09	
5	Andrzej Ziembowski (POL)	58.16	
6	Oliver Deniz (ESP)	1:03.06	
7	Carlos Molina (ESP)	1:25.43	

== Final round ==
25 Sept. 2004, evening session

Rank	Athlete	Time	Notes
1st place, gold medalist(s)	Martin Kovar (CZE)	45.65	WR
2nd place, silver medalist(s)	Du Jian Ping (CHN)	49.78	
3rd place, bronze medalist(s)	Jaime Eulert (PER)	50.22	
4	Albert Bakaev (RUS)	54.02	
5	Carlo Piccoli (ITA)	54.15	
6	Kenneth Cairns (GBR)	54.18	
7	Ioannis Kostakis (GRE)	54.40	
8	Andrzej Ziembowski (POL)	58.60	
