= Swimming at the 2004 Summer Paralympics – Men's 100 metre freestyle S3 =

Men's 100m Freestyle S3 at the XII Paralympic Games
- Paralympic Swimming
- Venue: Olympic Aquatic Centre
- Dates: 19 September 2004
- Competitors: 13 from 11 nations
- Winning time: 1:43.51

Medalists
1st place, gold medalist(s)		Martin Kovar	Czech Republic
2nd place, silver medalist(s)		Du Jian Ping	China
3rd place, bronze medalist(s)		Ioannis Kostakis	Greece

The Men's 100 metre freestyle S3 swimming event at the 2004 Summer Paralympics was competed on 19 September. It was won by Martin Kovar, representing Czech Republic.

== 1st round ==
Qualified for final round

Heat 1

19 Sept. 2004, morning session

Rank	Athlete	Time	Notes
1	Genezi Andrade (BRA)	2:05.64	
2	Kenneth Cairns (GBR)	2:06.21	
3	Samuel Soler (ESP)	2:09.25	
4	Cristopher Tronco (MEX)	2:18.43	
	Jaime Eulert (PER)	DSQ	

Heat 2

19 Sept. 2004, morning session

Rank	Athlete	Time	Notes
1	Du Jian Ping (CHN)	1:49.03	PR
2	Ioannis Kostakis (GRE)	1:55.41	
3	Martin Kovar (CZE)	1:57.09	
4	Albert Bakaev (RUS)	1:58.84	
5	Andrzej Ziembowski (POL)	2:04.68	
6	Carlo Piccoli (ITA)	2:05.01	
7	Oliver Deniz (ESP)	2:12.74	
8	Carlos Molina (ESP)	2:43.90	

== Final round ==
19 Sept. 2004, evening session

Rank	Athlete	Time	Notes
1st place, gold medalist(s)	Martin Kovar (CZE)	1:43.51	WR
2nd place, silver medalist(s)	Du Jian Ping (CHN)	1:48.00	
3rd place, bronze medalist(s)	Ioannis Kostakis (GRE)	1:55.79	
4	Carlo Piccoli (ITA)	1:57.22	
5	Kenneth Cairns (GBR)	1:57.30	
6	Albert Bakaev (RUS)	1:57.85	
7	Andrzej Ziembowski (POL)	2:02.14	
8	Genezi Andrade (BRA)	2:05.54	
