= Swimming at the 2004 Summer Paralympics – Men's 50 metre backstroke S3 =

Men's 50m Backstroke S3 at the XII Paralympic Games
- Paralympic Swimming
- Venue: Olympic Aquatic Centre
- Dates: 27 September 2004
- Competitors: 11 from 9 nations
- Winning time: 53.66

Medalists
1st place, gold medalist(s)		Du Jian Ping	China
2nd place, silver medalist(s)		Albert Bakaev	Russia
3rd place, bronze medalist(s)		Jaime Eulert	Peru

The Men's 50 metre backstroke S3 swimming event at the 2004 Summer Paralympics was competed on 27 September. It was won by Du Jian Ping, representing China.

== 1st round ==
Qualified for final round

Heat 1

27 Sept. 2004, morning session

Rank	Athlete	Time	Notes
1	Albert Bakaev (RUS)	55.83	
2	Jaime Eulert (PER)	55.99	
3	Oliver Deniz (ESP)	1:03.75	
4	Michael Demarco (USA)	1:04.78	
5	Georgios Papadimitriou (GRE)	1:13.63	

Heat 2

27 Sept. 2004, morning session

Rank	Athlete	Time	Notes
1	Martin Kovar (CZE)	57.00	
2	Genezi Andrade (BRA)	1:00.31	
3	Samuel Soler (ESP)	1:01.02	
4	Du Jian Ping (CHN)	1:01.80	
5	Carlos Molina (ESP)	1:06.28	
6	Nuno Vitorino (POR)	1:18.60	

== Final round ==
27 Sept. 2004, evening session

Rank	Athlete	Time	Notes
1st place, gold medalist(s)	Du Jian Ping (CHN)	53.66	
2nd place, silver medalist(s)	Albert Bakaev (RUS)	53.98	
3rd place, bronze medalist(s)	Jaime Eulert (PER)	55.76	
4	Martin Kovar (CZE)	58.73	
5	Genezi Andrade (BRA)	59.62	
6	Samuel Soler (ESP)	1:02.72	
7	Michael Demarco (USA)	1:04.64	
8	Oliver Deniz (ESP)	1:04.72	
