= Swimming at the 2004 Summer Paralympics – Men's 200 metre freestyle S3 =

Men's 200m Freestyle S3 at the XII Paralympic Games
- Paralympic Swimming
- Venue: Olympic Aquatic Centre
- Dates: 21 September 2004
- Competitors: 13 from 11 nations
- Winning time: 3:42.63

Medalists
1st place, gold medalist(s)		Martin Kovar	Czech Republic
2nd place, silver medalist(s)		Du Jian Ping	China
3rd place, bronze medalist(s)		Carlo Piccoli	Italy

The Men's 200 metre freestyle S3 swimming event at the 2004 Summer Paralympics was competed on 21 September. It was won by Martin Kovar, representing Czech Republic.

== 1st round ==
Qualified for final round

Heat 1

21 September 2004, morning session

Rank	Athlete	Time	Notes
1	Kenneth Cairns (GBR)	4:08.14	PR
2	Ioannis Kostakis (GRE)	4:08.87	
3	Genezi Andrade (BRA)	4:17.51	
4	Andrzej Ziembowski (POL)	4:34.75	
5	Oliver Deniz (ESP)	4:37.37	
6	Carlos Molina (ESP)	5:33.11	

Heat 2

21 September 2004, morning session

Rank	Athlete	Time	Notes
1	Du Jian Ping (CHN)	4:15.00	
2	Carlo Piccoli (ITA)	4:15.09	
3	Samuel Soler (ESP)	4:17.64	
4	Martin Kovar (CZE)	4:30.18	
5	Michael Demarco (USA)	4:38.40	
6	Cristopher Tronco (MEX)	4:50.28	
7	Nuno Vitorino (POR)	5:33.73	

== Final round ==
21 September 2004, evening session

Rank	Athlete	Time	Notes
1st place, gold medalist(s)	Martin Kovar (CZE)	3:42.63	WR
2nd place, silver medalist(s)	Du Jian Ping (CHN)	3:44.99	
3rd place, bronze medalist(s)	Carlo Piccoli (ITA)	4:06.20	
4	Ioannis Kostakis (GRE)	4:08.07	
5	Kenneth Cairns (GBR)	4:08.40	
6	Genezi Andrade (BRA)	4:16.62	
7	Samuel Soler (ESP)	4:16.79	
8	Andrzej Ziembowski (POL)	4:35.27	
