= Powerlifting in Cameroon =

Powerlifting in Cameroon is one of several para-sports in Cameroon for people with physical disabilities. The sport is represented nationally at the University Games.

Cameroon has a history of competing internationally in powerlifting dating back to at least 2006, when the sport appeared on the 2006 African Francophone Games for the Handicapped program. Cameroon won several medals in the sport in the home hosted 2007 edition. Cameroon tried to qualify lifters for the 2012 Summer Paralympics, ultimately sending Conrat Frederic Atangana, who became the country's first ever Paralympian at the country's debut Paralympic Games. There were no Cameroonians ranked internationally in 2009, 2010, 2011 and 2013.

== National ==
Para-sports had made their way on to the University Games program in Cameroon by 2014. At the 2015 edition, at least three para-sports events were contested including the javelin throw from athletics, table tennis and powerlifting.

== International competitions ==
Cameroon sent a delegation to the 2006 African Francophone Games for the Handicapped, where two sports on the program were wheelchair basketball and powerlifting.

The African Francophone Games for the Handicapped were created in 1994, with a Central African version being created in 2008. Cameroon was originally scheduled to host them in July of that year, but the Ministry of Sports and Physical Education postponed them because of poor facilities and lack of access to quality equipment. The Games did not take place until August. Cameroon won medals in powerlifting. Lifters participating included Francis Biwole Nkodo and Joelle Mboe. Mboe is nicknamed "Gazelle des Jeux". She won gold in the -67 kg class with a lift of 182 kg. Nkodo also won gold in powerlifting. Ghamsi Mimosette won gold in the women's -67 kg event with a lift of 70 kg. Conrat Frederic Atangana won gold in the men's -52 kg event with a lift of 140 kg.

Cameroon hosted the 2011 African Francophone Games for the Handicapped. Events on the program included athletics, powerlifting, table tennis and traditional blind wrestling. Funding issues were a major obstacle to hosting the event in a fully professional matter, though every attempt to do so was done. The Games had classifiers and anti-doping controls.

In May 2012, Cameroon sent a delegation to competition in Tunisia in order to try to qualify for the London Games. The country had five powerlifters who had tried to qualify for the London Games but were only successful in qualifying and funding for Atangana. The lifters who were unable to participate were all based in Cameroon, while Atangana was based in Europe and had easier access to funding. Atangana participated in the qualification event for the London Games in February 2012 in Dubai where he lifted 140 kg.

Cameroon sent a delegation to the 2014 IPC Powerlifting Open in Eger, Hungary. Originally, Cameroon planned to send nine powerlifters but visa issues meant only two lifters could participate. Their finish in Eger earned the country eight spots at the 2014 IPC Powerlifting World Championships in Dubai.

Atanga participated at the Paralympic ranking competition in Africa in September 2015 in Brazzaville, Congo, in the -59 kg men's event where he posted a lift of 160 kg. Maurice Francis Biwole Nkodo put up a lift of 166 kg to finish third in the -80 kg class.

=== Paralympics ===
Prior to 2011, the country had limited participation abroad as a result of domestic factors related to the NPC. Following major changes to the CNPC in August 2011, Cameroon emerged from its relative international isolation and set about participating in qualifying efforts for the 2012 Summer Paralympics in London. Five lifters competed in the 2011 IPC Fazza Powerlifting-Dubai, with Conrat Frederic Atangana ultimately earning a qualifying berth for London following the competition.

In the country's short Paralympic history, they have sent one powerlifter to the Games, Conrat Frederic Atangana in 2012. He competed in the Men's 56 kg event in London, where he did not medal. He finished ninth in an eleven deep field, with a best lift of 155 kg. His lift was an improvement of 15 kg that he had lifted at a competition in Dubai earlier in the year. Cameroon was based at the University of Bath ahead of the London Games. The delegation included the country's Chef de Mission, and a physiotherapist.

== Powerlifters ==
In 2016, the country had eight powerlifters registered with the International Paralympic Committee. This included six male lifters and two female lifters.

Athlete	Gender	Class	Competitions	IPC Registered 2016	Ref
Jean Aguedia	Male			Yes	
Conrat Frederic Atangana	Male	-52 kg -56 kg -59 kg	2008 African Francophone Games for the Handicapped 2011 IPC Fazza Powerlifting-Dubai 2012 IPC Fazza Powerlifting-Dubai 2012 Summer Paralympics 2015 African Paralympic Ranking Competition	Yes	
Jean Solange Avah Mbida	Male			Yes	
Maurice Francis Biwole Nkodo	Male	-80 kg	2007 African Francophone Games for the Handicapped 2008 African Francophone Games for the Handicapped 2014 Commonwealth Games 2015 Powerlifting European Open Championships 2015 African Paralympic Ranking Competition	Yes	
Julien Sodjine Motto	Male	-72 kg	2014 Commonwealth Games	Yes	
Philippe Touongo	Male			Yes	
Mimozette Nghamsi Fotie	Female			Yes	
Joseline Nyangono Okono	Female			Yes	
Joelle Mboe	Female		2008 African Francophone Games for the Handicapped	No	
Ghamsi Mimosette	Female		2008 African Francophone Games for the Handicapped	No	

National team powerlifters can face difficult conditions. In 2011, national team para-sports people for athletics and powerlifting trained on a dirt covered esplandande at Stade Omnisport de Yaoundé. Maurice Francis Biwole Nkodo is a lifter on national and international level. He has set a number of national records in the sport.

Two Cameroonians were ranked in internationally in 2014: Julien Sodjine Motto who finished the year ranked 24 in the -65 kg class with a best lift of 143 kg set in Glasgow and Maurice Francis Biwole Nkodo who finished the year ranked 20th with a best lift of 172 kg at the same competition in the men's -80 kg class. There were no Cameroonians ranked internationally in 2009, 2010, 2011 and 2013.

== See also ==
- Para-athletics in Cameroon
