= Cameroon at the Paralympics =

- IPC code: CMR
- NPC: Cameroonian National Paralympic Committee
- Medals: Gold 0 Silver 0 Bronze 0 Total 0

Summer appearances
- 2012; 2016; 2020; 2024

Cameroon made its Paralympic Games début at the 2012 Summer Paralympics in London, sending a single representative (Conrat Atangana) to compete in powerlifting.

== Medal tables ==
=== Medals by Summer Games ===
Games	Athletes	Gold	Silver	Bronze	Total	Rank
2012 London	1	0	0	0	0	-
2016 Rio de Janeiro	1	0	0	0	0	-
2020 Tokyo	3	0	0	0	0	-
2024 Paris	5	0	0	0	0	-
2028 Los Angeles	Future Event					
2032 Brisbane	Future Event					
Total		0	0	0	0	-

== Full results for Cameroon at the Paralympics ==
Name	Games	Sport	Event	Score	Rank
Conrat Atangana	2012 London	Powerlifting	Men's -56kg	155 kg	9th
Christian Gobe	2016 Rio	Athletics	Men's shot put F55	10.28 m	8th
Guillaume Junior Atangana	2020 Tokyo	Athletics	Men's 100m T11	11.52	3rd in heat 1; did not qualify
Guillaume Junior Atangana	2020 Tokyo	Athletics	Men's 400m T11	heats: 52.40 final: 52.17	1st in heat 3; 4th
Judith Mariette Lebog	2020 Tokyo	Athletics	Women's 100m T11	heats: 12.82 semi-final: DQ	2nd in heat 4; DQ in semi-final
Judith Mariette Lebog	2020 Tokyo	Athletics	Women's 200m T11	heats: 26.95 semi-final: 26.90	2nd in heat 4; 4th in semi-final 1
Mimozette Nghamsi Fotie	2020 Tokyo	Powerlifting	Women's -45kg	—	8th
Yves Noe Batifi Loumou	2024 Paris	Athletics	Men's High jump T63/42	1.77 m	6th
Arlette Mawe Fokoa	2024 Paris	Athletics	Women's shot put F57	9.10 m	8th
Arlette Mawe Fokoa	2024 Paris	Athletics	Women's discus throw F57	qualifiers: 21.87 m final: 23.94 m	4th in qualifiers; 11th
Thamar Gisele Mengue	2024 Paris	Powerlifting	Women's -73kg	108 kg	5th
Guileine Chemogne	2024 Paris	Taekwondo	Women's -47kg	Won First round	Did not advance
Marie Antoinette Dassi	2024 Paris	Taekwondo	Women's -65kg	Lost Bronze medal match	5th

== See also ==
- Cameroon at the Olympics
