= Swimming at the 2008 Summer Paralympics – Men's 100 metre freestyle S3 =

Men's 100 metre freestyle S3 at the XIII Paralympic Games
- Venue: Beijing National Aquatics Center
- Dates: September 7
- Competitors: 11 from 10 nations

Medalists
1st place, gold medalist(s)		Jianping Du	China
2nd place, silver medalist(s)		Dmytro Vynohradets	Ukraine
3rd place, bronze medalist(s)		Huanhua Li	China

The men's 100 metre freestyle S3 event at the 2008 Paralympic Games took place on September 7, at the Beijing National Aquatics Center.

Two heats were held, with five swimmers in the first heat and six swimmers in the second heat. The swimmers with the eight fastest times advanced to the final; there, they all competed in a single final heat to earn final placements.

== Heats ==
=== Heat 1 ===
Rank	Lane	Name	Nationality	Time	Notes
1	4	Ioannis Kostakis	Greece	1:52.89	Q
2	5	Dmytro Vynohradets	Ukraine	1:54.60	Q
3	2	Miguel Angel Martinez	Spain	2:02.20	Q
4	6	Michael Demarco	United States	2:14.97	Q
5	3	Carlo Piccoli	Italy	2:38.72	

=== Heat 2 ===
Rank	Lane	Name	Nationality	Time	Notes
1	5	Jianping Du	China	1:42.95	Q
2	3	Hanhua Lu	China	1:44.95	Q
3	6	Albert Bakaev	Russia	2:07.34	Q
4	2	Genezi Andrade	Brazil	2:07.59	Q
5	4	Cristopher Tronco Sánchez	Mexico	2:23.03	
6	7	Loi Si Aoi	Macau	3:09.89	

== Final ==
Rank	Lane	Name	Nationality	Time	Notes
1	4	Jianping Du	China	1:35.21	
2	6	Dmytro Vynohradets	Ukraine	1:35.65	
3	5	Hanhua Li	China	1:44.22	
4	3	Ioannis Kostakis	Greece	1:45.72	
5	2	Miguel Angel Martinez	Spain	2:02.29	
6	1	Genezi Andrade	Brazil	2:06.02	
7	8	Michael Demarco	United States	2:07.72	
8	7	Albert Bakaev	Russia	2:11.01	
