= Swimming at the 2004 Summer Paralympics – Men's 150 metre individual medley SM3 =

Men's 150m Individual Medley SM3 at the XII Paralympic Games
- Paralympic Swimming
- Venue: Olympic Aquatic Centre
- Dates: 26 September 2004
- Competitors: 12 from 10 nations
- Winning time: 3:00.50

Medalists
1st place, gold medalist(s)		Du Jian Ping	China
2nd place, silver medalist(s)		Jose Arnulfo Castorena	Mexico
3rd place, bronze medalist(s)		Juan Ignacio Reyes	Mexico

The Men's 150 metre individual medley SM3 swimming event at the 2004 Summer Paralympics was competed on 26 September. It was won by Du Jian Ping, representing China.

== 1st round ==
Qualified for final round

Heat 1

26 Sept. 2004, morning session

Rank	Athlete	Time	Notes
1	Jose Arnulfo Castorena (MEX)	3:12.39	
2	Du Jian Ping (CHN)	3:14.83	
3	Genezi Andrade (BRA)	3:24.19	
4	Andrej Zatko (SVK)	4:06.11	
5	Michael Demarco (USA)	4:41.59	
	Nenad Krisanovic (SCG)	DNF	

Heat 2

26 Sept. 2004, morning session

Rank	Athlete	Time	Notes
1	Somchai Doungkaew (THA)	3:09.75	
2	Juan Ignacio Reyes (MEX)	3:19.42	
3	Cristopher Tronco (MEX)	3:35.61	
4	Lee Hyung Yong (KOR)	3:37.66	
5	Ioannis Kostakis (GRE)	3:46.83	
	Carlo Piccoli (ITA)	DSQ	

== Final round ==
26 Sept. 2004, evening session

Rank	Athlete	Time	Notes
1st place, gold medalist(s)	Du Jian Ping (CHN)	3:00.50	WR
2nd place, silver medalist(s)	Jose Arnulfo Castorena (MEX)	3:04.16	
3rd place, bronze medalist(s)	Juan Ignacio Reyes (MEX)	3:07.92	
4	Somchai Doungkaew (THA)	3:12.43	
5	Genezi Andrade (BRA)	3:24.39	
6	Lee Hyung Yong (KOR)	3:33.46	
7	Cristopher Tronco (MEX)	3:34.21	
8	Ioannis Kostakis (GRE)	3:39.78	
