= Cycling at the 2024 Summer Paralympics – Men's pursuit C2 =

Men's individual pursuit C2 at the XVII Paralympic Games
- Venue: Vélodrome National
- Dates: 30 August 2024
- Competitors: 9 from 9 nations
- Winning time: 3:26.015

Medalists
1st place, gold medalist(s)		Alexandre Léauté	France
2nd place, silver medalist(s)		Ewoud Vromant	Belgium
3rd place, bronze medalist(s)		Matthew Robertson	Great Britain

The men's individual pursuit class C2 track cycling event at the 2024 Summer Paralympics took place on 30 August 2024 at the Vélodrome National.

== Competition format ==
The C category is for cyclists with a physical impairment (muscle power or range of motion, and impairments affecting the coordination) that prevents them from competing in able-bodied competition but still competes using a standard bicycle.

The competition starts with a qualifying round where it comprises a head-to-head race between the 7 cyclists; The 2 fastest cyclists in the qualifying would qualify to the gold medal final while the 3rd and 4th fastest will qualify to the bronze medal final where they will race head-to-head. The distance of this event is 3000 etresm. The medal finals are also held on the same day as the qualifying.

== Schedule ==
All times are Central European Summer Time (UTC+2)

Date	Time	Round
30 August	12:54	Qualifying
30 August	15:41	Finals

== Results ==
=== Qualifying ===
Rank	Heat	Cyclist	Nation	Result	Notes
1	5	Alexandre Léauté	France	3:24.298	QG, WR
2	4	Ewoud Vromant	Belgium	3:27.640	QG
3	3	Matthew Robertson	Great Britain	3:28.373	QB
4	4	Shota Kawamoto	Japan	3:29.875	QB
5	5	Darren Hicks	Australia	3:33.098	
6	2	Golibbek Mirzoyarov	Uzbekistan	3:52.446	
7	3	Telmo Pinão	Portugal	3:59.150	
8	2	Esteban Goddard	Panama	4:15.860	
9	1	Arshad Shaik	India	4:20.949	

=== Finals ===
Rank	Cyclist	Nation	Result	Notes
Gold medal final
1st place, gold medalist(s)	Alexandre Léauté	France	3:26.015	
2nd place, silver medalist(s)	Ewoud Vromant	Belgium	3:28.062	
Bronze medal final
3rd place, bronze medalist(s)	Matthew Robertson	Great Britain	3:30.497	
4	Shota Kawamoto	Japan	3:33.488	
