= Para-athletics in Cameroon =

Sport in Cameroon

Para-athletics in Cameroon is one of several sports that people with disabilities participate in, in the country. Competitors in the sport have represented their country in international competitions. Development of sport has also taken place locally as a result of international support.

== Development ==
The sport is supported by local clubs and schools. Club for the Blind Youth of Cameroon (French: Club des jeunes aveugles réhabilités du Cameroun) was an association supporting blind youth. In 2006, they supported a number of sporting activities for the blind at their club including athletics, African wrestling, judo and goalball. Years later, they were continuing to support torball, goalball and athletics for people with vision impairments.

In 2011, national team para-sports people for athletics and powerlifting trained on a dirt covered esplandande a Stade Omnisport de Yaoundé. The French Paralympic Committee has been working to assist in the development of para-sports in French speaking African countries. In 2013, ahead of the 2013 IPC Athletics World Championships in Lyon, France, Cameroon was one of six countries to benefit from a program by the French Paralympic Committee that saw doteste para-athletics equipment to try to assist the region in developing their sportspeople to the elite level by giving them access to high quality equipment required to compete at that level.

In 2014, Cameroonian para-sportspeople participated in the Queen's Baton Relay ahead of the 2014 Commonwealth Games. One of the reasons they participated in the Relay was to try to bring attention to para-sports in Cameroon, and to assist in changing the perception of para-athletics in their country. The goal was to try to get people to think of para-athletics as a normal and acceptable sport.

== International competitions ==
The Jeux de l'avenir pour personnes handicapées d'Afrique, zone Afrique centrale were created in 2008 as a result of support in Cameroon to host a Central African version of the Games. Cameroon was originally scheduled to host them in July 2008, but the Ministry of Sports and Physical Education postponed them because of poor facilities and lack of access to quality equipment. The Games did not take place until August. In athletics, Minosette dominated for Cameroon, winning gold medals in the women's 100 meters, the 200 meters and the long jump.

Following the formal creation of the CNPC in August 2011, the organization immediately set about trying to enter eight athletes into the 10th All Africa Games in Maputo. Events on the program included the 100 meters, 200 meters and long jump. FECASDEP was given funding to send 4 sportspeople to the 2011 All-Africa Games to compete in javelin and the 1,500 meters. FECASDEP held a two-week training camp ahead of the competition, and had a goal of having its athletes make the podium at the Games. FECASDV was funded for one athlete and two guides. He compete in the 100m, 200m, 400m and 800m events. Omer Abat was the coach for the vision impaired national team for Maputo.

Special Olympics Cameroon was supposed to send a delegation in 2011 to Athens World Games. One of the members of the team would have been track and field competitor Salomon Oyono.

In 2012, Cameroon sent 58 athletes to the sixth International Athletics Meeting of Tunis. The competition was a qualifying event for the 2012 Summer Paralympics.

Cameroon sent a delegation to the 2013 Czech Open. They were the first African country to participate in the event, and athletes had the opportunity to undergo international classification. The team included three athletes, Conrat Frederic Atangana, Jean Solange Avah Mbida and Herve Ndi. All participated in the javelin event, with Cameroon coming away with three javelin bronze medals. Avah Mbida also won bronze in the T54 100 meter and 200 meter events.

The country also sent a delegation to the 2014 and 2015 IPC Athletics Grand Prix Dubai. Andre Ndo Andeme participated both years, winning in the men's T12 100 meters in 2014 and finishing second in 2015. Vision impaired runner Charles Christol Atangana Ntsama won three medals in 2015 of the thirteen total claimed by Cameroon at the event. He claimed gold in the men's T11 100 meter event in a time of 12.03 seconds and set a A qualifying time for the 2016 Summer Paralympics. Cameroon sent a delegation of 11 athletes and 2 guides to the 2015 edition. Two women, Irène Ngono Noah and Hermine Guemo Talla, made their international debut for Cameroon at the 2015 edition. Two men also competed in their first major international event for Cameroon: Charles Christol Atangana Ntsama and Luc Yomby Kifie. Three vision impaired athletes qualified for the 2015 IBSA World Games and the 2015 IPC Athletics World Championships at the Dubai Grand Prix. They were Charles Atangana in the 200 meter and 400 meter events, Ndo Andeme in the Men's T12 200 meter event and Patrick Awa Bakounga in the 400 meter.

Christian Gobe was one of Cameroon's representatives at the 2016 edition. He came away with gold in the men's F55 shot put after setting an African record with a throw of 10.78 meters. Judith Mariette Lebog was another member of the Cameroon delegation in Dubai in 2016. She came away with gold in the women's T11 100 meter event after posting a time of 14.16 seconds.

Cameroon sent a delegation to the Glasgow hosted 2014 Commonwealth Games. Cameroon was scheduled to send a delegation to the 2014 INAS World Indoor Athletics Championships that took place from February 28 to March 2 in Reims, France.

Cameroon had a number of para-athletes competing at the 2015 All African Games, including a number a pair who earned medals. Charles Atagana Ntsana won bronze in the men's T11 100m. Christian Gobe won gold in the men's Shot put F54-55.

Gobe represented Cameroon in May 2016 at the IPC Athletics Grand Prix, Nottwil, Switzerland, where he set an African record in the F55 men's shot put with a throw of 10.49 meters. The year before at the 2015 edition of the event, Gobe finished first in the men's F55 shot put with a best throw of 9.26 meters.

Charles Atangana Ntsama set a A qualifying time for the 2016 Summer Paralympics in Rio while running with guide Cyrille Lombano Bonia in the T11 100 meters. He set the time while wearing kit provided via a sponsorship deal with MACRON, the first time that a Cameroonian para-sportsperson had worn sponsored kit in an international competition. Because of the depth of competition in the men's T11 100 meter event, despite meeting the A-Qualifying Time, Atangana Nstama Charles was not selected by the IPC to compete at the Rio Paralympics. This left Gobe as the only representative at the Rio Games. He had been originally been nominated to the IPC to compete in the shotput, discuss, 100 meter and 200 meter events.

Christian Gobe represented Cameroon at the 2016 Summer Paralympics. He competed in the Men's Shot Put F55 event. In a thirteen deep field, he finished outside of the medals.

In Paris 2024 Paralympic Games, 8 athletes and 1 guide runner competed, making it the largest-ever Refugee Paralympic Team.

== Emigration ==
Joseph Kemgang is a Cameroonian para-athlete and wheelchair basketball player. Born in 1981 in Yaoundé, he contracted polio when he was 6-years-old and lost the use of his legs. Three years later, he was abandoned by his parents and went to live with his aunts. Lacking a wheelchair, he got around on all fours using sandals to protect his knees. When he was a 12-year-old, the aunt died so he went to live with a friend of his mother. Because of an inability to go to school as a result of his disability, he took up street sports with other children with disabilities in his neighborhood. Because of cultural bias that believes people with disabilities are cursed, he had few opportunities and, like many others in his position, took to the street to beg.

In the mid-1990s, he came across some young machinists, artists and welders who made wheelchairs. They made him a racing wheelchair using bicycle parts. In 1997, he entered a half marathon in Yaoundé where he came away the winner with prize money of 37,000 CFA Francs (37FF of the time, slightly more than €5 ). The following year, he became Cameroon's sole para-athletics competitor at the Future Games of Disabled People in Francophone Africa (JAPHAF) in the Ivory Coast. He was back for the 2000 edition in the Ivory Coast, where he won gold in the 100 meter and 400 meter wheelchair athletics events.

Kemgang then set about trying to qualify for the 2000 Summer Paralympics in Sydney. He competed at a qualifying event in Tunisia, where he was spotted by French wheelchair basketball team ASPAR Saint Ouen (Seine Saint Denis) who offered him a contract, which he accepted. He was classifiated as a 2-point player and played as a point guard. As a member of the team, he helped them win the 2003 French Cup. He stayed with the team until 2004, where after he tried to renew his residency, he was rejected, put into administrative detention. This situation put his ability to participate in para-sports on hold in France.

Conrat Frederic Atangana, Jean Solange Avah Mbida and Herve Ndi are other Cameroonian who eventually applied for refugee status in France. They all landed in Pas-de-Calais, France, because Cameroonian football Marc-Vivien Foé was there. After immigrating as a group, all three remained involved with powerlifting, athletics and wheelchair basketball.

== Athletes ==
In 2016, the country had 39 athletes registered with the International Paralympic Committee.

Athlete	Gender	Date of birth	Disciplines	National Team Debut	Competitions	Registered 2016	Ref
Serge Parfait Abana Fouda	Male					Yes	
Jean Aguedia	Male	1981	F57 javelin		2015 Fazaa International Athletics Competition	Yes	
Emmanuel Pinochet Amougui	Male	1988	F57 javelin		2015 Fazaa International Athletics Competition	Yes	
Conrat Frederic Atangana	Male	1987			2013 Czech Open 2014 Paralympic Athletics Meeting Paris Seine-S	Yes	2014
Guillaume Junior Atangana	Male					Yes	
Cristol Charles Atangana Ntsama	Male		T11 100m		2015 IPC Athletics Grand Prix Dubai 2015 Fazaa International 2015 All Africa Games	Yes	
Aime Blaise Atchoukeu Mbithe	Male					Yes	
Pierre Arnaud Ateba Tollo	Male					Yes	
Jean Solange Avah Mbida	Male		T54 100m T54 200m F54 javelin		2013 Czech Open	Yes	
Louis Gervais Baha	Male	1983	F34 javelin		2015 Fazaa International Athletics Competition	Yes	
Patrick Bakounga Awa	Male					Yes	
Maurice Francis Biwole Nkodo	Male					Yes	
Patrice Merlin Elouma	Male					Yes	
Christian Gobe	Male	May 13, 1977	T54 100m T54 200m F55 shot put		2013 IPC Athletics World Championships 2015 IPC Athletics Grand Prix Nottwil, Switzerland 2015 Fazaa International Athletics Competition 2016 IPC Athletics Grand Prix Nottwil, Switzerland 2016 IPC Athletics Grand Prix Dubai 2016 Summer Paralympics	Yes	
Eric Patrick Guethe Fondjo	Male					Yes	
Vivien Bienvenu Mbida	Male	1982	F57 javelin F57 shot put		2015 Fazaa International Athletics Competition	Yes	
Garba Mohamed	Male					Yes	
Mohamed Mohamed Garba	Male		T12 200		2015 Fazaa International Athletics Competition	Yes	
Joseph Mvondo	Male	1979	F57 javelin		2015 Fazaa International Athletics Competition	Yes	
Herve Ndi	Male		F57 javelin		2013 Czech Open	Yes	
Andre Patrick Ndo Andeme	Male	August 11, 1985	T12 100m T12 200m		2014 Fazaa International 2015 IPC Athletics Grand Prix Dubai 2015 Fazaa International	Yes	
Arouna Nsangou	Male					Yes	
Privat Nsem Medjoto	Male					Yes	
Duplex Cressot Nteuffa Ntang	Male					Yes	
Hermane Francois Ntsoli	Male		F55 shot put		2015 Fazaa International	Yes	
Jose Onguene Malla	Male					Yes	
Yves Marcellin Ossomba	Male					Yes	
Ulrich Dimitri Pouadeu Ngaleu	Male	1999	F53 shot put			Yes	
Julien Sodjine Motto	Male					Yes	
Martin Talla Djoyou	Male					Yes	
Nelly Teumeni Djago	Male					Yes	
Georges Timoh Wah	Male	1989	T47 200m T46 400m		2015 Fazaa International 2016 Sharjah International Open	Yes	
Luc Yomby Kifie	Male			2015 IPC Athletics Grand Prix Dubai	2015 IPC Athletics Grand Prix Dubai	Yes	
Patrick Zandjo	Male		T46 200m		2015 Fazaa International	Yes	
Leonel Clement Nsegbe	Male	1985	T54 1500m			No	
Alain Martin Manda Essomba	Male	1982	F57 javelin		2015 Fazaa International	No	
Felix Raoul Abina Mvodo	Male		T46 200m		2015 Fazaa International	No	
Djimdoumgar	Male	1974	F57 javelin F37 shot put		2015 Fazaa International	No	
Claude Mbag Jr.	Male	1983	F41 shot put			No	
Abdou Pieplieyou	Male	1979	F54 shot put			No	
Salomon Oyono	Male		T20 400m F20 shot put			No	
Yollande Arielle Assena Omenguele	Female					Yes	
Lysette Manuela Ehowe Moussima	Female					Yes	
Judith Mariette Lebog	Female		T11 100m		2016 IPC Athletics Grand Prix Dubai	Yes	
Mimozette Nghamsi Fotie	Female					Yes	
Joseline Nyangono Okono	Female					Yes	
Irène Ngono Noah	Female	1988	T12 200m	2015 IPC Athletics Grand Prix Dubai	2015 IPC Athletics Grand Prix Dubai 2015 Fazaa International Athletics Competition	No	
Hermine Guemo Talla	Female	1989	T11 200m	2015 IPC Athletics Grand Prix Dubai	2015 IPC Athletics Grand Prix Dubai 2015 Fazaa International Athletics Competition	No	
Rose Sandrine Afom	Female	1986	F44 javelin		2015 Fazaa International Athletics Competition	No	
Larissa Alvine Malobe Ehiyo	Female	1993	T37 400m			No	
Melanie Ze	Female	1994	F31 shot put			No	
Martine Tamibe	Female	1982	F57 shot put			No	
Arlette Mawe Fokoa	Female	1989	F57 shot put			No	

== Coaches ==
In 2011, the national team coach was Constance Nchifi.
