= Peru at the 2000 Summer Paralympics =

- IPC code: PER
- NPC: National Paralympic Committee Peru

in Sydney
- Competitors: 4 in 2 sports
- Medals Ranked 47th: Gold 1 Silver 1 Bronze 0 Total 2

Summer Paralympics appearances (overview)
- 1972; 1976; 1980–1992; 1996; 2000; 2004; 2008; 2012; 2016; 2020; 2024

There were one female and three male athletes representing the country at the 2000 Summer Paralympics.

== Medallists ==
Medal	Name	Sport	Event
Gold	Jaime Eulert	Swimming	Men's 50m freestyle S3
Silver	Jaime Eulert	Swimming	Men's 50m backstroke S3

== See also ==
- Peru at the 2000 Summer Olympics
- Peru at the Paralympics

== Bibliography ==
- International Paralympic Committee (2000). "Appendix C: Athlete Numbers - By Delegation". Sydney 2000 Paralympic Games Post Games Report. Sydney.
