= Cycling at the 2020 Summer Paralympics – Men's road race C1–3 =

Men's road race C1-3 at the XVI Paralympic Games
- Venue: Fuji Speedway
- Dates: 2 September 2021
- Competitors: 39 from 27 nations
- Winning time: 2:04:23

Medalists
1st place, gold medalist(s)		Benjamin Watson	Great Britain
2nd place, silver medalist(s)		Finlay Graham	Great Britain
3rd place, bronze medalist(s)		Alexandre Léauté	France

The men's road race C1-3 cycling event at the 2020 Summer Paralympics took place on 2 September 2021, at the Fuji Speedway in Shizuoka Prefecture. 39 riders competed in the event.

The event covers the following three classifications, that all use standard bicycles:

- C1: cyclists with severe hemiplegic or diplegic spasticity; severe athetosis or ataxia; bilateral through knee amputation, etcetera.
- C2: cyclists with moderate hemiplegic or diplegic spasticity; moderate athetosis or ataxia; unilateral above knee amputation, etcetera.
- C3: cyclists with moderate hemiplegic or diplegic spasticity; moderate athetosis or ataxia; bilateral below knee or unilateral through knee amputation, etcetera.

== Results ==
The event took place on 2 September 2021 at 9:48:

Rank	Rider	Nationality	Class	Time	Deficit
1st place, gold medalist(s)	Benjamin Watson	Great Britain	C3	2:04:23	
2nd place, silver medalist(s)	Finlay Graham	Great Britain	C3	2:05:43	+1:20
3rd place, bronze medalist(s)	Alexandre Léauté	France	C2	2:11:06	+6:43
4	Fabio Anobile	Italy	C3	s.t.	
5	Jaco van Gass	Great Britain	C3	s.t.	
6	Masaki Fujita	Japan	C3	s.t.	
7	Steffen Warias	Germany	C3	s.t.	
8	Diederick Schelfhout	Belgium	C3	s.t.	
9	Arslan Gilmutdinov	RPC	C2	2:11:10	+6:47
10	Ricardo Ten Argilés	Spain	C1	2:11:15	+6:52
11	Henrik Marvig	Sweden	C3	2:11:43	+7:20
12	Darren Hicks	Australia	C2	2:12:10	+7:47
13	Matthias Schindler	Germany	C3	2:17:02	+12:39
14	Alejandro Perea Arango	Colombia	C3	2:17:56	+13:33
15	Israel Hilario Rimas	Peru	C2	2:18:00	+13:37
16	Ewoud Vromant	Belgium	C2	2:19:19	+14:56
17	Nikolaos Papangelis	Greece	C2	s.t.	
18	David Nicholas	Australia	C3	2:21:08	+16:45
19	Ivo Koblasa	Czech Republic	C2	2:21:21	+16:58
20	Mikhail Astashov	RPC	C1	2:22:14	+17:51
21	Daniel Strandberg	Sweden	C3	2:23:00	+18:37
22	Aaron Keith	United States	C1	2:26:00	+21:37
23	Henry Raabe	Costa Rica	C3	2:26:05	+21:42
24	Michael Teuber	Germany	C1	2:26:53	+22:30
25	Liang Guihua	China	C2	2:27:03	+22:40
26	Eduardo Santas Asensio	Spain	C3	2:28:22	+23:59
27	Mohamed Lahna	Morocco	C2	2:28:51	+24:28
28	Shota Kawamoto	Japan	C2	s.t.	
29	Pierre Senska	Germany	C1	2:29:26	+25:03
30	Eduard Mihaita Moescu	Romania	C2	-1 LAP	
31	Carlos Alberto Gomes Soares	Brazil	C1	-1 LAP	
32	Telmo Pinao	Portugal	C2	-1 LAP	
33	Mohamad Yusof Hafizi Shaharuddin	Malaysia	C1	-1 LAP	
34	Victor Hugo Garrido Marquez	Venezuela	C2	-1 LAP	
35	Damian Lopez Alfonso	Cuba	C1	-1 LAP	
36	Rodrigo Fernando Lopez	Argentina	C1	-2 LAP	
	Joseph Berenyi	United States	C3	DNF	
	Ross Wilson	Canada	C1	DNF	
	Ahmad Mubarak Almansoori	United Arab Emirates	C2	DNF	

s.t. Same time
