= Peru at the 1996 Summer Paralympics =

- IPC code: PER
- NPC: National Paralympic Committee Peru

in Atlanta
- Competitors: 3
- Medals Ranked 50th: Gold 1 Silver 0 Bronze 0 Total 1

Summer Paralympics appearances (overview)
- 1972; 1976; 1980–1992; 1996; 2000; 2004; 2008; 2012; 2016; 2020; 2024

Three male athletes from Peru competed at the 1996 Summer Paralympics in Atlanta, United States. Jaime Eulert won Peru's first ever gold medal in swimming.

== Medallists ==
Medal	Name	Sport	Event
Gold	Jaime Eulert	Swimming	Men's 50m freestyle S3

== See also ==
- Peru at the Paralympics
- Peru at the 1996 Summer Olympics
