= Cycling at the 2020 Summer Paralympics – Men's individual pursuit C2 =

Men's individual pursuit C2 at the XVI Paralympic Games
- Venue: Izu Velodrome
- Dates: 26 August 2021
- Competitors: 11 from 11 nations

Medalists
1st place, gold medalist(s)		Alexandre Léauté	France
2nd place, silver medalist(s)		Darren Hicks	Australia
3rd place, bronze medalist(s)		Liang Guihua	China

The men's individual pursuit class C2 track cycling event at the 2020 Summer Paralympics took place on 26 August 2021 at the Izu Velodrome, Japan. This class is for cyclists who have impairments that affect their legs, arms, and/or trunk but are still capable to use a standard bicycle. 11 cyclists all coming from different nations, will be competing in this event.

== Competition format ==
The competition begins with the qualifying round where all 12 cyclists are divided into 6 heats, 2 cyclists in each heat except for heat 1 which will only contain 1 cyclist; they will compete on a time trial basis. The 2 fastest in the qualifying round would qualify to the gold medal final while the 3rd and 4th fastest will qualify to the bronze medal final. The distance of this event is 3000m. The event finals are held on the same day as the qualifying.

== Schedule ==
All times are Japan Standard Time (UTC+9)

Date	Time	Round
Thursday, 26 August	11:12	Qualifying
Thursday, 26 August	15:27	Finals

== Records ==
World Record	Ewoud Vromant (BEL)	3:36.322	Milton, Canada	30 January 2020
Paralympic Record	Liang Guihua (CHN)	3:42.916	Rio de Janeiro, Brazil	9 September 2016

== Results ==
=== Qualifying ===
Rank	Heat	Nation	Cyclists	Result	Notes
1	5	France	Alexandre Léauté	3:31.817	QG, WR
2	5	Australia	Darren Hicks	3:33.589	QG
3	6	China	Liang Guihua	3:34.158	QB
4	3	Japan	Shota Kawamoto	3:36.117	QB
5	4	RPC	Arslan Gilmutdinov	3:39.949	
6	3	Greece	Nikolaos Papangelis	3:47.605	
7	4	Czech Republic	Ivo Koblasa	3:48.914	
8	2	Portugal	Telmo Pinão	4:03.192	
9	2	Romania	Eduard Mihaita Moescu	4:04.175	
10	1	Venezuela	Victor Hugo Garrido Márquez	4:30.602	
	6	Belgium	Ewoud Vromant	DSQ	

=== Finals ===
Rank	Nation	Cyclists	Result	Notes
Gold medal final
1st place, gold medalist(s)	France	Alexandre Léauté	3:31.478	WR
2nd place, silver medalist(s)	Australia	Darren Hicks	3:35.064	
Bronze medal final
3rd place, bronze medalist(s)	China	Liang Guihua	3:34.781	
4	Japan	Shota Kawamoto	3:38.947	
