= Peru at the 2008 Summer Paralympics =

- IPC code: PER
- NPC: National Paralympic Committee Peru

in Beijing
- Competitors: 4 in 3 sports
- Medals: Gold 0 Silver 0 Bronze 0 Total 0

Summer Paralympics appearances (overview)
- 1972; 1976; 1980–1992; 1996; 2000; 2004; 2008; 2012; 2016; 2020; 2024

Peru sent a delegation of four athletes to compete in three sports at the 2008 Summer Paralympics in Beijing, China.

== Equestrian ==
- Rosa Loewenthal

=== Powerlifting ===
Athlete	Event	Result	Rank
Niel Garcia Trelles	52kg	NMR	

=== Swimming ===
==== Men ====
Athlete	Class	Event	Heats		Final	
Athlete	Class	Event	Result	Rank	Result	Rank
Jimmy Eulert	S3	50m freestyle	DSQ		did not advance	
Jimmy Eulert	S3	50m backstroke	DNS		did not advance	
Jose Gonzalez-Mugaburu	SB6	100m breaststroke	1:46.67	10	did not advance	

== See also ==
- 2008 Summer Paralympics
- Peru at the Paralympics
- Peru at the 2008 Summer Olympics
