= Cycling at the 2024 Summer Paralympics – Men's road time trial C2 =

Men's road time trial C2 at the XVII Paralympic Games
- Venue: Clichy-sous-Bois
- Dates: 4 September
- Competitors: 11 from 11 nations
- Winning time: 19:24.45

Medalists
1st place, gold medalist(s)		Alexandre Léauté	France
2nd place, silver medalist(s)		Ewoud Vromant	Belgium
3rd place, bronze medalist(s)		Darren Hicks	Australia

The Men's time trial C2 road cycling event at the 2024 Summer Paralympics took place on 4 September 2024, at Clichy-sous-Bois, Paris. Eleven riders competed in the event.

The C2 classification is for cyclists with moderate to severe impairment:

C2: moderate hemiplegic or diplegic spasticity; moderate athetosis or ataxia; unilateral above knee amputation, etc.

== Results ==
Rank	Rider	Nationality	Class	Time	Deficit
1st place, gold medalist(s)	Alexandre Léauté	France	C2	19:24.45	
2nd place, silver medalist(s)	Ewoud Vromant	Belgium	C2	19:26.61	+0:02.16
3rd place, bronze medalist(s)	Darren Hicks	Australia	C2	19:40.08	+0:15.63
4	Nikolaos Papangelis	Greece	C2	20:12.32	+0:47.87
5	Matthew Robertson	Great Britain	C2	20:52.15	+1:27.70
6	Israel Hilaro Rimas	Peru	C2	21:28.46	+2:04.01
7	Golibbek Mirzoyarov	Uzbekistan	C2	21:46.11	+2:21.66
8	Shota Kawamoto	Japan	C2	21:50.29	+2:25.84
9	Telmo Pinao	Portugal	C2	23:04.56	+3:40.11
10	Esteban Goddard Medica	Panama	C2	24:01.55	+4:37.10
11	Arshad Shaik	India	C2	25:20.11	+5:55.66
