= Peru at the 2020 Summer Paralympics =

- IPC code: PER
- NPC: National Paralympic Association of Peru

in Tokyo
- Competitors: 11 in 8 sports
- Flag bearers: Leonor Espinoza; Efraín Sotacuro
- Medals Ranked 59th: Gold 1 Silver 0 Bronze 0 Total 1

Summer Paralympics appearances (overview)
- 1972; 1976; 1980–1992; 1996; 2000; 2004; 2008; 2012; 2016; 2020; 2024

Peru competed at the 2020 Summer Paralympics from 24 August to 5 September 2021.

== Medalists ==
Medal	Name	Sport	Event	Date
Gold	Leonor Espinoza	Taekwondo	Women's 49 kg	2 September

== Athletics ==
Rosbil Guillén has been selected to compete in the 2020 Summer Paralympics after obtaining the qualifying mark for the 2020 Summer Paralympics at the 2019 Parapan American Games where he won the gold medal.

Athlete	Event	Heats		Final	
Athlete	Event	Result	Rank	Result	Rank
Rosbil Guillén	Men's 1500m T11	4:19.49 SB	4	DNA	11
Rosbil Guillén	Men's 5000m T11	—N/a		15:35.82 PB	5
Melissa Baldera	Women's 100m T11	13.90 PB	3	DNA	10
Melissa Baldera	Women's 200m T11	29.16	4	DNA	13
Melissa Baldera	Women's 400m T11	1:04.44 PB	4	DNA	4
Efrain Sotacuro	Men's marathon T46	N/A		2:41:20	7
Carlos Sangama	Men's marathon T46	N/A		3:00:50 SB	11

== Badminton ==
Athlete	Event	Group Stage			Quarterfinal	Semifinal	Final / BM	
Athlete	Event	Opposition Score	Opposition Score	Rank	Opposition Score	Opposition Score	Opposition Score	Rank
Pilar Jáuregui	Women's singles WH2	Gureeva (RPC); L (22–20, 11–21, 10–21)	Liu (CHN); L (5–21, 9–21)	3	Did not advance			

== Cycling ==
Peru sent one male cyclist after successfully getting a slot in the 2018 UCI Nations Ranking Allocation quota for the Americas.

=== Road ===
Athlete	Event	Time	Rank
Israel Hilario Rimas	Men's road time trial C2	37:25.86	6
Israel Hilario Rimas	Men's road race C1-3	2:18:00	15

== Judo ==
Athlete	Event	Preliminaries	Quarterfinals	Semifinals	Repechage First round	Repechage Final	Final / BM	
Athlete	Event	Opposition Result	Opposition Result	Opposition Result	Opposition Result	Opposition Result	Opposition Result	Rank
Freed Villalobos	Men's −81 kg	BYE	Gerardo Rodríguez (CUB) L 0–10IPP	Did not advance				9

== Powerlifting ==
Athlete	Event	Total lifted	Rank
Niel García	Men's -59 kg	151	9

== Swimming ==
One Peruvian swimmer has successfully entered the paralympic slot after breaking the MQS. A second swimmer qualified via tripartite invitation.

=== Men's events ===
Athlete	Events	Heats		Final	
Athlete	Events	Time	Rank	Time	Rank
Rodrigo Santillán	50 m backstroke S2	1:06.99	6	Did not advance	11
Rodrigo Santillán	100 m backstroke S2	2:20.41	4 Q	2:21.95	8

=== Women's events ===
Athlete	Events	Heats		Final	
Athlete	Events	Time	Rank	Time	Rank
Dunia Felices	50 m butterfly S5	1:00.29	6	Did not advance	12
Dunia Felices	200 m freestyle S5	3:47.77	6	Did not advance	11

== Taekwondo ==
Peru qualified one athletes to compete at the Paralympics competition. Leonor Espinoza qualified by winning the gold medal at the 2020 Americas Qualification Tournament in San Jose, Costa Rica.

Athlete	Event	First round	Quarterfinals	Semifinals	Final	
Athlete	Event	Opposition Result	Opposition Result	Opposition Result	Opposition Result	Rank
Leonor Espinoza	Women's –49 kg	—N/a	Aruna (IND); W (84-21)	Isakova (UZB); W (17-7)	Meryem (TUR); W (34-21)	Gold medal

== See also ==
- Peru at the Paralympics
- Peru at the 2020 Summer Olympics
