= Peru at the 1972 Summer Paralympics =

- IPC code: PER
- NPC: National Paralympic Committee Peru

in Heidelberg
- Competitors: 1 in 1 sport
- Flag bearer: José González Mugaburu
- Medals Ranked -th: Gold 0 Silver 0 Bronze 0 Total 0

Summer Paralympics appearances (overview)
- 1972; 1976; 1980–1992; 1996; 2000; 2004; 2008; 2012; 2016; 2020; 2024

Peru made its Paralympic Games début at the 1972 Summer Paralympics in Heidelberg. It sent only one competitor, swimmer José González Mugaburu. Competing in disability category 4, he entered three events, but did not win any medals.

== Swimming ==
Athlete	Events	Heats		Final	
Athlete	Events	Time	Rank	Time	Rank
José González Mugaburu	Men's 3x25 m medley 4	1:21.90	11	Did not advance	
José González Mugaburu	Men's 50 m backstroke 4	0:44.596	4 Q	0:44.266	4
José González Mugaburu	Men's 50 m breaststroke 4	4:44.25	11	Did not advance	

== See also ==
- Peru at the 1972 Summer Olympics
