= Peru at the Paralympics =

- IPC code: PER
- NPC: National Paralympic Committee Peru
- Medals: Gold 5 Silver 1 Bronze 4 Total 10

Summer appearances
- 1972; 1976; 1980–1992; 1996; 2000; 2004; 2008; 2012; 2016; 2020; 2024

Peru made its Paralympic Games début at the 1972 Summer Paralympics in Heidelberg, with a single representative to compete in swimming. It sent two competitors to the 1976 Summer Paralympics, then was absent for two decades, before returning in 1996 with a three-man delegation. It has participated in every subsequent edition of the Summer Paralympics, but has never taken part in the Winter Paralympics.

Peruvians have won a total of eight Paralympic medals: three gold, one silver and four bronze. The country's first medals came in 1976, when Teresa Chiappo won gold in the women's singles (category D) in table tennis, and bronze in the women's javelin (category D). J. Gonzales took bronze in the men's 100m backstroke, category 5.

Also in swimming, Jaime Eulert won Peru's only medal of the 1996 Games: a gold in the men's 50m freestyle S3, with a world record time of 51.95s. He won another gold in the same event in 2000, breaking his own world record and setting a new one in 49.03s; to that, he added a silver medal in the 50m backstroke. He medalled again in both those events in 2004, taking two bronze. In 2008, Eulert was a non-starter in the backstroke, and was disqualified in the freestyle. No other member of Peru's three-man delegation that year won a medal, and the country thus finished the Games without a medal for the first time since 1972.

== Medal tally ==
Event	Gold	Silver	Bronze	Total	Ranking
1972 Summer Paralympics	0	0	0	0	-
1976 Summer Paralympics	1	0	2	3	29
1980 - 1992	did not compete				
1996 Summer Paralympics	1	0	0	1	50
2000 Summer Paralympics	1	1	0	2	47
2004 Summer Paralympics	0	0	2	2	71
2008 Summer Paralympics	0	0	0	0	-
2012 Summer Paralympics	0	0	0	0	-
2016 Summer Paralympics	0	0	0	0	-
2020 Summer Paralympics	1	0	0	1	59
Total	4	1	4	9	78

== Medalists ==
Medal	Name	Games	Sport	Event
Gold	Teresa Chiappo	(Canada) 1976 Toronto	Table tennis	Women's singles D
Bronze	Teresa Chiappo	(Canada) 1976 Toronto	Athletics	Women's javelin throw D
Bronze	José González	(Canada) 1976 Toronto	Swimming	Men's 100m backstroke 5
Gold	Jaime Eulert	(United States) 1996 Atlanta	Swimming	Men's 50m freestyle S3
Gold	Jaime Eulert	(Australia) 2000 Sydney	Swimming	Men's 50m freestyle S3
Silver	Jaime Eulert	(Australia) 2000 Sydney	Swimming	Men's 50m backstroke S3
Bronze	Jaime Eulert	(Greece) 2004 Athens	Swimming	Men's 50m freestyle S3
Bronze	Jaime Eulert	(Greece) 2004 Athens	Swimming	Men's 50m backstroke S3
Gold	Leonor Espinoza	(Japan) 2020 Tokyo	Taekwondo	Women's 49 kg

== See also ==
- Peru at the Olympics
