= Cameroon at the 2024 Summer Paralympics =

- Flag of Cameroon
- IPC code: CMR
- NPC: Cameroonian National Paralympic Committee

in Paris, France August 28, 2024 – September 8, 2024
- Competitors: 5 (1 man and 4 women) in 3 sports
- Flag bearers: Yves Noe Batifi Loumou; Marie Antoinnette Dassi
- Medals: Gold 0 Silver 0 Bronze 0 Total 0

Summer Paralympics appearances (overview)
- 2012; 2016; 2020; 2024

Cameroon competed at the 2024 Summer Paralympics in Paris, France, from 28 August to 8 September 2024. It was the nation's fourth consecutive appearance at the Summer Paralympics.

== Competitors ==
The following is the list of number of competitors in the Games.

Sport	Men	Women	Total
Athletics	1	1	2
Powerlifting	0	1	1
Taekwondo	0	2	2
Total	1	4	5

== Athletics ==
Key

- Note–Ranks given for track events are within the athlete's heat only
- Q = Qualified for the next round
- q = Qualified for the next round as a fastest loser or, in field events, by position without achieving the qualifying target
- DQ = Disqualified
- PR = Paralympic Record
- AR = Area (or continental) Record
- NR = National Record
- SB = Season's Best
- N/A = Round not applicable for the event
- Bye = Athlete not required to compete in round

Field Events
Men

Athlete	Event	Final	
Athlete	Event	Result	Rank
Yves Noe Batifi Loumou	High jump T63	1.77	6

Women

Athlete	Event	Qualification		Final	
Athlete	Event	Result	Rank	Result	Rank
Arlette Mawe Fokoa	Shot put F57	—N/a		9.10	8
Arlette Mawe Fokoa	Discus throw F57	21.87	4 q	23.94	11

== Powerlifting ==
Athlete	Event	Attempts (kg)				Result (kg)	Rank
Athlete	Event	1	2	3	4	Result (kg)	Rank
Thamar Gisele Mengue	Women's 73kg	99	104	108	—N/a	108	5

== Taekwondo ==
Cameroon entered two athletes to compete at the Paralympics competition, marking the nation's debut at the sport. Guileine Chemogne and Marie Antoinette Dassi, qualified for Paris 2024, following the triumph of their gold medal results in their respective classes, through the 2024 African Qualification Tournament in Dakar, Senegal.

Athlete	Event	First round	Quarterfinals	Semifinals	Repechage 1	Repechage 2	Final / BM	
Athlete	Event	Opposition Result	Opposition Result	Opposition Result	Opposition Result	Opposition Result	Opposition Result	Rank
Guileine Chemogne	Women's –47 kg	Espinoza (PER); L 9–28	Did not advance					
Marie Antoinette Dassi	Women's –65 kg	Savinskaya (NPA); W 15-2	Er (TUR); W 13-6	Moura (BRA); L 1-21	—N/a		Kjaer (DEN); L 2-6	5

== See also ==
- Cameroon at the 2024 Summer Olympics
- Cameroon at the Paralympics
