= Cycling at the 2020 Summer Paralympics – Men's road time trial C2 =

Men's road time trial C2 at the XVI Paralympic Games
- Venue: Fuji Speedway
- Dates: 31 August 2021
- Competitors: 14 from 14 nations
- Winning time: 34:39.78

Medalists
1st place, gold medalist(s)		Darren Hicks	Australia
2nd place, silver medalist(s)		Ewoud Vromant	Belgium
3rd place, bronze medalist(s)		Alexandre Léauté	France

The men's time trial class C2 road cycling event at the 2020 Summer Paralympics took place on 31 August 2021 at the Fuji Speedway, Japan. 14 riders all from different nations competed in this event.

The C2 classification is for cyclists with moderate hemiplegic or diplegic spasticity; moderate athetosis or ataxia; unilateral above knee amputation, etcetera.

== Results ==
The event took place on 31 August 2021, at 8:00:

Rank	Rider	Nationality	Time	Deficit
1st place, gold medalist(s)	Darren Hicks	Australia	34:39.78	
2nd place, silver medalist(s)	Ewoud Vromant	Belgium	36:11.79	+1:32.01
3rd place, bronze medalist(s)	Alexandre Léauté	France	37:07.16	+2:27.38
4	Liang Guihua	China	37:17.09	+2:37.31
5	Arslan Gilmutdinov	RPC	37:23.02	+2:43.24
6	Israel Hilario Rimas	Peru	37:25.86	+2:46.08
7	Nikolaos Papangelis	Greece	37:55.05	+3:15.27
8	Ivo Koblasa	Czech Republic	38:23.17	+3:43.39
9	Shota Kawamoto	Japan	39:08.26	+4:28.48
10	Mohamed Lahna	Morocco	41:48.39	+7:08.61
11	Telmo Pinao	Portugal	41:56.90	+7:17.12
12	Victor Hugo Garrido Marquez	Venezuela	44:23.24	+9:43.46
13	Eduard Mihaita Moescu	Romania	43:11.18	+9:53.58
14	Ahmad Mubarak Almansoori	United Arab Emirates	48:23.08	+13:43.30
