= Peru at the 1976 Summer Paralympics =

- IPC code: PER
- NPC: National Paralympic Committee Peru

in Toronto
- Medals Ranked 29th: Gold 1 Silver 0 Bronze 2 Total 3

Summer Paralympics appearances (overview)
- 1972; 1976; 1980–1992; 1996; 2000; 2004; 2008; 2012; 2016; 2020; 2024

Peru sent a delegation to compete at the 1976 Summer Paralympics in Toronto, Canada. Its athletes finished twenty-ninth in the overall medal count.

== Medalists ==
Medal	Name	Sport	Event
Bronze	Teresa Chiappo	Athletics	Women's Javelin D
Gold	Teresa Chiappo	Table tennis	Women's Singles D
Bronze	José González Mugaburu	Swimming	Men's 100 m Backstroke 5

=== Medals by sport ===
Medals by sport
Sport	1st place, gold medalist(s)	2nd place, silver medalist(s)	3rd place, bronze medalist(s)	Total
Athletics	0	0	1	1
Swimming	0	0	1	1
Table Tennis	1	0	0	1
Total	1	0	2	3

=== Medals by gender ===
Medals by gender
Gender	1st place, gold medalist(s)	2nd place, silver medalist(s)	3rd place, bronze medalist(s)	Total
Female	1	0	1	2
Male	0	0	1	1
Mixed	0	0	0	0
Total	1	0	2	3

== Competitors ==
The following is the list of number of competitors in the Games. Only athletes that appear in the official results books in the section of final results are included here and counted towards participant statistics. The exact number of athletes is currently unknown. Teresa Chiappo competed in two sports, Athletics and Table tennis.

Sport	Men	Women	Total
Athletics	0	1	1
Swimming	1	0	1
Table tennis	0	1	1
Total	1	1	2

== Athletics ==
Key
- Note–Ranks given for track events are within the athlete's heat only
- Q = Qualified for the next round
- q = Qualified for the next round as a fastest loser or, in field events, by position without achieving the qualifying target
- DQ = Disqualified
- PR = Paralympic Record
- AR = Area (or continental) Record
- NR = National Record
- SB = Season's Best
- N/A = Round not applicable for the event
- Bye = Athlete not required to compete in round

Field events
Women

Athlete	Event	Result	Rank
Teresa Chiappo	Javelin D	12.72	3rd place, bronze medalist(s)
Teresa Chiappo	Precision Javelin D	18	6
Teresa Chiappo	Shot Put D	5.64	4

== Swimming ==
=== Men's events ===
Athlete	Events	Heats		Final	
Athlete	Events	Time	Rank	Time	Rank
José González Mugaburu	100 m backstroke 5	1:26.71	4 Q	1:25.37	3rd place, bronze medalist(s)
José González Mugaburu	100 m breaststroke 5	1:52.76	5 Q	1:51.03	4
José González Mugaburu	100 m freestyle 5	1:22.02	13	Did not advance	13
José González Mugaburu	100 m individual medley 5	2:31.12	8 Q	2:36.93	8

== Table tennis ==
Athlete	Event	Final	
Athlete	Event	Opposition Result	Rank
Teresa Chiappo	Women's Singles D	Pidskalny (CAN); W 1–0	1st place, gold medalist(s)

== See also ==
- 1976 Summer Paralympics
- Peru at the 1976 Summer Olympics
