= Peru at the 2016 Summer Paralympics =

- IPC code: PER
- NPC: National Paralympic Committee Peru

in Rio de Janeiro
- Competitors: 6 in 2 sports
- Medals: Gold 0 Silver 0 Bronze 0 Total 0

Summer Paralympics appearances (overview)
- 1972; 1976; 1980–1992; 1996; 2000; 2004; 2008; 2012; 2016; 2020; 2024

Peru competed at the 2016 Summer Paralympics in Rio de Janeiro, Brazil, from 7 to 18 September 2016.

== Disability classifications ==
Every participant at the Paralympics has their disability grouped into one of five disability categories; amputation, the condition may be congenital or sustained through injury or illness; cerebral palsy; wheelchair athletes, there is often overlap between this and other categories; visual impairment, including blindness; Les autres, any physical disability that does not fall strictly under one of the other categories, for example dwarfism or multiple sclerosis. Each Paralympic sport then has its own classifications, dependent upon the specific physical demands of competition. Events are given a code, made of numbers and letters, describing the type of event and classification of the athletes competing. Some sports, such as athletics, divide athletes by both the category and severity of their disabilities, other sports, for example swimming, group competitors from different categories together, the only separation being based on the severity of the disability.

== Athletics ==
Men's Track and Road

Athlete	Events	Heat		Final	
Athlete	Events	Time	Rank	Time	Rank
Carlos Felipa	100 m T42	15.38	7	did not advance	
Jose Luis Casas	200 m T43-44	26.91	7	did not advance	
Jose Luis Casas	400 m T43-44	Disqualified		did not advance	
Luis Sandoval (Guide – Jhon Cusi Huaman)	1500 m T11	4:28.41	4	did not advance	
Efrain Sotacuro	Marathon T45-46	—N/a		2:55:27	4

Field

Athlete	Events	Result	Rank
Carlos Felipa	Long Jump F42	4.10	8

Women's Track

Athlete	Events	Heat		Final	
Athlete	Events	Time	Rank	Time	Rank
Yeny Vargas	200 m T45-47	31.49	4	did not advance	
Yeny Vargas	400 m T45-47	1:09.23	4 Q	1:09.63	7

== Cycling ==
With one pathway for qualification being one highest ranked NPCs on the UCI Para-Cycling male and female Nations Ranking Lists on 31 December 2014, Peru qualified for the 2016 Summer Paralympics in Rio, assuming they continued to meet all other eligibility requirements.

=== Road ===
Athlete	Event	Time	Rank
Israel Hilario Rimas	Men's road time trial C2	28:55.08	6
Israel Hilario Rimas	Men's road race C1-3	1:51:48	12

== See also ==
- Peru at the 2016 Summer Olympics
