= Shota Kawamoto =

Japanese para-cyclist (born 1996)

Personal information
- Native name: 川本翔大
- Born: 19 August 1996 (age 30) Miyoshi, Hiroshima, Japan

Sport
- Sport: Para-cycling
- Disability class: C2
Medal record
Men's para-cycling
Representing Japan
Track World Championships
Silver medal – second place	2022 Saint-Quentin-en-Yvelines	Time trial C2
Silver medal – second place	2022 Saint-Quentin-en-Yvelines	Omnium C2
Silver medal – second place	2022 Saint-Quentin-en-Yvelines	Individual pursuit C2
Silver medal – second place	2023 Glasgow	Time trial C2
Silver medal – second place	2023 Glasgow	Omnium C2
Silver medal – second place	2023 Glasgow	Individual pursuit C2
Silver medal – second place	2024 Rio de Janeiro	Scratch race C2
Silver medal – second place	2024 Rio de Janeiro	Omnium C2
Silver medal – second place	2026 Apeldoorn	Elimination C2
Bronze medal – third place	2024 Rio de Janeiro	Time trial C2
Bronze medal – third place	2024 Rio de Janeiro	Individual pursuit C2
Bronze medal – third place	2025 Rio de Janeiro	Elimination C2
Bronze medal – third place	2026 Apeldoorn	Scratch race C2
Asian Para Games
Gold medal – first place	2022 Hangzhou	Individual pursuit C2
Gold medal – first place	2026 Aichi–Nagoya	Individual pursuit C2
Silver medal – second place	2018 Jakarta	Road time trial C1–2
Bronze medal – third place	2018 Jakarta	Individual pursuit C1–2
Bronze medal – third place	2018 Jakarta	Kilo C1–2–3
Bronze medal – third place	2022 Hangzhou	Road time trial C1–3
Bronze medal – third place	2022 Hangzhou	Track time trial C1–3

Shota Kawamoto (川本 翔大, Kawamoto Shota; born 19 August 1996) is a Japanese para-cyclist who competes in road and track events.

== Career ==
In October 2018, Kawamoto represented Japan at the 2018 Asian Para Games in cycling and won a silver medal in the road time trial C1–2 and bronze medals in the kilo C1–2–3 and individual pursuit C1–2 events.

Kawamoto represented Japan at the 2020 Summer Paralympics and finished in fourth place in the individual pursuit C2 event, and sixth place in the time trial C1–3 event. He also competed in road cycling and finished in ninth place in the time trial C2 and 28th place in the road race C1–3 event.

In August 2023, he competed at the 2023 UCI Para-cycling Track World Championships and won silver medals in the time trial and omnium, and a bronze medal in the individual pursuit C2 events. In October 2023, he then competed at the 2022 Asian Para Games in cycling and won a gold medal in the individual pursuit, and bronze medals in the road time trial C1–3 and track time trial C1–3 events.

In March 2024, he represented Japan at the 2024 UCI Para-cycling Track World Championships and won silver medals in the scratch race and omnium, and bronze medals in the individual pursuit and time trial C5 events. In September 2024, he then competed at the 2024 Summer Paralympics in track cycling and again finished in fourth place in the individual pursuit C2 event, and sixth place in the time trial C1–3 event. He also competed in road cycling and finished in eighth place in the time trial C2 and 20th place in the road race C1–3 event.
