= Cameroon at the 2020 Summer Paralympics =

- Flag of Cameroon
- IPC code: CMR

in Tokyo, Japan August 24, 2021 – September 5, 2021
- Competitors: 3 (1 man and 2 women) in 2 sports
- Medals: Gold 0 Silver 0 Bronze 0 Total 0

Summer Paralympics appearances (overview)
- 2012; 2016; 2020; 2024

Cameroon competed at the 2020 Summer Paralympics in Tokyo, Japan, from 24 August to 5 September 2021. This was their third consecutive appearance at the Summer Paralympics since 2012.

== Competitors ==
The following is the list of number of competitors participating in the Games:

Sport	Men	Women	Total
Athletics	1	1	2
Powerlifting	0	1	1
Total	1	2	3

== Athletics ==
Men's track

Athlete	Event	Heats		Semi-final		Final	
Athlete	Event	Result	Rank	Result	Rank	Result	Rank
Guillaume Junior Atangana	100m T11	11.52	3	Did not advance	Did not advance	Did not advance	Did not advance
Guillaume Junior Atangana	400m T11	52.40	1 Q	—N/a		52.17	4

Women's track

Athlete	Event	Heats		Semi-final		Final	
Athlete	Event	Result	Rank	Result	Rank	Result	Rank
Judith Mariette Lebog	100m T11	Disqualified	Disqualified	Did not advance	Did not advance	did not advance	Did not advance
Judith Mariette Lebog	200m T11	26.95	2 Q	26.90	4	Did not advance	Did not advance

== Powerlifting ==
Women

Athlete	Event	Result	Rank
Mimozette Nghamsi Fotie	−45 kg	NMR	NMR

== See also ==
- Cameroon at the Paralympics
- Cameroon at the 2020 Summer Olympics
