= Peru at the 2024 Summer Paralympics =

- IPC code: PER
- NPC: National Paralympic Association of Peru

in Paris, France August 28, 2024 – September 8, 2024
- Competitors: 13 in 9 sports
- Flag bearers (opening): Jorge Arcela; Pilar Jáuregui
- Flag bearer (closing): Leonor Espinoza
- Medals Ranked 65th: Gold 1 Silver 0 Bronze 0 Total 1

Summer Paralympics appearances (overview)
- 1972; 1976; 1980–1992; 1996; 2000; 2004; 2008; 2012; 2016; 2020; 2024

Peru competed at the 2024 Summer Paralympics in Paris, France, from 28 August to 8 September.

== Medalists ==
Medal	Name	Sport	Event	Date
Gold	Leonor Espinoza	Taekwondo	Women's 47 kg	29 August

=== Medals by sport ===
Medals by sport
Sport	1st place, gold medalist(s)	2nd place, silver medalist(s)	3rd place, bronze medalist(s)	Total
Taekwondo	1	0	0	1
Total	1	0	0	1

=== Medals by gender ===
Medals by gender
Gender	1st place, gold medalist(s)	2nd place, silver medalist(s)	3rd place, bronze medalist(s)	Total
Female	1	0	0	1
Male	0	0	0	0
Mixed	0	0	0	0
Total	1	0	0	1

=== Medals by date ===
Medals by date
Date	1st place, gold medalist(s)	2nd place, silver medalist(s)	3rd place, bronze medalist(s)	Total
29 August	1	0	0	1
Total	1	0	0	1

== Competitors ==
The following is the list of number of competitors in the Games.

Sport	Men	Women	Total
Archery	0	1	1
Athletics	1	1	2
Badminton	0	3	3
Boccia	0	1	1
Cycling	1	0	1
Powerlifting	1	0	1
Shooting	1	0	1
Swimming	1	1	2
Taekwondo	0	1	1
Total	5	8	13

== Archery ==
Peru entered one female archers into the games by virtue of his result at the 2023 Parapan American Games in Santiago, Chile.

Athlete	Event	Ranking Round		Round of 32	Round of 16	Quarterfinals	Semifinals	Finals	
Athlete	Event	Score	Seed	Opposition Score	Opposition Score	Opposition Score	Opposition Score	Opposition Score	Rank
Daniela Campos	Women's individual recurve	459	22	Kliem (GER); L 2–6	Did not advance				17

== Athletics ==
Peruvian athletes achieved quota places for the following events based on their results at the 2023 World Championships, 2024 World Championships, or through high performance allocation, as long as they meet the minimum entry standard (MES).

Key
- Note–Ranks given for track events are within the athlete's heat only
- Q = Qualified for the next round
- q = Qualified for the next round as a fastest loser or, in field events, by position without achieving the qualifying target
- DQ = Disqualified
- PR = Paralympic Record
- AR = Area (or continental) Record
- NR = National Record
- SB = Season's Best
- N/A = Round not applicable for the event
- Bye = Athlete not required to compete in round

Track & road events
Men

Athlete	Event	Final	
Athlete	Event	Time	Rank
Rosbil Guillen; Guide:José Luis Rojas Ramos	Men's 5000 metres T11	15:28.62	6
Rosbil Guillen; Guide:José Luis Rojas Ramos	Marathon T12	DQ	

1. R49.6(b) - Athlete must cross the finish line in front of the guide runner. Time before disqualification was 2:38:44.

Women

Athlete	Event	Heat		Final	
Athlete	Event	Time	Rank	Time	Rank
Neri Mamani	1500 m T11	4:59.74	7	Did not advance	7

== Badminton ==
Peru has qualified three female para badminton players for the following events, through the release of BWF para-badminton Race to Paris Paralympic Ranking.

Athlete	Event	Group Stage				Semifinal	Final / BM	
Athlete	Event	Opposition Score	Opposition Score	Opposition Score	Rank	Opposition Score	Opposition Score	Rank
Pilar Jáuregui	Women's singles WH2	Li H (CHN); L 1–2	Renggli (SUI); L 1–2	Yang (TPE); W 2–0	3	Did not advance		7
Giuliana Póveda	Women's singles SH6	Marlina (INA); L 1–2	Saeyang (THA); W 2–0	Li F (CHN); L 0–2	3	Did not advance		7
Rubí Fernández	Women's singles SH6	Szmigiel (POL); L 0–2	Choong (GBR); L 1–2	—N/a	3	Did not advance		7

== Boccia ==
Peru confirmed one at competitor via Bipartite invitation allocation in women's individual BC3 events.

Athlete	Event	Pool matches				Quarterfinals	Semifinals	Final / BM	
Athlete	Event	Opposition Score	Opposition Score	Opposition Score	Rank	Opposition Score	Opposition Score	Opposition Score	Rank
Niurka Callupe	Women's individual BC3	Ichinoe (JPN); L 1–5	Ferrando (ARG); L 2–3	Ntenta (GRE); L 4–5	4	Did not advance			

== Cycling ==
Peru entered one male para-cyclist after finished the top eligible nation's at the 2022 UCI Nation's ranking allocation ranking.

Athlete	Event	Time	Rank
Israel Hilario Rimas	Men's road time trial C2	21:28.46	6
Israel Hilario Rimas	Men's road race C1-3	DNF	

== Powerlifting ==
Athlete	Event	Total lifted	Rank
Diego Quispe	Men's -59 kg	130	9

== Shooting ==
Peru entered one para-shooter after achieved quota places for the following events by virtue of their best finishes at the 2022, 2023 and 2024 world cup, 2022 World Championships and 2023 World Championships, as long as they obtained a minimum qualifying score (MQS) by July 15, 2024.

Athlete	Event	Qualification		Final	
Athlete	Event	Points	Rank	Points	Rank
Jorge Arcela	R1 – men's 10 m air rifle standing SH1	609.7	15	Did not advanced	15
Jorge Arcela	R3 – mixed 10 m air rifle prone SH1	629.4	24	Did not advanced	24
Jorge Arcela	R6 – mixed 50 m air rifle prone SH1	615.7	24	Did not advanced	24

== Swimming ==
=== Men's events ===
Athlete	Events	Heats		Final	
Athlete	Events	Time	Rank	Time	Rank
Rodrigo Santillán	50 m backstroke S2	1:08.08	7 Q	1:07.60	7
Rodrigo Santillán	100 m backstroke S2	2:16.35	5 Q	2:18.61	6
Rodrigo Santillán	200 m freestyle S2	4:44.25	7 Q	4:39.26	6

=== Women's events ===
Athlete	Events	Heats		Final	
Athlete	Events	Time	Rank	Time	Rank
Dunia Felices	200 m medley SM5	4:30.17	18	Did not advance	18

== Taekwondo ==
Peru entered one athletes to compete at the Paralympics competition. Leonor Espinoza qualified for Paris 2024, by virtue of finishing within the top six in the Paralympic rankings in women's 47 kg class.

Athlete	Event	First round	Quarterfinals	Semifinals	Repechage 1	Repechage 2	Final / BM	
Athlete	Event	Opposition Result	Opposition Result	Opposition Result	Opposition Result	Opposition Result	Opposition Result	Rank
Leonor Espinoza	Women's –47 kg	Chemogne (CMR); W 28–9	Abdollahpour (IRI); W 19–9	Laarif (MAR); WWD	—N/a	—N/a	Isakova (UZB); W 10–4	1st place, gold medalist(s)

== See also ==
- Peru at the 2024 Summer Olympics
- Peru at the Paralympics
