= Darren Hicks =

Australian Paralympic cyclist

Darren Hicks OAM
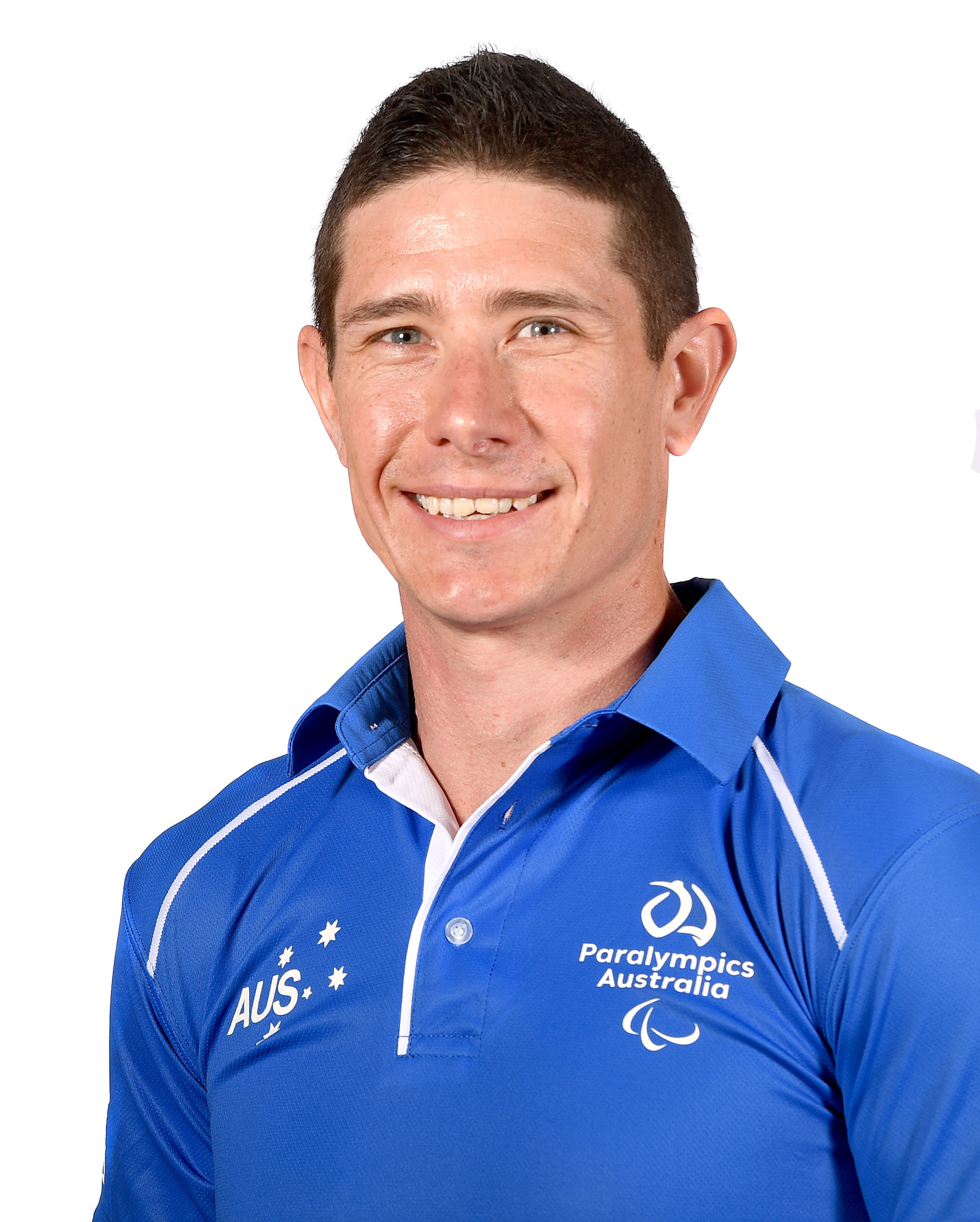
- Darren Hicks in 2019

Personal information
- Nationality: Australian
- Born: 23 December 1984 (age 41)

Sport
- Country: Australia
- Sport: Cycling
- Disability class: C2
Medal record
Cycling
Paralympic Games
Gold medal – first place	2020 Tokyo	Time trial C2
Silver medal – second place	2020 Tokyo	Individual pursuit C2
Bronze medal – third place	2024 Paris	Time trial C2
Road World Championships
Gold medal – first place	2019 Emmen	Time trial C2
Silver medal – second place	2017 Pietermaritzburg	Road race C2
Silver medal – second place	2017 Pietermaritzburg	Time trial C2
Silver medal – second place	2023 Glasgow	Time trial C2
Silver medal – second place	2023 Glasgow	Road race C2
Silver medal – second place	2025 Ronse	Time trial C2
Bronze medal – third place	2018 Maniago	Road race C2
Bronze medal – third place	2022 Baie-Comeau	Time trial C2
Track World Championships
Gold medal – first place	2019 Apeldoorn	3km individual pursuit C2
Silver medal – second place	2018 Rio de Janeiro	Scratch race C1-3
Silver medal – second place	2022 Saint-Quentin-en-Yvelines	Scratch Race C2
Silver medal – second place	2023 Glasgow	Individual Pursuit C2
Bronze medal – third place	2026 Apeldoorn	Elimination C2

Darren Michael Hicks OAM (born 3 December 1984) is an Australian Paralympic cyclist who has won medals at several World Road and Track Championships. At the 2020 Tokyo Paralympics, he won a gold and a silver medal and a bronze medal at the 2024 Paris Paralympics.

His right leg was amputated above the knee as a consequence of a road crash in 2014.

== Personal ==
Hicks was born 23 December 1984. In August 2014, he was driving a sewage waste truck downhill on Adelaide's South Eastern Freeway. He lost control of the truck due to faulty brakes and the resulting crash at Glen Osmond killed two people. A report prepared for the court in 2017 concluded the truck's brakes were faulty and that neither Hicks nor Cleanaway were aware and police charges were dropped in January 2019. The accident result in Hicks having his right leg amputated. Hicks had held his heavy vehicle licence for a month, and it was his fifth day working for that employer. It was the first day he had been alone on the job, and he was assigned an older, different model of truck than he had driven before. In December 2019, he told the court (in proceedings against his former employer) that he had not been asked if he knew how to drive a manual truck down that long descent. The truck's brakes failed, and it collided with three cars waiting at traffic lights at the end of the freeway. Two people were killed, another left with serious injuries, and Hicks' leg was amputated to extract him from the wreckage of the truck.

== Cycling ==
Hicks is classified as a C2 cyclist. His first major international competition was the 2017 UCI Para-cycling Road World Championships, Pietermaritzburg, South Africa where he won silver medals in the Men's Time Trial C2 and the Men's Road Race C2. At the 2018 UCI Para-cycling Track World Championships in Rio de Janeiro, Brazil, Hicks won the silver medal in the Men's Scratch Race C1-3. He won the bronze medal in the Men's Road Race C2 at the 2018 UCI Para-cycling Road World Championships, Maniago, Italy. He finished fourth in the Men's C2 Time Trial.

At the 2019 UCI Para-cycling Track World Championships in Apeldoorn, Netherlands, he won the gold medal in the Men's 3 km Pursuit C2.

At the 2020 UCI Para-cycling Track World Championships in Milton, Ontario, he finished fourth in the Men's 3 km Pursuit C2 and ninth in the Men's Scratch Race C2.

At the 2020 Summer Paralympics, Hicks won the gold medal in the Men's Road Time Trial C2 with a time of 34:39.78. He also won a silver medal in the Men's 3km Pursuit C2 with a time of 3:35.064, less than 4 seconds behind Alexandre Léauté of France who broke the world record. In the Men's Road Race C1-3, he finished twelfth.

Hicks won the bronze medal in the Men's Time Trial C3 and finished 5th in the Men's Road Race C3 2022 UCI Para-cycling Road World Championships in Baie-Comeau.

At the 2022 UCI Para-cycling Track World Championships in Saint-Quentin-en-Yvelines, France, he won the silver medal in Men's Scratch C2

At 2024 Paris Paralympics, he won the bronze medal in the Men's road time trial C2, finished fifth in the Men's Individual pursuit C2 and thirteenth in the Men's road race C1-3. At the 2025 UCI Para-cycling Road World Championships in Ronse, he won the silver medal in the Men's Time Trial C2 and seventh in the Men' s Road Race C2.

== Recognition ==
- 2018 - South Australian Sports Institute Athlete of the Year with a Disability.
- 2019 - Cycling Australia Para Male Road Cyclist of the Year.
- 2022 – Medal of the Order of Australia for service to sport as a gold medallist at the Tokyo Paralympic Games 2020
- 2022 - AusCycling Men's Track Para-cyclist of the Year
- 2023 - AusCycling Men's Road & Track Para-cyclist of the Year
- 2025 - AusCycling Men's Road Para-cyclist of the Year
