= Anthony Ulonnam =

Nigerian Paralympic powerlifter

Sport
- Country: Nigeria
- Sport: Paralympic powerlifting
Medal record
Paralympic Games
Silver medal – second place	2012 London	56 kg

Anthony Ulonnam is a Nigerian Paralympic powerlifter. He represented Nigeria at the 2012 Summer Paralympics held in London, United Kingdom and he won the silver medal in the men's 56 kg event.

He represented Nigeria at the 2010 Commonwealth Games and he won the silver medal in the men's Open bench press event.

At the 2014 World Championships he won the bronze medal in the men's 59 kg event.

At the 2015 African Games he won the silver medal in the men's 59 kg event.
