= Powerlifting at the 2012 Summer Paralympics – Men's 56 kg =

Powerlifting – Men's 56 kg at the XIV Paralympic Games
- Venue: ExCeL London
- Date: 31 August 2012
- Competitors: 11 from 11 nations
- Winning lift: 197 kg

Medalists
1st place, gold medalist(s)		Sherif Othman	Egypt
2nd place, silver medalist(s)		Anthony Ulonnam	Nigeria
3rd place, bronze medalist(s)		Jian Wang	China

The men's 56 kg powerlifting event at the 2012 Summer Paralympics was contested on 31 August at ExCeL London.

== Records ==
Prior to the competition, the existing world and Paralympic records were as follows.

World record	206.5 kg	Sherif Othman (EGY)	Dubai, United Arab Emirates	23 February 2012
Paralympic record	202.5 kg	Sherif Othman (EGY)	Beijing, China	11 September 2008

== Results ==
Rank	Name	Group	Body weight (kg)	Attempts (kg)				Result (kg)
Rank	Name	Group	Body weight (kg)	1	2	3	4	Result (kg)
1st place, gold medalist(s)	Sherif Othman (EGY)	A	55.39	197.0	~~205.0~~	~~205.0~~	–	197.0
2nd place, silver medalist(s)	Anthony Ulonnam (NGR)	B	55.37	184.0	188.0	~~189.0~~	–	188.0
3rd place, bronze medalist(s)	Jian Wang (CHN)	A	55.50	181.0	185.0	~~189.0~~	–	185.0
4	Ali Jawad (GBR)	A	55.64	180.0	185.0	~~189.0~~	–	185.0
5	Ildar Bedderdinov (RUS)	A	55.40	169.0	174.0	~~182.0~~	–	174.0
6	Amir Jafari (IRI)	A	55.90	173.0	~~182.0~~	~~186.0~~	–	173.0
7	Narong Kasanun (THA)	B	55.17	162.0	~~175.0~~	~~175.0~~	–	162.0
8	Abebe Fekadu (AUS)	B	55.21	158.0	~~163.0~~	~~163.0~~	–	158.0
9	Conrat Frederic Atangana (CMR)	B	54.09	150.0	155.0	~~162.0~~	–	155.0
10	Turan Mutlu (TUR)	B	55.42	150.0	~~158.0~~	~~158.0~~	–	150.0
-	Hasan Al-Tameemi (IRQ)	B	55.84	~~155.0~~	~~155.0~~	~~155.0~~	–	NMR

Key: PR=Paralympic record; WR=World record; NMR=No marks recorded
