= Peru at the 2012 Summer Paralympics =

- IPC code: PER
- NPC: National Paralympic Committee Peru

in London
- Competitors: 1 in 1 sport
- Medals: Gold 0 Silver 0 Bronze 0 Total 0

Summer Paralympics appearances (overview)
- 1972; 1976; 1980–1992; 1996; 2000; 2004; 2008; 2012; 2016; 2020; 2024

Peru competed at the 2012 Summer Paralympics in London, United Kingdom from August 29 to September 9, 2012.

== Athletics ==
Men’s Field Events

Athlete	Event	Final	
Athlete	Event	Distance	Rank
Pompilio Falconi-Alvarez	Discus Throw F35-36	31.08	10

== See also ==
- Peru at the 2012 Summer Olympics
