= Matthew Robertson (cyclist) =

British Paralympic cyclist

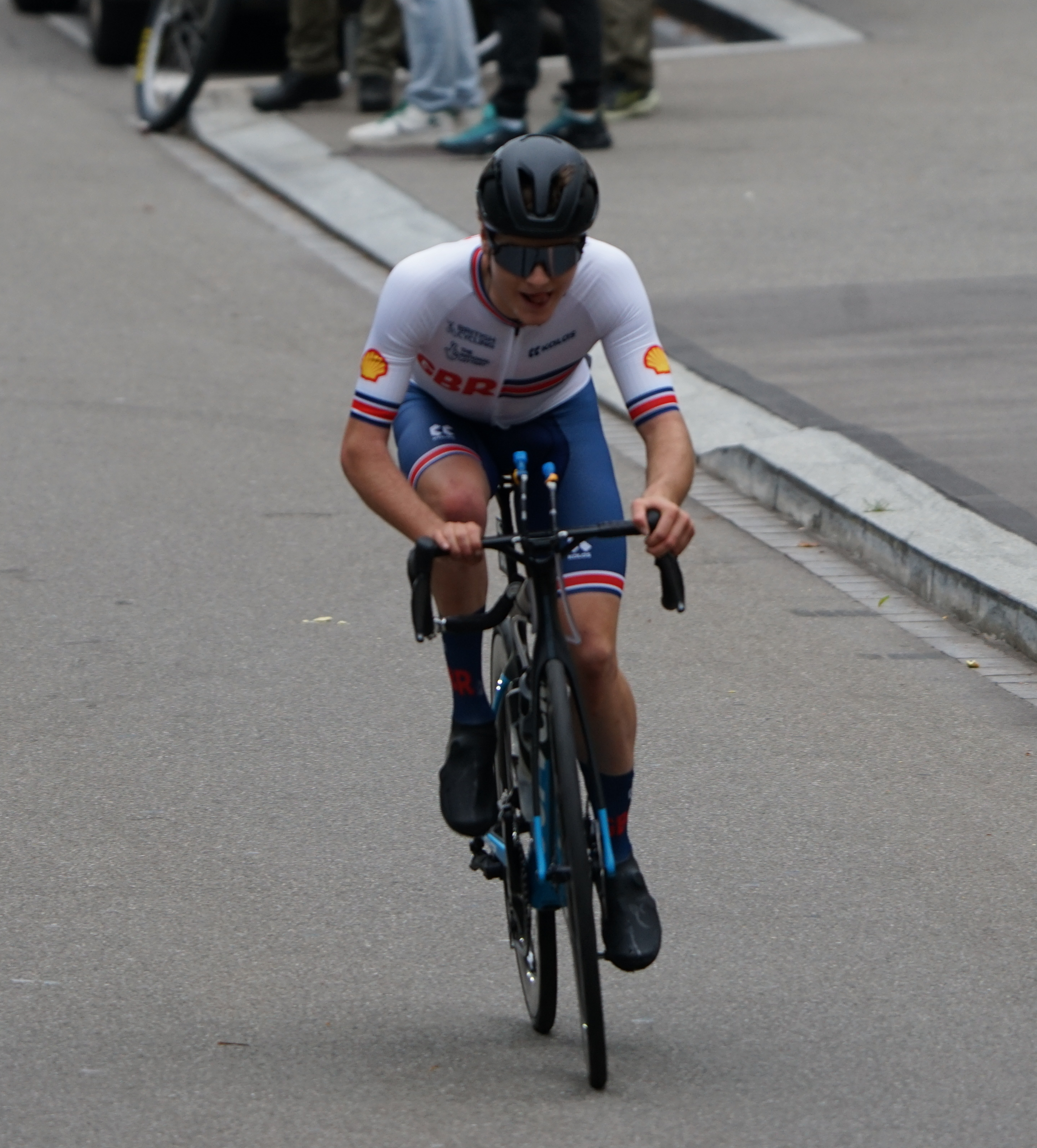
- Robertson in 2024

Medal record

Men's para-cycling

Representing Great Britain

Paralympic Games
Bronze medal – third place	2024 Paris	Pursuit C2

Road World Championships
Silver medal – second place	2024 Zurich	Road race C2
Bronze medal – third place	2024 Zurich	Time trial C2

Track World Championships
Bronze medal – third place	2024 Rio de Janeiro	Omnium C2
Bronze medal – third place	2025 Rio de Janeiro	Scratch race C2

European Road Championships
Silver medal – second place	2022 Upper Austria	Road race C2
Bronze medal – third place	2022 Upper Austria	Time trial C2

Matthew Robertson (born 24 May 1999) is a British para-cyclist, who won bronze in the Pursuit C2 at the 2024 Summer Paralympics in Paris.

He won gold in the C1-C3 individual pursuit at the 2026 Commonwealth Games.

== Major results ==
2022
UEC Road Para-Cycling European Championships

2nd Road race C2
3rd Time trial C2

2024
UCI Para-cycling Road World Championships

2nd Road race C2
2nd Time trial C2

UCI Para-cycling Track World Championships

3rd Omnium C2

Paralympic Games

3rd Pursuit C2

2025
National Para-cycling Track Championships

1st 1km time trial C2
1st Individual pursuit C2
