= Christian Gobe =

Cameroonian Paralympic athlete

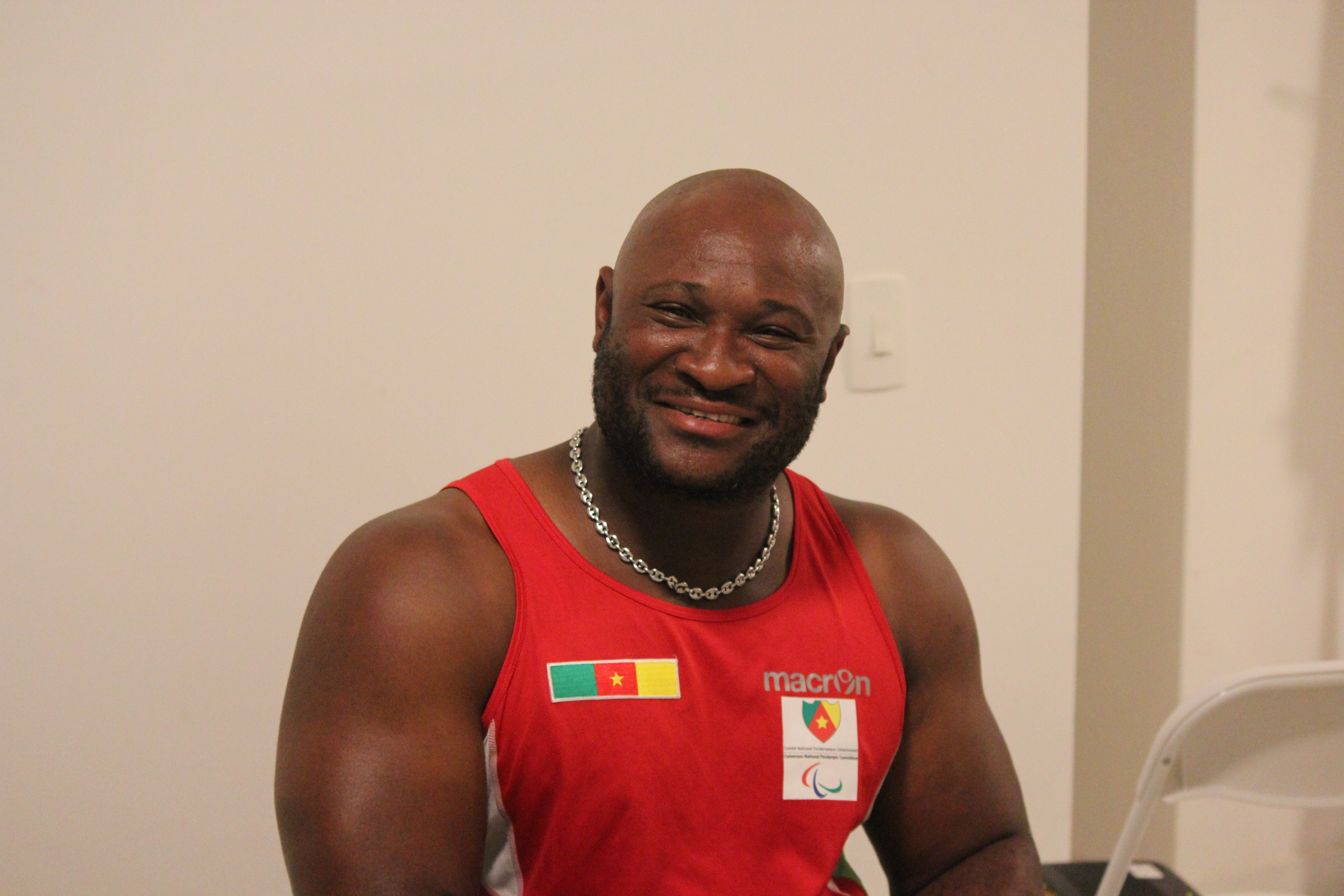

Personal information
- Nationality: Cameroonian
- Born: 13 May 1977 (age 49)

Sport
- Country: Cameroon
- Sport: Athletics (track)
- Disability: Paralysis
- Disability class: T54
- Event(s): Shot put, discus, javelin, 100m, 200m
- Coached by: Carla Rhymer

Achievements and titles
- Paralympic finals: 2012
Medal record
Track and field (T54)
Representing Cameroon
All Africa Games
Gold medal – first place	2015 Brazzaville, Congo	Shot put —F54-57
IPC Grand Prix
Gold medal – first place	2015 Nottwil	Shot put —F55
Gold medal – first place	2016 Nottwil	Shot put —F55
Gold medal – first place	2016 Dubai	Shot put —F55
Wheelchair basketball
Representing Switzerland
IWBF European B Championship
Bronze medal – third place	2005 Brno, Czech Republic	Team

Christian Gobe (born 13 May 1977 in Cameroon) is a Paralympian from Cameroon who represented his country at the 2016 Summer Paralympics, finishing eighth in the Shot Put - F55 event.

Gobe contracted polio as a child, and took up sport as part of his rehabilitation efforts. He later moved to Switzerland to attend University of Geneva. While there, he became a Swiss national, got married and had three children.

As a para-athlete, Gobe specializes in T54 100m and 200m events, while also competing in T54 400m, F55 shot put, javelin and discus. Gobe first took up the sport in 1998, and continued with it after moving to Switzerland. Initially representing Cameroon, he became a Swiss national and tried to make the team for the 2008 Games. He switched back to Cameroonian nationality to try to make the a team for 2012 Summer Paralympic but passport issues kept him out despite being named to the team. He successfully made and was Cameroon's sole representative at the 2016 Summer Paralympics. Gobe holds the continental record for the F55 shot put, having broken his own record several times in 2015 and 2016.

Outside of athletics, Gobe is also involved in wheelchair basketball. He played for the Switzerland men's national wheelchair basketball team, and for several clubs in Switzerland. As a member of the Swiss team, he won a bronze medal at the 2006 IWBF Men's B European Championships. He also is involved in the sport as a wheelchair basketball coach.

== Personal ==
Gobe was born on 13 May 1977. He contracted polio when he was a 4-year-old. Complications related to the illness left him with a physical disability that required use of a wheelchair. He took up sports at the rehabilitation center at Etoug-Ebe in Yaoundé, with his participation largely being recreational and non-competitive.

He first went to Switzerland in 2000, where he attended the University of Geneva and worked on a Bachelor of Arts in Communications and Management. In 2002, Gobe permanently moved to Switzerland and acquired residency in the country. Despite being eligible to represent Switzerland, he made the decision to represent Cameroon as he believed it increased his chances of competing at the Paralympic Games.

Gobe is married to a Swiss national and has three children.

== Athletics ==
Cameroon Paralympian Christian Gobe explains who he is in French.

Gobe is coached by Switzerland's Carla Rhymer. On the national level, he is coached by Switzerland's Joakim Helmer. He started in athletics when he was four-years old, after acquiring a disability as a result of complications related to contracting polio. His best international performance was a gold medal at the 2015 All-Africa Games in Brazzaville, Congo where he won gold in the F54-57 shot put. He competes in a number of different track disciplines including the T54 100m, 200m and 400m, F55 shot put, javelin and discus. His specialities are the sprint events, the 100m and 200m.

The Cameroonian started competitive athletics in 1998, after originally having been involved in the sport on the recreational level. He went on to claim Cameroon national titles from 1998 to 2000 in the 100m, 200m and 400m events. He participated in the 2008 edition of the Jeux de l'avenir pour personnes handicapées d'Afrique (Japhaf).

Gobe has competed at two previous IPC Athletics World Championships. The first was in 2006 in Assen, Netherlands where he competed in three events. His best finish was in the 4 × 400 m Relay — T53/54 where he finished sixth in a time of 3:33.50. He also had an eighth-place finish in the 4 × 100 m Relay T53-54 in a time of 57.56. He had an eighteenth-place finish in the 100m — T54 in a time of 15.68. His second world championships were the 2013 edition in Lyon, France where Gobe competed in five events. He had a pair of thirteenth-place finishes in the 100m event in a time of 15.65 seconds and the shot put with a distance of 9.4 meters. He had a sixteenth-place finish in the discus event with a distance of 25.26. In the javelin, he finished seventeenth with a throw of 17.29. His final event was the 200m, where he finished eighteenth in a time of 28.77 seconds.

Gobe represented Cameroon in May 2016 at the IPC Athletics Grand Prix, Nottwil, Switzerland, where he set an African record in the F55 men's shot put with a throw of 10.49 meters. The year before at the 2015 edition of the event, Gobe finished first in the men's F55 shot put with a best throw of 9.26 meters. Gobe was one of Cameroon's representatives at the 2016 edition of the IPC Athletics Grand Prix Dubai. He came away with gold in the men's F55 shot put after setting an African record with a throw of 10.78 meters. He also set a continental record in the shot put at the 2016 Sharjah International Open.

=== Results ===
Competition	Event	Result	Rank	Records	Ref
1998 Cameroon National Para-Athletics Championships	100m — T54		1		
1998 Cameroon National Para-Athletics Championships	200m — T54		1		
1998 Cameroon National Para-Athletics Championships	400m — T54		1		
1999 Cameroon National Para-Athletics Championships	100m — T54		1		
1999 Cameroon National Para-Athletics Championships	200m — T54		1		
1999 Cameroon National Para-Athletics Championships	400m — T54		1		
2000 Cameroon National Para-Athletics Championships	100m — T54		1		
2000 Cameroon National Para-Athletics Championships	200m — T54		1		
2000 Cameroon National Para-Athletics Championships	400m — T54		1		
2001 Swiss National Adaptive Athletics Championships			1		
2003 Swiss National Adaptive Athletics Championships			1		
2005 Swiss National Adaptive Athletics Championships			1		
2006 IPC Athletics World Championships	4 × 400 m Relay — T53/54	3:33.50	6		
2006 IPC Athletics World Championships	4 × 100 m Relay — T53-54	57.56	8		
2006 IPC Athletics World Championships	100m — T54	15.68	18		
2007 Swiss National Adaptive Athletics Championships	100m — T54		1		
2007 Swiss National Adaptive Athletics Championships	200m — T54		1		
2007 Swiss National Adaptive Athletics Championships	400m — T54		1		
2008 African Francophone Games for the Handicapped			1		
2008 Swiss National Adaptive Athletics Championships	100m — T54		1		
2009 Swiss National Adaptive Athletics Championships	100m — T54		2		
2010 Swiss National Adaptive Athletics Championships	100m — T54		2		
2010 Swiss National Adaptive Athletics Championships	200m — T54		2		
2010 Swiss National Adaptive Athletics Championships					
2013 IPC Athletics World Championships	100m — T54	15.65	13		
2013 IPC Athletics World Championships	Shot Put — F55	9.4 meters	13		
2013 IPC Athletics World Championships	Discus — F55	25.26 meters	16		
2013 IPC Athletics World Championships	Javelin — F55	17.29 meters	17		
2013 IPC Athletics World Championships	200m — T54	28.77	18		
2014 IPC Athletics Grand Prix Dubai	Shot Put — F55		2		
2015 All-Africa Games	Shot Put — F54-55		1		
2015 Fazaa International Athletics Competition	Shot Put — F54	9.19 meters	3	Continental	
2015 IPC Athletics Grand Prix Nottwil, Switzerland	Shot Put — F55	9.26 meters	1	Continental	
2016 IPC Athletics Grand Prix Nottwil, Switzerland	Shot Put — F55	10.49 meters	1	Continental	
2016 IPC Athletics Grand Prix Dubai	Shot Put — F55	10.78 meters	1	Continental	
2016 Sharjah International Open	Shot Put — F55	10.85 meters	1	Continental	
2016 Sharjah International Open	Discus — F55	27.57 meters	4		
2016 Summer Paralympics	Shot Put - F55	10.28 meters	8		

=== Paralympic Games ===
Gobe was on the short list of Swiss para-sports people who could have potentially earned nominations for the athletics team competing at the 2008 Summer Paralympics. National selectors in Switzerland though overlooked him and did not choose him to represent Switzerland at the 2008 Games. Despite being the top ranked sportsperson in his event, he was passed over with two lower ranked athletes chosen instead. With unclear explanations as to why Gobe was overlooked, following the Beijing Games, he contacted the Cameroon National Paralympic Committee about potentially representing Cameroon in international competitions.

Gobe was selected to represent Cameroon at the 2012 Summer Paralympics, but issues with nationality meant he could not compete. This situation was not made clear until shortly before the start of the London Games. Gobe had taken Swiss citizenship in order to represent Switzerland in wheelchair basketball. Cameroon does not allow dual nationality, and gaining Swiss nationality nullified his Cameroon passport. The lack of a Cameroon passport meant he could not represent Cameroon in London. He ended up attending the Games as an observer.

Cameroon sent one competitor to the 2016 Summer Paralympics, Christian Gobe. He competed in the men's F55 shot put event where he finished eighth in a twelve-deep field on a best throw of 10.28 meters. Gobe was his country's flag bearer for the Opening Ceremonies.

Ahead of the Rio Games, Gobe spent three years preparing to qualify and participate. The ability to be based in Europe gave him a competitive edge as he had access to better training and equipment than if he had been based in Africa. He was able to train daily, with many sessions being three hours long. Gobe also benefited by having as a sponsor Induni SA, a Swiss construction company, who has been with him since 2008. Lack of sponsorship was a hurdle for some of his countrymen who cannot afford the costs to compete at the elite level.

Athlete	Events	Result	Rank
Christian Gobe	Shot Put F55	10.28 meters	8

== Wheelchair basketball ==
Gobe has also been a member of Cameroon men's national wheelchair basketball team. He has coached the wheelchair basketball teams in Switzerland. He took up the sport after moving to Switzerland, and being invited to train with the Switzerland men's national wheelchair basketball team. Because of his skill, the national team assisted in fast tracking his residency and citizenship so he could be a member of the Swiss national team. As a member of the national team, he participated in a world championship and a European championship but he had issues of the level of play, as Switzerland was behind other European countries in their competitiveness. As a member of Swiss basketball team, he won a bronze medal at the European Men's B Championships in Brno, Czech Republic in 2006. Playing for Aigles de Meyrin in 2006, his team won the Swiss Cup. He was still with Aigles de Meryin in 2009, scoring 2 points in the team's 65 - 53 loss to Pilatus Dragons RCZS in the 2009 Swiss Cup. He was a key player in the team's success since he first joined them.
