= Arshad Shaik =

Indian para cyclist

Medal record

Men's para-cycling

Representing India

Asian Track Championships
Gold medal – first place	2024 New Delhi	1 km time trial C2
Gold medal – first place	2024 New Delhi	Scratch C2
Gold medal – first place	2024 New Delhi	Omnium C2
Gold medal – first place	2024 New Delhi	Individual pursuit C2

Arshad Shaik (Born 2 June 1993) is an Indian para cyclist from Andhra Pradesh. He qualified to represent India at the 2024 Summer Paralympics at Paris. In the Men's road time trial C2, he finished 11th at the Paris Paralympics with a time of 25:20.11 and finished 30th in the men's 1000m time trial C1-3 events. He will also take part in men's time trial C2 and men's road race C1-3.

== Life ==
Shaik is from Nandyal, in the erstwhile Andhra Pradesh. He met with an auto rickshaw accident in 2004 and his leg was amputated. He is a product of Hyderabad-based Aditya Mehta Foundation. The para athletes from the foundation met the chief minister A. Revanth Reddy and briefed him about the preparations for the Paralympics.
