= Cameroon at the 2016 Summer Paralympics =

- IPC code: CMR
- NPC: Cameroonian National Paralympic Committee

in Rio de Janeiro
- Competitors: 1 in 1 sports
- Flag bearer: Christian Gobe
- Medals: Gold 0 Silver 0 Bronze 0 Total 0

Summer Paralympics appearances (overview)
- 2012; 2016; 2020; 2024

Cameroon sent a delegation to compete at the 2016 Summer Paralympics in Rio de Janeiro, Brazil, from 7 to 18 September 2016. This was the nation's second appearance at a Summer Paralympic Games after it made its debut four years earlier at the 2012 Summer Paralympics. They were represented by one athlete, shot put thrower Christian Gobe, who contested one event, the men's shot put F55. In that competition, he finished eighth out of twelve athletes with a throw of 10.28 metres.

== Background ==
Cameroon made their second appearance in the Paralympic Games in Rio de Janeiro, with their Paralympic Games debut occurring four years prior in the 2012 Summer Paralympics in London. In contrast, Cameroon has been competing in the Olympic Games since the 1964 Summer Olympics. The 2016 Summer Paralympics were held from 7–18 September 2016 with a total of 4,328 athletes representing 159 National Paralympic Committees taking part. Cameroon sent one athlete to compete at the Rio de Janeiro Paralympics: shot put thrower Christian Gobe. He was accompanied by the president of the Cameroonian National Paralympic Committee Jean Jacques Ndoudoudmou and five other unnamed officials. Gobe was chosen as the flag bearer for the parade of nations during the opening ceremony.

== Disability classification ==
Every participant at the Paralympics has their disability grouped into one of five disability categories; amputation, the condition may be congenital or sustained through injury or illness; cerebral palsy; wheelchair athletes, there is often overlap between this and other categories; visual impairment, including blindness; Les autres, any physical disability that does not fall strictly under one of the other categories, for example dwarfism or multiple sclerosis. Each Paralympic sport then has its own classifications, dependent upon the specific physical demands of competition. Events are given a code, made of numbers and letters, describing the type of event and classification of the athletes competing. Some sports, such as athletics, divide athletes by both the category and severity of their disabilities, other sports, for example swimming, group competitors from different categories together, the only separation being based on the severity of the disability.

== Athletics ==
Cameroon Paralympian Christian Gobe explains who he is in French.

Christian Gobe contracted polio at the age of four and the complications of the disease left him disabled and he has used a wheelchair since. He was 39 years old at the time of the Rio Summer Paralympics and it was his debut in the competition. Gobe qualified for the Games by meeting the "B" qualifying standard for the men's shot put F55 event. He spent as much as three hours per day training and preparing for the Games in the three years leading up to the competition and he was based in Switzerland which allowed him to improve his skills than if he was based in Africa due to better equipment and coaches. Before the Paralympics, Gobe said he felt it was his responsibility to be in Rio de Janeiro and he wanted to demonstrate to others that people with disabilities can play sport, "Come see us, you will realize that sometimes we provide more efforts than valid to achieve our goals.", and, "Sport is also a means of social integration. Being there, being seen on TV, talking about us is important! We do not want to stay in the corner lamenting." He competed in the men's shot put F55 competition on 16 September. Gobe finished eighth out of twelve athletes with a best throw of 10.28 metres.

Athlete	Events	Result	Rank
Christian Gobe	Shot Put F55	10.28 m	8

== See also ==
- Cameroon at the 2016 Summer Olympics
