= Alexandre Léauté =

French Paralympic cyclist

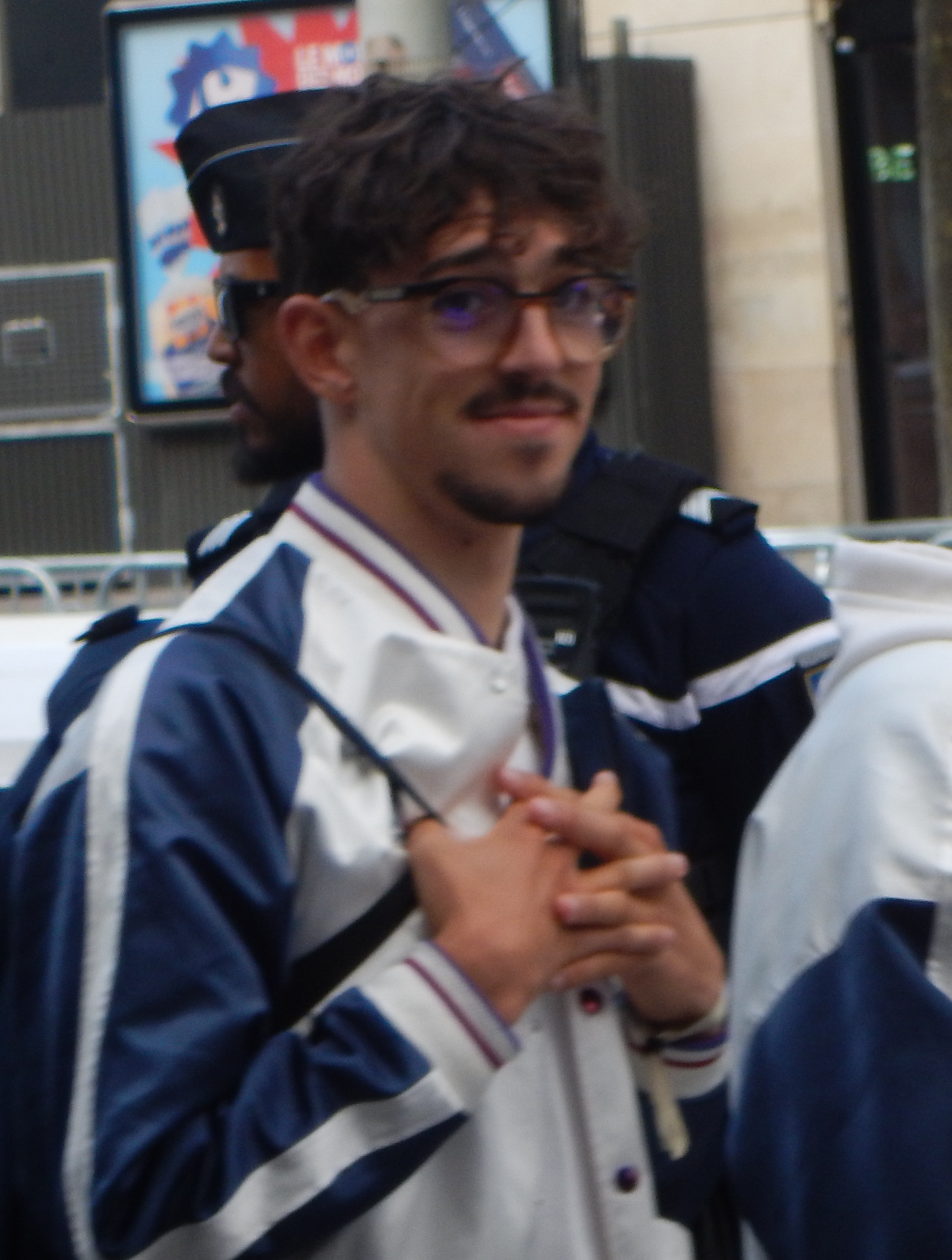
- Léauté in 2024

Personal information
- Nationality: French
- Born: 12 October 2000 (age 26) Saint-Caradec, France

Sport
- Sport: Para-cycling
- Disability class: C2
Medal record
Men's para-cycling
Representing France
Paralympic Games
Gold medal – first place	2020 Tokyo	Individual pursuit C2
Gold medal – first place	2024 Paris	Individual pursuit C2
Gold medal – first place	2024 Paris	Time trial C2
Silver medal – second place	2020 Tokyo	1 km time trial C1–3
Bronze medal – third place	2020 Tokyo	Time trial C2
Bronze medal – third place	2020 Tokyo	Road race C1–3
Bronze medal – third place	2024 Paris	1 km time trial C1–3
Bronze medal – third place	2024 Paris	Road race C1–3
Road World Championships
Gold medal – first place	2019 Emmen	Road race C2
Gold medal – first place	2021 Cascais	Road race C2
Gold medal – first place	2021 Cascais	Time trial C2
Gold medal – first place	2022 Baie-Comeau	Road race C2
Gold medal – first place	2023 Glasgow	Time trial C2
Gold medal – first place	2023 Glasgow	Road race C2
Gold medal – first place	2024 Zurich	Road race C2
Gold medal – first place	2025 Ronse	Time trial C2
Gold medal – first place	2025 Ronse	Road race C2
Gold medal – first place	2026 Huntsville	Road race C2
Gold medal – first place	2026 Huntsville	Time trial C2
Silver medal – second place	2022 Baie-Comeau	Time trial C2
Silver medal – second place	2024 Zurich	Time trial C2
Track World Championships
Gold medal – first place	2020 Milton	1 km time trial C2
Gold medal – first place	2020 Milton	Omnium C2
Gold medal – first place	2022 Saint-Quentin-en-Yvelines	Individual pursuit C2
Gold medal – first place	2022 Saint-Quentin-en-Yvelines	1 km time trial C2
Gold medal – first place	2022 Saint-Quentin-en-Yvelines	Scratch C2
Gold medal – first place	2022 Saint-Quentin-en-Yvelines	Omnium C2
Gold medal – first place	2023 Glasgow	Individual pursuit C2
Gold medal – first place	2023 Glasgow	1 km time trial C2
Gold medal – first place	2023 Glasgow	Omnium C2
Gold medal – first place	2024 Rio de Janeiro	Individual pursuit C2
Gold medal – first place	2024 Rio de Janeiro	1 km time trial C2
Gold medal – first place	2024 Rio de Janeiro	Scratch C2
Gold medal – first place	2024 Rio de Janeiro	Omnium C2
Gold medal – first place	2025 Rio de Janeiro	Scratch C2
Gold medal – first place	2025 Rio de Janeiro	1 km time trial C2
Gold medal – first place	2025 Rio de Janeiro	Elimination C2
Gold medal – first place	2026 Apeldoorn	Scratch C2
Gold medal – first place	2026 Apeldoorn	Elimination C2
Silver medal – second place	2020 Milton	Individual pursuit C2
Silver medal – second place	2022 Saint-Quentin-en-Yvelines	Mixed team sprint C1–5
Silver medal – second place	2026 Apeldoorn	1 km time trial C2
Bronze medal – third place	2020 Milton	Scratch C2
Bronze medal – third place	2023 Glasgow	Scratch C2
Bronze medal – third place	2025 Rio de Janeiro	Sprint C2
European Championships
Gold medal – first place	2023 Rotterdam	Time trial C2
Gold medal – first place	2023 Rotterdam	Road race C2

Alexandre Léauté (born 12 October 2000) is a French Paralympic cyclist.

== Career ==
He competed at the 2020 Summer Paralympics and won a gold a medal in the individual pursuit C2, silver medals in the time trial C1–3 and road time trial C2 and a bronze medal in the road race C1–3. In qualifying he broke the world record and did so again in the final.
