= Cameroon at the 2012 Summer Paralympics =

- IPC code: CMR
- NPC: Cameroonian Paralympic Committee

in London
- Competitors: 1 in 1 sport
- Flag bearer: Conrat Atangana
- Medals: Gold 0 Silver 0 Bronze 0 Total 0

Summer Paralympics appearances (overview)
- 2012; 2016; 2020; 2024

Cameroon made its Paralympic Games debut at the 2012 Summer Paralympics in London, United Kingdom, from August 29 to September 9.

One Cameroonian athlete qualified for the Games: Conrat Atangana, who competed in powerlifting. Other athletes suffered a setback when they were unable to travel to qualifying events in Tunisia, due to a lack of funds.

== Disability classifications ==
Every participant at the Paralympics has their disability grouped into one of five disability categories; amputation (the condition may be congenital or sustained through injury or illness); cerebral palsy; wheelchair athletes (there is often overlap between this and other categories); visual impairment, including blindness; and Les autres, any physical disability that does not fall strictly under one of the other categories, for example dwarfism or multiple sclerosis. Each Paralympic sport then has its own classifications, dependent upon the specific physical demands of competition. Events are given a code, made of numbers and letters, describing the type of event and classification of the athletes competing. Some sports, such as athletics, divide athletes by both the category and severity of their disabilities, other sports, for example swimming, group competitors from different categories together, the only separation being based on the severity of the disability.

== Powerlifting ==
Athlete	Event	Result	Rank
Conrat Atangana	Men's -56kg	155	9

== See also ==
- Cameroon at the Paralympics
- Cameroon at the 2012 Summer Olympics
