= Ewoud Vromant =

Belgian Paralympic cyclist

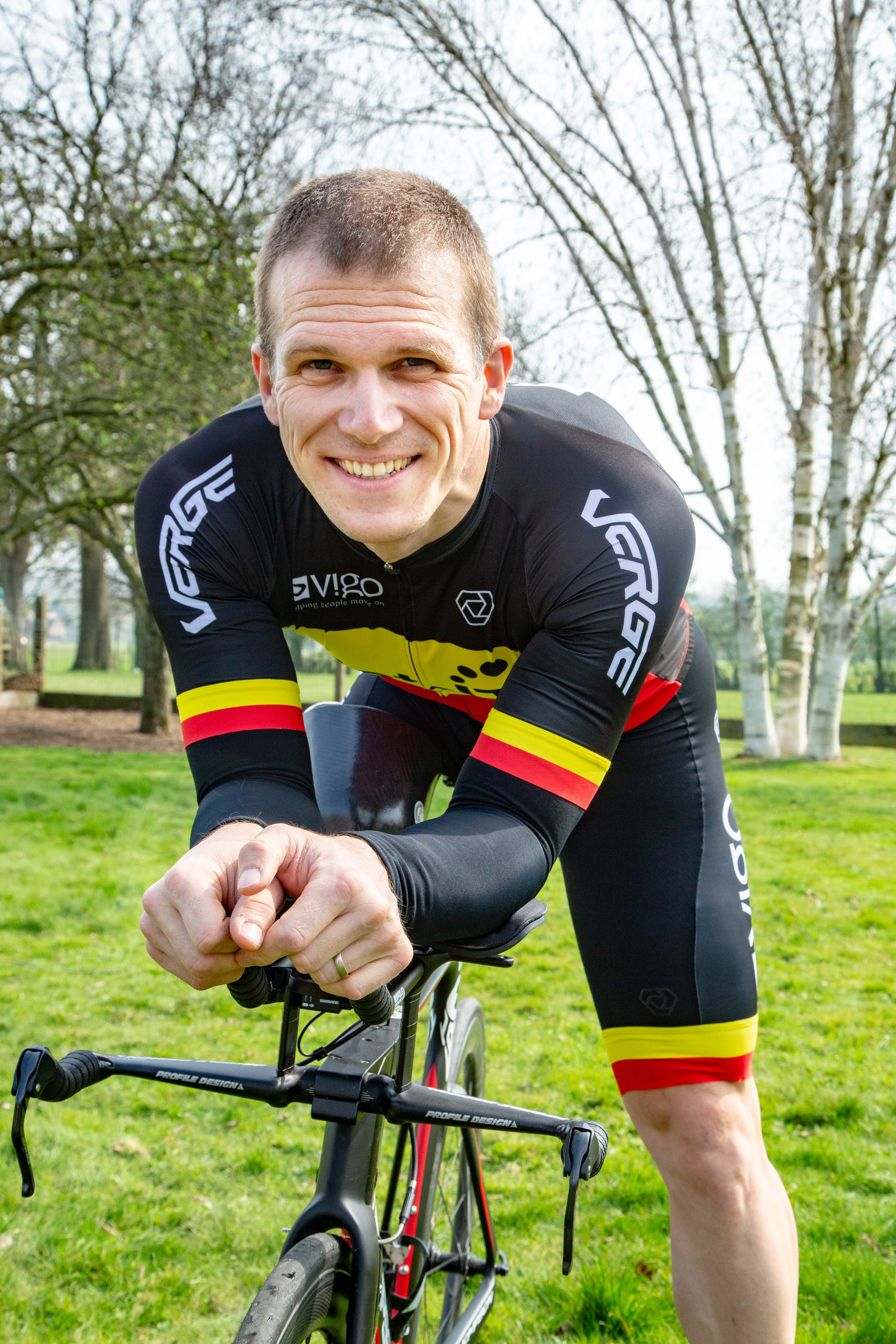

Personal information
- Born: 15 July 1984 (age 42)

Sport
- Sport: Para-cycling
- Disability class: C2
Medal record
Men's para-cycling
Representing Belgium
Paralympic Games
Silver medal – second place	2024 Paris	Road time trial C2
Silver medal – second place	2020 Tokyo	Road time trial C2
Silver medal – second place	2024 Paris	Individual pursuit C2
Road World Championships
Gold medal – first place	2022 Baie-Comeau	Time trial C2
Gold medal – first place	2024 Zurich	Time trial C2
Silver medal – second place	2019 Emmen	Time trial C2
Bronze medal – third place	2021 Cascais	Road race C2
Bronze medal – third place	2019 Emmen	Road race C2
Bronze medal – third place	2022 Baie-Comeau	Road race C2
Bronze medal – third place	2023 Glasgow	Time trial C2
Bronze medal – third place	2023 Glasgow	Road race C2
Bronze medal – third place	2024 Zurich	Road race C2
Bronze medal – third place	2025 Ronse	Time trial C2
Bronze medal – third place	2026 Huntsville	Time trial C2
Track World Championships
Gold medal – first place	2020 Milton	Individual pursuit C2
Silver medal – second place	2024 Rio de Janeiro	Individual pursuit C2
Silver medal – second place	2026 Apeldoorn	Scratch race C2

Ewoud Vromant (born 15 July 1984) is a Belgian road and track cyclist who is active in para-cycling.

== Career ==
At the end of 2012, Vromant was diagnosed with cancer in his right leg. It was amputated in 2013.

In 2015, Vromant won the 100 and 200 meters at the Belgian Athletics Championships. In 2016, he won the relay at the Belgian Athletics Championship, took silver in the 50-meter freestyle and bronze in the 100-meter freestyle at the Belgian Swimming Championship and bronze in the road race at the Belgian Cycling Championship.

Since 2017, he has focused on cycling. In 2020, Vromant won the pursuit at the World Track Cycling Para-Cycling Championships in Milton, Ontario, Canada. In 2021, he won bronze at the UCI Para-cycling Road World Championships and finished fourth in the time trial at the World G Cycling Championships in Cascais, Portugal. In July 2022, Vromant set a new UCI hour record for C2 para-cycling, with a distance of 46.521 kilometers.
