= Peru at the 2004 Summer Paralympics =

- IPC code: PER
- NPC: National Paralympic Committee Peru

in Athens
- Competitors: 5 in 2 sports
- Flag bearer: Jaime Eulert
- Medals Ranked 71st: Gold 0 Silver 0 Bronze 2 Total 2

Summer Paralympics appearances (overview)
- 1972; 1976; 1980–1992; 1996; 2000; 2004; 2008; 2012; 2016; 2020; 2024

Peru competed at the 2004 Summer Paralympics in Athens, Greece. The team included 5 athletes, 4 men and 1 women. Competitors from Peru won two bronze medals to finish 71st in the medal table.

== Medalists ==
Medal	Name	Sport	Event
Bronze	Jaime Eulert	Swimming	Men's 50m freestyle S3
Bronze	Jaime Eulert	Swimming	Men's 50m backstroke S3

== Sports ==
=== Athletics ===
==== Men's field ====
Athlete	Class	Event	Final		
Athlete	Class	Event	Result	Points	Rank
Pompilio Falconi	F42	Javelin	43.03	-	7

=== Equestrian ===
Athlete	Event	Total	
Athlete	Event	Score	Rank
Rosa Loewenthal	Mixed individual championship test grade I	66.842	8
Rosa Loewenthal	Mixed individual freestyle test grade I	68.875	8

=== Powerlifting ===
Athlete	Event	Result	Rank
Juan Chavez	Men's 75kg	NMR	

=== Swimming ===
Athlete	Class	Event	Heats		Final	
Athlete	Class	Event	Result	Rank	Result	Rank
Jaime Eulert	S3	50m freestyle	49.98	3 Q	50.22	3rd place, bronze medalist(s)
Jaime Eulert	S3	100m freestyle	DSQ		did not advance	
Jaime Eulert	S3	50m backstroke	55.99	2 Q	55.76	3rd place, bronze medalist(s)
Jose Gonzales-Mugaburu	S7	100m backstroke	1:29.50	10	did not advance	

== See also ==
- Peru at the Paralympics
- Peru at the 2004 Summer Olympics
