= Albert Bakaev =

Russian Paralympic swimmer

Medal record

Swimming

Representing Unified Team

Paralympic Games
Bronze medal – third place	1992 Barcelona	50 metre backstroke - S4

Representing Russia

Paralympic Games
Gold medal – first place	1996 Atlanta	50 metre backstroke - S3
Silver medal – second place	1996 Atlanta	50 metre freestyle - S3
Silver medal – second place	2000 Sydney	100 metre freestyle - S3
Silver medal – second place	2004 Athens	50 metre backstroke - S3
Bronze medal – third place	2000 Sydney	50 metre backstroke - S3
Bronze medal – third place	2000 Sydney	50 metre freestyle - S3

Albert Bakaev (9 January 1964 – 5 July 2009) was a paralympic swimmer from Russia competing mainly in category S3 events.

== Career ==
Albert has competed at the Paralympics on five occasions, firstly in 1992 competing for the unified team then in 1996, 2000, 2004 and 2008 competing for the Russian team. In 1992 he won a bronze in the 50m backstroke behind two Frenchmen, he also finished sixth in the 100m freestyle, eighth in the 50m freestyle final and last in his heat of the 50m breaststroke. At the 1996 games he swam a world record in the heats of the 50m backstroke and despite swimming marginally slower in the final won the gold medal he also won a silver in the 50m freestyle behind Peruvian Jaime Eulert who set a world record he also finished fifth in the 100m freestyle. In 2000 he won a silver in the 100m freestyle, bronze in the 50m freestyle and bronze in the 50m backstroke. Athens in 2004 would prove less profitable in terms of medals but he did win a silver in the 50m backstroke, finished fourth in the 50m freestyle and sixth in the 100m freestyle. At his fifth games in Beijing Albert finished eighth in the 100m freestyle, sixth in the 50m backstroke, eighth in the 50m freestyle and was part of the Russian relay team that was disqualified in the heats of the 4x50m medley.
