= Mimozette Nghamsi Fotie =

Cameroonian para-powerlifter

Personal information
- Born: December 20, 1977 (age 48)
- Weight: 44.49 kg (98 lb)

Sport
- Country: Cameroon
- Sport: Para-powerlifting
- Event: Women's −45 kg

Achievements and titles
- Paralympic finals: 2020 Tokyo

Mimozette Nghamsi Fotie is a Cameroonian para-powerlifting athlete who has competed internationally in the women's flyweight categories. She represented Cameroon at the 2014 Commonwealth Games and the 2020 Summer Paralympics.

== Career ==
On August 2, 2014, Nghamsi Fotie competed in the women's lightweight (-61 kg) division at the 2014 Commonwealth Games in Glasgow, Scotland. She completed a 65.0 kg bench press on her first attempt, ultimately placing 5th overall.

In December 2018, she stepped up to the -50 kg weight class while competing for the French club ASMIC Gonesse (Sports Association for the Mutilated and Disabled of the City and Region Gonesse). During the Coupe de France des Clubs, she successfully achieved a bench press of 87 kg.

Nghamsi Fotie secured her highest global ranking at the 2019 IPC Para Powerlifting World Championships, where she placed 7th overall in the -45 kg category. Due to these achievements, she was regarded as one of the top para-powerlifters on the African continent.

She qualified to represent Cameroon at the delayed 2020 Summer Paralympics in Tokyo, Japan, held in 2021. She was the first athlete from the Cameroonian delegation to compete at the Tokyo games, though she was ultimately eliminated during the early rounds of the -45 kg competition.
