= Ioannis Kostakis =

Greek Paralympic swimmer (born 1971)

Personal information
- Born: 16 December 1971 (age 54)
Medal record
Men's para swimming
Representing Greece
Paralympic Games
Bronze medal – third place	2004 Athens	100 m freestyle S3
World Championships
Bronze medal – third place	2002 Mar del Plata	100 m freestyle S3

Ioannis Kostakis (born 16 December 1971) is a Greek swimmer.

He has represented Greece at the Paralympic Games on seven occasions, in 2000, 2004, 2008, 2012, 2016, 2020 and 2024 . He won the bronze medal at the 2004 Games in Athens.
