= Conrat Atangana =

Cameroonian Paralympic weightlifter

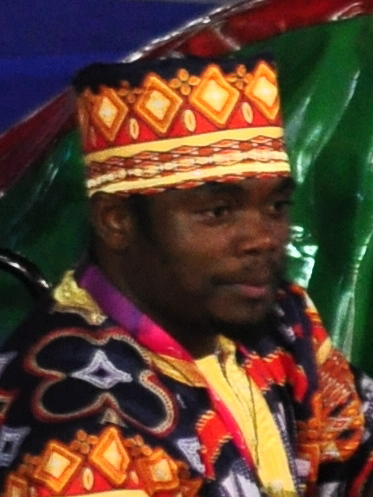

Personal information
- Full name: Conrat Frederic Atangana
- Born: 1987 (age 38–39) Yaounde, Cameroon
- Weight: 56.16 kg (124 lb) (2015)

Sport
- Country: Cameroon
- Sport: Powerlifting, Athletics, Wheelchair basketball
- Disability: Physical disability
- Disability class: T53, 3 point player
- Event(s): Men's -53kg, Men's -56kg

Achievements and titles
- Paralympic finals: 2012
Medal record
Powerlifting (-53kg)
Representing Cameroon
JAPHAF
Gold medal – first place	2006	-53kg
Gold medal – first place	2007 Nouakchott	-53kg
Gold medal – first place	2008 Yaounde	-52kg
Gold medal – first place	2009 Niamey	-53kg
Gold medal – first place	2011	-53kg
Wheelchair basketball
Representing Cameroon
JAPHAF
Gold medal – first place	2006	Men's Team
Gold medal – first place	2007 Nouakchott	Men's Team
Gold medal – first place	2008 Yaounde	Men's Team
Track and field
Representing Cameroon
JAPHAF
Silver medal – second place	2006	Shot Put
Czech Open
Bronze medal – third place	2013	Javelin

Conrat Frederic Atangana (born 1987 in Yaounde) is a Paralympian from Cameroon who represented his country at the 2012 Summer Paralympics in powerlifting's men's -56 kg event.

Atangana has a disability as a result of contracting polio when he was very young. After representing Cameroon internationally, Atangana and two other Cameroonian para-sportspeople went to France where they applied for refugee status. He resides in Nantes, France.

The Cameroon international first got involved with para-sports through sitting volleyball. He moved to Cameroon's capital to train more seriously, switching to powerlifting, wheelchair basketball and athletics. He went on to represent Cameroon in all three sports, including at the 2012 Summer Paralympics where he was his country's first Paralympian ever at the 2012 Games. He has won several medals at the African Francophone Games for the Handicapped.

== Personal ==
Born in 1987 in Yaounde, Atangana contracted polio when he was very young. The illness left him with physical disability that affected his left leg, and he gets around on crutches. Eventually, Atangana and fellow Cameroonian para-sportspeople Jean Solange Avah Mbida and Herve Ndi decided the problems in Cameroon were too bad, and went to Pas-de-Calais, France as refugees. The group chose the city because Cameroonian football Marc-Vivien Foé was there to aid in their transition. He has two daughters, and lives in Nantes, France.

== Sports ==
Atangana first got involved with sports in 2004, when he started playing sitting volleyball. People suggested he move to Cameroon's capital to train more seriously in sitting volleyball. Doing this, he then went on to compete at the 2006 African Francophone Games for the Handicapped, representing Cameroon as a member of the national wheelchair basketball team and competing in powerlifting, picking up gold medals in both sports. After representing Cameroon internationally in powerlifting, athletics and wheelchair basketball, he went to France as a refugee where he continued to be involved in all three sports.

=== Powerlifting ===
Atangana competed at the 2006 African Francophone Games for the Handicapped (French: Jeux de l'Avenir des personnes handicapées d'Afrique francophone (JAPHAF)), where he won a gold medal in powerlifting. He was back again for the 2007 edition in Nouakchott, Mauritania, the 2009 edition in Niamey, Niger and the 2011 edition in Yaoundé where he won gold each time. He participated in the 2008 African Francophone Games for the Handicapped, winning gold in the men's -52 kg event with a lift of 140 kg. Five Cameroonian powerlifters competed in the 2011 IPC Fazza Powerlifting-Dubai, with Atangana ultimately earning a qualifying berth for London following the competition. At a 2012 IPC Powerlifting event in Dubai, he managed a lift of 160 kg.

Atangana was still involved with the sport following the 2012 Games, competing in the first ranking competition for the 2016 Summer Paralympics, an event in September 2015 in Brazzaville, Congo. He finished third in the -59 kg class with a best lift of 160 kg. He finished 2015 being ranked nineteenth in the world in the men's -59 kg class with a season best lift of 160 kg. He was unranked in 2009, 2010, 2011, 2013 and 2014.

==== Paralympics ====
Atangana was the country's sole representative at the 2012 Games where the country made its Paralympic debut. Competing in powerlifting's men's -56 kg event in London, Atangana finished ninth in an eleven deep field, with a best lift of 155 kg. Atangana was the country's flag bearer for the opening ceremonies of the 2012 Games. Atangana said he planned to return home after the Games, with no intention of fleeing like his 2012 Olympic colleagues did.

Prior to the start of the London Games, the Cameroon delegation was at the University of Bath from August 15 to August 19. There, Atangana and seven other Cameroon para-powerlifters worked with international trainers to recalibrate their form for competition as Cameroon lacked the technical knowledge to provide adequate coaching in country. Funding problems for the Cameroon delegation were the major reason that Atangana was the country's sole representative in London. Getting access to funds to compete in London as easier as he was based in Nantes, France.

=== Athletics ===
Atangana is a T53/F53 classified athlete. Participating at the 2007 Algerian Games (French: Jeux d'Alger), he had a fourth-place finish in the shot put. Competing at the home hosted 2008 African Francophone Games for the Handicapped, he won a silver medal in the shot put. Cameroon sent a delegation to the 2013 Czech Open. Atangana won a bronze medal at the competition in the javelin. Atangana also competed at the 2014 Paris Seine-S Paralympic Athletics Meeting, finishing 6th in the javelin event with a throw of 17.93 meters and sixth in the shot put with a throw of 6.81 meters.

=== Wheelchair basketball ===
A 3.5 point player, Atangana has made multiple appearances for the Cameroon men's national team. He competed at the 2006 African Francophone Games for the Handicapped as a member of the Cameroon national team. His team took home a gold medal. He replicated this accomplishment at the 2007 and 2008 editions. He was part of the Cameroon squad at the 2007 All-Africa Games in Algeria.
