= Samuel Soler Martín =

Spanish swimmer

Samuel Soler Martin
Personal information
- Nationality: Spanish
- Born: May 18, 1979 (age 47) Plasencia, Cáceres

Sport
- Country: Spain
- Sport: Swimming (S3)
Medal record
Swimming
Representing Spain
Paralympic Games
Bronze medal – third place	2000 Sydney	200m freestyle S3

Samuel Soler Martin (born May 18, 1979, in Plasencia, Cáceres) is an S3 swimmer from Spain. He competed at the 2000 Summer Paralympics, winning a bronze medal in the 200 meter freestyle race. He raced at the 2004 Summer Paralympics where he did not medal.
