= Martin Kovář =

Czech para-swimmer and para-cyclist

Personal information
- Born: 20 March 1967 (age 59) Prague, Czechoslovakia

Sport
- Sport: Paralympic swimming
- Disability: Spinal cord injury
- Disability class: S3
- Event(s): Freestyle, backstroke
Medal record
Paralympic swimming
Representing Czech Republic
Paralympic Games
| Gold medal – first place | 2000 Sydney | 50m backstroke S3 |
| Gold medal – first place | 2004 Athens | 50m freestyle S3 |
| Gold medal – first place | 2004 Athens | 100m freestyle S3 |
| Gold medal – first place | 2004 Athens | 200m freestyle S3 |
| Bronze medal – third place | 2000 Sydney | 100m freestyle S3 |
World Championships
| Gold medal – first place | 2002 Mar del Plata | 50m freestyle S3 |
| Gold medal – first place | 2002 Mar del Plata | 100m freestyle S3 |
| Silver medal – second place | 2002 Mar del Plata | 4x50m freestyle relay 20pts |
| Silver medal – second place | 2002 Mar del Plata | 200m freestyle S3 |

Martin Kovář (born 20 March 1967) is a Czech former Paralympic swimmer and cyclist. He is a four-time Paralympic swimming champion and double World swimming champion. Kovář has competed at the 1996, 2000 and 2004 Summer Paralympics in swimming and 2012 Summer Paralympics in cycling.

Kovář was named Czech Paralympian of the Year in 2004 after winning four gold medals at the 2004 Summer Paralympics.
