= Carlo Piccoli =

Italian Paralympic swimmer

Personal information
- Born: 26 September 1970 (age 55) Bussolengo, Italy

Sport
- Country: Italy
- Sport: Para Swimming
Medal record
Representing Italy
Paralympic swimming
Paralympic Games
Bronze medal – third place	2004 Athens	200m freestyle S3
World Championships
Bronze medal – third place	2002 Mar del Plata	200m freestyle S3

Carlo Piccoli (born 26 September 1970) is a former Italian paralympic swimmer who won a bronze medal at the 2004 Summer Paralympics.
