= Genezi Andrade =

Brazilian Paralympic swimmer

Personal information
- Full name: Genezi Alves de Andrade
- Born: 31 August 1972 (age 53) Natal, Brazil

Sport
- Country: Brazil
- Sport: Paralympic swimming
- Disability: Polio
- Disability class: S3
Medal record
Paralympic swimming
Representing Brazil
Paralympic Games
| Silver medal – second place | 1996 Atlanta | 150m individual medley SM3 |
| Bronze medal – third place | 1992 Barcelona | 50m backstroke S3 |
| Bronze medal – third place | 1996 Atlanta | 100m freestyle S3 |
| Bronze medal – third place | 1996 Atlanta | 200m freestyle S3 |
| Bronze medal – third place | 2000 Sydney | 150m individual medley SM3 |
World Championships
| Gold medal – first place | 1998 Christchurch | 50m breaststroke SB2 |
| Silver medal – second place | 1998 Christchurch | 50m backstroke S3 |
| Bronze medal – third place | 1998 Christchurch | 100m freestyle S3 |
| Bronze medal – third place | 1998 Christchurch | 200m freestyle S3 |
| Bronze medal – third place | 2002 Mar del Plata | 150m individual medley SM3 |
| Bronze medal – third place | 2006 Durban | 200m freestyle S3 |
| Bronze medal – third place | 2006 Durban | 50m backstroke S3 |
Parapan American Games
| Gold medal – first place | 2003 Mar del Plata | 200m freestyle S3 |
| Gold medal – first place | 2011 Guadalajara | 50m freestyle S3 |
| Silver medal – second place | 2003 Mar del Plata | 50m freestyle S3 |
| Silver medal – second place | 2003 Mar del Plata | 100m freestyle S3 |
| Silver medal – second place | 2003 Mar del Plata | 50m backstroke S3 |
| Bronze medal – third place | 2003 Mar del Plata | 50m breaststroke SB2 |
| Bronze medal – third place | 2003 Mar del Plata | 150m individual medley SM3 |
| Bronze medal – third place | 2011 Guadalajara | 50m breaststroke SB2 |
| Bronze medal – third place | 2011 Guadalajara | 150m individual medley SM3 |

Genezi Alves de Andrade (born 31 August 1972) is a retired Brazilian Paralympic swimmer who competed at international elite competitions. He is a five-time Paralympic medalist, eight-time World medalist and double Parapan American Games champion.
