= Jaime Eulert =

Peruvian Paralympic swimmer

Personal information
- Full name: Jaime Eulert Pinto
- Born: 1 January 1952 (age 74) La Paz, Bolivia

Sport
- Country: Peru
- Sport: Paralympic swimming
- Disability class: S3
Medal record
Paralympic swimming
Representing Peru
Paralympic Games
Gold medal – first place	1996 Atlanta	Men's 50m freestyle S3
Gold medal – first place	2000 Sydney	Men's 50m freestyle S3
Silver medal – second place	2000 Sydney	Men's 50m backstroke S3
Bronze medal – third place	2004 Athens	Men's 50m freestyle S3
Bronze medal – third place	2004 Athens	Men's 50m backstroke S3
World Championships
Silver medal – second place	2002 Mar del Plata	Men's 50m freestyle S3
Silver medal – second place	2002 Mar del Plata	Men's 50m backstroke S3
Bronze medal – third place	1998 Christchurch	Men's 50m backstroke S3
Bronze medal – third place	2006 Durban	Men's 50m freestyle S3
Parapan American Games
Gold medal – first place	1999 Mexico City	Men's 50m freestyle S3
Gold medal – first place	1999 Mexico City	Men's 50m backstroke S3
Gold medal – first place	2003 Mar del Plata	Men's 50m freestyle S3
Gold medal – first place	2003 Mar del Plata	Men's 50m backstroke S3
Gold medal – first place	2007 Rio de Janeiro	Men's 50m freestyle S3
Gold medal – first place	2007 Rio de Janeiro	Men's 100m freestyle S3
Silver medal – second place	1999 Mexico City	Men's 100m freestyle S3

Jaime "Jimmy" Eulert Pinto (born 1 January 1952) is a retired Peruvian Paralympic swimmer who competed in international level events. He is Peru's most successful Paralympian.

Eulert became quadriplegic after he was struck by a car while riding a motorbike with a friend in the Chorrillos District.
