= India at the 1984 Summer Paralympics =

- IPC code: IND
- NPC: Paralympic Committee of India
- Website: Paralympic India

in New York/Stoke Mandeville June 19, 1984 – August 1, 1984
- Competitors: 5 in 2 sports
- Medals Ranked 37th: Gold 0 Silver 2 Bronze 2 Total 4

Summer Paralympics appearances (overview)
- 1968; 1972; 1976–1980; 1984; 1988; 1992; 1996; 2000; 2004; 2008; 2012; 2016; 2020; 2024

India competed at the 1984 Summer Paralympics held across New York and Stoke Mandeville from 19 June to 1 August 1984. The nation made its official debut at the 1968 Summer Paralympics but did not appear in the last two Games. This was India's third appearance at the Summer Games for the disabled. India sent a contingent consisting of five athletes for the Games and won four medals including two silver and bronze medals each.

== Background ==
The ninth International Stoke Mandville Games was later designated as the first Paralympics in 1960 and the International Stoke Mandeville Games Federation organized the Paralympic Games till 1984. India made its Paralympics debut in 1968. India's first and only medal till the Games came in the 1972 Games when Murlikant Petkar won the gold medal in the men's 50 meter freestyle event. India missed the subsequent two Summer Paralympic Games and returned for the 1984 edition.

== Medalists ==
In the Games, Joginder Singh Bedi became the first Indian multi-medalist after he won a silver and two bronze medals in the athletics events. Bhimrao Kesarkar also won a silver medal in the javelin throw event to help record India's best finish till then with four medals.

Medal	Name	Sport	Event
(silver) Silver	Bhimrao Kesarkar	Athletics	Men's javelin L6
(silver) Silver	Joginder Singh Bedi	Athletics	Men's shot put L6
(bronze) Bronze	Joginder Singh Bedi	Athletics	Men's javelin L6
(bronze) Bronze	Joginder Singh Bedi	Athletics	Men's discus throw L6

=== Summary ===
Medals by sport
Sport	Gold	Silver	Bronze	Total
Athletics	0	2	2	4
Total	0	2	2	4

Medals by gender
Gender	Gold	Silver	Bronze	Total
Male	0	2	2	4
Female	0	0	0	0
Total	0	2	2	4

Multiple medalists
Name	Sport	Gold	Silver	Bronze	Total
Joginder Singh Bedi	Athletics	0	1	2	3

== Competitors ==
The Indian contingent for the Games consisted of five athletes who competed across two sports.

Sport	Men	Women	Total
Athletics	4	0	4
Swimming	2	0	2
Total	5 (Note: Bhimrao Kesarkar competed in both athletics and swimming.)	0	5

== Athletics ==
Track

Athlete	Event	Heat		Final	
Athlete	Event	Result	Rank	Result	Rank
Abdul Jabbar	Men's 100 m A6	16.34	8	Did not advance	
Digambar Mehendale	Men's 100 m A1-3	28.70	7	Did not advance	
Digambar Mehendale	Men's 400 m A1-3	—N/a		2:08.51	7

Field

Athlete	Event	Result	Rank
Abdul Jabbar	Men's high jump A6	NM	
Abdul Jabbar	Men's long jump A6	4.35	13
Abdul Jabbar	Men's triple jump A6	9.26	10
Bhimrao Kesarkar	Men's javelin L6	34.55	2nd place, silver medalist(s)
Digambar Mehendale	Men's discus throw A3	16.90	10
Digambar Mehendale	Men's javelin A3	21.82	8
Digambar Mehendale	Men's shot put A3	6.34	11
Joginder Singh Bedi	Men's discus throw L6	28.16	3rd place, bronze medalist(s)
Joginder Singh Bedi	Men's javelin L6	34.18	3rd place, bronze medalist(s)
Joginder Singh Bedi	Men's shot put L6	10.08	2nd place, silver medalist(s)

== Swimming ==
Athlete	Event	Heat		Final	
Athlete	Event	Result	Rank	Result	Rank
Bhagwan Patil	Men's 100 m freestyle A9	—N/a		2:08.84	7
Bhagwan Patil	Men's 50 m backstroke A9	—N/a		1:13.37	5
Bhagwan Patil	Men's 50 m breaststroke A9	—N/a		DQ	
Bhimrao Kesarkar	Men's 100 m freestyle L6	2:02.22	5	Did not advance	

== See also ==
- India at the Paralympics
- India at the 1984 Summer Olympics
