= India at the 2004 Summer Paralympics =

- IPC code: IND
- NPC: Paralympic Committee of India
- Website: Paralympic India

in Athens September 17, 2004 – September 28, 2004
- Competitors: 12 in 2 sports
- Medals Ranked 53rd: Gold 1 Silver 0 Bronze 1 Total 2

Summer Paralympics appearances (overview)
- 1968; 1972; 1976–1980; 1984; 1988; 1992; 1996; 2000; 2004; 2008; 2012; 2016; 2020; 2024

India competed at the 2004 Summer Paralympics in Athens from 17 to 28 September 2004. The nation made its official debut at the 1968 Summer Paralympics and has appeared in every edition of the Summer Paralympics since 1984. This was India's eighth appearance at the Summer Paralympics.

India sent a contingent consisting of 12 athletes competing across two sports in the Paralympic Games. India not two medals in the Games including one gold and bronze medal each.

== Background ==
The Paralympic Committee of India was formed in 1994, five years after the International Paralympic Committee was established in 1989. The nation made its Paralympics debut in 1968 and have appeared in every edition of the Summer Paralympic Games since 1984. This edition of the Games marked the nation's eighth appearance at the Summer Paralympics.

India had won five medals across the previous Paralympic Games including one gold, two silver and bronze medals each. The Indian contingent for the 2004 Games consisted of 12 people.

== Medalists ==
Indian competitors won two medals at the Games, one gold and one bronze, to finish joint 53rd in the medal table.

Medal	Name	Sport	Event
(gold) Gold	Devendra Jhajharia	Athletics	Men's javelin throw F44/46
(bronze) Bronze	Rajinder Singh Rahelu	Powerlifting	Men's 56kg

=== Summary ===
Medals by sport
Sport	Gold	Silver	Bronze	Total
Athletics	1	0	0	1
Powerlifting	0	0	1	1
Total	1	0	1	2

Medals by gender
Gender	Gold	Silver	Bronze	Total
Male	1	0	1	2
Female	0	0	0	0
Total	1	0	1	2

== Competitors ==
The Indian contingent for the 2004 Games consisted of twelve athletes - eleven men and one woman, who competed across two sports.

Sport	Men	Women	Total
Athletics	7	1	8
Powerlifting	2	0	2
Total	11	1	12

== Athletics ==
Athlete	Event	Result	Points	Rank
Nir Bahadur Gurung	Men's discus throw F53	18.72	-	6
Nir Bahadur Gurung	Men's shot put F53	6.18	-	9
V Gopalappa	Men's discus throw F55	25.20	-	11
V Gopalappa	Men's javelin throw F55-56	19.94	682	18
Devendra Jhajharia	Men's javelin throw F44/46	62.15 WR	1117	1st place, gold medalist(s)
Devendra Jhajharia	Men's triple jump F46	12.03	-	9
Syamala Raju	Men's discus throw F54	22.87	-	9
Rajarathinam Subbaiah	Men's long jump F46	5.40	-	11
Rajarathinam Subbaiah	Men's triple jump F46	Did not start		
Surjeet Singh	Men's shot put F42	10.70	-	9
Yadvendra Vashishta	Men's discus throw F44/46	33.35	667	11
Yadvendra Vashishta	Men's shot put F44/46	10.71	737	14
Malathi Krishna	Women's discus throw F54/55	14.67	573	13
Malathi Krishna	Women's shot put F54/55	5.24	861	8

Legend: WR = World Record

== Powerlifting ==
Athlete	Event	Result	Rank
Farman Basha	Men's 52 kg	127.5	10
Rajinder Singh Rahelu	Men's 56 kg	157.5	3rd place, bronze medalist(s)

== See also ==
- India at the Paralympics
- India at the 2004 Summer Olympics
