= India at the 2012 Summer Paralympics =

- IPC code: IND
- NPC: Paralympic Committee of India
- Website: www.paralympicindia.org.in

in London
- Competitors: 10 in 4 sports
- Flag bearer: Jagseer Singh
- Medals Ranked 67th: Gold 0 Silver 1 Bronze 0 Total 1

Summer Paralympics appearances (overview)
- 1968; 1972; 1976–1980; 1984; 1988; 1992; 1996; 2000; 2004; 2008; 2012; 2016; 2020; 2024

India competed in the 2012 Summer Paralympics in London from 29 August to 9 September 2012. The nation made its official debut at the 1968 Summer Paralympics and has appeared in every edition of the Summer Paralympics since 1984. This was India's 10th appearance at the Summer Paralympics. The Indian contingent consisted of ten athletes competing across four sports in the Paralympic Games. India won one silver medal in the competition.

== Background ==
The Paralympic Committee of India (PCI) was formed in 1994, five years after the International Paralympic Committee (IPC) was established in 1989. The ninth International Stoke Mandville Games was later designated as the first Paralympics in 1960. The International Stoke Mandeville Games Federation organized the Paralympic Games till 1984. The 1988 Seoul Paralympics was the first to use the Paralympics name and the event has been held in the same host city as the corresponding Summer Olympic Games since then.

The nation made its Paralympics debut in 1968 and have appeared in every edition of the Summer Paralympic Games since 1984. This edition of the Games marked the nation's tenth appearance at the Summer Paralympics. Jagseer Singh was the flag bearer during the opening ceremony.

The Indian contingent consisted of ten athletes, assisted by six coaches and five escorts. During the course of the Games, the support staff of the Indian team were denied accommodation in the Games Village as their permits were illegally used by the officials of the Paralympic Committee of India and their family members.

== Medalists ==
Girisha Nagarajegowda won the only medal, a silver medal in the Men's high jump F42 event.

Medal	Name	Sport	Event	Date
Silver	Girisha Nagarajegowda	Athletics	Men's high jump F42	3 September

== Competitors ==
The Indian contingent consisted of ten athletes competing across four sports in the Paralympic Games.

Sport	Men	Women	Events
Athletics	5	0	5
Powerlifting	3	0	3
Shooting	1	0	3
Swimming	1	0	4

== Athletics ==
Athlete	Event	Distance	Points	Rank
Girisha Nagarajegowda	Men's high jump F42	1.74	—N/a	2nd place, silver medalist(s)
Jaideep Deswal	Men's discus throw F42	39.77	—N/a	7
Amit Kumar	Men's discus throw F51-53	9.89	674	8
Narender Ranbir	Men's javelin throw F44	49.50	—N/a	6
Jagseer Singh	Men's long jump F46	6.42	—N/a	6

== Powerlifting ==
Athlete	Event	Result	Rank
Farman Basha	Men's -48 kg	150.0	5
Rajinder Singh Rahelu	Men's -67.5 kg	NMR	
Sachin Chaudhary	Men's -82.5 kg	187.0	9

== Shooting ==
Athlete	Event	Qualification		Final	
Athlete	Event	Score	Rank	Score	Rank
Naresh Sharma	Men's 10 m air rifle standing SH1	571	24	Did not advance	
Naresh Sharma	Mixed 50 m rifle prone SH1	575	36	Did not advance	
Naresh Sharma	Men's 50 m rifle 3 Positions SH1	1109	19	Did not advance	

== Swimming ==
Sharath Gayakwad was the sole Indian representative in the swimming event of the Games. He earned a berth in men's 100m breaststroke SB8 event after winning a bronze medal in the Asian Para Games held in Guangzhou, China. Gayakwad trained for the Games under coach Mel Tantrum in Perth, Australia.

Athletes	Event	Heat		Final	
Athletes	Event	Time	Rank	Time	Rank
Sharath Gayakwad	Men's 100m butterfly S8	1:07.12	9	Did not advance	
Sharath Gayakwad	Men's 100 m breaststroke SB8	1:18.20	12	Did not advance	
Sharath Gayakwad	Men's 50 m freestyle S8	28.98	12	Did not advance	
Sharath Gayakwad	Men's 200 m individual medley SM8	2:38.17	14	Did not advance	

== See also ==
- India at the Paralympics
- India at the 2012 Summer Olympics
