= India at the 2016 Summer Paralympics =

- IPC code: IND
- NPC: Paralympic Committee of India
- Website: www.paralympicindia.org.in

in Rio de Janeiro
- Competitors: 19 in 5 sports
- Flag bearers: Devendra Jhajharia (opening); Mariyappan Thangavelu (closing)
- Medals Ranked 43rd: Gold 2 Silver 1 Bronze 1 Total 4

Summer Paralympics appearances (overview)
- 1968; 1972; 1976–1980; 1984; 1988; 1992; 1996; 2000; 2004; 2008; 2012; 2016; 2020; 2024

India competed at the 2016 Summer Paralympics in Rio de Janeiro, Brazil, from 7 to 18 September 2016. The nation made its official debut at the 1968 Summer Paralympics and has appeared in every edition of the Summer Paralympics since 1984. This is India's 11th appearance at the Summer Paralympics.

India sent its largest ever delegation for the Summer Paralympic Games consisting of 19 athletes competing across five sports. Devendra Jhajharia was the flag bearer during the opening ceremony and Mariyappan Thangavelu carried the Indian flag during the closing ceremony. The Games also marked India's best ever performance at the Paralympics till then with four medals including one gold, one silver and two bronze medals.

== Background ==
The Paralympic Committee of India (PCI) was formed in 1994, five years after the International Paralympic Committee (IPC) was established in 1989. The ninth International Stoke Mandville Games was later designated as the first Paralympics in 1960. The International Stoke Mandeville Games Federation organized the Paralympic Games till 1984. The 1988 Seoul Paralympics was the first to use the Paralympics name and the event has been held in the same host city as the corresponding Summer Olympic Games since then.

The nation made its Paralympics debut in 1968 and have appeared in every edition of the Summer Paralympic Games since 1984. This edition of the Games marked the nation's 11th appearance at the Summer Paralympics. Devendra Jhajharia was the flag bearer during the opening ceremony and Mariyappan Thangavelu carried the Indian flag during the closing ceremony.

== Disability classification ==
Every participant at the Paralympics has their disability grouped into one of five disability categories; amputation, the condition may be congenital or sustained through injury or illness; cerebral palsy; wheelchair athletes, there is often overlap between this and other categories; visual impairment, including blindness; Les autres, any physical disability that does not fall strictly under one of the other categories, for example dwarfism or multiple sclerosis.

Each Paralympic sport then has its own classifications, dependent upon the specific physical demands of competition. Events are given a code, made of numbers and letters, describing the type of event and classification of the athletes competing. Some sports, such as athletics, divide athletes by both the category and severity of their disabilities, other sports, for example swimming, group competitors from different categories together, the only separation being based on the severity of the disability.

== Medallists ==
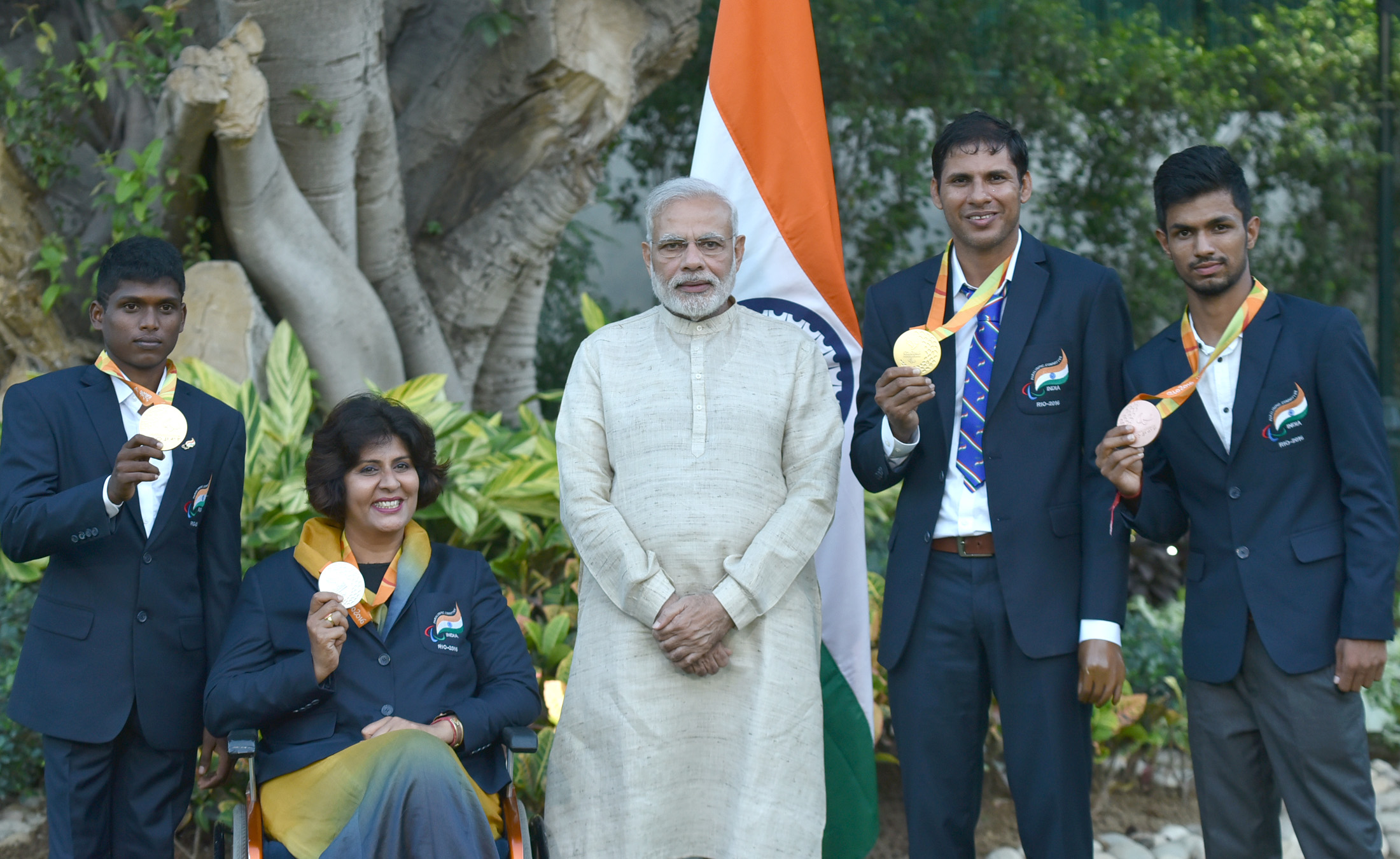
The medal winners with the Indian Prime Minister: (left to right) Mariyappan Thangavelu, Deepa Malik, Narendra Modi, Devendra Jhajharia, Varun Bhati

The Games also marked India's best ever performance at the Paralympics till then with four medals including one gold, one silver and two bronze medals. Mariyappan Thangavelu won the first gold medal in the Men's high jump T42 event. Devendra Jhajharia won the other gold medal in the Men's javelin throw F46 event, breaking the World Record in the process. Deepa Malik and Varun Bhati were the other medalists with a silver and bronze medal respectively.

Medalists
Medal	Name	Sport	Event	Date
Gold	Mariyappan Thangavelu	Athletics	Men's High Jump T42	9 September
Gold	Devendra Jhajharia	Athletics	Men's Javelin Throw F46	14 September
Silver	Deepa Malik	Athletics	Women's Shot Put- F53	12 September
Bronze	Varun Bhati	Athletics	Men's High Jump T42	9 September

Medals by sport
Sport	Gold	Silver	Bronze	Total
Athletics	2	1	1	4
Total	2	1	1	4

Medals by day
Day	Date	Gold	Silver	Bronze	Total
3	9 September	1	0	1	2
6	12 September	0	1	0	1
8	14 September	1	0	0	1
Total		2	1	1	4

Medals by gender
Gender	Gold	Silver	Bronze	Total
Male	1	1	1	3
Female	0	1	0	1
Total	2	1	1	4

== Competitors ==
India sent its largest ever delegation for the Summer Paralympic Games consisting of 19 athletes competing across five sports.

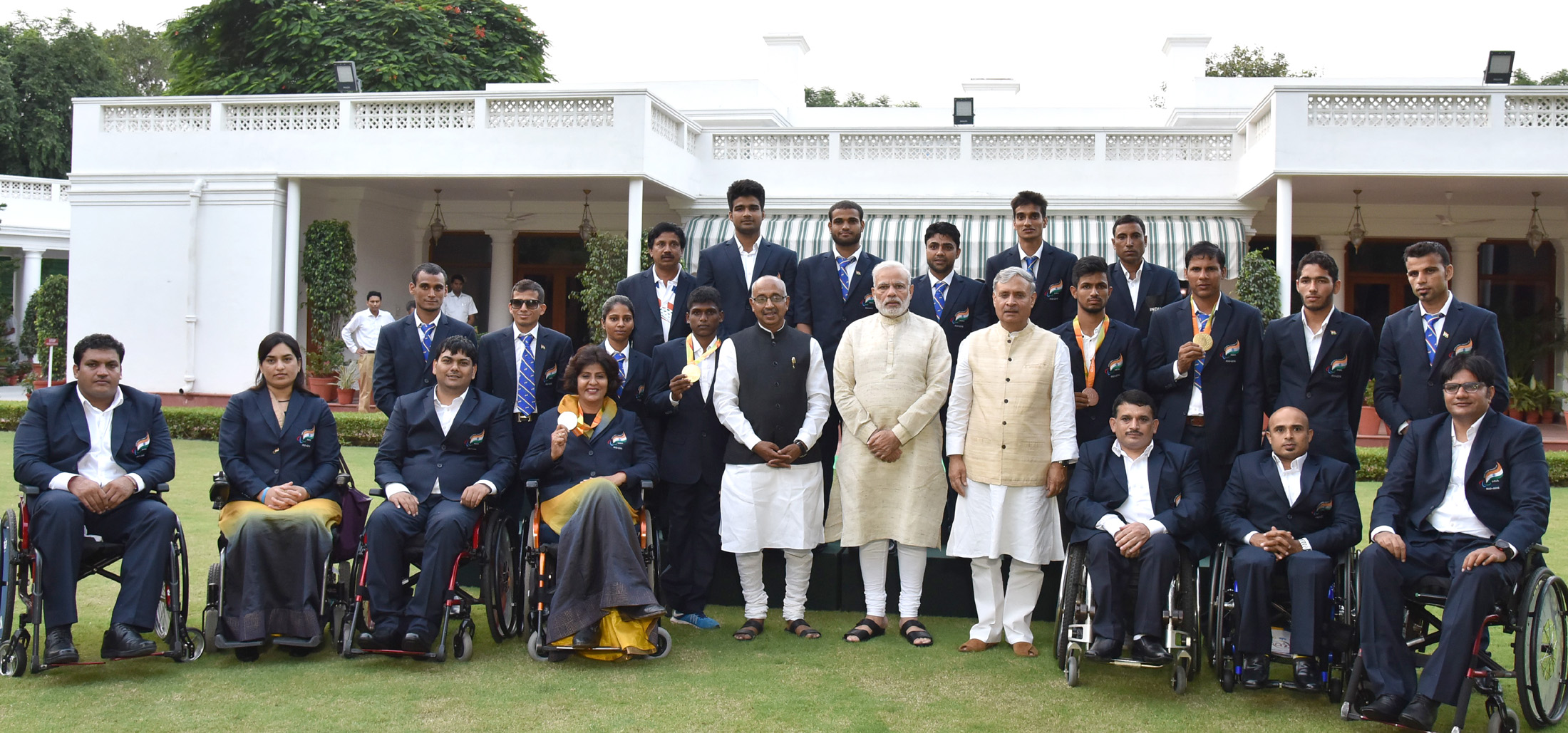
The Indian contingent with Prime Minister Narendra Modi

Sport	Men	Women	Total	Events
Archery	0	1	1	1
Athletics	13	2	15	11
Powerlifting	1	0	1	1
Swimming	1	0	1	1
Shooting	1	0	1	1
Total	16	3	19	15

== Archery ==
India achieved one berth in Women's individual recurve archery event after Pooja Khanna secured fifth-place finish in the final Paralympic qualifier held in Czechia and became first Indian para archer to qualify for the Paralympic Games.

Athlete	Event	Ranking round		Round of 32	Round of 16	Quarterfinals	Semifinals	Finals	
Athlete	Event	Score	Seed	Opposition score	Opposition score	Opposition score	Opposition score	Opposition score	Rank
Pooja Khanna	Women's recurve individual	513	29	Olszewska (POL); L 2–6	Did Not Advance				

== Athletics ==
About 15 Indian athletes achieved the qualifying standard for the Games.

Track events

Athlete	Event	Heat		Final	
Athlete	Event	Result	Rank	Result	Rank
Ankur Dhama	Men's 1500 m T11	4:37:60	2	Did Not Advance	

Field events

Athlete	Events	Result	Rank
Mariyappan Thangavelu	Men's high jump T42	1.89	1st place, gold medalist(s)
Varun Singh Bhati	Men's high jump T42	1.86 PB	3rd place, bronze medalist(s)
Sharad Kumar	Men's high jump T42	1.77	6
Ram Pal Chahar	Men's high jump T47	1.93 PB	6
Devendra Jhajharia	Men's javelin throw F46	63.97 WR	1st place, gold medalist(s)
Sundar Singh Gurjar	Men's javelin throw F46	DNS	
Rinku Hooda	Men's javelin throw F46	54.39 PB	5
Ranbir Narender	Men's javelin throw F42-44	53.79 PB	6
Sandeep Chaudhary	Men's javelin throw F42-44	54.30 PB	4
Virender Dhankar	Men's javelin throw F57	35.73	9
Virender Dhankar	Men's shot put F57	11.62	8
Amit Kumar Saroha	Men's discus throw F51/52	9.01	7
Amit Kumar Saroha	Men's club throw F51	26.63	4
Dharambir	Men's club throw F51	21.39	9
Deepa Malik	Women's shot put F53	4.61 PB	2nd place, silver medalist(s)
Karamjyoti Dalal	Women's discus throw F55	NM	

== Powerlifting ==
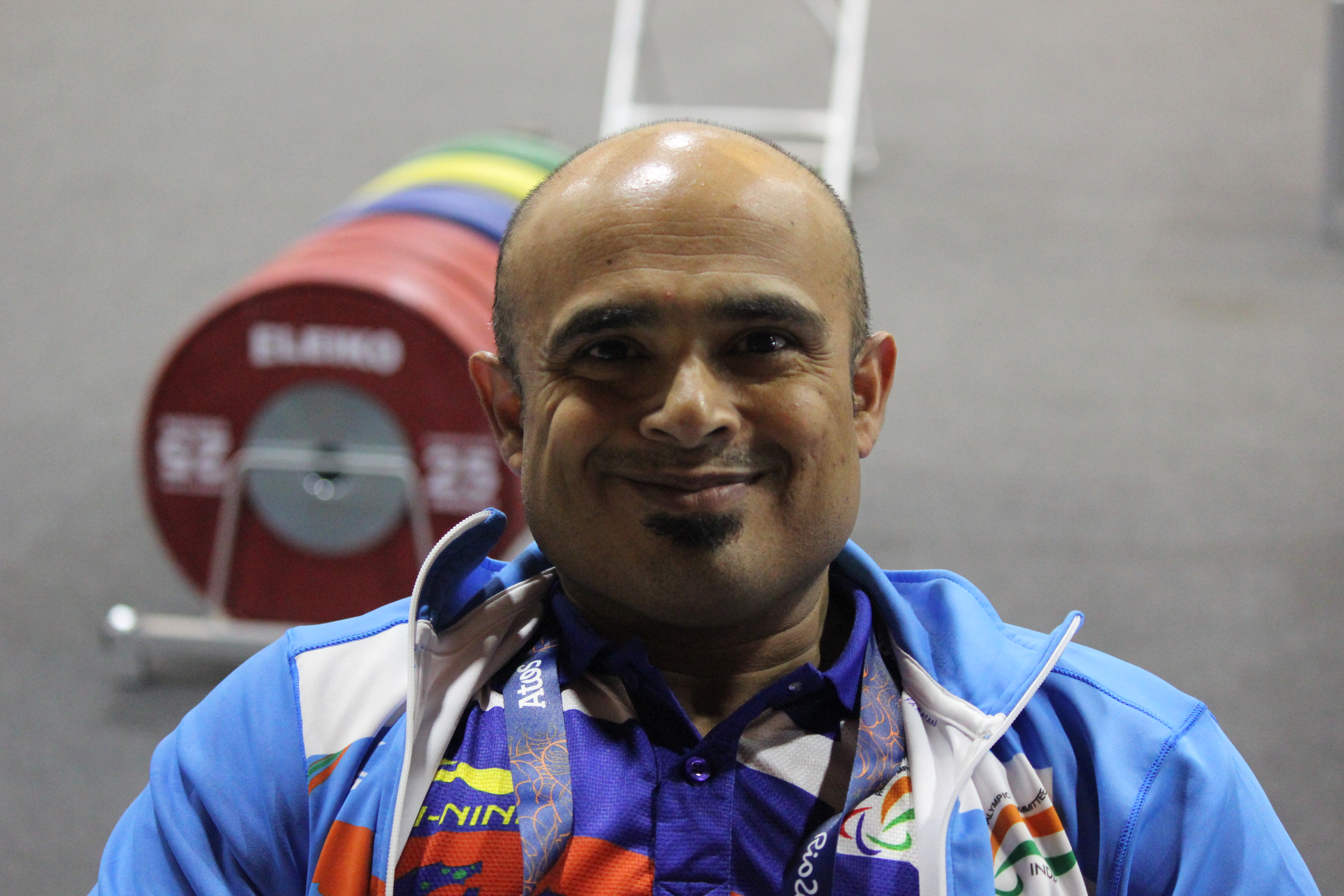
Farman Basha was the lone Indian competitor in Power lifting competitions.

India has one berth in the men's event after Farman Basha secured a place in the World Ranking list as of 29 February 2016.

Athlete	Event	Weight lifted (kg)	Rank
Farman Basha	Men's 49 kg	140	4

== Shooting ==
Naresh Sharma earned a qualifying berth for India in the last Paralympic qualifier event held at the 2015 IPC Shooting World Cup in Fort Benning, United States.

Athlete	Event	Qualification		Final	
Athlete	Event	Score	Rank	Score	Rank
Naresh Sharma	Men's 10m air rifle standing SH1	583.0	21	Did not advance	
Naresh Sharma	Mixed 10m air rifle prone SH1	606.5	44	Did not advance	
Naresh Sharma	Men's 50m rifle 3 positions SH1	1094	22	Did not advance	
Naresh Sharma	Mixed 50m rifle prone SH1	591.0	40	Did not advance	

== Swimming ==
Indian swimmer Suyash Jadhav achieved the 'A' qualifying mark in the finals of Men's 50m Butterfly S7 event at the International Wheelchair and Amputee Sports World Games 2015.

Athlete	Event	Heat		Final	
Athlete	Event	Time	Rank	Time	Rank
Suyash Jadhav	Men's 50 m freestyle S7	31.58	5	Did not advance	
Suyash Jadhav	Men's 50m butterfly S7	33.63	5	Did not advance	
Suyash Jadhav	Men's 200m Individual Medley- SM7	3:01:05	6	Did not advance	

== See also ==
- India at the 2016 Summer Olympics
