= India at the 2008 Summer Paralympics =

- IPC code: IND
- NPC: Paralympic Committee of India
- Website: Paralympic India

in Beijing September 6, 2008 – September 17, 2008
- Competitors: 5 in 3 sports
- Flag bearer: Rajinder Singh Rahelu
- Medals: Gold 0 Silver 0 Bronze 0 Total 0

Summer Paralympics appearances (overview)
- 1968; 1972; 1976–1980; 1984; 1988; 1992; 1996; 2000; 2004; 2008; 2012; 2016; 2020; 2024

India competed at the 2008 Summer Paralympics in Beijing from 6 to 17 September 2008. The nation made its official debut at the 1968 Summer Paralympics and has appeared in every edition of the Summer Paralympics since 1984. This is India's ninth appearance at the Summer Paralympics.

India sent a contingent consisting of five athletes competing across three sports in the Paralympic Games. Rajinder Singh Rahelu was the flag bearer during the opening ceremony. India did not win a medal in the Games.

== Background ==
The Paralympic Committee of India was formed in 1994, five years after the International Paralympic Committee was established in 1989. The nation made its Paralympics debut in 1968 and have appeared in every edition of the Summer Paralympic Games since 1984. This edition of the Games marked the nation's ninth appearance at the Summer Paralympics.

India had won seven medals across the previous Paralympic Games including two gold and silver medals each and three bronze medals. The Indian contingent for the Games consisted of five people. Rajinder Singh Rahelu was the flag bearer during the opening ceremony.

== Competitors ==
The Indian contingent for the Games consisted of five men who competed across three sports. India did not win a medal in the Games.

| Sport | Men | Women | Total |
|---|---|---|---|
| Athletics | 2 | 0 | 2 |
| Powerlifting | 2 | 0 | 2 |
| Shooting | 1 | 0 | 1 |
| Total | 5 | 0 | 5 |

== Athletics ==
| Athlete | Event | Heats | | Final | |
| Athlete | Event | Result | Rank | Result | Rank |
|---|---|---|---|---|---|
| Markanda Reddy | Men's 100 m T46 | 11.92 | 5 | Did not advance | |
| Jagseer Singh | Men's long jump F46 | — | | 6.40 | 7 |

== Powerlifting ==
| Athlete | Event | Result | Rank |
|---|---|---|---|
| Farman Basha | Men's 48 kg | 155.0 | 4 |
| Rajinder Singh Rahelu | Men's 60 kg | 170.0 | 5 |

== Shooting ==
| Athlete | Event | Qualification | | Final | | Rank |
| Athlete | Event | Score | Rank | Score | Total | Rank |
|---|---|---|---|---|---|---|
| Naresh Sharma | Mixed 50 metre rifle prone SH1 | 587 | 5 Q | 101.2 | 688.2 | 5 |
| Naresh Sharma | Men's 50 metre rifle 3 positions SH1 | 1088 | 26 | Did not advance | | |

Legend: Q = Qualified for the next phase

== See also ==
- India at the Paralympics
- India at the 2008 Summer Olympics
