= India at the Paralympics =

- IPC code: IND
- NPC: Paralympic Committee of India
- Website: Paralympic India
- Medals Ranked 54th: Gold 16 Silver 21 Bronze 23 Total 60

Summer appearances
- 1968; 1972; 1976–1980; 1984; 1988; 1992; 1996; 2000; 2004; 2008; 2012; 2016; 2020; 2024

India first participated in the 1968 Summer Paralympics. The nation has appeared in every edition of the Summer Paralympics since 1984. The Paris 2024 Games marked India's 13th appearance at the Paralympics. The country has never participated in the Winter Paralympic Games.

India's first medal in the Paralympics came in the 1972 Games, with Murlikant Petkar winning a gold medal in swimming. Up to the recent 2024 Games, India have won 60 medals across all Paralympic Games, with the most successful Paralympic campaign being the Paris 2024 Games with 29 medals including seven gold, nine silver and thirteen bronze.

== History ==
=== Stoke Mandeville Games (1960–1984) ===
The ninth International Stoke Mandville Games was later designated as the first Paralympics in 1960 and the International Stoke Mandeville Games Federation organized the Paralympic Games till 1984. India made its Paralympics debut in 1968. India's first medal came in the 1972 Games when Murlikant Petkar won the gold medal in the men's 50 meter freestyle event. India missed the subsequent two Summer Paralympic Games and returned in the 1984 edition. The nation has appeared in every edition of the Summer Paralympic Games since then while it has never participated in the Winter Paralympic Games. In the 1984 Games, Joginder Singh Bedi became the first Indian multi-medalist after he won a silver and two bronze medals in the athletics events. Bhimrao Kesarkar also won a silver medal in the javelin throw event to help record India's best finish till then with four medals.

=== Early Paralympic Games (1988–2000) ===
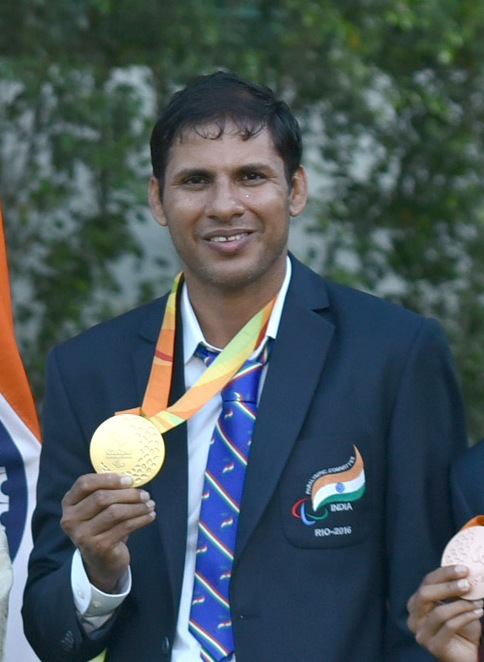
Devendra Jhajharia is the most decorated Indian para athlete with two gold and one silver medals.

The 1988 Seoul Paralympics was the first to use the Paralympics name and the event has been held in the same host city as the corresponding Summer Olympic Games since then. The Paralympic Committee of India (PCI) was formed in 1994, five years after the International Paralympic Committee (IPC) was established in 1989. India continued to participate in each Paralympic Games thereafter, but failed to win a medal until the 2004 Games.

=== Early 21st century (2004–2016) ===
In 2004, India won two medals with Devendra Jhajharia winning a gold medal in the javelin throw event and Rajinder Singh Rahelu securing a bronze medal in powerlifting. The only Indian medal across the next two editions came from Girisha Nagarajegowda, who won a silver medal in the Men's high jump F42 event at the 2012 Games.

India sent a delegation of 19 athletes for the 2016 Summer Paralympics. India won four medals in the event and the Games also marked the first instance of India winning two gold medals. Mariyappan Thangavelu won the first gold medal in the Men's high jump T42 event. Devendra Jhajharia became the first Indian to win multiple gold medals after his win in the Men's javelin throw F46 event. Deepa Malik and Varun Bhati were the other medalists with a silver and bronze medal respectively. Malik became the first Indian woman medalist in the Paralympic Games.

=== Tokyo Games (2020) ===
The Indian contingent for the 2020 Games consisted of 54 people across nine sports. This was the nation's most successful Games ever with 19 medals including five gold, eight silver and six bronze medals before the Paris 2024 Games. Bhavina Patel won India's first medal, a silver in Table Tennis. Avani Lekhara became the first Indian woman paralympic athlete to win a gold medal and she won another bronze medal to become the first Indian woman multiple medalist in Paralympic shooting. Shooter Manish Narwal won another gold medal in 50 m pistol SH1 event and Singhraj Adhana won two shooting medals, a silver and a bronze. Harvinder Singh became the first Indian to win a medal in Paralympic archery after he won a bronze medal in the men's recurve event.

In badminton, Indian shuttlers won four medals including two gold medals by Pramod Bhagat and Krishna Nagar, a silver medal by Suhas Yathiraj and a bronze medal by Manoj Sarkar. In athletics, India won eight medals including one gold, five silver and two bronze medals. Sumit Antil won a gold medal in Javelin throw F64 with a new world record. Mariyappan Thangavelu and Devendra Jhajharia won silver medals to go along with the gold medals they won in the 2016 Games. This was Jhajharia third medal, which is the most by an Indian Para athlete in the Paralympic Games along with Joginder Singh Bedi. Nishad Kumar and Praveen Kumar won silver medals and Sharad Kumar and Sundar Singh Gurjar were the other bronze medalists.

=== Paris Games (2024) ===
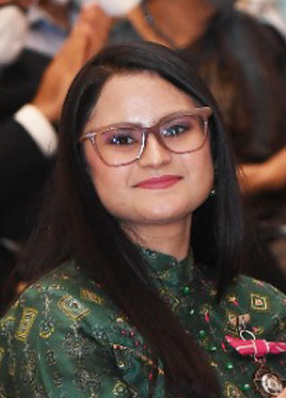
Avani Lekhara is the only Indian female athlete to win three medals including multiple gold medals.

India sent its largest contingent for the 2024 Games consisting of 84 people competing across 12 sports. India has won 29 medals with seven gold, nine silver, and thirteen bronze medals making them the most successful Games ever. Avani Lekhara won a gold medal in shooting for the second consecutive Games and became the first Indian woman paralympic athlete to win back-to-back gold and multiple medals. Kumar Nitesh won a gold medal in badminton at the men's singles SL3 event. Sumit Antil became the first Indian male athlete to defend a title at the Paralympics after he won the gold medal in the men's javelin throw F64 event, while setting two Paralympic records in the process.

Shooter Manish Narwal won a silver medal, his second medal after his gold medal in the 2020 Games. Nishad Kumar and Yogesh Kathuniya won silver medals at the men's high jump T47 and the men's discus throw F56 events respectively, in a repeat of their performance from Tokyo 2020. Suhas Yathiraj also won a silver medal for the second consecutive Games in the men's singles SL4 para-badminton event. Thulasimathi Murugesan won the first para-badminton silver medal at the women's singles SU5 event. Ajeet Singh Yadav and Sundar Singh Gurjar won the silver and bronze medals respectively in the men's javelin throw F46 event. This was Gurjar's second medal after he finished third in the same event in the previous Games. Sharad Kumar won his second Paralympic medal, a silver in the men's high jump T63 event. Mariyappan Thangavelu won a medal at his third successive Paralympic Games with a bronze in the same event. Sachin Khilari won India's fifth athletics silver medal, finishing second in the men's shot put F46 event.

Preethi Pal won India's first track medals at athletics by clinching two bronze medals in the women's 100m and 200m T35 events. Mona Agarwal and Rubina Francis also won bronze medals in shooting. Sheetal Devi became the youngest Indian Paralympic medalist after she won a bronze medal in the compound archery event along with Rakesh Kumar. Manisha Ramadass and Nithya Sivan won bronze medals in women's para-badminton events. Deepthi Jeevanji won the bronze medal at the women's 400 m T20 race and became the youngest Indian track medalist at the Paralympic Games.

== Medal table ==
Games	Athletes	Gold	Silver	Bronze	Total	Rank
(Italy) 1960 Rome	Did not participate					
(Japan) 1964 Tokyo	Did not participate					
(Israel) 1968 Tel Aviv	10	0	0	0	0	X
(Germany) 1972 Heidelberg	10	1	0	0	1	25
(Canada) 1976 Toronto	Did not participate					
(Netherlands) 1980 Arnhem	Did not participate					
(United Kingdom) / (United States) 1984 Stoke Mandeville / New York	5	0	2	2	4	37
(South Korea) 1988 Seoul	2	0	0	0	0	X
(Spain) 1992 Barcelona	9	0	0	0	0	X
(United States) 1996 Atlanta	9	0	0	0	0	X
(Australia) 2000 Sydney	4	0	0	0	0	X
(Greece) 2004 Athens	12	1	0	1	2	53
(China) 2008 Beijing	5	0	0	0	0	X
(United Kingdom) 2012 London	10	0	1	0	1	67
(Brazil) 2016 Rio de Janeiro	19	2	1	1	4	43
(Japan) 2020 Tokyo	54	5	8	6	19	24
(France) 2024 Paris	84	7	9	13	29	18
(United States) 2028 Los Angeles	Future events					
(Australia) 2032 Brisbane	Future events					
Total	233	16	21	23	60	56

== Medals by sport ==
Medals by sport
Sport	Gold	Silver	Bronze	Total
Athletics	8	16	13	35
Badminton	3	3	3	9
Shooting	3	2	4	9
Archery	1	0	2	3
Swimming	1	0	0	1
Table tennis	0	1	0	1
Powerlifting	0	0	1	1
Judo	0	0	1	1
Total	16	21	23	60

== List of medalists ==
Here is the complete list of Indian medalists at the Olympics over the years.

Medal	Medalist	Games	Sport	Event
(gold) Gold	Murlikant Petkar	(Germany) 1972 Heidelberg	Swimming	Men's 50 m freestyle 3
(silver) Silver	Bhimrao Kesarkar	(United Kingdom) (United States) 1984 Stoke Mandeville / New York	Athletics	Men's javelin throw L6
(silver) Silver	Joginder Singh Bedi	(United Kingdom) (United States) 1984 Stoke Mandeville / New York	Athletics	Men's shot put L6
(bronze) Bronze	Joginder Singh Bedi	(United Kingdom) (United States) 1984 Stoke Mandeville / New York	Athletics	Men's javelin throw L6
(bronze) Bronze	Joginder Singh Bedi	(United Kingdom) (United States) 1984 Stoke Mandeville / New York	Athletics	Men's discus throw L6
(gold) Gold	Devendra Jhajharia	(Greece) 2004 Athens	Athletics	Men's javelin throw F42-46
(bronze) Bronze	Rajinder Singh Rahelu	(Greece) 2004 Athens	Powerlifting	Men's 56 kg
(silver) Silver	Girisha Nagarajegowda	(United Kingdom) 2012 London	Athletics	Men's high jump F42
(gold) Gold	Mariyappan Thangavelu	(Brazil) 2016 Rio de Janeiro	Athletics	Men's high jump F42
(gold) Gold	Devendra Jhajharia	(Brazil) 2016 Rio de Janeiro	Athletics	Men's javelin throw F46
(silver) Silver	Deepa Malik	(Brazil) 2016 Rio de Janeiro	Athletics	Women's shot put F53
(bronze) Bronze	Varun Singh Bhati	(Brazil) 2016 Rio de Janeiro	Athletics	Men's high jump F42
(gold) Gold	Avani Lekhara	(Japan) 2020 Tokyo	Shooting	Women's R2 10 m air rifle standing SH1
(gold) Gold	Manish Narwal	(Japan) 2020 Tokyo	Shooting	Mixed 50m Pistol SH1
(gold) Gold	Sumit Antil	(Japan) 2020 Tokyo	Athletics	Men's javelin throw F64
(gold) Gold	Pramod Bhagat	(Japan) 2020 Tokyo	Badminton	Men's singles SL3
(gold) Gold	Krishna Nagar	(Japan) 2020 Tokyo	Badminton	Men's singles SH6
(silver) Silver	Bhavina Patel	(Japan) 2020 Tokyo	Table Tennis	Women's singles C4
(silver) Silver	Nishad Kumar	(Japan) 2020 Tokyo	Athletics	Men's high jump T47
(silver) Silver	Yogesh Kathuniya	(Japan) 2020 Tokyo	Athletics	Men's discus throw F56
(silver) Silver	Devendra Jhajharia	(Japan) 2020 Tokyo	Athletics	Men's javelin throw F46
(silver) Silver	Mariyappan Thangavelu	(Japan) 2020 Tokyo	Athletics	Men's high jump T63
(silver) Silver	Praveen Kumar	(Japan) 2020 Tokyo	Athletics	Men's high jump T64
(silver) Silver	Singhraj Adhana	(Japan) 2020 Tokyo	Shooting	Mixed P4 50 m pistol SH1
(silver) Silver	Suhas Yathiraj	(Japan) 2020 Tokyo	Badminton	Men's singles SL4
(bronze) Bronze	Sundar Singh Gurjar	(Japan) 2020 Tokyo	Athletics	Men's javelin throw F46
(bronze) Bronze	Sharad Kumar	(Japan) 2020 Tokyo	Athletics	Men's high jump T63
(bronze) Bronze	Singhraj Adhana	(Japan) 2020 Tokyo	Shooting	Men's P1 10 m air pistol SH1
(bronze) Bronze	Avani Lekhara	(Japan) 2020 Tokyo	Shooting	Women's R8 50 m rifle 3 positions SH1
(bronze) Bronze	Harvinder Singh	(Japan) 2020 Tokyo	Archery	Men's individual recurve open
(bronze) Bronze	Manoj Sarkar	(Japan) 2020 Tokyo	Badminton	Men's singles SL3
(gold) Gold	Avani Lekhara	(France) 2024 Paris	Shooting	Women's R2 10 m air rifle standing SH1
(gold) Gold	Kumar Nitesh	(France) 2024 Paris	Badminton	Men's singles SL3
(gold) Gold	Sumit Antil	(France) 2024 Paris	Athletics	Men's javelin throw F64
(gold) Gold	Harvinder Singh	(France) 2024 Paris	Archery	Men's individual recurve open
(gold) Gold	Dharambir Nain	(France) 2024 Paris	Athletics	Men's club throw F51
(gold) Gold	Praveen Kumar	(France) 2024 Paris	Athletics	Men's high jump T64
(gold) Gold	Navdeep Singh	(France) 2024 Paris	Athletics	Men's javelin throw F41
(silver) Silver	Manish Narwal	(France) 2024 Paris	Shooting	Men's P1 10 m air pistol SH1
(silver) Silver	Nishad Kumar	(France) 2024 Paris	Athletics	Men's high jump T47
(silver) Silver	Yogesh Kathuniya	(France) 2024 Paris	Athletics	Men's discus throw F56
(silver) Silver	Thulasimathi Murugesan	(France) 2024 Paris	Badminton	Women's singles SU5
(silver) Silver	Suhas Yathiraj	(France) 2024 Paris	Badminton	Men's singles SL4
(silver) Silver	Ajeet Singh Yadav	(France) 2024 Paris	Athletics	Men's javelin throw F46
(silver) Silver	Sharad Kumar	(France) 2024 Paris	Athletics	Men's high jump T63
(silver) Silver	Sachin Khilari	(France) 2024 Paris	Athletics	Men's shot put F46
(silver) Silver	Pranav Soorma	(France) 2024 Paris	Athletics	Men's club throw F51
(bronze) Bronze	Preethi Pal	(France) 2024 Paris	Athletics	Women's 100 m T35
(bronze) Bronze	Preethi Pal	(France) 2024 Paris	Athletics	Women's 200 m T35
(bronze) Bronze	Mona Agarwal	(France) 2024 Paris	Shooting	Women's R2 10 m air rifle standing SH1
(bronze) Bronze	Rubina Francis	(France) 2024 Paris	Shooting	Women's P2 10 m air pistol SH1
(bronze) Bronze	Manisha Ramadass	(France) 2024 Paris	Badminton	Women's singles SU5
(bronze) Bronze	Nithya Sre Sivan	(France) 2024 Paris	Badminton	Women's singles SH6
(bronze) Bronze	Sheetal Devi; Rakesh Kumar	(France) 2024 Paris	Archery	Mixed team compound
(bronze) Bronze	Deepthi Jeevanji	(France) 2024 Paris	Athletics	Women's 400 m T20
(bronze) Bronze	Simran Sharma	(France) 2024 Paris	Athletics	Women's 200 m T12
(bronze) Bronze	Hokato Hotozhe Sema	(France) 2024 Paris	Athletics	Men's shot put F57
(bronze) Bronze	Sundar Singh Gurjar	(France) 2024 Paris	Athletics	Men's javelin throw F46
(bronze) Bronze	Mariyappan Thangavelu	(France) 2024 Paris	Athletics	Men's high jump T63
(bronze) Bronze	Kapil Parmar	(France) 2024 Paris	Judo	Men's J1 -60 kg

== Multiple medalists and milestones ==
Multiple medalists
Athlete	Sport	Games	(gold) Gold	(silver) Silver	(bronze) Bronze	Total
Devendra Jhajharia	Athletics	2004, 2016, 2020	2	1	0	3
Avani Lekhara	Shooting	2020, 2024	2	0	1	3
Sumit Antil	Athletics	2020, 2024	2	0	0	2
Mariyappan Thangavelu	Athletics	2016, 2020, 2024	1	1	1	3
Manish Narwal	Shooting	2020, 2024	1	1	0	2
Praveen Kumar	Athletics	2020, 2024	1	1	0	2
Harvinder Singh	Archery	2020, 2024	1	0	1	2
Nishad Kumar	Athletics	2020, 2024	0	2	0	2
Yogesh Kathuniya	Athletics	2020, 2024	0	2	0	2
Suhas Yathiraj	Badminton	2020, 2024	0	2	0	2
Joginder Singh Bedi	Athletics	1984	0	1	2	3
Singhraj Adhana	Shooting	2020	0	1	1	2
Sharad Kumar	Athletics	2020, 2024	0	1	1	2
Preethi Pal	Athletics	2024	0	0	2	2
Sundar Singh Gurjar	Athletics	2020, 2024	0	0	2	2

=== Milestones ===
Milestone	Athlete	Game(s)	Sport	Medal(s)	Ref
First medalist	Murlikant Petkar	(Germany) 1972 Heidelberg	Swimming	(gold) Gold	
First gold medalist	Murlikant Petkar	(Germany) 1972 Heidelberg	Swimming	(gold) Gold	
First multi-medalist	Joginder Singh Bedi	(United Kingdom) (United States) 1984 Stoke Mandeville / New York	Athletics	(silver) Silver; (bronze) Bronze; (bronze) Bronze	
First multiple gold medalist	Devendra Jhajharia	(Greece) 2004 Athens (Brazil) 2016 Rio de Janeiro	Athletics	(gold) Gold; (gold) Gold	
First double podium finish	Mariyappan Thangavelu	(Brazil) 2016 Rio de Janeiro	Athletics	(gold) Gold	
First double podium finish	Varun Singh Bhati	(Brazil) 2016 Rio de Janeiro	Athletics	(bronze) Bronze	
First woman medalist	Deepa Malik	(Brazil) 2016 Rio de Janeiro	Athletics	(silver) Silver	
First one-two finish	Manish Narwal	(Japan) 2020 Tokyo	Shooting	(gold) Gold	
First one-two finish	Singhraj Adhana	(Japan) 2020 Tokyo	Shooting	(silver) Silver	
First woman gold medalist	Avani Lekhara	(Japan) 2020 Tokyo	Shooting	(gold) Gold; (bronze) Bronze	
First woman multi-medalist	Avani Lekhara	(Japan) 2020 Tokyo	Shooting	(gold) Gold; (bronze) Bronze	
First woman multiple gold medalist	Avani Lekhara	(Japan) 2020 Tokyo (France) 2024 Paris	Shooting	(gold) Gold; (gold) Gold	
First double podium finish in a women's event	Avani Lekhara	(France) 2024 Paris	Shooting	(gold) Gold	
First double podium finish in a women's event	Mona Agarwal	(France) 2024 Paris	Shooting	(bronze) Bronze	

== See also ==
- India at the Olympics
- India at the Deaflympics
- India at the Youth Olympics
- India at the World Games
- India at the Asian Games
- India at the Asian Para Games
- India at the Asian Youth Games
- India at the Commonwealth Games
- India at the Lusofonia Games
- India at the South Asian Games
