= India at the 1988 Summer Paralympics =

- IPC code: IND
- NPC: Paralympic Committee of India
- Website: Paralympic India

in Seoul October 15, 1988 – October 24, 1988
- Competitors: 2 in 2 sports
- Medals: Gold 0 Silver 0 Bronze 0 Total 0

Summer Paralympics appearances (overview)
- 1968; 1972; 1976–1980; 1984; 1988; 1992; 1996; 2000; 2004; 2008; 2012; 2016; 2020; 2024

India competed at the 1988 Summer Paralympics in Seoul from 15 to 24 October 1988. The nation made its official debut at the 1968 Summer Paralympics and made its previous appearance in the 1984 Games. This was India's fourth appearance at the Summer Paralympics. India sent a contingent consisting of two athletes for the Games and did not win any medal.

== Background ==
The 1988 Summer Paralympics was the first to use the Paralympics name officially and the first time the event was held in the same host city as the corresponding Summer Olympic Games after 24 years. The International Paralympic Committee was officially established after the Games in 1989. The Paralympic Committee of India was established five years later in 1994. India made its Paralympics debut in 1968 and made its previous appearance in the 1984 Games. This edition of the Games marked the nation's fourth appearance at the Summer Paralympics.

India had won five medals across the previous Paralympic Games including one gold, two silver and bronze medals each. The Indian contingent for the Games consisted of two athletes.

== Competitors ==
The Indian contingent for the Games consisted of two athletes - one per gender, who competed across two sports.

Sport	Men	Women	Total
Athletics	1	1	2
Lawn bowls	1	0	1
Total	1 (Note: Digambar Mehendale competed in both athletics and lawn bowls.)	1	2

== Athletics ==
Track

Athlete	Event	Result	Rank
Malathi Holla	Women's 200 m A1-3A9L2	53.54	8

Field

Athlete	Event	Result	Rank
Digambar Mehendale	Men's discus throw A1-3A9L3	14.32	8

== Lawn bowls ==
Athlete	Event	Group Stage				Final / BM	
Athlete	Event	Opposition Score	Opposition Score	Opposition Score	Rank	Opposition Score	Rank
Digambar Mehendale	Men's singles LB1	Foster (GBR); L (0–21)	Lee (KOR); L (6-21)	Bould (GBR); L (8-21)	4	Did not advance	

Legend: W = Win; L = Loss; Q = Qualified for the next phase

== See also ==
- India at the Paralympics
- India at the 1988 Summer Olympics
