= India at the 1992 Summer Paralympics =

- IPC code: IND
- NPC: Paralympic Committee of India
- Website: Paralympic India

in Barcelona September 3, 1992 – September 14, 1992
- Competitors: 9 in 2 sports
- Medals: Gold 0 Silver 0 Bronze 0 Total 0

Summer Paralympics appearances (overview)
- 1968; 1972; 1976–1980; 1984; 1988; 1992; 1996; 2000; 2004; 2008; 2012; 2016; 2020; 2024

India competed at the 1992 Summer Paralympics in Barcelona from 3 to 14 September 1992. The nation made its official debut at the 1968 Summer Paralympics and has appeared in every edition of the Summer Paralympics since 1984. This was India's fifth appearance at the Summer Paralympics. India sent a contingent consisting of nine athletes for the Games and did not win any medal.

== Background ==
The International Paralympic Committee was established in 1989. The Paralympic Committee of India was established only in 1994, two years after the Games. The nation made its Paralympics debut in 1968 and have appeared in every edition of the Summer Paralympic Games since 1984. This edition of the Games marked the nation's fifth appearance at the Summer Paralympics.

India had won five medals across the previous Paralympic Games including one gold, two silver and bronze medals each. The Indian contingent for the Games consisted of nine athletes.

== Competitors ==
The Indian contingent for the Games consisted of nine athletes - seven men and two women, who competed across two sports.

Sport	Men	Women	Total
Athletics	7	2	9
Powerlifting	1	0	1
Total	7 (Note: Vijay Munishwar competed in both athletics and powerlifting.)	2	9

== Athletics ==
Track

Athlete	Event	Heat		Final	
Athlete	Event	Result	Rank	Result	Rank
Malathi Holla	Women's 200 m TW4	DNS		Did not advance	
Malathi Holla	Men's 200 m TS4	DNS		Did not advance	
Manveer Mangat	Men's 100 m TS4	12.88	7	Did not advance	
Ramnath Banerjee	Men's 100 m TS4	DNS		Did not advance	
Ramnath Banerjee	Men's 200 m TS4	2:09.30	5	Did not advance	
Ratna Ghosh	Women's 100 m TS4	17.43	4	Did not advance	

Field

Athlete	Event	Result	Rank
Digambar Mehendale	Men's discus throw THW7	18.88	20
Digambar Mehendale	Men's javelin throw THW7	20.48	19
Digambar Mehendale	Men's shot put THW7	6.86	16
Malathi Holla	Women's discus throw THW7	12.74	12
Mallaiah Mahadeva	Men's discus throw THS7	22.90	7
Mallaiah Mahadeva	Men's javelin throw THS7	28.46	6
Mallaiah Mahadeva	Men's shot put THS7	8.30	7
Manveer Mangat	Men's javelin throw THS7	22.96	7
Manveer Mangat	Men's shot put THS7	10.35	6
Rajesh Anand	Men's discus throw THW7	14.32	21
Rajesh Anand	Men's javelin throw THW7	18.88	21
Rajesh Anand	Men's shot put THW7	5.91	17
Vijay Munishwar	Men's shot put THS2	9.82	11

== Powerlifting ==
Athlete	Event	Result	Rank
Vijay Munishwar	Men's 75 kg	122.5	7

== See also ==
- India at the Paralympics
- India at the 1992 Summer Olympics
