= India at the 2000 Summer Paralympics =

- IPC code: IND
- NPC: Paralympic Committee of India
- Website: Paralympic India

in Sydney October 18, 2000 – October 29, 2000
- Competitors: 4 in 3 sports
- Medals: Gold 0 Silver 0 Bronze 0 Total 0

Summer Paralympics appearances (overview)
- 1968; 1972; 1976–1980; 1984; 1988; 1992; 1996; 2000; 2004; 2008; 2012; 2016; 2020; 2024

India competed at the 2000 Summer Paralympics in Sydney from 18 to 29 October 2000. The nation made its official debut at the 1968 Summer Paralympics and has appeared in every edition of the Summer Paralympics since 1984. This was India's seventh appearance at the Summer Paralympics. India sent a contingent consisting of four athletes for the Games and did not win any medal.

== Background ==
The Paralympic Committee of India was formed in 1994, five years after the International Paralympic Committee was established in 1989. The nation made its Paralympics debut in 1968 and have appeared in every edition of the Summer Paralympic Games since 1984. This edition of the Games marked the nation's seventh appearance at the Summer Paralympics.

India had won five medals across the previous Paralympic Games including one gold, two silver and bronze medals each. The Indian contingent for the Games consisted of four people.

== Competitors ==
The Indian contingent for the Games consisted of four athletes - all men, who competed across three sports.

| Sport | Men | Women | Total |
|---|---|---|---|
| Athletics | 1 | 0 | 1 |
| Powerlifting | 2 | 0 | 2 |
| Shooting | 1 | 0 | 1 |
| Total | 4 | 0 | 4 |

== Athletics ==
| Athlete | Event | Result | Rank |
|---|---|---|---|
| Yadvendra Vashishta | Men's discus throw F42 | 43.15 | 6 |
| Yadvendra Vashishta | Men's shot put F44 | DQ | |

== Powerlifting ==
| Athlete | Event | Result | Rank |
|---|---|---|---|
| Vikram Singh Adhikari | Men's 56 kg | 130.0 | 14 |
| Vijay Munishwar | Men's 90 kg | 160.0 | 13 |

== Shooting ==
| Athlete | Event | Qualification | | Final | | Rank |
| Athlete | Event | Score | Rank | Score | Total | Rank |
|---|---|---|---|---|---|---|
| Naresh Sharma | Mixed sport pistol SH1 | 540 | 16 | Did not advance | | |

== See also ==
- 2000 Summer Paralympics
- India at the 2000 Summer Olympics
- Sport in India
