= India at the 1968 Summer Paralympics =

- IPC code: IND
- NPC: Paralympic Committee of India
- Website: Paralympic India

in Tel Aviv November 4, 1968 – November 13, 1968
- Competitors: 10 in 6 sports
- Medals: Gold 0 Silver 0 Bronze 0 Total 0

Summer Paralympics appearances (overview)
- 1968; 1972; 1976–1980; 1984; 1988; 1992; 1996; 2000; 2004; 2008; 2012; 2016; 2020; 2024

India competed at the 1968 Summer Paralympics held in Tel Aviv from 4 to 13 November 1968. The nation made its official debut at the 1968 Games. India sent a contingent consisting of ten athletes for the Games and did not win a medal.

== Background ==
The ninth International Stoke Mandville Games was later designated as the first Paralympics in 1960 and the International Stoke Mandeville Games Federation organized the 1968 Games. India made its Paralympics debut in the 1968 Games. India sent ten competitors including eight males and two females. The team did not win any medals.

== Competitors ==
The Indian contingent for the Games consisted of ten athletes who competed across six sports.

Sport	Men	Women	Total
Archery	4	0	4
Athletics	7	2	9
Dartchery	4	0	4
Swimming	2	1	3
Table tennis	1	1	2
Weightlifting	1	0	1
Total (Note: Some athletes participated in multiple sports, hence individual counts might not add up to the total.)	8	2	10

== Archery ==
Athlete	Event	Score	Rank
Ganesh	Men's St. Nicholas round paraplegic	65	27
Jeena	Men's Columbia round open	45	40
Laxman	Men's Columbia round open	49	39
Patel	Women's St. Nicholas round paraplegic	61	13

== Athletics ==
Field

Athlete	Event	Qualification			Final		
Athlete	Event	Result	Points	Rank	Result	Points	Rank
Ganesh	Men's club throw A	19.77	—	37	Did not qualify		
Ganesh	Men's javelin A	11.12	—	30	Did not qualify		
Ganesh	Men's shot put A	3.53	—	37	Did not qualify		
Gattu	Men's precision javelin open	—	62	38	Did not qualify		
Jeena	Men's club throw C	18.32	—	43	Did not qualify		
Jeena	Men's javelin C	8.64	—	45	Did not qualify		
Jeena	Men's shot put C	3.17	—	50	Did not qualify		
Jeena	Men's precision javelin open	—	64	27	Did not qualify		
Khan	Men's club throw C	20.66	—	37	Did not qualify		
Khan	Men's discus throw C	10.54	—	50	Did not qualify		
Khan	Men's javelin C	8.58	—	46	Did not qualify		
Kumar	Men's club throw C	13.39	—	45	Did not qualify		
Kumar	Men's javelin C	6.20	—	47	Did not qualify		
Kumar	Men's shot put C	3.16	—	51	Did not qualify		
Laxman	Men's club throw D	23.77	—	24	Did not qualify		
Laxman	Men's javelin D	12.05	—	24	Did not qualify		
Laxman	Men's shot put D	3.70	—	24	Did not qualify		
Laxman	Men's precision javelin open	—	54	57	Did not qualify		
Patel	Women's club throw A	10.45	—	17	Did not qualify		
Patel	Women's discus throw A	6.11	—	17	Did not qualify		
Patel	Women's javelin A	5.44	—	16	Did not qualify		
Patel	Women's shot put A	2.63	—	20	Did not qualify		
Patel	Women's precision javelin open	—	4	51	Did not qualify		
Pereira	Men's club throw A	32.61	—	4 Q	NM		
Shehrnaz Kermani	Women's precision javelin open	—	60	31	Did not qualify		

Legend: Q = Qualified for the next phase

== Dartchery ==
Athlete/Team	Event	Round of 16	Quarterfinals	Semifinals	Final / BM	
Athlete/Team	Event	Opposition Result	Opposition Result	Opposition Result	Opposition Result	Rank
Ganesh; Jeena	Mixed pairs open	South/Conn (AUS); Lost	Did not advance			
Kumar; Laxman	Mixed pairs open	Koten/Sala (ITA); Lost	Did not advance			

== Swimming ==
Athlete	Event	Heat		Final	
Athlete	Event	Result	Rank	Result	Rank
Jeena	Men's 50 m freestyle class 4 incomplete	58.50	2	Did not qualify	
Kumar	Men's 50 m backstroke class 4 incomplete	2:04.90	5	Did not qualify	
Shehrnaz Kermani	Women's 50 m freestyle special class	1:38.30	4	Did not qualify	
Shehrnaz Kermani	Women's 50 m backstroke special class	1:34.50	4	Did not qualify	
Shehrnaz Kermani	Women's 50 m breaststroke special class	1:47.60	6	Did not qualify	
Shehrnaz Kermani	Women's 100 m breaststroke open	—		3:57.20	4

== Table tennis ==
Athlete/Team	Event	Round of 32	Round of 16	Quarterfinals	Semifinals	Final / BM	
Athlete/Team	Event	Opposition Result	Opposition Result	Opposition Result	Opposition Result	Opposition Result	Rank
Murlikant Petkar	Men's singles C	Telsnig (AUT); Lost	Did not advance				
Patel	Women's singles B	—	Schweiger (FRG); Won	Ramousse (FRA); Lost	Did not advance		

== Weightlifting ==
Athlete	Event	Result	Rank
Makandi	Men's featherweight	90	11

== See also ==
- India at the 1968 Summer Olympics
