= India at the 1972 Summer Paralympics =

- IPC code: IND
- NPC: Paralympic Committee of India
- Website: Paralympic India

in Heidelberg August 2, 1972 – August 11, 1972
- Competitors: 10 in 5 sports
- Medals Ranked 25th: Gold 1 Silver 0 Bronze 0 Total 1

Summer Paralympics appearances (overview)
- 1968; 1972; 1976–1980; 1984; 1988; 1992; 1996; 2000; 2004; 2008; 2012; 2016; 2020; 2024

India competed at the 1972 Summer Paralympics held in Heidelberg from 2 to 11 August 1972. The nation made its official debut at the last Paralympic Games in 1968. This was India's second consecutive appearance at the Summer Games for the disabled. India sent a contingent consisting of ten athletes for the Games and won a single gold medal.

== Background ==
The ninth International Stoke Mandville Games was later designated as the first Paralympics in 1960 and the International Stoke Mandeville Games Federation organized the 1972 Games. India made its Paralympics debut in the previous Games in 1968. India sent ten competitors including seven males and three females.

== Medalist ==
India won its first ever Paralympic medal when Murlikant Petkar won the gold medal in the men's 50 meter freestyle event.

Medal	Name	Sport	Event
Gold	Murlikant Petkar	Swimming	Men's 50 m freestyle 3

== Competitors ==
The Indian contingent for the Games consisted of ten athletes who competed across five sports.

Sport	Men	Women	Total
Archery	0	1	1
Athletics	6	2	8
Swimming	1	0	1
Table tennis	2	0	2
Weightlifting	1	0	1
Total	7 (Note: Petkar participated in athletics and swimming.; Makandi participated in athletics and weightlifting.; Patel participated in athletics and archery.)	3	10

== Archery ==
Athlete	Event	Score	Rank
Patel	Women's St. Nicholas round paraplegic	31	8

== Athletics ==
Track

Athlete	Event	Heat		Final	
Athlete	Event	Result	Rank	Result	Rank
Chandrashekhar	Men's 100 m 2	1:28.40	22	Did not advance	
Magan Gina	Men's 100 m 3	48.80	41	Did not advance	
Murlikant Petkar	Men's slalom 3	—		1:20.10	26

Field

Athlete	Event	Result	Points	Rank
Diwan	Men's shot put 2	2.72	—	24
Makandi	Men's shot put 4	4.25	—	36
Makandi	Men's precision javelin open	—	1	68
Murlikant Petkar	Men's precision javelin open	—	26	55
Murlikant Petkar	Men's javelin 3	15.07	—	15
Murlikant Petkar	Men's shot put 3	6.20	—	12
Patel	Women's precision javelin open	—	12	51
Patel	Women's javelin 3	6.08	—	30
Patel	Women's shot put 3	2.88	—	30
Poudwal	Men's javelin 5	8.10	—	26
Poudwal	Men's shot put 5	3.95	—	28
Shehrnaz Kermani	Women's precision javelin open	—	27	41
Shehrnaz Kermani	Women's discus throw 3	7.43	—	27
Shehrnaz Kermani	Women's javelin 3	7.05	—	26
Shehrnaz Kermani	Women's shot put 3	3.31	—	27

== Swimming ==
Murlikant Petkar became the first Indian Paralympic medalist when he won a gold medal in swimming. Hailing from Maharashtra, he was part of the Indian Army. He was injured in the 1965 India-Pakistan War when he was hit by multiple bullets. He started swimming as an exercise to improve mobility in the injured leg muscles. He set a new World Record when he won the gold medal in the freestyle 3 event. He was awarded the Padma Shri, India's third highest civilian honor for his achievement.

Athlete	Event	Heat		Final	
Athlete	Event	Result	Rank	Result	Rank
Murlikant Petkar	Men's 50 m freestyle 3	—		37.33	1st place, gold medalist(s)

== Table tennis ==
Athlete/Team	Event	Group Stage			Quarterfinals	Semifinals	Final / BM	
Athlete/Team	Event	Opposition Result	Opposition Result	Rank	Opposition Result	Opposition Result	Opposition Result	Rank
India	Men's teams 3	West Germany; L 0–3	United States; L 0–3	3	Did not advance			

== Weightlifting ==
Athlete	Event	Result	Rank
Makandi	Men's featherweight	75	6
