= India at the 1996 Summer Paralympics =

- IPC code: IND
- NPC: Paralympic Committee of India
- Website: Paralympic India

in Atlanta August 16, 1996 – August 25, 1996
- Competitors: 9 in 3 sports
- Medals: Gold 0 Silver 0 Bronze 0 Total 0

Summer Paralympics appearances (overview)
- 1968; 1972; 1976–1980; 1984; 1988; 1992; 1996; 2000; 2004; 2008; 2012; 2016; 2020; 2024

India competed at the 1996 Summer Paralympics in Atlanta from 16 to 25 August 1996. The nation made its official debut at the 1968 Summer Paralympics and has appeared in every edition of the Summer Paralympics since 1984. This was India's sixth appearance at the Summer Paralympics. India sent a contingent consisting of nine athletes for the Games and did not win any medal.

== Background ==
The Paralympic Committee of India was formed in 1994, five years after the International Paralympic Committee was established in 1989. The nation made its Paralympics debut in 1968 and have appeared in every edition of the Summer Paralympic Games since 1984. This edition of the Games marked the nation's sixth appearance at the Summer Paralympics.

India had won five medals across the previous Paralympic Games including one gold, two silver and bronze medals each. The Indian contingent for the Games consisted of nine people.

== Competitors ==
The Indian contingent for the 1996 Games consisted of nine athletes - all men, who competed across three sports.

Sport	Men	Women	Total
Athletics	7	0	7
Powerlifting	1	0	1
Shooting	1	0	1
Total	9	0	9

== Athletics ==
Track

Athlete	Event	Heat		Final	
Athlete	Event	Result	Rank	Result	Rank
Santosh Kudalkar	Men's 100 m T45/46	12.61	6	Did not advance	
Santosh Kudalkar	Men's 200 m T45/46	DNS		Did not advance	

Field

Athlete	Event	Result	Rank
Harry Prabhu	Men's discus throw F52	15.00	6
Harry Prabhu	Men's javelin throw F52	11.00	9
Harry Prabhu	Men's shot put F52	4.54	10
Mangat Singh	Men's discus throw F46	34.18	8
Mangat Singh	Men's shot put F46	9.95	9
Nayamathulla Khan	Men's javelin throw F46	39.36	7
Nayamathulla Khan	Men's shot put F46	9.13	10
Ramesh H.	Men's long jump T45/46	4.90	10
Santosh Kudalkar	Men's long jump T45/46	5.61	8
Sohan Brar	Men's javelin throw F46	37.82	8
Sohan Brar	Men's triple jump F45/46	10.80	5
Yadvendra Vashishta	Men's discus throw F46	39.84	5
Yadvendra Vashishta	Men's shot put F46	13.18	5

== Powerlifting ==
Athlete	Event	Result	Rank
Vijay Munishwar	Men's 82.5 kg	140.0	16

== Shooting ==
Athlete	Event	Qualification		Final		Rank
Athlete	Event	Score	Rank	Score	Total	Rank
Naresh Sharma	Mixed sport pistol SH1	511	20	Did not advance		
Naresh Sharma	Mixed free pistol SH1	498	27	Did not advance		
Naresh Sharma	Men's air pistol SH1	527	33	Did not advance		

== See also ==
- India at the Paralympics
- India at the 1996 Summer Olympics
