= Wang Dai Chen =

Chinese Paralympic athlete

Medal record

Men's para-athletics

Representing China

Paralympic Games
Silver medal – second place	2000 Sydney	Javelin throw F46
Bronze medal – third place	2004 Athens	Javelin throw F44/46

Wang Dai Chen is a paralympic athlete from China competing mainly in category F46 javelin events.

He competed in the javelin at both the 2000 and 2004 Summer Paralympics winning a silver in 2000 and a bronze in 2004. He was also a member of the unsuccessful Chinese T46 relay in the 2000 games.
