= Rajinder Singh Rahelu =

Indian Paralympic powerlifter

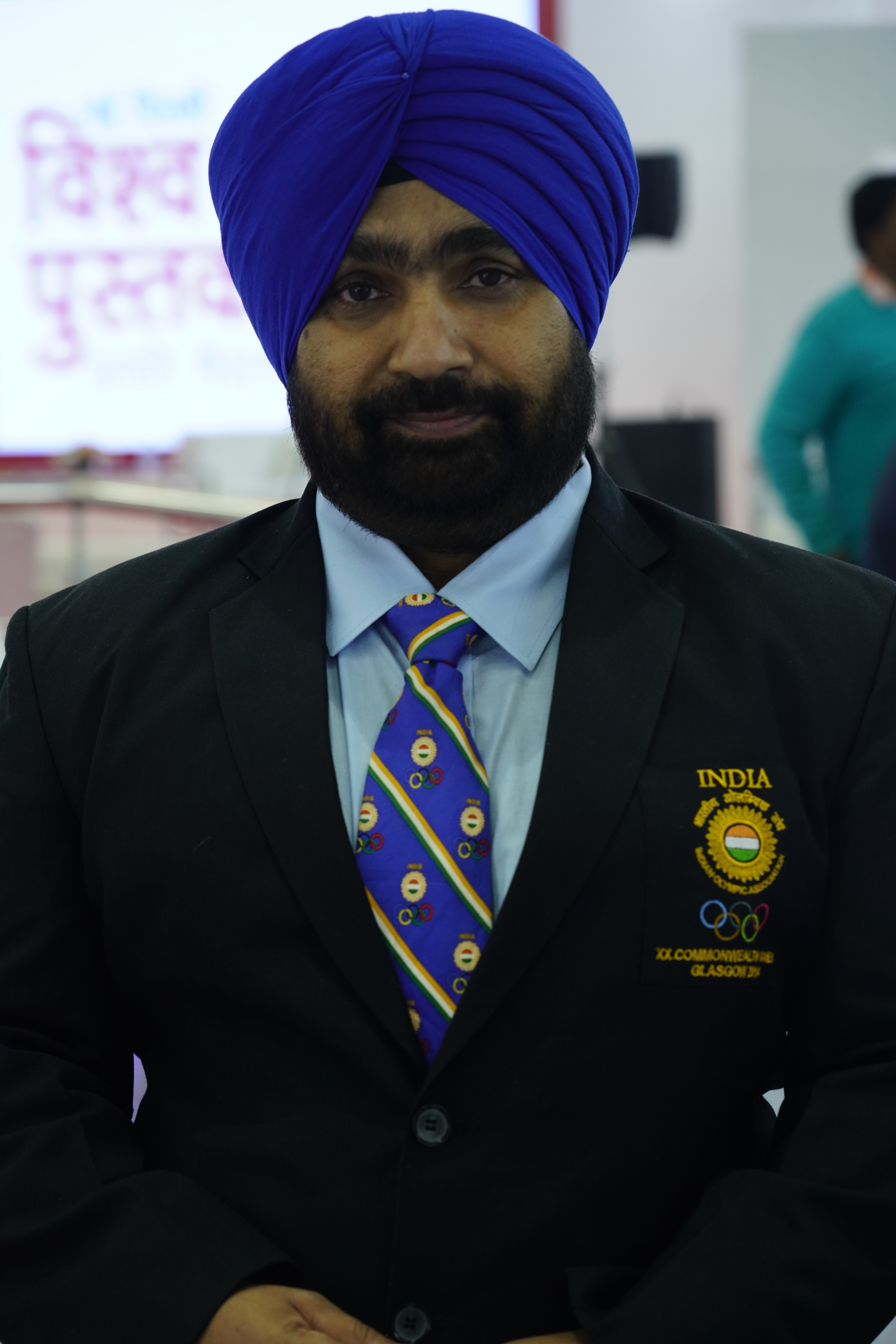
- Rajinder Singh Rahelu at New Delhi World Book Fair 2019

Personal information
- Nationality: Indian
- Born: 22 July 1973 (age 53) Mehsampur, Jalandhar district
- Height: 1.50 m (4 ft 11 in)

Sport
- Country: India
- Sport: Paralympic powerlifting
- Coached by: Vijay B Munishwar (national coach)
Medal record
Powerlifting
Paralympic Games
Bronze medal – third place	2004 Athens	Men's 56 kg
IWAS World Games
Silver medal – second place	2007 Taipei	Men's 56 kg
Asian Bench Press Championship
Gold medal – first place	2002 New Delhi	Men's 56 kg
Commonwealth Games
Silver medal – second place	2014 Glasgow	Men's Heavyweight (from 72.1 kg)

Rajinder Singh Rahelu (born 22 July 1973) is an Indian Paralympic powerlifter. He won a bronze medal at the 2004 Summer Paralympics in the 56 kg category. He represented India at the 2008 Summer Paralympics in Beijing, finishing fifth in the final standings. Arjuna Award recipient, Rahelu, represented India at the 2012 Summer Paralympics in London, United Kingdom; he failed in all his three attempts at 175 kilograms (386 lb).

== Personal life ==
Rahelu was born on 22 July 1973 in Mehsampur village, Jalandhar district, Punjab, in a poor Kashyap rajput family. He is the youngest of five siblings, with two older brothers and two older sisters. His father, Rattan Singh, worked as a bandmaster, and his mother Gurdial Kaur was a maid. Rahelu has infantile paralysis. He contracted polio when he was eight months old. He is married to Jaswinder Kaur and has two daughters named Ridhima and Ravneet.

== Powerlifting ==
After finishing higher secondary education, Rahelu chose not to continue his education further. He decided to pursue powerlifting following encouragement from his friend Surinder Singh Rana, who himself is a powerlifter. Captain Piara Singh VSM(Vashisht Seva Medalist) was his coach in 1996. He lifted 70 kg on his first bench press attempt and within six months he was able to lift 115 kg. He won his first ever title in powerlifting in 1997 at the Punjab Open Meet. In August 1998, he won National Powerlifting Championship held at Chhindwada in Madhya Pradesh.

Rahelu competed in the 56 kg category at the 2004 Summer Paralympics in Athens, Greece. He finished fourth in the final standings after lifting a total weight of 157.5 kg. However, this position was later upgraded to a third-place after Syrian lifter Youseff Younes Cheikh, bronze medallist of the event, was disqualified due to doping. In doing so, he won the first ever medal for India in the powerlifting event of the Paralympics. In 2006, he was conferred by the President of India the Arjuna Award, India's second highest sporting award.

Rahelu was one of the two Indian competitors at the 2008 Summer Paralympics. He participated in the powerlifting event. He managed to lift a total load of 170 kg putting him at position fifth, behind Polish Mariusz Tomczyk, out of thirteen contenders in the final. Rahelu won silver in 2014 Commonwealth Games, with a total lift of 185 kg.

== Occupation ==
Working as Weightlifting (Para Powerlifting) Coach in Sports Authority of India at NSWC Gandhinagar, Gujarat.

== See also ==
- India at the Paralympics
