= Athletics at the 2004 Summer Paralympics – Men's javelin throw F42–46 =

Men's javelin throw events for amputee athletes were held at the 2004 Summer Paralympics in the Athens Olympic Stadium. Events were held in two disability classes.

== F42 ==
Men's Javelin F42 at the XII Paralympic Games
- Venue: Athens Olympic Stadium
- Dates: 25 September 2004
- Competitors: 12 from 12 nations
- Winning distance: 49.57

Medalists
1st place, gold medalist(s)		Jakob Mathiasen	Denmark
2nd place, silver medalist(s)		Fanie Lombaard	South Africa
3rd place, bronze medalist(s)		Vahab Saalabi	Iran

The F42 event was won by Jakob Mathiasen, representing Denmark.

25 Sept. 2004, 18:45

Rank	Athlete	Result	Notes
1st place, gold medalist(s)	Jakob Mathiasen (DEN)	49.57	
2nd place, silver medalist(s)	Fanie Lombaard (RSA)	47.02	
3rd place, bronze medalist(s)	Vahab Saalabi (IRI)	46.91	
4	Jos van der Donk (NED)	46.83	
5	Satian Thongdee (THA)	44.90	
6	Runar Steinstad (NOR)	44.58	
7	Pompilio Falconi (PER)	43.03	
8	Leszek Cmikiewicz (POL)	42.82	
9	Dechko Ovcharov (BUL)	40.56	
10	Chen Chia Hsiang (TPE)	39.21	
11	Bahruz Bashirov (AZE)	33.29	
12	Muhammad Ashfaq (PAK)	29.26	

== F44/46 ==
Men's Javelin F44/46 at the XII Paralympic Games
- Venue: Athens Olympic Stadium
- Dates: 21 September 2004
- Competitors: 13 from 9 nations
- Winning distance: 62.15

Medalists
1st place, gold medalist(s)		Devendra Jhajharia	India
2nd place, silver medalist(s)		Gao Ming Jie	China
3rd place, bronze medalist(s)		Wang Dai Chen	China

The F44/46 event was won by Devendra Jhajharia, representing India.

21 Sept. 2004, 11:00

Rank	Athlete	Result	Points	Notes
1st place, gold medalist(s)	Devendra Jhajharia (IND)	62.15	1117	WR
2nd place, silver medalist(s)	Gao Ming Jie (CHN)	55.57	1033	
3rd place, bronze medalist(s)	Wang Dai Chen (CHN)	55.54	998	
4	Evgeny Gudkov (RUS)	53.34	992	
5	Ha Si Lao (CHN)	52.29	972	
6	Tsai Tsung Wei (TPE)	47.62	885	
7	Urs Kolly (SUI)	46.87	871	
8	Jeffrey Skiba (USA)	46.44	863	
9	Muhammad Adeel (PAK)	38.16	709	
10	Angkarn Chanaboon (THA)	39.08	702	
11	Mose Faatamala (SAM)	37.37	671	
12	Munawar Hussain (PAK)	34.93	627	
	Noor Alam (PAK)	DNS		
