= Devendra Jhajharia =

Indian Paralympic javelin thrower

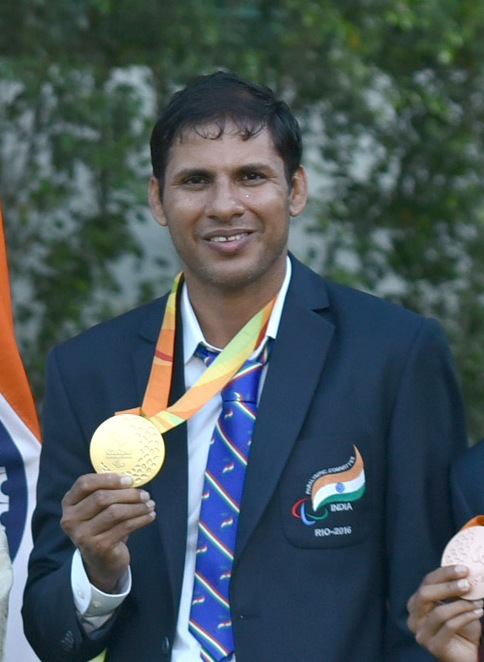
- Devendra Jhajharia with his gold medal from the 2016 Summer Paralympics

Personal information
- Nationality: Indian
- Born: 10 June 1981 (age 45)

President of Paralympic Committee of India
- Incumbent
- Assumed office 9 March 2024
- Preceded by: Deepa Malik

Sport
- Country: India
- Sport: Para-Athletics
- Event: F46 Javelin
- Coached by: Sunil Tanwar

Achievements and titles
- Paralympic finals: 2004 2016 2020
Medal record
Track and field (athletics)
Representing India
Paralympic Games
Gold medal – first place	2004 Athens	Javelin - F44/46
Gold medal – first place	2016 Rio	Javelin - F46
Silver medal – second place	2020 Tokyo	Javelin - F46
IPC World Championships
Gold medal – first place	2013 Lyon	Javelin - F46
Silver medal – second place	2015 Doha	Javelin - F46
Asian Para Games
Silver medal – second place	2014 Incheon	Javelin - F46

Devendra Jhajharia (born 10 June 1981) is an Indian Paralympic javelin thrower. Born in Jat family in Sadulpur Churu.He is the first Indian Paralympics player to win two gold medals at the Paralympics.He unsuccessfully contested 2024 Indian General Election from Churu on BJP ticket.He won his first gold in the javelin throw at the 2004 Summer Paralympics in Athens, becoming the second gold medalist at the Paralympics for his country. At the 2016 Summer Paralympics in Rio de Janeiro, he won a second gold medal in the same event, bettering his previous record. Devendra is currently being supported by the Olympic Gold Quest. He becomes India's most decorated Paralympic player by winning his third medal, a silver at the 2020 Summer Paralympics at Tokyo. In 2024, he was elected president of the Paralympic Committee of India.

== Early life and background ==
Jhajharia was born on 10 June 1981, in Churu, Rajasthan. At the age of eight, climbing a tree he touched a live electric cable. He received medical attention but the doctors were forced to amputate his left hand. In 1997 he was spotted by Dronacharya Awardee coach R. D. Singh while competing at a school sports day, and from that point was coached by Singh. He gave credit to his personal coach R. D. Singh for 2004 Paralympic Gold Medal, saying: "He gives me a lot of advice and helps me during training."

He has been coached by Sunil Tanwar since 2015.

== Career ==
In 2002 Jhajharia won the gold medal in the 8th FESPIC Games in South Korea. In 2004 Jhajharia qualified for his first Summer Paralaympic Games representing India at Athens. At the games he set a new world record with a distance of 62.15m eclipsing the old one of 59.77m. The throw gave him the gold medal and he became only the second gold medalist at the Paralympics for his country (India's first gold medal came from Murlikant Petkar).

Further athletic success came in 2013 at the IPC Athletics World Championships in Lyon, France when he took the gold medal in the F46 javelin throw. He followed this with a silver medal at the 2014 Asian Para Games at Incheon in South Korea. At the 2015 IPC Athletics World Championships in Doha, despite throwing 59.06, Jhajharia could only finish in second place, claiming silver behind China's Guo Chunliang, who threw a championship record distance.

In 2016, he won a gold medal at the 2016 IPC Athletics Asia-Oceania Championship in Dubai. At the 2016 Summer Paralympics in Rio de Janeiro, he won the gold medal in the men's javelin throw F46 event, bettering his own 2004 record with a world-record throw of 63.97 metres.

On 30 August 2021, Jhajharia won silver medal in the men's javelin throw F46 event at Tokyo Paralympics 2020 along with Sundar Singh Gurjar (bronze medal at the same event).

== Personal life ==
A former Indian Railways employee, Jhajharia is currently employed with the Rajasthan Forest Department. His wife, Manju, is a former nationally ranked kabaddi player; the couple has two children, Jiya and Kavyan.

Devendra Jhajharia was brought up by Jevani Devi and Ram Singh Jhajharia

== Political career ==
On 2 March 2024, he was announced as the BJP candidate for the 2024 Indian general election from the Churu constituency in Rajasthan.

== Awards and recognition ==
- Major Dhyan Chand Khel Ratna (2017)
- FICCI Para-Sportsperson of the Year (2014)
- Padma Shri (2012; first Paralympian to be so honoured).
- Arjuna Award (2004)
- Padma Bhushan (2022)

== See also ==
- India at the Paralympics
