= Joginder Singh Bedi =

Indian Paralympic athlete

Olympic medal record

Representing India

Paralympic Games
Silver medal – second place	1984 Stoke Mandeville	Shot Put L6
Bronze medal – third place	1984 Stoke Mandeville	Javelin - F46
Bronze medal – third place	1984 Stoke Mandeville	Discus Throw L6

Joginder Singh Bedi was an Indian track and field Paralympic athlete. Singh Bedi competed at the 1984 Summer Paralympics, where he won three medals.

== See also ==
- India at the Paralympics
