= Narender Ranbir =

Indian Paralympic javelin thrower

Personal information
- Nationality: Indian
- Born: 10 July 1989 (age 36) Sonipat, Haryana

Sport
- Country: India
- Sport: Athletics
- Disability class: F44
- Event: Javelin

Achievements and titles
- Paralympic finals: 2016
Medal record
Track and field (athletics)
Representing India
Asian Para Games
Silver medal – second place	2014 Incheon	Javelin – F44

Narender Ranbir (born 10 July 1989) is an Indian Paralympic javelin thrower competing in F44 events. He is supported by the GoSports Foundation through the Para Champions Programme ahead of his quest to win a medal for India at the 2016 Paralympics in Rio de Janeiro, Brazil.

== Early life and background ==
Narender has had a deformity in his left leg by birth. Initially a runner, Narender had to give up athletics due to chronic back problems. His passion for sport saw him quickly switch to javelin throw.

== Career ==
After taking to javelin throw, Narender has been consistently performing at the highest level. He finished sixth at the London Paralympics in 2012, after which he narrowly missed out on a medal at the World Championships in Lyon, finishing fourth. Narender's best performance came at the Asian Para Games in 2014 at Incheon, where he clinched the silver medal.

Narender trains without a coach at the Sports Authority of India in Sonipat. He is one of India's top medal prospects at the 2016 Summer Paralympic Games in Rio de Janeiro.

== Achievements ==
Paralympics

Year	Venue	Event	Score	Result
2012	London	javelin	49.50	6th Rank
2016	Rio de Janeiro	javelin	53.79	6th Rank

World Championships

Year	Venue	Event	Score	Result
2017	London	javelin	51.07	8th Rank
