= Jagseer Singh =

Indian paralympic long jumper

Personal information
- Full name: Jagseer Singh
- Home town: Hanumangarh
- Height: 5 ft 11 in (180 cm)
- Weight: 78 Kg (as of November 2019)

Sport
- Country: India
- Event(s): Long jump, Triple jump, High jump & 400 metres
Medal record
Representing India
Men's athletics
Asian Para Games
Gold medal – first place	2010 Guangzhou	Triple Jump F46
Silver medal – second place	2010 Guangzhou	Long Jump F46

Jagseer Singh Mahar is an Indian Para athlete competing in Men's 100m, 200m, 400m and long jump events in the F46 category. In 2010, he was the first and only Indian player to win a gold medal in the first Asian Para Games held in Guangzhou China. Honoured with Arjuna Award in 2010. Honoured with Maharana Pratap Award in 2009.

== Awards and recognition ==
- Arjuna Award (2010)
- Maharana Pratap Award (2009)
