= Murlikant Petkar =

Indian swimmer (born 1944)

Murlikant Rajaram Petkar
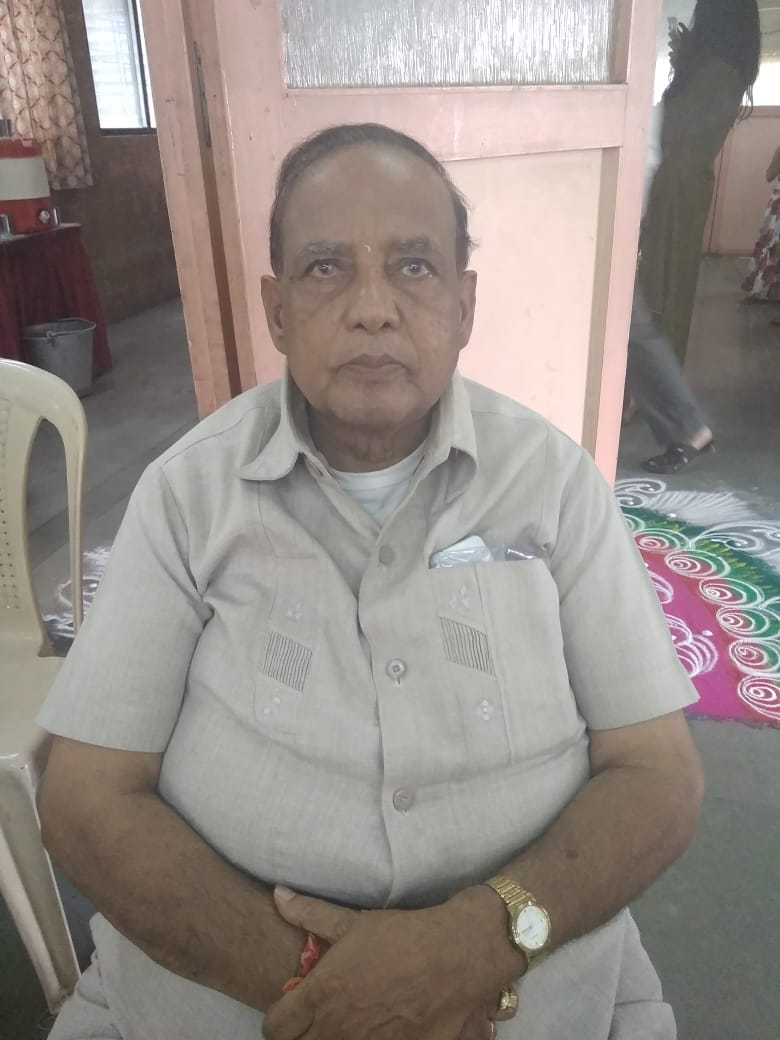
- Petkar in 2019

Personal information
- Nickname: Chandu Champion
- Nationality: Indian
- Born: 1 November 1944 (age 81) Sangli, Maharashtra
- Military career
- Allegiance: India
- Branch: Indian Army
- Rank: Craftsman
- Unit: EME
- Awards: Padma Shri

Sport
- Country: India
- Sport: Swimming, javelin, slalom, table tennis, shot put, Boxing
- Disability: Yes
Medal record
Freestyle swimming
Representing India
Paralympic Games
Gold medal – first place	1972 Heidelberg	50 m freestyle swimming

Murlikant Petkar (born 1 November 1944) is India's first Paralympic gold medalist. He won an individual gold medal in the 1972 Summer Paralympics, in Heidelberg, Germany. He set a world record in the 50 m freestyle swimming event, at 37.33 seconds. In the same games he participated in javelin throw, precision javelin throw, and wheelchair slalom. He was a finalist in all three events. In 2018, he was awarded with the Padma Shri. He was also awarded the Arjuna Award for Lifetime Achievement in 2024, which was presented to him in January 2025.

== Biography ==
Petkar was born in Peth Islampur village of Sangli district of Maharashtra state. Growing up, Petkar had a deep passion for sports, particularly boxing, a sport that demands not just physical strength but also mental fortitude. His talent in the ring quickly became evident, and it wasn’t long before the Indian Army took notice. He was private or jawan of the craftsman rank in the Corps of Electronics and Mechanical Engineers (EME) in the Indian Army. He was disabled during the 1965 war against Pakistan, sustaining severe bullet wounds. He faced 9 bullets, 8 of which were removed, but one had lodged deeply in his spine, disabling him from under the waist. He was admitted to INHS Asvini (an Indian Navy Hospital) in Bombay. Before his disability, Petkar was originally a boxer at EME, Secunderabad. After he got disabled, he switched to swimming and other sports. He participated in table tennis at the 1968 Summer Paralympics and cleared the first round. He won four medals in swimming.

He was later employed by TELCO in Pune. On the 20th March 2018, Murlikant was awarded the Padma Shri Award for his sports achievement.

== In media ==
=== Biographical film ===
Chandu Champion is a Hindi-language sports drama film based on the life of Murlikant Petkar, directed by Kabir Khan and enacted by Kartik Aaryan.

== See also ==
- India at the Paralympics
- India at the 1968 Summer Paralympics
- India at the 1972 Summer Paralympics
