= Girisha Nagarajegowda =

Indian Paralympic athlete

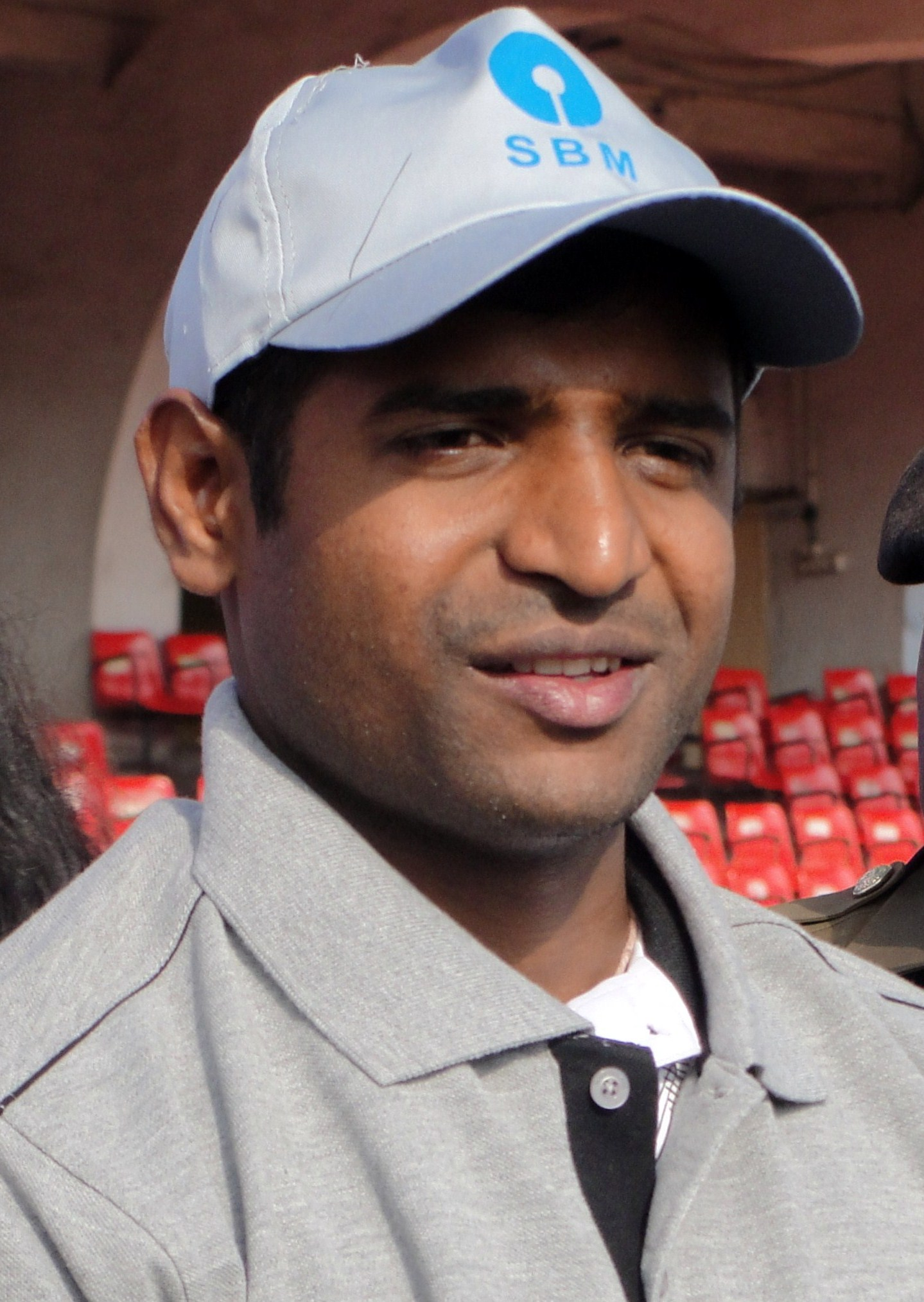
- Girisha Nagarajegowda

Personal information
- Full name: Girisha Hosanagara Nagarajegowda
- Born: 26 January 1988 (age 38)

Sport
- Country: India
- Sport: Athletics
- Event: High jump – F42

Achievements and titles
- Paralympic finals: 2012 Summer Paralympics: High Jump (F42) – Silver
Medal record
Representing India
Men's athletics
Paralympic Games
Silver medal – second place	2012 London	High Jump F42
Junior World Championships
Bronze medal – third place	2006 Ireland	High jump
Open Championships
Gold medal – first place	2012 Kuwait	High jump
Silver medal – second place	2012 Malaysia	High jump
Gold medal – first place	2019 Dubai IWAS	High jump

Girisha Hosanagara Nagarajegowda (born 26 January 1988), also known as Girish N. Gowda is paralympic high jumper from India. He was born with a disability in the left leg. He represented India in the 2012 Summer Paralympic games held in London in the men's high jump F-42 category and won the silver medal in the finals with a jump of 1.74 meters using scissors technique. He became the first Indian to win a medal at that event.^{[1]} and the 8th Indian to win a medal at the Paralympics.^{[2]}

Nagarajegowda is supported by Sports Academy of India For Differently abled, a Bangalore He is also supported by "Karnataka Sports Association for Physically Handicapped" in Bangalore. He had taken part in the three-week training camp at Basildon Sporting Village sponsored by the Government of India before the games.^{[2]}

== Early success ==
Girisha's first taste of success was when he won a prize at the State-level sports meet in Dharwad when he competed with normal sportsmen. He then won a bronze medal at the Mysore University sports meet. He then won the gold medal at the national high jump championship. His first achievement at the international level came when he won a bronze at the Junior World Championships for the disabled in Ireland in 2006. This was followed by gold medals in athletic meets in Kuwait and Malaysia.

== Sponsorship ==
He was made the brand ambassador of nutrition company Herbalife International.

He was made the brand ambassador of election commission of karnataka.2017 and 2019

== Awards ==
- 2012 "Rajyotsava Award" by the Government of Karnataka
- 2013 Padma Shri, India's fourth highest civilian award from the Government of India.
- 2014 Arjuna Award by President of India
- 2013"Ekalavya" Award by government of Karnataka in 2013
- 2012"Best sports man State Award" by Disabled welfare department Govt of Karnataka
