= Bhimrao Kesarkar =

Indian Paralympic athlete

Olympic medal record

Representing India

Paralympic Games
Silver medal – second place	1984 Stoke Mandeville	Javelin - F46

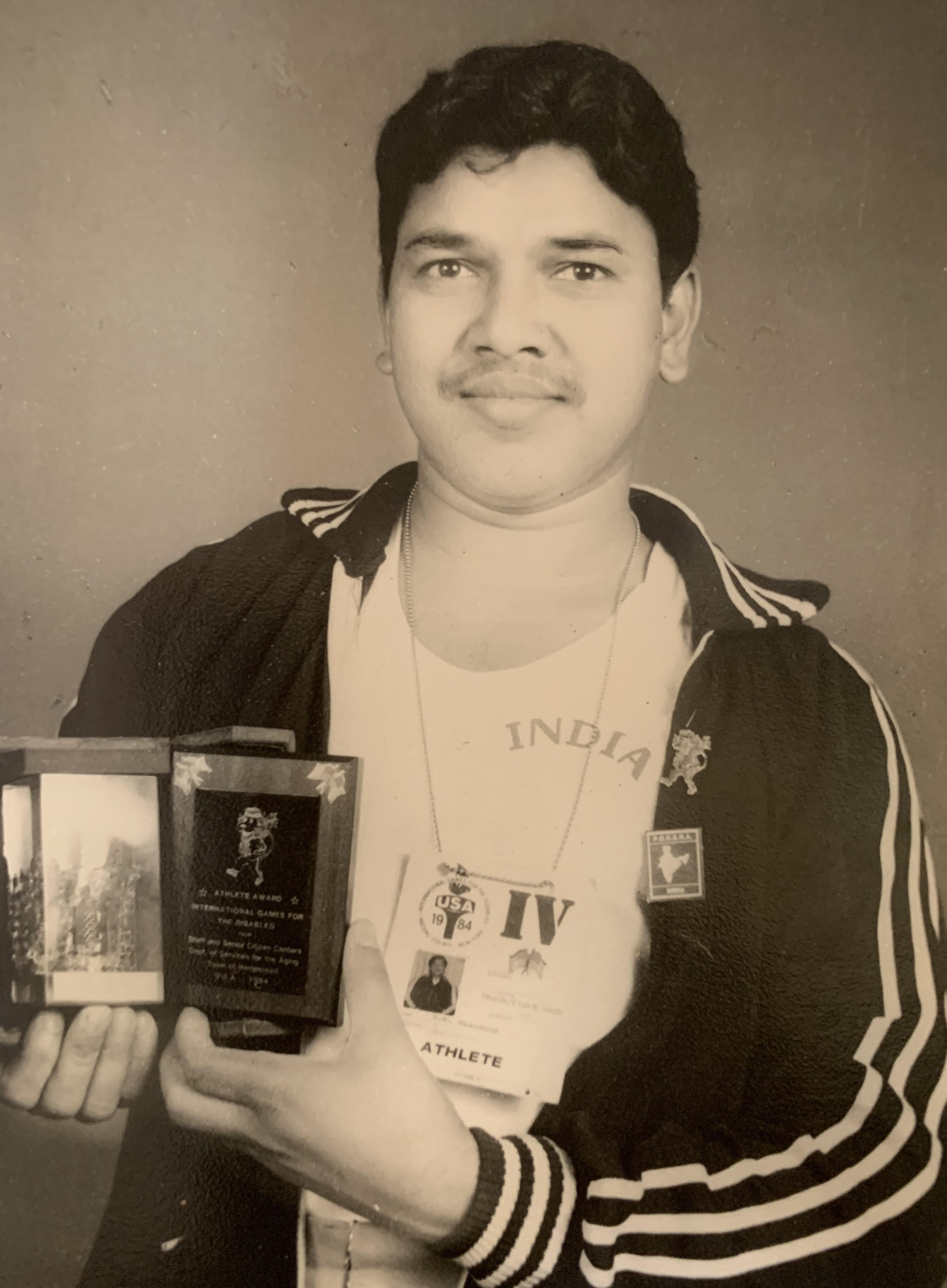
Bhimrao Kesarkar 1984 Summer Paralympics Representing India

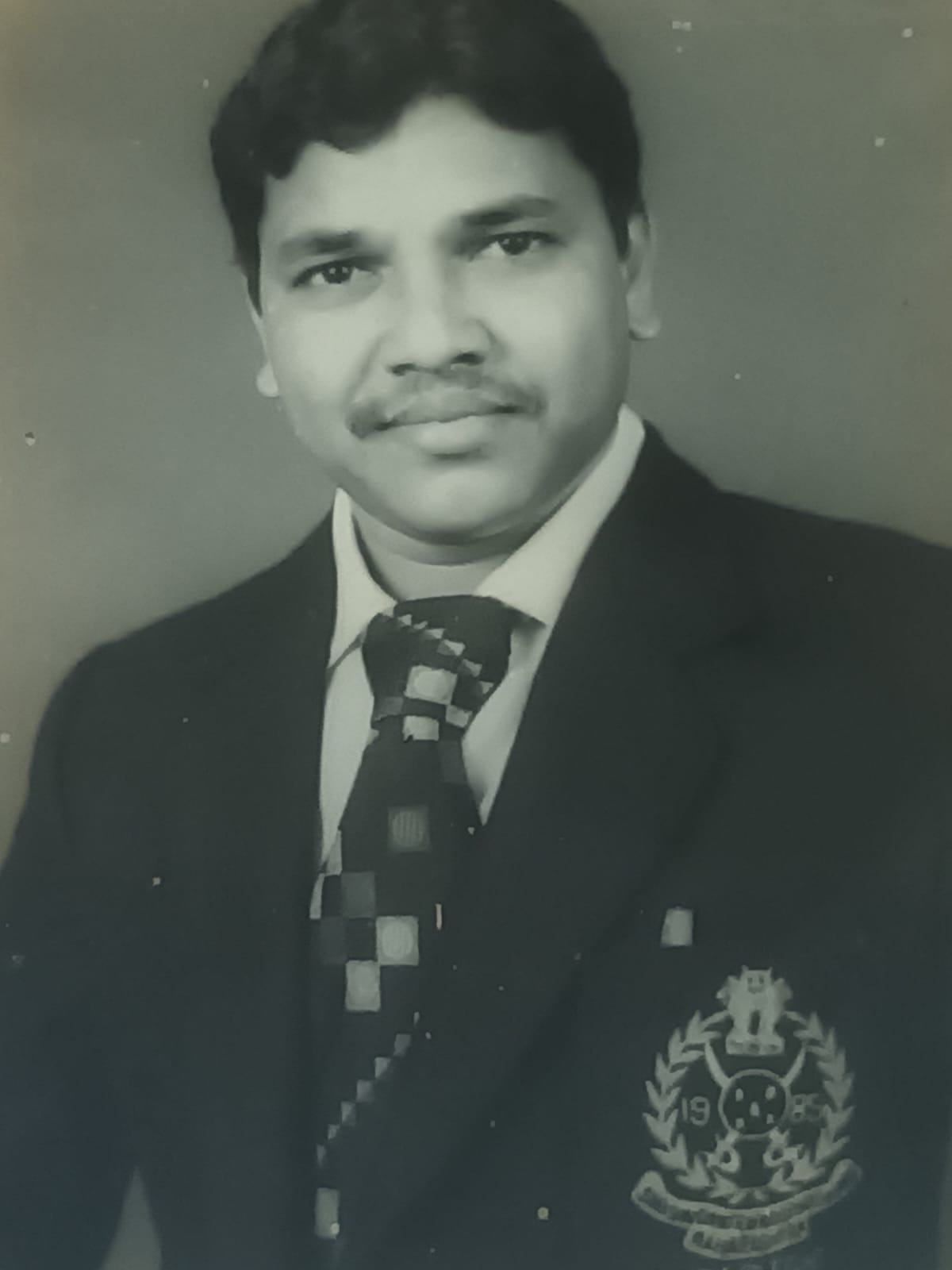
Shree Shiv Chhatrapati Award (Jersey)

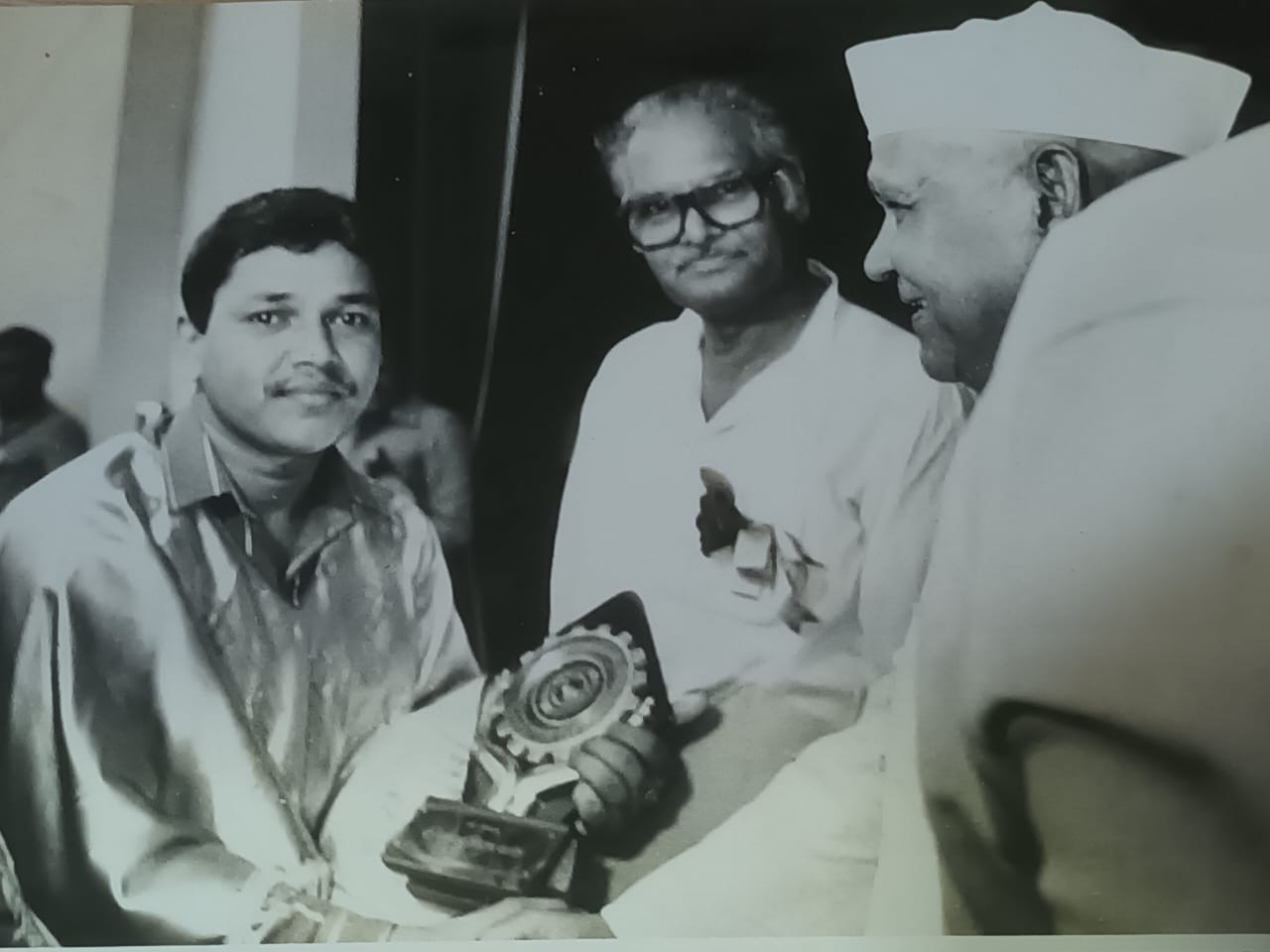
Receiving Gunwant Kamgar Award from Shankar Dayal Sharma (Former Governor of Maharashtra, Former President and Vice President of India)

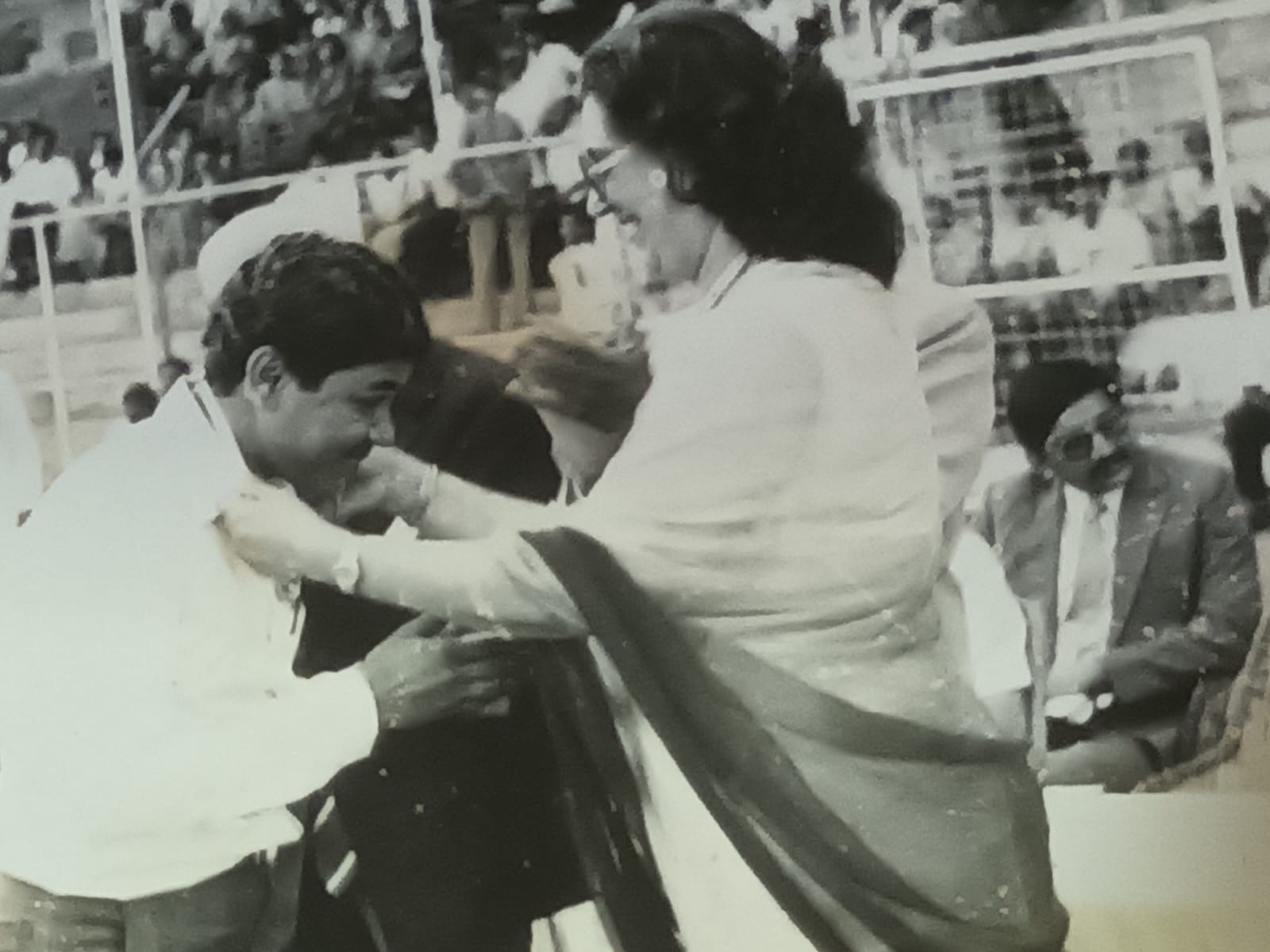
Felicitated by Bilkees Latif (Wife of Governor of Maharashtra)

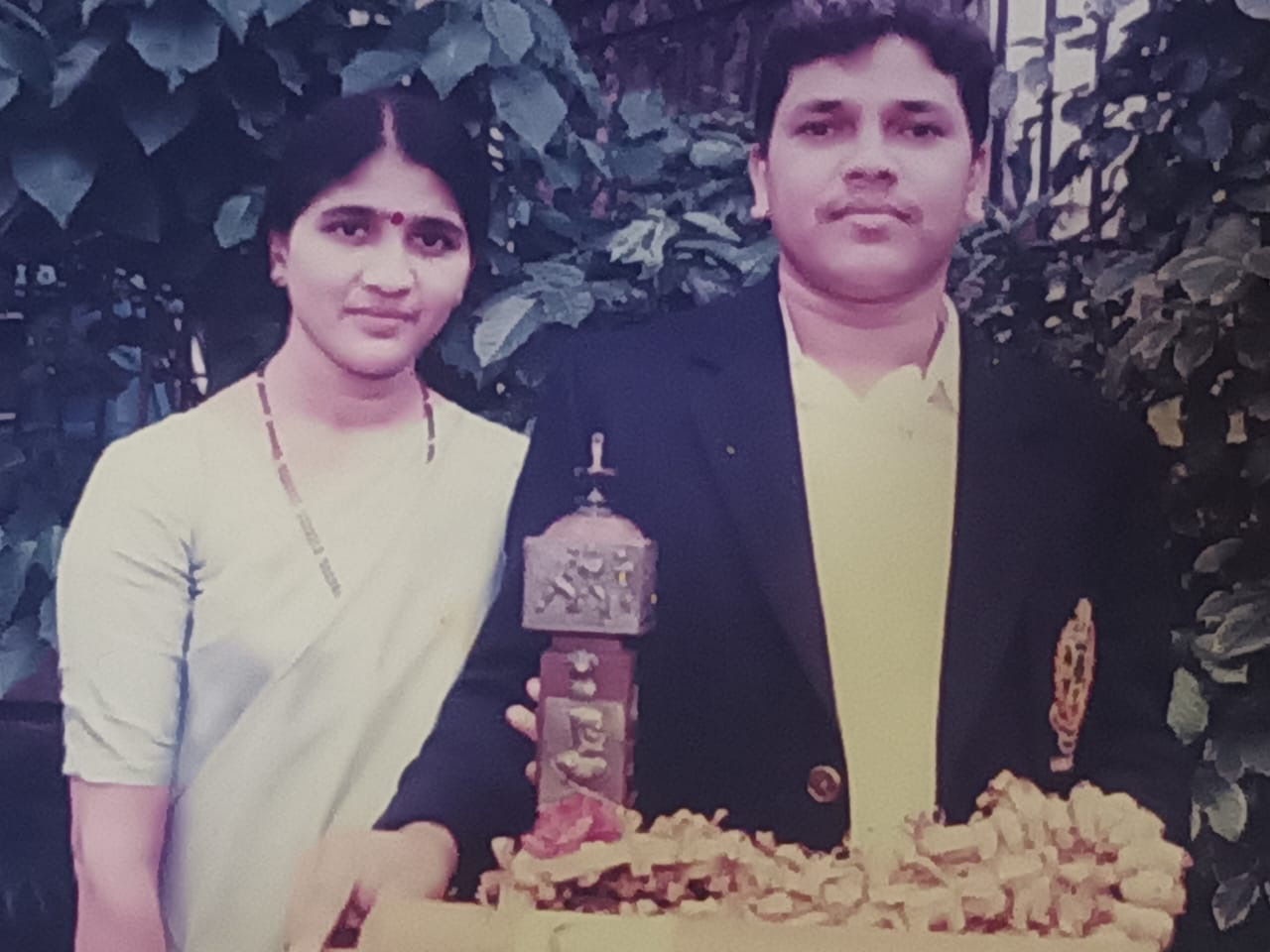
Shree Shiv Chhatrapati Award

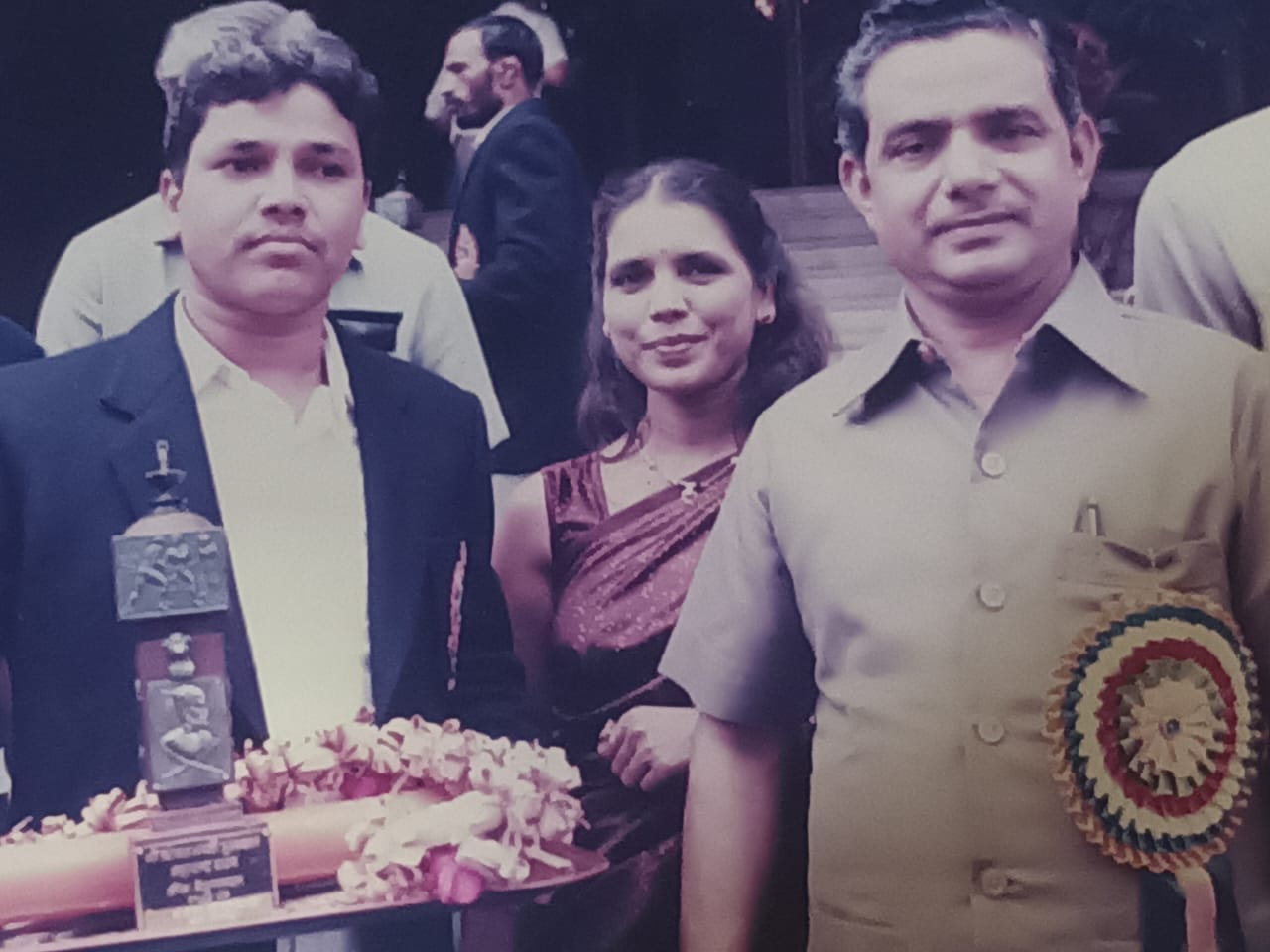
Nakul Patil - Minister of State for Sports in Maharashtra

Bhimrao Kesarkar is an Indian Paralympic athlete who won the silver medal in the men's javelin L6 at the 1984 Summer Paralympics, where India won 4 medals and finished 37th out of 54 participating nations.
