= Malathi Krishnamurthy Holla =

Indian paralympic athlete (born 1968)

Malathi Holla
Personal information
- Born: 6 July 1958 (age 67) Kota, Karnataka, India

Sport
- Sport: Paralympic racing

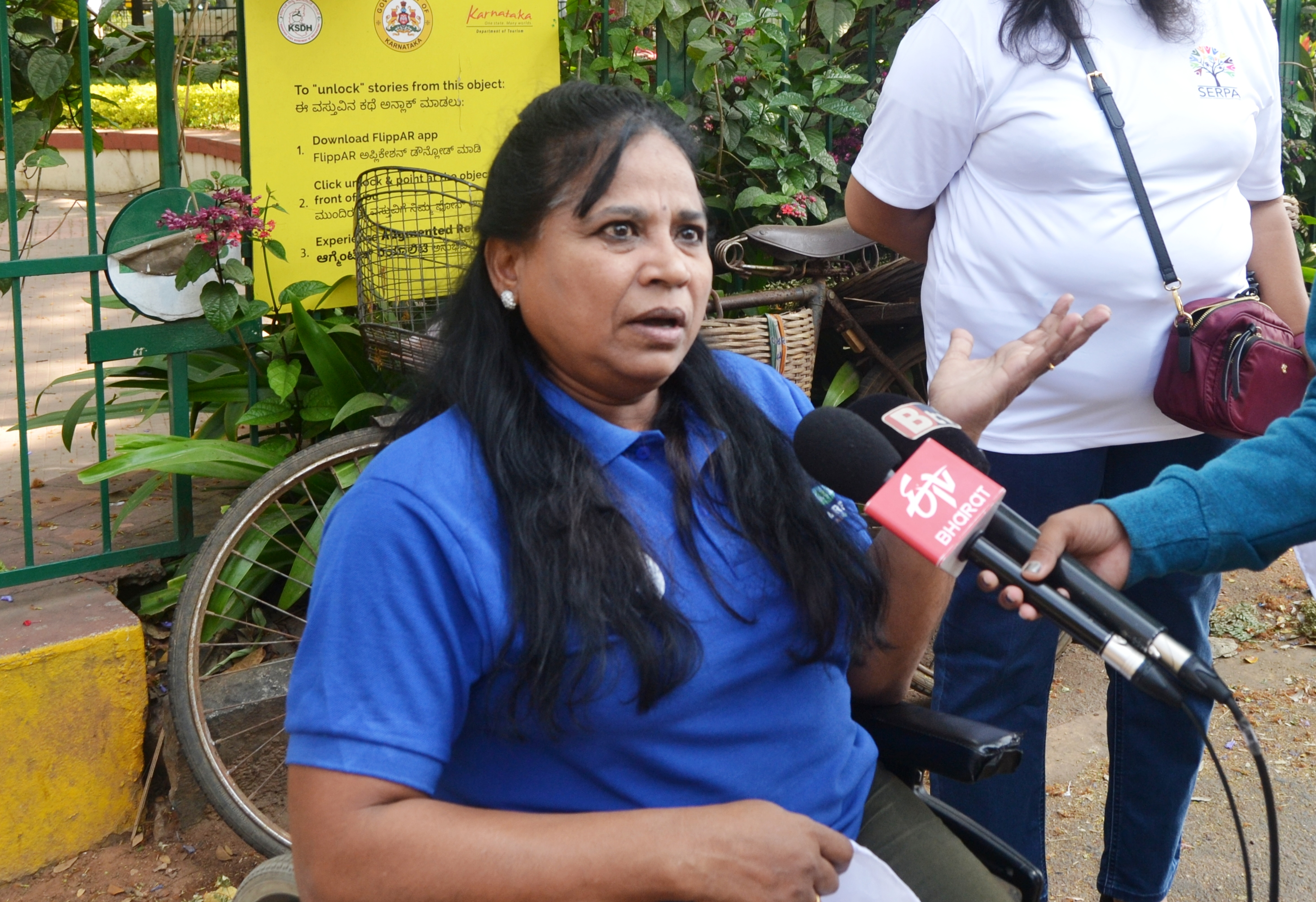
Arjuna awardee Malathi Krishnamurthy Holla, at an awareness march near Cubbon Park, Bangalore on 1 March 2020.

Malathi Krishnamurthy Holla is an international para athlete from India. She was awarded Arjuna award and Padma Shri for her achievements.

She was born on 6 July 1958 in kota, Karnataka, India. Her father Krishnamurthy Holla ran a small hotel, while her mother Padmavathi Holla took care of their four children. Malathi was paralyzed by polio when she was one year old. Electric shock treatment for more than two years improved her upper body strength.

Having won over 397 gold medals, 27 Silver medals and 5 bronze medals. Malathi was conferred the prestigious Arjuna and Padma Shri awards. She represented India in the Paralympics held in South Korea, Barcelona, Athens and Beijing; the Asian Games held in Beijing, Bangkok, South Korea and Kuala Lumpur; World Masters held in Denmark and Australia, Commonwealth Games in Australia and Open Championships in Belgium, Kuala Lumpur and England.

Malathi has so far undergone 34 surgeries. She works as a Manager in Syndicate Bank and shelters 54 children with various disabilities at Mathru Foundation – a charitable trust formed along with her friends. She focuses mainly on polio victims from rural areas, whose parents cannot afford to send their child to school or provide medical treatment.

She launched her first authorized biography, A Different Spirit on 8 July 2009.

"When I was young, I wanted to be first among my friends who used to run to the backyard to pick the fallen mangoes. I wanted to fly like a bird fearlessly from one place to another. But as I grew up I realised that you need legs to run and wings to fly. I was hurt, but I didn’t give up. I knew, one day, I would run…” says Malathi in the book.

"Thus I took up sports and decided to do something different in life. Yes, we are different and so even our lives should be a shining example of that difference", she adds.
