= Farman Basha =

Indian Paralympic powerlifter (born 1974)

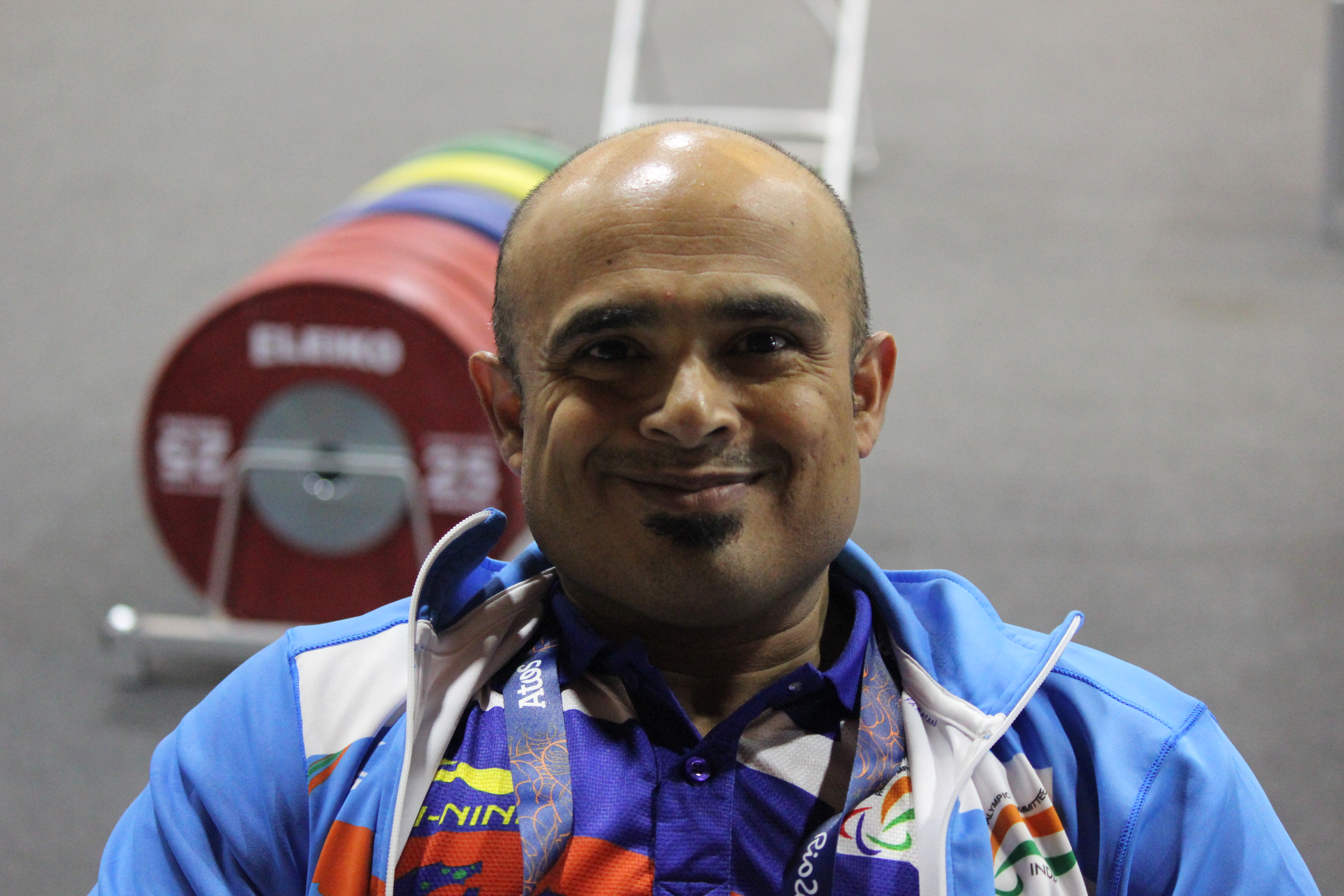
- Farman Basha in Rio for the 2016 Paralympic Games

Personal information
- Born: 25 February 1974 (age 52) Bangalore, Karnataka
- Height: 1.55 m (5 ft 1 in)

Sport
- Country: India
- Sport: Paralympic powerlifting
- Weight class: 48–49 kg (106–108 lb)
- Coached by: Vijay B Munishwar (national coach)
Medal record
Men's Powerlifting
Representing India
Asian Para Games
| Silver medal – second place | 2010 Guangzhou | −48 kg |
| Silver medal – second place | 2018 Jakarta | −49 kg |
| Bronze medal – third place | 2014 Incheon | −49 kg |

Farman Basha (born 25 March 1974) is an Indian powerlifter. Basha represented India at the 2012 Summer Paralympics in London, United Kingdom. He won a bronze medal at the 2010 Asian Para Games in Guangzhou, China. However, this was later upgraded to a silver medal after Iranian Mustafa Radhi was disqualified due to doping.

== Personal life ==
Basha was born on 25 March 1974 in Bangalore, Karnataka, to a middle-class family. He holds a diploma in electronics and television engineering. He is married to Antonita Farman, a general category athlete. Basha is afflicted with poliomyelitis, which he contracted when he was one year old. Due to this permanent physical impairment, he is unable to ambulate and uses calipers and a wheelchair.

== Powerlifting ==
Unaware of Paralympic sports, Basha used to compete in bodybuilding contentions. He started powerlifting after his neighbour introduced him to sport for persons with physical disabilities. The first event he participated in was the 1997 National Wheelchair Games, where he won a silver medal. This achievement encouraged him to "pursue the sport with even greater vigour".

In 1998, Basha won a gold medal and set a new national record in the South Zone selection trials for the 1999 FESPIC Games (Far East and South Pacific Games for the Disabled), held in Bangkok, where he finished seventh overall. He won a gold medal in an event for non-disabled competitors in 2006. This feat "left the Powerlifting Federation of India [Indian Powerlifting Federation] so upset that" the Federation barred disabled athletes from competing in their events. He represented India at the 2006 Commonwealth Games in Melbourne, Australia. He lifted 156.8 kilograms (346 lb) and finished at tenth spot.

He was awarded with the Arjuna Award in 2008. In 2010, he received the Ekalavya Award – Chief Minister's award for an outstanding sportsperson (for 2008) from the Governor of Karnataka Hansraj Bhardwaj at a ceremony in the Raj Bhavan.

He is sponsored by a company with ₹5,000–5,500 per month and his wife, Antonita, contributes for rest of the expenditures.

Basha appeared in 4 Paralympic events and finished 10th in 2004, 4th in 2008, 5th in 2012 and 4th in 2016 Paralympics in his category.

He competed at the 2018 Commonwealth Games where he came 5th in the lightweight event.
