= Paralympic Committee of India =

National Paralympic Committee of India

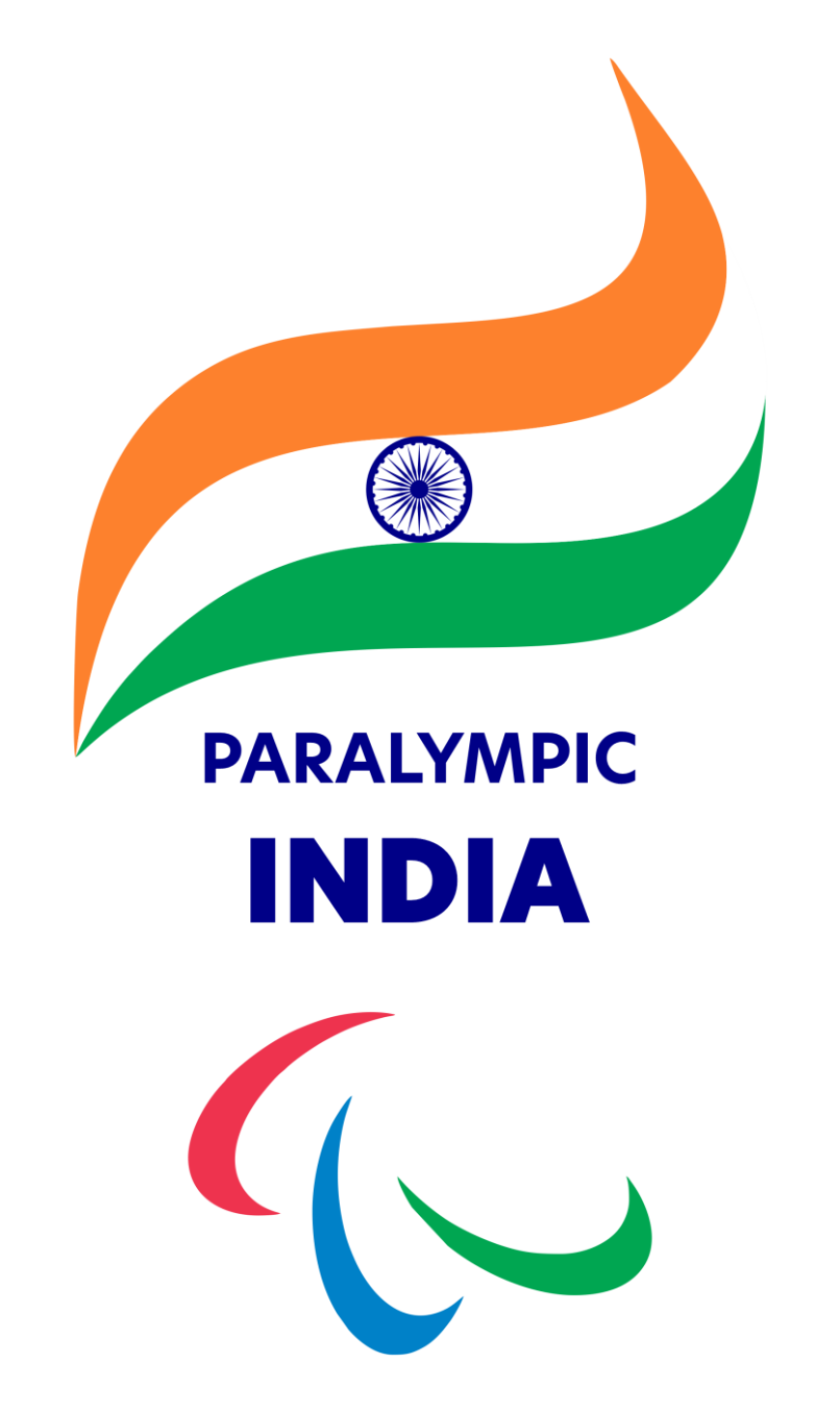

National Paralympic Committee
- Country: India
- Code: IND
- Created: 1992
- Recognized: 1992
- Continental association: APC
- Headquarters: New Delhi, India
- President: Devendra Jhajharia
- Secretary General: Jayawant Gundu Hamanawar
- Website: www.paralympicindia.com

The Paralympic Committee of India is the body responsible for selecting athletes to represent India at the Paralympic Games and other international athletic meets and for managing the Indian teams at the events.

The organisation was founded in 1992 as the Physically Handicapped Sports Federation of India but was renamed to be inclusive.

== History ==
In 1992, M. Mahadeva along with others started an organization at national level for the promotion and development of sports for physically challenged and disabled people, Physically Handicapped Sports Federation of India. It was registered in 1994 with the registrar of co-operative societies, Bangalore, Karnataka. Its first President was Rathan Singh. The objectives of this organization were to promote sports for the disabled in India. Its aims included: identifying disabled athletes throughout India, imparting necessary training to them and preparing them to take part in State, National and International Sports meets.

The organization affiliated itself to the International Paralympic Committee, as well as the International Wheelchair and Amputee Sports Federation; the FESPIC Federation, covering countries in the Far East and South Pacific regions; and the Asian Paralympic Committee.

The Paralympic Committee of India was given public authority status by the RTI Act of 2005.

== Administration ==
=== IOA executive council ===
Following is the PCI executive committee for the 2024–2028 term.

Designation	Name	National sports federation / State olympic committee
President	Devendra Jhajharia	Athletics Federation of India
Vice-presidents	Chandrasekar Rajan	Tamil Nadu Paralympic Sports Association
Vice-presidents	Satya Parkash Sangwan	NA
Secretary General	Jayawant Gundu Hamanawar	NA
Treasurer	Sunil Pradhan	Badminton Association of India
Joint Secretaries	Lalit	Himachal Pradesh Parasports Association
Joint Secretaries	Diwakara Thimmegowda	NA
Executive Council Members	Dr Sutapa Chakrabarty	NA
Executive Council Members	Bhati Chandulal Tarachandji	Athletics Federation of India
Executive Council Members	Sandeep Kumar	Bihar Para Sports Association
Executive Council Members	Shaminder Singh Dhillon	NA
Executive Council Members	Singarapu Babu	Paralympic Volley Ball Federation of India

=== Aims and objectives ===
- To promote and contribute to the development of sport opportunities and competitions, from the start to elite level.
- To develop opportunities for athletes with a severe disability in sport at all levels and in all structures.
- To promote the self-governance of each Paralympic sport federation as an integral part of the national sport movement, whilst at all times safeguarding and preserving its own identity.
- To ensure the spirit of fair play prevails, the health risk of the athletes is managed and fundamental ethical principles are upheld.

== State Paralympic Associations ==
1. Andaman and Nicobar Para Sports Association
2. Para Sports Association Andhra Pradesh
3. Paralympic Association of Arunachal Pradesh
4. Assam Para Sports Association
5. Bengal Para Sports Association
6. Bihar Para Sports Association
7. Chandigarh Sports Association for Differently Abled
8. Para Sports Association of Chhattisgarh
9. Dadar and Nagar Haveli Para Sports Association
10. Daman and Diu Para Sports Association
11. Divyang Para Sports Association of Delhi
12. Goa Para Sports Association
13. Para Sports of Gujarat
14. Paralympic Committee of Haryana
15. Himachal Pradesh Para Sports Association
16. Jammu and Kashmir Para Sports Association
17. Jharkhand Para Sports Association
18. Karnataka Sports Association for Physically Handicapped
19. Sports Association for Differently Abled Kerala
20. Para Sports Association of Madhya Pradesh
21. Paralympic Sports Association Maharashtra
22. Handicapped Sports Union of Manipur
23. Paralympic Association of Meghalaya
24. Paralympic Association of Mizoram
25. Paralympic Association of Nagaland
26. Para Sports Association of Odisha
27. Punjab Para Sports Association
28. Para Sports Association of Pondicherry
29. Divyang Para Sports Association of Rajasthan
30. Paralympic Association of Sikkim
31. Tamil Nadu Paralympic Sports Association
32. Para Sports Association of Telangana
33. Tripura Para Sports Association
34. Uttar Pradesh Para Sports Association
35. Paralympic Association of Uttarakhand

== See also ==
- India at the Paralympics
- India at the Asian Para Games
- Indian Olympic Association
- Sport in India
