= Athletics at the 2024 Summer Paralympics – Women's 100 metres =

Athletics – Women's 100 metres at the XVII Paralympic Games
- Venue: Stade de France
- Dates: 30 August – 7 September 2024
- No. of events: 13

100 metres at the 2024 Summer Paralympics
Men · T11 · T12 · T13 · T34 · T35 · T36 · T37 · T38 · T44 · T47 · T51 · T52 · T53 · T54 · T63 · T64
Women · T11 · T12 · T13 · T34 · T35 · T36 · T37 · T38 · T47 · T53 · T54 · T63 · T64

The Women's 100m athletics events for the 2024 Summer Paralympics took place at the Stade de France from 30 August to 7 September, 2024. A total of 13 events were contested over this distance.

== Schedule ==
R	Round 1	½	Semifinals	F	Final

Date	Fri 30		Sat 31		Sun 1		Mon 2		Tue 3		Wed 4		Thu 5		Fri 6		Sat 7	
Event	M	E	M	E	M	E	M	E	M	E	M	E	M	E	M	E	M	E
T11 100m							R	½		F								
T12 100m												R	½	F				
T13 100m									R	F								
T34 100m						F												
T35 100m	R	F																
T36 100m											R	F						
T37 100m												R	F					
T38 100m			R	F														
T47 100m									R	F								
T53 100m											R	F						
T54 100m											R	F						
T63 100m																	R	F
T64 100m														R		F		

== Medal summary ==
The following is a summary of the medals awarded across all 100 metres events.

Classification	Gold		Silver		Bronze	
T11	Jerusa Geber dos Santos; Brazil; Guide: Gabriel dos Santos Garcia	11.83	Liu Cuiqing; China; Guide: Chen Shengming	12.04	Lorena Spoladore; Brazil; Guide: Renato Costa Oliveira	12.14
T12	Omara Durand; Cuba; Guide: Yuniol Kindelan Vargas	11.81 SB	Oksana Boturchuk; Ukraine; Guide: Mykyta Barbanov	12.17 SB	Katrin Mueller-Rottgardt; Germany; Guide: Noel-Phillippe Fiener	12.26 SB
T13	Lamiya Valiyeva; Azerbaijan	11.76 WR	Rayane Soares da Silva; Brazil	11.78 AR	Orla Comerford; Ireland	11.94
T34	Hannah Cockroft; Great Britain	16.80	Kare Adenegan; Great Britain	17.99	Lan Hanyu; China	18.45
T35	Zhou Xia; China	13.58	Guo Qianqian; China	13.74	Preethi Pal; India	14.21
T36	Shi Yiting; China	13.39 PR	Danielle Aitchison; Australia	13.43	Veronica Hipolito; Brazil	14.24
T37	Wen Xiaoyan; China	12.52 PR	Taylor Swanson; United States	13.19	Jaleen Roberts; United States	13.29 SB
T38	Karen Palomeque; Colombia	12.26 WR	Lida-Maria Manthopoulou; Greece	12.49	Darian Faisury Jiménez; Colombia	12.53
T47	Kiara Rodriguez; Ecuador	12.04	Brittni Mason; United States	12.10	Anna Grimaldi; New Zealand	12.20 AR
T53	Samantha Kinghorn; Great Britain	15.64 PR	Catherine Debrunner; Switzerland	15.77	Gao Fang; China	16.16 SB
T54	Léa Bayekula; Belgium	15.50 PR	Tatyana McFadden; United States	15.67	Amanda Kotaja; Finland	15.77
T63	Martina Caironi; Italy	14.16 SB	Karisma Evi Tiarani; Indonesia	14.26 WR	Monica Graziana Contrafatto; Italy	14.60
T63	Martina Caironi; Italy	14.16 SB	Karisma Evi Tiarani; Indonesia	14.26 WR	Ndidikama Okoh; Great Britain	14.59 PB
T64	Fleur Jong; Netherlands	12.54	Kimberly Alkemade; Netherlands	12.70	Marlene van Gansewinkel; Netherlands	12.72

== Results ==
The following were the results of the finals only of each of the Women's 100 metres events in each of the classifications. Further details of each event, including where appropriate heats and semi finals results, are available on that event's dedicated page.

=== T11 ===
The T11 category is for athletes with a visual impairment. A T11 athlete may be entirely without sight, or be able to perceive light, but have no ability to see the shape of a hand at any distance. T11 athletes commonly run with guides.

The final in this classification took place on 3 September 2024, at 20:00:

Rank	Lane	Name	Nationality	Time	Notes
1st place, gold medalist(s)	3	Jerusa Geber dos Santos; Guide: Gabriela dos Santos Garcia	Brazil	11.83	
2nd place, silver medalist(s)	7	Liu Cuiqing; Guide: Chen Shengming	China	12.04	
3rd place, bronze medalist(s)	5	Lorena Spoladore; Guide: Renator Costa Oliveira	Brazil	12.14	
4	1	Linda Pérez López; Guide: Alvaro Cassiani Herrera	Venezuela	12.27	
				Wind: -0.1 m/s	

=== T12 ===
The T12 category is for athletes with visual impairment. Athletes in this category will generally have some residual sight, the ability to recognise the shape of a hand at a distance of 2 metres and the ability to perceive clearly will be no more than 2/60. T12 athletes commonly run with guides.

The final in this classification took place on 5 September 2024, at 19:16:

Rank	Lane	Name	Nationality	Time	Notes
1st place, gold medalist(s)	5	Omara Durand; Guide: Yuniol Kindelan Vargas	Cuba	11.81	SB
2nd place, silver medalist(s)	1	Oksana Boturchuk; Guide: Mykyta Barbanov	Ukraine	12.17	SB
3rd place, bronze medalist(s)	3	Katrin Mueller-Rottgardt; Guide: Noel-Phillippe Fiener	Germany	12.26	SB
4	7	Simran Sharma; Guide: Abhay Singh	India	12.31	
				Wind: 0.0 m/s	

=== T13 ===
The T13 category is for athletes with a moderate visual impairment. Athletes in this category have a variety of visual impairments, but can typically recognize contours from a distance of 2 to 6 metres. Athletes in this category do not typically require a guide.

The final in this classification took place on 3 September 2024, at 20:08:

Rank	Lane	Name	Nationality	Time	Notes
1st place, gold medalist(s)	6	Lamiya Valiyeva	Azerbaijan	11.76	WR
2nd place, silver medalist(s)	5	Rayane Soares da Silva	Brazil	11.78	AR
3rd place, bronze medalist(s)	4	Orla Comerford	Ireland	11.94	
4	8	Kym Crosby	United States	12.40	
5	3	Adiaratou Iglesias Forneiro	Spain	12.51	
6	9	Gabriela Mendonca Ferriera	Brazil	12.67	
7	2	Erin Kerkhoff	United States	12.75	
8	7	Bianca Borgella	Canada	25.11	
				Wind: +0.2 m/s	

=== T34 ===
The T34 category is for wheelchair athletes with cerebral palsy. Athletes in this category have minimal limitations or control problems in their arms and trunk while pushing a wheelchair.

The final in this classification took place on 1 September 2024, at 20:33:

Rank	Lane	Name	Nationality	Time	Notes
1st place, gold medalist(s)	6	Hannah Cockroft	Great Britain	16.80	
2nd place, silver medalist(s)	7	Karé Adenegan	Great Britain	17.99	
3rd place, bronze medalist(s)	5	Lan Hanyu	China	18.45	AR
4	8	Eva Houston	United States	18.65	
5	4	Fabienne André	Great Britain	18.86	
6	3	Moe Onodera	Japan	18.94	SB
7	2	Haruka Kitaura	Japan	19.81	
8	9	Ayano Yoshida	Japan	20.07	
				Wind: +0.2 m/s	

=== T35 ===
The T35 category is for ambulant athletes with cerebral palsy. The typical T35 athlete may need assistive devices for walking. The athlete may have sufficient function to run but demonstrates poor balance.

The final in this classification took place on 30 August 2024:

Rank	Lane	Name	Nationality	Time	Notes
1st place, gold medalist(s)	5	Zhou Xia	China	13.58	SB
2nd place, silver medalist(s)	6	Guo Qianqian	China	13.74	PB
3rd place, bronze medalist(s)	7	Preethi Pal	India	14.21	PB
4	4	Fatimah Suwaed	Iraq	14.82	
5	3	Ingrid Renecka	Poland	15.29	PB
6	8	Jagoda Kibil	Poland	15.54	
7	9	Nienke Timmer	Netherlands	15.69	
8	2	Isabelle Foerder	Germany	16.36	
9	1	Saltanat Abilkhassymkyzy	Kazakhstan	16.52	
				Wind: -0.1 m/s	

=== T36 ===
The T36 category is for ambulant athletes with cerebral palsy. These athletes do not have the capacity to remain still and they show involuntary movements with all four limbs affected. They usually walk without assistive devices.

The final in this classification took place on 4 September 2024, at 19:04:

Rank	Lane	Name	Nationality	Time	Notes
1st place, gold medalist(s)	6	Yiting Shi	China	13.39	WR
2nd place, silver medalist(s)	5	Danielle Aitchinson	New Zealand	13.43	
3rd place, bronze medalist(s)	7	Veronica Hipolito	Brazil	14.24	SB
4	9	Mali Lovell	Australia	14.45	PB
5	8	Araceli Rotela	Argentina	14.80 (.798)	
6	3	Cheyenne Bouthoorn	Netherlands	14.80 (.799)	
7	2	Jae Jeon	South Korea	14.95	
–	4	Samira Da Silva Brito	Brazil	DQ	R17.8
				Wind: -0.6 m/s	

=== T37 ===
The T37 category is for ambulant athletes with cerebral palsy. These athletes have movement and coordination problems on one half of their body. They have good ability in their dominant side of their body (ie hemiplegia).

The final in this classification took place on 5 September 2024, at 11:01:

Rank	Lane	Name	Nationality	Time	Notes
1st place, gold medalist(s)	6	Wen Xiaoyan	China	12.52	PR
2nd place, silver medalist(s)	7	Taylor Swanson	United States	13.19	
3rd place, bronze medalist(s)	5	Jaleen Roberts	United States	13.29	SB
4	4	Jiang Fenfen	China	13.34	
5	8	Mandy François-Elie	France	13.67	
6	2	Nataliia Kobzar	Ukraine	13.70	
7	9	Viktoriia Slanova	Neutral Paralympic Athletes	13.82	
8	3	Sheryl James	South Africa	13.90	
				Wind: -0.2 m/s	

=== T38 ===
The T38 category is for ambulant athletes with cerebral palsy. T38 athletes have the mildest form of impairment caused by cerebral palsy, often in only one limb, and not affecting the ability to run, walk or jump freely, although impairing performance. T38 athletes may suffer minor co-ordination difficulties.

The final in this classification took place on 31 August 2024, at 20:06:

Rank	Lane	Name	Nationality	Time	Notes
1st place, gold medalist(s)	4	Karen Palomeque	Colombia	12.26	WR
2nd place, silver medalist(s)	5	Lida-Maria Manthopoulou	Greece	12.49	PB
3rd place, bronze medalist(s)	6	Darian Faisury Jiménez	Colombia	12.53	SB
4	9	Rhiannon Clarke	Australia	12.72	AR
5	8	Luca Ekler	Hungary	12.78	
6	7	Sophie Hahn	Great Britain	12.88	
7	2	Margarita Goncharova	Neutral Paralympic Athletes	12.96	
8	3	Maddie Down	Great Britain	13.02	
				Wind: +0.8 m/s	

=== T47 ===
The T47 category is for athletes who have a single below elbow or wrist amputation or similar disability, with normal function in both legs.

The final in this classification took place on 3 September 2024:

Rank	Lane	Class	Name	Nationality	Time	Notes
1st place, gold medalist(s)	7	T46	Kiara Rodriguez	Ecuador	12.04	SB
2nd place, silver medalist(s)	5	T46	Brittni Mason	United States	12.10	SB
3rd place, bronze medalist(s)	8	T47	Anna Grimaldi	New Zealand	12.20	AR
4	6	T47	Sheriauna Haase	Canada	12.53	
5	3	T46	Saska Solokov	Serbia	12.56	
6	9	T46	Marie Ngoussou Ngouyi	France	12.58	
7	2	T47	Maria Clara Augusto da Silva	Brazil	12.63	SB
DNF	4	T47	Lisbeli Marina Vera Andrade	Brazil	DNF	
					Wind: 0.0 m/s	

=== T53 ===
The T53 category is for wheelchair athletes with normal use of arms and hands, no or limited trunk function, and no leg function.

The final in this classification took place on 4 September 2024, at 20:36:

Rank	Lane	Name	Nationality	Time	Notes
1st place, gold medalist(s)	7	Samantha Kinghorn	Great Britain	15.64	PR
2nd place, silver medalist(s)	5	Catherine Debrunner	Switzerland	15.77	
3rd place, bronze medalist(s)	2	Gao Fang	China	16.16	SB
4	4	Zhou Hongzhuan	China	16.49	SB
5	8	Jessica Cooper Lewis	Bermuda	16.83	
6	6	Hamide Doğangün	Turkey	16.88	
7	3	Chelsea Stein	United States	18.30	
				Wind: +1.2 m/s	

=== T54 ===
The T54 category is for wheelchair athletes with no leg function, but near full arm function and reasonable to normal trunk function. Typically this may be caused by a lower spinal cord injury or spinal cord birth defect.

The final in this classification took place on 4 September 2024, at 20:43:

Rank	Lane	Name	Nationality	Time	Notes
1st place, gold medalist(s)	7	Léa Bayekula	Belgium	15.50	PR
2nd place, silver medalist(s)	4	Tatyana McFadden	United States	15.67	
3rd place, bronze medalist(s)	6	Amanda Kotaja	Finland	15.77	
4	5	Noemi Alphonse	Mauritius	16.11	
5	2	Zhou Zhaoqian	China	16.44	
6	8	Hannah Dederick	United States	16.50	
7	9	Alexandra Helbling	Switzerland	16.91	
8	3	Marie Desirella Brandy Perrine	Mauritius	16.98	
				Wind: -0.1 m/s	

=== T63 ===
The T63 Category is for athletes with single through knee or above knee limb deficiency competing with a prosthesis.

The final in this classification took place on 7 September 2024, at 21:22:

Rank	Lane	Class	Name	Nationality	Time	Notes
1st place, gold medalist(s)	4	T63	Martina Caironi	Italy	14.16	SB
2nd place, silver medalist(s)	5	T42	Karisma Evi Tiarani	Indonesia	14.26	WR
3rd place, bronze medalist(s)	7	T63	Monica Graziana Contrafatto	Italy	14.60	
3rd place, bronze medalist(s)	3	T42	Ndidikama Okoh	Great Britain	14.59	PB
5	8	T63	Elena Kratter	Switzerland	15.00	PB
6	2	T63	Lindi Marcusen	United States	15.11	
7	9	T63	Noelle Lambert	United States	15.39	
—	6	T63	Ambra Sabatini	Italy	DNF	YC R7.2
					Wind: +0.8 m/s	

Notes: Monica Graziana Contrafatto awarded a joint bronze medal due to interference, after Ambra Sabatini fell and caused Contrafatto to trip.

=== T64 ===
The T64 Category is for athletes with unilateral below knee limb deficiency competing with a prosthesis.

The final in this classification took place on 6 September 2024, at 19:14:

Rank	Lane	Name	Nationality	Time	Notes
1st place, gold medalist(s)	7	Fleur Jong	Netherlands	12.54	
2nd place, silver medalist(s)	6	Kimberly Alkemade	Netherlands	12.70	
3rd place, bronze medalist(s)	4	Marlene van Gansewinkel	Netherlands	12.72	
4	2	Sara Andres Barrio	Spain	13.03	
5	8	Abassia Rahmani	Switzerland	13.10	
6	5	Femita Ayanbeku	United States	13.15	
7	9	Marissa Papaconstantinou	Canada	13.25	
8	3	Irmgard Bensusan	Germany	13.31	
				Wind: -0.2 m/s	
