= Athletics at the 2024 Summer Paralympics – Women's 400 metres =

Athletics – Women's 400 metres at the XVII Paralympic Games
- Venue: Stade de France
- Dates: 30 August – 7 September 2024
- No. of events: 9

400 metres at the 2024 Summer Paralympics
Men · T11 · T12 · T13 · T20 · T36 · T37 · T38 · T47 · T52 · T53 · T54 · T62
Women · T11 · T12 · T13 · T20 · T37 · T38 · T47 · T53 · T54 ·

The Women's 400m athletics events for the 2024 Summer Paralympics took place at the Stade de France from 30 August to 7 September, 2024. A total of 9 events were contested over this distance.

== Schedule ==
R	Round 1	½	Semifinals	F	Final

Date	Fri 30		Sat 31		Sun 1		Mon 2		Tue 3		Wed 4		Thu 5		Fri 6		Sat 7	
Event	M	E	M	E	M	E	M	E	M	E	M	E	M	E	M	E	M	E
T11 400m	R	½		F														
T12 400m								R	F									
T13 400m														R			F	
T20 400m								R		F								
T37 400m								R		F								
T38 400m																R		F
T47 400m		R		F														
T53 400m													R	F				
T54 400m													R	F				

== Medal summary ==
The following is a summary of the medals awarded across all 400 metres events.

Classification	Gold		Silver		Bronze	
T11	Lahja Ishitile; Namibia; Guide: Sem Shimanda	56.20	Thalita Simplício; Brazil; Guide: Felipe Veloso da Silva	57.21	He Shanshan; China; Guide: You Junjie	58.25
T12	Omara Durand; Cuba; Guide: Yuniol Kindelan Vargas	53.59	Hajar Safarzadeh; Iran	55.39	Oksana Boturchuk; Ukraine; Guide: Mykyta Barabanov	55.67
T13	Rayane Soares da Silva; Brazil	53.55 WR	Lamiya Valiyeva; Azerbaijan	55.09	Carolina Duarte; Portugal	55.52
T20	Yuliia Shuliar; Ukraine	55.16 PB	Aysel Önder; Turkey	55.23	Deepthi Jeevanji; India	55.82
T37	Nataliia Kobzar; Ukraine	1:00.92 PB	Jiang Fenfen; China	1:01.88 SB	Viktoriia Slanova; Neutral Paralympic Athletes	1:03.61 PB
T38	Karen Palomeque; Colombia	58.67 WR	Luca Ekler; Hungary	59.35 AR	Lindy Ave; Germany	1:00.37 SB
T47	Fernanda Yara da Silva; Brazil	56.74	Lisbeli Vera Andrade; Venezuela	56.78	Maria Clara Augusto; Brazil	57.20
T53	Catherine Debrunner; Switzerland	51.60 PR	Samantha Kinghorn; Great Britain	53.45	Zhou Hongzhuan; China	55.09
T54	Léa Bayekula; Belgium	53.05	Manuela Schär; Switzerland	53.15	Zhou Zhaoqian; China	54.01

== Results ==
The following were the results of the finals only of each of the Women's 400 metres events in each of the classifications. Further details of each event, including where appropriate heats and semi finals results, are available on that event's dedicated page.

=== T11 ===
The T11 category is for athletes with a visual impairment. A T11 athlete may be entirely without sight, or be able to perceive light, but have no ability to see the shape of a hand at any distance. T11 athletes commonly run with guides.

The final in this classification took place on 31 August 2024, at 19:58:

Rank	Lane	Name	Nationality	Time	Notes
1st place, gold medalist(s)	3	Lahja Ishitile; Guide: Sem Shimanda	Namibia	56.20	PR
2nd place, silver medalist(s)	5	Thalita Simplício; Guide: Felipe Veloso da Silva	Brazil	57.21	SB
3rd place, bronze medalist(s)	7	He Shanshan; Guide: You Junjie	China	58.25	PB
4	1	Ionis Salcedo; Guide: Niver Rangel Palmera	Colombia	1:00.15	

=== T12 ===
The T12 category is for athletes with visual impairment. Athletes in this category will generally have some residual sight, the ability to recognise the shape of a hand at a distance of 2 metres and the ability to perceive clearly will be no more than 2/60. T12 athletes commonly run with guides.

The final in this classification took place on 3 September 2024, at 12:14:

Rank	Lane	Name	Nationality	Time	Notes
1st place, gold medalist(s)	5	Omara Durand; Guide: Yuniol Kindelan Vargas	Cuba	53.59	SB
2nd place, silver medalist(s)	3	Hajar Safarzadeh	Iran	55.39	AR
3rd place, bronze medalist(s)	7	Oksana Boturchuk; Guide: Mykyta Barabanov	Ukraine	55.67	SB
4	1	Alejandra Paola Pérez López; Guide: Markinzon Daniel Manzanilla Velasquez	Venezuela	56.64	

=== T13 ===
The T13 category is for athletes with a moderate visual impairment. Athletes in this category have a variety of visual impairments, but can typically recognize contours from a distance of 2 to 6 metres. Athletes in this category do not typically require a guide.

The final in this classification took place on 7 September 2024, at 10:22:

Rank	Lane	Name	Nationality	Time	Notes
1st place, gold medalist(s)	8	Rayane Soares da Silva	Brazil	53.55	WR
2nd place, silver medalist(s)	5	Lamiya Valiyeva	Azerbaijan	55.09	
3rd place, bronze medalist(s)	6	Carolina Duarte	Portugal	55.52	
4	3	Adiaratou Iglesias Forneiro	Spain	56.98	SB
5	7	Erin Kerkhoff	United States	57.19	
6	9	Nantenin Keita	France	57.43	
7	4	Mana Sasaki	Japan	58.35	SB
8	2	Mariia Ulianenko	Neutral Paralympic Athletes	58.96	

=== T20 ===
The T20 category is for athletes with intellectual impairment. T20 athletes have an IQ score of 75 or less.

The final in this classification took place on 3 September 2024, at 19:08:

Rank	Lane	Name	Nationality	Time	Notes
1st place, gold medalist(s)	6	Yuliia Shuliar	Ukraine	55.16	PB
2nd place, silver medalist(s)	8	Aysel Önder	Turkey	55.23	
3rd place, bronze medalist(s)	7	Deepthi Jeevanji	India	55.82	
4	5	Breanna Clark	United States	56.43	
5	9	Leonela Coromoto Vera Colina	Venezuela	57.18	
6	3	Lizanshela Angulo	Ecuador	57.90	
7	4	Antônia Keyla da Silva	Brazil	58.34	
8	2	Telaya Blacksmith	Australia	59.37	

=== T37 ===
The T37 category is for ambulant athletes with cerebral palsy. These athletes have movement and coordination problems on one half of their body. They have good ability in their dominant side of their body (ie hemiplegia).

The final in this classification took place on 3 September 2024, at 21:41:

Rank	Lane	Name	Nationality	Time	Notes
1st place, gold medalist(s)	8	Nataliia Kobzar	Ukraine	1:00.92	PB
2nd place, silver medalist(s)	6	Jiang Fenfen	China	1:01.88	SB
3rd place, bronze medalist(s)	7	Viktoriia Slanova	Neutral Paralympic Athletes	1:03.61	PB
4	5	Sheryl James	South Africa	1:06.88	
5	2	Liezel Gouws	South Africa	1:08.33	
6	4	Laure Ustaritz	France	1:09.20	
7	9	Neda Bahi	Tunisia	1:11.52	
8	3	Selma van Kerm	Belgium	1:14.80	

=== T38 ===
The T38 category is for ambulant athletes with cerebral palsy. T38 athletes have the mildest form of impairment caused by cerebral palsy, often in only one limb, and not affecting the ability to run, walk or jump freely, although impairing performance. T38 athletes may suffer minor co-ordination difficulties.

The final in this classification took place on 7 September 2024, at 20:31:

Rank	Lane	Name	Nationality	Time	Notes
1st place, gold medalist(s)	8	Karen Palomeque	Colombia	58.67	WR
2nd place, silver medalist(s)	6	Luca Ekler	Hungary	59.35	AR
3rd place, bronze medalist(s)	7	Lindy Ave	Germany	1:00.37	SB
4	5	Margarita Goncharova	Neutral Paralympic Athletes	1:00.64	
5	2	Rhiannon Clarke	Australia	1:00.81	AR
6	4	Ali Smith	Great Britain	1:00.88	PB
7	3	Nele Moos	Germany	1:00.91	PB
8	2	Sofia Pace	France	1:02.29	PB

=== T47 ===
The T47 category is for athletes who have a single below elbow or wrist amputation or similar disability, with normal function in both legs.

The final in this classification took place on 31 August 2024, at 21:19:

Rank	Lane	Name	Nationality	Time	Notes
1st place, gold medalist(s)	6	Fernanda Yara da Silva	Brazil	56.74	PB
2nd place, silver medalist(s)	8	Lisbeli Marina Vera Andrade	Venezuela	56.78	PB
3rd place, bronze medalist(s)	4	Maria Clara Augusto da Silva	Brazil	57.20	PB
4	5	Petra Luteran	Hungary	57.41	PB
5	7	Amanda Rummery	Canada	58.02	
6	9	Anastasiia Soloveva	Neutral Paralympic Athletes	58.20	SB
7	2	Sae Tsuji	Japan	59.13	SB
8	3	Jule Ross	Germany	59.47	

=== T53 ===
The T53 category is for wheelchair athletes with normal use of arms and hands, no or limited trunk function, and no leg function.

The final in this classification took place on 5 September 2024, at 19:25:

Rank	Lane	Name	Nationality	Time	Notes
1st place, gold medalist(s)	5	Catherine Debrunner	Switzerland	51.60	PR
2nd place, silver medalist(s)	6	Samantha Kinghorn	Great Britain	53.45	
3rd place, bronze medalist(s)	7	Zhou Hongzhuan	China	55.09	
4	8	Gao Fang	China	56.53	
5	4	Hamide Doğangün	Turkey	56.90	SB
6	9	Angela Ballard	Australia	59.12	
7	3	Jessica Cooper Lewis	Bermuda	1:00.82	
8	2	Chelsea Stein	United States	1:06.47	

=== T54 ===
The T54 category is for wheelchair athletes with no leg function, but near full arm function and reasonable to normal trunk function. Typically this may be caused by a lower spinal cord injury or spinal cord birth defect.

The final in this classification took place on 5 September 2024, at 19:33:

Rank	Lane	Name	Nationality	Time	Notes
1st place, gold medalist(s)	5	Léa Bayekula	Belgium	53.05	
2nd place, silver medalist(s)	6	Manuela Schär	Switzerland	53.14	
3rd place, bronze medalist(s)	8	Zhou Zhaoqian	China	54.01	
4	7	Hannah Dederick	United States	54.68	
5	3	Amanda Kotaja	Finland	54.89	
6	9	Melanie Woods	Great Britain	55.39	
7	2	Jessica Cooper Lewis	Bermuda	55.55	
—	4	Tatyana McFadden	United States	DQ	
