= Athletics at the 2020 Summer Paralympics – Women's 200 metres T37 =

Women's 200 metres T37 at the XVI Paralympic Games
- Venue: Tokyo National Stadium
- Dates: 27 August 2021 (final)
- Competitors: 16 from 14 nations
- Winning time: 26.58

Medalists
1st place, gold medalist(s)		Wen Xiaoyan	China
2nd place, silver medalist(s)		Jiang Fenfen	China
3rd place, bronze medalist(s)		Mandy François-Elie	France

The women's 200 metres T37 event at the 2020 Summer Paralympics in Tokyo, took place on 27 August 2021.

The T37 category is for ambulant athletes with cerebral palsy. These athletes have movement and coordination problems on one half of their body. They have good ability in their dominant side of their body (ie hemiplegia).

== Records ==
Prior to the competition, the existing records were as follows:

World Record	Wen Xiaoyan (CHN)	27.11	Dubai, United Arab Emirates	15 November 2019
Paralympic Record	Lisa McIntosh (AUS)	28.42	Sydney, Australia	27 October 2000

Area	Time	Athlete	Nation
Africa	27.98	Sheryl James	South Africa
America	28.06	Jaleen Roberts	United States
Asia	27.11 WR	Wen Xiaoyan	China
Europe	27.21	Georgina Hermitage	Great Britain
Oceania	28.42 PR	Lisa McIntosh	Australia

== Results ==
=== Heats ===
Heat 1 took place on 27 August 2021, at 11:37:

Rank	Lane	Name	Nationality	Time	Notes
1	3	Mandy François-Elie	France	27.43	Q, PR
2	4	Jiang Fenfen	China	27.57	Q, SB
3	8	Jaleen Roberts	United States	28.07	
4	7	Alina Terekh	Ukraine	29.40	=PB
5	6	Elena Tretiakova	RPC	29.85	
5	5	Liezel Gouws	South Africa	DQ	WPA 18.5a

Heat 2 took place on 27 August 2021, at 11:44:

Rank	Lane	Name	Nationality	Time	Notes
1	6	Wen Xiaoyan	China	27.16	Q, PR
2	2	Sheryl James	South Africa	27.73	Q, AR
3	3	Nataliia Kobzar	Ukraine	28.22	Q
4	5	Viktoriia Slanova	RPC	28.56	q, PB
5	4	Sabina Sukhanova	Uzbekistan	29.26	q, SB
-	7	Norma Salinas	El Salvador	DNF	
-	8	Anais Anne Lise Angeline	Mauritius	DQ	WPA 18.5a

=== Final ===
The final took place on 27 August 2021, at 19:16:

Rank	Lane	Name	Nationality	Time	Notes
1st place, gold medalist(s)	4	Wen Xiaoyan	China	26.58	WR
2nd place, silver medalist(s)	7	Jiang Fenfen	China	27.33	PB
3rd place, bronze medalist(s)	5	Mandy François-Elie	France	27.34	
4	6	Sheryl James	South Africa	27.57	AR
5	8	Nataliia Kobzar	Ukraine	27.92	
6	9	Jaleen Roberts	United States	28.02	AR
7	3	Viktoriia Slanova	RPC	28.84	
	2	Sabina Sukhanova	Uzbekistan	DNS	
