= Athletics at the 2020 Summer Paralympics – Women's 100 metres T37 =

Women's 100 metres T37 at the XVI Paralympic Games
- Venue: Tokyo National Stadium
- Dates: 1 September 2021 (heats); 2 September 2021 (final)
- Competitors: 12 from 9 nations
- Winning time: 13.00

Medalists
1st place, gold medalist(s)		Wen Xiaoyan	China
2nd place, silver medalist(s)		Jaleen Roberts	United States
3rd place, bronze medalist(s)		Jiang Fenfen	China

The women's 100 metres T37 event at the 2020 Summer Paralympics in Tokyo, took place between 1 and 2 September 2021.

The T37 category is for ambulant athletes with cerebral palsy. These athletes have movement and coordination problems on one half of their body. They have good ability in their dominant side of their body (ie hemiplegia).

== Records ==
Prior to the competition, the existing records were as follows:

World Record	Mandy François-Elie (FRA)	13.10	Nottwil, Switzerland	24 May 2019
Paralympic Record	Georgina Hermitage (GBR)	13.13	Rio de Janeiro, Brazil	9 September 2016

Area	Time	Athlete	Nation
Africa	13.67	Sheryl James	South Africa
America	13.49	Jaleen Roberts	United States
Asia	13.20	Wen Xiaoyan	China
Europe	13.10 WR	Mandy François-Elie	France
Oceania	13.88	Lisa McIntosh	Australia

== Results ==
=== Heats ===
Heat 1 took place on 1 September 2021, at 21:46:

Rank	Lane	Name	Nationality	Time	Notes
1	8	Jiang Fenfen	China	13.34	Q, SB
2	4	Mandy François-Elie	France	13.48	Q
3	3	Sheryl James	South Africa	13.58	Q, AR
4	7	Nataliia Kobzar	Ukraine	13.85	q
5	5	Anna Sapozhnikova	RPC	14.50	
6	6	Norma Salinas	El Salvador	16.70	SB

Heat 2 took place on 1 September 2021, at 21:52:

Rank	Lane	Name	Nationality	Time	Notes
1	7	Wen Xiaoyan	China	13.26	Q, SB
2	5	Jaleen Roberts	United States	13.41	Q, AR
3	6	Viktoriia Slanova	RPC	13.88	Q
4	3	Sabina Sukhanova	Uzbekistan	13.91	q, SB
5	4	Alina Terekh	Ukraine	14.58	
6	8	Anais Anne Lise Angeline	Mauritius	15.35	SB

=== Final ===
The final took place on 2 September 2021, at 10:37:

Rank	Lane	Name	Nationality	Time	Notes
1st place, gold medalist(s)	6	Wen Xiaoyan	China	13.00	WR
2nd place, silver medalist(s)	5	Jaleen Roberts	United States	13.16	AR
3rd place, bronze medalist(s)	4	Jiang Fenfen	China	13.17	PB
4	7	Mandy François-Elie	France	13.51	
5	9	Sheryl James	South Africa	13.67	
6	3	Nataliia Kobzar	Ukraine	13.78	
7	2	Sabina Sukhanova	Uzbekistan	14.20	
8	8	Viktoriia Slanova	RPC	14.26	
