= Athletics at the 2024 Summer Paralympics – Women's 100 metres T37 =

Women's 100 metres T37 at the XVII Paralympic Games
- Venue: Stade de France
- Dates: 3 September 2024 (heats); 4 September 2024 (final)
- Competitors: 11 from 7 nations
- Winning time: 12.52

Medalists
1st place, gold medalist(s)		Wen Xiaoyan	China
2nd place, silver medalist(s)		Taylor Swanson	United States
3rd place, bronze medalist(s)		Jaleen Roberts	United States

100 metres at the 2024 Summer Paralympics
Men · T11 · T12 · T13 · T34 · T35 · T36 · T37 · T38 · T44 · T47 · T51 · T52 · T53 · T54 · T63 · T64
Women · T11 · T12 · T13 · T34 · T35 · T36 · T37 · T38 · T47 · T53 · T54 · T63 · T64

The women's 100 metres T37 event at the 2024 Summer Paralympics in Paris, took place between 3 and 4 September 2024.

The T37 category is for ambulant athletes with cerebral palsy. These athletes have movement and coordination problems on one half of their body. They have good ability in their dominant side of their body (ie hemiplegia).

== Records ==
Prior to the competition, the existing records were as follows:

World Record	Wen Xiaoyan (CHN)	12.27	(Japan) Kobe	21 May 2024
Paralympic Record	Wen Xiaoyan (CHN)	13.00	(Japan) Tokyo	2 September

Area	Time		Athlete	Location	Date
Africa	13.53		(South Africa) Sheryl James	(United Kingdom) Birmingham	2 August 2022
America	12.82		(Colombia) Karen Palomeque	(France) Paris	13 July 2023
Asia	12.27	WR	(China) Wen Xiaoyan	(Japan) Kobe	21 May 2024
Europe	13.10		(France) Mandy François-Elie	(Switzerland) Nottwil	24 May 2019
Oceania	13.88		(Australia) Lisa McIntosh	(Australia) Sydney	25 October 2000

== Results ==
=== Round 1 ===
First 3 in each heat (Q) and the next 2 fastest (q) advance to the Final.

==== Heat 1 ====
Rank	Lane	Athlete	Nation	Time	Notes
1	7	Taylor Swanson	United States	13.16	Q
2	4	Jiang Fenfen	China	13.40	Q
3	6	Sheryl James	South Africa	13.69	Q
4	3	Viktoriia Slanova	Neutral Paralympic Athletes	13.70	q
5	5	Aorawan Chimpaen	Thailand	15.25	
6	8	Laura Burbulla	Germany	15.33	SB
Source:				Wind: +0.8 m/s	

==== Heat 2 ====
Rank	Lane	Athlete	Nation	Time	Notes
1	4	Wen Xiaoyan	China	12.86	Q, PR
2	6	Jaleen Roberts	United States	13.34	Q, SB
3	5	Mandy Francois-Elie	France	13.52	Q
4	7	Nataliia Kobzar	Ukraine	13.55	q, SB
-	3	Elena Tretiakova	Neutral Paralympic Athletes	DNS	
Source:				Wind: +0.2 m/s	

=== Final ===
Rank	Lane	Athlete	Nation	Time	Notes
1st place, gold medalist(s)	6	Wen Xiaoyan	China	12.52	PR
2nd place, silver medalist(s)	7	Taylor Swanson	United States	13.19	
3rd place, bronze medalist(s)	5	Jaleen Roberts	United States	13.29	SB
4	4	Jiang Fenfen	China	13.34	
5	8	Mandy Francois-Elie	France	13.67	
6	2	Nataliia Kobzar	Ukraine	13.70	
7	9	Viktoriia Slanova	Neutral Paralympic Athletes	13.82	
8	3	Sheryl James	South Africa	13.90	
Source:				Wind: -0.2 m/s	
