= Athletics at the 2020 Summer Paralympics – Women's 400 metres T37 =

Women's 400 metres T37 at the XVI Paralympic Games
- Venue: Tokyo National Stadium
- Dates: 31 August 2021 (final)
- Competitors: 8 from 5 nations
- Winning time: 1:01.36

Medalists
1st place, gold medalist(s)		Jiang Fenfen	China
2nd place, silver medalist(s)		Nataliia Kobzar	Ukraine
3rd place, bronze medalist(s)		Sheryl James	South Africa

The women's 400 metres T37 event at the 2020 Summer Paralympics in Tokyo, took place on 31 August 2021.

The T37 category is for ambulant athletes with cerebral palsy. These athletes have movement and coordination problems on one half of their body. They have good ability in their dominant side of their body (ie hemiplegia).

== Records ==
Prior to the competition, the existing records were as follows:

World record	Georgina Hermitage (GBR)	1:00.29	London, United Kingdom	20 July 2017
Paralympic record	Georgina Hermitage (GBR)	1:00.53	Rio de Janeiro, Brazil	13 September 2016

Area	Time	Athlete	Nation
Africa	1:03.71	Neda Bahi	Tunisia
America	1:10.75	Leah Robinson	Canada
Asia	1:02.90	Jiang Fenfen	China
Europe	1:00.29 WR	Georgina Hermitage	Great Britain
Oceania	1:09.29	Lisa McIntosh	Australia

== Results ==
The final took place on 31 August 2021, at 21:45:

Rank	Lane	Name	Nationality	Time	Notes
1st place, gold medalist(s)	7	Jiang Fenfen	China	1:01.36	AR
2nd place, silver medalist(s)	5	Nataliia Kobzar	Ukraine	1:01.47	PB
3rd place, bronze medalist(s)	6	Sheryl James	South Africa	1:03.82	PB
4	2	Alina Terekh	Ukraine	1:05.96	PB
5	8	Liezel Gouws	South Africa	1:06.85	SB
6	4	Elena Tretiakova	RPC	1:07.18	SB
7	3	Dina Zamly Ali	Egypt	1:17.73	SB
	9	Viktoriia Slanova	RPC	DQ	
