= Athletics at the 2024 Summer Paralympics – Women's 400 metres T37 =

Women's 400 metres T37 at the XVII Paralympic Games
- Venue: Stade de France
- Dates: 3 September 2024
- Competitors: 8 from 7 nations
- Winning time: 1:00.92

Medalists
1st place, gold medalist(s)		Nataliia Kobzar	Ukraine
2nd place, silver medalist(s)		Jiang Fenfen	China
3rd place, bronze medalist(s)		Viktoriia Slanova	Neutral Paralympic Athletes

400 metres at the 2024 Summer Paralympics
Men · T11 · T12 · T13 · T20 · T36 · T37 · T38 · T47 · T52 · T53 · T54 · T62
Women · T11 · T12 · T13 · T20 · T37 · T38 · T47 · T53 · T54 ·

The women's 400 metres T37 event at the 2024 Summer Paralympics in Paris, took place on 3 September 2024.

The T37 category is for ambulant athletes with cerebral palsy. These athletes have movement and coordination problems on one half of their body. They have good ability in their dominant side of their body (ie hemiplegia).

== Records ==
Prior to the competition, the existing records were as follows:

World Record	Georgina Hermitage (GBR)	1:00.29	(United Kingdom) London	20 July 2017
Paralympic Record	Georgina Hermitage (GBR)	1:00.53	(Brazil) Rio de Janeiro	13 September 2016

Area	Time		Athlete	Location	Date
Africa	1:03.38		(South Africa) Sheryl James	(France) Paris	10 July 2023
America	1:00.44		(Colombia) Karen Palomeque	(United Arab Emirates) Dubai	21 March 2022
Asia	1:01.36		(China) Jiang Fenfen	(Japan) Tokyo	31 August 2021
Europe	1:00.29	WR	(United Kingdom) Georgina Hermitage	(United Kingdom) London	20 July 2017
Oceania	1:09.29		(Australia) Lisa McIntosh	(Australia) Campbelltown	15 January 2003

== Results ==
=== Final ===
Rank	Lane	Athlete	Nation	Time	Notes
1st place, gold medalist(s)	8	Nataliia Kobzar	Ukraine	1:00.92	PB
2nd place, silver medalist(s)	6	Jiang Fenfen	China	1:01.88	SB
3rd place, bronze medalist(s)	7	Viktoriia Slanova	Neutral Paralympic Athletes	1:03.61	PB
4	5	Sheryl James	South Africa	1:06.88	
5	2	Liezel Gouws	South Africa	1:08.33	
6	4	Laure Ustaritz	France	1:09.20	
7	9	Neda Bahi	Tunisia	1:11.52	
8	3	Selma van Kerm	Belgium	1:14.80	
