= Athletics at the 2016 Summer Paralympics – Women's 400 metres T37 =

Women's 400 metres T37 at the XV Paralympic Games
- Venue: Estádio Olímpico João Havelange
- Dates: 13 September 2016
- Competitors: 11 from 8 nations

Medalists
1st place, gold medalist(s)		Georgina Hermitage	Great Britain
2nd place, silver medalist(s)		Xiaoyan Wen	China
3rd place, bronze medalist(s)		Neda Bahi	Tunisia

The T37 category is for ambulant athletes with cerebral palsy. These athletes have movement and coordination problems on one half of their body. They have good ability in their dominant side of their body (ie hemiplegia).

The Athletics at the 2016 Summer Paralympics – Women's 400 metres T37 event at the 2016 Paralympic Games took place on 13 September 2016, at the Estádio Olímpico João Havelange.

== Heats ==
=== Heat 1 ===
10:24 12 September 2016:

Rank	Lane	Bib	Name	Nationality	Reaction	Time	Notes
1	6	332	Georgina Hermitage	Great Britain		1:03.44	Q
2	7	828	Neda Bahi	Tunisia		1:05.28	Q
3	4	165	Fenfen Jiang	China		1:05.68	Q
4	3	598	Johanna Benson	Namibia		1:10.79	q
5	5	363	Isabelle Foerder	Germany		1:16.25	

=== Heat 2 ===
10:32 12 September 2016:

Rank	Lane	Bib	Name	Nationality	Reaction	Time	Notes
1	6	177	Xiaoyan Wen	China		1:03.73	Q
2	5	305	Mandy Francois-Elie	France		1:04.94	Q
3	7	735	Liezel Gouws	South Africa		1:07.86	Q
4	8	168	Yingli Li	China		1:08.84	q
5	4	364	Maike Hausberger	Germany		1:12.22	
6	3	806	Domingas da Costa	Timor-Leste		1:26.26	

== Final ==
10:14 13 September 2016:

Rank	Lane	Bib	Name	Nationality	Reaction	Time	Notes
1st place, gold medalist(s)	3	332	Georgina Hermitage	Great Britain		1:00.53	
2nd place, silver medalist(s)	5	177	Xiaoyan Wen	China		1:03.28	
3rd place, bronze medalist(s)	6	828	Neda Bahi	Tunisia		1:03.71	
4	7	165	Fenfen Jiang	China		1:05.66	
5	4	305	Mandy Francois-Elie	France		1:06.09	
6	1	168	Yingli Li	China		1:07.45	
7	8	735	Liezel Gouws	South Africa		1:09.08	
8	2	598	Johanna Benson	Namibia		1:12.35	
