= South Africa at the 2020 Summer Paralympics =

- Flag of South Africa
- IPC code: RSA
- NPC: South African Sports Confederation and Olympic Committee
- Website: www.sascoc.co.za

in Tokyo, Japan 24 August 2021 – 5 September 2021
- Competitors: 34 in 7 sports
- Flag bearers (opening): Kgothatso Montjane; Charl du Toit
- Flag bearer (closing): Louzanne Coetzee
- Medals Ranked 34th: Gold 4 Silver 1 Bronze 2 Total 7

Summer Paralympics appearances (overview)
- 1964; 1968; 1972; 1976; 1980–1988; 1992; 1996; 2000; 2004; 2008; 2012; 2016; 2020; 2024

South Africa competed at the 2020 Summer Paralympics in Tokyo, Japan, from 24 August to 5 September 2021. The team of 34 athletes competing in seven sports was announced on 14 August 2021, the chef de mission was Leon Fleiser. This was the smallest delegation since the 1992 Summer Paralympics. Except for one gold medal in cycling, all the team's medals, four gold, one silver and two bronze, were won in athletics. Three African and three World records were also set in athletics. South Africa did not enter any team sports.

== Medalists ==
| Medal | Name | Sport | Event | Date |
|---|---|---|---|---|
| Gold | Anrune Weyers | Athletics | Women's 400 metres T47 | 28 August |
| Gold | Ntando Mahlangu | Athletics | Men's long jump T63 | 28 August |
| Gold | Nicolas Pieter du Preez | Cycling | Men's road time trial H1 | 31 August |
| Gold | Ntando Mahlangu | Athletics | Men's 200 metres T61 | 3 September |
| Silver | Louzanne Coetzee | Athletics | Women's 1500 metres T11 | 30 August |
| Bronze | Sheryl James | Athletics | Women's 400 metres T37 | 31 August |
| Bronze | Louzanne Coetzee | Athletics | Women's marathon T12 | 5 September |

=== Multiple medallists ===
The following competitors won several medals at the 2020 Paralympic Games.

| Name | Medal | Sport | Event |
|---|---|---|---|
| Ntando Mahlangu | Gold | Athletics | Men's long jump T63 |
| Ntando Mahlangu | Gold | Athletics | Men's 200 metres T61 |

== Archery ==
Two archers, Shaun Anderson (W1) and Philip Coates-Palgrave competed.

Men

| Athlete | Event | Ranking round | | Round of 32 | Round of 16 | Quarterfinals | Semifinals | Finals | |
| Athlete | Event | Score | Seed | Opposition score | Opposition score | Opposition score | Opposition score | Opposition score | Rank |
|---|---|---|---|---|---|---|---|---|---|
| Shaun Anderson | Individual W1 | 637 | 7 | —N/a | Luiz Jaime Games Perilo (BRA); L 123–123 (SO 9-6) | did not advance | | | |
| Philip Coates-Palgrave | Individual compound open | 646 | 36 | de Castro (BRA); W 142–135 | Manshaezadeh (IRI); L 130–143 | did not advance | | | |

== Athletics ==
Eighteen athletes, eleven men and seven women, represented South Africa in athletics:

Men's track

| Athlete | Event | Heats | | Final | |
| Athlete | Event | Result | Rank | Result | Rank |
|---|---|---|---|---|---|
| Dyan Buis | 100m T38 | 11.75 | 5 | did not advance | |
| Dyan Buis | 400m T38 | 51.29 | 1 | 51.39 | 5 |
| Daniel Du Plessis | 100m T64 | 11.72 | 7 | did not advance | |
| Daniel Du Plessis | 400m T62 | —N/a | | 53.56 | 7 |
| Charl du Toit | 100m T37 | 11.58 | 5 | 11.63 | 8 |
| Charl du Toit | 200m T37 | 24.04 | 4 | did not advance | |
| Charl du Toit | 400m T37 | —N/a | | 51.14 | 5 |
| Puseletso Michael Mabote | 100m T63 | 12.64 AR | 3 | 12.66 | 7 |
| Ntando Mahlangu | 200m T61 | —N/a | | 23.59 | 1st place, gold medalist(s) |
| Mpumelelo Mhlongo | 100m T64 | 11.06 | 3 | 11.03 | 5 |
| Mpumelelo Mhlongo | 200m T64 | 22.81 WR (T44) | 2 | 22.86 | 5 |
| Tebogo Mofokeng | 100m T64 | 11.40 | 7 | did not advance | |
| Tebogo Mofokeng | 400m T62 | —N/a | —N/a | 50.09 AR | 4 |
| Jonathan Ntutu | 100m T12 | 11.23 | 3 | did not advance | |

Men's field

| Athlete | Event | Final | | |
| Athlete | Event | Result | Points | Rank |
|---|---|---|---|---|
| Reinhardt Hamman | Javelin throw F38 | 52.49 | | 6 |
| Ntando Mahlangu | Long jump T61 | 7.17 WR | | 1st place, gold medalist(s) |
| Puseletso Michael Mabote | Long jump T63 | 5.18 | | 9 |
| Mpumelelo Mhlongo | Long jump T64 | 6.80 | | 5 |
| Dyan Buis | Long jump T38 | 5.94 | | 10 |
| Kerwin Noemdo | Shot put F46 | 15.65 AR | | 4 |
| Tyrone Pillay | Shot put F63 | 11.94 | | 8 |

Women's track

| Athlete | Event | Heats | | Final | |
| Athlete | Event | Result | Rank | Result | Rank |
|---|---|---|---|---|---|
| Louzanne Coetzee | 1500m T11 | 4:49.24 | 1 | 4:40.96 AR | 2nd place, silver medalist(s) |
| Louzanne Coetzee | Marathon T12 | —N/a | | 3:11:13 WR (T11) | 3rd place, bronze medalist(s) |
| Liezel Gouws | 200m T37 | DQ | | did not advance | |
| Liezel Gouws | 400m T37 | —N/a | | 1:06.85 | 5 |
| Sheryl James | 100m T37 | 13.58 AR | 3 | 13.67 | 5 |
| Sheryl James | 200m T37 | 27.73 | 2 | 27.57 AR | 4 |
| Sheryl James | 400m T37 | —N/a | | 1:03.82 | 3rd place, bronze medalist(s) |
| Johanna Pretorius | 100m T13 | 12.41 | 3 | 12.33 | 5 |
| Anrune Weyers | 100m T47 | 12.66 | 4 | did not advance | |
| Anrune Weyers | 200m T47 | 25.62 | 1 | 25.51 | 4 |
| Anrune Weyers | 400m T47 | 57.59 | 2 | 56.05 | 1st place, gold medalist(s) |

Women's field

| Athlete | Event | Final | | |
| Athlete | Event | Result | Points | Rank |
|---|---|---|---|---|
| Simoné Kruger | Discus throw F38 | 31.51 | | 5 |
| Zanele Situ | Shot put F54 | 16.22 | | 5 |

== Cycling ==
Three South African cyclists, two men and one woman, competed in road cycling:

Road Events — Women

| Athlete | Event | Time | Rank |
|---|---|---|---|
| Toni Mould | Women's road time trial T1-2 | 53:46.89 | 10 |
| Toni Mould | Women's road race T1-2 | 1:52:17 | 8 |

Road Events — Men

| Athlete | Event | Time | Rank |
|---|---|---|---|
| Nicholas Pieter du Preez | Men's road time trial H2 | 43:49.41 | 1st place, gold medalist(s) |
| Nicholas Pieter du Preez | Men's road race H1-2 | Lapped | 8 |
| Ernst van Dyk | Men's road time trial H5 | 44:34.88 | 9 |
| Ernst van Dyk | Men's road race H5 | 2:36:23 | 8 |

== Equestrian ==
South Africa entered two equestrian competitors, both women, Philippa Johnson-Dwyer (Grade IV) and Cayla van der Walt (Grade V) for the individual dressage competition.

Individual

| Athlete | Horse | Event | Total | |
| Athlete | Horse | Event | Score | Rank |
|---|---|---|---|---|
| Philippa Johnson-Dwyer | Just In Time | Individual championship test grade IV | 69.780 | 8 Q |
| Philippa Johnson-Dwyer | Just In Time | Individual freestyle test grade IV | 71.155 | 8 |
| Cayla van der Walt | Daturo II | Individual championship test grade V | 66.643 | 11 |
| Cayla van der Walt | Daturo II | Individual freestyle test grade V | did not advance | |

== Swimming ==
Four South African swimmers, two men and two women, competed.

| Athlete | Event | Heats | | Final | |
| Athlete | Event | Result | Rank | Result | Rank |
|---|---|---|---|---|---|
| Christian Sadie | Men's 50m freestyle S7 | 29.22 | 4 | did not advance | |
| Christian Sadie | Men's 100m backstroke S7 | did not start | | did not advance | |
| Christian Sadie | Men's 50m butterfly S7 | 30.57 | 4 | DQ Disqualified | |
| Christian Sadie | Men's 100m breaststroke SB7 | —N/a | | 1:24.49 | 5 |
| Christian Sadie | Men's 200m individual medley SM7 | 2:36.75 | 3 | 2:35.94 AF | 6 |
| Hendrik van der Merwe | Men's 100m breaststroke SB5 | 1:46.22 | 5 | did not advance | |
| Alani Ferreira | Women's 100m butterfly S13 | 1:20.25 | 17 | did not advance | |
| Alani Ferreira | Women's 400m freestyle S13 | 5:02.42 AF | 7 | did not advance | |
| Alani Ferreira | Women's 100m breaststroke SB13 | 1:25.01 | 6 | did not advance | |
| Kat Swanepoel | Women's 50m backstroke S4 | 52.04 | 2 | 50.17 | 4 |
| Kat Swanepoel | Women's 150m individual medley SM4 | 3:21.19 | 4 | did not advance | |

== Table tennis ==
One table tennis player, Theo Cogill (Class10), competed.

| Athlete | Event | Group Stage | | | | Round of 16 | Quarterfinals | Semifinals | Final | |
| Athlete | Event | Opposition Result | Opposition Result | Opposition Result | Rank | Opposition Result | Opposition Result | Opposition Result | Opposition Result | Rank |
|---|---|---|---|---|---|---|---|---|---|---|
| Theo Cogill | Individual C10 | Gardos (AUT); L (0-3) (5-11, 9-11, 7-11) | Carbinatti Junior (BRA); L (0-3) (8-11, 12-14, 5-11) | Bohéas (FRA); L (1-3) (15-13, 11-5, 7-11, 11-9) | 4 | —N/a | did not advance | | | |

== Wheelchair tennis ==
South Africa entered four wheelchair tennis players, two men and two women.

| Athlete | Event | Round of 64 | Round of 32 | Round of 16 | Quarterfinals | Semifinals | Final / BM | |
| Athlete | Event | Opposition Result | Opposition Result | Opposition Result | Opposition Result | Opposition Result | Opposition Result | Rank |
|---|---|---|---|---|---|---|---|---|
| Leon Els | Men's singles | Carneiro Silva (BRA); W 1-6, 6-4, 6-3 | Reid (GBR); L 2-6, 0-6 | did not advance | | | | |
| Evans Maripa | Men's singles | Flax (AUT); W 6-2, 6-0 | Caverzaschi (ESP); L 6-2, 6-4 | did not advance | | | | |
| Leon Els & Evans Maripa | Men's doubles | —N/a | Ratzlaff/Stroud (USA); L 5-7, 6-1, 6-2 | did not advance | | | | |
| Kgothatso Montjane | Women's singles | —N/a | Takamuro (JPN); W 6-2, 6-1 | Wang (CHN); L 6-2, 6-3 | did not advance | | | |
| Mariska Venter | Women's singles | —N/a | Ohtani (JPN); L 6-1, 6-2 | did not advance | | | | |
| Kgothatso Montjane & Mariska Venter | Women's doubles | —N/a | —N/a | Bernal/Martinez (COL); W 6-1, 6-1 | Shuker/Whiley (GBR); L 6-2, 6-0 | did not advance | | |

== See also ==
- South Africa at the Paralympics
- South Africa at the 2020 Summer Olympics
