= Athletics at the 2016 Summer Paralympics – Women's 4 × 100 metres relay =

The Women's 4 x 100 metres relay athletics events for the 2016 Summer Paralympics took place at the Estádio Olímpico João Havelange between 14 and 15 September 2016. A total of two events was contested over this distance, with the T11-T13 event being open to three different disability classifications for visually impaired athletes and the T35-38 event open to four classifications for athletes with cerebral palsy or similar impairments.

== Schedule ==
| R | Round 1 | ½ | Semifinals | F | Final |

| Event↓/Date → | Thu 8 | Fri 9 | Sat 10 | Sun 11 | Mon 12 | Tue 13 | Wed 14 | Thu 15 | Fri 16 | Sat 17 |
|---|---|---|---|---|---|---|---|---|---|---|
| T11-13 4 x 100m | | | | | | | F | | | |
| T35-38 4 x 100m | | | | | | | | F | | |

== Results ==
=== T11-13 ===
The T11 category is for athletes with a visual impairment. A T11 athlete may be entirely without sight, or be able to perceive light, but have no ability to see the shape of a hand at any distance. T11 athletes commonly run with guides. The T12 category is for athletes with visual impairment. Athletes in this category will generally have some residual sight, the ability to recognise the shape of a hand at a distance of 2 metres and the ability to perceive clearly will be no more than 2/60. T12 athletes commonly run with guides. The T13 category is for athletes with a moderate visual impairment. Athletes in this category have a variety of visual impairments, but can typically recognize contours from a distance of 2 to 6 metres. Athletes in this category do not typically require a guide.

| Rank | Lane | Nation | Competitors | Time | Notes |
|---|---|---|---|---|---|
| 1st place, gold medalist(s) | 1 | China | Zhou Guohua (T11) guide : Jia Dengpu; Shen Yaqin (T12) guide : Li Wen; Jia Juntingxian (T11) guide : Shi Yang; Liu Cuiqing (T11) guide : Xu Donglin | 47.18 WR | |
| 2nd place, silver medalist(s) | 5 | Brazil | Vitória Simplício da Silva (T11) guide : Felipe Veloso; Alice de Oliveira Correa (T12) guide : Diogo Cardoso da Silva; Lorena Salvatini Spoladore (T11) guide : Renato Ben Hur Oliveira; Terezinha Guilhermina (T11) guide : Rafael Lazarini | 47.57 RR | |
| 3rd place, bronze medalist(s) | 3 | Colombia | Marcela Gonzalez (T12) guide : Niver Rangel Palmera; Sonia Sirley Luna Rodriguez (T11) guide : Wilmar Cabrera Estremor; Maritza Arango Buitrago (T11) guide : Jonathan Sanchez Gonzalez; Yesenia Restrepo (T11) guide : Juan Cortes Agudelo | 51.93 SB | |
| 4 | 4 | Spain | Lia Beel Quintana (T11) guide : David Alonso Gutierrez; Izaskun Oses Ayucar (T12); Melani Berges Gamez (T12) guide : Sergio Sanchez Palancar; Sara Martínez Puntero (T12) | 52.40 SB | |

=== T35-38 ===
The T35 category is for ambulant athletes with cerebral palsy. The typical T35 athlete may need assistive devices for walking. The athlete may have sufficient function to run but demonstrates poor balance. The T36 category is for ambulant athletes with cerebral palsy. These athletes do not have the capacity to remain still and they show involuntary movements with all four limbs affected. They usually walk without assistive devices. The T37 category is for ambulant athletes with cerebral palsy. These athletes have movement and coordination problems on one half of their body. They have good ability in their dominant side of their body (ie hemiplegia). The T38 category is for ambulant athletes with cerebral palsy. T38 athletes have the mildest form of impairment caused by cerebral palsy, often in only one limb, and not affecting the ability to run, walk or jump freely, although impairing performance. T38 athletes may suffer minor co-ordination difficulties.

| Rank | Lane | Nation | Competitors | Time | Notes |
|---|---|---|---|---|---|
| 1st place, gold medalist(s) | 6 | China | Jiang Fenfen (T37); Chen Junfei (T38); Li Yingli (T37); Wen Xiaoyan (T37) | 50.81 WR | |
| 2nd place, silver medalist(s) | 4 | Great Britain | Kadeena Cox (T38); Maria Lyle (T35); Georgina Hermitage (T37); Sophie Hahn (T38) | 51.07 RR | |
| 3rd place, bronze medalist(s) | 5 | Australia | Ella Pardy (T38); Isis Holt (T35); Jodi Elkington-Jones (T37); Erin Cleaver (T38) | 55.09 RR | |
| 4 | 7 | Germany | Lindy Ave (T38); Maria Seifert (T37); Nicole Nicoleitzik (T38); Claudia Nicoleitzik (T36) | 56.04 SB | |
| 5 | 3 | Colombia | Martha Patricia Lizcano Tibocha (T37); Martha Liliana Hernández Florián (T36); Dayana Anyuor Guerra Beltran (T37); Daniela Rodriguez Angulo (T36) | 1:01.85 SB | |
