= 2019 World Para Athletics Championships – Women's 100 metres =

The women's 100 metres at the 2019 World Para Athletics Championships was held in Dubai from 7 to 15 November.

== Medalists ==
Event	Gold		Silver		Bronze	
T11	Jerusa Geber dos Santos; Guide: Gabriel Aparecido dos Santos Garcia; Brazil	11.80	Liu Cuiqing; Guide: Donglin Xu; China	11.87	Lorena Salvatini Spoladore; Guide: Renato Oliveira; Brazil	12.03
T12	Omara Durand; Guide: Yuniol Kindelan; Cuba	11.66 WR	Adiaratou Iglesias Forneiro; Spain	11.99 PB	Viviane Ferreira Soares; Guide: Newton Vieira de Almeida Junior; Brazil	12.00 PB
T13	Leilia Adzhametova; Ukraine	12.19	Kym Crosby; United States	12.40	Johanna Pretorius; South Africa	12.50
T34	Hannah Cockroft; Great Britain	16.77	Kare Adenegan; Great Britain	17.49	Alexa Halko; United States	18.83
T35	Maria Lyle; Great Britain	14.62	Oxana Corso; Italy	15.42 SB	Nienke Timmer; Netherlands	15.48 PB
T36	Shi Yiting; China	13.62	Yanina Andrea Martinez; Argentina	14.02	Taschita Oliveira Cruz; Brazil	14.38
T37	Wen Xiaoyan; China	13.20 CR	Jiang Fenfen; China	13.31	Mandy Francois-Elie; France	13.37
T38	Sophie Hahn; Great Britain	12.38 WR	Luca Ekler; Hungary	12.89 PB	Rhiannon Clarke; Australia	12.94 AR
T47	Brittni Mason; United States	11.89 WR	Deja Young; United States	11.94	Anrune Weyers; South Africa	12.36
T52	Kerri Morgan; United States	21.16	Teruyo Tanaka; Japan	22.85	Yuka Kiyama; Japan	25.04
T53	Gao Fang; China	16.26 CR	Zhou Hongzhuan; China	16.58	Samantha Kinghorn; United Kingdom	16.64
T54	Amanda Kotaja; Finland	16.00 CR	Zhou Zhaoqian; China	16.23 SB	Cheri Madsen; United States	16.42 SB
T63	Karisma Evi Tiarani; Indonesia	14.72	Monica Graziana Contrafatto; Italy	15.56	Gitte Haenen; Belgium	15.60
T64	Irmgard Bensusan; Germany	12.86	Marlene van Gansewinkel; Netherlands	12.96	Kimberly Alkemade; Netherlands	13.04
RR3	Kayleigh Haggo; United Kingdom	18.32	Ellie Simpson; United Kingdom	18.87	Andrea Stokholm Overgaard; Denmark	21.12
WR world record | AR area record | CR championship record | GR games record | NR national record | OR Olympic record | PB personal best | SB season best | WL world leading (in a given season)

== See also ==
- List of IPC world records in athletics
