= 2017 World Para Athletics Championships – Women's 100 metres =

The women's 100 metres at the 2017 World Para Athletics Championships was held at the Olympic Stadium in London from 14 to 23 July.

== Medalists ==
Event	Gold		Silver		Bronze	
T11	Zhou Guohua; Guide: Jia Dengpu; China	12.16 SB	Esperança Gicaso; Guide: Nicolau Ernesto Palanca; Angola	12.87	Kewalin Wannaruemon; Guide: Panya Makhumjai; Thailand	13.51
T12	Omara Durand; Guide: Yuniol Kindelan; Cuba	11.52	Katrin Mueller-Rottgardt; Guide: Noel-Philippe Fiener; Germany	12.04	Malgorzata Ignasiak; Poland	13.14
T13	Leilia Adzhametova; Ukraine	12.00 CR	Ilse Hayes; South Africa	12.17 SB	Kym Crosby; United States	12.18 PB
T34	Hannah Cockroft; Great Britain	17.18 WR	Kare Adenegan; Great Britain	18.01	Alexa Halko; United States	18.43 AR
T35	Isis Holt; Australia	13.43 WR	Zhou Xia; China	13.56 AR	Maria Lyle; Great Britain	14.45
T36	Shi Yiting; China	13.68 WR	Yanina Andrea Martinez; Argentina	14.41	Jeon Min-Jae; South Korea	15.06 SB
T37	Georgina Hermitage; Great Britain	13.36 CR	Nataliia Kobzar; Ukraine	13.60 PB	Jaleen Roberts; United States	13.69
T38	Sophie Hahn; Great Britain	12.44 WR	Kadeena Cox; Great Britain	13.07 SB	Lindy Ave; Germany	13.16 PB
T42	Martina Caironi; Italy	14.65 SB	Monica Contrafatto; Italy	15.35 PB	Scout Bassett; United States	16.68
T44	Sophie Kamlish; Great Britain	12.92	Marlou van Rhijn; Netherlands	13.20	Nyoshia Cain; Trinidad and Tobago	13.25
T47	Deja Young; United States	12.39 SB	Alicja Fiodorow; Poland	12.61 SB	Li Lu; China	12.62 PB
T52	Teruyo Tanaka; Japan	23.09	Yuka Kiyama; Japan	25.17	Norsilawati Sa'at; Singapore	28.78
T53	Samantha Kinghorn; Great Britain	16.65	Angela Ballard; Australia	16.84	Zhou Hongzhuan; China	16.92 SB
T54	Amanda Kotaja; Finland	16.62	Cheri Madsen; United States	16.64	Hannah McFadden; United States	16.68 SB
WR world record | AR area record | CR championship record | GR games record | NR national record | OR Olympic record | PB personal best | SB season best | WL world leading (in a given season)

Events listed in pink were contested but no medals were awarded.

== See also ==
- List of IPC world records in athletics
