= 2019 World Para Athletics Championships – Women's 200 metres =

The women's 200 metres at the 2019 World Para Athletics Championships was held in Dubai from 7–15 November.

== Medalists ==
| Event | Gold | | Silver | | Bronze | |
|---|---|---|---|---|---|---|
| T11 | Liu Cuiqing; Guide: Xu Donglin; China | 24.89 | Thalita Vitória Simplício da Silva; Guide: Felipe Veloso da Silva; Brazil | 24.92 PB | Lorena Salvatini Spoladore; Guide: Renato Oliveira; Brazil | 25.62 |
| T12 | Omara Durand; Guide: Yuniol Kindelan Vargas; Cuba | 23.57 SB | Adiaratou Iglesias Forneiro; Spain | 24.31 PB | Oxana Boturchuk; Guide: Mykyta Barabanov; Ukraine | 24.44 SB |
| T13 | Leilia Adzhametova; Ukraine | 24.35 | Rayane Soares da Silva; Brazil | 25.22 | Kym Crosby; United States | 25.26 |
| T35 | Maria Lyle; Great Britain | 30.33 | Jagoda Kibil; Poland | 32.15 PB | Oxana Corso; Italy | 33.25 SB |
| T36 | Shi Yiting; China | 28.21 WR | Danielle Aitchison; New Zealand | 29.86 AR | Yanina Andrea Martinez; Argentina | 30.31 AR |
| T37 | Wen Xiaoyan; China | 27.11 WR | Mandy Francois-Elie; France | 27.24 PB | Jiang Fenfen; China | 27.46 PB |
| T38 | Sophie Hahn; Great Britain | 25.92 WR | Luca Ekler; Hungary | 26.61 PB | Rhiannon Clarke; Australia | 26.79 AR |
| T47 | Deja Young; United States | 24.47 CR | Anrune Weyers; South Africa | 25.01 AR | Lisbeli Vera Andrade; Venezuela | 25.08 PB |
| T64 | Irmgard Bensusan; Germany | 26.93 CR | Kimberly Alkemade; Netherlands | 26.98 PB | Femita Ayanbeku; United States | 28.21 SB |
WR world record | AR area record | CR championship record | GR games record | NR national record | OR Olympic record | PB personal best | SB season best | WL world leading (in a given season)

== See also ==
- List of IPC world records in athletics
