= 2017 World Para Athletics Championships – Women's 200 metres =

The women's 200 metres at the 2017 World Para Athletics Championships was held at the Olympic Stadium in London from 14 to 23 July.

== Medalists ==
| Event | Gold | | Silver | | Bronze | |
|---|---|---|---|---|---|---|
| T11 | Zhou Guohua; Guide: Jia Dengpu; China | 25.27 | Liu Cuiqing; Guide: Xu Donglin; China | 25.65 | Esperanca Gicasso; Guide: Nicolau Ernesto Palanca; Angola | 27.22 |
| T12 | Omara Durand; Guide: Yuniol Kindelan; Cuba | 23.58 | Katrin Mueller-Rottgardt; Guide: Noel-Philippe Fiener; Germany | 24.82 SB | Malgorzata Ignasiak; Poland | 26.97 |
| T13 | Leilia Adzhametova; Ukraine | 24.63 AR | Ilse Hayes; South Africa | 24.94 SB | Kym Crosby; United States | 25.21 PB |
| T35 | Isis Holt; Australia | 28.47 CR | Zhou Xia; China | 28.64 | Maria Lyle; Great Britain | 29.87 SB |
| T36 | Shi Yiting; China | 28.92 CR | Yanina Andrea Martinez; Argentina | 30.70 | Jeon Min-Jae; South Korea | 31.40 |
| T37 | Nataliia Kobzar; Ukraine | 27.62 CR | Mandy Francois-Elie; Germany | 28.04 PB | Jaleen Roberts; United States | 28.18 AR |
| T38 | Sophie Hahn; Great Britain | 26.11 WR | Lindy Ave; Germany | 27.02 PB | Kadeena Cox; Great Britain | 27.15 PB |
| T44 | Marlou van Rhijn; Netherlands | 26.02 CR | Irmgard Bensusan; Germany | 27.13 CR | Sara Andrés Barrio; Spain | 27.33 PB |
| T47 | Deja Young; United States | 25.10 SB | Anrune Liebenberg; South Africa | 25.53 AR | Li Lu; China | 25.71 PB |
| T53 | Samantha Kinghorn; Great Britain | 28.61 WR | Angela Ballard; Australia | 29.09 | Hamide Kurt; Turkey | 30.02 PB |
| T54 | Tatyana McFadden; United States | 28.08 CR | Cheri Madsen; United States | 28.89 | Hannah McFadden; United States | 29.49 |
WR world record | AR area record | CR championship record | GR games record | NR national record | OR Olympic record | PB personal best | SB season best | WL world leading (in a given season)

Events listed in pink were contested but no medals were awarded.

== See also ==
- List of IPC world records in athletics
