= Athletics at the 2024 Summer Paralympics – Women's 400 metres T53 =

Women's 400 metres T53 at the XVII Paralympic Games
- Venue: Stade de France
- Dates: 5 September 2024
- Competitors: 8 from 7 nations
- Winning time: 51.60 PR

Medalists
1st place, gold medalist(s)		Catherine Debrunner	Switzerland
2nd place, silver medalist(s)		Samantha Kinghorn	Great Britain
3rd place, bronze medalist(s)		Zhou Hongzhuan	China

400 metres at the 2024 Summer Paralympics
Men · T11 · T12 · T13 · T20 · T36 · T37 · T38 · T47 · T52 · T53 · T54 · T62
Women · T11 · T12 · T13 · T20 · T37 · T38 · T47 · T53 · T54 ·

The women's 400 metres T53 event at the 2024 Summer Paralympics in Paris, took place on 5 September 2024.

The T53 category is for wheelchair athletes with normal use of arms and hands, no or limited trunk function, and no leg function.

== Records ==
Prior to the competition, the existing records were as follows:

World Record	Catherine Debrunner (SUI)	49.43	(France) Paris	14 June 2024
Paralympic Record	Zhou Hongzhuan (CHN)	54.43	(Brazil) Rio de Janeiro	11 September 2016

Area	Time		Athlete	Location	Date
Africa	1:02.85		(Kenya) Anne Wafula	(Greece) Athens	25 September 2004
America	53.32		(United States) Chelsea McClammer	(Switzerland) Arbon	25 May 2017
Asia	53.62		(China) Zhou Hongzhuan	(France) Paris	15 July 2023
Europe	49.63	WR	(Switzerland) Catherine Debrunner	(France) Paris	14 June 2024
Oceania	54.55		(Australia) Angela Ballard	(Switzerland) Arbon	30 May 2019

== Results ==
=== Final ===
Rank	Lane	Athlete	Nation	Time	Notes
1st place, gold medalist(s)	5	Catherine Debrunner	Switzerland	51.60	PR
2nd place, silver medalist(s)	6	Samantha Kinghorn	Great Britain	53.45	
3rd place, bronze medalist(s)	7	Zhou Hongzhuan	China	55.09	
4	8	Gao Fang	China	56.53	
5	4	Hamide Dogangun	Turkey	56.90	SB
6	9	Angela Ballard	Australia	59.12	
7	3	Jessica Cooper Lewis	Bermuda	1:00.82	
8	2	Chelsea Stein	United States	1:06.47	
