= 2019 World Para Athletics Championships – Women's 400 metres =

The women's 400 metres at the 2019 World Para Athletics Championships was held in Dubai 7–15 November.

== Medalists ==
Event	Gold		Silver		Bronze	
T11	Thalita Vitória Simplício da Silva; Brazil	56.85 PB	Liu Cuiqing; China	58.19	Suneeporn Tanomwong; Thailand	1:00.69 PB
T12	Omara Durand; Cuba	52.85	Oksana Boturchuk; Ukraine	56.02	Greilyz Villarroel; Venezuela	58.66
T13	Rayane Soares da Silva; Brazil	57.30 PB	Carolina Duarte; Portugal	57.46	Leilia Adzhametova; Ukraine	57.55
T20	Breanna Clark; United States	56.35 SB	Yuliia Shuliar; Ukraine	58.04 PB	Carina Paim; Portugal	59.15
T37	Nataliia Kobzar; Ukraine	1:02.44 PB	Jiang Fenfen; China	1:02.90 AR	Sheryl James; South Africa	1:06.06
T38	Margarita Goncharova; Russia	1:02.08 CR	Kadeena Cox; United Kingdom	1:02.20 SB	Sonia Mansour; Tunisia	1:03.96 AR
T47	Anrune Weyers; South Africa	55.79 CR	Li Lu; China	58.61	Lisbeli Vera Andrade; Venezuela	58.98 PB
T53	Catherine Debrunner; Switzerland	56.74	Zhou Hongzhuan; China	57.65	Hamide Dogangun; Turkey	58.02
T54	Zou Lihong; China	53.28	Amanda McGrory; United States	54.85	Eliza Ault-Connell; Australia	55.30

== See also ==
- List of IPC world records in athletics
