= Athletics at the 2024 Summer Paralympics – Mixed 4 × 100 metres relay =

Mixed 4 × 100 metres relay at the XVII Paralympic Games
- Venue: Stade de France
- Dates: 6 September 2024
- Competitors: 20 from 5 nations

Medalists
1st place, gold medalist(s)		Zhou Guohua; Hao Wang; Wen Xiaoyan; Hu Yang	China
2nd place, silver medalist(s)		Zachary Shaw; Jonnie Peacock; Ali Smith; Samantha Kinghorn	Great Britain
3rd place, bronze medalist(s)		Noah Malone; Hunter Woodhall; Taylor Swanson; Tatyana McFadden	United States

The mixed 4 × 100 metres relay event, also called the Universal 4 x 100 metre relay at the 2024 Summer Paralympics in Stade de France, Paris, both heats and finals, took place on 6 September 2024.

== Records ==
Prior to the competition, the existing records were as follows:

World Record	United States	45.52	Tokyo (Japan)	3 September 2021
Paralympic Games Record	United States	45.52	Tokyo (Japan)	3 September 2021

== Results ==
As T11 and T12 athletes were eligible for this event, a maximum of four teams could take part in each race, necessitating heats. The four fastest teams across all heats qualified for the final.

=== Heats ===
Heat 1

Rank	Team	Nationality	Lane	Result	Notes
1	China (CHN)	Zhou Guohua; Hao Wang; Wen Xiaoyan; Hu Yang	5	45.09	q WR
2	Great Britain (GBR)	Zachary Shaw; Jonnie Peacock; Ali Smith; Samantha Kinghorn	7	46.61	q AR

Heat 2

Rank	Team	Nationality	Lane	Result	Notes
1	United States (USA)	Noah Malone; Korban Best; Taylor Swanson; Tatyana McFadden	5	46.39	q SB
2	Japan (JPN)	Uran Sawada; Sae Tsuji; Takeru Matsumoto; Tomoki Ikoma	3	47.09	q SB
3	Brazil (BRA)	Lorena Salvatini Spoladore; Washington Júnior; Veronica Hipolito; Ariosvaldo Fernandes da Silva	7	51.19	SB

=== Final ===
Rank	Team	Athletes	Lane	Time	Notes
1st place, gold medalist(s)	China (CHN)	Zhou Guohua; Hao Wang; Wen Xiaoyan; Hu Yang	5	45.07	WR
2nd place, silver medalist(s)	Great Britain (GBR)	Zachary Shaw; Jonnie Peacock; Ali Smith; Samantha Kinghorn	7	46.01	AR
3rd place, bronze medalist(s)	United States (USA)	Noah Malone; Hunter Woodhall; Taylor Swanson; Tatyana McFadden	3	47.32	
4	Japan (JPN)	Uran Sawada; Sae Tsuji; Takeru Matsumoto; Tomoki Ikoma	1	48.16	
