= Athletics at the 2024 Summer Paralympics – Women's 400 metres T12 =

Women's 400 metres T12 at the XVII Paralympic Games
- Venue: Stade de France
- Dates: 2 September 2024 (round 1 & semi-finals); 3 September 2024 (final)
- Winning time: 53.59

Medalists
1st place, gold medalist(s)		Omara Durand; Guide: Yuniol Kindelan Vargas	Cuba
2nd place, silver medalist(s)		Hajar Safarzadeh	Iran
3rd place, bronze medalist(s)		Oksana Boturchuk; Guide: Mykyta Barabanov	Ukraine

400 metres at the 2024 Summer Paralympics
Men · T11 · T12 · T13 · T20 · T36 · T37 · T38 · T47 · T52 · T53 · T54 · T62
Women · T11 · T12 · T13 · T20 · T37 · T38 · T47 · T53 · T54 ·

The women's 400 metres T12 event at the 2024 Summer Paralympics in Paris, took place on 2 and 3 September 2024.

The T12 category is for athletes with visual impairment. Athletes in this category will generally have some residual sight, the ability to recognise the shape of a hand at a distance of 2 metres and the ability to perceive clearly will be no more than 2/60. T12 athletes commonly run with guides.

== Records ==
Prior to the competition, the existing records were as follows:

World Record	Omara Durand (CUB)	51.77	(Brazil) Rio de Janeiro	17 September 2016
Paralympic Record	Omara Durand (CUB)	51.77	(Brazil) Rio de Janeiro	17 September 2016

Area	Time		Athlete	Location	Date
Africa	53.89		(Mozambique) Edmilsa Governo	(Brazil) Rio de Janeiro	17 September 2016
America	51.77	WR	(Cuba) Omara Durand	(Brazil) Rio de Janeiro	17 September 2016
Asia	57.56		(Iran) Hajar Safarzadeh	(Japan) Kobe	21 May 2024
Europe	53.14		(Ukraine) Oksana Boturchuk	(Brazil) Rio de Janeiro	17 September 2016
Oceania	Vacant				

== Results ==
=== Round 1 ===
First in each heat (Q) and the next 4 fastest (q) advance to the semi-finals.

==== Heat 1 ====
Rank	Lane	Athlete	Nation	Time	Notes
1	3	Oksana Boturchuk; Guide: Mykyta Barabanov	Ukraine	58.22	Q
2	7	Clara Barros; Guide: Efraim Andrade	Brazil	58.77	q
—	5	Yokutkhon Kholbekova	Uzbekistan	DNS	

==== Heat 2 ====
Rank	Lane	Athlete	Nation	Time	Notes
1	5	Hajar Safarzadeh	Iran	56.34	Q, AR
2	7	Lorraine Gomes de Aguiar; Guide:	Brazil	59.99	
3	3	Maldonado Velasco; Guide: Cesar Daniel Belman Ortiz	Mexico	1:04.88	
—	1	Sara Martinez; Guide: Jaime del Rio Ruiz	Spain	DNS	

==== Heat 3 ====
Rank	Lane	Athlete	Nation	Time	Notes
1	7	Omara Durand; Guide: Yuniol Kindelan Vargas	Cuba	55.36	Q, SB
2	5	Anna Kulinich-Sorokina; Guide: Illia Goncharov	Neutral Paralympic Athletes	57.26	q, PB
3	3	Ketyla Teodoro; Guide: Rodrigo Arcanjo	Brazil	58.86	q, SB

==== Heat 4 ====
Rank	Lane	Athlete	Nation	Time	Notes
1	3	Alejandra Paola Pérez López; Guide: Markinzon Manzanilla Velasquez	Venezuela	56.97	Q, SB
2	7	Valentina Petrillo	Italy	58.35	q
3	5	Shen Yaqin; Guide: Li Wen	China	1:01.11	

=== Semi-finals ===
First in each heat (Q) and the next 2 fastest (q) advance to the final.

==== Heat 1 ====
Rank	Lane	Athlete	Nation	Time	Notes
1	5	Omara Durand; Guide: Yuniol Kindelan Vargas	Cuba	54.77	Q, SB
2	3	Oksana Boturchuk; Guide: Mykyta Barabanov	Ukraine	56.30	q, SB
3	7	Anna Kulinich-Sorokina; Guide: Illia Goncharov	Neutral Paralympic Athletes	56.55	
4	1	Ketyla Teodoro; Guide: Rodrigo Arcanjo	Brazil	58.94	

==== Heat 2 ====
Rank	Lane	Athlete	Nation	Time	Notes
1	5	Hajar Safarzadeh	Iran	56.07	Q, AR
2	3	Alejandra Paola Pérez López; Guide: Markinzon Manzanilla Velasquez	Venezuela	56.34	q, PB
3	7	Valentina Petrillo	Italy	57.58	PB
4	1	Clara Barros; Guide: Efraim Andrade	Brazil	59.07	

=== Final ===
Rank	Lane	Athlete	Nation	Time	Notes
1st place, gold medalist(s)	5	Omara Durand; Guide: Yuniol Kindelan Vargas	Cuba	53.59	SB
2nd place, silver medalist(s)	3	Hajar Safarzadeh	Iran	55.39	AR
3rd place, bronze medalist(s)	7	Oksana Boturchuk; Guide: Mykyta Barabanov	Ukraine	55.67	SB
4	1	Alejandra Paola Pérez López; Guide: Markinzon Manzanilla Velasquez	Venezuela	56.64	
