= Taylor Swanson =

American Paralympic sprinter (born 1992)

Personal information
- Born: October 24, 1992 (age 34) South Korea
- Home town: Spokane, Washington, U.S.

Sport
- Sport: Para athletics
- Disability: Cerebral palsy
- Disability class: T37
- Event: Sprints
Medal record
Women's para athletics
Representing the United States
Paralympic Games
Silver medal – second place	2024 Paris	100 m T37
Bronze medal – third place	2024 Paris	mixed 4×100 m relay
World Championships
Silver medal – second place	2024 Kobe	100 m T37
Silver medal – second place	2024 Kobe	200 m T37
Silver medal – second place	2025 New Delhi	100 m T37
Bronze medal – third place	2025 New Delhi	200 m T37
Parapan American Games
Silver medal – second place	2023 Santiago	100 m T37
Silver medal – second place	2023 Santiago	200 m T37

Taylor Swanson (born October 24, 1992) is an American T37 Paralympic sprint runner.

== Early life ==
Swanson joined the track team at Roosevelt High School in Roosevelt, Seattle during her freshman year. She competed in the AAU Junior Olympics her junior year, and qualified for the state meet as a senior. She then attended Arizona State University. During her time in college, she continued to compete as a sprinter for the Seattle Speed Track Club. In 2014, she tore the meniscus in her right knee. Complications arose during her initial knee surgery, and two more surgeries were required. She also underwent extensive physical therapy with little to no improvement. In 2022, following the advice of her physical therapist, she began training as a Para sprinter. She moved to Spokane, Washington in 2023 to train with ParaSport Spokane, an organization governed by US Paralympic Track and Field.

== Career ==
Swanson was officially classified as a T37 athlete in June 2023. In September of that year, Swanson raced in the Diamond League Prefontaine Classic at the University of Oregon’s Hayward Field, where she finished fourth in the Para 100 meter (a race which combines multiple classifications into one event).

Swanson made her international debut for the United States at the 2023 Parapan American Games. She won silvers medal in the 100 meter and 200 meter T37 events.

On March 18, 2024, Swanson was selected to represent the United States at the 2024 World Para Athletics Championships. She won a silver medal in the 100 meter T37 event with a personal-best time of 12.86 seconds. She also won a silver medal in the 200 meter T37 event with a personal-best time of 26.89 seconds.

In August and September 2024, Swanson made her Paralympic debut in the Paris Olympic & Paralympic Games. She won a silver medal in the 100 meter T37, and a bronze medal in the 4x100m Universal Relay.

== Personal life ==
Swanson was born in South Korea and was adopted at six months old by Brian Swanson and Stacy Walker and raised in the United States. At age two, she was diagnosed with a phonological process disorder, which affects language processing. Although she exhibited signs of cerebral palsy growing up, she wasn't officially diagnosed until June 2023 when doctors discovered she had hemiplegia, a type of unilateral cerebral palsy. As a child she struggled academically, but excelled at sports.

In 2023, she appeared on the podcast Embracing the Journey to discuss her personal journey.
