= Athletics at the 2024 Summer Paralympics – Men's 400 metres T52 =

Men's 400 metres T52 at the XVII Paralympic Games
- Venue: Stade de France
- Dates: 30 August 2024
- Competitors: 11 from 7 nations
- Winning time: 55.10

Medalists
1st place, gold medalist(s)		Maxime Carabin	Belgium
2nd place, silver medalist(s)		Tomoki Sato	Japan
3rd place, bronze medalist(s)		Tomoya Ito	Japan

400 metres at the 2024 Summer Paralympics
Men · T11 · T12 · T13 · T20 · T36 · T37 · T38 · T47 · T52 · T53 · T54 · T62
Women · T11 · T12 · T13 · T20 · T37 · T38 · T47 · T53 · T54 ·

The men's 100 metres T52 event at the 2024 Summer Paralympics in Paris, took place on 30 August 2024.

The T52 category is for wheelchair athletes with damage to spinal cord in the higher parts of the back, substantially impaired or no trunk function, and minimal or no leg function. Pushing power comes from elbow extensions, and appears close to normal except for use of modified gloves to compensate for grip.

== Records ==
Prior to the competition, the existing records were as follows:

World Record	Maxime Carabin (BEL)	52.00	(United Arab Emirates) Sharjah	6 February 2024
Paralympic Record	Tomoki Sato (JPN)	55.39	(Japan) Tokyo	27 August 2021

Area	Time		Athlete	Location	Date
Africa	1:01.93		(Morocco) Abdellah Ez Zine	(Greece) Athens	22 September 2004
America	55.19		(United States) Raymond Martin	(Switzerland) Arbon	4 June 2015
Asia	54.54		(Japan) Tomoki Sato	(Switzerland) Nottwil	9 June 2024
Europe	52.00	WR	(Belgium) Maxime Carabin	(United Arab Emirates) Sharjah	6 June 2024
Oceania	1:05.21		(Australia) Lachlan Jones	(Greece) Athens	21 September 2004

== Results ==
=== Round 1 ===
First 3 in each heat (Q) and the next 2 fastest (q) advance to the Final.

==== Heat 1 ====
Heat 1 took place on 30 August 2024, at 10:58.

Rank	Lane	Name	Nationality	Time	Notes
1	3	Maxime Carabin	Belgium	54.48	Q, PR
2	5	Fabian Blum	Switzerland	1:04.08	Q
3	4	Salvador Hernández	Mexico	1:05.71	Q
4	6	Jerrold Mangliwan	Philippines	1:05.79	q
5	7	Tatsuya Ito	Japan	1:09.55	

==== Heat 2 ====
Heat 2 took place on 30 August 2024, at 11:05.

Rank	Lane	Name	Nationality	Time	Notes
1	3	Tomoki Sato	Japan	58.04	Q
2	7	Tomoya Ito	Japan	1:00.42	Q
3	4	Leonardo de Jesús Pérez Juárez	Mexico	1:03.14	Q
4	5	Anthony Bouchard	Canada	1:05.98	q
5	6	Beat Bösch	Switzerland	1:06.65	
6	8	Sam McIntosh	Australia	1:10.33	

=== Final ===
Final took place on 30 August 2024, at 19:12.

Rank	Lane	Name	Nationality	Time	Notes
1st place, gold medalist(s)	5	Maxime Carabin	Belgium	55.10	
2nd place, silver medalist(s)	6	Tomoki Sato	Japan	56.26	
3rd place, bronze medalist(s)	7	Tomoya Ito	Japan	1:01.08	
4	9	Leonardo de Jesús Pérez Juárez	Mexico	1:03.43	
5	8	Fabian Blum	Switzerland	1:03.71	
6	2	Anthony Bouchard	Canada	1:04.09	
7	4	Salvador Hernández	Mexico	1:04.32	
8	3	Jerrold Mangliwan	Philippines	1:04.55	
