= Wen Xiaoyan =

Chinese Paralympic athlete (born 1997)

Personal information
- Born: 12 October 1997 (age 28)

Sport
- Country: China
- Sport: Para-athletics
- Disability class: T37
- Events: 100 metres; 200 metres; 400 metres; Long jump; Relay race
Medal record
Women's para athletics
Representing China
Paralympic Games
Gold medal – first place	2016 Rio de Janeiro	Long jump T37
Gold medal – first place	2016 Rio de Janeiro	4×100 m T35-T38
Gold medal – first place	2020 Tokyo	100 m T37
Gold medal – first place	2020 Tokyo	200 m T37
Gold medal – first place	2020 Tokyo	Long jump T37
Gold medal – first place	2024 Paris	100 m T37
Gold medal – first place	2024 Paris	200 m T37
Gold medal – first place	2024 Paris	mixed 4×100 m relay
Gold medal – first place	2024 Paris	Long jump T37
Silver medal – second place	2016 Rio de Janeiro	400 m T37
World Championships
Gold medal – first place	2017 London	Long jump T37
Gold medal – first place	2019 Dubai	100 m T37
Gold medal – first place	2019 Dubai	200 m T37
Gold medal – first place	2019 Dubai	Long jump T37
Gold medal – first place	2023 Paris	Long jump T37
Gold medal – first place	2024 Kobe	100 m T37
Gold medal – first place	2024 Kobe	200 m T37
Gold medal – first place	2025 New Delhi	Long jump T37
Gold medal – first place	2025 New Delhi	100 m T37
Gold medal – first place	2025 New Delhi	200 m T37
Silver medal – second place	2019 Dubai	4x100 m relay
Silver medal – second place	2023 Paris	200 m T37
Bronze medal – third place	2023 Paris	100 m T37
Asian Para Games
Gold medal – first place	2022 Hangzhou	100 m T37
Gold medal – first place	2022 Hangzhou	200 m T37

Wen Xiaoyan (born 12 October 1997) is a Chinese Paralympic athlete. She represented China at the 2016 Summer Paralympics and she won two gold medals and one silver medal. She also won three gold medals at the 2020 Summer Paralympics held in Tokyo, Japan.

== Career ==
Wen won the gold medal in the women's long jump T37 event and the silver medal in the women's 400 metres T37 event. In the women's 4 × 100 metres relay T35-T38 event she won the gold medal together with Jiang Fenfen, Chen Junfei and Li Yingli.

At the 2017 World Para Athletics Championships held in London, United Kingdom, Wen won the gold medal in the women's long jump T37 event. Two years later at the 2019 World Para Athletics Championships held in Dubai, United Arab Emirates she won three gold medals and one silver medal. She won the gold medal in the women's 100 metres T37, women's 200 metres T37 and women's long jump T37 events. She also won the silver medal in the 4 x 100 metres relay event.

Wen won the gold medal in the 200 metres T37 event at the 2020 Summer Paralympics held in Tokyo, Japan. She won the gold medal in the 100 metres T37 event with a world record of 13.00. She also won the gold medal in the long jump T37 event.
