= Shen Yaqin =

Chinese Paralympic athlete

Personal information
- Nationality: Chinese
- Born: 11 December 1990 (age 35) China

Sport
- Country: China
- Sport: Athletics
- Disability class: T12
- Event(s): sprint long jump
Medal record
Paralympic athletics
Representing China
Paralympic Games
| Gold medal – first place | 2016 Rio | 4 × 100 m – T11-13 |
World Championships
| Bronze medal – third place | 2025 New Delhi | 200 m T12 |
Asian Para Games
| Bronze medal – third place | 2022 Hangzhou | 100 m T12 |
| Bronze medal – third place | 2022 Hangzhou | 200 m T12 |

Shen Yaqin (born 11 December 1990) is a visually impaired Paralympian athlete from China competing mainly in T12 classification events.

== Career ==
Shen won a gold medal at her first Summer Paralympics, the 2016 Rio Games, in the women's 4 × 100 metres relay.
