= Hajar Safarzadeh =

Iranian para-athlete (born 2000)

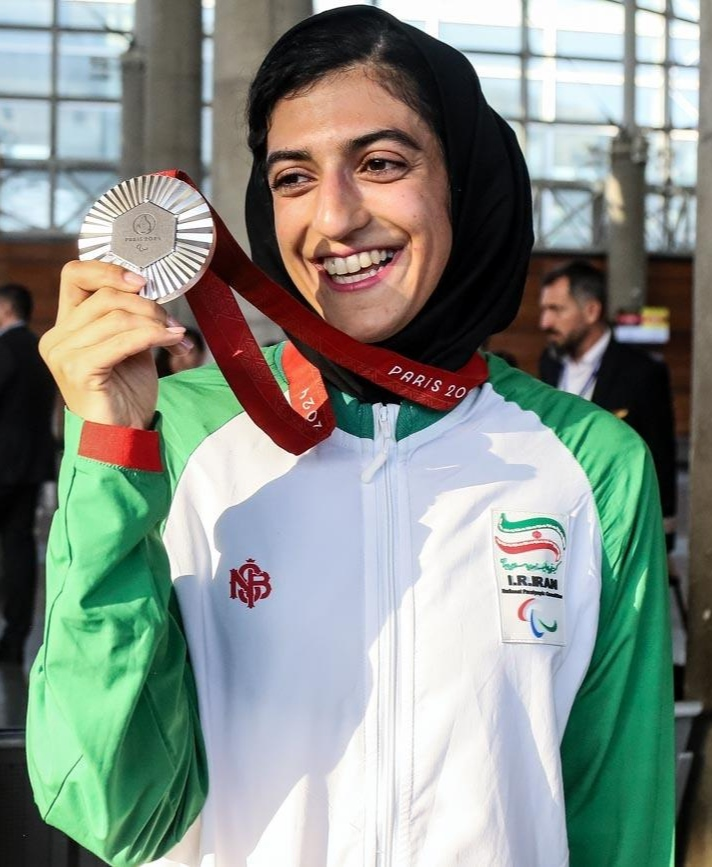
- Safarzadeh in 2024

Personal information
- Native name: هاجر صفرزاده
- Born: 14 March 2000 (age 26)

Sport
- Country: Iran
- Sport: Para-athletics
- Disability class: T12
Medal record
Women's para-athletics
Representing Iran
Paralympic Games
Silver medal – second place	2024 Paris	400 m T12
World Championships
Silver medal – second place	2025 New Delhi	400 m T12
Asian Para Games
Silver medal – second place	2026 Aichi–Nagoya	200 m T12

Hajar Safarzadeh Ghahderijani (Persian: هاجر صفرزاده; born 14 March 2000) is an Iranian para-athlete. She competed at the 2024 Summer Paralympics, winning the silver medal in the women's 400 m T12 event.
