= Jaleen Roberts =

American track and field athlete (born 1998)

Personal information
- Born: November 19, 1998 (age 27) Tacoma, Washington, U.S.
- Home town: Kent, Washington, U.S.
- Education: Eastern Washington University
- Height: 5 ft 5 in (165 cm)

Sport
- Country: United States
- Disability: Cerebral palsy
- Disability class: T37
Medal record
Women's para athletics
Representing the United States
Paralympic Games
Silver medal – second place	2020 Tokyo	100 m T37
Silver medal – second place	2020 Tokyo	Long jump T37
Silver medal – second place	2024 Paris	Long jump T37
Bronze medal – third place	2024 Paris	100 m T37
World Championships
Silver medal – second place	2017 London	Long jump T37
Silver medal – second place	2019 Dubai	Long jump T37
Silver medal – second place	2023 Paris	100 m T37
Bronze medal – third place	2017 London	100 m T37
Bronze medal – third place	2017 London	200 m T37
Bronze medal – third place	2023 Paris	200 m T37
Bronze medal – third place	2025 New Delhi	Long jump T37

Jaleen Roberts (born November 19, 1998) is an American track and field athlete. Born with cerebral palsy, she has won medals for Team USA at the 2017 World Para Athletics Championships, 2019 Parapan American Games, and 2019 World Para Athletics Championships.

== Early life and education ==
Roberts was born on November 19, 1998, in Tacoma, Washington. Although she was born with cerebral palsy, Roberts competed in soccer, wrestling, gymnastics and track growing up. While attending Mill Creek Middle School and Kent-Meridian High School, Roberts competed in wrestling, gymnastics, basketball and track. She decided to stick with wrestling and track in high school, where she qualified for the state wrestling tournament in both her junior and senior years. At a state-level track meet, Jaleen Roberts met her current coach David Greig, the development director and head coach for track and field at ParaSport Spokane. David Greig had been a coach for female cerebral palsy athletes for twenty years and was very impressed by Jaleen Roberts running style. By the conclusion of her high school career, Roberts was the co-recipient of Female Field Athlete of the Year with Jessica Heims.

== After high school ==
After finishing high school, Jaleen Roberts moved to Spokane, Washington to continue training with David Greig. Roberts has said that leaving her family, including her mother and her brothers and sisters, was a very difficult decision. Roberts moved to Spokane to train with David Grieg, and began attending Eastern Washington University due to its proximity to Spokane. She studied Health and Physical Education to become a physical education teacher, completing her degree in December 2021. As a student, she competed with the United States National Team at the 2017 World Para Athletics Championships.

== Career ==
Roberts earned two bronze medals in the Women's 100 metres and Women's 200 metres, and silver in the Women's long jump. Her time of 28.28 for the 200 meters set a United States record.

At the 2019 World Para Athletics Championships, she again earned a silver medal in the long jump. Roberts also qualified for the 2019 Parapan American Games where she earned four gold medals and set two record times. As a result of her athleticism, she was named to the United States 2020 Paralympics Track and Field National Team.

== Personal life ==
Roberts is bisexual. She is diagnosed with bipolar type II and has spoken about her struggles with mental health.
