= Ali Smith (athlete) =

British Paralympic athlete

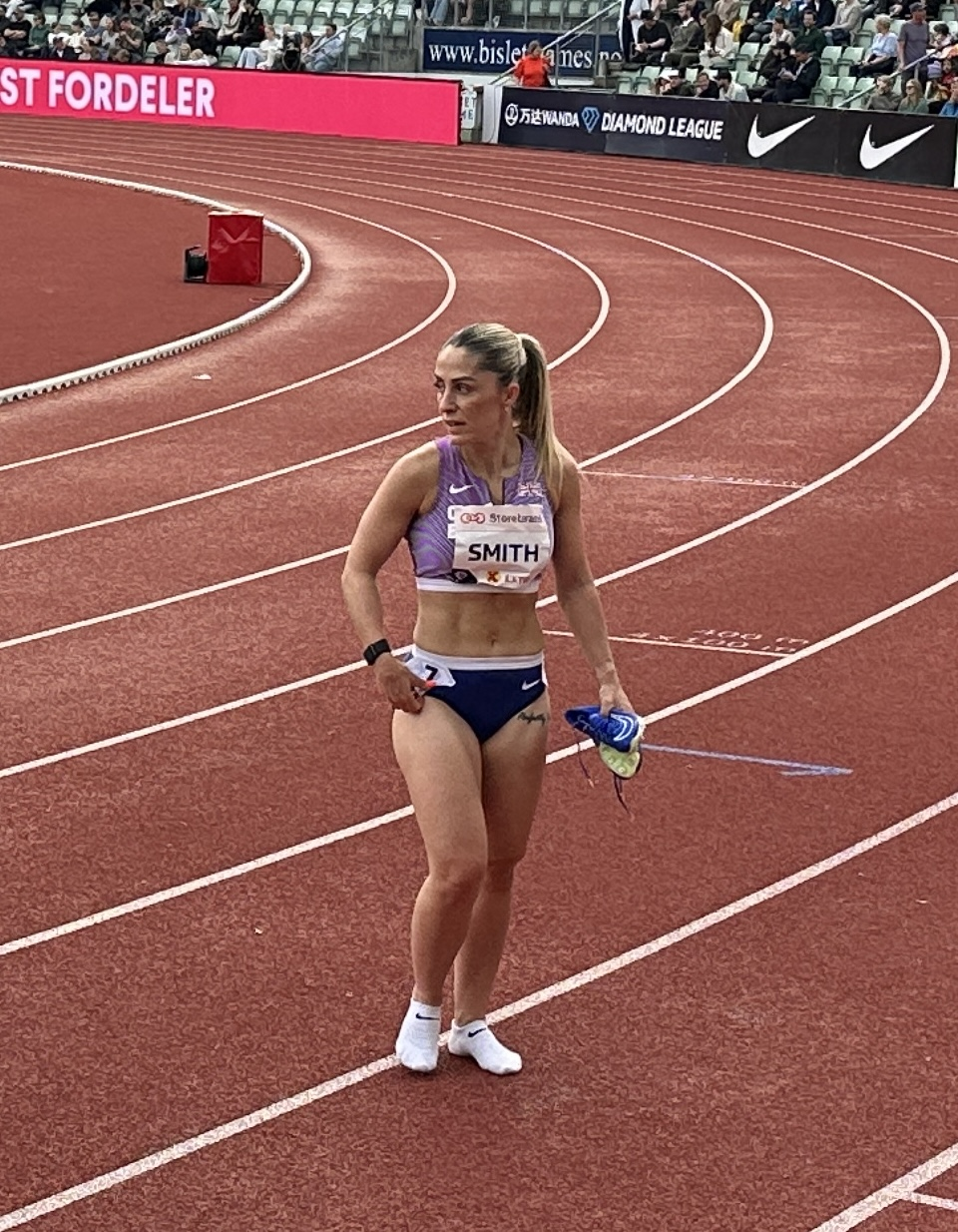
- Bislett Games 2024

Personal information
- Nationality: United Kingdom
- Born: 13 December 1988 (age 37) Chester, England
- Height: 157 cm (5 ft 2 in)

Sport
- Country: United Kingdom
- Sport: Paralympic athletics
- Disability: Multiple sclerosis
- Disability class: T38
- Events: 100 metres, 400 metres, 4X100m Universal Relay
- Club: Guildford & Godalming Athletic Club
- Coached by: Benke Blomkvist
Medal record
Women's para athletics
Representing United Kingdom
Paralympic Games
Silver medal – second place	2020 Tokyo	mixed 4×100 m relay
Silver medal – second place	2024 Paris	mixed 4×100 m relay
World Championships
Silver medal – second place	2024 Kobe	Universal 4 × 100 m relay
European Championships
Silver medal – second place	2018 Berlin	Women's 400m T38
Bronze medal – third place	2021 Bydgoszcz	Women's 400m T38
National Championships
Silver medal – second place	2021 Manchester	100m ambulant
Silver medal – second place	2022 Manchester	100m ambulant
Bronze medal – third place	2020 Manchester	100m ambulant
Silver medal – second place	2023 Birmingham	60m ambulant

Ali Smith (born 13 December 1988) is a British Paralympic athlete who competes in 100 metres, 400 metres, and 4x100m Universal Relay events. At the age of 25, Ali was diagnosed with multiple sclerosis after noticing she was having abnormal symptoms. In 2017, she picked up para-athletics after loving track and field as a child before her disability.

Smith, a two-time Paralympian, was selected for both the 2020 Summer Paralympics in Tokyo and the 2024 Summer Paralympics in Paris.

== Career ==
Smith's sporting career started in her teens, where she competed in professional show jumping. This profession took her from her hometown, Knutsford, to Surrey so she could pursue her dreams. When she was diagnosed with multiple sclerosis, it made it increasingly difficult to pursue this passion.

After impressing in para-athletics events, she was soon invited to major events. She competed in the 60m at Glasgow Indoor Grand Prix in 2018. Later that year, she got her first Great Britain call up where Smith took the silver medal in the T38 400m event of the 2018 World Para Athletics European Championships in Berlin, Germany.

She won the bronze medal in the 400m T38 event of the 2021 World Para Athletics European Championships in Bydgoszcz, Poland. She came second in the 100 metres mixed class event at the 2021 British Athletics Championships.

Smith was selected to compete at the 2020 Summer Paralympics. She was part of the Great Britain 4X100m Universal Relay which won a silver medal in Tokyo. She shared the podium with Libby Clegg, Jonnie Peacock, and Nathan Maguire. This topped off a successful Games where she finished 8th in the T38 100m and T38 400m.

Smith took momentum into the following year as she was part of the England team and the 2022 Commonwealth Games in Birmingham. She agonisingly missed out on the podium by finished 4th in the T37/38 100m behind fellow British athlete Olivia Breen and Sophie Hahn.

In 2023, Smith qualified for the 2023 World Para Athletics Championships after recording personal bests of 12.94s in the 100m at Lee Valley in London, and 62.31s in the 400m at Nuneaton. After qualifying for the T38 100m final, she was unfortunately hospitalised after a severe multiple sclerosis relapse which brought her season to an end.

She was able to bounce back the following year by being called up to represent Great Britain at the 2024 World Para Athletics Championships in Kobe, Japan. She was nominated as co-captain alongside her teammate Zac Shaw. She replicated her success at the 2020 Summer Paralympics by winning another silver medal in the 4 × 100 m Universal Relay in a star studded team alongside Hannah Cockroft Kevin Santos and Zac Shaw.

Smith was selected in the 33 strong Para-athletics team for Great Britain at the 2024 Summer Paralympics in Paris, France, competing in the T38 400m and the 4 × 100 m universal relay.

In the 400m she came in 6th place. In the universal relay, alongside Zac Shaw, Jonnie Peacock and Sammi Kinghorn, she won the silver medal behind China.

Alongside her sport, she works as the finance manager for British Wheelchair Basketball. She is also a trustee for Personal Best Foundation (founded by England Athletics ).
