= Małgorzata Ignasiak =

Polish Paralympic sprinter

Personal information
- Nickname: Gosia
- Born: 18 January 1995 (age 31) Ostrów Wielkopolski, Poland
- Education: Poznan University of Technology

Sport
- Country: Poland
- Sport: Paralympic athletics
- Disability: Cone-rod dystrophy
- Disability class: T12
- Event(s): 100 metres 200 metres
- Club: SSR Start Poznan/ OS AZS Poznań
- Coached by: Robert Rejewski
Medal record
Paralympic athletics
Representing Poland
World Championships
| Bronze medal – third place | 2017 London | Women's 100m T12 |
| Bronze medal – third place | 2017 London | Women's 100m T12 |
European Championships
| Bronze medal – third place | 2016 Grosseto | Women's 200m T12 |
| Bronze medal – third place | 2018 Berlin | Women's 100m T12 |
| Bronze medal – third place | 2018 Berlin | Women's 200m T12 |

Małgorzata Ignasiak (born 18 January 1995) is a Polish Paralympic athlete who competes in sprinting events in international level events. She is one of few T12 categorised athletes to run without a running guide.
