= Norma Salinas Revilla =

Peruvian biologist and professor

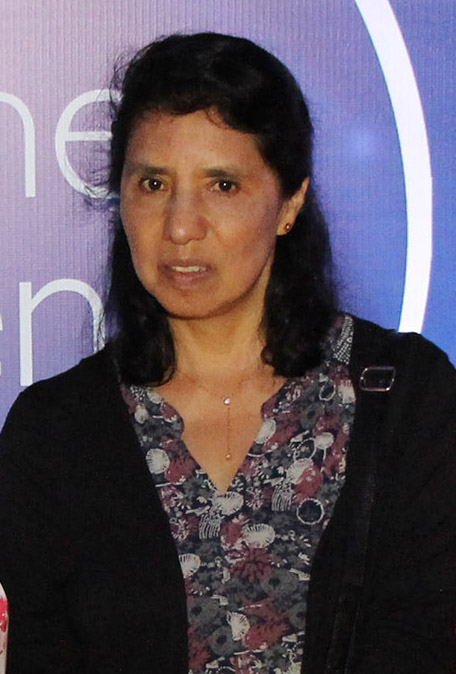
- Born: 1977 (age 48–49); Cusco, Peru

Academic work
- Discipline: Biology
- Institutions: Pontifical Catholic University of Peru
- Main interests: Tropical forest ecology

Norma Salinas Revilla (Cusco, 1977) is a Peruvian biologist and professor at the Pontifical Catholic University of Peru (PUCP) She received a L'Oréal-UNESCO For Women in Science Award in 2016. Her research in Peru contributed to the establishment of the Megantoni National Sanctuary. Additionally, she co-discovered two orchid species, Maxillaria machupicchuensis Christenson & Salinas and Brachionidium machupicchuense Salinas & Christenson. Her work focus on the understanding and protection of tropical forest ecology and the impacts of global changes on Andean-Amazonian ecosystems.

== Early life and education ==
Salinas was educated at the National University of San Antonio Abad in Cusco, where she received her Bachelor's degree in biology. She earned a Master's in Environmental Management and Development from the Latin American Faculty of Social Sciences (FLACSO) in Costa Rica, followed by a Ph.D. in geography and the Environment from the University of Oxford, UK.

== Career ==
Salinas's research has been considered on the establishment of protected areas in the Amazon Rainforest and in understanding climate change's effects on tropical forests. One of her contributions led to the establishment of the Megantoni National Sanctuary in Cusco. Moreover, she has described new species for science, including orchids like Maxillaria machupicchuensis and Brachionidium machupicchuense, showcasing her expertise in biodiversity.

At PUCP, she developed research with the Institute of Nature, Earth, and Energy, where she has been leading ecosystem science studies for over two decades. Her work includes the coordination of a network of plots for tree inventory in Manu National Park, which serves as a natural laboratory for studying climate change's impacts on forests. Her research includes monitoring water balances using wireless sensor networks for productivity estimations in Amazonian forests and coastal woody crops. She is also part of the AndesFlux initiative, a network of instrumented towers monitoring the Amazon's eastern Andes across a full latitudinal gradient, examining the region's response to climate change and deforestation. Currently, Norma is conducting a study in Manu National Park to investigate the impacts of climate change on tropical forests. In collaboration with researchers from PUCP, is conducting research at the Los Amigos Biological Station in the Madre de Dios region of southeastern Peru, studying greenhouse gas fluxes to understand the impact of climate change on Amazonian ecosystems.

In addition to her research and teaching roles, Norma Salinas has taken advisory responsibilities in Peru assuming a position of in the Multisectoral Advisory Commission of the Peruvian Ministry of Environment. In this role she contributes to environmental policy and sustainability practices across the nation.

== Awards and honors ==
- L'Oréal-UNESCO For Women in Science Award (2016)

== Legacy ==
Salinas's work has contributed to policies and conservation strategies in Peru and beyond being considered an exemplary figure in for Peruvian scientific community.

Her scholarly output includes over 70 articles, with publications in high-impact journals such as New Phytologist, Frontiers in Plant Science, and IEEE Journal of Selected Topics in Applied Earth Observations and Remote Sensing. Her studies highlight the relationships between vegetation traits and environmental gradients across the Andes-Amazon transition.

Outside the research, Salinas was involved in the theatrical production Nuestra gran aventura en las ciencias in 2018. The play, aimed at encouraging young girls to pursue careers in science, highlights female scientists and demonstrates the possibilities within scientific fields.

== Selected publications ==
Salinas co-authored more than 70 publications, including:

- The sensitivity of tropical leaf litter decomposition to temperature: results from a large‐scale leaf translocation experiment along an elevation gradient in Peruvian forests. (2011). N Salinas, Y Malhi, P Meir, M Silman, R Roman Cuesta, J Huaman, D Salinas, V Huaman, A Gibaja, M Mamani, F Farfan. New phytologist 189 (4), 967-977.
- Tropical montane forests in a changing environment. (2021). N Salinas, EG Cosio, M Silman, P Meir, AT Nottingham, Rosa Maria Roman-Cuesta, Yadvinder Malhi. Frontiers in Plant Science 12, 712748.
- Calibration of the SMAP soil moisture retrieval algorithm to reduce bias over the Amazon rainforest. (2024). K Cho, R Negrón-Juárez, A Colliander, EG Cosio, N Salinas, A de Araujo, Jefferey Q Chambers, Jingfeng Wang. IEEE Journal of Selected Topics in Applied Earth Observations and Remote Sensing.
