= Chelsea Stein =

American wheelchair racer

Personal information
- Born: March 19, 2003 (age 23) China
- Home town: Spring, Texas, U.S.

Sport
- Country: United States
- Sport: Wheelchair racing
- Disability class: T53
Medal record
Parapan American Games
Silver medal – second place	2023 Santiago	100 m T53

Chelsea Stein (born March 19, 2003) is an American wheelchair racer. As of 2024, she is the top ranked woman in the T53 100m.

== Early life and education ==
Stein was born in China with sacral agenesis and spina bifida, for which she underwent surgery at a young age. After spending seven years in foster care, she was adopted by American parents at age 10. Following her adoption, she lived in Spring, Texas, and attended Roth Elementary, Strack Intermediate, and Klein Collins High School.

As of 2024, she attends the University of Arizona, where she is studying nursing and competes on the school's track and road racing team.

== Athletic career ==
As a high schooler, Stein competed twice at the UIL Track and Field State Meet in the 100m and 400m wheelchair races, and in seated shot put. At her second time attending the event in 2021, she won the 100m race, came second in the 400m, and fifth in shot put.

Stein competed in the inaugural women's 100m wheelchair dash at the 2023 National Collegiate Wheelchair Championships. She won a silver medal at the 2023 Parapan American Games in Santiago, Chile.

At the 2024 Paralympic trials, Stein raced in the women's T53 events, with times of 2:13.57 in the 800m, 1:05.71 in the 400m, and 18.28 in the 100m. She was named to the U.S. Paralympic team in early August 2024, after receiving an invitation from the International Paralympic Committee to fill a vacant qualification spot. At the 2024 Summer Paralympics, Stein raced in the 800m and 100m T53, coming last in both finals with times of 2:11.91 and 18.30 respectively.

== Personal life ==
Stein has over 40,000 followers on TikTok.
