= Jiang Fenfen =

Chinese Paralympic athlete (born 1997)

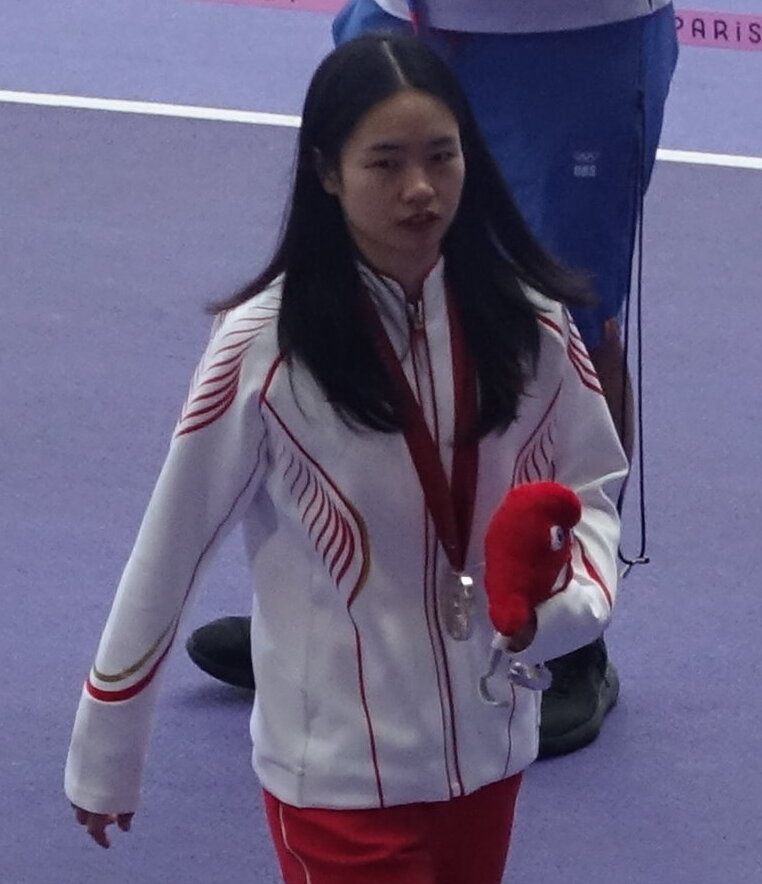
- Jiang at the 2024 Summer Paralympics

Personal information
- Born: 19 September 1997 (age 28) Yongzhou, Hunan, China

Sport
- Country: China
- Sport: Para-athletics
- Disability: Cerebral palsy
- Disability class: T37
Medal record
Paralympic athletics
Representing China
Paralympic Games
| Gold medal – first place | 2016 Rio | 4 × 100 m – T35-38 |
| Gold medal – first place | 2020 Tokyo | 400 m T37 |
| Silver medal – second place | 2020 Tokyo | 200 m T37 |
| Silver medal – second place | 2024 Paris | 400 m T37 |
| Bronze medal – third place | 2020 Tokyo | 100 m T37 |
World Championships
| Gold medal – first place | 2024 Kobe | 400 m T37 |
| Silver medal – second place | 2019 Dubai | 100 m T37 |
| Bronze medal – third place | 2019 Dubai | 200 m T37 |
| Bronze medal – third place | 2019 Dubai | 400 m T37 |
| Bronze medal – third place | 2017 London | 400 m T37 |
| Bronze medal – third place | 2023 Paris | 400 m T37 |
| Bronze medal – third place | 2024 Kobe | 100 m T37 |
| Bronze medal – third place | 2024 Kobe | 200 m T37 |
Asian Para Games
| Gold medal – first place | 2018 Jakarta | 200 m T35 |
| Gold medal – first place | 2018 Jakarta | 400 m T35 |
| Silver medal – second place | 2018 Jakarta | 100 m T35 |
| Silver medal – second place | 2022 Hangzhou | 100 m T37 |
| Silver medal – second place | 2022 Hangzhou | 200 m T37 |
| Silver medal – second place | 2022 Hangzhou | 400 m T37 |

Jiang Fenfen (born 19 September 1997) is a Chinese Paralympic athlete who competes in sprinting events in international level events. She is a Paralympic gold medalist and three-time medalist at the World Para Athletics Championships.

== Career ==
Jiang was born in 1997 and she was brought up in Hunan Province. Her uncle was a PE teacher and he encouraged her to get involved with sport in 2014. She was recruited as China looked for para-athletes and in 2016 she competed at her first international event.

Jiang represented China at the 2016 Summer Paralympics; in the women's 4 × 100 metres relay T35-T38 event she won the gold medal together with Wen Xiaoyan, Chen Junfei and Li Yingli. She won three medals at the 2019 World Para Athletics Championships, having won the silver medal in the women's 100 metres and the bronze medal in the women's 200 metres and women's 400 metres.
