= Neda Bahi =

Tunisian Paralympic athlete (born 1992)

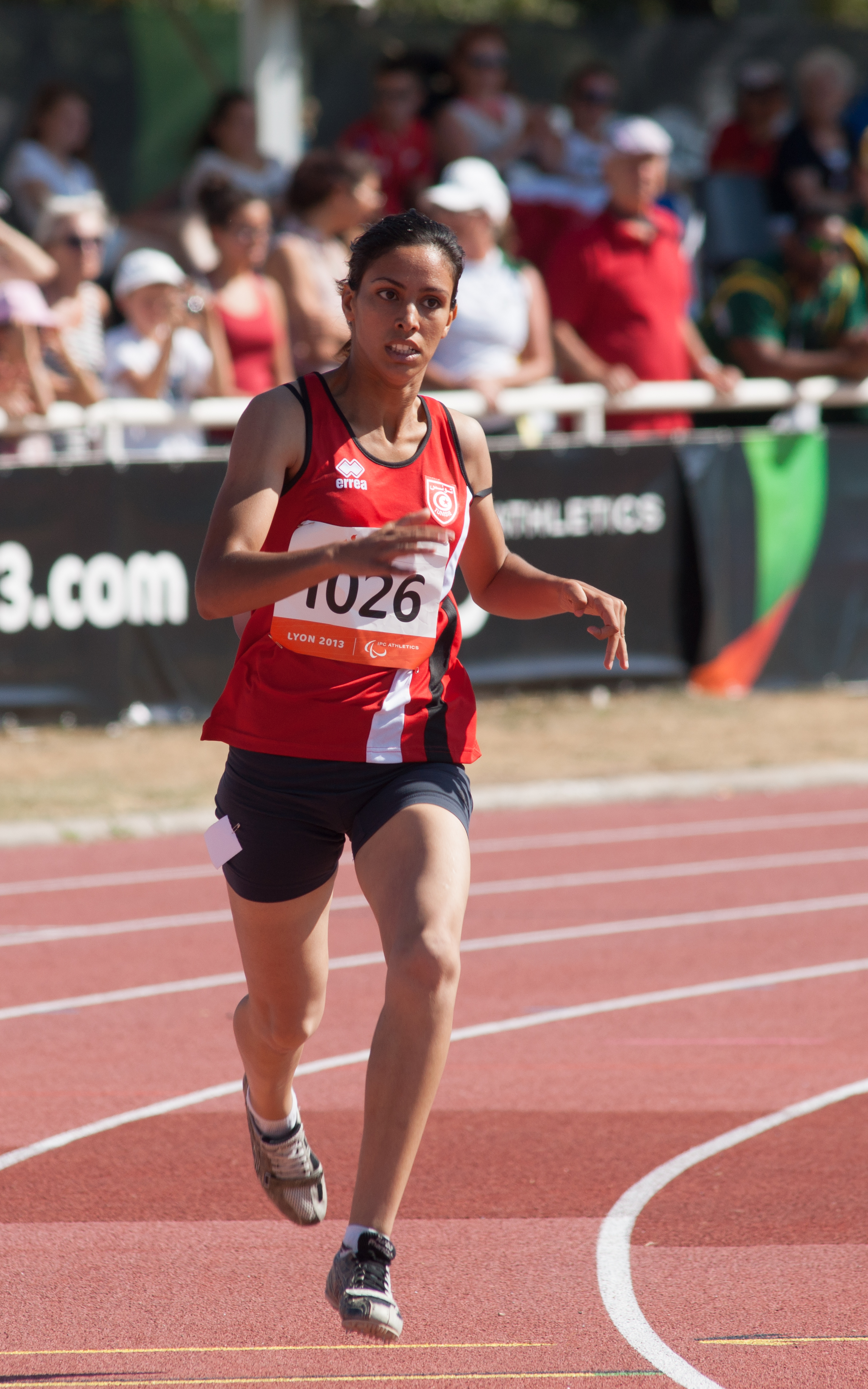

Personal information
- Native name: ندى الباهي
- Born: 1 January 1992 (age 34)
- Years active: 2002–present(Track and field T37–F37)

Sport
- Disability class: T37
- Events: T37 – 100 metres T37 – 200 metres T37 – 400 metres T37 – Women's Long Jump
Medal record
Women's para athletics
Representing Tunisia
Paralympic Games
Gold medal – first place	2012 London	400 m – T37
Bronze medal – third place	2012 London	100 m – T37
Bronze medal – third place	2016 Rio	400 m – T37
World Championships
Silver medal – second place	2013 Lyon	400 m – T37
African Games
Silver medal – second place	2015 Brazzaville	100 m – T37

Neda Bahi (Arabic: ندى الباهي, born 1 January 1992) is a Paralympic athlete from Tunisia competing mainly in category T37 sprint events.

== Achievements ==
She competed in the 2012 Summer Paralympics in London, UK. There she won a gold medal in Women's 400 metres – T37 event.

In 2013 IPC Athletics World Championships in Lyon, Neda Bahi won a silver medal in Women's 400 metres – T37 event.
