= Lorena Salvatini Spoladore =

Brazilian Paralympic athlete (born 1995)

Lorena Spoladore
Personal information
- Full name: Lorena Salvatini Spoladore
- Born: 19 December 1995 (age 30) Maringá, Paraná, Brazil
- Height: 1.73 m (5 ft 8 in)
- Weight: 60 kg (132 lb)

Sport
- Country: Brazil
- Sport: Paralympic athletics
- Disability: Congenital glaucoma
- Disability class: T11
- Club: Instituto Athlon
- Coached by: Amaury Wagner Verissimo
Medal record
Paralympic athletics
Representing Brazil
Paralympic Games
Silver medal – second place	2016 Rio de Janeiro	Mixed 4x100m relay T11-13
Bronze medal – third place	2016 Rio de Janeiro	Long jump T11
Bronze medal – third place	2024 Paris	100 m T11
World Championships
Gold medal – first place	2013 Lyon	Long jump T11
Silver medal – second place	2015 Doha	Long jump T11
Silver medal – second place	2023 Paris	Long jump T11
Silver medal – second place	2024 Kobe	Long jump T11
Bronze medal – third place	2019 Dubai	100m T11
Bronze medal – third place	2019 Dubai	200m T11
Bronze medal – third place	2024 Kobe	200m T11
Parapan American Games
Bronze medal – third place	2015 Toronto	Long jump T11
Bronze medal – third place	2019 Lima	100m T11
Bronze medal – third place	2019 Lima	200m T11

Lorena Salvatini Spoladore (Note: This name uses Portuguese naming customs: the first or maternal family name is Salvatini and the second or paternal family name is Spoladore.) (born 19 December 1995) is a Brazilian Paralympic athlete who competes in sprinting and long jump events at international elite events. She has won two medals at the 2016 Summer Paralympics, a World Championship gold medal in long jump and has won three bronze medals in sprinting.
