= Nataliia Kobzar =

Ukrainian Paralympic athlete (born 2000)

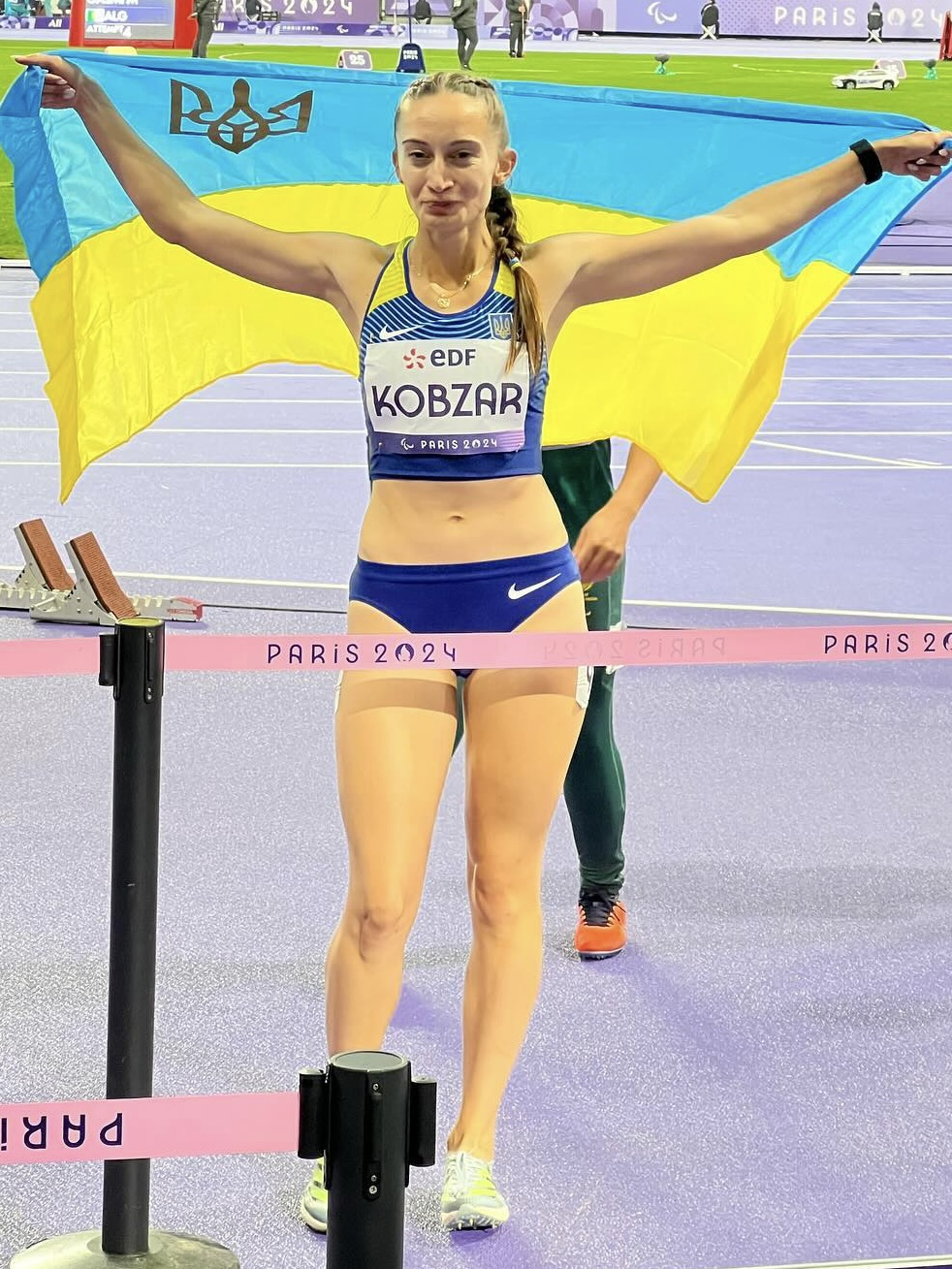
- Kobzar at the 2024 Summer Paralympics

Personal information
- Native name: Наталія Миколаївна Кобзар
- Full name: Nataliia Mikolaevna Kobzar
- Born: 19 January 2000 (age 26) Kremenchuk, Ukraine

Sport
- Country: Ukraine
- Sport: Para-athletics
- Disability class: T37
- Events: 100 metres; 200 metres; 400 metres
Medal record
Women's para-athletics
Representing Ukraine
Event	1st	2nd	3rd
Paralympic Games	1	2	0
World Championships	3	4	0
European Championships	2	3	0
Total	6	9	0
Paralympic Games
Gold medal – first place	2024 Paris	400 m T37
Silver medal – second place	2020 Tokyo	400 m T37
Silver medal – second place	2024 Paris	200 m T37
World Championships
Gold medal – first place	2017 London	200 m T37
Gold medal – first place	2019 Dubai	400 m T37
Gold medal – first place	2025 New Delhi	400 m T37
Silver medal – second place	2017 London	100 m T37
Silver medal – second place	2017 London	400 m T37
Silver medal – second place	2023 Paris	400 m T37
Silver medal – second place	2025 New Delhi	200 m T37
European Championships
Gold medal – first place	2018 Berlin	400 m T37
Gold medal – first place	2021 Bydgoszcz	400 m T37
Silver medal – second place	2018 Berlin	100 m T37
Silver medal – second place	2021 Bydgoszcz	100 m T37
Silver medal – second place	2021 Bydgoszcz	200 m T37
- Updated on 16 October 2025

Nataliia Mikolaevna Kobzar (Ukrainian: Наталія Миколаївна Кобзар, 19 January 2000) is a Ukrainian Paralympic athlete. She competes in 100, 200 and 400 metres sprinting events for T37-classified athletes. She is a three-time medalist, including gold, at the Summer Paralympics. She won the gold medal in the women's 400 metres T37 at the 2024 Summer Paralympics in Paris, France.

Kobzar is a two-time gold medalist at both the World Para Athletics Championships and the World Para Athletics European Championships. She also won six silver medals at these competitions.

== Career ==
At the World Para Athletics Championships, Kobzar won the gold medals in the women's 200 metres T37 event at the 2017 World Para Athletics Championships held in London, United Kingdom and in the women's 400 metres T37 event at the 2019 World Para Athletics Championships held in Dubai, United Arab Emirates.

In 2021, Kobzar won three medals at the World Para Athletics European Championships held in Bydgoszcz, Poland: she won the gold medal in her 400 metres event and the silver medals in her 100 metres and 200 metres events. Two months later, she won the silver medal in the women's 400 metres T37 event at the 2020 Summer Paralympics held in Tokyo, Japan.

In 2024, Kobzar participated in the Paralympic Games in Paris, where, on 30 August, she finished 2nd in the women's 200 metres T37 event and, on 3 September, she won the gold medal in the women's 400 meters T37 event.

== Achievements ==
Year	Competition	Venue	Position	Event	Time
2017	World Championships	London, United Kingdom	1st	200 m	27.62
2017	World Championships	London, United Kingdom	2nd	100 m	13.60
2017	World Championships	London, United Kingdom	2nd	400 m	1:02.83
2018	European Championships	Berlin, Germany	2nd	100 m	13.67
2018	European Championships	Berlin, Germany	1st	400 m	1:05.24
2019	World Championships	Dubai, United Arab Emirates	1st	400 m	1:02.44
2021	European Championships	Bydgoszcz, Poland	2nd	200 m	27.72
2021	European Championships	Bydgoszcz, Poland	1st	400 m	1:03.78
2021	European Championships	Bydgoszcz, Poland	2nd	100 m	13.37
2021	Summer Paralympics	Tokyo, Japan	2nd	400 m	1:01.47
2023	World Championships	Paris, France	2nd	400 m	1:01.33
2024	Summer Paralympics	Paris, France	2nd	200 m	27.43
2024	Summer Paralympics	Paris, France	1st	400 m	1:00.92
