= Liezel Gouws =

South African Paralympic athlete

Personal information
- National team: South Africa
- Born: 28 December 1998 (age 27) Klerksdorp, South Africa
- Height: 1.69 m (5 ft 7 in)
- Weight: 55 kg (121 lb; 8 st 9 lb)

Sport
- Country: South Africa
- Sport: Para Athletics
- Disability class: T37
- Coached by: Shaun Bownes
Medal record
Paralympic athletics
Representing South Africa
World Championships
Bronze medal – third place	2024 Kobe	400 m T37

Liezel Gouws (born 28 December 1998) is a South African female Paralympic athlete and a world record holder of 800m event under T37 classification for women (2:42.39) which was set in 2015 at Johannesburg, South Africa during the national Championships. She also competed in the 2016 Summer Paralympics. She was also part of team South Africa for the 2020 Tokyo Paralympic Games where she finished fifth in the 400m final.

== Biography ==
Gouws was born in 1998 not as a disabled child in Klerksdorp. Gouws had to confront cerebral palsy which was resulted due to a stroke she had in 2004, when she was just five years old. She sees her recovery process and abilities that she has today as miracle on miracle. There were doctors who gave her just two years to live. Currently she competed at three World Championships and two Paralympic Games for South Africa. She is also a Pharmacy student at the NWU.

== Career ==
Liezel Gouws started to involve in Para Athletics in 2012 and went on to make her international debut in 2013. She broke the world record for the 800m event under the T37 classification in 2015. In 2016, she was awarded the Para Sportswoman of the Year. She was part of team South Africa at the 2017 and 2019 World Championships as well. She competed at the 2016 and 2020 Paralympic Games as well.
