= Mandy François-Elie =

French Paralympic athlete (born 1989)

Mandy François-Élie
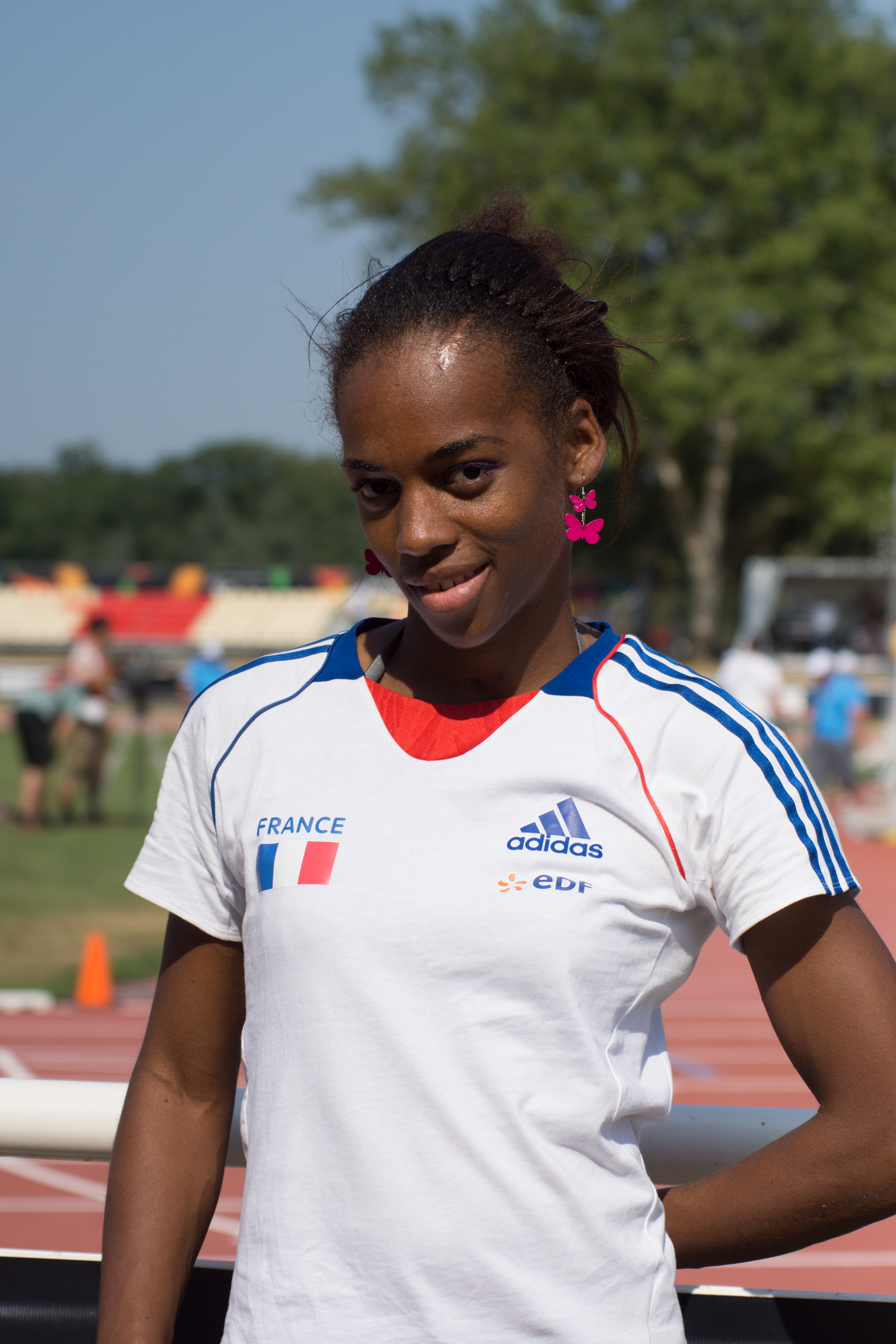
- François-Élie at the 2013 IPC Athletics Championship

Personal information
- Nationality: French
- Born: 27 September 1989 (age 36) Le Lamentin, Martinique

Sport
- Sport: Running
- Event: 100m / 200m sprint
- Club: Foyal Club Handisport
Medal record
Women's para athletics (T37)
Representing France
Paralympic Games
Gold medal – first place	2012 London	100m - T37
Silver medal – second place	2016 Rio de Janeiro	100m - T37
Bronze medal – third place	2020 Tokyo	200m - T37
World Championships
Gold medal – first place	2013 Lyon	100m - T37
Gold medal – first place	2013 Lyon	200m - T37
Silver medal – second place	2015 Doha	400m - T37
Silver medal – second place	2017 London	200 m T37
European Championships
Gold medal – first place	2014 Swansea	100m - T37
Silver medal – second place	2012 Stadskanaal	100m - T37
Silver medal – second place	2014 Swansea	400m - T37

Mandy François-Élie (born 27 September 1989) is a French Paralympian athlete competing in the category T37. François-Élie won the T37 100m sprint at the 2012 Summer Paralympic Games at London and followed this with both the 100m and 200m titles at the 2013 IPC Athletics World Championships in Lyon.

== Career history ==
François-Élie was born on the island of Martinique in 1989. She became interested in athletics at a young age and competed while in school. In 2008, while leaving school, she suffered a stroke which put her into a coma. On recovery it was discovered that she had suffered permanent motor damage. Several years later François-Elie returned to sport and began competing in T37 classification sprints.

François-Élie was selected for the French national team for the 2012 Summer Paralympics in London. She entered both the T37 100m and 400m races, and in the 100m she qualified for the final after finishing in first place with a time of 14.30. In the final she ran a time of 14.08 to beat Namibia's Johanna Benson into second place, winning her first Paralympic gold medal. In the 400m François-Elie finished 4th in the first-round qualifier, in a time that was not good enough for a position in the final.

On 8 June at a meet at Saint Cyr-sur-Loire, François-Elie posted a time of 13.68 in the 100m, a new world record. In July, she was seen as a favourite going into the IPC Athletics World Championships in Lyon. She entered both the 100m and 200m races winning both to become the world champion in her class. In the 200m final, François-Elie ran a time of 28.35, beating the 13-year-old world record held by Lisa McIntosh of Australia.

At the 2016 Summer Paralympics in Rio de Janeiro she followed up her London success by claiming silver in the T37 100m with a time of 13.45.
