= Viktoriia Slanova =

Russian Paralympic athlete (born 1997)

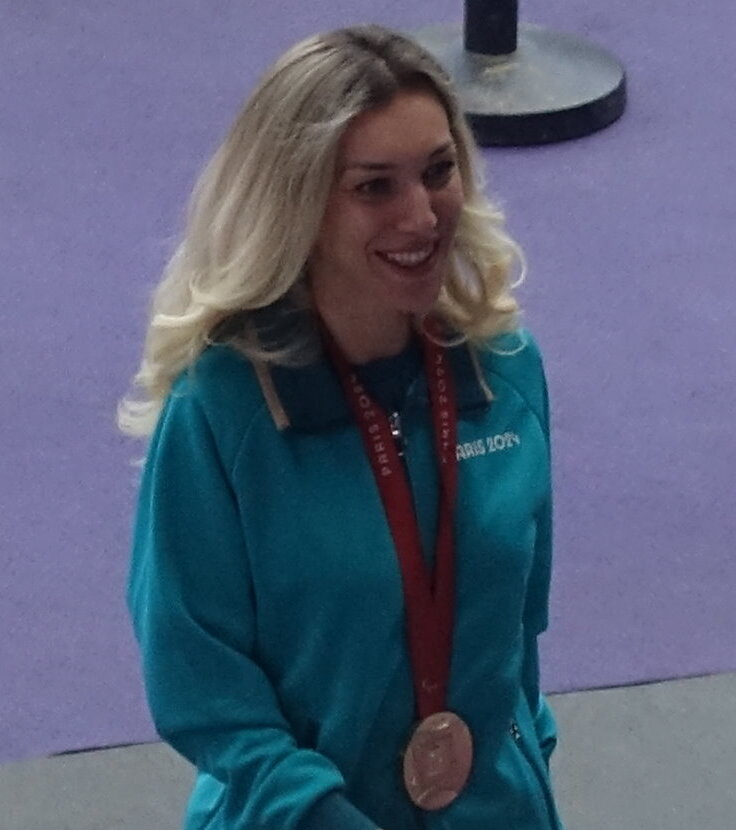
- Slanova at the 2024 Summer Paralympics

Personal information
- Nationality: Russian
- Born: 10 March 1997 (age 29) Vladikavkaz, Russia

Sport
- Sport: Para-athletics
- Disability class: T37
- Event: Sprints
Medal record
Women's para-athletics
Representing Neutral Paralympic Athletes
Paralympic Games
Bronze medal – third place	2024 Paris	400 m T37
World Championships
Silver medal – second place	2025 New Delhi	400 m T37
Bronze medal – third place	2025 New Delhi	100 m T37

Viktoriia Slanova (born 10 March 1997) is a Russian T37 Paralympic sprint runner.

== Career ==
Slanova represented Neutral Paralympic Athletes at the 2024 Summer Paralympics and won a bronze medal in the 400 metres T37 event. She competed at the 2025 World Para Athletics Championships and won a silver medal in the 400 metres T37 event.
