= Sheryl James (athlete) =

South African Paralympic athlete (born 1986)

Personal information
- Born: 11 February 1986 (age 40) Pretoria, South Africa

Sport
- Country: South Africa
- Sport: Para-athletics
- Disability class: T37
- Events: 100 metres; 200 metres; 400 metres
Medal record
Women's Paralympic athletics
Representing South Africa
Paralympic Games
Bronze medal – third place	2020 Tokyo	400 m T37
World Championships
Bronze medal – third place	2019 Dubai	400 m T37
Bronze medal – third place	2025 New Delhi	400 m T37

Sheryl James (born 11 February 1986) is a South African Paralympic athlete. She competes in 100, 200 and 400 metres sprinting events. She is a bronze medalist at the World Para Athletics Championships and also at the Summer Paralympics.

== Early life ==
Born in Pretoria, James was born with cerebral palsy and hemiplegia in the right side of her body due to a lack of oxygen at birth.

== Career ==
James began competing at a competitive level in 2018 at the age of 32.

At the 2019 World Para Athletics Championships, James won the bronze medal in the women's 400 metres.

At the 2020 Summer Paralympics (held in 2021), James won the bronze medal in the T37 400m, beating her personal best in 1:03.82, behind China's Jiang Fenfen (1:01.36) and Ukraine's Natalia Kobzar (1:01.47). A few days later, she finished 5th in the T37 100m and 4th in the T37 100m.

James competed at the 2025 World Para Athletics Championships and won a bronze medal in the 400 metres event.
