= T37 (classification) =

Para-athletics classification

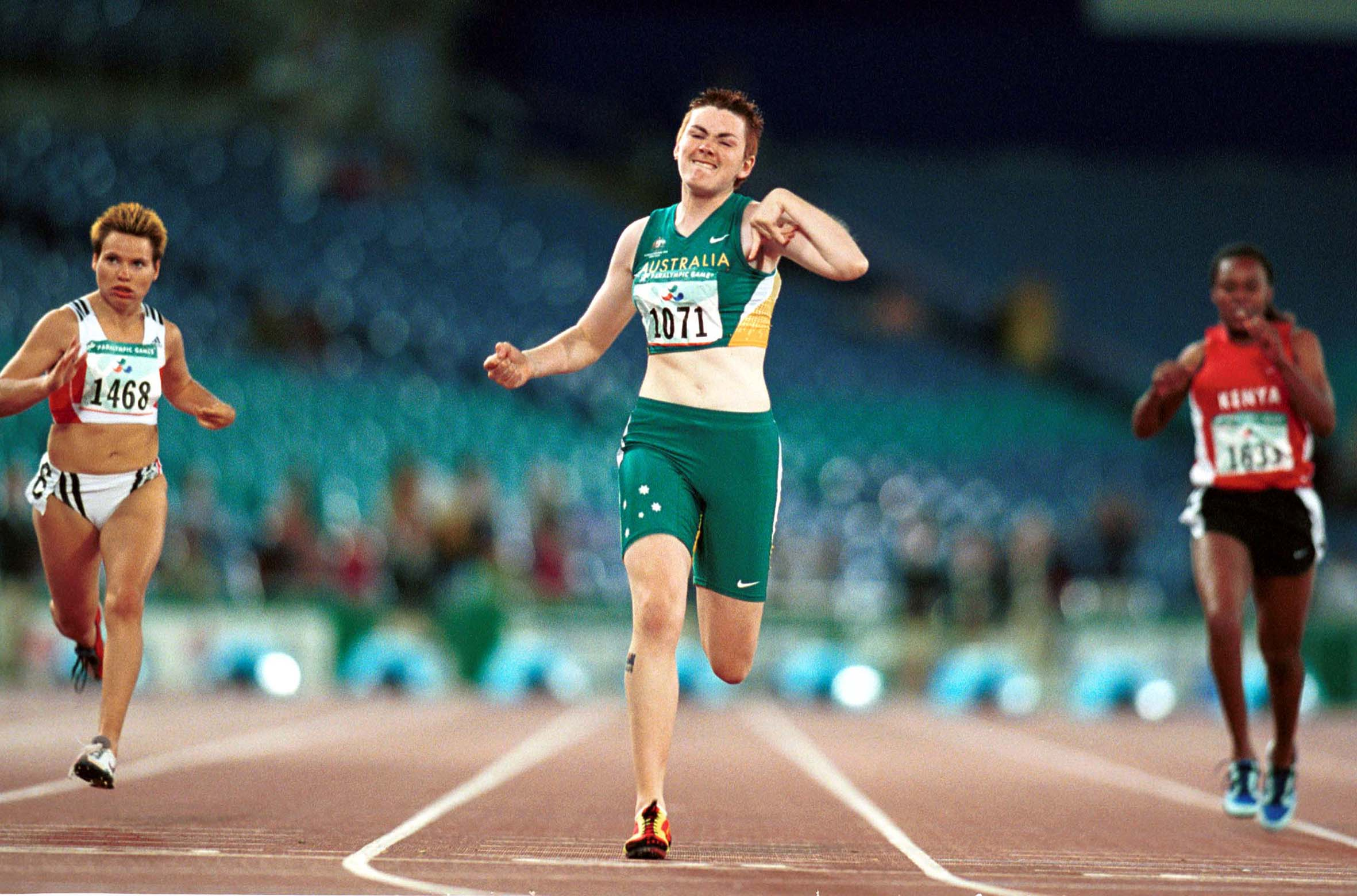
Lisa McIntosh is a T37 athlete.

T37 is a disability sport classification for disability athletics in track and jump events. It includes people who have coordination impairments such as hypertonia, ataxia and athetosis. It is the athletics equivalent of the more general CP7 classification.

== Definition ==
This classification is for disability athletics in track and jump events. This classification is one of seven classifications for athletes with cerebral palsy. Similar classifications are T32, T33, T34, T35, T36, and T38. The Australian Paralympic Committee defines this classification as being for "Moderate to minimal hemiplegia (i.e. one half of the body affected – arm and leg on same side). Good functional ability in non affected side. Walks / runs without assistive devices, but with a limp." The International Paralympic Committee defined this classification on their website in July 2016 as, "Coordination impairments (hypertonia, ataxia and athetosis)".

== Disability groups ==
Multiple types of disabilities are eligible to compete in this class. This class includes people who have cerebral palsy, or who have had a stroke or traumatic brain injury.

=== Cerebral palsy ===
==== CP7 ====
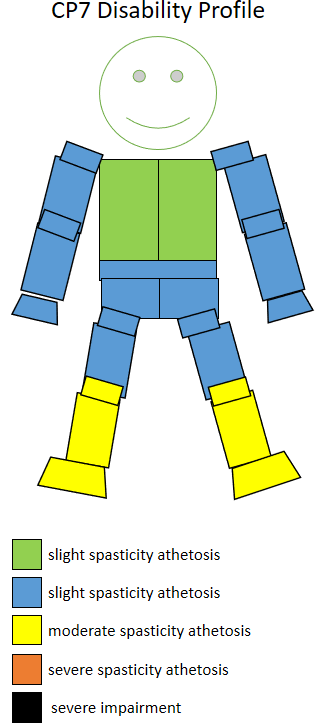
The spasticity athetosis level and location of a CP7 sportsperson.

Their running form manifests as if they have a limp. Their disability manifests itself less when they are running as opposed to walking. CP7 sportspeople are able to walk, but appear to do so while having a limp as one side of their body is more affected than the other. They may have involuntary muscles spasms on one side of their body. They have fine motor control on their dominant side of the body, which can present as asymmetry when they are in motion. People in this class tend to have energy expenditure similar to people without cerebral palsy.

== Rules and performance ==
Athletes in this class are not required to use a starting block. It is up to the individual. They have the option to start from a crouch, from a standing position or 3 point stance. Because of their disability, athletes may make movements that normally would disqualify them as a false start. If an official believes movement could be a result of this, they can restart the entire field without disqualifying any runners.

== Events ==
There are a number of track and field events open to this class at various international competitions. Many have their own minimum qualifying times and scores.

gender	Event	Class	AQS/MQS	BQS	Event
men's	100m	T37	11.6	11.79	2016 Summer Paralympics
women's	100m	T37	13.83	14.28	2016 Summer Paralympics
men's	400m	T37	52.78	54	2016 Summer Paralympics
women's	400m	T37	65.75	69.33	2016 Summer Paralympics
men's	1500m	T37	04:18.7	04:30.0	2016 Summer Paralympics
men's	long jump	T37	6.16	5.78	2016 Summer Paralympics
women's	long jump	T37	4.5	4.08	2016 Summer Paralympics

== History ==
The classification was created by the International Paralympic Committee and has roots in a 2003 attempt to address "the overall objective to support and co-ordinate the ongoing development of accurate, reliable, consistent and credible sport focused classification systems and their implementation."

== Governance ==
Classification into this class is handled by the International Paralympic Committee. For national events, classification is handled by the national athletics organization.

== Becoming classified ==
Athletes with cerebral palsy or similar impairments who wish to compete in para-athletics competition must first undergo a classification assessment. During this, they both undergo a bench test of muscle coordination and demonstrate their skills in athletics, such as running or jumping. A determination is then made as to what classification an athlete should compete in. Classifications may be Confirmed or Review status. For athletes who do not have access to a full classification panel, Provisional classification is available; this is a temporary Review classification, considered an indication of class only, and generally used only in lower levels of competition.
