= Athletics at the 2020 Summer Paralympics – Women's 100 metres T11 =

Women's 100 metres T11 at the XVI Paralympic Games
- Venue: Tokyo National Stadium
- Dates: 30 August 2021 (heats); 31 August 2021 (final)
- Competitors: 13 from 11 nations
- Winning time: 12.05

Medalists
1st place, gold medalist(s)		Linda Patricia Perez Lopez	Venezuela
2nd place, silver medalist(s)		Liu Cuiqing	China

The women's 100 metres T11 event at the 2020 Summer Paralympics in Tokyo, took place between 30 and 31 August 2021. Linda Patricia Perez Lopez won a gold medal representing Venezuela. Nobody won a bronze medal because two of the four finalists got disqualified.

The T11 category is for athletes with a visual impairment. A T11 athlete may be entirely without sight, or be able to perceive light, but have no ability to see the shape of a hand at any distance. T11 athletes commonly run with guides.

== Records ==
Prior to the competition, the existing records were as follows:

World record	Jerusa Geber Dos Santos (BRA)	11.85	São Paulo, Brazil	27 September 2019
Paralympic record	Libby Clegg (GBR)	11.91	Rio de Janeiro, Brazil	9 September 2016

Area	Time	Athlete	Nation
Africa	12.56	Lahja Ishitile	Namibia
America	11.85 WR	Jerusa Geber Dos Santos	Brazil
Asia	11.96	Liu Cuiqing	China
Europe	11.91 PR	Libby Clegg	Great Britain
Oceania	14.42	Karlee Symonds	Australia

== Results ==
=== Heats ===
Heat 1 took place on 30 August 2021, at 11:20:

Rank	Lane	Name	Nationality	Time	Notes
1	5	Liu Cuiqing	China	12.80	Q, SB
2	3	Juliana Ngleya Moko	Angola	13.03	q, PB

Heat 2 took place on 30 August 2021, at 11:28:

Rank	Lane	Name	Nationality	Time	Notes
1	3	Thalita Simplício	Brazil	12.38	Q, SB
2	5	Linda Patricia Perez Lopez	Venezuela	12.42	q, PB
3	7	Aurélie Faravavy	Madagascar	14.29	PB
4	1	Keula Nidreia Pereira Semedo	Cape Verde	15.53	SB

Heat 3 took place on 30 August 2021, at 11:36:

Rank	Lane	Name	Nationality	Time	Notes
1	7	Lorena Salvatini Spoladore	Brazil	12.48	Q, SB
2	1	Angie Pabón	Colombia	12.97	q
3	5	Melissa Baldera	Peru	13.90	PB
4	3	Fathimath Ibrahim	Maldives	18.08	PB

Heat 4 took place on 30 August 2021, at 11:44:

Rank	Lane	Name	Nationality	Time	Notes
1	3	Jerusa Geber Dos Santos	Brazil	12.41	Q
2	7	Judith Mariette Lebog	Cameroon	12.82	q, PB
3	5	Chiaki Takada	Japan	13.66	SB

=== Semi-finals ===
Semi-final 1 took place on 30 August 2021, at 19:18:

Rank	Lane	Name	Nationality	Time	Notes
1	5	Jerusa Geber Dos Santos	Brazil	12.26	Q
2	3	Lorena Salvatini Spoladore	Brazil	12.37	SB
	1	Judith Mariette Lebog	Cameroon	DQ	WPA 19.4
	7	Angie Pabón	Colombia	DNS	

Semi-final 2 took place on 30 August 2021, at 19:26:

Rank	Lane	Name	Nationality	Time	Notes
1	1	Linda Patricia Perez Lopez	Venezuela	12.29	Q, PB
2	5	Thalita Simplício	Brazil	12.32	q, SB
3	3	Liu Cuiqing	China	12.35	q, SB
4	7	Juliana Ngleya Moko	Angola	13.15	

=== Final ===
The final took place on 31 August 2021, at 20:02:

Rank	Lane	Name	Nationality	Time	Notes
1st place, gold medalist(s)	3	Linda Patricia Perez Lopez	Venezuela	12.05	PB
2nd place, silver medalist(s)	1	Liu Cuiqing	China	12.15	SB
	5	Jerusa Geber Dos Santos	Brazil	DQ	WPA 6.15.3
	7	Thalita Simplício	Brazil	DQ	WPA 7.9.3
