= Brazil at the 2020 Summer Paralympics =

- Flag of Brazil
- IPC code: BRA
- NPC: Brazilian Paralympic Committee

in Tokyo, Japan August 24, 2021 – September 5, 2021
- Competitors: 253 in 20 sports
- Flag bearers: Petrúcio Ferreira; Evelyn Oliveira (opening); Daniel Dias (closing)
- Medals Ranked 7th: Gold 22 Silver 20 Bronze 30 Total 72

Summer Paralympics appearances (overview)
- 1972; 1976; 1980; 1984; 1988; 1992; 1996; 2000; 2004; 2008; 2012; 2016; 2020; 2024

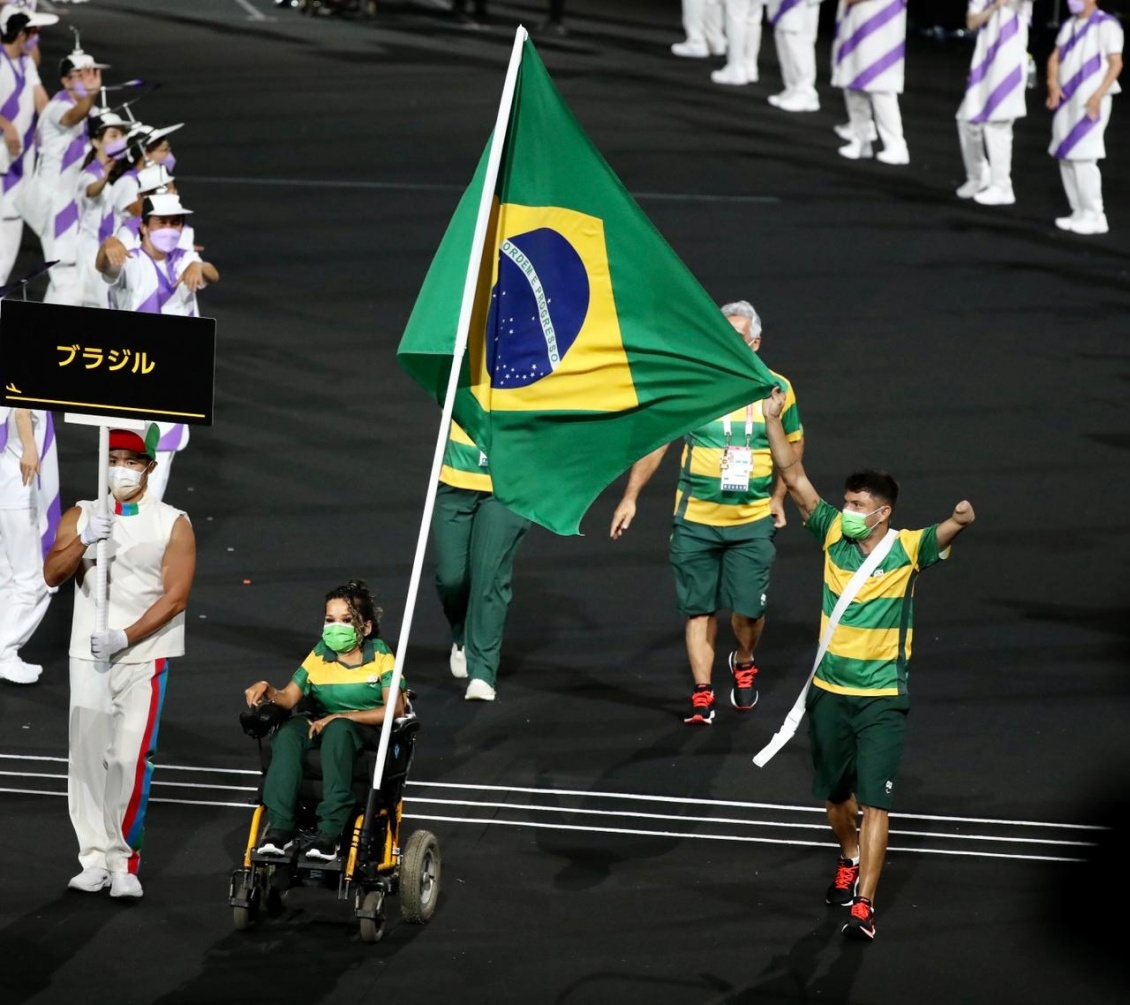
Flag bearers Petrúcio Ferreira and Evelyn Oliveira during the opening ceremony.

Brazil competed at the 2020 Summer Paralympics in Tokyo, Japan from 24 August to 5 September 2021.

== Medalists ==
| Medal | Name | Sport | Event | Date |
|---|---|---|---|---|
| Gold | Gabriel Bandeira | Swimming | Men's 100 metre butterfly S14 | 25 August |
| Gold | Yeltsin Jacques | Athletics | Men's 5000 metres T11 | 27 August |
| Gold | Silvânia Costa de Oliveira | Athletics | Women's long jump T11 | 27 August |
| Gold | Wendell Belarmino Pereira | Swimming | Men's 50 metre freestyle S11 | 27 August |
| Gold | Petrúcio Ferreira | Athletics | Men's 100 metres T47 | 27 August |
| Gold | Wallace Santos | Athletics | Men's shot put T55 | 27 August |
| Gold | Mariana D'Andrea | Powerlifting | Women's 73 kg | 29 August |
| Gold | Alana Maldonado | Judo | Women's 70 kg | 29 August |
| Gold | Maria Carolina Gomes Santiago | Swimming | Women's 50 metre freestyle S13 | 29 August |
| Gold | Gabriel Araújo | Swimming | Men's 200 metre freestyle S2 | 29 August |
| Gold | Claudiney Batista | Athletics | Men's discus throw F56 | 30 August |
| Gold | Elizabeth Rodrigues Gomes | Athletics | Women's discus throw F53 | 30 August |
| Gold | Yeltsin Jacques | Athletics | Men's 1500 metres T11 | 31 August |
| Gold | Maria Carolina Gomes Santiago | Swimming | Women's 100 metre freestyle S12 | 31 August |
| Gold | Maria Carolina Gomes Santiago | Swimming | Women's 100 metre breaststroke SB12 | 1 September |
| Gold | Alessandro Rodrigo Silva | Athletics | Men's discus throw F11 | 2 September |
| Gold | Talisson Glock | Swimming | Men's 400 metre freestyle S6 | 2 September |
| Gold | Gabriel Araújo | Swimming | Men's 50 metre backstroke S2 | 2 September |
| Gold | Nathan Torquato | Taekwondo | Men's 61 kg | 2 September |
| Gold | Brazil men's national goalball team: José Roberto Oliveira; Alex de Melo; Leomon Moreno; Josemárcio Sousa; Romário Marques; Emerson da Silva | Goalball | Men's tournament | 3 September |
| Gold | Fernando Rufino de Paulo | Paracanoeing | Men's VL2 | 4 September |
| Gold | Brazil men's national football 5-a-side team: Luan Gonçalves; Cássio Reis; Raimundo Mendes; Tiago da Silva; Ricardo Alves; Damião Ramos; Jardiel Vieira Soares; Jeferson Gonçalves; Gledson da Paixão; Matheus Bumussa | Football 5-a-side | Men's tournament | 4 September |
| Silver | Gabriel Araújo | Swimming | Men's 100 metre backstroke S2 | 25 August |
| Silver | Jovane Guissone | Wheelchair fencing | Men's épée B | 26 August |
| Silver | Rodolpho Riskalla | Equestrian | Individual championship test grade IV | 26 August |
| Silver | Gabriel Bandeira | Swimming | Men's 200 metre freestyle S14 | 27 August |
| Silver | Thalita Simplício | Athletics | Women's 400 metres T11 | 28 August |
| Silver | Bruna Costa Alexandre | Table tennis | Women's individual class 10 | 30 August |
| Silver | Vinícius Gonçalves Rodrigues | Athletics | Men's 100 metres T63 | 30 August |
| Silver | Alessandro Rodrigo Silva | Athletics | Men's shot put F11 | 30 August |
| Silver | Raíssa Rocha Machado | Athletics | Women's javelin throw F56 | 31 August |
| Silver | Gabriel Bandeira | Swimming | Men's 200 metre individual medley SM14 | 31 August |
| Silver | Wendell Belarmino Pereira; Douglas Matera; Lucilene da Silva; Maria Carolina Gomes Santiago | Swimming | Mixed 4 x 100 metre freestyle relay 49pts | 31 August |
| Silver | Cecília Jerônimo de Araújo | Swimming | Women's 50 metre freestyle S8 | 1 September |
| Silver | Marivana Oliveira | Athletics | Women's shot put F35 | 2 September |
| Silver | Luis Cardoso da Silva | Paracanoeing | Men's KL1 | 3 September |
| Silver | Marco Aurélio Borges | Athletics | Men's shot put F57 | 3 September |
| Silver | Giovane Vieira de Paula | Paracanoeing | Men's VL3 | 4 September |
| Silver | Thalita Simplício | Athletics | Women's 200 metres T11 | 4 September |
| Silver | Thomaz Ruan de Moraes | Athletics | Men's 400 metres T47 | 4 September |
| Silver | Débora Menezes | Taekwondo | Women's +58 kg | 4 September |
| Silver | Alex Douglas Pires da Silva | Athletics | Men's marathon T46 | 5 September |
| Bronze | Phelipe Rodrigues | Swimming | Men's 50 metre freestyle S10 | 25 August |
| Bronze | Daniel Dias | Swimming | Men's 200 metre freestyle S5 | 25 August |
| Bronze | Daniel Dias | Swimming | Men's 100 metre freestyle S5 | 26 August |
| Bronze | Patrícia Pereira; Daniel Dias; Joana Neves; Talisson Glock | Swimming | Mixed 4 × 50 metre freestyle relay 20pts | 26 August |
| Bronze | Maria Carolina Gomes Santiago | Swimming | Women's 100 metre backstroke S12 | 27 August |
| Bronze | Washington Junior | Athletics | Men's 100 metres T47 | 27 August |
| Bronze | João Victor Teixeira de Souza Silva | Athletics | Men's shot put F37 | 27 August |
| Bronze | Julyana Cristina da Silva | Athletics | Women's discus throw F57 | 28 August |
| Bronze | Cátia Oliveira | Table tennis | Women's individual class 1–2 | 28 August |
| Bronze | Lúcia Teixeira | Judo | Women's 57 kg | 28 August |
| Bronze | Gabriel Bandeira; Ana Karolina Soares; Débora Carneiro; Felipe Vila Real | Swimming | Mixed 4 x 100 metre S14 | 28 August |
| Bronze | Cícero Valdiran Lins Nobre | Athletics | Men's javelin throw F57 | 28 August |
| Bronze | Renê Pereira | Rowing | Men's single sculls | 29 August |
| Bronze | Beatriz Carneiro | Swimming | Women's 100 metre breaststroke SB14 | 29 August |
| Bronze | Meg Emmerich | Judo | Women's +70 kg | 29 August |
| Bronze | Mariana Ribeiro | Swimming | Women's 100 metre freestyle S9 | 31 August |
| Bronze | Jardênia Félix | Athletics | Women's 400 metres T20 | 31 August |
| Bronze | Maciel Santos | Boccia | Mixed individual BC2 | 1 September |
| Bronze | José Carlos Chagas de Oliveira | Boccia | Mixed individual BC1 | 1 September |
| Bronze | Talisson Glock | Swimming | Men's 100 metre freestyle S6 | 1 September |
| Bronze | Bruna Alexandre; Danielle Rauen | Table tennis | Women's team class 9–10 | 1 September |
| Bronze | Mateus Evangelista Cardoso | Athletics | Men's long jump T37 | 2 September |
| Bronze | João Victor Teixeira de Souza Silva | Athletics | Men's discus throw F37 | 3 September |
| Bronze | Wendell Belarmino Pereira | Swimming | Men's 100 metre butterfly S11 | 3 September |
| Bronze | Silvana Fernandes | Taekwondo | Women's 58 kg | 3 September |
| Bronze | Thiago Paulino dos Santos | Athletics | Men's shot put F57 | 3 September |
| Bronze | Ricardo Gomes de Mendonça | Athletics | Men's 200 metres T37 | 4 September |
| Bronze | Brazil women's national sitting volleyball team: Ana Luísa Aparecida; Edwarda Dias; Gizele Dias; Adria Silva; Pâmela Perreira; Nathalie Filomena; Luiza Fiorese; Jani Freitas Batista; Bruna Nascimento; Nurya de Almeida; Laiana Batista; Camila Leiria | Sitting volleyball | Women's tournament | 4 September |
| Bronze | Jerusa Geber dos Santos | Athletics | Women's 200 metres T11 | 4 September |
| Bronze | Petrúcio Ferreira | Athletics | Men's 400 metres T47 | 4 September |

=== Medals by sport ===
Medals by sport
| Sport | 1st place, gold medalist(s) | 2nd place, silver medalist(s) | 3rd place, bronze medalist(s) | Total |
| Athletics | 8 | 9 | 11 | 28 |
| Swimming | 8 | 5 | 10 | 23 |
| Paracanoeing | 1 | 2 | 0 | 3 |
| Judo | 1 | 0 | 2 | 3 |
| Taekwondo | 1 | 1 | 1 | 3 |
| Powerlifting | 1 | 0 | 0 | 1 |
| Goalball | 1 | 0 | 0 | 1 |
| Football 5-a-side | 1 | 0 | 0 | 1 |
| Table tennis | 0 | 1 | 2 | 3 |
| Equestrian | 0 | 1 | 0 | 1 |
| Wheelchair Fencing | 0 | 1 | 0 | 1 |
| Boccia | 0 | 0 | 2 | 2 |
| Rowing | 0 | 0 | 1 | 1 |
| Sitting volleyball | 0 | 0 | 1 | 1 |
| Total | 22 | 20 | 30 | 72 |

=== Medals by date ===
Medals by date
| Day | Date | Gold medal | Silver medal | Bronze medal | Total |
| 1 | 25 Aug | 1 | 1 | 2 | 4 |
| 2 | 26 Aug | 0 | 2 | 2 | 4 |
| 3 | 27 Aug | 5 | 1 | 3 | 9 |
| 4 | 28 Aug | 0 | 1 | 5 | 6 |
| 5 | 29 Aug | 4 | 0 | 3 | 7 |
| 6 | 30 Aug | 2 | 3 | 0 | 5 |
| 7 | 31 Aug | 2 | 3 | 2 | 7 |
| 8 | 1 Sep | 1 | 1 | 4 | 6 |
| 9 | 2 Sep | 4 | 1 | 1 | 6 |
| 10 | 3 Sep | 1 | 2 | 4 | 7 |
| 11 | 4 Sep | 2 | 4 | 4 | 10 |
| 12 | 5 Sep | 0 | 1 | 0 | 1 |
| Total | | 22 | 20 | 30 | 72 |

=== Medals by gender ===
Medals by gender^{(Comparison graphs)}
| Gender | Gold medal | Silver medal | Bronze medal | Total |
| Male | 15 | 10 | 17 | 42 |
| Female | 7 | 8 | 12 | 27 |
| Mixed | 0 | 1 | 2 | 3 |
| Total | 22 | 20 | 30 | 72 |

== Competitors ==
| Sport | Men | Women | Total |
|---|---|---|---|
| Archery | 3 | 3 | 6 |
| Athletics | 41 | 24 | 65 |
| Badminton | 1 | 0 | 1 |
| Boccia | 6 | 5 | 11 |
| Canoe Sprint | 4 | 3 | 7 |
| Cycling | 3 | 2 | 5 |
| Equestrian | 2 | 0 | 2 |
| Football 5-a-side | 10 | 0 | 10 |
| Goalball | 6 | 6 | 12 |
| Judo | 5 | 4 | 9 |
| Paratriathlon | 3 | 1 | 4 |
| Powerlifting | 4 | 3 | 7 |
| Rowing | 5 | 4 | 9 |
| Shooting | 1 | 0 | 1 |
| Sitting volleyball | 12 | 12 | 24 |
| Swimming | 22 | 14 | 36 |
| Table Tennis | 6 | 8 | 14 |
| Taekwondo | 1 | 2 | 3 |
| Wheelchair fencing | 2 | 2 | 4 |
| Wheelchair tennis | 5 | 2 | 7 |
| Total | 142 | 95 | 237 |

== Archery ==
Brazil collected one quota place at the 2019 Para Archery World Championships held in Den Bosch, Netherlands. In March 2021, Brazil gained four more quotas at the Americas Continental Qualification Tournament, held in Monterrey, Mexico.

Men

| Athlete | Event | Ranking round | | Round of 32 | Round of 16 | Quarterfinals | Semifinals | Finals | |
| Athlete | Event | Score | Seed | Opposition score | Opposition score | Opposition score | Opposition score | Opposition score | Rank |
|---|---|---|---|---|---|---|---|---|---|
| Hélcio Perilo | Men's individual W1 | 622 | 10 | —N/a | Anderson (RSA); W 132–129 | Drahonínský (CZE); L 129–140 | did not advance | | |
| Andrey de Castro | Men's individual compound | 669 | 29 | Coates-Palgrave (RSA); L 135–142 | did not advance | | | | |
| Heriberto Rocca | Men's individual recurve | 581 | 27 | Kim (KOR); L 4–6 | did not advance | | | | |

Women

| Athlete | Event | Ranking round | | Round of 32 | Round of 16 | Quarterfinals | Semifinals | Finals | |
| Athlete | Event | Score | Seed | Opposition score | Opposition score | Opposition score | Opposition score | Opposition score | Rank |
|---|---|---|---|---|---|---|---|---|---|
| Rejane Silva | Women's individual W1 | 525 | 11 | —N/a | Rumary (GBR); L 107–115 | did not advance | | | |
| Jane Karla Gogel | Women's individual compound | 688 | 4 | —N/a | | Sarti (ITA); L 140–146 | did not advance | | |
| Fabíola Dergovics | Women's individual recurve | 572 | 11 | Ravish (USA); W 6–4 | Pattavaeo (THA); W 7–1 | Nemati (IRI); L 1–7 | did not advance | | |

Mixed

| Athlete | Event | Ranking round | | Round of 32 | Round of 16 | Quarterfinals | Semifinals | Finals | |
| Athlete | Event | Score | Seed | Opposition score | Opposition score | Opposition score | Opposition score | Opposition score | Rank |
|---|---|---|---|---|---|---|---|---|---|
| Hélcio Perilo; Rejane Silva | Mixed team W1 | 1147 | 7 | —N/a | | Drahoninsky / Musilova (CZE); L 126–131 | did not advance | | |
| Andrey de Castro; Jane Karla Gogel | Team compound open | 1357 | 9 | —N/a | Lelou / Chupin (FRA); L 142–145 | did not advance | | | |
| Heriberto Roca; Fabíola Dergovics | Team recurve open | 1153 | 11 | —N/a | Shigesada / Ueyama (JPN); L 1–5 | did not advance | | | |

== Athletics ==
Lucas Prado, Fábio Bordignon, Petrúcio Ferreira dos Santos, Yohansson Nascimento, Mateus Evangelista, Marivana Oliveira and Izabela Campos are among the athletes to represent Brazil at the 2020 Summer Paralympics.

Men's track

| Athlete | Event | Heats/Semifinal | | Final | |
| Athlete | Event | Result | Rank | Result | Rank |
|---|---|---|---|---|---|
| Alan Fonteles | Men's 100m T64 | 11.30 | 6 | did not advance | |
| Alex Douglas Pires da Silva | Men's marathon T46 | —N/a | | 2:27:00 | 2nd place, silver medalist(s) |
| Ariosvaldo Fernandes | Men's 100m T53 | 15.30 | 7 Q | 15.41 | 4 |
| Ariosvaldo Fernandes | Men's 400m T53 | 51.65 | 3 Q | 52.48 | 8 |
| Aser Ramos | Men's 100m T36 | 12.25 | 6 q | 12.52 | 5 |
| Christian Gabriel Luiz | Men's 100m T37 | 11.51 | 3 Q | 11.55 | 7 |
| Christian Gabriel Luiz | Men's 200m T37 | 23.80 | 1 Q | 23.49 | 8 |
| Daniel Silva | Men's 100m T11 | 11.60 | 10 | did not advance | |
| Daniel Silva | Men's 400m T11 | DSQ | – | did not advance | |
| Daniel Tavares | Men's 400m T20 | 50.10 | 5 | did not advance | |
| Edson Pinheiro | Men's 100m T38 | 11.70 | 5 | did not advance | |
| Edson Pinheiro | Men's 400m T38 | DNS | – | did not advance | |
| Fábio Bordignon | Men's 100m T35 | —N/a | | 12.54 | 5 |
| Fábio Bordignon | Men's 200m T35 | —N/a | | DSQ | – |
| Fabrício Barros | Men's 100m T12 | 11.13 | 2 | did not advance | |
| Fabrício Barros | Men's 400m T12 | 52.42 | 3 | did not advance | |
| Felipe Gomes | Men's 100m T11 | 11.68 | 8 | did not advance | |
| Felipe Gomes | Men's 400m T11 | 53.58 | 6 | did not advance | |
| Gustavo Henrique Dias | Men's 400m T20 | 51.12 | 6 | did not advance | |
| Joeferson Marinho | Men's 100m T12 | 10.85 | 4 | 11.24 | 4 |
| Júlio Cesar Agripino | Men's 1500m T11 | DSQ | – | did not advance | |
| Júlio Cesar Agripino | Men's 5000m T11 | —N/a | | 16:26.31 | 7 |
| Kesley Teodoro | Men's 100m T12 | 11.47 | 4 | did not advance | |
| Lucas de Sousa | Men's 100m T47 | 11.07 | 3 Q | 11.14 | 6 |
| Lucas de Sousa | Men's 400m T47 | 50.31 | 6 q | 50.11 | 7 |
| Lucas Prado | Men's 100m T11 | 11.44 | 6 | did not advance | |
| Mateus Evangelista | Men's 100m T37 | 11.79 | 10 | did not advance | |
| Petrúcio Ferreira | Men's 100m T47 | 10.75 | 1 Q | 10.53 | 1st place, gold medalist(s) |
| Petrúcio Ferreira | Men's 400m T47 | 49.76 | 2 Q | 48.04 | 3rd place, bronze medalist(s) |
| Ricardo Gomes de Mendonça | Men's 100m T37 | 11.45 | 3 Q | 11.52 | 5 |
| Ricardo Gomes de Mendonça | Men's 200m T37 | 22.90 | 1 Q | 22.62 | 3rd place, bronze medalist(s) |
| Rodrigo Parreira da Silva | Men's 100m T36 | 1:18.00 | 14 | did not advance | |
| Thomaz Ruan de Moraes | Men's 400m T47 | 49.95 | 3 Q | 47.87 | 2nd place, silver medalist(s) |
| Vinicius Gonçalves Rodrigues | Men's 100m T63 | 12.11 | 1 Q | 12.05 | 2nd place, silver medalist(s) |
| Vitor Antônio de Jesus | Men's 200m T37 | 24.79 | 6 | did not advance | |
| Washington Junior | Men's 100m T47 | 10.64 | 1 Q | 10.68 | 3rd place, bronze medalist(s) |
| Yeltsin Jacques | Men's 5000m T11 | —N/a | | 16:26.31 | 1st place, gold medalist(s) |
| Yeltsin Jacques | Men's 1500m T11 | 4:07.34 | 1 Q | 3:57.60 | 1st place, gold medalist(s) |
| Yeltsin Jacques | Men's marathon T12 | —N/a | | DNF | – |

Men's field

| Athlete | Event | Final | |
| Athlete | Event | Result | Rank |
|---|---|---|---|
| Aser Ramos | Men's long jump T36 | 5.58 | 4 |
| Cícero Nobre | Men's javelin throw F57 | 48.93 | 3rd place, bronze medalist(s) |
| Claudiney Batista | Men's discus throw F56 | 45.59 | 1st place, gold medalist(s) |
| Edenilson Floriani | Men's shot put F63 | 12.82 | 7 |
| Edenilson Floriani | Men's javelin throw F64 | 55.54 | 6 |
| Emanoel de Oliveira | Men's shot put F37 | 13.63 | 7 |
| Flávio Reitz | Men's high jump T63 | 1.77 | 6 |
| Francisco Jefferson de Lima | Men's javelin throw F64 | 56.33 | 5 |
| Gustavo Dias | Men's long jump T20 | DNS | – |
| Jeohsah dos Santos | Men's high jump T64 | 1.88 | 4 |
| João Victor Teixeira | Men's discus throw F37 | 51.86 | 3rd place, bronze medalist(s) |
| João Victor Teixeira | Men's shot put F37 | 14.45 | 3rd place, bronze medalist(s) |
| Marco Aurélio Borges | Men's shot put F57 | 14.85 | 2nd place, silver medalist(s) |
| Mateus Evangelista | Men's long jump T36 | 6.05 | 3rd place, bronze medalist(s) |
| Michel Abraham | Men's long jump T47 | 6.55 | 9 |
| Paulo Guerra | Men's high jump T47 | 1.84 | 8 |
| Ricardo Costa | Men's long jump T11 | 5.89 | 6 |
| Alessandro Rodrigo Silva | Men's shot put F11 | 13.89 | 2nd place, silver medalist(s) |
| Alessandro Rodrigo Silva | Men's discus throw F11 | 43.16 | 1st place, gold medalist(s) |
| Rodrigo Parreira | Men's long jump T36 | 5.49 | 5 |
| Thiago Paulino | Men's shot put F57 | 14.77 | 3rd place, bronze medalist(s) |
| Wallace Santos | Men's shot put F55 | 12.63 | 1st place, gold medalist(s) |

Women's track

| Athlete | Event | Heats/Semifinal | | Final | |
| Athlete | Event | Result | Rank | Result | Rank |
|---|---|---|---|---|---|
| Ana Cláudia Silva | Women's 100m T63 | 16.63 | 10 | did not advance | |
| Edilene Teixeira | Women's marathon T12 | —N/a | | 3:26:32 | 7 |
| Edneusa Dorta | Women's 1500 metres T13 | 5:12:12 | 6 | did not advance | |
| Edneusa Dorta | Women's marathon T12 | —N/a | | 3:15:32 | 4 |
| Fernanda Yara da Silva | Women's 100m T47 | 13.03 | 9 | did not advance | |
| Fernanda Yara da Silva | Women's 200m T47 | 26.65 | 9 | did not advance | |
| Fernanda Yara da Silva | Women's 400m T47 | 59.91 | 3 Q | DSQ | – |
| Jardênia Félix | Women's 400m T20 | 59.14 | 2 Q | 57.43 | 3rd place, bronze medalist(s) |
| Jerusa Geber | Women's 100m T11 | 12.41 | 2 | DSQ | – |
| Jerusa Geber | Women's 200m T11 | 25.86 | 2 Q | 25.19 | 3rd place, bronze medalist(s) |
| Jhulia Santos | Women's 400m T11 | 59.17 | 5 | did not advance | |
| Kétyla Teodoro | Women's 200m T12 | 26.74 | 9 | did not advance | |
| Kétyla Teodoro | Women's 400m T12 | DSQ | – | did not advance | |
| Lorena Salvatini Spoladore | Women's 100m T11 | 12.48 | 4 | did not advance | |
| Lorena Salvatini Spoladore | Women's 200m T11 | 26.20; 25.95 | 6 q | did not advance | |
| Rayane Soares | Women's 100m T13 | 12.39 | 2 Q | 12.52 | 8 |
| Rayane Soares | Women's 400m T13 | 59.54 | 11 | did not advance | |
| Samira da Silva | Women's 100m T36 | 15.05 | 5 Q | 15.27 | 7 |
| Samira da Silva | Women's 200m T36 | 31.82 | 3 Q | 31.92 | 6 |
| Silvânia Costa de Oliveira | Women's 400m T11 | DNF | – | did not advance | |
| Táscitha Oliveira Cruz | Women's 100m T36 | 15.72 | 9 | did not advance | |
| Táscitha Oliveira Cruz | Women's 200m T36 | 32.30 | 5 q | 32.91 | 7 |
| Thalita Simplício | Women's 100m T11 | 12.41 | 2 | DSQ | – |
| Thalita Simplício | Women's 200m T11 | 25.45 | 1 Q | 24.94 | 2nd place, silver medalist(s) |
| Thalita Simplício | Women's 400m T11 | 57.90 | 1 Q | 56.80 | 2nd place, silver medalist(s) |
| Vanessa Cristina de Souza | Women's 1500 metres T54 | 3:30.06 | 7q | 3:30.55 | 8 |
| Vanessa Cristina de Souza | Women's 5000 metres T54 | —N/a | | 11:18.02 | 8 |
| Vanessa Cristina de Souza | Women's marathon T54 | —N/a | | 1:51:12 | 12 |
| Viviane Ferreira | Women's 100m T12 | 12.81 | 11 | did not advance | |
| Viviane Ferreira | Women's 200m T12 | 26.61 | 10 | did not advance | |

Women's field

| Athlete | Event | Final | |
| Athlete | Event | Result | Rank |
|---|---|---|---|
| Ana Cláudia Silva | Women's long jump T63 | 3.63 | 10 |
| Elizabeth Rodrigues | Women's discus throw F53 | 17.62 | 1st place, gold medalist(s) |
| Izabela Campos | Women's shot put F12 | 9.41 | 10 |
| Izabela Campos | Women's discus throw F11 | 32.26 | 7 |
| Jardênia Félix | Women's long jump T20 | 5.29 | 5 |
| Julyana da Silva | Women's shot put F57 | 9.45 | 7 |
| Julyana da Silva | Women's discus throw F57 | 30.49 | 3rd place, bronze medalist(s) |
| Leylane Moura | Women's shot put F33 | 5.61 | 5 |
| Lorena Salvatini Spoladore | Women's long jump T11 | 4.77 | 4 |
| Marivana Oliveira | Women's shot put F35 | 9.15 | 2nd place, silver medalist(s) |
| Poliana Jesus | Women's shot put F54 | 5.68 | 7 |
| Poliana Jesus | Women's javelin throw F54 | 13.69 | 7 |
| Raíssa Rocha Machado | Women's javelin throw F56 | 24.39 | 2nd place, silver medalist(s) |
| Silvânia Costa de Oliveira | Women's long jump T11 | 5.00 | 1st place, gold medalist(s) |
| Tuany Siqueira | Women's shot put F57 | 9.87 | 6 |
| Tuany Siqueira | Women's discus throw F57 | 21.30 | 11 |

== Badminton ==
| Athlete | Event | Group stage | | | Semifinal | Final / BM | |
| Athlete | Event | Opposition Score | Opposition Score | Rank | Opposition Score | Opposition Score | Rank |
|---|---|---|---|---|---|---|---|
| Vitor Gonçalves Tavares | Men's singles SH6 | Taresoh (MAS); W 2–0 (21–13, 18–13^{r}) | Nagar (IND); L 0–2 (17–21, 14–21) | 2 Q | Chu (HKG); L 1–2 (21–15, 18–21, 10–21) | Coombs (GBR); L 1–2 – (21–15, 10–21, 16–21) | 4 |

== Boccia ==
Individual

| Athlete | Event | Pool matches | | | | | Quarterfinals | Semifinals | Final / BM | |
| Athlete | Event | Opposition Score | Opposition Score | Opposition Score | Opposition Score | Rank | Opposition Score | Opposition Score | Opposition Score | Rank |
|---|---|---|---|---|---|---|---|---|---|---|
| José Carlos Chagas | Mixed individual BC1 | Ramos (POR); W 6–1 | Fujii (JPN); W 5–2 | Kral (SVK); W 4–2 | —N/a | 1 Q | Perez (NED); W 4–2 | Smith (GBR); L 4–7 | Ramos (POR); W 8–2 | 3rd place, bronze medalist(s) |
| Guilherme Moraes | Mixed individual BC1 | Perez (NED); L 1–13 | Dolgova (RPC); L 1–4 | Gutnik (RPC); L 3–4 | Tipmanee (THA); W 4–1 | 5 | did not advance | | | |
| Andreza Vitória | Mixed individual BC1 | Huadpradit (THA); L 4–5 | Chew (MAS); L 2–5 | Jung (KOR); L 2–4 | Curinova (CZE); L 1–3 | 5 | did not advance | | | |
| Natali de Faria | Mixed individual BC2 | Levi (ISR); L 0–8 | W. Vongsa (THA); L 0–14 | Fernandes (POR); L 1–3 | —N/a | 5 | did not advance | | | |
| Maciel Santos | Mixed individual BC2 | Lee (KOR); W 11–0 | Cristaldo (ARG); W 6–1 | Tagart (GBR); W 8–1 | —N/a | 1 Q | Yeung (HKG); W 6–2 | Sugimura (JPN); L 2–3 | Saengampa (THA); W 4–3 | 3rd place, bronze medalist(s) |
| Mateus Carvalho | Mixed individual BC3 | Kawamoto (JPN); L 2–4 | Tse (HKG); L 3–3* | Jeong (KOR); L 1–3 | —N/a | 4 | did not advance | | | |
| Evani Soares da Silva | Mixed individual BC3 | Macedo (POR); L 3–4 | Ho (HKG); L 1–8 | Kim (KOR); L 0–6 | —N/a | 4 | did not advance | | | |
| Evelyn de Oliveira | Mixed individual BC3 | Bjurstrom (SWE); W 4–2 | Chaipanich (THA); W 8–1 | Michel (AUS); W 3–2 | —N/a | 1 Q | McCowan (GBR); L 1–9 | did not advance | | |
| Marcelo dos Santos | Mixed individual BC4 | Santos (BRA); L 3–3* | Leung (HKG); L 0–14 | Safin (RPC); L 7–11 | —N/a | 4 | did not advance | | | |
| Eliseu dos Santos | Mixed individual BC4 | Santos (BRA); W 3*-3 | Safin (RPC); W 7–3 | Leung (HKG); W 6–4 | —N/a | 1 Q | Zheng (CHN); L 3–3* | did not advance | | |

Pairs and teams

| Athlete | Event | Pool matches | | | | | Quarterfinals | Semifinals | Final / BM | |
| Athlete | Event | Opposition Score | Opposition Score | Opposition Score | Opposition Score | Rank | Opposition Score | Opposition Score | Opposition Score | Rank |
|---|---|---|---|---|---|---|---|---|---|---|
| Andreza Vitória; José Carlos Chagas; Maciel Santos; Natali de Faria | Mixed team BC1–2 | Portugal (POR); L 2–9 | Slovakia (SVK); W 5–4 | South Korea (KOR); W 6–3 | Japan (JPN); L 4–6 | 3 | did not advance | | | |
| Mateus Carvalho; Evani Soares da Silva; Evelyn de Oliveira | Mixed pairs BC3 | Portugal (POR); W 7–3 | Hong Kong (HKG); W 5–3 | Australia (AUS); L 2–5 | Japan (JPN); L 3–3* | 4 | did not advance | | | |
| Ercileide da Silva; Eliseu dos Santos; Marcelo dos Santos | Mixed pairs BC4 | Slovakia (SVK); L 3–7 | Great Britain (GBR); L 4–6 | Canada (CAN); W 4–3 | Portugal (POR); L 2–3 | 4 | did not advance | | | |

== Cycling ==
Brazil competed in cycling at the 2020 Summer Paralympics.

=== Road ===
| Athlete | Event | Time | Rank |
|---|---|---|---|
| Lauro César Chaman | Men's road race C4–5 | 2:17:11 | 4 |
| Lauro César Chaman | Men's time trial C5 | 43:44.37 | 4 |
| André Grizante | Men's road race C4–5 | -1 LAP | 17 |
| André Grizante | Men's time trial C4 | 52:41.83 | 9 |
| Carlos Alberto Gomes Soares | Men's road race C1–3 | + 1 LAP | 31 |
| Carlos Alberto Gomes Soares | Men's time trial C1 | 28:13.44 | 8 |
| Ana Raquel Montenegro | Women's road race C4–5 | +1 LAP | 14 |
| Ana Raquel Montenegro | Women's time trial C5 | 53:30.61 | 9 |
| Jady Martins Malavazzi | Women's road race H1–4 | 1:06:43 | 13 |
| Jady Martins Malavazzi | Women's time trial H1–3 | 38:11.10 | 7 |

=== Track ===
| Athlete | Event | Qualification | | Final | |
| Athlete | Event | Time | Rank | Opposition Time | Rank |
|---|---|---|---|---|---|
| Lauro César Chaman | Men's individual pursuit C5 | 4:25.694 | 6 | did not advance | |
| Lauro César Chaman | Men's time trial C4–5 | —N/a | | 1:06.421 | 9 |
| Carlos Alberto Gomes Soares | Men's individual pursuit C1 | 4:26.763 | 10 | did not advance | |
| Carlos Alberto Gomes Soares | Men's time trial C1–3 | —N/a | | 1:18.891 | 20 |
| André Grizante | Men's individual pursuit C4 | 5:01.461 | 7 | did not advance | |
| André Grizante | Men's time trial C4–5 | —N/a | | 1:12.640 | 21 |
| Ana Raquel Montenegro | Women's individual pursuit C5 | 4:43.704 | 9 | did not advance | |
| Ana Raquel Montenegro | Women's time trial C4–5 | —N/a | | 44.157 | 11 |

== Equestrian ==
Individual

| Athlete | Horse | Event | Total | |
| Athlete | Horse | Event | Score | Rank |
|---|---|---|---|---|
| Sérgio Fróes Ribeiro de Oliva | Coco Chanel | Individual championship test grade I | 69.643 | 10 |
| Rodolpho Riskalla | Warenne | Individual championship test grade IV | 74.659 | 2nd place, silver medalist(s) |

== Football 5-a-side ==
Brazil have qualified after defeating Argentina in the final of the 2018 IBSA World Blind Football Championship. The following is the Brazil squad in the football 5-a-side tournament of the 2020 Summer Paralympics.

| No. | Pos. | Player | Class | Date of birth (age) |
|---|---|---|---|---|
| 1 | GK | Luan | Sighted | 6 January 1993 (aged 28) |
| 4 | DF | Damião | B1 | 28 December 1974 (aged 46) |
| 5 | DF | Cássio | B1 | 15 May 1989 (aged 32) |
| 6 | MF | Jardiel | B1 | 26 July 1996 (aged 25) |
| 7 | MF | Jefinho | B1 | 5 October 1989 (aged 31) |
| 8 | FW | Nonato | B1 | 19 August 1987 (aged 34) |
| 9 | FW | Tiago | B1 | 28 September 1995 (aged 25) |
| 10 | MF | Ricardinho | B1 | 15 December 1988 (aged 32) |
| 11 | FW | Gledson da Paixão Barros | B1 | 10 September 1990 (aged 30) |
| 12 | GK | Matheus Bumussa | Sighted | 3 October 1994 (aged 26) |

Group stage

| Pos | Team | Pld | W | D | L | GF | GA | GD | Pts | Qualification |
|---|---|---|---|---|---|---|---|---|---|---|
| 1 | Brazil | 3 | 3 | 0 | 0 | 11 | 0 | +11 | 9 | Semi finals |
| 2 | China | 3 | 2 | 0 | 1 | 3 | 3 | 0 | 6 | Semi finals |
| 3 | Japan | 3 | 1 | 0 | 2 | 4 | 6 | −2 | 3 | 5th–6th place match |
| 4 | France | 3 | 0 | 0 | 3 | 0 | 9 | −9 | 0 | 7th–8th place match |

Source: TOCOG
29 August 2021
11:30

| Brazil | 3–0 | China |
|---|---|---|
| Nonato 15', 36'; Cássio 25' (pen.) | Report |

Aomi Urban Sports Park, Tokyo
Referee: François Carcouët (France)

30 August 2021
11:30

| Brazil | 4–0 | Japan |
|---|---|---|
| Nonato 5'; Tiago Paraná 25'; Ricardinho 36', 39' | Report |

Aomi Urban Sports Park, Tokyo
Referee: Germinal Lubrano (Argentina)

31 August 2021
11:30

| France | 0–4 | Brazil |
|---|---|---|
| | Report | Nonato 16', 26' (pen.); Jardiel 35', 39' |

Aomi Urban Sports Park, Tokyo
Referee: Attila Balint (Hungary)

Semi-finals

2 September 2021
19:30

| Brazil | 1–0 | Morocco |
|---|---|---|
| Berka 28' (o.g.) | Report |

Aomi Urban Sports Park, Tokyo
Referee: François Carcouët (France)

Gold medal match

4 September 2021
17:30

| Argentina | 0–1 | Brazil |
|---|---|---|
| | Report | Nonato 33' |

Aomi Urban Sports Park, Tokyo
Referee: François Carcouët (France)

== Goalball ==
Brazil have qualified one male and one female teams to the Paralympics after being in the top three in the 2018 IBSA World Goalball Championships in Malmö, Sweden.

=== Men's tournament ===
The following is the Brazil roster in the men's goalball tournament of the 2020 Summer Paralympics.

| No. | Player | Class | Date of birth (age) |
|---|---|---|---|
| 1 | José Roberto Oliveira | B1 | 2 April 1981 (aged 40) |
| 2 | Alex de Melo | B2 | 10 December 1994 (aged 26) |
| 4 | Leomon Moreno | B1 | 21 August 1993 (aged 28) |
| 5 | Josemárcio Sousa | B3 | 8 September 1995 (aged 25) |
| 6 | Romário Marques | B1 | 20 July 1989 (aged 32) |
| 9 | Emerson da Silva | B3 | 11 February 1999 (aged 22) |

Group stage

| Pos | Team | Pld | W | D | L | GF | GA | GD | Pts | Qualification |
|---|---|---|---|---|---|---|---|---|---|---|
| 1 | Japan (H) | 4 | 3 | 0 | 1 | 37 | 15 | +22 | 9 | Quarter-finals |
| 2 | Brazil | 4 | 3 | 0 | 1 | 35 | 17 | +18 | 9 | Quarter-finals |
| 3 | United States | 4 | 2 | 0 | 2 | 25 | 35 | −10 | 6 | Quarter-finals |
| 4 | Lithuania | 4 | 1 | 1 | 2 | 24 | 31 | −7 | 4 | Quarter-finals |
| 5 | Algeria | 4 | 0 | 1 | 3 | 20 | 43 | −23 | 1 | |

Source: TOCOG
(H) Hosts

| 25 August 2021; 09:00 | Brazil | 11–2 | Lithuania | Makuhari Messe, Tokyo; Referees: Robert Avery (Great Britain), Warrick Jackes (Australia) |
| 25 August 2021; 09:00 | Marques 4 Moreno 3 Sousa 3 Da Silva 1 | Report | Pavliukianec 1 Zibolis 1 | Makuhari Messe, Tokyo; Referees: Robert Avery (Great Britain), Warrick Jackes (Australia) |

| 26 August 2021; 13:15 | United States | 8–6 | Brazil | Makuhari Messe, Tokyo; Referees: Reza Dehghan (Iran), Robert Avery (Great Britain) |
| 26 August 2021; 13:15 | Young 4 Merren 1 Simpson 1 Walker 1 Sousa 1 (o.g.) | Report | Moreno 3 Sousa 2 Marques 1 | Makuhari Messe, Tokyo; Referees: Reza Dehghan (Iran), Robert Avery (Great Britain) |

| 27 August 2021; 20:30 | Brazil | 10–4 | Algeria | Makuhari Messe, Tokyo; Referees: Robert Avery (Great Britain), Raquel Gomez Aguado (Spain) |
| 27 August 2021; 20:30 | Moreno 5 Sousa 4 De Melo 1 | Report | Belhouchat 4 | Makuhari Messe, Tokyo; Referees: Robert Avery (Great Britain), Raquel Gomez Aguado (Spain) |

| 29 August 2021; 09:00 | Japan | 3–8 | Brazil | Makuhari Messe, Tokyo; Referees: Reza Dehghan (Iran), Launel Scott (Canada) |
| 29 August 2021; 09:00 | Yamaguchi 2 Sano 1 | Report | Sousa 5 Moreno 3 | Makuhari Messe, Tokyo; Referees: Reza Dehghan (Iran), Launel Scott (Canada) |

Quarter-finals

| 31 August 2021; 19:30 | Brazil | 9–4 | Turkey | Makuhari Messe, Tokyo; Referees: Yoshinori Nii (Japan), Romualdas Vaitiekus (Lithuania) |
| 31 August 2021; 19:30 | Moreno 6 Sousa 3 | Report | Gündoğdu 4 | Makuhari Messe, Tokyo; Referees: Yoshinori Nii (Japan), Romualdas Vaitiekus (Lithuania) |

Semi-finals

| 2 September 2021; 17:45 | Lithuania | 5–9 | Brazil | Makuhari Messe, Tokyo; Referees: Yoshinori Nii (Japan), Warrick Jackes (Australia) |
| 2 September 2021; 17:45 | Pavliukianec 2 Jonikaitis 1 Pažarauskas 1 Zibolis 1 | Report | Sousa 6 Moreno 2 Marques 1 | Makuhari Messe, Tokyo; Referees: Yoshinori Nii (Japan), Warrick Jackes (Australia) |

Gold medal match

| 3 September 2021; 19:30 | China | 2–7 | Brazil | Makuhari Messe, Tokyo; Referees: Yoshinori Nii (Japan), Romualdas Vaitiekus (Lithuania) |
| 3 September 2021; 19:30 | Yang Mingyuan 2 | Report | Moreno 3 Sousa 3 Marques 1 | Makuhari Messe, Tokyo; Referees: Yoshinori Nii (Japan), Romualdas Vaitiekus (Lithuania) |

=== Women's tournament ===
The following is the Brazil roster in the women's goalball tournament of the 2020 Summer Paralympics.

| No. | Player | Class | Date of birth (age) |
|---|---|---|---|
| 2 | Ana Gabriely Assunção | B3 | 15 August 1990 (aged 30) |
| 3 | Ana Carolina Custódio | B2 | 23 April 1987 (aged 33) |
| 5 | Moniza Aparecida de Lima | B2 | 16 April 1998 (aged 22) |
| 7 | Kátia Aparecida Ferreira Silva | B1 | 24 April 1995 (aged 25) |
| 8 | Jéssica Gomes | B3 | 22 July 1993 (aged 27) |
| 9 | Victória Amorim | B1 | 29 November 1997 (aged 22) |

Group stage

| Pos | Team | Pld | W | D | L | GF | GA | GD | Pts | Qualification |
|---|---|---|---|---|---|---|---|---|---|---|
| 1 | Turkey | 4 | 3 | 0 | 1 | 30 | 11 | +19 | 9 | Quarterfinals |
| 2 | United States | 4 | 3 | 0 | 1 | 22 | 10 | +12 | 9 | Quarterfinals |
| 3 | Japan (H) | 4 | 2 | 1 | 1 | 18 | 13 | +5 | 7 | Quarterfinals |
| 4 | Brazil | 4 | 1 | 1 | 2 | 23 | 19 | +4 | 4 | Quarterfinals |
| 5 | Egypt | 4 | 0 | 0 | 4 | 3 | 43 | −40 | 0 | |

Source: TOCOG
Rules for classification: 1) points; 2) goal difference; 3) number of wins; 4) goals against; 5) head-to-head goal difference.
(H) Hosts
25 August 2021
20:30

| Brazil | 4–6 | United States |
|---|---|---|
| Custodio 1'; Amorim 9'; Gomes 16', 19' | Report | Czechowski 2'; Dennis 2', 14', 21'; Mason 5', 8' |

Makuhari Messe, Tokyo
Referee: Warrick Jackes (Australia), Vaida Pokvytytė (Lithuania)

27 August 2021
10:30

| Japan | 4–4 | Brazil |
|---|---|---|
| Temma 1'; Hagiwara 7', 10', 16' | Report | Custodio 14', 21'; Amorim 16', 21' |

Makuhari Messe, Tokyo
Referee: Raquel Aguado Gómez (Spain), Svitlana Moroz (Ukraine)

28 August 2021
20:30

| Turkey | 8–4 | Brazil |
|---|---|---|
| Sevd. Altunoluk 1', 1', 5', 16', 17', 23'; Güler 2', 3' | Report | Amorim 6', 10'; Custodio 13', 15' |

Makuhari Messe, Tokyo
Referee: Svitlana Moroz (Ukraine), Raili Sipura (Finland)

30 August 2021
10:30

| Brazil | 11–1 | Egypt |
|---|---|---|
| Gomes 1', 6', 7', 9', 11', 12', 15', 16'; Ferreira 13', 14'; Custodio 15' | Report | Elgabry 12' |

Makuhari Messe, Tokyo
Referee: Launel Scott (Canada), Woradet Kultawongwattana (Thailand)

Quarterfinal

1 September 2021
17:45

| China | 0–1 (2OT) | Brazil |
|---|---|---|
| | Report | Custodio 28' |

Makuhari Messe, Tokyo
Referee: Yoshinori Nii (Japan), Reza Dehghan (Iran)

Semifinal

2 September 2021
19:30

| Brazil | 4–5 (ET) | United States |
|---|---|---|
| Gomes 7', 9'; Custodio 1 ET; Aparecida de Lima 1 ET | Report | Dennis 22', 24', 1 ET; Czechowski 1 ET; Mason 1 ET |

Makuhari Messe, Tokyo
Referee: Vaida Pokvytytė (Lithuania), Robert Avery (Great Britain)

Bronze medal match

3 September 2021
13:15

| Brazil | 1–6 | Japan |
|---|---|---|
| Amorim 22' | Report | Kakehata 2', 4', 12'; Hagiwara 4', 10', 20' |

Makuhari Messe, Tokyo
Referee: Vaida Pokvytytė (Lithuania), Raili Sipura (Finland)

== Judo ==
Men

| Athlete | Event | Round of 16 | Quarterfinals | Semifinals | Repechage First round | Repechage Final | Final / BM | |
| Athlete | Event | Opposition Result | Opposition Result | Opposition Result | Opposition Result | Opposition Result | Opposition Result | Rank |
|---|---|---|---|---|---|---|---|---|
| Thiego Marques | Men's −60 kg | Hirai (JPN); L 000–100 | did not advance | | | | | |
| Harlley Pereira | Men's −81 kg | Powell (GBR); L 000–100 | did not advance | | | | | |
| Arthur Cavalcante | Men's −90 kg | Espinoza Rodriguez (VEN); W 10–00 | Nouri (IRI); L 000–101 | Bye | | Hirose (JPN); W 10–00 | Nazarenko (UKR); L 00–10 | 5 |
| Antônio Tenório | Men's −100 kg | Bye | Basoc (MDA); W 100–00 | Goodrich (USA); L 00–10 | Bye | | Khalilov (UZB); L 01–10 | 5 |
| Wilians Silva de Araújo | Men's +100 kg | Fernandez Sastre (CUB); L 0–10 | did not advance | | | | | |

Women

| Athlete | Event | Quarterfinals | Semifinals | Repechage | Final / BM | |
| Athlete | Event | Opposition Result | Opposition Result | Opposition Result | Opposition Result | Rank |
|---|---|---|---|---|---|---|
| Karla Cardoso | Women's −52 kg | Brussig (GER); L 010–100 | Did not advance | Stepaniuk (ROC); L 002–101 | Did not advance | 7 |
| Lúcia Teixeira | Women's −57 kg | Gonzalez (ARG); W 100–000 | Samandarova (UZB); L 000–11 | Bye | Ovchinnikova (ROC); W 101–01 | 3rd place, bronze medalist(s) |
| Alana Maldonado | Women's −70 kg | Lauria (ITA); W 100–000 | Ulucam (TUR); W 100–000 | Bye | Kaldani (GEO); W 101–000 | 1st place, gold medalist(s) |
| Meg Emmerich | Women's +70 kg | Tsuchiya (JPN); W 100–000 | Karimova (AZE); L 11–112 | Bye | Niamma (MGL); W 101–01 | 3rd place, bronze medalist(s) |

== Paracanoeing ==
| Athlete | Event | Heats | | Semifinal | | Final | |
| Athlete | Event | Time | Rank | Time | Rank | Time | Rank |
|---|---|---|---|---|---|---|---|
| Luis Cardoso da Silva | Men's KL1 | 49.840 | 1 FA | —N/a | | 48.031 | 2nd place, silver medalist(s) |
| Luis Cardoso da Silva | Men's VL2 | 58.000 | 5 SF | 57.725 | 3 FA | 56.390 | 7 |
| Fernando Rufino de Paulo | Men's KL2 | 43.860 | 2 | 42.209 | 2 FA | 43.217 | 6 |
| Fernando Rufino de Paulo | Men's VL2 | 55.258 | 1 FA | —N/a | | 53.077 | 1st place, gold medalist(s) |
| Giovane Vieira de Paula | Men's KL3 | 44.144 | 7 | 45.556 | 6 FB | 43.508 | 10 |
| Giovane Vieira de Paula | Men's VL3 | 53.435 | 3 | 51.087 | 1 FA | 52.148 | 2nd place, silver medalist(s) |
| Caio Ribeiro de Carvalho | Men's KL3 | 41.687 | 2 | 40.717 | 1 FA | 42.005 | 5 |
| Caio Ribeiro de Carvalho | Men's VL3 | 55.691 | 4 | 51.315 | 2 FA | 53.246 | 7 |
| Adriana Azevedo | Women's KL1 | 1:04.554 | 5 | 1:05.564 | 4 | did not advance | |
| Mari Christina Santilli | Women's KL3 | 54.340 | 4 | 52.172 | 6 FA | 54.093 | 8 |
| Débora Ribeiro | Women's VL2 | 1:05.923 | 4 | 1:03.230 | 3 | 1:04.778 | 7 |

Qualification Legend: FA = Qualify to medal final; SF = Qualify to semifinal

== Paratriathlon ==
| Athlete | Event | Swim | Trans 1 | Bike | Trans 2 | Run | Total time | Rank |
|---|---|---|---|---|---|---|---|---|
| Ronan Cordeiro | Men's PTS5 | 10:32 | 00:47 | 31:29 | 00:51 | 17:43 | 1:01:22 | 5 |
| Carlos Viana | Men's PTS5 | 11:32 | 00:50 | 31:05 | 00:41 | 18:18 | 1:02:26 | 6 |
| Jorge Fonseca | Men's PTS4 | 12:53 | 1:09 | 33:10 | 00:57 | 19:48 | 1:07.57 | 7 |
| Jéssica Messali | Women's PTWC | 16:31 | 2:12 | 40:26 | 1:13 | 16:01 | 1:16:23 | 4 |

== Powerlifting ==
| Athlete | Event | Total lifted | Rank |
|---|---|---|---|
| Ailton de Andrade | Men's –80 kg | 182 | 8 |
| Bruno Carra | Men's –54 kg | NM | - |
| Evânio da Silva | Men's –88 kg | NM | - |
| João França Junior | Men's –49 kg | 144 | 6 |
| Mariana D'Andrea | Women's –73 kg | 137 | 1st place, gold medalist(s) |
| Tayana Medeiros | Women's –86 kg | 121 | 5 |
| Lara Aparecida | Women's –41 kg | 88 | 7 |

== Rowing ==
Brazil qualified four boats for all rowing classes into the Paralympic regatta. Two crews (men's single and mixed double sculls) qualified after successfully entering the top seven for men's single sculls and top eight for mixed double sculls at the 2019 World Rowing Championships in Ottensheim, Austria. Meanwhile, two more crews, qualified after women's single sculls win the 2021 Final Paralympic Qualification Regatta, in Gavirate, Italy, and mixed coxed four after winning the silver medal.

| Athlete | Event | Heats | | Repechage | | Final | |
| Athlete | Event | Time | Rank | Time | Rank | Time | Rank |
|---|---|---|---|---|---|---|---|
| Renê Pereira | Men's single sculls | 9:57.59 | FA | —N/a | | 10:03.54 | 3rd place, bronze medalist(s) |
| Cláudia Santos | Women's single sculls | 12:28.11 | 4 | 11:25.50 | 2 FA | 12:57.80 | 6 FA |
| Josiane Lima; Michel Pessanha | Mixed double sculls | 9:19.28 | 5 | 8:25.16 | 3 FB | 9:05.60 | 2 FB |
| Ana Paula Souza; Diana Barcelos; Jairo Klug; Valdeni Junior (cox) | Mixed coxed four | 7:56.75 | 6 | 7:15.77 | 3 FB | 7:46.67 | 4 FB |

Qualification Legend: FA=Final A (medal); FB=Final B (non-medal); R=Repechage

== Shooting ==
Brazil entered one athletes into the Paralympic competition. Alexandre Galgani successfully break the Paralympic qualification at the 2019 WSPS World Cup which was held in Al Ain, United Arab Emirates.

| Athlete | Event | Qualification | | Final | |
| Athlete | Event | Score | Rank | Score | Rank |
|---|---|---|---|---|---|
| Alexandre Galgani | Mixed R4 – 10 m air rifle prone SH2 | 622.0 | 22 | did not advance | |
| Alexandre Galgani | Mixed R5 – 10 m air rifle prone SH2 | 633.9 | 10 | did not advance | |
| Alexandre Galgani | Mixed R9 – 50 m air rifle prone SH2 | 618.0 | 16 | did not advance | |

== Swimming ==
36 Brazilian swimmers will compete in swimming at the 2020 Summer Paralympics

Men

| Athlete | Event | Heats | | Final | |
| Athlete | Event | Result | Rank | Result | Rank |
|---|---|---|---|---|---|
| Andrey Garbe | Men's 100 metre backstroke S9 | 1:07.54 | 11 | did not advance | |
| Bruno Becker | Men's 50m breaststroke SB2 | 1:48.10 | 10 | did not advance | |
| Bruno Becker | Men's 200m freestyle S2 | 4:30.84 | 4 Q | 4:22.63 | 4 |
| Bruno Becker | Men's 50 metre freestyle S3 | 1:01.30 | 14 | did not advance | |
| Caio Amorim | Men's 100 metre freestyle S8 | 1:03.04 | 17 | did not advance | |
| Caio Amorim | Men's 400 metre freestyle S8 | 4:38.44 | 5 Q | 4:35.16 | 6 |
| Daniel Dias | Men's 200m freestyle S5 | 2:45.16 | 3 Q | 2:38.61 | 3rd place, bronze medalist(s) |
| Daniel Dias | Men's 50m butterfly S5 | 37.27 | 7 Q | 36.56 | 6 |
| Daniel Dias | Men's 50m freestyle S5 | 32.65 | 3 | 32.12 | 4 |
| Daniel Dias | Men's 50m backstroke S5 | 37.19 | 5 | 35.99 | 5 |
| Daniel Dias | Men's 100m freestyle S5 | 1:13.02 | 2 Q | 1:10.80 | 3rd place, bronze medalist(s) |
| Douglas Matera | Men's 50m freestyle S13 | 25.14 | 12 | did not advance | |
| Douglas Matera | Men's 100m butterfly S13 | 58.66 | 6 Q | 58.53 | 7 |
| Douglas Matera | Men's 200m freestyle SM13 | 2:23.53 | 13 | did not advance | |
| Eric Tobera | Men's 50 metre breaststroke SB3 | 57.37 | 10 | did not advance | |
| Eric Tobera | Men's 50 metre freestyle S4 | 41.34 | 8 Q | 41.46 | 6 |
| Eric Tobera | Men's 100 metre freestyle S4 | 1:36.20 | 10 | did not advance | |
| Eric Tobera | Men's 200 metre freestyle S4 | DNS | – | | |
| Felipe Vila Real | Men's 200m freestyle S14 | 2:02.13 | 11 | did not advance | |
| Gabriel Araújo | Men's 100m backstroke S2 | 2:09.73 | 4 Q | 2:02.47 | 2nd place, silver medalist(s) |
| Gabriel Araújo | Men's 200m freestyle S2 | 4:24.32 | 3 Q | 4:06.52 | 1st place, gold medalist(s) |
| Gabriel Araújo | Men's 50m backstroke S2 | 56.82 | 1 Q | 53.96 | 1st place, gold medalist(s) |
| Gabriel Bandeira | Men's 200m freestyle S14 | 1:57.73 | 3 Q | 1:52.74 | 2nd place, silver medalist(s) |
| Gabriel Bandeira | Men's 100m backstroke S14 | 1:01.63 | 9 | did not advance | |
| Gabriel Bandeira | Men's 100m butterfly S14 | 56.78 | 2 Q | 54.76 | 1st place, gold medalist(s) |
| Gabriel Bandeira | Men's 100m breaststroke SB14 | 1:10.43 | 10 | did not advance | |
| Gabriel Bandeira | Men's 200m individual medley SM14 | 2:15.35 | 6 Q | 2:09.56 | 2nd place, silver medalist(s) |
| Gabriel Cristiano Souza | Men's 100m freestyle S8 | 1:02.30 | 15 | did not advance | |
| Gabriel Cristiano Souza | Men's 100m butterfly S8 | 1:05.55 | 8 Q | 1:05.38 | 8 |
| Gabriel Cristiano Souza | Men's 50m freestyle S9 | 27.29 | 19 | did not advance | |
| Gabriel Melone | Men's 50 metre butterfly S6 | 32.93 | 6Q | 33.01 | 7 |
| Gabriel Melone | Men's 100 metre freestyle S6 | 1:12.63 | 13 | did not advance | |
| Gabriel Melone | Men's 100 metre backstroke S6 | 1:24.72 | 13 | did not advance | |
| João Pedro Brutus | Men's 100m breaststroke SB14 | 1:08.32 | 7 Q | 1:07.84 | 7 |
| João Pedro Brutus | Men's 200 metre individual medley SM14 | 2:21.20 | 16 | did not advance | |
| José Ronaldo da Silva | Men's 50 metre backstroke S1 | —N/a | | 1:21.57 | 4 |
| José Ronaldo da Silva | Men's 100 metre backstroke S1 | —N/a | | 3:03.18 | 5 |
| Matheus Rheine | Men's 100m freestyle S11 | 27.17 | 4 Q | 27.26 | 6 |
| Matheus Rheine | Men's 100m butterfly S11 | 1:24.69 | 13 | did not advance | |
| Matheus Rheine | Men's 400m freestyle S11 | 4:52.38 | 5 Q | 4:44.64 | 5 |
| Phelipe Rodrigues | Men's 50m freestyle S10 | 23.74 | 3 Q | 23.50 | 3rd place, bronze medalist(s) |
| Phelipe Rodrigues | Men's 100m butterfly S10 | 1:01.00 | 11 | did not advance | |
| Phelipe Rodrigues | Men's 100m freestyle S10 | 53.44 | 5 Q | 52.04 | 4 |
| Roberto Alcalde | Men's 100m breaststroke SB5 | 1:35.66 | 6 Q | 1:36.75 | 7 |
| Roberto Alcalde | Men's 200 metre individual medley SM6 | 3:14.69 | 16 | did not advance | |
| Ronystony Cordeiro | Men's 50 metre breaststroke SB3 | 57.80 | 11 | did not advance | |
| Ronystony Cordeiro | Men's 50 metre freestyle S4 | 41.91 | 10 | did not advance | |
| Ronystony Cordeiro | Men's 50 metre backstroke S4 | 46.58 | 6Q | 46.95 | 8 |
| Ruan Souza | Men's 100m breaststroke SB9 | —N/a | | 1:10.99 | 5 |
| Ruan Souza | Men's 100m freestyle S10 | 56.88 | 12 | did not advance | |
| Ruan Souza | Men's 200 metre individual medley S10 | 2:27.75 | 10 | did not advance | |
| Ruiter Gonçalves | Men's 50 metre freestyle S9 | 26.70 | 16 | did not advance | |
| Ruiter Gonçalves | Men's 200 metre individual medley SM9 | 2:30.24 | 11 | did not advance | |
| Talisson Glock | Men's 50m butterfly S6 | 33.89 | | did not advance | |
| Talisson Glock | Men's 100m freestyle S6 | 1:05.94 | 2 Q | 1:05.45 | 3rd place, bronze medalist(s) |
| Talisson Glock | Men's 100m backstroke S6 | 1:27.36 | 18 | did not advance | |
| Talisson Glock | Men's 200m metre individual medley SM6 | 2:49.49 | 5 | 2:45.17 | 6 |
| Talisson Glock | Men's 400m freestyle S6 | 5:06.28 | 1 Q | 4:54.42 | 1st place, gold medalist(s) |
| Vanilton Filho | Men's 50 metre freestyle S9 | 26.99 | 18 | did not advance | |
| Vanilton Filho | Men's 100 metre butterfly S9 | 1:07.04 | 17 | did not advance | |
| Wendell Belarmino | Men's 50m freestyle S11 | 26.47 | 2 Q | 26.03 | 1st place, gold medalist(s) |
| Wendell Belarmino | Men's 100 metre butterfly S11 | 1:06.59 | 4 Q | 1:05.20 | 3rd place, bronze medalist(s) |
| Wendell Belarmino | Men's 200 metre individual medley SM11 | 2:38.59 | 7 | 2:30.17 | 7 |
| Daniel Dias; André Brasil; Ruiter Silva; Phelipe Rodrigues | 4 × 100 m freestyle relay 34pts | —N/a | | 3:52.28 | 4 |
| Daniel Dias; André Brasil; Phelipe Rodrigues; Ruan Felipe Lima de Souza | 4 × 100 m medley relay 34pts | 4:38.44 | 5 Q | 4:24.61 | 7 |

Women

| Athlete | Event | Heats | | Final | |
| Athlete | Event | Result | Rank | Result | Rank |
|---|---|---|---|---|---|
| Ana Karolina Soares de Oliveira | Women's 100 metre backstroke S14 | 1:11.67 | 5 | 1:11.29 | 5 |
| Ana Karolina Soares de Oliveira | Women's 200 metre individual medley SM14 | 2:47.37 | 16 | did not advance | |
| Beatriz Carneiro | Women's 100m breaststroke SB14 | 1:18.34 | 3 Q | 1:17.61 | 3rd place, bronze medalist(s) |
| Beatriz Carneiro | Women's 200 metre individual medley SM14 | 2:48.48 | 17 | did not advance | |
| Cecília Jerônimo de Araújo | Women's 50m freestyle S8 | 31.40 | 2 Q | 30.83 | 2nd place, silver medalist(s) |
| Cecília Jerônimo de Araújo | Women's 100 metre butterfly S8 | —N/a | | 1:26.26 | 5 |
| Cecília Jerônimo de Araújo | Women's 100 metre freestyle S9 | 1:16.87 | 20 | did not advance | |
| Débora Carneiro | Women's 100m breaststroke SB14 | 1:18.55 | 5 Q | 1:17.63 | 4 |
| Débora Carneiro | Women's 200 metre individual medley SM14 | 2:48.58 | 18 | did not advance | |
| Edênia Garcia | Women's 50m backstroke S3 | 1:08.44 | 7 Q | 1:07.83 | 8 |
| Edênia Garcia | Women's 100 metre freestyle S3 | DNS | – | | |
| Esthefany Rodrigues | Women's 50 metre butterfly S5 | 47.24 | 7 Q | 46.49 | 7 |
| Esthefany Rodrigues | Women's 100m freestyle S5 | 1:36.45 | 13 | did not advance | |
| Esthefany Rodrigues | Women's 200m freestyle S5 | 3:27.41 | 9 | did not advance | |
| Esthefany Rodrigues | Women's 200 metre individual medley SM5 | —N/a | | 3:47.92 | 8 |
| Joana Maria Silva | Women's 50m butterfly S5 | 46.32 | 6 Q | 45.33 | 4 |
| Joana Maria Silva | Women's 100m freestyle S5 | 1:27.36 | 8 Q | 1:27.62 | 8 |
| Laila Suzigan | Women's 50 metre freestyle S6 | 36.51 | 11 | did not advance | |
| Laila Suzigan | Women's 400 metre freestyle S6 | 5:00.39 | 7 Q | | 8 |
| Laila Suzigan | Women's 100 metre freestyle S7 | 1:17.12 | 9 | did not advance | |
| Lucilene da Silva | Women's 50m freestyle S13 | 28.21 | 10 | did not advance | |
| Lucilene da Silva | Women's 100m freestyle S12 | 1:01.68 | 3 Q | 1:02.42 | 6 |
| Lucilene da Silva | Women's 100 metre breaststroke SB12 | —N/a | | 1:30.25 | 5 |
| Lucilene da Silva | Women's 100m butterfly S13 | 1:10.93 | 10 | did not advance | |
| Maiara Barreto | Women's 50m backstroke S3 | 1:00.80 | 5 Q | 59.50 | 4 |
| Maiara Barreto | Women's 100 metre freestyle S3 | 2:12.02 | 7 | 2:10.90 | 7 |
| Maria Carolina Gomes Santiago | Women's 50m freestyle S13 | 26.87 | 1 Q | 26.82 | 1st place, gold medalist(s) |
| Maria Carolina Gomes Santiago | Women's 100m freestyle S12 | 1:01.79 | 3 Q | 59.01 | 1st place, gold medalist(s) |
| Maria Carolina Gomes Santiago | Women's 100m backstroke S12 | —N/a | | 1:09.18 | 3rd place, bronze medalist(s) |
| Maria Carolina Gomes Santiago | Women's 100 metre breaststroke SB12 | —N/a | | 1:14.89 PR | 1st place, gold medalist(s) |
| Maria Carolina Gomes Santiago | Women's 100m butterfly S13 | 1:07.30 | 5 Q | 1:07.11 | 6 |
| Mariana Ribeiro | Women's 100 metre freestyle S9 | 1:03.56 | 1 Q | 1:03.39 | 3rd place, bronze medalist(s) |
| Mariana Ribeiro | Women's 100 metre backstroke S9 | DNS | – | | |
| Mariana Ribeiro | Women's 50 metre freestyle S10 | 28.41 | 4 Q | 28.58 | 5 |
| Patrícia Pereira | Women's 50 metre breaststroke SB3 | 1:03.37 | 3 | 1:01.82 | 4 |
| Patrícia Pereira | Women's 50m freestyle S4 | 41.62 | 2 | 41.56 | 4 |
| Susana Schnarndorf | Women's 150m individual medley SM4 | 3:06.54 | 5 Q | 3:11.54 | 8 |
| Susana Schnarndorf | Women's 50m freestyle S4 | 48.78 | 12 | did not advance | |
| Susana Schnarndorf | Women's 100m freestyle S5 | 1:50.65 | 16 | did not advance | |
| Susana Schnarndorf | Women's 50m backstroke S4 | 1:00.50 | 12 | did not advance | |

Mixed

| Athlete | Event | Heats | | Final | |
| Athlete | Event | Result | Rank | Result | Rank |
|---|---|---|---|---|---|
| Patrícia Pereira; Daniel Dias; Joana da Silva Neves; Talisson Glock | Mixed 4 × 50 metre freestyle relay 20pts | 2:38.01 | 6 | 2:24.82 | 3rd place, bronze medalist(s) |
| Gabriel Bandeira; Ana Karolina Soares de Oliveira; Débora Carneiro; Felipe Vila Real | Mixed 4 x 100 metre freestyle relay S14 | —N/a | | 3:51.23 | 3rd place, bronze medalist(s) |
| Wendell Belarmino; Douglas Matera; Lucilene da Silva; Maria Carolina Gomes Santiago | Mixed 4 x 100 metre freestyle relay 49pts | —N/a | | 3:54.95 | 2nd place, silver medalist(s) |

== Table tennis ==
Brazil entered ten athletes into the table tennis competition at the games. Eight qualified from 2019 Parapan American Games which was held in Lima, Peru and two others via World Ranking allocation.

Men

| Athlete | Event | Preliminaries | | | | Quarterfinals | Semifinals | Final / BM | |
| Athlete | Event | Opposition Result | Opposition Result | Opposition Result | Rank | Opposition Result | Opposition Result | Opposition Result | Rank |
|---|---|---|---|---|---|---|---|---|---|
| Welder Knaf | Individual C3 | Zhao (CHN); L 0–3 | Judge (IRL); L 0–3 | —N/a | 9 | did not advance | | | |
| David Andrade de Freitas | Individual C3 | Öhgren (SWE); W 3–0 | Glinbancheun (THA); L 0–3 | —N/a | 3 | Merrien (FRA); L 0–3 | did not advance | | |
| Israel Stroh | Individual C7 | Inoue (JPN); W 3–2 | Youssef (EGY); W 3–1 | Ballestrino (AUS); W 3–0 | | Liao (CHN); L 1–3 | did not advance | | |
| Paulo Salmin | Individual C7 | Yan (CHN); L 0–3 | Jozic (CRO); W 3–2 | —N/a | 2 | Schnake (GER); L 0–3 | did not advance | | |
| Luiz Filipe Guarnieri | Individual C8 | Ye CQ (CHN); L 0–3 | Karlsson (SWE); L 1–3 | —N/a | 9 | did not advance | | | |
| Carlos Carbinatti | Individual C10 | Boheas (FRA); L 0–3 | Cogill (RSA); L 0–3 | Kardos (AUT); L 1–3 | 9 | did not advance | | | |
| Luiz Filipe Guarnieri; Paulo Salmin; Israel Pereira Stroh | Team C6–7 | —N/a | | | Japan (JPN); W 2–0 | China (CHN); L 0–2 | did not advance | | 9 |
| Luiz Filipe Guarnieri; Paulo Salmin; Israel Pereira Stroh | Team C9–10 | —N/a | | | Australia (AUS); L 0–2 | did not advance | | | 9 |

Women

| Athlete | Event | Preliminaries | | | | Quarterfinals | Semifinals | Final / BM | |
| Athlete | Event | Opposition Result | Opposition Result | Opposition Result | Rank | Opposition Result | Opposition Result | Opposition Result | Rank |
|---|---|---|---|---|---|---|---|---|---|
| Cátia Oliveira | Individual C2 | Tapola (FIN); W 3–2 | Buclaw (POL); L 0–3 | —N/a | 2 | Rossi (ITA); W 3–2 | Seo Sy (KOR); L1–3 | Did not advance | 3rd place, bronze medalist(s) |
| Marliane Santos | Individual C3 | Yoon (KOR); L 0–3 | Kanova (SVK) L 0–3 | —N/a | 9 | did not advance | | | |
| Joyce de Oliveira | Individual C4 | Gu X (CHN); L 0–3 | Elelimat (JOR); W 3–0 | —N/a | 3 | Pateh BH (IND)L 0–3 | did not advance | | |
| Millena França dos Santos | Individual C7 | Wang (CHN); L 0–3 | Kim S (KOR); L 0–3 | —N/a | 9 | did not advance | | | |
| Lethícia Lacerda | Individual C8 | Dahlen (NOR); L 0–3 | Huang (CHN); L 1–3 | —N/a | 9 | did not advance | | | |
| Danielle Rauen | Individual C9 | Szvitacs (HUN); L 1–3 | Kavas (TUR); W 3–0 | Xiong (CHN); L 0–3 | 3 | did not advance | | | |
| Jennyfer Parinos | Individual C9 | Lei LN (AUS); L 0–3 | Kim KH (KOR); L 1–3 | Pek K (POL); L 1–3 | 4 | did not advance | | | |
| Bruna Alexandre | Individual C10 | Tapper (AUS); W 3–0 | Lin Ty (TPE); W 3–0 | —N/a | 1 | —N/a | Tien SW (TPE); W 3–1 | Q Wang (AUS); L 1–3 | 2nd place, silver medalist(s) |
| Luiz Felipe Guarnieri Manara; Paulo Salmin; Israel Pereira Stroh | Team C1–3 | —N/a | | | South Korea (KOR); L 1–2 | did not advance | | | 9 |
| Luiz Felipe Guarnieri Manara; Paulo Salmin; Israel Pereira Stroh | Team C6–8 | —N/a | | | RPC (RPC); L 0–2 | did not advance | | | 9 |
| Luiz Felipe Guarnieri Manara; Paulo Salmin; Israel Pereira Stroh | Team C9–10 | —N/a | | | | Turkey (TUR); W 2–1 | Poland (POL); L 0–2 | Did not advance | 3rd place, bronze medalist(s) |

== Taekwondo ==
Brazil qualified three athletes to compete at the Paralympics competition. Two of them confirmed to compete at the games by winning the gold medal at the 2021 Americas Qualification Tournament in San Jose, Costa Rica, while the other athlete qualified by placing second at the world ranking.

| Athlete | Event | First round | Quarterfinals | Semifinals | Final / BM | |
| Athlete | Event | Opposition Result | Opposition Result | Opposition Result | Opposition Result | Rank |
|---|---|---|---|---|---|---|
| Nathan Torquato | Men's −61 kg | Hakizimana (RPT); W 27–4 | Tanaka (JPN); W 58–24 | Bossolo (ITA); W 37–34 | Elzayat (EGY); W RSC | Gold medal |
| Silvana Fernandes | Women's −58 kg | —N/a | Salinaro (USA); W 15–2 | Gjessing (DEN); L 6–8 | Did not avance | 3rd place, bronze medalist(s) |
| Débora Menezes | Women's +58 kg | —N/a | Martinez Mariscal (MEX); W 24–12 | Lypetska (UKR); W 55–10 | Naimova (UZB); L 4–8 | 2nd place, silver medalist(s) |

== Volleyball ==
The women's sitting volleyball team qualified for the 2020 Summer Paralympics after being finalist at the 2019 Parapan American Games, since the United States were already qualified after being World Champions.

Summary

| Team | Event | Group stage | | | | Semifinal | Final / BM / Cl. | |
| Team | Event | Opposition Score | Opposition Score | Opposition Score | Rank | Opposition Score | Opposition Score | Rank |
|---|---|---|---|---|---|---|---|---|
| Brazil men's | Men's tournament | China; W 3–1 | Iran; L 0–3 | Germany; L 1–3 | 2 Q | RPC; L 1–3 | Bosnia and Herzegovina; L 1–3 | 4 |
| Brazil women's | Women's tournament | Canada; W 3–2 | Japan; W 3–0 | Italy; W 3–1 | 1 Q | United States; L 0–3 | Canada; W 3–1 | 3rd place, bronze medalist(s) |

=== Men's tournament ===
Group play

| Pos | Team | Pld | W | L | Pts | SW | SL | SR | SPW | SPL | SPR | Qualification |
|---|---|---|---|---|---|---|---|---|---|---|---|---|
| 1 | Iran | 3 | 3 | 0 | 3 | 9 | 0 | MAX | 225 | 177 | 1.271 | Semifinals |
| 2 | Brazil | 3 | 1 | 2 | 1 | 4 | 7 | 0.571 | 253 | 258 | 0.981 | Semifinals |
| 3 | Germany | 3 | 1 | 2 | 1 | 4 | 7 | 0.571 | 247 | 258 | 0.957 | Fifth place match |
| 4 | China | 3 | 1 | 2 | 1 | 4 | 7 | 0.571 | 241 | 273 | 0.883 | Seventh place match |

Source: TOCOG

| 28 August 2021; 18:30 v | Brazil | 3–1 | China | Makuhari Messe, Tokyo; Referees: Sari Mannersuo (FIN), Ritsuto Yamamichi (JPN) |
| 28 August 2021; 18:30 v | (28–26, 26–28, 25–19, 25–13); Results Statistics | | | Makuhari Messe, Tokyo; Referees: Sari Mannersuo (FIN), Ritsuto Yamamichi (JPN) |

| 30 August 2021; 20:30 v | Iran | 3–0 | Brazil | Makuhari Messe, Tokyo; Referees: Ritsuto Yamamichi (JPN), Krisztina Árpás (HUN) |
| 30 August 2021; 20:30 v | (25–19, 25–23, 25–22); Results Statistics | | | Makuhari Messe, Tokyo; Referees: Ritsuto Yamamichi (JPN), Krisztina Árpás (HUN) |

| 31 August 2021; 14:00 v | Brazil | 1–3 | Germany | Makuhari Messe, Tokyo; Referees: Ebrahim Firouzi (IRI), Haris Helac (BIH) |
| 31 August 2021; 14:00 v | (23–25, 25–22, 19–25, 18–25); Results Statistics | | | Makuhari Messe, Tokyo; Referees: Ebrahim Firouzi (IRI), Haris Helac (BIH) |

Semifinal

| 2 September 2021; 18:30 v | RPC (RPC) | 3–1 | Brazil | Makuhari Messe, Tokyo; Referees: Haris Helać (BIH), Christina Fiebich (USA) |
| 2 September 2021; 18:30 v | (22–25, 25–21, 25–19, 25–19); Results Statistics | | | Makuhari Messe, Tokyo; Referees: Haris Helać (BIH), Christina Fiebich (USA) |

Bronze medal match

| 4 September 2021; 14:00 v | Brazil | 1–3 | Bosnia and Herzegovina (bronze) | Makuhari Messe, Tokyo; Referees: Neal Konowalyk (CAN), Sari Mannersuo (FIN) |
| 4 September 2021; 14:00 v | (25–23, 19–25, 18–25, 11–25); Results Statistics | | | Makuhari Messe, Tokyo; Referees: Neal Konowalyk (CAN), Sari Mannersuo (FIN) |

=== Women's tournament ===
Group play

| Pos | Team | Pld | W | L | Pts | SW | SL | SR | SPW | SPL | SPR | Qualification |
|---|---|---|---|---|---|---|---|---|---|---|---|---|
| 1 | Brazil | 3 | 3 | 0 | 3 | 9 | 3 | 3.000 | 289 | 237 | 1.219 | Semifinals |
| 2 | Canada | 3 | 2 | 1 | 2 | 8 | 4 | 2.000 | 278 | 243 | 1.144 | Semifinals |
| 3 | Italy | 3 | 1 | 2 | 1 | 5 | 6 | 0.833 | 227 | 232 | 0.978 | Fifth place match |
| 4 | Japan (H) | 3 | 0 | 3 | 0 | 0 | 9 | 0.000 | 143 | 225 | 0.636 | Seventh place match |

Source: TOCOG
(H) Host

| 27 August 2021; 18:30 v | Brazil | 3–2 | Canada | Makuhari Messe, Tokyo; Referees: Krisztina Árpás (HUN), Kim Jong-heun (KOR) |
| 27 August 2021; 18:30 v | (21–25, 26–24, 25–20, 27–29, 17–15); Results Statistics | | | Makuhari Messe, Tokyo; Referees: Krisztina Árpás (HUN), Kim Jong-heun (KOR) |

| 29 August 2021; 20:30 v | Japan | 0–3 | Brazil | Makuhari Messe, Tokyo; Referees: Christina Fiebich (GER), Haris Helac (BIH) |
| 29 August 2021; 20:30 v | (13–25, 16–25, 16–25); Results Statistics | | | Makuhari Messe, Tokyo; Referees: Christina Fiebich (GER), Haris Helac (BIH) |

| 1 September 2021; 10:00 v | Brazil | 3–1 | Italy | Makuhari Messe, Tokyo; Referees: Benno Meijer (NED), Krisztina Árpás (HUN) |
| 1 September 2021; 10:00 v | (23–25, 25–17, 25–16, 25–21); Results Statistics | | | Makuhari Messe, Tokyo; Referees: Benno Meijer (NED), Krisztina Árpás (HUN) |

Semifinal

| 3 September 2021; 18:30 v | Brazil | 0–3 | United States | Makuhari Messe, Tokyo; Referees: Krisztina Árpás (HUN), Huang Xiao (CHN) |
| 3 September 2021; 18:30 v | (19–25, 11–25, 23–25); Results Statistics | | | Makuhari Messe, Tokyo; Referees: Krisztina Árpás (HUN), Huang Xiao (CHN) |

Bronze medal match

| 4 September 2021; 16:30 v | (bronze) Brazil | 3–1 | Canada | Makuhari Messe, Tokyo; Referees: Khalid Shanishah (LBA), Ute Fischer (GER) |
| 4 September 2021; 16:30 v | (25–15, 24–26, 26–24, 25–14); Results Statistics | | | Makuhari Messe, Tokyo; Referees: Khalid Shanishah (LBA), Ute Fischer (GER) |

== Wheelchair fencing ==
Men

| Athlete | Event | Qualification | | | Round of 16 | Quarterfinal | Semifinal | Final / BM | |
| Athlete | Event | Opposition | Score | Rank | Opposition Score | Opposition Score | Opposition Score | Opposition Score | Rank |
|---|---|---|---|---|---|---|---|---|---|
| Vanderson Chaves | Individual sabre B | Tarhanyi (HUN) | L 1–5 | 12 | did not advance | | | | |
| Vanderson Chaves | Individual sabre B | Kurzin (ROC) | L 0–5 | 12 | did not advance | | | | |
| Vanderson Chaves | Individual sabre B | Valet (FRA) | L 1–5 | 12 | did not advance | | | | |
| Vanderson Chaves | Individual sabre B | Pluta (POL) | L 2–5 | 12 | did not advance | | | | |
| Vanderson Chaves | Individual sabre B | Mainville (CAN) | L 0–5 | 12 | did not advance | | | | |
| Vanderson Chaves | Individual foil B | Onda (JPN) | W 5–3 | 10 Q | Naumenko (UKR); L 11–15 | did not advance | | | |
| Vanderson Chaves | Individual foil B | Valet (FRA) | L 2–5 | 10 Q | Naumenko (UKR); L 11–15 | did not advance | | | |
| Vanderson Chaves | Individual foil B | Coutya (GBR) | L 1–5 | 10 Q | Naumenko (UKR); L 11–15 | did not advance | | | |
| Vanderson Chaves | Individual foil B | Kuzyukov (RPC) | L 3–5 | 10 Q | Naumenko (UKR); L 11–15 | did not advance | | | |
| Vanderson Chaves | Individual foil B | Naumenko (UKR) | L 3–5 | 10 Q | Naumenko (UKR); L 11–15 | did not advance | | | |
| Vanderson Chaves | Individual foil B | Feng (CHN) | L 4–5 | 10 Q | Naumenko (UKR); L 11–15 | did not advance | | | |
| Jovane Guissone | Individual épée B | Hu D (CHN) | W 5–3 | 2 Q | Bye | Ali (EGY); W 15–10 | Coutya (GBR); W 15–12 | Kuzyukov (ROC); L 8–15 | 2nd place, silver medalist(s) |
| Jovane Guissone | Individual épée B | Naumenko (UKR) | L 2–5 | 2 Q | Bye | Ali (EGY); W 15–10 | Coutya (GBR); W 15–12 | Kuzyukov (ROC); L 8–15 | 2nd place, silver medalist(s) |
| Jovane Guissone | Individual épée B | Gaworski (BLR) | W 5–0 | 2 Q | Bye | Ali (EGY); W 15–10 | Coutya (GBR); W 15–12 | Kuzyukov (ROC); L 8–15 | 2nd place, silver medalist(s) |
| Jovane Guissone | Individual épée B | Kurzin (ROC) | W 5–1 | 2 Q | Bye | Ali (EGY); W 15–10 | Coutya (GBR); W 15–12 | Kuzyukov (ROC); L 8–15 | 2nd place, silver medalist(s) |
| Jovane Guissone | Individual épée B | Tarjanyi (HUN) | W 5–2 | 2 Q | Bye | Ali (EGY); W 15–10 | Coutya (GBR); W 15–12 | Kuzyukov (ROC); L 8–15 | 2nd place, silver medalist(s) |
| Jovane Guissone | Individual foil B | Datsko (UKR) | L 1–5 | 13 | did not advance | | | | |
| Jovane Guissone | Individual foil B | Kamalov (RPC) | L 1–5 | 13 | did not advance | | | | |
| Jovane Guissone | Individual foil B | Castro (POL) | W 5–4 | 13 | did not advance | | | | |
| Jovane Guissone | Individual foil B | Cima (ITA) | L 3–5 | 13 | did not advance | | | | |
| Jovane Guissone | Individual foil B | Fujita (JPN) | L 3–5 | 13 | did not advance | | | | |
| Jovane Guissone | Individual foil B | Hu (CHN) | L 2–5 | 13 | did not advance | | | | |

Women

| Athlete | Event | Qualification | | | Round of 16 | Quarterfinal | Semifinal | Final / BM | |
| Athlete | Event | Opposition | Score | Rank | Opposition Score | Opposition Score | Opposition Score | Opposition Score | Rank |
|---|---|---|---|---|---|---|---|---|---|
| Mônica Santos | Individual sabre B | Abe (JPN) | L 1–5 | 11 | did not advance | | | | |
| Mônica Santos | Individual sabre B | Mezo (HUN) | L 1–5 | 11 | did not advance | | | | |
| Mônica Santos | Individual sabre B | Fedota (UKR) | L 1–5 | 11 | did not advance | | | | |
| Mônica Santos | Individual sabre B | Mishurova (ROC) | L 3–5 | 11 | did not advance | | | | |
| Mônica Santos | Individual sabre B | Tan (CHN) | L 0–5 | 11 | did not advance | | | | |
| Mônica Santos | Individual foil B | Khetsuriani (GEO) | W 5–3 | 9 Q | Khetsuriani (GEO); L 7–15 | did not advance | | | |
| Mônica Santos | Individual foil B | Chung (HKG) | L 4–5 | 9 Q | Khetsuriani (GEO); L 7–15 | did not advance | | | |
| Mônica Santos | Individual foil B | Xiao (CHN) | L 1–5 | 9 Q | Khetsuriani (GEO); L 7–15 | did not advance | | | |
| Mônica Santos | Individual foil B | Vio (ITA) | L 1–5 | 9 Q | Khetsuriani (GEO); L 7–15 | did not advance | | | |
| Mônica Santos | Individual foil B | Vasileva (RPC) | L 2–5 | 9 Q | Khetsuriani (GEO); L 7–15 | did not advance | | | |
| Mônica Santos | Individual foil B | Abe (JPN) | W 5–0 | 9 Q | Khetsuriani (GEO); L 7–15 | did not advance | | | |
| Carminha Oliveira | Individual épée A | Krajnyak (HUN) | L 2–5 | 15 | did not advance | | | | |
| Carminha Oliveira | Individual épée A | Yu (HKG) | L 2–5 | 15 | did not advance | | | | |
| Carminha Oliveira | Individual épée A | Mandryk (UKR) | L 3–5 | 15 | did not advance | | | | |
| Carminha Oliveira | Individual épée A | Maya (RPC) | L 0–5 | 15 | did not advance | | | | |
| Carminha Oliveira | Individual foil A | Trigilia (ITA) | L 2–5 | 16 | did not advance | | | | |
| Carminha Oliveira | Individual foil A | Morkvych (UKR) | L 0–5 | 16 | did not advance | | | | |
| Carminha Oliveira | Individual foil A | Morel (CAN) | L 3–5 | 16 | did not advance | | | | |
| Carminha Oliveira | Individual foil A | Rong (CHN) | L 1–5 | 16 | did not advance | | | | |
| Carminha Oliveira | Individual foil A | Sycheva (RPC) | L 1–5 | 16 | did not advance | | | | |

== Wheelchair tennis ==
Brazil qualified seven players entries for wheelchair tennis. Five of them qualified by the world rankings, while the other qualified by received the bipartite commission invitation allocation quotas.

| Athlete | Event | Round of 64 | Round of 32 | Round of 16 | Quarterfinals | Semifinals | Final / BM | |
| Athlete | Event | Opposition Result | Opposition Result | Opposition Result | Opposition Result | Opposition Result | Opposition Result | Rank |
|---|---|---|---|---|---|---|---|---|
| Gustavo Carneiro | Men's singles | Els (RSA); L 6–1, 4–6, 3–6 | did not advance | | | | | |
| Rafael Medeiros | Men's singles | Boukartacha (MAR); L 5–7, 1–6 | did not advance | | | | | |
| Maurício Pommê | Men's singles | Oh S-h (KOR); L 0–6, 3–6 | did not advance | | | | | |
| Daniel Rodrigues | Men's singles | Olsson (SWE); L 3–6, 2–6 | did not advance | | | | | |
| Gustavo Carneiro; Daniel Rodrigues | Men's doubles | —N/a | Dunn / Weekes (AUS); W 6–2, 6–3 | Gérard / Vandorpe (BEL); L 3–6, 2–6 | did not advance | | | |
| Maurício Pommê; Rafael Medeiros | Men's doubles | —N/a | Berdichevsky / Sasson (ISR); L 1–6, 0–2^{ret} | did not advance | | | | |
| Ana Caldeira | Women's singles | —N/a | Lvova (RPC); L 0–6, 2–6 | did not advance | | | | |
| Meirycoll Duval | Women's singles | —N/a | Baron (USA); W 6–4, 6–4 | Kamiji (JPN); L 0–6, 0–6 | did not advance | | | |
| Ana Caldeira; Meirycoll Duval | Women's doubles | —N/a | | Huang H / Huang J (CHN); L 0–6, 0–6 | did not advance | | | |
| Ymanitu Silva | Quad singles | —N/a | | Wagner (USA); L 6–3, 2–6, 2–6 | did not advance | | | |

== See also ==
- Brazil at the Paralympics
- Brazil at the 2020 Summer Olympics
