= Athletics at the 2020 Summer Paralympics – Women's 400 metres T11 =

Women's 400 metres T11 at the XVI Paralympic Games
- Venue: Tokyo National Stadium
- Dates: 27 August 2021 (heats); 28 August 2021 (final)
- Competitors: 13 from 10 nations
- Winning time: 56.25

Medalists
1st place, gold medalist(s)		Liu Cuiqing	China
2nd place, silver medalist(s)		Thalita Simplício	Brazil
3rd place, bronze medalist(s)		Angie Pabón	Colombia

The women's 400 metres T11 event at the 2020 Summer Paralympics in Tokyo took place between 27 and 28 August 2021.

The T11 category is for athletes with a visual impairment. A T11 athlete may be entirely without sight, or be able to perceive light, but have no ability to see the shape of a hand at any distance. T11 athletes commonly run with guides.

== Records ==
Prior to the competition, the existing records were as follows:

World Record	Liu Cuiqing (CHN)	56.00	Beijing, China	13 May 2018
Paralympic Record	Liu Cuiqing (CHN)	56.31	Rio de Janeiro, Brazil	15 September 2016

Area	Time	Athlete	Nation
Africa	58.97	Lahja Ishitile	Namibia
America	56.14	Terezinha Guilhermina	Brazil
Asia	56.00 WR	Liu Cuiqing	China
Europe	56.83	Purificacion Santamarta	Spain
Oceania	1:03.77	Record Mark	

== Results ==
=== Heats ===
Heat 1 took place on 27 August 2021, at 11:01:

Rank	Lane	Name	Nationality	Time	Notes
1	3	Linda Patricia Perez Lopez	Venezuela	59.60	Q, PB
2	7	Jhulia Dos Santos	Brazil	1:00.12	q
3	1	Juliana Ngleya Moko	Angola	1:04.26	PB
4	5	Melissa Baldera	Peru	1:04.44	PB

Heat 2 took place on 27 August 2021, at 11:09:

Rank	Lane	Name	Nationality	Time	Notes
1	3	Liu Cuiqing	China	59.30	Q, SB
2	7	Lahja Ishitile	Namibia	59.94	q, SB
	5	Suneeporn Tanomwong	Thailand	DNS	

Heat 3 took place on 27 August 2021, at 11:17:

Rank	Lane	Name	Nationality	Time	Notes
1	3	Angie Pabón	Colombia	1:04.44	Q
	7	Silvânia Costa de Oliveira	Brazil	DNF	
	5	Sol Rojas	Venezuela	DNS	

Heat 4 took place on 27 August 2021, at 11:25:

Rank	Lane	Name	Nationality	Time	Notes
1	3	Thalita Simplício	Brazil	59.77	Q, SB
2	7	Diana Coraza	Mexico	1:01.01	q, SB
3	5	Joanna Mazur	Poland	1:01.50	q, SB

=== Semi-finals ===
Semi-final 1 took place on 27 August 2021, at 19:40:

Rank	Lane	Name	Nationality	Time	Notes
1	3	Thalita Simplício	Brazil	57.90	Q, SB
2	5	Linda Patricia Perez Lopez	Venezuela	58.99	q, PB
3	7	Lahja Ishitile	Namibia	1:00.42	
4	1	Diana Coraza	Mexico	1:01.34	

Semi-final 2 took place on 27 August 2021, at 19:48:

Rank	Lane	Name	Nationality	Time	Notes
1	3	Liu Cuiqing	China	58.17	Q, SB
2	5	Angie Pabón	Colombia	58.18	q, PB
3	7	Jhulia Dos Santos	Brazil	59.17	SB
4	1	Joanna Mazur	Poland	1:01.82	

=== Final ===
The final took place on 28 August 2021, at 11:45:

Rank	Lane	Name	Nationality	Time	Notes
1st place, gold medalist(s)	3	Liu Cuiqing	China	56.25	PR
2nd place, silver medalist(s)	5	Thalita Simplício	Brazil	56.80	PB
3rd place, bronze medalist(s)	7	Angie Pabón	Colombia	57.46	PB
4	1	Linda Patricia Perez Lopez	Venezuela	57.71	PB
