= Athletics at the 2020 Summer Paralympics – Women's 200 metres T11 =

Women's 200 metres T11 at the XVI Paralympic Games
- Venue: Tokyo National Stadium
- Dates: 2 September 2021 (heats); 4 September 2021 (final)
- Competitors: 15 from 12 nations
- Winning time: 24.94

Medalists
| 1st place, gold medalist(s) | | Liu Cuiqing | China |
| 2nd place, silver medalist(s) | | Thalita Simplício | Brazil |
| 3rd place, bronze medalist(s) | | Jerusa Geber Dos Santos | Brazil |

The women's 200 metres T11 event at the 2020 Summer Paralympics in Tokyo took place between 2 and 4 September 2021.

The T11 category is for athletes with a visual impairment. A T11 athlete may be entirely without sight, or be able to perceive light, but have no ability to see the shape of a hand at any distance. T11 athletes commonly run with guides.

== Records ==
Prior to the competition, the existing records were as follows:

| World Record | Liu Cuiqing (CHN) | 24.39 | Tianjin, China | 30 August 2019 |
| Paralympic Record | Libby Clegg (GBR) | 24.51 | Rio de Janeiro, Brazil | 13 September 2016 |

| Area | Time | Athlete | Nation |
|---|---|---|---|
| Africa | 25.37 | Lahja Ishitile | Namibia |
| America | 24.67 | Terezinha Guilhermina | Brazil |
| Asia | 24.39 WR | Liu Cuiqing | China |
| Europe | 24.44 | Libby Clegg | Great Britain |
| Oceania | 32.93 | Ruci Senikula | Fiji |

== Results ==
=== Heats ===
Heat 1 took place on 2 September 2021, at 10:02:

| Rank | Lane | Name | Nationality | Time | Notes |
|---|---|---|---|---|---|
| 1 | 1 | Jerusa Geber Dos Santos | Brazil | 25.86 | Q, SB |
| 2 | 5 | Sol Rojas | Venezuela | 26.05 | q, SB |
| 3 | 7 | Joanna Mazur | Poland | 28.40 | SB |
| | 3 | Aurélie Faravavy | Madagascar | DNS | |

Heat 2 took place on 2 September 2021, at 10:10:

| Rank | Lane | Name | Nationality | Time | Notes |
|---|---|---|---|---|---|
| 1 | 1 | Linda Patricia Pérez López | Venezuela | 25.87 | Q, PB |
| 2 | 3 | Lorena Salvatini Spoladore | Brazil | 26.20 | q, SB |
| 3 | 7 | Juliana Ngleya Moko | Angola | 27.27 | q, PB |
| 4 | 5 | Melissa Baldera | Peru | 29.16 | |

Heat 3 took place on 2 September 2021, at 10:18:

| Rank | Lane | Name | Nationality | Time | Notes |
|---|---|---|---|---|---|
| 1 | 7 | Liu Cuiqing | China | 26.09 | Q, SB |
| 2 | 3 | Suneeporn Tanomwong | Thailand | 27.33 | SB |
| 3 | 5 | Lahja Ishitile | Namibia | 27.42 | SB |

Heat 4 took place on 2 September 2021, at 10:26:

| Rank | Lane | Name | Nationality | Time | Notes |
|---|---|---|---|---|---|
| 1 | 5 | Thalita Simplício | Brazil | 25.45 | Q |
| 2 | 7 | Judith Mariette Lebog | Cameroon | 26.95 | q, PB |
| 3 | 3 | Libby Clegg | Great Britain | 27.93 | |
| 4 | 1 | Keula Nidreia Pereira Semedo | Cape Verde | 33.04 | SB |

=== Semi-finals ===
Semi-final 1 took place on 3 September 2021, at 9:39:

| Rank | Lane | Name | Nationality | Time | Notes |
|---|---|---|---|---|---|
| 1 | 3 | Jerusa Geber Dos Santos | Brazil | 25.35 | Q, SB |
| 2 | 5 | Linda Patricia Pérez López | Venezuela | 25.41 | q, PB |
| 3 | 7 | Lorena Salvatini Spoladore | Brazil | 25.95 | SB |
| 4 | 1 | Judith Mariette Lebog | Cameroon | 26.90 | PB |

Semi-final 2 took place on 3 September 2021, at 9:47:

| Rank | Lane | Name | Nationality | Time | Notes |
|---|---|---|---|---|---|
| 1 | 5 | Thalita Simplício | Brazil | 24.98 | Q |
| 2 | 3 | Liu Cuiqing | China | 25.22 | q, SB |
| 3 | 7 | Sol Rojas | Venezuela | 25.81 | SB |
| 4 | 1 | Juliana Ngleya Moko | Angola | 27.12 | PB |

=== Final ===
The final took place on 4 September, at 19:29:

| Rank | Lane | Name | Nationality | Time | Notes |
|---|---|---|---|---|---|
| 1st place, gold medalist(s) | 5 | Liu Cuiqing | China | 24.94 | SB |
| 2nd place, silver medalist(s) | 3 | Thalita Simplício | Brazil | 24.94 | =SB |
| 3rd place, bronze medalist(s) | 7 | Jerusa Geber Dos Santos | Brazil | 25.19 | SB |
| 4 | 1 | Linda Patricia Pérez López | Venezuela | 25.27 | PB |
