= Edileusa dos Santos =

Brazilian para-athlete (born 1966)

Personal information
- Born: 20 January 1966 (age 60) Paranaguá, Paraná, Brazil

Sport
- Country: Brazil
- Sport: Para-athletics
- Disability class: T72
Medal record
Paralympic athletics
Representing Brazil
World Championships
Bronze medal – third place	2025 New Delhi	400 m T72

Edileusa Almeida dos Santos (born 20 January 1966) is a Brazilian para-athlete who competes in sprinting events at international track and field competitions in the T72 classification.

== Biography ==
Edileusa Almeida dos Santos was born in Paranaguá, Paraná, Brazil on 20 January 1966. In 2015, dos Santos was diagnosed with Parkinson's disease. She was introduced by her coach to frame running, who encouraged her to join the Petrinha project, which uses frame running as a way to rehabilitate.

== Athletic career ==
In April 2025, Dos Santos set a new Americas record in the 400 m in frame running, posting a time of 1:18.31. She competed at the 2025 World Para Athletics Championships, where she won the bronze medal in the 400 metres with a time of 1:22:68 following the disqualification of Judith Tortosa Vila.
