= Magdalena Andruszkiewicz =

Polish para-athlete (born 1989)

Personal information
- Born: 14 June 1989 (age 37)

Sport
- Country: Poland
- Sport: Para-athletics
- Disability class: T72
- Event(s): 100 metres, 400 metres
Medal record
Paralympic athletics
Representing Poland
World Championships
Gold medal – first place	2024 Kobe	100 m T72
Gold medal – first place	2025 New Delhi	100 m T72
Gold medal – first place	2025 New Delhi	400 m T72
Silver medal – second place	2023 Paris	100 m T72

Magdalena Andruszkiewicz (born 14 June 1989) is a Polish para-athlete who competes in sprinting events at international track and field competitions in the T72 classification.

== Personal life ==
Andruszkiewicz worked as a dancer until 2018 when she suffered a stroke that left a side of her body paralysed. While rehabilitating, she began to pedal on a frame cycle, which became her passion.

== Athletic career ==
In July 2023, Andruszkiewicz won the silver medal in the Women’s 100 m T72 frame running at the 2023 World Para Athletics Championships, which was her first medal at the championships. At the 2024 World Para Athletics Championships, she competed in the 100 metres, where she won her first gold medal. She competed at the 2025 World Para Athletics Championships, where she won the gold medal in the 400 metres and 100 metres.
