= 2025 World Para Athletics Championships – Women's 400 metres =

The women's 400 metres events at the 2025 World Para Athletics Championships were held at the Jawaharlal Nehru Stadium, Delhi in New Delhi.

== Medalists ==
| Event | Gold | Silver | Bronze |
|---|---|---|---|
| T11 | Thalita Simplício; Brazil | Juliana Ngleya Moko; Angola | Melissa Baldera; Peru |
| T12 | Anna Kulinich-Sorokina; Neutral Paralympic Athletes | Hajar Safarzadeh; Iran | Alejandra Paola Pérez López; Venezuela |
| T13 | Carolina Duarte; Portugal | Mariia Ulianenko; Neutral Paralympic Athletes | Mana Sasaki; Japan |
| T20 | Aysel Önder; Turkey | Deepthi Jeevanji; India | Yuliia Shuliar; Ukraine |
| T34 | Hannah Cockroft; Great Britain | Karé Adenegan; Great Britain | Fabienne André; Great Britain |
| T37 | Nataliia Kobzar; Ukraine | Viktoriia Slanova; Neutral Paralympic Athletes | Sheryl James; South Africa |
| T38 | Karen Palomeque; Colombia | Chen Zimo; China | Lindy Ave; Germany |
| T47 | Maria Clara Augusto; Brazil | Anastasiia Soloveva; Neutral Paralympic Athletes | Jule Ross; Germany |
| T53 | Catherine Debrunner; Switzerland | Hamide Doğangün; Turkey | Zhou Hongzhuan; China |
| T54 | Léa Bayekula; Belgium | Zhou Zhaoqian; China | Hannah Dederick; United States |
| T72 | Magdalena Andruszkiewicz; Poland | Andrea Stokholm Overgaard; Denmark | Edileusa dos Santos; Brazil |

== T11 ==
Final

The event took place on 29 September.

| Rank | Lane | Name | Nationality | Time | Notes |
|---|---|---|---|---|---|
| 1st place, gold medalist(s) | 3 | Thalita Simplício | Brazil | 59.76 | |
| 2nd place, silver medalist(s) | 5 | Juliana Ngleya Moko | Angola | 1:01.42 | PB |
| 3rd place, bronze medalist(s) | 7 | Melissa Baldera | Peru | 1:03.84 | SB |
| 4 | 1 | Priscah Jepkemei | Kenya | 1:04.79 | PB |

Round 1

The event took place on 28 September. Qualification: First 1 in each heat (Q) and the next 2 fastest (q) advance to the Final

| Rank | Heat | Lane | Name | Nationality | Time | Notes |
|---|---|---|---|---|---|---|
| 1 | 1 | 3 | Thalita Simplício | Brazil | 1:01.76 | Q |
| 2 | 2 | 3 | Juliana Ngleya Moko | Angola | 1:03.20 | Q, SB |
| 3 | 1 | 7 | Melissa Baldera | Peru | 1:04.51 | q, SB |
| 4 | 1 | 5 | Priscah Jepkemei | Kenya | 1:05.32 | q, SB |
| 5 | 2 | 7 | Nancy Chelangat Koech | Kenya | 1:05.47 | SB |
| | 2 | 5 | Minette Ilona Ngouegue | Cameroon | DNS | |

== T12 ==
Final

The event took place on 1 October.

| Rank | Lane | Name | Nationality | Time | Notes |
|---|---|---|---|---|---|
| 1st place, gold medalist(s) | 5 | Anna Kulinich-Sorokina | Neutral Paralympic Athletes | 56.38 | PB |
| 2nd place, silver medalist(s) | 3 | Hajar Safarzadeh | Iran | 56.39 | SB |
| 3rd place, bronze medalist(s) | 7 | Alejandra Paola Pérez López | Venezuela | 56.66 | SB |
| 4 | 1 | Shen Yaqin | China | 56.67 | PB |

Round 1

The event took place on 30 September. Qualification: First 1 in each heat (Q) and the next 1 fastest (q) advance to the Final

| Rank | Heat | Lane | Name | Nationality | Time | Notes |
|---|---|---|---|---|---|---|
| 1 | 3 | 3 | Anna Kulinich-Sorokina | Neutral Paralympic Athletes | 57.26 | Q, SB |
| 2 | 3 | 5 | Shen Yaqin | China | 57.36 | q, PB |
| 3 | 2 | 5 | Hajar Safarzadeh | Iran | 57.46 | Q, SB |
| 4 | 2 | 7 | Sevda Kılınç Çırakoğlu | Turkey | 58.60 | PB |
| 5 | 1 | 7 | Alejandra Paola Pérez López | Venezuela | 58.93 | Q, SB |
| 6 | 1 | 5 | Lahja Ipinge | Namibia | 59.78 | PB |
| 7 | 1 | 3 | Manuela Jacinto | Dominican Republic | 1:02.02 | PB |
| 8 | 2 | 3 | Izaskun Osés Ayúcar | Spain | 1:02.33 | SB |
| 9 | 3 | 7 | Evelina-Cristina Cretu | Moldova | 1:11.38 | SB |

== T13 ==
Final

The event took place on 5 October.

| Rank | Lane | Name | Nationality | Time | Notes |
|---|---|---|---|---|---|
| 1st place, gold medalist(s) | 8 | Carolina Duarte | Portugal | 57.08 | |
| 2nd place, silver medalist(s) | 5 | Mariia Ulianenko | Neutral Paralympic Athletes | 58.31 | SB |
| 3rd place, bronze medalist(s) | 7 | Mana Sasaki | Japan | 59.39 | |
| 4 | 9 | Gloria Majaga | Botswana | 1:01.30 | |
| 5 | 4 | Melissa Calvo | Costa Rica | 1:01.79 | PB |
| | 6 | Rayane Soares da Silva | Brazil | DNS | |

== T20 ==
Final

The event took place on 27 September.

| Rank | Lane | Name | Nationality | Time | Notes |
|---|---|---|---|---|---|
| 1st place, gold medalist(s) | 8 | Aysel Önder | Turkey | 54.51 | WR |
| 2nd place, silver medalist(s) | 6 | Deepthi Jeevanji | India | 55.16 | SB |
| 3rd place, bronze medalist(s) | 4 | Yuliia Shuliar | Ukraine | 56.29(.282) | SB |
| 4 | 7 | Leonela Coromoto Vera Colina | Venezuela | 56.29(.289) | PB |
| 5 | 2 | Mayerli Minda | Ecuador | 58.67 | PB |
| 6 | 3 | Carina Paim | Portugal | 59.41 | SB |
| 7 | 5 | Diana Vivenes | Dominican Republic | 1:00.48 | |
| 8 | 9 | Telaya Blacksmith | Australia | 1:03.57 | |

Round 1

The event took place on 27 September. Qualification: First 3 in each heat (Q) and the next 2 fastest (q) advance to the Final

| Rank | Heat | Lane | Name | Nationality | Time | Notes |
|---|---|---|---|---|---|---|
| 1 | 1 | 6 | Leonela Coromoto Vera Colina | Venezuela | 57.10 | Q, SB |
| 2 | 1 | 7 | Aysel Önder | Turkey | 57.88 | Q |
| 3 | 1 | 9 | Yuliia Shuliar | Ukraine | 58.01 | Q, SB |
| 4 | 2 | 8 | Deepthi Jeevanji | India | 58.35 | Q, SB |
| 5 | 1 | 4 | Mayerli Minda | Ecuador | 58.98 | q, PB |
| 6 | 2 | 4 | Diana Vivenes | Dominican Republic | 59.41 | Q, SB |
| 7 | 1 | 8 | Carina Paim | Portugal | 59.61 | Q, SB |
| 8 | 1 | 5 | Im Yeong-ji | South Korea | 1:00.06 | PB |
| 9 | 2 | 6 | Telaya Blacksmith | Australia | 1:00.10 | Q |
| 10 | 2 | 9 | Reyhan Taşdelen | Turkey | 1:00.31 | |
| 11 | 2 | 5 | Martina Absolonová | Czech Republic | 1:03.77 | |
| 12 | 2 | 7 | Florianne Lantoine | France | 1:04.29 | |

== T34 ==
Final

The event took place on 28 September.

| Rank | Lane | Name | Nationality | Time | Notes |
|---|---|---|---|---|---|
| 1st place, gold medalist(s) | 7 | Hannah Cockroft | Great Britain | 55.62 | CR |
| 2nd place, silver medalist(s) | 8 | Kare Adenegan | Great Britain | 1:02.70 | SB |
| 3rd place, bronze medalist(s) | 6 | Fabienne André | Great Britain | 1:04.31 | |
| 4 | 5 | Coco Espie | Australia | 1:13.82 | |

== T37 ==
Final

The event took place on 28 September.

| Rank | Lane | Name | Nationality | Time | Notes |
|---|---|---|---|---|---|
| 1st place, gold medalist(s) | 6 | Nataliia Kobzar | Ukraine | 1:01.18 | SB |
| 2nd place, silver medalist(s) | 8 | Viktoriia Slanova | Neutral Paralympic Athletes | 1:05.08 | SB |
| 3rd place, bronze medalist(s) | 5 | Sheryl James | South Africa | 1:06.21 | |
| 4 | 7 | Akeesha Snowden | Australia | 1:06.68 | |
| 5 | 9 | Liezel Gouws | South Africa | 1:07.13 | SB |
| 6 | 4 | Laure Ustaritz | France | 1:08.79 | SB |
| 7 | 2 | Johanna Benson | Namibia | 1:11.28 | SB |
| 8 | 3 | Selma Van Kerm | Belgium | 1:16.23 | |

== T38 ==
Final

The event took place on 5 October.

| Rank | Lane | Name | Nationality | Time | Notes |
|---|---|---|---|---|---|
| 1st place, gold medalist(s) | 5 | Karen Palomeque | Colombia | 59.45 | SB |
| 2nd place, silver medalist(s) | 9 | Chen Zimo | China | 1:00.14 | AS |
| 3rd place, bronze medalist(s) | 7 | Lindy Ave | Germany | 1:00.20 | SB |
| 4 | 8 | Margarita Goncharova | Neutral Paralympic Athletes | 1:00.46 | SB |
| 5 | 6 | Rhiannon Clarke | Australia | 1:02.32 | SB |
| 6 | 3 | Sofia Pace | France | 1:02.87 | |
| 7 | 2 | Briseis Brittain | Australia | 1:04.93 | |
| 8 | 4 | Layla Sharp | Australia | 1:05.17 | SB |

Round 1

The event took place on 4 October. Qualification: First 3 in each heat (Q) and the next 2 fastest (q) advance to the Final.

| Rank | Heat | Lane | Name | Nationality | Time | Notes |
|---|---|---|---|---|---|---|
| 1 | 1 | 5 | Karen Palomeque | Colombia | 59.56 | Q, SB |
| 2 | 1 | 8 | Lindy Ave | Germany | 1:00.96 | Q, SB |
| 3 | 1 | 7 | Chen Zimo | China | 1:01.04 | Q, AS |
| 4 | 2 | 6 | Margarita Goncharova | Neutral Paralympic Athletes | 1:01.35 | Q, SB |
| 5 | 1 | 6 | Sofia Pace | France | 1:02.27 | q |
| 6 | 1 | 4 | Briseis Brittain | Australia | 1:04.18 | q, PB |
| 7 | 2 | 7 | Rhiannon Clarke | Australia | 1:05.13 | Q |
| 8 | 2 | 5 | Layla Sharp | Australia | 1:05.62 | Q, SB |
| 9 | 2 | 8 | Ilgın Meryem Metin | Turkey | 1:12.35 | |
| 10 | 2 | 4 | Ericka Violeta Esteban Villatoro | Guatemala | 1:12.84 | SB |

== T47 ==
Final

The event took place on 2 October.

| Rank | Lane | Name | Nationality | Time | Notes |
|---|---|---|---|---|---|
| 1st place, gold medalist(s) | 8 | Maria Clara Augusto | Brazil | 56.17 | PB |
| 2nd place, silver medalist(s) | 6 | Anastasiia Soloveva | Neutral Paralympic Athletes | 57.63 | SB |
| 3rd place, bronze medalist(s) | 7 | Jule Ross | Germany | 57.78 | PB |
| 4 | 9 | Amanda Rummery | Canada | 58.31 | SB |
| 5 | 5 | Fernanda Yara da Silva | Brazil | 58.32 | |
| 6 | 3 | Amanda Cerna | Chile | 58.63 | PB |
| 7 | 4 | Petra Luterán | Hungary | 59.44 | |
| 8 | 2 | Kerragan Johnson | United States | 59.77 | |

Round 1

The event took place on 1 October. Qualification: First 3 in each heat (Q) and the next 2 fastest (q) advance to the Final.

| Rank | Heat | Lane | Name | Nationality | Time | Notes |
|---|---|---|---|---|---|---|
| 1 | 2 | 8 | Maria Clara Augusto | Brazil | 58.17 | Q |
| 2 | 2 | 5 | Jule Ross | Germany | 58.50 | Q, PB |
| 3 | 2 | 7 | Petra Luterán | Hungary | 59.02 | Q, SB |
| 4 | 1 | 8 | Anastasiia Soloveva | Neutral Paralympic Athletes | 59.11 | Q |
| 5 | 1 | 7 | Fernanda Yara da Silva | Brazil | 59.13 | Q |
| 6 | 2 | 6 | Amanda Cerna | Chile | 59.13 | q, PB |
| 7 | 1 | 3 | Amanda Rummery | Canada | 59.33 | Q |
| 8 | 2 | 9 | Kerragan Johnson | United States | 59.42 | q, PB |
| 9 | 1 | 4 | Anjanaben Rohitbhai Bumbadiya | India | 1:00.04 | PB |
| 10 | 1 | 5 | Maria Lara | Chile | 1:02.13 | |
| 11 | 1 | 9 | Agata Galan | Poland | 1:03.81 | |
| 12 | 2 | 4 | Prisca Aciro | Uganda | 1:05.83 | |
| 13 | 1 | 6 | Tabita Vulturar | Romania | 1:07.73 | SB |

== T53 ==
Final

The event took place on 3 October.

| Rank | Lane | Name | Nationality | Time | Notes |
|---|---|---|---|---|---|
| 1st place, gold medalist(s) | 8 | Catherine Debrunner | Switzerland | 50.58 | CR |
| 2nd place, silver medalist(s) | 6 | Hamide Doğangün | Turkey | 53.72 | PB |
| 3rd place, bronze medalist(s) | 7 | Zhou Hongzhuan | China | 54.31 | SB |
| 4 | 5 | Gao Fang | China | 56.43 | SB |
| 5 | 9 | Jessica Cooper Lewis | Bermuda | 59.91 | |
| 6 | 4 | Sarah James | New Zealand | 1:07.46 | |
| 7 | 3 | Gohar Navasardyan | Armenia | 2:14.36 | PB |

== T54 ==
Final

The event took place on 3 October.

| Rank | Lane | Name | Nationality | Time | Notes |
|---|---|---|---|---|---|
| 1st place, gold medalist(s) | 8 | Léa Bayekula | Belgium | 50.99 | |
| 2nd place, silver medalist(s) | 5 | Zhou Zhaoqian | China | 53.22 | PB |
| 3rd place, bronze medalist(s) | 7 | Hannah Dederick | United States | 53.29 | PB |
| 4 | 6 | Melanie Woods | Great Britain | 53.51 | |
| 5 | 4 | Noemi Alphonse | Mauritius | 54.06 | |
| 6 | 9 | Marie Desirella Brandy Perrine | Mauritius | 55.61 | |
| 7 | 2 | Lucia Montenegro | Argentina | 57.12 | PB |
| 8 | 3 | Zübeyde Süpürgeci | Turkey | 58.89 | |

Round 1

The event took place on 3 October. Qualification: First 3 in each heat (Q) and the next 2 fastest (q) advance to the Final.

| Rank | Heat | Lane | Name | Nationality | Time | Notes |
|---|---|---|---|---|---|---|
| 1 | 2 | 7 | Léa Bayekula | Belgium | 50.50 | Q, CR |
| 2 | 2 | 5 | Zhou Zhaoqian | China | 53.26 | Q, PB |
| 3 | 1 | 7 | Hannah Dederick | United States | 53.69 | Q |
| 4 | 1 | 8 | Melanie Woods | Great Britain | 53.78 | Q |
| 5 | 1 | 5 | Noemi Alphonse | Mauritius | 53.86 | Q |
| 6 | 2 | 6 | Marie Desirella Brandy Perrine | Mauritius | 55.05 | Q, PB |
| 7 | 1 | 6 | Zübeyde Süpürgeci | Turkey | 57.31 | q, PB |
| 8 | 1 | 4 | Lucia Montenegro | Argentina | 57.69 | q |
| 9 | 2 | 8 | Nandini Sharma | Canada | 57.94 | |
| 10 | 2 | 4 | Anisa Abdulle | Norway | 59.90 | PB |

== T72 ==
Final

The event took place on 28 September.

| Rank | Lane | Name | Nationality | Time | Notes |
|---|---|---|---|---|---|
| 1st place, gold medalist(s) | 7 | Magdalena Andruszkiewicz | Poland | 1:13.98 | |
| 2nd place, silver medalist(s) | 6 | Andrea Stokholm Overgaard | Denmark | 1:15.36 | PB |
| 3rd place, bronze medalist(s) | 8 | Edileusa dos Santos | Brazil | 1:22.68 | |
| 4 | 9 | Sayers Grooms | United States | 1:25.33 | SB |
| 5 | 2 | Karla Risum | Denmark | 1:32.15 | |
| 6 | 4 | Zofia Kalucka | Poland | DNF | |
| | 5 | Judith Tortosa Vila | Spain | DQ | |
