= Andrea Stokholm Overgaard =

Danish para-athlete (born 1997)

Personal information
- Born: 26 October 1997 (age 28)

Sport
- Country: Denmark
- Sport: Para-athletics
- Disability class: T72
Medal record
Paralympic athletics
Representing Denmark
World Championships
Silver medal – second place	2025 New Delhi	400 m T72
Bronze medal – third place	2019 Dubai	100 m RR3

Andrea Stokholm Overgaard (born 26 October 1997) is a Danish para-athlete who competes in sprinting events at international track and field competitions in the T72 classification.

== Athletic career ==
In 2019, Overgaard competed in the inaugural women's 100m RR3 event at the World Para Athletics Championships in Dubai and won the bronze medal, finishing behind Kayleigh Haggo and Ellie Simpson. She competed at the 2025 World Para Athletics Championships, where she won the silver medal in the 400 metres.
