= Keula Nidreia Pereira Semedo =

Cape Verdean Paralympic athlete

Keula Semedo
Personal information
- Full name: Keula Nidreia Pereira Semedo
- Nationality: Cape Verdean
- Born: 25 July 1989 (age 36) Praia, Cape Verde

Sport
- Sport: Paralympic athletics
- Disability: Visually impaired
- Disability class: T11
- Event(s): 100m, 200m

Keula Nidreia Pereira Semedo (born 25 July 1989), also known as Keula Semedo, is a Cape Verdean Paralympic athlete. She made her first Paralympic appearance representing Cape Verde at the 2020 Summer Paralympics.

== Biography ==
She had relocated from Cape Verde to Portugal in 2010s following her mother's footsteps who also moved to Europe in order to be closer with her spouse.

== Career ==
She competed in both women's T11 100m T11 and women's 200m T11 events during the 2020 Summer Paralympics. She finished at fourth position in both women's 100m T11 category and women's 200m T11 category heat events and narrowly missed out on qualifying to the next round in both events.

During the women's 200m T11 category which was held on 2 September 2021, her guide Manuel Antonio Vaz da Lega dropped to the knee in front of Pereira Semedo and conveyed his marriage proposal to her.
