= Liu Cuiqing =

Chinese Paralympic athlete (born 1991)

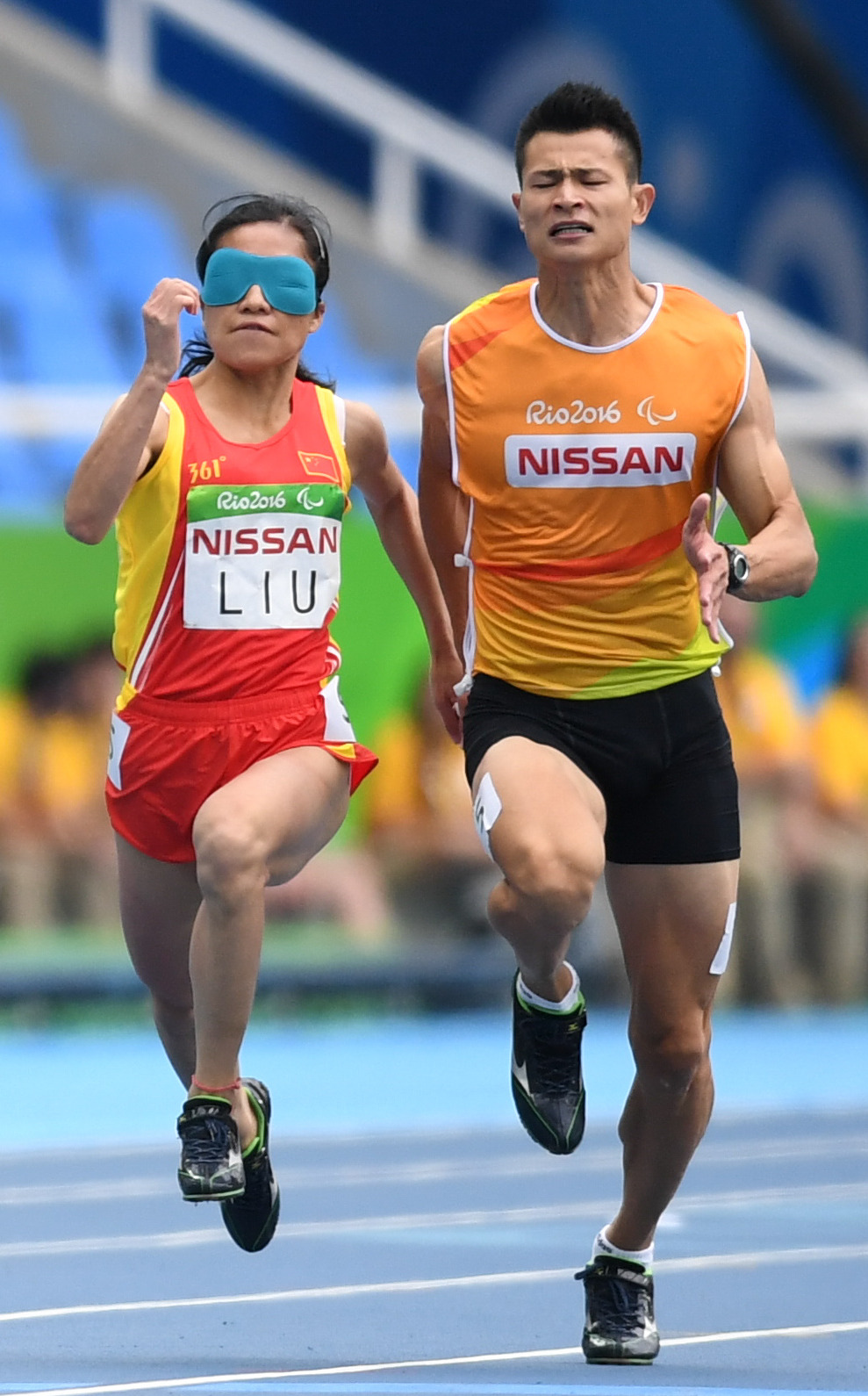
- Liu and Xu run 100 m at the 2016 Paralympics

Personal information
- Full name: Liu Cuiqing 刘翠青
- Nationality: China
- Born: October 28, 1991 (age 34)

Sport
- Country: P.R.China
- Sport: Athletics
- Disability class: T11
- Event(s): Sprint, long jump
Medal record
Women's para athletics
Representing China
Paralympic Games
Gold medal – first place	2016 Rio de Janeiro	4 × 100 m T11-13
Gold medal – first place	2016 Rio de Janeiro	400 m T11
Gold medal – first place	2020 Tokyo	200 m T11
Gold medal – first place	2020 Tokyo	400 m T11
Silver medal – second place	2016 Rio de Janeiro	200 m T11
Silver medal – second place	2020 Tokyo	100 m T11
Silver medal – second place	2024 Paris	100 m T11
Silver medal – second place	2024 Paris	200 m T11
Bronze medal – third place	2016 Rio de Janeiro	100 m T11
World Championships
Gold medal – first place	2015 Doha	100 m T11
Gold medal – first place	2015 Doha	200 m T11
Gold medal – first place	2015 Doha	400 m T11
Gold medal – first place	2015 Doha	4x100m relay
Gold medal – first place	2017 London	400 m T11
Gold medal – first place	2019 Dubai	200 m T11
Gold medal – first place	2024 Kobe	200 m T11
Silver medal – second place	2017 London	200 m T11
Silver medal – second place	2019 Dubai	100 m T11
Silver medal – second place	2019 Dubai	400 m T11
Silver medal – second place	2023 Paris	200 m T11
Silver medal – second place	2024 Kobe	100 m T11
Silver medal – second place	2024 Kobe	400 m T11
Asian Para Games
Gold medal – first place	2018 Jakarta	100 m T11
Gold medal – first place	2018 Jakarta	200 m T11
Gold medal – first place	2018 Jakarta	400 m T11
Gold medal – first place	2022 Hangzhou	100 m T11
Gold medal – first place	2022 Hangzhou	200 m T11

Liu Cuiqing 刘翠青 (born October 28, 1991) is a Chinese para-athlete. She specializes in track and field.

== Career ==
She competed at the 2016 Summer Paralympics in the T11/F11 100 metres, 200 metres, 400 metres and long jump. She won a bronze medal in the 100 metres with a time of 11.99 seconds. She runs with guide Xu Donglin 徐冬林.

In May 2019, she beat Zhou Guohua both in the 100m action replay and in the women’s 200 metres in the T11 visually-impaired category at the World Para Athletics Grand Prix in Beijing.

She won her first gold medal in the Women's 400m-11T Final at the Tokyo Paralympic Games with a record of 56.25s.

During the Beijing Paralympic Winter Games, she and her guide were the fifth torchbearers at the Opening Ceremony.

== Award and nomination ==
In 2016, Liu was nominated for the Sportsperson of the year with a disability in the Laureus World Sports Awards.
