= Judith Tortosa Vila =

Spanish para-athlete (born 2005)

Personal information
- Born: 26 September 2005 (age 20) San Javier, Murcia, Spain

Sport
- Country: Spain
- Sport: Para-athletics
- Disability class: T72
Medal record
Paralympic athletics
Representing Spain
World Championships
Silver medal – second place	2024 Kobe	100 m T72
Silver medal – second place	2025 New Delhi	100 m T72
Bronze medal – third place	2023 Paris	100 m T72

Judith Tortosa Vila (born 26 September 2005) is a Spanish para-athlete who competes in sprinting events at international track and field competitions in the T72 classification.

== Athletic career ==
In July 2023, Tortosa won the bronze medal in the Women’s 100 m T72 frame running at the 2023 World Para Athletics Championships. At the 2024 World Para Athletics Championships, she competed in the 100 metres, where she won the silver medal.

Tortosa competed at the 2025 World Para Athletics Championships held in New Delhi, India. In the 400 metres, she originally finished in third place but was later disqualified for running outside her assigned lane. However, she won the silver medal in the 100 m T72.
