= Angie Pabón =

Colombian Paralympic athlete

Personal information
- Nickname: Angie Lizeth Pabón Mamian
- Nationality: Colombian
- Born: 16 July 1997 (age 28)

Sport
- Sport: Paralympic athletics
- Disability class: T11
- Event: 400 metres
- Club: Valle del Cauca
- Coached by: Alonso Mina
Medal record
Paralympic athletics
Representing Colombia
Paralympic Games
Bronze medal – third place	2020 Tokyo	400 m T11
World Championships
Bronze medal – third place	2023 Paris	400 m T11
Parapan American Games
Gold medal – first place	2023 Santiago	4 × 100 m relay
Silver medal – second place	2023 Santiago	100 m T11

Angie Lizeth Pabón Mamian (born 16 July 1997) is a Colombian visually impaired Paralympic athlete specializing in sprints. She represented Colombia at the 2020 Summer Paralympics.

== Career ==
She lost her vision as the result of a car accident in 2013. She represented Colombia in the women's 400 metres T11 event at the 2020 Summer Paralympics and won a bronze medal.
