= Amanda Rummery =

Canadian para-athletics sprinter

Personal information
- Born: August 7, 1997 (age 28)
- Home town: Sherwood Park, Alberta, Canada

Sport
- Sport: Para-athletics
- Disability class: T47, T46

Amanda Rummery (born August 7, 1997) is a Canadian para-athletics sprinter who competes in 100-metre, 200-metre, and 400-metre events.

== Early life and education ==
Rummery graduated from Archbishop Jordan Catholic High School. Shortly after, she was in ATV accident in 2015 in Kenora when nerves in her left arm were severed from her spinal cord, leaving her paralyzed from her shoulder down. After three years undergoing multiple unsuccessful surgeries to repair the nerves, her arm was amputated below the elbow in 2018.

Rummery graduated from MacEwan University. She attends the University of Alberta in the Faculty of Education student and competes for the University of Alberta Pandas.

== Career ==
In 2017, Rummery took up track, joining Edmonton's Steadward Bears. In May 2019, she won three silver medals at the 2019 Desert Challenge Games in Phoenix, Arizona. She made her major games debut at the 2019 Parapan American Games, competing in the women's 100-metre, 200-metre, and 400-metre T47. She placed fifth in both the 100-metre and 200-metre events. She competed at the 2019 World Para Athletics Championships and narrowly missed qualifying for the 2020 Summer Paralympics.

At the 2022 Warmup to Worlds meet, Rummery won the women's T46 400-metre, setting a new personal best time, despite being an alternate on the start list and only learning she would compete shortly before the race began. She placed fourth in the 400-metre, missing a podium finish by about half a second, and sixth in the 200-metre at the 2023 World Para Athletics Championships.

After winning the para-ambulatory 400-metre final at the Bell Trials in Montreal, Rummery qualified to compete at the 2024 Summer Paralympics in Paris. As of July 2024, she holds the Canadian T46 record in the 100-metre, 200-metre, and 400-metre and is ranked second in the world. She placed fifth in the women’s T47 400m final at the Paralympics.
