= Daniel Tavares =

American serial killer (born 1966)

- Born: Daniel Thomas Tavares Jr. 1966 (age 59–60); Fall River, Massachusetts, U.S.
- Convictions: Massachusetts: Manslaughter; First degree murder; Washington: Aggravated first degree murder (2 counts)
- Penalty: Massachusetts; 17 to 20 years (Manslaughter); Both states Life sentence without the possibility of parole

Details
- Victims: 4
- Span of crimes: 1988–2007
- Country: United States
- States: Massachusetts, Washington
- Date apprehended: November 2007
- Imprisoned at: Monroe Correctional Complex, Monroe, Washington

Daniel Thomas Tavares Jr. (born 1966) is an American serial killer who was convicted of stabbing his mother to death in 1991 and committing a double murder upon his release from prison in 2007. He also confessed to and was convicted for the 1988 murder of a woman found buried in a backyard.

== Early life ==
Tavares was born in 1966, the youngest of four children, to Ann and Daniel Tavares Sr., who was an officer in the US Navy. His parents divorced when he was four years old, and his father moved to Florida and remarried, leaving Daniel and his siblings to be raised by their single mother.

Tavares dropped out of school in the eighth grade and was first arrested at age 19 for an assault committed during an overnight burglary. A friend of the Tavares family wrote to the judge that Tavares was a "very sincere and honest young man" and said, "I do not believe that you will see this person in your court again once this ordeal is over." Subsequently, Tavares was sentenced to one year of probation, and months later, he was charged with trespassing and possession of marijuana and received another five months of probation. Months later, he was charged with robbery and given a prison sentence for violating his probation conditions. He would be charged several more times throughout the mid- to late 1980s for drug possession, disorderly conduct, and larceny.

In 1988, Tavares moved to Florida with his father, whom he had not seen since his early childhood. His father tried to get him counseling for his drug addiction and got him a job as an apprentice welder. His attempts at rehabilitating his son failed when Tavares was caught with a stolen checkbook. He later returned to his mother's home in Fall River, Massachusetts. Tavares's mental health quickly deteriorated, and he was using several pharmaceutical drugs, including fluphenazine, a drug used to treat schizophrenia.

== Murders and imprisonment ==
On July 10, 1991, Tavares stabbed his mother 26 times in their home with a carving knife. During the incident, he also stabbed Richard Pires, who wrote a letter recommending leniency for his assault charge in 1985. When police arrived, Tavares was banging his head on the ceiling, proclaiming, "I can't take it. I'm hearing voices, and I can't take it." He would later give a variety of explanations for why he killed his mother, including that he was given an LSD-laced drink at a bar hours earlier and that his mother's two boyfriends would regularly force him to engage in sexual acts with her, which caused him to snap. In June 1992, Tavares pleaded guilty to manslaughter and was sentenced to 17 to 20 years in prison. During his imprisonment, he would file numerous lawsuits and claim that he was harassed and assaulted by correctional officers for being gay.

In June 2007, Tavares was released from prison and relocated to Graham, Washington. On November 17, 2007, he fatally shot his neighbors Beverly and Brian Mauck in their home. He was arrested and claimed to have murdered them because they owed him $50 for a tattoo and had disrespected him. In February 2008, Tavares received a life sentence for the murders.

In 2015, Tavares was found guilty of the October 27, 1988, murder of Gayle Botelho, who was found buried beneath a tree in the backyard of his previous address. Prosecutors stated that she was murdered over a cocaine debt. He confessed to the murder on at least four occasions, first to law enforcement while imprisoned in 2000. On another occasion, he claimed not to be the person who shot her, stating that she was killed by "rival drug dealers".

As of 2020, he is serving a life sentence at Monroe Correctional Complex in Monroe, Washington.

== See also ==
- List of serial killers in the United States
