= Oleg Naumenko =

Ukrainian wheelchair fencer

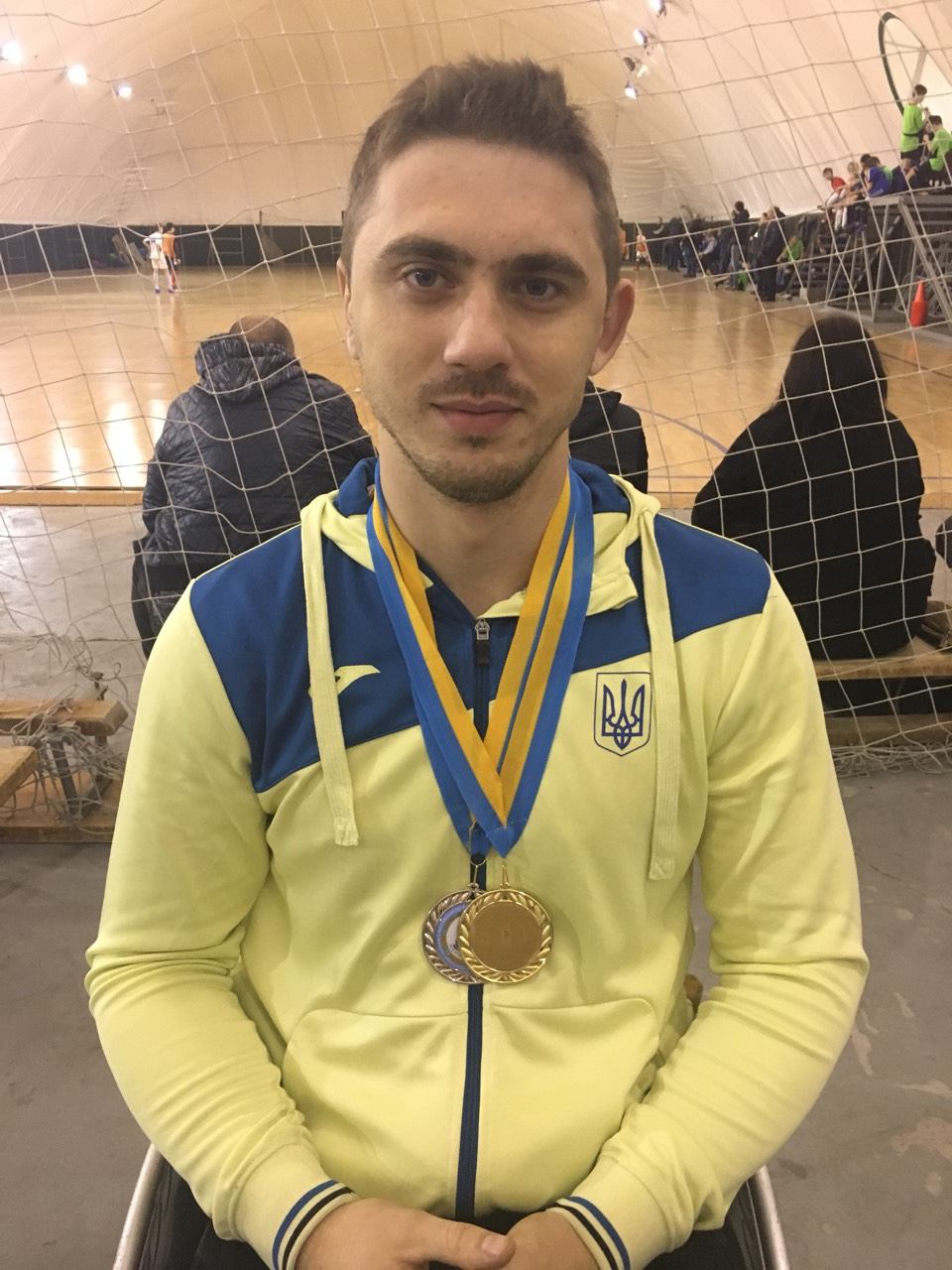
- Oleg Naumenko (2017)

Sport
- Country: Ukraine
- Sport: Wheelchair fencing
Medal record
Paralympic Games
Bronze medal – third place	2016 Rio de Janeiro	Épée B

Oleg Naumenko is a Ukrainian wheelchair fencer. He represented Ukraine at the 2016 Summer Paralympics and he won the bronze medal in the men's épée B event.
