= Juliana Ngleya Moko =

Angolan Paralympic athlete (born 2000)

Personal information
- Born: 20 June 2000 (age 26) Benguela, Angola

Sport
- Sport: Paralympic athletics
- Disability class: T11
- Event(s): 100 metres 200 metres 400 metres
Medal record
Representing Angola
World Championships
Silver medal – second place	2025 New Delhi	400 m T11

Juliana Ngleya Moko (born 20 June 2000) is an Angolan Paralympic athlete who competes in sprinting events at international track and field competitions. She competed in the 2020 and 2024 Summer Paralympics. She is also a medalist at the World Para Athletics Championships.

== Career ==
Moko competed three events in the 2019 World Para Athletics Championships held in Dubai, United Arab Emirates.

Moko competed for Angola at the 2020 Summer Paralympics as the only female athlete in the delegation. She competed in three events, including the 100 metres T11, where she reached the semifinals and finished in sixth place there, which was her highest finish. Moko competed for her country at the 2024 Summer Paralympics, again as the only female athlete in the delegation. Once again, she competed in three events, including the 400 metres T11, where she reached the heat 2 of the semifinals and finished in third place there, which was her highest finish.

Moko competed in the 2025 World Para Athletics Championships, where she won the silver medal in the 400 m T11.
