= T71-72 (classification) =

Para-athletics classification

T71-72 are disability sport classifications for para-athletics, specifically for frame running athletes. It includes athletes who have coordination impairments such as hypertonia, ataxia and athetosis. Events for these classes include 100 metres and 400 metres.

== History ==
Frame running was unsuccessfully proposed for inclusion at the 2024 Summer Paralympics. The T71 event made its debut at the 2025 World Para Athletics Championships. The men's and women's 100 metres T72 events will make its Paralympic debut at the 2028 Summer Paralympics.
