= Linda Patricia Pérez López =

Venezuelan Paralympic athlete

Linda Pérez
Personal information
- Full name: Linda Patricia Pérez López
- Born: 9 July 1998 (age 27) Maracaibo, Zulia, Venezuela

Sport
- Country: Venezuela
- Sport: Paralympic athletics
- Disability class: T11
- Event(s): 100 metres 200 metres 400 metres
Medal record
Paralympic athletics
Representing Venezuela
Paralympic Games
Gold medal – first place	2020 Tokyo	100m T11
Parapan American Games
Silver medal – second place	2019 Lima	400m T11

Linda Patricia Pérez López (born 9 July 1998) is a Venezuelan Paralympic athlete who competes in sprinting events at international elite events. She is a Parapan American Games silver medalist and Summer Paralympics gold medalist.

== Career ==
Perez competed at the 2019 Parapan American Games where she won the silver medal at the 400m T11 event. She competed at the 2020 Summer Paralympics, winning the gold medal at the women's 100m event.

She is the twin sister of Alejandra Paola Pérez López who is also an athlete.
