= Thalita Simplício =

Brazilian Paralympic athlete

Personal information
- Full name: Thalita Vitória Simplício da Silva
- Born: 20 August 1997 (age 28) Natal, Brazil
- Height: 1.61 m (5 ft 3 in)
- Weight: 49 kg (108 lb)

Sport
- Country: Brazil
- Sport: Para athletics
- Disability: Glaucoma
- Disability class: T11
- Event(s): 100 metres 200 metres 400 metres Long jump
Medal record
Women's para athletics
Representing Brazil
Paralympic Games
Silver medal – second place	2016 Rio de Janeiro	Mixed 4x100m relay T11-13
Silver medal – second place	2020 Tokyo	200 m T11
Silver medal – second place	2020 Tokyo	400 m T11
Silver medal – second place	2024 Paris	400 m T11
World Championships
Gold medal – first place	2019 Dubai	400 m T11
Gold medal – first place	2023 Paris	400 m T11
Gold medal – first place	2024 Kobe	400 m T11
Gold medal – first place	2025 New Delhi	400 m T11
Silver medal – second place	2019 Dubai	200 m T11
Silver medal – second place	2024 Kobe	200 m T11
Bronze medal – third place	2015 Doha	400 m T11
Bronze medal – third place	2023 Paris	200 m T11
Bronze medal – third place	2025 New Delhi	200 m T11
Parapan American Games
Silver medal – second place	2015 Toronto	200 m T11
Silver medal – second place	2015 Toronto	400 m T11
Silver medal – second place	2015 Toronto	Long jump T11/12
Silver medal – second place	2019 Lima	100 m T11
Silver medal – second place	2019 Lima	200 m T11
Silver medal – second place	2023 Santiago	200 m T11

Thalita Vitória Simplício da Silva (born 20 August 1997) is a Brazilian Paralympic athlete who competes in sprinting and long jump events at international elite events. She is a Paralympic silver medalist, a six-time Parapan American Games silver medalist and a World champion in sprinting.

== Career ==
She was one of the first dozen Brazilian paralympians cleared to compete at the Tokyo Olympics postponed to 2021. Other early choices to be included were Jerusa Geber dos Santos (who also competes in T11), Rayane Soares (T13), Beth Gomes (F52), Claudiney Batista (F56), Cícero Nobre (F57) and Thiago Paulino.

== Personal life ==
Simplício was born with impaired vision and went completely blind aged twelve.
