= Melissa Baldera =

Peruvian Paralympic athlete (born 1995)

Personal information
- Born: 20 September 1995 (age 30) Lima, Peru

Sport
- Sport: Paralympic athletics
- Disability: Glaucoma
- Disability class: T11
- Event(s): 100 metres 200 metres 400 metres
Medal record
Representing Peru
World Championships
Bronze medal – third place	2025 New Delhi	400 m T11

Melissa Baldera (born 20 September 1995) is a Peruvian Paralympic athlete who competes in sprinting events at international track and field competitions.

== Early life ==
Born in Lima, Baldera lost 90% of her vision at the age of 19 due to glaucoma.

== Career ==
Baldera began para athletics in 2017, and in 2019, she participated in the 2019 Parapan American Games, finishing in 6th place in both the 100 and 200 meters T11. In 2021, she participated in the delayed 2020 Summer Paralympics.

Baldera competed in the 2025 World Para Athletics Championships, where she won the bronze medal in the 400 m T11.

Baldera's sight guide athlete is Edert Alonzo Yllescas Ramos.
