= Athletics at the 2024 Summer Paralympics – Women's 100 metres T47 =

Women's 100 metres T47 at the XVII Paralympic Games
- Venue: Stade de France
- Dates: 3 September 2024
- Competitors: 17 from 15 nations
- Winning time: 12.04

Medalists
1st place, gold medalist(s)		Kiara Rodriguez	Ecuador
2nd place, silver medalist(s)		Brittni Mason	United States
3rd place, bronze medalist(s)		Anna Grimaldi	New Zealand

100 metres at the 2024 Summer Paralympics
Men · T11 · T12 · T13 · T34 · T35 · T36 · T37 · T38 · T44 · T47 · T51 · T52 · T53 · T54 · T63 · T64
Women · T11 · T12 · T13 · T34 · T35 · T36 · T37 · T38 · T47 · T53 · T54 · T63 · T64

The women's 100 metres T47 event at the 2024 Summer Paralympics in Paris, took place on 3 September 2024.

== Classification ==
The event is open to T45, T46 and T47 athletes. These athletes have varying levels of upper limb/s affected by limb deficiency, impaired muscle power or impaired passive range of movement.

== Records ==
T46/47 Records

World Record	Brittni Mason (USA)	11.89	Dubai, United Arab Emirates	12 November 2019
Paralympic Record	Yunidis Castillo (CUB)	11.95	London, United Kingdom	4 September 2012

Area	Time		Athlete	Location	Date
Africa	12.36		(South Africa) Anrune Weyers	(United Arab Emirates) Dubai	12 November 2019
America	10.43	WR	(United States) Brittni Mason	(United Arab Emirates) Dubai	12 November 2019
Asia	12.50		(China) Li Lu	(United Arab Emirates) Dubai	12 November 2019
Europe	12.19		(Poland) Alicja Jeromin	(Japan) Tokyo	31 August 2021
Oceania	12.31		(New Zealand) Anna Grimaldi	(France) Paris	10 July 2023

== Results ==
=== Round 1 ===
The Heats were held on 3 September, starting at 12:52 (UTC+2) in the morning session. First 3 in each heat (Q) and the next 2 fastest (q) advance to the final

==== Heat 1 ====
Rank	Lane	Class	Athlete	Nation	Time	Notes
1	1	T46	Kiara Rodriguez	Ecuador	12.18	Q, SB
2	8	T47	Sheriauna Haase	Canada	12.47	Q, SB
3	3	T46	Saska Solokov	Serbia	12.54	Q, SB
4	9	T47	Maria Clara Augusto da Silva	Brazil	12.63	q, SB
5	6	T46	Jule Ross	Germany	12.72	PB
6	5	T46	Li Lu	China	12.87	SB
7	2	T47	Tereza Jakschova	Czech Republic	13.21	PB
8	4	T47	Aldana Isabel Ibanez	Argentina	13.22	PB
9	7	T47	Tinotendo Nicole Bango	Zimbabwe	13.71	PB
Source:					Wind: -0.4 m/s	

==== Heat 2 ====
Rank	Lane	Class	Athlete	Nation	Time	Notes
1	8	T47	Lisbeli Marina Vera Andrade	Venezuela	11.99	Q, SB
2	4	T46	Brittni Mason	United States	12.18	Q, SB
3	5	T47	Anna Grimaldi	New Zealand	12.23	Q, AR
4	6	T46	Marie Ngoussou Ngouyi	France	12.54	q, PB
5	9	T47	Fernando Yara da Silva	Brazil	12.64	SB
6	7	T47	Sasiriwan Inthachot	Thailand	12.69	PB
7	3	T47	Sae Tsuji	Japan	12.94	
8	2	T47	Kim Marie Vaske	Germany	13.22	
Source:					Wind: +0.3 m/s	

=== Final ===
The final took place on 3 September, starting at 20:23 (UTC+2) in the evening.

Rank	Lane	Class	Athlete	Nation	Time	Notes
1st place, gold medalist(s)	7	T46	Kiara Rodriguez	Ecuador	12.04	SB
2nd place, silver medalist(s)	5	T46	Brittni Mason	United States	12.10	SB
3rd place, bronze medalist(s)	8	T47	Anna Grimaldi	New Zealand	12.20	AR
4	6	T47	Sheriauna Haase	Canada	12.53	
5	3	T46	Saska Solokov	Serbia	12.56	
6	9	T46	Marie Ngoussou Ngouyi	France	12.58	
7	2	T47	Maria Clara Augusto da Silva	Brazil	12.63	SB
–	4	T47	Lisbeli Marina Vera Andrade	Venezuela	DNF	
Source:					Wind: 0.0 m/s	
