= Athletics at the 2020 Summer Paralympics – Women's 200 metres T47 =

Women's 200 metres T47 at the XVI Paralympic Games
- Venue: Tokyo National Stadium
- Dates: 4 September 2021 (final)
- Competitors: 17 from 16 nations
- Winning time: 24.52

Medalists
1st place, gold medalist(s)		Lisbeli Vera Andrade	Venezuela
2nd place, silver medalist(s)		Brittni Mason	United States
3rd place, bronze medalist(s)		Alicja Fiodorow	Poland

The women's 200 metres T47 event at the 2020 Summer Paralympics in Tokyo took place on 4 September 2021.

The T47 category is for athletes who have a single below elbow or wrist amputation or similar disability, with normal function in both legs.

== Records ==
Prior to the competition, the existing records were as follows:

World Record	Yunidis Castillo (CUB)	24.45	London, United Kingdom	1 September 2012
Paralympic Record	Yunidis Castillo (CUB)	24.45	London, United Kingdom	1 September 2012

Area	Time	Athlete	Nation
Africa	25.01	Anrune Weyers	South Africa
America	24.45 WR	Yunidis Castillo	Cuba
Asia	25.71	Li Lu	China
Europe	25.49	Alicja Jeromin	Poland
Oceania	25.54	Amy Winters	Australia

== Results ==
=== Heats ===
Heat 1 took place on 4 September, at 11:54:

Rank	Lane	Name	Nationality	Class	Time	Notes
1	6	Alicja Fiodorow	Poland	T47	25.06	Q, AR
2	4	Anastasiia Soloveva	RPC	T47	25.50	Q, PB
3	7	Deja Young	United States	T46	25.64	q, SB
4	3	Tereza Jakschová	Czech Republic	T47	26.81	
5	5	Pagjiraporn Gagun	Thailand	T46	27.83	

Heat 2 took place on 4 September, at 12:00:

Rank	Lane	Name	Nationality	Class	Time	Notes
1	7	Lisbeli Vera Andrade	Venezuela	T47	24.53	Q, PB
2	4	Brittni Mason	United States	T46	25.22	Q
3	3	Fernanda Yara da Silva	Brazil	T47	26.65	SB
4	8	Amanda Cerna	Chile	T47	27.13	SB
5	5	Ida-Louise Øverland	Norway	T47	27.36	
6	6	Kadiatou Bangoura	Guinea	T46	28.25	=PB

Heat 3 took place on 4 September, at 12:06:

Rank	Lane	Name	Nationality	Class	Time	Notes
1	7	Anrune Weyers	South Africa	T47	25.62	Q, SB
2	4	Saška Sokolov	Serbia	T46	26.01	Q
3	8	Li Lu	China	T46	26.06	q, SB
4	3	Sae Tsuji	Japan	T47	26.88	
5	5	Vimbai Zvinowanda	Zimbabwe	T47	28.60	PB
	6	Angelina Lanza	France	T46	DNS	

=== Final ===
The final took place on 4 September, at 19:50:

Rank	Lane	Name	Nationality	Class	Time	Notes
1st place, gold medalist(s)	7	Lisbeli Vera Andrade	Venezuela	T47	24.52	PB
2nd place, silver medalist(s)	5	Brittni Mason	United States	T46	25.00	PB
3rd place, bronze medalist(s)	4	Alicja Fiodorow	Poland	T47	25.05	AR
4	6	Anrune Weyers	South Africa	T47	25.51	SB
5	3	Deja Young	United States	T46	25.53	SB
6	8	Anastasiia Soloveva	RPC	T47	25.60	
7	9	Saška Sokolov	Serbia	T46	26.10	
8	2	Li Lu	China	T46	26.37	
