= Athletics at the 2024 Summer Paralympics – Women's 400 metres T47 =

Women's 400 metres T47 at the XVII Paralympic Games
- Venue: Stade de France
- Dates: 30 August 2024 (heats); 31 August 2024 (final)
- Competitors: 13 from 12 nations
- Winning time: 56.74

Medalists
1st place, gold medalist(s)		Fernanda Yara da Silva	Brazil
2nd place, silver medalist(s)		Lisbeli Vera Andrade	Venezuela
3rd place, bronze medalist(s)		Maria Clara Augusto	Brazil

400 metres at the 2024 Summer Paralympics
Men · T11 · T12 · T13 · T20 · T36 · T37 · T38 · T47 · T52 · T53 · T54 · T62
Women · T11 · T12 · T13 · T20 · T37 · T38 · T47 · T53 · T54 ·

The women's 400 metres T47 event at the 2024 Summer Paralympics in Paris, will take place on 30 and 31 August 2024.

The T46 category is for athletes who have a single above or below elbow amputation or similar disability, with normal function in both legs. The T47 category is for athletes who have a single below elbow or wrist amputation or similar disability, with normal function in both legs.

== Records ==
Prior to the competition, the existing records were as follows:

T46/47
World Record	Anrune Weyers (RSA)	55.60	(Belgium) Bersée	24 August 2019
Paralympic Record	Yunidis Castillo (CUB)	55.72	(United Kingdom) London	8 September 2012

Area	Time		Athlete	Location	Date
Africa	55.60	WR	(South Africa) Anrune Weyers	(Belgium) Bersée	24 August 2019
America	55.72	PR	(Cuba) Yunidis Castillo	(United Kingdom) London	8 September 2012
Asia	57.23		(China) Li Lu	(United Kingdom) London	23 July 2017
Europe	56.11		(Russia) Lioubov Vassilieva	(France) Villeneuve-d'Ascq	27 July 2002
Oceania	1:00.78		(Australia) Alissa Jordaan	(Japan) Tokyo	27 August 2021

== Results ==
=== Heats ===
2 heats start on 30 August 2024. First 3 in each heat (Q) and the next 2 fastest (q) advance to the Final.

==== Heat 1 ====
Rank	Lane	Athlete	Nation	Class	Time	Notes
1	6	Fernanda Yara da Silva	Brazil	T47	57.56	Q
2	2	Petra Luterán	Hungary	T47	58.93	Q
3	3	Anastasiia Soloveva	Neutral Paralympic Athletes	T47	59.00	Q
4	8	Sae Tsuji	Japan	T47	1:00.19	q, =SB
5	4	Li Lu	China	T46	1:01.10	
6	5	Kadiatou Bangoura	Guinea	T46	1:06.09	
7	7	Adeline Mushiranzigo	Burundi	T47	1:19.78	SB

==== Heat 2 ====
Rank	Lane	Athlete	Nation	Class	Time	Notes
1	6	Lisbeli Vera Andrade	Venezuela	T47	58.22	Q
2	7	Amanda Rummery	Canada	T46	59.24	Q
3	8	Maria Clara Augusto	Brazil	T47	59.28	Q
4	3	Jule Ross	Germany	T46	1:01.08	q
5	4	Teresita Briozzi	Argentina	T47	1:01.85	SB
6	5	Amanda Cerna	Chile	T47	1:02.19	

==== Final ====
Final starts on 30 August 2024.

Rank	Lane	Athlete	Nation	Class	Time	Notes
1st place, gold medalist(s)	6	Fernanda Yara da Silva	Brazil	T47	56.74	PB
2nd place, silver medalist(s)	8	Lisbeli Vera Andrade	Venezuela	T47	56.78	PB
3rd place, bronze medalist(s)	4	Maria Clara Augusto	Brazil	T47	57.20	PB
4	5	Petra Luterán	Hungary	T47	57.41	PB
5	7	Amanda Rummery	Canada	T46	58.02	
6	9	Anastasiia Soloveva	Neutral Paralympic Athletes	T47	58.20	SB
7	2	Sae Tsuji	Japan	T47	59.13	SB
8	3	Jule Ross	Germany	T46	59.47	
