= 2023 World Para Athletics Championships – Women's 400 metres =

The women's 400 metres at the 2023 World Para Athletics Championships were held across 9 classifications at Charlety Stadium, Paris, France, from 10 to 17 July.

== Medalists ==
Event	Gold	Silver	Bronze
T11	Thalita Simplício; Brazil	Lahja Ishitile; Namibia	Angie Pabón; Colombia
T12	Omara Durand; Cuba	Alejandra Pérez López; Venezuela	Valentina Petrillo; Italy
T13	Lamiya Valiyeva; Azerbaijan	Carolina Duarte; Portugal	Rayane Soares Da Silva; Brazil
T20	Breanna Clark; United States	Yuliia Shuliar; Ukraine	Carina Paim; Portugal
T37	Karen Palomeque; Colombia	Nataliia Kobzar; Ukraine	Jiang Fenfen; China
T38	Luca Ekler; Hungary	Rhiannon Clarke; Australia	Katty Hurtado; Colombia
T47	Fernanda Yara da Silva; Brazil	Li Lu; China	Maria Clara Augusto; Brazil
T53	Catherine Debrunner; Switzerland	Samantha Kinghorn; Great Britain	Zhou Hongzhuan; China
T54	Manuela Schär; Switzerland	Tatyana McFadden; United States	Noemi Alphonse; Mauritius

== T11 ==
The event took place on 11 July.

Rank	Lane	Name	Nationality	Time	Notes
1st place, gold medalist(s)	3	Thalita Simplício	Brazil	56.60	PB
2nd place, silver medalist(s)	7	Lahja Ishitile	Namibia	57.18	AR
3rd place, bronze medalist(s)	1	Angie Pabón	Colombia	58.22	SB
4	5	Sheryl James	South Africa	59.76	

== T12 ==
The event took place on 11 July.

Rank	Athletes	Nationality	Class	Time	Notes
1st place, gold medalist(s)	Omara Durand	Cuba	T12	52.83	SB
2nd place, silver medalist(s)	Alejandra Pérez López	Venezuela	T12	57.88	SB
3rd place, bronze medalist(s)	Valentina Petrillo	Italy	T12	58.24	
4	Fatima Ezzahra El Idrissi	Morocco	T12	59.95	PB

== T13 ==
The final of this event was held at on 17 Jul 2023.

Rank	Lane	Name	Nationality	Time	Notes "
1st place, gold medalist(s)	6	Lamiya Valiyeva	Azerbaijan	55.34	SB
2nd place, silver medalist(s)	5	Carolina Duarte	Portugal	55.68	PB
3rd place, bronze medalist(s)	3	Rayane Soares Da Silva	Brazil	57.9	SB
4	7	Nantenin Keita	France	57.94	SB
5	8	Mana Sasaki	Japan	58.02	SB
6	1	Alice Metais	France	1:00.91	PB
	2	Peace Oroma	Uganda	DNS	
	4	Erin Kerkhoff	United States	DNS	

== T20 ==
The final of this event was held on 12 Jul 2023.

Rank	Lane	Name	Nationality	Time	Notes "
1st place, gold medalist(s)	6	Breanna Clark	United States	55.12	
2nd place, silver medalist(s)	4	Yuliia Shuliar	Ukraine	56.29	
3rd place, bronze medalist(s)	3	Carina Paim	Portugal	58.51	
4	2	Jardenia Felix	Brazil	59.23	
5	7	Justyna Franieczek	Poland	1:00.10	
6	5	Mayerli Minda	Ecuador	1:00.17	
7	1	Niina Kanno	Japan	1:00.59	
	8	Lizanshela Angulo	Ecuador	DQ	

== T37 ==
The event took place on 10 July.

Rank	Lane	Name	Nationality	Time	Notes
1st place, gold medalist(s)	6	Karen Palomeque	Colombia	1:00.94	
2nd place, silver medalist(s)	5	Nataliia Kobzar	Ukraine	1:01.33	PB
3rd place, bronze medalist(s)	4	Jiang Fenfen	China	1:02.26	SB
4	3	Sheryl James	South Africa	1:03.38	AR
5	8	Liezel Gouws	South Africa	1:07.40	SB
6	7	Alina Terekh	Ukraine	1:08.31	SB
7	2	Selma Van Kerm	Belgium	1:13.93	PB

== T38 ==
The final of this event was held on 17 Jul 2023.

Rank	Lane	Name	Nationality	Time	Notes "
1st place, gold medalist(s)	6	Luca Ekler	Hungary	59.74	WR
2nd place, silver medalist(s)	4	Rhiannon Clarke	Australia	1:02.36	AR
3rd place, bronze medalist(s)	5	Katty Hurtado	Colombia	1:03.44	SB
4	3	Nele Moos	Germany	1:03.59	SB
5	8	Yuka Takamatsu	Japan	1:08.35	
6	7	Natalie Thirsk	Canada	1:08.42	PB
7	2	Katia Hardies	Belgium	1:10.79	PB
8	1	Vilma Berg	Finland	1:42.28	SB

== T47 ==
The final of this event was held on 14 Jul 2023 at Charlety Stadium, Paris, France.

Rank	Lane	Name	Nationality	Time	Notes
1st place, gold medalist(s)	6	Fernanda Yara da Silva	Brazil	57.30	SB
2nd place, silver medalist(s)	5	Lu Li	China	58.13	SB
3rd place, bronze medalist(s)	4	Maria Clara Augusto	Brazil	58.49	PB
4	8	Amanda Rummery	Canada	59.06	PB
5	3	Sae Tsuji	Japan	59.27	
6	1	Amanda Cerna	Chile	59.71	SB
7	7	Petra Luteran	Hungary	1:00.46	
	2	Sasirawan Inthachot	Thailand	DQ	

== T53 ==
The final of this event was held on 15 Jul 2023.

Rank	Lane	Name	Nationality	Time	Notes
1st place, gold medalist(s)	4	Catherine Debrunner	Switzerland	50.16	CR
2nd place, silver medalist(s)	6	Samantha Kinghorn	Great Britain	52.53	
3rd place, bronze medalist(s)	3	Zhou Hongzhuan	China	53.62	AR
4	5	Fang Gao	China	53.88	PB
5	7	Hamide Dogangun	Turkey	54.29	PB
6	8	Angela Ballard	Australia	58.05	
7	1	Jessica Lewis	Bermuda	1:00.47	
8	2	Zeynep Acet	Turkey	1:05.54	PB

== T54 ==
The final of this event was held at 19:35 on 15 Jul 2023.

Rank	Lane	Name	Nationality	Time	Notes
1st place, gold medalist(s)	5	Manuela Schaer	Switzerland	52.22	
2nd place, silver medalist(s)	4	Tatyana McFadden	United States	53.15	
3rd place, bronze medalist(s)	1	Noemi Alphonse	Mauritius	53.63	
4	2	Lea Bayekula	Belgium	53.63	
5	3	Zhou Zhaoqian	China	53.8	
6	6	Yajuan Tian	China	53.9	
7	8	Luo Shuimei	China	55.08	
	7	Hannah Dederick	United States	DQ	
