= Athletics at the 2020 Summer Paralympics – Women's 100 metres T47 =

Women's 100 metres T47 at the XVI Paralympic Games
- Venue: Tokyo National Stadium
- Dates: 31 August 2021 (final)
- Competitors: 16 from 15 nations
- Winning time: 11.97

Medalists
1st place, gold medalist(s)		Lisbeli Vera Andrade	Venezuela
2nd place, silver medalist(s)		Brittni Mason	United States
3rd place, bronze medalist(s)		Deja Young	United States

The women's 100 metres T47 event at the 2020 Summer Paralympics in Tokyo, took place on 31 August 2021.

The T47 category is for athletes who have a single below elbow or wrist amputation or similar disability, with normal function in both legs.

== Records ==
Prior to the competition, the existing records were as follows:

World Record	Petrúcio Ferreira (BRA)	10.42	Dubai, United Arab Emirates	12 November 2019
Paralympic Record	Petrúcio Ferreira (BRA)	10.57	Rio de Janeiro, Brazil	11 September 2016

Area	Time	Athlete	Nation
Africa	10.72	Ajibola Adeoye	Nigeria
America	10.42 WR	Petrúcio Ferreira	Brazil
Asia	10.79	Wang Hao	China
Europe	10.73	Michał Derus	Poland
Oceania	10.96	Gabriel Cole	Australia

== Results ==
=== Heats ===
Heat 1 took place on 31 August 2021, at 12:09:

Rank	Lane	Name	Nationality	Class	Time	Notes
1	6	Lisbeli Vera Andrade	Venezuela	T47	12.14	Q, PB
2	9	Deja Young	United States	T46	12.26	Q, SB
3	3	Li Lu	China	T46	12.58	Q, SB
4	8	Anrune Weyers	China	T47	12.66	SB
5	2	Alissa Jordaan	Australia	T47	12.80	PB
6	5	Tereza Jakschova	Czech Republic	T47	12.95	
7	4	Pagjiraporn Gagun	Thailand	T46	13.25	
8	7	Kumudu Dissanayake	Sri Lanka	T46	13.31	

Heat 2 took place on 31 August 2021, at 12:15:

Rank	Lane	Name	Nationality	Class	Time	Notes
1	9	Brittni Mason	United States	T46	12.07	Q
2	2	Alicja Jeromin	Poland	T47	12.19	Q, AR
3	3	Saška Sokolov	Serbia	T46	12.43	Q
4	7	Kiara Rodriguez	Ecuador	T46	12.54	q, PB
5	5	Aleksandra Moguchaia	RPC	T46	12.64	q, PB
6	4	Fernanda Yara da Silva	Brazil	T47	13.03	=PB
7	6	Ida-Louise Øverland	Norway	T47	13.20	
8	8	Aldana Ibañez	Argentina	T47	13.78	SB

=== Final ===
The final took place on 31 August 2021, at 20:18:

Rank	Lane	Name	Nationality	Class	Time	Notes
1st place, gold medalist(s)	4	Lisbeli Vera Andrade	Venezuela	T47	11.97	PB
2nd place, silver medalist(s)	5	Brittni Mason	United States	T46	11.97	
3rd place, bronze medalist(s)	7	Deja Young	United States	T46	12.21	SB
4	6	Alicja Jeromin	Poland	T47	12.22	
5	9	Saška Sokolov	Serbia	T46	12.48	
6	2	Kiara Rodriguez	Ecuador	T46	12.55	
7	8	Li Lu	China	T46	12.60	
8	3	Aleksandra Moguchaia	RPC	T46	12.71	
