= Athletics at the 2020 Summer Paralympics – Women's 400 metres T47 =

Women's 400 metres T47 at the XVI Paralympic Games
- Venue: Tokyo National Stadium
- Dates: 27 August 2021 (heats); 28 August 2021 (final)
- Competitors: 12 from 12 nations
- Winning time: 56.05

Medalists
1st place, gold medalist(s)		Anrune Weyers	South Africa
2nd place, silver medalist(s)		Lisbeli Vera Andrade	Venezuela
3rd place, bronze medalist(s)		Anastasiia Soloveva	RPC

The women's 400 metres T47 event at the 2020 Summer Paralympics in Tokyo took place between 27 and 28 August 2021.

The T47 category is for athletes who have a single below elbow or wrist amputation or similar disability, with normal function in both legs.

== Records ==
Prior to the competition, the existing records were as follows:

World Record	Anrune Weyers (RSA)	55.60	Huizingen, Belgium	24 August 2019
Paralympic Record	Yunidis Castillo (CUB)	55.72	London, United Kingdom	8 September 2012

Area	Time	Athlete	Nation
Africa	55.60 WR	Anrune Weyers	South Africa
America	55.72 PR	Yunidis Castillo	Cuba
Asia	57.23	Li Lu	China
Europe	56.11	Lioubov Vassilieva	Russia
Oceania	1:01.96	Alissa Jordaan	Australia

== Results ==
=== Heats ===
Heat 1 took place on 27 August 2021, at 21:25:

Rank	Lane	Name	Nationality	Class	Time	Notes
1	5	Anastasiia Soloveva	RPC	T47	57.27	Q, PB
2	3	Anrune Weyers	South Africa	T47	57.59	Q
3	8	Fernanda Yara da Silva	Brazil	T47	59.91	Q
4	6	Alissa Jordaan	Australia	T47	1:00.78	q, AR
5	4	Danielle Aravich	United States	T47	1:03.76	
6	7	Tabita Vulturar	Romania	T47	1:07.36	PB

Heat 2 took place on 27 August 2021, at 21:34:

Rank	Lane	Name	Nationality	Class	Time	Notes
1	3	Lisbeli Vera Andrade	Venezuela	T47	57.58	Q, PB
2	7	Li Lu	China	T46	58.31	Q, SB
3	8	Sae Tsuji	Japan	T47	59.98	Q
4	6	Amanda Cerna	Chile	T47	1:00.04	q, SB
5	5	Kadiatou Bangoura	Guinea	T46	1:02.75	PB
6	4	Adeline Mushiranzigo	Burundi	T47	1:16.84	SB

=== Final ===
The final took place on 28 August 2021, at 21:07:

Rank	Lane	Name	Nationality	Class	Time	Notes
1st place, gold medalist(s)	5	Anrune Weyers	South Africa	T47	56.05	SB
2nd place, silver medalist(s)	4	Lisbeli Vera Andrade	Venezuela	T47	57.32	PB
3rd place, bronze medalist(s)	6	Anastasiia Soloveva	RPC	T47	57.59	
4	7	Li Lu	China	T46	58.51	
5	8	Sae Tsuji	Japan	T47	58.98	
6	2	Amanda Cerna	Chile	T47	1:00.12	
7	3	Alissa Jordaan	Australia	T47	1:01.30	
	9	Fernanda Yara da Silva	Brazil	T47	DQ	WPA 18.5a
