= 2023 World Para Athletics Championships – Universal 4 × 100 metres relay =

The 4 x 100 metre Universal relay at the 2023 World Para Athletics Championships was held at Charlety Stadium, Paris, France, on 16 July.

== Medalists ==
Event	Gold	Silver	Bronze
Universal Relay	Japan; Uran Sawada (T12); Guide:Ryuhei Shiokawa; Sae Tsuji (T47); Takeru Matsumoto (T36); Tomoki Ikoma (T54)	Great Britain; Zachary Shaw (T12); Jonnie Peacock (T64); Sophie Hahn (T38); Samantha Kinghorn (T53)	Brazil; Jhulia Karol dos Santos (T11); Guide; Mateus Santos de Oliviera; Fernanda da Silva (T47); Ricardo Gomes (T37); Ariosvaldo Fernandes (T53)

== Universal Relay ==
The event final took place on 16 July.

Rank	Lane	Nation	Athletes	Time	Notes
1st place, gold medalist(s)	1	Japan (JPN)	Uran Sawada (T12); Guide:Ryuhei Shiokawa; Sae Tsuji (T47); Takeru Matsumoto (T36); Tomoki Ikoma (T54)	47.96	SB
2nd place, silver medalist(s)	3	Great Britain (GBR)	Zachary Shaw (T12); Jonnie Peacock (T64); Sophie Hahn (T38); Samantha Kinghorn (T53)	48.07	AR
3rd place, bronze medalist(s)	5	Brazil (BRA)	Jhulia Karol dos Santos (T11); Guide: Mateus Santos de Oliviera; Fernanda da Silva (T47); Ricardo Gomes (T37); Ariosvaldo Fernandes (T53)	48.25	SB
	7	Canada (CAN)	Bianca Borgella (T13); Marissa Papaconstantinou (T64); Zachary Gingras (T38); Austin Smeenk (T34)	DQ	23.6
