= Athletics at the 2020 Summer Paralympics – Mixed 4 × 100 metres relay =

Mixed 4 × 100 metres relay at the XVI Paralympic Games
- Venue: Tokyo National Stadium
- Dates: 3 September 2021
- Competitors: 40 from 10 nations

Medalists
1st place, gold medalist(s)		Noah Malone; Brittni Mason; Nick Mayhugh; Tatyana McFadden	United States
2nd place, silver medalist(s)		Libby Clegg (Guide – Chris Clarke); Jonnie Peacock; Ali Smith; Nathan Maguire	Great Britain
3rd place, bronze medalist(s)		Uran Sawada; Kengo Oshima; Yuka Takamatsu; Tomoki Suzuki	Japan

The mixed 4 × 100 metres relay event at the 2020 Summer Paralympics in Tokyo, took place on 3 September 2021.

== Records ==
Prior to the competition, the existing records were as follows:

World Record	China	46.35	Dubai, United Arab Emirates	14 November 2019
Paralympic Record	Vacant	–		

Area	Time	Nation
Africa	57.00	Record Mark
America	46.94	United States
Asia	46.35 WR	China
Europe	47.67	Russia
Oceania	52.41	Record Mark

== Results ==
=== Heats ===
Heat 1 took place on 3 September 2021, at 12:10:

Rank	Lane	Nation	Athletes	Time	Notes
1	7	China	Liu Cuiqing (T11); Wang Hao (T47); Wen Xiaoyan (T37); Zhang Ying (T54)	46.02	q, WR
2	3	Great Britain	Libby Clegg (T11); Jonnie Peacock (T64); Ali Smith (T38); Nathan Maguire (T54)	47.86	q, PB
3	5	Brazil	Lorena Salvatini (T11); Washington Júnior (T47); Ricardo Gomes de Mendonça (T37); Vanessa Cristina de Souza (T54)	49.84	PB

Heat 2 took place on 3 September 2021, at 12:23:

Rank	Lane	Nation	Athletes	Time	Notes
1	7	United States	Noah Malone (T12); Brittni Mason (T46); Nick Mayhugh (T37); Tatyana McFadden (T54)	46.72	q, AR
2	5	Japan	Uran Sawada (T12); Kengo Oshima (T64); Yuka Takamatsu (T38); Tomoki Suzuki (T54)	47.94	q, PB
3	3	France	Timothée Adolphe (T11); Angelina Lanza (T47); Mandy François-Elie (T37); Julien Casoli (T54)	48.26	PB

Heat 3 took place on 3 September 2021, at 12:36:

Rank	Lane	Nation	Athletes	Time	Notes
1	5	Germany	Marcel Boettger (T12); David Behre (T62); Lindy Ave (T38); Merle Menje (T54)	48.21	
2	1	RPC	Roman Tarasov (T12); Anastasiia Soloveva (T47); Viktoriia Slanova (T37); Vitalii Gritsenko (T53)	48.90	
3	7	Canada	Austin Ingram (T13); Marissa Papaconstantinou (T64); Zachary Gingras (T38); Jessica Frotten (T53)	49.38	
4	3	Indonesia	Putri Aulia (T13); Karisma Evi Tiarani (T42); Saptoyoga Purnomo (T37); Jaenal Aripin (T54)	50.55	

=== Final ===
The final took place on 3 September 2021, at 21:17:

Rank	Lane	Nation	Athletes	Time	Notes
1st place, gold medalist(s)	5	United States	Noah Malone (T12); Brittni Mason (T46); Nick Mayhugh (T37); Tatyana McFadden (T54)	45.52	WR
2nd place, silver medalist(s)	7	Great Britain	Libby Clegg (T11) (Guide – Chris Clarke); Jonnie Peacock (T64); Ali Smith (T38); Nathan Maguire (T54)	47.50	AR
3rd place, bronze medalist(s)	1	Japan	Uran Sawada (T12); Kengo Oshima (T64); Yuka Takamatsu (T38); Tomoki Suzuki (T54)	47.98	
	3	China	Liu Cuiqing (T11); Wang Hao (T47); Wen Xiaoyan (T37); Zhang Ying (T54)	DQ	WPA 7.10.4
