= Athletics at the 2024 Summer Paralympics – Women's 400 metres T20 =

Women's 400 metres T20 at the XVII Paralympic Games
- Venue: Stade de France
- Dates: 2-3 September 2024
- Competitors: 13 from 13 nations
- Winning time: 55.16

Medalists
1st place, gold medalist(s)		Yuliia Shuliar	Ukraine
2nd place, silver medalist(s)		Aysel Onder	Turkey
3rd place, bronze medalist(s)		Deepthi Jeevanji	India

400 metres at the 2024 Summer Paralympics
Men · T11 · T12 · T13 · T20 · T36 · T37 · T38 · T47 · T52 · T53 · T54 · T62
Women · T11 · T12 · T13 · T20 · T37 · T38 · T47 · T53 · T54 ·

The women's 400 metres T20 event at the 2024 Summer Paralympics in Paris took place on 3-4 September 2024.

== Classification ==
The event is open to T20 athletes. These athletes have an intellectual impairment.

== Records ==
Prior to the competition, the existing records were as follows:

World record	Deepthi Jeevanji (IND)	55.07	(Japan) Kobe	20 May 2024
Paralympic record	Breanna Clark (USA)	55.18	(Japan) Tokyo	31 August 2021

Area	Time		Athlete	Location	Date
Africa	1:06.37		(Mauritius) Ashley Telvave	(United Arab Emirates) Sharjah	22 February 2023
America	55.12		(United States) Breanna Clark	(France) Paris	12 July 2023
Asia	55.07	WR	(India) Deepthi Jeevanji	(Japan) Kobe	20 May 2024
Europe	56.18		(Ukraine) Yuliia Shuliar	(Japan) Tokyo	31 August 2021
Oceania	1:02.73		Record mark		

== Results ==
=== Heats ===
The heats were held on 2 September. First 3 in each heat (Q) and the next 2 fastest (q) advance to the final.

=== Heat 1 ===
Rank	Lane	Athlete	Nation	Time	Notes
1	6	Deepthi Jeevanji	India	55.45	Q
2	4	Yuliia Shuliar	Ukraine	56.49	Q, SB
3	9	Antonia Keyla da Silva Barros	Brazil	57.54	Q,
4	8	Carina Paim	Portugal	58.37	
5	3	María Alejandra Murillo	Colombia	59.52	SB
6	5	Orawan Kaising	Thailand	1:02:52	
7	7	Kiara Maene	Belgium	1:06:25	

=== Heat 2 ===
Rank	Lane	Athlete	Nation	Time	Notes
1	5	Aysel Onder	Turkey	54.96	Q, WR
2	6	Breanna Clark	United States	56.32	Q, SB
3	4	Leonela Coromoto Vera Colina	Venezuela	56.41	Q, PB
4	6	Lizanshela Angulo	Ecuador	57.35	q
5	9	Telaya Blacksmith	Australia	57.96	q, AR
6	7	Diane Carolina Vivenes Paula	Dominican Republic	59.23	

=== Final ===
The final took place on 3 September.

Rank	Lane	Athlete	Nation	Time	Notes
1st place, gold medalist(s)	6	Yuliia Shuliar	Ukraine	55.16	PB
2nd place, silver medalist(s)	8	Aysel Onder	Turkey	55.23	
3rd place, bronze medalist(s)	7	Deepthi Jeevanji	India	55.82	
4	5	Breanna Clark	United States	56.43	
5	9	Leonela Coromoto Vera Colina	Venezuela	57.18	
6	3	Lizanshela Angulo	Ecuador	57.90	
7	4	Antonia Keyla da Silva Barros	Brazil	58.34	
8	2	Telaya Blacksmith	Australia	59.30	
