= Athletics at the 2016 Summer Paralympics – Women's 200 metres T47 =

Women's 200 metres T47 at the XV Paralympic Games
- Venue: Estádio Olímpico João Havelange
- Dates: 16 September 2016
- Competitors: 13 from 13 nations

Medalists
1st place, gold medalist(s)		Deja Young	United States
2nd place, silver medalist(s)		Alicja Fiodorow	Poland
3rd place, bronze medalist(s)		Li Lu	China

The T47 category is for athletes who have a single below elbow or wrist amputation or similar disability, with normal function in both legs.

The Athletics at the 2016 Summer Paralympics – Women's 200 metres T47 event at the 2016 Paralympic Games took place on 16 September 2016, at the Estádio Olímpico João Havelange.

== Heats ==
=== Heat 1 ===
18:33 15 September 2016:

Rank	Lane	Bib	Name	Nationality	Reaction	Time	Notes
1	8	689	Alicja Fiodorow	Poland		25.85	Q
2	7	737	Anrune Liebenberg	South Africa		26.63	Q
3	3	479	Sae Tsuji	Japan		27.99	Q
4	4	676	Yeny Vargas	Peru		31.49	
	6	290	Yengus Dese Azenaw	Ethiopia		DQ	R18.5
	5	100	Teresinha de Jesus Correia Santos	Brazil		DNS	

=== Heat 2 ===
18:39 15 September 2016:

Rank	Lane	Bib	Name	Nationality	Reaction	Time	Notes
1	5	919	Deja Young	United States		25.58	Q
2	4	307	Angelina Lanza	France		26.77	Q
3	7	166	Li Lu	China		27.20	Q
4	2	771	Amara Indumathi Karunathi Lallwala Palliya G.	Sri Lanka		27.55	q
5	6	152	Amanda Cerna	Chile		28.17	q
	8	648	Anna Grimaldi	New Zealand		DQ	R18.5
	3	240	Yunidis Castillo	Cuba		DNS	

== Final ==
11:27 16 September 2016:

Rank	Lane	Bib	Name	Nationality	Reaction	Time	Notes
1st place, gold medalist(s)	4	919	Deja Young	United States		25.46	
2nd place, silver medalist(s)	6	689	Alicja Fiodorow	Poland		25.61	
3rd place, bronze medalist(s)	7	166	Li Lu	China		26.26	
4	5	737	Anrune Liebenberg	South Africa		26.57	
5	3	307	Angelina Lanza	France		26.60	
6	1	771	Amara Indumathi Karunathi Lallwala Palliya G.	Sri Lanka		27.54	
7	8	479	Sae Tsuji	Japan		27.97	
8	2	152	Amanda Cerna	Chile		28.19	
