= Brittni Mason =

American Paralympic sprinter (born 1998)

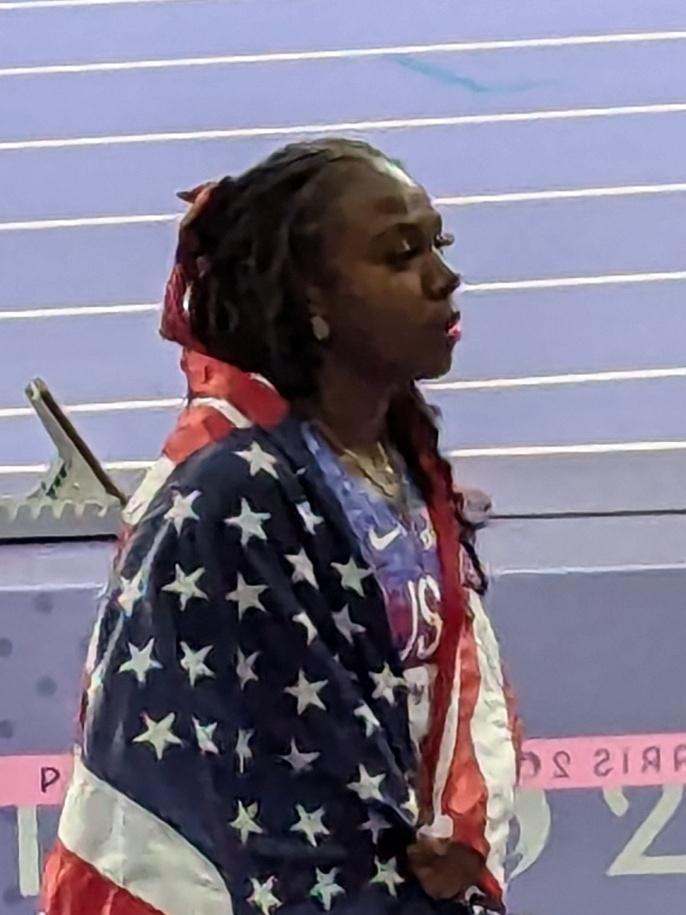
- Mason at the 2024 Summer Paralympics

Personal information
- Born: April 19, 1998 (age 28) Cleveland, Ohio, U.S.
- Height: 5 ft 3 in (1.60 m)

Sport
- Sport: Paralympic athletics
- Disability: Erb's palsy
- Disability class: T47
- Events: 100 meters; 200 meters
- Club: Eastern Michigan Eagles

Achievements and titles
- Personal bests: 100 m T47: 11.89; 200 m T47: 25.00
Medal record
Paralympic athletics
Representing the United States
Summer Paralympics
Gold medal – first place	2020 Tokyo	Mixed 4×100 m relay
Silver medal – second place	2020 Tokyo	100 m T47
Silver medal – second place	2020 Tokyo	200 m T47
Silver medal – second place	2024 Paris	100 m T47
Silver medal – second place	2024 Paris	200 m T47
World Championships
Gold medal – first place	2019 Dubai	100 m T47
Gold medal – first place	2023 Paris	200 m T47
Silver medal – second place	2023 Paris	100 m T47
Silver medal – second place	2024 Kobe	200 m T47

Brittni Mason (born April 19, 1998) is an American Paralympic sprinter. Born with Erb's palsy limiting her movement in her left shoulder and arm, she has won gold medals in the 100 meters at the 2019 World Para Athletics Championships, mixed 4 × 100 meters relay at the 2020 Summer Paralympics, and the 200 meters at the 2023 World Para Athletics Championships, under the T47 class.

== Early life ==
Brittni Mason was born April 19, 1998, in Cleveland, Ohio, to Richard and Cherree. She was born with Erb's palsy, causing limited movement in her left shoulder and arm. She was put into physical therapy by her parents as a child, and began to play several sports, including track and field, around the age of ten. She attended West Geauga High School, where she set the 100 and 200 meter dash records at her school district, won multiple championships, and graduated in 2016. She is majoring in exercise physiology at Eastern Michigan University.

== Career ==
Mason ran at Eastern Michigan University, and her coach was contacted regarding whether she would like to compete in parasports. Despite her Erb's palsy, Mason was not aware that she was qualified to participate in parasports as she had competed alongside able-bodied runners her entire life.

Mason competed at the 2019 World Para Athletics Championships in Dubai at 21 years old, winning gold in the women's 100-meter T47 competition. Mason went on to represent the United States at the 2020 Summer Paralympics in Tokyo and won a gold medal in the mixed 4 × 100 meters relay and silver medals in the 100 meters and 200 meters T47 events. She also competed at the 2024 Summer Paralympics in Paris, winning silver medals in the 100 meters and 200 meters T47 events.

Mason is a prominent member of the American parasports movement, frequently featuring in interviews, feature stories, and advertisements. She has stated that her frequent media appearances are an opportunity for her to bring more attention to the Paralympics and to help people who, like herself, may not have been aware that they could qualify for parasports. She has said that she wants to be a role model for younger generations.

== Career statistics ==
Representing the United States
Year	Competition	Venue	Event	Position	Time	Notes	Refs.
2019	World Para Athletics Championships	Dubai	100 m T47	1st (heat 2)	0:12.01	CR	
2019	World Para Athletics Championships	Dubai	100 m T47	1st	0:11.89	WR	
2019	World Para Athletics Championships	Dubai	200 m T47	1st (heat 3)	0:25.11		
2019	World Para Athletics Championships	Dubai	200 m T47	4th	0:25.15		
2021	2020 Summer Paralympics (Note: The 2020 Summer Paralympics were rescheduled from 2020 to 2021 due to the COVID-19 pandemic but kept its name.)	Tokyo	100 m T47	1st (heat 2)	0:12.07		
2021	2020 Summer Paralympics	Tokyo	100 m T47	2nd	0:11.97		
2021	2020 Summer Paralympics	Tokyo	200 m T47	2nd (heat 2)	0:25.22		
2021	2020 Summer Paralympics	Tokyo	200 m T47	2nd	0:25.00		
2021	2020 Summer Paralympics	Tokyo	Mixed 4 × 100 m relay (Note: Alongside Noah Malone, Nick Mayhugh, and Tatyana McFadden)	1st (heat 2)	0:46.72		
2021	2020 Summer Paralympics	Tokyo	Mixed 4 × 100 m relay	1st	0:45.52		
2023	World Para Athletics Championships	Paris	100 m T47	1st (heat 1)	0:12.38		
2023	World Para Athletics Championships	Paris	100 m T47	2nd	0:12.24	SB	
2023	World Para Athletics Championships	Paris	200 m T47	1st (heat 2)	0:25.72	SB	
2023	World Para Athletics Championships	Paris	200 m T47	1st	0:25.36	SB	
2024	World Para Athletics Championships	Kobe	200 m T47	1st (heat 2)	0:25.48	SB	
2024	World Para Athletics Championships	Kobe	200 m T47	2nd	0:25.10	SB	
2024	World Para Athletics Championships	Kobe	Mixed 4 × 100 m relay (Note: Alongside Noah Malone, Taylor Swanson, and Bob Hunt)	DQ (heat 2)	—N/a		
2024	Summer Paralympics	Paris	100 m T47	2nd (heat 2)	0:12.18	SB	
2024	Summer Paralympics	Paris	100 m T47	2nd	0:12.10	SB	
2024	Summer Paralympics	Paris	200 m T47	2nd (heat 2)	0:25.61		
2024	Summer Paralympics	Paris	200 m T47	2nd	0:25.18		
