= Athletics at the 2024 Summer Paralympics – Men's 100 metres T12 =

Men's 100 metres T12 at the XVII Paralympic Games
- Venue: Stade de France
- Dates: 30 August (round 1); 31 August (final)
- Competitors: 10 from 8 nations
- Winning time: 10.71

Medalists
1st place, gold medalist(s)		Noah Malone	United States
2nd place, silver medalist(s)		Joeferson Marinho	Brazil
3rd place, bronze medalist(s)		Zac Shaw	Great Britain

100 metres at the 2024 Summer Paralympics
Men · T11 · T12 · T13 · T34 · T35 · T36 · T37 · T38 · T44 · T47 · T51 · T52 · T53 · T54 · T63 · T64
Women · T11 · T12 · T13 · T34 · T35 · T36 · T37 · T38 · T47 · T53 · T54 · T63 · T64

The men's 100 metres T12 event at the 2024 Summer Paralympics in Paris, took place on 30 and 31 August 2024.

The T12 category is for athletes with visual impairment. Athletes in this category will generally have some residual sight, the ability to recognise the shape of a hand at a distance of 2 metres and the ability to perceive clearly will be no more than 2/60. T12 athletes commonly run with guides.

== Records ==
Prior to the competition, the existing records were as follows:

World record	Salum Ageze Kashafali (NOR)	10.43	(Japan) Tokyo	29 August 2021
Paralympic record	Salum Ageze Kashafali (NOR)	10.43	(Japan) Tokyo	29 August 2021

Area	Time		Athlete	Location	Date
Africa	10.75		(Nigeria) Adekunle Adesoji	(Greece) Athens	22 September 2004
America	10.50		(United States) Noah Malone	(France) Paris	9 July 2023
Asia	10.91		(China) Li Yansong	(United Kingdom) London	4 September 2012
Europe	10.43	WR	(Norway) Salum Ageze Kashafali	(Japan) Tokyo	29 August 2021
Oceania	12.18		(Fiji) Fuata Faktaufon	(South Korea) Busan	27 October 2002

== Results ==
=== Round 1 ===
First in each heat (Q) and the next 1 fastest (q) advance to the Final. The 3 heats were held on 30 August 2024.

==== Heat 1 ====
Rank	Lane	Athlete	Nation	Time	Notes
1	7	Noah Malone	United States	10.75	Q
2	5	Jaco Smit	South Africa	11.12	
3	3	Marcos Vinícius	Brazil	11.61	
				Wind: -0.2 m/s	

==== Heat 2 ====
Rank	Lane	Athlete	Nation	Time	Notes
1	7	Zac Shaw	Great Britain	11.15	Q
2	1	Kesley Teodoro	Brazil	11.16	
3	5	Abdul Razzag Abdul Samad	Maldives	14.46	SB
–	3	Fernando Vázquez	Argentina	DQ	R17.8
				Wind: -0.6 m/s	

==== Heat 3 ====
Rank	Lane	Athlete	Nation	Time	Notes
~~1~~	~~1~~	~~Serkan Yıldırım~~	~~Turkey~~	~~10.89~~	~~Q~~
2	7	Joeferson Marinho	Brazil	11.01	q
3	3	Roman Tarasov	Neutral Paralympic Athletes	11.07	SB
4	5	Mouncef Bouja	Morocco	11.14	
				Wind: 0.0 m/s	

=== Final ===
The final took place on 31 August 2024.

Rank	Lane	Athlete	Nation	Time	Notes
1st place, gold medalist(s)	3	Noah Malone	United States	10.71	
2nd place, silver medalist(s)	1	Joeferson Marinho	Brazil	10.84	
3rd place, bronze medalist(s)	7	Zac Shaw	Great Britain	10.94	
–	5	~~Serkan Yıldırım~~	~~Turkey~~	DQ (10.70)	
				Wind: -0.3m/s	

== Yıldırım Disqualification ==
Serkan Yıldırım was initially prohibited from competing due to his T12 classification being under review by World Para Athletics prior to the event. An injunction was approved by a Bonn regional court on 30 August 2024, allowing Yıldırım to compete. On 3 September 2024. This injunction was lifted on appeal by World Para Athletics, leading to his disqualification.
