= Pavade =

Pavade may refer to:

- Dimitri Pavadé French para-athlete
- Prithika Pavade French table tennis player
