= Athletics at the 2016 Summer Paralympics – Women's 400 metres T47 =

Women's 400 metres T47 at the XV Paralympic Games
- Venue: Estádio Olímpico João Havelange
- Dates: 14 September 2016
- Competitors: 10 from 10 nations

Medalists
1st place, gold medalist(s)		Lu Li	China
2nd place, silver medalist(s)		Anrune Liebenberg	South Africa
3rd place, bronze medalist(s)		Sae Tsuji	Japan

The T47 category is for athletes who have a single below elbow or wrist amputation or similar disability, with normal function in both legs.

The Athletics at the 2016 Summer Paralympics – Women's 400 metres T47 event at the 2016 Paralympic Games took place on 14 September 2016, at the Estádio Olímpico João Havelange.

== Heats ==
=== Heat 1 ===
10:00 13 September 2016:

Rank	Lane	Bib	Name	Nationality	Reaction	Time	Notes
1	6	166	Lu Li	China		1:00.77	Q
2	4	479	Sae Tsuji	Japan		1:01.85	Q
3	7	771	Amara Indumathi Karunathi Lallwala Palliya G.	Sri Lanka		1:02.07	Q
4	3	916	Amy Watt	United States		1:04.56	q
	5	240	Yunidis Castillo	Cuba			DSQ

=== Heat 2 ===
10:07 13 September 2016:

Rank	Lane	Bib	Name	Nationality	Reaction	Time	Notes
1	4	737	Anrune Liebenberg	South Africa		1:01.79	Q
2	6	100	Teresinha de Jesus Correia Santos	Brazil		1:01.88	Q
3	3	152	Amanda Cerna	Chile		1:02.03	Q
4	5	676	Yeny Vargas	Peru		1:09.23	q
	7	290	Yengus Dese Azenaw	Ethiopia			DSQ

== Final ==
18:26 14 September 2016:

Rank	Lane	Bib	Name	Nationality	Reaction	Time	Notes
1st place, gold medalist(s)	6	166	Lu Li	China		58.09	
2nd place, silver medalist(s)	4	737	Anrune Liebenberg	South Africa		58.88	
3rd place, bronze medalist(s)	3	479	Sae Tsuji	Japan		1:00.62	
4	8	152	Amanda Cerna	Chile		1:01.48	
5	7	771	Amara Indumathi Karunathi Lallwala Palliya G.	Sri Lanka		1:01.74	
6	1	916	Amy Watt	United States		1:04.21	
7	2	676	Yeny Vargas	Peru		1:09.63	
	5	100	Teresinha de Jesus Correia Santos	Brazil			DSQ
