= Athletics at the 2022 Asian Para Games – Men's 200 metres =

Men's 200 metres at the 2022 Asian Para Games
- Venue: Yellow Dragon Sports Center
- Location: Hangzhou, China
- Dates: 23 – 25 October
- Competitors: 18 from 12 nations

The Men's 200m athletics events for the 2022 Asian Para Games took place at the Yellow Dragon Sports Center from 23 to 27 October, 2023. A total of 4 events were contested over this distance.

== Schedule ==
F	Final

Date	Mon 23		Tue 24		Wed 25		Thu 26		Fri 27		Sat 28	
Event	M	E	M	E	M	E	M	E	M	E	M	E
T35 200m					F							
T37 200m					F							
T52 200m					F							
T64 200m	F											

== Results ==
=== T35 ===
==== Records ====
Prior to this competition, the existing world, Asian and Games records were as follows.

World Record	(Russia) Dmitrii Safronov	23.00	(Japan) Tokyo	September 4, 2021
Asian Record	(China) Fu Xinhan	26.21	(United Kingdom) London	September 6, 2012
Games Record	(Saudi Arabia) Ahmed Adawi	30.39	(Indonesia) Jakarta	October 8, 2018

==== Final ====
Final held on 25 October 2023.

Rank	Lane	Name	Nationality	Time	Notes
1st place, gold medalist(s)	7	Alireza Zare	Iran	25.51	AR
2nd place, silver medalist(s)	8	Idrees Al-Zaidi	Iraq	26.54	PB
3rd place, bronze medalist(s)	6	Narayan Thakur	India	29.83	
4	4	Bao Chui Yiu	Hong Kong	30.87	SB
5	5	Ravi Kumar	India	31.28	

=== T37 ===
==== Records ====
Prior to this competition, the existing world, Asian and Games records were as follows.

World Record	(United States) Nick Mayhugh	21.91	(Japan) Tokyo	September 4, 2021
Asian Record	(China) Shang Guangxu	22.70	(Qatar) Doha	October 22, 2015
Games Record	(China) Shang Guangxu	23.41	(South Korea) Incheon	October 22, 2014

==== Final ====
Final held on 25 October 2023.

Rank	Lane	Name	Nationality	Time	Notes
1st place, gold medalist(s)	4	Saptoyoga Purnomo	Indonesia	23.34	GR
2nd place, silver medalist(s)	8	Ali Yousef Al-Nakhli	Saudi Arabia	24.75	SB
3rd place, bronze medalist(s)	5	Shreyansh Trivedi	India	25.26	
4	6	Thamer Ahmed Al-Zahrani	Saudi Arabia	25.41	PB
5	7	Lionel Toh	Singapore	27.37	SB

=== T52 ===
==== Records ====
Prior to this competition, the existing world, Asian and Games records were as follows.

T51	World Record	(Finland) Toni Piispanen	36.35	(Finland) Jyväskylä	August 8, 2021
T51	Asian Record	(Japan) Masanori Ueda	41.03	(Greece) Athens	September 25, 2004
T52	World Record	(Belgium) Maxime Carabin	29.88	(Belgium) Ninove	July 16, 2022
T52	Asian Record	(Japan) Yuki Oya	31.11	(Japan) Kumagaya	September 5, 2020
T52	Games Record	(Thailand) Pichaya Kurattanasiri	32.85	(South Korea) Incheon	October 22, 2014

==== Final ====
Final held on 24 October 2023.

Rank	Lane	Name	Nationality	Class	Time	Notes
1st place, gold medalist(s)	5	Jeong Jong-dae	South Korea	T52	32.43	GR
2nd place, silver medalist(s)	6	Pichaya Kurattanasiri	Thailand	T52	33.69	SB
	7	Mohamed Al-Shook	Bahrain	T51	DSQ	DQ R18.5 (a)

=== T64 ===
==== Records ====
Prior to this competition, the existing world, Asian and Games records were as follows.

World Record	(United States) Richard Browne	21.27	(Qatar) Doha	October 25, 2015
Asian Record	(Japan) Shunsuke Itani	23.49	(United Arab Emirates) Dubai	October 22, 2019
Games Record	(Japan) Keita Sato	24.15	(South Korea) Incheon	October 22, 2014

==== Final ====
Final held on 23 October 2023.

Rank	Lane	Name	Nationality	Time	Notes
1st place, gold medalist(s)	6	Shunsuke Itani	Japan	22.99	AR
2nd place, silver medalist(s)	4	Kengo Oshima	Japan	23.61	SB
3rd place, bronze medalist(s)	2	Pea Soe	Myanmar	24.04	
4	7	Pranav Prashant Desai	India	24.24	PB
5	3	Denpoom Kotcharang	Thailand	24.63	
6	5	Arz Zahreddine	Lebanon	24.94	SB
