= Athletics at the 2020 Summer Paralympics – Women's 400 metres T20 =

Women's 400 metres T20 at the XVI Paralympic Games
- Venue: Tokyo National Stadium
- Dates: 30 August 2021 (heats); 31 August 2021 (final)
- Competitors: 12 from 11 nations
- Winning time: 55.18

Medalists
1st place, gold medalist(s)		Breanna Clark	United States
2nd place, silver medalist(s)		Yuliia Shuliar	Ukraine
3rd place, bronze medalist(s)		Jardênia Felix Barbosa da Silva	Brazil

The women's 400 metres T20 event at the 2020 Summer Paralympics in Tokyo, took place between 30 and 31 August 2021.

The T20 category is for athletes with intellectual impairment. T20 athletes have an IQ score of 75 or less.

== Records ==
Prior to the competition, the existing records were as follows:

World Record	Breanna Clark (USA)	55.99	Tempe, United States	16 June 2018
Paralympic Record	Breanna Clark (USA)	57.79	Rio de Janeiro, Brazil	13 September 2016

Area	Time	Athlete	Nation
Africa	1:09.92	Ashley Telvave	Mauritius
America	55.99 WR	Breanna Clark	United States
Asia	58.55	Siti Noor Iasah Mohamad Ariffin	Malaysia
Europe	56.83	Yuliia Shuliar	Ukraine
Oceania	1:02.73	Record Mark	

== Results ==
=== Heats ===
Heat 1 took place on 30 August 2021, at 20:15:

Rank	Lane	Name	Nationality	Time	Notes
1	3	Yuliia Shuliar	Ukraine	57.58	Q, GR
2	5	Jardênia Felix Barbosa da Silva	Brazil	59.14	Q
3	6	Justyna Franieczek	Poland	59.50	Q
4	4	Aimi Toyama	Japan	1:00.17	q, SB
5	7	Orawan Kaising	Thailand	1:03.06	SB
6	8	Ilona Biacsi	Hungary	1:03.78	

Heat 2 took place on 30 August 2021, at 20:22:

Rank	Lane	Name	Nationality	Time	Notes
1	6	Breanna Clark	United States	56.07	Q, GR
2	4	Carina Paim	Portugal	59.43	Q
3	7	Norkelys del Carmen Gonzalez	Venezuela	59.49	Q, SB
4	5	Siti Noor Iasah Mohamad Ariffin	Malaysia	59.89	q, SB
5	3	Elvin Elhudia Sesa	Indonesia	1:04.34	
6	8	Bernadett Biacsi	Hungary	1:07.35	

=== Final ===
The final took place on 31 August 2021, at 20:38:

Rank	Lane	Name	Nationality	Time	Notes
1st place, gold medalist(s)	5	Breanna Clark	United States	55.18	WR
2nd place, silver medalist(s)	7	Yuliia Shuliar	Ukraine	56.18	AR
3rd place, bronze medalist(s)	6	Jardênia Felix Barbosa da Silva	Brazil	57.43	PB
4	4	Carina Paim	Portugal	58.83	
5	8	Justyna Franieczek	Poland	59.14	
6	9	Norkelys del Carmen Gonzalez	Venezuela	59.74	
7	3	Aimi Toyama	Japan	59.99	SB
8	2	Siti Noor Iasah Mohamad Ariffin	Malaysia	1:01.05	
