= Athletics at the 2020 Summer Paralympics – Men's 100 metres T12 =

Men's 100 metres T12 at the XVI Paralympic Games
- Venue: Tokyo National Stadium
- Dates: 27 August 2021 (heats); 29 August 2021 (final)
- Competitors: 12 from 9 nations
- Winning time: 10.43

Medalists
1st place, gold medalist(s)		Salum Ageze Kashafali	Norway
2nd place, silver medalist(s)		Noah Malone	United States
3rd place, bronze medalist(s)		Roman Tarasov	RPC

Men's 100 metres
T11 · T12 · T13 · T33 · T34 · T35 · T36 · T37 · T38 · T47 · T51 · T52 · T53 · T54 · T63 · T64

The men's 100 metres T12 event at the 2020 Summer Paralympics in Tokyo, took place between 27 and 29 August 2021.

The T12 category is for athletes with visual impairment. Athletes in this category will generally have some residual sight, the ability to recognise the shape of a hand at a distance of 2 metres and the ability to perceive clearly will be no more than 2/60. T12 athletes commonly run with guides.

== Records ==
Prior to the competition, the existing records were as follows:

World Record	Salum Ageze Kashafali (NOR)	10.45	Oslo, Norway	13 June 2019
Paralympic Record	Adekunle Adesoji (NGR)	10.75	Athens, Greece	22 September 2004

Area	Time	Athlete	Nation
Africa	10.75 PR	Adekunle Adesoji	Nigeria
America	10.66	Noah Malone	United States
Asia	10.91	Li Yansong	China
Europe	10.45 WR	Salum Ageze Kashafali	Norway
Oceania	12.18	Fuata Faktaufon	Fiji

== Results ==
=== Heats ===
Heat 1 took place on 27 August 2021, at 10:14:

Rank	Lane	Name	Nationality	Time	Notes
1	1	Salum Ageze Kashafali	Norway	10.46	Q , PR
2	3	Fabrício Barros	Brazil	11.13	
3	5	Jonathan Ntutu	South Africa	11.23	SB
4	7	Yamil Acosta	Colombia	11.50	SB

Heat 2 took place on 27 August 2021, at 10:21:

Rank	Lane	Name	Nationality	Time	Notes
1	1	Noah Malone	United States	10.55	Q, AR
2	3	Roman Tarasov	RPC	10.83	q, SB
3	5	Abdeslam Hili	Morocco	11.00	PB
4	7	Kesley Teodoro	Brazil	11.47	

Heat 3 took place on 27 August 2021, at 10:28:

Rank	Lane	Name	Nationality	Time	Notes
1	1	Joeferson Marinho	Brazil	10.85	Q, SB
2	3	Leinier Savón Pineda	Cuba	10.91	
3	7	Mahdi Afri	Morocco	10.96	PB
	5	Marcel Boettger	Germany	DQ	WPA 7.9.3

=== Final ===
The final took place on 29 August 2021, at 21:04:

Rank	Lane	Name	Nationality	Time	Notes
1st place, gold medalist(s)	3	Salum Ageze Kashafali	Norway	10.43	WR
2nd place, silver medalist(s)	5	Noah Malone	United States	10.66	
3rd place, bronze medalist(s)	1	Roman Tarasov	RPC	10.88	
4	7	Joeferson Marinho	Brazil	11.24	
