= 2021 World Para Athletics European Championships – Universal 4 × 100 metres relay =

The universal 4 × 100 metres relay event was held at the 2021 World Para Athletics European Championships in Bydgoszcz, Poland.

== Medalists ==
| Event | Gold | | Silver | | Bronze | |
|---|---|---|---|---|---|---|
| Universal 4 × 100 metres relay | Russia; Roman Tarasov; Anastasiia Soloveva; Viktoriia Slanova; Aleksei Bychenok | 47.67 ER | United Kingdom; Zachary Shaw; Sophie Kamlish; Sophie Hahn; Nathan Maguire | 48.20 | France; Lucile Razet; Dimitri Pavadé; Mandy François-Elie; Julien Casoli | 50.44 |
WR world record | ER European record | CR championship record | NR national record | WL world leading | EL European leading | PB personal best | SB seasonal best

== See also ==
- List of IPC world records in athletics
