= Aysel Önder =

Turkish Paralympic athlete (born 2005)

Personal information
- Born: 24 June 2005 (age 21) Hatay, Turkey

Sport
- Country: Turkey
- Sport: Athletics
- Disability class: T20
- Event: 400 m
- Club: Enka SK
- Coached by: Damla Tan
Medal record
Track and field
Representing Turkey
Paralympic Games
| Silver medal – second place | 2024 Paris | 400 m T20 |
World Championships
| Gold medal – first place | 2025 New Delhi | 400 m T20 |
| Silver medal – second place | 2024 Kobe | 400 m T20 |
Virtus Open European Athlics
| Gold medal – first place | 2024 Uppsala | 200 m ER |
| Gold medal – first place | 2024 Uppsala | 400 m |
| Gold medal – first place | 2024 Uppsala | 4x100 m relay WR |
| Gold medal – first place | 2024 Uppsala | 4x200 m Mixed relay ER |
| Gold medal – first place | 2024 Uppsala | 4x400 m relay |
Virtus World Indoor Athletics
| Silver medal – second place | 2024 Reims | 200 m |
| Gold medal – first place | 2024 Reims | 400 m WR |
| Gold medal – first place | 2024 Reims | 4x200 m relay WR |

Aysel Önder (born 24 June 2005) is a Turkish Paralympian athlete. She has many world indoor and European champion titles, and is holder of several world, Paralympics and European records. She competes in the T20 disability class sprint event of 400 m.

== Early years in sport ==
As Önder was 13 years of age, she played football. Her physical education teacher took her one day to an athletics competition with, where she came first in her first race. Later, she was taken to cross country running competitions. She attracted the attention of the athletics coach Damla Tan, who contacted her parents to persuade her to switch over to athletics. As she was more interested in football playing, she practized both sports together for about one or one and half years together. Finally, chose athletics. She plays sometimes football as a hobby, together with her brothers.

== Sport career ==
She is a member of Enka SK in Istanbul, where she is coached by Damla Tan.

At the 2024 Virtus World Indoor Athletics in Reims, France, she won the gold medal in the 400 m event and set a new indoor world record with 57.54. She took the silver medal in the 200 m with 25.12, and another gold medal in the 4x200 m relay, setting one more indoor world record with 1:46.82.

Önder took the silver medal in the 400 m event with 55.19 at the 2024 World Para Athletics Championships in Kobe, Japan.

She captured five gold medals in total at the 2024 Virtus European Athletics Championship in Uppsala, Sweden, namely in the 400 m with 57.54, in the 200 m with 24.87 setting a new European record, in the 4x100 m with 49.93 setting a new world record, in the 4x200 m mixed relay with 1:38.69 setting a new European record and in the 4x400 m relay with 4:09.91.

Önder is qualified to represent her country at the 2024 Summer Paralympics in Paris, France as the first athlete from Turkey in the 400 m T20 event.

She finished the heat 2 of the 400 m T20 event on the first place, and set a new world and Paralympics record with 54.96 on 2 August 2024. In the final round, she won the silver medal with 55.23 only 0.07 seconds behind the gold medalist.

As of 2024, Önder ranks second in the world list.

== Personal life ==
Aysel Önder was born in Hatay, southern Turkey on 24 June 2005. She completed her primary and secondary education in İzmir.
