= Uran Sawada =

Japanese para-athlete (born 1990)

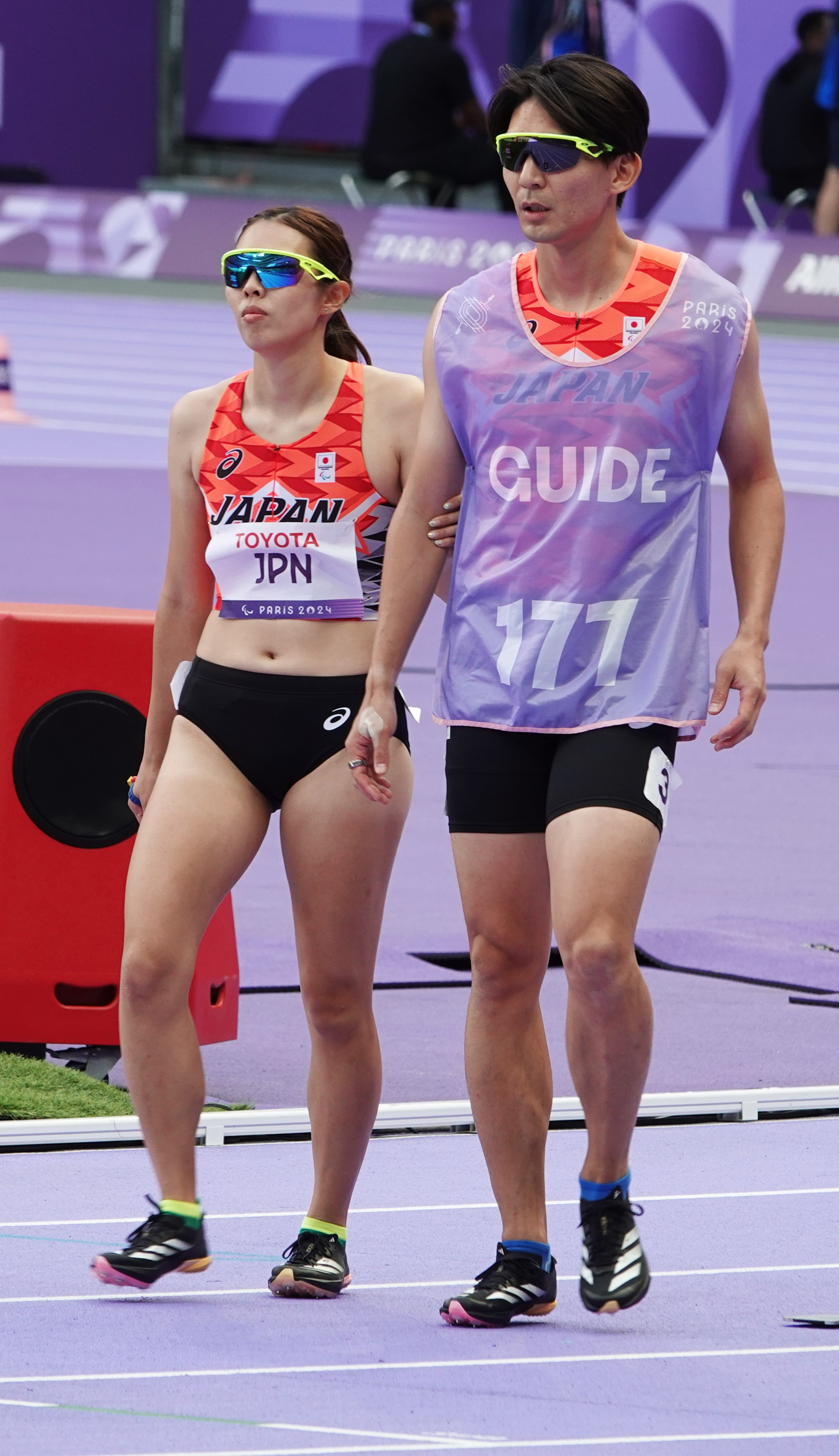
- 2024 Summer Paralympics in Paris

Personal information
- Nationality: Japanese
- Born: October 24, 1990 (age 35) Saitama, Japan

Sport
- Country: Japan
- Sport: Track and field (F12)
Medal record
Paralympic Games
Bronze medal – third place	2020 Tokyo	4 × 100 metres
World Championships
Gold medal – first place	2023 Paris	4x100m Universal Relay
Bronze medal – third place	2023 Paris	Long jump T12
Bronze medal – third place	2024 Kobe	Long jump T12
Asian Para Games
Gold medal – first place	2010 Guangzhou	100m T13
Gold medal – first place	2018 Jakarta	100m T12
Bronze medal – third place	2022 Hangzhou	4×100 m universal relay

Uran Sawada (沢田 優蘭, Sawada Uran; born October 24, 1990) is a Japanese para-athlete competing mainly in category F12 long jump and 100 metres events. She holds the Japanese record in both.

== Early life and education ==
Her parents had noticed that Sawada had poor eyesight since she was six years old, but her eyesight deteriorated rapidly after she entered junior high school, and it was discovered that she had retinitis pigmentosa. After graduating from junior high school, she went on to Tokyo Metropolitan Bunkyo School for the Blind, where she began training in athletics after participating in the Tokyo qualifying round for the National Sports Championships for the Disabled as part of her physical education classes.

== Sporting career ==
In 2008, Sawada participated in the 2008 Summer Paralympics at the age of 17, the youngest member of the team. Although she was eliminated in the qualifying round for the 100 metres, she placed ninth in the long jump with a record of 4.93 meters, improving her personal best by about 30 centimeters. After graduating from Rikkyo University, she left athletics for a while and got a job at a beverage manufacturer. However, she resumed training after that, and again set the Japanese record at the 2017 Japan Para Athletics Championships (5.03 meters). At the 2018 Beijing Grand Prix, she won the 100m and also broke the Japanese record in the long jump with a jump of 5.70 metres.

In 2021, at the age of 30, Sawada competed in the delayed 2020 Summer Paralympics in Tokyo. She lost in the semifinals of the 100m (T12), but placed 5th in the long jump (T12) with a record of 5.15 meters. In addition, she participated in the new Paralympic event, the Universal Relay, with Kengo Oshima, Yuki Takamatsu, and Tomoki Suzuki, and served as the first runner with guide runner Ryuhei Shiokawa. In the final on September 3, Japan finished 4th in a time of 47.98 seconds, but China, which finished 2nd, was disqualified, so she was promoted to 3rd place and won the bronze medal.

Sawada is ranked 1st in the world in the long jump (T12) and 6th in the world in the 100m (T12) (as of the end of 2018).

On January 31, 2022, Sawada left Mash Holdings Co., Ltd., where she had been affiliated since June 1, 2017, and joined Entry Co., Ltd. on February 1, 2022.

She won bronze medals in the women's long jump (T12) at the 2023 and 2024 World Para Athletics Championships.
