= Yuliia Shuliar =

Ukrainian Paralympic athlete (born 1997)

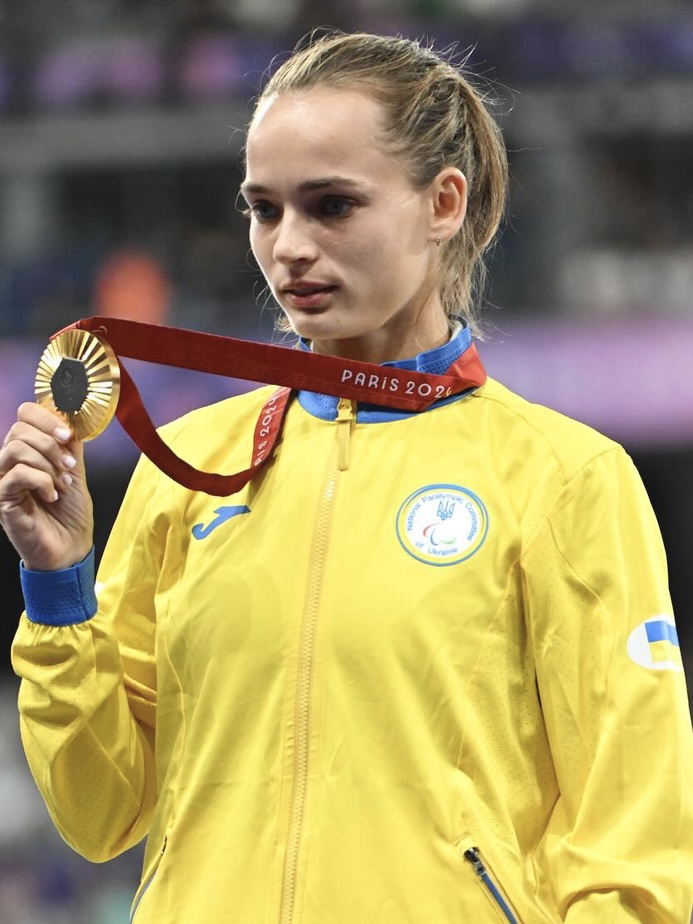
- Shuliar at the 2024 Summer Paralympics

Personal information
- Nationality: Ukrainian
- Born: 12 August 1997 (age 28) Zhytomyr, Ukraine

Sport
- Sport: Paralympic athletics
- Disability class: T20
- Event: 400 metres
Medal record
Women's para athletics
Representing Ukraine
Paralympic Games
Gold medal – first place	2024 Paris	400 m T20
Silver medal – second place	2020 Tokyo	400 m T20
World Championships
Silver medal – second place	2019 Dubai	400 m T20
Silver medal – second place	2023 Paris	400 m T20
Bronze medal – third place	2025 New Delhi	400 m T20
European Championships
Gold medal – first place	2021 Bydgoszcz	400 m T20
Silver medal – second place	2018 Berlin	400 m T20

Yuliia Shuliar (born 12 August 1997) is a Ukrainian Paralympic athlete who competes in T20 category 400 metres races. She represented Ukraine at the 2020 and 2024 Summer Paralympics.

== Career ==
Shuliar represented Ukraine at the 2020 Summer Paralympics and won a silver medal in the 400 metres T20 event. She again competed at the 2024 Summer Paralympics and won a gold medal in the 400 metres T20 event.
