= Nathan Maguire =

British wheelchair racer (born 1997)

Personal information
- Born: 27 July 1997 (age 29) Salford, England
- Education: Liverpool John Moores University
- Life partner: Hannah Cockroft

Sport
- Sport: Wheelchair racing
- Disability class: T54
- Club: Kirkby

Achievements and titles
- Paralympic finals: 2016, 2020, 2024
- World finals: 2017, 2023
- Regional finals: 2016, 2018, 2021
- National finals: 2020, 2021
- Commonwealth finals: 2018, 2022, 2026
Medal record
Representing Great Britain
World Championships
Bronze medal – third place	2024 Kobe	800 m T54
Bronze medal – third place	2025 New Delhi	1500 m T54
European Championships
Gold medal – first place	2018 Berlin	Relay
Bronze medal – third place	2018 Berlin	100 m T54
Bronze medal – third place	2018 Berlin	200 m T54
Bronze medal – third place	2018 Berlin	800 m T54
Silver medal – second place	2021 Bydgoszcz	Universal 4 × 100 m relay
Bronze medal – third place	2021 Bydgoszcz	400 m T54
Bronze medal – third place	2021 Bydgoszcz	800 m T54
British Athletics Championships
Silver medal – second place	2020 Manchester	400 m mixed
Gold medal – first place	2021 Manchester	400 m mixed
Gold medal – first place	2022 Manchester	400 m mixed
Paralympic Games
Silver medal – second place	2020 Tokyo	Mixed 4 × 100 m relay
Representing England
Commonwealth Games
Gold medal – first place	2022 Birmingham	1500 m T54
Gold medal – first place	2026 Glasgow	1500 m T54

Nathan Maguire (born 27 July 1997) is a British wheelchair racer. He won multiple medals at both the 2018 and 2021 World Para Athletics European Championships, and also won the 400 metres mixed class race at multiple British Athletics Championships. Maguire competed in the 4 × 400 metres relay T53/T54 at the 2016 Summer Paralympics, and competed in the 400 metres T54, 800 metres T54 and mixed 4 × 100 metres relay events at the delayed 2020 Summer Paralympics. He was part of the British team that won a silver medal in the 2020 Paralympic mixed 4 × 100 metres relay. He also competed for England at the 2018 Commonwealth Games, and won the 1500 metres T54 event at the 2022 Commonwealth Games.

== Personal life ==
Maguire was born in Salford, England, and has also lived in Chester. As of 2022, Maguire lived in Elton, Cheshire. At the age of eight, Maguire became paralysed overnight, and was diagnosed with transverse myelitis.

He studied at Helsby High School, and later at Liverpool John Moores University. Maguire is in a relationship with fellow athlete Hannah Cockroft. During the COVID-19 pandemic, Maguire had to self-isolate at home for 12 weeks; Maguire and Cockroft built a gym in their garage for training. Later in the year, the pair appeared together on a celebrity special of the BBC television programme The Hit List.

== Career ==
At the age of eight, Maguire took up wheelchair basketball, where he was coached by Josie Cichockyj. Aged 15, he settled on wheelchair racing at Greenbank Sports Academy. He now trains at Kirkby Athletics Club.

Magurie won the under-17s 3 miles (4.8 km) mini-marathon events at the 2014 and 2015 London Marathons. In 2016, Maguire was part of the British 4 × 400 metres relay team that won the 2016 IPC Athletics European Championships non-medal event.

Maguire was part of the British 4 × 400 metres relay T53/T54 team that finished second in their heat at the 2016 Summer Paralympics. At the 2017 World Para Athletics Championships, he came sixth in the 200 metres T54 event, and was eliminated in the heats of the 400 metres T54 event. He won two silver medals and one bronze medal at the 2017 World Para Athletics Junior Championships. He finished fourth in the men's 1500 metres T54 event at the 2018 Commonwealth Games. That year, he also won one gold and three bronze medals at the 2018 World Para Athletics European Championships. He won gold in the relay event, and bronze medals in the individual 100m, 200m, and 800m T54 events.

In 2019, Maguire was critical of funding cuts for British parasports, and the lack of money in parasports compared to able-bodied sports. That year, he was nominated for the Spinal Injuries Association's Young Person of the Year Award. In March 2020, he was supportive of the decision to postpone the 2020 Summer Paralympics due to the COVID-19 pandemic. Later in the year, he competed at the 2020 British Athletics Championships, finishing second in the 400 metres mixed class event.

Maguire won the 400 metres mixed class event at the 2021 British Athletics Championships. Later in the year, he came third in the 400 metres T54 event at the 2021 World Para Athletics European Championships, narrowly beating fellow Briton Danny Sidbury. He also came third in the 800 metres T54 event, and was part of the British team that came second in the universal 4 × 100 metres relay.

In July 2021, Maguire was announced in the British team for the delayed 2020 Summer Paralympics. He competed in the 400 metres T54, 800 metres T54 and mixed 4 × 100 metres relay events. In the 400 metres T54, Maguire came fourth in his heat, and qualified for the final, where he finished sixth. In the 800 metres T54 event, he came fifth in his heat, and did not qualify for the final. In the mixed 4 × 100 metres relay, Great Britain came second in their heat, and came second in the final.

In June 2022, Maguire won the 400 metres wheelchair race at the 2022 British Athletics Championships. Later in the year, he won the 1500 metres T54 event at the 2022 Commonwealth Games.

At the 2023 World Para Athletics Championships, he placed 5th and 7th in the 800 and 1500 metres respectively. He also placed 5th in the 400 metres.

At the 2024 World Championships, he won bronze in the 800 metres, and 5th and 6th in the 1500 metres and 400 metres respectively.

Maguire qualified to represent Great Britain at the 2024 Summer Paralympics, in the 400, 800 and 1500 metres. He placed 4th in both the 400 and 800 metres, and 5th in the 1500 metres.

Since the Paralympics, Maguire has called for more international competitions, so that para athletics is given a bigger spotlight.
