= 2021 World Para Athletics European Championships – Men's 800 metres =

The men's 800 metres events were held at the 2021 World Para Athletics European Championships in Bydgoszcz, Poland.

== Medalists ==
Event	Gold		Silver		Bronze	
T53	Pierre Fairbank (FRA)	1:45.59 SB	Vitalii Gritsenko (RUS)	1:45.73	Nicolas Brignone (FRA)	1:46.20 SB
T54	Marcel Hug (SUI)	1:37.20 CR	Julien Casoli (FRA)	1:37.27	Nathan Maguire (GBR)	1:37.60 SB
WR world record | ER European record | CR championship record | NR national record | WL world leading | EL European leading | PB personal best | SB seasonal best

== See also ==
- List of IPC world records in athletics
