= Athletics at the 2022 Commonwealth Games – Men's 1500 metres (T54) =

Men's 1500 metres (T54) at the 2022 Commonwealth Games
- Venue: Alexander Stadium
- Dates: 5 August
- Competitors: 7 from 4 nations
- Winning time: 3:11.83

Medalists
gold medal	Nathan Maguire	England
silver medal	Daniel Sidbury	England
bronze medal	Samuel Carter	Australia

The men's 1500 metres (T54) at the 2022 Commonwealth Games, as part of the athletics programme, took place in the Alexander Stadium on 5 August 2022.

== Records ==
Prior to this competition, the existing world and Games records were as follows:

Records T54
World record	Marcel Hug (SUI)	2:51.84	Nottwil, Switzerland	28 May 2022
Games record	Richard Chiassaro (ENG)	3:05.76	Gold Coast, Australia	9 April 2018

== Schedule ==
The schedule was as follows:

Date	Time	Round
Friday 5 August 2022	19:55	Final

All times are British Summer Time (UTC+1)

== Results ==
=== Final ===
The medals were determined in the final.

Rank	Name	Sport class	Result	Notes
1st place, gold medalist(s)	Nathan Maguire (ENG)	T54	3:11.83	
2nd place, silver medalist(s)	Daniel Sidbury (ENG)	T54	3:12.15	
3rd place, bronze medalist(s)	Samuel Carter (AUS)	T54	3:12.82	
4	Jake Lappin (AUS)	T54	3:17.87	
5	Josh Cassidy (CAN)	T54	3:25.20	
6	Alex Dupont (CAN)	T54	3:29.80	
7	Cedric Ravet (MRI)	T54	3:45.30	
