= Mikail Al =

Turkish Paralympic athlete (born 2003)

Personal information
- Born: 2 August 2003 (age 22) Şırnak, Turkey

Sport
- Country: Turkey
- Sport: Paralympic athletics
- Disability class: T13
- Event(s): 1500 m, 5000 m
- Club: Istanbul BB SK

Achievements and titles
- Personal best: 1500 m: 4:01.19 (2024)
Medal record
Men's Track and field
Representing Turkey
World Grand Prix
Gold medal – first place	2024 Jesolo	1500 m T13
Gold medal – first place	2024 Jesolo	5000 m T13

Mikail Al (born 2 August 2003) is a Turkish Paralympian athlete. He is competing in the men's 1500 m middle and 5000 m long-distance running events of T13 disability class.

== Sport career ==
Visually impaired middle and long-distance runner Mikail Al was a member of Diyarbakır GESK, where he was coached by the visually impaired national athlete Mehmet Nesim Öner. He then transferred to Istanbul BB SK.

He competed in the 1500 m and 5000 m of the T13 class events at the 2023 World Para Athletics Championships in Paris, France. In the 1500 m, he ranked fourth with his personal best time of 4:01.50. With this result, he secured a quota for participation at the 2024 Paris Paralimpics. He could not finish the 5000 m run.

At the Italian Open 2024 Grand Prix in Jesolo, he captured the gold medal in the 1500 m T13 event improving his personal best time to 4:01.19, and won another gold medal in the 5000 m T13 event with 15:28.57.

== Personal life ==
Mikail Al was born in Şırnak, southeastern Turkey on 2 August 2003.
