= Yeny Vargas =

Peruvian Paralympic athlete

Personal information
- National team: Peru
- Born: Apurímac Region, Peru

Sport
- Country: Peru
- Sport: Athletics
- Disability: Arm amputation
- Disability class: T47
- Coached by: Fredy Medina
- Updated on 15 November 2017

Yeny Vargas is a Peruvian athlete who competed for her nation at the 2016 Summer Paralympics, having only taken up the sport three years prior.

== Career ==
After being electrocuted at the age of five, part of one of Yeny Vargas' arms was amputated. She took up athletics after being invited to compete at an event run by her school in 2013. She came second in her event, but did not take up athletics fully until 2014 under coach Fredy Medina, while wanting to compete at a Paralympic Games.

She was selected for the Peruvian team at the 2016 Summer Paralympics in Rio de Janeiro, Brazil, in the women's 400 and 200 meters T47. She was the only woman included in the team. Prior to the Games, she said "I can imagine myself stepping on the podium – maybe not at these Games, because I still have a lot to work on, but later in my career for sure."

In the 200 metres, she finished in ninth position overall from the heats with a time of 31.49 seconds, failing to qualify for the final. She finished in the 400 metres as the eighth fastest qualifier with a time of 1 minute and 9.23 seconds, allowing where she finished seventh in 1 minute and 9.63 seconds.
