= Kengo Oshima =

Japanese para athlete (born 2000)

Personal information
- Nationality: Japanese
- Born: 1 January 2000 (age 26)

Sport
- Sport: Para athletics
- Disability class: T64
- Events: 100 metres, 200 metres
Medal record
Men's para athletics
Representing Japan
Paralympic Games
Bronze medal – third place	2020 Tokyo	Mixed 4 × 100 m relay
World Championships
Silver medal – second place	2024 Kobe	200 m T64
Asian Para Games
Gold medal – first place	2022 Hangzhou	100 m T64
Gold medal – first place	2026 Aichi–Nagoya	200 m T64
Silver medal – second place	2022 Hangzhou	200 m T64

Kengo Oshima (大島健吾, Oshima Kengo; born 1 January 2000) is a Japanese T64 Paralympic sprint runner. He represented Japan at the 2020 and 2024 Summer Paralympics.

== Career ==
Oshima represented Japan at the 2020 Summer Paralympics and won a bronze medal in the mixed 4 × 100 metres relay.

In May 2024, he competed at the 2024 World Para Athletics Championships and won a silver medal in the 200 metres T64 event. In September 2024, he again represented Japan at the 2024 Summer Paralympics.

In May 2026, he competed at the Japan Para Athletics Championships and won a gold medal in the 200 metres T64 event with a new Asian record time of 22.76 seconds. In October 2026, he competed at the 2026 Asian Para Games and won a gold medal in the 200 metres T64 event with an Asian Games record time of 23.24 seconds.

== Personal life ==
Oshima was born with a congenital limb deficiency missing his left foot and ankle.
