= Lisbeli Vera Andrade =

Venezuelan Paralympic athlete

Personal information
- Full name: Lisbeli Marina Vera Andrade
- Born: 15 September 2001 (age 24) Mérida, Venezuela
- Height: 1.60 m (5 ft 3 in)

Sport
- Country: Venezuela
- Sport: Paralympic athletics
- Disability class: T47
- Event(s): 100 metres 200 metres 400 metres
Medal record
Paralympic athletics
Representing Venezuela
Summer Paralympics
Gold medal – first place	2020 Tokyo	100m T47
Gold medal – first place	2020 Tokyo	200m T47
Silver medal – second place	2020 Tokyo	400m T47
Silver medal – second place	2024 Paris	400m T47
World Championships
Gold medal – first place	2024 Kobe	200m T47
Silver medal – second place	2024 Kobe	400m T47
Bronze medal – third place	2019 Dubai	200m T47
Bronze medal – third place	2019 Dubai	400m T47
Parapan American Games
Gold medal – first place	2019 Lima	400m T47
Gold medal – first place	2023 Santiago	200m T47
Silver medal – second place	2019 Lima	100m T47
Silver medal – second place	2019 Lima	200m T47

Lisbeli Marina Vera Andrade (born 15 September 2001) is a Venezuelan Paralympic athlete who competes in sprinting events at international elite events. She is a Parapan American Games champion and a World Para Athletics Championships gold medalist.

== Personal life ==
Vera Andrade was born without the lower part of her left arm.
