= Justyna Franieczek =

Polish paralympic athlete

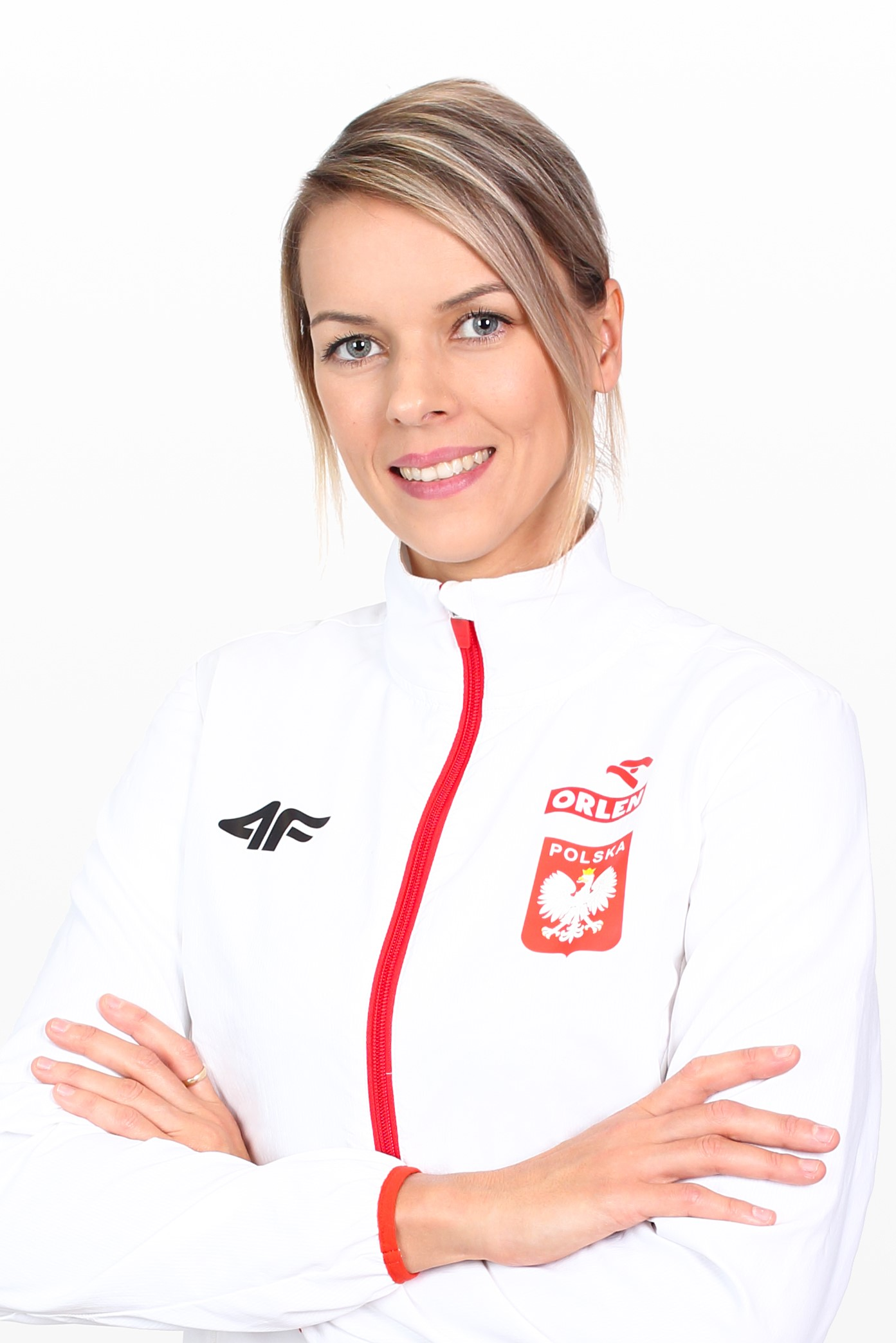
- Franieczek in 2022

Personal information
- Nationality: Poland
- Born: 6 April 1989 (age 37) Wrocław, Poland

Sport
- Country: Poland
- Sport: Athletics
- Event: T20 sprint
- Club: BKS Bydgoszcz
- Coached by: Iwona Baumgart, dr Kamil Całek
Medal record
Track and field
Representing Poland
European Championships
Bronze medal – third place	2021 Bydgoszcz	400m T20

Justyna Franieczek (born 6 April 1989 in Wrocław) is a Polish paralympic athlete. In 2021, she competed at the 2020 Summer Paralympics, in 400m T20 finishing fifth. Finalist of the World Championships in Dubai in 2019, bronze medalist of the European Championships, Polish champion, member of the national team. She comes in the T20 category. In 2021, she won the title of world champion in the 400 m race and in the relay race. Finalist of the Tokyo Paralympic Games. On October 13, 2021, the Governor of Wielkopolska, Michał Zieliński, appointed Justyna Franieczek to the Sports Council of the Wielkopolska Province Governor.

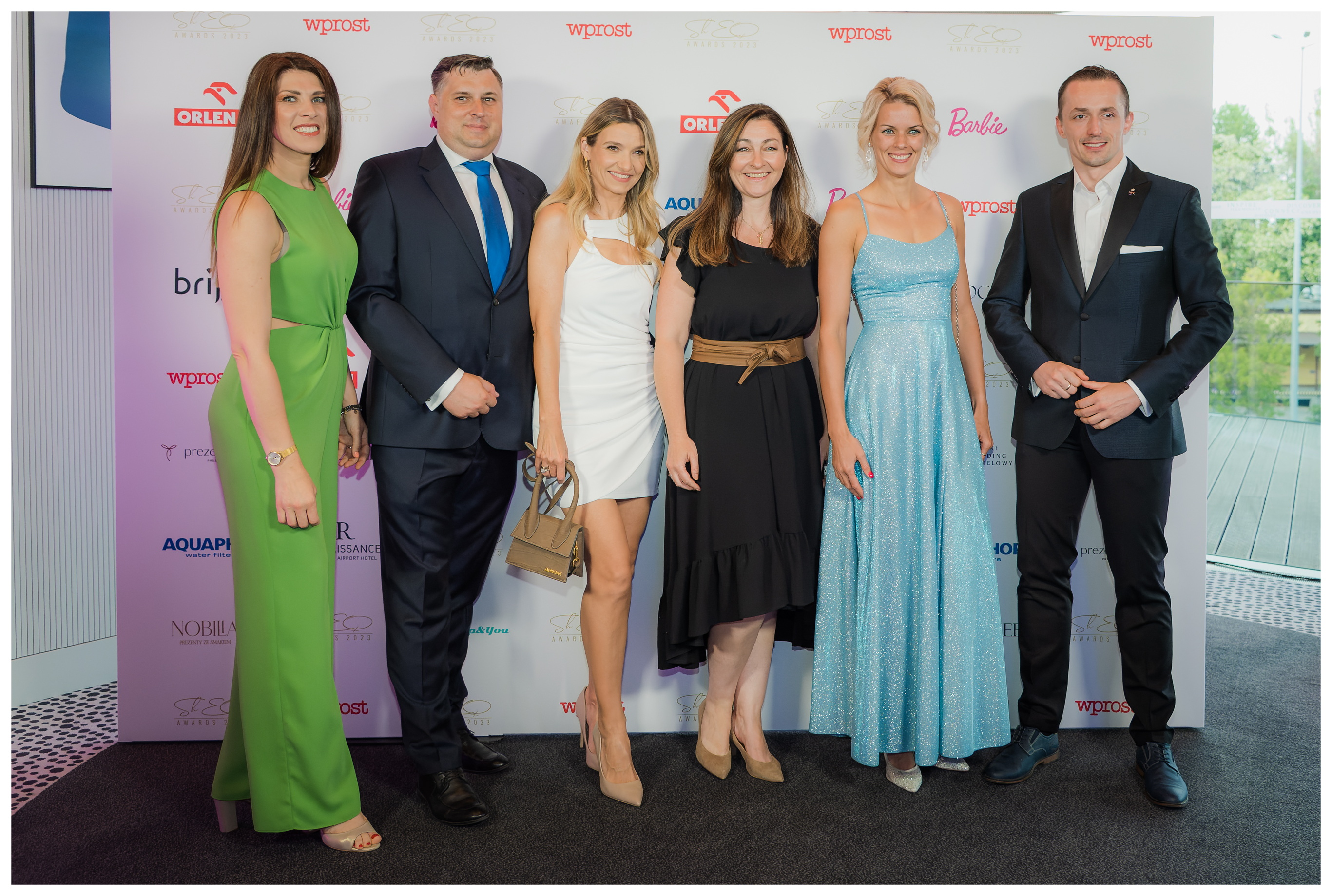
Woman of the Year 2023 Breaking Barriers SHEO 2023 of WPROST Weekly

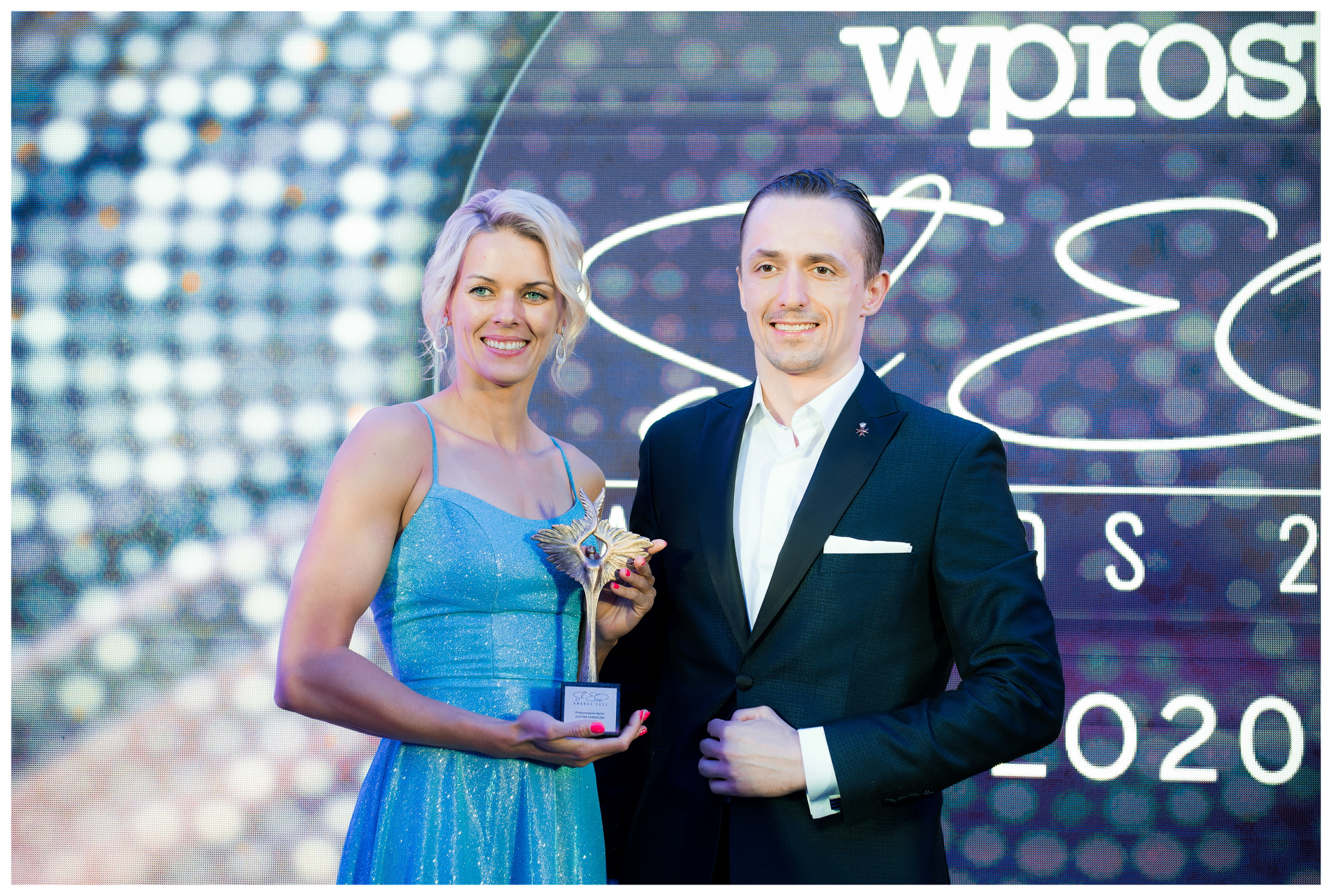
dr Kamil Całek

== Personal life ==
As a junior, she won medals of the Polish championship together with non-disabled people. Later, however, she was diagnosed with cancer, which caused her to quit the sport. She returned after a successful fight with the disease. After some time, she had a serious car accident, suffering a 30% injury, and a pregnancy loss as a result. Her recovery and sport took eight years.

== Career ==
In 2019, she performed at the World Championships in Dubai, finishing seventh in the 400 meter T20 category. In 2020, she won a silver medal in the Polish Disabled Swimming Championships, representing the Start Skrzatusz club. In 2021, she won a bronze medal in the Polish Cross-country Ski Championship for Disabled People and two gold medals at the 49th Polish Paralympic Athletics Championships and XXVIII Polish Athletics Championships, whereas in the European Championship she won a bronze medal. In the final of the Tokyo Paralympics, she was fifth.

=== International competitions ===
Representing Poland
Year	Competition	Venue	Position	Event	Notes
2021	Kamila Skolimowska Memorial	Chorzów, Poland	1st	100 meters run (T20)	0:13,20
2021	Paralympic Games	Tokyo, Japan	5th	400 meters run (T20)	0:59,14
2021	Virtus World Athletics Championships	Bydgoszcz, Poland	1st	400 meters run (T20)	0:59,66
2021	Virtus World Athletics Championships	Bydgoszcz, Poland	1st	4x100 meter relay (T20)	0:52,78
2021	Virtus World Athletics Championships	Bydgoszcz, Poland	3rd	100 meter run (T20)	0:13,38
2021	Virtus World Athletics Championships	Bydgoszcz, Poland	3rd	200 meter run (T20)	0:27,08
2021	European Championships	Bydgoszcz, Poland	3rd	400 meter run (T20)	0:59,09
2021	XXVIII Polish Athletics Championships - "Sprawni-Razem"	Sępólno Krajeńskie, Poland	1st	400 meter run (T20)	1:01,82
2021	49th Paralecathletic Championships of Poland	Bydgoszcz, Poland	1st	400 meter run (T20)	1:00,64
2021	Polish Cross-Country Skiing Championship for Disabled People	Ptaszkowa, Poland	3rd	Classic style 1,300 meters run	6:44,20
2020	Polish swimming Championship for Disabled People	Gorzów Wielkopolski, Poland	2nd	Freestyle, 50 meters	0:53,93
2020	XXVII Polish Athletics Championships - "Sprawni-Razem"	Bydgoszcz, Poland	1st	400 meter run (T20)	1:02,03
2020	XXVII Polish Athletics Championships - "Sprawni-Razem"	Bydgoszcz, Poland	1st	200 meter run (T20)	0:27,78
2020	Kamila Skolimowska Memorial	Chorzów, Poland	3rd	100 meter run (T20)	0:13,49
2020	48th Paralecathletic Championships of Poland	Kraków, Poland	1st	400 meter run (T20)	1:01,04
2019	World Championship	Dubai, United Arab Emirates	7th	400 meter run (T20)	1:01,15
2019	Paralecathletic Championships of Poland	Bydgoszcz, Poland	1st	400 meter run (T20)	0:58,81
2019	World Para Athletics Grand Prix	Bydgoszcz, Poland	1st	400 meter run (T20)	0:58,81
2019	Polish Athletics Championships	Ciechanów, Poland	1st	400 meter run (T20)	0:59,14
2019	Kamila Skolimowska Memorial	Chorzów, Poland	3rd	100 meter run (T20)	0:13,48

== Bibliography ==
- Kamil Całek, Mariusz Siebert (2022). Koncepcja rozwojowa osób niepełnosprawnych fizycznie na przykładzie Mistrzyni Świata w lekkoatletyce Justyny Franieczek [The development concept of people with physical disabilities on the example of Justyna Franieczek, the World Champion in track and field] (in Polish). Olsztyn: Cepheus. ISBN 9788366130524.
- Kamil Całek, Eryk Kowalczyk (2020). Justyna Franieczek. Sportowy wysiłek walki z trudnościami jako droga do samorealizacji w życiowym sukcesie [Justyna Franieczek. Sports effort to fight difficulties as a path to self-fulfillment in life success] (in Polish). Olsztyn, Piła: Cepheus. ISBN 9788366130678.
