= Noah Malone =

American Paralympic athlete

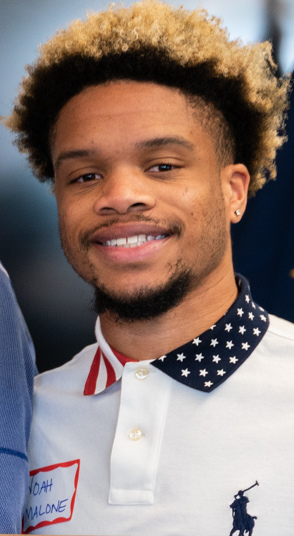
- Malone in 2021

Personal information
- Born: October 13, 2001 (age 24) Silver Spring, Maryland, U.S.
- Home town: Fishers, Indiana, U.S.
- Height: 5 ft 11 in (180 cm)
- Weight: 158 lb (72 kg)

Sport
- Country: United States
- Sport: Para-athletics Track and Field
- Disability: Visual Impairment (Leber's hereditary optic neuropathy)
- Disability class: T12
- University team: Indiana State University
- Coached by: Anthony Bertoli

Achievements and titles
- Paralympic finals: 10.55 Men's 100m T12 American Record Holder
Medal record
Paralympic Games
Gold medal – first place	2020 Tokyo	mixed 4×100 m relay
Gold medal – first place	2024 Paris	100 m T12
Silver medal – second place	2020 Tokyo	100 m T12
Silver medal – second place	2024 Paris	400 m T12
Bronze medal – third place	2024 Paris	mixed 4×100 m relay
World Championships
Gold medal – first place	2023 Paris	100 m T12
Silver medal – second place	2024 Kobe	100 m T12

Noah Malone (born October 13, 2001) is a Paralympic athlete who sprints for Team USA, competing in category T12. Noah attended Hamilton Southeastern High School and the Indiana School for the Blind and Visually Impaired where he set several school records and won a state championship in the 200m. He then attended Indiana State University.

== Achievements ==
- 2019: Gold medal (100m, 200m) and silver medal (400m) at the World Para Athletics Junior Championships in Nottwil, Switzerland.
- 2019: Gold medal (4 × 100 m relay) and silver medal (100m) at the Parapan American Games in Lima, Peru.
- 2021: Silver medal in the men's 100 metres T12 event at the 2020 Summer Paralympics in Tokyo, Japan.
- 2022: T12 world records in the 100m (10.34 s) and 200m (21.10 s) at the 2022 Missouri Valley Conference outdoor track & field championships in Des Moines, Iowa.; Para 100m title at Dubai Para Grand Prix.
- 2023: Para 100m title Prefontaine Classic.
- 2024: Gold medal in the men's 100 metres T12 event at the 2024 Summer Paralympics in Paris
