= Joeferson Marinho de Oliveira =

Brazilian paralympic athlete

Joeferson Marinho
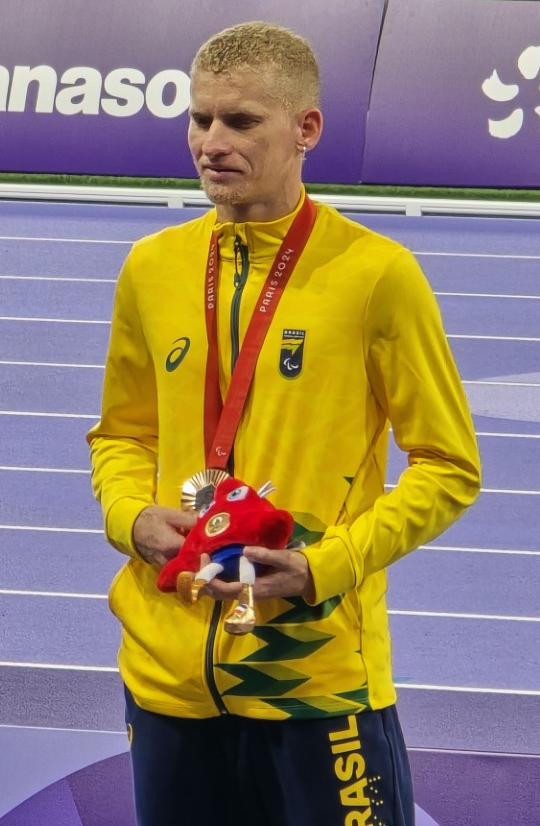
- Joeferson Marinho de Oliveira with his bronze medal (Paris 2024)

Personal information
- Full name: Joeferson Marinho de Oliveira
- Born: 7 January 1999 (age 27) João Pessoa, Brazil

Sport
- Country: Brazil
- Sport: Para-athletics
Medal record
Men's para-athletics
Representing Brazil
Paralympic Games
Silver medal – second place	2024 Paris	100 m T12
World Championships
Silver medal – second place	2019 Dubai	100 m T12

Joeferson Marinho de Oliveira (born 7 January 1999), known as Joeferson Marinho, is a Brazilian paralympic athlete. He competed at the 2024 Summer Paralympics, winning the silver medal in the men's 100 m T12 event. He originally won the bronze medal in the event.
