= Jardênia Félix =

Brazilian Paralympic athlete

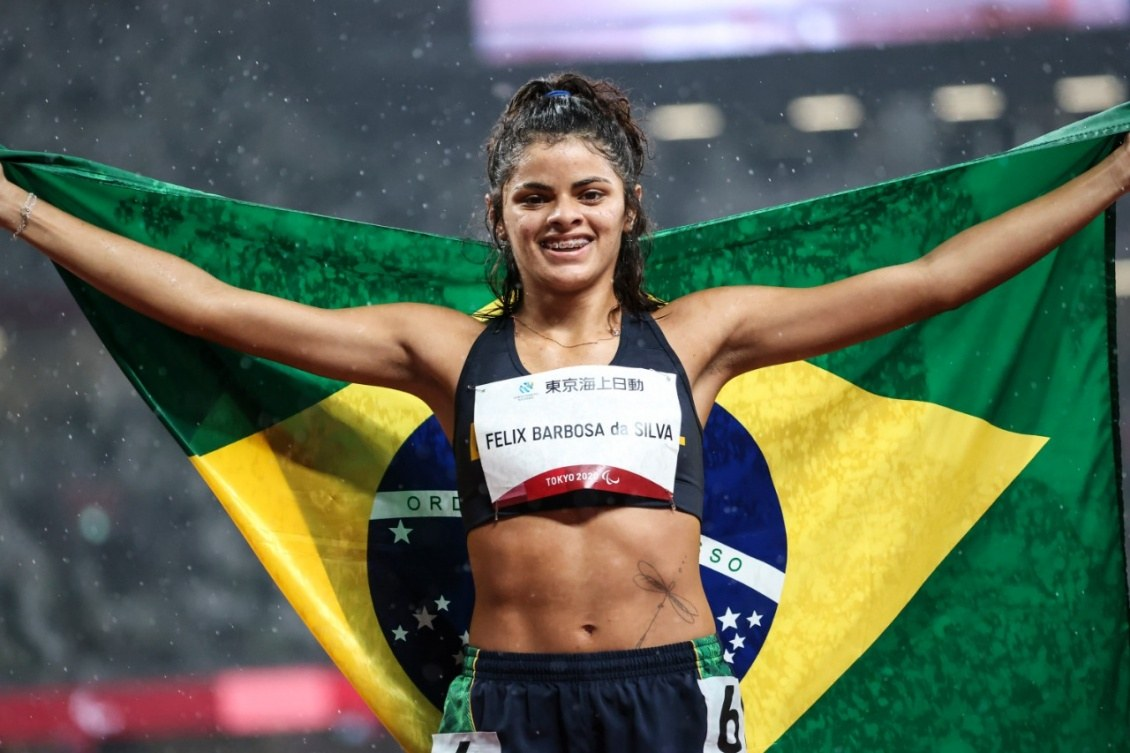
- Félix at the 2020 Summer Paralympics

Personal information
- Full name: Jardênia Félix Barbosa da Silva
- Born: 9 September 2003 (age 22) Natal, Rio Grande do Norte, Brazil

Sport
- Sport: Paralympic athletics
- Disability class: T20
- Events: 100 metres; 200 metres; 400 metres; Long jump
Medal record
Women's para athletics
Representing Brazil
Paralympic Games
Bronze medal – third place	2020 Tokyo	400 m
INAS Global Games
Bronze medal – third place	2019 Brisbane	100m
Bronze medal – third place	2019 Brisbane	200m
World Para Athletics Championships
Bronze medal – third place	2023 Paris	Long jump T20
World Para Athletics Junior Championships
Silver medal – second place	2019 Notwill	400 m

Jardênia Félix Barbosa da Silva (born 9 September 2003), commonly known as Jardênia Félix, is a Brazilian para-athlete who competes in T20 events. She has represented Brazil in several national and international events, such as the Summer Paralympics, the World Para Athletics Championships, and the World Para Athletics Grand Prix, among others.

== Early and personal life ==
Jardênia Félix Barbosa da Silva was born in Natal, Rio Grande do Norte on 9 September 2003. In 2016, she began competing in able-bodied athletics and the following year, she switched to para-athletics after her coach identified some signs of intellectual disability.

Félix is part of the LGBTQ+ community.

== Career ==
At the 2019 World Para Athletics Junior Championships, Félix won the silver medal at the 400m event. Two months later, at the 2019 INAS Global Games, she won a bronze medal in the 100m and 200m events. After these achievements, she rose to 3rd place in the world rankings in her category.

At the age of 17, Félix won a bronze medal at the 2020 Summer Paralympics in the 400 metres event, recording her best time of 57:43. She also competed in the long jump, finishing in fifth place with a then career-best time of 5.29 metres, breaking the Americas record in the process.

In June 2022, during the 2nd Phase of the National Athletics Circuit, at the Paralympic Training Centre, in São Paulo, Félix jumped 5.71 metres and set the best mark in the Americas in the long jump of the T20 class, surpassing her own record of 5.69 metres. In September of the same year, at the World Para Athletics Grand Prix, in Marrakesh, Morocco, she won the gold medal in the long jump. In the 400 metres, she took silver in a group event of the T13/20/37 classes.

In July 2023, at the World Para Athletics Championships in Paris, France, she won bronze in the long jump and, together with Zileide Cassiano da Silva who took silver, achieved a double on the podium, an unprecedented feat for the country.

In September 2024, Félix competed at the 2024 Summer Paralympics in Paris, France in the women's long jump T20 event.
