= Jule Ross =

German para athlete (born 2006)

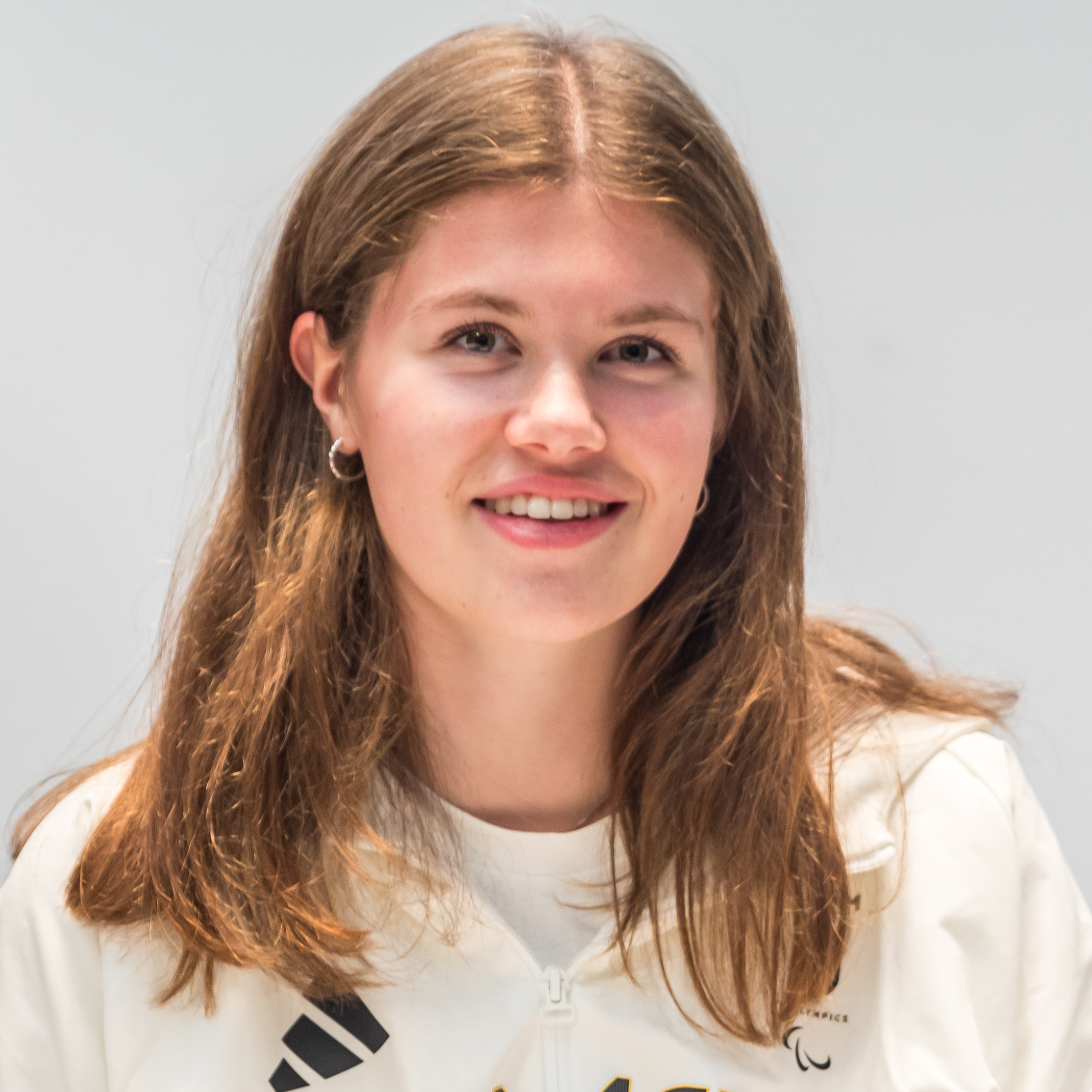
- Ross in 2024

Personal information
- Nationality: German
- Born: 15 June 2006 (age 20)

Sport
- Sport: Para-athletics
- Disability class: T47
- Event(s): sprints, long jump
Medal record
Women's para-athletics
Representing Germany
World Championships
Bronze medal – third place	2025 New Delhi	400 m T47

Jule Ross (born 15 June 2006) is a German para athlete who competes in T47 sprint events. She represented Germany at the 2024 Summer Paralympics.

== Career ==
Ross represented Germany at the 2024 Summer Paralympics. Her best finish was eighth place in the 400 metres T47 event. She competed at the 2025 World Para Athletics Championships and won a bronze medal in the 400 metres T47 event. She also competed in the 100 metres T47 event and finished in seventh place with a time of 12.56 seconds.
