= Alissa Jordaan =

Australian Paralympic athlete (born 2003)

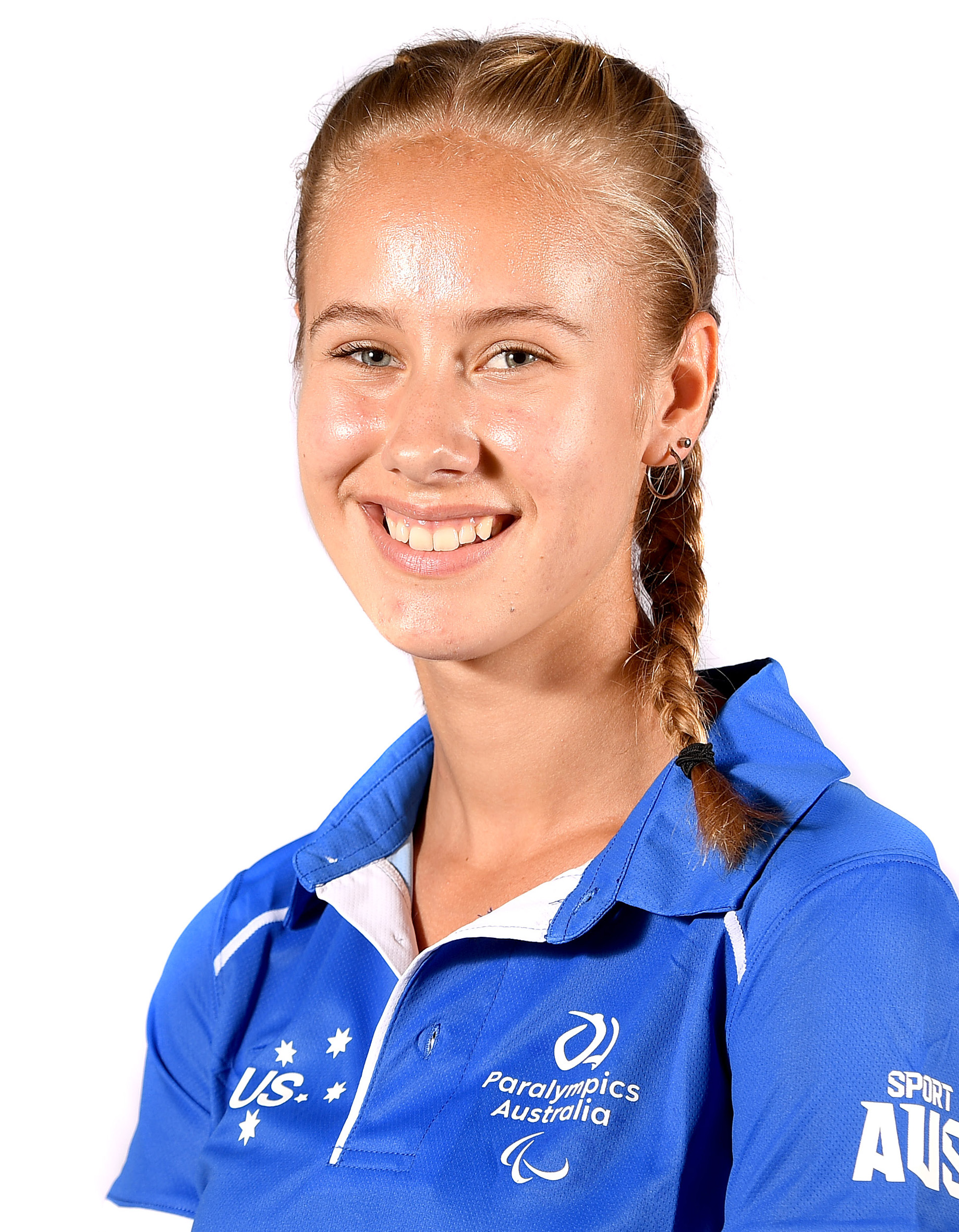
- Alissa Jordaan in 2019

Personal information
- Nationality: Australian
- Born: 30 June 2003 (age 23)

Sport
- Country: Australia
- Sport: Paralympic athletics

Alissa Jordaan (born 30 June 2003) is an Australian Paralympic athlete. She represented Australia at the 2020 Summer Paralympics.

== Athletics ==
She is classified as a T47 athlete. She was a member of Northern Suburbs Little Athletics Club in Sydney.

At the 2017 World Junior Para-Athletics World Championships in Nottwil, Switzerland, she won the gold medal in Long Jump U18 T42-47, and silver medals in the 100m and 200m (U18 T42-47).

In November 2020, Jordaan became the first Australian female T46/47 sprinter to run the 400m in under 60 seconds, clocking a time of 59.69" at the Australian Institute of Sport.

In 2019, she was one of five Australian Para-athletes from New South Wales to be the first recipients of the Kurt Fearnley Scholarship.

Jordaan competed in the 2020 Tokyo Paralympics. She qualified for the final of the 400m T47 where she came 7th. She came 10th in her 100m T47 heat and did not advance to the final.

In 2021, she is coached in Canberra by Sebastian Kuzminski.
