= Breanna Clark =

American Paralympic athlete

Personal information
- Born: November 4, 1994 (age 31) Los Angeles, California, U.S.
- Home town: Los Angeles, California, U.S.
- Height: 5 ft 10 in (178 cm)
- Weight: 163 lb (74 kg)

Sport
- Country: United States
- Sport: Paralympic athletics
- Disability: Autism
- Disability class: T20
- Club: Dorsey High School; Pasadena City College
Medal record
Women's para athletics
Representing United States
Paralympic Games
Gold medal – first place	2016 Rio de Janeiro	400 m T20
Gold medal – first place	2020 Tokyo	400 m T20
World Championships
Gold medal – first place	2017 London	400 m T20
Gold medal – first place	2023 Paris	400 m T20
Parapan American Games
Gold medal – first place	2019 Lima	400 m T20

Breanna Clark (born November 4, 1994) is an American Paralympic athlete who has competed in T20 category races. She was diagnosed with autism at age four.

== Career ==
Clark ran on the track teams at Susan Miller Dorsey High School and Pasadena City College.

== Personal life ==
She has a twin brother named Rashard and first-cousin named Duane who also both ran track. Their mother, Rosalyn Clark, won a silver medal in the 1976 Summer Olympics in the women's 4 x 400 metres relay. Breanna is a world, Parapan American and Paralympic champion in the races that she competes in.
