= Dimitri Pavadé =

French Paralympic athlete

Personal information
- Nationality: French
- Born: 14 August 1989 (age 36)

Sport
- Sport: Paralympic athletics
- Disability class: T64
- Event: long jump
- Club: Athle 632 Tournefeuille
- Coached by: Remi Magro
Medal record
Men's para-athletics
Representing France
Paralympic Games
Silver medal – second place	2020 Tokyo	long jump T64
World Championships
Silver medal – second place	2019 Dubai	long jump T64
European Championships
Silver medal – second place	2021 Bydgoszcz	long jump T64
Bronze medal – third place	2021 Bydgoszcz	universal 4×100 m relay

Dimitri Pavadé (born 14 August 1989) is a French para-athlete who specializes in long jump. Born and raised on the island of Réunion, he represented France at the 2020 and 2024 Paralympics.

== Career ==
Pavadé represented France in the men's long jump T64 event at the 2020 Paralympics and won a silver medal. He also represented France in the same event at the 2024 Paralympics, coming in fourth.

== Personal life ==
Pavadé's right leg was amputated at the age of eighteen after a work accident. He was working on the docks in Réunion when a forklift truck, weighing 18 tonnes, rolled over his leg.

During the 2024 Paralympics, after competing he came out as gay publicly.
