= Maria Clara Augusto =

Brazilian Paralympic athlete (born 2004)

Personal information
- Full name: Maria Clara Augusto da Silva
- Born: 5 June 2004 (age 22) São Paulo do Potengi, Rio Grande do Norte, Brazil

Sport
- Country: Brazil
- Sport: Para-athletics
- Disability class: T47
Medal record
Women's para-athletics
Representing Brazil
Paralympic Games
Bronze medal – third place	2024 Paris	400 m T47
World Championships
Gold medal – first place	2025 New Delhi	400 m T47
Silver medal – second place	2025 New Delhi	100 m T47
Silver medal – second place	2025 New Delhi	200 m T47
Bronze medal – third place	2023 Paris	400 m T47
Parapan American Games
Silver medal – second place	2023 Santiago	400 m T47

Maria Clara Augusto da Silva (born 5 June 2004) is a Brazilian para-athlete. She represented Brazil at the 2024 Summer Paralympics.

== Career ==
Augusto represented Brazil at the 2024 Summer Paralympics and won a bronze medal in the 400 metres T47 event.
