= Carina Paim =

Portuguese Paralympic athlete

Personal information
- Born: 3 May 1999 (age 27) Portimão, Portugal
- Height: 1.58 m (5 ft 2 in)

Sport
- Country: Portugal
- Sport: Paralympic athletics
- Disability class: T20
- Event: 400 metres
- Coached by: Anabela Leite
Medal record
Paralympic athletics
Representing Portugal
World Championships
Bronze medal – third place	2019 Dubai	400 m T20
Bronze medal – third place	2023 Paris	400 m T20
European Championships
Gold medal – first place	2018 Berlin	400 m T20
INAS European Indoor Championships
Gold medal – first place	2019 Istanbul	200 m
Gold medal – first place	2019 Istanbul	400 m

Carina Paim (born 3 May 1999) is a Portuguese Paralympic athlete who competes in international elite events. She specialises in the 400 metres, she is a World bronze medalist and a European champion. She took up track and field after being inspired by watching Allyson Felix on the television.
