= Nick Mayhugh =

American Paralympic sprinter (born 1996)

Personal information
- Full name: Nicholas Mayhugh
- Born: February 27, 1996 (age 30) Fairfax, Virginia, U.S.

Sport
- Sport: Paralympic athletics
- Disability: Cerebral palsy
- Disability class: T37/T38
- Event: Sprints
- Coached by: Thomas Mayhugh
Medal record
Representing the United States
Paralympic athletics
Paralympic Games
Gold medal – first place	2020 Tokyo	100 m T37
Gold medal – first place	2020 Tokyo	200 m T37
Gold medal – first place	2020 Tokyo	mixed 4×100 m relay
Silver medal – second place	2020 Tokyo	400 m T37
World Championships
Bronze medal – third place	2023 Paris	100 m T38
Paralympic association football
Parapan American Games
Bronze medal – third place	2019 Lima	7-a side football

Nicholas "Nick" Mayhugh (born February 27, 1996) is an American T37 and T38 Paralympic sprint runner and soccer player. He represented the United States at the 2020 Summer Paralympics.

== Soccer ==
Mayhugh played soccer at Radford University from 2015 to 2018. He also played for the United States men's Paralympic soccer team where he helped team USA win a bronze medal at the 2019 Parapan American Games in the 7-a-side football, their first ever medal in the event at the Parapan American Games. He finished second in the tournament with eight goals in six games. He was subsequently named U.S. Soccer Player of the Year with a Disability in 2019.

== Para-athletics ==
Mayhugh represented the United States in the men's 100 metres T37 event at the 2020 Summer Paralympics where he set a world record with a time of 10.95 and won a gold medal. He competed in the men's 400 metres T37 event and won a silver medal. He also competed in the mixed 4 × 100 metres relay event and won a gold medal.
