= Roman Tarasov =

Russian Paralympic athlete

Personal information
- Born: 19 December 1992 (age 33) Sayansk, Russia

Sport
- Country: Russia
- Sport: Para-athletics
Medal record
Paralympic Games
Bronze medal – third place	2020 Tokyo	100 m T12

Roman Tarasov (born 19 December 1992) is a Russian Paralympic athlete. He won the bronze medal in the men's 100 metres T12 event at the 2020 Summer Paralympics held in Tokyo, Japan. He competed at the Summer Paralympics under the flag of the Russian Paralympic Committee.
