= Tereza Jakschová =

Czech Paralympic athlete (born 1995)

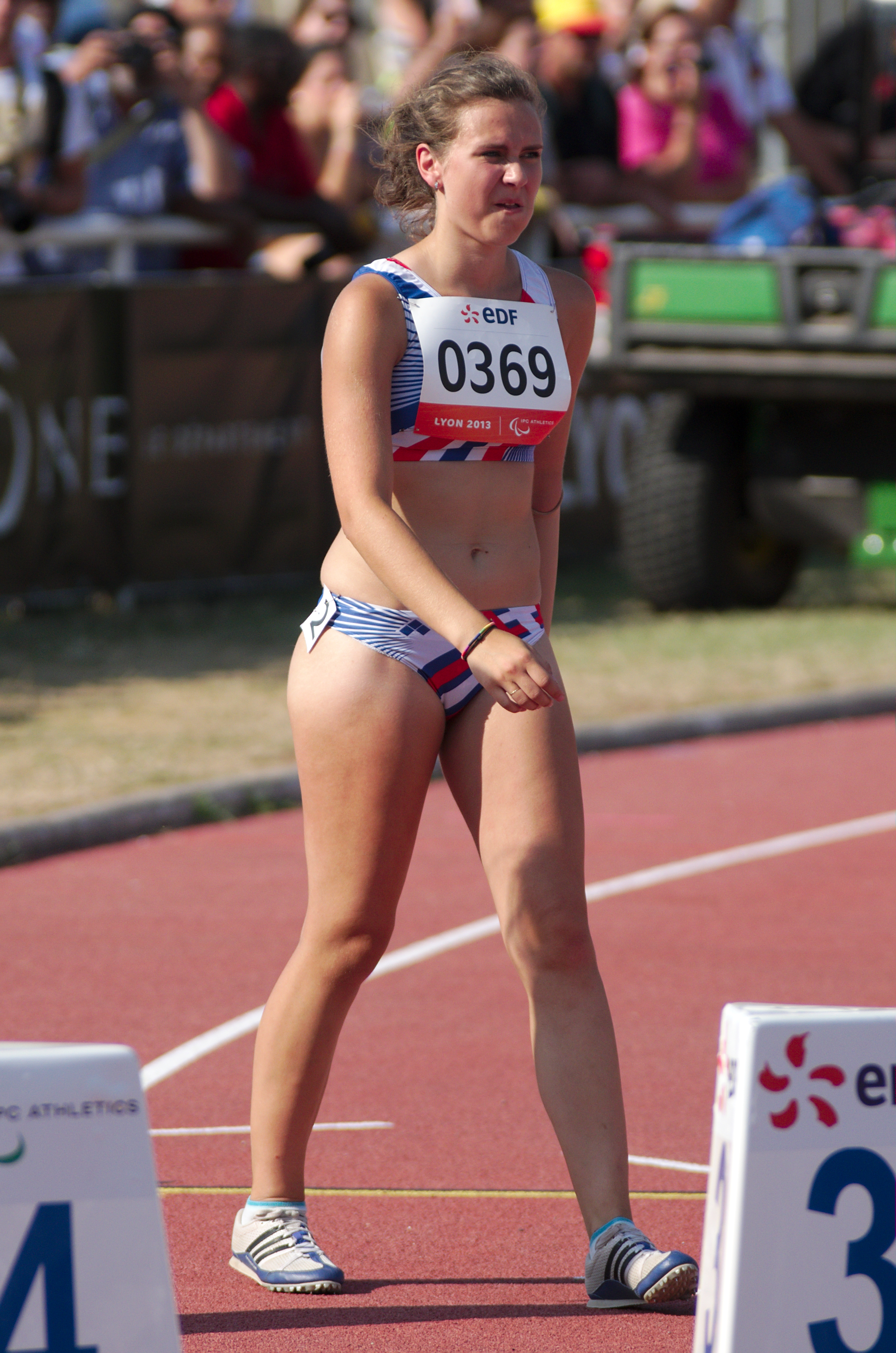
- Jakschová at 2013 IPC Athletics World Championships

Personal information
- Born: 1 September 1995 (age 31) Prague, Czech Republic
- Website: Tereza Jakschová on Instagram

Sport
- Country: Czech Republic
- Sport: Paralympic athletics
- Disability class: T47
- Club: ASK Slavia Praha
Medal record
Paralympic athletics
Representing Czech Republic
World Championships
Silver medal – second place	2018 Berlin	100m T47
Bronze medal – third place	2018 Berlin	200m T47

Tereza Jakschová (born 1 September 1995) is a Czech Paralympic athlete who competes in international track and field competitions. She was born without her left forearm. She is a two-time European medalist in sprinting events. She has also competed at the 2020 and 2024 Summer Paralympics, where she did not medal.
