= Anastasiia Soloveva =

Russian Paralympic athlete (born 1997)

Personal information
- Born: 23 April 1997 (age 29) Degtyarsk, Sverdlovsk Oblast, Russia

Sport
- Sport: Para-athletics
- Disability class: T47
Medal record
Women's para-athletics
Representing RPC
Paralympic Games
Bronze medal – third place	2020 Tokyo	400 m T47
Representing Neutral Paralympic Athletes
World Championships
Silver medal – second place	2025 New Delhi	400 m T47
Representing Russia
European Championships
Gold medal – first place	2021 Bydgoszcz	400 m T47
Gold medal – first place	2021 Bydgoszcz	Universal 4×100 m
Bronze medal – third place	2021 Bydgoszcz	100 m T47
Bronze medal – third place	2021 Bydgoszcz	200 m T47

Anastasiia Soloveva (Russian: Анастасия Соловьёва, romanized: Anastasiya Solovyova; born 23 April 1997) is a Russian Paralympic athlete. She won a bronze medal at the 2020 Summer Paralympics in the Women's 400 metres T47 event.
