= Anrune Weyers =

South African Paralympic athlete

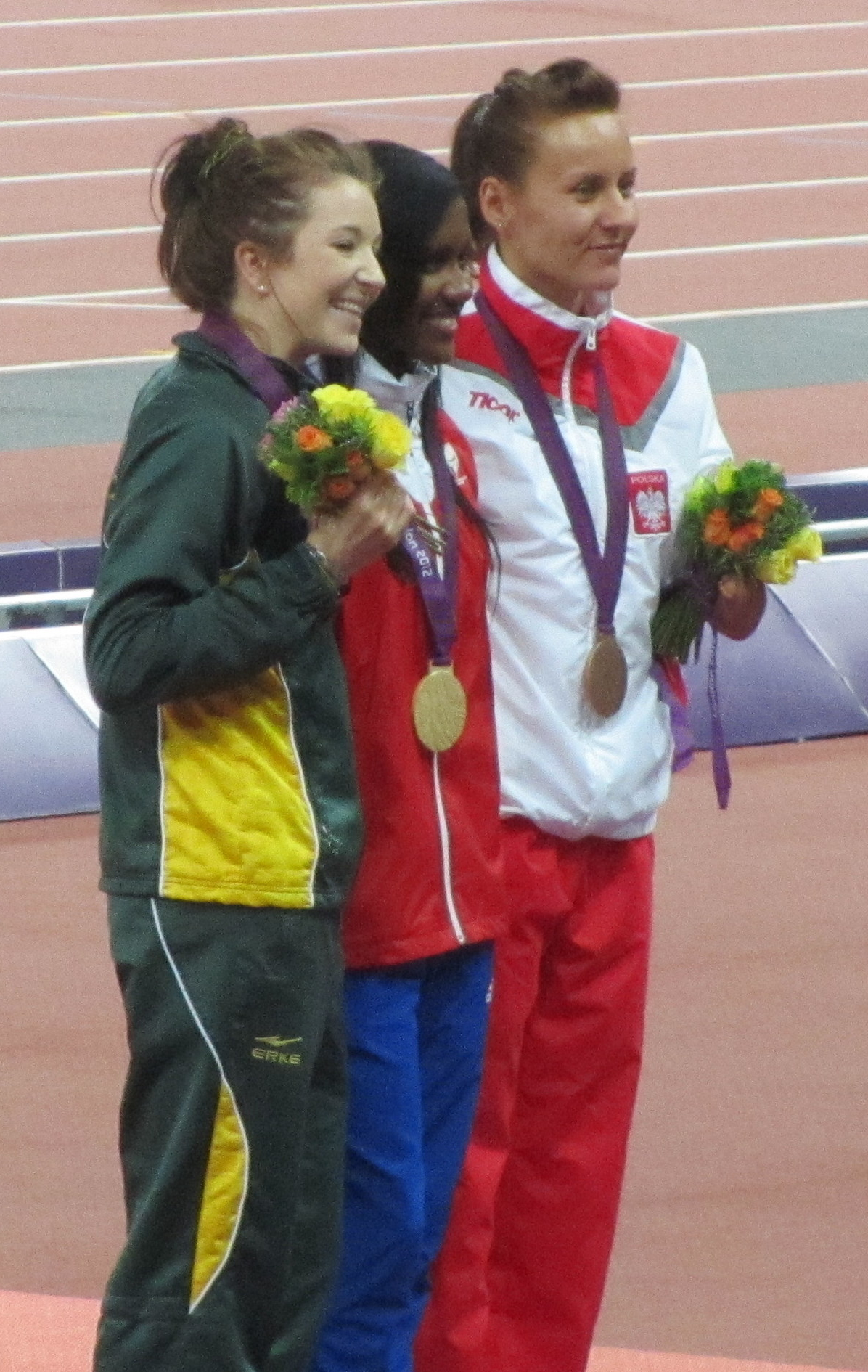
- Weyers (left) at the 400m T46 medal ceremony at the 2012 Paralympics

Personal information
- Nationality: South African
- Born: November 3, 1992 (age 33) Johannesburg, South Africa
- Height: 1.67 m (5 ft 6 in)
- Weight: 52 kg (115 lb)

Sport
- Disability class: T47
Medal record
Representing South Africa
Paralympic Games
Gold medal – first place	2020 Tokyo	T47 400 m
Silver medal – second place	2012 London	T46 400 m
Silver medal – second place	2016 Rio de Janeiro	T47 400 m
Silver medal – second place	2016 Rio de Janeiro	T47 200 m
Bronze medal – third place	2012 London	T46 200 m
IPC Athletics World Championships
Gold medal – first place	2015 Doha	T47 400 m
Gold medal – first place	2019 Dubai	T47 400 m
Silver medal – second place	2011 Christchurch	T46 400 m
Silver medal – second place	2013 Lyon	T46 200 m
Silver medal – second place	2013 Lyon	T46 400 m
Silver medal – second place	2017 London	T47 200 m
Silver medal – second place	2019 Dubai	T47 200 m
Bronze medal – third place	2015 Doha	T47 200 m
- Updated on 28 August 2021

Anrune Weyers (née Liebenberg, born 3 November 1992), is a South African para-athlete. She took up athletics in 2010. Weyers was born with a congenital defect in her left arm and competes in the T47 disability class. At the 2011 IPC Athletics World Championships she came second in the 400 m and sixth in the 200 m. In 2012, she won two medals at the London Paralympics, namely silver in the 400 m and bronze in the 200 m. Later that year these medals were stolen while she was travelling from George airport in the Western Cape. At the 2013 IPC World Championships she came second in both the 200 m and the 400 m.

At the 2015 IPC World Championships, she won the 400 m, and at the 2016 Rio Paralympics she won silver in both the 200 m and 400 m. Weyers won gold in the 400 m, silver in the 200 m and bronze in the 100 m at the 2019 World Para Athletics Championships in Dubai, and set the world record of 55.60 s for the 400 m at the Flanders Cup in Huizengin, Belgium in August 2019.

Weyers won gold in the 400 m T47 in Tokyo in 2021 (her third Paralympics) in a season's best time of 56.05 s.

== Personal life ==
Weyers is a Christian. Weyers is married to Stefan Weyers.
