= Fernanda Yara da Silva =

Brazilian Paralympic athlete

Fernanda Silva
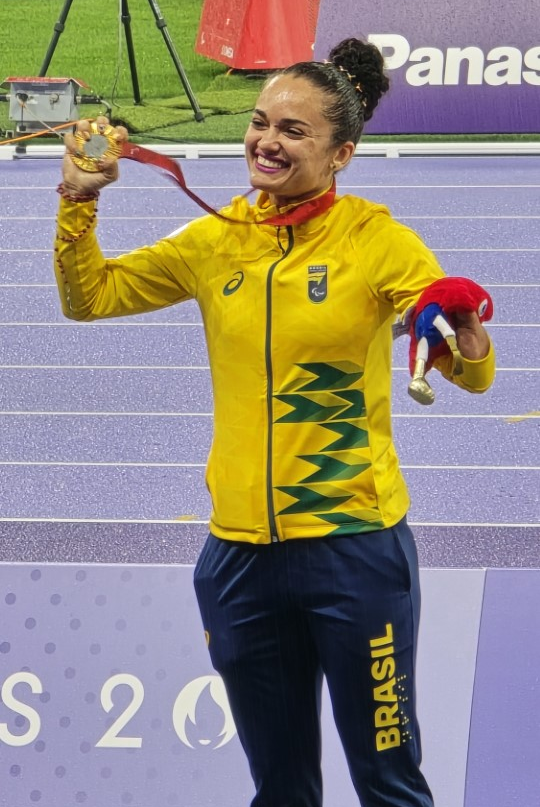
- Silva at the 2024 Summer Paralympics

Personal information
- Full name: Fernanda Yara da Silva
- Born: 15 August 1986 (age 40) Curionópolis, Brazil
- Home town: Petrolina, Brazil
- Height: 162 cm (5 ft 4 in)

Sport
- Country: Brazil
- Sport: Para athletics
- Disability class: T47
- Events: 100 metres 200 metres 400 metres
Medal record
Women's para athletics
Representing Brazil
Paralympic Games
Gold medal – first place	2024 Paris	400 m T47
World Championships
Gold medal – first place	2024 Kobe	400 m T47
Parapan American Games
Bronze medal – third place	2019 Lima	200 m T47
Bronze medal – third place	2019 Lima	400 m T47

Fernanda Yara da Silva (born 15 August 1986) is a Brazilian Paralympic athlete who competes in international level events. She is a two-time Parapan American Games bronze medalist and has participated at the 2008 Summer Paralympics.

== Personal life ==
Da Silva's left hand was amputated at birth due to myoma.
