= Li Lu (sprinter) =

Chinese Paralympic athlete (born 1994)

Personal information
- Born: 9 December 1994 (age 31) Dengzhou, China

Sport
- Country: China
- Sport: Paralympic athletics
- Disability class: T46
- Club: Henan Province
- Coached by: Yang Xiaoping (2019 - )
Medal record
Paralympic athletics
Representing China
Paralympic Games
Gold medal – first place	2016 Rio de Janeiro	400m T47
Bronze medal – third place	2016 Rio de Janeiro	200m T47
World Championships
Gold medal – first place	2017 London	400m T47
Silver medal – second place	2019 Doha	400m T47
Bronze medal – third place	2017 London	100m T47
Bronze medal – third place	2017 London	200m T47
Asian Para Games
Gold medal – first place	2022 Hangzhou	100m T47
Silver medal – second place	2022 Hangzhou	200m T47

Li Lu (born December 9, 1994) is a Chinese Paralympic athlete who competes in 200 metres and 400 metres events in international level. She had her left arm amputated after touching an electrical transformer.
