= Sae Tsuji =

Japanese Paralympic athlete

Personal information
- Born: 28 October 1994 (age 31) Nanae, Hokkaido, Japan

Sport
- Country: Japan
- Sport: Athletics
Medal record
Representing Japan
Paralympic Games
Bronze medal – third place	2016 Rio de Janeiro	400m T47
World Championships
Bronze medal – third place	2017 London	400m T47
Asian Para Games
Bronze medal – third place	2018 Jakarta	100m T45/46/47
Bronze medal – third place	2018 Jakarta	400m T45/46/47
Bronze medal – third place	2022 Hangzhou	400m T47

Sae Tsuji (辻 沙絵, Tsuji Sae; born 28 October 1994) is a Paralympic athlete of Japan with a unilateral upper limb impairment who was a medalist in Athletics at the 2016 Summer Paralympics.
