= Athletics at the 2020 Summer Paralympics – Women's 100 metres =

Athletics – Women's 100 metres at the XVI Paralympic Games
- Venue: Tokyo National Stadium
- Dates: 27 August – 4 September 2021
- No. of events: 13
- Competitors: 162 from 59 nations

The Women's 100m athletics events for the 2020 Summer Paralympics took place at the Tokyo National Stadium from August 27 to September 4, 2021. A total of 13 events were contested over this distance.

== Schedule ==
R	Round 1	½	Semifinals	F	Final

Date	Fri 27		Sat 28		Sun 29		Mon 30		Tue 31		Wed 1		Thu 2		Fri 3		Sat 4	
Event	M	E	M	E	M	E	M	E	M	E	M	E	M	E	M	E	M	E
T11 100m							R	½		F								
T12 100m												R	½	F				
T13 100m									R	F								
T34 100m				R	F													
T35 100m	F																	
T36 100m											R	F						
T37 100m												R	F					
T38 100m			R	F														
T47 100m									R	F								
T53 100m											R	F						
T54 100m											R	F						
T63 100m																	R	F
T64 100m														R		F		

== Medal summary ==
The following is a summary of the medals awarded across all 100 metres events.

Classification	Gold		Silver		Bronze	
T11	Venezuela; Linda Patricia Perez Lopez; Guide: Álvaro Cassiani	12.05	China; Liu Cuiqing; Guide: Xu Donglin	12.15	none awarded	
T12	Cuba; Omara Durand; Guide: Yuniol Kindelan	11.49	Ukraine; Oxana Boturchuk; Guide: Mykyta Barabanov	12.03	China; Liang Yanfen; Guide: Zhu Xuankang	12.51
T13	Adiaratou Iglesias Forneiro; Spain	11.96	Lamiya Valiyeva; Azerbaijan	11.99	Kym Crosby; United States	12.08
T34	Hannah Cockroft; Great Britain	16.39 WR	Kare Adenegan; Great Britain	17.03	Robyn Lambird; Australia	18.68
T35	Zhou Xia; China	13.00 WR	Isis Holt; Australia	13.13 AR	Maria Lyle; Great Britain	14.18
T36	Shi Yiting; China	13.61 WR	Elena Ivanova; RPC	14.60	Danielle Aitchison; New Zealand	14.62
T37	Wen Xiaoyan; China	13.00 WR	Jaleen Roberts; United States	13.16 AR	Jiang Fenfen; China	13.17
T38	Sophie Hahn; Great Britain	12.43	Darian Faisury Jiménez; Colombia	12.49 AR	Lindy Ave; Germany	12.77
T47	Lisbeli Vera Andrade; Venezuela	11.97	Brittni Mason; United States	11.97	Deja Young; United States	12.21
T53	Gao Fang; China	16.29	Zhou Hongzhuan; China	16.48	Samantha Kinghorn; Great Britain	16.53
T54	Zhou Zhaoqian; China	15.90	Amanda Kotaja; Finland	15.93	Cheri Madsen; United States	16.33
T63	Ambra Sabatini; Italy	14.11 WR	Martina Caironi; Italy	14.46	Monica Contrafatto; Italy	14.73
T64	Marlene van Gansewinkel; Netherlands	12.78 GR	Irmgard Bensusan; Germany	12.89 GR (T44)	Marissa Papaconstantinou; Canada	13.07

== Results ==
The following were the results of the finals only of each of the Women's 100 metres events in each of the classifications. Further details of each event, including where appropriate heats and semi finals results, are available on that event's dedicated page.

=== T11 ===
The T11 category is for athletes with a visual impairment. A T11 athlete may be entirely without sight, or be able to perceive light, but have no ability to see the shape of a hand at any distance. T11 athletes commonly run with guides.

The final in this classification took place on 31 August 2021, at 20:02:

Rank	Lane	Name	Nationality	Time	Notes
1st place, gold medalist(s)	3	Linda Patricia Perez Lopez	Venezuela	12.05	PB
2nd place, silver medalist(s)	1	Liu Cuiqing	China	12.15	SB
	5	Jerusa Geber Dos Santos	Brazil	DQ	WPA 6.15.3
	7	Thalita Simplício	Brazil	DQ	WPA 7.9.3

=== T12 ===
The T12 category is for athletes with visual impairment. Athletes in this category will generally have some residual sight, the ability to recognise the shape of a hand at a distance of 2 metres and the ability to perceive clearly will be no more than 2/60. T12 athletes commonly run with guides.

The final in this classification took place on 2 September 2021, at 19:20:

Rank	Lane	Name	Nationality	Time	Notes
1st place, gold medalist(s)	3	Omara Durand	Cuba	11.49	SB
2nd place, silver medalist(s)	5	Oxana Boturchuk	Ukraine	12.03	SB
3rd place, bronze medalist(s)	1	Liang Yanfen	China	12.51	
4	7	Darlenys de La Cruz Severino	Dominican Republic	12.53	

=== T13 ===
The T13 category is for athletes with a moderate visual impairment. Athletes in this category have a variety of visual impairments, but can typically recognize contours from a distance of 2 to 6 metres. Athletes in this category do not typically require a guide.

The final in this classification took place on 31 August 2021, at 20:10:

Rank	Lane	Name	Nationality	Time	Notes
1st place, gold medalist(s)	6	Adiaratou Iglesias Forneiro	Spain	11.96	
2nd place, silver medalist(s)	4	Lamiya Valiyeva	Azerbaijan	11.99	PB
3rd place, bronze medalist(s)	5	Kym Crosby	United States	12.08	
4	2	Iuliia Ianovskaia	Azerbaijan	12.30	PB
5	3	Johanna Pretorius	South Africa	12.33	PB
6	9	Leilia Adzhametova	Ukraine	12.37	
7	7	Elena Chebanu	Azerbaijan	12.41	
8	8	Rayane Soares Da Silva	Brazil	12.52	

=== T34 ===
The T34 category is for wheelchair athletes with cerebral palsy. Athletes in this category have minimal limitations or control problems in their arms and trunk while pushing a wheelchair.

The final in this classification took place on 29 August 2021, at 10:25:

Rank	Lane	Name	Nationality	Time	Notes
1st place, gold medalist(s)	4	Hannah Cockroft	Great Britain	16.39	WR
2nd place, silver medalist(s)	5	Kare Adenegan	Great Britain	17.03	SB
3rd place, bronze medalist(s)	3	Robyn Lambird	Australia	18.68	SB
4	2	Veronika Doronina	RPC	19.06	PB
5	7	Fabienne André	Great Britain	19.14	
6	8	Alexa Halko	United States	19.57	
7	6	Joyce Lefevre	Belgium	19.63	
8	1	Eva Houston	United States	19.82	PB
9	9	Amy Siemons	Netherlands	20.29	

=== T35 ===
The T35 category is for ambulant athletes with cerebral palsy. The typical T35 athlete may need assistive devices for walking. The athlete may have sufficient function to run but demonstrates poor balance.

The final in this classification took place on 27 August 2021, at 12:45:

Rank	Lane	Name	Nationality	Time	Notes
1st place, gold medalist(s)	7	Zhou Xia	China	13.00	WR
2nd place, silver medalist(s)	5	Isis Holt	Australia	13.13	AR
3rd place, bronze medalist(s)	4	Maria Lyle	Great Britain	14.18	SB
4	6	Isabelle Foerder	Germany	15.32	
5	2	Jagoda Kibil	Poland	15.38	PB
6	8	Fatimah Suwaed	Iraq	15.39	PB
7	3	Nienke Timmer	Netherlands	15.49	SB
8	9	Oxana Corso	Italy	15.68	SB

=== T36 ===
The T36 category is for ambulant athletes with cerebral palsy. These athletes do not have the capacity to remain still and they show involuntary movements with all four limbs affected. They usually walk without assistive devices.

The final in this classification took place on 1 September 2021, at 19:10:

Rank	Lane	Name	Nationality	Time	Notes
1st place, gold medalist(s)	6	Shi Yiting	China	13.61	WR
2nd place, silver medalist(s)	5	Elena Ivanova	RPC	14.60	
3rd place, bronze medalist(s)	7	Danielle Aitchison	New Zealand	14.62	
4	9	Yanina Martínez	Argentina	14.65	
5	3	Cheyenne Bouthoorn	Netherlands	14.90	
6	4	Nicole Nicoleitzik	Germany	14.95	
7	2	Samira da Silva Brito	Brazil	15.27	
8	8	Jeon Min-jae	South Korea	15.51	

=== T37 ===
The T37 category is for ambulant athletes with cerebral palsy. These athletes have movement and coordination problems on one half of their body. They have good ability in their dominant side of their body (ie hemiplegia).

The final in this classification took place on 2 September 2021, at 10:37:

Rank	Lane	Name	Nationality	Time	Notes
1st place, gold medalist(s)	6	Wen Xiaoyan	China	13.00	WR
2nd place, silver medalist(s)	5	Jaleen Roberts	United States	13.16	AR
3rd place, bronze medalist(s)	4	Jiang Fenfen	China	13.17	PB
4	7	Mandy François-Elie	France	13.51	
5	9	Sheryl James	South Africa	13.67	
6	3	Nataliia Kobzar	Ukraine	13.78	
7	2	Sabina Sukhanova	Uzbekistan	14.20	
8	8	Viktoriia Slanova	RPC	14.26	

=== T38 ===
The T38 category is for ambulant athletes with cerebral palsy. T38 athletes have the mildest form of impairment caused by cerebral palsy, often in only one limb, and not affecting the ability to run, walk or jump freely, although impairing performance. T38 athletes may suffer minor co-ordination difficulties.

The final in this classification took place on 28 August 2021, at 20:01:

Rank	Lane	Name	Nationality	Time	Notes
1st place, gold medalist(s)	6	Sophie Hahn	Great Britain	12.43	
2nd place, silver medalist(s)	5	Darian Faisury Jiménez	Colombia	12.49	AR
3rd place, bronze medalist(s)	7	Lindy Ave	Germany	12.77	PB
4	9	Luca Ekler	Hungary	12.82	
5	4	Rhiannon Clarke	Australia	13.08	SB
6	3	Olivia Breen	Great Britain	13.13	
7	2	Ella Pardy	Australia	13.14	SB
8	8	Ali Smith	Great Britain	13.24	

=== T47 ===
The T47 category is for athletes who have a single below elbow or wrist amputation or similar disability, with normal function in both legs.

The final in this classification took place on 31 August 2021, at 20:18:

Rank	Lane	Name	Nationality	Time	Notes
1st place, gold medalist(s)	4	Lisbeli Vera Andrade	Venezuela	11.97	PB
2nd place, silver medalist(s)	5	Brittni Mason	United States	11.97	
3rd place, bronze medalist(s)	7	Deja Young	United States	12.21	SB
4	6	Alicja Jeromin	Poland	12.22	
5	9	Saška Sokolov	Serbia	12.48	
6	2	Kiara Rodriguez	Ecuador	12.55	
7	8	Li Lu	China	12.60	
8	3	Aleksandra Moguchaia	RPC	12.71	

=== T53 ===
The T53 category is for wheelchair athletes with normal use of arms and hands, no or limited trunk function, and no leg function.

The final in this classification took place on 1 September 2021, at 20:37:

Rank	Lane	Name	Nationality	Time	Notes
1st place, gold medalist(s)	3	Gao Fang	China	16.29	SB
2nd place, silver medalist(s)	5	Zhou Hongzhuan	China	16.48	SB
3rd place, bronze medalist(s)	4	Samantha Kinghorn	Great Britain	16.53	
4	7	Jessica Cooper Lewis	Bermuda	16.90	SB
5	9	Hamide Doğangün	Turkey	16.94	SB
6	8	Catherine Debrunner	Switzerland	17.18	
7	6	Angie Ballard	Australia	17.43	
8	1	Kelsey Lefevour	United States	17.56	
9	2	Yen Hoang	United States	18.01	

=== T54 ===
The T54 category is for wheelchair athletes with no leg function, but near full arm function and reasonable to normal trunk function. Typically this may be caused by a lower spinal cord injury or spinal cord birth defect.

The final in this classification took place on 1 September 2021, at 20:46:

Rank	Lane	Name	Nationality	Time	Notes
1st place, gold medalist(s)	7	Zhou Zhaoqian	China	15.90	
2nd place, silver medalist(s)	6	Amanda Kotaja	Finland	15.93	SB
3rd place, bronze medalist(s)	5	Cheri Madsen	United States	16.33	SB
4	4	Hannah Dederick	United States	16.36	
5	9	Marie Emannuelle Anais Alphonse	Mauritius	16.48	AR
6	2	Momoka Muraoka	Japan	16.71	
7	8	Zübeyde Süpürgeci	Turkey	16.86	
8	3	Eliza Ault-Connell	Australia	17.12	

=== T63 ===
The final in this classification took place on 4 September 2021, at 21:26:

Rank	Lane	Name	Nationality	Time	Notes
1st place, gold medalist(s)	7	Ambra Sabatini	Italy	14.11	WR
2nd place, silver medalist(s)	6	Martina Caironi	Italy	14.46	
3rd place, bronze medalist(s)	4	Monica Contrafatto	Italy	14.73	
4	5	Karisma Evi Tiarani	Indonesia	14.83	GR (T42)
5	9	Elena Kratter	Switzerland	15.07	
6	2	Noelle Lambert	United States	15.97	AR
7	8	Sofia Gonzalez	Switzerland	16.38	
8	3	Tomomi Tozawa	Japan	16.48	

=== T64 ===
The final in this classification took place on 3 September 2021, at 19:14:

Rank	Lane	Name	Nationality	Time	Notes
1st place, gold medalist(s)	7	Marlene van Gansewinkel	Netherlands	12.78	GR
2nd place, silver medalist(s)	4	Irmgard Bensusan	Germany	12.89	GR (T44)
3rd place, bronze medalist(s)	6	Marissa Papaconstantinou	Canada	13.07	PB
4	2	Fleur Jong	Netherlands	13.10	GR (T62)
5	5	Kimberly Alkemade	Netherlands	13.12	
6	8	Beatriz Hatz	United States	13.31	
7	3	Sara Andres Barrio	Spain	13.39	
8	9	Sophie Kamlish	Great Britain	13.49	
