= Athletics at the 2020 Summer Paralympics – Women's 200 metres =

Athletics – Women's 200 metres at the XVI Paralympic Games
- Venue: Tokyo National Stadium
- Dates: 27 August – 4 September 2021
- No. of events: 7
- Competitors: 87 from 43 nations

The Women's 200m athletics events for the 2020 Summer Paralympics took place at the Tokyo National Stadium from August 31 to September 4, 2021. A total of 7 events were contested over this distance.

== Schedule ==
R	Round 1	½	Semifinals	F	Final

Date	Fri 27		Sat 28		Sun 29		Mon 30		Tue 31		Wed 1		Thu 2		Fri 3		Sat 4	
Event	M	E	M	E	M	E	M	E	M	E	M	E	M	E	M	E	M	E
T11 200m													R		½			F
T12 200m																R		F
T35 200m						F												
T36 200m				R	F													
T37 200m	R	F																
T47 200m																	R	F
T64 200m									R	F								

== Medal summary ==
The following is a summary of the medals awarded across all 200 metres events.

Classification	Gold		Silver		Bronze	
T11	Liu Cuiqing; China	24.94	Thalita Simplício; Brazil	24.94	Jerusa Geber; Brazil	25.19
T12	Omara Durand; Cuba	23.02 WR	Oxana Boturchuk; Ukraine	24.48	Anna Kulinich-Sorokina; RPC	24.85
T35	Zhou Xia; China	27.17 WR	Isis Holt; Australia	27.94 AR	Maria Lyle; Great Britain	30.24
T36	Shi Yiting; China	28.21 =WR	Danielle Aitchison; New Zealand	29.88	Yanina Martínez; Argentina	30.96
T37	Wen Xiaoyan; China	26.58 WR	Jiang Fenfen; China	27.33	Mandy François-Elie; France	27.34
T47	Lisbeli Vera Andrade; Venezuela	24.52	Brittni Mason; United States	25.00	Alicja Fiodorow; Poland	25.05 AR
T64	Marlene van Gansewinkel; Netherlands	26.22 GR	Irmgard Bensusan; Germany	26.58	Kimberly Alkemade; Netherlands	26.80

== Results ==
The following were the results of the finals only of each of the Women's 200 metres events in each of the classifications. Further details of each event, including where appropriate heats and semi finals results, are available on that event's dedicated page.

=== T11 ===
The T11 category is for athletes with a visual impairment. A T11 athlete may be entirely without sight, or be able to perceive light, but have no ability to see the shape of a hand at any distance. T11 athletes commonly run with guides.

The final in this classification took place on 4 September, at 19:29:

Rank	Lane	Name	Nationality	Time	Notes
1st place, gold medalist(s)	5	Liu Cuiqing	China	24.94	SB
2nd place, silver medalist(s)	3	Thalita Simplício	Brazil	24.94	=SB
3rd place, bronze medalist(s)	7	Jerusa Geber	Brazil	25.19	SB
4	1	Linda Patricia Pérez López	Venezuela	25.27	PB

=== T12 ===
The T12 category is for athletes with visual impairment. Athletes in this category will generally have some residual sight, the ability to recognise the shape of a hand at a distance of 2 metres and the ability to perceive clearly will be no more than 2/60. T12 athletes commonly run with guides.

The final in this classification took place on 4 September, at 19:39:

Rank	Lane	Name	Nationality	Time	Notes
1st place, gold medalist(s)	3	Omara Durand	Cuba	23.02	WR
2nd place, silver medalist(s)	5	Oxana Boturchuk	Ukraine	24.48	SB
3rd place, bronze medalist(s)	1	Anna Kulinich-Sorokina	RPC	24.85	SB
4	7	Alejandra Paola Pérez López	Venezuela	25.27	PB

=== T35 ===
The T35 category is for ambulant athletes with cerebral palsy. The typical T35 athlete may need assistive devices for walking. The athlete may have sufficient function to run but demonstrates poor balance.

The final in this classification took place on 29 August 2021, at 19:44:

Rank	Lane	Name	Nationality	Time	Notes
1st place, gold medalist(s)	4	Zhou Xia	China	27.17	WR
2nd place, silver medalist(s)	3	Isis Holt	Australia	27.94	AR
3rd place, bronze medalist(s)	5	Maria Lyle	Great Britain	30.24	SB
4	6	Jagoda Kibil	Poland	31.75	PB
5	2	Fatimah Suwaed	Iraq	32.79	PB
6	9	Nienke Timmer	Netherlands	32.87	PB
7	7	Isabelle Foerder	Germany	33.05	
8	8	Oxana Corso	Italy	33.13	SB
9	1	Saltanat Abilkhassymkyzy	Kazakhstan	35.47	

=== T36 ===
The T36 category is for ambulant athletes with cerebral palsy. These athletes do not have the capacity to remain still and they show involuntary movements with all four limbs affected. They usually walk without assistive devices.

The final in this classification took place on 29 August 2021, at 12:10:

Rank	Lane	Name	Nationality	Time	Notes
1st place, gold medalist(s)	6	Shi Yiting	China	28.21	=WR
2nd place, silver medalist(s)	7	Danielle Aitchison	New Zealand	29.88	
3rd place, bronze medalist(s)	5	Yanina Martínez	Argentina	30.96	SB
4	9	Jeon Min-jae	South Korea	31.17	SB
5	3	Cheyenne Bouthoorn	Netherlands	31.30	
6	8	Samira Da Silva	Brazil	31.92	
7	2	Táscitha Oliveira	Brazil	32.91	
	4	Nicole Nicoleitzik	Germany	DQ	WPA 18.5a

=== T37 ===
The T37 category is for ambulant athletes with cerebral palsy. These athletes have movement and coordination problems on one half of their body. They have good ability in their dominant side of their body (ie hemiplegia).

The final in this classification took place on 27 August 2021, at 19:16:

Rank	Lane	Name	Nationality	Time	Notes
1st place, gold medalist(s)	4	Wen Xiaoyan	China	26.58	WR
2nd place, silver medalist(s)	7	Jiang Fenfen	China	27.33	PB
3rd place, bronze medalist(s)	5	Mandy François-Elie	France	27.34	
4	6	Sheryl James	South Africa	27.57	AR
5	8	Nataliia Kobzar	Ukraine	27.92	
6	9	Jaleen Roberts	United States	28.02	AR
7	3	Viktoriia Slanova	RPC	28.84	
	2	Sabina Sukhanova	Uzbekistan	DNS	

=== T47 ===
The T47 category is for athletes who have a single below elbow or wrist amputation or similar disability, with normal function in both legs.

The final in this classification took place on 4 September 2021, at 19:50:

Rank	Lane	Name	Nationality	Time	Notes
1st place, gold medalist(s)	7	Lisbeli Vera Andrade	Venezuela	24.52	PB
2nd place, silver medalist(s)	5	Brittni Mason	United States	25.00	PB
3rd place, bronze medalist(s)	4	Alicja Fiodorow	Poland	25.05	AR
4	6	Anrune Weyers	South Africa	25.51	SB
5	3	Deja Young	United States	25.53	SB
6	8	Anastasiia Soloveva	RPC	25.60	
7	9	Saška Sokolov	Serbia	26.10	
8	2	Li Lu	China	26.37	

=== T64 ===
The final in this classification took place on 31 August 2021, at 19:52:

Rank	Lane	Name	Nationality	Time	Notes
1st place, gold medalist(s)	6	Marlene van Gansewinkel	Netherlands	26.22	GR
2nd place, silver medalist(s)	7	Irmgard Bensusan	Germany	26.58	
3rd place, bronze medalist(s)	4	Kimberly Alkemade	Netherlands	26.80	
4	8	Sydney Barta	United States	27.00	
5	5	Marissa Papaconstantinou	Canada	27.08	PB
6	3	Beatriz Hatz	United States	27.18	
7	9	Maria Tietze	Germany	28.22	
8	2	Anna Steven	New Zealand	28.88	
