= Athletics at the 2016 Summer Paralympics – Women's 200 metres =

The Women's 200m athletics events for the 2016 Summer Paralympics take place at the Estádio Olímpico João Havelange from September 8 to September 17, 2016. A total of 6 events were contested over this distance for 8 different classifications.

== Schedule ==
R	Round 1	½	Semifinals	F	Final

Event↓/Date →	Thu 8	Fri 9	Sat 10	Sun 11	Mon 12	Tue 13	Wed 14	Thu 15	Fri 16	Sat 17
T11 200m					R	F				
T12 200m				R	F					
T35 200m										F
T36 200m					R	F				
T44 200m							R	F		
T47 200m								R	F	

== Medal summary ==
Classification	Gold		Silver		Bronze	
T11	Libby Clegg guide: Chris Clarke; Great Britain	24.51	Liu Cuiqing guide: Xu Donglin; China	24.85	Zhou Guohua guide: Jia Dengpu; China	24.99
T12	Omara Durand guide: Yuniol Kindelan; Cuba	23.05	Oksana Boturchuk guide: Volodymyr Burakov; Ukraine	23.65	Elena Chebanu guide: Hakim Ibrahimov; Azerbaijan	23.80
T35	Zhou Xia; China	28.22	Isis Holt; Australia	28.79	Maria Lyle; Great Britain	29.35
T36	Shi Yiting; China	28.74	Jeon Min-jae; South Korea	31.06	Claudia Nicoleitzik; Germany	31.13
T44	Marlou van Rhijn; Netherlands	26.16	Irmgard Bensusan; Germany	26.90	Marie-Amelie Le Fur; France	27.11
T47	Deja Young; United States	25.46	Alicja Fiodorow; Poland	25.61	Li Lu; China	26.26

== Results ==
The following were the results of the finals of each of the women's 200 metres events in each of the classifications. Further details of each event are available on that event's dedicated page.

=== T11 ===
The T11 category is for athletes with a visual impairment. A T11 athlete may be entirely without sight, or be able to perceive light, but have no ability to see the shape of a hand at any distance. T11 athletes commonly run with guides.

19:42 13 September 2016:

Rank	Lane	Bib	Name	Nationality	Reaction	Time	Notes
1st place, gold medalist(s)	7	325	Libby Clegg	Great Britain	0.181	24.51	
2nd place, silver medalist(s)	5	169	Cuiqing Liu	China	0.148	24.85	
3rd place, bronze medalist(s)	1	187	Guohua Zhou	China	0.163	24.99	
	3	105	Terezinha Guilhermina	Brazil			DSQ

=== T12 ===
The T12 category is for athletes with visual impairment. Athletes in this category will generally have some residual sight, the ability to recognise the shape of a hand at a distance of 2 metres and the ability to perceive clearly will be no more than 2/60. T12 athletes commonly run with guides.

10:57 12 September 2016:

Rank	Lane	Bib	Name	Nationality	Reaction	Time	Notes
1st place, gold medalist(s)	5	242	Omara Durand	Cuba	0.182	23.05	
2nd place, silver medalist(s)	7	872	Oksana Boturchuk	Ukraine	0.245	23.65	
3rd place, bronze medalist(s)	3	63	Elena Chebanu	Azerbaijan	0.176	23.80	
4	1	371	Katrin Mueller-Rottgardt	Germany	0.162	24.71	

=== T35 ===
The T35 category is for ambulant athletes with cerebral palsy. The typical T35 athlete may need assistive devices for walking. The athlete may have sufficient function to run but demonstrates poor balance.

11:13 17 September 2016:

Rank	Lane	Bib	Name	Nationality	Reaction	Time	Notes
1st place, gold medalist(s)	8	189	Xia Zhou	China		28.22	
2nd place, silver medalist(s)	7	42	Isis Holt	Australia		28.79	
3rd place, bronze medalist(s)	6	338	Maria Lyle	Great Britain		29.35	
4	4	449	Oxana Corso	Italy		32.68	
5	5	34	Brianna Coop	Australia		33.08	
6	3	252	Anna Luxova	Czech Republic		35.76	
7	2	376	Uta Streckert	Germany		37.51	

=== T36 ===
The T36 category is for ambulant athletes with cerebral palsy. These athletes do not have the capacity to remain still and they show involuntary movements with all four limbs affected. They usually walk without assistive devices.

10:50 13 September 2016:

Rank	Lane	Bib	Name	Nationality	Reaction	Time	Notes
1st place, gold medalist(s)	5	174	Yiting Shi	China		28.74	
2nd place, silver medalist(s)	3	493	Min-jae Jeon	South Korea		31.06	
3rd place, bronze medalist(s)	6	372	Claudia Nicoleitzik	Germany		31.13	
4	4	22	Yanina Andrea Martinez	Argentina		31.21	
5	8	109	Tascitha Oliveira Cruz	Brazil		31.34	
6	2	915	Allysa Seely	United States		32.40	
7	7	219	Daniela Rodriguez Angulo	Colombia		32.83	
8	1	399	Kwok Fan Yam	Hong Kong		34.87	

=== T44 ===
The T44 category is for athletes who have a single below knee amputation or who can walk with moderately reduced function in one or both legs.

17:45 15 September 2016:

Rank	Lane	Bib	Name	Nationality	Reaction	Time	Notes
1st place, gold medalist(s)	5	618	Marlou van Rhijn	Netherlands		26.16	
2nd place, silver medalist(s)	6	359	Irmgard Bensusan	Germany		26.90	
3rd place, bronze medalist(s)	4	308	Marie-Amelie le Fur	France		27.11	
4	3	779	Abassia Rahmani	Switzerland		27.84	
5	7	345	Laura Sugar	Great Britain		28.31	
6	1	890	Femita Ayanebeku	United States		28.81	
7	2	476	Saki Takakuwa	Japan		28.88	
8	8	453	Giuseppina Versace	Italy		28.90	

=== T47 ===
The T47 category is for athletes who have a single below elbow or wrist amputation or similar disability, with normal function in both legs.

Rank	Lane	Bib	Name	Nationality	Reaction	Time	Notes
1st place, gold medalist(s)	4	919	Deja Young	United States		25.46	
2nd place, silver medalist(s)	6	689	Alicja Fiodorow	Poland		25.61	
3rd place, bronze medalist(s)	7	166	Lu Li	China		26.26	
4	5	737	Anrune Liebenberg	South Africa		26.57	
5	3	307	Angelina Lanza	France		26.60	
6	1	771	Amara Indumathi Karunathi Lallwala Palliya G.	Sri Lanka		27.54	
7	8	479	Sae Tsuji	Japan		27.97	
8	2	152	Amanda Cerna	Chile		28.19	
