= Athletics at the 2024 Summer Paralympics – Women's 100 metres T36 =

Women's 100 metres T36 at the XVII Paralympic Games
- Venue: Stade de France
- Dates: 4 September 2024
- Competitors: 12 from 9 nations
- Winning time: 13.39

Medalists
1st place, gold medalist(s)		Shi Yiting	China
2nd place, silver medalist(s)		Danielle Aitchison	New Zealand
3rd place, bronze medalist(s)		Verônica Hipólito	Brazil

100 metres at the 2024 Summer Paralympics
Men · T11 · T12 · T13 · T34 · T35 · T36 · T37 · T38 · T44 · T47 · T51 · T52 · T53 · T54 · T63 · T64
Women · T11 · T12 · T13 · T34 · T35 · T36 · T37 · T38 · T47 · T53 · T54 · T63 · T64

The women's 100 metres T36 event at the 2024 Summer Paralympics in Paris, took place on 4 September 2024.

The T36 category is for ambulant athletes with cerebral palsy. These athletes do not have the capacity to remain still and they show involuntary movements with all four limbs affected. They usually walk without assistive devices.

== Records ==
Prior to the competition, the existing records were as follows:

World Record	Shi Yiting (CHN)	13.35	(Japan) Kobe	20 May 2024
Paralympic Record	Shi Yiting (CHN)	13.61	(Japan) Tokyo	1 September 2021

Area	Time		Athlete	Location	Date
Africa	16.79		(Tunisia) Syrine Bessaidi	(Tunisia) Tunis	24 March 2016
America	14.01		(Brazil) Táscitha Oliveira	(Brazil) São Paulo	25 April 2019
Asia	13.35	WR	(China) Shi Yiting	(Japan) Kobe	20 May 2024
Europe	14.13		(Russia) Elena Ivanova	(Qatar) Doha	27 October 2015
Oceania	13.41		(New Zealand) Danielle Aitchison	(New Zealand) Wellington	15 March 2024

== Results ==
=== Round 1 ===
First 3 in each heat (Q) and the next 2 fastest (q) advance to the Final.

==== Heat 1 ====
Rank	Lane	Athlete	Nation	Time	Notes
1	3	Danielle Aitchison	New Zealand	13.74	Q
2	5	Verônica Hipólito	Brazil	14.38	Q
3	7	Mali Lovell	Australia	14.57	Q, PB
4	4	Araceli Rotela	Argentina	14.63	q
5	6	Jae Jeon	South Korea	14.69	q, SB
6	8	Nicole Nicoleitzik	Germany	14.95	SB
Source:				Wind: +0.8 m/s	

==== Heat 2 ====
Rank	Lane	Athlete	Nation	Time	Notes
1	3	Shi Yiting	China	14.28	Q
2	6	Samira Da Silva Brito	Brazil	14.86	Q
3	4	Cheyenne Bouthoorn	Netherlands	14.90	Q
4	8	Abby Craswell	Australia	15.28	
5	5	Fan Yam	Hong Kong	15.62	
6	7	Yanina Martínez	Argentina	16.30	
Source:				Wind: -1.2 m/s	

=== Final ===
Rank	Lane	Athlete	Nation	Time	Notes
1st place, gold medalist(s)	6	Shi Yiting	China	13.39	PR
2nd place, silver medalist(s)	5	Danielle Aitchison	New Zealand	13.43	
3rd place, bronze medalist(s)	7	Verônica Hipólito	Brazil	14.24	SB
4	9	Mali Lovell	Australia	14.45	PB
5	8	Araceli Rotela	Argentina	14.80 (.798)	
6	3	Cheyenne Bouthoorn	Netherlands	14.80 (.799)	
7	2	Jae Jeon	South Korea	14.95	
–	4	Samira Da Silva Brito	Brazil	DQ	R17.8
Source:				Wind: -0.6 m/s	
