= Athletics at the 2020 Summer Paralympics – Women's 200 metres T36 =

Women's 200 metres T36 at the XVI Paralympic Games
- Venue: Tokyo National Stadium
- Dates: 28 August 2021 (heats); 29 August 2021 (final)
- Competitors: 10 from 9 nations
- Winning time: 28.21

Medalists
| 1st place, gold medalist(s) | | Shi Yiting | China |
| 2nd place, silver medalist(s) | | Danielle Aitchison | New Zealand |
| 3rd place, bronze medalist(s) | | Yanina Martínez | Argentina |

The women's 200 metres T36 event at the 2020 Summer Paralympics in Tokyo took place between 28 and 29 August 2021.

The T36 category is for ambulant athletes with cerebral palsy. These athletes do not have the capacity to remain still and they show involuntary movements with all four limbs affected. They usually walk without assistive devices.

== Records ==
Prior to the competition, the existing records were as follows:

| World Record | Shi Yiting (CHN) | 28.21 | Dubai, United Arab Emirates | 9 November 2019 |
| Paralympic Record | Wang Fang (CHN) | 28.60 | Athens, Greece | 26 September 2004 |

| Area | Time | Athlete | Nation |
|---|---|---|---|
| Africa | 35.65 | Syrine Bessaidi | Tunisia |
| America | 30.31 | Yanina Martínez | Argentina |
| Asia | 28.21 WR | Shi Yiting | China |
| Europe | 29.67 | Elena Ivanova | Russia |
| Oceania | 29.86 | Danielle Aitchison | New Zealand |

== Results ==
=== Heats ===
Heat 1 took place on 28 August 2021, at 21:26:

| Rank | Lane | Name | Nationality | Time | Notes |
|---|---|---|---|---|---|
| 1 | 7 | Danielle Aitchison | New Zealand | 30.12 | Q |
| 2 | 4 | Yanina Martínez | Argentina | 30.97 | Q, SB |
| 3 | 5 | Samira Da Silva Brito | Brazil | 31.82 | Q |
| 4 | 6 | Elena Sviridova | RPC | 34.19 | |
| 5 | 3 | Yam Kwok Fan | Hong Kong | 34.79 | SB |

Heat 2 took place on 28 August 2021, at 21:33:

| Rank | Lane | Name | Nationality | Time | Notes |
|---|---|---|---|---|---|
| 1 | 5 | Shi Yiting | China | 29.37 | Q, SB |
| 2 | 4 | Nicole Nicoleitzik | Germany | 31.31 | Q |
| 3 | 7 | Jeon Min-jae | South Korea | 31.37 | Q, SB |
| 4 | 6 | Cheyenne Bouthoorn | Netherlands | 31.62 | q |
| 5 | 3 | Tascitha Oliveira Cruz | Brazil | 32.30 | q, SB |

=== Final ===
The final took place on 29 August 2021, at 12:10:

| Rank | Lane | Name | Nationality | Time | Notes |
|---|---|---|---|---|---|
| 1st place, gold medalist(s) | 6 | Shi Yiting | China | 28.21 | =WR |
| 2nd place, silver medalist(s) | 7 | Danielle Aitchison | New Zealand | 29.88 | |
| 3rd place, bronze medalist(s) | 5 | Yanina Martínez | Argentina | 30.96 | SB |
| 4 | 9 | Jeon Min-jae | South Korea | 31.17 | SB |
| 5 | 3 | Cheyenne Bouthoorn | Netherlands | 31.30 | |
| 6 | 8 | Samira Da Silva Brito | Brazil | 31.92 | |
| 7 | 2 | Tascitha Oliveira Cruz | Brazil | 32.91 | |
| | 4 | Nicole Nicoleitzik | Germany | DQ | WPA 18.5a |
