= 2023 World Para Athletics Championships – Women's 200 metres =

The women's 200 metres at the 2023 World Para Athletics Championships were held in the Charlety Stadium, Paris, France, from 11 to 17 July.

== Medalists ==
Event	Gold	Silver	Bronze
T11	Jerusa Geber; Brazil	Liu Cuiqing; China	Thalita Simplicio; Brazil
T12	Omara Durand; Cuba	Alejandra Paola Pérez López; Venezuela	Valentina Petrillo; Italy
T13	Adiaratou Iglesias Forneiro; Spain	Bianca Borgella; Canada	Erin Kerkhoff; United States
T35	Zhou Xia; China	Guo Tianqian; China	Maria Lyle; United Kingdom
T36	Danielle Aitchison; New Zealand	Mali Lovell; Australia	Nicole Nicoleitzik; Germany
T37	Karen Palomeque; Colombia	Wen Xiaoyan; China	Jaleen Roberts; United States
T38	Luca Ekler; Hungary	Darian Faisury Jiménez; Colombia	Sophie Hahn; United Kingdom
T47	Brittni Mason; United States	Saška Sokolov; Serbia	Sasirawan Inthachot; Thailand
T64	Irmgard Bensusan; Germany	Kimberly Alkemade; Netherlands	Marissa Papaconstantinou; Canada

== T11 ==
The final of this event was held at on 17 Jul 2023 at Charlety Stadium, Paris.

Rank	Lane	Name	Nationality	Time	Notes
1st place, gold medalist(s)	5	Jerusa Geber; Guide: Santos Gabriel Aparecido Dos	Brazil	24.63	CR
2nd place, silver medalist(s)	7	Cuiqing Liu; Guide: Shengming Chen	China	24.79	SB
3rd place, bronze medalist(s)	3	Thalita Simplicio; Guide: Felipe Veloso	Brazil	24.88	PB
4	1	Lahja Ishitile; Guide: Sem Shimanda	Namibia	25.62	SB

== T12 ==
The final of this event was held at 17:55 on 17 Jul 2023 at Charlety Stadium, Paris, France.

Rank	Lane	Name	Nationality	Time	Notes "
1st place, gold medalist(s)	3	Omara Durand	Cuba	23.07	SB
2nd place, silver medalist(s)	7	Alejandra Perez Lopez	Venezuela	25.42	SB
3rd place, bronze medalist(s)	1	Valentina Petrillo	Italy	26.31	
-	5	Katrin Mueller-Rottgardt	Germany	DQ	

== T13 ==
The final of this event was held at 19:58 on 12 Jul 2023 at Charlety Stadium, Paris, France.

Rank	Lane	Name	Nationality	Time	Notes "
1	4	Adiaratou Iglesias	Spain	24.86	SB
2	5	Bianca Borgella	Canada	25	PB
3	3	Erin Kerkhoff	United States	25.58	PB
4	6	Rayane Soares Da Silva	Brazil	25.69	
5	8	Nantenin Keita	France	26.45	SB
6	7	Alice Metais	France	26.54	PB
7	2	Candela Cerrudo	Argentina	26.72	PB
8	1	Celia Terki	France	27.21	

== T35 ==
The event took place on 11 July.

Rank	Lane	Name	Nationality	Time	Notes
1st place, gold medalist(s)	5	Zhou Xia	China	28.77	SB
2nd place, silver medalist(s)	3	Guo Tianqian	China	29.91	PB
3rd place, bronze medalist(s)	4	Maria Lyle	Great Britain	31.01	
4	8	Fatimah Suwaed	Iraq	31.55	
5	1	Ingrid Renecka	Poland	32.52	PB
6	6	Jagoda Kibil	Poland	33.08	SB
7	7	Isabelle Foerder	Germany	33.84	
8	2	Valeriia Yanhol	Ukraine	34.16	PB

== T36 ==
The event took place on 15 July.

Rank	Lane	Name	Nationality	Time	Notes
1st place, gold medalist(s)	3	Danielle Aitchison	New Zealand	28.50	AR
2nd place, silver medalist(s)	5	Mali Lovell	Australia	30.19	PB
3rd place, bronze medalist(s)	7	Nicole Nicoleitzik	Germany	30.84	PB
4	8	Araceli Rotela	Argentina	30.94	=PB
5	4	Samira Da Silva	Brazil	31.21	
6	1	Jeon Min-jae	South Korea	32.28	SB
7	6	Yanina Martínez	Argentina	32.34	
8	2	Abby Craswell	Australia	32.96	PB

== T37 ==
The final of this event was held at 18:02 on 17 Jul 2023 at Charlety Stadium, Paris, France.

Rank	Lane	Name	Nationality	Time	Notes "
1st place, gold medalist(s)	4	Karen Palomeque	Colombia	WR	
2nd place, silver medalist(s)	5	Wen Xiaoyan	China	AR	
3rd place, bronze medalist(s)	6	Jaleen Roberts	United States	PB	
4	3	Nataliia Kobzar	Ukraine	PB	
5	7	Sheryl James	South Africa	SB	
6	2	Fenfen Jiang	China	SB	
7	8	Francois-Elie Mandy	France	SB	
8	1	Alina Terekh	Ukraine		

== T38 ==
The final of this event was held at 19:49 on 14 Jul 2023 at Charlety Stadium, Paris, France.

Rank	Lane	Name	Nationality	Time	Notes "
1st place, gold medalist(s)	4	Luca Ekler	Hungary	25.78	WR
2nd place, silver medalist(s)	6	Darian Faisury Jiménez	Colombia	26.04	AR
3rd place, bronze medalist(s)	1	Sophie Hahn	Great Britain	26.35	SB
4	3	Rhiannon Clarke	Australia	27.1	
5	5	Ella Pardy	Australia	27.41	
6	8	Katty Hurtado	Colombia	27.58	18.6 (c)
7	2	Vilma Berg	Finland	30.48	SB
8	7	Katia Hardies	Belgium	32.38	

== T47 ==
The final of this event was held at 18:09 on 17 Jul 2023 at Charlety Stadium, Paris, France.

Rank	Lane	Name	Nationality	Time	Notes
1st place, gold medalist(s)	5	Brittni Mason	United States	25.36	SB
2nd place, silver medalist(s)	4	Saska Sokolov	Serbia	25.55	SB
3rd place, bronze medalist(s)	6	Sasirawan Inthachot	Thailand	25.97	
4	3	Fernanda Yara Da Silva	Brazil	26.08	
5	7	Lu Li	China	26.34	
6	2	Amanda Rummery	Canada	26.61	SB
7	1	Teresita Briozzi	Argentina	26.86	
8	8	Tereza Jakschova	Czech Republic	27.01	

== T64 ==
The final of this event was held at Final on 17 Jul 2023 at Charlety Stadium, Paris, France.

Rank	Lane	Name	Nationality	Time	Notes "
1st place, gold medalist(s)	5	Irmgard Bensusan	Germany	26.82	CR
2nd place, silver medalist(s)	3	Kimberly Alkemade	Netherlands	27.06	
3rd place, bronze medalist(s)	4	Marissa Papaconstantinou	Canada	27.23	SB
4	7	Sofia Vazquez Amaris	Puerto Rico	30.57	PB
-	6	Marlene van Gansewinkel	Netherlands	DQ	18.5 (a)
-	8	Yaimillie Marie Diaz Colon	Puerto Rico	DQ	18.5 (a)
