= Athletics at the 2020 Summer Paralympics – Women's 100 metres T36 =

Women's 100 metres T36 at the XVI Paralympic Games
- Venue: Tokyo National Stadium
- Dates: 1 September 2021 (final)
- Competitors: 10 from 9 nations
- Winning time: 13.61

Medalists
1st place, gold medalist(s)		Shi Yiting	China
2nd place, silver medalist(s)		Elena Ivanova	RPC
3rd place, bronze medalist(s)		Danielle Aitchison	New Zealand

The women's 100 metres T36 event at the 2020 Summer Paralympics in Tokyo, took place on 1 September 2021.

The T36 category is for ambulant athletes with cerebral palsy. These athletes do not have the capacity to remain still and they show involuntary movements with all four limbs affected. They usually walk without assistive devices.

== Records ==
Prior to the competition, the existing records were as follows:

World record	Shi Yiting (CHN)	13.68	London, United Kingdom	20 July 2017
Paralympic record	Wang Fang (CHN)	13.82	Beijing, China	16 September 2008

Area	Time	Athlete	Nation
Africa	16.79	Syrine Bessaidi	Tunisia
America	14.01	Tascitha Oliveira Cruz	Brazil
Asia	13.68 WR	Shi Yiting	China
Europe	14.13	Elena Ivanova	Russia
Oceania	14.46	Danielle Aitchison	New Zealand

== Results ==
=== Heats ===
Heat 1 took place on 1 September 2021, at 11:15:

Rank	Lane	Name	Nationality	Time	Notes
1	3	Danielle Aitchison	New Zealand	14.35	Q, AR
2	5	Elena Ivanova	RPC	14.46	Q, SB
3	7	Yanina Martínez	Argentina	14.60	Q, SB
4	4	Cheyenne Bouthoorn	Netherlands	14.84	q, PB
5	6	Samira da Silva Brito	Brazil	15.05	q

Heat 2 took place on 1 September 2021, at 11:22:

Rank	Lane	Name	Nationality	Time	Notes
1	3	Shi Yiting	China	14.50	Q, SB
2	5	Nicole Nicoleitzik	Germany	14.87	Q
3	6	Jeon Min-jae	South Korea	15.41	Q, SB
4	7	Táscitha Oliveira Cruz	Brazil	15.72	
5	4	Yam Kwok-fan	Hong Kong	16.15	SB

=== Final ===
The final took place on 1 September 2021, at 19:10:

Rank	Lane	Name	Nationality	Time	Notes
1st place, gold medalist(s)	6	Shi Yiting	China	13.61	WR
2nd place, silver medalist(s)	5	Elena Ivanova	RPC	14.60	
3rd place, bronze medalist(s)	7	Danielle Aitchison	New Zealand	14.62	
4	9	Yanina Martínez	Argentina	14.65	
5	3	Cheyenne Bouthoorn	Netherlands	14.90	
6	4	Nicole Nicoleitzik	Germany	14.95	
7	2	Samira da Silva Brito	Brazil	15.27	
8	8	Jeon Min-jae	South Korea	15.51	
