= Athletics at the 2016 Summer Paralympics – Women's 200 metres T36 =

Women's 200 metres T36 at the XV Paralympic Games
- Venue: Estádio Olímpico João Havelange
- Dates: 13 September 2016
- Competitors: 12 from 11 nations

Medalists
1st place, gold medalist(s)		Yiting Shi	China
2nd place, silver medalist(s)		Min-jae Jeon	South Korea
3rd place, bronze medalist(s)		Claudia Nicoleitzik	Germany

The T36 category is for ambulant athletes with cerebral palsy. These athletes do not have the capacity to remain still and they show involuntary movements with all four limbs affected. They usually walk without assistive devices.

The Athletics at the 2016 Summer Paralympics – Women's 200 metres T36 event at the 2016 Paralympic Games took place on 13 September 2016, at the Estádio Olímpico João Havelange.

== Heats ==
=== Heat 1 ===
11:13 12 September 2016:

Rank	Lane	Bib	Name	Nationality	Reaction	Time	Notes
1	6	22	Yanina Andrea Martinez	Argentina		30.80	Q
2	4	372	Claudia Nicoleitzik	Germany		31.18	Q
3	3	219	Daniela Rodriguez Angulo	Colombia		32.22	Q
4	8	915	Allysa Seely	United States		32.36	q
5	5	399	Kwok Fan Yam	Hong Kong		34.73	q
	7	551	Sandra Fonseca Solis	Mexico			DSQ

=== Heat 2 ===
11:19 12 September 2016:

Rank	Lane	Bib	Name	Nationality	Reaction	Time	Notes
1	4	174	Yiting Shi	China		30.87	Q
2	3	493	Min-jae Jeon	South Korea		31.25	Q
3	7	109	Tascitha Oliveira Cruz	Brazil		31.39	Q
4	8	214	Martha Liliana Hernandez Florian	Colombia		34.94	
5	5	831	Syrine Bessaidi	Tunisia		37.27	
6	6	33	Tamsin Noelle Colley	Australia		37.80	

== Final ==
10:50 13 September 2016:

Rank	Lane	Bib	Name	Nationality	Reaction	Time	Notes
1st place, gold medalist(s)	5	174	Yiting Shi	China		28.74	
2nd place, silver medalist(s)	3	493	Min-jae Jeon	South Korea		31.06	
3rd place, bronze medalist(s)	6	372	Claudia Nicoleitzik	Germany		31.13	
4	4	22	Yanina Andrea Martinez	Argentina		31.21	
5	8	109	Tascitha Oliveira Cruz	Brazil		31.34	
6	2	915	Allysa Seely	United States		32.40	
7	7	219	Daniela Rodriguez Angulo	Colombia		32.83	
8	1	399	Kwok Fan Yam	Hong Kong		34.87	
