= Athletics at the 2020 Summer Paralympics – Women's 100 metres T35 =

Women's 100 metres T35 at the XVI Paralympic Games
- Venue: Tokyo National Stadium
- Dates: 27 August 2021 (final)
- Competitors: 10 from 10 nations
- Winning time: 13.00

Medalists
1st place, gold medalist(s)		Zhou Xia	China
2nd place, silver medalist(s)		Isis Holt	Australia
3rd place, bronze medalist(s)		Maria Lyle	Great Britain

The women's 100 metres T35 event at the 2020 Summer Paralympics in Tokyo, took place on 27 August 2021.

The T35 category is for ambulant athletes with cerebral palsy. The typical T35 athlete may need assistive devices for walking. The athlete may have sufficient function to run but demonstrates poor balance.

== Records ==
Prior to the competition, the existing records were as follows:

World Record	Isis Holt (AUS)	13.43	London, United Kingdom	19 July 2017
Paralympic Record	Zhou Xia (CHN)	13.66	Rio de Janeiro, Brazil	14 September 2016

Area	Time	Athlete	Nation
Africa	17.90	Chenelle van Zyl	South Africa
America	16.07	Virginia McLachlan	Canada
Asia	13.56	Zhou Xia	China
Europe	13.92	Maria Lyle	Great Britain
Oceania	13.43 WR	Isis Holt	Australia

== Results ==
=== Heats ===
Heat 1 took place on 27 August 2021, at 10:00:

Rank	Lane	Name	Nationality	Time	Notes
1	6	Zhou Xia	China	13.86	Q, SB
2	3	Maria Lyle	Great Britain	14.34	Q, SB
3	7	Fatimah Suwaed	Iraq	15.61	Q, PB
4	4	Jagoda Kibil	Poland	15.64	q, SB
5	5	Nienke Timmer	Netherlands	15.68	q

Heat 2 took place on 27 August 2021, at 10:07:

Rank	Lane	Name	Nationality	Time	Notes
1	7	Isis Holt	Australia	13.49	Q, PB
2	6	Isabelle Foerder	Germany	15.65	Q
3	4	Oxana Corso	Italy	15.80	Q, SB
4	3	Saltanat Abilkhassymkyzy	Kazakhstan	16.54	
5	5	Anna Luxová	Czech Republic	17.60	SB

=== Final ===
The final took place on 27 August 2021, at 12:45

Rank	Name	Nationality	Time	Notes
1st place, gold medalist(s)	Zhou Xia	China	13.00	WR
2nd place, silver medalist(s)	Isis Holt	Australia	13.13	AR
3rd place, bronze medalist(s)	Maria Lyle	Great Britain	14.18	SB
4	Isabelle Foerder	Germany	15.32	
5	Jagoda Kibil	Poland	15.38	PB
6	Fatimah Suwaed	Iraq	15.39	PB
7	Nienke Timmer	Netherlands	15.49	SB
8	Oxana Corso	Italy	15.68	SB
