= Athletics at the 2020 Summer Paralympics – Women's 200 metres T35 =

Women's 200 metres T35 at the XVI Paralympic Games
- Venue: Tokyo National Stadium
- Dates: 29 August 2021 (final)
- Competitors: 9 from 9 nations
- Winning time: 27.17

Medalists
| 1st place, gold medalist(s) | | Zhou Xia | China |
| 2nd place, silver medalist(s) | | Isis Holt | Australia |
| 3rd place, bronze medalist(s) | | Maria Lyle | Great Britain |

The women's 200 metres T35 event at the 2020 Summer Paralympics in Tokyo took place on 29 August 2021.

The T35 category is for ambulant athletes with cerebral palsy. The typical T35 athlete may need assistive devices for walking. The athlete may have sufficient function to run but demonstrates poor balance.

== Records ==
Prior to the competition, the existing records were as follows:

| World Record | Zhou Xia (CHN) | 28.22 | Rio de Janeiro, Brazil | 17 September 2016 |
| Paralympic Record | Zhou Xia (CHN) | 28.22 | Rio de Janeiro, Brazil | 17 September 2016 |

| Area | Time | Athlete | Nation |
|---|---|---|---|
| Africa | 42.64 | Eunice Njoroge | Kenya |
| America | 34.03 | Virginia McLachlan | Canada |
| Asia | 28.22 WR | Zhou Xia | China |
| Europe | 29.32 | Maria Lyle | Great Britain |
| Oceania | 28.30 | Isis Holt | Australia |

== Results ==
The final took place on 29 August 2021, at 19:44:

| Rank | Lane | Name | Nationality | Time | Notes |
|---|---|---|---|---|---|
| 1st place, gold medalist(s) | 4 | Zhou Xia | China | 27.17 | WR |
| 2nd place, silver medalist(s) | 3 | Isis Holt | Australia | 27.94 | AR |
| 3rd place, bronze medalist(s) | 5 | Maria Lyle | Great Britain | 30.24 | SB |
| 4 | 6 | Jagoda Kibil | Poland | 31.75 | PB |
| 5 | 2 | Fatimah Suwaed | Iraq | 32.79 | PB |
| 6 | 9 | Nienke Timmer | Netherlands | 32.87 | PB |
| 7 | 7 | Isabelle Foerder | Germany | 33.05 | |
| 8 | 8 | Oxana Corso | Italy | 33.13 | SB |
| 9 | 1 | Saltanat Abilkhassymkyzy | Kazakhstan | 35.47 | |
