= 2015 IPC Athletics World Championships – Women's 200 metres =

The women's 200 metres at the 2015 IPC Athletics World Championships was held at the Suheim Bin Hamad Stadium in Doha from 22–31 October.

== Medalists ==
Event	Gold		Silver		Bronze	
T11	Liu Cuiqing; Guide: Xu Donglin; China	24.75 AS	Terezinha Guilhermina; Guide: Guilherme Soares de Santana; Brazil	24.95	Jhulia Santos; Guide: Fabio Dias de Oliveira Silva; Brazil	26.24
T12	Omara Durand; Guide: Yuniol Kindelan; Cuba	23.03 WR	Oxana Boturchuk; Guide: Oleksiy Ryemyen; Ukraine	23.98	Elena Chebanu; Azerbaijan	24.54
T13	Ilse Hayes; South Africa	25.24	Kym Crosby; United States	25.93	Sanaa Benhama; Morocco	26.35
T35	Isis Holt; Australia	28.57 WR	Maria Lyle; Great Britain	29.32 AR	Oxana Corso; Italy	32.20 PB
T36	Elena Sviridova; Russia	29.67 AR	Claudia Nicoleitzik; Germany	30.53 SB	Yanina Andrea Matinez; Argentina	31.04
T37	Li Yingli; China	28.85 AS	Anna Sapozhnikova; Russia	29.27 PB	Johanna Benson; Namibia	29.98 SB
T38	Margarita Goncharova; Russia	26.61 WR	Sophie Hahn; Great Britain	26.82 PB	Chen Junfei; China	27.28 AR
T44	Marlou van Rhijn (T43); Netherlands	25.75	Marie-Amelie le Fur (T44); France	26.58	Fleur Jong (T43); Netherlands	27.30
T47	Yunidis Castillo (T46); Cuba	25.43 SB	Deja Young (T46); United States	25.53	Anrune Liebenberg (T47); South Africa	25.58 SB
T52	Marieke Vervoort; Belgium	35.91	Kerry Morgan; United States	37.60	—N/a	
T53	Angela Ballard; Australia	29.33 CR	Catherine Debrunner; Switzerland	30.64 PB	Samantha Kinghorn; Great Britain	30.72
T54	Amanda Kotaja; Finland	29.82	Cheri Madsen; United States	29.96	Hannah McFadden; United States	29.96
WR world record | AR area record | CR championship record | GR games record | NR national record | OR Olympic record | PB personal best | SB season best | WL world leading (in a given season)

== See also ==
- List of IPC world records in athletics
