= Athletics at the 2016 Summer Paralympics – Women's 100 metres T35 =

Women's 100 metres T35 at the XV Paralympic Games
- Venue: Estádio Olímpico João Havelange
- Dates: 14 September 2016
- Competitors: 7 from 6 nations

Medalists
1st place, gold medalist(s)		Zhou Xia	China
2nd place, silver medalist(s)		Isis Holt	Australia
3rd place, bronze medalist(s)		Maria Lyle	Great Britain

The T35 category is for ambulant athletes with cerebral palsy. The typical T35 athlete may need assistive devices for walking. The athlete may have sufficient function to run but demonstrates poor balance.

The Athletics at the 2016 Summer Paralympics – Women's 100 metres T35 event at the 2016 Paralympic Games took place on 14 September 2016, at the Estádio Olímpico João Havelange.

== Final ==
10:54 14 September 2016:

Rank	Lane	Bib	Name	Nationality	Reaction	Time	Notes
1st place, gold medalist(s)	7	189	Zhou Xia	China		13.66	
2nd place, silver medalist(s)	2	42	Isis Holt	Australia		13.75	
3rd place, bronze medalist(s)	3	338	Maria Lyle	Great Britain		14.41	
4	6	34	Brianna Coop	Australia		15.56	
5	5	449	Oxana Corso	Italy		15.67	
6	4	376	Uta Streckert	Germany		17.66	
	8	252	Anna Luxova	Czech Republic			DSQ
