= Athletics at the 2016 Summer Paralympics – Women's 200 metres T35 =

Women's 200 metres T35 at the XV Paralympic Games
- Venue: Estádio Olímpico João Havelange
- Dates: 17 September 2016
- Competitors: 7 from 6 nations

Medalists
1st place, gold medalist(s)		Xia Zhou	China
2nd place, silver medalist(s)		Isis Holt	Australia
3rd place, bronze medalist(s)		Maria Lyle	Great Britain

The T35 category is for ambulant athletes with cerebral palsy. The typical T35 athlete may need assistive devices for walking. The athlete may have sufficient function to run but demonstrates poor balance.

The Athletics at the 2016 Summer Paralympics – Women's 200 metres T35 event at the 2016 Paralympic Games took place on 17 September 2016, at the Estádio Olímpico João Havelange.

== Final ==
11:13 17 September 2016:

Rank	Lane	Bib	Name	Nationality	Reaction	Time	Notes
1st place, gold medalist(s)	8	189	Xia Zhou	China		28.22	
2nd place, silver medalist(s)	7	42	Isis Holt	Australia		28.79	
3rd place, bronze medalist(s)	6	338	Maria Lyle	Great Britain		29.35	
4	4	449	Oxana Corso	Italy		32.68	
5	5	34	Brianna Coop	Australia		33.08	
6	3	252	Anna Luxova	Czech Republic		35.76	
7	2	376	Uta Streckert	Germany		37.51	
