= 2015 IPC Athletics World Championships – Women's 100 metres =

The women's 100 metres at the 2015 IPC Athletics World Championships was held at the Suheim Bin Hamad Stadium in Doha from 22 to 31 October.

== Medalists ==
Event	Gold		Silver		Bronze	
T11	Liu Cuiqing; Guide: Xu Donglin; China	12.43	Jerusa Geber; Guide: Luiz Henrique Barboza da Silva; Brazil	12.57	Jhulia Santos; Guide: Fabio Dias de Oliveira Silva; Brazil	12.79
T12	Omara Durand; Guide: Yuniol Kindelan; Cuba	11.48 WR	Elena Chebanu; Azerbaijan	11.94	Oxana Boturchuk; Guide: Oleksiy Ryemyen; Ukraine	11.96 PB
T13	Isle Hayes; South Africa	12.37	Nantenin Keïta; France	12.53 SB	Kym Crosby; United States	12.63
T34	Hannah Cockroft; Great Britain	17.73 CR	Alexa Halko; United States	18.55 AR	Amy Siemons; Netherlands	18.99
T35	Isis Holt; Australia	13.63 WR	Maria Lyle; Great Britain	13.92 AR	Brianna Coop; Australia	15.11 PB
T36	Elena Sviridova; Russia	14.13 CR	Yanina Andrea Martinez; Argentina	14.72	Claudia Nicoleitzik; Germany	14.73 PB
T37	Kadeena Cox; Great Britain	13.60	Georgina Hermitage; Great Britain	13.87	Anna Sapozhnikova; Russia	14.30
T38	Sophie Hahn; Great Britain	12.60 WR	Chen Junfei; China	12.97 AR	Margarita Goncharova; Russia	13.01 PB
T42	Martina Caironi; Italy	14.61 WR	Vanessa Low; Germany	15.41 PB	Ana Claudia Silva; Brazil	16.28
T44	Marlou van Rhijn (T43); Netherlands	12.80 WR	Marie-Amelie le Fur (T44); France	13.12 CR	Nyoshia Cain (T44); Trinidad and Tobago	13.31 PB
T47	Deja Young (T46); United States	12.69	Wang Yanping (T47); China	12.74	Alicja Fiodorow (T47); Poland	12.74
T52	Marieke Vervoort; Belgium	20.39	Kerry Morgan; United States	20.97 SB	Yuka Kiyama; Japan	25.37
T53	Huang Lisha; China	16.29 CR	Hamide Kurt; Turkey	17.10 AR	Jessica Cooper Lewis; Bermuda	17.40
T54	Liu Wenjun; China	16.08	Amanda Kotaja; Finland	16.32	Hannah McFadden; United States	16.91
WR world record | AR area record | CR championship record | GR games record | NR national record | OR Olympic record | PB personal best | SB season best | WL world leading (in a given season)

== See also ==
- List of IPC world records in athletics
