= New Zealand at the 2020 Summer Paralympics =

- IPC code: NZL
- NPC: Paralympics New Zealand
- Website: paralympics.org.nz

in Tokyo
- Competitors: 29 in 6 sports
- Flag bearers: Sophie Pascoe & William Stedman (styled Hāpai Kara, leadership roles replacing flag bearer titles)
- Medals Ranked 21st: Gold 6 Silver 3 Bronze 3 Total 12

Summer Paralympics appearances (overview)
- 1968; 1972; 1976; 1980; 1984; 1988; 1992; 1996; 2000; 2004; 2008; 2012; 2016; 2020; 2024

New Zealand competed at the 2020 Summer Paralympics in Tokyo, Japan. Originally to be held from 25 August to 6 September 2020, the event was postponed by one year due to the COVID-19 pandemic and was held from 24 August to 5 September 2021. It was New Zealand's 14th appearance at Summer Paralympics.

== Medallists ==
Medal	Name	Sport	Event	Date
Gold	Tupou Neiufi	Swimming	Women's 100 metre backstroke S8	27 August
Gold	Lisa Adams	Athletics	Women's shot put F37	28 August
Gold	Sophie Pascoe	Swimming	Women's 100 metre freestyle S9	31 August
Gold	Sophie Pascoe	Swimming	Women's 200 metre individual SM9	1 September
Gold	Anna Grimaldi	Athletics	Women's long jump T47	3 September
Gold	Holly Robinson	Athletics	Women's javelin throw F46	3 September
Silver	Sophie Pascoe	Swimming	Women's 100 metre breaststroke SB8	26 August
Silver	Danielle Aitchison	Athletics	Women's 200 metres T36	29 August
Silver	William Stedman	Athletics	Men's long jump T36	30 August
Bronze	Sophie Pascoe	Swimming	Women's 100 metre backstroke S9	30 August
Bronze	William Stedman	Athletics	Men's 400 metres T36	31 August
Bronze	Danielle Aitchison	Athletics	Women's 100 metres T36	1 September

== Competitors ==
Sport	Men	Women	Total
Athletics	2	6	8
Canoeing	2	0	2
Cycling	2	4	6
Shooting	1	0	1
Swimming	1	3	4
Wheelchair rugby	8	0	8
Total	16	13	29

== Officials ==
Former Paralympic cyclist and gold medallist Paula Tesoriero was appointed Chef de Mission in 2019.

== Athletics ==
In May 2021, New Zealand announced a squad of six track and field athletes to compete at the Summer Paralympics — Holly Robinson, Caitlin Dore, Anna Grimaldi, William Stedman, Lisa Adams and Danielle Aitchison. In July 2021, shot putter Ben Tuimaseve was added to the team. In August 2021, sprinter Anna Steven was added to the team.

Key

- Note–Ranks given for preliminary rounds are within the athlete's heat only.
- Q = Qualified for the next round
- q = Qualified for the next round as a fastest loser
- DQ = Disqualified
- PR = Paralympic record
- WR = World record
- N/A = Round not applicable for the event

=== Track ===
Athlete	Event	Heats		Final	
Athlete	Event	Result	Rank	Result	Rank
Danielle Aitchison	Women's 100 m T36	14.35	1 Q	14.62	3rd place, bronze medalist(s)
Danielle Aitchison	Women's 200 m T36	30.12	1 Q	29.88	2nd place, silver medalist(s)
William Stedman	Men's 400 m T36	—N/a		54.75	3rd place, bronze medalist(s)
Anna Steven	Women's 100 m T64	DQ (WPA 17.8)		Did not advance	
Anna Steven	Women's 200 m T64	28.60	5 Q	28.88	8

=== Field ===
Athlete	Event	Final	
Athlete	Event	Distance	Position
Lisa Adams	Women's shot put F37	15.12 PR	1st place, gold medalist(s)
Lisa Adams	Women's discus throw F38	29.69	7
Caitlin Dore	Women's shot put F37	9.03	8
Anna Grimaldi	Women's long jump T47	5.76 PR	1st place, gold medalist(s)
Holly Robinson	Women's javelin throw F46	40.99	1st place, gold medalist(s)
William Stedman	Men's long jump T36	5.64	2nd place, silver medalist(s)
Ben Tuimaseve	Men's shot put F37	13.31	9

== Canoeing ==
In June 2021, New Zealand announced a team of two para canoe athletes for the Summer Paralympics — Corbin Hart and Scott Martlew.

Key

- Note–Ranks given for preliminary rounds are within the canoeist's heat only.
- FA = Qualified for Final A
- FB = Qualified for Final B
- SF = Advanced to Semifinals

Athlete	Event	Heats		Semifinals		Finals	
Athlete	Event	Time	Rank	Time	Rank	Time	Rank
Corbin Hart	Men's 200 m KL3	43.538	6 SF	42.290	5 FB	44.182	5
Scott Martlew	Men's 200 m KL2	43.588	1 FA	Bye		42.880	4
Scott Martlew	Men's 200 m VL3	55.439	6 SF	51.704	3 FA	54.756	8

== Cycling ==
In July 2021, New Zealand confirmed a team of six cyclists to compete at the Summer Paralympics — Stephen Hills, Sarah Ellington, Eltje Malzbender, Rory Mead, Nicole Murray and Anna Taylor.

=== Road ===
Athlete	Event	Final	
Athlete	Event	Result	Rank
Sarah Ellington	Women's time trial C1–3	29:04.08	10
Sarah Ellington	Women's road race C1–3	1:21:23	12
Stephen Hills	Men's time trial T1–2	32:26.36	8
Stephen Hills	Men's road race T1–2	54:13	6
Eltje Malzbender	Women's time trial T1–2	38:52.55	5
Eltje Malzbender	Women's road race T1–2	DNF	
Rory Mead	Men's time trial H2	36:53.78	5
Rory Mead	Men's road race H1–2	2:23:08	5
Nicole Murray	Women's time trial C5	41:45.50	6
Nicole Murray	Women's road race C4–5	2:25.27	6
Anna Taylor	Women's time trial C4	DNF	

=== Track ===
Athlete	Event	Qualification		Final	
Athlete	Event	Result	Rank	Result	Rank
Sarah Ellington	Women's individual pursuit C1–3	4:12.506	11	Did not advance	
Nicole Murray	Women's 500 m time trial C4–5	—N/a		37.657	6
Nicole Murray	Women's individual pursuit C5	3:45.010	4 QB	3.44.482	4
Anna Taylor	Women's individual pursuit C4	3:54.167	5	Did not advance	
Anna Taylor	Women's 500 m time trial C4–5	—N/a		38.713	8

== Shooting ==
In July 2021, New Zealand confirmed the selection of sport shooter Michael Johnson for his fifth Paralympic Games.

Athlete	Event	Qualification		Final	
Athlete	Event	Score	Rank	Score	Rank
Michael Johnson	Mixed R4 – 10 m rifle standing SH2	633.7	2 Q	167	6
Michael Johnson	Mixed R5 – 10 m rifle prone SH2	635.2	9	Did not advance	
Michael Johnson	Mixed R5 – 50 m rifle prone SH2	620.2	13	Did not advance	

== Swimming ==
In April 2021, New Zealand announced a squad of five swimmers to compete at the Summer Paralympics — Sophie Pascoe, Cameron Leslie, Jesse Reynolds, Nikita Howarth and Tupou Neiufi. Leslie subsequently withdrew from the Games.

Key

- Note– Qualifiers for the finals (Q) of all events were decided on a time only basis, therefore ranks shown are overall ranks versus competitors in all heats. Also, ranks shown for those who did not advance are their final ranks.
- PR = Paralympic record
- WR = World record
- N/A = Round not applicable for the event

Athlete	Event	Heat		Final	
Athlete	Event	Time	Rank	Time	Rank
Nikita Howarth	Women's 100 m breaststroke SB7	1:36.05	3 Q	1:36.65	4
Nikita Howarth	Women's 50 m butterfly S7	38.46	8 Q	36.92	6
Tupou Neiufi	Women's 50 m freestyle S8	32.47	4 Q	31.48	5
Tupou Neiufi	Women's 100 m backstroke S8	—N/a		1:16.84	1st place, gold medalist(s)
Sophie Pascoe	Women's 100 m freestyle S9	1:03.75	1 Q	1:02.37	1st place, gold medalist(s)
Sophie Pascoe	Women's 100 m backstroke S9	1:11.02	3 Q	1:11.15	3rd place, bronze medalist(s)
Sophie Pascoe	Women's 100 m breaststroke SB8	1:21.75	2 Q	1:20.32	2nd place, silver medalist(s)
Sophie Pascoe	Women's 100 m butterfly S9	1:09.58	3 Q	1:09.31	5
Sophie Pascoe	Women's 200 m individual medley SM9	2:34.55	1 Q	2:32.73	1st place, gold medalist(s)
Jesse Reynolds	Men's 100 m backstroke S9	1:04.58	6 Q	1:04.60	6
Jesse Reynolds	Men's 100 m butterfly S9	1:05.64	16	Did not advance	
Jesse Reynolds	Men's 200 m individual medley SM9	2:24.89	7 Q	2:25.62	7
Jesse Reynolds	Men's 400 m freestyle S9	4:30.34	12	Did not advance	

== Wheelchair rugby ==
New Zealand national wheelchair rugby team qualified for the Games for the games by winning the gold medal at the 2019 Asia-Oceania Championship in Gangneung, South Korea.

Team roster

In May 2021, New Zealand announced a team of eight wheelchair rugby players to be coached by Greg Mitchell: In July 2021, Barney Koneferenisi replaced Cameron Leslie, who withdrew from the Games.

- Hayden Barton-Cootes
- Cody Everson
- Robert Hewitt
- Barney Koneferenisi
- Tainafi Lefono
- Gareth Lynch
- Gavin Rolton (captain)
- Mike Todd

Squad	Group stage				Semifinal	7th vs 8th	Rank
Squad	Opposition Result	Opposition Result	Opposition Result	Rank	Opposition Result	Opposition Result	Rank
New Zealand national team	United States; L 63–35	Great Britain; L 37–60	Canada; L 36–51	4	Did not advance	Denmark; L 56-53	8

Group stage

Pos	Team	Pld	W	D	L	GF	GA	GD	Pts	Qualification
1	United States	3	3	0	0	171	137	+34	6	Semi-finals
2	Great Britain	3	2	0	1	158	134	+24	4	Semi-finals
3	Canada	3	1	0	2	152	144	+8	2	Fifth place Match
4	New Zealand	3	0	0	3	108	174	−66	0	Seventh place Match

Source: Tokyo2020
25 August 2021
12:45

United States	63–35	New Zealand

Yoyogi National Stadium, Tokyo

26 August 2021
12:45

New Zealand	37–60	Great Britain

Yoyogi National Stadium, Tokyo

27 August 2021
12:45

New Zealand	36–51	Canada

Yoyogi National Stadium, Tokyo

Seventh place match

28 August 2021
11:30

Denmark	56–53	New Zealand

Yoyogi National Stadium, Tokyo

== See also ==
- New Zealand at the Paralympics
- New Zealand at the 2020 Summer Olympics
