= Mali Lovell =

Australian Paralympic athlete

Personal information
- Nationality: Australia
- Born: 3 June 2004 (age 22)
Medal record
Women's para athletics
Representing Australia
Paralympic Games
Bronze medal – third place	2024 Paris	200 m T36
World Championships
Silver medal – second place	2023 Paris	200m T36
Silver medal – second place	2025 New Delhi	100m T36
Silver medal – second place	2025 New Delhi	200m T36
Bronze medal – third place	2024 Kobe	200m T36

Mali Lovell (born 3 June 2004) is an Australian track and field para-athlete who competes in T36 classification events. She won silver and bronze medals at World Para Athletics Championships. Lovell won a bronze medal at 2024 Summer Paralympics, Paris, France – her first Games.

== Personal ==
She was born on 4 June 2004 with ataxia, a rare type of cerebral palsy that affects balance and coordination. She graduated from Mackellar Girls Campus in 2022.

== Sporting career ==
Lovell took up athletics at the age of twelve and is classified as T36 athlete. She is coached by Katie Edwards and Melinda Gainsford-Taylor in Sydney and narrowly missed qualifying for the 2020 Tokyo Paralympics. At the 2023 World Para Athletics Championships in Paris, her first major international competition, she won the silver medal in the Women's 200m T36 and was seventh in the Women's 100m T36.

At the 2024 World Para Athletics Championships in Kobe, Japan, Lovell won the bronze medal in Women's 200m T36.

At the 2024 Paris Paralympics, she won the bronze medal in the Women's 200 metres T36 and finished fifth in the Women's 100 metres T36. At the 2025 World Para Athletics Championships in New Delhi, she won the silver medals in Women's 100m T36 in 14.56 (-0.6) and Women's 200m T36 in 29.69 (+1.0).

Lovell stated that " Athletics has changed my life. I was just trying to learn how to walk and talk at that young age. Now to be here … oh my god. I’m just happy to be there. I want to run fast."

== Recognition ==
- 2023 – Athletics Australia – Amy Winters Award for Female Para Athlete of the Year
