= Bianca Borgella =

Canadian para-athlete

Personal information
- Born: January 10, 2003 (age 23) Tampa, Florida, U.S.
- Home town: Rockland, Ontario, Canada
- Education: University of Ottawa

Sport
- Country: Canada
- Sport: Para-athletics
- Disability class: T13
Medal record
Women's para athletics
Representing Canada
World Championships
Silver medal – second place	2023 Paris	200 m T13
Bronze medal – third place	2023 Paris	100 m T13

Bianca Borgella (born January 10, 2003) is a Canadian para-athlete competing in the 100 metres and 200 metres in the T13 classification.

== Early life and education ==
Borgella was born with leber congenital amaurosis in Florida. She moved to Rockland, Ontario with her family as a child. She graduated from St. Francis Xavier Catholic High School in Ottawa. Borgella attends the University of Ottawa and is studying biology.

== Career ==
Borgella trained at the Ottawa Lions Track and Field Club. After she turned 18, she started pursuing track competitively. She received her T13 classification in 2021. In 2022, she won gold at the Canadian Track in Field Championships in the 400 metres, 100 metres, and U20 4 × 100 m relay. Also in 2022, she was presented with a Sam Estwick Memorial Award, which are awarded by the East Ottawa Lions Club to the outstanding athletes with disabilities.

At the 2023 World Para Athletics Championships in Paris, Borgella won silver in the T13 women's 200 metres and bronze in the T13 women's 100 metres, setting a Canadian record for the event. Also at the 2023 World Para Athletics Championships, Borgella competed on the Canadian universal 4 × 100 m relay team, placing fourth. She made her Paralympic debut in para-athletics at the 2024 Summer Paralympics. Going into the Games, she was ranked number two in the world in the 100m. Borgella made it to the finals in the women's T13 100m, but fell down around 40 metres into the race. She was able to cross the finish line in 25.11 seconds but was taken off the track wheelchair. She had been dealing with a hamstring injury in the lead-up to the Games and re-injured her hamstring, ending up with a grade 3 muscle tear.
