= Valentina Petrillo =

Italian Paralympic athlete (born 1973)

Personal information
- Born: 2 October 1973 (age 52) Naples, Italy
- Children: 2

Sport
- Country: Italy
- Sport: Paralympic athletics
- Disability class: T12
- Event: Sprint with sighted guide

Achievements and titles
- Paralympic finals: 2021 World Para Athletics European Championships
Medal record
Women's Paralympic athletics
Representing Italy
World Championships
Bronze medal – third place	2023 Paris	200 m T12

Valentina Petrillo (Italian: [valenˈtiːna peˈtrillo]; born 2 October 1973) is an Italian Paralympic athlete who competes in the women's 100, 200 and 400 metre T12 class visually impaired sprint.

Petrillo has been the first trans woman to take part in an international Paralympic Women's Championship, debuting at the Italian Paralympic Athletics Championships, a milestone for transgender people in sports.

== Biography ==
Valentina Petrillo was born in Naples, Italy, on 2 October 1973. She started practising athletics at a young age until a loss of sight at age 14, due to Stargardt disease. Soon after finishing studies in Bologna, Petrillo joined the Italy national five-a-side football team for the visually impaired.

In 2014, Petrillo was determined to get back into athletics, winning 11 national titles in the men's category.

In 2019, she started a gender transitioning process; Petrillo competed for the first time in the women's category at the Italian Paralympic Athletics Championships on 11 September 2020, marking the first time in paralympic sports that a transgender person was allowed to do so. Petrillo has noted she has lost strength since starting feminizing hormone replacement therapy, which is intended to suppress testosterone and raise estrogen levels in the body. Petrillo has met the World Para Athletics requirements for lowered testosterone levels for transgender women athletes which are tested for at least 12 months prior to the competition.

Petrillo's story will be narrated through a movie, currently in development, named 5 nanomoli-Il sogno olimpico di una donna trans.

=== Athletics career ===
In 2020, she started officially competing in the women's category, and on 25 April 2021, set a new national record on the 400 meters T13 class, then improved in June of the same year.

On 22 March 2021, she set another new record, this time in 200 meters T12. Petrillo represented Italy at the 2021 World Para Athletics European Championships, ranking 5th.

In March 2023, Petrillo withdrew from competing in the World Masters Indoor Athletic Championships on account of anti-trans threats and concerns for her safety.

On 2 September 2024, Petrillo debuted at the 2024 Summer Paralympics in Paris, qualifying for the semi-finals of the T12 women's 400 metres. She achieved a personal best time of 57.58 seconds in the second semi-final, but failed to reach the final of the event. Petrillo also qualified for the semi-finals of the T12 women's 200 metres on 6 September. She finished ninth with a season's-best time of 25.92 seconds, but failed to advance to the final.

== Personal life ==
Petrillo was previously married to a woman. Her wife supported Petrillo's transition. They share a son.

== National records ==
Seniores

- 200 meters plain T12: 27"17 ( (Italy) Ancona, 22 March 2021)
- 400 meters plain indoor T13: 59"77 ( (Italy) Piacenza, 20 June 2021)
