= Abby Craswell =

Australian Paralympic athlete

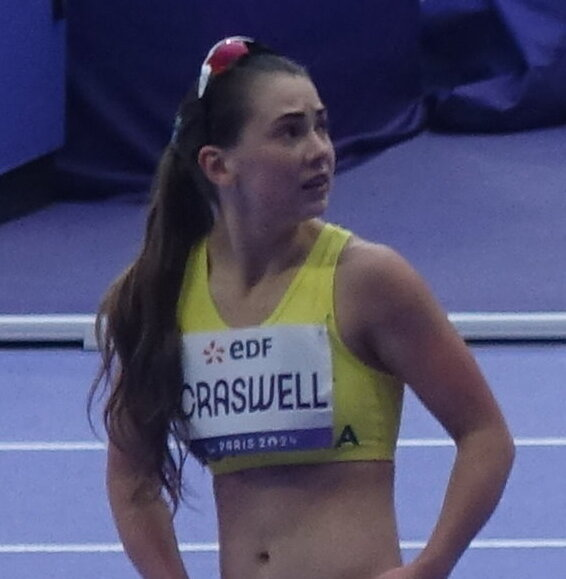
- Craswell at the 2024 Summer Paralympics

Personal information
- Nationality: Australian
- Born: 17 July 2004 (age 21)

Sport
- Country: Australia
- Sport: Athletics
- Coached by: Sebastian Kuzminski and Andrew Craswell

Abby Craswell (born 17 July 2004) is an Australian Paralympic athletics competitor with cerebral palsy. She competed at the 2024 Paris Paralympics.

== Personal ==
Craswell was born on 17 July 2004 with cerebral palsy. She attended Moreton Bay College in Brisbane. In 2023, she is currently studying a Bachelor of Occupational Therapy (Honours) at Griffith University.

== Athletics ==
At the age of eleven, she transitioned from gymnastics to athletics. She is classified as a T36 athlete. She started in athletics in 2015 being coached by her father Andrew.

At the 2023 World Para Athletics Championships, she finished fifth in the Women's 100 m T36 and sixth in Women's 200 m T36. At the 2024 Paris Paralympics, she competed in Women's 100 metres T36 and did not qualify for the final.

At the 2025 World Para Athletics Championships in New Delhi, she finished seventh in the Women's 100 m T36.

Her idol is Australian Paralympian Rachael Dodds. Craswell is supported by the Queensland Academy of Sport.
