= Saltanat Abilkhassymkyzy =

Kazakh Paralympic athlete

Personal information
- Nationality: Kazakh
- Born: 14 January 2000 (age 26) Taraz, Kazakhstan

Sport
- Sport: Paralympic athletics
- Disability: Cerebral palsy
- Disability class: T35
- Event: Sprints

Saltanat Abilkhassymkyzy (born 14 January 2000) is a Kazakh Paralympic athlete. She made her first Paralympic appearance during the 2020 Summer Paralympics.

== Career ==
She represented Kazakhstan at the 2020 Summer Paralympics and competed in both women's 100m T35 and women's 200m T35 events.
