= Anna Luxová =

Czech Paralympic athlete (born 1997)

Personal information
- Nationality: Czech
- Born: 28 May 1997 (age 29) Písek, Czech Republic

Sport
- Sport: Paralympic athletics
- Disability: Cerebral palsy
- Disability class: T35
- Event: Sprints
Medal record
Women's para athletics
Representing Czech Republic
Paralympic Games
Bronze medal – third place	2020 Tokyo	Shot put F35
European Championships
Silver medal – second place	2021 Bydgoszcz	Shot put F35
Bronze medal – third place	2018 Berlin	Shot put F35

Anna Luxová (born 28 May 1997) is a Czech Paralympic athlete. She has represented Czech Republic at the Paralympics on three occasions in 2012, 2016 and 2020.

== Career ==
Anna made her Paralympic debut representing Czech Republic at the 2012 Summer Paralympics at the age of 15 and competed in both women's 100m T35 and women's 200m T35.

In addition to competing in sprint events, she began training and competing in shot put events due to the uncertainties emerged over her sprinting career after undergoing Achilles tendon surgery at the age of 17. Despite the uncertainties, she took part in women's 100m T35 and women's 200m T35 events at the 2016 Summer Paralympics.

She also represented Czech Republic at the 2020 Summer Paralympics and competed in both women's shot put and women's 100m T35 events.
