= Shi Yiting =

Chinese Paralympic athlete

Personal information
- Nationality: Chinese
- Born: 17 October 1997 (age 28) Chengzhou, China
- Height: 1.58 m (5 ft 2 in)

Sport
- Country: China
- Sport: Paralympic athletics
- Disability class: T36
Medal record
Women's para athletics
Representing China
Paralympic Games
Gold medal – first place	2016 Rio de Janeiro	200m T36
Gold medal – first place	2020 Tokyo	100m T36
Gold medal – first place	2020 Tokyo	200m T36
Gold medal – first place	2024 Paris	100 m T36
Gold medal – first place	2024 Paris	200 m T36
World Championships
Gold medal – first place	2017 London	100m T36
Gold medal – first place	2017 London	200m T36
Gold medal – first place	2019 Dubai	100m T36
Gold medal – first place	2019 Dubai	200m T36
Gold medal – first place	2023 Paris	100m T36
Gold medal – first place	2024 Kobe	100m T36
Silver medal – second place	2024 Kobe	200m T36
Asian Para Games
Gold medal – first place	2022 Hangzhou	100m T36
Gold medal – first place	2022 Hangzhou	200m T36

Shi Yiting (born October 17, 1997) is a Chinese para athlete. She has impaired muscle movement in her left arm and different lengths in both of her legs. She won four gold medals at the Summer Paralympics and six gold medals at the World Para Athletics Championships.

In the 2020 Tokyo Paralympic Games, Yiting won the women's T36 class 100m final gold medal.

In the Kobe Para Athletics World Championships, held in East Asia, she won the women's 100m T36 final where she set a new world record.

She achieved the fastest run (100 metres) by a female para athlete in the T36 category which was 13.68 seconds on 20 July 2017 at the World Para Athletics Championships held in London, UK.
