= Danielle Aitchison =

New Zealand Paralympic athlete

Personal information
- Born: 16 August 2001 (age 25) Morrinsville, New Zealand

Sport
- Country: New Zealand
- Sport: Para-athletics
- Disability: Cerebral palsy
- Disability class: T36
- Club: Hamilton City Hawks Athletics
Medal record
Women's para-athletics
Representing New Zealand
Paralympic Games
Silver medal – second place	2020 Tokyo	200m T36
Silver medal – second place	2024 Paris	100 m T36
Silver medal – second place	2024 Paris	200 m T36
Bronze medal – third place	2020 Tokyo	100m T36
World Championships
Gold medal – first place	2023 Paris	200m T36
Gold medal – first place	2024 Kobe	200m T36
Gold medal – first place	2025 New Delhi	100m T36
Gold medal – first place	2025 New Delhi	200m T36
Silver medal – second place	2019 Dubai	200m T36
Silver medal – second place	2024 Kobe	100m T36

Danielle Aitchison (born 16 August 2001) is a New Zealand para-athlete. She competes in the 100 metres and 200 metres in international events. She won a gold medal with a new Oceania record in the women’s 200-metre T36 at the 2023 World Para Athletics Championships in Paris, France in July 2023.

== Personal life ==
Aitchison was born in Morrinsville in 2001 and grew up in Patetonga in the Hauraki District. She attended Kaihere School. She was born with severe jaundice, cerebral palsy and 80-90% hearing loss. She has two uncommon types of cerebral palsy: athetoid and ataxia. She has cochlear implants in both ears. While growing up Aitchison participated in ballet, netball and hockey.

== Career ==
Aitchison began competing in para-athletics at age 16 in 2017, at the Halberg Junior Disability Games in Auckland, New Zealand. She has competed in long jump and won a national title in the event.

In 2019 she represented New Zealand internationally for the first time at the 2019 World Para Athletics Championships in Dubai, United Arab Emirates. She finished fourth in the 100m event and won silver in the 200m event with an Oceania record time (29.86sec).

Competing at the 2020 Summer Paralympics in the women's 200 metres T36, Aitchison finished fastest in her heat. In the final, Aitchison won silver with a time of 29.88. She also won bronze in the women's 100 metres T36.

Awards
Preceded by Anna Grimaldi	Halberg Awards; Para Athlete or Para Team of the Year; 2025	Incumbent
