= Brianna Coop =

Australian Paralympic athlete (born 1998)

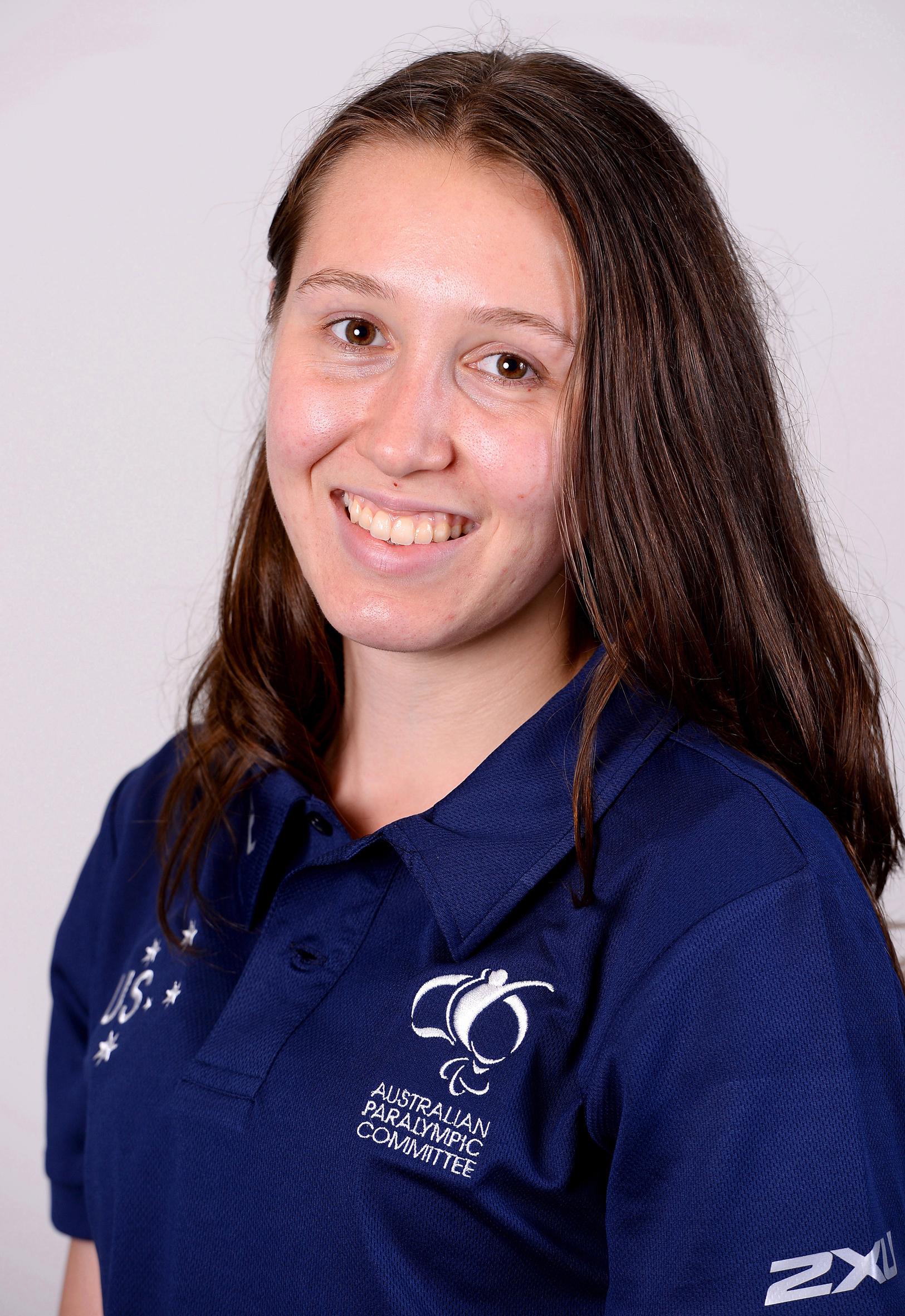
- 2016 Australian Paralympic team portrait

Personal information
- Full name: Brianna Coop
- Nationality: Australian
- Born: 19 February 1998 (age 28) Cairns, Queensland

Sport
- Disability class: T35
Medal record
Women's para athletics
Representing Australia
World Championships
| Bronze medal – third place | 2015 Doha | 100 m T35 |
Commonwealth Games
| Bronze medal – third place | 2018 Gold Coast | 100 m T35 |

Brianna Coop (born 19 February 1998) is a Paralympic athlete from Australia competing in T35 sprint events. She represented Australia at the 2016 Rio Paralympics in athletics.

== Personal ==
Coop was born on 19 February 1998 in Cairns, Queensland. She was diagnosed with cerebral palsy in 2006. She attended Gordonvale State School in Gordonvale, Queensland. While there in 2013, she qualified for the national junior disability championships for the 100m, 200m, and discus throwing. Coop won bronze in the 100m and 200m, finishing fourth in the discus as well. She later attended Ryan Catholic College in Townsville, Queensland.

== Career ==
Coop competes in the T35 classification of athletics. At her first major international competition, 2015 IPC Athletics World Championships in Doha, she won the bronze medal in the Women's 100m T35. In the Women's 200m T35, she finished fourth. Both events were won by fellow Australian Isis Holt. At the 2016 Rio Paralympics, Coop placed fourth overall in the 100 m T35 with a time of 15.56. She also came fifth in the 200 m T35 with a time of 33.08.

At the 2017 World Para Athletics Championships in London, England, she finished fourth in the Women's 100m and 200m T35 events.

She is coached by Wayne Leaver.
