= Claudia Nicoleitzik =

German Paralympic athlete

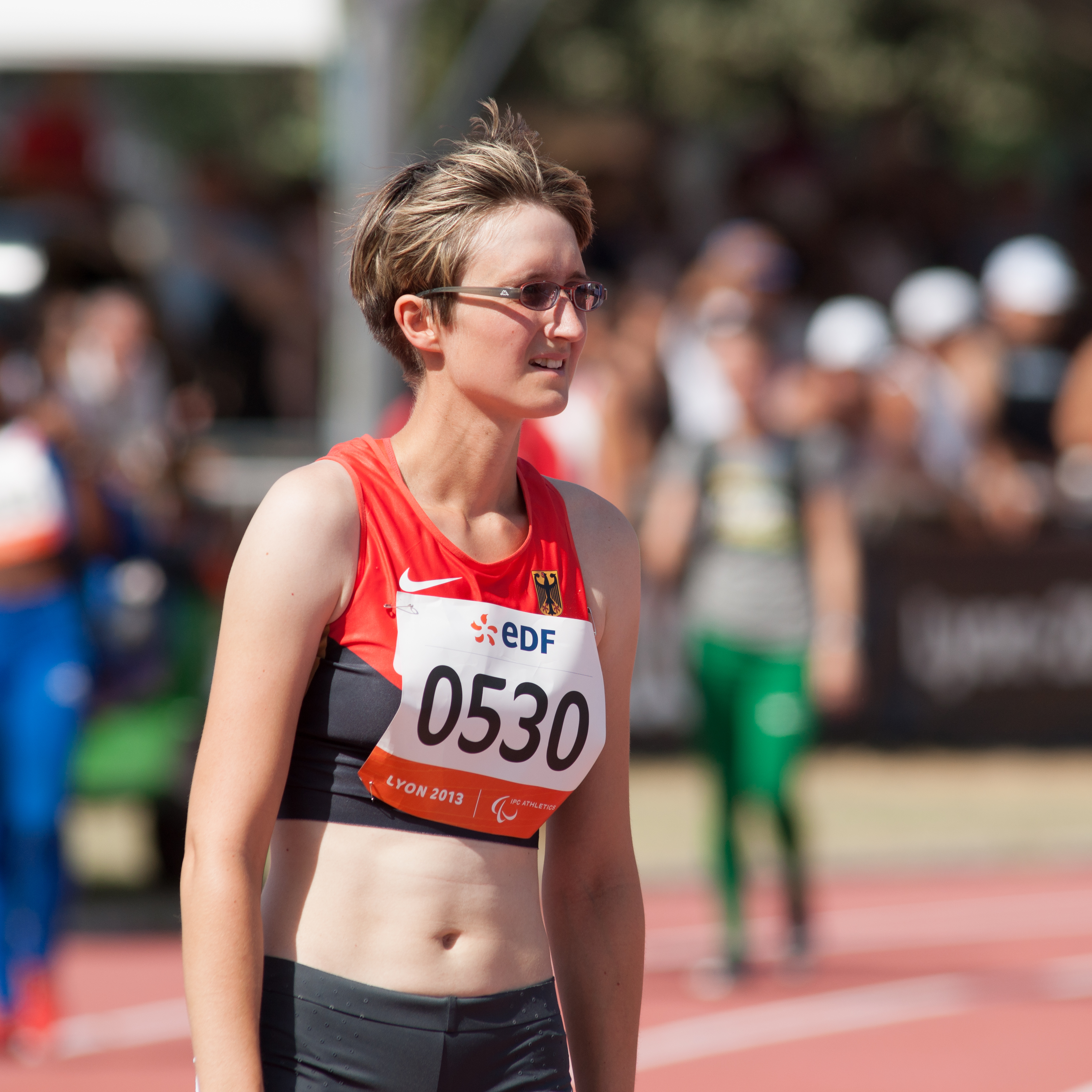
- Nicoleitzik at the 2013 IPC Athletics World Championships

Personal information
- Born: 8 December 1989 (age 36)
Medal record
Women's para athletics (T36)
Representing Germany
Paralympic Games
Silver medal – second place	2008 Beijing	100m – T36
Silver medal – second place	2008 Beijing	200m – T36
Bronze medal – third place	2012 London	200m – T36
Bronze medal – third place	2016 Rio de Janeiro	200m – T36
World Championships
Gold medal – first place	2013 Lyon	100m – T36
Silver medal – second place	2013 Lyon	200m – T36
Silver medal – second place	2015 Doha	200m – T36
Bronze medal – third place	2011 Christchurch	100m – T36
Bronze medal – third place	2015 Doha	100m – T36
European Championships
Gold medal – first place	2014 Swansea	200m – T36
Silver medal – second place	2012 Stadskanaal	4 × 100 m- T35–38
Silver medal – second place	2014 Swansea	100m – T36

Claudia Nicoleitzik (born 8 December 1989) is a Paralympian athlete from Germany competing mainly in category T36 sprint events.

She competed in the 2008 Summer Paralympics in Beijing, and the 2012 Summer Paralympics in London. In 2008 she won a silver medal in the women's 100 metres – T36 event and a silver medal in the women's 200 metres – T36 event. In 2012 she won a bronze medal in the women's 200 metres – T36 event.
