= Zhou Xia =

Chinese para-athlete (b. 1998/1999)

Personal information
- Nationality: China
- Born: 12 July 1999 (age 26) Huaihua

Sport
- Sport: Para-athletics
- Disability class: T35
- Event: Sprints
Medal record
Women's athletics T35
Representing China
Paralympic Games
Gold medal – first place	2016 Rio de Janeiro	100 m T35
Gold medal – first place	2016 Rio de Janeiro	200 m T35
Gold medal – first place	2020 Tokyo	100 m T35
Gold medal – first place	2020 Tokyo	200 m T35
Gold medal – first place	2024 Paris	100 m T35
Gold medal – first place	2024 Paris	200 m T35
World Championships
Gold medal – first place	2023 Paris	100 m T35
Gold medal – first place	2023 Paris	200 m T35
Gold medal – first place	2024 Kobe	100 m T35
Gold medal – first place	2024 Kobe	200 m T35
Silver medal – second place	2017 London	100 m T35
Silver medal – second place	2017 London	200 m T35
Asian Para Games
Gold medal – first place	2018 Jakarta	100 m T35
Gold medal – first place	2018 Jakarta	200 m T35
Gold medal – first place	2022 Hangzhou	100 m T35
Gold medal – first place	2022 Hangzhou	200 m T35

Zhou Xia (born 12 July 1999) is a Chinese para-athlete who competes in sprint events. She won two gold medals at the 2016 Summer Paralympics, in the T35 100 m and 200 m races. At the 2020 Summer Paralympics, she won two gold medals in the T35 100m race and T35 200m, setting a new world record in both event.

== Career ==
Zhou competed at the 2016 Summer Paralympics in Rio de Janeiro, when she was 17 years old. She won the T35 100 m (ahead of Australia's Isis Holt and Britain's Maria Lyle) and set a Paralympics record for the event with a time of 13.66s. She also won gold in the T35 200 m event with a world record time of 28.22s.

Zhou competed in the IPC Athletics World Championships in London in 2014. She won the silver medal in both the 100 m and 200 m events, behind Isis Holt.

Zhou competed in the 2020 Summer Paralympics in Tokyo. She won the T35 100 m in a world record time of 13.00s. She also won the T35 200 m in a world record time of 27.17s.
