= Elena Sviridova =

Russian Paralympic athlete

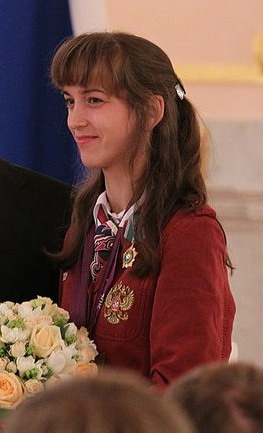
- Sviridova meeting President Putin in 2012

Personal information
- Born: 2 April 1988 (age 38) Yoshkar-Ola, Russia
- Height: 167 cm (66 in)

Sport
- Country: Russia
- Sport: Athletics
- Disability class: T36
- Event: sprint
- Club: Rostov Centre of Olympic Preparation
- Coached by: Nikolay Romanov
Medal record
Track and field (T36)
Paralympic Games
Representing RPC
Silver medal – second place	2020 Tokyo	100m – T36
Representing Russia
Gold medal – first place	2012 London	100m – T36
Gold medal – first place	2012 London	200m – T36
Gold medal – first place	2012 London	100m relay – T35–38
World Championships
Gold medal – first place	2011 Christchurch	100m – T36
Gold medal – first place	2011 Christchurch	200m – T36
Silver medal – second place	2011 Christchurch	100m relay – T35–38
Gold medal – first place	2015 Doha	100m – T36
Gold medal – first place	2015 Doha	200m – T36
Silver medal – second place	2015 Doha	100m relay – T35–38
European Championships
Gold medal – first place	2012 Stadskanaal	100m – T36
Gold medal – first place	2012 Stadskanaal	200m – T36

Elena Sviridova (née Ivanova; born 2 April 1988) is a Paralympian athlete from Russia competing mainly in category T36 sprint events.

Sviridova competed at the 2012 Summer Paralympics in London, where she won three gold medals, in the 100m and 200m sprint, and the women's T35–38 100m sprint relay. As well as her Paralympic success Sviridova has been dominant in her field during the World Championships winning gold in both the 100m and 200m sprints at the 2011 and 2015 Games.

== Personal history ==
Sviridova was born Elena Ivanova in Yoshkar-Ola in the former Soviet Union in 1988. Sviridova studied economics at Saint Petersburg State University of Economics and Finance. She is married to fellow Russian Paralympic athlete Vladimir Sviridov, and they have a son, who was born in 2013. Sviridova has cerebral palsy.
