= Fatimah Suwaed =

Iraqi Paralympic athlete (born 2007)

Personal information
- Nationality: Iraqi
- Born: 3 March 2007 (age 19) Baghdad, Iraq

Sport
- Sport: Paralympic athletics
- Disability: Cerebral palsy
- Disability class: T35
- Event: Sprints
Medal record
Women's para-athletics
Representing Iraq
World Championships
Silver medal – second place	2025 New Delhi	200 m T35
Bronze medal – third place	2025 New Delhi	100 m T35
Asian Para Games
Bronze medal – third place	2022 Hangzhou	100 m T35
Bronze medal – third place	2022 Hangzhou	200 m T35

Fatimah Suwaed (born 3 March 2007) is an Iraqi Paralympic athlete. She made her Paralympic debut during the 2020 Summer Paralympics.

== Career ==
She represented Iraq at the 2020 Summer Paralympics and competed in both women's 100m T35 and women's 200m T35 events. Competing at the age of 14, she became the youngest ever athlete from Iraq to compete at the Paralympics.
