= Deja Young =

American Paralympic athlete

Personal information
- Born: June 10, 1996 (age 30) Dallas, Texas, U.S.
- Height: 1.67 m (5 ft 6 in)

Sport
- Country: United States
- Sport: Paralympic athletics
- Disability: Brachial plexus
- Disability class: T46
- Club: Wichita State University
Medal record
Women's paralympic athletics
Representing United States
Paralympic Games
Gold medal – first place	2016 Rio de Janeiro	100m T46
Gold medal – first place	2016 Rio de Janeiro	200m T46
Bronze medal – third place	2020 Tokyo	100m T47
IPC/World Para Championships
Gold medal – first place	2015 Doha	100m T47
Silver medal – second place	2015 Doha	200m T47
Gold medal – first place	2017 London	100m T47
Gold medal – first place	2017 London	200m T47
Parapan American Games
Gold medal – first place	2019 Lima	100m T47
Gold medal – first place	2019 Lima	200m T47

Deja Young (born June 10, 1996) is an American Paralympic athlete from Dallas, Texas. She participates in the T46 sprinting events.

== Biography ==
Deja Young is the youngest daughter of Don and Delora Young, and she has an older sister named Dyani. She was born with brachial plexus, or shoulder dystocia, which has caused nerve damage and limited mobility in her right shoulder. This was caused during childbirth by a panicked doctor who pulled on her head too hard, causing her right shoulder to dislocate. She had to undergo three surgeries to reduce her discomfort.

== Sporting career ==
Young was a standout volleyball and softball player in high school. However, her disability hindered her performance, and she decided to do track and field athletics. When she took part in track events as a freshman, she discovered speed, and has been interested from then on. Young has been an athlete in two Missouri Valley Conference championship teams in 60m and 100m events, and was also a relay team participant in Wichita State's 400m relay as a freshman and junior.

Young participated in her first international athletics event in 2015 in Doha, Qatar. She won her first gold medal in the 100 meters by five-tenths of a second, defeating silver medalist Wang Yanping and bronze medalist Alicja Fiodorow. In the 200m final, Young won a silver medal after being beaten by Cuban athlete Yunidis Castillo by half a second.
