= Jeon Min-jae =

South Korean Paralympic athlete

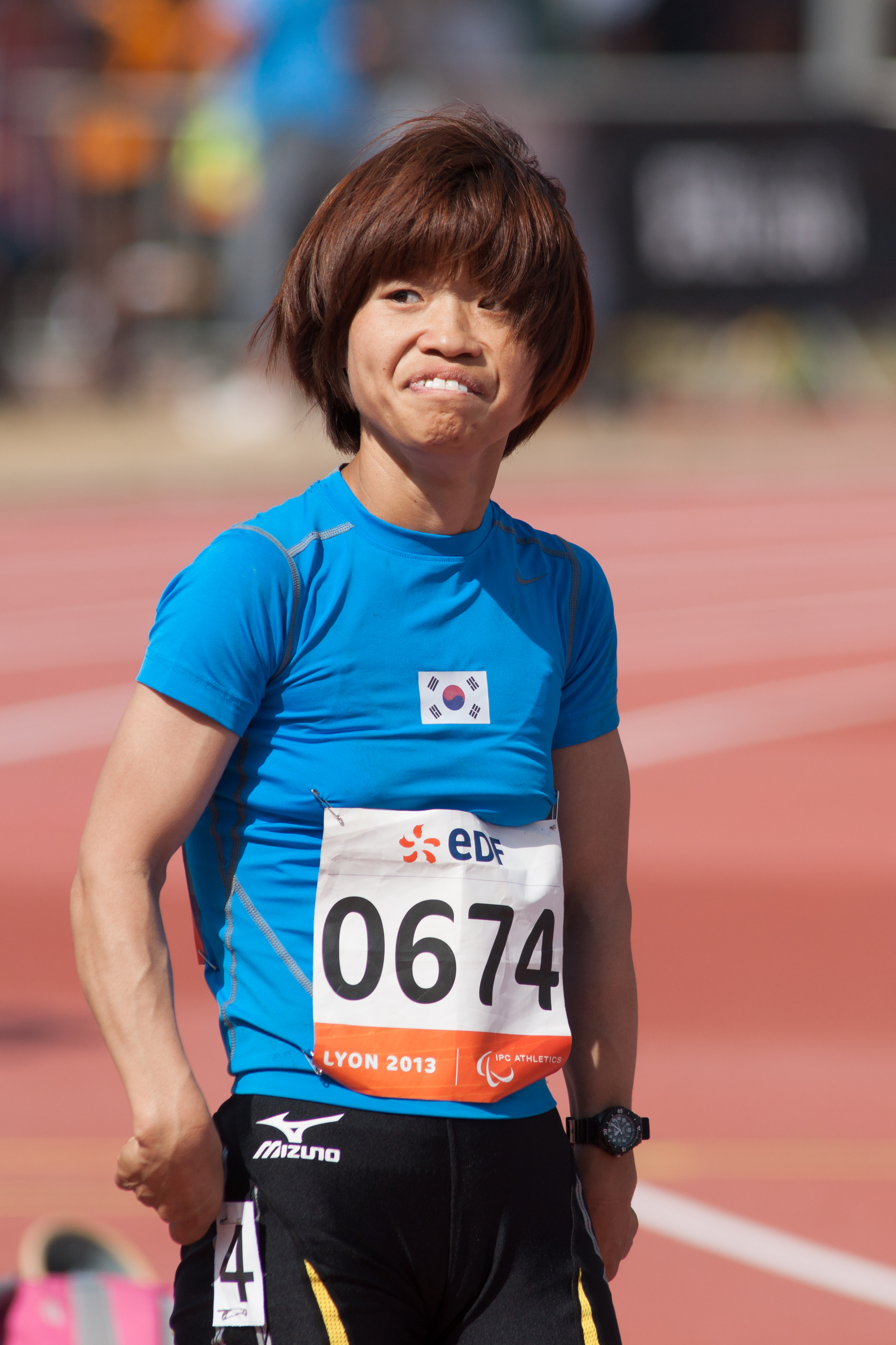
- Jeon at the 2013 World Championships in Lyon

Personal information
- Born: 12 July 1977 (age 48)
- Height: 146 cm (57 in)

Sport
- Country: South Korea
- Sport: Athletics
- Disability class: T36
- Event: sprint
- Club: Jeonbuk Spike Athletics Club
- Coached by: Kim Sang-Hyeon
Medal record
Paralympic athletics
Representing South Korea
Paralympic Games
Silver medal – second place	2016 Rio de Janeiro	200m – T36
Silver medal – second place	2012 London	100m – T36
Silver medal – second place	2012 London	200m – T36
World Championships
Gold medal – first place	2013 Lyon	200m – T36
Silver medal – second place	2013 Lyon	100m – T36
Asian Para Games
Gold medal – first place	2014 Incheon	100m – T36
Gold medal – first place	2014 Incheon	200m – T36
Gold medal – first place	2018 Jakarta	100m – T36
Gold medal – first place	2018 Jakarta	200m – T36
Silver medal – second place	2010 Guangzhou	100m – T36
Silver medal – second place	2010 Guangzhou	200m – T36
Silver medal – second place	2022 Hangzhou	100m – T36
Silver medal – second place	2022 Hangzhou	200m – T36

Jeon Min-jae (Korean: 전민재; born 12 July 1977) is a South Korean Paralympic athlete competing mainly in category T36 sprint events.

== Career ==
Jeon first competed at a Paralympics in Beijing in 2008, where she entered both the 100m and 200m sprints, finishing 6th and 4th respectively. Four years later at the 2012 Summer Paralympics in London, she won silver in the 100m and 200m finals, finishing behind Russia's Elena Sviridova in both. As well as her Paralympic success Jeon has won medals at both World Championships and the Asian Para Games, winning the 100m and 200m at both the Asian Para Games in 2014 and 2018.

== Personal life ==
Jeon was born in South Korea in 1977. At the age of five she suffered from encephalitis, which resulted in her acquiring cerebral palsy.
