= Cheyenne Bouthoorn =

Dutch Paralympic athlete

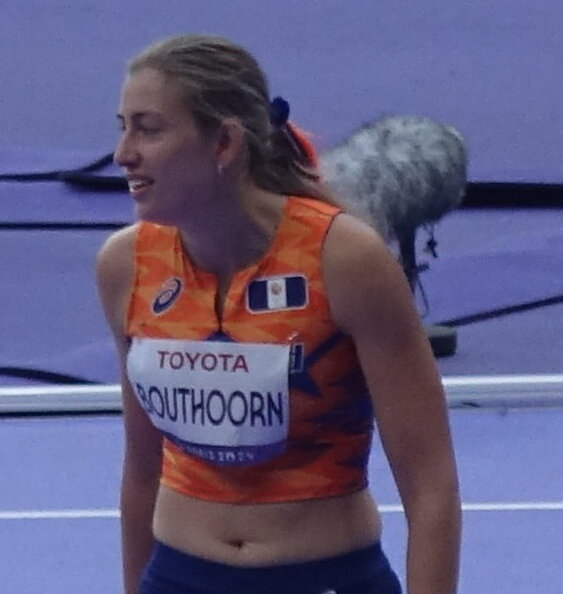
- Bouthoorn at the 2024 Summer Paralympics

Personal information
- Nationality: Dutch
- Born: 8 December 1997 (age 28) Almere, Netherlands

Sport
- Country: Netherlands
- Sport: Paralympic athletics
- Disability class: T36, F36
- Event(s): 100 metres 200 metres Shot put
Medal record
Women's para-athletics
Representing Netherlands
World Championships
Gold medal – first place	2025 New Delhi	Shot put F36
Bronze medal – third place	2025 New Delhi	200m T36
European Championships
Gold medal – first place	2021 Bydgoszcz	100m T36
Silver medal – second place	2021 Bydgoszcz	Shot put F36
Bronze medal – third place	2021 Bydgoszcz	200m T36

Cheyenne Bouthoorn (born 8 December 1997) is a Dutch para athlete who competes in shot put and sprinting events at international elite competitions. She is a European multi-medalist in both of her events. She also competed at the 2020 Summer Paralympics in Tokyo, Japan.
