= Nicole Nicoleitzik =

German Paralympic athlete

Personal information
- Born: 1 August 1995 (age 30) Saarlouis, Germany

Sport
- Country: Germany
- Sport: Paralympic athletics
- Disability: Ataxia
- Disability class: T38
- Coached by: Evi Raubach
Medal record
Paralympic athletics
Representing Germany
World Championships
Bronze medal – third place	2023 Paris	200m T36
European Championships
Gold medal – first place	2018 Berlin	200m T36
Silver medal – second place	2021 Bydgoszcz	100m T36
Silver medal – second place	2021 Bydgoszcz	200m T36

Nicole Nicoleitzik (born 1 August 1995) is a German Paralympic athlete who competes in sprint and long jump events.

== Personal life ==
She is the younger sister of Claudia Nicoleitzik.
