= Jagoda Kibil =

Polish Paralympic athlete (born 1999)

Personal information
- Born: 15 August 1999 (age 26) Kozienice, Poland
- Home town: Kozienice, Poland
- Height: 1.70 m (5 ft 7 in)

Sport
- Country: Poland
- Sport: Para athletics
- Disability: Cerebral palsy
- Disability class: T35
- Event(s): 100 metres 200 metres
- Club: START Radom
- Coached by: Jacek Szczygieł
Medal record
Para athletics
Representing Poland
World Championships
Silver medal – second place	2019 Dubai	Women's 200m T35
European Championships
Gold medal – first place	2018 Berlin	Women's 200m T35
Bronze medal – third place	2016 Grosseto	Women's 100m T35
Bronze medal – third place	2016 Grosseto	Women's 200m T35

Jagoda Kibil (born 15 August 1999) is a Polish Paralympic athlete who competes in sprinting events in international level events. Her twin brother Daniel Kibil is also a Paralympic athlete who competes at national level.

She and her twin brother suffered cerebral hypoxia due to complications at birth which caused them both to have cerebral palsy.
