= Isis Holt =

Australian Paralympic athlete

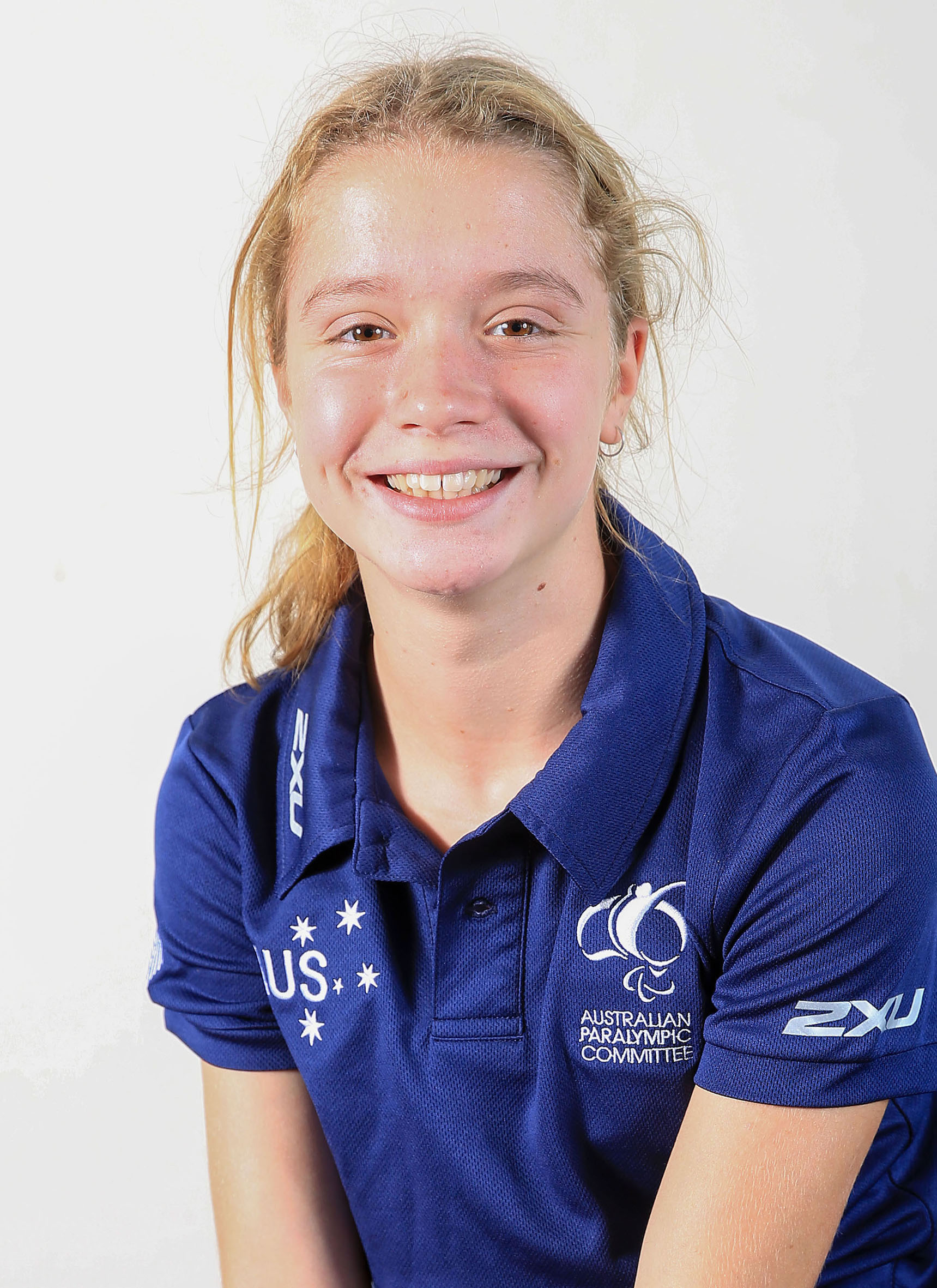
- 2016 Australian Paralympic team portrait

Personal information
- Nationality: Australian
- Born: 3 July 2001 (age 24) Canberra, Australian Capital Territory

Sport
- Club: Old Xaverians Athletics Club
Medal record
Women's athletics T35
Representing Australia
Paralympic Games
Silver medal – second place	2016 Rio de Janeiro	100 m T35
Silver medal – second place	2016 Rio de Janeiro	200 m T35
Silver medal – second place	2020 Tokyo	100 m T35
Silver medal – second place	2020 Tokyo	200 m T35
Bronze medal – third place	2016 Rio de Janeiro	4×100 m relay T35-38
IPC Athletics World Championships
Gold medal – first place	2015 Doha	100 m T35
Gold medal – first place	2015 Doha	200 m T35
Gold medal – first place	2017 London	100 m T35
Gold medal – first place	2017 London	200 m T35
Commonwealth Games
Gold medal – first place	2018 Gold Coast	100 m T35

Isis Holt (born 3 July 2001) is an Australian Paralympic athlete competing in T35 sprint events. She is affected by the condition cerebral palsy. Holt won gold medals in the 100 m and 200 m at the 2015 and 2017 World Para Athletics Championships. At the 2016 Rio Paralympics, she won two silver medals and a bronze medal and 2020 Tokyo Paralympics, two silver medals.

== Personal life ==
Holt was born on 3 July 2001 with cerebral palsy, which affects both sides of her body. She attended Brunswick Secondary College. She previously attended Melbourne Girls Grammar.

== Athletics ==
Holt took up athletics in 2014. At the 2015 IPC Athletics World Championships in Doha in her first major overseas competition, she won gold medals in world record time in two events: Women's 100m T35 (13.63 (w: +2.0) world record) and the Women's 200m T35 (28.57 (w: +1.5 world record). At the IPC Athletics Grand Prix in Canberra on 7 February 2016, she smashed her 200m T35 world record by running 28.38 (w: +0.2). At the 2016 Australian Athletics Championships in Sydney, she broke world records in winning the 100m and 200m Ambulant events.

At the 2016 Rio Paralympics, she won silver medals in the Women's 100 m T35 and Women's 200 m T25 and a bronze medal in the Women's 4 × 100 m Relay T35-38.

At the 2017 World Para Athletics Championships in London, she won gold medals in the Women's 100 m T35 and Women's 200 m T35. In winning the 100 m, she broke the world record with a time of 13.43. This time broke the world record she previously held by 0.14 seconds By winning the 100 m and 200 m, Holt defended titles won at the 2015 World Championships. Two weeks prior to leaving for the World Championships, she was hospitalised with tonsillitis.

After the Rio Paralympics, Holt moved to Queensland to be coached by Paul Pearce. At the 2018 Commonwealth Games, Gold Coast, Queensland, she won the gold medal in the Women's 100m T35.

At the 2020 Tokyo Paralympics, Holt won the silver medal in the Women's 100 m T35 in a personal best time of 13.13. She also won silver in the Women's 200 m T35, setting a new Oceania record with a run of 27.94.

=== World records ===
Distance	Time	Location	Date
Women's 200m T35	29.49	Brisbane	29 March 2015
Women's 100m T35	13.63 (w: +2.0)	Doha	29 October 2015
Women's 200m T35	28.57 (w: +1.5)	Doha	24 October 2015
Women's 200m T35	28.38 (w: +0.2)	Canberra	7 February 2016
Women's 100m T35	13.57 (w: -0.8)	Sydney	1 April 2016
Women's 200m T35	28.30 (w: +1.1)	Sydney	3 April 2016
Women's 100m T35	13.43 (+0.9)	London	19 July 2017
Women's 100m T35	13.37 (+0.8)	Gold Coast, Queensland	17 February 2018
Women's 100m T35	13.36 (+0.5)	Sydney	17 March 2018

Her philosophy is "My ability is bigger than my disability." She was coached in Melbourne by Nick Wall for 2016 Rio Paralympics and by Paul Pearce in Brisbane for the 2020 Tokyo Paralympics.

In November 2022, Holt announced her retirement to pursue a career in psychology.

== Recognition ==
- 2015 Victorian Junior Athlete of the Year
- 2015 Athletics Australia Female Para-athlete of the Year
- 2016 Athletics Australia Female Para-athlete of the Year
- 2017 Victorian Disability Sport and Recreation Awards – Deakin University Female Sportsperson of the Year
- 2017 Victorian Institute of Sport 2XU Youth Award
- 2017 Athletics Australia Female Para-athlete of the Year
