= Oxana Corso =

Italian Paralympic athlete

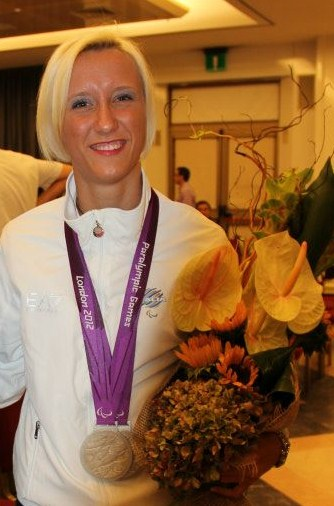

Personal information
- Nationality: Italian
- Born: 9 July 1995 (age 31) Saint Petersburg, Russia

Sport
- Sport: Paralympic athletics
- Disability: Cerebral palsy
- Disability class: T35
- Event: Sprints
- Club: Fiamme Gialle
- Coached by: Massimo Di Marcello

Achievements and titles
- Personal bests: 100 m: 14.91 (2016) NR; 200 m: 31.67 (2016) NR; 400 m: 1:14.69 (2016) WR
Medal record
Women's para athletics
Representing Italy
Event	1st	2nd	3rd
Paralympic Games	0	2	0
World Championships	2	1	2
European Championships	2	4	1
Total	4	7	3
Paralympic Games
Silver medal – second place	2012 London	100 m T35
Silver medal – second place	2012 London	200 m T35
World Championships
Gold medal – first place	2013 Lyon	100 m T35
Gold medal – first place	2013 Lyon	200 m T35
Silver medal – second place	2019 Dubai	100 m T35
Bronze medal – third place	2019 Dubai	200 m T35
Bronze medal – third place	2019 Dubai	200 m T35
European Championships
Gold medal – first place	2012 Stadskanaal	100 m T35
Gold medal – first place	2012 Stadskanaal	200 m T35
Silver medal – second place	2014 Swansea	100 m T35
Silver medal – second place	2014 Swansea	200 m T35
Silver medal – second place	2016 Grosseto	100 m T35
Silver medal – second place	2016 Grosseto	200 m T35
Bronze medal – third place	2018 Berlin	Universal relay

Oxana Corso (born 9 July 1995 in Saint Petersburg) is a Russian-born Italian Paralympic athlete. As of April 2014, she holds the Women's 400 metres world records for the T35 cerebral palsy classification. She won a silver medal at the 2012 Summer Paralympics, and competed at the 2020 Summer Paralympics, in 100m T35 and 200m T35.

== Biography ==
Oxana was born in Russia in 1995. She arrived in Italy when she was three years old and was adopted by the Corso family, of Rome. She has cerebral palsy.

She won two gold medals at the 2012 IPC Athletics European Championships. She competed at the 2013 Para World Championships, and 2018 IPC Athletics European Championships.

== Achievements ==
Year	Competition	Venue	Position	Event	Time	Notes
2012	European Championships	(Netherlands) Stadskanaal	1st	100 m T35	16.07	EU
2012	European Championships	(Netherlands) Stadskanaal	1st	200 m T35	33.78	EU
2012	Paralympic Games	(United Kingdom) London	2nd	100 m T35	15.94	EU
2012	Paralympic Games	(United Kingdom) London	2nd	200 m T35	33.68	EU
2013	World Championships	(France) Lyon	1st	100 m T35	15.63	WR
2013	World Championships	(France) Lyon	1st	200 m T35	33.42	
2014	European Championships	(United Kingdom) Swansea	2nd	100 m T35	16.51	
2014	European Championships	(United Kingdom) Swansea	2nd	200 m T35	34.37	
2015	World Championships	(Qatar) Doha	4th	100 m T35	15.14	
2015	World Championships	(Qatar) Doha	3rd	200 m T35	32.20	
2016	European Championships	(Italy) Grosseto	2nd	100 m T35	15.28	
2016	European Championships	(Italy) Grosseto	2nd	200 m T35	33.09	
2016	Paralympic Games	(Brazil) Rio de Janeiro	5th	100 m T35	15.67	
2016	Paralympic Games	(Brazil) Rio de Janeiro	6th	200 m T35	32.68	
2018	European Championships	(Germany) Berlin	5th	100 m T35	16.60	
2018	European Championships	(Germany) Berlin	3rd	Universal Relay	54.39	
2019	World Championships	(United Arab Emirates) Dubai	2nd	100 m T35	15.42	
2019	World Championships	(United Arab Emirates) Dubai	3rd	200 m T35	33.35	

== Records ==
Current holder

Class	Date	Venue	Event	Time	Record	Note
2009
T38		(Italy) Vigna di Valle	800 m	4:11.7		
2012
T37		(Italy) Rome	100 m	15.73		
T37		(Italy) Rieti	200 m	33.43		
T37		(Italy) Terni	400 m	1:17.93		
2013
T35		(France) Lyon	100 m	15.63		
T35		(Italy) Grosseto	200 m	33.19		
T35		(Italy) Grosseto	400 m	1:22.37		
2016
T35	9 April	(Italy) Grosseto	200 m	31.67		
T35	10 April	(Italy) Grosseto	100 m	14.91		
T35	7 May	(Italy) Rieti	400 m	1:14.69		

== See also ==
- List of IPC world records in athletics
- Italy at the 2012 Summer Paralympics
