= Yanina Martínez =

Argentinian Paralympic athlete

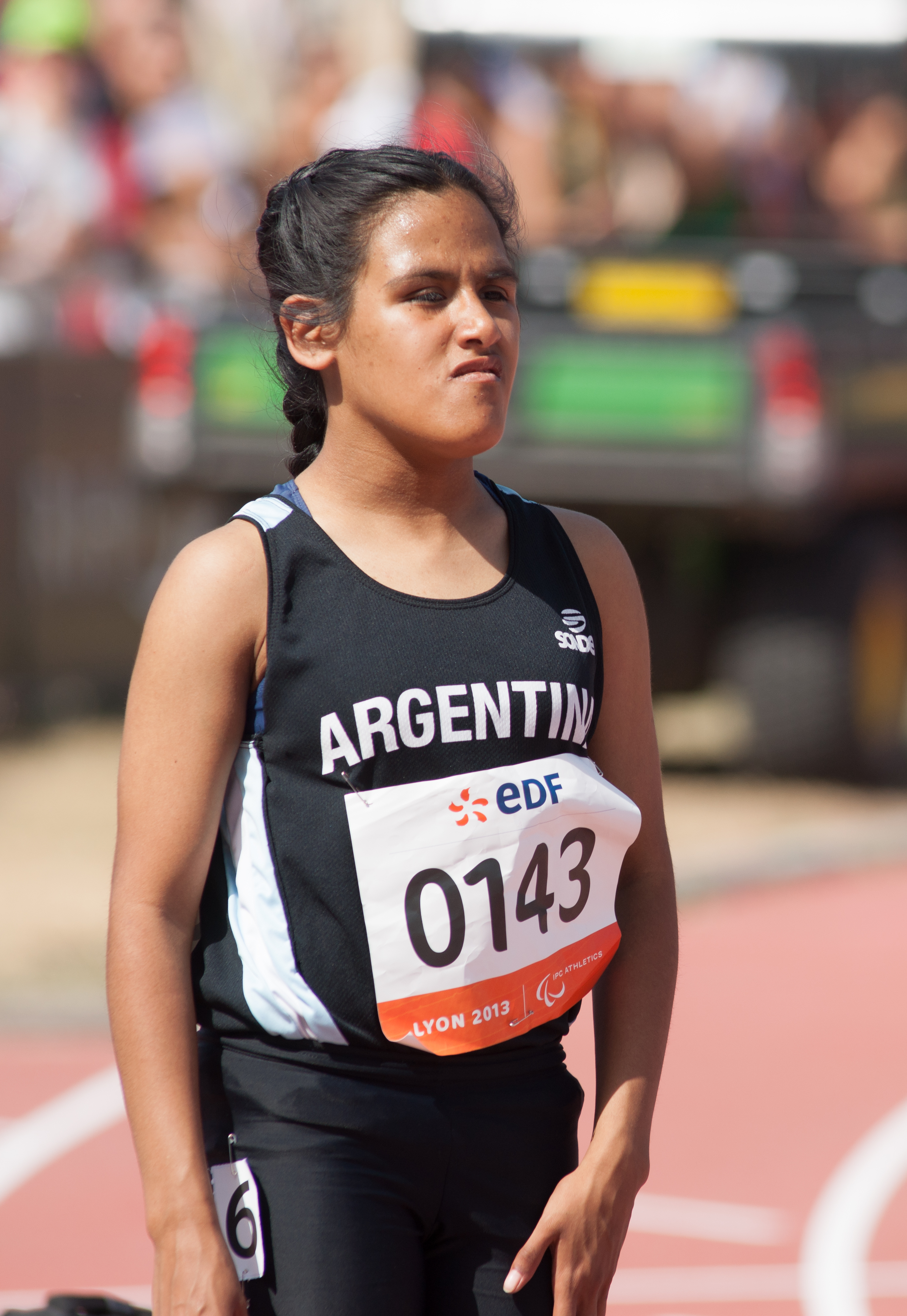
- Martinez at 2013 IPC Athletics World Championships

Personal information
- Nickname: Yani
- Born: 24 December 1993 (age 32) Rosario, Santa Fe, Argentina
- Height: 1.63 m (5 ft 4 in)

Sport
- Country: Argentina
- Sport: Paralympic athletics
- Disability: Cerebral palsy
- Disability class: T36
Medal record
Paralympic athletics
Representing Argentina
Paralympic Games
Gold medal – first place	2016 Rio de Janeiro	100m T36
Bronze medal – third place	2020 Tokyo	200m T36
World Championships
Silver medal – second place	2015 Doha	100m T36
Silver medal – second place	2017 London	100m T36
Silver medal – second place	2017 London	200m T36
Silver medal – second place	2019 Dubai	100m T36
Bronze medal – third place	2015 Doha	200m T36
Bronze medal – third place	2019 Dubai	200m T36
Parapan American Games
Gold medal – first place	2015 Toronto	100m T36
Gold medal – first place	2015 Toronto	200m T36
Gold medal – first place	2019 Lima	100m T36
Gold medal – first place	2019 Lima	200m T36
Silver medal – second place	2011 Guadalajara	100m T36
Silver medal – second place	2011 Guadalajara	200m T36
Bronze medal – third place	2023 Santiago	200m T36

Yanina Andrea Martinez (born December 24, 1993) is a sprinter who won gold for Argentina at the 2016 Summer Paralympics in the women's 100 meters. She qualified for the 2020 Summer Paralympics, in 100m T36, and 200m T36.

== Career ==
She competed at the 2015 Parapan American Games winning a gold medal in T36 100m and 200m, and at the 2016 Paralympic Games winning a gold medal in T36 100m.
