= T36 (classification) =

Para-athletics classification

T36 is a disability sport classification for disability athletics. It includes people who have coordination impairments such as hypertonia, ataxia and athetosis. It includes people with cerebral palsy. T36 is used by the International Paralympic Committee. This classification competes at the Paralympic Games.

== Definition ==
This classification is for disability athletics. This classification is one of eight classifications for athletes with cerebral palsy; four for wheelchair athletes (T31, T32, T33, T34) and four for ambulant ones (T35, T36, T37 and T38). Jane Buckley, writing for the Sporting Wheelies, describes the athletes in this classification as: "CP6, see CP-ISRA classes (appendix) Ambulant " The classification in the appendix by Buckley goes on to say "These athletes do not have the capacity to remain still and they show involuntary movements with all four limbs affected. They usually walk without assistive devices" The Australian Paralympic Committee defines this classification as being for "Athetoid or Ataxic - Moderate involvement. Ambulates without walking devices." The International Paralympic Committee defined this classification on their website in July 2016 as, "Coordination impairments (hypertonia, ataxia and athetosis)".

== Disability groups ==
Multiple types of disabilities are eligible to compete in this class. This class includes people who have cerebral palsy, or who have had a stroke or traumatic brain injury.

=== Cerebral palsy ===
==== CP6 ====
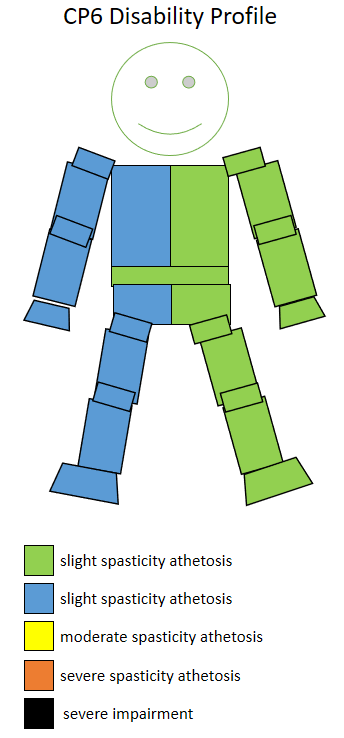
The spasticity athetosis level and location of a CP6 sportsperson.

CP6 sportspeople are able to walk without the need for an assistive device. They lack coordination in all their limbs, with the greater lack of coordination involving their upper body. Their bodies are often in motion, and they cannot maintain a still state. While CP2, CP3 and CP6 have similar issues with Athetoid or Ataxic, CP6 competitors have "flight" while they are ambulant in that it is possible for both feet to not be touching the ground while walking. CP2 and CP3 are unable to do this. In athletics, CP6 competitors have some balance issues in track events and field events that require either running or throwing. Their form in running is often better than their form while walking.

== Rules and performance ==
Athletes in this class are not required to use a starting block. It is up to the individual. They have the option to start from a crouch, from a standing position or 3 point stance. T36 sportspeople are more prone to being deaf than other classes in the T30s. As a result, officials should be prepared to use a flag or strobe light to start a race if anyone in a race is deaf. They also have an option to have an assistant tap a runner when the starting gun goes off as an alternative.

In track events, officials are encouraged to avoid keeping these athletes in the starting block too long. Because of these issues, athletes may make movements that normally would disqualify them as a false start. If an official believes movement could be a result of this, they can restart the entire field without disqualifying any runners.

== History ==
The classification was created by the International Paralympic Committee and has roots in a 2003 attempt to address "the overall objective to support and co-ordinate the ongoing development of accurate, reliable, consistent and credible sport focused classification systems and their implementation."

For the 2016 Summer Paralympics in Rio, the International Paralympic Committee had a zero classification at the Games policy. This policy was put into place in 2014, with the goal of avoiding last minute changes in classes that would negatively impact athlete training preparations. All competitors needed to be internationally classified with their classification status confirmed prior to the Games, with exceptions to this policy being dealt with on a case-by-case basis. In case there was a need for classification or reclassification at the Games despite best efforts otherwise, athletics classification was scheduled for September 4 and September 5 at Olympic Stadium. For sportspeople with physical or intellectual disabilities going through classification or reclassification in Rio, their in-competition observation event is their first appearance in competition at the Games.

== Governance ==
Classification into this class is handled by the International Paralympic Committee. For national events, classification is handled by the national athletics organization.

== Becoming classified ==
Athletes with cerebral palsy or similar impairments who wish to compete in para-athletics competition must first undergo a classification assessment. During this, they both undergo a bench test of muscle coordination and demonstrate their skills in athletics, such as running, jumping or throwing. A determination is then made as to what classification an athlete should compete in. Classifications may be Confirmed or Review status. For athletes who do not have access to a full classification panel, Provisional classification is available; this is a temporary Review classification, considered an indication of class only, and generally used only in lower levels of competition.

== Competitors ==
Notable T36 athletes include Mohamad Ridzuan Mohamad Puzi (MAS), Roman Pavlyk (UKR), Graeme Ballard (GBR), Ben Rushgrove (GBR), Paul Blake (GBR), James Turner (AUS), Evgenii Shvetcov (RUS), Fang Wang (CHN), Elena Ivanova (RUS), Claudia Nicoleitzik (GER), Natalie Schaus (ARG) and Min Jae Jeon (KOR). Katherine Proudfoot, now a notable F36 field athlete, also holds T36 Australian records on the track.

== See also ==
- Para-athletics classification
- Athletics at the Summer Paralympics
- Athletics at the 2008 Summer Paralympics – Men's 100 metres T36
- Athletics at the 2008 Summer Paralympics – Men's 200 metres T36
- Athletics at the 2008 Summer Paralympics – Men's 400 metres T36
- Athletics at the 2008 Summer Paralympics – Men's 800 metres T36
- Athletics at the 2008 Summer Paralympics – Women's 100 metres T36
- Athletics at the 2008 Summer Paralympics – Women's 200 metres T36
