= Athletics at the 2024 Summer Paralympics – Men's long jump =

Event at the 2024 Summer Paralympics

Athletics – Men's long jump at the XVII Paralympic Games
- Venue: Stade de France
- Dates: 30 August – 7 September 2024
- No. of events: 10

The Men's long jump athletics events for the 2024 Summer Paralympics took place at the Stade de France from August 29 to September 6, 2024. A total of 10 events were contested in this discipline. All the long jump events were straight finals.

== Schedule ==
R	Round 1	½	Semifinals	F	Final

Date	Fri 30		Sat 31		Sun 1		Mon 2		Tue 3		Wed 4		Thu 5		Fri 6		Sat 7	
Event	M	E	M	E	M	E	M	E	M	E	M	E	M	E	M	E	M	E
T11		F																
T12							F											
T13																	F	
T20																		F
T36								F										
T37													F					
T38											F							
T47									F									
T63				F														
T64												F						

== Medal summary ==
The following is a summary of the medals awarded across all long jump events.

Classification	Gold		Silver		Bronze	
T11	Di Dongdong; China	6.85 WR	Chen Shichang; China	6.50	Joan Munar Martinez; Spain	6.32
T12	Said Najafzade; Azerbaijan	7.27	Doniyor Saliev; Uzbekistan	716 SB	Fernando Vazquez; Argentina	6.88
T13	Orkhan Aslanov; Azerbaijan	7.29 SB	Isaac Jean-Paul; United States	7.20 SB	Paulo Henrique Andrade dos Reis; Brazil	7.20 PB
T20	Matvei Iakushev; Neutral Paralympic Athletes	7.51 AR	Abdul Latif Romly; Malaysia	7.45 SB	Jhon Obando; Colombia	7.38 AR
T36	Evgenii Torsunov; Neutral Paralympic Athletes	5.83 PR	Aser Ramos; Brazil	5.76	Oleksandr Lytvynenko; Ukraine	5.76 PB
T37	Brian Lionel Impellizzeri; Argentina	6.42	Samson Opiyo; Kenya	6.20 AR	Mateus Evangelista Cardoso; Brazil	6.20 SB
T38	Khetag Khinchagov; Neutral Paralympic Athletes	6.52	Zhong Huanghao; China	6.50 =SB	José Lemos; Colombia	6.40 SB
T47	Robiel Yankiel Sol Cervantes; Cuba	7.41	Wang Hao; China	7.32 SB	Nikita Kotukov; Neutral Paralympic Athletes	7.05
T63	Joel de Jong; Netherlands	7.68 WR	Daniel Wagner; Denmark	7.39 PB	Noah Mbuyamba; Netherlands	7.01 PB
T64	Markus Rehm; Germany	8.13	Derek Loccident; United States	7.79	Jarryd Wallace; United States	7.49

== Results ==
=== T11 ===
Men's long jump T11 at the XVII Paralympic Games
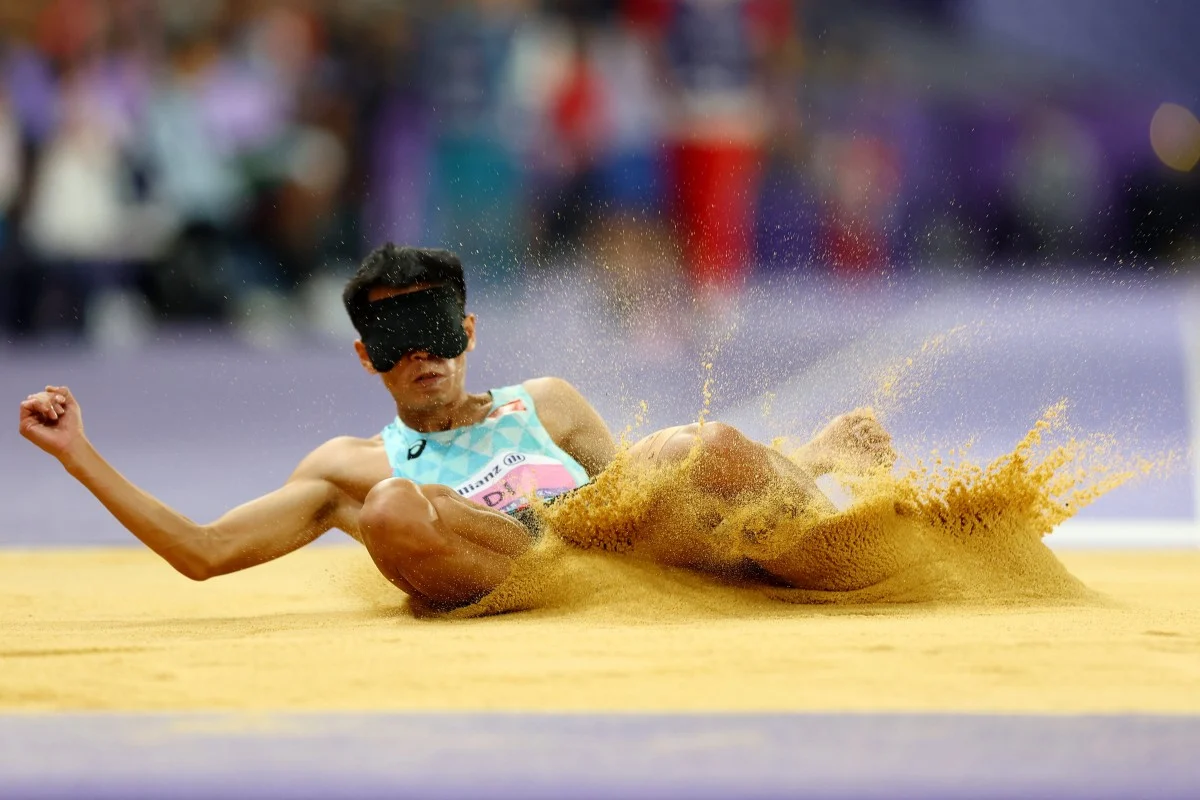
- Venue: Stade de France, Paris
- Dates: 30 August 2024 (final)
- Competitors: 6 from 4 nations
- Winning distance: 6.85 WR

Medalists
1st place, gold medalist(s)		Di Dongdong	China
2nd place, silver medalist(s)		Chen Shichang	China
3rd place, bronze medalist(s)		Joan Munar Martinez	Spain

The T11 category is for athletes with a visual impairment. A T11 athlete may be entirely without sight, or be able to perceive light, but have no ability to see the shape of a hand at any distance. T11 athletes commonly run with guides.

Records

Prior to this competition, the existing world, Paralympic, and area records were as follows:

World Record	Lex Gillette (USA)	6.73	(United States) Mesa	10 May 2014
Paralympic Record	Jose Rodriguez (ESP)	6.67	(United States) Atlanta	18 August 1996

Results

The final in this classification took place on 30 August 2024.

Rank	Athlete	Nation	Attempts						Result	Notes
Rank	Athlete	Nation	1	2	3	4	5	6	Result	Notes
1st place, gold medalist(s)	Di Dongdong	China	6.63	6.51	6.85	x	6.59	-	6.85	WR
2nd place, silver medalist(s)	Chen Shichang	China	6.31	6.29	6.37	6.50	x	6.18	6.50	
3rd place, bronze medalist(s)	Joan Munar Martinez	Spain	5.91	5.75	6.16	6.03	x	6.32	6.32	PB
4	Ye Tao	China	6.11	5.96	5.98	x	6.17	6.29	6.29	
5	Urganchbek Egamnazarov	Uzbekistan	6.08	5.33	x	5.73	6.09	x	6.09	SB
6	Maksim Shavrikov	Neutral Paralympic Athletes	5.14	5.01	5.93	5.79	1.39	5.33	5.93	

=== T12 ===
Men's long jump T12 at the XVII Paralympic Games
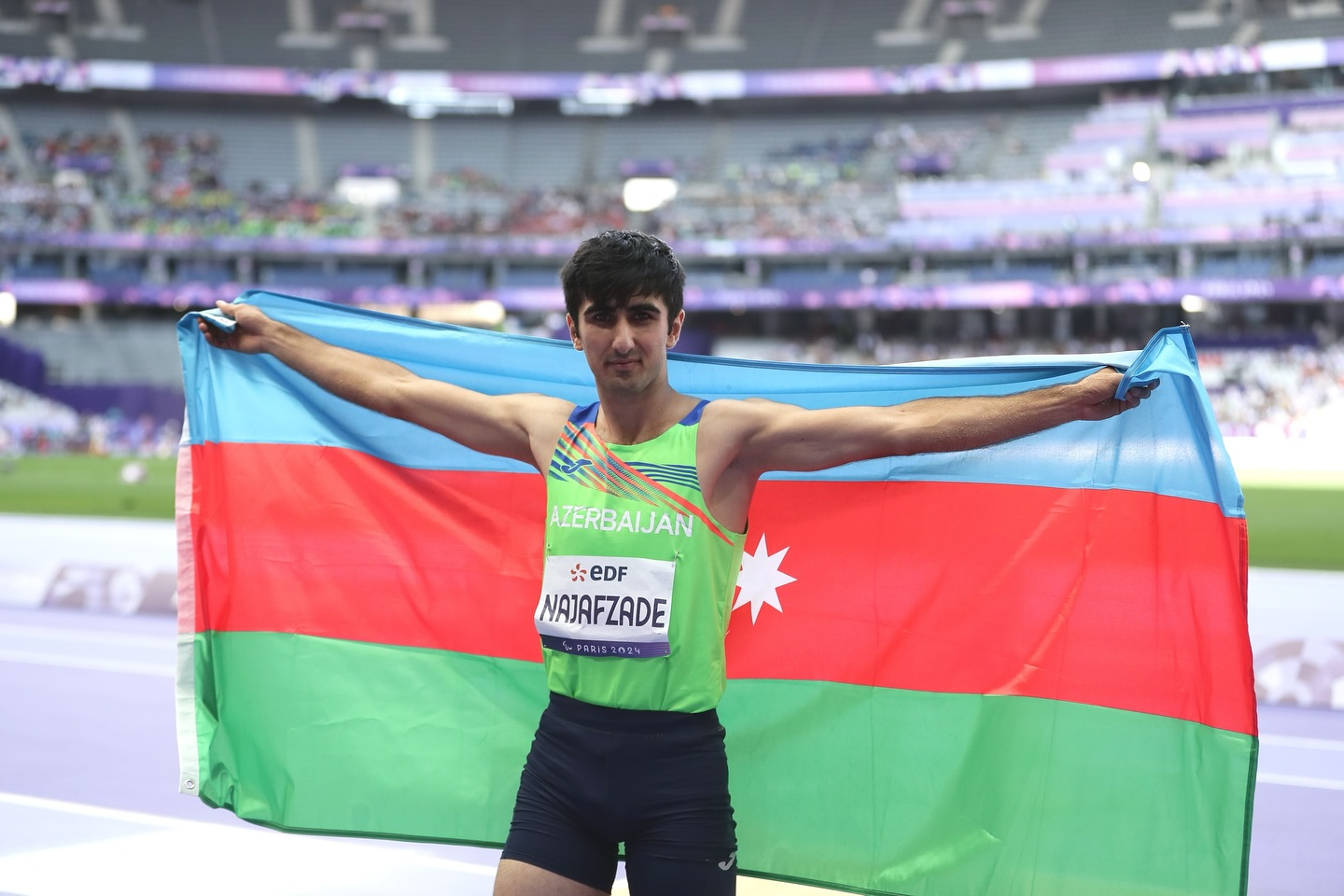
- Venue: Stade de France, Paris
- Dates: 2 September 2024 (final)
- Competitors: 6 from 6 nations
- Winning distance: 7.27

Medalists
1st place, gold medalist(s)		Said Najafzade	Azerbaijan
2nd place, silver medalist(s)		Doniyor Saliev	Uzbekistan
3rd place, bronze medalist(s)		Fernando Vazquez	Argentina

The T12 category is for athletes with visual impairment. Athletes in this category will generally have some residual sight, the ability to recognise the shape of a hand at a distance of 2 metres and the ability to perceive clearly will be no more than 2/60. T12 athletes commonly run with guides.

Records

Prior to this competition, the existing world, Paralympic, and area records were as follows:

World Record	Doniyor Saliev (UZB)	7.47	(France) Paris	12 July 2023
Paralympic Record	Hilton Langenhoven (RSA)	7.31	(China) Beijing	13 September 2008

Results

The final in this classification took place on 2 September 2024.

Rank	Athlete	Nation	Attempts						Result	Notes
Rank	Athlete	Nation	1	2	3	4	5	6	Result	Notes
1st place, gold medalist(s)	Said Najafzade	Azerbaijan	7.08	x	7.19	7.20	7.27	7.09	7.27	
2nd place, silver medalist(s)	Doniyor Saliev	Uzbekistan	7.04	7.05	7.16	7.06	6.96	6.91	7.16	SB
3rd place, bronze medalist(s)	Fernando Vazquez	Argentina	6.61	6.73	6.66	6.53	6.71	6.88	6.88	
4	Kar Gee Wong	Malaysia	6.85	6.61	6.55	x	6.75	6.78	6.85	
5	Daiki Ishiyama	Japan	x	6.53	6.75	6.62	6.60	6.74	6.75	
6	Andreas Walser	Germany	6.43	6.59	6.21	6.73	6.65	6.60	6.73	SB

=== T13 ===
Men's long jump T13 at the XVII Paralympic Games
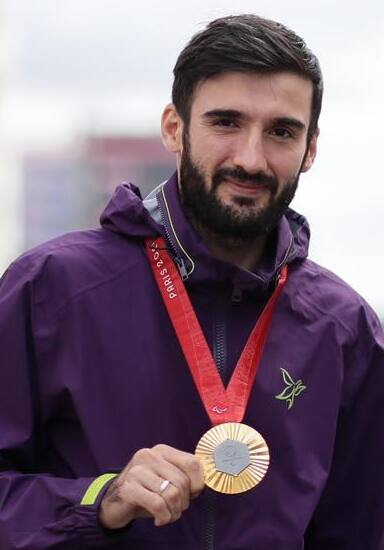
- Venue: Stade de France, Paris
- Dates: 7 September 2024 (final)
- Competitors: 10 from 10 nations
- Winning distance: 7.29

Medalists
1st place, gold medalist(s)		Orkhan Aslanov	Azerbaijan
2nd place, silver medalist(s)		Isaac Jean-Paul	United States
3rd place, bronze medalist(s)		Paulo Henrique Andrade dos Reis	Brazil

The T13 category is for athletes with a moderate visual impairment. Athletes in this category have a variety of visual impairments, but can typically recognize contours from a distance of 2 to 6 metres. Athletes in this category do not typically require a guide.

Records

Prior to this competition, the existing world, Paralympic, and area records were as follows:

World Record	Luis Gutierrez (CUB)	7.66	(Mexico) Guadalajara	18 November 2011
Paralympic Record	Luis Gutierrez (CUB)	7.54	(United Kingdom) London	1 September 2012

Results

The final in this classification took place on 7 September 2024.

Rank	Athlete	Nation	Attempts						Result	Notes
Rank	Athlete	Nation	1	2	3	4	5	6	Result	Notes
1st place, gold medalist(s)	Orkhan Aslanov	Azerbaijan	7.18	7.29	x	7.28	7.11	7.22	7.29	SB
2nd place, silver medalist(s)	Isaac Jean-Paul	United States	7.20	x	x	6.94	6.96	6.87	7.20	SB
3rd place, bronze medalist(s)	Paulo H Andrade	Brazil	6.66	6.95	6.59	7.20	6.92	x	7.20	PB
4	Zak Skinner	Great Britain	6.83	x	6.77	x	6.50	x	6.83	
5	Ivan Jose Cano Blanco	Spain	6.28	6.76	x	6.64	x	6.35	6.76	
6	Doniyorjon Akhmedov	Uzbekistan	6.42	6.45	6.37	6.62	4.96	6.51	6.62	SB
7	Ryota Fukunaga	Japan	x	6.12	6.29	6.35	6.47	6.55	6.55	SB
8	Wisdom Ikhiuwu Smith	Spain	x	5.85	x	5.80	5.61	5.98	5.98	
—	Vegard Sverd	Norway	x	x	x				NM	
—	Ken Thepthida	Laos	x	x	x				NM	

=== T20 ===
Men's long jump T20 at the XVII Paralympic Games
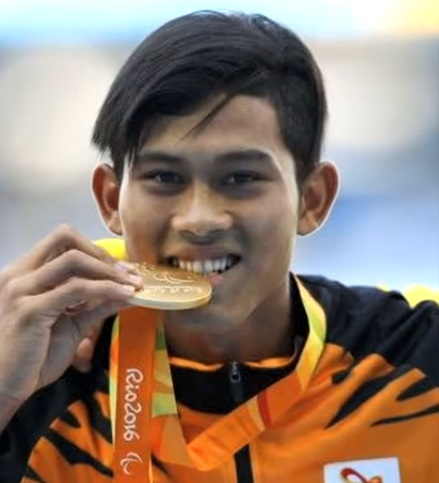
- Venue: Stade de France, Paris
- Dates: 7 September 2024 (final)
- Competitors: 11 from 11 nations
- Winning distance: 7.51

Medalists
1st place, gold medalist(s)		Matvei Iakushev	Neutral Paralympic Athletes
2nd place, silver medalist(s)		Abdul Latif Romly	Malaysia
3rd place, bronze medalist(s)		Jhon Obando	Colombia

The T20 category is for athletes with intellectual impairment. T20 athletes have an IQ score of 75 or less.

Records

Prior to this competition, the existing world, Paralympic, and area records were as follows:

World Record	Abdul Latif Romly (MAS)	7.64	(Indonesia) Jakarta	9 October 2018
Paralympic Record	Abdul Latif Romly (MAS)	7.60	(Brazil) Rio de Janeiro	11 September 2016

Results

The final in this classification took place on 7 September 2024.

Rank	Athlete	Nation	Attempts						Result	Notes
Rank	Athlete	Nation	1	2	3	4	5	6	Result	Notes
1st place, gold medalist(s)	Matvei Iakushev	Neutral Paralympic Athletes	7.10	7.22	7.23	7.28	x	7.51	7.51	AR
2nd place, silver medalist(s)	Abdul Latif Romly	Malaysia	7.22	7.43	7.45	x	x	x	7.45	SB
3rd place, bronze medalist(s)	Jhon Obando	Colombia	6.99	7.38	7.15	7.24	7.26	x	7.38	AR
4	Hassan Dawshi	Saudi Arabia	7.27	6.63	7.31	7.14	7.06	7.13	7.31	PB
5	Noah Vucsics	Canada	6.99	7.15	5.18	6.87	6.92	6.96	7.15	
6	Nicholas Hum	Australia	6.91	6.94	6.97	x	6.87	x	6.97	SB
7	Athanasios Prodromou	Greece	6.68	6.95	x	6.85	6.85	6.85	6.95	
8	Roberto Chalá	Ecuador	6.89	6.85	6.92	x	6.80	x	6.92	
9	Neto Paulo Cezar	Brazil	6.60	6.41	6.13				6.6	
10	Eddy Capdor	Mauritius	6.21	5.76	6.21				6.21	
11	Theodor Rahjane Thomas	Jamaica	x	6.01	x				6.01	PB

=== T36 ===
Men's long jump T36 at the XVII Paralympic Games
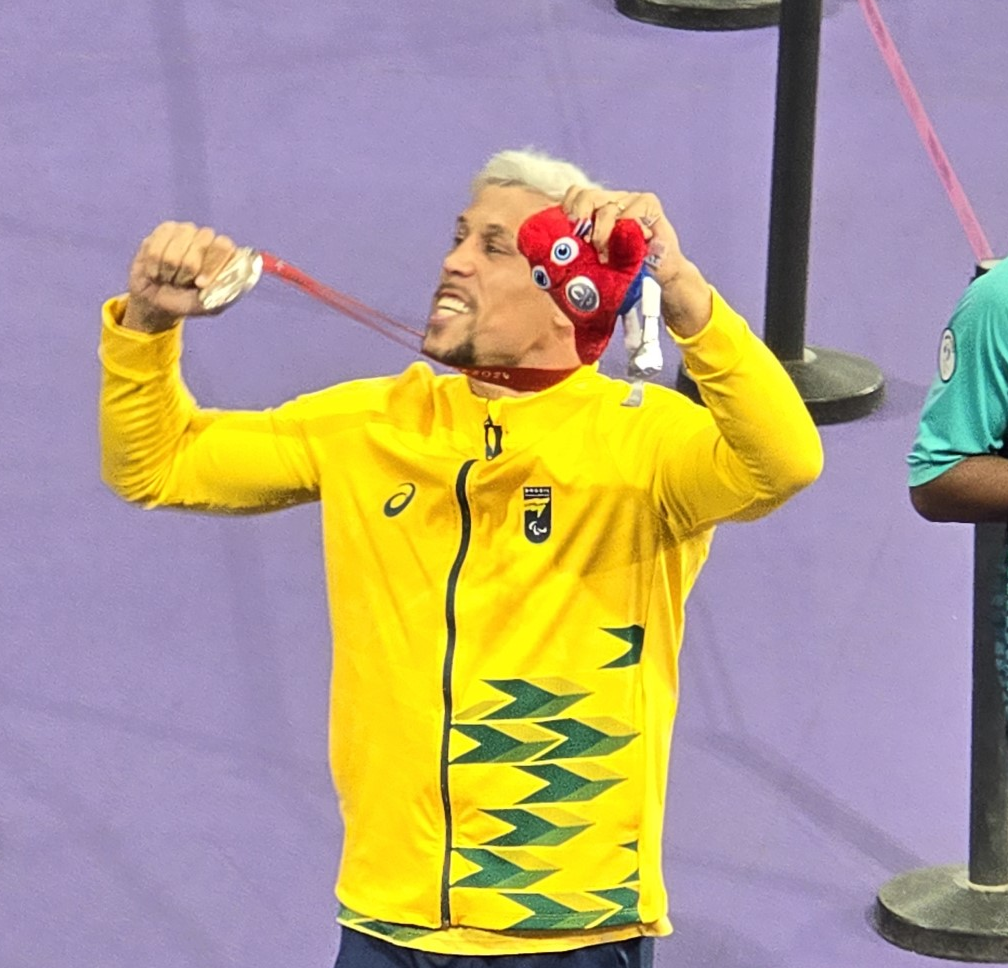
- Venue: Stade de France, Paris
- Dates: 2 September 2024 (final)
- Competitors: 9 from 9 nations
- Winning distance: 5.83 PR

Medalists
1st place, gold medalist(s)		Evgenii Torsunov	Neutral Paralympic Athletes
2nd place, silver medalist(s)		Aser Ramos	Brazil
3rd place, bronze medalist(s)		Oleksandr Lytvynenko	Ukraine

The T36 category is for ambulant athletes with cerebral palsy. These athletes do not have the capacity to remain still and they show involuntary movements with all four limbs affected. They usually walk without assistive devices.

Records

Prior to this competition, the existing world, Paralympic, and area records were as follows:

World Record	Evgenii Torsunov (NPA)	6.05	(Russia) Yekaterinburg	5 June 2024
Paralympic Record	Evgenii Torsunov (RPC)	5.76	(Japan) Tokyo	30 August 2021

Results

The final in this classification took place on 2 September 2024.

Rank	Athlete	Nation	Attempts						Result	Notes
Rank	Athlete	Nation	1	2	3	4	5	6	Result	Notes
1st place, gold medalist(s)	Evgenii Torsunov	Neutral Paralympic Athletes	5.61	5.76	5.48	5.63	5.61	5.83	5.83	PR
2nd place, silver medalist(s)	Aser Ramos	Brazil	5.70	5.76	5.24	x	x	x	5.76	
3rd place, bronze medalist(s)	Oleksandr Lytvynenko	Ukraine	5.76	5.49	5.46	5.56	5.52	5.54	5.76	PB
4	William Stedman	New Zealand	x	5.63	5.74	5.47	5.69	x	5.74	
5	Yang Yifei	China	5.49	5.63	5.05	5.64	5.47	5.56	5.64	SB
6	Rodrigo Parreira da Silva	Brazil	5.37	5.54	5.51	5.60	x	4.36	5.60	
7	Roman Pavlyk	Ukraine	5.45	5.46	5.48	5.26	5.53	5.59	5.59	SB
8	Izzat Turgunov	Uzbekistan	x	5.43	5.55	5.34	5.27	5.58	5.58	SB
9	Segio Markieviche	Argentina	5.08	x	5.11				5.11	

=== T37 ===
Men's long Jump T37 at the XVII Paralympic Games
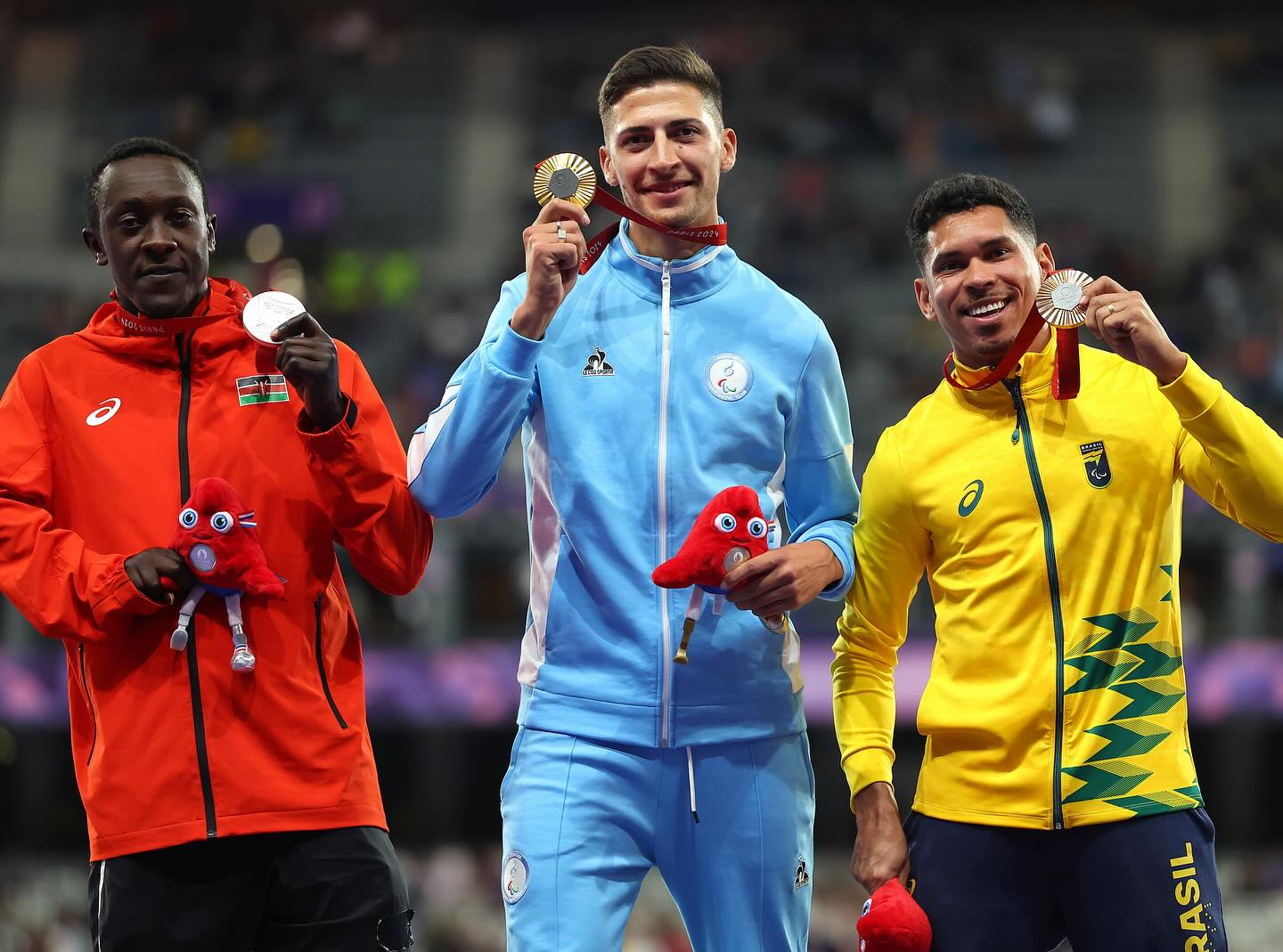
- Venue: Stade de France, Paris
- Dates: 3 September 2024
- Competitors: 9 from 9 nations
- Winning distance: 6.42

Medalists
1st place, gold medalist(s)		Brian Lionel Impellizzeri	Argentina
2nd place, silver medalist(s)		Samson Opiyo	Kenya
3rd place, bronze medalist(s)		Mateus Evangelista	Brazil

The T37 category is for ambulant athletes with cerebral palsy. These athletes have movement and coordination problems on one half of their body. They have good ability in their dominant side of their body (ie hemiplegia).

Records

Prior to this competition, the existing world, Paralympic, and area records were as follows:

World Record	Shang Guangxu (CHN)	6.77	(Brazil) Rio de Janeiro	13 September 2016
Paralympic Record	Shang Guangxu (CHN)	6.77	(Brazil) Rio de Janeiro	13 September 2016

Results

The final in this classification took place on 3 September 2024. The top eight athletes after round three proceeded to the final rounds.

Rank	Athlete	Nation	Attempts						Result	Notes
Rank	Athlete	Nation	1	2	3	4	5	6	Result	Notes
1st place, gold medalist(s)	Brian Lionel Impellizzeri	Argentina	5.93	6.42	6.37	6.40	6.16	x	6.42	
2nd place, silver medalist(s)	Samson Opiyo	Kenya	x	5.83	5.88	6.20	5.67	6.15	6.20	AR
3rd place, bronze medalist(s)	Mateus Evangelista	Brazil	5.77	6.20	6.01	5.90	x	5.86	6.20	SB
4	Ali Olfatnia	Iran	6.04	5.97	5.86	5.73	5.72	x	6.04	
5	Muhammad Nazmi Nasri	Malaysia	5.77	6.00	x	5.79	5.90	5.83	6.00	
6	Vladyslav Zahrebelnyi	Ukraine	5.68	5.96	5.59	5.91	5.80	5.84	5.96	SB
7	Viktoras Pentaras	Cyprus	5.88	5.72	5.46	5.64	5.64	5.72	5.88	
8	Yeferson Suárez	Colombia	5.6	5.71	5.55	5.26	x	5.49	5.71	PB
9	Valentin Bertrand	France	4.39	5.15	5.02				5.15	

=== T38 ===
Men's long jump T38 at the XVII Paralympic Games
- Venue: Stade de France, Paris
- Dates: 4 September 2024
- Competitors: 8 from 5 nations
- Winning distance: 6.52

Medalists
1st place, gold medalist(s)		Khetag Khinchagov	Neutral Paralympic Athletes
2nd place, silver medalist(s)		Zhong Huanghao	China
3rd place, bronze medalist(s)		José Lemos	Colombia

The T38 category is for ambulant athletes with cerebral palsy. T38 athletes have the mildest form of impairment caused by cerebral palsy, often in only one limb, and not affecting the ability to run, walk or jump freely, although impairing performance. T38 athletes may suffer minor co-ordination difficulties.

Records

Prior to this competition, the existing world, Paralympic, and area records were as follows:

World Record	Zhu Dening (CHN)	7.31	(Japan) Tokyo	1 September 2021
Paralympic Record	Zhu Dening (CHN)	7.31	(Japan) Tokyo	1 September 2021

Results

The final in this classification took place on 4 September 2024. Eight athletes participated in the final.

Rank	Athlete	Nation	Attempts						Result	Notes
Rank	Athlete	Nation	1	2	3	4	5	6	Result	Notes
1st place, gold medalist(s)	Khetag Khinchagov	Neutral Paralympic Athletes	6.31	5.99	6.13	6.52	6.32	6.09	6.52	=SB
2nd place, silver medalist(s)	Zhong Huanghao	China	x	6.50	6.00	6.14	x	6.36	6.50	
3rd place, bronze medalist(s)	José Lemos	Colombia	5.94	6.28	6.20	6.24	5.92	6.40	6.40	SB
4	Karim Chan	Great Britain	x	6.32	x	6.16	6.19	6.39	6.39	
5	Nick Mayhugh	United States	5.75	5.86	5.87	5.94	6.12	6.32	6.32	PB
6	Ryan Medrano	United States	5.82	x	6.23	5.82	6.21	5.76	6.23	PB
7	Mohamed Farhat Chida	Tunisia	6.00	5.87	5.83	5.58	5.67	5.69	6.00	
8	Zhou Peng	China	5.64	5.43	5.77	x	5.51	5.46	5.77	

=== T47 ===
Men's long Jump T47 at the XVII Paralympic Games
- Venue: Stade de France, Paris
- Dates: 3 September 2024
- Competitors: 8 from 8 nations
- Winning distance: 7.41

Medalists
1st place, gold medalist(s)		Robiel Sol	Cuba
2nd place, silver medalist(s)		Wang Hao	China
3rd place, bronze medalist(s)		Nikita Kotukov	Neutral Paralympic Athletes

The T47 category is for athletes who have a single below elbow or wrist amputation or similar disability, with normal function in both legs.

This event included T46 athletes.

The T46 category is for athletes who have a single above or below elbow amputation or similar disability, with normal function in both legs.

Records

Prior to this competition, the existing world, Paralympic, and area records were as follows:

World Record	Robiel Sol (CUB)	7.84	(Mexico) Xalapa	7 April 2024
Paralympic Record	Robiel Sol (CUB)	7.46	(Japan) Tokyo	31 August 2021

Results

The final in this classification took place on 3 September 2024.

Rank	Athlete	Nation	Attempts						Result	Notes
Rank	Athlete	Nation	1	2	3	4	5	6	Result	Notes
1st place, gold medalist(s)	Robiel Sol	Cuba	7.25	x	6.44	7.41	x	7.22	7.41	
2nd place, silver medalist(s)	Wang Hao	China	7.10	7.19	7.32	7.23	7.24	7.08	7.32	SB
3rd place, bronze medalist(s)	Nikita Kotukov	Neutral Paralympic Athletes	6.69	6.78	7.05	6.98	6.74	x	7.05	
4	Roderick Townsend	United States	6.89	6.50	6.61	x	6.24	6.46	6.89	
5	Arnaud Assoumani	France	6.71	x	6.63	6.66	x	6.77	6.77	
6	Mahmoud Ay-Saabib	Egypt	6.13	6.11	6.08	5.92	6.04	6.25	6.25	
7	Yamoussa Sylla	Guinea	5.70	5.61	5.16	5.14	r		5.70	
—	Jutomu Kollie	Liberia							DNS	

=== T63 ===
Men's long Jump T63 at the XVII Paralympic Games
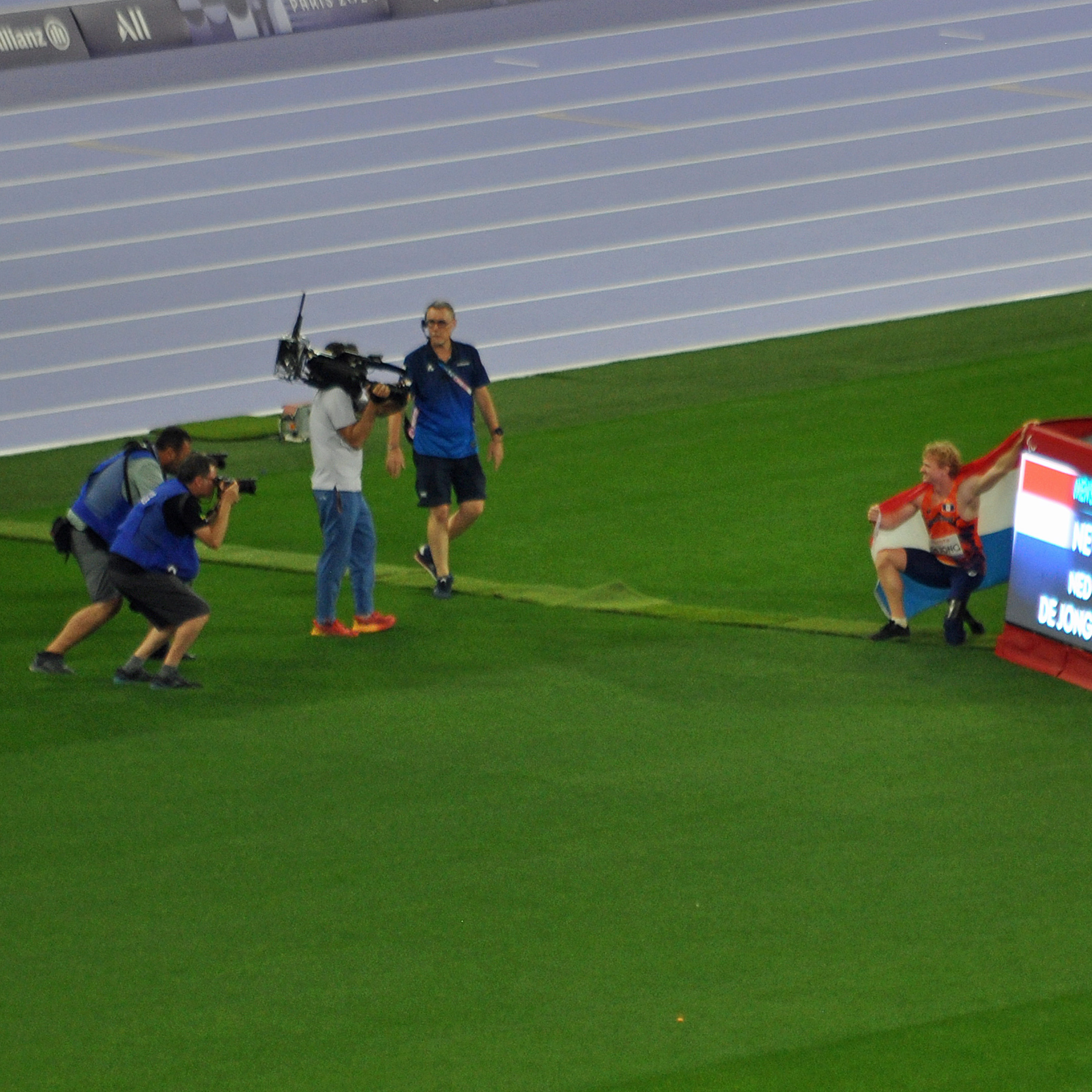
- Venue: Stade de France, Paris
- Dates: 31 August 2024
- Competitors: 7 from 6 nations
- Winning distance: 7.68

Medalists
1st place, gold medalist(s)		Joel de Jong	Netherlands
2nd place, silver medalist(s)		Daniel Wagner	Denmark
3rd place, bronze medalist(s)		Noah Mbuyamba	Netherlands

Results

The final in this classification took place on 31 August 2024.

Rank	Athlete	Nation	Attempts						Result	Notes
Rank	Athlete	Nation	1	2	3	4	5	6	Result	Notes
1st place, gold medalist(s)	Joel de Jong	Netherlands	x	7.42	x	x	7.49	7.68	7.68	WR
2nd place, silver medalist(s)	Daniel Wagner	Denmark	7.39	7.33	x	x	7.23	x	7.39	PB
3rd place, bronze medalist(s)	Noah Mbuyamba	Netherlands	x	7.01	x	x	6.53	6.65	7.01	PB
4	Leon Schaefer	Germany	6.43	5.86	6.93	6.75	5.42	6.91	6.93	
5	Ezra Frech	United States	6.52	6.58	x	x	x	x	6.58	
6	Puseletso Michael Mabote	South Africa	x	x	6.44	x	x	x	6.44	AR
7	Wagner Astacio	Dominican Republic	3.9	x	r				3.90	PR^{T42}

=== T64 ===
Men's long Jump T64 at the XVII Paralympic Games
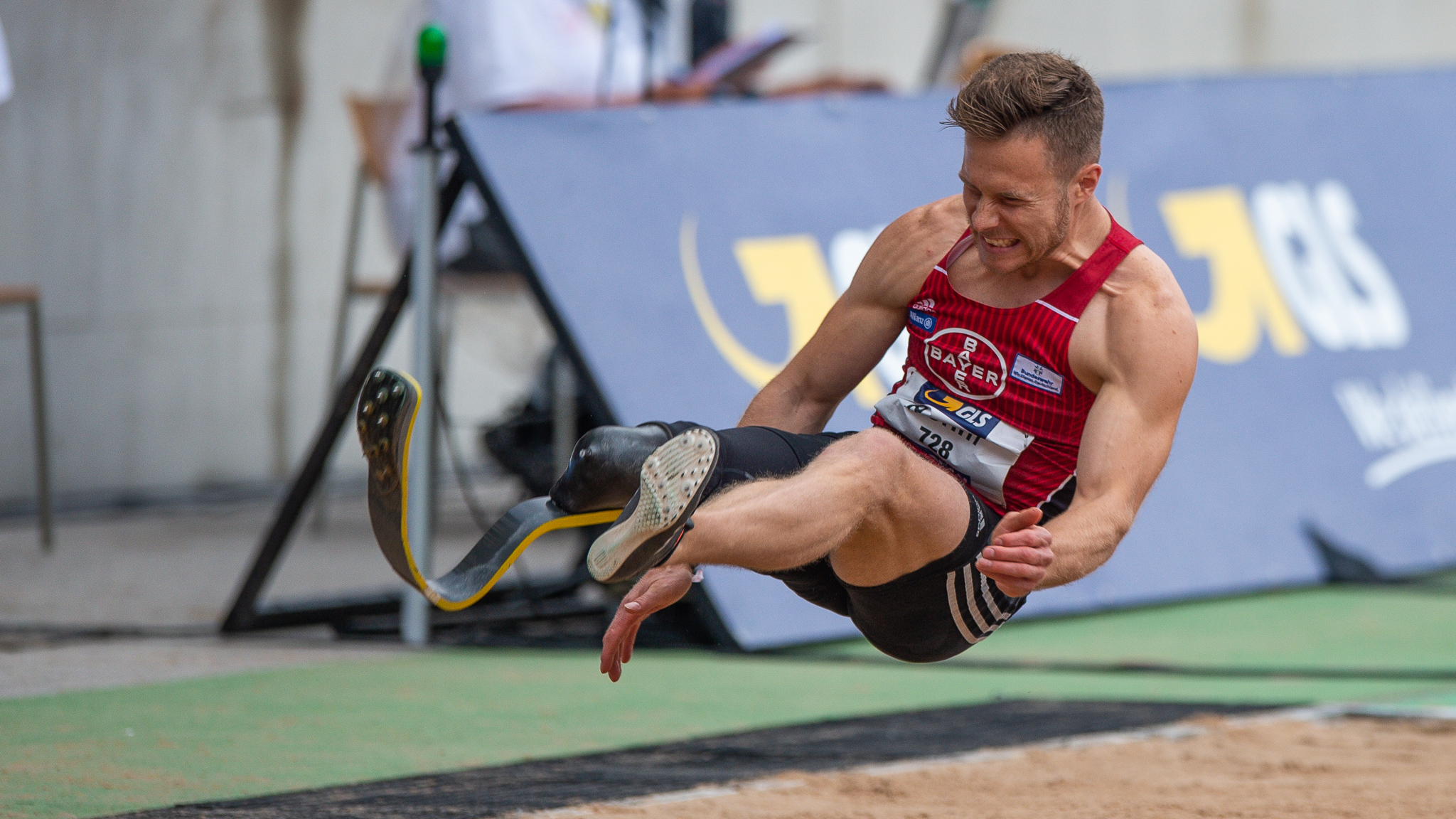
- Markus Rehm
- Venue: Stade de France, Paris
- Dates: 4 September 2024
- Competitors: 9 from 6 nations
- Winning distance: 8.13

Medalists
1st place, gold medalist(s)		Markus Rehm	Germany
2nd place, silver medalist(s)		Derek Loccident	United States
3rd place, bronze medalist(s)		Jarryd Wallace	United States

The event features both T64, T62 and T44 classified athletes.

T64 athletes have an absence of one leg below the knee and use a prosthetic running leg. T44 athletes have mild limb loss, muscle weakness or restrictions in the legs who don't use any prosthetics.

Records

Prior to this competition, the existing world, Paralympic, and area records were as follows:

T44

World Record	Mpumelelo Mhlongo (RSA)	7.07	(United Arab Emirates) Dubai	7 April 2024
Paralympic Record	Mpumelelo Mhlongo (RSA)	6.80	(Japan) Tokyo	31 August 2021

T62

World Record	Stylianos Malakopoulos (GRE)	7.23	(Germany) Bremen	18 May 2023
Paralympic Record	Stylianos Malakopoulos (GRE)	7.04	(Japan) Tokyo	1 September 2021

T64

World Record	Markus Rehm (GER)	8.72	(Germany) Rhede	25 June 2023
Paralympic Record	Markus Rehm (GER)	8.21	(Brazil) Rio de Janeiro	17 September 2016

Results

The final in this classification took place on 4 September 2024. After three jumps, the top eight athletes progressed to the final series of jumps.

Rank	Athlete	Nation	Attempts						Result	Notes
Rank	Athlete	Nation	1	2	3	4	5	6	Result	Notes
1st place, gold medalist(s)	Markus Rehm	Germany	7.83	8.04	7.78	8.04	8.13	7.59	8.13	
2nd place, silver medalist(s)	Derek Loccident	United States	7.57	7.79	7.41	7.37	7.76	x	7.79	
3rd place, bronze medalist(s)	Jarryd Wallace	United States	7.17	x	7.21	x	7.49	7.27	7.49	
4	Dimitri Pavade	France	7.43	6.74	7.04	x	x	x	7.43	
5	Mpumelelo Mhlongo	South Africa	6.89	7.04	6.86	6.92	7.12	6.85	7.12	WR^{T44}
6	Noah Bodelier	Germany	4.56	6.75	6.47	6.95	6.68	6.98	6.98	
7	Stylianos Malakopoulos	Greece	6.62	6.14	6.67	6.64	6.49	6.81	6.81	
8	Marco Cicchetti	Italy	6.55	6.29	6.62	6.56	x	6.63	6.63	
9	Trenten Merrill	United States	x	6.26	6.41				6.41	
