= 2023 World Para Athletics Championships – Men's long jump =

The men's long jump events at the 2023 World Para Athletics Championships were held at Charlety Stadium, Paris, France, from 9 to 17 July.

== Medalists ==
Event	Gold	Silver	Bronze
T11	Di Dongdong; China	Ye Tao; China	Joan Munar Martinez; Spain
T12	Doniyor Saliev; Uzbekistan	Amir Khosravani; Iran	Said Najafzade; Azerbaijan
T13	Isaac Jean-Paul; United States	Ryota Fukunaga; Japan	Zak Skinner; Great Britain
T20	Abdul Latif Romly; Malaysia	Noah Vucsics; Canada	Athanasios Prodromou; Greece
T36	Izzat Turgunov; Uzbekistan	William Stedman; New Zealand	Oleksandr Lytvynenko; Ukraine
T37	Brian Lionel Impellizzeri; Argentina	Vladyslav Zahrebelnyi; Ukraine	Valentin Bertrand; France
T38	Zhu Dening; China	Zhong Huanghao; China	José Lemos; Colombia
T47	Robiel Yankiel Sol Cervantes; Cuba	Roderick Townsend; United States	Nemanja Matijašević; Serbia
T63	Leon Schaefer; Germany	Daniel Wagner; Denmark	Joel de Jong; Netherlands
T64	Markus Rehm; Germany	Derek Loccident; United States	Jarryd Wallace; United States

== Results ==
=== T11 ===
The event took place on 9 July.

Rank	Athlete	Result	Notes
1st place, gold medalist(s)	Di Dongdong (CHN)	6.38	SB
2nd place, silver medalist(s)	Ye Tao (CHN)	6.25	
3rd place, bronze medalist(s)	Joan Munar Martinez (ESP)	6.15	SB
4	Urganchbek Egamnazarov (UZB)	6.06	PB
5	Ronan Pallier (FRA)	6.01	SB
6	Edurado Uceda Novas (ESP)	5.91	PB
7	Lex Gillette (USA)	5.81	
8	Ruslan Katyshev (UKR)	5.78	
9	Toghrul Humbatov (AZE)	5.41	SB
10	Seif Eddine Hekas (ALG)	5.34	
11	Elchin Muradov (AZE)	5.32	SB
12	Martin Parejo Maza (ESP)	5.19	
13	Chen Xingyu (CHN)	4.90	

=== T12 ===
The event took place on 12 July.

Rank	Athlete	Result	Notes
1st place, gold medalist(s)	Doniyor Saliev (UZB)	7.47	=WR
2nd place, silver medalist(s)	Amir Khosravani (IRN)	7.26	PB
3rd place, bronze medalist(s)	Said Najafzade (AZE)	7.11	SB
4	Daiki Ishiyama (JPN)	6.83	
5	Andreas Walser (GER)	6.82	SB
6	Kamil Aliyev (AZE)	6.67	SB
7	Wong Kar Gee (MAS)	6.65	SB
8	Fernando Vázquez (ARG)	6.58	
9	Tobias Jonsson (SWE)	6.38	SB
10	Olof Ryberg (SWE)	6.17	SB
11	Brian Esogon (KEN)	5.96	SB
—	Alex Njeru (KEN)		DNS

=== T13 ===
The event took place on 17 July.

Rank	Athlete	Result	Notes
1st place, gold medalist(s)	Isaac Jean-Paul (USA)	7.06	
2nd place, silver medalist(s)	Ryota Fukunaga (JPN)	7.03	AR
3rd place, bronze medalist(s)	Zak Skinner (GBR)	6.97	PB
4	Orkhan Aslanov (AZE)	6.83	SB
5	Doniyorjon Akhmedov (UZB)	6.82	PB
6	Paulo Henrique Andrade (BRA)	6.67	
7	Tyson Gunter (USA)	6.72	
8	Franco Pinetti (ARG)	6.43	PB
9	Vegard Dragsund Sverd (NOR)	6.34	
10	Iván José Cano Blanco (ESP)	5.99	
11	Windsom Ikhiuwu Smith (ESP)	5.88	
12	Islam Salimov (KAZ)	5.69	SB
13	Wu Nung-pin (TPE)	5.69	
14	Huang Chia-huang (TPE)	5.57	
15	Joan Sirera Molina (ESP)	5.34	

=== T20 ===
The event took place on 17 July.

Rank	Athlete	Result	Notes
1st place, gold medalist(s)	Abdul Latif Romly (MAS)	7.40	CR
2nd place, silver medalist(s)	Noah Vucsics (CAN)	7.35	AR
3rd place, bronze medalist(s)	Athanasios Prodromou (GRE)	7.12	SB
4	Hassan Dawshi (KSA)	7.03	PB
5	Ranki Oberoi (NED)	6.83	SB
6	Alex Stevan Chala (ECU)	6.73	PB
7	Roberto Chala (ECU)	6.64	SB
8	Suhairi Suhani (SGP)	6.49	SB
9	Eddy Capdor (MRI)	6.40	
10	Paulo Cezar Neto (BRA)	6.18	SB
11	Louis Denovan Jason Rabaye (MRI)	5.98	
12	Chow Chi Wai (HKG)	5.98	
13	Chong Kung Yuen (HKG)	5.71	
14	Julien Ovide (MRI)	5.41	

=== T36 ===
The event took place on 12 July.

Rank	Athlete	Result	Notes
1st place, gold medalist(s)	Izzat Turgunov (UZB)	5.75	=CR
2nd place, silver medalist(s)	William Stedman (NZL)	5.71	AR
3rd place, bronze medalist(s)	Oleksandr Lytvynenko (UKR)	5.68	PB
4	Roman Pavlyk (UKR)	5.62	SB
5	Rodrigo Parreira da Silva (BRA)	5.57	
6	Mokhtar Didane (ALG)	5.56	
7	Aser Almeida (BRA)	5.54	
8	Omar Acosta (COL)	5.51	
9	Anastasios Petropoulos (GRE)	4.67	
10	Marian Petria (ROU)	3.74	SB
—	Taha Al Harrasi (OMA)		DNS

=== T37 ===
The event took place on 15 July.

Rank	Athlete	Result	Notes
1st place, gold medalist(s)	Brian Lionel Impellizzeri (ARG)	6.67	CR
2nd place, silver medalist(s)	Vladyslav Zahrebelnyi (UKR)	6.10	SB
3rd place, bronze medalist(s)	Valentin Bertrand (FRA)	5.92	
4	Mateus Evangelista (BRA)	5.89	
5	Viktoras Pentaras (CYP)	5.76	SB
6	Barney Corrall (GBR)	5.66	
7	Samson Opiyo (KEN)	5.58	PB
8	Mateusz Owczarek (POL)	5.57	
9	Konstantinos Kamaras (GRE)	5.54	
10	Jesse Zesseu (CAN)	5.38	
11	Nikkolaj Gulbrandsen (NOR)	4.77	SB

=== T38 ===
The event took place on 14 July.

Rank	Athlete	Result	Notes
1st place, gold medalist(s)	Zhu Dening (CHN)	6.78	SB
2nd place, silver medalist(s)	Zhong Huanghao (CHN)	6.70	SB
3rd place, bronze medalist(s)	José Lemos (COL)	6.51	
4	Karim Chan (GBR)	6.39	
5	Mohamed Farhat Chida (MAR)	6.01	SB
6	Mykyta Senyk (UKR)	5.80	SB
7	Ryan Medrano (USA)	5.70	
8	Davit Kavtaradze (GEO)	5.63	SB
9	Cameron Crombie (AUS)	5.28	
10	Jose Rafael Ramos (PUR)	4.53	

=== T47 ===
The final of this event was held at 9:04 on 13 Jul 2023.

Rank	Name	Nationality	Mark	Notes
1st place, gold medalist(s)	Robiel Yankiel Sol Cervantes	Cuba	7.63	CR
2nd place, silver medalist(s)	Roderick Townsend	United States	7.31	SB
3rd place, bronze medalist(s)	Nemanja Matijasevic	Serbia	7.05	SB
4	Arnaud Assoumani	France	6.97	SB
5	Hao Wang	China	6.96	
6	Alberto Nicolas Piriz	Argentina	6.85	PB
7	Omadbek Khasanov	Uzbekistan	6.78	PB
8	Bruno dos Santos	Brazil	6.65	
9	Vincent Kiprono Mutai	Kenya	6.58	
10	Yusuf Shabib Abdulrhman	Egypt	6.49	PB
11	Yalong Zhao	China	6.45	SB
12	Georgios Kostakis	Greece	6.2	
13	Bouba Ibrahim	Cameroon	6.13	SB
14	Abdullah Ilgaz	Turkey	5.7	SB
15	Bradley Murere	Namibia	5.62	SB
—	Dallas Wise	United States		DNS

=== T63 ===
The event took place on 10 July.

Rank	Athlete	Sport Class	Result	Notes
1st place, gold medalist(s)	Leon Schaefer (GER)	T63	7.25	WR
2nd place, silver medalist(s)	Daniel Wagner (DEN)	T63	7.03	SB
3rd place, bronze medalist(s)	Joel de Jong (NED)	T63	6.92	
4	Ezra Frech (USA)	T63	6.64	AR
5	Ali Lacin (GER)	T61	6.29	CR
6	Noah Mbuyamba (NED)	T63	6.24	
7	Hajime Kondo (JPN)	T63	6.00	PB
8	Atsushi Yamamoto (JPN)	T63	5.87	
9	Kantinan Khumphong (THA)	T63	5.63	SB
10	Georgios Anyfantis (GRE)	T63	5.62	
11	Puseletso Michael Mabote (RSA)	T63	5.57	AR
—	Luke Sinnott (GBR)	T61		NM

=== T64 ===
The event was held on 14 Jul 2023.

Rank	Name	Nationality	Mark	Notes
1st place, gold medalist(s)	Markus Rehm	Germany	8.49	CR
2nd place, silver medalist(s)	Derek Loccident	United States	7.39	
3rd place, bronze medalist(s)	Jarryd Wallace	United States	7.34	
4	Trenten Merrill	United States	7.33	
5	Stylianos Malakopoulos	Greece	6.89	CR
6	Marco Cicchetti	Italy	6.64	
7	Mpumelelo Mhlongo	South Africa	6.62	SB
8	Noah Bodelier	Germany	6.48	
9	Konstantinos Veltsis	Greece	6.25	
10	Yamani Nasri	Morocco	6.25	
11	Ngono Loic Wandji	Cameroon	5.38	SB
