= 2019 World Para Athletics Championships – Men's long jump =

The men's long jump at the 2019 World Para Athletics Championships was held at the Dubai Club for People with Determination in Dubai from 7–15 November.

== Medalists ==
Event	Gold		Silver		Bronze	
T11	Lex Gillette; United States	6.45 CR	Xingyu Chen; China	6.43	di Dongdong; China	6.33
T12	Doniyor Saliev; Uzbekistan	7.44 CR	Wong Kar Gee; Malaysia	7.06 SB	Kamil Aliyev; Azerbaijan	7.00 SB
T13	Bekjon Chevarov; Uzbekistan	7.23 AR	Isaac Jean-Paul; United States	7.18 PB	Iván José Cano Blanco; Spain	7.04 PB
T20	Ranki Oberoi; Netherlands	7.39	Abdul Latif Romly; Malaysia	7.24	Roberto Carlos Chala Espinoza; Ecuador	6.88
T36	Evgenii Torsunov; Russia	5.73	Rodrigo Parreira da Silva; Brazil	5.58 SB	Oleksandr Lytvynenko; Ukraine	5.55 PB
T37	Peng Zhou; China	6.23	Mateus Evangelista Cardoso; Brazil	6.10	Vladyslav Zahrebelnyi; Ukraine	6.07 PB
T38	Zhu Dening; China	6.61	Khetag Khinchagov; Russia	6.42 AR	Mykyta Senyk; Ukraine	6.38
T47	Wang Hao; China	7.29	Roderick Townsend-Roberts; United States	7.27 SB	Tobi Fawehinmi; United States	7.17
T63	Leon Schaefer; Germany	6.90 CR	Daniel Wagner; Denmark	6.84 PB	Atsushi Yamamoto; Japan	6.40
T64	Markus Rehm; Germany	8.17	Dimitri Pavadé; France	7.25 PB	Mpumelelo Mhlongo; South Africa	7.07 WR
WR world record | AR area record | CR championship record | GR games record | NR national record | OR Olympic record | PB personal best | SB season best | WL world leading (in a given season)

Events listed in pink were contested but no medals were awarded.

== Detailed results ==
=== T11 ===
The event was held on 10 November.

Rank	Athlete	1	2	3	4	5	6	Best	Notes
1st place, gold medalist(s)	Lex Gillette (USA)	4.55	5.68	5.99	6.45	5.65	6.05	6.45	CR
2nd place, silver medalist(s)	Xingyu Chen (CHN)	6.17	5.95	5.87	6.43	6.14	5.94	6.43	
3rd place, bronze medalist(s)	di Dongdong (CHN)	6.18	5.57	5.47	6.33	x	5.54	6.33	
4	Ronan Pallier (FRA)	5.90	x	x	6.09	6.16	6.20	6.20	
5	Ruslan Katyshev (UKR)	5.99	x	x	5.84	x	x	5.99	SB
6	Chuan-Hul Yang (TPE)	4.72	5.87	5.84	5.51	5.63	5.53	5.87	
7	Xavier Porras (ESP)	5.86	5.77	5.67	5.69	x	x	5.86	
8	Elchin Muradov (AZE)	5.24	x	5.66	3.14	x	-	5.66	
9	Martin Pareo Maza (ESP)	5.50	5.43	5.45				5.50	
10	Miran Sahatov (UZB)	5.19	5.43	5.47				5.47	
	Maksim Shavrikov (RUS)	x	x	x				NM	

=== T12 ===
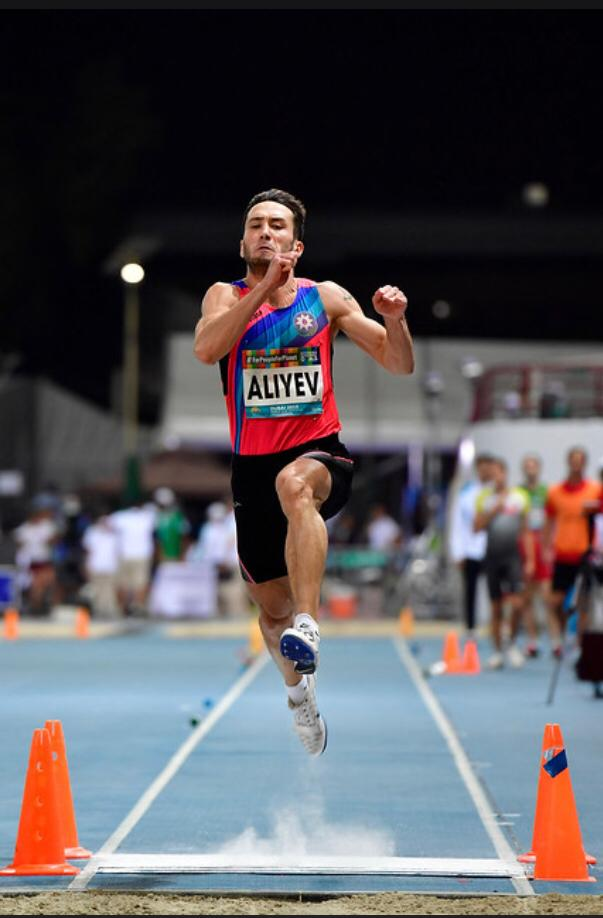
Kamil Aliyev from Azerbaijan competing in T12 long jump

The event was held on 7 November.

Rank	Athlete	1	2	3	4	5	6	Best	Notes
1st place, gold medalist(s)	Doniyor Saliev (UZB)	7.44	7.30	7.39	7.14	7.03	7.22	7.44	CR
2nd place, silver medalist(s)	Wong Kar Gee (MAS)	6.83	6.95	6.90	6.80	7.06	6.93	7.06	PB
3rd place, bronze medalist(s)	Kamil Aliyev (AZE)	6.85	x	6.88	6.85	7.00	6.91	7.00	PB
4	Siarhei Burdukou (BLR)	6.62	6.83	6.70	6.73	6.78	6.68	6.83	
5	Tobias Jonsson (SWE)	6.73	6.77	6.61	6.72	6.71	6.49	6.68	SB
6	Hilton Langenhoven (RSA)	x	6.76	6.72	x	6.67	x	6.76	
7	Nabil Rahhali Omari (MAR)	6.48	6.52	6.34	6.65	r		6.08	PB
8	Marcel Boetgger (GER)	5.46	6.09	4.45	6.40	6.39	6.12	6.40	PB

=== T13 ===
The event was held on 12 November.

Rank	Athlete	1	2	3	4	5	6	Best	Notes
1st place, gold medalist(s)	Bekjon Chevarov (UZB)	6.40	x	6.89	6.95	7.23	6.78	7.23	AR
2nd place, silver medalist(s)	Isaac Jean-Paul (USA)	x	6.93	6.82	6.80	7.18	x	7.18	PB
3rd place, bronze medalist(s)	Iván José Cano Blanco (ESP)	6.74	6.58	6.76	6.97	7.04	6.81	7.04	PB
4	Per Jonsson (SWE)	6.75	6.34	6.52	6.69	6.88	x	6.88	SB
5	Zak Skinner (GBR)	x	5.93	6.52	6.47	6.86	6.54	6.86	
6	Islam Salimov (KAZ)	6.03	6.25	6.42	6.66	6.44	6.31	6.66	SB
7	Radoslav Zlatonov (BUL)	6.38	6.01	6.21	6.44	6.31	6.08	6.44	
8	Markeith Price (USA)	6.21	6.41	6.24	6.23	6.19	6.22	6.41	
9	Gonzalex S.JB (MEX)	x	x	6.36				6.36	
10	David Gerber (FRA)	5.91	6.17	5.69				6.17	
11	Andrel Josan (GRE)	5.99	x	x				5.99	
12	Chia-Huang Huang (TPE)	5.93	5.61	5.58				5.93	PB
13	Olof Ryberg (SWE)	5.60	5.85	5.62				5.85	

=== T20 ===
Rank	Athlete	1	2	3	4	5	6	Best	Notes
1st place, gold medalist(s)									
2nd place, silver medalist(s)									
3rd place, bronze medalist(s)									
4									
5									

=== T36 ===
Rank	Athlete	1	2	3	4	5	6	Best	Notes
1st place, gold medalist(s)									
2nd place, silver medalist(s)									
3rd place, bronze medalist(s)									
4									
5									
6									
7									
8									

=== T37 ===
Rank	Athlete	1	2	3	4	5	6	Best	Notes
1st place, gold medalist(s)	Peng Zhou (CHN)	6.18	5.88	x	6.16	6.23	x	6.23	PB
2nd place, silver medalist(s)	Mateus Evangelista Cardoso (BRA)	5.78	5.98	5.92	5.93	6.10	5.99	6.10	
3rd place, bronze medalist(s)	Vladyslaw Zahrebelnyi (UKR)	5.94	6.00	6.03	5.80	6.07	5.91	6.07	
4	Chermen Kobesov (RUS)	5.83	5.76	5.65	5.62	5.64	5.65	5.83	
5	Valentin Bertrand (FRA)	x	5.38	5.52	5.59	5.37	5.79	5.79	
6	Moussa Tambadou (FRA)	3.70	5.66	5.76	5.76	x	5.74	5.76	SB
7	Victoras Pentaras (CYP)	5.70	x	5.36	5.44	5.58	5.36	5.70	PB
8	Haider Ali (PAK)	5.40	5.43	-	-	-		5.43	
9	Mateusz Owczarek (POL)	5.12	x	4.46				5.12	
10	Ruber Persoons (BEL)	4.62	4.78	4.99				4.99	SB

=== T38 ===
Rank	Athlete	1	2	3	4	5	6	Best	Notes
1st place, gold medalist(s)									
2nd place, silver medalist(s)									
3rd place, bronze medalist(s)									
4									
5									
6									
7									
8									

=== T47 ===
Rank	Athlete	1	2	3	4	5	6	Best	Notes
1st place, gold medalist(s)	Wang Hao (CHN)	x	6.89	7.09	6.99	7.09	7.29	7.29	
2nd place, silver medalist(s)	Roderick Townsend-Roberts (USA)	7.93	6.97	x	7.00	7.27	7.07	7.27	SB
3rd place, bronze medalist(s)	Tobi Fawehinmi (USA)	6.88	x	7.17	7.13	6.80	x	7.17	
4	Nikita Kotukov (RUS)	6.61	6.69	6.91	7.12	x	6.97	7.12	PB
5	Nemanja Matijasevic (SRB)	6.85	6.70	x	x	6.88	6.78	6.88	PB
6	Hajimu Ashida (JPN)	6.57	x	6.63	x	6.58	6.85	6.85	
7	Yudai Suzuki (JPN)	x	6.37	6.67	6.44	x	6.55	6.67	PB
8	Vincent Kiprono Mutai (KEN)	6.33	6.13	6.65	6.31	6.11	6.18	6.65	
9	Arnaud Assoumani (FRA)	-	6.38	6.61				6.61	SB
10	Tanner Wright (USA)	6.54	x	6.59				6.59	SB
11	Setiyo Budihartanto (INA)	x	x	6.36				6.36	
12	Perez Hernandex CJ (ESP)	x	x	6.27				6.27	
13	Daniel Perez Martinez (ESP)	6.03	6.16	6.21				6.21	PB
14	Chaiwat Sirimongkol (THA)	x	x	6.09				6.09	
15	Bouba Ibrahim Bouba (CMR)	x	6.06	6.01				6.06	
16	Antoan Bozhilov (BUL)	6.02	6.05	x				6.05	
17	Giorgi Nikoladze (GEO)	5.26	5.64	5.73				5.73	
18	Kerim Elyaz (TUR)	5.61'	5.54	5.56				6.65	

=== T63 ===
Rank	Athlete	1	2	3	4	5	6	Best	Notes
1st place, gold medalist(s)	Leon Schaefer (GER)	6.90	6.85	x	6.76	6.87	6.89	6.90	CR
2nd place, silver medalist(s)	Daniel Wagner (DEN)	x	6.76	6.78	6.56	6.84	x	6.84	PB
3rd place, bronze medalist(s)	Atsushi Yamamoto (JPN)	6.39	6.40	6.01	6.10	x	5.53	6.40	
4	Ntando Mahlangu (RSA)	5.57	5.49	4.22	5.32	5.82	x	5.82	
5	Luke Sinnott (GBR)	5.57	x	x	x	5.05	x	5.57	
6	Marco Pentagoni (ITA)	5.33	5.53	x	5.49	5.46	x	5.53	
7	Desmond Jackson (USA)	5.51	5.03	5.30	5.22	5.30	5.27	5.51	AR
8	Ezra Frech (USA)	5.45	5.16	x	5.06	5.24	5.05	5.45	
9	Ali Lacin (GER)	x	x	5.26				5.26	
10	Mulyono (INA)	4.48	4.59	4.58				4.59	
11	Kantinan Khumphong (THA)	4.47	x	4.22				4.47	
	Buddika Idrapala (SRI)	x	x	x				NM	

=== T64 ===
Rank	Athlete	1	2	3	4	5	6	Best	Notes
1st place, gold medalist(s)									
2nd place, silver medalist(s)									
3rd place, bronze medalist(s)									
4									
5									
6									
7									
8									

== See also ==
- List of IPC world records in athletics
