= 2024 World Para Athletics Championships – Men's long jump =

The men's long jump events at the 2024 World Para Athletics Championships were held in Kobe.

== Medalists ==
Event	Gold	Silver	Bronze
T11	Chen Shichang; China	Di Dongdong; China	Ye Tao; China
T12	Said Najafzade; Azerbaijan	Daiki Ishiyama; Japan	Wong Kar Gee; Malaysia
T13	Orkhan Aslanov; Azerbaijan	Iván José Cano Blanco; Spain	Vegard Dragsund Sverd; Norway
T20	Abdul Latif Romly; Malaysia	Roberto Carlos Chala Espinoza; Ecuador	Jhon Obando; Colombia
T36	Evgenii Torsunov; Neutral Paralympic Athletes (NPA)	William Stedman; New Zealand	Rodrigo Parreira da Silva; Brazil
T37	Muhammad Nazmi Nasri; Malaysia	Konstantinos Kamaras; Greece	Mateus Evangelista Cardoso; Brazil
T38	Zhong Huanghao; China	Khetag Khinchagov; Neutral Paralympic Athletes (NPA)	Zhou Peng; China
T47	Robiel Yankiel Sol Cervantes; Cuba	Nikita Kotukov; Neutral Paralympic Athletes (NPA)	Hao Wang; China
T63	Léon Schäfer; Germany	Joel de Jong; Netherlands	Noah Mbuyamba; Netherlands
T64	Markus Rehm; Germany	Derek Loccident; United States	Trenten Merrill; United States
