= 2021 World Para Athletics European Championships – Men's long jump =

The men's long jump events were held on each day of the 2021 World Para Athletics European Championships in Bydgoszcz, Poland.

== Medalists ==
Event	Gold		Silver		Bronze	
T11	Ronan Pallier (FRA)	6.00 SB	Gerard Descarrega (ESP)	5.78	Toghrul Humbatov (AZE)	5.67 PB
T12	Said Najafzade (AZE)	6.97	Siarhei Burdukou (BLR)	6.81	Tobias Jonsson (SWE)	6.40
T13	Zak Skinner (GBR)	6.92 CR	Iván José Cano Blanco (ESP)	6.90 SB	Winsdom Asisosa Ikhiuwu Smith (ESP)	6.59 SB
T20	Zoran Talić (CRO)	7.20 SB	Athanasios Prodromou (GRE)	7.01	Lenine Cunha (POR)	6.55 SB
T36	Oleksandr Lytvynenko (UKR)	5.67 PB	Roman Pavlyk (UKR)	5.66 PB	Anastasios Petropoulos (GRE)	5.30 PB
T37	Vladyslav Zahrebelnyi (UKR)	6.33 ER	Chermen Kobesov (RUS)	6.14	Mateusz Owczarek (POL)	6.00 SB
T38	Khetag Khinchagov (RUS)	6.41 CR	Mykyta Senyk (UKR)	6.38	Andrei Poroshin (RUS)	6.19 PB
T47	Georgios Kostakis (GRE)	6.45 SB	Nemanja Matijasevic (SRB)	6.45	Daniel Perez Martinez (ESP)	6.40 PB
T63	Daniel Wagner (DEN)	7.15 CR	Joël de Jong (NED)	6.63 PB	Luke Sinnott (GBR)	5.61 CR
T64	Markus Rehm (GER)	8.62 WR	Dimitri Pavadé (FRA)	6.98	Marco Cicchetti (ITA)	6.72 SB
WR world record | ER European record | CR championship record | NR national record | WL world leading | EL European leading | PB personal best | SB seasonal best

== See also ==
- List of IPC world records in athletics
