= Athletics at the 2026 Commonwealth Games – Men's long jump (T20) =

Men's long jump (T20) at the 2026 Commonwealth Games
- Venue: Scotstoun Stadium, Glasgow
- Dates: 28 July (final)
- Competitors: 8 from 6 nations
- Winning distance: 7.17 m

Medalists
gold medal	Abdul Latif Romly	Malaysia
silver medal	Noah Vucsics	Canada
bronze medal	Eljoe Gotuoh	Malaysia

The men's long jump (T20) at the 2026 Commonwealth Games, as part of the athletics programme, took place in the Scotstoun Stadium on 28 July 2026. The event is open to male athletes with an intellectual disability. This is a new event on the programme. The event will feature the current world record holder from Malaysia, Abdul Latif Romley.

== Records ==
Prior to this competition, the existing records were as follows:

Men's Long jump (T20)
World record (T20)	7.67 m	Abdul Latif Romly (MAS)	28 December 2025	New Delhi, India

== Qualification ==
Para athletic event qualification is regulated by a special system organised between Commonwealth Sport and the International Paralympic Committee. Each para athletic event allowed for eight quota places, or 10 in the case of throwing events. All but one quota in each event was available on the basis of the Commonwealth Para Rankings on 31 Match 2026, to a maximum of two per Commonwealth Games Association (CGA), with the remaining quota allocated by Bipartite invitation.

This list did not set a limit on entrants, as other athletes in the same classification, but qualified directly for another event, could enter the event in question, up to a maximum (combined quota, invitation and 'separate event' quota) of three per event per CGA.

In the case of the Men's long jump (T20), one other event - the T20 men's 1500 metres - shares the classification.

== Schedule ==
The schedule is as follows:

Date	Time	Round
28 July 2026	10:00	Final

All times are British Summer Time (UTC+1)

== Results ==
=== Final ===
The men's long jump (T20) was held as a stand alone final on the morning of 28 July 2026.

Rank	Name	County	Attempts						Result	Notes
Rank	Name	County	1	2	3	4	5	6	Result	Notes
1	Abdul Latif Romly	Malaysia	x	7.08	7.17	7.1	6.94	6.74	7.17	SB
2	Noah Vucsics	Canada	6.66	6.37	6.59	6.37	x	6.57	6.66	SB
3	Eljoe Gotuoh	Malaysia	6.06	6.51	6.01	x	6.51	6.38	6.51	SB
4	Samuel Jose	England	x	5.74	5.21	6.04	x	5.98	6.04	SB
5	Eddy Capdor	Mauritius	4.08	5.6	3.99	5.84	5.93	5.84	5.93	SB
6	Louis Rabaye	Mauritius	x	5.51	5.71	x	x	5.12	5.71	SB
7	Lindsey Hendy	Australia	5.2	5.11	5.48	x	5.23	5.38	5.48	SB
—	Steven Stone	Scotland	x	x	x	r			NM	
