= Noah Vucsics =

Canadian Paralympic athlete (born 2000)

Personal information
- Nationality: Canadian
- Born: June 25, 2000 (age 26)
- Home town: Calgary, Alberta, Canada

Sport
- Sport: Para-athletics
- Disability class: T20
- Event: Long jump
Medal record
Men's para-athletics
Representing Canada
World Championships
Silver medal – second place	2023 Paris	Long jump T20
Parapan American Games
Bronze medal – third place	2023 Santiago	Long jump T20
Commonwealth Games
Silver medal – second place	2026 Glasgow	Long jump T20

Noah Vucsics (born June 25, 2000) is a Canadian para-athlete specializing in the long jump. He represented Canada at the 2024 Summer Paralympics.

== Early life and education ==
Vucsics was born in Haiti and adopted by Carolyn and Robert Vucsics at five months old. He attended James Fowler High School in Calgary.

== Career ==
Vucsics competed at the 2023 World Para Athletics Championships and won a silver medal in the long jump with a personal best and an Americas record jump of 7.35 metres. As a result, he qualified to represent Canada at the 2024 Summer Paralympics. During the Paralympics he finished in fifth place in the long jump with a jump of 7.15 metres.

In July 2026, he competed at the 2026 Commonwealth Games and won a silver medal in the long jump T20 event with a jump of 6.66 metres.
