= 2021 World Para Athletics European Championships – Men's 100 metres =

The men's 100 metres events were held on each day of the 2021 World Para Athletics European Championships in Bydgoszcz, Poland.

== Medalists ==
Event	Gold		Silver		Bronze	
T11	Athanasios Ghavelas (GRE); Guide: Sotirios Gkaragkanis	10.98 =ER	Timothée Adolphe (FRA); Guide: Bruno Naprix	10.99 PB	Gerard Descarrega Puigdevall (ESP); Guide: Guillermo Rojo Gil	11.34 PB
T12	Salum Ageze Kashafali (NOR)	10.70 CR	Roman Tarasov (RUS)	10.99	Zac Shaw (GBR)	11.10
T13	Zak Skinner (GBR)	11.10 PB	Axel Zorzi (FRA)	11.13	Philipp Handler (SUI)	11.30
RR1	Patryk Krause (POL)	25.32 PB	Jacob Birkbak (DEN)	25.75	Not awarded	
RR3	Rafi Solaiman (GBR)	17.16 PB	Lasse Kromann (DEN)	20.57	Rubén Aldas Tomas (ESP)	24.91
T33/T34	Henry Manni (FIN)	16.28	Stefan Rusch (NED)	16.69	Harri Jenkins (GBR)	18.64 SB
T35	Dmitrii Safronov (RUS)	11.77 =WR	Artem Kalashian (RUS)	11.77 =WR	Ihor Tsvietov (UKR)	11.90
T36	Evgenii Shvetsov (RUS)	12.26	Krzysztof Ciuksza (POL)	12.64	Roman Pavlyk (UKR)	12.70
T37	Andrey Vdovin (RUS)	11.53	Vladyslav Zahrebelnyi (UKR)	11.89	Chermen Kobesov (RUS)	11.92
T38	Thomas Young (GBR)	11.03 CR	Dimitri Jozwicki (FRA)	11.34 PB	Khetag Khinchagov (RUS)	11.68
T47	Michał Derus (POL)	11.00	Nikita Kotukov (RUS)	11.08 PB	Ola Abidogun (GBR)	11.31
T51	Toni Piispanen (FIN)	20.10 CR	Peter Genyn (BEL)	20.72	Helder Mestre (POR)	24.03 SB
T52	Beat Bösch (SUI)	17.66 CR	Fabian Blum (SUI)	18.26	Mario Trindade (POR)	18.79 SB
T53	Pierre Fairbank (FRA)	15.48 CR	Nicolas Brignone (FRA)	15.69	Vitalii Gritsenko (RUS)	15.87
T54	Leo-Pekka Tähti (FIN)	13.95	Kenny van Weeghel (NED)	14.33	Esa-Pekka Mattila (FIN)	14.39
T63	Daniel Wagner (DEN)	12.37 CR	Anton Prokhorov (RUS)	12.48 CR	Alessandro Ossola (ITA)	12.65 PB
T64	Olivier Hendriks (NED)	11.41	Levi Vloet (NED)	11.86	Riccardo Cottili (ITA)	11.87 PB
WR world record | ER European record | CR championship record | NR national record | WL world leading | EL European leading | PB personal best | SB seasonal best

== See also ==
- List of IPC world records in athletics
