= Athletics at the 2016 Summer Paralympics – Men's long jump =

The Men's Long Jump athletics events for the 2016 Summer Paralympics take place at the Rio Olympic Stadium from September 8. A total of 9 events are contested for 9 different classifications.

== Medal Summary ==
Classification	Gold		Silver		Bronze	
T11	Ricardo Costa de Oliveira; Brazil	6.52	Lex Gillette; United States	6.44	Ruslan Katyshev; Ukraine	6.20
T12	Hilton Langenhoven; South Africa	7.07	Kamil Aliyev; Azerbaijan	7.05	Doniyor Saliev; Uzbekistan	7.04
T20	Abdul Latif Romly; Malaysia	7.60 WR	Zoran Talic; Croatia	7.12	Dmytro Prudnikov; Ukraine	6.99
T36	Brayden Davidson; Australia	5.62	Rodrigo Parreira da Silva; Brazil	5.62	Roman Pavlyk; Ukraine	5.61
T37	Shang Guangxu; China	6.77 WR	Mateus Evangelista Cardoso; Brazil	6.53	Haider Ali; Pakistan	6.28
T38	Hu Jianwen; China	6.64	Zhong Huanghao; China	6.59	Dyan Neille Buis; South Africa	6.58
T42	Heinrich Popow; Germany	6.70	Atsushi Yamamoto; Japan	6.62	Daniel Wagner; Denmark	6.57
T44	Markus Rehm; Germany	8.21	Ronald Hertog; Netherlands	7.29	Felix Streng; Germany	7.13
T47	Roderick Townsend-Roberts; United States	7.41	Wang Hao; China	7.30	Arnaud Assoumani; France	7.11

== Results ==
=== T11 ===
The T11 event took place on 8 September.

Rank	Athlete	1	2	3	4	5	6	Best	Notes
1st place, gold medalist(s)	Ricardo Costa de Oliveira (BRA)	x	6.41	x	6.32	6.43	6.52	6.52	
2nd place, silver medalist(s)	Lex Gillette (USA)	5.01	5.39	5.95	5.61	6.44	5.93	6.44	
3rd place, bronze medalist(s)	Ruslan Katyshev (UKR)	6.15	6.18	6.20	x	x	5.90	6.20	
4	Yang Chuan-Hui (TPE)	5.81	6.10	5.78	5.99	5.06	6.12	6.12	
5	Elçin Muradov (AZE)	5.70	5.88	5.89	5.95	6.09	5.81	6.09	SB
6	Xavier Porras (ESP)	x	5.88	5.69	6.05	5.97	x	6.05	
7	Chen Xingyu (CHN)	5.74	5.66	x	5.58	5.48	5.40	5.74	
8	Mehmet Tunç (TUR)	x	x	5.66	5.58	5.48	5.40	5.66	PB
9	Firas Bentria (ALG)	5.59	5.57	5.58	-	-	-	5.59	
10	Martin Parejo Maza (ESP)	x	5.39	5.29	-	-	-	5.39	
11	Hiep Nguyen Ngoc (VIE)	x	4.08	4.07	-	-	-	4.08	

=== T12 ===
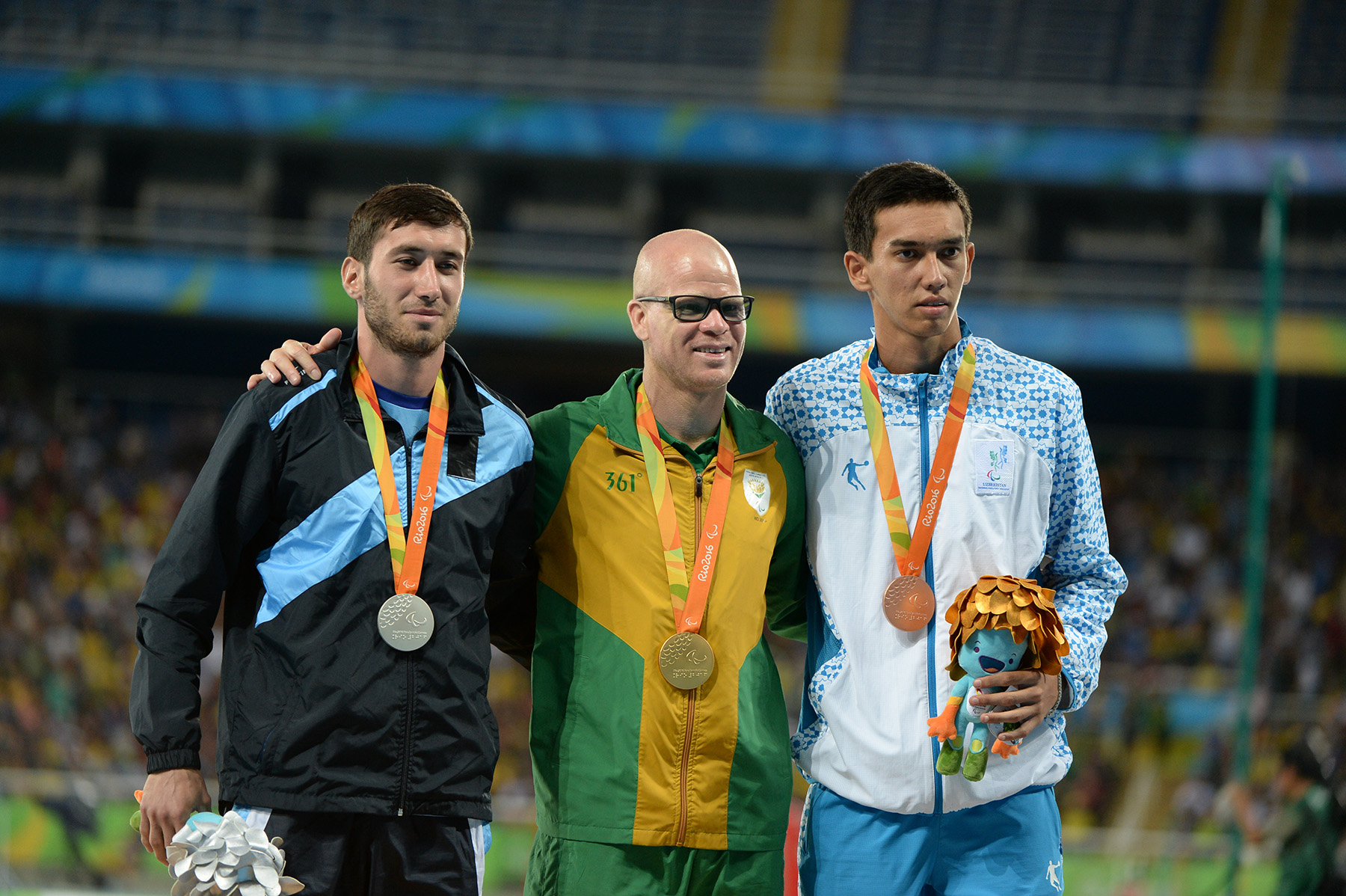
Awarding ceremony (T12). From left: Kamil Aliyev, Hilton Langenhoven and Doniyor Saliev

The T12 event took place on 10 September.

Rank	Athlete	1	2	3	4	5	6	Best	Notes
1st place, gold medalist(s)	Hilton Langenhoven (RSA)	6.86	x	7.07	6.98	6.81	6.68	7.07	SB
2nd place, silver medalist(s)	Kamil Aliyev (AZE)	6.97	7.05	7.05	6.97	7.03	5.50	7.05	
3rd place, bronze medalist(s)	Doniyor Saliev (UZB)	6.83	6.91	6.98	6.87	7.04	x	7.04	PB
4	Chen Mingyu (CHN)	6.80	6.92	6.90	6.93	7.01	7.00	7.01	
5	Siarhei Burdukou (BLR)	6.94	x	6.95	6.96	6.98	4.37	6.98	PB
6	Tobias Jonsson (SWE)	6.56	6.02	6.90	6.71	6.75	6.97	6.97	PB
7	Oleg Panyutin (AZE)	6.87	6.86	6.76	6.88	6.81	6.74	6.88	PB
8	Leinier Savon Pineda (CUB)	6.52	6.70	6.74	-	-	-	6.74	PB
9	Per Jonsson (SWE)	6.58	6.50	6.71	-	-	-	6.71	
10	Thomas Ulbricht (GER)	6.09	x	6.40	-	-	-	6.40	
11	Martin Aloisius (NAM)	6.38	6.08	6.29	-	-	-	6.38	SB
12	Biondi Misasi (SUR)	6.06	6.25	6.20	-	-	-	6.25	PB

=== T20 ===
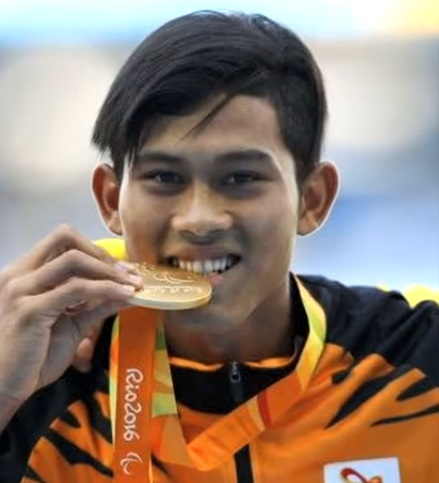
Gold medal winner

The T20 event took place on 11 September.

Rank	Athlete	1	2	3	4	5	6	Best	Notes
1st place, gold medalist(s)	Abdul Latif Romly (MAS)	x	7.47	7.54	6.79	7.60	7.49	7.60	WR
2nd place, silver medalist(s)	Zoran Talic (CRO)	7.12	x	7.07	x	7.07	x	7.12	
3rd place, bronze medalist(s)	Dmytro Prudnikov (UKR)	6.89	x	x	x	x	6.99	6.99	
4	Ranki Oberoi (NED)	x	6.93	x	6.88	6.96	x	6.96	PB
5	Nicholas Hum (AUS)	x	6.60	6.89	x	x	6.36	6.89	RR
6	Lenine Cunha (POR)	6.84	x	x	6.57	x	6.73	6.84	SB
7	Ronny Mauricio Santos Iza (ECU)	6.29	6.38	6.54	6.36	6.74	6.58	6.74	RR
8	Suhairi Bin Suhaini (SIN)	6.69	6.52	6.68	x	x	x	6.69	PB
9	Evangelos Kanavos (GRE)	x	x	6.48	-	-	-	6.48	
10	Mitsuo Yamaguchi (JPN)	x	x	5.98	-	-	-	5.98	
11	Assad Sharaheli (KSA)	4.25	x	5.96	-	-	-	5.96	
12	Damian Carcelen (ECU)	x	x	5.87	-	-	-	5.87	

=== T36 ===
The T36 event took place on 12 September.

Rank	Athlete	1	2	3	4	5	6	Best	Notes
1st place, gold medalist(s)	Brayden Davidson (AUS)	5.62	5.35	5.39	5.57	x	5.39	5.62	PR RR
2nd place, silver medalist(s)	Rodrigo Parreira da Silva (BRA)	x	5.62	5.55	5.45	5.17	5.09	5.62	=PR RR
3rd place, bronze medalist(s)	Roman Pavlyk (UKR)	5.18	5.39	5.51	5.41	5.61	5.19	5.61	PB
4	Mohamad Ridzuan Mohamad Puzi (MAS)	5.17	x	5.22	5.36	4.73	x	5.36	
5	William Stedman (NZL)	5.35	5.17	5.04	5.31	x	x	5.35	PB
6	Mariusz Sobczak (POL)	4.78	4.55	x	5.13	5.15	x	5.15	
7	Yang Yifei (CHN)	5.11	4.99	5.12	3.84	3.86	x	5.12	
8	Xu Ran (CHN)	4.95	4.66	4.74	x	x	x	4.95	

=== T37 ===
The T37 event took place on 13 September.

Rank	Athlete	1	2	3	4	5	6	Best	Notes
1st place, gold medalist(s)	Shang Guangxu (CHN)	6.52	x	6.77	-	5.91	-	6.77	WR
2nd place, silver medalist(s)	Mateus Evangelista Cardoso (BRA)	6.21	6.53	6.11	6.45	x	x	6.53	RR
3rd place, bronze medalist(s)	Haider Ali (PAK)	6.08	6.28	6.15	6.19	6.27	6.19	6.28	SB
4	Vladyslav Zahrebelnyi (UKR)	5.45	5.95	5.35	4.87	5.49	5.76	5.95	PB
5	Andrea Dalle Ave (RSA)	5.86	x	x	5.62	x	5.59	5.86	SB
6	Andrii Onufriienko (UKR)	5.35	x	5.83	5.44	x	5.40	5.83	SB
7	Mario Tataren (ARG)	5.74	5.49	5.45	5.50	5.47	5.19	5.74	SB
8	Valentin Bertrand (FRA)	5.32	5.68	5.41	5.53	x	x	5.68	
9	Ali Olfatnia (IRI)	x	x	5.52	-	-	-	5.52	SB
10	Amanat Kalkayev (KAZ)	5.35	3.99	5.31	-	-	-	5.35	
11	Jialong Wu (CHN)	5.34	x	5.30	-	-	-	5.34	
12	Ahkeel Whitehead (USA)	x	x	4.82	-	-	-	4.83	

=== T38 ===
The T38 event took place on 15 September.

Rank	Athlete	1	2	3	4	5	6	Best	Notes
1st place, gold medalist(s)	Hu Jianwen (CHN)	6.64	x	6.44	5.17	6.59	x	6.64	PR
2nd place, silver medalist(s)	Zhong Huanghao (CHN)	6.34	6.55	6.50	6.59	6.47	6.38	6.59	PB
3rd place, bronze medalist(s)	Dyan Neille Buis (RSA)	6.27	6.50	6.36	6.51	6.36	6.58	6.58	RR
4	Mohamed Farhat Chida (TUN)	6.38	6.42	6.22	4.48	6.37	6.50	6.50	PB
5	Mykyta Senyk (UKR)	6.29	6.39	6.23	6.04	6.31	6.37	6.39	RR
6	Moussa Tambadou (FRA)	x	5.34	5.42	5.55	x	x	5.55	
7	Dennis Rill (GER)	4.64	5.03	4.69	4.72	4.72	4.33	5.03	
8	Edson Pinheiro (BRA)	4.38	4.83	4.89	4.78	4.01	4.52	4.89	
9	Amir Firdauss Jamaluddin (MAS)	x	x	4.87	-	-	-	4.87	

=== T42 ===
The T42 event took place on 17 September.

Rank	Athlete	1	2	3	4	5	6	Best	Notes
1st place, gold medalist(s)	Heinrich Popow (GER)	6.70	6.54	6.61	6.58	6.55	6.33	6.70	PR
2nd place, silver medalist(s)	Atsushi Yamamoto (JPN)	x	x	6.47	6.62	6.50	6.57	6.62	=RR
3rd place, bronze medalist(s)	Daniel Wagner (DEN)	6.36	6.50	6.57	6.55	6.52	6.57	6.57	
4	Leon Schaefer (GER)	x	6.06	5.78	x	5.95	5.72	6.06	PB
5	Anil Prasanna Jayalath Yodha Pedige (SRI)	5.61	5.26	x	5.47	5.36	5.19	5.61	PB
6	Regas Woods (USA)	5.20	4.95	4.89	5.30	4.87	5.40	5.40	
7	Desmond Jackson (USA)	4.65	4.91	x	2.53	3.64	4.59	4.91	
8	Carlos Felipa (PER)	3.98	3.49	4.10	3.92	3.83	3.55	4.10	

=== T44 ===
The T44 event took place on 17 September. The event incorporates athletes from classification T43 in addition to T44

Rank	Athlete	1	2	3	4	5	6	Best	Notes
1st place, gold medalist(s)	Markus Rehm (GER)	7.13	7.33	7.48	7.98	8.04	8.21	8.21	PR
2nd place, silver medalist(s)	Ronald Hertog (NED)	7.29	7.23	7.18	7.23	x	7.18	7.29	
3rd place, bronze medalist(s)	Felix Streng (GER)	7.13	6.32	6.67	6.48	6.54	6.03	7.13	PB
4	Trenten Merrill (USA)	6.82	x	6.49	6.52	6.84	6.48	6.84	RR
5	Jean-Baptiste Alaize (FRA)	x	6.66	6.67	5.54	6.77	6.81	6.81	PB
6	Mpumelelo Mhlongo (RSA)	x	6.79	x	x	x	x	6.79	SB
7	Christos Kapellas (GRE)	6.40	x	6.03	4.01	6.13	6.09	6.40	
8	Roberto la Barbera (ITA)	6.09	6.26	6.23	x	6.23	6.32	6.32	
9	Michail Seitis (GRE)	5.12	6.08	6.20	-	-	-	6.20	PB
10	Lazaro Lazo Rodriguez (CUB)	6.08	6.05	5.79	-	-	-	6.08	
11	Maciej Lepiato (POL)	6.01	x	6.05	-	-	-	6.05	SB
12	Konstantin Veltsi (GRE)	5.59	x	5.25	-	-	-	5.59	
13	Jerome Singleton (USA)	5.29	5.30	5.56	-	-	-	5.56	

=== T47 ===
The T47 event took place on 14 September. The event incorporates athletes from classifications T45 and T46 in addition to T47

Rank	Athlete	1	2	3	4	5	6	Best	Notes
1st place, gold medalist(s)	Roderick Townsend-Roberts (USA)	7.25	7.09	6.92	x	7.41	7.26	7.41	PR RR
2nd place, silver medalist(s)	Wang Hao (CHN)	7.08	7.13	7.19	7.15	7.30	7.22	7.30	RR
3rd place, bronze medalist(s)	Arnaud Assoumani (FRA)	7.03	6.71	7.11	6.80	x	x	7.11	SB
4	Liu Fuliang (CHN)	7.06	7.03	7.09	x	6.73	6.76	7.09	SB
5	Tobi Fawehinmi (USA)	6.83	6.79	6.77	6.96	7.01	6.93	7.01	SB
6	Setyo Budi Hartanto (INA)	x	6.95	5.28	x	x	x	6.95	=PB
7	Nick Slade (USA)	6.54	x	6.82	6.36	6.39	6.46	6.82	
8	Farukh Mirzakulov (UZB)	6.66	6.78	6.65	6.53	6.54	6.55	6.78	PB
9	Chen Hongjie (CHN)	6.59	6.48	6.35	-	-	-	6.59	
10	Ettiam Calderon (CUB)	6.58	6.41	6.38	-	-	-	6.58	
11	Michal Derus (POL)	x	6.56	6.44	-	-	-	6.56	SB
12	Hajimu Ashida (JPN)	x	6.49	6.52	-	-	-	6.52	
13	Christos Koutoulias (GRE)	6.33	6.43	6.29	-	-	-	6.43	
14	Aliaksandr Subota (BLR)	5.88	5.86	x	-	-	-	5.88	
15	Ibrahim Dayabou (NIG)	5.43	3.27	5.09	-	-	-	5.43	PB
	Huseyn Hasanov (AZE)								DNS
