= Muhammad Nazmi Nasri =

Malaysian para-athlete (born 2003)

Personal information
- Nationality: Malaysian
- Born: 14 January 2003 (age 23)

Sport
- Sport: Para-athletics
- Disability: Erb's palsy
- Disability class: T37
- Event: Long jump
Medal record
Men's para-athletics
Representing Malaysia
World Championships
| Gold medal – first place | 2024 Kobe | Long jump T37 |
| Bronze medal – third place | 2025 New Delhi | Long jump T37 |

Muhammad Nazmi Nasri (born 14 January 2003) is a Malaysian para-athlete specializing in long jump. He represented Malaysia at the 2024 Summer Paralympics.

== Career ==
Nasri made his World Para Athletics Championships debut in May 2024 at the 2024 World Para Athletics Championships and won a gold medal in the long jump T37 event. He then competed at the 2024 Summer Paralympics and finished in fifth place in the long jump T37 event.

== Personal life ==
Nasri was born with Erb's palsy, which resulted in a smaller and weaker left side of his body.
