= Said Najafzade =

Azerbaijani Paralympic athlete

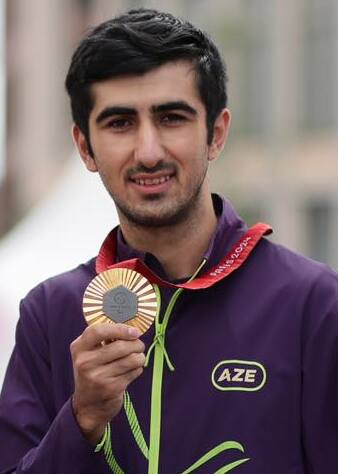
- Najafzade at the 2024 Summer Paralympics

Personal information
- Nationality: Azerbaijani
- Born: 14 January 1999 (age 27) Sumgait, Azerbaijan

Sport
- Sport: Paralympic athletics
- Disability class: T12
- Event: long jump
- Coached by: Vladimir Zayets
Medal record
Men's para-athletics
Representing Azerbaijan
Paralympic Games
Bronze medal – third place	2020 Tokyo	Long jump T12
Gold medal – first place	2024 Paris	Long jump T12
World Championships
Gold medal – first place	2024 Kobe	Long jump T12
Bronze medal – third place	2023 Paris	Long jump T12
European Championships
Gold medal – first place	2021 Bydgoszcz	Long jump T12

Said Najafzade (born 14 January 1999) is an Azerbaijani Paralympic athlete specializing in long jump. He represented Azerbaijan at the 2020 and 2024 Summer Paralympics.

== Career ==
Najafzade represented Azerbaijan in the long jump T12 event at the 2020 Summer Paralympics and won a bronze medal.

He won the bronze medal in the long jump T12 event at the 2023 World Para Athletics Championships held in Paris, France.

He represented Azerbaijan in the long jump T12 event at the 2024 Summer Paralympics and won a gold medal.

By the decree of President Ilham Aliyev dated September 10, 2024, Said Najafzade was awarded 200,000 manats for securing first place at the 2024 Summer Paralympics, while his coach received a monetary reward of 100,000 manats. Additionally, by another decree of the President on the same date, he was awarded the 1st degree For Service to the Fatherland Order.
