= Aser Ramos =

Brazilian Paralympic athlete (born 1991)

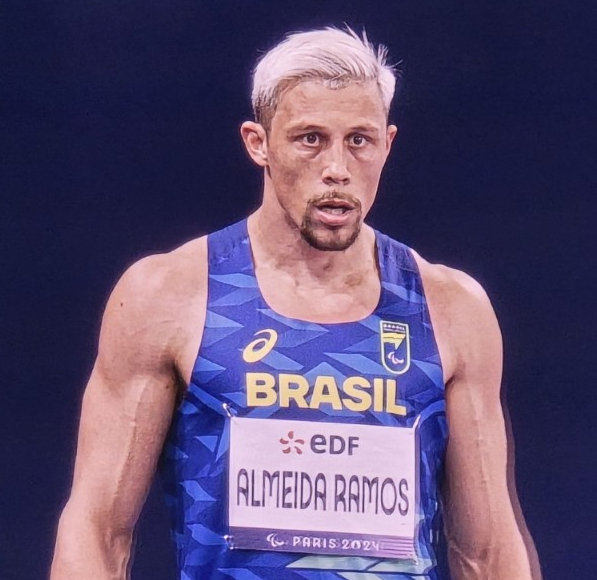
- Ramos before the 100 m start at Paris 2024

Personal information
- Full name: Aser Mateus Almeida Ramos
- Nationality: Brazilian
- Born: 23 June 1991 (age 35) Porto Alegre, Brazil

Sport
- Sport: Para-athletics
- Disability class: T36
- Event(s): long jump 100 metres
Medal record
Para-athletics
Representing Brazil
Paralympic Games
Silver medal – second place	2024 Paris	Long jump T36
Parapan American Games
Gold medal – first place	2023 Santiago	Long jump T36
Silver medal – second place	2023 Santiago	100 m T36

Aser Mateus Almeida Ramos (born 23 June 1991) is a Brazilian para-athlete.

== Career ==
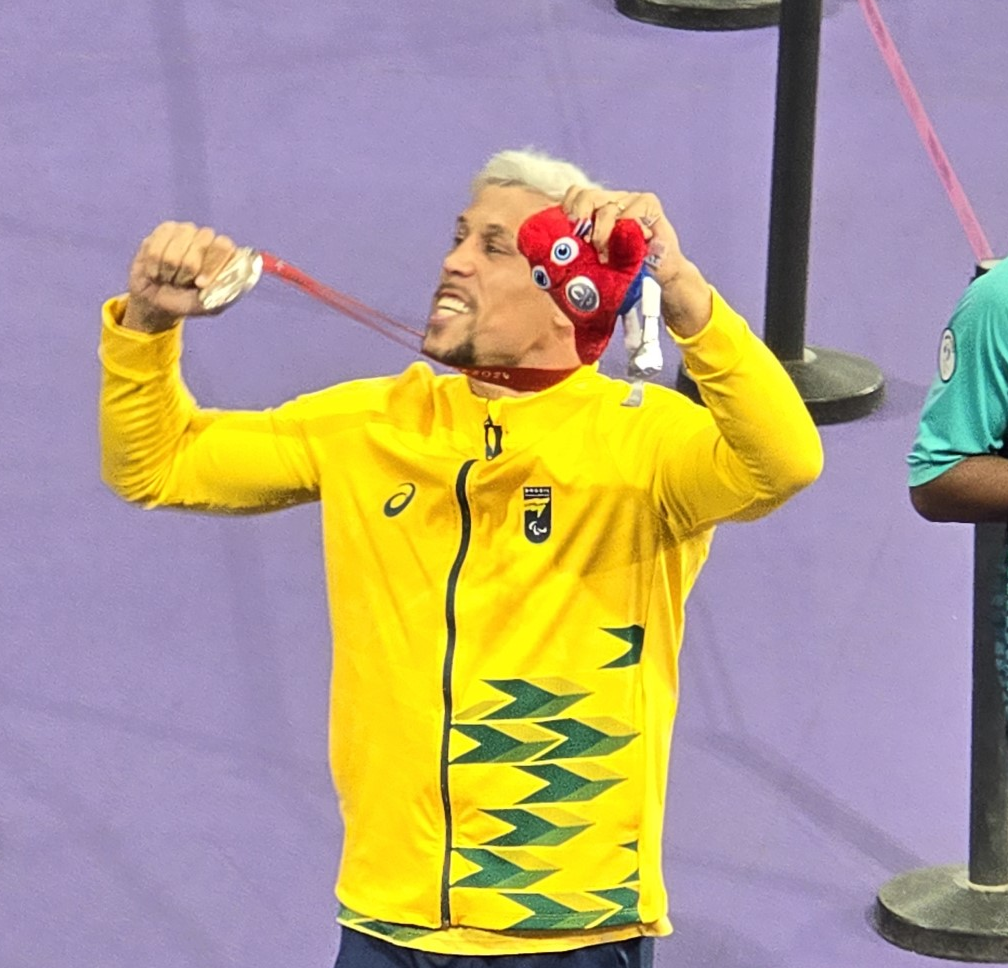
Aser Mateus Almeida Ramos showing his silver medal and the phryge on 2 September 2024

In 2023, he competed in the men's long jump T36 event at the World Para Athletics Championships held in Paris, France. He represented Brazil at the 2023 Parapan American Games and won a gold medal in the long jump and a silver medal in the 100 metre T36 events.

He represented Brazil at the 2024 Summer Paralympics and won a silver medal in the long jump T36 event.
