= Evgenii Torsunov =

Russian Paralympic athlete (born 1990)

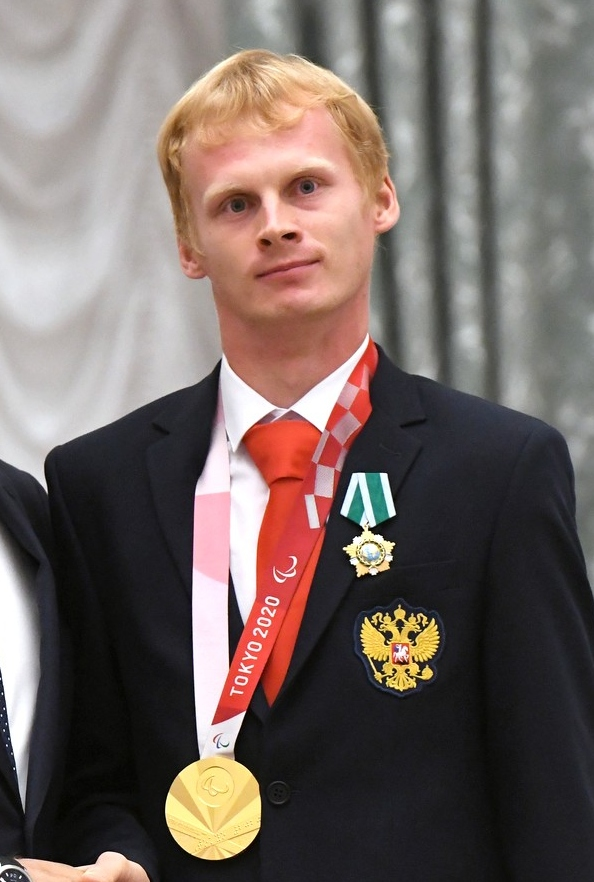
- Torsunov in 2021

Personal information
- Nationality: Russian
- Born: 30 August 1990 (age 35) Perm, Russia

Sport
- Sport: Paralympic athletics
- Disability class: T36
- Club: Perm Regional Adaptive Sports School of Paralympic Reserve
- Coached by: Tatiana Lodochnikova
Medal record
Representing RPC
Paralympic Games
Gold medal – first place	2020 Tokyo	Long jump T36
Representing Neutral Paralympic Athletes (NPA)
Paralympic Games
Gold medal – first place	2024 Paris	Long jump T36
World Championships
Gold medal – first place	2024 Kobe	Long jump T36
Gold medal – first place	2025 New Delhi	Long jump T36
Representing Russia
World Championships
Gold medal – first place	2015 Doha	Long jump T36
Gold medal – first place	2019 Dubai	Long jump T36
Silver medal – second place	2015 Doha	100 m T36
Bronze medal – third place	2015 Doha	200 m T36
European Championships
Gold medal – first place	2016 Grosseto	Long jump T36
Gold medal – first place	2016 Grosseto	100 m T36
Gold medal – first place	2016 Grosseto	200 m T36

Evgenii Sergeyevich Torsunov (Russian: Евгений Сергеевич Торсунов; born 30 August 1990) is a Russian para-athlete who specializes in long jump. He is a two-time Paralympic Games champion and four-time World Champion.

== Career ==
He represented Russian Paralympic Committee athletes at the 2020 Summer Paralympics and won a gold medal in the long jump T36 event.

He represented Neutral Paralympic Athletes at the 2024 World Para Athletics Championships and won a gold medal in the long jump T36 event.
