= Jhon Obando =

Colombian Paralympic athlete (born 2001)

Personal information
- Full name: Jhon Sebastian Obando Asprilla
- Born: 25 March 2001 (age 25)

Sport
- Country: Colombia
- Sport: Para-athletics
- Disability class: T20
- Events: 400 metres; Long jump
Medal record
Men's para-athletics
Representing Colombia
Event	1st	2nd	3rd
Paralympic Games	1	0	1
World Championships	0	1	1
Parapan American Games	1	1	0
Total	2	2	2
Paralympic Games
Gold medal – first place	2024 Paris	400 m T20
Bronze medal – third place	2024 Paris	Long jump T20
World Championships
Silver medal – second place	2024 Kobe	400 m T20
Bronze medal – third place	2024 Kobe	Long jump T20
Parapan American Games
Gold medal – first place	2023 Santiago	Long jump T20
Silver medal – second place	2023 Santiago	400 m T20

Jhon Sebastian Obando Asprilla (born 25 March 2001) is a Colombian T20 Para-athlete. He represented Colombia at the 2024 Summer Paralympics.

== Career ==
In May 2024, Obando represented Colombia at the 2024 World Para Athletics Championships and won a silver medal in the 400 metre and a bronze medal in the long jump T20 events. He then represented Colombia at the 2024 Summer Paralympics and won a gold medal in the 400 metres T20 event. He also won a bronze medal in the long jump T20 event.
