= Athletics at the 2024 Summer Paralympics – Men's long jump T47 =

Men's Long Jump T47 at the XVII Paralympic Games
- Venue: Stade de France, Paris
- Date: 3 September 2024
- Competitors: 8 from 8 nations

Medalists
1st place, gold medalist(s)		Robiel Yankiel Sol Cervantes	Cuba
2nd place, silver medalist(s)		Wang Hao	China
3rd place, bronze medalist(s)		Nikita Kotukov	Neutral Paralympic Athletes

The Athletics at the 2024 Summer Paralympics – Men's long jump T47 event at the 2024 Summer Paralympics in Paris took place on 3 September 2024.

== Classification ==
The event is open to T45, T46 and T47 athletes. These athletes have varying levels of upper limb/s affected by limb deficiency, impaired muscle power or impaired passive range of movement.

== Records ==
Prior to the competition, the existing records were as follows:

T45 Records

World record	Ren Daichang (CHN)	6.41m	(Malaysia) Kuala Lumpur	29 November 2006
Paralympic record	Ruben Alvarez (ESP)	6.75m	(United States) Atlanta	20 August 1996

T46/47 Records

World record	Robiel Yankiel Sol Cervantes (CUB)	7.84m	(Mexico) Xalapa	7 April 2024
Paralympic record	Robiel Yankiel Sol Cervantes (CUB)	7.46m	(Japan) Tokyo	31 August 2021

== Results ==
=== Final ===
The final in this classification took place on 3 September 2024:

Rank	Athlete	Nationality	Class	1	2	3	4	5	6	Best	Notes
1st place, gold medalist(s)	Robiel Yankiel Sol Cervantes	Cuba	T46	7.25	x	6.44	7.41	x	7.22	7.41	
2nd place, silver medalist(s)	Wang Hao	China	T46	7.10	7.19	7.32	7.23	7.24	7.08	7.32	SB
3rd place, bronze medalist(s)	Nikita Kotukov	Neutral Paralympic Athletes	T47	6.69	6.78	7.05	6.98	6.74	x	7.05	
4	Roderick Townsend	United States	T46	6.89	6.50	6.61	x	6.24	6.46	6.89	
5	Arnuad Assoumani	France	T47	6.71	x	6.63	6.66	x	6.77	6.77	
6	Abdulrhman Yusuf Shabib Mahmoud	Egypt	T46	6.13	6.11	6.08	5.92	6.04	6.25	6.25	
7	Yamoussa Sylla	Guinea	T47	5.70	5.61	5.16	5.14	r	—N/a	5.70	
DNS	Jutomu Kollie	Liberia	T46								DNS

Notes: r=Retired
