= Athanasios Prodromou =

Greek Paralympic athlete (born 1994)

Personal information
- Born: 3 February 1994 (age 32)

Sport
- Country: Greece
- Sport: Para-athletics
- Disability class: T20
- Event: Long jump
Medal record
Paralympic Games
Silver medal – second place	2020 Tokyo	Long jump T20
World Championships
Bronze medal – third place	2023 Paris	Long jump T20
European Championships
Silver medal – second place	2021 Bydgoszcz	Long jump T20

Athanasios Prodromou (born 3 February 1994) is a Greek Paralympic athlete. He won the silver medal in the men's long jump T20 event at the 2020 Summer Paralympics held in Tokyo, Japan. He also competed in this event at the 2024 Summer Paralympics in Paris, France.

== Career ==
Prodromou won the silver medal in the men's long jump T20 event at the 2020 Summer Paralympics held in Tokyo, Japan. A few months earlier, at the 2021 World Para Athletics European Championships in Bydgoszcz, Poland, he also won the silver medal in the men's long jump T20 event.

Prodromou won the bronze medal in the men's long jump T20 event at the 2023 World Para Athletics Championships held in Paris, France.

He also competed in the men's long jump T20 event at the 2024 Summer Paralympics in Paris, France.
