= Khetag Khinchagov =

Russian Paralympic athlete (born 1997)

Personal information
- Native name: Хетаг Хинчагов
- Nationality: Russian
- Born: 13 July 1997 (age 28) Vladikavkaz, Russia

Sport
- Sport: Para-athletics
- Disability class: T38
- Event: long jump
Medal record
Men's para-athletics
Representing Neutral Paralympic Athletes
Paralympic Games
Gold medal – first place	2024 Paris	Long jump T38
World Championships
Silver medal – second place	2019 Dubai	Long jump T38
Silver medal – second place	2024 Kobe	Long jump T38
European Championships
Gold medal – first place	2021 Bydgoszcz	Long jump T38
Bronze medal – third place	2021 Bydgoszcz	100 m T38

Khetag Khinchagov (Russian: Хетаг Хинчагов, born 13 July 1997) is a Russian para-athlete specializing in long jump.

== Career ==
In May 2024, Khinchagov competed at the 2024 World Para Athletics Championships and won a silver medal in the long jump T38 event. He then represented Neutral Paralympic Athletes at the 2024 Summer Paralympics and won a gold medal in the long jump T38 event.
