= Matvei Iakushev =

Russian Paralympic athlete (born 2003)

Personal information
- Native name: Матвей Якушев
- Nationality: Russian
- Born: 16 October 2003 (age 22) Krasnoyarsk, Russia

Sport
- Sport: Para-athletics
- Disability class: T20
- Event: long jump
- Coached by: Mikhail Petryk
Medal record
Men's para-athletics
Representing Neutral Paralympic Athletes
Paralympic Games
Gold medal – first place	2024 Paris	Long jump T20
World Championships
Bronze medal – third place	2025 New Delhi	Long jump T20

Matvei Iakushev (Russian: Матвей Якушев, born 16 October 2003) is a Russian para-athlete specializing in long jump. He represented Neutral Paralympic Athletes at the 2024 Summer Paralympics.

== Career ==
Iakushev represented Neutral Paralympic Athletes at the 2024 Summer Paralympics and won a gold medal in the long jump T20 event, defeating two-time Paralympic gold medal holder Abdul Latif Romly on his last jump attempt.
