= Vladyslav Zahrebelnyi =

Ukrainian Paralympic athlete (born 1991)

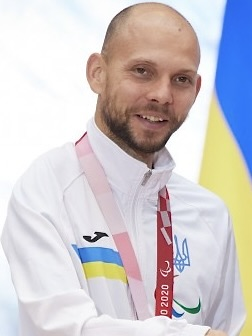

Personal information
- Nationality: Ukrainian
- Born: 28 November 1991 (age 34) Dnipro, Ukraine

Sport
- Sport: Paralympic athletics
- Disability: Cerebral palsy
- Disability class: T37
- Club: Invasport
- Coached by: Iryna Kulykova
Medal record
Men's para-athletics
Representing Ukraine
Paralympic Games
Gold medal – first place	2020 Tokyo	Long jump T37
World Championships
Silver medal – second place	2023 Paris	Long jump T37
Bronze medal – third place	2017 London	Long jump T37
Bronze medal – third place	2017 London	100 m T37
Bronze medal – third place	2019 Dubai	Long jump T37
European Championships
Gold medal – first place	2018 Berlin	Long jump T37
Gold medal – first place	2018 Berlin	100 m T37
Gold medal – first place	2021 Bydgoszcz	Long jump T37
Silver medal – second place	2018 Berlin	200 m T37
Silver medal – second place	2021 Bydgoszcz	100 m T37

Vladyslav Zahrebelnyi (born 28 November 1991) is a Ukrainian para-athlete who specializes in long jump. He represents Ukraine at elite international competitions.

== Career ==
Zahrebelnyi represented Ukraine in the men's long jump T37 event at the 2016 Summer Paralympics and finished in fourth place with a personal best jump of 5.95 metres.

Zahrebelnyi again represented Ukraine in the men's long jump T37 event at the 2020 Summer Paralympics and won a gold medal.

He won the silver medal in the men's long jump T37 event at the 2023 World Para Athletics Championships held in Paris, France.
