= Kamil Aliyev =

Azerbaijani Paralympic athlete (born 1991)

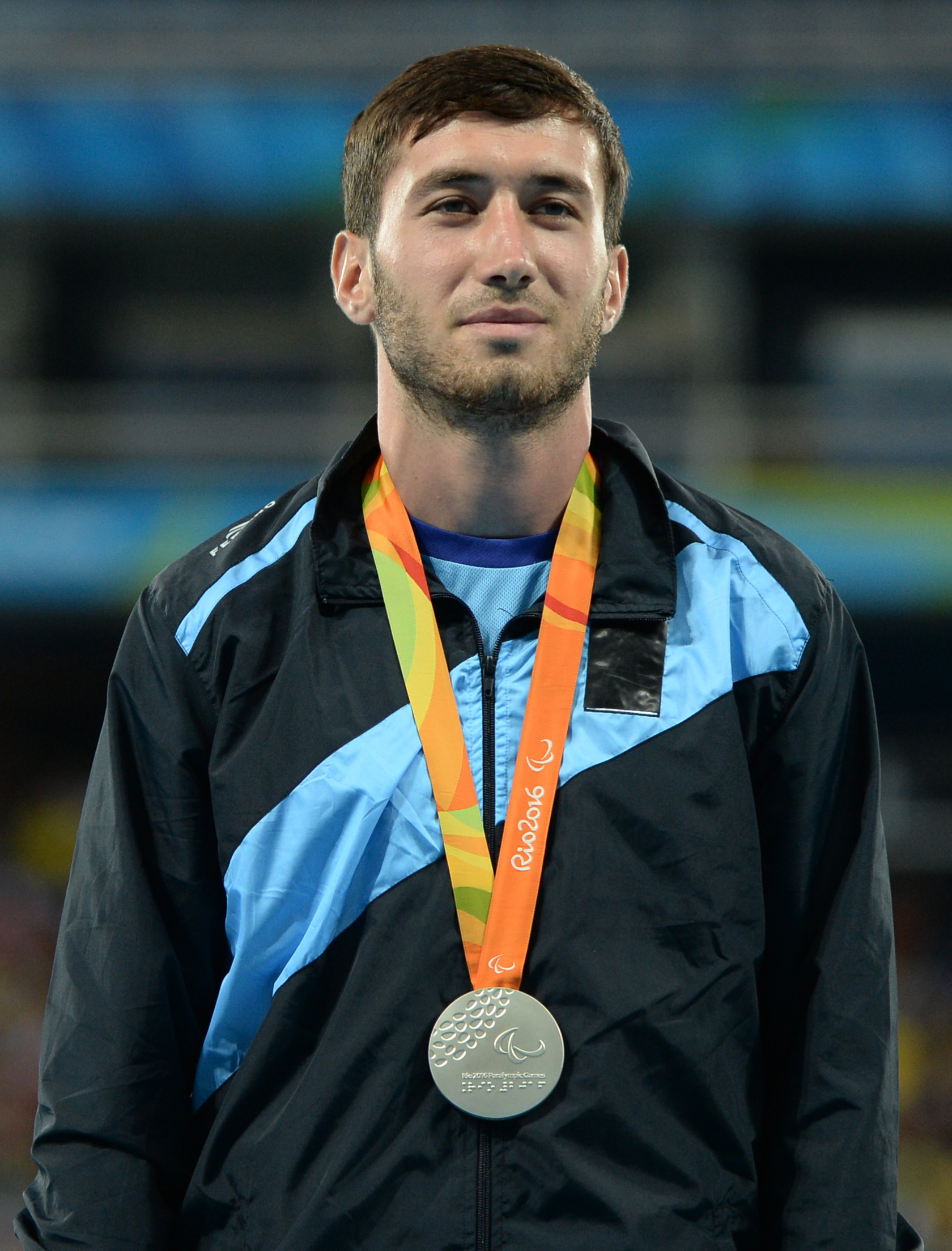

Personal information
- Born: 15 October 1991 (age 35)

Sport
- Sport: Athletics
- Disability class: F12
- Events: Long jump, sprint
Medal record
Representing Azerbaijan
Track and field
Paralympic Games
Silver medal – second place	2016 Rio de Janeiro	Long jump T12
IPC World Championships
Gold medal – first place	2015 Doha	Long jump T12
Silver medal – second place	2013 Lyon	Long jump T12
Bronze medal – third place	2019 Dubai	Long jump T12

Kamil Aliyev (born 15 October 1991) is a visually impaired athlete from Azerbaijan who competes in T12 classification long jump and sprint events. He won a silver medal in the long jump at the 2016 Summer Paralympics.
