= Vegard Dragsund Sverd =

Norwegian para athlete (born 1999)

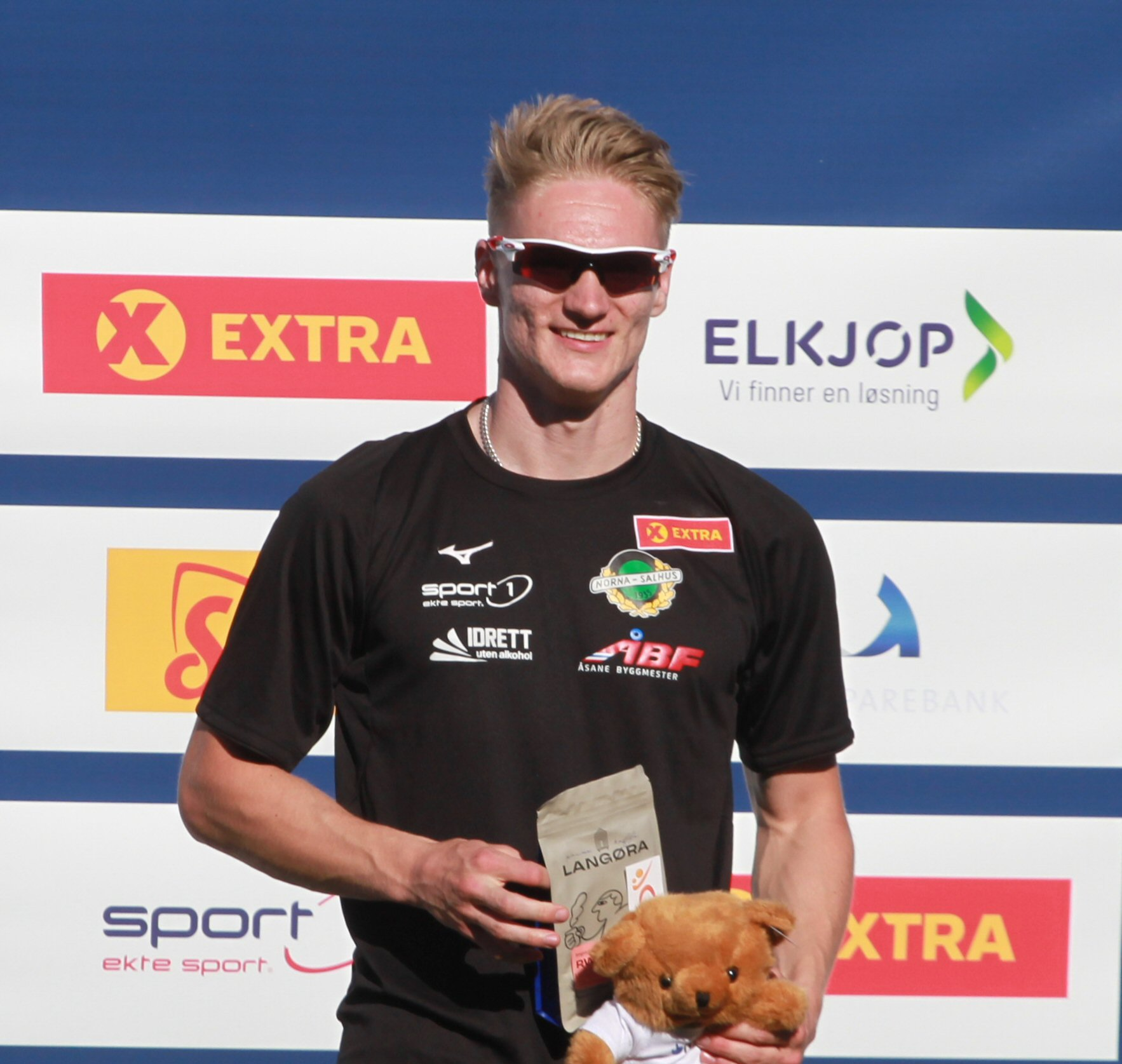
- Sverd in 2022

Personal information
- Nationality: Norwegian
- Born: 1 June 1999 (age 27)

Sport
- Sport: Para-athletics
- Disability class: T13
- Event(s): Sprints, long jump
Medal record
Men's para-athletics
Representing Norway
World Championships
| Bronze medal – third place | 2024 Kobe | Long jump T13 |
| Bronze medal – third place | 2025 New Delhi | Long jump T13 |

Vegard Dragsund Sverd (born 1 June 1999) is a Norwegian para-athlete who competes in sprints and long jump events. He represented Norway at the 2024 Summer Paralympics.

== Career ==
In May 2024, Sverd competed at the 2024 World Para Athletics Championships and won a bronze medal in the long jump T13 event. He then represented Norway at the 2024 Summer Paralympics. He was injured during the long jump T13 event, and as a result, ended with no mark.

He competed at the 2025 World Para Athletics Championships and again won a bronze medal in the long jump T13 event, with a personal best jump of 6.88 metres.
