= Robiel Yankiel Sol Cervantes =

Cuban Paralympic athlete

Robiel Sol
Personal information
- Full name: Robiel Yankiel Sol Cervantes
- Nationality: Cuban
- Born: 1 May 2003 (age 23)

Sport
- Sport: Para athletics
- Disability class: T46
- Event: Long jump
Medal record
Men's para-athletics
Representing Cuba
Paralympic Games
Gold medal – first place	2020 Tokyo	Long Jump T47
Gold medal – first place	2024 Paris	Long Jump T47
World Championships
Gold medal – first place	2023 Paris	Long jump T47
Gold medal – first place	2024 Kobe	Long jump T47
Gold medal – first place	2025 New Delhi	Long jump T47

Robiel Yankiel Sol Cervantes (born 1 May 2003) is a Cuban para-athlete specializing in long jump. He represented Cuba at the 2020 and 2024 Summer Paralympics, winning gold medals.

== Career ==
Cervantes represented Cuba in the men's long jump T47 event where he recorded a jump of 7.46 meters, setting a Paralympic record in the T47 category, and won a gold medal, Cuba's first gold medal of the 2020 Summer Paralympics.
