= Chen Shichang =

Chinese para-athlete (born 2000)

Personal information
- Nationality: Chinese
- Born: 17 August 2000 (age 26)
- Home town: Hengyang, China

Sport
- Sport: Para-athletics
- Disability class: T11
- Event: Long jump
Medal record
Para-athletics
Representing China
Paralympic Games
Silver medal – second place	2024 Paris	Long jump T11
World Championships
Gold medal – first place	2024 Kobe	Long jump T11
Silver medal – second place	2025 New Delhi	Long jump T11

Chen Shichang (born 17 August 2000) is a Chinese T11 Paralympic long jumper. He represented China at the 2024 Summer Paralympics.

== Career ==
Chen represented China at the 2024 World Para Athletics Championships and won a gold medal in the long jump T11 event with a World Para Athletics Championships record jump of 6.62 metres.

Chen represented China at the 2024 Summer Paralympics and won a silver medal in the long jump T11 event.
