= Léon Schäfer =

German Paralympic athlete (born 1997)

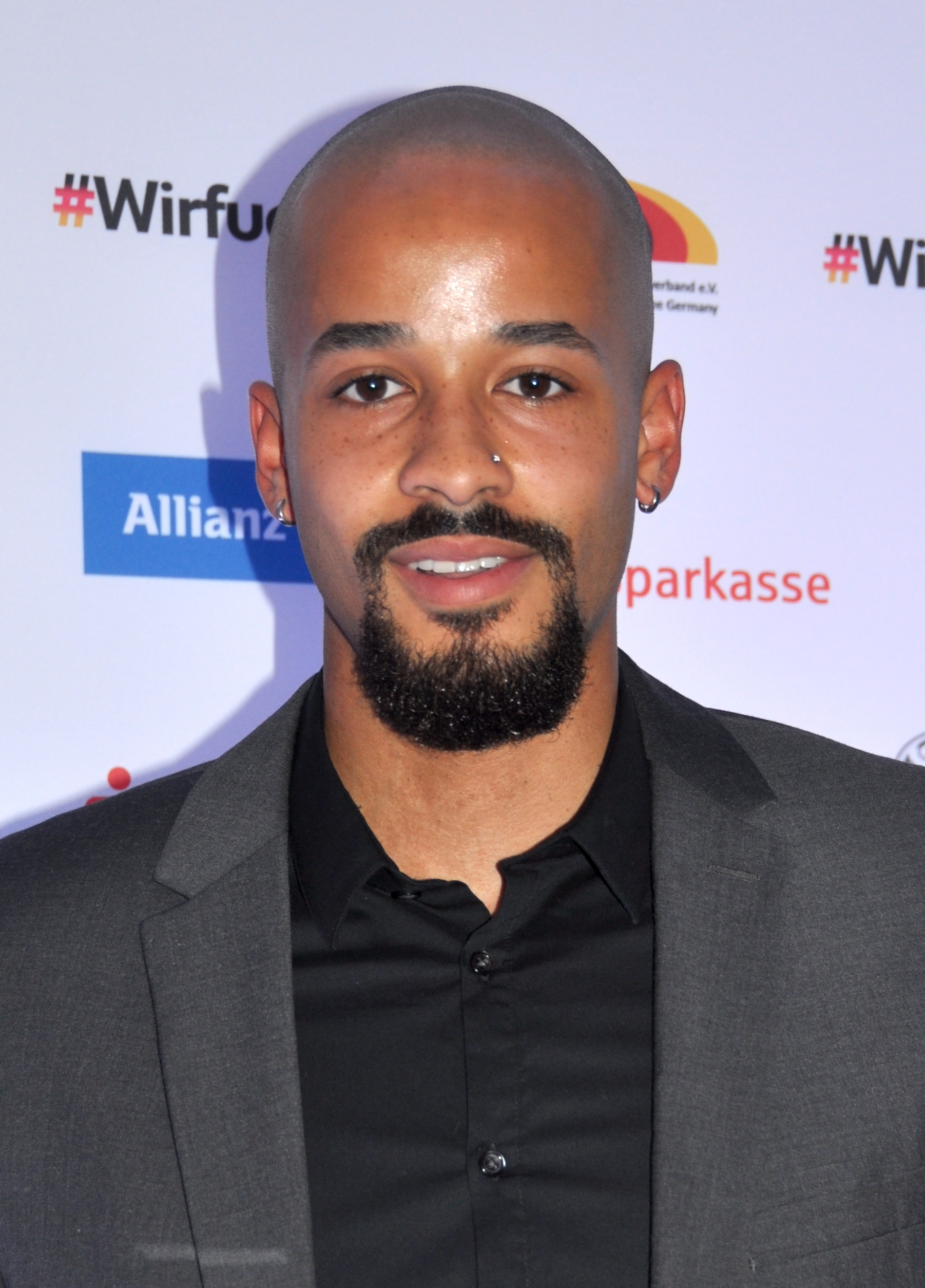
- Schäfer in 2017

Personal information
- Full name: Léon Gabrial Schäfer
- Born: 13 June 1997 (age 29) Hanover, Germany
- Home town: Bremen, Germany
- Height: 1.84 m (6 ft 0 in)
- Weight: 78 kg (172 lb)

Sport
- Country: Germany
- Sport: Paralympic athletics
- Disability: Leg amputation due to bone cancer
- Disability class: T42, T63
Medal record
Men's para athletics
Representing Germany
Paralympic Games
Silver medal – second place	2020 Tokyo	Long jump T63
Bronze medal – third place	2020 Tokyo	100 m T63
World Championships
Gold medal – first place	2017 London	4x100m relay T42-47
Gold medal – first place	2019 Dubai	Long jump T63
Gold medal – first place	2023 Paris	Long jump T63
Gold medal – first place	2024 Kobe	Long jump T63
Gold medal – first place	2024 Kobe	100m T63
Silver medal – second place	2019 Dubai	100m T63
Silver medal – second place	2025 New Delhi	Long jump T63
Bronze medal – third place	2017 London	Long jump T42
Bronze medal – third place	2023 Paris	100m T63

Léon Gabrial Schäfer (born 13 June 1997) is a German Paralympic athlete who competes in mainly sprinting and long jump events at international level events and is a current world record holder in the men's long jump T63.

== Career ==
He has represented Germany at the 2016 Summer Paralympics. He finished in fourth place at the men's long jump T42. He represented Germany at the 2020 Summer Paralympics in Tokyo, Japan. In the long jump he won a silver medal. In the 100 metres he shared a bronze medal with Jonnie Peacock.

== Personal life ==
When Schäfer was twelve years old, he went ice skating and fell and skidded along the ice. He noticed that a bump was visible on his right leg that he injured after his fall on ice, he went to see a doctor and got a biopsy of his shin bone and two months later, it was revealed that he had malignant bone cancer. After the diagnosis, he started chemotherapy and they operated on the affected bone part of his shin and inserted an iron rod but his foot didn't accept the rod and it developed gangrene and he ended up having part of his right leg to be amputated.
