= Fernando Vázquez (para-athlete) =

Argentine para-athlete (born 1999)

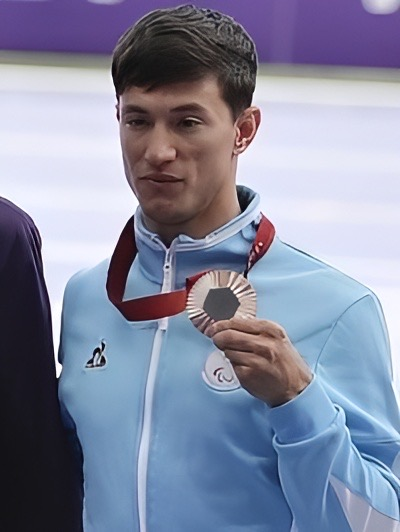
- Vázquez at the 2024 Summer Paralympics

Personal information
- Born: 20 December 1999 (age 26)

Sport
- Country: Argentina
- Sport: Para-athletics
Medal record
Men's para athletics
Representing Argentina
Paralympic Games
Bronze medal – third place	2024 Paris	Long jump T12
World Championships
Gold medal – first place	2025 New Delhi	Long jump T12

Fernando Vázquez (born 20 December 1999) is an Argentine para-athlete who specializes in the long jump. He competed at the 2024 Summer Paralympics and won a bronze medal in the men's long jump T12.
