= Abdul Latif Romly =

Malaysian Paralympic athlete

Yang Berbahagia Datuk Abdul Latif Romly PMW KMN
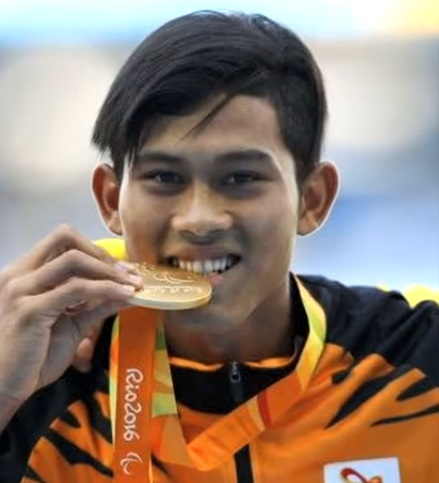
- Rio 2016 Paralympics

Personal information
- Nickname: Latif
- Nationality: Malaysian
- Born: 31 March 1997 (age 29) Perlis, Malaysia
- Height: 1.77 m (5 ft 10 in)
- Weight: 69 kg (152 lb)
- Spouse: Datin Nurul Nabila Farhana binti Musaidi (m. 2022)

Sport
- Country: Malaysia
- Sport: Para-athletics
- Disability class: T20
- Event: long jump
- Coached by: Mohd Syahrul Amri Suhaimi
Medal record
Men's para athletics
Representing Malaysia
Paralympic Games
| Gold medal – first place | 2016 Rio de Janeiro | Long jump T20 |
| Gold medal – first place | 2020 Tokyo | Long jump T20 |
| Silver medal – second place | 2024 Paris | Long jump T20 |
World Championships
| Gold medal – first place | 2015 Doha | Long jump T20 |
| Gold medal – first place | 2017 London | Long jump T20 |
| Gold medal – first place | 2023 Paris | Long jump T20 |
| Gold medal – first place | 2024 Kobe | Long jump T20 |
| Gold medal – first place | 2025 New Delhi | Long jump T20 |
| Silver medal – second place | 2019 Dubai | Long jump T20 |
Asian Para Games
| Gold medal – first place | 2014 Incheon | Long jump T20 |
| Gold medal – first place | 2018 Jakarta | Long jump T20 |
| Gold medal – first place | 2022 Hangzhou | Long jump T20 |
ASEAN Para Games
| Gold medal – first place | 2014 Naypyidaw | Long jump T20 |
| Gold medal – first place | 2015 Singapore | Long jump F20 |
| Gold medal – first place | 2017 Kuala Lumpur | Long jump T20 |
| Gold medal – first place | 2022 Surakarta | Long jump T20 |

Datuk Abdul Latif bin Romly (born 31 March 1997) is a Malaysian Paralympic athlete who broke T20 long jump world record 3 times on the same day and won Malaysia's third gold medal on 11 September at the 2016 Paralympic Games in Rio de Janeiro. He also won the gold medal in the men's long jump T20 event at the 2020 Summer Paralympics held in Tokyo, Japan. He is Malaysia's most decorated Paralympian.

== Athletics career ==
In 2015, Latif set a record-breaking 7.43 m leap to defend his T20 (intellectual disabilities) long jump gold medal at the 2015 Para Asean Games in Singapore. In 2016 Rio Summer Paralympics Games, Latif broke his own world record three times in the same day. He also earned Malaysia's third gold medal of these Paralympics Games. He was chosen as the Malaysian flag bearer at the opening ceremony.

In 2021, Latif became the first Malaysian to defend his Paralympics title in the Men's long jump (F20) event with a leap of 7.45 m. In 2023, he won the gold medal in the men's long jump T20 event at the World Para Athletics Championships held in Paris, France.

In the Paris 2024 Paralympics, Latif earned Malaysia a silver medal in the men's long jump (T20) event. He had a lead in the event until the very last round on a jump of 7.45 metres (season's best) before Russian Matvei Iakushev, competing under the neutral athlete flag, overtook him for gold with a 7.51m leap at Stade de France.

== Honours ==
=== Honours of Malaysia ===
- Malaysia
  - Officer of the Order of the Defender of the Realm (KMN) (2017)
- Federal Territory (Malaysia)
  - Commander of the Order of the Territorial Crown (PMW) – Datuk (2022)
