= Wong Kar Gee =

Malaysian Paralympic athlete (born 1991)

Personal information
- Nationality: Malaysian
- Born: 18 March 1991 (age 35) Sabah

Sport
- Sport: Track and field
- Disability class: T12/T13
Medal record
Men's para-athletics
Representing Malaysia
World Championships
Silver medal – second place	2019 Dubai	Long jump T12
Bronze medal – third place	2024 Kobe	Long jump T12
Asian Para Games
Silver medal – second place	2018 Jakarta	Long jump T12
ASEAN Para Games
Gold medal – first place	2017 Kuala Lumpur	Long jump T11/T12
Silver medal – second place	2023 Cambodia	Long jump T13

Wong Kar Gee (born 18 March 1991) is a Malaysian para athletic athlete. He represented Malaysia at the 2020 and 2024 Summer Paralympics.
