= Iván Cano (long jumper) =

Spanish Paralympic athlete (born 1995)

Personal information
- Born: Iván José Cano Blanco; 7 May 1995 (age 31) Alicante, Spain

Sport
- Country: Spain
- Sport: Para-athletics
- Disability class: T13
- Event: Long jump
Medal record
Paralympic Games
Silver medal – second place	2020 Tokyo	Long jump T13
World Championships
Gold medal – first place	2025 New Delhi	Long jump T13
Silver medal – second place	2015 Doha	Long jump T13
Silver medal – second place	2024 Kobe	Long jump T13
Bronze medal – third place	2019 Dubai	Long jump T13
European Championships
Gold medal – first place	2016 Grosseto	Long jump T13
Silver medal – second place	2014 Swansea	Long jump T13
Silver medal – second place	2021 Bydgoszcz	Long jump T13

Iván José Cano Blanco (born 7 May 1995) is a Spanish Paralympic athlete. He won the silver medal in the men's long jump T13 event at the 2020 Summer Paralympics held in Tokyo, Japan. He has also won medals in this event at the World Para Athletics Championships and the World Para Athletics European Championships.
