= Nikita Kotukov =

Russian para-athlete (born 1999)

Personal information
- Nationality: Russian
- Born: 5 May 1999 (age 27) Ulyanovsk, Russia

Sport
- Sport: Para-athletics
- Disability class: T47
- Club: Ulyanovsk Adaptive Sports School
- Coached by: Alexey Mikhalkin; Stanislav Larin
Medal record
Men's para-athletics
Representing RPC
Paralympic Games
Bronze medal – third place	2020 Tokyo	Long jump T47
Representing Neutral Paralympic Athletes (NPA)
Paralympic Games
Bronze medal – third place	2024 Paris	Long jump T47
World Championships
Silver medal – second place	2024 Kobe	Long jump T47
Silver medal – second place	2025 New Delhi	Long jump T47
Representing Russia
European Championships
Silver medal – second place	2021 Bydgoszcz	100 m T47

Nikita Kotukov (born 5 May 1999) is a Russian para athlete. He represented Russian Paralympic Committee athletes at the 2020 Summer Paralympics.

== Career ==
Kotukov represented Russian Paralympic Committee athletes at the 2020 Summer Paralympics in the men's long jump T47 event and won a bronze medal.
