= Noah Mbuyamba =

Dutch para-athlete (born 1998)

Personal information
- Born: 11 September 1998 (age 27) Maastricht, Netherlands

Sport
- Country: Netherlands
- Sport: Para-athletics
- Disability class: T63
- Event: Long jump
Medal record
Para-athletics
Representing Netherlands
Paralympic Games
| Bronze medal – third place | 2024 Paris | Long jump T63 |

Noah Mbuyamba (born 11 September 1998) is a Dutch para-athlete who specializes in the long jump. He competed at the 2024 Summer Paralympics and won a bronze medal in the men's long jump T63 event.

He competed in the men's long jump T63 event at the 2023 World Para Athletics Championships held in Paris, France.

Mbuyamba was a talented youth football player, but lost his right leg after a motorcycle accident during a holiday in Indonesia.

His brother is professional football player Xavier Mbuyamba.
