= Samson Opiyo =

Kenyan Paralympic athlete

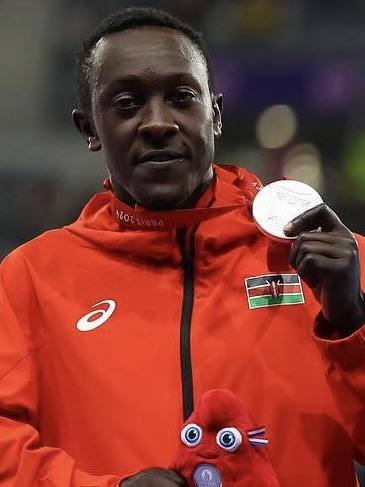

Personal information
- Nationality: Kenyan
- Born: 13 April 1996 (age 30) Nairobi, Kenya

Sport
- Sport: Para-athletics
- Disability class: T37
- Event: long jump
Medal record
Para-athletics
Representing Kenya
Paralympic Games
Silver medal – second place	2024 Paris	Long jump T37

Samson Opiyo (born 13 April 1996) is a Kenyan para-athlete specializing in long jump. He represented Kenya at the 2024 Summer Paralympics.

== Career ==
He represented Kenya at the 2024 Summer Paralympics and won a silver medal in the long jump T37 event, Kenya's first medal of the 2024 Paralympics.
