= Orkhan Aslanov =

Azerbaijani Paralympic athlete (born 1995)

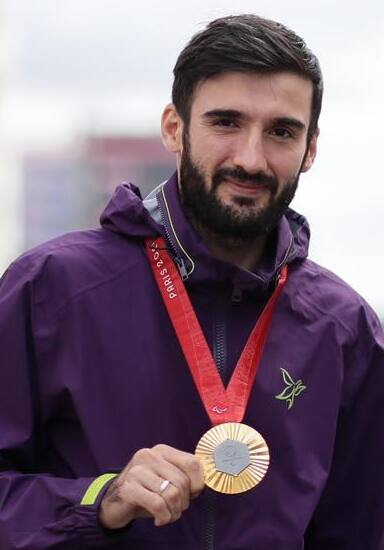
- Aslanov at the 2024 Summer Paralympics

Personal information
- Nationality: Azerbaijani
- Born: 24 March 1995 (age 31)
- Awards: Shohrat Order, 1st degree For Service to the Fatherland Order

Sport
- Sport: Paralympic athletics
- Disability class: T13
- Event: Long jump
Medal record
Men's para-athletics
Representing Azerbaijan
Paralympic Games
Gold medal – first place	2020 Tokyo	Long jump T13
Gold medal – first place	2024 Paris	Long jump T13
World Championships
Gold medal – first place	2024 Kobe	Long jump T13

Orkhan Aslanov (born 24 March 1995) is an Azerbaijani Paralympic athlete who specializes in long jump. He won the gold medal in the men's long jump T13 event at the 2020 Summer Paralympics in Tokyo, Japan and the 2024 Summer Paralympics in Paris, France.

== Career ==
=== 2021 ===
In August 2021, Orkhan Aslanov competed in the 16th Summer Paralympics held in Japan. In the long jump event, Orkhan Aslanov won the gold medal with a result of 7.36 meters.

According to the decree of the President of Azerbaijan, Ilham Aliyev, dated September 6, 2021, Orkhan Elovsat oglu Aslanov was awarded the 1st degree "For Service to the Fatherland" order for his achievements in the 16th Summer Paralympic Games and his contributions to Azerbaijani sports.

=== 2024 ===
In September 2024, Aslanov competed in the long jump event in the T13 category at the 2024 Summer Paralympics held in Paris, becoming the champion with a result of 7.29 meters.

According to a decree by President Ilham Aliyev dated September 10, 2024, he was awarded 200,000 manats for securing first place at the 17th Summer Paralympic Games, while his coach received 100,000 manats. In a separate decree issued on the same date, Aslanov was also awarded the "Shohrat" order.
