= Zak Skinner =

British Paralympic athlete (born 1998)

Personal information
- Born: 16 October 1998 (age 27)

Sport
- Country: Great Britain
- Sport: Para-athletics
- Disability class: T13
Medal record
Men's para-athletics
Representing Great Britain
World Championships
Bronze medal – third place	2023 Paris	Long jump T13
European Championships
Gold medal – first place	2021 Bydgoszcz	100 m T13
Gold medal – first place	2021 Bydgoszcz	Long jump T13
Silver medal – second place	2018 Berlin	Long jump T13

Zak Skinner (born 16 October 1998) is a British Paralympic athlete, who competes in the 100m and long jump in the T13 classification.

== Career ==
Skinner grew up in Tonbridge and Malling. He was born completely blind before gaining some sight at the age of two. He is coached by Aston Moore.

Skinner's first accolades came in 2016, winning gold medals in the IPC England 100m, 200m and long jump in the age-groups categories, and winning gold and bronze in the senior long jump and 400m, respectively.

In 2017, Skinner came 4th in the T13 long jump at the World Para Athletics Championships in London. He followed this success with a silver medal in the long jump, and 4th place in the 100m, at the 2018 European Para Championships.

In 2021, Skinner took his first gold medal on the international stage, winning the 100m at the World Para Athletics Championships in Bydgoczcz. He was subsequently selected to represent Team GB at the 2020 Tokyo Paralympics, in the T13 long jump and 100m.

In 2023, he won the bronze medal in the men's long jump T13 event at the World Para Athletics Championships held in Paris, France.

At the 2024 Summer Paralympics, Skinner placed 4th in the Long jump and 6th in the 100 metres in the T13 classification.

== Personal life ==
Skinner has ocular albinism, a genetic condition that affects vision. He is the son of former England rugby player Mickey Skinner. Away from athletics, Skinner is a DJ.
