= Ronan Pallier =

French Paralympic sprinter

Medal record

Men's para athletics (track & field)

Representing France

Paralympic Games
Bronze medal – third place	2008 Beijing	4x100m - T11-13
Bronze medal – third place	2020 Tokyo	Long Jump - T11

Ronan Pallier is a Paralympian athlete from France competing mainly in category F11 long jump and T11 sprint events.

Pallier has competed in three Paralympics, firstly in Athens in 2004 where he competed in the T13 100m, F13 long jump and was part of the French T11-13 4 × 100 m team. In Beijing in 2008 he made a second more successful appearance, after the F12 long jump he won a bronze medal as part of the French team in the T11-13 4 × 100 m relay. In 2021, at the age of 50, Pallier was crowned European champion for the first time, at the European Championships in Bydgoszcz, before claiming bronze at the 2020 Tokyo Paralympics in the T11 long jump.
