= Wang Hao (parathlete) =

Chinese Paralympic athlete (born 1995)

Personal information
- Nationality: Chinese
- Born: 1 June 1995 (age 31) Chaoyang, Liaoning, China

Sport
- Sport: Para-athletics
- Disability class: T47
- Event(s): 100 metres, Long jump
Medal record
Para-athletics
Representing China
Paralympic Games
Gold medal – first place	2024 Paris	mixed 4×100 m relay
Silver medal – second place	2016 Rio	Long jump T47
Silver medal – second place	2024 Paris	Long jump T47
World Championships
Gold medal – first place	2017 London	Long jump T47
Gold medal – first place	2019 Dubai	Long jump T47
Gold medal – first place	2024 Kobe	4×100m universal relay
Bronze medal – third place	2015 Doha	100 m T47
Bronze medal – third place	2015 Doha	200 m T47
Bronze medal – third place	2024 Kobe	100 m T47
Bronze medal – third place	2025 New Delhi	Long jump T47
Asian Para Games
Gold medal – first place	2014 Incheon	200m T47
Gold medal – first place	2018 Jakarta	100m T45/46/47
Gold medal – first place	2018 Jakarta	200m T45/46/47
Gold medal – first place	2018 Jakarta	400m T45/46/47
Gold medal – first place	2018 Jakarta	Long jump T45/46/47
Gold medal – first place	2022 Hangzhou	100m T47
Gold medal – first place	2022 Hangzhou	4×100m universal relay
Silver medal – second place	2022 Hangzhou	Long jump T47

Wang Hao (born 1 June 1995) is a Chinese T47 para-athlete.

== Career ==
Wang won silver in the long jump T47 in the 2016 Summer Paralympics and 2024 Summer Paralympics. He also participated in the 100m T47 in the 2020 Summer Paralympics and he was one of China's flag bearers.
