= List of IPC world records in athletics =

World records in disability athletics are ratified by the International Paralympic Committee (IPC). In Para-athletics competitions, athletes are given a class depending on the type and extent of their disability. The classes are as follows:

- 11–13: Blind and visually impaired
- 20: Intellectually disabled
- 32–38: Athletes with cerebral palsy; classes 32–34 compete in wheelchairs, while 35–38 are ambulant
- 40–46: Ambulant athletes with amputations or other disabilities such as dwarfism
- 51–58: Wheelchair athletes with spinal cord injuries or amputations
- 61–64: Athletes with limb differences

The IPC recognizes records for each of these classes.

Key: Awaiting ratification Defunct category not ratified or later rescinded Frozen Record (Note: Due to competition rule changes (1 January 2014) historical records for secure throwing events (F32-34/57) and the splitting of records for short statue classes (F40, F41) are marked as frozen)

== Outdoor ==
=== Men ===
==== 100 m ====
| Class | Record | Athlete | Nationality | Date | Meet | Place | Ref. |
|---|---|---|---|---|---|---|---|
| T11 | 10.82 (+1.2 m/s) | Athanasios Ghavelas | Greece | 2 September 2021 | Paralympic Games | Tokyo, Japan | |
| T12 | 10.43 (+0.2 m/s) | Salum Ageze Kashafali | Norway | 29 August 2021 | Paralympic Games | Tokyo, Japan | |
| T13 | 10.37 (+0.8 m/s) | Salum Ageze Kashafali | Norway | 15 June 2023 | Bislett Games | Oslo, Norway | |
| T20 | 10.85 | José Antonio Expósito | Spain | 26 October 2000 | Paralympic Games | Sydney, Australia | |
| T32 | 23.25 (±0.0 m/s) | Martin McDonagh | Ireland | 13 August 1999 | | Nottingham, United Kingdom | |
| T33 | 16.24 (±0.0 m/s) | John Stephen | Tanzania | 13 June 2003 | | Dar es Salaam, Tanzania | |
| T34 | 14.46 (+0.6 m/s) | Walid Ktila | Tunisia | 1 June 2019 | Daniela Jutzeler Memorial | Arbon, Switzerland | |
| T35 | 11.39 (±0.0 m/s) | Dmitrii Safronov | Russia | 30 August 2021 | Paralympic Games | Tokyo, Japan | |
| T36 | 11.72 (+0.7 m/s) | James Turner | Australia | 10 November 2019 | World Para Championships | Dubai, United Arab Emirates | |
| T37 | 10.95 (+0.3 m/s) | Nick Mayhugh | United States | 27 August 2021 | Paralympic Games | Tokyo, Japan | |
| T38 | 10.64 (+0.9 m/s) | Jaydin Blackwell | United States | 31 August 2024 | Paralympic Games | Paris, France | |
| T42 | 12.04 (−0.5 m/s) | Anton Prokhorov | Russia | 30 August 2021 | Paralympic Games | Tokyo, Japan | |
| T42 | 12.01 (+0.7 m/s) | Ntando Mahlangu | South Africa | 4 August 2017 | World Para Athletics Junior Championships | Nottwil, Switzerland | |
| T43 | 17.00 (−0.9 m/s) | Achileas Stamatiadis | Greece | 26 April 2025 | Grand Prix Marrakech | Marrakesh, Morocco | |
| T43 | 10.57 (+1.9 m/s) | Alan Fonteles Cardoso Oliveira | Brazil | 28 July 2013 | Anniversary Games | London, United Kingdom | |
| T44 | 11.00 (+1.1 m/s) | Mpumelelo Mhlongo | South Africa | 11 November 2019 | World Para Championships | Dubai, United Arab Emirates | |
| T44 | 10.61 (+1.4 m/s) | Richard Browne | United States | 29 October 2015 | IPC World Championships | Doha, Qatar | |
| T45 | 10.94 (+0.2 m/s) | Yohansson Nascimento | Brazil | 6 September 2012 | Paralympic Games | London, United Kingdom | |
| T46/T47 | 10.29 (+1.8 m/s) | Petrucio Ferreira dos Santos | Brazil | 31 March 2022 | | São Paulo, Brazil | |
| T51 | 19.13 (+1.1 m/s) | Roger Habsch | Belgium | 13 February 2024 | | Dubai, United Arab Emirates | |
| T52 | 16.01 (+0.5 m/s) | Maxime Carabin | Belgium | 2 February 2025 | Sharjah International Open Para Athletics Meeting | Sharjah, United Arab Emirates | |
| T53 | 14.10 (+0.7 m/s) | Brent Lakatos | Canada | 27 May 2017 | Swiss Nationals | Arbon, Switzerland | |
| T54 | 13.62 (±0.0 m/s) | Athiwat Paeng-nuea | Thailand | 24 May 2025 | Nottwil Grand Prix | Nottwil, Switzerland | |
| T61 | 12.73 (+0.9 m/s) | Ali Lacin | Germany | 3 July 2020 | | Berlin, Germany | |
| T62 | 10.54 (+1.6 m/s) | Johannes Floors | Germany | 10 November 2019 | World Para Championships | Dubai, United Arab Emirates | |
| T63 | 11.95 (+1.9 m/s) | Vinicius Gonçalves Rodrigues | Brazil | 25 April 2019 | | São Paulo, Brazil | |
| T64 | 10.61 (+1.4 m/s) | Richard Browne | United States | 29 October 2015 | | Doha, Qatar | |
| T71 | 21.96 (+0.8 m/s) | Artur Krzyzek | Poland | 24 May 2025 | Nottwil Grand Prix | Nottwil, Switzerland | |
| T71 | 21.96 (−0.6 m/s) | Artur Krzyzek | Poland | 2 June 2025 | | Paris, France | |
| T72 | 14.92 (−0.6 m/s) | Carlo Calcagni | Italy | 26 April 2025 | | Marrakesh, Morocco | |

==== 200 m ====
| Class | Record | Athlete | Nationality | Date | Meet | Location | Ref. |
|---|---|---|---|---|---|---|---|
| T11 | 22.41 (+1.6 m/s) | David Brown | United States | 18 April 2014 | Mt. SAC Relays | Walnut, United States | |
| T12 | 21.55 (+0.8 m/s) | Noah Malone | United States | 7 May 2021 | | Terre Haute, United States | (Note: A faster time of 21.10 by Malone at the 2022 Missouri Valley Conference outdoor track & field championships on 13 May in Des Moines, Iowa is awaiting ratification by World Para Athletics. Malone also has times of 21.30, recorded on 14 May 2022 at the aforementioned MVC meet, and a wind-legal 21.31 against non-impaired runners at the 2019 Indiana high school championships in Bloomington, Indiana.) |
| T13 | 21.05 (−0.3 m/s) | Jason Smyth | Ireland | 7 September 2012 | Paralympic Games | London, United Kingdom | |
| T13 | 21.05 (+1.7 m/s) | Jason Smyth | Ireland | 21 July 2013 | IPC World Championships | Lyon, France | |
| T20 | 21.54 | Allan Stuart | Great Britain | 14 May 2000 | | Grangemouth, United Kingdom | |
| T32 | 46.81 (±0.0 m/s) | Martin McDonagh | Ireland | 28 July 2001 | | Nottingham, United Kingdom | |
| T33 | 29.00 (+1.0 m/s) | Ahmad Almutairi | Kuwait | 2 June 2017 | World Para Athletics Grand Prix | Nottwil, Switzerland | |
| T34 | 25.91 (+0.5 m/s) | Walid Ktila | Tunisia | 1 June 2019 | | Arbon, Switzerland | |
| T35 | 23.00 (+0.3 m/s) | Dmitrii Safronov | Russia | 4 September 2021 | Paralympic Games | Tokyo, Japan | |
| T36 | 23.80 (+0.8 m/s) | James Turner | Australia | 27 January 2025 | | Canberra, Australia | |
| T37 | 21.91 (+1.0 m/s) | Nick Mayhugh | United States | 4 September 2021 | Paralympic Games | Tokyo, Japan | |
| T38 | 21.82 (−0.2 m/s) | Evan O'Hanlon | Australia | 8 September 2012 | Paralympic Games | London, United Kingdom | |
| T42 | vacant | | | | | | |
| T42 | 23.01 (+1.0 m/s) | Richard Whitehead | Great Britain | 2 June 2017 | World Para Athletics Grand Prix | Nottwil, Switzerland | |
| T43 | 39.51 (+1.0 m/s) | Achileas Stamatiadis | Greece | 10 July 2021 | Greek Championships | Thessaloniki, Greece | |
| T43 | 20.66 | Alan Fonteles Cardoso Oliveira | Brazil | 21 July 2013 | IPC World Championships | Lyon, France | |
| T44 | 22.62 (+0.5 m/s) | Mpumelelo Mhlongo | South Africa | 7 September 2024 | Paralympic Games | Paris, France | |
| T44 | 21.27 (+0.9 m/s) | Richard Browne | United States | 25 October 2015 | IPC World Championships | Doha, Qatar | |
| T45 | 21.91 (+0.2 m/s) | Yohansson Nascimento | Brazil | 22 July 2013 | IPC World Championships | Lyon, France | |
| T46/T47 | 20.83 (+1.5 m/s) | Petrucio Ferreira dos Santos | Brazil | 1 April 2022 | | São Paulo, Brazil | |
| T51 | 35.74 (+2.0 m/s) | Roger Habsch | Belgium | 15 February 2024 | World Para Athletics Grand Prix | Dubai, United Arab Emirates | |
| T52 | 27.57 (−0.3 m/s) | Maxime Carabin | Belgium | 3 February 2025 | Sharjah International Open Para Athletics Meeting | Sharjah, United Arab Emirates | |
| T53 | 25.04 (±0.0 m/s) | Brent Lakatos | Canada | 28 May 2017 | Swiss Nationals | Arbon, Switzerland | |
| T54 | 23.97 (+0.5 m/s) | Athiwat Paeng-nuea | Thailand | 5 February 2024 | Sharjah International Open Para Athletics Meeting | Sharjah, United Arab Emirates | |
| T61 | 23.03 (+0.6 m/s) | Ntando Mahlangu | South Africa | 1 August 2019 | | Nottwil, Switzerland | |
| T62 | 20.69 (−0.6 m/s) | Johannes Floors | Germany | 19 June 2022 | | Regensburg, Germany | |
| T63 | 25.12 (+0.3 m/s) | Puseletso Michael Mabote | South Africa | 24 March 2024 | | Bloemfontein, South Africa | |
| T64 | 21.27 (+0.9 m/s) | Richard Browne | United States | 25 October 2015 | | Doha, Qatar | |
| T71 | 45.50 (+1.4 m/s) | Artur Krzyżek | Poland | 11 May 2024 | | Słubice, Poland | |
| T72 | 30.41 (−2.0 m/s) | Carlo Calcagni | Italy | 24 March 2024 | | Jesolo, Italy | |

==== 400 m ====
| Class | Record | Athlete | Nationality | Date | Meet | Place | Ref. |
|---|---|---|---|---|---|---|---|
| T11 | 49.82 | Daniel Silva | Brazil | 18 November 2011 | Parapan American Games | Guadalajara, Mexico | |
| T12 | 47.47 | Serkan Yıldırım | Turkey | 23 May 2024 | World Para Championships | Kobe, Japan | |
| T13 | 46.44 | Skander Djamil Athmani | Algeria | 23 May 2024 | World Para Championships | Kobe, Japan | |
| T20 | 46.48 | Samuel Oliveira Conceição | Brazil | 24 November 2023 | Parapan American Games | Santiago, Chile | |
| T32 | 1:30.82 | Martin McDonagh | Ireland | 14 August 1999 | | Nottingham, United Kingdom | |
| T33 | 57.05 | Ahmad Al-Mutairi | Kuwait | 22 February 2023 | Sharjah International Open Meeting | Sharjah, United Arab Emirates | |
| T34 | 47.94 | Chaiwat Rattana | Thailand | 28 September 2025 | World Para Championships | New Delhi, India | |
| T35 | 56.61 | Dmitrii Safronov | Russia | 18 May 2014 | Athletics Grand Prix | Nottwil, Switzerland | |
| T36 | 51.54 | James Turner | Australia | 3 September 2024 | Paralympic Games | Saint-Denis, France | |
| T37 | 49.34 | Andrey Vdovin | Russia | 1 September 2021 | Paralympic Games | Tokyo, Japan | |
| T38 | 48.00 | Jaydin Blackwell | United States | 1 October 2025 | World Para Championships | New Delhi, India | |
| T42 | vacant | | | | | | |
| T42 | 49.92 | Ntando Mahlangu | South Africa | 5 August 2017 | World Para Junior Championships | Nottwil, Switzerland | |
| T43 | 1:22.08 | Achileas Stamatiadis | Greece | 1 June 2024 | | Thessaloniki, Greece | |
| T43 | 45.39 | Oscar Pistorius | South Africa | 28 August 2011 | World Championships in Athletics | Daegu, South Korea | |
| T44 | 52.81 | Nour Alsana | Saudi Arabia | 24 October 2023 | Asian Para Games | Hangzhou, China | |
| T44 | 49.66 | Michail Seitis | Greece | 15 September 2016 | Paralympic Games | Rio de Janeiro, Brazil | |
| T45 | 49.21 | Yohansson Nascimento | Brazil | 4 September 2012 | Paralympic Games | London, United Kingdom | |
| T46/T47 | 46.65 | Aymane El Haddaoui | Morocco | 7 September 2024 | Paralympic Games | Saint-Denis, France | |
| T51 | 1:15.23 | Edgar Navarro | Mexico | 17 December 2018 | | San Luis Potosí, Mexico | |
| T52 | 50.71 | Maxime Carabin | Belgium | 4 February 2025 | Sharjah International Open Para Meeting | Sharjah, United Arab Emirates | |
| T53 | 46.11 | Pongsakorn Paeyo | Thailand | 11 July 2023 | World Para Championships | Paris, France | |
| T54 | 43.46 | Yassine Gharbi | Tunisia | 19 March 2018 | | Sharjah, United Arab Emirates | |
| T61 | 48.31 | Ntando Mahlangu | South Africa | 21 June 2019 | | Leverkusen, Germany | |
| T62 | 45.26 | Johannes Floors | Germany | 9 August 2025 | | Oordegem, Belgium | |
| T63 | 1:00.74 | Puseletso Michael Mabote | South Africa | 31 March 2026 | SASAPD National Championships | Stellenbosch, South Africa | |
| T64 | 49.66 | Michail Seitis | Greece | 15 September 2016 | | Rio de Janeiro, Brazil | |
| T71 | 1:37.09 | Artur Krzyzek | Greece | 4 July 2025 | | Wloclawek, Poland | |
| T72 | 59.43 | Carlo Calcagni | Italy | 4 June 2025 | Handisport Open | Paris, France | |

==== 800 m ====
| Class | Record | Athlete | Nationality | Date | Meet | Place | Ref. |
|---|---|---|---|---|---|---|---|
| T11 | 1:58.47 | Odair Santos | Brazil | 6 August 2011 | 1st National Stage of Loterias Caixa Circuit | São Paulo, Brazil | |
| T12 | 1:50.02 | Egor Sharov | Russia | 22 July 2013 | IPC World Championships | Lyon, France | |
| T13 | 1:50.70 | Abdellatif Baka | Algeria | 13 May 2015 | | Seoul, South Korea | |
| T20 | 1:49.03 | Ndiaga Dieng | Italy | 22 May 2022 | | Grosseto, Italy | |
| T33 | 1:52.52 | Ahmad Almutairi | Kuwait | 25 October 2015 | IPC World Championships | Doha, Qatar | |
| T34 | 1:35.59 | Austin Smeenk | Canada | 14 June 2024 | Handisport Open Paris | Paris, France | |
| T35 | 2:29.47 | James Sands | Great Britain | 31 July 1994 | | Berlin, Germany | |
| T36 | 2:02.39 | James Turner | Australia | 17 September 2016 | Paralympic Games | Rio de Janeiro, Brazil | |
| T37 | 1:57.17 | Michael McKillop | Ireland | 21 July 2013 | IPC World Championships | Lyon, France | |
| T38 | 1:55.75 | Nathan Riech | Canada | 27 July 2023 | Canadian Track and Field Championships | Langley, Canada | |
| T38 | 1:53.87 | Nathan Riech | Canada | 9 June 2019 | Portland Track Festival | Portland, United States | |
| T42 | vacant | | | | | | |
| T43 | 4:52.67 | Record mark | | | | | |
| T44 | 2:02.65 | Nour Alsana | Saudi Arabia | 13 March 2018 | Dubai Grand Prix | Dubai, United Arab Emirates | |
| T45 | 1:59.30 | Yagonny Reis de Sousa | Brazil | 8 June 2013 | I National Stage Loterias Caixa of Athletics, Powerlifting and Swimming | São Paulo, Brazil | |
| T46 | 1:48.80 | Tahmar Upshaw | United States | 17 April 2026 | Bryan Clay Invitational | Azusa, United States | |
| T51 | 2:30.98 | Hélder Mestre | Portugal | 18 March 2018 | Sharjah International Open Meeting | Sharjah, United Arab Emirates | |
| T52 | 1:51.57 | Tomoki Sato | Japan | 21 January 2019 | | Canberra, Australia | |
| T53 | 1:31.69 | Brent Lakatos | Canada | 2 June 2019 | Swiss Nationals | Arbon, Switzerland | |
| T54 | 1:27.04 | Jin Hua | China | 5 October 2025 | World Para Championships | New Delhi, India | |
| T61 | 1:49.30 | Record mark | | | | | |
| T62 | 2:18.21 | Record mark | | | | | |
| T63 | 2:39.18 | Hajime Kondo | Japan | 23 November 2025 | | Tokyo, Japan | |
| T64 | 2:17.22 | Mitchell Joynt | New Zealand | 26 March 2022 | | Auckland, New Zealand | |
| T71 | 3:50.05 | Patryk Krause | Poland | 11 July 2024 | | Bagsværd, Denmark | |
| T72 | 2:56.52 | Deividas Podobajevas | Lithuania | 11 July 2024 | | Bagsværd, Denmark | |

==== 1500 m ====
| Class | Record | Athlete | Nationality | Date | Meet | Place | Ref. |
|---|---|---|---|---|---|---|---|
| T11 | 3:55.82 | Yeltsin Jacques | Brazil | 3 September 2024 | Paralympic Games | Saint-Denis, France | |
| T12 | 3:41.34 | Jaryd Clifford | Australia | 11 March 2021 | | Canberra, Australia | |
| T13 | 3:48.29 | Abdellatif Baka | Algeria | 11 September 2016 | Paralympic Games | Rio de Janeiro, Brazil | |
| T13 | 3:46.20 | Yassine Ouhdadi El Ataby | Spain | 3 September 2024 | Paralympic Games | Paris, France | |
| T20 | 3:44.90 | Ben Sandilands | Great Britain | 9 August 2025 | | Trafford, United Kingdom | |
| T33 | 4:21.39 | Lachlan Jones | Australia | 7 July 2005 | | New London, United States | |
| T34 | 2:57.13 | Walid Ktila | Tunisia | 3 February 2025 | Sharjah International Open Para Athletics Meeting | Sharjah, United Arab Emirates | |
| T35 | 4:52.33 | Matthew Paintin | United States | 22 July 2022 | | Westminster, United States | |
| T36 | 4:32.89 | Artyom Arefyev | Russia | 24 July 2013 | IPC World Championships | Lyon, France | |
| T37 | 3:49.89 | Amen Allah Tissaoui | Tunisia | 21 June 2026 | | Portland, United States | |
| T38 | 3:46.71 | Angus Hincksman | Australia | 9 April 2026 | Australian Championships | Sydney, Australia | |
| T44 | 4:24.67 | Record mark | | | | | |
| T44 | 4:33.46 | James Roland Ortiz | United States | 19 April 2013 | Kansas Relays | Lawrence, United States | |
| T45 | 4:08.26 | Pedro Meza Zempoaltecatl | Mexico | 20 September 2004 | Paralympic Games | Athens, Greece | |
| T46 | 3:46.51 | Michael Roeger | Australia | 4 February 2017 | Sydney Invitational | Sydney, Australia | |
| T47 | vacant | | | | | | |
| T51 | 4:53.50 | Hélder Mestre | Portugal | 18 March 2018 | Sharjah International Open Meeting | Sharjah, United Arab Emirates | |
| T52 | 3:09.11 | Maxime Carabin | Belgium | 3 February 2025 | Sharjah International Open Para Athletics Meeting | Sharjah, United Arab Emirates | |
| T53/T54 | 2:43.37 | Marcel Hug | Switzerland | 27 February 2023 | Dubai Grand Prix | Dubai, United Arab Emirates | |
| T61 | vacant | | | | | | |
| T62 | vacant | | | | | | |
| T63 | 5:33.85 | Kevin Messner | United States | 16 May 2015 | | Tempe, United States | |
| T64 | 4:33.46 | James Roland Ortiz | United States | 19 April 2013 | | Lawrence, United States | |
| T71 | vacant | | | | | | |
| T72 | 6:42.78 | Caleb Reynolds | Australia | 12 July 2024 | | Bagsværd, Denmark | |

==== 3000 m ====
| Class | Record | Athlete | Nationality | Date | Meet | Location | Ref. |
|---|---|---|---|---|---|---|---|
| T20 | 8:44.17 | Antonio Mariz | Portugal | 18 July 1999 | | Braga, Portugal | |
| T20 | 8:07.64 i | Mikey Brannigan | United States | 4 February 2017 | Armory Track Invitational | New York City, United States | |

==== 5000 m ====
| Class | Record | Athlete | Nationality | Date | Meet | Place | Ref. |
|---|---|---|---|---|---|---|---|
| T11 | 14:48.85 | Júlio Cesar Agripino | Brazil | 30 August 2024 | Paralympic Games | Saint-Denis, France | |
| T12 | 13:53.76 | El Amin Chentouf | Morocco | 3 September 2012 | Paralympic Games | London, United Kingdom | |
| T13 | 14:03.45 | Yudai Shimazu | Japan | 24 April 2026 | Grand Prix Rabat | Rabat, Morocco | |
| T20 | 14:09.51 | Michael Brannigan | United States | 15 April 2017 | Mt. SAC Relays | Torrance, United States | |
| T34 | 10:01.50 | Walid Ktila | Tunisia | 4 February 2025 | Sharjah International Open Para Athletics Meeting | Sharjah, United Arab Emirates | |
| T35 | 17:42.42 | James Sands | Great Britain | 12 September 1992 | | Barcelona, Spain | |
| T36 | 18:23.52 | Claudio Da Silva | Brazil | 12 September 1992 | | Barcelona, Spain | |
| T37 | 15:39.08 | Liam Stanley | Canada | 5 March 2022 | | Victoria, Canada | |
| T38 | 14:47.56 | Reece Langdon | Australia | 30 March 2023 | Australian Athletics Championships | Brisbane, Australia | |
| T44 | 19:51.50 | Record mark | | | | | |
| T45 | 15:37.84 | Pedro Meza Zempoaltecatl | Mexico | 27 September 2004 | Paralympic Games | Athens, Greece | |
| T46 | 13:52.05 | Michael Roeger | Australia | 12 February 2022 | | Adelaide, Australia | |
| T51 | 16:46.95 | Fabian Blattman | Australia | 29 January 1999 | | Sydney, Australia | |
| T52 | 12:27.54 | Tomoki Sato | Japan | 22 January 2019 | | Canberra, Australia | |
| T53/T54 | 9:13.81 | Marcel Hug | Switzerland | 15 February 2024 | World Para Athletics Grand Prix | Dubai, United Arab Emirates | |
| T61 | vacant | | | | | | |
| T62 | vacant | | | | | | |
| T63 | vacant | | | | | | |
| T64 | vacant | | | | | | |

==== 10000 m ====
| Class | Record | Athlete | Nationality | Date | Meet | Location | Ref. |
|---|---|---|---|---|---|---|---|
| T11 | 31:37.25 | Henry Wanyoike | Kenya | 19 September 2004 | Paralympic Games | Athens, Greece | |
| T12 | 29:38.85 | El Amin Chentouf | Morocco | 23 July 2013 | IPC World Championships | Lyon, France | |
| T13 | 28:51.00 | Yudai Shimazu | Japan | 8 July 2026 | | Abashiri City, Japan | |
| T20 | 30:37.49 | Yuki Iwata | Japan | 13 March 2022 | | Chiba City, Japan | |
| T36 | 49:10.04 | Conner Pierce | United States | 5 March 2022 | | Victoria, Canada | |
| T37 | 32:49.50 | Christoffer Vienberg | Denmark | 22 June 2019 | | Aalborg, Denmark | |
| T44 | 47:40.72 | Matteo Cappelletti | Italy | 25 October 2025 | | Jesolo, Italy | |
| T46 | 30:15.35 | Javier Conde | Spain | 7 September 1992 | | Barcelona, Spain | |
| T51 | 35:25.30 | Stefan Strobel | Germany | 1 June 2019 | | Arbon, Switzerland | |
| T52 | 25:59.13 | Thomas Geierspichler | Austria | 4 June 2005 | | Arbon, Switzerland | |
| T53/T54 | 19:45.05 | Marcel Hug | Switzerland | 27 May 2017 | Swiss Nationals | Arbon, Switzerland | |
| T61 | vacant | | | | | | |
| T62 | vacant | | | | | | |
| T63 | vacant | | | | | | |
| T64 | vacant | | | | | | |

==== 110 m hurdles ====
| Class | Record | Athlete | Nationality | Date | Competition | Location | Ref. |
|---|---|---|---|---|---|---|---|
| T20 | 15.45 | Sandor Ponyori | Hungary | 6 July 2002 | | Budapest, Hungary | |

==== 400 m hurdles ====
| Class | Record | Athlete | Nationality | Date | Competition | Location | Ref. |
|---|---|---|---|---|---|---|---|
| T20 | 55.61 | Rafal Gawronski | Poland | 7 July 2003 | | Tunis, Tunisia | |

==== High jump ====
| Class | Record | Athlete | Nationality | Date | Meet | Place | Ref. |
|---|---|---|---|---|---|---|---|
| T11 | 1.60 m | Richard Carr | Canada | 5 July 2015 | | Edmonton, Canada | |
| T12 | 2.02 m | Ruslan Sivitski | Belarus | 20 October 2000 | Paralympic Games | Sydney, Australia | |
| T13 | 2.17 m | Isaac Jean-Paul | United States | 18 July 2017 | World Para Championships | London, United Kingdom | |
| T20 | 1.94 m | Parashos Stogiannidis | Greece | 9 July 2003 | | Tunis, Tunisia | |
| T42 | 1.96 m | Arnold Boldt | Canada | 17 June 1980 | | Arnhem, Netherlands | |
| T44 | 2.19 m | Maciej Lepiato | Poland | 12 September 2016 | Paralympic Games | Rio de Janeiro, Brazil | |
| T45 | 1.73 m | Timor Huseni | Germany | 8 July 2016 | | Leverkusen, Germany | |
| T46/T47 | 2.16 m | Roderick Townsend-Roberts | United States | 11 July 2023 | World Para Championships | Paris, France | |
| T61 | vacant | | | | | | |
| T63 | 1.97 m | Ezra Frech | United States | 20 July 2024 | U.S. Paralympic Trials | Miramar, United States | |
| T64 | 2.11 m | Jeff Skiba | United States | 14 September 2008 | | Beijing, China | |

==== Long jump ====
| Class | Record | Athlete | Nationality | Date | Meet | Place | Ref. |
|---|---|---|---|---|---|---|---|
| T11 | 6.92 m (−0.9 m/s) | Di Dongdong | China | 27 September 2025 | World Para Championships | New Delhi, India | |
| T12 | 7.47 m (+0.1 m/s) | Matthias Schroeder | Germany | 12 July 2009 | | Berlin, Germany | |
| T12 | 7.47 m (+0.2 m/s) | Doniyor Saliev | Uzbekistan | 12 July 2023 | World Para Championships | Paris, France | |
| T13 | 7.66 m (−0.8 m/s) | Luis Felipe Gutierrez | Cuba | 18 November 2011 | Parapan American Games | Guadalajara, Mexico | |
| T20 | 7.67 m (−0.6 m/s) | Abdul Latif Romly | Malaysia | 28 September 2025 | World Para Championships | New Delhi, India | |
| T35 | 6.06 m (+0.3 m/s) | Guo Wei | China | 20 September 2004 | Paralympic Games | Athens, Greece | |
| T36 | 6.14 m (−0.7 m/s) | Evgenii Torsunov | Russia | 5 October 2025 | World Para Championships | New Delhi, India | |
| T37 | 6.77 m (−0.1 m/s) | Shang Guangxu | China | 13 September 2016 | Paralympic Games | Rio de Janeiro, Brazil | |
| T38 | 7.31 m (+0.6 m/s) | Zhu Dening | China | 1 September 2021 | Paralympic Games | Tokyo, Japan | |
| T42 | 5.67 m (−0.6 m/s) | Partin Muhlisin | Indonesia | 7 December 2023 | World Abilitysport Games | Nakhon Ratchasima, Thailand | |
| T42 | 6.77 m (+1.5 m/s) | Heinrich Popow | Germany | 20 August 2016 | | Hachenburg, Germany | |
| T43 | vacant | | | | | | |
| T43 | 6.21 m (+0.1 m/s) | Ioannis Sevdikalis | Greece | 17 July 2017 | | London, United Kingdom | |
| T44 | 7.12 m (+0.3 m/s) | Mpumelelo Mhlongo | South Africa | 4 September 2024 | Paralympic Games | Saint-Denis, France | |
| T44 | 8.40 m (+1.8 m/s) | Markus Rehm | Germany | 23 October 2015 | IPC World Championships | Doha, Qatar | |
| T45 | 6.41 m (+0.7 m/s) | Daichang Ren | China | 29 November 2006 | | Kuala Lumpur, Malaysia | |
| T46/T47 | 7.84 m (−0.5 m/s) | Robiel Yankiel Sol Cervantes | Cuba | 7 April 2024 | World Para Athletics Grand Prix | Xalapa, Mexico | |
| T61 | 7.17 m (−0.4 m/s) | Ntando Mahlangu | South Africa | 28 August 2021 | Paralympic Games | Tokyo, Japan | |
| T62 | 7.23 m (+0.6 m/s) | Stylianos Malakopoulos | Greece | 18 May 2023 | | Bremen, Germany | |
| T63 | 7.68 m (+0.5 m/s) | Joel de Jong | Netherlands | 31 August 2024 | Paralympic Games | Saint-Denis, France | |
| T64 | 8.72 m (+1.6 m/s) | Markus Rehm | Germany | 25 June 2023 | Internationales LAZ-Meeting | Rhede, Germany | |

==== Triple jump ====
| Class | Record | Athlete | Nationality | Date | Meet | Place | Ref. |
|---|---|---|---|---|---|---|---|
| T11 | 13.71 m (+0.2 m/s) | Li Duan | China | 12 September 2008 | Paralympic Games | Beijing, China | |
| T12 | 15.37 m (+0.5 m/s) | Osamah Alshanqiti | Saudi Arabia | 8 September 2008 | Paralympic Games | Beijing, China | |
| T13 | 16.23 m (−0.3 m/s) | Luis Felipe Gutierrez | Cuba | 6 August 2007 | | São Paulo, Brazil | |
| T20 | 14.50 m (+0.4 m/s) | Dmytro Prudnikov | Ukraine | 18 July 2017 | World Para Championships | London, United Kingdom | |
| T45 | 12.00 m (+0.0 m/s) | J Szlezak | Poland | 27 June 1984 | | New York City, United States | |
| T46/T47 | 15.29 m (−0.2 m/s) | Liu Fuliang | China | 26 October 2015 | IPC World Championships | Doha, Qatar | |

==== Club throw ====
| Class | Record | Athlete | Nationality | Date | Meet | Place | Ref. |
|---|---|---|---|---|---|---|---|
| F31 | 32.88 m | Evgenii Demin | Russia | 12 August 2023 | Summer Paralympic Games "We Are Together. Sports" | Cheboksary, Russia | |
| F32 | 46.60 m | Bo Qing | China | 10 July 2023 | World Para Championships | Paris, France | |
| F51 | 36.22 m | Musa Taimazov | Russia | 12 August 2023 | Summer Paralympic Games "We Are Together. Sports" | Cheboksary, Russia | |

==== Shot put ====
| Class | Record | Athlete | Nationality | Date | Meet | Place | Ref. |
|---|---|---|---|---|---|---|---|
| F11 | 15.26 m | David Casinos-Sierra | Spain | 20 October 2000 | Paralympic Games | Sydney, Australia | |
| F12 | 17.39 m | Volodymyr Ponomarenko | Ukraine | 28 September 2025 | World Para Championships | New Delhi, India | |
| F13 | 16.46 m | Sun Hai Tao | China | 27 October 2000 | Paralympic Games | Sydney, Australia | |
| F20 | 17.61 m | Olegsandr Yarovyi | Ukraine | 3 September 2024 | Paralympic Games | Paris, France | |
| F20 | 17.94 m (Note: Zolkefli was disqualified for arriving late to the call room. He was allowed to compete, but marked as DNS (Did Not Start). Zolkefli's best distance of 17.94m was further than the winner's.) | Muhammad Ziyad Zolkefli | Malaysia | 31 August 2021 | Paralympic Games | Tokyo, Japan | |
| F32 | 13.01 m | Liu Li | China | 13 July 2023 | World Para Championships | Paris, France | |
| F33 | 12.77 m | Cai Bingchen | China | 7 September 2024 | Paralympic Games | Paris, France | |
| F34 | 12.25 m | Ahmad Hindi | Jordan | 4 September 2021 | Paralympic Games | Tokyo, Japan | |
| F34 | 13.38 m | Scott Jones | Great Britain | 25 July 2013 | IPC World Championships | Lyon, France | |
| F35 | 17.32 m | Khusniddin Norbekov | Uzbekistan | 11 November 2019 | World Para Championships | Dubai, United Arab Emirates | |
| F36 | 17.18 m | Vladimir Sviridov | Russia | 4 September 2024 | Paralympic Games | Paris, France | |
| F37 | 17.52 m | Xia Dong | China | 5 September 2012 | | London, United Kingdom | |
| F38 | 19.22 m | José Lemos | Colombia | 19 May 2025 | | Cali, Colombia | |
| F40 | 11.60 m | Miguel Monteiro | Portugal | 27 February 2022 | Portuguese Indoor Athletics Championship | Pombal, Portugal | |
| F41 | 15.07 m | Niko Kappel | Germany | 9 May 2024 | Jump & Fly | Hechingen, Germany | |
| F41 | 14.46 m | Zhiming Wang | China | 6 September 2012 | | London, United Kingdom | |
| F42 | 17.52 m | Aled Davies | Great Britain | 22 July 2017 | World Para Championships | London, United Kingdom | |
| F43 | 19.08 m | Akeem Stewart | Trinidad and Tobago | 23 July 2017 | World Para Championships | London, United Kingdom | |
| F43 | 20.43 m | Akeem Stewart | Trinidad and Tobago | 16 March 2019 | Hurricane Invitational | Coral Gables, United States | |
| F44 | 15.73 m | Harrison Walsh | Great Britain | 9 June 2019 | World Para Athletics Grand Prix | Grosseto, Italy | |
| F44 | 18.38 m | Jackie Christiansen | Denmark | 21 August 2011 | | Olomouc, Czech Republic | |
| F45 | 7.73 m | Record mark | | | | | |
| F45 | 10.90 m | Israel del Toro | United States | 16 May 2015 | | Tempe, United States | |
| F46 | 16.80 m | Josh Cinnamo | United States | 15 November 2019 | World Para Championships | Dubai, United Arab Emirates | |
| F52 | 11.74 m | André Rocha | Brazil | 28 October 2017 | | São Paulo, Brazil | |
| F53 | 9.66 m | Giga Ochkhikidze | Georgia | 1 September 2024 | Paralympic Games | Paris, France | |
| F54 | 12.06 m | Sergei Sokulskii | Russia | 27 August 2021 | Paralympic Games | Tokyo, Japan | |
| F55 | 12.68 m | Ruzhdi Ruzhdi | Bulgaria | 9 July 2023 | World Para Championships | Paris, France | |
| F56 | 13.49 m | Olokhan Musayev | Azerbaijan | 15 September 2008 | Paralympic Games | Beijing, China | |
| F57 | 16.01 m | Yasin Khosravi | Iran | 16 July 2023 | World Para Championships | Paris, France | |
| F58 | 16.03 m | Alexey Ashapatov | Russia | 9 September 2008 | Paralympic Games | Beijing, China | |
| F61 | vacant | | | | | | |
| F62 | 7.87 m | Moreno Marchetti | Italy | 7 May 2022 | World Para Athletics Grand Prix | Jesolo, Italy | |
| F63 | 15.10 m | Tom Habscheid | Luxembourg | 10 November 2019 | World Para Championships | Dubai, United Arab Emirates | |
| F64 | 18.38 m | Jackie Christiansen | Denmark | 21 August 2011 | | Olomouc, Czech Republic | |

==== Discus throw ====
| Class | Record | Athlete | Nationality | Date | Meet | Place | Ref. |
|---|---|---|---|---|---|---|---|
| F11 | 46.24 m | Alessandro Rodrigo Silva | Brazil | 10 June 2022 | Handisport Open Paris | Paris, France | |
| F12 | 52.51 m | Sun Haitao | China | 27 September 2004 | Paralympic Games | Athens, Greece | |
| F13 | 53.61 m | Oleksandr Iasynovyi | Ukraine | 23 October 2000 | Paralympic Games | Sydney, Australia | |
| F20 | 40.69 m | Mohamed Fatnassi | Tunisia | 5 July 2003 | | Tunis, Tunisia | |
| F32 | 24.25 m | Athanasios Konstantinidis | Greece | 10 July 2022 | | Thessaloniki, Greece | |
| F32 | 22.75 m | Lahouari Bahlaz | Algeria | 27 July 2013 | IPC World Championships | Lyon, France | |
| F33 | 31.14 m | Hani Alnakhli | Saudi Arabia | 20 March 2021 | World Para Athletics Grand Prix | Tunis, Tunisia | |
| F33 | 34.65 m | Hani Alnakhli | Saudi Arabia | 8 September 2012 | Paralympic Games | London, United Kingdom | |
| F34 | 43.29 m | Record mark | | | | | |
| F34 | 49.03 m | Wany Yanzhang | China | 7 September 2012 | | London, United Kingdom | |
| F35 | 54.13 m | Guo Wei | China | 11 September 2008 | Paralympic Games | Beijing, China | |
| F36 | 42.96 m | Cuiqing Li | China | 14 May 2017 | | Beijing, China | |
| F37 | 59.75 m | Khusniddin Norbekov | Uzbekistan | 8 September 2016 | Paralympic Games | Rio de Janeiro, Brazil | |
| F38 | 57.14 m | Michael Jenkins | Great Britain | 28 April 2024 | Coventry Spring Meet | Coventry, United Kingdom | |
| F40 | 27.87 m | Matija Sloup | Croatia | 15 September 2019 | | Kruševac, Serbia | |
| F41 | 44.36 m | Bartosz Tyszkowski | Poland | 20 June 2015 | | Berlin, Germany | |
| F41 | 45.78 m | Wang Zhiming | China | 6 September 2012 | Paralympic Games | London, United Kingdom | |
| F42 | 54.14 m | Aled Davies | Great Britain | 14 June 2016 | IPC European Championships | Grosseto, Italy | |
| F43 | 63.70 m | Akeem Stewart | Trinidad and Tobago | 27 August 2019 | Parapan American Games | Lima, Peru | |
| F44 | 64.26 m | David Blair | United States | 20 May 2021 | | Tucson, United States | |
| F45 | 12.48 m | Record mark | | | | | |
| F45 | 26.87 m | Israel del Toro | United States | 14 May 2016 | | Tempe, United States | |
| F46 | 52.85 m | Erik Fabian Kaurin | Croatia | 14 July 2024 | Zagreb Open | Zagreb, Croatia | |
| F51 | 13.66 m | Mohamed Berrahal | Algeria | 16 June 2025 | World Para Athletics Grand Prix | Tunis, Tunisia | |
| F52 | 27.06 m | Rigivan Ganeshamoorthy | Italy | 1 September 2024 | Paralympic Games | Paris, France | |
| F53 | 26.62 m | Toshie Oi | Japan | 30 September 2006 | | Okayama, Japan | |
| F54 | 33.68 m | Draženko Mitrović | Serbia | 20 August 2014 | IPC European Championships | Swansea, United Kingdom | |
| F55 | 39.84 m | Nebojsa Duric | Serbia | 20 August 2018 | | Berlin, Germany | |
| F56 | 47.37 m | Claudiney Batista | Brazil | 18 June 2023 | Desafio CPB/CBAt | São Paulo, Brazil | |
| F57 | 48.55 m | Thiago Paulino dos Santos | Brazil | 11 August 2019 | | São Paulo, Brazil | |
| F57 | 49.09 m | Zheng Weihai | China | 13 September 2008 | Paralympic Games | Beijing, China | |
| F58 | 57.61 m | Alexey Ashapatov | Russia | 13 September 2008 | Paralympic Games | Beijing, China | |
| F61 | vacant | | | | | | |
| F62 | 29.86 m | Ioannis Sevdikalis | Greece | 3 June 2024 | | Thessaloniki, Greece | |
| F63 | 46.91 m | Record mark | | | | | |
| F64 | 65.86 m | Jeremy Campbell | United States | 30 May 2021 | Desert Challenge Games | Mesa, United States | |

==== Javelin throw ====
| Class | Record | Athlete | Nationality | Date | Meet | Place | Ref. |
|---|---|---|---|---|---|---|---|
| F11 | 53.99 m | Bil Marinkovic | Austria | 9 June 2010 | | Leverkusen, Germany | |
| F12 | 64.89 m | Hector Cabrera Llacer | Spain | 13 November 2019 | World Para Championships | Dubai, United Arab Emirates | |
| F13 | 74.49 m | Dan Pembroke | Great Britain | 5 September 2024 | Paralympic Games | Saint-Denis, France | |
| F20 | 55.06 m | Jesus Lucero | Mexico | 7 July 2003 | | Tunis, Tunisia | |
| F33 | 27.07 m | Erfan Rezaei Moein | Iran | 26 October 2023 | Asian Para Games | Hangzhou, China | |
| F34 | 41.16 m | Saeid Afrooz | Iran | 4 September 2024 | Paralympic Games | Saint-Denis, France | |
| F34 | 43.41 m | Mohsen Kaedi | Iran | 20 July 2013 | IPC World Championships | Lyon, France | |
| F35 | 56.07 m | Guo Wei | China | 8 September 2008 | Paralympic Games | Beijing, China | |
| F36 | 45.18 m | Paulo Souza | Brazil | 29 September 2019 | | São Paulo, Brazil | |
| F37 | 57.81 m | Xia Dong | China | 9 September 2008 | Paralympic Games | Beijing, China | |
| F38 | 63.81 m | José Lemos | Colombia | 30 August 2024 | Paralympic Games | Saint-Denis, France | |
| F40 | 39.08 m | Ahmed Naas | Iraq | 22 March 2022 | World Para Athletics Grand Prix | Dubai, United Arab Emirates | |
| F41 | 48.94 m | Sun Pengxiang | China | 25 May 2024 | World Para Championships | Kobe, Japan | |
| F42 | 61.17 m | Mahendra Gurjar | India | 25 May 2025 | World Para Athletics Grand Prix | Nottwil, Switzerland | |
| F43 | 62.09 m | Pushpendra Singh | India | 13 July 2023 | World Para Championships | Paris, France | |
| F44 | 67.03 m | Dulan Kodithuwakku | Sri Lanka | 2 September 2024 | Paralympic Games | Paris, France | |
| F45 | 19.22 m | Record mark | | | | | |
| F45 | 27.90 m | Israel del Toro | United States | 16 May 2015 | | Tempe, United States | |
| F46 | 68.60 m | Sundar Singh Gurjar | India | 25 October 2023 | Asian Para Games | Hangzhou, China | |
| F52 | 20.99 m | Rigivan Ganeshamoorthy | Italy | 30 June 2024 | Italian Championships | Brescia, Italy | |
| F53 | 24.30 m | Alphanso Cunningham | Jamaica | 26 July 2013 | IPC World Championships | Lyon, France | |
| F54 | 33.29 m | Justin Phongsavanh | United States | 19 June 2021 | U.S. Paralympic Trials | Minneapolis, United States | |
| F55 | 35.30 m | Ali Naderi | Iran | 22 September 2004 | Paralympic Games | Athens, Greece | |
| F56 | 42.74 m | Claudiney Batista dos Santos | Brazil | 12 September 2016 | Paralympic Games | Rio de Janeiro, Brazil | |
| F57 | 51.42 m | Hamed Heidari | Azerbaijan | 28 August 2021 | Paralympic Games | Tokyo, Japan | |
| F58 | 50.98 m | Mohammad Khalvandi | Iran | 8 September 2012 | Paralympic Games | London, United Kingdom | |
| F61 | vacant | | | | | | |
| F62 | 32.35 m | Konstantinos Toukochoritis | Greece | 20 July 2025 | | Serres, Greece | |
| F63 | 59.77 m | Helgi Sveinsson | Iceland | 6 May 2017 | | Rieti, Italy | |
| F64 | 73.29 m | Sumit Antil | India | 25 October 2023 | Asian Para Games | Hangzhou, China | |

==== Pentathlon ====
| Class | Record | Athlete | Nationality | Date | Competition | Location | Ref. |
|---|---|---|---|---|---|---|---|
| P11 | 2627 pts | Sergey Sevostianov | Russia | 24 October 2000 | Paralympic Games | Sydney, Australia | |
| P12 | 3403 pts | Hilton Langenhoven | South Africa | 12 September 2008 | Paralympic Games | Beijing, China | |
| P13 | 3155 pts | Vadim Kalmykov | Ukraine | 15 September 1987 | | Moscow, Russia | |
| P20 | 2999 pts | Mohamed Fatnassi | Tunisia | 7 July 2003 | | Tunis, Tunisia | |
| P36 | 1099 pts | Tommy Chasanoff | United States | 6 July 2005 | | New London, United States | |
| P37 | vacant | | | | | | |
| P37 | 1201 pts | Tando Bala | Great Britain | 6 July 2005 | | New London, United States | |
| P38 | 1764 pts | Petr Vrátil | Czech Republic | 6 July 2005 | | New London, United States | |
| P42 | 5792 pts | Fanie Lombaard | South Africa | 22 October 2000 | Paralympic Games | Sydney, Australia | |
| P44 | 4662 pts | Jeremy Campbell | United States | 11 September 2008 | Paralympic Games | Beijing, China | |
| P51 | 4330 pts | Richard Schabel | Great Britain | 20 August 2000 | | Delémont, Switzerland | |
| P52/53 | 5245 pts | Peter Martin | New Zealand | 26 August 2001 | | Jona, Switzerland | |
| P54-58 | 5806 pts | Ling Yong | China | 20 September 2004 | Paralympic Games | Athens, Greece | |

==== 4 × 100 m relay ====
| Class | Record | Athlete | Nationality | Date | Competition | Location | Ref. |
|---|---|---|---|---|---|---|---|
| T11–13 | 42.11 | Fedor Trikolich (T12); Aleksei Labzin (T13); Artem Loginov (T12); Andrey Koptev (T11) | Russia | 31 October 2015 | IPC World Championships | Doha, Qatar | |
| T20 | 44.45 | | Portugal | 6 July 2002 | | Budapest, Hungary | |
| T33–34/T51–54 | vacant | | | | | | |
| T35–38 | 44.81 | Christopher Mullins (T38); Evan O'Hanlon (T38); Tim Sullivan (T38); Darren Thrupp (T37) | Australia | 16 September 2008 | Paralympic Games | Beijing, China | |
| T42–47/T61–64 | 40.52 | Grolla; Streng; Floors; Rehm | Germany | 1 July 2022 | | Leverkusen, Germany | |
| T51–52 | 1:10.92 | | United States | 10 September 1992 | | Barcelona, Spain | |
| T53/54 | 49.89 | Zong Kai (T54); Zhao Ji (T54); Zhang Lixin (T54); Li Huzhao (T53) | China | 8 September 2008 | Paralympic Games | Beijing, China | |

==== 4 × 400 m relay ====
| Class | Record | Athlete | Nationality | Date | Meet | Place | Ref. |
|---|---|---|---|---|---|---|---|
| T11–13 | 3:27.89 | unknown | Portugal | 25 July 1998 | | Madrid, Spain | |
| T20 | 3:26.20 | | South Africa | 10 July 2001 | | Tunis, Tunisia | |
| T35–38 | 3:38.92 | Abbes Saidi (T38); Mohamed Charmi (T37); Fares Hamdi (T37); Mohamed Farhat Chida (T38) | Tunisia | 27 September 2004 | Paralympic Games | Athens, Greece | |
| T42–47/T61–64 | 3:27.00 | Danny Andrews (T44); Raphew Reed Jr. (T46); Ryan Fann (T44); Brian Frasure (T44) | United States | 27 September 2004 | Paralympic Games | Athens, Greece | |
| T51–52 | 4:35.86 | | United States | 11 September 1992 | | Barcelona, Spain | |
| T53/54 | 3:04.77 | Cui Yanfeng (T54); Liu Yang (T54); Li Huzhao (T53); Liu Chengming (T54) | China | 16 September 2016 | Paralympic Games | Rio de Janeiro, Brazil | |

=== Women ===
==== 100 m ====
| Class | Record | Athlete | Nationality | Date | Meet | Place | Ref. |
|---|---|---|---|---|---|---|---|
| T11 | 11.80 (+0.2 m/s) | Jerusa Geber dos Santos | Brazil | 2 September 2024 | Paralympic Games | Paris, France | |
| T12 | 11.40 (+0.2 m/s) | Omara Durand | Cuba | 9 September 2016 | Paralympic Games | Rio de Janeiro, Brazil | |
| T13 | 11.66 (+1.4 m/s) | Rayane Soares Da Silva | Brazil | 31 July 2025 | | São Paulo, Brazil | |
| T20 | 12.24 | Margorzata Kleemann | Poland | 3 September 2006 | | Assen, Netherlands | |
| T32 | 37.67 (±0.0 m/s) | Lindsay Wright | Great Britain | 25 July 1997 | | Nottingham, United Kingdom | |
| T33 | 19.89 (+0.3 m/s) | Shelby Watson | Great Britain | 26 May 2016 | | Nottwil, Switzerland | |
| T34 | 16.31 (+1.1 m/s) | Hannah Cockroft | Great Britain | 27 May 2023 | World Para Athletics Grand Prix | Nottwil, Switzerland | |
| T35 | 13.00 (+1.2 m/s) | Zhou Xia | China | 27 August 2021 | Paralympic Games | Tokyo, Japan | |
| T36 | 13.35 (+0.7 m/s) | Shi Yiting | China | 20 May 2024 | World Para Championships | Kobe, Japan | |
| T37 | 12.27 (+1.9 m/s) | Wen Xiaoyan | China | 21 May 2024 | World Para Championships | Kobe, Japan | |
| T38 | 12.26 (+0.8 m/s) | Karen Palomeque | Colombia | 31 August 2024 | Paralympic Games | Paris, France | |
| T42 | 14.26 (+0.8 m/s) | Karisma Evi Tiarani | Indonesia | 7 September 2024 | Paralympic Games | Paris, France | |
| T43 | vacant | | | | | | |
| T43 | 12.79 (+0.7 m/s) | Marlou van Rhijn | Netherlands | 28 May 2016 | | Nottwil, Switzerland | |
| T44 | 12.72 (+0.5 m/s) | Irmgard Bensusan | Germany | 24 May 2019 | Nottwil Grand Prix | Nottwil, Switzerland | |
| T44 | 12.72 (+1.8 m/s) | Irmgard Bensusan | Germany | 21 June 2019 | | Leverkusen, Germany | |
| T45 | 14.00 (±0.0 m/s) | Giselle Cole | Canada | 2 June 1980 | | Arnhem, Netherlands | |
| T46/T47 | 11.89 (+0.5 m/s) | Brittni Mason | United States | 12 November 2019 | World Para Championships | Dubai, United Arab Emirates | |
| T51 | 24.69 (−0.8 m/s) | Cassie Mitchell | United States | 2 July 2016 | | Charlotte, United States | |
| T52 | 18.33 (+1.3 m/s) | Tanja Henseler | Switzerland | 27 May 2023 | Nottwil Grand Prix | Nottwil, Switzerland | |
| T53 | 15.20 (+1.1 m/s) | Catherine Debrunner | Switzerland | 24 May 2025 | Nottwil Grand Prix | Nottwil, Switzerland | |
| T54 | 15.35 (+1.9 m/s) | Tatyana McFadden | United States | 5 June 2016 | | Indianapolis, United States | |
| T61 | 14.95 (+1.5 m/s) | Vanessa Low | Australia | 20 January 2020 | | Canberra, Australia | |
| T62 | 12.02 (+0.3 m/s) | Fleur Jong | Netherlands | 3 August 2025 | | Hengelo, Netherlands | |
| T63 | 13.98 (+0.6 m/s) | Ambra Sabatini | Italy | 13 July 2023 | World Para Championships | Paris, France | |
| T64 | 12.46 (+1.1 m/s) | Kimberly Alkemade | Netherlands | 7 June 2024 | World Para Athletics Grand Prix | Nottwil, Switzerland | |
| T71 | 20.08 (+1.7 m/s) | Bella Morkus | Lithuania | 10 July 2025 | | Copenhagen, Denmark | |
| T72 | 17.07 (+0.5 m/s) | Maria Strong | Australia | 9 July 2023 | | Paris, France | |

==== 200 m ====
| Class | Record | Athlete | Nationality | Date | Meet | Place | Ref. |
|---|---|---|---|---|---|---|---|
| T11 | 24.36 (+1.5 m/s) | Liu Cuiqing | China | 25 May 2024 | World Para Championships | Kobe, Japan | |
| T12 | 23.02 (+1.3 m/s) | Omara Durand | Cuba | 4 September 2021 | Paralympic Games | Tokyo, Japan | |
| T13 | 24.19 (±0.0 m/s) | Rayane Soares da Silva | Brazil | 2 August 2025 | | São Paulo, Brazil | |
| T20 | 25.01 | Lisa Llorens | Australia | 4 March 2000 | | Canberra, Australia | |
| T32 | 1:22.57 (±0.0 m/s) | Lindsay Wright | Great Britain | 15 August 1999 | | Nottingham, United Kingdom | |
| T33 | 35.04 (+0.3 m/s) | Shelby Watson | Great Britain | 27 May 2016 | | Nottwil, Switzerland | |
| T34 | 28.90 (−0.1 m/s) | Hannah Cockroft | Great Britain | 20 May 2023 | Weltklasse am See | Arbon, Switzerland | |
| T35 | 27.17 (+0.4 m/s) | Zhou Xia | China | 29 August 2021 | Paralympic Games | Tokyo, Japan | |
| T36 | 27.47 (−0.1 m/s) | Danielle Aitchison | New Zealand | 23 May 2024 | World Para Championships | Kobe, Japan | |
| T37 | 25.75 (+1.0 m/s) | Wen Xiaoyan | China | 25 May 2024 | World Para Championships | Kobe, Japan | |
| T38 | 25.07 (+1.3 m/s) | Karen Alomeque | Colombia | 18 May 2025 | | Cali, Colombia | |
| T42 | vacant | | | | | | |
| T42 | 31.73 (−0.5 m/s) | Martina Caironi | Italy | 21 June 2015 | | Berlin, Germany | |
| T43 | vacant | | | | | | |
| T43 | 25.64 (+1.8 m/s) | Marlou van Rhijn | Netherlands | 9 June 2015 | | Paris, France | |
| T44 | 26.15 (+0.6 m/s) | Irmgard Bensusan | Germany | 21 June 2019 | | Leverkusen, Germany | |
| T45 | 28.58 (+0.3 m/s) | Kumudu Priyanka Dissanayake Mudiyanselage | Sri Lanka | 17 December 2010 | | Guangzhou, China | |
| T46/47 | 24.45 (−0.6 m/s) | Yunidis Castillo | Cuba | 1 September 2012 | Paralympic Games | London, United Kingdom | |
| T51 | 44.17 (+1.9 m/s) | Cassie Mitchell | United States | 20 June 2015 | | Saint Paul, United States | |
| T52 | 33.19 (+1.6 m/s) | Michelle Stilwell | Canada | 21 January 2013 | | Canberra, Australia | |
| T53 | 27.47 (±0.0 m/s) | Catherine Debrunner | Switzerland | 26 May 2022 | World Para Athletics Grand Prix | Nottwil, Switzerland | |
| T54 | 27.18 (−0.1 m/s) | Lea Bayekula | Belgium | 31 May 2025 | Weltklasse am See | Arbon, Switzerland | |
| T61 | 36.10 (−0.9 m/s) | Erina Yuguchi | Japan | 2 September 2023 | NAGASE Cup | Tokyo, Japan | |
| T62 | 26.53 (±0.0 m/s) | Sara Andrés Barrio | Spain | 15 June 2024 | Spanish Team Championships | Madrid, Spain | |
| T63 | 29.87 (−0.6 m/s) | Ambra Sabatini | Italy | 8 May 2022 | World Para Athletics Grand Prix | Jesolo, Italy | |
| T64 | 25.29 (−0.2 m/s) | Kimberly Alkemade | Netherlands | 14 June 2024 | Handisport Open Paris | Paris, France | |
| T71 | 41.57 (−0.1 m/s) | Bella Morkus | Lithuania | 12 July 2025 | | Copenhagen, Denmark | |
| T72 | 33.83 (+1.5 m/s) | Magdalena Andruszkiewicz | Poland | 6 July 2025 | | Włocławek, Poland | |

==== 400 m ====
| Class | Record | Athlete | Nationality | Date | Meet | Place | Ref. |
|---|---|---|---|---|---|---|---|
| T11 | 56.00 | Liu Cuiqing | China | 13 May 2018 | | Beijing, China | |
| T12 | 51.77 | Omara Durand | Cuba | 17 September 2016 | Paralympic Games | Rio de Janeiro, Brazil | |
| T13 | 53.55 | Rayane Soares da Silva | Brazil | 7 September 2024 | Paralympic Games | Paris, France | |
| T20 | 54.96 | Aysel Onder | Turkey | 2 September 2024 | Paralympic Games | Paris, France | |
| T32 | 2:49.35 | Lindsay Wright | Great Britain | 26 July 1997 | | Nottingham, United Kingdom | |
| T33 | 1:10.15 | Shelby Watson | Great Britain | 26 May 2016 | | Nottwil, Switzerland | |
| T34 | 52.80 | Hannah Cockroft | Great Britain | 22 February 2023 | Sharjah International Open Athletics Meeting | Sharjah, United Arab Emirates | |
| T35 | 1:14.69 | Oxana Corso | Italy | 7 May 2016 | | Rieti, Italy | |
| T36 | 1:06.96 | Wang Fang | China | 27 September 2004 | Paralympic Games | Athens, Greece | |
| T37 | 1:00.29 | Georgina Hermitage | Great Britain | 20 July 2017 | World Para Championships | London, United Kingdom | |
| T38 | 58.67 | Karen Palomeque | Colombia | 7 September 2024 | Paralympic Games | Paris, France | |
| T42 | vacant | | | | | | |
| T42 | 1:28.76 | Gitte Haenen | Belgium | 5 June 2017 | | Nottwil, Switzerland | |
| T43 | vacant | | | | | | |
| T43 | 1:00.78 | Marlou van Rhijn | The Netherlands | 18 May 2014 | | Nottwil, Switzerland | |
| T44 | 1:00.07 | Record mark | | | | | |
| T44 | 59.27 | Marie-Amelie le Fur | France | 12 September 2016 | Paralympic Games | Rio de Janeiro, Brazil | |
| T45 | 1:07.19 | Nelya Schasfoort | United States | 3 August 2019 | World Junior Championships | Nottwil, Switzerland | |
| T46/47 | 55.60 | Anrune Weyers | South Africa | 24 August 2019 | Flanders Cup | Huizingen, Belgium | |
| T51 | 1:36.44 | Cassie Mitchell | United States | 2 July 2016 | | Charlotte, United States | |
| T52 | 1:04.87 | Marieke Vervoort | Belgium | 14 July 2013 | | Kortrijk, Belgium | |
| T53 | 49.02 | Catherine Debrunner | Switzerland | 31 May 2025 | Weltklasse am See | Arbon, Switzerland | |
| T54 | 50.46 | Tatyana McFadden | United States | 31 May 2025 | Weltklasse am See | Arbon, Switzerland | |
| T61 | vacant | | | | | | |
| T62 | vacant | | | | | | |
| T63 | 1:19.72 | Asumi Yasuda | Japan | 8 June 2024 | | Mie, Japan | |
| T64 | 59.27 | Marie-Amélie Le Fur | France | 12 September 2016 | Paralympic Games | Rio de Janeiro, Brazil | |
| T71 | 2:07.81 | Marika Vaihinger | Sweden | 19 August 2023 | | Lillestrøm, Norway | |
| T72 | 1:13.32 | Magdalena Andruszkiewicz | Poland | 4 June 2025 | World Para Athletics Grand Prix | Paris, France | |

==== 800 m ====
| Class | Record | Athlete | Nationality | Date | Meet | Place | Ref. |
|---|---|---|---|---|---|---|---|
| T11 | 2:17.66 | Tracey Hinton | Great Britain | 11 August 2003 | | Quebec City, Canada | |
| T12 | 2:04.96 | Assia El Hannouni | France | 9 September 2008 | Paralympic Games | Beijing, China | |
| T13 | 2:03.18 | Marla Runyan | United States | 1 January 1999 | | Boston, United States | |
| T20 | 2:15.79 | Barbara Niewiedział | Poland | 23 August 2018 | European Championships | Berlin, Germany | |
| T20 | 2:08.40 | Barbara Bieganowska | Poland | 25 October 2000 | Paralympic Games | Sydney, Australia | |
| T33 | 2:22.85 | Shelby Watson | Great Britain | 27 May 2016 | | Nottwil, Switzerland | |
| T34 | 1:44.43 | Hannah Cockroft | Great Britain | 20 February 2023 | Sharjah International Open Meeting | Sharjah, United Arab Emirates | |
| T35 | 3:13.47 | Delaney Nolin | United States | 24 June 2018 | | Los Angeles, United States | |
| T36 | 2:50.61 | Tamsin Colley | Australia | 12 April 2025 | | Perth, Australia | |
| T37 | 2:41.71 | Liezel Gouws | South Africa | 1 April 2018 | | Bloemfontein, South Africa | |
| T38 | 2:35.83 | Arina Nicolaisen | South Africa | 4 August 2019 | World Junior Championships | Nottwil, Switzerland | |
| T43 | vacant | | | | | | |
| T44 | vacant | | | | | | |
| T44 | 2:22.28 | Grace Norman | United States | 28 April 2016 | | Harbor Heights, United States | |
| T45 | vacant | | | | | | |
| T46 | 2:12.42 | Lioubov Vassilieva | Russia | 24 July 2002 | | Villeneuve d'Ascq, France | |
| T51 | 3:15.64 | Cassie Mitchell | United States | 12 May 2017 | | Tempe, United States | |
| T52 | 2:06.76 | Marieke Vervoort | Belgium | 30 May 2015 | | Oordegem, Belgium | |
| T53 | 1:37.96 | Catherine Debrunner | Switzerland | 4 February 2024 | Sharjah International Open Para Athletics Meeting | Sharjah, United Arab Emirates | |
| T54 | 1:41.47 | Manuela Schär | Switzerland | 18 August 2019 | | Nottwil, Switzerland | |
| T61 | vacant | | | | | | |
| T62 | 2:57.81 | Record mark | | | | | |
| T63 | vacant | | | | | | |
| T64 | 2:22.28 | Grace Norman | United States | 28 April 2016 | Wayne Invitational | Huber Heights, United States | |
| T71 | 5:52.45 | Amy Tobin | Australia | 11 July 2027 | | Bagsværd, Denmark | |
| T72 | 2:44.75 | Gerlinda van Leussen Huizing | Netherlands | 11 July 2027 | | Bagsværd, Denmark | |

==== 1500 m ====
| Class | Record | Athlete | Nationality | Date | Meet | Place | Ref. |
|---|---|---|---|---|---|---|---|
| T11 | 4:27.68 | Yayesh Gate Tesfaw | Ethiopia | 2 September 2024 | Paralympic Games | Paris, France | |
| T12 | 4:19.20 | Assia El Hannouni | France | 14 September 2008 | Paralympic Games | Beijing, China | |
| T13 | 4:05.27 | Marla Runyan | United States | 1 January 1999 | | Seville, Spain | |
| T20 | 4:23.37 | Barbara Niewiedział | Poland | 28 June 2012 | | Stadskanaal, Netherlands | |
| T33 | 4:55.85 | Shelby Watson | Great Britain | 15 August 2015 | | Nottingham, United Kingdom | |
| T34 | 3:21.06 | Hannah Cockroft | Great Britain | 21 February 2023 | Sharjah International Open Athletics Meeting | Sharjah, United Arab Emirates | |
| T35 | 7:44.06 | Record mark | | | | | |
| T36 | 6:26.30 | Susan Suchan | Canada | 11 August 1995 | | Saint John, Canada | |
| T37 | 5:40.12 | Siw Verstengen | Norway | 28 July 1994 | | Berlin, Germany | |
| T38 | 5:28.51 | Maria Fernandes | Portugal | 26 July 2001 | | Nottingham, United Kingdom | |
| T44 | vacant | | | | | | |
| T44 | 4:58.68 | Grace Norman | United States | 28 June 2015 | | Indianapolis, United States | |
| T45 | vacant | | | | | | |
| T46 | 4:50.08 | Li Chun Mei | China | 29 November 2006 | | Kuala Lumpur, Malaysia | |
| T51 | 6:25.19 | Cassie Mitchell | United States | 13 May 2017 | | Tempe, United States | |
| T52 | 4:10.77 | Tanja Henseler | Switzerland | 21 February 2023 | Sharjah International Open Meeting | Sharjah, United Arab Emirates | |
| T53/54 | 3:02.26 | Catherine Debrunner | Switzerland | 31 May 2025 | Weltklasse am See | Arbon, Switzerland | |
| T61 | vacant | | | | | | |
| T62 | vacant | | | | | | |
| T63 | vacant | | | | | | |
| T64 | 4:58.68 | Grace Norman | United States | 28 June 2015 | | Indianapolis, United States | |

==== 3000 m ====
| Class | Athlete | Nationality | Record | Competition | Location | Date | Ref. |
|---|---|---|---|---|---|---|---|
| T11 | Pavla Valnickova | Czechoslovakia | 11:07.65 | | Barcelona, Spain | 6 September 1992 | |
| T12 | Rimma Batalova | Russia | 10:04.33 | | Berlin, Germany | 31 July 1994 | |
| T13 | Pamela McGonigle | United States | 10:42.99 | | | 1 January 1991 | |
| T20 | Arleta Meloch | Poland | 09:54.26 | | Grudziądz, Poland | 17 June 2001 | |

==== 5000 m ====
| Class | Record | Athlete | Nationality | Date | Competition | Location | Ref. |
|---|---|---|---|---|---|---|---|
| T11 | 17:17.32 | Mary Waithera Njoroge | Kenya | 25 April 2019 | | Marrakesh, Morocco | |
| T12 | 17:50.45 | Elena Pautova | Russia | 4 August 2003 | | Quebec, Canada | |
| T13 | 15:07.19 | Marla Runyan | United States | 27 August 1999 | | Seville, Spain | |
| T20 | 17:17.30 | Hannah Taunton | Great Britain | 4 September 2020 | British Championships | Manchester, United Kingdom | |
| T34 | 13:25.50 | Record mark | | | | | |
| T35 | vacant | | | | | | |
| T36 | vacant | | | | | | |
| T37 | vacant | | | | | | |
| T38 | vacant | | | | | | |
| T45 | vacant | | | | | | |
| T46 | vacant | | | | | | |
| T51 | vacant | | | | | | |
| T52 | 14:47.55 | Marieke Vervoort | Belgium | 18 May 2014 | | Nottwil, Switzerland | |
| T53/54 | 10:24.36 | Catherine Debrunner | Switzerland | 1 June 2025 | Weltklasse am See | Arbon, Switzerland | |
| vacant | | | | | | | |
| T62 | vacant | | | | | | |
| T63 | vacant | | | | | | |
| T64 | 18:43.36 | Record mark | | | | | |

==== 10000 m ====
| Class | Record | Athlete | Nationality | Date | Competition | Location | Ref. |
|---|---|---|---|---|---|---|---|
| T11 | vacant | | | | | | |
| T12 | 46:00.59 | Record mark | | | | | |
| T13 | vacant | | | | | | |
| T20 | vacant | | | | | | |
| T20 | 36:46.34 | Arleta Meloch | Poland | 17 August 2002 | | Białogard, Poland | |
| T37 | vacant | | | | | | |
| T44 | vacant | | | | | | |
| T46 | vacant | | | | | | |
| T51 | vacant | | | | | | |
| T52 | vacant | | | | | | |
| T53/54 | 24:21.64 | Jean Driscoll | United States | 18 August 1996 | | Atlanta, United States | |
| T61 | vacant | | | | | | |
| T62 | vacant | | | | | | |
| T63 | vacant | | | | | | |
| T64 | vacant | | | | | | |

==== 100 m hurdles ====
| Class | Athlete | Nationality | Record | Competition | Location | Date |
|---|---|---|---|---|---|---|
| T20 | Maria Sousa | Portugal | 18.34 | | Rio Major, Portugal | 10 June 2000 |

==== 400 m hurdles ====
| Class | Athlete | Nationality | Record | Competition | Location | Date |
|---|---|---|---|---|---|---|
| T20 | Rabia Belhaj Ahmed | Tunisia | 1:07.99 | | Tunis, Tunisia | 7 July 2003 |

==== 4 × 100 m relay ====
| Class | Record | Athlete | Nationality | Date | Meet | Place | Ref. |
|---|---|---|---|---|---|---|---|
| T11-13 | 47.18 | Zhou Guohua (T11); Shen Yaqin (T12); Jia Juntingxian (T11); Liu Cuiqing (T11) | China | 14 September 2016 | Paralympic Games | Rio de Janeiro, Brazil | |
| T20 | 51.24 | | Poland | 7 July 2003 | | Tunis, Tunisia | |
| T33–34/T51–54 | vacant | | | | | | |
| T35–38 | 50.81 | Jiang Fenfen (T37); Chen Junfei (T38); Li Yingli (T37); Wen Xiaoyan (T37) | China | 15 September 2016 | Paralympic Games | Rio de Janeiro, Brazil | |
| T42–46 | 56.50 | | Germany | 15 August 1998 | | Birmingham, United Kingdom | |
| T42–47/T61–64 | 51.92 | Kiki Hendriks (T62); Fleur Jong (T62); Marlene van Gansewinkel (T64); Noëlle Roorda (T47) | Netherlands | 1 July 2022 | Para Leichtathletik-Heimspiel | Leverkusen, Germany | |
| T53–54 | 57.61 | Dong Hongjiao (T54); Liu Wenjun (T54); Huang Lisha (T53); Zhang Ting (T54) | China | 16 September 2008 | Paralympic Games | Beijing, China | |

==== 4 × 400 m relay ====
| Class | Record | Athlete | Nationality | Date | Meet | Place | Ref. |
|---|---|---|---|---|---|---|---|
| T11–13 | 4:02.21 | | Brazil | 6 August 2007 | | São Paulo, Brazil | |
| T20 | 4:06.61 | | Poland | 9 July 2003 | | Tunis, Tunisia | |
| T35–38 | vacant | | | | | | |
| T42–47/T61–64 | vacant | | | | | | |
| T53–54 | 3:32.11 | Li Yingjie (T54); Liu Wenjun (T54); Zhou Hongzhuan (T53); Zou Lihong (T54) | China | 15 September 2016 | Paralympic Games | Rio de Janeiro, Brazil | |

==== High jump ====
| Class | Record | Athlete | Nationality | Date | Competition | Location | Ref. |
|---|---|---|---|---|---|---|---|
| T11 | 1.45 m | Vera Kroes | Netherlands | 8 August 1986 | | Gothenburg, Sweden | |
| T11 | 1.45 m | Joke Rijswijk | Netherlands | 19 October 1988 | | Seoul, South Korea | |
| T12 | 1.57 m | Helena Kannus-Silm | Estonia | 7 August 2001 | | Białystok, Poland | |
| T13 | 1.80 m | Marla Runyan | United States | 1 January 1995 | | Colorado, United States | |
| T20 | 1.65 m | Bogumila Zedig | Poland | 8 July 2003 | | Tunis, Tunisia | |
| T42 | 1.38 m | Miho Fujii | Japan | 26 October 2013 | | Kuala Lumpur, Malaysia | |
| T44 | 1.28 m | Record mark | | | | | |
| T44 | 1.52 m | Michaela Daamen | Germany | 16 June 2001 | | Assen, Netherlands | |
| T45 | 1.45 m | Giselle Cole | Canada | 24 June 1984 | | New York City, United States | |
| T46/47 | 1.67 m | Catherine Bader-Bille | Germany | 17 June 2000 | | Weinstadt, Germany | |
| T61 | vacant | | | | | | |
| T62 | vacant | | | | | | |
| T63 | vacant | | | | | | |
| T64 | 1.52 m | Michaela Daamen | Germany | 16 June 2001 | | Assen, Netherlands | |

==== Long jump ====
| Class | Record | Athlete | Nationality | Date | Meet | Place | Ref. |
|---|---|---|---|---|---|---|---|
| T11 | 5.46 m (+0.1 m/s) | Silvânia Costa de Oliveira | Brazil | 17 July 2016 | | São Paulo, Brazil | |
| T12 | 6.60 m (−0.9 m/s) | Oksana Zubkovska | Ukraine | 7 September 2012 | Paralympic Games | London, United Kingdom | |
| T13 | 5.88 (±0.0 m/s) | Marla Runyan | United States | 1 January 1995 | | Colorado, United States | |
| T20 | 6.21 m (−0.9 m/s) | Karolina Kucharczyk | Poland | 14 November 2019 | World Para Championships | Dubai, United Arab Emirates | |
| T35 | 3.07 m (−2.1 m/s) | Ellen Westling | Sweden | 28 November 2022 | IWAS World Games | Vila Real de Santo António, Portugal | |
| T36 | 4.11 m (−0.3 m/s) | Claudia Nicoleitzik | Germany | 18 March 2016 | | Dubai, United Arab Emirates | |
| T37 | 5.45 m (−0.2 m/s) | Wen Xiaoyan | China | 24 October 2023 | Asian Para Games | Hangzhou, China | |
| T38 | 5.82 m (−0.5 m/s) | Luca Ekler | Hungary | 10 June 2022 | Handisport Open Paris | Paris, France | |
| T42 | 4.13 m (+1.7 m/s) | Ana Cláudia Silva | Brazil | 26 March 2023 | Loterias Caixa Circuit | São Paulo, Brazil | |
| T42 | 4.93 m (−0.4 m/s) | Vanessa Low | Germany | 10 September 2016 | Paralympic Games | Rio de Janeiro, Brazil | |
| T43 | vacant | | | | | | |
| T43 | 3.36 m | Aimee Mullins | United States | 19 April 1997 | | San Diego, United States | |
| T44 | 4.98 m (+1.9 m/s) | Annie Carey | United States | 19 July 2024 | U.S. Paralympic Trials | Miramar, United States | |
| T44 | 5.83 m (−0.5 m/s) | Marie-Amélie Le Fur | France | 9 September 2016 | Paralympic Games | Rio de Janeiro, Brazil | |
| T45 | 4.29 m (+1.7 m/s) | Nelya Schasfoort | United States | 3 August 2019 | | Nottwil, Switzerland | |
| T46/47 | 6.23 m (+1.3 m/s) | Kiara Rodríguez | Ecuador | 16 July 2023 | World Para Championships | Paris, France | |
| T61 | 5.45 m (−0.3 m/s) | Vanessa Low | Australia | 5 September 2024 | Paralympic Games | Paris, France | |
| T62 | 6.74 m (+0.2 m/s) | Fleur Jong | Netherlands | 8 September 2023 | Memorial Van Damme | Brussels, Belgium | |
| T63 | 5.46 m (+0.9 m/s) | Martina Caironi | Italy | 10 June 2022 | Handisport Open Paris | Paris, France | |
| T64 | 6.14 m (+0.1 m/s) | Marie-Amélie Le Fur | France | 11 February 2021 | World Para Athletics Grand Prix | Dubai, United Arab Emirates | |

==== Triple jump ====
| Class | Record | Athlete | Nationality | Date | Competition | Location | Ref. |
|---|---|---|---|---|---|---|---|
| T11 | vacant | | | | | | |
| T12 | 12.11 m (±0.0 m/s) | Marija Iveković-Meštrović | Croatia | 6 August 2007 | | São Paulo, Brazil | |
| T13 | vacant | | | | | | |
| T20 | 11.93 (±0.0 m/s) | Aleksandra Ruchkina | Russia | 14 October 2019 | INAS Global Games | Brisbane, Australia | |
| T45 | vacant | | | | | | |
| T46/T47 | 10.35 (+0.6 m/s) | Styliani Smaragdi | Greece | 10 July 2022 | Greek Championships | Thessaloniki, Greece | |

==== Club throw ====
| Class | Record | Athlete | Nationality | Date | Meet | Place | Ref. |
|---|---|---|---|---|---|---|---|
| F31 | 10.98 m | Sunjeong Kim | South Korea | 1 September 2012 | Paralympic Games | London, United Kingdom | |
| F32 | 26.93 m | Maroua Ibrahmi | Tunisia | 9 September 2016 | Paralympic Games | Rio de Janeiro, Brazil | |
| F51 | 23.82 m | Rachael Morrison | United States | 8 April 2017 | | Claremont, United States | |

==== Shot put ====
| Class | Record | Athlete | Nationality | Date | Meet | Place | Ref. |
|---|---|---|---|---|---|---|---|
| F11 | 17.32 m | Assunta Legnante | Italy | 6 July 2014 | | Padova, Italy | |
| F12 | 15.05 m | Safiya Burkhanova | Uzbekistan | 14 September 2016 | Paralympic Games | Rio de Janeiro, Brazil | |
| F13 | 13.05 m | Tamara Sivakova | Belarus | 25 July 1998 | | Madrid, Spain | |
| F20 | 15.12 m | Sabrina Fortune | Great Britain | 1 September 2024 | Paralympic Games | Paris, France | |
| F32 | 8.00 m | Anastasiia Moskalenko | Ukraine | 4 September 2024 | Paralympic Games | Saint-Denis, France | |
| F33 | 8.23 m | Gilda Guadalupe Cota Vera | Mexico | 6 April 2024 | World Para Athletics Grand Prix | Xalapa, Mexico | |
| F34 | 9.25 m | Zou Lijuan | China | 12 July 2023 | World Para Championships | Paris, France | |
| F34 | 10.25 m | Birgit Kober | Germany | 6 September 2012 | Paralympic Games | London, United Kingdom | |
| F35 | 13.91 m | Wang Jun | China | 15 September 2016 | Paralympic Games | Rio de Janeiro, Brazil | |
| F36 | 11.79 m | Birgit Kober | Germany | 24 August 2018 | | Berlin, Germany | |
| F37 | 15.50 m | Lisa Adams | New Zealand | 13 September 2020 | Spring Series | Hastings, New Zealand | |
| F38 | 12.58 m | Aldona Grigaliuniene | Lithuania | 11 September 2008 | Paralympic Games | Beijing, China | |
| F40 | 9.25 m | Lara Baars | Netherlands | 9 May 2024 | Jump & Fly | Hechingen, Germany | |
| F40 | 8.95 m | Raoua Tlili | Tunisia | 15 September 2008 | Paralympic Games | Beijing, China | |
| F41 | 10.55 m | Raoua Tlili | Tunisia | 27 August 2021 | Paralympic Games | Tokyo, Japan | |
| F42 | 11.64 m | Goodness Nwachukwu | Nigeria | 15 July 2023 | World Para Championships | Paris, France | |
| F42 | 10.06 m | Zheng Baozhu | China | 9 September 2008 | Paralympic Games | Beijing, China | |
| F43 | 8.74 m | Tayla Clement | New Zealand | 21 March 2019 | Sir Graeme Douglas International Track Challenge | Auckland, New Zealand | |
| F43 | 9.76 m | Stela Eneva | Bulgaria | 17 July 2004 | | Olomouc, Czech Republic | |
| F44 | 13.14 m | Yao Juan | China | 28 October 2015 | IPC World Championships | Doha, Qatar | |
| F45 | 8.74 m | Record mark | | | | | |
| F46 | 14.06 m | Noelle Malkamaki | United States | 4 September 2024 | Paralympic Games | Saint-Denis, France | |
| F52 | 7.80 m | Elizabeth Rodrigues Gomes | Brazil | 27 September 2019 | | São Paulo, Brazil | |
| F53 | 5.88 m | Cristeen Smith | New Zealand | 28 July 1994 | | Berlin, Germany | |
| F54 | 8.19 m | Francisca Mardones Sepulveda | Chile | 12 November 2019 | World Para Championships | Dubai, United Arab Emirates | |
| F55 | 9.06 m | Marianne Buggenhagen | Germany | 19 September 2004 | Paralympic Games | Athens, Greece | |
| F56 | 9.95 m | Nadia Medjmedj | Algeria | 14 February 2019 | | Sharjah, United Arab Emirates | |
| F57 | 11.56 m | Safia Djelal | Algeria | 21 March 2022 | | Dubai, United Arab Emirates | |
| F58 | 10.96 m | Eucharia Njideka Iyiazi | Nigeria | 9 September 2008 | Paralympic Games | Beijing, China | |
| F61 | vacant | | | | | | |
| F62 | vacant | | | | | | |

==== Discus throw ====
| Class | Record | Athlete | Nationality | Date | Meet | Place | Ref. |
|---|---|---|---|---|---|---|---|
| F11 | 40.42 m | Liangmin Zhang | China | 22 January 2011 | | Christchurch, New Zealand | |
| F12 | 47.40 m | Sofia Oksem | Russia | 15 June 2016 | IPC European Championships | Grosseto, Italy | |
| F13 | 44.67 m | Liiudya Maso Belicer | Cuba | 23 October 2000 | Paralympic Games | Sydney, Australia | |
| F20 | 37.58 m | Ewa Durska | Poland | 7 July 2003 | | Tunis, Tunisia | |
| F32 | 11.37 m | Mounia Gasmi | Algeria | 23 March 2017 | | Dubai, United Arab Emirates | |
| F32 | 12.11 m | Gemma Prescott | Great Britain | 11 July 2009 | | Sindelfingen, Germany | |
| F33 | 12.76 m | Joanna Hańtzschel | Poland | 9 June 2018 | | Bydgoszcz, Poland | |
| F33 | 17.05 m | Tetyana Yakybchuk | Ukraine | 10 September 2008 | Paralympic Games | Beijing, China | |
| F34 | 25.22 m | Birgit Kober | Germany | 23 July 2011 | | Singen am Hohentwiel, Germany | |
| F35 | 31.92 m | Jun Wang | China | 14 May 2017 | | Beijing, China | |
| F36 | 28.01 m | Wu Qing | China | 31 August 2012 | Paralympic Games | London, United Kingdom | |
| F37 | 37.60 m | Mi Na | China | 17 September 2016 | Paralympic Games | Rio de Janeiro, Brazil | |
| F38 | 32.95 m | Noelle Lenihan | Ireland | 22 August 2018 | Para European Championships | Berlin, Germany | |
| F40 | 23.34 m | Renata Sliwinska | Poland | 15 September 2016 | Paralympic Games | Rio de Janeiro, Brazil | |
| F41 | 33.38 m | Raoua Tlili | Tunisia | 15 September 2016 | Paralympic Games | Rio de Janeiro, Brazil | |
| F42 | 36.56 m | Goodness Nwachukwu | Nigeria | 4 August 2022 | | Birmingham, United Kingdom | |
| F42 | 39.66 m | Goodness Nwachukwu | Nigeria | 29 July 2026 | Commonwealth Games | Glasgow, United Kingdom | |
| F43 | 26.91 m | Vajiheh Houshmand | Iran | 27 February 2023 | Dubai Grand Prix | Dubai, United Arab Emirates | |
| F43 | 32.22 m | Stela Eneva | Bulgaria | 25 September 2004 | Paralympic Games | Athens, Greece | |
| F44 | 44.73 m | Yao Juan | China | 29 August 2021 | Paralympic Games | Tokyo, Japan | |
| F45 | 20.09 m | Irina Tychshenko | Kazakhstan | 13 March 2018 | | Dubai, United Arab Emirates | |
| F46 | 42.12 m | Wu Hong Ping | China | 25 September 2004 | Paralympic Games | Athens, Greece | |
| F51 | 13.23 m | Cassie Mitchell | United States | 15 July 2017 | World Para Athletics Championships | London, United Kingdom | |
| F52 | 15.28 m | Martina Kniezkova | Czech Republic | 20 September 2004 | Paralympic Games | Athens, Greece | |
| F53 | 14.46 m | Cristeen Smith | New Zealand | 26 July 1995 | | Stoke Mandeville, United Kingdom | |
| T54 | 19.96 m | Jana Fesslova | Czech Republic | 29 August 2004 | | Frýdek-Místek, Czech Republic | |
| F55 | 27.80 m | Marianne Buggenhagen | Germany | 9 September 2008 | Paralympic Games | Beijing, China | |
| F56 | 26.28 m | Nadia Medjmedj | Algeria | 15 March 2018 | | Dubai, United Arab Emirates | |
| F57 | 34.68 m | Nassima Saifi | Algeria | 25 February 2015 | | Dubai, United Arab Emirates | |
| F58 | 42.05 m | Nassima Saifi | Algeria | 27 July 2013 | IPC World Championships | Lyon, France | |
| F61 | vacant | | | | | | |
| F62 | vacant | | | | | | |
| F63 | 33.19 m | Zheng Baozhu | China | 15 September 2008 | Paralympic Games | Beijing, China | |
| F64 | 37.28 m | Jessica Heims | United States | 29 April 2022 | | Des Moines, China | |

==== Javelin throw ====
| Class | Record | Athlete | Nationality | Date | Meet | Place | Ref. |
|---|---|---|---|---|---|---|---|
| T11 | 38.62 m | Martina Willing | Germany | 6 September 1992 | | Barcelona, Spain | |
| F12 | 44.18 m | Irada Aliyeva | Azerbaijan | 27 October 2015 | IPC World Championships | Doha, Qatar | |
| F13 | 44.58 m | Nozimakhon Kayumova | Uzbekistan | 17 September 2016 | Paralympic Games | Rio de Janeiro, Brazil | |
| F20 | 39.77 m | Sirly Tiik | Estonia | 24 October 2000 | Paralympic Games | Sydney, Australia | |
| F33 | 13.02 m | Asmahane Boudjadar | Algeria | 19 March 2018 | | Sharjah, United Arab Emirates | |
| F33 | 14.14 m | Tina Ala-Aho | Finland | 19 June 2003 | | Assen, Netherlands | |
| F34 | 21.86 m | Lijuan Zou | China | 9 September 2016 | | Rio de Janeiro, Brazil | |
| F34 | 27.45 m | Birgit Kober | Germany | 23 July 2013 | IPC World Championships | Lyon, France | |
| F35 | 28.44 m | Jun Wang | China | 13 May 2017 | | Beijing, China | |
| F36 | 29.55 m | Wu Qing | China | 2 December 2011 | | Sharjah, United Arab Emirates | |
| F37 | 37.86 m | Shirlene Coelho | Brazil | 8 September 2012 | Paralympic Games | London, United Kingdom | |
| F38 | 32.87 m | Ramune Adomaitiene | Lithuania | 13 June 2010 | | Bottrop, Germany | |
| F40 | 22.20 | Renata Sliwinska | Poland | 24 June 2017 | | Białystok, Poland | |
| F40 | 28.30 m | Raoua Tlili | Tunisia | 16 June 2010 | | Rabat, Morocco | |
| F42 | 31.51 m | Claudia Biene | Germany | 16 September 2008 | | Taipei, Taiwan | |
| F43 | 27.97 m | Madeleine Deouwi | France | 1 January 1999 | | Bangkok, Thailand | |
| F44 | 40.51 m | Yao Juan | China | 8 September 2008 | Paralympic Games | Beijing, China | |
| F46 | 44.43 m | Hollie Arnold | Great Britain | 9 April 2018 | Commonwealth Games | Gold Coast, Australia | |
| F52 | 13.46 m | Antonia Balek | Croatia | 3 June 2009 | | Wedau Duisburg, Germany | |
| F53 | 11.87 m | Esther Rivera Robles | Mexico | 13 August 2007 | | Rio de Janeiro, Brazil | |
| F54 | 20.25 m | Flora Ugwunwa | Nigeria | 13 September 2016 | Paralympic Games | Rio de Janeiro, Brazil | |
| F55 | 27.07 m | Diana Dadzite | Latvia | 17 July 2017 | World Para Championships | London, United Kingdom | |
| F56 | 24.03 m | Martina Willing | Germany | 13 June 2008 | | Berlin, Germany | |
| F57 | 25.95 | Safia Djelal | Algeria | 21 March 2017 | | Dubai, United Arab Emirates | |
| F58 | 31.12 m | Safia Djelal | Algeria | 28 April 2007 | | Marrakesh, Morocco | |

==== Pentathlon ====
| Class | Record | Athlete | Nationality | Date | Competition | Location | Ref. |
|---|---|---|---|---|---|---|---|
| P11 | 2182 | Martina Willing | Germany | 11 September 1992 | | Barcelona, Spain | |
| P12 | 2877 | Marija Iveković Mestrovic | Croatia | 23 August 2005 | | Espoo, Finland | |
| P13 | 3661 | Marla Runyan | United States | 22 August 1996 | | Atlanta, United States | |
| P20 | 2902 | Sirly Tiik | Estonia | 5 July 2003 | | Tunis, Tunisia | |
| P44 | 4653 | Andrea Scherney | Austria | 20 June 2003 | | Assen, Netherlands | |
| P46 | 3928 | Marijke Mettes | Netherlands | 14 May 2005 | | Emmeloord, Netherlands | |
| P52/53 | 5167 | Cristeen Smith | New Zealand | 5 August 1993 | | Stoke Mandeville, United Kingdom | |
| P54-58 | 5707 | Marianne Buggenhagen | Germany | 27 July 1994 | | Berlin, Germany | |

== Road ==
=== Men ===
==== Half marathon ====
| Class | Record | Athlete | Nationality | Date | Meet | Location | Ref. |
|---|---|---|---|---|---|---|---|
| T51 | 1:08:21.0 | Helder Mestre | Portugal | 19 March 2017 | | Lisbon, Portugal | |
| T53/54 | 42:23.0 | David Weir | Great Britain | 20 March 2016 | | Lisbon, Portugal | |

==== Marathon ====
| Class | Record | Athlete | Nationality | Date | Competition | Location | Ref. |
|---|---|---|---|---|---|---|---|
| T11 | 2:23:27 | Shinya Wada | Japan | 4 February 2024 | Beppu-Ōita Marathon | Ōita, Japan | |
| T12 | 2:21:33 | El Amin Chentouf | Morocco | 26 April 2015 | IPC World Championships | London, United Kingdom | |
| T13 | 2:22:55 | Carlos Talbot | United States | 24 October 1988 | | Seoul, South Korea | |
| T42 | 3:15:53 | Richard Whitehead | Great Britain | 21 April 2013 | | London, United Kingdom | |
| T44 | 3:10:09 | Nicolò Guido Pierni | Italy | 5 March 2023 | | Bologna, Italy | |
| T46 | 2:26:54 | Abderrahman Ait Khamouch | Spain | 26 April 2015 | IPC World Championships | London, United Kingdom | |
| T51 | 2:23:08 | Heinrich Koberle | Germany | 24 September 1995 | | Berlin, Germany | |
| T52 | 1:40:07 | Thomas Geierspichler | Austria | 17 September 2008 | Paralympic Games | Beijing, China | |
| T53/54 | 1:17:47 | Marcel Hug | Switzerland | 21 November 2021 | | Ōita, Japan | |
| T61 | vacant | | | | | | |
| T62 | vacant | | | | | | |
| T63 | vacant | | | | | | |
| T64 | 2:56:53 | Eitan Hermon | Israel | 23 April 2017 | | Vienna, Austria | |

=== Women ===
==== Half marathon ====
| Class | Record | Athlete | Nationality | Date | Competition | Location | Ref. |
|---|---|---|---|---|---|---|---|
| T53/54 | 45:49.0 | Catherine Debrunner | Switzerland | 17 November 2024 | | Ōita, Japan | |

==== Marathon ====
| Class | Record | Athlete | Nationality | Date | Meet | Place | Ref. |
|---|---|---|---|---|---|---|---|
| T11 | 3:11:13 | Louzanne Coetzee | South Africa | 5 September 2021 | Paralympic Games | Tokyo, Japan | |
| T12 | 2:54:13 | Misato Michishita | Japan | 20 December 2020 | | Hōfu, Japan | |
| T13 | vacant | | | | | | |
| T42 | vacant | | | | | | |
| T43 | vacant | | | | | | |
| T44 | vacant | | | | | | |
| T45 | vacant | | | | | | |
| T46 | vacant | | | | | | |
| T51 | vacant | | | | | | |
| T52 | 2:07:28 | Yamaki Tomomi | Japan | 9 November 2008 | | Ōita, Japan | |
| T53/54 | 1:34:16 | Catherine Debrunner | Switzerland | 24 September 2023 | Berlin Marathon | Berlin, Germany | |
| T61 | vacant | | | | | | |
| T62 | vacant | | | | | | |
| T63 | vacant | | | | | | |
| T64 | vacant | | | | | | |

== See also ==
- List of IPC world records in swimming
