= 2011 IPC Athletics World Championships – Men's 4 × 400 metres relay =

The men's 4 x 400 metres relay at the 2011 IPC Athletics World Championships was held at the QEII Stadium on 29 January 2011.

== Medalists ==
Class	Gold	Silver	Bronze
T53/54	China; Cui Yanfeng; Liu Yang; Li Huzhao; Liu Chengming	South Korea; Hong Suk-Man; Yoo Byung-Hoon; Jung Dong-Ho; Lee Kihak	Canada; Colin Mathieson; Eric Gauthier; Jean-Paul Compaore; Alexandre Dupont

== T53/54 ==
T53 = normal upper limb function, no abdominal, leg or lower spinal function.

T54 = normal upper limb function, partial to normal trunk function, may have significant function of the lower limbs.

=== Results ===
==== Heats ====
Rank	Heat	Nation	Athletes	Time	Notes
1	2	China	Cui Yanfeng, Liu Yang, Li Huzhao, Liu Chengming	3:13.86	q, CR
2	1	South Korea	Hong Suk-Man, Yoo Byung-Hoon, Jung Dong-Ho, Lee Kihak	3:21.05	q, CR
3	2	Canada	Colin Mathieson, Eric Gauthier, Jean-Paul Compaore, Alexandre Dupont	3:22.11	q, AR
4	1	United States	Jordan Bird, Brian Siemann, Ryan Chalmers, Aaron Pike	3:25.04	q
	2	Thailand	Saichon Konjen, Prawat Wahoram, Sopa Intasen, Supachai Koysub	DQ	R 170.14
	1	Australia	Jake Christopher Lappin, Richard Nicholson, Matthew Cameron, Richard Colman	DQ	R 163.3
	1	France	Julien Casoli, Pierre Fairbank, Alain Fuss, Denis Lemeunier	DQ	R 170.14
	2	Mexico	Jaime Ramirez Valencia, Freddy Sandoval, Juan Pablo Cervantes Garcia, Pedro Gandarilla Fernandez	DQ	R 163.3

Key: CR = Championship Record, AR = Continental Record, R 163.3 = Leaving the lane, R 170.14 = Passing of the baton outside the take-over zone

==== Final ====
Rank	Nation	Athletes	Time	Notes
1st place, gold medalist(s)	China	Cui Yanfeng, Liu Yang, Li Huzhao, Liu Chengming	3:18.95	
2nd place, silver medalist(s)	South Korea	Hong Suk-Man, Yoo Byung-Hoon, Jung Dong-Ho, Lee Kihak	3:25.99	
3rd place, bronze medalist(s)	Canada	Colin Mathieson, Eric Gauthier, Jean-Paul Compaore, Alexandre Dupont	3:29.94	
4	United States	Jordan Bird, Brian Siemann, Ryan Chalmers, Aaron Pike	3:33.68	
