= Chronological summary of the 2008 Summer Paralympics =

This article contains notable highlights from the 2008 Summer Paralympics in Beijing, China.

== Calendar ==
●	Opening ceremony	●	Event competitions	●	Gold medal events	●	Closing ceremony

September		6th Sat	7th Sun	8th Mon	9th Tue	10th Wed	11th Thu	12th Fri	13th Sat	14th Sun	15th Mon	16th Tue	17th Wed	Events
Ceremonies		OC											CC	—N/a
Archery					●	●	●	●	4	3	2			9
Athletics				10	20	17	10	16	20	18	19	25	5	160
Boccia			●	●	4	●	●	3						7
Cycling	Road cycling							15	4	4				46
Cycling	Track cycling		5	7	7	4								46
Equestrian			●	2	4	2	3							11
Football	5-a-side		●		●		●		●		●		1	1
Football	7-a-side			●		●		●		●		1		1
Goalball			●	●	●	●	●	●	●	2				2
Judo			4	4	5									13
Powerlifting					3	4	2		3	4	2	2		20
Rowing					●	●	4							4
Sailing				●	●	●	●	●	3					3
Shooting			2	2	2	2	2	2						12
Swimming			16	18	16	12	13	16	14	18	17			140
Table tennis			●	●	●	5	11	●	●	●	4	4		24
Volleyball			●	●	●	●	●	●	●	1	1			2
Wheelchair basketball			●	●	●	●	●	●	●	●	1	1		2
Wheelchair fencing										3	3	2	2	10
Wheelchair rugby								●	●	●	●	1		1
Wheelchair tennis				●	●	●	●	●	1	3	2			6
Daily medal events			27	41	61	46	45	52	49	56	51	36	8	472
Cumulative total			27	68	129	175	220	272	321	377	428	464	472	472
September		6th Sat	7th Sun	8th Mon	9th Tue	10th Wed	11th Thu	12th Fri	13th Sat	14th Sun	15th Mon	16th Tue	17th Wed	Events

== September 6 ==
Opening Ceremony

== Day 1: September 7 ==
- The first gold medal of the Beijing Paralympics went to Slovakia's Veronika Vadovicova in shooting, in the 10 metre air rifle competition.
- In swimming, Natalie du Toit of South Africa won gold in the 100 metre butterfly event. The United States won four of the sixteen gold medals available in swimming on day one, more than any other country.
- After a strong performance at the Olympics, Great Britain won gold in all three of the first day events it had entered in cycling, with Simon Richardson, Darren Kenny, and the duo of Aileen McGlynn and Ellen Hunter.
- Of the four gold medals available for the first day in judo, the two women's went to China (Guo Hua Ping and Cui Na) and the two men's to Algeria (Mouloud Noura and Sidali Lamri), with all four wins being reported as unexpected.

Gold Medalists
Sport	Event	Competitor(s)	NOC	Rec	Ref
Cycling	Men's 1 km Time Trial (LC 3-4)	Simon Richardson	Great Britain	WR	
Cycling	Women's 1 km Time Trial (B&VI 1-3)	Aileen McGlynn; Ellen Hunter	Great Britain	WR	
Cycling	Men's Individual Pursuit (CP 3)	Darren Kenny	Great Britain		
Cycling	Men's Individual Pursuit (CP 4)	Christopher Scott	Australia		
Cycling	Men's Ind. Pursuit (B&VI 1-3)	Kieran Modra; Tyson Lawrence	Australia	WR	
Judo	Women -48 kg	Guo Hua Ping	China		
Judo	Women -52 kg	Cui Na	China		
Judo	Men -60 kg	Mouloud Noura	Algeria		
Judo	Men -66 kg	Sidali Lamri	Algeria		
Shooting	Women's R2-10m Air Rifle Stand-SH1	Veronika Vadovicova	Slovakia		
Shooting	Men's P1-10m Air Pistol-SH1	Valeriy Ponomarenko	Russia	WR / PB	
Swimming	Men's 200m Freestyle - S2	Dmitrii Kokarev	Russia	WR	
Swimming	Men's 100m Butterfly - S13	Dzmitry Salei	Belarus	WR	
Swimming	Women's 100m Butterfly - S13	Valerie Grand Maison	Canada		
Swimming	Men's 100m Freestyle - S3	Du Jianping	China	WR	
Swimming	Men's 100m Freestyle - S4	David Smetanine	France		
Swimming	Women's 100m Freestyle - S4	Nely Miranda	Mexico		
Swimming	Men's 100m Freestyle - S5	Daniel Dias	Brazil	WR	
Swimming	Women's 100m Freestyle - S5	Maria Teresa Perales	Spain	WR	
Swimming	Men's 200m IM - SM6	Sascha Kindred	Great Britain	WR	
Swimming	Women's 200m IM - SM6	Miranda Uhl	United States	WR	
Swimming	Men's 200m IM - SM7	Rudy Garcia Tolson	United States	WR	
Swimming	Women's 200m IM - SM7	Erin Popovich	United States	WR	
Swimming	Men's 100m Butterfly - S8	Peter Luck	Australia	WR	
Swimming	Women's 100m Butterfly - S8	Jessica Long	United States		
Swimming	Men's 100m Butterfly - S9	Tamás Sors	Hungary	WR	
Swimming	Women's 100m Butterfly - S9	Natalie du Toit	South Africa	WR	

== Day 2: September 8 ==
- The women's T54 5000 metre race in athletics was marred by a spectacular crash just before the final lap, when six athletes collided in a pile-up, several of them damaging their wheelchairs in the process and thus being left unable to complete the race. The crash was reported to have been caused by Swiss athlete Edith Hunkeler colliding with fellow Swiss athlete Sandra Graf, whereupon athletes behind them piled up over them. Hunkeler suffered a broken collarbone in the accident. Reaching the 50 metre mark, remaining competitors were then impeded by officials running across the track to assist fallen athletes. The race was won by Canada's Diane Roy, and the medal ceremony was completed, before IPC officials announced that they had ruled in favour of an appeal lodged by three countries, and cancelled the results. Medallists were asked to relinquish their medals, and the race was rescheduled for September 12 (with Hunkeler being disqualified), amidst significant controversy.
- 13-year-old Eleanor Simmonds of Great Britain became the youngest ever individual Paralympic gold medallist when she won the 100m freestyle S6 event in swimming.
- Osamah Alshanqiti won Saudi Arabia's first ever Paralympic or Olympic gold medal, in the F12 triple jump, with a world record jump of 15.37 metres.
- The People's Republic of China relay team of Zong Kai, Zhao Ji, Zhang Lixin & Li Huzhao sets a new world record of 49.89 seconds in round 1, heat 1 of the men's 4 × 100 m, T53-54.

== Day 3: September 9 ==
- Great Britain won five more gold medals in cycling, bringing its total to nine golds and one silver in cycling. Of Britain's six cycling competitors on day 3, five took gold and the sixth, Rik Waddon, took silver behind fellow British athlete Darren Kenny in the 1 km CP3 time trial.
- Haider Ali won Pakistan's first ever Paralympic medal, a silver in the F37/38 long jump, with a world record jump. Farhat Chida of Tunisia broke Ali's new world record to take gold.
- Laurentia Tan won Singapore's first ever Paralympic medal, a bronze in equestrian in the individual championship test Grade Ia.
- Oscar Pistorius of South Africa won the first of his three targeted gold medals, in the T44 100 metre sprint in athletics.
- Chantal Petitclerc of Canada sets a Paralympic record of 16.07 seconds in round 1, heat 1 of the women's 100m, T54.
- Men's 4 × 100 m relay, T53-54 – China (Zong Kai, Zhao Ji, Zhang Lixin & Li Huzhao) won in 49.90, ahead of Thailand (Supachoi Koysub, Konjen, Prawat Wahoram & Pichet Krungget), 51.93 and Republic of Korea (Hong Suk-Man, Jung Dong-Ho, Kim Gyu-Dae & Yoo Byung-Hoon), 53.52.
- Pakistani powerlifter Ahmed Butt was the first athlete to be expelled from the Beijing Paralympics after testing positive for steroid use.

== Day 4: September 10 ==
- Women's 100m, T54 – Chantal Petitclerc of Canada won in 16.15 seconds, ahead of Liu Wenjun, China, 16.20 and Dong Hongjiao, China, 16.24.
- Men's 400m, T54—Zhang Lixin, China won in 45.07 seconds, a new world record, ahead of David Weir, Britain, 46.02 and Saichon Konjen, Thailand, 46.86.

== Day 5: September 11 ==
- Women's 200m Individual Medley, SM9 - Natalie Du Toit from Republic of South Africa won with a world record of 2 minutes and 27.83 seconds, ahead of Stephanie Dixon, Canada, 2:37.54, and Louise Watkin, Great Britain, 2:40.31.

== Day 6: September 12 ==
- Women's 400m, T54 – Chantal Petitclerc of Canada won in 52.02 seconds, ahead of Tatyana McFadden, United States, 53.49 and Diane Roy, Canada, 54.72.
- Zhang Lixin of China sets a world record of 24.18 seconds in round 1, heat 2 of the men's 200m, T54.
- Men's 400m, T52 - Tomoya Ito of Japan won in 57.25 seconds (Paralympic Record) ahead of Toshihiro Takada, Japan, 60.32 and Dean Bergeron, Canada, 60.43 seconds.

== Day 7: September 13 ==
Archery

- Lindsey Carmichael of Lago Vista, Texas, Standing Recurve Female Archer for USA, won the first medal in archery by an American woman ever at a Paralympics, shooting the highest score of the recurve medal matches (105 out of a possible 120) and the first medal in archery for the US during both the Beijing Olympics & Paralympics.

Swimming

- New Zealand's Sophie Pascoe and Shireen Sapiro of South Africa finish in a dead heat in the women's S10 100m backstroke and each receive the gold medal.

Wheelchair Basketball

- Ahead of their scheduled quarter final game against the USA, the Iranian team withdrew from the men's wheelchair basketball tournament. In response, the Iranian Wheelchair Basketball Federation was suspended until 2013.

== Day 8: September 14 ==
- Women's 200m, T54 – Chantal Petitclerc, Canada, won in 27.52 seconds (setting a world record), ahead of Tatyana McFadden, United States, 28.43 and Manuela Schar, Switzerland, 28.84.
- Women's 800m, T54 – Petitclerc won in 1:45.19 (a new world record), ahead of McFadden, USA, 1:46.95 and Diane Roy, Canada, 1:48.07.
- Men's 200m, T54 -- Zhang Lixin, China, won in 24.34, ahead of Saichon Konjen, Thailand, 25.15 and Leo-Pekka Tahti, Finland, 25.17
- Men's 4 × 400 m relay, T53-54 – China (Cui Yangfeng, Zhao Ji, Li Huzhao & Zhang Lixin) won in 3:05.67 (a new world record), ahead of Thailand (Koysub, Wahoram, Krungget & Saichon Konjen), 3:11.63 and France (Julien Casoli, Pierre Fairbank, Alain Fuss & Denis Lemeunier), 3 :17.93. It is Zhang Lixin's fourth gold medal of the Games, and all with new world record times during the competition.
- As the cycling competitions come to a close, Great Britain has by far dominated the events, winning seventeen gold medals.

== Day 9: September 15 ==
Athletics

- Francis Kompaon wins Papua New Guinea's first ever Paralympic or Olympic medal - a silver in the Men's 100m (T46), in athletics. Kompaon finishes second to Australia's Heath Francis by 0.05 seconds.
- So Wa Wai of Hong Kong wins gold in the men's T36 200m with a new world record time of 24.65.

Sitting Volleyball

- Iran win over Bosnia and Herzegovina in the men's volleyball final.

Wheelchair Tennis

- Shingo Kunieda wins Japan's first paralympic gold medal in wheelchair tennis after winning over Robin Ammerlaan of the Netherlands in the men's final.

== Day 10: September 16 ==
Athletics

- Women's 1500m, T54 – Chantal Petitclerc of Canada wins her fifth gold medal of the Games in 3:39.88, ahead of Shelly Woods, Britain, 3:40.99 and Edith Hunkeler, Switzerland, 3:41.03.
- Oscar Pistorius of South Africa wins the third of his three targeted gold medals, in the Men's 400m - T44 category, in athletics.
- Men's 800m, T52 - Tomoya Ito of Japan won his second gold medal of the Games in 1:53.42, ahead of Toshihiro Takada, Japan, 1:53.67 and Thomas Geierspichler, Austria, 1:56.26. Tomoya Ito marked world record at round 1
- Oxana Boturchuk wins gold in the women's T12 100m.
- Wang Fang of China sets a new world record of 13.83 in the final of the women's 100m T36.

Football 7-a-Side

- Ukraine win the gold medal after winning over Russia in added time in the final. Iran claim bronze after beating Brazil in the match for third place.

Wheelchair Basketball

- Australia defeat Canada 72-60 in the men's wheelchair basketball final to win the gold medal.

Wheelchair Rugby

- After Canada claimed bronze with a final win over Great Britain, the USA beat Australia in the final.

== Day 11: September 17 ==
Athletics

- Edith Hunkeler wins gold in the women's Marathon T54, beating Amanda McGrory of the USA by one second, while Swiss compatriot Sandra Graf completes the podium with the bronze.

Football 5-a-Side

- Brazil wins the gold medal after winning over the host nation China in the final. Argentina claimed bronze after winning a penalty shootout with Spain in the classification match.

Wheelchair Fencing

- Laurent Francois of France wins the last medal of the Beijing 2008 Paralympic Games, beating Hui Charn Hung of Hong Kong in the final of the men's sabre B.

Closing Ceremony

- The Beijing 2008 Paralympic Games came to close on 17 September. Taking the theme ‘A Letter to the Future’ the Ceremony featured about 2,000 performers. London, the host of the 2012 Paralympic Games, staged an eight-minute performance and aimed to show how sport can promote the Paralympic Movement and positively influence young people's lives.

== See also ==
- 2008 Summer Paralympics medal table
- Chronological summary of the 2008 Summer Olympics
