= 2013 IPC Athletics World Championships – Men's 4 × 400 metres relay =

The men's 4 × 400 metres relay at the 2013 IPC Athletics World Championships was held at the Stade du Rhône from 20 to 29 July.

== Medalists ==
Class	Gold	Silver	Bronze
T53/54	Brent Lakatos; Curtis Thom; Jean-Paul Compaore; Alexandre Dupont; Canada	Sukhum Namlun; Rawat Tana; Pichet Krungget; Saichon Konjen; Thailand	Hong Suk-Man; Yoo Byung-hoon; Jung Dong-Ho; Kim Gyu-Dae; South Korea

== See also ==
- List of IPC world records in athletics
