= Athletics at the 2008 Summer Paralympics – Men's 4 × 400 metre relay T53–T54 =

Men's 4x400m T53-54 at the XIII Paralympic Games
- Venue: Beijing National Stadium
- Dates: 14 September
- Competitors: 7
- Winning time: 3:05.67

Medalists
| 1st place, gold medalist(s) | | China (CHN); Cui Yanfeng, Zhao Ji, Li Huzhao, Zhang Lixin |
| 2nd place, silver medalist(s) | | Thailand (THA); Supachai Koysub, Prawat Wahoram, Pichet Krungget, Saichon Konjen |
| 3rd place, bronze medalist(s) | | France (FRA); Julien Casoli, Pierre Fairbank, Alain Fuss, Denis Lemeunier |

The men's 4x400m T53-54 event at the 2008 Summer Paralympics took place at the Beijing National Stadium on 14 September. There were two heats; the teams with the four fastest times (Q) advanced to the final. The event was won by the team representing China (CHN).

== Results ==
=== Heats ===
Competed from 12:39.

==== Heat 1 ====
| Rank | Nation | Swimmers | Time | Notes |
|---|---|---|---|---|
| 1 | South Korea | Hong Suk-man; Jung Dong-ho; Kim Gyu-dae; Yoo Byung-hoon | 3:18.98 | Q |
| 2 | United States | Erik Hightower; Tony Iniguez; Tyler Byers; Josh George | 3:21.52 | |
| 3 | Japan | Yoshifumi Nagao; Kenji Kotani; Susumu Kangawa; Hitoshi Matsunaga | 3:23.17 | |

==== Heat 2 ====
| Rank | Nation | Swimmers | Time | Notes |
|---|---|---|---|---|
| 1 | China | Cui Yanfeng; Zhao Ji; Li Huzhao; Zhang Lixin | 3:08.80 | Q, WR |
| 2 | Thailand | Supachai Koysub; Prawat Wahoram; Pichet Krungget; Saichon Konjen | 3:15.65 | Q |
| 3 | France | Julien Casoli; Pierre Fairbank; Alain Fuss; Denis Lemeunier | 3:20.11 | Q |
| 4 | Mexico | Fernando Sanchez; Freddy Sandoval; Jaime Ramirez; Gonzalo Valdovinos | 3:22.56 | |

=== Final ===
Competed at 18:29.

| Rank | Nation | Swimmers | Time | Notes |
|---|---|---|---|---|
| 1st place, gold medalist(s) | China | Cui Yanfeng; Zhao Ji; Li Huzhao; Zhang Lixin | 3:05.67 | WR |
| 2nd place, silver medalist(s) | Thailand | Supachai Koysub; Prawat Wahoram; Pichet Krungget; Saichon Konjen | 3:11.63 | |
| 3rd place, bronze medalist(s) | France | Julien Casoli; Pierre Fairbank; Alain Fuss; Denis Lemeunier | 3:17.93 | |
| | South Korea | Hong Suk-man; Jung Dong-ho; Kim Gyu-dae; Yoo Byung-hoon | DQ | |

Q = qualified for final. WR = World Record. DQ = Disqualified (passing of the baton outside the take-over zone).
