= Athletics at the 2012 Summer Paralympics – Men's 4 × 400 metres relay =

The Men's 4 × 400 m relay athletics events for the 2012 Summer Paralympics took place at the London Olympic Stadium from 31 August to 8 September. One event was contested over this distance for two different classifications.

== Results ==
=== T53/T54 ===
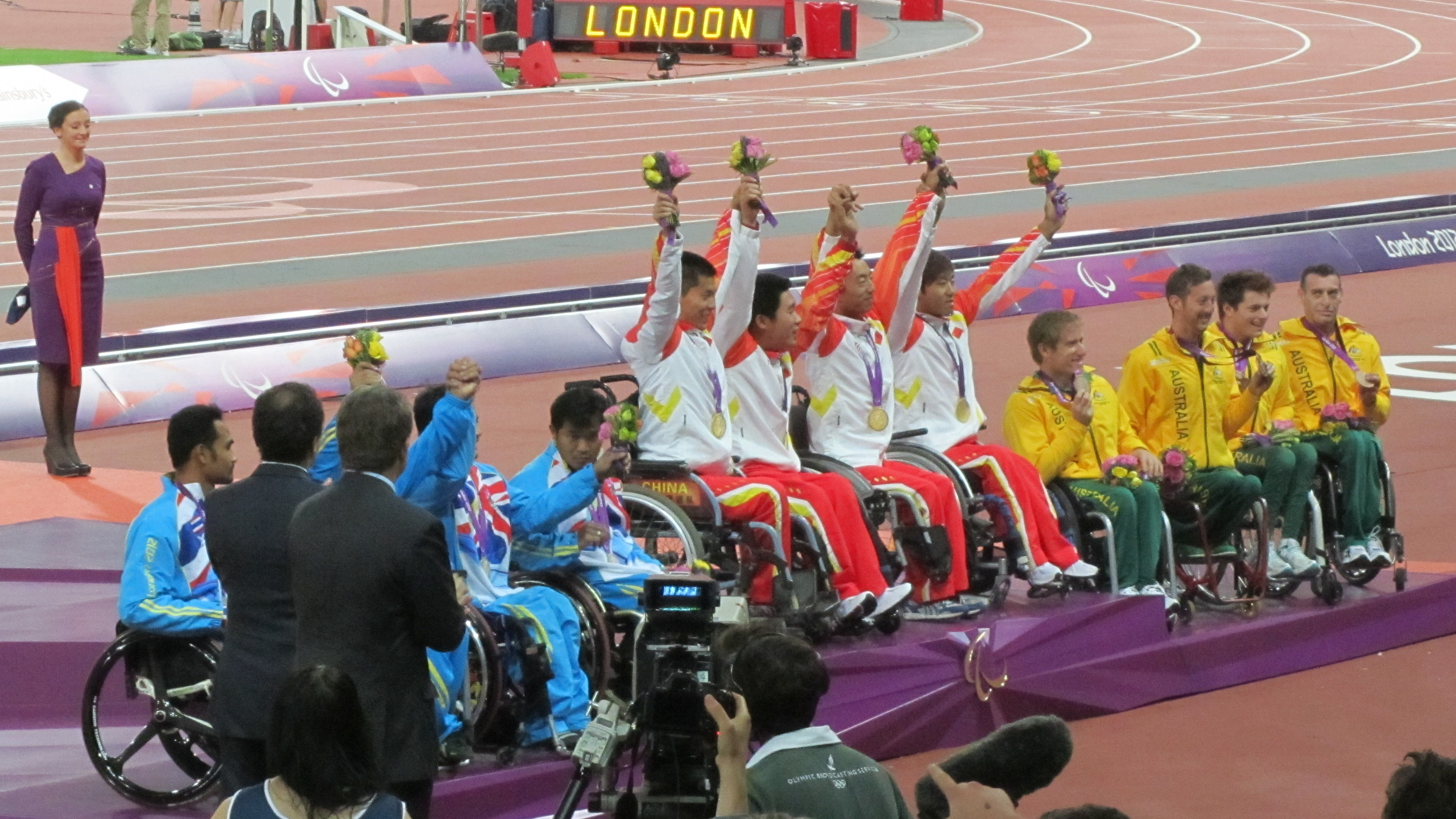
Men's 4 × 400 metres relay podium

Rank	Lane	Nation	Competitors	Time	Notes
1st place, gold medalist(s)	2	China	Liu Yang, Liu Chengming, Li Huzhao, Zhang Lixin	3:05.46	WR
2nd place, silver medalist(s)	4	Thailand	Supachai Koysub, Saichon Konjen, Sopa Intasen, Prawat Wahoram	3:13.28	SB
3rd place, bronze medalist(s)	1	Australia	Richard Nicholson, Natheniel Arkley, Matthew Cameron, Richard Colman	3:13.42	SB
4	3	South Korea	Kim Gyu-Dae, Hong Suk-Man, Yoo Byung-Hoon, Jung Dong-Ho	3:13.82	SB
