= Athletics at the 2008 Summer Paralympics – Men's 4 × 100 metre relay T53–T54 =

Men's 4x100m T53-54 at the XIII Paralympic Games
- Venue: Beijing National Stadium
- Dates: 8-9 September
- Competitors: 5
- Winning time: 49.90

Medalists
| 1st place, gold medalist(s) | | China (CHN); Zong Kai, Zhao Ji, Zhang Lixin, Li Huzhao |
| 2nd place, silver medalist(s) | | Thailand (THA); Supachai Koysub, Saichon Konjen, Prawat Wahoram, Pichet Krungget |
| 3rd place, bronze medalist(s) | | South Korea (KOR); Hong Suk-man, Jung Dong-ho, Kim Gyu-dae, Yoo Byung-hoon |

The men's 4 × 100 m T53-54 event at the 2008 Summer Paralympics took place at the Beijing National Stadium on 8-9 September. There were two heats; the teams with the four fastest times (Q) advanced to the final. The event was won by the team representing China (CHN).

== Results ==
=== Heats ===
Competed 8 September from 17:05.

==== Heat 1 ====
| Rank | Nation | Swimmers | Time | Notes |
|---|---|---|---|---|
| 1 | China | Zong Kai; Zhao Ji; Zhang Lixin; Li Huzhao | 49.89 | Q, WR |
| 2 | Thailand | Pichet Krungget; Saichon Konjen; Supachai Koysub; Prawat Wahoram | 50.71 | Q |

==== Heat 2 ====
| Rank | Nation | Swimmers | Time | Notes |
|---|---|---|---|---|
| 1 | Australia | Matthew Cameron; Kurt Fearnley; Richard Nicholson; Richard Colman | 52.60 | Q |
| 2 | South Korea | Hong Suk-man; Jung Dong-ho; Kim Gyu-dae; Yoo Byung-hoon | 52.67 | Q |
| 3 | Mexico | Gonzalo Valdovinos; Fernando Sanchez; Freddy Sandoval; Jaime Ramirez | 53.16 | |

=== Final ===
Competed 9 September at 17:45.

| Rank | Nation | Swimmers | Time | Notes |
|---|---|---|---|---|
| 1st place, gold medalist(s) | China | Zong Kai; Zhao Ji; Zhang Lixin; Li Huzhao | 49.90 | |
| 2nd place, silver medalist(s) | Thailand | Supachai Koysub; Saichon Konjen; Prawat Wahoram; Pichet Krungget | 51.93 | |
| 3rd place, bronze medalist(s) | South Korea | Hong Suk-man; Jung Dong-ho; Kim Gyu-dae; Yoo Byung-hoon | 53.52 | |
| | Australia | Matthew Cameron; Kurt Fearnley; Richard Nicholson; Richard Colman | DQ | |

Q = qualified for final. WR = World Record. DQ = Disqualified (passing of the baton outside the take-over zone).
