= Athletics at the 2008 Summer Paralympics – Women's discus throw F42–46 =

Women's Discus F42-46 at the XIII Paralympic Games
- Venue: Beijing National Stadium
- Dates: 15 September
- Competitors: 8 from 5 nations
- Winning distance: 36.99

Medalists
1st place, gold medalist(s)		Wang Jun	China
2nd place, silver medalist(s)		Yang Yue	China
3rd place, bronze medalist(s)		Zheng Baozhu	China

The women's discus F42-46 event at the 2008 Summer Paralympics took place at the Beijing National Stadium at 09:20 on 15 September. There was a single round of competition, and as there were only 8 competitors they each had 6 throws. The competition was won by Wang Jun, representing China.

== Results ==
Rank	Athlete	Nationality	Cl.	1	2	3	4	5	6	Best	Pts.	Notes
1st place, gold medalist(s)	Wang Jun	China	F42	x	34.09	34.14	34.36	x	36.99	36.99	1216	WR
2nd place, silver medalist(s)	Yang Yue	China	F44	41.04	39.46	37.44	39.09	42.38	42.06	42.38	1122	WR
3rd place, bronze medalist(s)	Zheng Baozhu	China	F42	28.19	32.07	33.19	29.62	32.70	30.64	33.19	1091	SB
4	Michaela Floeth	Germany	F44	38.25	38.87	x	x	36.73	36.40	38.87	1029	
5	Claudia Biene	Germany	F42	28.34	27.01	26.87	28.55	23.91	24.21	28.55	938	
6	Andrea Scherney	Austria	F44	29.48	x	30.52	28.67	32.09	32.29	32.29	855	SB
7	Jelena Vukovic	Croatia	F42	24.38	24.09	23.77	24.90	24.09	23.24	24.90	818	SB
8	Artimiza Sequeira	Cape Verde	F42	17.83	17.51	16.40	16.44	17.04	15.18	17.83	586	

WR = World Record. SB = Seasonal Best.
