= 2015 IPC Athletics World Championships – Men's 4 × 400 metres relay =

The men's 4x400 metres relay at the 2015 IPC Athletics World Championships was held at the Suheim Bin Hamad Stadium in Doha from 22–31 October.

== Medalists ==
Event	Gold		Silver		Bronze	
T53-54	Cui Yanfeng (T54); Liu Yang (T54); Li Huzhao (T53); Liu Chengming (T54); China	3:08.32 CR	Rawat Tana (T54); Saichon Konjen (T54); Pongsakorn Paeyo (T53); Prawat Wahoram (T54); Thailand	3.12.22 NR	Alex Adélaïde (T54); Pierre Fairbank (T53); Nicolas Brignone (T53); Julien Casoli (T54); France	3.22.44 NR
WR world record | AR area record | CR championship record | GR games record | NR national record | OR Olympic record | PB personal best | SB season best | WL world leading (in a given season)

== See also ==
- List of IPC world records in athletics
