= Athletics at the 2004 Summer Paralympics – Women's discus throw F42–46 =

Women's Discus F42-46 at the XII Paralympic Games
- Venue: Athens Olympic Stadium
- Dates: 25 September 2004
- Competitors: 16 from 11 nations
- Winning distance: 31.19

Medalists
1st place, gold medalist(s)		Zheng Bao Zhu	China
2nd place, silver medalist(s)		Claudia Biene	Germany
3rd place, bronze medalist(s)		Jelena Vukovic	Croatia

The Women's discus throw F42-46 event for amputee athletes was held at the 2004 Summer Paralympics in the Athens Olympic Stadium on 25 September. It was won by Zheng Bao Zhu, representing China.

25 Sept. 2004, 09:00

Rank	Athlete	Result	Points	Notes
1st place, gold medalist(s)	Zheng Bao Zhu (CHN)	31.19	1565	PR
2nd place, silver medalist(s)	Claudia Biene (GER)	27.11	1360	
3rd place, bronze medalist(s)	Jelena Vukovic (CRO)	23.94	1201	
4	Ivita Strode (LAT)	22.87	1147	
5	Yang Yue (CHN)	37.07	1145	PR
6	Wu Hong Ping (CHN)	42.12	1101	WR
7	Michaela Daamen (GER)	35.58	1099	
8	Tharwh Al Hajaj (JOR)	21.40	1074	
9	Andrea Scherney (AUT)	34.54	1067	
10	Stela Eneva (BUL)	32.22	995	
11	Giuliana Cum (ITA)	29.45	910	
12	Noralvis de las Heras (CUB)	27.81	859	
13	Artimiza Sequeira (CPV)	16.56	831	
14	Sabine Uthess (GER)	27.35	715	
15	Tatiana Mezinova (RUS)	23.01	711	
	Natalia Goudkova (RUS)	NMR		
