= Athletics at the 2016 Summer Paralympics – Men's 4 × 400 metres relay =

The Men's 4 x 400 metres relay athletics events for the 2016 Summer Paralympics took place at the Estádio Olímpico João Havelange between 16 and 17 September 2016. One event was contested over this distance with each leg being run by one of the two different classifications, T53 and T54.

== Schedule ==
| R | Round 1 | ½ | Semifinals | F | Final |

| Event↓/Date → | Thu 8 | Fri 9 | Sat 10 | Sun 11 | Mon 12 | Tue 13 | Wed 14 | Thu 15 | Fri 16 | Sat 17 |
|---|---|---|---|---|---|---|---|---|---|---|
| T53-54 400m relay | | | | | | | | | R | F |

== Results ==
=== T53-54 ===
Two heats were held on 16 September. The four fastest teams over both legs qualified for the final on the 17 September.

==== Round 1 - Heat 1 ====
| Rank | Lane | Nation | Competitors | Time | Notes |
|---|---|---|---|---|---|
| 1 | 5 | Thailand | Saichon Konjen (T54); Rawat Tana (T54); Pongsakorn Paeyo (T53); Prawat Wahoram (T54) | 3:08.37 SB | q |
| 2 | 7 | South Korea | Hong Suk Man (T54); Jung Dong Ho (T53); Yoo Byung Hoon (T53); Kim Gyu Dae (T54) | 3:10.73 SB | q |
| 3 | 3 | Canada | Brent Lakatos (T53); Curtis Thom (T54); Tristan Smyth (T54); Alexandre Dupont (T54) | 3:11.41 RR | q |

==== Round 1 - Heat 2 ====
| Rank | Lane | Nation | Competitors | Time | Notes |
|---|---|---|---|---|---|
| 1 | 3 | China | Cui Yanfeng (T54); Liu Yang (T54); Li Huzhao (T53); Liu Chengming (T54) | 3:04.77 | q WR |
| 2 | 7 | Great Britain | Richard Chiassaro (T54); Nathan Maguire (T54); Moatez Jomni (T53); David Weir (T54) | 3:14.43 | |
| - | 5 | France | Alex Adelaide (T54); Pierre Fairbank (T53); Nicolas Brignone (T53); Julien Casoli (T54) | DSQ | |

==== Final ====
| Rank | Lane | Nation | Competitors | Time | Notes |
|---|---|---|---|---|---|
| 1st place, gold medalist(s) | 5 | China | Cui Yanfeng (T54); Liu Yang (T54); Li Huzhao (T53); Liu Chengming (T54) | 3:04.58 | |
| 2nd place, silver medalist(s) | 1 | Thailand | Saichon Konjen (T54); Rawat Tana (T54); Pongsakorn Paeyo (T53); Prawat Wahoram (T54) | 3:07.73 | |
| 3rd place, bronze medalist(s) | 7 | Canada | Brent Lakatos (T53); Curtis Thom (T54); Tristan Smyth (T54); Alexandre Dupont (T54) | 3:08.00 RR | |
| - | 3 | South Korea | Hong Suk Man (T54); Jung Dong Ho (T53); Yoo Byung Hoon (T53); Kim Gyu Dae (T54) | DSQ | |
