= Yang Yue (athlete) =

Chinese Paralympic athlete (born 1983)

Personal information
- Born: 3 March 1983 (age 43) Dalian, China

Sport
- Sport: Paralympic athletics
Medal record
Paralympic athletics
Representing China
Paralympic Games
Gold medal – first place	2024 Paris	Discus throw F64
Silver medal – second place	2008 Beijing	Discus throw F42–46
Bronze medal – third place	2024 Paris	Shot put F64
World Championships
Silver medal – second place	2015 Doha	Discus throw F44
Silver medal – second place	2015 Doha	Shot put F44
Bronze medal – third place	2024 Kobe	Shot put F64
Asian Para Games
Silver medal – second place	2010 Guangzhou	Shot put F42/44/46
Silver medal – second place	2014 Incheon	Shot put F44
Silver medal – second place	2018 Jakarta	Shot put F43/44/62/64
Silver medal – second place	2018 Jakarta	Discus throw F43/44/62/64
Silver medal – second place	2022 Hangzhou	Shot put F64
Silver medal – second place	2022 Hangzhou	Discus throw F64

Yang Yue (Chinese: 杨月; born 3 March 1983) is a Paralympian athlete from China competing mainly in category F42–46 discus throw events.

She competed in the 2004 Summer Paralympics in Athens, Greece where she competed unsuccessfully in both the F42–46 discus and javelin.

She also competed in the 2008 Summer Paralympics in Beijing, China. There she won a silver medal in the women's F42–46 discus throw event as part of a Chinese clean sweep of medals.
