= Alain Fuss =

French Paralympic athlete

Personal information
- Born: 10 July 1968 (age 57) La Tronche, Isère, France

Sport
- Sport: Para-athletics
- Disability class: T54
Medal record
Paralympic athletics
Representing France
Paralympic Games
Bronze medal – third place	2008 Beijing	4x400m - T53/54

Alain Fuss (born 10 July 1968 in La Tronche) is a Paralympian athlete from France competing mainly in category T54 long-distance events.

Alain has competed in two Paralympics. His first appearance in Athens in 2004 he competed in the T54 5000m, 10000m and marathon without any medal success. Four years later in Beijing at the 2008 Summer Paralympics he competed in the T54 1500m, 5000m and 10000m again without winning a medal but did pick up a medal as part of the bronze medal-winning French team in the T53/54 4 × 400 m.
