= Zheng Baozhu =

Chinese Paralympic athlete

Medal record

Paralympic athletics

Representing China

Paralympic Games
| Gold medal – first place | 2004 Athens | Shot Put - F42/F46 |
| Gold medal – first place | 2004 Athens | Discus Throw - F42/F46 |
| Gold medal – first place | 2008 Beijing | Shot Put - F42/F46 |
| Bronze medal – third place | 2008 Beijing | Discus Throw - F42/F46 |

Zheng Baozhu is a Paralympian athlete from the People's Republic of China competing mainly in category F42/F46 throwing events.

She competed in the 2004 Summer Paralympics in Athens, Greece. There she won a gold medal in both the women's shot put F42/F46 event and the women's discus throw F42/F46 event. She also marginally missed out on a medal in the women's F42/F46 javelin throw, missing third place by just 4 points.

Four years later she returned to compete in her home country in the 2008 Summer Paralympics in Beijing, China. There she retained her gold medal in the women's shot put F42/F46 event, she won a bronze medal in the F42/F46 discus throw and again finished fourth in the F42/F46 javelin throw.
