= Wang Jun (parathlete) =

Chinese Paralympic athlete (born 1990)

Personal information
- Born: 30 June 1990 (age 36) Tianjin, China

Sport
- Sport: Paralympic athletics
Medal record
Representing China
Paralympic athletics
Paralympic Games
Gold medal – first place	2008 Beijing	Discus throw F42–46
Gold medal – first place	2016 Rio de Janeiro	Shot put F35
Silver medal – second place	2012 London	Shot put F35/36
Silver medal – second place	2024 Paris	Shot put F35
World Championships
Gold medal – first place	2024 Kobe	Shot put F35
Silver medal – second place	2015 Doha	Shot put F35
Silver medal – second place	2017 London	Shot put F35
Silver medal – second place	2023 Paris	Shot put F35
Silver medal – second place	2025 New Delhi	Shot put F35
Asian Para Games
Bronze medal – third place	2022 Hangzhou	Shot put F35/36/37

Wang Jun (Chinese: 王君; pinyin: Wáng Jūn; born June 30, 1990) is a Paralympian athlete from China competing mainly in throwing events. She competes in the F35 classification.

== Career ==
She competed at the 2008 Summer Paralympics and won a gold medal in the women's discus throw F42–46 event. She competed at the 2012 Summer Paralympics and won a silver medal in the women's shot put F35/36 event. She competed at the 2016 Summer Paralympics and won a gold medal in the women's shot put F35 event.

In 2017 she broke the F35 javelin record set by at the World Para Athletics Grand Prix in Beijing. The previous F35 record was made by Ukrainian Mariia Pomazan in 2014. Wang's throw was 12.1m which was 50 cm more than Pomezan's record.
