= Liu Chengming (athlete) =

Chinese Paralympic athlete (born 1987)

Personal information
- Native name: 刘成明
- Born: 20 March 1987 (age 39) Chaoyang, Liaoning, China
- Height: 170 cm (67 in)

Sport
- Country: China
- Sport: Athletics
- Disability class: T54
- Event(s): sprint, middle-distance
- Club: Liaoning Province
- Coached by: Qiu Wanchao
Medal record
Track and field
Representing China
Paralympic Games
Gold medal – first place	2012 London	400m relay – T53–54
Gold medal – first place	2016 Rio de Janeiro	4 × 400 m – T53/54
Bronze medal – third place	2012 London	400m – T54
IPC World Championships
Gold medal – first place	2011 Christchurch	400m T54
Gold medal – first place	2011 Christchurch	400m relay T53/54
Gold medal – first place	2015 Doha	800m T54
Gold medal – first place	2015 Doha	400m relay T53/54
Silver medal – second place	2015 Doha	400m T54
Asian Para Games
Gold medal – first place	2010 Guangzhou	400m T54
Gold medal – first place	2010 Guangzhou	400m relay T53/54
Gold medal – first place	2014 Incheon	400m relay T53/54
Silver medal – second place	2014 Incheon	400m T54

Liu Chengming( Chinese: 刘成明) (born 20 March 1987) is a Paralympian athlete from China competing mainly in T54 classification sprint events.

== Athletics career ==
Liu first represented China as a wheelchair racer at the 2010 Asian Para Games in Guangzhou, winning an individual gold in the 400m (T54) and a team gold with the men's 4 × 400 m relay (T53/54). The next year he competed at the 2011 IPC Athletics World Championships in Christchurch, New Zealand. In Christchurch he took two more gold medals, again in the 400m sprint and the men's 4 × 400 m (T53/54).

The next year Liu appeared at his first Summer Paralympic, the 2012 Games in London. He was again part of the Chinese team that took gold in the men's 400 metre relay, and also won an individual medal; bronze in the 100m sprint. Further success came at the 2015 World Championships in Doha, with a relay gold and two individual medals a gold in the 800m race and a silver in the 400m sprint.

== Personal history ==
Liu was born in Chaoyang, China in 1987. When he was six months old Liu contracted polio which resulted in muscle atrophy in his legs.
