= Jelena Vuković =

Croatian paralympic athlete (born 1975)

Medal record

Paralympic athletics

Representing Croatia

Paralympic Games
Bronze medal – third place	2004 Athens	Discus Throw - F42-46

Jelena Vuković (born 15 February 1975) is a paralympic athlete from Croatia competing mainly in category F42 shot put and discus events.

Vuković has competed in the shot and discus in three Paralympics firstly in 2000, then in 2004 where she won the bronze medal in the discus for F42-46 and then again in 2008. In 2008, she won the seventh place.
