= Liu Yang (wheelchair racer) =

Chinese wheelchair racer (born 1990)

Personal information
- Native name: 刘洋
- Born: 10 April 1990 (age 36) Jinzhou, China

Sport
- Country: China
- Sport: Athletics
- Disability class: T54
- Event: sprint
- Club: Liaoning province
- Coached by: Qiu Wanchao
Medal record
Track and field
Representing China
Paralympic Games
Gold medal – first place	2012 London	4 × 400 m relay – T53–54
Gold medal – first place	2016 Rio de Janeiro	4 × 400 m – T53/54
Silver medal – second place	2012 London	100 m – T54
Silver medal – second place	2016 Rio de Janeiro	100 m – T54
Silver medal – second place	2016 Rio de Janeiro	400 m – T54
IPC World Championships
Gold medal – first place	2011 Christchurch	400m relay T53/54
Gold medal – first place	2015 Doha	100m T54
Gold medal – first place	2015 Doha	400m T54
Gold medal – first place	2015 Doha	400m relay T53/54
Silver medal – second place	2017 London	100 m T54
Silver medal – second place	2019 Dubai	100 m T54
Asian Para Games
Gold medal – first place	2010 Guangzhou	100m relay T53/54
Gold medal – first place	2014 Incheon	400m relay T53/54
Gold medal – first place	2014 Incheon	400m T54
Silver medal – second place	2010 Guangzhou	800m T54

Liu Yang ( Chinese: 刘洋)(born 10 April 1990) is a Paralympian athlete from China competing mainly in T54 classification sprint events. Before achieving success as an athlete, Liu ventured into para-cycling, but switched shortly after his international cycling debut.

== Paracycling career ==
Liu took up para-sport in 2006, and at first looked at para-cycling where he was classified as a handcyclist. He competed at the 2007 UCI Para-Cycling World Championships in Boudreaux, where he failed to qualify for the final of the road race, and finished 17th in the time trial.

== Athletics career ==
Liu first represented China as a wheelchair racer at the 2011 IPC Athletics World Championships in Christchurch, New Zealand. He finished sixth in the T54 100m sprint and was part of the gold medal-winning relay team men's 4 × 400 m (T53/54).

The next year Liu appeared at his first Summer Paralympic, the 2012 Games in London. He was again part of the Chinese team that took gold in the men's 400 metre relay, and also won an individual medal; silver in the 100m sprint. Further success came at the 2015 World Championships in Doha, with a relay gold and two further first places in the 100m and 400m sprints.

== Personal history ==
Liu was born in Jinzhou, China in 1990. A tumor to his spine left him with paraplegia.
