= Claudia Biene =

German Paralympic athlete

Medal record

Paralympic athletics

Representing Germany

Paralympic Games
Silver medal – second place	2004 Athens	Discus Throw - F42-46

Claudia Biene is a Paralympian athlete from Germany competing mainly in category F42 throwing events.

Claudia won a silver medal in the F42–46 discus at the 2004 Summer Paralympics in Athens where she also competed in the javelin and long jump. Four years later in Beijing she competed in the same three events and the 100m but failed to win a medal in any of them.
