= Zong Kai =

Chinese Paralympic athlete

Personal information
- Native name: 纵凯
- Born: 9 April 1986 (age 40)

Sport
- Sport: Paralympic athletics
Medal record
Paralympic athletics
Representing China
Paralympic Games
Gold medal – first place	2008 Beijing	4x100m – T54
Asian Para Games
Bronze medal – third place	2010 Guangzhou	100m T54

Zong Kai (Chinese: 纵凯) is a Paralympian athlete from China competing mainly in category T54 Sprint events.

He competed in the 2008 Summer Paralympics in his home country in the T54 100m and 200m before combining with his teammates (Zhao Ji, Zhang Lixin, and Li Huzhao) to win the gold medal in the T53/54 4 × 100 m relay.
