= Cui Yanfeng =

Chinese Paralympic athlete

Personal information
- Native name: 崔彦峰
- Born: 9 October 1987 (age 39)

Sport
- Sport: Paralympic athletics
Medal record
Paralympic athletics
Representing China
Paralympic Games
Gold medal – first place	2008 Beijing	4x400m – T53/54
Gold medal – first place	2016 Rio de Janeiro	4x400m – T53/54
IPC Athletics World Championships
Gold medal – first place	2011 Christchurch	4x400m relay T53-54
Gold medal – first place	2015 Doha	4x400 m relay T53-54
Bronze medal – third place	2011 Christchurch	200m T54
Asian Para Games
Gold medal – first place	2010 Guangzhou	800m T54
Gold medal – first place	2010 Guangzhou	4x100m relay T53-54
Gold medal – first place	2014 Incheon	4x400m relay T53-54
Bronze medal – third place	2010 Guangzhou	200m T54
Bronze medal – third place	2010 Guangzhou	400m T54

Cui Yanfeng (Chinese: 崔彦峰) is a Paralympian athlete from China competing mainly in category T54 middle-distance events.

Yanfeng competed in both the 800m and 1500m at the 2008 Summer Paralympics in his home country. He was also part of the gold medal-winning Chinese 4 × 400 m. His teammates were Zhang Lixin, Zhao Ji, and Li Huzhao. He is married to Liu Wenjun who is also a Paralympic wheelchair racer.
