= Zhao Ji (athlete) =

Chinese Paralympic athlete

Medal record

Paralympic athletics

Representing China

Paralympic Games
Gold medal – first place	2008 Beijing	4x100m – T53/54
Gold medal – first place	2008 Beijing	4x400m - T53/54

Zhao Ji (Chinese: 赵骥) is a Paralympian athlete from China competing mainly in category T54 sprints events.

Zhao competed in the 2004 Summer Paralympics in both the 4x100 and 4x400 for the Chinese team. In the 2008 Summer Paralympics in his home country he competed across the range of events competing in the 100m, 800m and marathon and was part of the gold medal-winning Chinese team in both the 4 × 100 m and 4 × 400 m. Among his teammates were Cui Yanfeng, Zhang Lixin, Zong Kai, and Li Huzhao.
