= Saichon Konjen =

Thai Paralympic athlete

Personal information
- Born: 30 March 1983 (age 43)

Sport
- Sport: Paralympic athletics
- Disability class: T54
Medal record
Men's paralympic athletics
Representing Thailand
Paralympic Games
Silver medal – second place	2008 Beijing	100 m T54
Silver medal – second place	2008 Beijing	200 m T54
Silver medal – second place	2008 Beijing	4 × 100 m T53–T54
Silver medal – second place	2008 Beijing	4 × 400 m T53–T54
Silver medal – second place	2012 London	4 × 400 m T53–54
Silver medal – second place	2016 Rio de Janeiro	800 m T54
Silver medal – second place	2016 Rio de Janeiro	4 × 400 m T53–T54
Bronze medal – third place	2008 Beijing	400 m T54
Bronze medal – third place	2012 London	100 m T54
Bronze medal – third place	2012 London	800 m T54
Bronze medal – third place	2016 Rio de Janeiro	1500 m T54
Bronze medal – third place	2020 Tokyo	800 m T54
World Championships
Silver medal – second place	2011 Christchurch	100 m T54
Silver medal – second place	2015 Doha	200 m T54
Silver medal – second place	2015 Doha	4x400 m T53–T54
Silver medal – second place	2024 Kobe	5000 m T54
Bronze medal – third place	2024 Kobe	1500 m T54
Asian Para Games
Gold medal – first place	2014 Incheon	100m T54
Gold medal – first place	2018 Jakarta	800 m T54
Silver medal – second place	2010 Guangzhou	100 m T54
Silver medal – second place	2010 Guangzhou	200 m T54
Silver medal – second place	2010 Guangzhou	400 m T54
Silver medal – second place	2018 Jakarta	800 m T54
Silver medal – second place	2022 Hangzhou	800 m T54
Bronze medal – third place	2014 Incheon	400 m T54
Bronze medal – third place	2018 Jakarta	100 m T54

Saichon Konjen (Thai: สายชล คนเจน; born 30 March 1983) is a Paralympian athlete from Thailand competing mainly in category T54 sprint events.

== Biography ==
He competed in the 2008 Summer Paralympics in Beijing, China. There he won a silver medal in the men's 100 metres T54, a silver medal in the men's 200 metres T54, a silver medal in the men's 4 × 100 metre relay T53–54, a silver medal in the men's 4 × 400 metre relay T53–54 and a bronze medal in the men's 400 metres T54.
