= Kim Gyu-dae =

South Korean Paralympic athlete

Kim Gyu Dae
Personal information
- Nationality: South Korean
- Born: 17 January 1984 (age 42) Tongyeong, South Korea
- Height: 182 cm (6 ft 0 in)
- Weight: 70 kg (154 lb)

Sport
- Country: South Korea
- Sport: Paralympic athletics
- Disability class: T54
- Event(s): sprints, middle-distance races
- Coached by: Adam Bleakney (University of Illinois at Urbana Champaign)
Medal record
Representing South Korea
Paralympic Games
Bronze medal – third place	2008 Beijing	4 × 100 m relay – T53/54
Bronze medal – third place	2012 London	1500 m – T54
Bronze medal – third place	2016 Rio	800 m – T54
Bronze medal – third place	2016 Rio	Marathon – T54
IPC Athletics World Championships
Gold medal – first place	2013 Lyon	800m – T54
Silver medal – second place	2013 Lyon	4 × 400 m relay – T53/54

- Kim Gyu-dae
- Hangul: 김규대
- RR: Gim Gyudae
- MR: Kim Kyudae

Kim Gyu-dae (born 17 January 1984) is a Paralympic athlete from South Korea who competes in T54 track and field events.

== Athletics career ==
Kim, who is classified as a T54 classification wheelchair racer, first represented South Korea at the Summer Paralympics at the 2008 Games in Beijing, competing as part of the South Korea relay team in the 4 × 100 m and the 4 × 400 m, and in the individual 200 metres and 400 metres. He won a single medal, bronze in the 100 metre relay. Four years later, at the 2012 Summer Paralympics in London he won a second bronze medal, this time an individual success in the 1500 m (T54).

As well as Paralympic successes, Kim won three medals at the 2013 IPC Athletics World Championships, in Lyon, the most notable of which was his gold in the 800 metres (T54).

== Personal history ==
Kim was born in Tongyeong, South Korea in 1984. In 2004 whilst training for the South Korean UDT/SEAL, he suffered permanent spinal injuries during parachute training. Along with that he is a Professor at University of Illinois at Urbana-Champaign.
