= Zhang Lixin =

Chinese Paralympic athlete

Medal record

Track and field (T54)

Representing China

Paralympic Games
Gold medal – first place	2008 Beijing	200m – T54
Gold medal – first place	2008 Beijing	400m – T54
Gold medal – first place	2008 Beijing	4 × 100 m – T53–54
Gold medal – first place	2008 Beijing	4 × 400 m – T53–54
Gold medal – first place	2012 London	4 × 400 metre relay – T53/54

Zhang Lixin (Chinese: 张立新) is a Paralympian athlete from China competing mainly in category T54 sprint events.

He competed in the 2008 Summer Paralympics in Beijing, China. There he won a gold medal in the men's 200 metres – T54 event, a gold medal in the men's 400 metres – T54 event, a gold medal in the men's 4 × 100 metre relay – T53–54 event and a gold medal in the men's 4 × 400 metre relay – T53–54 event. Among his teammates were Cui Yanfeng, Zhang Ji, Zong Kai, and Li Huzhao.

Paralympics
Preceded by Wang Xiaofu	Flagbearer for China (United Kingdom) London 2012	Succeeded by Rong Jing
