= Yoo Byung-hoon =

South Korean Paralympic athlete

Personal information
- Born: 30 June 1972 (age 54)

Sport
- Sport: Paralympic athletics
Medal record
Paralympic athletics
Representing South Korea
Paralympic Games
Bronze medal – third place	2008 Beijing	4x100m T53/54
World Championships
Silver medal – second place	2011 Christchurch	4x400m relay T53-54
Silver medal – second place	2024 Kobe	400m T53
Silver medal – second place	2025 New Delhi	400m T53
Bronze medal – third place	2011 Christchurch	400m T53
Bronze medal – third place	2011 Christchurch	800m T53
Bronze medal – third place	2013 Lyon	4x400m relay T53-54
Bronze medal – third place	2019 Dubai	800m T53
Bronze medal – third place	2024 Kobe	800m T53
Bronze medal – third place	2025 New Delhi	100m T53
Asian Para Games
Silver medal – second place	2010 Guangzhou	200m T53
Silver medal – second place	2010 Guangzhou	400m T53
Silver medal – second place	2014 Incheon	400m T53
Silver medal – second place	2014 Incheon	800m T53
Silver medal – second place	2018 Jakarta	100m T53
Silver medal – second place	2022 Hangzhou	400m T53
Silver medal – second place	2022 Hangzhou	800m T53
Bronze medal – third place	2010 Guangzhou	4x100m relay T53-54
Bronze medal – third place	2014 Incheon	100m T53
Bronze medal – third place	2014 Incheon	4x400m relay T53-54

- Yoo Byung-hoon
- Hangul: 유병훈
- RR: Yu Byeonghun
- MR: Yu Pyŏnghun

Yoo Byung-hoon (born June 30, 1972) is a Paralympian athlete from South Korea competing mainly in category T53 middle-distance events.

== Career ==
Yoo competed at the 2008 Summer Paralympics in Beijing. He competed in the T53 400m, T53 800m and the T54 1500m without medaling, he also competed in the South Korean teams in the 4 × 400 m and the bronze medal-winning 4 × 100 m team.

Yoo also competed in the following games:

- 2006 IPC Athletics World Championships in Assen, Netherlands.
- 2011 IPC Athletics World Championships in Christchurch, New Zealand
- 2012 London Paralympic Games
- 2013 IPC Athletics World Championshios in Lyon, France
- 2016 Rio Paralympic Games
- 2017 World Para Athletics Championships in London
- 2019 Dubai World Para Athletics Championships
- 2020 Tokyo Paralympic Games
