= Jung Dong-ho =

South Korean Paralympic athlete

Medal record

Paralympic athletics

Representing South Korea

Paralympic Games
Bronze medal – third place	2008 Beijing	4x100m - T53/54

- Jung Dong-ho
- Hangul: 정동호
- RR: Jeong Dongho
- MR: Chŏng Tongho

Jung Dong-ho (born January 11, 1975) is a Paralympian athlete from South Korea competing mainly in category T53 Sprint events.

Jung competed in the 2008 Summer Paralympics in Beijing in the individual 100m and 400m as well as part of the South Korean teams in the 4 × 100 m and 4 × 400 m. He won a bronze medal in the 4 × 100 m with his Korean teammates.
