= Li Huzhao =

Chinese Paralympic athlete

Personal information
- Native name: 李虎召
- Born: January 18, 1989 (age 37) Shijiazhuang, China
Medal record
Men's paralympic athletics
Representing China
Paralympic Games
Gold medal – first place	2008 Beijing	4 × 100 m T53–T54
Gold medal – first place	2008 Beijing	4 × 400 m T53–T54
Gold medal – first place	2008 Beijing	800 m T53
Gold medal – first place	2016 Rio de Janeiro	4 × 400 m – T53/54
Silver medal – second place	2008 Beijing	400 m T53
IPC World Championships
Gold medal – first place	2011 Christchurch	100 m T53
Gold medal – first place	2015 Doha	400 m T53
Gold medal – first place	2015 Doha	4x400 m T53–T54
Silver medal – second place	2015 Doha	100 m T53
Silver medal – second place	2015 Doha	800 m T53
Asian Para Games
Gold medal – first place	2010 Guangzhou	200m T53
Gold medal – first place	2010 Guangzhou	400m T53
Gold medal – first place	2010 Guangzhou	4 × 100 m relay T53–54
Gold medal – first place	2014 Incheon	100m T53
Gold medal – first place	2014 Incheon	400m T53
Gold medal – first place	2014 Incheon	800m T53
Gold medal – first place	2014 Incheon	4 × 400 m relay T53–54
Silver medal – second place	2010 Guangzhou	100m T53

Li Huzhao (Chinese: 李虎召; pinyin: Lǐ Hǔzhāo; born January 18, 1989) is a Paralympian athlete from China competing mainly in category T53 sprint events.

He competed in the 2008 Summer Paralympics in Beijing, China. There he won a gold medal in the men's 4 × 100 metre relay – T53–54 event, a gold medal in the men's 4 × 400 metre relay – T53–54 event, a gold medal in the men's 800 metres – T53 event and a silver medal in the men's 400 metres – T53 event. His teammates in the relays were Cui Yanfeng, Zhang Lixin, Zong Kai, and Zhao Ji.
