= Athletics at the 2016 Summer Paralympics – Men's 800 metres =

The Men's 800m athletics events for the 2016 Summer Paralympics take place at the Estádio Olímpico João Havelange from September 8 to September 16, 2016. A total of four events were contested over this distance for five different classifications.

== Schedule ==
R	Round 1	½	Semifinals	F	Final

Event↓/Date →	Thu 8	Fri 9	Sat 10	Sun 11	Mon 12	Tue 13	Wed 14	Thu 15	Fri 16	Sat 17
T34 800m						R	F			
T36 800m										F
T53 800m							R	F		
T54 800m							R	F		

== Medal summary ==
Classification	Gold		Silver		Bronze	
T34	Mohamed Alhammadi; United Arab Emirates	1:40.24	Walid Ktila; Tunisia	1:40.31	Rheed McCracken; Australia	1:41.25
T36	James Turner; Australia	2:02.39 WR	Paul Blake; Great Britain	2:09.65	William Stedman; New Zealand	2:11.98 PB
T53	Pongsakorn Paeyo; Thailand	1:40.78	Pierre Fairbank; France	1:40.97	Brent Lakatos; Canada	1:41.09
T54	Marcel Hug; Switzerland	1:33.76 SB	Saichon Konjen; Thailand	1:34.74 SB	Kim Gyu-dae; South Korea	1:34.98 PB

== Results ==
The following were the results of the finals of each of the Men's 800 metres events in each of the classifications. Further details of each event are available on that event's dedicated page.

=== T34 ===
The T34 category is for wheelchair athletes with cerebral palsy. Athletes in this category have minimal limitations or control problems in their arms and trunk while pushing a wheelchair.

17:50 14 September 2016:

Rank	Lane	Bib	Name	Nationality	Reaction	Time	Notes
1st place, gold medalist(s)	5	2300	Mohamed Alhammadi	United Arab Emirates		1:40.24	
2nd place, silver medalist(s)	7	2277	Walid Ktila	Tunisia		1:40.31	
3rd place, bronze medalist(s)	1	1057	Rheed McCracken	Australia		1:41.25	
4	3	1456	Henry Manni	Finland		1:41.92	
5	6	1521	Isaac Towers	Great Britain		1:43.45	
6	4	2368	Austin Pruitt	United States		1:45.55	
7	2	2181	Bojan Mitic	Switzerland		1:50.74	
	8	1212	Austin Smeenk	Canada			DSQ

=== T36 ===
The T36 category is for ambulant athletes with cerebral palsy. These athletes do not have the capacity to remain still and they show involuntary movements with all four limbs affected. They usually walk without assistive devices. 19:23 17 September 2016:

Rank	Lane	Bib	Name	Nationality	Reaction	Time	Notes
1st place, gold medalist(s)	7	1066	James Turner	Australia		2:02.40	WR
2nd place, silver medalist(s)	5	1498	Paul Blake	Great Britain		2:09.65	
3rd place, bronze medalist(s)	3	1963	William Stedman	New Zealand		2:11.98	
4	6	1013	Sid Ali Bouzourine	Algeria		2:15.03	
5	4	1919	Gabriel de Jesus Cuadra Holmann	Nicaragua		2:16.21	
6	8	2020	Krzysztof Ciuksza	Poland		2:16.90	

=== T53 ===
The T53 category is for wheelchair athletes with normal use of arms and hands, no or limited trunk function, and no leg function.

19:01 15 September 2016:

Rank	Lane	Bib	Name	Nationality	Reaction	Time	Notes
1st place, gold medalist(s)	4	2232	Pongsakorn Paeyo	Thailand		1:40.78	
2nd place, silver medalist(s)	5	1472	Pierre Fairbank	France		1:40.97	
3rd place, bronze medalist(s)	8	1208	Brent Lakatos	Canada		1:41.09	
4	1	2375	Brian Siemann	United States		1:41.11	
5	3	2352	Joshua George	United States		1:41.23	
6	6	1249	Huzhao Li	China		1:41.91	
7	7	1778	Dong-ho Jung	South Korea		1:42.89	
8	2	1794	Hamad Aladwani	Kuwait		1:50.62	

=== T54 ===
The T54 category is for wheelchair athletes with no leg function, but near full arm function and reasonable to normal trunk function. Typically this may be caused by a lower spinal cord injury or spinal cord birth defect.

12:02 15 September 2016:

Rank	Lane	Bib	Name	Nationality	Reaction	Time	Notes
1st place, gold medalist(s)	4	2179	Marcel Hug	Switzerland		1:33.76	
2nd place, silver medalist(s)	1	2229	Saichon Konjen	Thailand		1:34.74	
3rd place, bronze medalist(s)	5	1779	Gyu-dae Kim	South Korea		1:34.98	
4	2	1240	Yanfeng Cui	China		1:35.03	
5	8	1254	Yang Liu	China		1:35.18	
6	6	1523	David Weir	Great Britain		1:35.20	
7	3	1930	Kenny van Weeghel	Netherlands		1:36.01	
	7	2275	Yassine Gharbi	Tunisia			DSQ
