= Peleg (name) =

Peleg is a masculine given name, and a surname. Historically, Peleg was one of the two sons of Eber, the ancestor of the Hebrews. Other notable people with the name include:

== Given name ==
- Peleg Arnold, lawyer, tavern-keeper, jurist, and statesman from Smithfield, Rhode Island
- Peleg Chandler, lawyer, journalist, and politician
- Peleg Coffin Jr., financier, insurer, and politician
- Peleg Emory Aldrich, Teacher, lawyer, politician, and jurist in Massachusetts
- Peleg Nott, 18th-century African American leader
- Peleg Sanford, Rhode Island colonial governor
- Peleg Sanford, Rhode Island colonial governor
- Peleg Sprague, politician from Maine
- Peleg Sprague, politician from New Hampshire
- Peleg Tallman, Representative from Massachusetts
- Peleg Wadsworth, officer during the Revolutionary War, and a Congressman
- Peleg Wiswall, lawyer, judge, and politician, Nova Scotia

== Surname ==
- Anat Peleg (born 1957), author
- Dana G. Peleg (born 1969), Israeli writer, translator, journalist and LGBTQI activist
- Danit Peleg, Israeli fashion designer of printed clothing
- David Peleg, historian and diplomat
- David Peleg (computer scientist), computer scientist
- Guy Peleg (born 1969), Israeli journalist, publicist, and commentator
- Hila Peleg (born 1976), Israeli filmmaker
- Kobi Peleg (born 1958), Israeli professor of Emergency and Disaster Management
- Matan Peleg, Guatemalan footballer
- Israel Peleg (born 1949), politician
- Orit Peleg, Israeli biophysicist

== Fictional characters ==
- Capt. Peleg, Moby Dick fictional character, retired ship-captain and "fighting"-Quaker part-owner of whaling ship

== See also ==
- Peleg (disambiguation)
