= Archery at the 2016 Summer Paralympics – Qualification =

There were 140 qualifying places available for archery at the 2016 Summer Paralympics: 80 for men and 60 for women.

Each National Paralympic Committee (NPC) is permitted to enter a maximum of 13 competitors, 8 male, 5 female. NPC can enter a further two female athletes in women's compound W1 or compound open as world individual or mixed team champion in that event, so a theoretical maximum of fifteen archers is possible across the nine events.

NPCs that qualify at least a single individual man and woman in a specific discipline – compound W1, compound open or recurve open – are able to enter a two-member mixed team to the relevant team event, while also having each member compete in the individual event. If an NPC qualifies multiple archers in each gender in a specific discipline, however, they remain restricted to a single team in the mixed team event in that discipline.

Six places are reserved for Brazil as the host nation, one in each individual event, and as a consequence, Brazil will enter a team in each of the Mixed Pairs events. A further eleven will be decided by the Bipartite Commission. The remaining 123 places are then allocated through a qualification process, in which archers earned quota places for their respective NPCs, though not necessarily for themselves.

To be eligible to participate in the Paralympic Games after the NPC has obtained a quota place, all archers must be classified with a confirmed or review sports status, to ensure Paralympic eligibility, and have achieved a minimum qualification score (MQS):

- Men's ind. compound W1: 575
- Men's ind. compound open: 630
- Men's ind. recurve open: 560
- Women's ind. compound W1: 500
- Women's ind. compound open: 600
- Women's ind. recurve open: 520

The MQS must have been achieved between 1 July 2015 and 1 July 2016.

== Timeline ==
| Event | Date | Venue |
|---|---|---|
| Start date for MQS performances | 1 July 2015 | - |
| 2015 Parapan American Games | 7–15 August 2015 | (Canada) Toronto |
| 2015 Para Archery World Championships | 23–30 August 2015 | (Germany) Donaueschingen |
| 2015 Asian qualification event | November 2015 | (Thailand) Bangkok |
| 2016 European qualification event 2016 World Archery Europe Para Championships | 2–10 April 2016 | (France) Challans |
| 2016 Final World qualification event | tbc | |
| Bipartite Commission process | 1 May 2016 | |
| End date for MQS performances | 1 July 2016 | - |
| Final deadline for entries | 15 August 2016 | - |

== Qualification details ==
Places are awarded to the NPC, not the individual athlete. Where an athlete's name appears, the athlete's NPC has selected that athlete to take this place in Rio; this athlete may or may not have gained the qualification.

Qualifiers for the Paralympic Games 2016 - Archery
| Qualification Event | Men | | | Women | | |
| Qualification Event | Compound W1 (max 2 per NPC) | Compound Open (max 3 per NPC) | Recurve Open (max 3 per NPC) | Compound W1 (max 2 per NPC)* | Compound Open (max 2 per NPC)* | Recurve Open (max 3 per NPC) |
|---|---|---|---|---|---|---|
| 2015 World Para; Archery Championships; Donaueschingen, Germany | China; Czech Republic; Finland; Germany; Great Britain; Great Britain; Italy; ~~Russia~~; United States | Australia; China; Finland; France; Great Britain; Great Britain; Iran; Italy; Italy; Italy; South Korea; ~~Russia~~; Slovakia; South Africa; Switzerland; Turkey; Turkey; United States; United States | China; China; China; Great Britain; Iran; Iran; Iraq; Italy; South Korea; South Korea; South Korea; Mongolia; Poland; ~~Russia~~; ~~Russia~~; ~~Russia~~; United States; United States; Brazil | China; China; Great Britain; Great Britain; South Korea; ~~Russia~~; Spain; United States | China; China; Great Britain; Italy; South Korea; ~~Russia~~; Turkey; Brazil | China; China; France; Germany; Great Britain; Greece; Iran; Italy; South Korea; Latvia; Poland; ~~Russia~~; ~~Russia~~; ~~Russia~~; Thailand; Ukraine; Ukraine; Brazil; Brazil; United States |
| 2015 Para PanAmerican Games; Toronto, Canada | — | ~~United States~~ United States; Canada | Brazil; Brazil | — | Canada | United States; Brazil |
| 2016 Asian Qualifier; Bangkok, Thailand | Iran | China; Thailand | Mongolia; Thailand | | Japan | China; Iran |
| 2016 European Qualifier; Cevilles, France | Slovakia | ~~Russia~~; Great Britain | France; Italy | France | Germany | Turkey; Turkey |
| 2016 Final Paralympic Qualifier; Nove Mesto, (Czech Republic) | France; South Korea | Iceland; Poland; Spain | Czech Republic; Germany; Japan; Chinese Taipei | Czech Republic; Turkey | Iran; Spain; Ukraine | Iraq; Mongolia; Chinese Taipei |
| Host Nation Quotas | Brazil | Brazil | - | Brazil | - | - |
| Bipartite Commission quotas | | | | | | |
| Total : 140 | 16 | 32 | 32 | 12 | 16 | 32 |

* extra place available to world champions (individual or mixed pairs) only. Max 1 per NPC for all other nations.
Following the McLaren Report on State sponsored doping in Russia, the Russia Paralympic team was excluded from the Games. As a consequence, Russian qualifiers in Archery were excluded.

=== Mixed team events ===
There is no direct qualification for the mixed pairs events, and an NPC may enter one team (1 man, 1 woman) per event if they have qualified those archers from individual events. However, since Rio 2016 quota places in individual events were awarded to the top finishers in the equivalent mixed pairs event at the 2015 World Para Archery Championships in Donau, Germany, a minimum number of teams per event is guaranteed.

On 5 September 2016, the IPC published the full entry lists for all mixed team events in archery. The following teams will enter:

Qualifiers for team events at the Paralympic Games 2016 - Archery
| Event | Compound W1 | Compound Open | Recurve Open |
|---|---|---|---|
| Qualifiers | China; Czech Republic; France; Great Britain; South Korea; Spain; United States | Brazil; Canada; China; Great Britain; Iran; Italy; South Korea; Spain; Turkey; Spain | Brazil; China; Chinese Taipei; Czech Republic; France; Germany; Great Britain; Iran; Iraq; Italy; Latvia; Mongolia; Poland; South Korea; Thailand; Turkey |
| Teams | 7 | 10 | 16 |
