= Athletics at the 2024 Summer Paralympics – Men's 100 metres T36 =

Men's 100 metres T36 at the XVII Paralympic Games
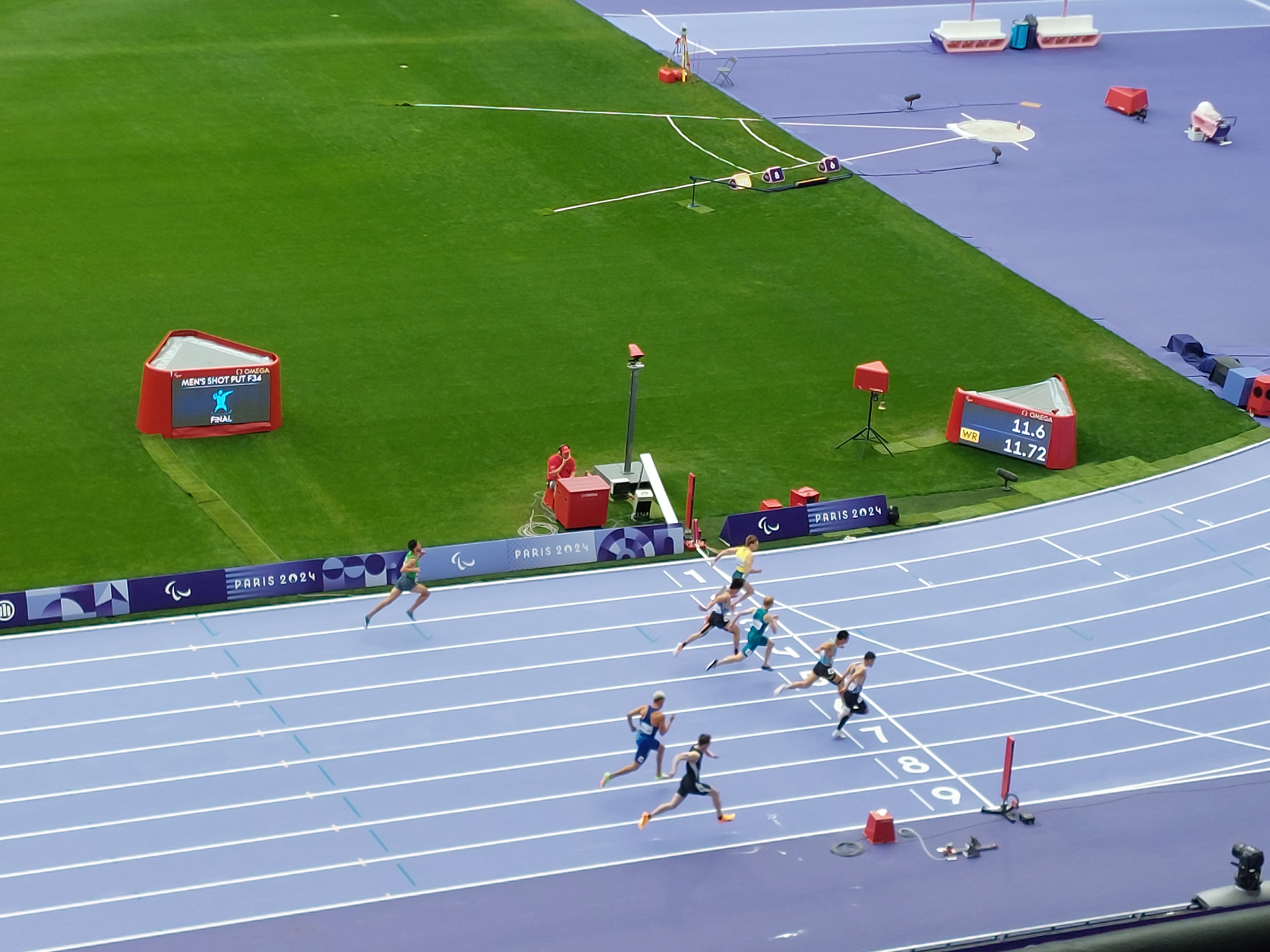
- Venue: Stade de France
- Dates: 6 September 2024 (round 1); 7 September 2024 (final)
- Competitors: 11 from 9 nations
- Winning time: 11.85 =PR, SB

Medalists
1st place, gold medalist(s)		Yang Yifei	China
2nd place, silver medalist(s)		Evgenii Torsunov	Neutral Paralympic Athletes
3rd place, bronze medalist(s)		James Turner	Australia

100 metres at the 2024 Summer Paralympics
Men · T11 · T12 · T13 · T34 · T35 · T36 · T37 · T38 · T44 · T47 · T51 · T52 · T53 · T54 · T63 · T64
Women · T11 · T12 · T13 · T34 · T35 · T36 · T37 · T38 · T47 · T53 · T54 · T63 · T64

The men's 100 metres T36 event at the 2024 Summer Paralympics in Paris, took place on 1 September 2024.

The T36 category is for ambulant athletes with cerebral palsy. These athletes do not have the capacity to remain still and they show involuntary movements with all four limbs affected. They usually walk without assistive devices.

== Records ==
Prior to the competition, the existing records were as follows:

World Record	James Turner (AUS)	11.72	(United Arab Emirates) Dubai	10 November 2019
Paralympic Record	Deng Peicheng (CHN)	11.85	(Japan) Tokyo	4 September 2021

Area	Time		Athlete	Location	Date
Africa	11.99		(Algeria) Mokhtar Didane	(France) Paris	15 July 2023
America	11.83		(Argentina) Alexis Chávez	(Chile) Santiago	24 November 2023
Asia	11.79		(China) Yang Yifei	(United Arab Emirates) Dubai	10 November 2019
Europe	11.90		(Russia) Evgenii Shvetsov	(France) Lyon	22 July 2013
Oceania	11.72	WR	(Australia) James Turner	(United Arab Emirates) Dubai	10 November 2019

== Results ==
=== Round 1 ===
First 3 in each heat (Q) and the next 2 fastest (q) advance to the Final.

==== Heat 1 ====
Rank	Lane	Athlete	Nation	Time	Notes
1	5	Yang Yifei	China	11.88	Q, SB
2	8	Evgenii Torsunov	Neutral Paralympic Athletes	12.08	Q, SB
3	4	James Turner	Australia	12.09	Q
4	6	William Stedman	New Zealand	12.41	q, SB
5	3	Oleksandr Lytvynenko	Ukraine	12.98	SB
—	7	Mokhtar Didane	Algeria	DQ	R17.8
Source:				Wind: +0.2 m/s	

==== Heat 2 ====
Rank	Lane	Athlete	Nation	Time	Notes
1	6	Alexis Chávez	Argentina	11.86	Q, SB
2	5	Deng Peicheng	China	12.13	Q
3	4	Aser Ramos	Brazil	12.45	Q, SB
4	7	Fakhr Thelaidjia	Algeria	12.58	q, PB
5	3	Izzat Turgunov	Uzbekistan	12.82	SB
6	8	Roman Pavlyk	Ukraine	12.88	SB
Source:				Wind: +0.5 m/s	

=== Final ===
Rank	Lane	Athlete	Nation	Time	Notes
1st place, gold medalist(s)	3	James Turner	Australia	11.85	PR, SB
2nd place, silver medalist(s)	7	Alexis Chávez	Argentina	11.88 (.871)	
3rd place, bronze medalist(s)	6	Yang Yifei	China	11.88 (.877)	=SB
4	5	Evgenii Torsunov	Neutral Paralympic Athletes	11.95	SB
5	4	Deng Peicheng	China	12.00	
6	9	William Stedman	New Zealand	12.35	PB
7	8	Aser Ramos	Brazil	12.38	SB
8	2	Fakhr Thelaidjia	Algeria	12.56	PB
Source:				Wind: +0.8 m/s	
