= Paul Blake (actor, born 1949) =

English actor (born 1949)

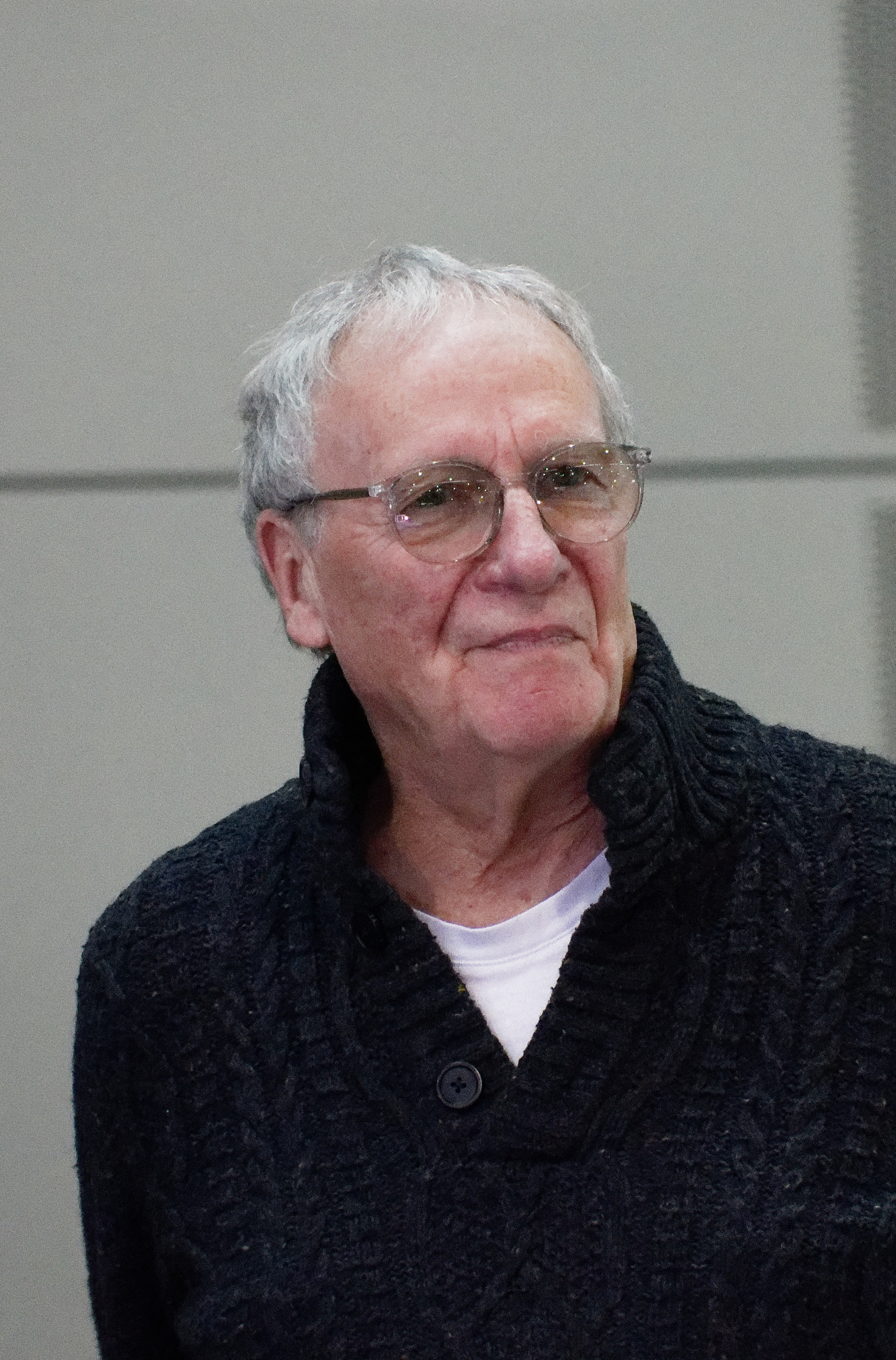
- Blake at the Comic Con Stuttgart in 2025
- Born: 1949 (age 76–77); Birmingham, England
- Occupation: Actor
- Years active: 1971-present
- Known for: Greedo in Star Wars
- Children: Paul

Paul Blake (born 1949) is an English actor. He is best known for portraying Greedo in Star Wars.

== Career ==
Blake got his part as Greedo on Star Wars in 1977 when his friend Anthony Daniels (portrayer of C-3PO) recommended him when Lucasfilm was seeking actors for the cantina scene. They previously worked together on Daniels' first television job.

He also had minor roles in Some of My Best Friends Are... and Hennessy, as well as some roles in television series such as Down to Earth and Crossroads. He played many roles in theatres both in the UK and abroad; including the title role in Macbeth at Salisbury Playhouse and Charles Swann in the Glasgow Citizen's Theatre production A Waste of Time (based on Proust's À la recherche du temps perdu) amongst many others.

== Personal life ==
Blake has five children with Kate, an actress, who initially trained at The Royal Ballet School; their youngest son, also called Paul, is a gold medal-winning Paralympic athlete who won the 400m T36 at the 2016 Rio Paralympics. They also have seven grandchildren. Paul has a daughter, Lucy, from a previous marriage and two more granddaughters.

== Filmography ==
=== Film ===
Year	Title	Role	Notes	Ref.
1971	Some of My Best Friends Are...	Kenny		
1975	Hennessy	Rally leader		
1977	Star Wars: Episode IV	Greedo	Uncredited	
1987	The Second Victory	Cockney soldier		
2015	Elstree 1976	Himself		
2017	Life After Flash	Himself		
2020	The Free Ranger	Himself		

=== Television ===
Year	Title	Role	Notes
1975	Jackanory Playhouse	Minstrel	One episode
1976	Clayhanger	Arnold	One episode
1978	The Devil's Crown	Bernard de Ventadour	One episode
1981	The Borgias	Hunchback	One episode
1996	Wycliffe	Journalist	One episode
1997	Melissa	Third editor	One episode
1999	The Blonde Bombshell	Director	One episode
2001	Down to Earth	Mr. Hobart	One episode
2009	Rosamunde Pilcher	Arzt	One episode
2015	These Are the Actors You're Looking For!	Himself	One episode
2015	Whenever!...w/ Jamie Stangroom	Himself	One episode
2019	The One Show	Himself	One episode
