= Athletics at the 2016 Summer Paralympics – Men's 800 metres T36 =

Men's 800 metres T36 at the XV Paralympic Games
- Venue: Estádio Olímpico João Havelange
- Dates: 17 September 2016
- Competitors: 6 from 6 nations

Medalists
1st place, gold medalist(s)		James Turner	Australia
2nd place, silver medalist(s)		Paul Blake	Great Britain
3rd place, bronze medalist(s)		William Stedman	New Zealand

The T36 category is for ambulant athletes with cerebral palsy. These athletes do not have the capacity to remain still and they show involuntary movements with all four limbs affected. They usually walk without assistive devices.

The Athletics at the 2016 Summer Paralympics – Men's 800 metres T36 event at the 2016 Paralympic Games took place on 17 September 2016, at the Estádio Olímpico João Havelange.

== Final ==
19:23 17 September 2016:

Rank	Lane	Bib	Name	Nationality	Reaction	Time	Notes
1st place, gold medalist(s)	7	1066	James Turner	Australia		2:02.40	WR
2nd place, silver medalist(s)	5	1498	Paul Blake	Great Britain		2:09.65	
3rd place, bronze medalist(s)	3	1963	William Stedman	New Zealand		2:11.98	
4	6	1013	Sid Ali Bouzourine	Algeria		2:15.03	
5	4	1919	Gabriel de Jesus Cuadra Holmann	Nicaragua		2:16.21	
6	8	2020	Krzysztof Ciuksza	Poland		2:16.90	
