= Judo at the 2016 Summer Paralympics – Qualification =

This article details the qualifying phase for Judo at the 2016 Summer Paralympics. The competition at these Games will comprise a total of 132 athletes coming from their respective NPCs; each has been allowed to enter a maximum of 13 (seven for men, six for women, and in either case, one per division). Host nation Brazil has reserved a spot in each of all 13 events, while 13 are made available to NPCs through a Bipartite Commission Invitation.

The remaining judoka must undergo a qualifying process to earn a spot for the Games through the world ranking list prepared by IBSA that begins on December 31, 2014, and then concludes one year later on the same date.

The gold medal winner in each division of the 2014 IBSA World Championships earns a quota place for his or her NPC.

The top 9 men and top 5 women from the world rankings, not including the world champion, in each division must directly qualify, ensuring that the NPC is subjected to a limit of 1 judoka per division. If an NOC contains more than a single male athlete ranked in the top 9, or a single female in the top 6 of the world ranking list, the NPC can decide which of their athletes obtain the quota places.

== Men's events ==
=== Extra-lightweight (60 kg) ===
Section	Places	NOC	Qualified judoka
Host nation	1	Brazil	
2014 IBSA World Championships	1	Algeria	
IBSA World Ranking List (as of May 30, 2016)	9	Argentina	
IBSA World Ranking List (as of May 30, 2016)	9	Azerbaijan	
IBSA World Ranking List (as of May 30, 2016)	9	Japan	
IBSA World Ranking List (as of May 30, 2016)	9	Kazakhstan	
IBSA World Ranking List (as of May 30, 2016)	9	Mongolia	
IBSA World Ranking List (as of May 30, 2016)	9	~~Russia~~	—N/a
IBSA World Ranking List (as of May 30, 2016)	9	South Korea	
IBSA World Ranking List (as of May 30, 2016)	9	Uruguay	
IBSA World Ranking List (as of May 30, 2016)	9	Uzbekistan	
IBSA World Ranking List (as of May 30, 2016)	9	Chinese Taipei	Chang You
Invitational	1	Romania	
Total	12		

=== Half-lightweight (66 kg) ===
Section	Places	NOC	Qualified judoka
Host nation	1	Brazil	
2014 IBSA World Championships	1	Azerbaijan	
IBSA World Ranking List (as of May 30, 2016)	9	Japan	
IBSA World Ranking List (as of May 30, 2016)	9	Mongolia	
IBSA World Ranking List (as of May 30, 2016)	9	Puerto Rico	
IBSA World Ranking List (as of May 30, 2016)	9	Russia	
IBSA World Ranking List (as of May 30, 2016)	9	South Korea	
IBSA World Ranking List (as of May 30, 2016)	9	Spain	
IBSA World Ranking List (as of May 30, 2016)	9	Ukraine	
IBSA World Ranking List (as of May 30, 2016)	9	Uzbekistan	
IBSA World Ranking List (as of May 30, 2016)	9	Venezuela	
Invitational	1	Portugal	
Total	12		

=== Lightweight (73 kg) ===
Section	Places	NOC	Qualified judoka
Host nation	1	Brazil	
2014 IBSA World Championships	1	Azerbaijan	
IBSA World Ranking List (as of May 30, 2016)	9	Algeria	
IBSA World Ranking List (as of May 30, 2016)	9	Cuba	
IBSA World Ranking List (as of May 30, 2016)	9	Germany	
IBSA World Ranking List (as of May 30, 2016)	9	Japan	
IBSA World Ranking List (as of May 30, 2016)	9	Russia	
IBSA World Ranking List (as of May 30, 2016)	9	Spain	
IBSA World Ranking List (as of May 30, 2016)	9	Ukraine	
IBSA World Ranking List (as of May 30, 2016)	9	Uzbekistan	
IBSA World Ranking List (as of May 30, 2016)	9	Venezuela	
Invitational	1	Argentina	
Total	12		

=== Half-middleweight (81 kg) ===
Section	Places	NOC	Qualified judoka
Host nation	1	Brazil	
2014 IBSA World Championships	1	Mexico	
IBSA World Ranking List (as of May 30, 2016)	9	Argentina	
IBSA World Ranking List (as of May 30, 2016)	9	Azerbaijan	
IBSA World Ranking List (as of May 30, 2016)	9	France	
IBSA World Ranking List (as of May 30, 2016)	9	Germany	
IBSA World Ranking List (as of May 30, 2016)	9	Great Britain	
IBSA World Ranking List (as of May 30, 2016)	9	Iran	
IBSA World Ranking List (as of May 30, 2016)	9	South Korea	
IBSA World Ranking List (as of May 30, 2016)	9	Ukraine	
IBSA World Ranking List (as of May 30, 2016)	9	Uzbekistan	
Invitational	1	Belarus	
Total	12		

=== Middleweight (90 kg) ===
Section	Places	NOC	Qualified judoka
Host nation	1	Brazil	
2014 IBSA World Championships	1	United States	
IBSA World Ranking List (as of May 30, 2016)	9	Argentina	
IBSA World Ranking List (as of May 30, 2016)	9	Cuba	
IBSA World Ranking List (as of May 30, 2016)	9	Georgia	
IBSA World Ranking List (as of May 30, 2016)	9	Great Britain	
IBSA World Ranking List (as of May 30, 2016)	9	Japan	
IBSA World Ranking List (as of May 30, 2016)	9	Russia	
IBSA World Ranking List (as of May 30, 2016)	9	Spain	
IBSA World Ranking List (as of May 30, 2016)	9	Ukraine	
IBSA World Ranking List (as of May 30, 2016)	9	Uzbekistan	
Invitational	1	Canada	
Total	12		

=== Half-heavyweight (100 kg) ===
Section	Places	NOC	Qualified judoka
Host nation	1	Brazil	Antônio Tenório Silva
IBSA World Ranking List (as of May 30, 2016)	10	Azerbaijan	Abdullakhanli Kanan
IBSA World Ranking List (as of May 30, 2016)	10	Cuba	Fernandez Sastre Yordani
IBSA World Ranking List (as of May 30, 2016)	10	Great Britain	Chris Skelley
IBSA World Ranking List (as of May 30, 2016)	10	Iran	Hamed Alizadeh
IBSA World Ranking List (as of May 30, 2016)	10	South Korea	Choi Gwang Geun
IBSA World Ranking List (as of May 30, 2016)	10	Turkey	Ibrahim Bolukbasi
IBSA World Ranking List (as of May 30, 2016)	10	Ukraine	Oleksandr Pominov
IBSA World Ranking List (as of May 30, 2016)	10	United States	Porter Myles
IBSA World Ranking List (as of May 30, 2016)	10	Uzbekistan	Shirin Sharipov
IBSA World Ranking List (as of May 30, 2016)	10	Germany	Oliver Upmann
Invitational	1	Greece	Theoklitos Papachristos
Total	12		

=== Heavyweight (+100 kg) ===
Section	Places	NOC	Qualified judoka
Host nation	1	Brazil	
2014 IBSA World Championships	1	Uzbekistan	
IBSA World Ranking List (as of May 30, 2016)	9	Azerbaijan	
IBSA World Ranking List (as of May 30, 2016)	9	Cuba	
IBSA World Ranking List (as of May 30, 2016)	9	Great Britain	
IBSA World Ranking List (as of May 30, 2016)	9	Iran	
IBSA World Ranking List (as of May 30, 2016)	9	Japan	
IBSA World Ranking List (as of May 30, 2016)	9	Russia	
IBSA World Ranking List (as of May 30, 2016)	9	Turkey	
IBSA World Ranking List (as of May 30, 2016)	9	United States	
IBSA World Ranking List (as of May 30, 2016)	9	Venezuela	
Invitational	1	Iraq	
Total	12		

== Women's events ==
=== Extra-lightweight (48 kg) ===
Section	Places	NOC	Qualified judoka
Host nation	1	Brazil	
2014 IBSA World Championships	1	China	
IBSA World Ranking List (as of May 30, 2016)	5	Argentina	
IBSA World Ranking List (as of May 30, 2016)	5	Chinese Taipei	Lee Kai-lin
IBSA World Ranking List (as of May 30, 2016)	5	Germany	
IBSA World Ranking List (as of May 30, 2016)	5	Russia	
IBSA World Ranking List (as of May 30, 2016)	5	Ukraine	
Invitational	1	Turkey	
Total	8		

=== Half-lightweight (52 kg) ===
Section	Places	NOC	Qualified judoka
Host nation	1	Brazil	
2014 IBSA World Championships	1	Ukraine	
IBSA World Ranking List (as of May 30, 2016)	5	Canada	
IBSA World Ranking List (as of May 30, 2016)	5	France	
IBSA World Ranking List (as of May 30, 2016)	5	Germany	
IBSA World Ranking List (as of May 30, 2016)	5	Russia	
IBSA World Ranking List (as of May 30, 2016)	5	Uzbekistan	
Invitational	1	Algeria	
Total	8		

=== Lightweight (57 kg) ===
Section	Places	NOC	Qualified judoka
Host nation	1	Brazil	
2014 IBSA World Championships	1	Ukraine	
IBSA World Ranking List (as of May 30, 2016)	5	Azerbaijan	
IBSA World Ranking List (as of May 30, 2016)	5	China	
IBSA World Ranking List (as of May 30, 2016)	5	Japan	
IBSA World Ranking List (as of May 30, 2016)	5	South Korea	
IBSA World Ranking List (as of May 30, 2016)	5	Spain	
Invitational	1	Hungary	
Total	8		

=== Half-middleweight (63 kg) ===
Section	Places	NOC	Qualified judoka
Host nation	1	Brazil	
2014 IBSA World Championships	1	Ukraine	
IBSA World Ranking List (as of May 30, 2016)	5		
Invitational	1	Sweden	
Total	8		

=== Middleweight (70 kg) ===
Section	Places	NOC	Qualified judoka
Host nation	1	Brazil	
2014 IBSA World Championships	1	Hungary	
IBSA World Ranking List (as of May 30, 2016)	5	China	
IBSA World Ranking List (as of May 30, 2016)	5	Hungary	
IBSA World Ranking List (as of May 30, 2016)	5	Russia	
IBSA World Ranking List (as of May 30, 2016)	5	Uzbekistan	
IBSA World Ranking List (as of May 30, 2016)	5	Venezuela	
Invitational	1	Croatia	
Total	8		

=== Half-heavyweight (70+ kg) ===
Section	Places	NOC	Qualified judoka
Host nation	1	Brazil	
2014 IBSA World Championships	1	China	
IBSA World Ranking List (as of May 30, 2016)	5	Belarus	
IBSA World Ranking List (as of May 30, 2016)	5	Russia	
IBSA World Ranking List (as of May 30, 2016)	5	Turkey	
IBSA World Ranking List (as of May 30, 2016)	5	United States	
IBSA World Ranking List (as of May 30, 2016)	5	Uzbekistan	
Invitational	1	Thailand	
Total	8		
