= Athletics at the 2020 Summer Paralympics – Men's 400 metres T36 =

Men's 400 metres T36 at the XVI Paralympic Games
- Venue: Tokyo National Stadium
- Dates: 31 August 2021 (final)
- Competitors: 7 from 7 nations
- Winning time: 52.80

Medalists
1st place, gold medalist(s)		James Turner	Australia
2nd place, silver medalist(s)		Evgenii Shvetcov	RPC
3rd place, bronze medalist(s)		William Stedman	New Zealand

The men's 400 metres T36 event at the 2020 Summer Paralympics in Tokyo, took place on 31 August 2021.

The T36 category is for ambulant athletes with cerebral palsy. These athletes do not have the capacity to remain still and they show involuntary movements with all four limbs affected. They usually walk without assistive devices.

== Records ==
Prior to the competition, the existing records were as follows:

World Record	James Turner (AUS)	51.71	Dubai, United Arab Emirates	14 November 2019
Paralympic Record	Evgenii Shvetcov (RUS)	53.31	London, United Kingdom	4 September 2012

Area	Time	Athlete	Nation
Africa	58.03	Sid Ali Bouzourine	Algeria
America	57.09	Juan Moreno Marquez	Colombia
Asia	55.99	Che Mian	China
Europe	53.18	Evgenii Shvetcov	Russia
Oceania	51.71 WR	James Turner	Australia

== Results ==
The final took place on 31 August 2021, at 11:20:

Rank	Lane	Name	Nationality	Time	Notes
1st place, gold medalist(s)	3	James Turner	Australia	52.80	GR
2nd place, silver medalist(s)	6	Evgenii Shvetcov	RPC	53.60	SB
3rd place, bronze medalist(s)	4	William Stedman	New Zealand	54.75	
4	2	Alexis Sebastian Chavez	Argentina	55.14	AR
5	5	Krzysztof Ciuksza	Poland	55.90	SB
6	7	Sid Ali Bouzourine	Algeria	57.91	AR
7	8	Takeru Matsumoto	Japan	59.15	
