= Nicaragua at the Paralympics =

- IPC code: NCA
- NPC: Comité Paralímpico Nicaragüense
- Medals: Gold 0 Silver 0 Bronze 0 Total 0

Summer appearances
- 2004; 2008; 2012; 2016; 2020; 2024

Nicaragua made its Paralympic Games début at the 2004 Summer Paralympics in Athens. Its sole representative, wheelchair athlete Mario Madriz, entered two athletics events. Nicaragua did not take part in the 2008 Summer Games, and has never participated in the Winter Paralympics.

== Full results for Nicaragua at the Paralympics ==
| Name | Games | Sport | Event | Score | Rank |
|---|---|---|---|---|---|
| Mario Madriz | 2004 Athens | Athletics | Men's 100 m T54 | 19.74 | 8th (last) in heat 4; did not advance |
| Mario Madriz | 2004 Athens | Athletics | Men's 5,000 m T54 | dnf | dnf in heat 2; did not advance |

== See also ==
- Nicaragua at the Olympics
