= Athletics at the 2016 Summer Paralympics – Men's 400 metres T36 =

Men's 400 metres T36 at the XV Paralympic Games
- Venue: Estádio Olímpico João Havelange
- Dates: 16 September 2016
- Competitors: 7 from 7 nations

Medalists
1st place, gold medalist(s)		Paul Blake	Great Britain
2nd place, silver medalist(s)		Roman Pavlyk	Ukraine
3rd place, bronze medalist(s)		William Stedman	New Zealand

The T36 category is for ambulant athletes with cerebral palsy. These athletes do not have the capacity to remain still and they show involuntary movements with all four limbs affected. They usually walk without assistive devices.

The Athletics at the 2016 Summer Paralympics – Men's 400 metres T36 event at the 2016 Paralympic Games took place on 16 September 2016, at the Estádio Olímpico João Havelange.

== Final ==
10:15 16 September 2016:

Rank	Lane	Bib	Name	Nationality	Reaction	Time	Notes
1st place, gold medalist(s)	8	1498	Paul Blake	Great Britain		54.49	
2nd place, silver medalist(s)	2	2327	Roman Pavlyk	Ukraine		55.67	
3rd place, bronze medalist(s)	7	1963	William Stedman	New Zealand		55.69	
4	6	2020	Krzysztof Ciuksza	Poland		55.97	
5	3	1235	Mian Che	China		57.26	
6	4	1919	Gabriel de Jesus Cuadra Holmann	Nicaragua		58.50	
7	5	1013	Sid Ali Bouzourine	Algeria		1:00.22	
