= 2016 Summer Paralympics opening ceremony =

- Part of 2016 Summer Paralympics
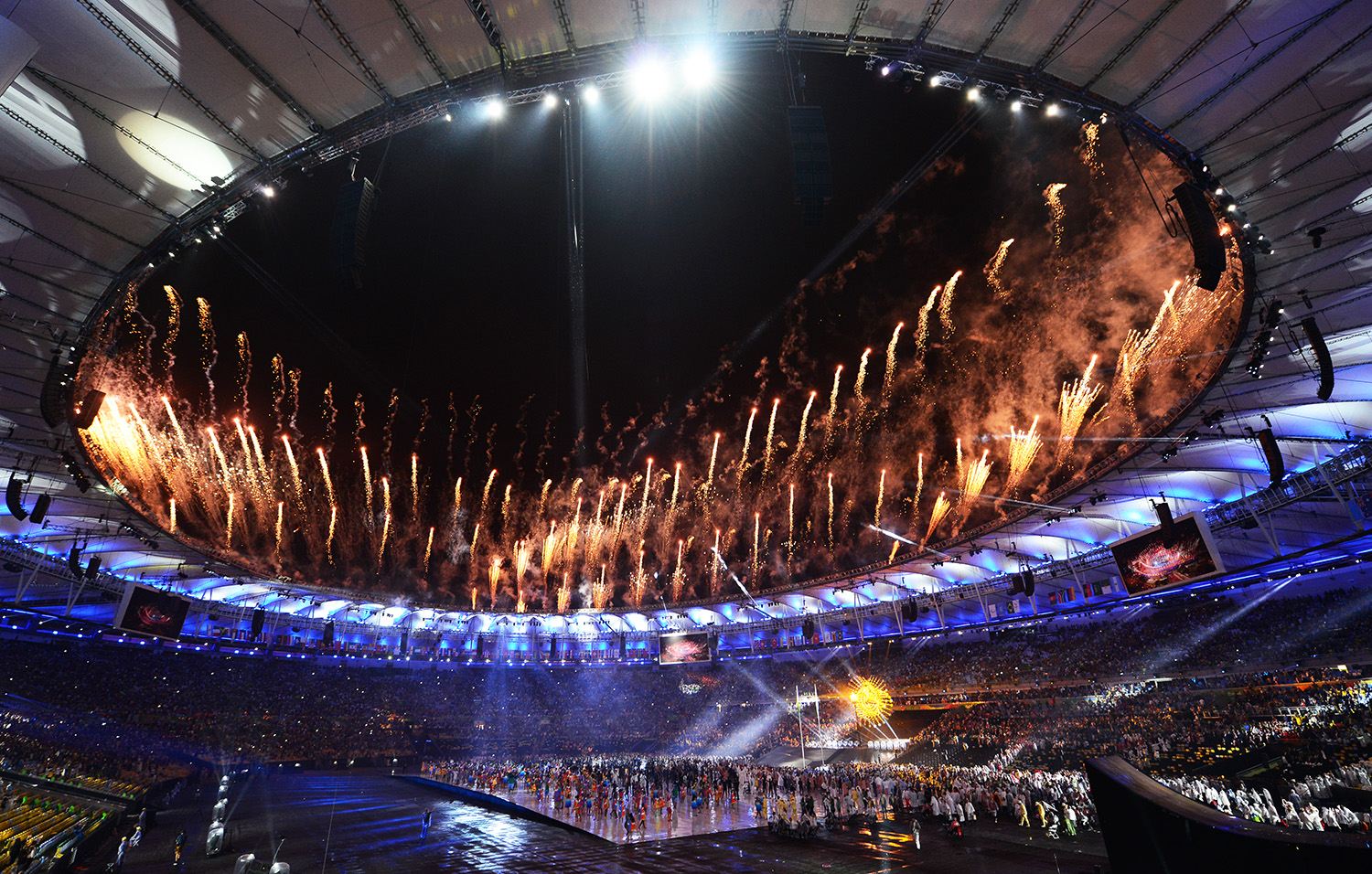
- Date: 7 September 2016
- Time: 18:30 – 22:00 BRT (UTC-3)
- Venue: Maracanã Stadium
- Location: Rio de Janeiro, Brazil; 22°54′44″S 43°13′49″W
- Filmed by: Olympic Broadcasting Services (OBS)
- Footage: The ceremony on the IPC YouTube channel on YouTube

The opening ceremony of the 2016 Summer Paralympics took place on the evening of 7 September 2016 at the Maracanã Stadium, Rio de Janeiro, starting at 18:30 BRT (21:30 UTC).

== Preparations ==
The theme of the ceremony was "Todo Mundo tem um Coração" ("Everybody Has a Heart"); writer and director Marcelo Rubens Paiva stated that the ceremony would focus upon "humanity, on the human condition, on feelings, difficulties, solidarity, love, heart" and "evoke emotion, laughs and tears". At least 2,500 people were involved in the ceremony, consisting of 500 creative professionals and 2,000 volunteers.

On 2 September 2016, director Fred Gelli revealed that the ceremony would feature U.S. Paralympic snowboarder and Dancing with the Stars contestant Amy Purdy performing a contemporary, Samba-inspired dance routine with a "surprise partner". Amidst larger financial concerns surrounding the Games, fellow director Flávio Machado affirmed that the ceremony's budget was fiscally responsible and was "enough to do what we wanted to create", adding that "It wasn't a problem and it's not going to be an excuse".

International Olympic Committee president Thomas Bach was absent from the opening ceremony, as he had prior obligations to attend the state funeral of former West German president Walter Scheel. This marked the first time since 1984 that the current president of the IOC did not attend the opening ceremonies of a Paralympic Games. IOC delegate to disability sports Sam Ramsamy attended the ceremony in place of Bach.

== Synopsis ==
=== Pre-show entertainment ===
Prior to the ceremony, the Rio 2016 mascots Vinicius and Tom were seen participating in a parody of Gisele Bündchen's runway walk segment from the Olympics' opening ceremony, with Vinicius dressed similarly to Bündchen.

=== Prologue ===
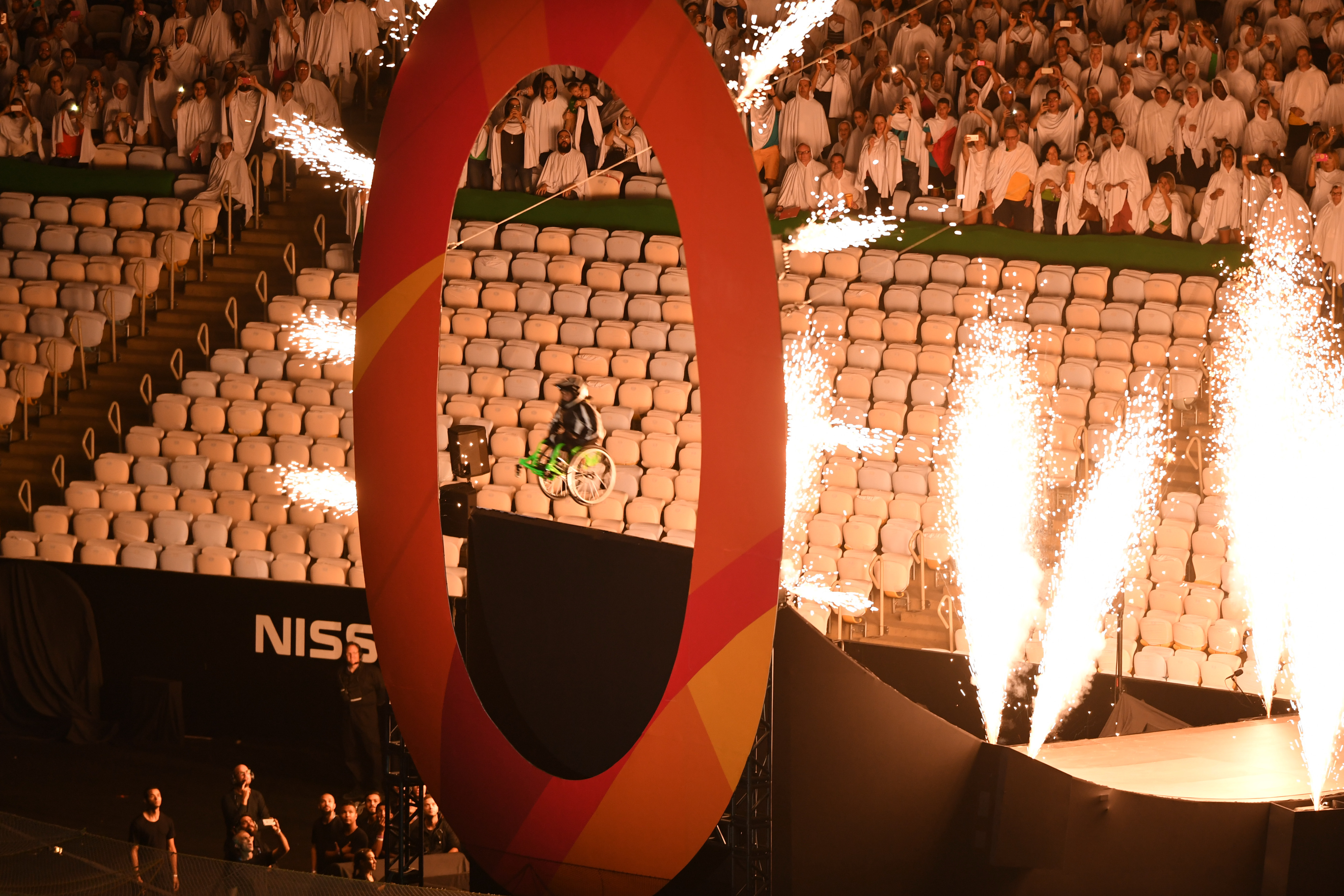
Aaron Fotheringham enters the stadium on a ramp.

The ceremony opened with a pre-recorded segment, featuring Philip Craven, president of the International Paralympic Committee. After his direct flight to Rio was cancelled, Craven instead flies to Belém, travelling on his wheelchair through various Brazilian cities en route to Rio de Janeiro, and visiting the Christ the Redeemer statue before entering the stadium. A countdown from 10 was conducted using numbers unfolded from the upper deck of the stadium. For the conclusion of the countdown, wheelchair stunt performer Aaron "Wheelz" Fotheringham rode down a ramp, jumping through a large numeral "0" and landing a backflip into an air cushion, which is a reference to Canadian snowboarder Johnny Lyall sliding down a ramp and leaping through a set of Olympic rings in the Vancouver 2010 Olympics opening ceremony. The first segment of the cultural portion of the ceremony paid tribute to the invention of the wheel, featuring samba circles and performers riding the stage in wheelchairs.

The next segment paid tribute to Rio's beaches, including performers "surfing" on skateboards on the projection floor. Appearing in the segment was Brazilian Paralympic swimmer Daniel Dias. It was followed by a segment honouring African influence on Brazilian culture. The Hino Nacional Brasileiro was performed on piano by João Carlos Martins, while performers arranged themselves on the stadium floor to form the flag of Brazil.

=== Parade of Nations ===
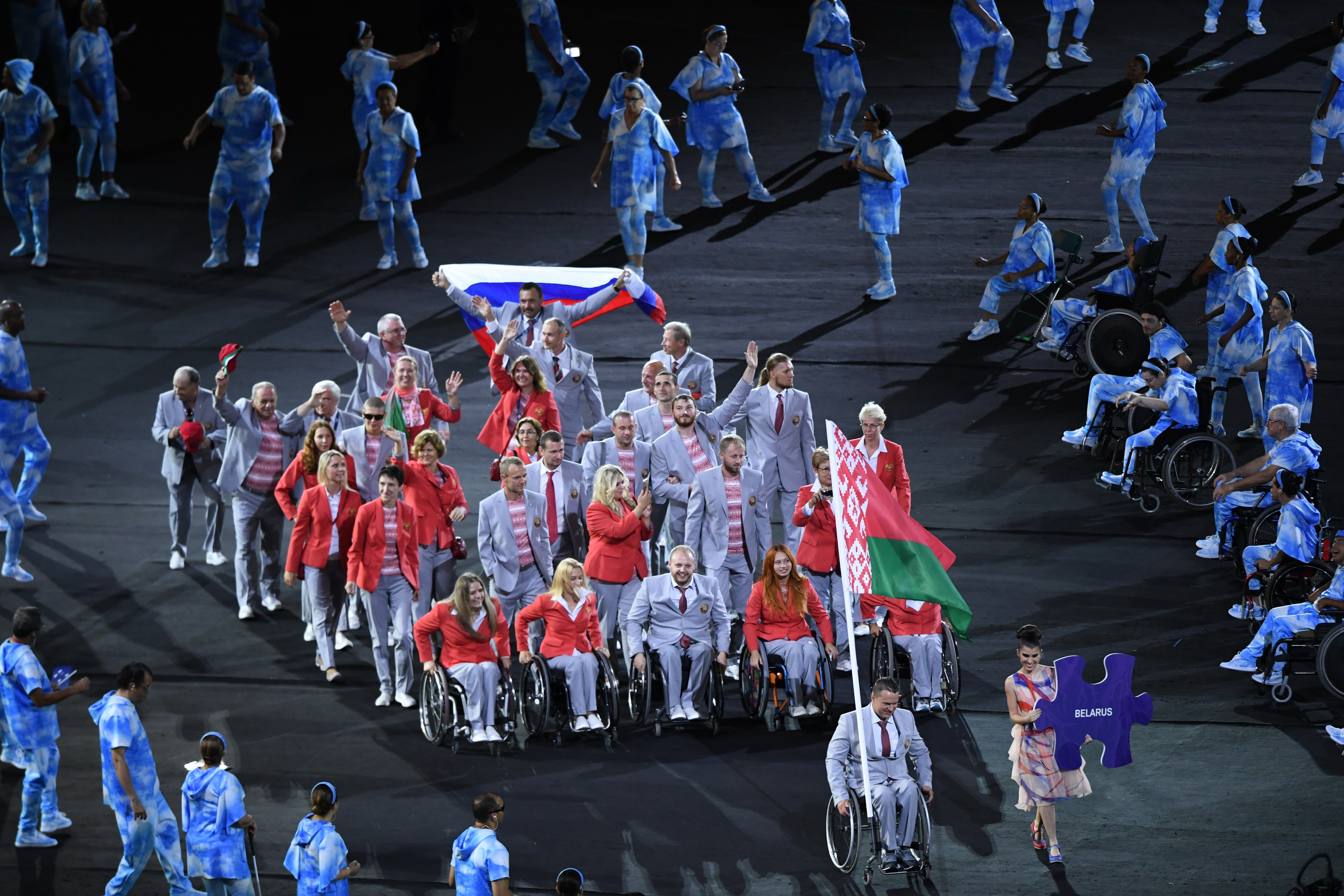
The Belarusian delegation at the Parade of Nations carrying both the Belarusian and Russian flags.

Delegations representing 161 National Paralympic Committees marched into the stadium, led by the Independent athletes. Each team was accompanied by a woman carrying a puzzle piece-shaped sign with the country's name written on in Brazilian Portuguese; the other side of each piece contained photos of the athletes participating in the Games. In protest of the banning of Russia from the Games over a doping scandal, Belarusian Ministry of Sport official Andrey Fomochkin was seen carrying the flag of Russia while entering the stadium; the flag was confiscated, and Fomochkin's credentials were revoked by the IPC for violating the policy forbidding political protests and gestures. As countries entered, the puzzle pieces were assembled on the stadium floor to create a mosaic of the human heart using the photos.

=== Opening ===
The entry of athletes was followed by opening remarks by Rio 2016 Organizing Committee head Carlos Arthur Nuzman, who invited athletes to "play fair, abide by the rules and, most of all, have fun doing what you do best". The crowd booed at Nuzman after he thanked local governments for their contributions to the Games. Nuzman's speech was followed by a speech by IPC president Philip Craven, in which he called upon spectators to "see the true meaning of sport and the true definition of ability", explaining that "in a country which has faced major challenges of late, Paralympians will switch your focus from perceived limitations, to a world full of possibility and endless opportunity. They will surprise you, inspire and excite you, but most of all they will change you." The Games were officially opened by President of Brazil Michel Temer; in the wake of the formal impeachment of Dilma Rousseff, Temer was also booed at.

=== Cultural segments ===
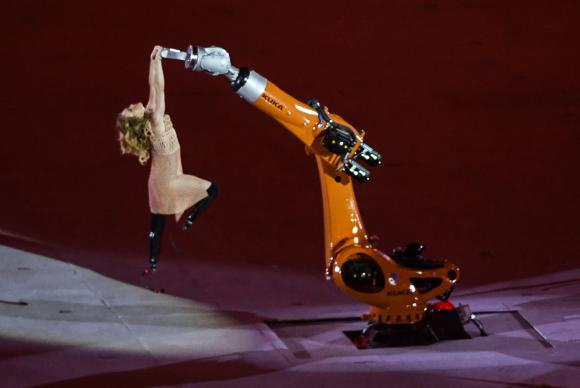
Amy Purdy dances alongside a robotic arm.

A segment called "Beyond Vision" by computation artist and designer Marcelo Coelho, with projections by Muti Randolph, featured dancers dressed in black while carrying white light sticks, followed by a routine by a pair of partially-sighted dancers aided by a tactile floor. This was followed by segments paying tribute to the sports that would be featured during the Games. The Paralympic emblem was formed on the arena floor, followed by the entry and raising of the Paralympic flag; the flag was brought in by members of the Associação de Assistência à Criança Deficiente (an organization for disabled youth), and a montage of Paralympic athletes was played while the flag was raised. Following the taking of oaths, dancer and Paralympic snowboarder Amy Purdy, dressed in a 3D Printed Dress designed by fashion designer Danit Peleg, performed a dance routine with a KUKA robotic arm, which symbolized the co-existence of humans and technology.

=== Lighting of the cauldron ===
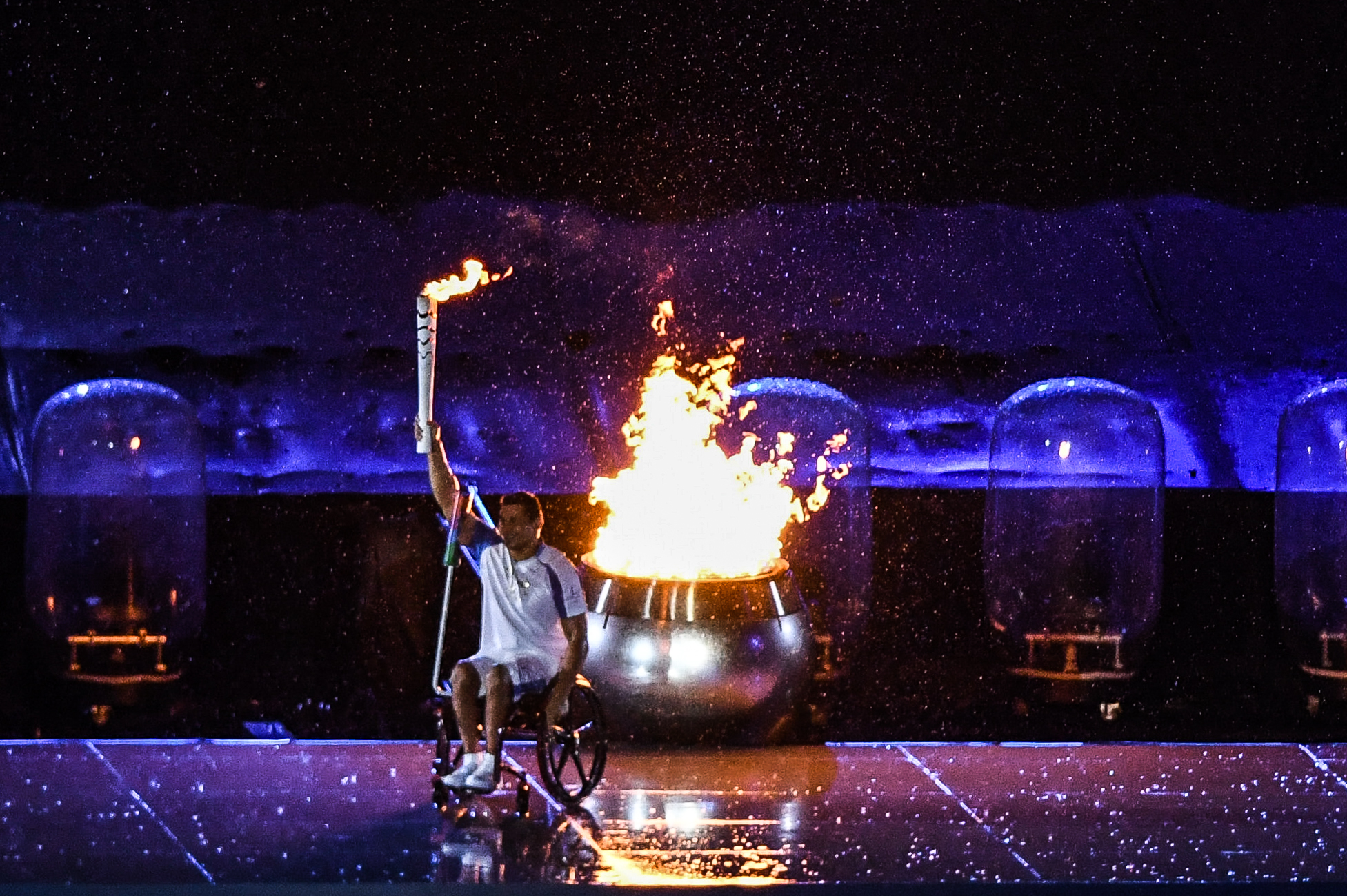
Silva after lighting the Paralympic cauldron

As rain fell over the Maracanã, the Paralympic flame was brought into the stadium by the Brazilian pioneers in the Parasports. Firstly, sprinter Antônio Delfino who has won 2 gold medals in the 2004 Summer Paralympics, passed the torch to Márcia Malsar—the first Brazilian gold medalist at the Paralympics in 1984 Summer Paralympics in New York City. Malsar slipped and fell on the rain-soaked ground, dropping the torch. After successfully recovering from the fall, Malsar passed the torch to Brazilian paralympic legend Ádria Santos, who has won 13 paralympic medals. Santos then passed the flame to the final torchbearer, Brazilian paralympic legend Clodoaldo Silva. The cauldron was located at the top of a flight of stairs, which slid apart to reveal a series of ramps for Silva's wheelchair. Silva ascended the ramps and lit the Paralympic cauldron, which was the same as that of the 2016 Olympics, but adapted in a lower module. The lighting was followed by a musical performance by singer Seu Jorge.

== See also ==
- 2016 Summer Olympics opening ceremony
