= Athletics at the 2024 Summer Paralympics – Men's 400 metres T36 =

Men's 400 metres T36 at the XVII Paralympic Games
- Venue: Stade de France, Paris, France
- Dates: 3 September 2024
- Competitors: 7 from 7 nations
- Winning time: 51.54

Medalists
1st place, gold medalist(s)		James Turner	Australia
2nd place, silver medalist(s)		William Stedman	New Zealand
3rd place, bronze medalist(s)		Alexis Sebastian Chavez	Argentina

400 metres at the 2024 Summer Paralympics
Men · T11 · T12 · T13 · T20 · T36 · T37 · T38 · T47 · T52 · T53 · T54 · T62
Women · T11 · T12 · T13 · T20 · T37 · T38 · T47 · T53 · T54 ·

The Men's 400 metres T36 at the 2024 Summer Paralympics took place on 3 September 2024 at the Stade de France in Paris.

== Records ==
World Record	James Turner (AUS)	51.71	(United Arab Emirates) Dubai	14 November 2019
Paralympic Record	James Turner (AUS)	52.80	(Japan) Tokyo	31 August 2021

Area	Time	Athlete	Location	Date
Africa				
America				
Asia				
Europe				
Oceania				

== Classification ==
The T36 classification is for athletes with athetosis, ataxia, dystonia type impairments affecting all four limbs and the trunk.

== Results ==
=== Final ===
The final was held on 3 September 2024, starting at 12:04 (UTC+2) in the morning session.

Rank	Lane	Athlete	Nation	Time	Notes
1st place, gold medalist(s)	7	James Turner	Australia	51.54	WR
2nd place, silver medalist(s)	5	William Stedman	New Zealand	52.92	PB
3rd place, bronze medalist(s)	6	Alexis Sebastian Chavez	Argentina	53.60	AR
4	4	Takeru Matsumoto	Japan	53.63	AR
5	9	Evgenii Shvetsov	Neutral Paralympic Athletes	53.67	SB
6	8	Fakhr Eddine Thelaidjia	Algeria	53.91	AR
7	3	Izzat Turgunov	Uzbekistan	1:04:31	PB
