= Nicaragua at the 2020 Summer Paralympics =

Nicaragua at the 2021 Summer Paralympics
- IPC code: NCA
- NPC: Nicaraguan Paralympic Committee

in Tokyo
- Competitors: 2 in 2 sports
- Flag bearer: David Pleitez & Norma Salinas
- Medals: Gold 0 Silver 0 Bronze 0 Total 0

Summer Paralympics appearances (overview)
- 2004; 2008; 2012; 2016; 2020; 2024

Nicaragua competed at the 2020 Summer Paralympics in Tokyo, Japan, from 24 August to 5 September 2021.

== Athletics ==
Athlete	Event	Heats		Final	
Athlete	Event	Result	Rank	Result	Rank
David Pleitez	Men's 400m T38	59.35 SB	5	DNA	9
David Pleitez	Men's 1500m T38	N/A		4:54.91 SB	9
Norma Salinas Guide: Santos Treminio	Women's 1500m T11	DNS			

== See also ==
- Nicaragua at the 2020 Summer Olympics
