= Peleg (disambiguation) =

Peleg is a son of the legendary ancestor, Eber, of the Israelites.

Peleg also may refer to:

- Peleg (name), Hebrew given name and surname
- Peleg Peak, mountain in Antarctica
