= Catherine Stedman =

New Zealand pharmacologist and gastroenterologist

- Children: William Stedman

Academic background
- Education: University of Sydney
- Thesis: Role of nuclear receptors in bile acid disposition and detoxification (2006)

Academic work
- Discipline: Pharmacology; gastroenterology
- Institutions: University of Otago
- Website: University of Otago profile

Catherine Ann Malcolm Stedman is a New Zealand pharmacologist and gastroenterologist, and is a clinical professor at the University of Otago, specialising in hepatitis C drug development. She is the first woman gastroenterologist to become a professor of medicine in New Zealand.

== Academic career ==
Stedman completed her undergraduate medical degree at the University of Otago, and then undertook a PhD titled Role of nuclear receptors in bile acid disposition and detoxification at the University of Sydney in 2006. Her clinical training in pharmacology and gastroenterology took place at Christchurch Hospital and Westmead Hospital in Sydney. Stedman then worked in the Salk Institute, and on drug safety for a pharmaceutical company. Stedman returned to Christchurch Hospital as a consultant gastroenterologist and joined the faculty of the University of Otago, rising to clinical associate professor in 2015 and full professor in 2023. She is the first woman gastroenterologist to become a professor of medicine in New Zealand.

Stedman's research focuses on drug development for hepatitis C treatment, although she is also interested in autoimmune liver diseases, and how they affect the lives and life expectancy of people who have them. Stedman has been a principal investigator in a large number of clinical trials aimed at testing antiviral therapies, and led the first successful clinical trial in the world to show that oral antiviral treatment could cure hepatitis C. Stedman has also led trials for antiviral therapies aimed at patients with liver failure resulting from hepatitis C. As a result of these trials, and other potential therapies, the World Health Organization has proposed elimination of hepatitis C.

As of 2024, Stedman is the president of the New Zealand Society of Gastroenterology.

== Honours and awards ==
In 2019 Stedman was awarded the Gold Research Medal by the University of Otago Christchurch campus.

== Selected works ==
- Graham R. Foster; Nezam Afdhal; Stuart K. Roberts; et al. (2015). "Sofosbuvir and Velpatasvir for HCV Genotype 2 and 3 Infection". The New England Journal of Medicine. 373 (27): 2608–2617. doi:10.1056/nejmoa1512612. PMID 26575258. Wikidata Q40907444.
- Susanna Naggie; Curtis Cooper; Saag, Michael; et al. (2015). "Ledipasvir and Sofosbuvir for HCV in Patients Coinfected with HIV-1". The New England Journal of Medicine. 373 (8): 705–713. doi:10.1056/nejmoa1501315. PMC 4892372. PMID 26196665. Wikidata Q36967076.
- Edward J. Gane; Stuart K. Roberts; Catherine A. M. Stedman; et al. (2010). "Oral combination therapy with a nucleoside polymerase inhibitor (RG7128) and danoprevir for chronic hepatitis C genotype 1 infection (INFORM-1): a randomised, double-blind, placebo-controlled, dose-escalation trial". The Lancet. 376 (9751): 1467–1475. doi:10.1016/s0140-6736(10)61384-0. PMID 20951424. Wikidata Q42857015.
- Devin Razavi-Shearer; Ivane Gamkrelidze; Mindie H Nguyen; et al. (2018). "Global prevalence, treatment, and prevention of hepatitis B virus infection in 2016: a modelling study". The lancet. Gastroenterology & hepatology. 3 (6): 383–403. doi:10.1016/s2468-1253(18)30056-6. PMID 29599078. Wikidata Q56830540.
- Stedman, Catherine; Christopher Liddle; Sally A Coulter; Junichiro Sonoda; Jacqueline G A Alvarez; David D Moore; Evans, Ronald Mark; Michael Downes (2005). "Nuclear receptors constitutive androstane receptor and pregnane X receptor ameliorate cholestatic liver injury". Proceedings of the National Academy of Sciences of the United States of America. 102 (6): 2063–2068. Bibcode:2005PNAS..102.2063S. doi:10.1073/pnas.0409794102. PMC 548592. PMID 15684063. Wikidata Q33838275.
- Stedman, Catherine; Christopher Liddle; Sally Coulter; Junichiro Sonoda; Jacqueline G Alvarez; Evans, Ronald Mark; Michael Downes (2006). "Benefit of farnesoid X receptor inhibition in obstructive cholestasis". Proceedings of the National Academy of Sciences of the United States of America. 103 (30): 11323–11328. Bibcode:2006PNAS..10311323S. doi:10.1073/pnas.0604772103. PMC 1544085. PMID 16844773. Wikidata Q34983994.
- Ira M Jacobson; Eric Lawitz; Edward J Gane; et al. (2017). "Efficacy of 8 Weeks of Sofosbuvir, Velpatasvir, and Voxilaprevir in Patients With Chronic HCV Infection: 2 Phase 3 Randomized Trials". Gastroenterology. 153 (1): 113–122. doi:10.1053/j.gastro.2017.03.047. PMID 28390869. Wikidata Q40251971.
- Stedman, Catherine (2002). "Herbal hepatotoxicity". Seminars in Liver Disease. 22 (2): 195–206. doi:10.1055/s-2002-30104. PMID 12016550. Wikidata Q34643156.
