= Nicaragua at the 2004 Summer Paralympics =

- IPC code: NCA
- NPC: Comité Paralímpico Nicaragüense

in Athens
- Competitors: 1 in 1 sport
- Medals: Gold 0 Silver 0 Bronze 0 Total 0

Summer Paralympics appearances (overview)
- 2004; 2008; 2012; 2016; 2020; 2024

Nicaragua competed at the 2004 Summer Paralympics in Athens, Greece. The country's delegation consisted of a single competitor, Mario Madriz. Madriz competed in two track and field athletics events and did not win any medals.

== Athletics ==
Athlete	Event	Heats		Semifinal		Final	
Athlete	Event	Result	Rank	Result	Rank	Result	Rank
Mario Madriz	Men's 100 m T54	19.74	8	did not advance			
Mario Madriz	Men's 5000 m T54	did not finish		did not advance			

== See also ==
- Nicaragua at the 2004 Summer Olympics
