= Andrey Vasilyevich Fomochkin =

Belarusian retired athlete (born 1963)

Andrey Fomochkin
Personal information
- Native name: Андрей Васильевич Фомочкин
- Full name: Andrey Vasilyevich Fomochkin
- Born: May 24, 1963 (age 63) Armavir, Krasnodar Krai, Russian SFSR, Soviet Union

Sport
- Country: Byelorussian SSR
- Sport: Athletics
- Event(s): 4 × 400 m relay, decathlon
Medal record
Spartakiad of Peoples of the USSR
| Gold medal – first place | 1986 Tashkent | 4 x 400 m relay |
| Silver medal – second place | 1986 Tashkent | Decathlon |

Andrey Vasilyevich Fomochkin (Russian: Андрей Васильевич Фомочкин, Belarusian: Андрэй Васілевіч Фомачкін; born May 24, 1963) is a Belarusian retired athlete and sports official. He participated in the 1986 Soviet Spartakiad, winning a gold medal in the 4 × 400 m relay and a silver in the decathlon competitions.

== Early life ==
Andrey Fomochkin was born on May 24, 1963, in Armavir, Krasnodar Krai, Russian SFSR, Soviet Union. At a local sports school, Fomochkin, aged 16, came to prominence when he beat a 24-year-old ""Master of Sport of the USSR" title holder in 110 metres hurdles. As of September 2016, Fomockin remains the event's record holder for the city at 14.4 seconds. Fomochkin's coach, Anatoliy Lobanov, was transferred to Minsk, the capital of the Byelorussian SSR in 1979; Andrey followed him in 1981.

== Sports career ==
Fomochkin is a graduate of Belarusian Institute for National Economy and Belarusian State University of Physical Training.

== Controversy ==
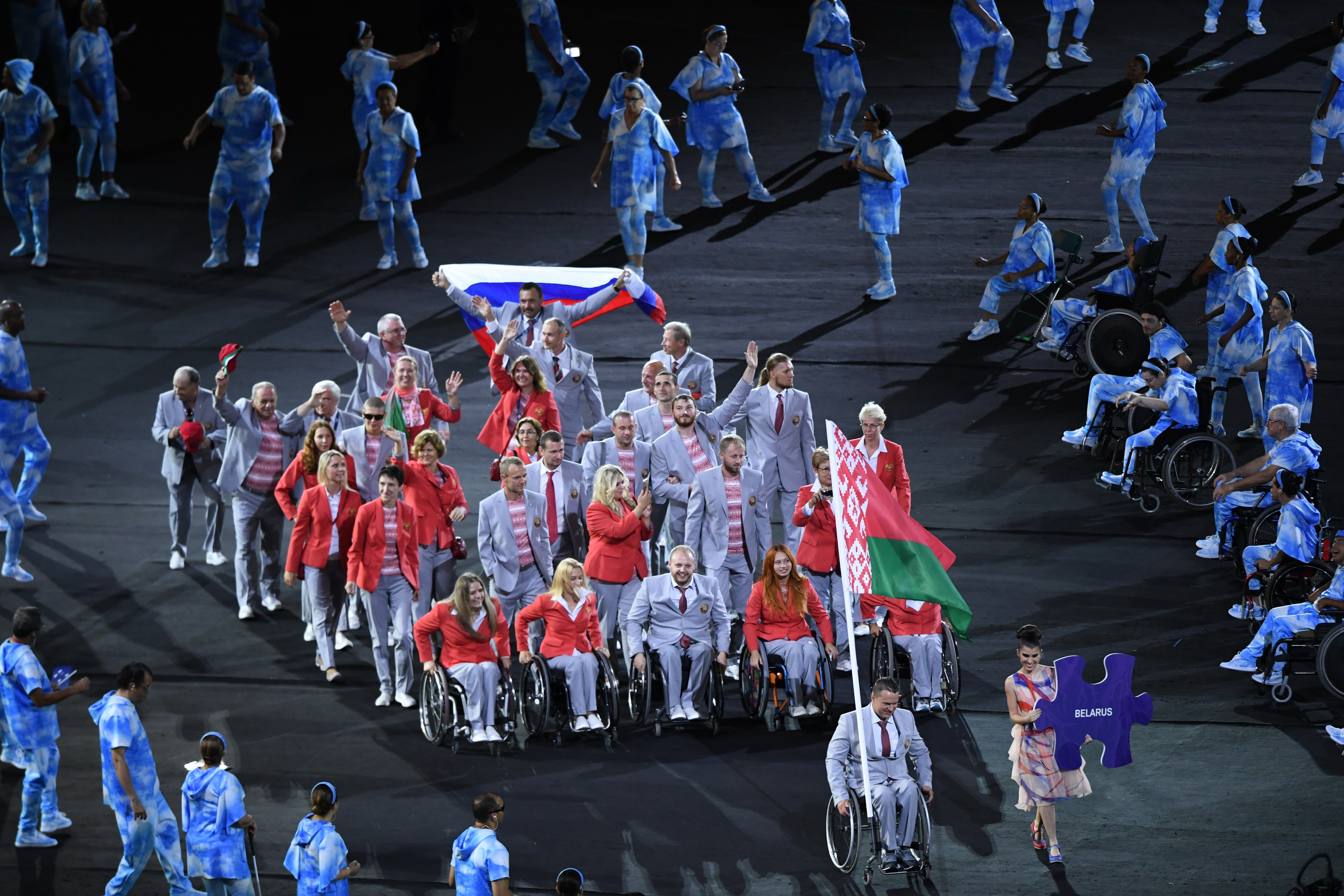
A Belarusian official carried a Russian flag alongside his delegation during the Parade of Nations.

On 7 September 2016, as a member of the country's Ministry of Sport, he protested the ban of the Russian team from the Paralympic Games over the doping scandal during the entry of Belarus at the 2016 Summer Paralympics opening ceremony's parade of nations by holding a Russian flag as a display of solidarity to its neighbour. The Russian flag was quickly confiscated by officials and security, and after he was identified, Fomochkin's accreditation was cancelled by the IPC for violating policies which forbid political protests and gestures.

The IPC also warned that it would closely monitor medal presentations involving Belarusian athletes to ensure they do not display political gestures.

Fomochkin's actions were praised by Belarusians (including President Alexander Lukashenko), as well as Maria Zakharova, a member of Russia's Ministry of Foreign Affairs; she stated to a news agency that Fomochkin had "[shown] solidarity with people who were disgracefully treated in an inhumane way in not being allowed to compete at the Paralympics".
