= Nicaragua at the 2012 Summer Paralympics =

- IPC code: NCA
- NPC: Comité Paralímpico Nicaragüense

in London
- Competitors: 2 in 1 sport
- Medals: Gold 0 Silver 0 Bronze 0 Total 0

Summer Paralympics appearances (overview)
- 2004; 2008; 2012; 2016; 2020; 2024

Nicaragua competed at the 2012 Summer Paralympics in London, United Kingdom from August 29 to September 9, 2012.

== Athletics ==
Men’s Track and Road Events

Athlete	Event	Result	Rank
Gabriel Cuadra Holman	200m T36	33.11	9
Gabriel Cuadra Holman	400m T36	1:02.88	8
Gabriel Cuadra Holman	800m T36	2:23.93	7

Women’s Track and Road Events

Athlete	Event	Heat		Semifinal		Final	
Athlete	Event	Result	Rank	Result	Rank	Result	Rank
Vanessa Benavidez Hernandez	100m T11	16.07	4	—		did not advance	
Vanessa Benavidez Hernandez	200m T11	33.51	4	did not advance			

== See also ==
- Nicaragua at the 2012 Summer Olympics
