= Nicaragua at the 2016 Summer Paralympics =

- IPC code: NCA
- NPC: Comité Paralímpico Nicaragüense

in Rio de Janeiro
- Competitors: 3 in 2 sports
- Flag bearer: Gabriel Cuadra Holmann
- Medals: Gold 0 Silver 0 Bronze 0 Total 0

Summer Paralympics appearances (overview)
- 2004; 2008; 2012; 2016; 2020; 2024

Nicaragua sent a delegation to compete at the 2016 Summer Paralympics in Rio de Janeiro, Brazil, from 7–18 September 2016. This was the Central American country's third appearance at the Summer Paralympic Games, having made its debut twelve years earlier at the 2004 Summer Paralympics. They were represented by three athletes, sprinter Jennifer Osejo, middle-distance runner and sprinter Gabriel Cuadra Holmann and powerlifter Fernando Acevedo, who all qualified for the games by achieving the minimum qualifying standard in international competition. Neither Holmann or Osejo claimed a medal in their respective events and Acevado finished fifth in the men's −72kg powerlifting class.

== Background ==
Nicaragua made its Paralympic debut at the 2004 Summer Paralympics. The nation has appeared in most Paralympic Games since, except for the 2008 Summer Paralympics, making Rio de Janeiro its third appearance at a Summer Paralympiad, but has yet to debut at the Winter Paralympic Games. At the close of the Rio Paralympics, Nicaragua had not medalled at the Paralympic Games. The 2016 Summer Paralympics were held from 7–18 September 2016 with a total of 4,328 athletes representing 159 National Paralympic Committees taking part. Nicaragua sent three athletes to compete in Rio de Janeiro: sprinter Jennifer Osejo, middle-distance runner and sprinter Gabriel Cuadra Holmann and powerlifter Fernando Acevedo. A ceremony was held on behalf of the team with the athletes on 28 July 2016, and the delegation travelled to Brazil on 5 September. Holmann was chosen to be the flag bearer for the parade of nations during the opening ceremony.

== Disability classification ==
Every participant at the Paralympics has their disability grouped into one of five disability categories; amputation, the condition may be congenital or sustained through injury or illness; cerebral palsy; wheelchair athletes, there is often overlap between this and other categories; visual impairment, including blindness; Les autres, any physical disability that does not fall strictly under one of the other categories, for example dwarfism or multiple sclerosis. Each Paralympic sport then has its own classifications, dependent upon the specific physical demands of competition. Events are given a code, made of numbers and letters, describing the type of event and classification of the athletes competing. Some sports, such as athletics, divide athletes by both the category and severity of their disabilities, other sports, for example swimming, group competitors from different categories together, the only separation being based on the severity of the disability.

== Athletics ==
Gabriel Caudra Holmann was 23 years old at the time of the Rio Summer Paralympics. He was making his second appearance in the quadrennial multi-sport competition, having represented Nicaragua at the 2012 Summer Paralympics. Holmann was born with cerebral palsy due to him having a respiratory arrest that starved him of oxygen after a medical error from a gynecologist while his mother was in labour on 12 November 1992. He qualified for the Rio de Janeiro Paralympics by winning two bronze medals at the 2015 Parapan American Games. On 10 September, Holmann competed in the men's 100 metres T36 final. He completed the race in a new personal best time of 12.91 seconds, which put him sixth out of seven finishing sprinters. (Note: One athlete, Roman Pavlyk, was disqualified.) Holmann participated in the final of the men's 400 metres T36 six days later. With a time of 58.50 seconds, he improved his personal best for the second successive Paralympic event to place sixth out of seven competitors. On 17 September, Holmann took part in the final of the men's 800 metres T36. He came fifth out of six athletes improving his own personal best Central American record to 2 minutes and 16.21 seconds.

At the age of 19, Jennifer Osejo was the youngest athlete to represent Nicaragua at the Rio Paralympic Games. She was making her debut at the Summer Paralympic Games, having participated in the Central American Games for Students with Disabilities and the Parapan American Games. Osejo's condition is congenital; like Holmann, she was born with cerebral palsy and is classified T37 by the International Paralympic Committee. She qualified for the Rio Paralympics at a sprinting event that was held as part of the 2016 Ecuador Para Athletics International Open. On 8 September, Osejo took part in the semi-final heats of the women's 100 metres T37. Assigned to heat one, she completed the event in a time of 18.18 seconds, which was a new personal best, and put her sixth and last out of all athletes in her heat. Overall, Osjeco finished eleventh and last out of all competitors, and she did not advance to the final because her effort was 1.85 seconds behind the slowest athlete who progressed to the next stage.

Men's Track

Athlete	Events	Final	
Athlete	Events	Time	Rank
Gabriel Cuadra Holmann	100 m T36	12.91	6 PB
Gabriel Cuadra Holmann	400 m T36	58.50	6 PB
Gabriel Cuadra Holmann	800 m T36	2:16.21	5 PB

Women's Track

Athlete	Events	Heat		Final	
Athlete	Events	Time	Rank	Time	Rank
Jennifer Osejo	100 m T37	18.18	6	did not advance	

== Powerlifting ==
Fernando Acevedo was the oldest person to compete for Nicaragua at the Rio Paralympic Games at the age of 37. This was the first time he compete in the Paralympic movement. Acevedo has been afflicted with polio since he was eight years old but he has avoided the use of a wheelchair and uses a cane to help him walk. He qualified for the Paralympics because he won a bronze medal in the men's −72 kg powerlifting class at the 2015 Parapan American Games. This enabled Nicagarua to make its Paralympic debut in a sport that was not para-athletics. On 11 September, Acevedo competed in the men's −72kg powerlifting category. He failed to lift 140 kg (310 lb) on his first and second attempts but he was successful at his third try and he placed fifth.

Athlete	Event	Result	Rank
Fernando Acevedo	Men's −72 kg	140 kg (310 lb)	5

== See also ==
- Nicaragua at the 2016 Summer Olympics
- Nicaragua at the Paralympics
