= 2017 World Para Athletics Championships – Men's 800 metres =

The men's 800 metres at the 2017 World Para Athletics Championships was held at the Olympic Stadium in London from 14 to 23 July. The results of the men's 800 m T54 race on Monday 17 July were nullified and the race rescheduled to Friday 21 July after three competitors crashed at the 600-metre mark. Marcel Hug won the original race. The race took place on Friday evening without Richard Chiassaro who had been disqualified.

== Medalists ==
Event	Gold		Silver		Bronze	
T13	Fouad Baka; Algeria	1:51.60 CR	Abdellatif Baka; Algeria	1:51.69	Mohamed Amguoun; Morocco	1:51.84 PB
T20	Michael Brannigan; United States	1:54.24 SB	Deliber Rodríguez Ramírez; Spain	1:55.23 PB	Sylwester Jaciuk; Poland	1:56.92 PB
T34	Walid Ktila; Tunisia	1:44.79 CR	Mohamed Hammadi; United Arab Emirates	1:45.28	Isaac Towers; Great Britain	1:46.46
T36	James Turner; Australia	2:08.78	William Stedman; New Zealand	2:11.86	Keegan Pitcher; New Zealand	2:13.49
T38	Michael McKillop; Ireland	2:00.92 SB	Deon Kenzie; Australia	2:02.15 AR	Abbes Saidi; Tunisia	2:02.38 SB
T53	Brent Lakatos; Canada	1:40.14	Pierre Fairbank; France	1:41.97	Pongsakorn Paeyo; Thailand	1:42.07
T54	Marcel Hug; Switzerland	1:38.40	Liu Yang; China	1:38.69	Yassine Gharbi; Tunisia	1.38.82
WR world record | AR area record | CR championship record | GR games record | NR national record | OR Olympic record | PB personal best | SB season best | WL world leading (in a given season)

Events listed in pink were contested but no medals were awarded.

== See also ==
- List of IPC world records in athletics
