= Christchurch Hospital =

Hospital in Christchurch, New Zealand

- Canterbury District Health Board
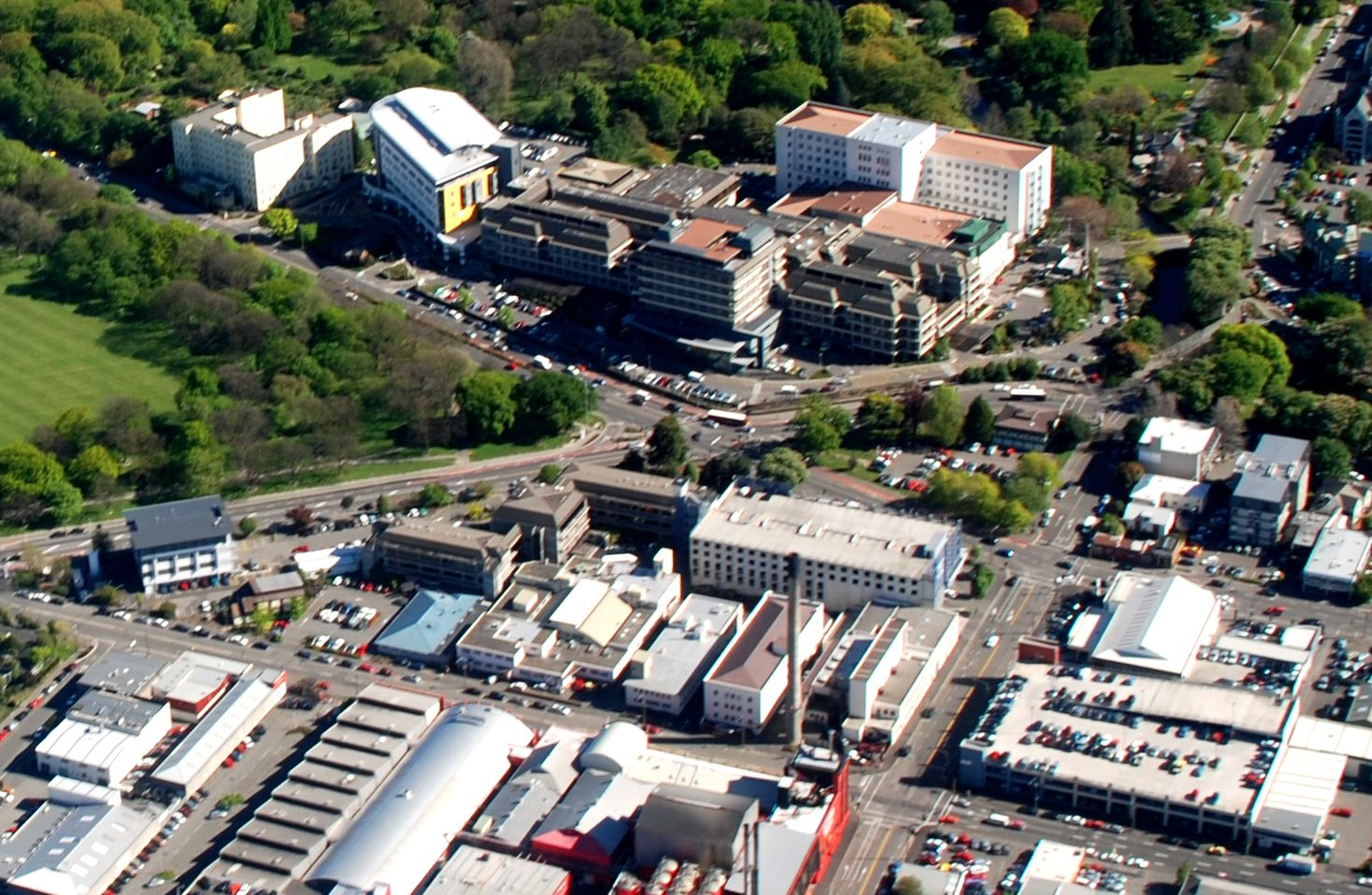
- Aerial view of Christchurch Hospital (2009)

- Location in Christchurch

Geography
- Location: Riccarton Avenue, Christchurch, New Zealand
- Coordinates: 43.5344°S 172.6255°E

Organisation
- Type: General
- Affiliated university: University of Otago Christchurch School of Medicine

Services
- Emergency department: Yes
- Beds: 836

Helipads
- Helipad: ICAO: NZJC

History
- Founded: 1 June 1862

Links
- Website: www.cdhb.health.nz
- Lists: Hospitals in New Zealand

Christchurch Hospital is the largest tertiary hospital in the South Island of New Zealand. The public hospital is in the centre of Christchurch city, on the edge of Hagley Park, and serves the wider Canterbury region. The Canterbury District Health Board (CDHB) operates the hospital with funding from the government.

Christchurch Hospital is the major trauma centre for northern and central Canterbury, and the tertiary major trauma centre for the wider Canterbury and West Coast regions. It has the busiest ED in the South Island and sees more major trauma than any other hospital in New Zealand, and all but a handful of hospitals in Australia.

The Christchurch School of Medicine is on the hospital campus, the school provides teaching for fourth, fifth and sixth year medical students, and is part of the University of Otago.

A new building, sitting behind the original Christchurch Hospital buildings, named ‘Waipapa’ was opened in 2020 and houses Canterbury DHB’s acute services. Christchurch Hospital’s Emergency Department is now located within Waipapa.

The hospital’s helipad now sits atop of the Waipapa building, and replaces the previous one situated in Hagley Park 500 m (1,600 ft) to the southwest along Hagley Avenue.

== History ==
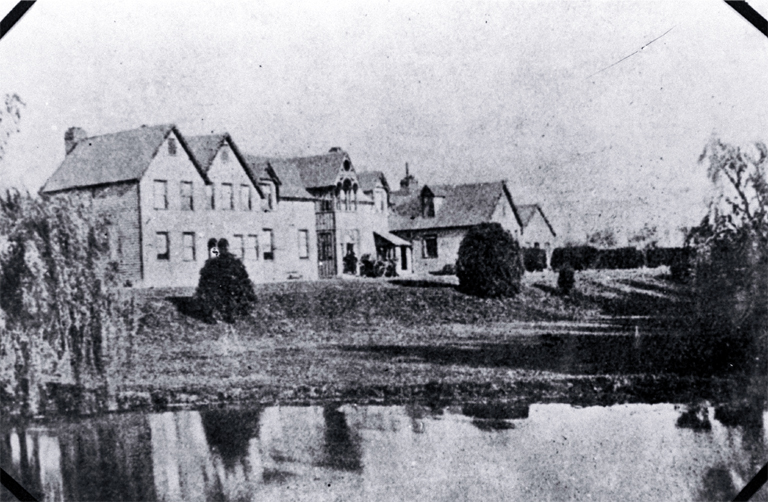
Christchurch Hospital pictured in 1872.

The Provincial Government voted £1,500 to building the hospital in Christchurch in 1861. The initial building was a two-storied "barn-like structure" on Hagley Park at Riccarton Avenue. It opened on 1 June 1862, after "Hands off Hagley" protests by citizens. The last of the original buildings were demolished in 1917.

In 2009, the CDHB announced a NZ$400 million proposal to replace some of the hospital buildings, including a new 450-bed hospital, a rooftop helipad and additional operating theatres. The construction was due to start in 2011, and be expected to take three years.

Following the earthquakes, construction plans were scrapped and over the next five years, the Burwood Health Campus and the Christchurch Hospital underwent a $650 million redevelopment. This is the biggest ever investment in public health facilities in New Zealand. At Christchurch Hospital, the new Acute Services Building, now named Waipapa, has:

- 62,000m2 total area
- 13 lifts in the building
- Built with steel framing (6,000 tonnes of structural steel and over 100,000 bolts) with a curtain wall made up of 1,300 panels
- Lots of natural light
- Significant seismic protection in the building – apart from the base isolators there is a large amount of seismic bracing, gaps in the stairs to allow movement and special joints in the pipes that run services such as hot water, steam and air conditioning
- Tower A (Level 3 – 9) – General Surgery wards, Vascular, Stroke, Children’s medical, Children’s Haematology and Oncology Centre (CHOC) and the helipad
- Tower B (Level 3 – 8) – Neurology and Neuro Surgery, Children’s Surgery, Bone Marrow Transplant Unit and Adolescent and Young Adult Cancer support, Oncology, Orthopedics and General Surgery
- Level 2 – Sterile Services and administration areas
- Level 1 – Intensive Care, Theatres and Radiology
- Ground Floor – Emergency Department, Medical Assessment, Acute Care and Radiology
- The Lower Ground Floor has meeting rooms, shared work spaces and changing rooms for staff.

The hospital played a key role in treating casualties of the February 2011 Christchurch earthquake, admitting 164 people with serious injuries. The quake also caused the evacuation of one ward.

The hospital also played a key role in the immediate aftermath of the Christchurch mosque shootings, admitting 49 people with injuries from the shooting, two of whom later died in the hospital.

== Notable people ==
- Courtney Nedwill (1837–1920), public health officer with a 30-year connection to the hospital
- Catherine Stedman, professor of medicine

== See also ==
- List of hospitals in New Zealand
- Nurses' Memorial Chapel
- Princess Margaret Hospital, Christchurch
