= Nicaragua at the 2024 Summer Paralympics =

- IPC code: NIC
- NPC: Nicaraguan Paralympic Committee

in Paris, France August 28, 2024 – September 8, 2024
- Competitors: 1 in 1 sport
- Flag bearer: Carlos Alberto Castillo
- Medals: Gold 0 Silver 0 Bronze 0 Total 0

Summer Paralympics appearances (overview)
- 2004; 2008; 2012; 2016; 2020; 2024

Nicaragua competed at the 2024 Summer Paralympics in Paris, France, from 28 August to 8 September 2024. This was the nation's fifth time competing at the Summer Paralympic Games after it made its debut at the 2004 Summer Paralympics. The delegation consisted of only one competitor from one sport.

== Competitors ==
The following is the list of number of competitors in the Games.

Sport	Men	Women	Total
Athletics	1	0	1
Total	1	0	1

== Athletics ==
Athlete	Event	Heat		Final	
Athlete	Event	Result	Rank	Result	Rank
Carlos Alberto Castillo	Men's 400 metres T38	—		59.28	8

== See also ==
- Nicaragua at the 2024 Summer Olympics
- Nicaragua at the Paralympics
