= Paul Blake (athlete) =

British Paralympic athlete (born 1990)

Paul Blake MBE
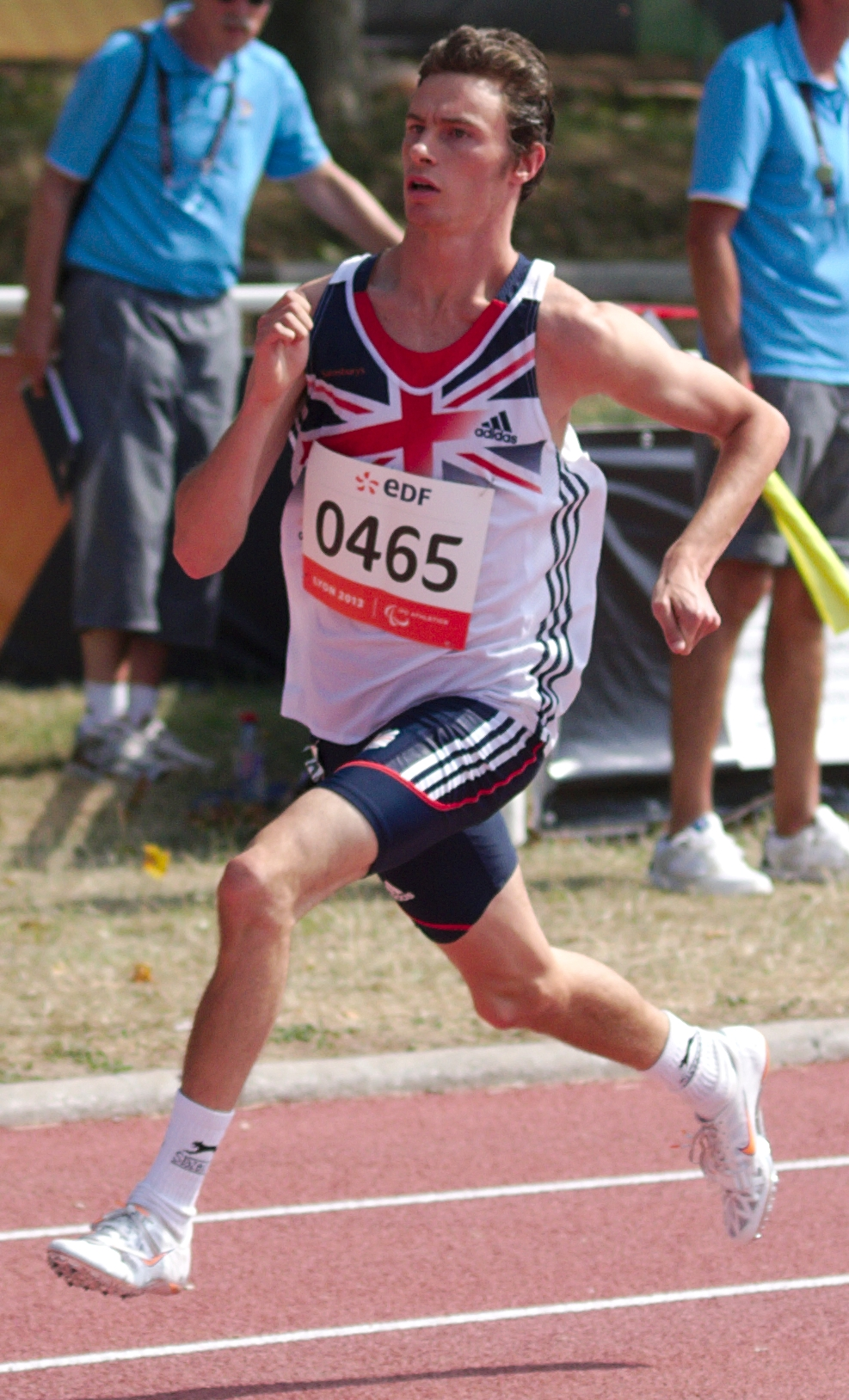
- Blake during the 2013 World Championships

Personal information
- Nationality: British
- Born: Paul John Blake; 15 January 1990 (age 36) Dorchester, Dorset, England

Sport
- Country: United Kingdom; England
- Sport: T36 athletics
- Events: 400m, 800m and 1500m
- Club: Dorchester Athletic Club
- Coached by: Rob Ellchuk
Medal record
Event	1st	2nd	3rd
Paralympic Games	1	1	1
World Championships	4	4	0
European Championships	0	2	2
Athletics
Paralympic Games
Gold medal – first place	2016 Rio de Janeiro	400m T36
Silver medal – second place	2016 Rio	800m T36
Silver medal – second place	2012 London	400m T36
Bronze medal – third place	2012 London	800m T36
IPC World Championships
Gold medal – first place	2011 Christchurch	400m – T36
Gold medal – first place	2013 Lyon	800m – T36
Gold medal – first place	2015 Doha	800m – T36
Silver medal – second place	2011 Christchurch	800m – T36
Silver medal – second place	2011 Christchurch	1500m – T36
Silver medal – second place	2013 Lyon	400m – T36
Silver medal – second place	2015 Doha	400m – T36
IPC European Championships
Silver medal – second place	2012 Stadskanaal	400m – T36
Silver medal – second place	2014 Swansea	400m - T36
Bronze medal – third place	2012 Stadskanaal	800m – T36
Bronze medal – third place	2014 Swansea	100m - T36
- Updated on 31 December 2016

Paul John Blake (born 15 January 1990) is a British athlete who competes in T36 middle-distance events. Blake competed at the 2012 Summer Paralympics where he won a silver and bronze medal in the 400m T36 and 800m T36 respectively. He followed this up with two gold medals at the 2013 and 2015 World Championships, both in his favoured 800m event.

== Personal history ==
Born in Dorchester, Dorset, Blake developed cerebral palsy after being deprived of blood in the womb. Blake's father, also called Paul, is an actor, best known for playing the bounty hunter Greedo in Star Wars (1977), while his mother Kate is a former ballet dancer with the Royal Ballet.

== Career history ==
Blake competed for Great Britain at the 2011 IPC Athletics World Championships where he won a Gold in 400m and silver in 800m and 1500m. And at the 2012 IPC Athletics European Championships he won two medals (a silver and Bronze) and has been selected for the British team at the 2012 Summer Paralympics doing the 400m and 800m in T36. He also has the World Record in the T36 800m (2:08.02) and 1500m (4:34.42). At the London 2012 Paralympic Games, Blake won silver in the 400m T36, in a personal best time of 54.22, and bronze in the 800m T36.

In 2013, Blake represented Great Britain at the IPC Athletics World Championships in Lyon. There he took part in the 400m and 80m T36 events. In the 400m he finished second behind Russia's Evgenii Shvetcov, but then secured his first major international gold with a win in the 800m.

At the 2014 IPC Athletics European Championships, Blake enjoyed a medal winning championships. He started it off with a bronze medal in the T36 100m behind his teammate, Graeme Ballard. Blake had only started competing over the 100m competitively in 2014 and won a medal in Swansea after his victory over the distance at the Sainsbury's Anniversary Games prior to the championships. Blake followed his 100m success with a silver medal in the 400m in south Wales.

At the 2015 IPC Athletics World Championships held in Doha, Blake was given the role of co-captain for the Great Britain team along with sprinter Laura Sugar. He successfully defended his 800m World title with a win over Russian rival Artyom Arefyev. Blake added a silver in the 400m, equaling his achievements from 2013 in Lyon.

Blake completed his set of medals with a gold at the 2016 Rio Paralympics, triumphing in the men's 400m T36. He also took silver in the men's 800m T36.

Blake was appointed Member of the Order of the British Empire (MBE) in the 2017 New Year Honours for services to athletics.

Blake won Gold for 800m at the 2019 Athletics World Championships held in Dubai.
