= James Turner (parathlete) =

Australian Paralympic athlete (born 1996)

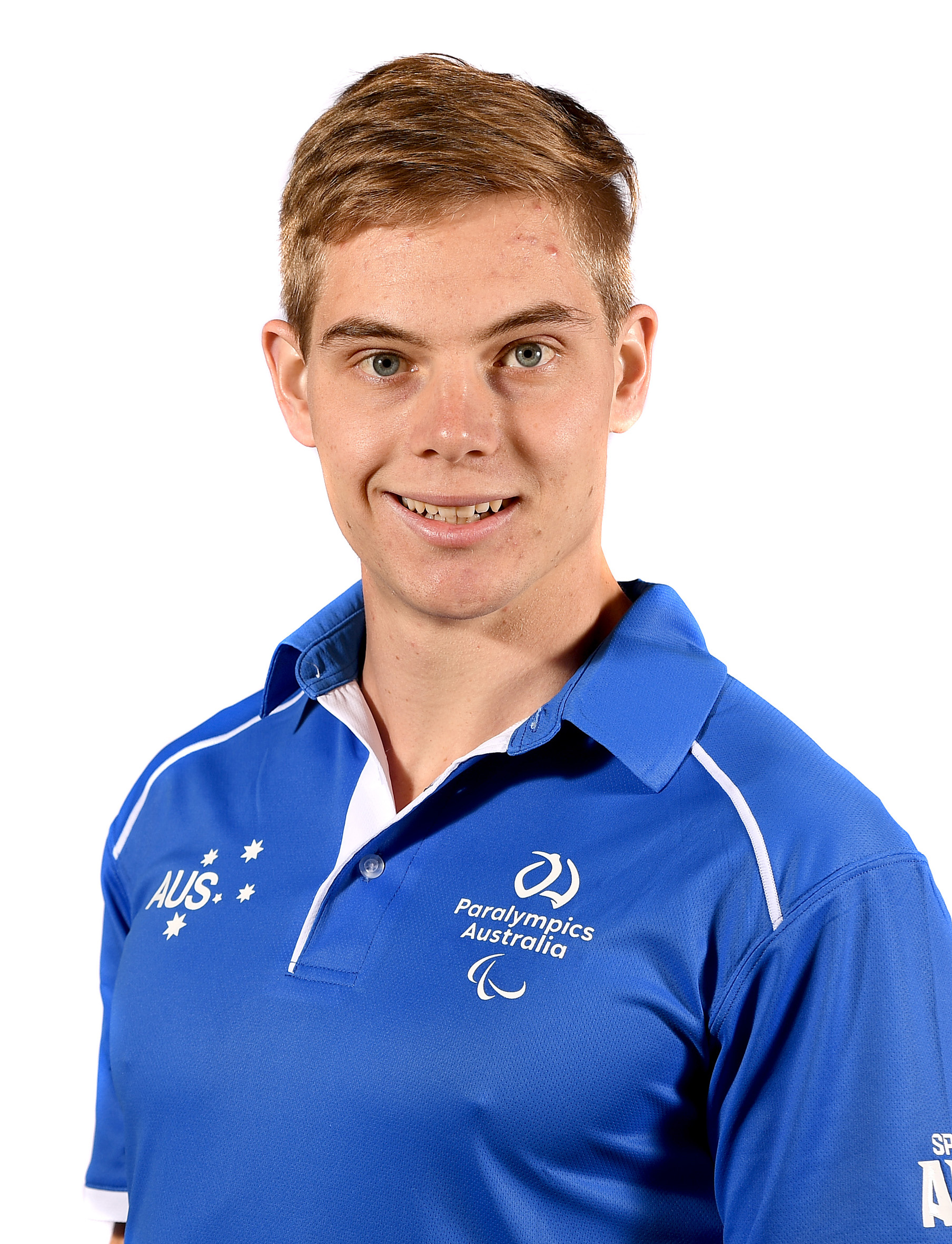
- James Turner

Personal information
- Full name: James Michael Apsley Turner
- Nationality: Australian
- Born: 22 May 1996 (age 30) Penrith, New South Wales

Sport
- Disability class: T36
- Event(s): 100m, 400m (Previously 800m, 200m)
- Coached by: Iryna Dvoskina
Medal record
Track and field (athletics) T36
Paralympic Games
Gold medal – first place	2016 Rio de Janeiro	800 m T36
Gold medal – first place	2020 Tokyo	400 m T36
Gold medal – first place	2024 Paris	100 m T36
Gold medal – first place	2024 Paris	400 m T36
Silver medal – second place	2020 Tokyo	100 m T36
World Championships
Gold medal – first place	2017 London	200 m T36
Gold medal – first place	2017 London	400 m T36
Gold medal – first place	2017 London	800 m T36
Gold medal – first place	2019 Dubai	100 m T36
Gold medal – first place	2019 Dubai	400 m T36
Gold medal – first place	2023 Paris	100 m T36
Gold medal – first place	2023 Paris	400 m T36
Gold medal – first place	2025 New Delhi	400 m T36
Silver medal – second place	2024 Kobe	400 m T36

James Michael Apsley Turner, OAM (born 22 May 1996) is an Australian Paralympic athlete and soccer player with cerebral palsy. He has represented Australia as part of the Australia Paralympic soccer team, the ParaRoos, and was its player of the year in 2013. At the 2016 Rio Paralympics, he won the Men's 800m T36 in a world record time of 2:02.39. He won a gold and silver medal at the 2020 Tokyo Paralympics . At the 2024 Paris Paralympics, he won two gold medals including a world record in the 400m T36.

At the World Para Athletics Championships from 2017 to 2023, he has won 7 gold medals.

== Personal ==
James Turner was born on 22 May 1996 in Penrith, New South Wales. He has cerebral palsy. He grew up in Diamond Beach, New South Wales. In 2015, he commenced a Bachelor of Mechanical Engineering at the University of Wollongong. He has since moved to Canberra and commenced a Bachelor of Sports and Exercise Science at the University of Canberra.

== Football ==
Turner played 7-a-side soccer as a midfielder for New South Wales starting in 2009, and for the Australian national 7-a-side team, the Pararoos, in 2012. By November 2013, he had 16 caps, and was named Paralympic Football Player of the Year at the 2013 FFA Australian Football Awards night on 13 November 2013. The head coach of the Pararoos, Paul Brown, said that "James has pace to burn and he gets forward on the overlap to worry defenders in their third. He has the potential to be one of the best players that Australia has ever produced if he stays on the path that he is at present".

Unfortunately for the Pararoos, ranked tenth in the world, in July 2014 the Australian Sports Commission cut funding for the 7-a-side soccer program on the grounds that the team was unlikely to make the 2016 Summer Paralympics. After a public outcry, the team was revived with a new funding model in 2015. Despite the fundraising efforts, the Pararoos failed to qualify for Rio.

== Athletics ==
Turner started with Forster-Tuncurry Athletics club as an eight-year-old and at the age of 15 joined the Hunter Academy of Sport AWD middle-distance running program. In 2015, Turner turned his talents to back athletics on the encouragement of Athletics Australia, where he is classified as a T36 athlete. He was coached first by Marie Kay and from 2016 by Brett Robinson in Wollongong, New South Wales.

At the Australian Athletics Championships in March 2016, he ran the 800m in 2:08.90, which was a Paralympic qualifier. In the IPC Grand Prix in Canberra February, he had posted an even faster time of 2.08.8. In August 2016, it was announced that had been selected to represent Australia at the 2016 Summer Paralympics in Rio de Janeiro in the 800m event. He was ranked number two in the world in this event in his classification.

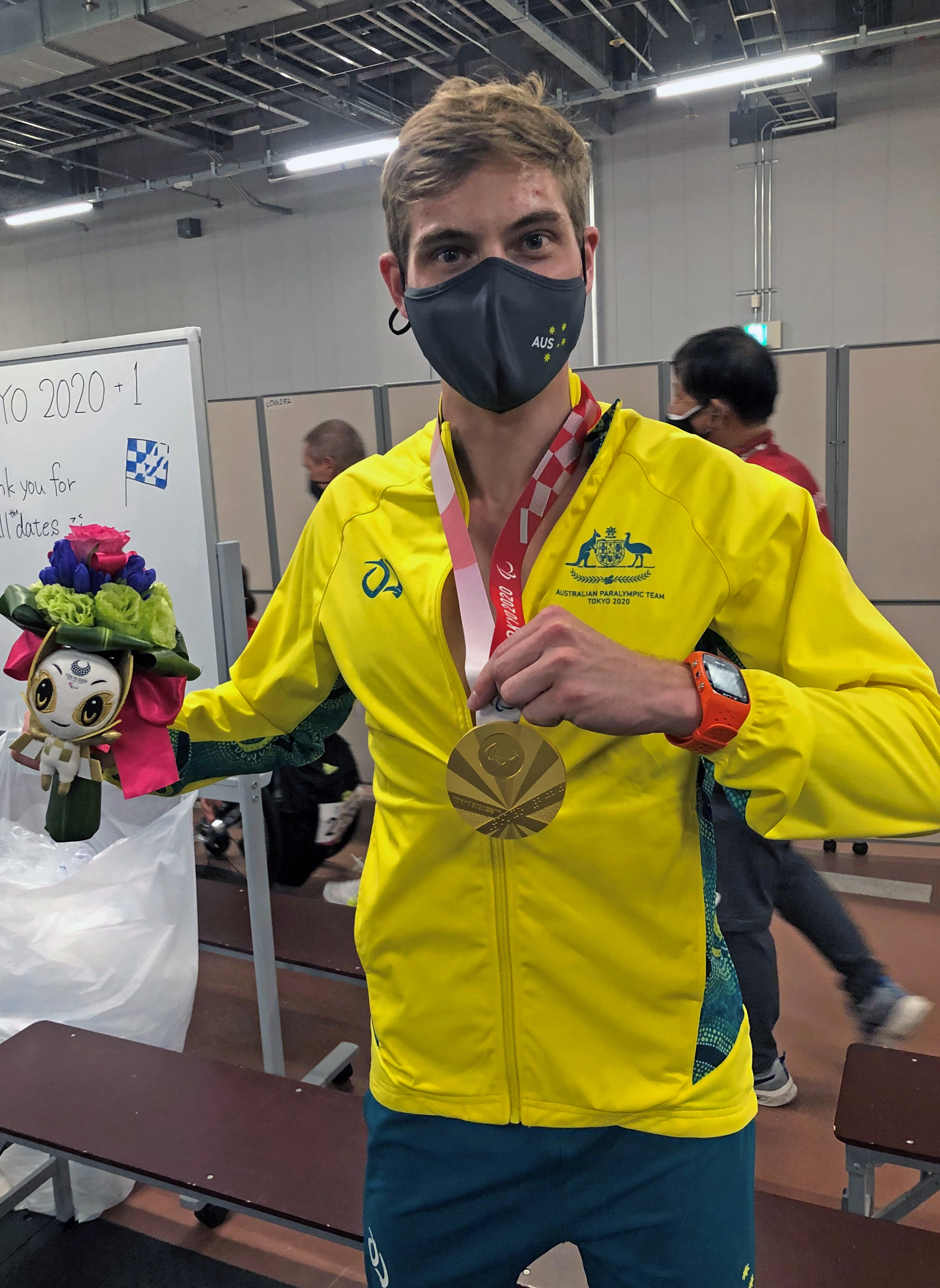
James Turner with the gold medal he won at the Tokyo 2020 Paralympics in the men's T36 400m.

At the 2016 Summer Paralympics, Turner won the Men's 800m T36 in a world record time of 2:02.39. In December 2016, he was named Australian Paralympic Rookie of the Year.

At the 2017 World Para Athletics Championships in London, Turner won three gold medals – Men's 200m T36 (world record time 24.09 (−0.4)), Men's 400m T36 and Men's 800m T36. After the London 2017 World Para-Athletics Championships, Turner moved to Canberra to be coached by Iryna Dvoskina at the Australian Institute Of Sport.

Turner's Rio Paralympics gold medal event, the 800m, is not on the 2020 Tokyo Paralympics program. As a result, he has changed to short distances – currently the 100m and 400m.

At the 2019 World Para Athletics Championships in Dubai, Turner ran 11.72 and broke the world record in winning the Men's 100m T36 and followed up with gold in the Men's 400m T36 in a world record time of 51.71.

Turner competed at the 2020 Summer Paralympics in Tokyo. He won gold in the Men's 400 metres T36, setting a new games record with a time of 52.80. He also won silver in the Men's 100 m T36 having qualified first in his heat.

At the 2023 World Para Athletics Championships in Paris, Turner won gold medals in the Men's 100m and 400m T36 events. In the lead up the 2024 Paralympics, he won the silver medal in the Men's 400m T36 at the 2024 World Para Athletics Championships, in Kobe, Japan.

At the 2024 Paris Paralympics, he won two gold medal in T36 events - 100m in 11.85 (Paralympic record) and 400m in 51.54 (World record). He was named para sport athlete of the year in the 2024 Canberra sports awards.

== Recognition ==
- 2016 – Athletics Australia - Male Para-athlete of the Year.
- 2017 – Medal of the Order of Australia in 2017.
- 2017 – Athletics Australia - Male Para-athlete of the Year.
- 2019 – Athletics Australia - Male Para-athlete of the Year.
- 2021 - CBR Sports Awards - Athlete of the Year - Para Sport
- 2023 - AIS Sport Performance Awards - Male Para-Athlete of the Year; Athletics Australia - Russell Short Award for Male Para Athlete of the Year
- 2024 - Flag bearer with Lauren Parker at the Closing Ceremony of the 2024 Summer Paralympics in Paris, France.
- 2024 - CBR Sports Awards - Athlete of the Year - Para Sport, Australian Male Paralympian of the Year, AIS Sport Performance Awards - Male Para-Athlete of the Year, Athletics Australia - Russell Short Award for Male Para Athlete of the Year
- 2025 -CBR Sports Awards - Athlete of the Year - Para Sport, Athletics Australia Russell Short Male Para Athlete of the Year
