= Anat Peleg =

Israeli journalist and author

Anat Peleg (Hebrew: ענת פלג; born 2 October 1957) is an Israeli journalist, lecturer and author.

She is the author of Open Court: Media effects on the Legal Community. She is the director of the center for Media and Law in Bar-Ilan University, and a lecturer on Law and Media in Bar Ilan University, Tel Aviv University. She served as the senior legal-reporter of the Israel Radio for 17 years. She serves as the chairwoman of the Ethics Committee of Israeli Public Broadcasting Corporation.

== Biography ==
Anat Gottan (Peleg) was born in Tel Aviv to Yaakov and Dahlia Gottan. She is married to politician Israel Peleg, with whom she has two children.

== Journalism career ==
Peleg served as the Legal Affairs Reporter for Kol Israel (The Voice of Israel) Radio Station, News Department for 17 years(1993-2010). She covered the trial of Yigal Amir the assassin of the Prime Minister of Israel, Yitzhak Rabin, the rape-trial of Former Israel president [Moshe Katsav] and many other high-profile trials. She was the Legal Beat Head, Journalists Union of Tel Aviv and Legal analyst for Channel 1 TV news show "Erev Hadash" (New Evening). While living in Philadelphia, USA (1988-1992) she was a Columnist for "Ha'ir", weekly magazine in Israel, Lecturer on radio use in classrooms, Gratz College, Philadelphia, Speaker at women's organizations and script writer and producer of a video preparing children for surgery. In her Military Service (1975-1978), she served as a reporter and producer of radio documentaries for the IDF (Israel Defense Forces) Radio Station, Galei Zahal.

== Academic career ==
Peleg established the Center for Media and Law at Bar-Ilan University that promotes interdisciplinary research on "Trial by Media", the challenges and effects of the new media environment on the coverage of trials and legal affairs in Israel and abroad. The center is chaired by Prof. Ariel Bendor from the Bar-Ilan University faculty of law.

== Published works ==
This book, based on a PhD dissertation, aims to map the reciprocal relations between legal professionals and the media in Israel, and to examine the impact of the changes that occurred in the media on the press coverage of the courts and on legal decision-making and the legal process itself. It discusses for the first time the question of whether a process of mediatization in the legal system can be identified, as is claimed regarding the impact of the media on political institutions.. This book is based on in-depth interviews with 92 past and present lawyers, judges and journalists, on an analysis of 100 decisions handed down since the founding of the State of Israel that deal with the impact of the media on the legal process and on a comparative analysis of the media coverage of eight highly newsworthy criminal cases at different points of time in which the accused were public figures and judges.

- Peleg, A. and Bogoch, B. (2010). "The black robe and the yellow press: Perceptions of the media by Israeli judges," Media Frames: Israeli Journal of Communication, 5, 13-56 (Hebrew).
- Peleg, A. and Bogoch, R. (2011). "The lawyer as a spokesperson". HaMishpat Law Review, 15(1), 111-158 (Hebrew).
- Peleg, A. (2011). "The press as the court of justice: The coverage of popular trials in the Israeli press," Kesher: Journal of Media and Communications History in Israel and the Jewish World. 42, 35-46 (Hebrew).
- Peleg, A. (2012). Open Court. Tel-Aviv: Matar Publishing House, Ltd. (Hebrew)
- Peleg, A&Bogoch, R. (2012) ."Removing Justita's Blindfold: The Mediatization of Law in Israel", Media, Culture & Society,34,8,961-978.
- Peleg, A &Bogoch, R. "Mediatization, Legal Logic and the Coverage of Israeli Politicians on Trial”, Journalism Studies/Journalism Practice,8,3,311-325.
- Peleg, A & Bogoch, R . (2014). "Law in the age of Media-Logic"- Mediatization of Communication" handbooks of communication sciences, 21: Editor: Knut Lundby Publishers: De Gruyter Mouton .
- Peleg, A &Bogoch, R ."Silence is no more golden- Media, public relations and the judiciary in Israel" Oñati Socio-Legal Series(in print ).
- Peleg, A & Bogoch, R ."The weakness of power: Perceptions of professional autonomy among Israeli legal journalists" –Passages. Editors: Nelli Elias and Zvi Reich Publisher: Tel-Aviv: Tzivonim (Hebrew, in print).
- Pugach, D., Peleg, A. & Ronel. N. (2017). "Lingual Injury: Crime Victims between the Criminal Justice System and the Media". Journal of International Review of Victimology 24(1):026975801773019
