= Israel Peleg =

Israeli politician

- ישראל פלג

Director General of the Ministry of the Environment
- In office 1992–1996

Consul General of Israel in Philadelphia

Director of the Government Press Office

Personal details
- Born: June 5, 1949 (age 77) Ramat HaSharon, Israel
- Education: Hebrew University of Jerusalem
- Occupation: Civil Servant, diplomat, businessperson

Israel Peleg (Hebrew: ישראל פלג; born June 5, 1949) is an Israeli civil servant, diplomat and businessperson.

He served as the Director General of the Ministry of the Environment of the State of Israel, Consul General of Israel in Philadelphia (USA) and the Director of the Government Press Office. After more than twenty years of service in the government he initiated and founded the Governance of Jaffa, was appointed to the board of directors of leading companies, he was the chairman and President of H&O Fashion chain of stores. Peleg was the CEO of the company for Location and Restitution of Holocaust Victims' Assets in Israel. He was a Member of the Board of Directors of Clalit Health Services.

== Biography ==
Israel Peleg was born in Ramat HaSharon. He earned his Ph.D. from the Hebrew University in Jerusalem in June 1982. He is married to Dr. Anat Peleg, a former journalist broadcast on court and justice for 'Kol-Israel' –The Israel National Radio. Media Scholar and vice president of Israel Press Council.

== Civil Service Career ==
Peleg was Chief Assistant to the Director of the Government Central Office of Information (1973–1976) and was the coordinator of the Celebration for the 25th year of Independence of the State of Israel and in charge of domestic tours of Prime-Minister Yitzhak Rabin. When the Labor Party lost the election in 1977 Israel Peleg was appointed as the Secretary and Spokesman of the Labor Alignment Faction in the Knesset (The Parliament). He recruited young students to establish a professional system of Parliamentary Assistants, who would become a few years later leading figures in the Israeli business arena and political theater. When the first results of the 1981 elections were collected Peleg, as the spokesman, was too fast to announce Shimon Peres as "…The next Prime Minister of Israel", however according to the final results in the ballots it was Menachem Begin who formed the government.

As the Director of the Government Press Office (1984–1988) he introduced the Teletext system in Israel. He was a member of Prime Minister Shimon Peres' team of advisors, Chairman of the International Jewish Press Conference, member of the boards of directors of the Broadcasting Authority, the Government coin and medals company, and ISSTA – the student's travel agency.

During his tour of duty as Consul General of Israel in Philadelphia Peleg was in charge of the diplomatic-political relations with the respective administrations in the Mid-Atlantic States (Pennsylvania, Delaware, New Jersey, Kentucky, West Virginia). He was the President of the Diplomatic Corps of Philadelphia. He was involved in planning "Mission1000," Israel Fashion Week, and Israel Film Festival. He wrote a column published in Jewish newspapers in the US, "Just-a-Minute."

During his tenure as Director General of the Ministry of the Environment (1992–1996) he initiated the closure of 400 dumps and establishment of state-of-the-art landfills. The new word in Hebrew –"Mitmana"- which he coined represents a new concept of solid waste management in Israel. Peleg was the coordinator of President Shimon Peres' think tank on Sustainability. He was a member of the board of directors of Gaon-Agro-Industries.

As the Director General of the Ministry of the Environment, Peleg was Head of the Israeli delegation to the multilateral Peace Talks on Environment; Member of the National Board for Planning and Building; Chairman of the Inter-Ministerial Steering Committee for financial Assistance to Industries (for installing environmental facilities); Chairman of the Inter-Ministerial Committees for Licensing Land-Based Discharges to the Sea and Dumping of Waste in the Sea; Chairman of the Inter-Ministerial Steering Committee for the National Scheme for Solid Waste Management; Vice-president of the Bureau of the Mediterranean Action Plan (Organization of the Contracting Parties to the Convention for the Protection of the Mediterranean Sea against Pollution); Chairman of the Boards of the Fund for Prevention of Marine Pollution and the Cleanliness Fund; chairman of the Board of Directors of the Yarkon River Authority; Initiator of the National Program of Sustainable Development in Israel; Member of the US-Israel Science and Technology Commission; Initiator of the Year of the Environment.

He sat on the board of El-Al (1993–1999) the Blue Square retail supermarket chain (1996–2001) and Polar Investment Ltd. (1996–2001). He is a member of the board of the Academic College of Tel Aviv-Yafo; America-Israel Chamber of Commerce, America-Israel Friendship League (AIFL); and Israel-Poland Chamber of Commerce. In 1999, at the request of the Mayor of Tel Aviv-Yafo, Peleg prepared a conceptual program for the reconstruction and rejuvenating of Jaffa . He named it "Ha'Mishlama" - The Governance of Jaffa (Yafo). Peleg was the founder and first Director General of the Governance of Jaffa. At that time he was also a member of the board of the Eretz Israel Museum. Later he served as Chairman of Ganei Yehoshua (Tel Aviv-Yafo) – Yarkon Park, Begin (South) Park and the Zoological Park. He is a member of board of trustees of the Cameri Theater.

Peleg was the Chairman of the Public Committee on Tourism in Israel (2007–2008). This committee was appointed by Minister of Tourism Isaac Herzog and was composed of representatives of all the tourist industry. In its recommendations the committee called for the implementation of a new hotel rating system. In 2010 Peleg was appointed Honorary Consul of Cape Verde in Israel.

He was a member of the board of directors of JCT (Which held 5% of Leumi Bank in Israel).

Peleg is on The Government Companies Authority list of Directors Team. He was a Member of the Board of Directors of Clalit Health Services. member of the Board of Trustees of The Academic College of Tel Aviv-Yafo.

In 2024, he published the book "Past As Prologue"- Lessons from his career as a manager.

== Academic career ==
Peleg was a lecturer of Media and Politics at the Hebrew University and the Tel Aviv University. He lectures in Marketing Communications for the MBA track of the Center of Academic Studies.

He is a member of the board of trustees of the Tel Aviv-Yafo college.

== Business career ==
Peleg was owner and president of two advertising and public relations offices, Maof and Etgarim.

As Vice President of Israel's National Lottery (2000–2003) Peleg was in charge of Marketing, Advertising, Sales, Customer Service, Membership Club etc. with an advertising budget of NIS100m (US$25 million) and turnover of NIS3.2 billion (US$800million). He was awarded a prize by the Marketing and Advertising Association for a new game he introduced, "The Winning Horse."

From 2003 until 2009 Peleg was Acting Chairman and President of H&O Fashion chain, which operates 33 stores with total sale of NIS 470m (US$117million). In 2007, the chain purchased TagWoman with 25 stores.

In 2009 Peleg established Ispel Ltd., a private consulting firm for marketing and business development specializing in environment management.

On January 1, 2012, Peleg was appointed CEO of the Company for Location and Restitution of Holocaust Victims' Assets Ltd.
