= Danit Peleg =

Israeli fashion designer of printed clothing

- דנית פלג
- Born: Israel
- Occupation: Fashion designer
- Notable work: Recognized as one of Forbes' 50 top European women in technology
- Website: https://danitpeleg.com/

Danit Peleg (Hebrew: דנית פלג) is a fashion designer based in Tel Aviv, who created the first commercially available, 3D-printed clothing, and was recognized by Forbes as one of Europe's Top 50 Women in Tech.

== Education and career ==
Danit Peleg studied fashion design at the Shenkar College of Engineering and Design. Her dissertation researched the possibility of 3D-printing clothes. In 2014, she designed her first 3D-printed jacket, the Liberte, after a lot of experimentation with different materials and setups. After this initial success, she created more designs to create a complete collection.

After graduating in 2015, she started her own studio, via which she provides custom, 3D-printed designs for clients.

In 2016, she designed a 3D-printed dress for Amy Purdy, who wore it during a dance performance during the opening ceremony of the paralympics of 2016.

In 2017, a limited edition-set of 100 bomber jackets were created. For $1500 apiece, clients could get their own customized jacket printed.

Peleg organized a three-day workshop on 3D-printed fashion in 2018, where 15 students from all over the world learned about her design process. That year, she was also recognized as "one of Europe's 50 most influential woman in tech" by Forbes. She was named as one of the BBC 100 Women in 2019.
