= Russia at the 2016 Summer Paralympics =

- IPC code: RUS
- NPC: Russian Paralympic Committee
- Website: www.paralymp.ru (in Russian)

in Rio de Janeiro
- Medals: Gold 0 Silver 0 Bronze 0 Total 0

Summer Paralympics appearances (overview)
- 1996; 2000; 2004; 2008; 2012; 2016–2024

Other related appearances
- Soviet Union (1988); Unified Team (1992); RPC (2020)

Russia was originally scheduled to compete during the 2016 Summer Paralympics in Rio de Janeiro, Brazil, in what would have been its sixth consecutive appearance at the Summer Paralympics as an independent nation. Russia had qualified athletes in ten sports.

On 18 July 2016, an independent investigation commissioned by World Anti-Doping Agency concluded that it was shown "beyond a reasonable doubt" that the RUSADA, the Ministry of Sport, the Federal Security Service (FSB) and the Centre of Sports Preparation of the National Teams of Russia had "operated for the protection of doped Russian athletes" within a "state-directed failsafe system" using "the disappearing positive [test] methodology." According to the McLaren Report, the Disappearing Positive Methodology operated from "at least late 2011 to August 2015." It was used on 643 positive samples, a number that the authors consider "only a minimum" due to limited access to Russian records.

On 7 August 2016, the International Paralympic Committee announced that it had voted unanimously to ban the entire Russian Paralympic team from competing in the 2016 Summer Paralympics, in the wake of a larger scandal that exposed the participation of Russian Olympic and Paralympic athletes in a state-sponsored doping program. The Russian Paralympic Committee appealed to the Court of Arbitration for Sport (CAS) and the Federal Supreme Court of Switzerland, but both bodies upheld the IPC's decision. IPC president Philip Craven stated that Russia's actions had demonstrated a failure in its obligations to comply with established anti-doping protocols.

On 9 December 2016, Canadian lawyer Richard McLaren published the second part of his independent report. The investigation found that from 2011 to 2015, more than 1,000 Russian competitors in various sports (including summer, winter, and Paralympic sports) benefited from the cover-up. Emails indicate that they included five blind powerlifters, who may have been given drugs without their knowledge, and a fifteen-year-old.

== Disability classifications ==
Every participant at the Paralympics has their disability grouped into one of five disability categories: amputation, the condition may be congenital or sustained through injury or illness; cerebral palsy; wheelchair athletes, there is often overlap between this and other categories; visual impairment, including blindness; Les autres, any physical disability that does not fall strictly under one of the other categories, for example dwarfism or multiple sclerosis. Each Paralympic sport then has its own classifications, dependent upon the specific physical demands of competition. Events are given a code, made of numbers and letters, describing the type of event and classification of the athletes competing. Some sports, such as athletics, divide athletes by both the category and severity of their disabilities, other sports, for example swimming, group competitors from different categories together, the only separation being based on the severity of the disability.

== Disqualification ==
On 18 July 2016, the World Anti-Doping Agency (WADA) published a 97-page report by Canadian attorney Richard McLaren, covering significant state-sponsored doping in Russia. It found that Russia's Ministry of Sport and Federal Security Service (FSB) had operated a "state-dictated" system to implement an extensive doping program, which included the use of a "disappearing positive methodology" (DPM) – the process of swapping out positive urine samples for clean ones in order to evade detection. The report detailed 27 positive samples tied to Paralympic sports, while the IPC found forensic evidence that the DPM had been used during the 2014 Winter Paralympics.

On 7 August 2016, following the start of the 2016 Summer Olympics, the governing board of the International Paralympic Committee voted unanimously to suspend the Russian Paralympic Committee and ban the entire Russian Paralympic team from participating in the 2016 Summer Paralympics. IPC president Philip Craven cited Russia's "[inability] to ensure compliance with and enforcement of the IPC anti-doping code and the world anti-doping code within their own national jurisdiction", meaning that the country could not "fulfil its fundamental obligation as an IPC member". On 15 August 2016, the RPC filed a request for an appeal to the Court of Arbitration for Sport (CAS). On 23 August 2016, the CAS upheld the IPC's decision. In a statement, Craven considered the decision to be a "sad day" and a "new beginning" for the Paralympic movement, explaining that the ban would be a "catalyst for change" in the country, and stated that Russia was welcome to return to the Paralympics once it is capable of "fulfilling its obligations to ensure fair competition for all".

The decision to issue a blanket ban contrasts the treatment of Russia's Olympic team, whose athletes were allowed to compete if they were individually cleared by their sport's respective governing body and an International Olympic Committee panel. The IOC's actions were criticized for ignoring WADA's recommendation of a blanket ban. 278 of the 389 members of the team were cleared to compete: the remaining 111 were barred from participating, which included all but one member of the Russian athletics team (Darya Klishina) and the entire Russian weightlifting team due to blanket bans issued by the International Association of Athletics Federations and International Weightlifting Federation.

Reactions in Russia were overwhelmingly negative. Some Russians described the allegations as an anti-Russian plot while others stated that Russia was "just doing what the rest of the world does". Russian President Vladimir Putin said that Russia had "never supported any violations in sport, we have never supported it at the state level, and we will never support this" and that the allegations were part of an "anti-Russia policy" by the West. Aleksei Pushkov, chairman of Russia's parliamentary foreign affairs committee, said that the IAAF's decision to uphold its ban was "an act of political revenge against Russia for its independent foreign policy." A member of Russia's parliament, Vadim Dengin, stated, "The entire doping scandal is a pure falsification, invented to discredit and humiliate Russia."After the Court of Arbitration for Sport turned down an appeal by Russian athletes, pole vaulter Yelena Isinbayeva wrote, "Let all those pseudo clean foreign athletes breathe a sigh of relief and win their pseudo gold medals in our absence. They always did fear strength." The Ministry of Foreign Affairs called the ruling a "crime against sport". A poll by the Levada Center found that 14% of Russians believed that the country's athletes had doped in Sochi, 71% did not believe WADA's reports, and 15% decided not to answer.

On 30 August 2016, the Russian Paralympic Committee announced that at least 100 members of the banned team had filed for appeals from the IPC; the Committee confirmed it had received these letters, and stated that discussions were "ongoing". The next day, following a request for an appeal by the RPC, the Federal Supreme Court of Switzerland also upheld the CAS's decision. On 1 September 2016, the IPC stated that Russian athletes would not be allowed to compete using a neutral flag.

== Protests ==
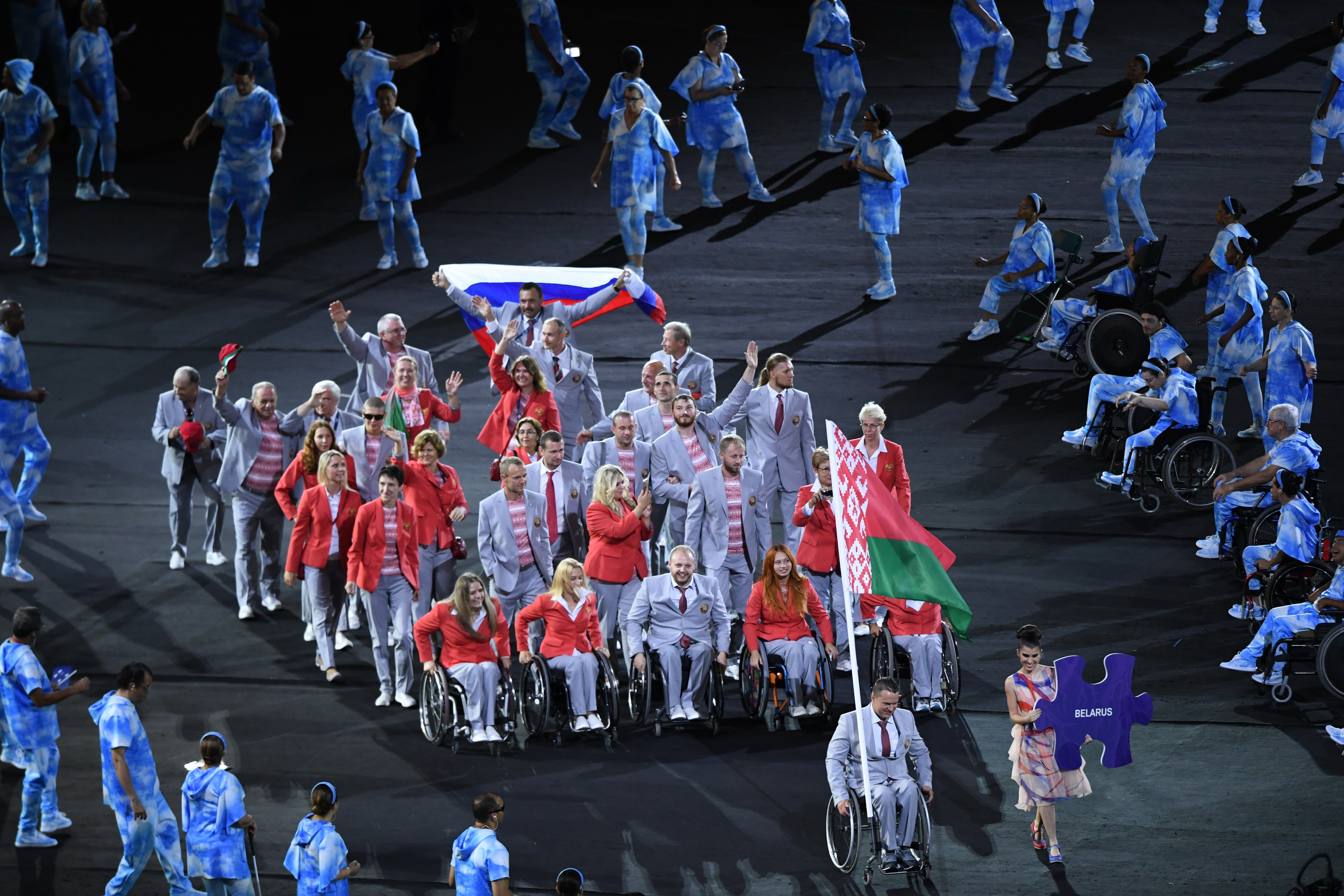
A Belarusian official carried a Russian flag alongside his delegation during the Parade of Nations.

During the entry of Belarus at the opening ceremony's parade of nations, Andrey Fomochkin—a member of the country's Ministry of Sport, was seen holding a Russian flag as a display of solidarity to its neighbour. The flag was quickly confiscated by officials; after he was identified, Fomochkin's accreditation was revoked by the IPC for violating policies which forbid political protests and gestures. The IPC also warned that it would closely monitor medal presentations involving Belarusian athletes to ensure they do not display political gestures. Fomochkin's actions were praised by Belarusians (including President Alexander Lukashenko), as well as Maria Zakharova—a member of Russia's Ministry of Foreign Affairs; she stated to a news agency that Fomochkin had "[shown] solidarity with people who were disgracefully treated in an inhumane way in not being allowed to compete at the Paralympics".

== Pre-disqualification ==
=== 5-a-side football ===
Russia qualified for the Paralympics after finishing second at the 2015 IBSA Blind Football European Championships. Playing in Group B, Russia opened the tournament with a 1–0 victory against France, followed by two 0–0 draws against Belgium and Spain. With a 1–0 victory against Greece in their final group stage match, Russia finished second in its group. In the elimination round, Russia played against Group A winner England. Russia won 1–0 on penalty kicks, but lost to Turkey 1–0 in the gold medal match.

=== 7-a-side football ===
The Russia national 7-a-side football team qualified for Rio 2016 after winning the 2015 CP World Championships, defeating reigning European champions Ukraine. They went into the competition as the top ranked team in the world. The team was in Group B with Scotland, Northern Ireland and Germany.

The draw for the tournament was held on 6 May at the 2016 Pre Paralympic Tournament in Salou, Spain. Russia was put into Group B with the United States, Netherlands and Argentina. Iran qualified for the 2016 Rio Games following the suspension of Russia. The IPC ruled that there could not be a redraw for the groups. This resulted in Iran being put into Group A with the Netherlands, Argentina and the United States.

Going into the Paralympics, Russia was ranked second in the world.

=== Athletics ===
Russia had qualified a number of athletes in track and field. Following the suspension, two of these spots were re-allocated to Australia.

=== Archery ===
Russia qualified ten archers as a result of their performance at the 2015 World Archery Para Championships. They included one spot each in the men's and women's compound open, three spots each in the men's and women's recurve open, and one spot each in the men's and women's W1. Among the archers that had qualified included Bato Tsydendorzhiev, Margarita Sidorenko, Svetlana Barantseva, Irina Rossiyskaya, Sergey Khutakov, Anton Zaypaev and Stepanida Artakhinova.

=== Cycling ===
Being among the highest-ranked countries on the men's and women's UCI Para-Cycling Nations Ranking Lists as of 31 December 2014, Russia qualified for Rio 2016, assuming they continued to meet all other eligibility requirements.

=== Equestrian ===
Russian riders had qualified to participate in the individual event. Following their suspension, their spot was re-allocated.

=== Goalball ===
The Russia women's national goalball team qualified for Rio 2016 after finishing second at the 2014 IBSA Goalball World Championships. Their spot was re-allocated to Australia.

=== Judo ===
With one pathway for qualification being a top finish at the 2014 IBSA Judo World Championships, judoka Abdula Kuramagomedov had qualified for Rio by finishing first in the Men's B2 100 kg.

=== Paracanoeing ===
Russia earned a qualifying spot in the inaugural Paracanoeing competition following their performance at the 2015 ICF Canoe Sprint & Paracanoe World Championships in Milan, Italy, where the top six finishers in each Paralympic event earned a qualifying spot for their nation. Alexandra Dupik earned the spot for Russia after finishing fourth in the women's KL1 event. Nadezda Andreeva earned a second spot for Ukraine after finishing fifth in the women's KL2 event. Leonid Krylov earned a third spot for Russia after finishing third in the men's KL3 event.

=== Rowing ===
One pathway for qualification at the 2015 FISA World Rowing Championships was a top-eight finish in a medal event. Russia qualified in the AS Men's Single Sculls event with a fourth-place finish with a time of 04:56.780.

=== Shooting ===
The first opportunity to qualify for shooting in Rio took place at the 2014 IPC Shooting World Championships in Suhl. Shooters earned spots for their NPC. Russia earned a qualifying spot at this event in the P1 – 10m Air Pistol Men SH1 event as a result of Sergey Malyshev winning a silver medal. Valeriy Ponomarenko earned a second spot in the same event for Russia. Tatiana Ryabchenko gave Russia a third spot for Rio, this one in the R6 – 50m Rifle Prone Mixed SH1 event. Sergey Nochevnoy gave Russia their fourth spot at Rio, this time in the R3 – 10Mm Air Rifle Prone Mixed SH1 event.

Three opportunities to qualify were available through the 2015 IPC Shooting World Cup events in Osijek, Sydney, and Fort Benning. In Osijek, Antonina Zhukova qualified in the R5 – 10m Air Rifle Prone Mixed SH2 event. In Sydney, Nikolai Krygin qualified in the R5 - Mixed 10m Air Rifle Prone SH2 event. At Fort Benning, Natalia Dalekova qualified in the P4 Mixed 50m Pistol event and Andrey Kozhemyakin qualified in the R7 Men's 50m Rifle 3 Positions event.

=== Swimming ===
The top two finishers in each Rio medal event at the 2015 IPC Swimming World Championships earned a qualifying spot for their country. Denis Tarasov earned Russia a spot after winning gold in the Men's 100m Butterfly S8. Alexander Makarov earned Russia another spot after winning silver in the Men's 200m Freestyle S3. Roman Zhdanov earned Russia a third spot after winning silver in the Men's 200m Freestyle S4. Andrei Granichka earned Russia a fourth spot after winning silver in the Men's 400m Freestyle S6. The fifth spot for Russia was earned by Valeriia Shabalina who won silver in the Women's 100m Breaststroke SB14. The sixth spot was earned by Ani Palian who won silver in the Women's 100m Freestyle S7. Anna Krivshina grabbed a seventh spot for Russia after winning gold in the Women's 50m Freestyle S13. Dmitrii Kokarev earned the country's eighth spot after winning silver in the Men's 100m Backstroke S2. Iurii Luchkin earned Russia's ninth spot in the Men's 100m Breaststroke SB5 with a gold medal finish.

=== Wheelchair tennis ===
Russia had qualified two players in the women's singles event, Ludmila Bubnova and Viktoriia Lvova. Following their suspension, one spot was re-allocated by the IPC to Shelby Baron of the United States. Another spot was re-allocated to Australia.
