= William Stedman (athlete) =

New Zealand para-athlete

Personal information
- Born: 5 December 1999 (age 26)
- Home town: Christchurch, New Zealand
- Spouse: Annika Stedman
- Parents: Phil Stedman (father); Catherine Stedman (mother)
- Relative(s): Isabelle Stedman (sister); Luke Stedman (brother)

Sport
- Country: New Zealand
- Sport: Para athletics
- Disability: Ataxic cerebral palsy
- Disability class: T36
Medal record
Men's para athletics
Representing New Zealand
Paralympic Games
Silver medal – second place	2020 Tokyo	Long jump T36
Silver medal – second place	2024 Paris	400 m T36
Bronze medal – third place	2016 Rio de Janeiro	400 m T36
Bronze medal – third place	2016 Rio de Janeiro	800 m T36
Bronze medal – third place	2020 Tokyo	400 m T36
World Championships
Gold medal – first place	2024 Kobe	400 m T36
Silver medal – second place	2023 Paris	400 m T36
Silver medal – second place	2023 Paris	Long jump T36
Silver medal – second place	2024 Kobe	Long jump T36
Silver medal – second place	2025 New Delhi	Long jump T36
Bronze medal – third place	2025 New Delhi	400 m T36

William Stedman (born 5 December 1999) is a New Zealand para-athlete, competing in sprints, middle-distance running and long jump events.

== Biography ==
Stedman attended Middleton Grange School in Christchurch, New Zealand. He studies engineering at the University of Canterbury.

He represented New Zealand at the 2016 Summer Paralympics in Rio de Janeiro, where he won bronze medals in the men's 400 metres T36 and 800 metres T36.

In the 800 metres event of the 2017 World Para Athletics Championships in London he won the silver medal with a time of 2:11.86 after he achieved a seasonal and personal best of 2:11.68 that year.

In 2020 Stedman represented New Zealand at the 2020 Summer Paralympics in Tokyo, Japan. He won the silver medal in the long jump T36 and the bronze medal in the 400 metres T36.

He married Annika Stedman on 29 January 2022.

=== Personal bests ===
Event	Result	Competition	Date	Location	Notes
100 metres (T36)	13.09	NZ Secondary School Championships	4–6 December 2016	Timaru, New Zealand	NR
200 metres (T36)	26.41	NZ Secondary School Championships	4–6 December 2016	Timaru, New Zealand	NR
400 metres (T36)	55.69	Summer Paralympics	16 September 2016	Rio de Janeiro, Brazil	AR
800 metres (T36)	2:11.98	Summer Paralympics	17 September 2016	Rio de Janeiro, Brazil	NR
Long jump (T36)	5.35	Summer Paralympics	12 September 2016	Rio de Janeiro, Brazil	NR

== Awards and recognition ==
Stedman was named 2015 Para Athlete of the Year by Sport Canterbury and in 2016 he was named Junior Sportsperson of the Year by ParaFed Canterbury. In 2017 he was named Junior Athlete of the Year at the Canterbury Athletics Awards and also shared the Middle Distance Athlete of the Year award with Angie Petty. In 2020 he was named Para Athlete of the Year at the Canterbury Athletics Awards.
