= Athletics at the 2020 Summer Paralympics – Men's long jump =

The Men's long jump athletics events for the 2020 Summer Paralympics took place at the Tokyo National Stadium from August 27 to September 4, 2021. A total of 10 events were contested in this discipline.

== Schedule ==
R	Round 1	½	Semifinals	F	Final

Date	Fri 27		Sat 28		Sun 29		Mon 30		Tue 31		Wed 1		Thu 2		Fri 3		Sat 4	
Event	M	E	M	E	M	E	M	E	M	E	M	E	M	E	M	E	M	E
T11		F																
T12							F											
T13																	F	
T20																		F
T36								F										
T37													F					
T38											F							
T47									F									
T63				F														
T64												F						

== Medal summary ==
The following is a summary of the medals awarded across all long jump events.

Classification	Gold		Silver		Bronze	
T11	Di Dongdong; China	6.47	Lex Gillette; United States	6.17	Ronan Pallier; France	6.15
T12	Amir Khosravani; Iran	7.21	Leinier Savon Pineda; Cuba	7.16 AR	Said Najafzade; Azerbaijan	7.03
T13	Orkhan Aslanov; Azerbaijan	7.36 AR	Iván José Cano Blanco; Spain	7.04	Isaac Jean-Paul; United States	6.93
T20	Abdul Latif Romly; Malaysia	7.45	Athanasios Prodromou; Greece	7.17	Nicholas Hum; Australia	7.12 AR
T36	Evgenii Torsunov; RPC	5.76 GR	William Stedman; New Zealand	5.64 AR	Roman Pavlyk; Ukraine	5.63
T37	Vladyslav Zahrebelnyi; Ukraine	6.59 AR	Brian Lionel Impellizzeri; Argentina	6.44	Mateus Evangelista; Brazil	6.05
T38	Zhu Dening; China	7.31 WR	Zhong Huanghao; China	6.80	José Lemos; Colombia	6.78 AR
T47	Robiel Yankiel Sol Cervantes; Cuba	7.46 GR	Roderick Townsend-Roberts; United States	7.43	Nikita Kotukov; RPC	7.34
T63	Ntando Mahlangu; South Africa	7.17 WR	Léon Schäfer; Germany	7.12 GR	Daniel Wagner; Denmark	7.07
T64	Markus Rehm; Germany	8.18	Dimitri Pavadé; France	7.39	Trenten Merrill; United States	7.08 AR

== Results ==
=== T11 ===
The T11 category is for athletes with a visual impairment. A T11 athlete may be entirely without sight, or be able to perceive light, but have no ability to see the shape of a hand at any distance. T11 athletes commonly run with guides.

Records

Prior to this competition, the existing world, Paralympic, and area records were as follows:

World record	Lex Gillette (USA)	6.73	Mesa, Arizona	7 May 2011
Paralympic record	José Rodríguez (ESP)	6.67	Atlanta, Georgia	18 August 1996

Area	Distance (m)	Wind	Athlete	Nation
Africa	6.11	+1.5	Firas Bentria	Algeria
America	6.73 WR	-1.6	Lex Gillette	United States
Asia	6.60	+0.2	Yang Chuan-Hui	Chinese Taipei
Europe	6.67 PR	-1.3	José Rodríguez	Spain
Oceania	Vacant			

Results

The final in this classification took place on 27 August 2021, at 19:05:

Rank	Athlete	Nationality	1	2	3	4	5	6	Best	Notes
1st place, gold medalist(s)	Di Dongdong	China	6.35	6.35	6.38	6.47	6.29	x	6.47	SB
2nd place, silver medalist(s)	Lex Gillette	United States	x	6.17	6.05	6.14	6.06	6.16	6.17	
3rd place, bronze medalist(s)	Ronan Pallier	France	x	6.09	6.15	6.11	5.98	6.09	6.15	
4	Yang Chuan-hui	Chinese Taipei	5.93	5.88	5.94	6.07	x	5.69	6.07	SB
5	Xavier Porras	Spain	x	5.72	5.89	5.93	5.90	5.81	5.93	
6	Ricardo Costa de Oliveira	Brazil	5.89	x	-	x	5.02	5.00	5.89	

=== T12 ===
The T12 category is for athletes with visual impairment. Athletes in this category will generally have some residual sight, the ability to recognise the shape of a hand at a distance of 2 metres and the ability to perceive clearly will be no more than 2/60. T12 athletes commonly run with guides.

Records

Prior to this competition, the existing world, Paralympic, and area records were as follows:

World record	Matthias Schröder (GER)	7.47	Berlin, Germany	12 July 2009
Paralympic record	Hilton Langenhoven (RSA)	7.31	Beijing, China	13 September 2008

Area	Distance (m)	Wind	Athlete	Nation
Africa	7.43 PR	-0.1	Hilton Langenhoven	South Africa
America	7.11	-0.7	Luis Felipe Gutiérrez	Cuba
Asia	7.44	-1.4	Doniyor Saliev	Uzbekistan
Europe	7.47 WR	+0.1	Matthias Schröder	Germany
Oceania	5.87	+1.7	Fuata Faktaufon	Fiji

Results

The final in this classification took place on 30 August 2021, at 9:30:

Rank	Athlete	Nationality	1	2	3	4	5	6	Best	Notes
1st place, gold medalist(s)	Amir Khosravani	Iran	x	7.21	7.01	6.92	6.86	6.72	7.21	PB
2nd place, silver medalist(s)	Leinier Savon Pineda	Cuba	6.92	6.82	4.47	6.83	7.01	7.16	7.16	AR
3rd place, bronze medalist(s)	Said Najafzade	Azerbaijan	7.00	x	6.98	7.03	6.76	6.91	7.03	
4	Doniyor Saliev	Uzbekistan	6.90	6.78	6.92	6.83	6.81	6.88	6.92	SB
5	Kamil Aliyev	Azerbaijan	6.88	6.79	6.82	6.80	6.89	6.86	6.89	SB
6	Siarhei Burdukou	Belarus	6.74	x	4.60	6.70	x	6.57	6.74	
7	Tobias Jonsson	Sweden	6.42	6.50	6.27	6.25	x	6.29	6.50	SB
8	Olof Ryberg	Sweden	6.15	6.13	6.25	6.17	6.02	5.98	6.25	SB
9	Ángel Jiménez	Cuba	6.25	1.90	5.61	Did not advance			6.25	
10	Marcel Böttger	Germany	5.55	5.61	5.48	Did not advance			5.61	

=== T13 ===
The T13 category is for athletes with a moderate visual impairment. Athletes in this category have a variety of visual impairments, but can typically recognize contours from a distance of 2 to 6 metres. Athletes in this category do not typically require a guide.

Records

Prior to this competition, the existing world, Paralympic, and area records were as follows:

World record	Luis Felipe Gutiérrez (CUB)	7.66	Guadalajara, Mexico	18 November 2011
Paralympic record	Luis Felipe Gutiérrez (CUB)	7.54	London, United Kingdom	1 September 2012

Area	Distance (m)	Wind	Athlete	Nation
Africa	6.15	-1.1	Jonathan Ntutu	South Africa
America	7.66 WR	-0.8	Luis Felipe Gutiérrez	Cuba
Asia	6.93	+1.4	Islam Salimov	Kazakhstan
Europe	7.34	+0.0	Ihar Fartunau	Belarus
Oceania	4.99	+1.1	Ranjesh Prakash	Fiji

Results

The final in this classification took place on 4 September 2021, at 10:02:

Rank	Athlete	Nationality	1	2	3	4	5	6	Best	Notes
1st place, gold medalist(s)	Orkhan Aslanov	Azerbaijan	7.03	7.28	7.36	6.91	7.14	3.78	7.36	AR
2nd place, silver medalist(s)	Iván José Cano Blanco	Spain	7.04	6.94	6.87	x	x	–	7.04	=PB
3rd place, bronze medalist(s)	Isaac Jean-Paul	United States	6.63	x	6.58	6.39	5.39	6.93	6.93	
4	Zak Skinner	Great Britain	6.42	x	6.91	x	6.75	x	6.91	
5	Jorge Benjamín González Sauceda	Mexico	6.32	6.48	6.44	6.36	6.07	x	6.48	SB
6	Wong Kar Gee	Malaysia	x	x	5.93	x	r		5.93	PB
7	Hilario Chavela	Mozambique	5.18	5.16	x	5.14	x	x	5.18	
8	Ferdinand Compaore	Burkina Faso	4.98	4.84	4.79	4.81	4.84	4.65	4.98	PB

=== T20 ===
The T20 category is for athletes with intellectual impairment. T20 athletes have an IQ score of 75 or less.

Records

Prior to this competition, the existing world, Paralympic, and area records were as follows:

World record	Abdul Latif Romly (MAS)	7.64	Jakarta, Indonesia	9 October 2018
Paralympic record	Abdul Latif Romly (MAS)	7.60	Rio de Janeiro, Brazil	11 September 2016

Area	Distance (m)	Wind	Athlete	Nation
Africa	6.58	-1.2	Eddy Capdor	Mauritius
America	6.88	-1.1	Roberto Carlos Chala Espinoza	Ecuador
Asia	7.64 WR	+0.6	Abdul Latif Romly	Malaysia
Europe	7.39	+0.9	Ranki Oberoi	Netherlands
Oceania	6.89	+0.5	Nicholas Hum	Australia

Results

The final in this classification took place on 4 September 2021, at 19:00:

Rank	Athlete	Nationality	1	2	3	4	5	6	Best	Notes
1st place, gold medalist(s)	Abdul Latif Romly	Malaysia	7.26	7.45	7.24	x	5.56	r	7.45	SB
2nd place, silver medalist(s)	Athanasios Prodromou	Greece	7.03	7.02	6.83	x	7.17	7.04	7.17	PB
3rd place, bronze medalist(s)	Nicholas Hum	Australia	6.95	7.09	6.85	7.12	7.06	6.09	7.12	AR
4	Kanta Kokubo	Japan	7.01	6.83	x	6.63	6.72	6.72	6.83	PB
5	Zoran Talić	Croatia	6.48	6.78	6.80	6.82	x	6.52	6.82	
6	Hassan Dawshi	Saudi Arabia	6.79	x	6.15	6.39	6.77	6.52	6.79	PB
7	Ranki Oberoi	Netherlands	6.60	6.76	6.66	6.26	x	x	6.76	SB
8	Roberto Carlos Chala Espinoza	Ecuador	6.56	6.11	5.91	6.18	-	-	6.56	SB
9	Eddy Capdor	Mauritius	4.45	4.36	6.32	did not qualify			6.32	SB
10	Damian Josue Carcelen Delgado	Ecuador	6.18	6.24	6.24	did not qualify			6.24	SB
11	Nikki Tang	Hong Kong	5.74	x	5.57	did not qualify			5.74	SB
	Gustavo Henrique de Oliveira	Brazil							DNS	

=== T36 ===
The T36 category is for ambulant athletes with cerebral palsy. These athletes do not have the capacity to remain still and they show involuntary movements with all four limbs affected. They usually walk without assistive devices.

Records

Prior to this competition, the existing world, Paralympic, and area records were as follows:

World record	Evgenii Torsunov (RUS)	5.93	Grosseto, Italy	11 June 2016
Paralympic record	Brayden Davidson (AUS)	5.62	Rio de Janeiro, Brazil	12 September 2016

Area	Distance (m)	Wind	Athlete	Nation
Africa	4.50	+0.0	Hichem Nechchadi	Morocco
America	5.62	+0.1	Rodrigo Parreira	Brazil
Asia	5.56	-2.0	Izzat Turgunov	Uzbekistan
Europe	5.93 WR	+1.9	Evgenii Torsunov	Russia
Oceania	5.62 PR	+0.3	Brayden Davidson	Australia

Results

The final in this classification took place on 30 August 2021, at 19:14:

Rank	Athlete	Nationality	1	2	3	4	5	6	Best	Notes
1st place, gold medalist(s)	Evgenii Torsunov	RPC	5.57	5.38	5.58	5.76	5.67	5.68	5.76	GR
2nd place, silver medalist(s)	William Stedman	New Zealand	x	5.44	5.42	5.46	x	5.64	5.64	AR
3rd place, bronze medalist(s)	Roman Pavlyk	Ukraine	5.30	5.42	5.55	5.48	5.51	5.63	5.63	
4	Aser Mateus Almeida	Brazil	5.58	x	5.37	5.43	5.30	5.54	5.58	
5	Rodrigo Parreira	Brazil	5.45	5.14	5.49	5.48	5.39	5.11	5.49	SB
6	Omar Acosta	Colombia	x	x	5.23	5.26	5.48	5.28	5.48	PB
7	Oleksandr Lytvynenko	Ukraine	5.45	5.23	x	5.09	5.23	5.36	5.45	
8	Yang Yifei	China	5.24	5.24	5.35	5.32	5.18	5.40	5.40	SB
9	Taha Al Harrasi	Oman	4.24	4.20	4.13	did not advance			4.24	
	Izzat Turgunov	Uzbekistan	x	x	x	did not advance			NM	

=== T37 ===
The T37 category is for ambulant athletes with cerebral palsy. These athletes have movement and coordination problems on one half of their body. They have good ability in their dominant side of their body (ie hemiplegia).

Records

Prior to this competition, the existing world, Paralympic, and area records were as follows:

World record	Shang Guangxu (CHN)	6.77	Rio de Janeiro, Brazil	13 September 2016
Paralympic record	Shang Guangxu (CHN)	6.77	Rio de Janeiro, Brazil	13 September 2016

Area	Distance (m)	Wind	Athlete	Nation
Africa	6.05	+0.1	Andrea Dalle Ave	South Africa
America	6.53	+0.1	Mateus Evangelista	Brazil
Asia	6.77 WR	-0.1	Shang Guangxu	China
Europe	6.33	-1.4	Vladyslav Zahrebelnyi	Ukraine
Oceania	5.98	+0.4	Darren Thrupp	Australia

Results

The final in this classification took place on 2 September 2021, at 9:35:

Rank	Athlete	Nationality	1	2	3	4	5	6	Best	Notes
1st place, gold medalist(s)	Vladyslav Zahrebelnyi	Ukraine	6.30	6.32	6.59	6.09	6.24	6.40	6.59	AR
2nd place, silver medalist(s)	Brian Lionel Impellizzeri	Argentina	6.00	6.44	6.35	6.04	6.18	6.24	6.44	PB
3rd place, bronze medalist(s)	Mateus Evangelista	Brazil	5.87	6.05	5.80	x	x	x	6.05	SB
4	Chermen Kobesov	RPC	6.00	6.00	5.77	5.92	x	5.64	6.00	
5	Sergei Biriukov	RPC	x	5.95	5.87	5.72	x	5.96	5.96	PB
6	Konstantinos Kamaras	Greece	x	x	5.95	x	x	5.70	5.95	
7	Mateusz Owczarek	Poland	5.81	5.71	5.85	x	5.68	5.77	5.85	
8	Valentin Bertrand	France	x	5.70	5.69	5.57	5.66	5.80	5.80	

=== T38 ===
The T38 category is for ambulant athletes with cerebral palsy. T38 athletes have the mildest form of impairment caused by cerebral palsy, often in only one limb, and not affecting the ability to run, walk or jump freely, although impairing performance. T38 athletes may suffer minor co-ordination difficulties.

Records

Prior to this competition, the existing world, Paralympic, and area records were as follows:

World record	Hu Jianwen (CHN)	7.13	Doha, Qatar	25 October 2015
Paralympic record	Hu Jianwen (CHN)	6.64	Rio de Janeiro, Brazil	15 September 2016

Area	Distance (m)	Wind	Athlete	Nation
Africa	6.58	-0.3	Dyan Buis	South Africa
America	6.50	+0.3	José Lemos	Colombia
Asia	7.13 WR	+1.6	Hu Jianwen	China
Europe	6.42	+0.4	Khetag Khinchagov	Russia
Oceania	6.16	-0.3	Ari Gesini	Australia

Results

The final in this classification took place on 1 September 2021, at 9:39:

Rank	Athlete	Nationality	1	2	3	4	5	6	Best	Notes
1st place, gold medalist(s)	Zhu Dening	China	7.06	7.13	7.31	–	–	–	7.31	WR
2nd place, silver medalist(s)	Zhong Huanghao	China	x	6.57	6.69	6.61	6.62	6.80	6.80	PB
3rd place, bronze medalist(s)	José Lemos	Colombia	6.47	6.45	6.70	x	x	6.78	6.78	AR
4	Khetag Khinchagov	RPC	6.23	6.37	x	6.51	6.31	6.53	6.53	=AR
5	Mykyta Senyk	Ukraine	6.48	6.53	x	6.09	6.16	6.53	6.53	=AR
6	Mohamed Farhat Chida	Tunisia	6.23	6.33	6.20	5.89	6.06	6.36	6.36	SB
7	Juan Gómez Coa	Colombia	6.27	6.25	6.17	x	x	x	6.27	
8	David Budoian	RPC	x	6.09	x	x	x	x	6.09	
9	Zhou Peng	China	5.77	6.00	5.96	Did not advance			6.00	
10	Dyan Buis	South Africa	x	5.94	x	Did not advance			5.94	
11	Ari Gesini	Australia	4.19	5.89	5.68	Did not advance			5.89	
12	Davit Kavtaradze	Georgia	x	5.73	5.76	Did not advance			5.76	

=== T47 ===
The T47 category is for athletes who have a single below elbow or wrist amputation or similar disability, with normal function in both legs.

Records

Prior to this competition, the existing world, Paralympic, and area records were as follows:

World record	Arnaud Assoumani (FRA)	7.58	Christchurch, New Zealand	22 January 2011
Paralympic record	Roderick Townsend-Roberts (USA)	7.41	Rio de Janeiro, Brazil	14 September 2016

Area	Distance (m)	Wind	Athlete	Nation
Africa	7.07	-0.1	Mohammed Dif	Morocco
America	7.41 PR	+0.2	Roderick Townsend-Roberts	United States
Asia	7.53	+1.4	Wang Hao	China
Europe	7.58 WR	+0.6	Arnaud Assoumani	France
Oceania	5.57	+1.5	Anthony Jordan	Australia

Results

The final in this classification took place on 31 August 2021, at 9:30:

Rank	Athlete	Nationality	Class	1	2	3	4	5	6	Best	Notes
1st place, gold medalist(s)	Robiel Yankiel Sol Cervantes	Cuba	T46	7.46	7.37	7.20	-	7.23	x	7.46	GR
2nd place, silver medalist(s)	Roderick Townsend-Roberts	United States	T46	7.08	7.36	7.17	7.19	7.35	7.43	7.43	PB
3rd place, bronze medalist(s)	Nikita Kotukov	RPC	T47	x	x	6.92	7.20	7.30	7.34	7.34	PB
4	Dallas Wise	United States	T46	7.10	x	7.21	7.05	7.30	x	7.30	
5	Wang Hao	China	T46	7.16	7.18	7.17	7.14	6.96	x	7.18	SB
6	Tobi Fawehinmi	United States	T46	7.09	x	x	x	-	-	7.09	
7	Nemanja Matijasević	Serbia	T47	x	7.07	7.01	6.92	x	6.94	7.07	PB
8	Arnaud Assoumani	France	T47	x	x	6.65	6.89	x	x	6.89	SB
9	Michel Gustavo Abraham de Deus	Brazil	T46	6.25	6.55	x	Did not advance			6.55	SB
10	Setyo Budi Hartanto	Indonesia	T47	6.47	6.28	3.79	Did not advance			6.47	SB
11	Chen Hongjie	China	T46	6.06	6.03	6.26	Did not advance			6.26	SB
12	Sorie Kargbo	Sierra Leone	T46	5.78	5.26	5.74	Did not advance			5.78	PB
13	Hossain Rasouli	Afghanistan	T47	4.37	4.21	4.46	Did not advance			4.46	PB

=== T63 ===
Records

Prior to this competition, the existing world, Paralympic, and area records were as follows:

World record	Léon Schäfer (GER)	7.24	Leverkusen, Germany	21 August 2020
Paralympic record	Heinrich Popow (GER)	6.70	Rio de Janeiro, Brazil	17 September 2016

Area	Distance (m)	Wind	Athlete	Nation
Africa	4.41	-0.1	Record Mark	
America	5.90	+1.5	Ezra Frech	United States
Asia	6.70	+0.8	Atsushi Yamamoto	Japan
Europe	7.24 WR	+0.2	Léon Schäfer	Germany
Oceania	Vacant			

Results

The final in this classification took place on 28 August 2021, at 19:51:

Rank	Athlete	Nationality	1	2	3	4	5	6	Best	Notes
1st place, gold medalist(s)	Ntando Mahlangu	South Africa	7.02	6.63	6.62	6.93	6.44	7.17	7.17	WR
2nd place, silver medalist(s)	Léon Schäfer	Germany	6.74	6.29	6.54	6.70	7.05	7.12	7.12	PR
3rd place, bronze medalist(s)	Daniel Wagner	Denmark	7.07	x	7.01	6.70	x	6.92	7.07	
4	Atsushi Yamamoto	Japan	6.62	6.38	6.41	x	6.75	6.60	6.70	AB
5	Ali Lacin	Germany	6.70	x	6.21	x	5.98	x	6.70	AR
6	Joël de Jong	Netherlands	6.41	6.34	6.30	5.85	6.32	x	6.41	
7	Junta Kosuda	Japan	5.34	5.76	5.57	5.78	5.89	5.95	5.95	PB
8	Ezra Frech	United States	5.63	5.78	x	5.85	x	x	5.85	
9	Puseletso Michael Mabote	South Africa	4.93	5.08	5.18	did not advance			5.18	AR
10	Regas Woods	United States	4.86	x	-	did not advance			4.86	

=== T64 ===
Records

Prior to this competition, the existing world, Paralympic, and area records were as follows:

World record	Markus Rehm (GER)	8.62	Bydgoszcz, Poland	1 June 2021
Paralympic record	Markus Rehm (GER)	8.21	Rio de Janeiro, Brazil	17 September 2016

Area	Distance (m)	Wind	Athlete	Nation
Africa	Vacant			
American	6.96	-0.3	Trenten Merrill	United States
Asia	6.24	+0.5	Koto Matayoshi	Japan
Europe	8.62 WR	+1.0	Markus Rehm	Germany
Oceania	5.33	+0.0	Record Mark	

Results

The final in this classification took place on 1 September 2021, at 20:25:

Rank	Athlete	Nationality	1	2	3	4	5	6	Best	Notes
1st place, gold medalist(s)	Markus Rehm	Germany	8.06	x	8.09	7.95	8.18	x	8.18	
2nd place, silver medalist(s)	Dimitri Pavade	France	7.23	7.39	x	6.43	5.47	6.50	7.39	PB
3rd place, bronze medalist(s)	Trenten Merrill	United States	6.89	x	6.92	7.08	x	x	7.08	AR
4	Stylianos Malakopoulos	Greece	6.50	6.99	7.04	6.86	6.69	6.83	7.04	=WR
5	Mpumelelo Mhlongo	South Africa	6.41	6.62	6.38	6.80	6.69	6.35	6.80	SB
6	Marco Cicchetti	Italy	6.08	6.38	6.44	6.66	6.50	6.48	6.66	
