= 2025 World Para Athletics Championships – Men's long jump =

The men's long jump events at the 2025 World Para Athletics Championships were held at the Jawaharlal Nehru Stadium, Delhi in New Delhi.

== Medalists ==
| Event | Gold | Silver | Bronze |
|---|---|---|---|
| T11 | Di Dongdong; China | Chen Shichang; China | Maksim Shavrikov; Neutral Paralympic Athletes |
| T12 | Fernando Vázquez; Argentina | Ihar Sauchuk; Neutral Paralympic Athletes | Andreas Walser; Germany |
| T13 | Iván Cano; Spain | Ryota Fukunaga; Japan | Vegard Dragsund Sverd; Norway |
| T20 | Abdul Latif Romly; Malaysia | Hassan Dawshi; Saudi Arabia | Matvei Iakushev; Neutral Paralympic Athletes |
| T36 | Evgenii Torsunov; Neutral Paralympic Athletes | William Stedman; New Zealand | Oleksandr Lytvynenko; Ukraine |
| T37 | Brian Lionel Impellizzeri; Argentina | Sergei Biriukov; Neutral Paralympic Athletes | Muhammad Nazmi Nasri; Malaysia |
| T38 | Bartosz Sienkiewicz; Poland | Juan Gómez Coa; Colombia | Zhong Huanghao; China |
| T44 | Marco Cicchetti; Italy | Dzmitry Bartashevich; Neutral Paralympic Athletes | Indika Gamage; Sri Lanka |
| T47 | Robiel Yankiel Sol Cervantes; Cuba | Nikita Kotukov; Neutral Paralympic Athletes | Wang Hao; China |
| T63 | Joel de Jong; Netherlands | Léon Schäfer; Germany | Daniel Wagner; Denmark |
| T64 | Markus Rehm; Germany | Derek Loccident; United States | Jarryd Wallace; United States |

== T11 ==
Final

The event took place on 27 September.

| Rank | Name | Nationality | Сlass | #1 | #2 | #3 | #4 | #5 | #6 | Result | Notes |
|---|---|---|---|---|---|---|---|---|---|---|---|
| 1st place, gold medalist(s) | Di Dongdong | China | T11 | 6.53 | 6.90 | – | 6.92 | 6.90 | 6.79 | 6.92 | WR |
| 2nd place, silver medalist(s) | Chen Shichang | China | T11 | 6.80 | 6.61 | x | – | 6.40 | 6.63 | 6.80 | PB |
| 3rd place, bronze medalist(s) | Maksim Shavrikov | Neutral Paralympic Athletes | T11 | 6.21 | x | x | 6.36 | 6.32 | 6.28 | 6.36 | SB |
| 4 | Ronan Pallier | France | T11 | 5.79 | 2.54 | 5.84 | 5.08 | x | x | 5.84 | |
| 5 | Ye Tao | China | T11 | – | x | x | x | 4.22 | x | 4.22 | SB |
| 6 | Eduardo Uceda Novas | Spain | T11 | 3.11 | r | | | | | 3.11 | |

== T12 ==
Final

The event took place on 30 September.

| Rank | Name | Nationality | Сlass | #1 | #2 | #3 | #4 | #5 | #6 | Result | Notes |
|---|---|---|---|---|---|---|---|---|---|---|---|
| 1st place, gold medalist(s) | Fernando Vázquez | Argentina | T12 | 6.53 | 6.74 | 6.79 | 6.88 | 6.96 | 7.01 | 7.01 | SB |
| 2nd place, silver medalist(s) | Ihar Sauchuk | Neutral Paralympic Athletes | T12 | 6.51 | 6.65 | 6.05 | 6.46 | 6.58 | 6.89 | 6.89 | PB |
| 3rd place, bronze medalist(s) | Andreas Walser | Germany | T12 | x | 6.81 | x | x | – | 6.64 | 6.81 | SB |
| 4 | Daiki Ishiyama | Japan | T12 | x | 6.24 | 6.34 | 6.22 | 6.50 | 6.58 | 6.58 | |
| 5 | Tobias Jonsson | Sweden | T12 | 6.17 | 6.26 | 2.15 | 5.99 | 6.01 | 6.22 | 6.26 | |
| 6 | Vishu | India | T12 | 6.11 | 6.24 | 6.17 | 6.14 | 6.18 | 6.09 | 6.24 | =PB |
| 7 | Enric Quintanilla Soriano | Spain | T12 | 5.83 | 5.51 | 6.03 | 5.70 | 5.84 | 5.82 | 6.03 | |
| | Alex Njeru | Kenya | T12 | DNS | | | | | | | |

== T13 ==
Final

The event took place on 1 October.

| Rank | Name | Nationality | Сlass | #1 | #2 | #3 | #4 | #5 | #6 | Result | Notes |
|---|---|---|---|---|---|---|---|---|---|---|---|
| 1st place, gold medalist(s) | Iván Cano | Spain | T13 | 6.40 | 6.68 | 6.89 | 6.70 | 7.11 | 7.05 | 7.11 | PB |
| 2nd place, silver medalist(s) | Ryota Fukunaga | Japan | T13 | x | 7.04 | x | 6.46 | 6.56 | 6.81 | 7.04 | |
| 3rd place, bronze medalist(s) | Vegard Dragsund Sverd | Norway | T13 | 6.42 | 6.88 | 6.41 | x | 4.17 | x | 6.88 | =PB |
| 4 | Zak Skinner | Great Britain | T13 | 6.80 | x | x | x | 6.42 | 5.01 | 6.80 | |
| 5 | Dzmitry Kaskevich | Neutral Paralympic Athletes | T13 | 6.68 | 6.67 | 6.49 | 6.19 | x | 6.77 | 6.77 | PB |
| 6 | Siarhei Burdukou | Neutral Paralympic Athletes | T13 | x | x | 5.88 | 6.30 | 6.47 | 6.32 | 6.47 | |
| 7 | Islam Salimov | Kazakhstan | T13 | x | x | 5.63 | x | 5.82 | 5.91 | 5.91 | SB |
| 8 | Wu Nung-pin | Chinese Taipei | T13 | x | 5.41 | 3.94 | x | 5.22 | 5.38 | 5.41 | |
| | Joan Sirera Molina | Spain | T13 | x | x | x | | | | NM | |

== T20 ==
Final

The event took place on 28 September.

| Rank | Name | Nationality | Сlass | #1 | #2 | #3 | #4 | #5 | #6 | Result | Notes |
|---|---|---|---|---|---|---|---|---|---|---|---|
| 1st place, gold medalist(s) | Abdul Latif Romly | Malaysia | T20 | 7.61 | 5.98 | 7.67 | 7.20 | x | 7.53 | 7.67 | WR |
| 2nd place, silver medalist(s) | Hassan Dawshi | Saudi Arabia | T20 | 7.20 | 7.14 | 7.36 | 6.91 | 7.19 | x | 7.36 | PB |
| 3rd place, bronze medalist(s) | Matvei Iakushev | Neutral Paralympic Athletes | T20 | x | x | 6.97 | 7.22 | 6.78 | 4.74 | 7.22 | SB |
| 4 | Roberto Carlos Chala Espinoza | Ecuador | T20 | 6.23 | 7.11 | 5.94 | x | x | 3.72 | 7.11 | PB |
| 5 | Muhammet Arif Cenesiz | Turkey | T20 | 6.64 | 6.55 | 6.67 | 6.80 | 6.82 | x | 6.82 | PB |
| 6 | Jhon Obando | Colombia | T20 | 6.81 | 4.77 | – | r | | | 6.81 | |
| 7 | Lenine Cunha | Portugal | T20 | x | 6.57 | 6.58 | 5.03 | 6.28 | x | 6.58 | |
| 8 | Tiago Ramos | Portugal | T20 | 6.53 | 6.35 | x | | | | 6.53 | |
| 9 | Mun Young-sik | South Korea | T20 | 6.09 | 6.53 | 4.94 | | | | 6.53 | PB |
| 10 | Noah Vucsics | Canada | T20 | x | 6.45 | x | | | | 6.45 | |
| 11 | Mattheo Gilbert-Galard | France | T20 | x | 6.31 | 6.26 | | | | 6.31 | PB |
| 12 | Eddy Capdor | Mauritius | T20 | x | 6.26 | 4.32 | | | | 6.26 | |
| 13 | Louis Denovan Jason Rabaye | Mauritius | T20 | x | 6.09 | 6.09 | | | | 6.09 | SB |
| 14 | Ronn-Russel Mitra | Philippines | T20 | x | 5.83 | 5.81 | | | | 5.83 | |
| | Athanasios Prodromou | Greece | T20 | x | x | x | x | x | x | NM | |

== T36 ==
Final

The event took place on 5 October.

| Rank | Name | Nationality | Сlass | #1 | #2 | #3 | #4 | #5 | #6 | Result | Notes |
|---|---|---|---|---|---|---|---|---|---|---|---|
| 1st place, gold medalist(s) | Evgenii Torsunov | Neutral Paralympic Athletes | T36 | 6.05 | 5.64 | 5.95 | 6.14 | 5.86 | x | 6.14 | WR |
| 2nd place, silver medalist(s) | William Stedman | New Zealand | T36 | x | 5.80 | 5.79 | 5.83 | 5.83 | 5.81 | 5.83 | SB |
| 3rd place, bronze medalist(s) | Oleksandr Lytvynenko | Ukraine | T36 | 5.66 | 5.57 | 5.61 | 5.76 | 5.81 | 5.62 | 5.81 | PB |
| 4 | Deng Peicheng | China | T36 | 5.73 | 5.43 | x | x | 5.61 | 5.11 | 5.73 | PB |
| 5 | Aser Ramos | Brazil | T36 | 5.70 | x | 5.49 | 5.64 | x | 5.58 | 5.70 | |
| 6 | Izzat Turgunov | Uzbekistan | T36 | x | x | 5.49 | 5.64 | 5.46 | x | 5.64 | SB |
| 7 | Yang Yifei | China | T36 | 5.17 | 5.45 | 5.19 | 5.28 | 5.54 | 5.56 | 5.56 | SB |
| 8 | Kirill Glazyrin | Neutral Paralympic Athletes | T36 | 5.31 | 4.64 | 5.53 | 5.27 | 5.25 | 5.45 | 5.53 | SB |
| 9 | Mokhtar Didane | Algeria | T36 | 5.35 | 4.99 | 5.23 | | | | 5.35 | SB |
| 10 | Taha Al-Harrasi | Oman | T36 | x | 5.14 | 5.09 | | | | 5.14 | |

== T37 ==
Final

The event took place on 3 October.

| Rank | Name | Nationality | Сlass | #1 | #2 | #3 | #4 | #5 | #6 | Result | Notes |
|---|---|---|---|---|---|---|---|---|---|---|---|
| 1st place, gold medalist(s) | Brian Lionel Impellizzeri | Argentina | T37 | 6.47 | 6.63 | 6.52 | x | x | 6.61 | 6.63 | CR |
| 2nd place, silver medalist(s) | Sergei Biriukov | Neutral Paralympic Athletes | T37 | 6.34 | x | 6.43 | x | 6.17 | 6.19 | 6.43 | PB |
| 3rd place, bronze medalist(s) | Muhammad Nazmi Nasri | Malaysia | T37 | x | 6.28 | 6.35 | x | 6.15 | 6.31 | 6.35 | PB |
| 4 | Ali Olfatnia | Iran | T37 | x | 6.23 | x | 6.10 | 6.31 | 6.35 | 6.35 | PB |
| 5 | Mateus Evangelista Cardoso | Brazil | T37 | 5.86 | x | 6.21 | 6.30 | x | x | 6.30 | SB |
| 6 | Vladyslav Zahrebelnyi | Ukraine | T37 | 6.12 | 6.22 | 6.10 | 5.93 | x | 5.91 | 6.22 | SB |
| 7 | Viktoras Pentaras | Cyprus | T37 | 5.97 | x | x | x | x | 6.22 | 6.22 | PB |
| 8 | Samson Opiyo | Kenya | T37 | 5.48 | 5.89 | 5.64 | 5.74 | x | x | 5.89 | SB |
| 9 | Konstantinos Kamaras | Greece | T37 | x | 5.85 | x | | | | 5.85 | |
| 10 | Chermen Kobesov | Neutral Paralympic Athletes | T37 | x | 5.61 | 5.71 | | | | 5.71 | |
| 11 | Jesse Zesseu | Canada | T37 | x | x | 5.65 | | | | 5.65 | SB |
| 12 | Doston Kahhorov | Uzbekistan | T37 | 5.62 | 5.62 | 5.25 | | | | 5.62 | PB |
| 13 | Sodikjon Mamadiev | Uzbekistan | T37 | 5.17 | x | 5.14 | | | | 5.17 | SB |
| 14 | Luis Carlos Segura Sánchez | Spain | T37 | x | 4.79 | x | | | | 4.79 | |

== T38 ==
Final

The event took place on 2 October.

| Rank | Name | Nationality | Сlass | #1 | #2 | #3 | #4 | #5 | #6 | Result | Notes |
|---|---|---|---|---|---|---|---|---|---|---|---|
| 1st place, gold medalist(s) | Bartosz Sienkiewicz | Poland | T38 | 6.74 | x | 6.56 | 6.12 | 6.61 | 6.35 | 6.74 | |
| 2nd place, silver medalist(s) | Juan Gómez Coa | Colombia | T38 | x | x | 6.37 | 6.55 | x | 6.48 | 6.55 | |
| 3rd place, bronze medalist(s) | Zhong Huanghao | China | T38 | 6.53 | 5.22 | 6.41 | x | 6.46 | 6.34 | 6.53 | SB |
| 4 | Nick Mayhugh | United States | T38 | x | 6.41 | x | 6.40 | x | 6.15 | 6.41 | PB |
| 5 | Ryan Medrano | United States | T38 | x | 6.07 | 5.97 | 5.79 | x | 6.40 | 6.40 | PB |
| 6 | Michael Mayne | Australia | T38 | 4.83 | 6.33 | 5.80 | 6.04 | 6.10 | 6.25 | 6.33 | OC |
| 7 | Khetag Khinchagov | Neutral Paralympic Athletes | T38 | 6.11 | 6.22 | x | x | 5.97 | 6.07 | 6.22 | SB |
| 8 | Elijah Thommen | Switzerland | T38 | x | 6.03 | 5.93 | x | x | x | 6.03 | |
| 9 | Ari Gesini | Australia | T38 | 5.80 | 5.90 | x | | | | 5.90 | |
| 10 | Mitchell Prosper | Mauritius | T38 | 5.83 | 5.85 | 5.62 | | | | 5.85 | |
| 11 | Mehmet Atalay | Turkey | T38 | x | 4.89 | 4.87 | | | | 4.89 | PB |
| 12 | Jose Rafael Ramos Rodriguez | Puerto Rico | T38 | x | x | 4.73 | | | | 4.73 | |

== T44 ==
Final

The event took place on 2 October.

| Rank | Name | Nationality | Сlass | #1 | #2 | #3 | #4 | #5 | #6 | Result | Notes |
|---|---|---|---|---|---|---|---|---|---|---|---|
| 1st place, gold medalist(s) | Marco Cicchetti | Italy | T44 | 6.54 | 6.81 | 6.98 | 6.93 | 6.98 | 6.97 | 6.98 | ER |
| 2nd place, silver medalist(s) | Dzmitry Bartashevich | Neutral Paralympic Athletes | T44 | x | 6.90 | 6.85 | x | – | x | 6.90 | PB |
| 3rd place, bronze medalist(s) | Indika Gamage | Sri Lanka | T44 | x | 6.45 | 6.46 | 6.32 | x | x | 6.46 | SB |
| 4 | Romildo Pereira Santos | Brazil | T44 | x | 6.42 | x | x | 6.38 | 6.24 | 6.42 | |
| 5 | Mit Bharatbhai Patel | India | T44 | 5.96 | 6.20 | 6.28 | 5.98 | 5.97 | x | 6.28 | PB |
| 6 | Unni Renu | India | T44 | x | 5.78 | 5.96 | r | | | 5.96 | PB |
| 7 | Zeng Yize | China | T44 | 5.81 | x | 5.77 | – | 5.30 | 5.45 | 5.81 | |
| 8 | Pardeep | India | T44 | x | x | 5.26 | x | 5.30 | x | 5.30 | |
| | Loic Wandji Ngono | Cameroon | T44 | DNS | | | | | | | |

== T47 ==
Final

The event took place on 28 September.

| Rank | Name | Nationality | Сlass | #1 | #2 | #3 | #4 | #5 | #6 | Result | Notes |
|---|---|---|---|---|---|---|---|---|---|---|---|
| 1st place, gold medalist(s) | Robiel Yankiel Sol Cervantes | Cuba | T46 | 7.57 | x | 5.28 | x | x | 3.35 | 7.57 | |
| 2nd place, silver medalist(s) | Nikita Kotukov | Neutral Paralympic Athletes | T47 | x | 6.68 | 7.21 | 5.28 | x | 7.12 | 7.21 | SB |
| 3rd place, bronze medalist(s) | Wang Hao | China | T46 | 7.19 | 7.01 | 6.93 | 7.19 | 7.00 | 6.84 | 7.19 | SB |
| 4 | Omadbek Khasanov | Uzbekistan | T46 | 7.07 | 6.99 | x | 7.10 | 6.90 | x | 7.10 | SB |
| 5 | Nemanja Matijašević | Serbia | T47 | x | x | 6.84 | 6.96 | x | 6.96 | 6.96 | SB |
| 6 | Vikas | India | T47 | 6.44 | x | 6.69 | 6.84 | 6.88 | 6.96 | 6.96 | |
| 7 | Buddika Fernando | Sri Lanka | T47 | x | 6.60 | x | 6.70 | x | 6.62 | 6.70 | PB |
| 8 | Abdulrhman Yusuf Shabib Mahmoud | Egypt | T46 | 6.44 | 6.61 | 6.65 | 6.57 | x | 6.66 | 6.66 | SB |
| 9 | Robert Kiprotich | Kenya | T47 | x | 6.50 | 6.49 | | | | 6.50 | SB |
| 10 | Ajay Singh | India | T47 | x | 6.31 | 6.21 | | | | 6.31 | SB |
| 11 | Vincent Kiprono Mutai | Kenya | T46 | 5.97 | 6.29 | x | | | | 6.29 | |
| 12 | Pere Antoni Gomila | Spain | T47 | 6.14 | x | 6.02 | | | | 6.14 | |
| | Abraham Viltre Herrera | Cuba | T46 | x | x | x | | | | NM | |

== T63 ==
Final

The event took place on 29 September.

| Rank | Name | Nationality | Сlass | #1 | #2 | #3 | #4 | #5 | #6 | Result | Notes |
|---|---|---|---|---|---|---|---|---|---|---|---|
| 1st place, gold medalist(s) | Joel de Jong | Netherlands | T63 | 7.57 | 7.55 | x | x | 7.01 | 7.37 | 7.57 | CR |
| 2nd place, silver medalist(s) | Léon Schäfer | Germany | T63 | 7.15 | 7.15 | x | 7.38 | 4.19 | 7.45 | 7.45 | PB |
| 3rd place, bronze medalist(s) | Daniel Wagner | Denmark | T63 | x | 7.20 | x | x | 7.20 | x | 7.20 | SB |
| 4 | Puseletso Mabote | South Africa | T63 | 7.00 | x | x | 7.01 | x | x | 7.01 | AF |
| 5 | Ezra Frech | United States | T63 | x | 6.21 | 6.71 | x | x | 6.98 | 6.98 | SB |
| 6 | Hamza Güleç | Turkey | T61 | x | x | 6.63 | x | 6.15 | x | 6.63 | CR |
| 7 | Luke Sinnott | Great Britain | T61 | 6.02 | 6.40 | x | 6.17 | 5.99 | 6.41 | 6.41 | |
| 8 | Hajime Kondo | Japan | T63 | 6.00 | 6.32 | 6.35 | 6.00 | x | x | 6.35 | |
| 9 | Noah Mbuyamba | Netherlands | T63 | x | x | 6.34 | | | | 6.34 | |
| 10 | Kantinan Khumphong | Thailand | T63 | 5.59 | 5.89 | x | | | | 5.89 | PB |
| 11 | Georgios Anyfantis | Greece | T63 | 5.70 | x | x | | | | 5.70 | |
| | Desmond Jackson | United States | T63 | x | x | x | | | | NM | |
| | Mahendra Gurjar | India | T42 | x | x | x | | | | NM | |

== T64 ==
Final

The event took place on 3 October.

| Rank | Name | Nationality | Сlass | #1 | #2 | #3 | #4 | #5 | #6 | Result | Notes |
|---|---|---|---|---|---|---|---|---|---|---|---|
| 1st place, gold medalist(s) | Markus Rehm | Germany | T64 | 8.38 | 8.43 | 8.28 | 8.09 | x | x | 8.43 | CR |
| 2nd place, silver medalist(s) | Derek Loccident | United States | T64 | 8.16 | 8.21 | 6.02 | 7.88 | x | x | 8.21 | AM |
| 3rd place, bronze medalist(s) | Jarryd Wallace | United States | T64 | x | 6.83 | x | 7.38 | 7.65 | x | 7.65 | SB |
| 4 | Dimitri Pavadé | France | T64 | x | 6.85 | 7.22 | 7.36 | 7.58 | 7.48 | 7.58 | SB |
| 5 | Trenten Merrill | United States | T64 | 6.60 | x | 7.24 | 7.13 | x | 7.53 | 7.53 | SB |
| 6 | Petr Mikhalkov | Neutral Paralympic Athletes | T64 | 7.17 | 7.13 | 7.34 | 7.36 | 7.28 | x | 7.36 | PB |
| 7 | Solairaj Dharmaraj | India | T64 | x | 6.89 | x | 6.90 | 7.08 | 7.02 | 7.08 | AS |
