= Athletics at the 2016 Summer Paralympics – Men's 100 metres T42 =

Men's 100 metres T42 at the XV Paralympic Games
- Venue: Estádio Olímpico João Havelange
- Dates: 14–15 September 2016
- Competitors: 14 from 9 nations

Medalists
1st place, gold medalist(s)		Scott Reardon	Australia
2nd place, silver medalist(s)		Daniel Wagner	Denmark
2nd place, silver medalist(s)		Richard Whitehead	Great Britain

The T42 category is for single above-knee amputees and athletes with other impairments that are comparable to a single above knee amputation, including athletes with loss of muscle power in the lower limbs.

The Athletics at the 2016 Summer Paralympics – Men's 100 metres T42 event at the 2016 Paralympic Games took place on 14–15 September 2016, at the Estádio Olímpico João Havelange.

== Heats ==
=== Heat 1 ===
12:44 14 September 2016:

Rank	Lane	Bib	Name	Nationality	Reaction	Time	Notes
1	3	1543	Heinrich Popow	Germany		12.45	Q
2	5	1382	Daniel Wagner	Denmark		12.47	Q
3	7	2164	Anil Prasanna Jayalath Yodha Pedige	Sri Lanka		12.85	Q
4	2	2360	Desmond Jackson	United States		12.95	
5	6	1507	David Henson	Great Britain		13.23	
6	4	2381	Shaquille Vance	United States		13.27	
7	8	1993	Carlos Felipa	Peru		15.38	

=== Heat 2 ===
12:50 14 September 2016:

Rank	Lane	Bib	Name	Nationality	Reaction	Time	Notes
1	4	1061	Scott Reardon	Australia		12.26	Q
2	8	1524	Richard Whitehead	Great Britain		12.38	Q
3	7	2085	Ntando Mahlangu	South Africa		12.70	Q
4	2	2151	Upul Indika Chuladasa Abarana Gedara	Sri Lanka		12.76	q
5	3	1748	Atsushi Yamamoto	Japan		12.87	q
6	5	2387	Regas Woods	United States		13.06	
7	6	1546	Leon Schaefer	Germany		13.16	

== Final ==
18:17 15 September 2016:

Rank	Lane	Bib	Name	Nationality	Reaction	Time	Notes
1st place, gold medalist(s)	4	1061	Scott Reardon	Australia		12.26	
2nd place, silver medalist(s)	6	1382	Daniel Wagner	Denmark		12.32	
2nd place, silver medalist(s)	5	1524	Richard Whitehead	Great Britain		12.32	
4	7	1543	Heinrich Popow	Germany		12.46	
5	9	2085	Ntando Mahlangu	South Africa		12.57	
6	8	2164	Anil Prasanna Jayalath Yodha Pedige	Sri Lanka		12.81	
7	2	1748	Atsushi Yamamoto	Japan		12.84	
8	3	2151	Upul Indika Chuladasa Abarana Gedara	Sri Lanka		12.85	
