= David Henson =

British Paralympic athlete (born 1984)

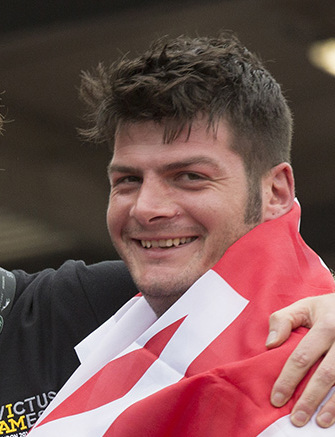
- Henson at the 2014 Invictus Games

Personal information
- Nationality: British
- Born: 15 September 1984 (age 41) Southampton, England

Sport
- Country: Great Britain
- Sport: Track and field
- Disability: limb deficiency
- Disability class: T42
- Event: Sprints
- Club: Southampton Athletic Club
- Coached by: Paula Dunn (national); Roger Keller (personal)

Achievements and titles
- World finals: 2015
Medal record
Men's athletics
Representing Great Britain
Summer Paralympics
Bronze medal – third place	2016 Rio	200 m T42
IPC World Championships
Bronze medal – third place	2017 London	200 m T42
IPC European Championships
Silver medal – second place	2016 Grosseto	200 m T42

David Henson, MBE (born 15 September 1984) is a British parasport athlete competing mainly in T42 classification sprint events. He has represented Britain at the Invictus Games, World and European Championships and in 2016 he was selected for the Summer Paralympics in Rio, winning a bronze medal in the 200m sprint (T42).

== Personal history ==
Henson was born in Southampton, England in 1984. He was educated at St George Catholic College in Southampton before going to University of Hertfordshire to study mechanical engineering. After leaving university he joined the Royal Military Academy Sandhurst to undertake his initial training as an Army officer. He passed out of Sandhurst in 2008, joining the 22 Engineer Regiment as Second Lieutenant.

In February 2010 Henson was moved to the bomb disposal unit of the Royal Engineers, before being deployed to Afghanistan in October. In Afghanistan part of his duties included the leadership of a detachment force clearing improvised explosive devices (IED). On 13 February 2011, Henson and his unit were clearing two compounds in the Nad-e Ali South area of Helmand Province when he stood on a hidden IED. Within 37 minutes of the incident he was on the operating table in Camp Bastion, before being flown back to England to receive treatment in Birmingham the following day. Following these life saving operations, Henson had his right leg amputated above the knee and his left leg amputated through the knee. This was followed by further operations and an extensive rehabilitation program at Defence Medical Rehabilitation Centre at Headley Court, but within eight months he had been fitted with prosthetic legs and was walking again.

Henson returned to education after his injuries and took a master's degree in Biomedical Engineering at Imperial College London, focusing on amputee biomechanics for the improvement of prosthetic limbs. Henson continued his studies at Imperial College London in the Department of Bioengineering and was awarded a PhD in amputee biomechanics in 2020 (https://doi.org/10.25560/86604).

Henson and his wife, Hayley, have three daughters. In 2014 he was awarded the MBE.

== Sports career ==
During his rehabilitation, Henson found a passion for sport. He began taking part in open swim events for charity, he also participated in Wheelchair basketball and sitting volleyball. In 2012 he was selected to be captain of the British team in the inaugural Invictus Games. He entered three events, the sitting volleyball and the 100m and 200m ambulant IT2 sprints, winning gold in the 200m.

After the Invictus Games, Henson continued to train as a parasport athlete under the guidance of Roger Keller. In 2015 he was selected to represent the Great Britain team at the IPC Athletics European Championships in Doha, competing in the 200 metres sprint. Although he did not medal at the games he was given the honour of being the flag bearer for the opening ceremony.

The following year, in the build-up to the Rio Paralympics Henson travelled to Grosseto in Italy to compete for Britain at the 2016 IPC Athletics European Championships. He competed in both the 100m and 200m T42 events, taking the silver in the 200m, behind teammate Richard Whitehead, in a time of 25.89s. In July 2016 Henson again faced Whitehead at the London Grand Prix, finishing third with a new personal best of 25.05. A few days later, on 26 July, it was confirmed that he has made the Great Britain team for the 2016 Summer Paralympics.

At the 2016 Paralympic Games in Rio, Henson entered both the 100m and 200m sprints. In the heats of the 200m sprint he temporarily lost balance on his running blades, slipping into an outside track. Fortunately for Henson he did not impeded the other competitors and was able to recover and qualify for the final. The final saw Henson win a Paralympic bronze, after coming from the back of the field in the final 50 metres to power through the field to finish behind fellow British teammate Whitehead and South Africa's Ntando Mahlangu. In the 100 metres, as a double amputee, Henson was unable to hit his full pace, and finished fifth in the heats, failing to make the final.
