= 2018 World Para Athletics European Championships – Men's long jump =

The men's long jump at the 2018 World Para Athletics European Championships was held at the Friedrich-Ludwig-Jahn-Sportpark in Berlin from 20 to 26 August.

== Medalists ==
Event	Gold		Silver		Bronze	
T11	Gerard Descarrega Puigdevall (ESP)	6.37 CR	Ronan Pallier (FRA)	6.16	Xavier Porras (ESP)	6.09
T12	Siarhei Burdukou (BLR)	7.11 CR	Tobias Jonsson (SWE)	6.89	Thomas Ulbricht (GER)	6.43
T13	Ivan Cano Blanco (ESP)	6.77	Zak Skinner (GBR)	6.72	Radoslav Zlatanov (BUL)	6.62
T20	Zoran Talić (CRO)	7.28 CR	Dmytro Prudnikov (UKR)	7.15	Ranki Oberoi (NED)	7.13
T36	Oleksandr Lytvynenko (UKR)	5.48 CR	Roman Pavlyk (UKR)	5.24	no medal awarded	
T37	Vladyslav Zahrebelnyi (UKR)	6.25 CR	Mateusz Owczarek (POL)	6.23	Moussa Tambadou (FRA)	5.86
T38 (non-medal event)	Mykyta Senyk (UKR)	6.45				
T47	Antoan Bozhilov (BUL)	6.62	Nemanja Matijasevic (SRB)	6.42	Carlos Javier Perez Hernandez (ESP)	6.22
T63	Daniel Wagner (GER)	6.72 CR	Heinrich Popow (GER)	6.24	Marco Pentagoni (ITA)	5.89
T64	Markus Rehm (GER)	8.48 WR	Felix Streng (GER)	7.71	Jean-Baptiste Alaize (FRA)	7.20
WR world record | AR area record | CR championship record | GR games record | NR national record | OR Olympic record | PB personal best | SB season best | WL world leading (in a given season)

== See also ==
- List of IPC world records in athletics
