= 2015 IPC Athletics World Championships – Men's triple jump =

The men's triple jump at the 2015 IPC Athletics World Championships was held at the Suheim Bin Hamad Stadium in Doha from 22 to 31 October.

== Medalists ==
Event	Gold		Silver		Bronze	
T20	Lenine Cunha; Portugal	14.16 PB	Evangelos Kanavos; Greece	13.50 PB	Ranki Oberoi; Netherlands	13.48
T47	Liu Fuliang (T47); China	15.29 WR	Roderick Townsend-Roberts (T46); United States	14.49 AR	Georgios Kostakis (T46); Greece	13.89
WR world record | AR area record | CR championship record | GR games record | NR national record | OR Olympic record | PB personal best | SB season best | WL world leading (in a given season)

== See also ==
- List of IPC world records in athletics
