= 2017 World Para Athletics Championships – Men's 200 metres =

The men's 200 metres at the 2017 World Para Athletics Championships was held at the Olympic Stadium in London from 14 to 23 July.

== Medalists ==
Event	Gold		Silver		Bronze	
T11	Fan Zetan; Guide: Huang Zhihui; China	23.28	David Brown; Guide: Jerome Avery; United States	23.35	di Dongdong; Guide: Mao Deyi; China	23.77
T12	Mahdi Afri; Morocco	22.39	Joan Munar Martínez; Spain	22.60	Luis Goncalves; Portugal	22.78 SB
T13	Jason Smyth; Ireland	21.40 SB	Johannes Nambala; Namibia	21.81	Mateusz Michalski; Poland	21.86 PB
T34	Walid Ktila; Tunisia	27.14 CR	Mohamed Hammadi; United Arab Emirates	27.81	Rheed McCracken; Australia	27.81 AR
T35	Ihor Tsvietov; Ukraine	25.52	Hernan Barreto; Argentina	26.35 SB	Fábio da Silva Bordignon; Brazil	26.94
T36	James Turner; Australia	24.09 WR	Krzysztof Ciuksza; Poland	25.04	Rodrigo Parreira da Silva; Brazil	25.19 AR
T37	Charl du Toit; South Africa	23.27 SB	Mateus Evangelista Cardoso; Brazil	23.41	Sofiane Hamdi; Algeria	23.94 SB
T38	Dyan Buis; South Africa	22.67 SB	Hu Jianwen; China	22.69 PB	Dixon De Jesus Hooker Velasquez; Colombia	22.91 AR
T42	Richard Whitehead; Great Britain	23.26 CR	Ntando Mahlangu; South Africa	23.95 SB	David Henson; Great Britain	24.73 SB
T43	Johannes Floors; Germany	21.50 CR	Hunter Woodhall; United States	21.72	Nick Rogers; United States	21.88
T44	Jarryd Wallace; United States	22.37	Michail Seitis; Greece	22.53	Arnu Fourie; South Africa	22.53
T47	Petrucio Ferreira dos Santos; Brazil	21.21 WR	Yohansson Nascimento; Brazil	21.96 SB	Michal Derus; Poland	22.08 SB
T53	Brent Lakatos; Canada	25.29 CR	Pongsakorn Paeyo; Thailand	25.29 =CR	Pierre Fairbank; France	26.01
T54	Yassine Gharbi; Tunisia	24.86 CR	Kenny van Weeghel; Netherlands	24.92	Leo-Pekka Tähti; Finland	25.05
WR world record | AR area record | CR championship record | GR games record | NR national record | OR Olympic record | PB personal best | SB season best | WL world leading (in a given season)

Events listed in pink were contested but no medals were awarded.

== See also ==
- List of IPC world records in athletics
