= Bartosz Sienkiewicz =

Polish para athlete (born 2001)

Personal information
- Nationality: Polish
- Born: 19 January 2001 (age 25)

Sport
- Sport: Para-athletics
- Disability class: T38
Medal record
Men's para-athletics
Representing Poland
World Championships
| Gold medal – first place | 2025 New Delhi | Long jump T38 |

Bartosz Sienkiewicz (born 19 January 2001) is a Polish T38 para athlete.

== Career ==
Sienkiewicz competed at the 2025 World Para Athletics Championships and won a gold medal in the long jump T38 event with a jump of 6.74 metres. He also competed in the 100 metres T38 event and set a European record during the heats with a time of 10.87 seconds. During the finals he finished in sixth place with a time of 11.10 seconds.
