= Andreas Walser (athlete) =

German para athlete (born 1996)

Personal information
- Nationality: German
- Born: 9 January 1996 (age 30) Augsburg, Germany

Sport
- Sport: Para-athletics
- Disability: Retinitis pigmentosa
- Disability class: T12
Medal record
Men's para-athletics
Representing Germany
World Championships
Bronze medal – third place	2025 New Delhi	Long jump T12

Andreas Walser (born 9 January 1996) is a German visually impaired para athlete who specializes in long jump. He represented Germany at the 2024 Summer Paralympics.

== Early life ==
Walser grew up playing soccer and American football before being diagnosed with retinitis pigmentosa.

== Career ==
He represented Germany at the 2024 Summer Paralympics and finished in sixth place in the long jump T12 event. He competed at the 2025 World Para Athletics Championships and won a bronze medal in the long jump T12 event.
