= Athletics at the 2015 Parapan American Games – Men's 200 metres T37 =

Athletics – Men's 200 metres T37 at the 2015 Parapan American Games
- Venue: CIBC Athletics Stadium
- Dates: August 14
- Competitors: 5 from 3 nations

Medalists
1st place, gold medalist(s)		Mateus Evangelista Cardoso	Brazil
2nd place, silver medalist(s)		Omar Monterola	Venezuela
3rd place, bronze medalist(s)		Paulo Pereira	Brazil

The men's T37 200 metres competition of the athletics events at the 2015 Parapan American Games was held on August 14 at the CIBC Athletics Stadium. The defending Parapan American Games champion was Omar Monterola of Venezuela.

== Records ==
Prior to this competition, the existing records were as follows:

World record	Andrey Vdovin (RUS)	22.77	Lyon, France	24 July 2013
Americas record	Omar Monterola (VEN)	23.34	London, Great Britain	31 August 2012
Parapan record	Omar Monterola (VEN)	23.70	Guadalajara, Mexico	18 November 2011

== Schedule ==
All times are Central Standard Time (UTC-6).

Date	Time	Round
10 August	15:55	Final

== Results ==
All times are shown in seconds.

KEY:	q	Fastest non-qualifiers	Q	Qualified	PR	Parapan American Games record	AR	Area record	NR	National record	PB	Personal best	SB	Seasonal best	DSQ	Disqualified	FS	False start

=== Final ===
Wind: -0.5 m/s

Rank	Name	Nation	Time	Notes
1st place, gold medalist(s)	Mateus Evangelista Cardoso	Brazil	24.02	PB
2nd place, silver medalist(s)	Omar Monterola	Venezuela	24.20	SB
3rd place, bronze medalist(s)	Paulo Pereira	Brazil	24.70	
4	Lucas Ferrari	Brazil	25.33	PB
5	Oscar Fabian Riveros Amaya	Colombia	26.38	
