= Athletics at the 2015 Parapan American Games – Men's 100 metres T37 =

Athletics – Men's 100 metres T37 at the 2015 Parapan American Games
- Venue: CIBC Athletics Stadium
- Dates: August 11
- Competitors: 7 from 6 nations

Medalists
1st place, gold medalist(s)		Mateus Evangelista Cardoso	Brazil
2nd place, silver medalist(s)		Lucas Ferrari	Brazil
3rd place, bronze medalist(s)		Omar Monterola	Venezuela

The men's T37 100 metres competition of the athletics events at the 2015 Parapan American Games was held on August 11 at the CIBC Athletics Stadium. The defending Parapan American Games champion was Omar Monterola of Venezuela.

== Records ==
Prior to this competition, the existing records were as follows:

World record	Andrey Vdovin (RUS)	11.48	Lyon, France	22 July 2013
Americas Record	Omar Monterola (VEN)	11.68	London, Great Britain	8 September 2012
Parapan Am Record	Omar Monterola (VEN)	11.74	Guadalajara, Mexico	15 November 2011

== Schedule ==
All times are Central Standard Time (UTC-6).

Date	Time	Round
11 August	18:12	Final

== Results ==
All times are shown in seconds.

KEY:	q	Fastest non-qualifiers	Q	Qualified	PR	Parapan American Games record	AR	Area record	NR	National record	PB	Personal best	SB	Seasonal best	DSQ	Disqualified	FS	False start

=== Final ===
Wind +3.1 m/s

Rank	Name	Nation	Time	Notes
1st place, gold medalist(s)	Mateus Evangelista Cardoso	Brazil	11.64	
2nd place, silver medalist(s)	Lucas Ferrari	Brazil	11.86	
3rd place, bronze medalist(s)	Omar Monterola	Venezuela	12.01	
4	Daniel Tataren	Argentina	12.18	
5	Ahkeel Whitehead	United States	12.36	
6	Benjamin Cardozo	Mexico	12.91	
7	Oscar Fabian Riveros Amaya	Colombia	13.03	
