= Sverd =

Sverð is the Old Norse term for "sword". It may refer to

- the Viking Sword.
- the stage name of Steinar Sverd Johnsen
- Vegard Dragsund Sverd (born 1999), Norwegian para-athlete
