= Athletics at the 2016 Summer Paralympics – Men's 200 metres T42 =

Men's 200 metres T42 at the XV Paralympic Games
- Venue: Estádio Olímpico João Havelange
- Dates: 10–11 September 2016
- Competitors: 9 from 5 nations

Medalists
1st place, gold medalist(s)		Richard Whitehead	Great Britain
2nd place, silver medalist(s)		Ntando Mahlangu	South Africa
3rd place, bronze medalist(s)		David Henson	Great Britain

The T42 category is for single above-knee amputees and athletes with other impairments that are comparable to a single above knee amputation, including athletes with loss of muscle power in the lower limbs.

The Athletics at the 2016 Summer Paralympics – Men's 200 metres T42 event at the 2016 Paralympic Games took place on 10–11 September 2016, at the Estádio Olímpico João Havelange.

== Heats ==
=== Heat 1 ===
18:18 10 September 2016:

Rank	Lane	Bib	Name	Nationality	Reaction	Time	Notes
1	6	1524	Richard Whitehead	Great Britain		23.07	Q
2	3	2381	Shaquille Vance	United States		24.65	Q
3	7	1382	Daniel Wagner	Denmark		25.26	Q
4	4	2164	Anil Prasanna Jayalath Yodha Pedige	Sri Lanka		25.95	q
	5	2360	Desmond Jackson	United States			DSQ

=== Heat 2 ===
18:24 10 September 2016:

Rank	Lane	Bib	Name	Nationality	Reaction	Time	Notes
1	5	2085	Ntando Mahlangu	South Africa		24.15	Q
2	6	2387	Regas Woods	United States		25.19	Q
3	3	1507	David Henson	Great Britain		25.26	Q
4	4	2151	Upul Indika Chuladasa Abarana Gedara	Sri Lanka		26.34	q

== Final ==
19:08 11 September 2016:

Rank	Lane	Bib	Name	Nationality	Reaction	Time	Notes
1st place, gold medalist(s)	6	1524	Richard Whitehead	Great Britain		23.39	
2nd place, silver medalist(s)	4	2085	Ntando Mahlangu	South Africa		23.77	
3rd place, bronze medalist(s)	7	1507	David Henson	Great Britain		24.74	
4	3	2381	Shaquille Vance	United States		24.86	
5	8	1382	Daniel Wagner	Denmark		25.20	
6	5	2387	Regas Woods	United States		25.27	
7	2	2164	Anil Prasanna Jayalath Yodha Pedige	Sri Lanka		25.96	
8	1	2151	Upul Indika Chuladasa Abarana Gedara	Sri Lanka		26.68	
