= Hassan Dawshi =

Saudi Arabian para athlete (born 1991)

Personal information
- Nationality: Saudi Arabian
- Born: 6 June 1991 (age 35)

Sport
- Sport: Para-athletics
- Disability class: T20
- Event: long jump
Medal record
Men's para-athletics
Representing Saudi Arabia
World Championships
Silver medal – second place	2025 New Delhi	Long jump T20
Asian Para Games
Silver medal – second place	2022 Hangzhou	Long jump T20

Hassan Dawshi (born 6 June 1991) is a Saudi Arabian para-athlete specializing in long jump. He represented Saudi Arabia at the 2020 and 2024 Summer Paralympics.

== Career ==
Dawshi represented Saudi Arabia at the 2020 Summer Paralympics and finished in sixth place in the long jump T20 event. He again represented Saudi Arabia at the 2024 Summer Paralympics and finished in fourth place in the long jump T20 event with a personal best jump of 7.31 metres. He competed at the 2025 World Para Athletics Championships and won a silver medal in the long jump T20 event.
