= Brian Lionel Impellizzeri =

Argentine Paralympic athlete

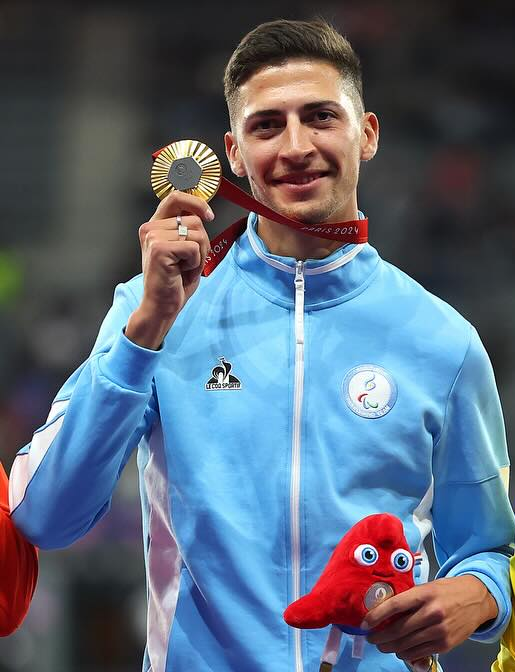
- Impellizzeri at the 2024 Summer Paralympics

Personal information
- Nationality: Argentinian
- Born: 30 July 1998 (age 27) Rosario, Santa Fe, Argentina

Sport
- Sport: Paralympic athletics
- Disability: Cerebral palsy
- Disability class: T37
- Coached by: Martin Arroyo
Medal record
Men's para-athletics
Representing Argentina
Paralympic Games
Gold medal – first place	2024 Paris	Long jump T37
Silver medal – second place	2020 Tokyo	Long jump T37
World Championships
Gold medal – first place	2023 Paris	Long jump T37
Gold medal – first place	2025 New Delhi	Long jump T37
Parapan American Games
Gold medal – first place	2023 Santiago	Long jump T37/38

Brian Lionel Impellizzeri (born 30 July 1998) is an Argentine Paralympic athlete who competes in the T37 category. He represented Argentina at the 2020 and 2024 Summer Paralympics.

== Career ==
Impellizzeri represented Argentina in the long jump T37 event at the 2020 Summer Paralympics and won a silver medal.

Impellizzeri won the gold medal in the men's long jump T37 event at the 2023 World Para Athletics Championships held in Paris, France.
