= Marko Cheseto =

Kenyan athlete

Personal information
- Nationality: Kenyan
- Born: 1982 or 1983 (age 43–44) Kapenguria, Kenya
- Height: 1.85 m (6 ft 1 in)
- Weight: 70 kg (150 lb)

Sport
- Sport: Track and field
- Events: Cross country running, marathon
- College team: University of Alaska Anchorage

Marko Cheseto is a Kenyan All-American athlete in track and field and cross country running. In 2019 he set a world record for a marathon by a double amputee.

== Biography ==
Cheseto was born in Kapenguria, Kenya to Dickson, a local farmer. He is the third oldest of 11 children. Cheseto was raised in the village of Ptop, in the western Kenyan mountains. In 2006, he graduated from a two-year college in Nairobi and started working as a teacher.

Being always interested in running, Cheseto enrolled in a running academy in Eldoret, and started training twice daily. He had moderate success in local races, which raised the interest of American college recruiters. Michael Friess, the track and cross-country coach at the University of Alaska Anchorage who already had Kenyan David Kiplagat in his roster, offered Marko a full scholarship.

Although his parents were reluctant at first, they sold farm animals and raised money to cover the travel expenses. In August 2008, Cheseto traveled to Anchorage, Alaska, along with fellow Kenyan Alfred Kangogo. Cheseto decided to major in nursing and nutrition, while being part of the track and field team. Cheseto also began working at the university sports complex.

That same year, Cheseto won first place in the Great Northwest Athletic Conference. He repeated the feat in 2009 and 2010. Cheseto was also an NCAA West Region champion in 2009 and 2010, and earned All-American status in 2008 and 2010. Cheseto was also named GNAC's Male Athlete of the Year from 2008 to 2010, and West Region Male Athlete of the Year in 2009 and 2010.

In 2009 and 2010, Cheseto raced to All-American status in both the 5,000 and 10,000 meter races. In 2010, he won the GNAC championship in both events. He also set the record for the Anchorage Mayor's Half Marathon in 2010.

=== Disappearance and recovery ===
Throughout his time in Anchorage, Cheseto encouraged other athletes from Kenya to enroll and participate in the program. One of them was cousin and fellow Kapengurian, William Ritekwiang. Coach Friess gave Ritekwiang a scholarship as well, and brought him to Anchorage. In February 2011, Ritekwiang committed suicide. This event left Cheseto in a profound depression.

On November 6, 2011, Cheseto went out of his home in the middle of a blizzard, dressed only with jeans and a light jacket. On an interview with ESPN, Cheseto claims to have no recollection of what happened after he walked out. When his roommates reported him missing, the police started searching for Cheseto.

At around 3 a.m. on November 9, Cheseto was found outside a hotel near campus. According to police reports, during the 56 hours he was missing, he was exposed "brutal winter conditions". Cheseto was suffering from hypothermia and had severe frostbite on his hands and feet.

After a week of recovery, doctors had to amputate both of Cheseto's feet above the ankles. Cheseto has continued to recover, and is using prosthetics. He says he expects to compete in Paralympic Games in the future.

=== Post-recovery competition ===
In 2018, Cheseto competed in a marathon for the first time at the New York City Marathon, becoming the second double amputee in history to finish in under three hours. At the 2019 Boston Marathon, Cheseto set a world record for a marathon by a double amputee with a time of 2:42:24, beating previous record holder Richard Whitehead by 28 seconds.

Cheseto was named the 2018 Challenged Athlete of the Year by the Road Runners Club of America.

=== Profession ===
After graduating from Anchorage, Cheseto worked as a graduate assistant for the women and men's cross country and track and field teams. In 2018, he moved to Florida, became an American citizen, and began working for Prosthetic & Orthotic Associates of Orlando.
