= Sergei Biriukov =

Russian para-athlete (born 1998)

Personal information
- Nationality: Russian
- Born: 6 January 1998 (age 28)

Sport
- Sport: Para-athletics
- Disability class: T37
- Event: Long jump
Medal record
Men's para-athletics
Representing Neutral Paralympic Athletes
World Championships
Silver medal – second place	2025 New Delhi	Long jump T37

Sergei Biriukov (born 6 January 1998) is a Russian para-athlete specializing in long jump. He represented Russian Paralympic Committee athletes at the 2020 Summer Paralympics

== Career ==
In June 2019, Biriukov competed at the World Para Athletics Grand Prix in Grosseto, Italy, and won a gold medal in the long jump T36 event with a jump of 5.85 metres. He then represented Russian Paralympic Committee athletes at the 2020 Summer Paralympics and finished in fifth place in the long jump T37 event with a personal best jump of 5.96 metres. He competed at the 2025 World Para Athletics Championships and won a silver medal in the long jump T37 event.
