= Athletics at the 2020 Summer Paralympics – Men's 200 metres T61 =

Men's 200 metres T61 at the XVI Paralympic Games
- Venue: Tokyo National Stadium
- Dates: 3 September 2021 (final)
- Competitors: 5 from 4 nations
- Winning time: 23.59

Medalists
| 1st place, gold medalist(s) | | Ntando Mahlangu | South Africa |
| 2nd place, silver medalist(s) | | Richard Whitehead | Great Britain |
| 3rd place, bronze medalist(s) | | Ali Lacin | Germany |

The men's 200 metres T61 event at the 2020 Summer Paralympics in Tokyo, took place on 3 September 2021.

== Records ==
Prior to the competition, the existing records were as follows:

| World Record | Ntando Mahlangu (RSA) | 23.03 | Nottwil, Switzerland | 1 August 2019 |
| Paralympic Record | Vacant | – | | |

| Area | Time | Athlete | Nation |
|---|---|---|---|
| Africa | 23.03 WR | Ntando Mahlangu | South Africa |
| America | 25.69 | Luis Puertas | United States |
| Asia | Vacant | | |
| Europe | 23.72 | Record Mark | |
| Oceania | Vacant | | |

== Results ==
The final took place on 3 September 2021, at 19:42:

| Rank | Lane | Name | Nationality | Time | Notes |
|---|---|---|---|---|---|
| 1st place, gold medalist(s) | 5 | Ntando Mahlangu | South Africa | 23.59 | |
| 2nd place, silver medalist(s) | 6 | Richard Whitehead | Great Britain | 23.99 | SB |
| 3rd place, bronze medalist(s) | 7 | Ali Lacin | Germany | 24.64 | SB |
| 4 | 3 | Luis Puertas | United States | 25.40 | AR |
| 5 | 4 | Regas Woods | United States | 26.74 | SB |
