= Nicholas Hum =

Australian Paralympic athlete (1993–2025)

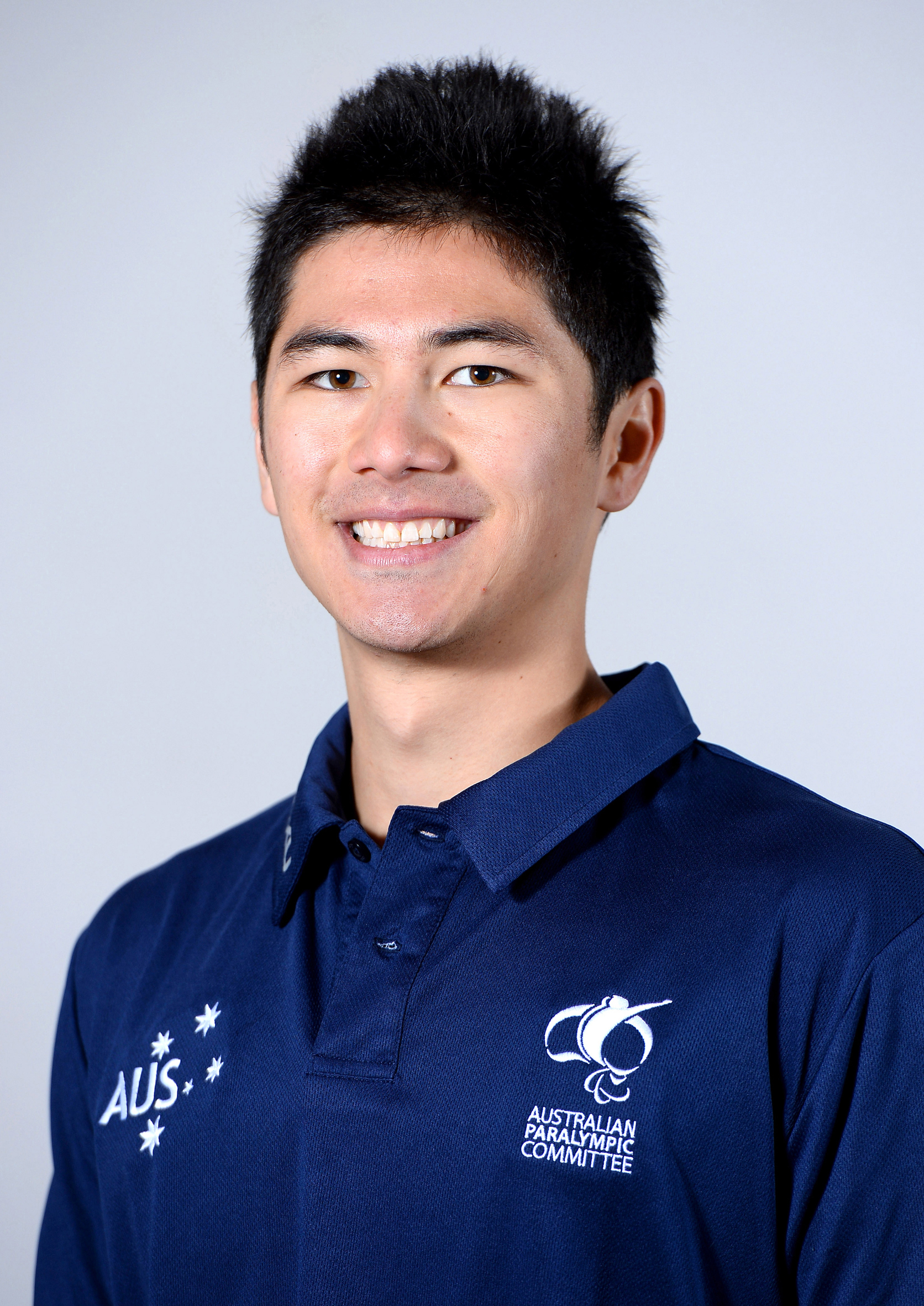
- 2016 Australian Paralympic team portrait

Personal information
- Born: 29 January 1993
- Died: 14 December 2025 (aged 32) Melbourne, Victoria, Australia
- Height: 180 cm (5 ft 11 in)
- Weight: 63 kg (139 lb)

Sport
- Country: Australia
- Sport: Track and field (T20)
- Club: Glenhuntly Athletic Club
- Coached by: John Boas
Medal record
Men's para-athletics
Representing Australia
Paralympic Games
Bronze medal – third place	2020 Tokyo	Men's Long Jump T20

Nicholas Hum (29 January 1993 – 14 December 2025) was an Australian Paralympic athlete. He won the bronze medal in the men's long jump T20 event at the 2020 Summer Paralympics held in Tokyo, Japan. He competed at the 2024 Paris Paralympics, his third Games.

== Background ==
Hum was born on 29 January 1993, and had an intellectual disability. He studied at Dandenong Emerson, graduating in 2011. He also worked as a cabinet maker.

On 15 December 2025, it was announced that Hum had died at the age of 32. He was survived by his wife Mairead and three children – William, Holly and Paige.

== Athletics ==
Hum started athletics in 2010 and was a member of the Glenhuntly Athletic Club in Melbourne, Victoria. He is classified as a T20. His main event is the T20 Long Jump. In November 2010, he won the long jump and the 100m at the Australian AWD Junior Championships in Canberra, breaking the national records in both events. Hum has competed at four IPC World Championships. At the 2011 IPC Athletics World Championships, he finished 5th in the Men's Long Jump F20 with a jump of 6.55m (-0.4) . This set an Australian and Oceania record. At the 2013 IPC Athletics World Championships, he finished 8th in the Men's Long Jump T20 with a jump of 6.19m(+1.0). At the 2015 IPC Athletics World Championships, he finished 10th in the Men's Long Jump T20 with a jump of 6.31m(+2.0).

At the 2016 Rio Paralympics, he finished fifth in the Men's Long Jump T20 with a jump of 6.89.

At the 2017 World Para Athletics Championships in London, England, he finished fifth in the Men's Long Jump T20 with a jump of f 6.78m (-0.1).

He competed at the 2020 Summer Paralympics, where he won the bronze medal in the Men's Long Jump T20 with an Australian record 7.12m. In the lead up to the 2024 Summer Paralympics in Paris, Hum finished fourth in the Men's Long Jump T20 at the 2024 World Para Athletics Championships in Kobe with a jump of 6.78m. He competed in the men's long jump T20 event at the 2024 Summer Paralympics where he finished sixth.

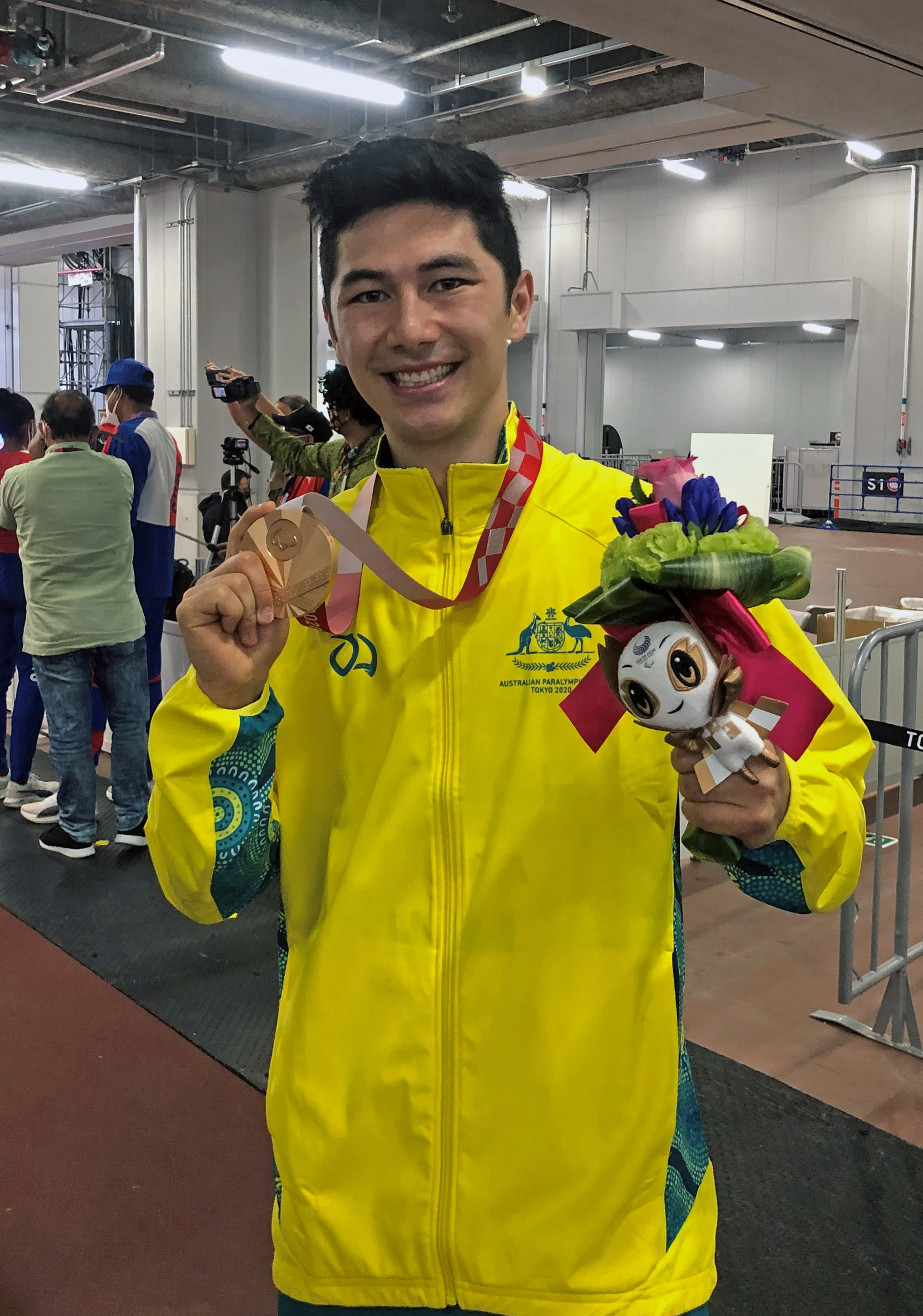
Hum with bronze medal at the 2020 Tokyo Paralympics

In 2024, he was coached by John Boas.

Hum's other sporting passion was basketball and he represented Australia at the Global Games in Italy in 2011.
