= Rodrigo Parreira =

Portuguese footballer (born 1993)

Personal information
- Full name: Rodrigo Miguel dos Reis Parreira
- Date of birth: 16 March 1993 (age 33)
- Place of birth: Sintra, Portugal
- Height: 1.76 m (5 ft 9 1/2 in)
- Position: Winger

Team information
- Current team: Jeunesse Canach
- Number: 17

Youth career
- 2006–2009: Benfica
- 2009–2012: Belenenses

Senior career*
Years	Team	Apps	(Gls)
2012−2015	Belenenses	0	(0)
2012−2013	→ 1º de Dezembro (loan)	9	(0)
2013−2014	→ Sintrense (loan)	30	(8)
2014	→ Atlético CP (loan)	4	(0)
2015	→ Operário (loan)	13	(2)
2015−2016	Operário	32	(12)
2016−2017	Barbadás	32	(12)
2017−2018	Olhanense	29	(5)
2018−2020	Sintrense	34	(11)
2020−2022	US Esch		
2021	→ Fola Esch (loan)	8	(0)
2022−2023	Luxembourg City	28	(15)
2023−2025	FC Koeppchen		
2025−	Jeunesse Canach	13	(0)
- * Club domestic league appearances and goals as of 13 June 2026

Rodrigo Miguel Reis Parreira (born 16 March 1993) is a Portuguese footballer who plays as a winger for Jeunesse Canach in the Luxembourg National Division.

He previously played in the 2014–15 Segunda Liga for Atlético CP.

== Career ==
After playing for FC Luxembourg City in the 2022-23 season, Parreira joined FC Koeppchen Wormeldange in July 2023.

In July 2025, Parreira moved to Jeunesse Canach.
