= Mateus Evangelista Cardoso =

Brazilian Paralympic athlete

Mateus Evangelista
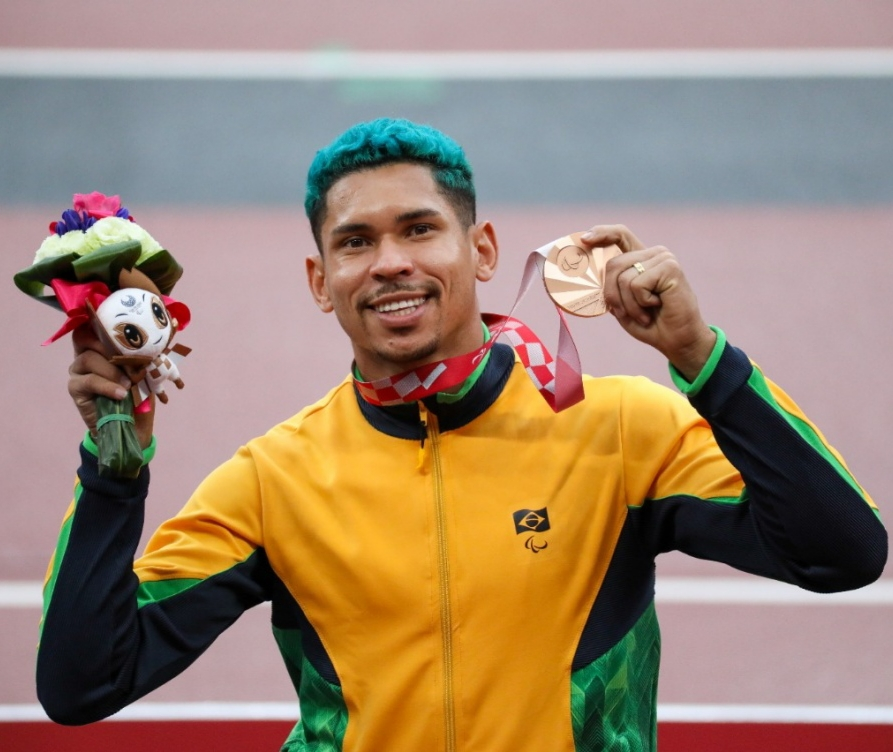
- Evangelista at the 2020 Summer Paralympics

Personal information
- Full name: Mateus Evangelista Cardoso
- Born: 15 February 1994 (age 32) Porto Velho, Brazil

Sport
- Country: Brazil
- Sport: Para-athletics
- Disability: Cerebral palsy
- Disability class: T37
- Events: 100 m; 200 m; 400 m; Long jump
Medal record
Paralympic Games
Silver medal – second place	2016 Rio de Janeiro	Long jump T37
Bronze medal – third place	2020 Tokyo	Long jump T37
Bronze medal – third place	2024 Paris	Long jump T37
World Championships
Gold medal – first place	2017 London	100 m T37
Silver medal – second place	2017 London	200 m T37
Silver medal – second place	2017 London	Long jump T37
Silver medal – second place	2019 Dubai	Long jump T37
Bronze medal – third place	2024 Kobe	Long jump T37
Parapan American Games
Gold medal – first place	2015 Toronto	Long jump T37
Gold medal – first place	2015 Toronto	100 m T37
Gold medal – first place	2015 Toronto	200 m T37
Gold medal – first place	2019 Lima	100m T37
Silver medal – second place	2019 Lima	200m T37
Silver medal – second place	2019 Lima	Long jump T37/38

Mateus Evangelista Cardoso (Note: This name uses Portuguese naming customs: the first or maternal family name is Evangelista and the second or paternal family name is Cardoso.) (born 15 February 1994) is a Brazilian Paralympic athlete with cerebral palsy. He competes in several T37-classification athletics events.

He represented Brazil at the 2016 Summer Paralympics held in Rio de Janeiro, Brazil and he won the silver medal in the men's long jump T37 event. At the 2016 Summer Paralympics, he also finished in 4th place in the men's 100 metres T37 event.

In 2021, he won one the bronze medal in the men's long jump T37 event at the 2020 Summer Paralympics held in Tokyo, Japan. He earned bronze again in the same event at the 2024 Summer Paralympics in Paris, France.

== Career ==
He represented Brazil at the 2015 Parapan American Games held in Toronto, Canada and he won the gold medal in the men's long jump T37 event and both the men's 100 metres T37 and men's 200 metres T37 events.

At the 2017 World Para Athletics Championships held in London, United Kingdom, he won the gold medal in the men's 100 metres T37 event, the silver medal in the men's 200 metres T37 event and also the silver medal in the men's long jump T37 event. Two years later, at the 2019 World Para Athletics Championships held in Dubai, United Arab Emirates, he won the silver medal in the men's long jump T37 event and he qualified to represent Brazil at the 2020 Summer Paralympics in Tokyo, Japan.
