= Ali Lacin =

German Paralympic athlete (born 1988)

Personal information
- Born: 17 April 1988 (age 38) Berlin, Germany

Sport
- Country: Germany
- Sport: Para-athletics
- Disability class: T61
- Events: 200 metres; Long jump
Medal record
Men's para-athletics
Representing Germany
Paralympic Games
Bronze medal – third place	2020 Tokyo	200 m T61
World Championships
Bronze medal – third place	2019 Dubai	200 m T61
European Championships
Silver medal – second place	2018 Berlin	200 m T61

Ali Lacin (born 17 April 1988) is a German Paralympic athlete competing in T61-classification events. He won the bronze medal in the men's 200 metres T61 event at the 2020 Summer Paralympics held in Tokyo, Japan.

== Career ==
Lacin competes as a T61-classified athlete, a class specifically for athletes with double above the knee amputation.

In 2019, he won the bronze medal in the men's 200 metres T61 event at the World Para Athletics Championships held in Dubai, United Arab Emirates. For winning a bronze medal at the Summer Paralympics (200 m race), he was awarded on 8 November 2021 the Silver Laural leaf by the President of the Federal Republic of Germany.

He competed in the men's long jump T63 event at the 2023 World Para Athletics Championships held in Paris, France.

== Achievements ==
Year	Competition	Venue	Position	Event	Notes
Representing Germany
2018	European Championships	Berlin, Germany	2nd	200 m	27.39 s
2019	World Championships	Dubai, United Arab Emirates	3rd	200 m	24.63 s
2021	Summer Paralympics	Tokyo, Japan	3rd	200 m	24.64 s
