= Ranki Oberoi =

Dutch Paralympic athlete (born 1993)

Personal information
- Born: 21 September 1993 (age 32)
- Height: 183 cm (6 ft 0 in)

Sport
- Country: Netherlands
- Sport: Para-athletics
- Disability: Intellectual impairment
- Disability class: T20
- Events: Long jump; Triple jump
Medal record
Men's para-athletics
Representing Netherlands
World Championships
Gold medal – first place	2019 Dubai	Long jump T20
Bronze medal – third place	2015 Doha	Triple jump T20
European Championships
Bronze medal – third place	2018 Berlin	Long jump T20

Ranki Oberoi (born 21 September 1993) is a Dutch Paralympic athlete competing in T20-classification long jump and triple jump events. At the 2019 World Championships held in Dubai, United Arab Emirates, he won the gold medal in the men's long jump T20 event. He also represented the Netherlands at the 2020 Summer Paralympics in Tokyo, Japan

== Career ==
In 2014, Oberoi finished in 4th place in the men's long jump T20 event at the IPC Athletics European Championships held in Swansea, United Kingdom.

Oberoi competed at the 2015 World Championships in Doha, Qatar where he won the bronze medal in the men's triple jump T20 event. He also competed at the 2017 World Championships where he finished in 4th place in the men's long jump T20 event. At the 2018 European Championships held in Berlin, Germany, he won the bronze medal in the men's long jump T20 event.

He also represented the Netherlands at the 2016 Summer Paralympics in Rio de Janeiro, Brazil and he finished in 4th place in the men's long jump T20 event.

Oberoi competed in the men's long jump T20 event at the 2023 World Para Athletics Championships held in Paris, France. He finished in 5th place.

== Achievements ==
Year	Competition	Venue	Position	Event	Notes
Representing Netherlands
2015	World Championships	Doha, Qatar	3rd	Triple jump	13.48 m
2016	Summer Paralympics	Rio de Janeiro, Brazil	4th	Long jump	6.96 m
2017	World Championships	London, United Kingdom	4th	Long jump	6.90 m
2018	European Championships	Berlin, Germany	3rd	Long jump	7.13 m
2019	World Championships	Dubai, United Arab Emirates	1st	Long jump	7.39 m
2023	World Championships	Paris, France	5th	Long jump	6.83 m
