= Ari Gesini =

Australian Paralympic athlete (born 2001)

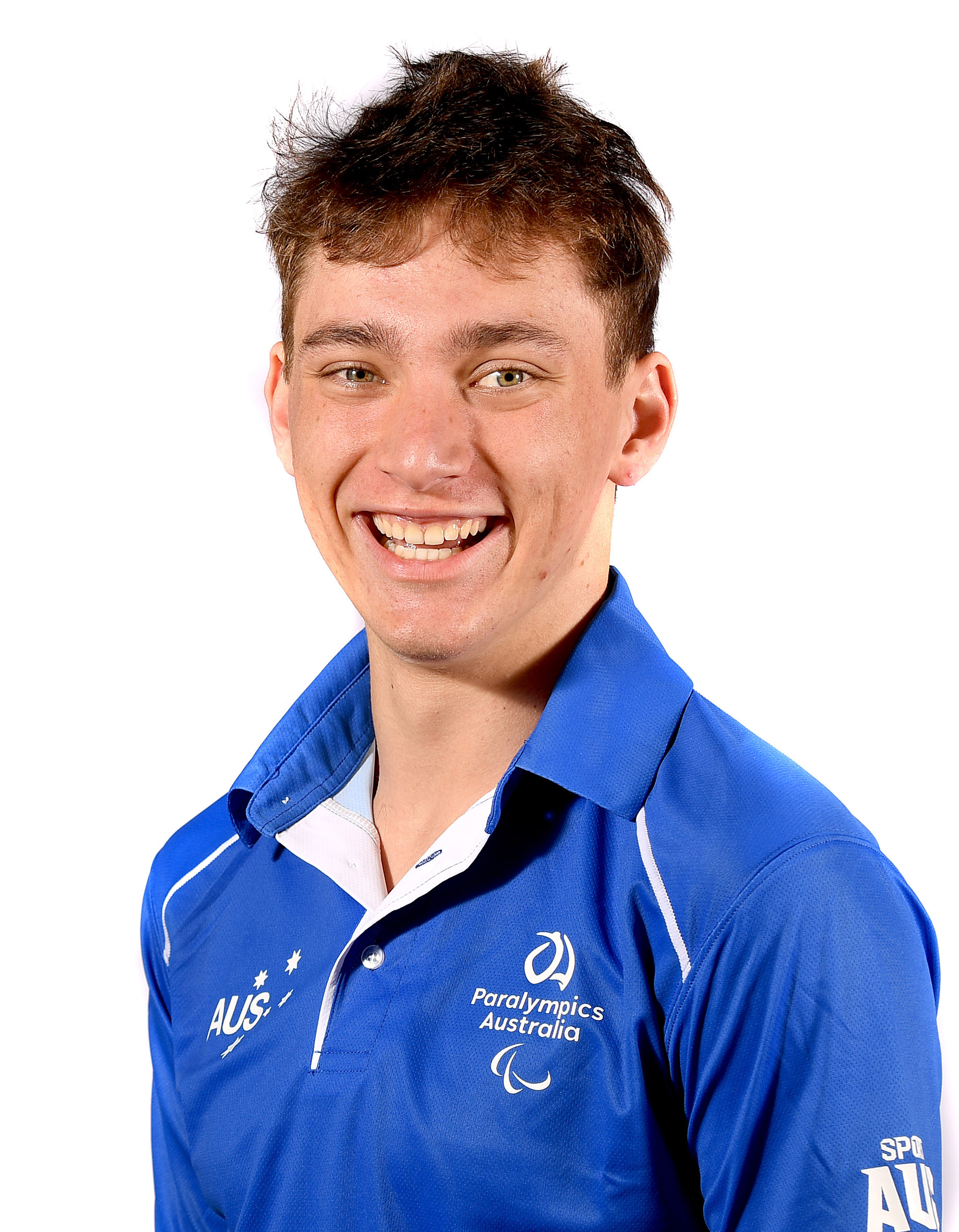
- Gesini in 2019

Personal information
- Nationality: Australian
- Born: 23 December 2001 (age 24) Canberra, Australia

Sport
- Country: Australia
- Sport: Para-Athletics
- Event: T38 Long jump
- Club: ACT Para-Athletics Talent Squad
- Coached by: Sebastian Kuzminski and Iryna Dvoskina

Achievements and titles
- World finals: World Para-Athletics Championships 2019, Dubai
- Personal best: 6.38m

Ari Gesini (born 23 December 2001) is an Australian Paralympic athlete in the T38 class. Ari competes in the long jump and 100m sprint. He made his Paralympic debut at the 2020 Summer Paralympics in Tokyo.

== Personal ==
Ari Gesini was born on 23 December 2001. He was diagnosed with left-sided hemiplegic cerebral palsy at age three. He lives in Canberra and attended Telopea Park School (Lycee Franco-Australian de Canberra) from 2007 to 2017. He also attended Narrabundah College from 2018 to 2019. Gesini is currently studying a Bachelor of Science in Psychology at the University of Canberra.

== Athletics ==
Gesini commenced participating in sport to assist his coordination and mobility. He is classified as a T38 athlete. His first athletics coach in Canberra was Chris Timpson. At the age of thirteen, Iryna Dvoskina invited Gesini to join her elite para-athletics squad based at the Australian Institute of Sport in Canberra.

Gesini won the gold medal in the Men's Long Jump T35-38 at the 2017 World Junior Championships in Nottwil, Switzerland. At the 2019 World Para Athletics Championships in Dubai, he finished fourth with a jump of 6.16 m, an Oceanic record, and 12th in the Men's 100m T38 with a PB of 12.05 seconds.

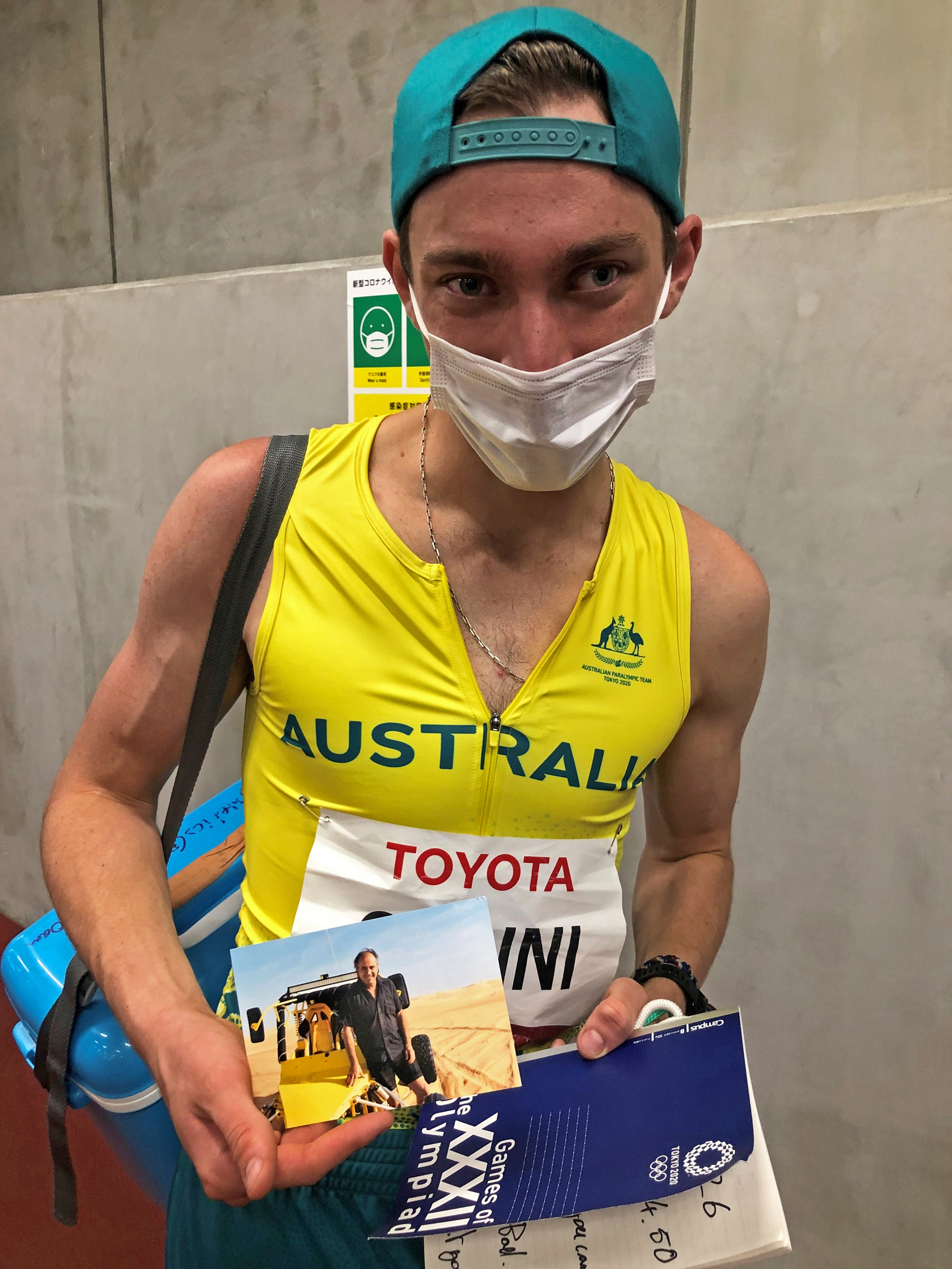
Gesini with a photo of his dad, Steve, who died in June 2021, a few months before Gesini competed at the Tokyo 2020 Paralympic Games

At the 2020 Tokyo Paralympics, he finished seventh in his heat of the Men's 100m T38 and 11th in the Men's Long Jump T38. At the 2024 World Para Athletics Championships in Kobe, Japan, he finished sixth in the Men's Long Jump T38 with a distance of 6.03m (+1.9). At the 2025 World Para Athletics Championships in New Delhi, he finished ninth in the Men's Long Jump T38 with 5.90m.

In 2022, he is coached by Iryna Dvoskina and Sebastian Kuzminski at the Australian Institute of Sport in Canberra.

== Recognition ==
- Gesini was awarded the Chief Minister's Sporting Award in 2011, 2012 and 2014.
- In 2014/15, he was named Youth Para Athlete of the Season by Athletics ACT.
- In 2020, he was awarded a Tier 1 Scholarship within the Sport Australia Hall of Fame Scholarship & Mentoring Program and paired with SAHOF Member George Gregan.
