= Carlos Pérez (long jumper) =

Carlos Javier Pérez Hernandez
Personal information
- Nationality: Spanish

Sport
- Country: Spain
- Sport: Track and field (T46)

Carlos Javier Pérez Hernandez is a T46 athlete from Spain who competes in the long jump.

== Personal ==
Pérez is from La Palma in the Canary Islands. He is missing part of his right arm below the elbow.

== Athletes ==
Pérez is an F46 classified track and field athlete. He competes in the long jump, triple jump and javelin, and is a member of the Tenerife CajaCanarias athletics club.

In 2010, while being based in the Canary Islands, Pérez was coached by Pepe Ortega. He won the 2010 Canary Islands Track Championship . This victory earned him an invitation to the 2010 Spanish Adapted IPC Athletics Championship in Gijón. The competition was his first on the national level, where he won three gold medals: one each in the long jump. triple jump and the javelin. In 2010, 2011 and 2012, he trained at Centre d'Alt Rendiment, the high performance training center in Barcelona where he worked with Antonio Corgos and the FC Barcelona athletic club. As a 15-year-old, he finished first in the long jump at the 2011 Valencia hosted Spanish Adapted IPC Athletics Championship. The second-place finisher, David Bravo, said afterwards of Pérez 's performance, "Carlos treasures a great future because of his young age." He picked up a second gold medal in the javelin. In 2011, he made the national team and participated in his first international meet when he competed a competition in Italy. In July 2013, he participated in the 2013 IPC Athletics World Championships.
