= Oleksandr Lytvynenko (athlete) =

Ukrainian Paralympic athlete (born 1990)

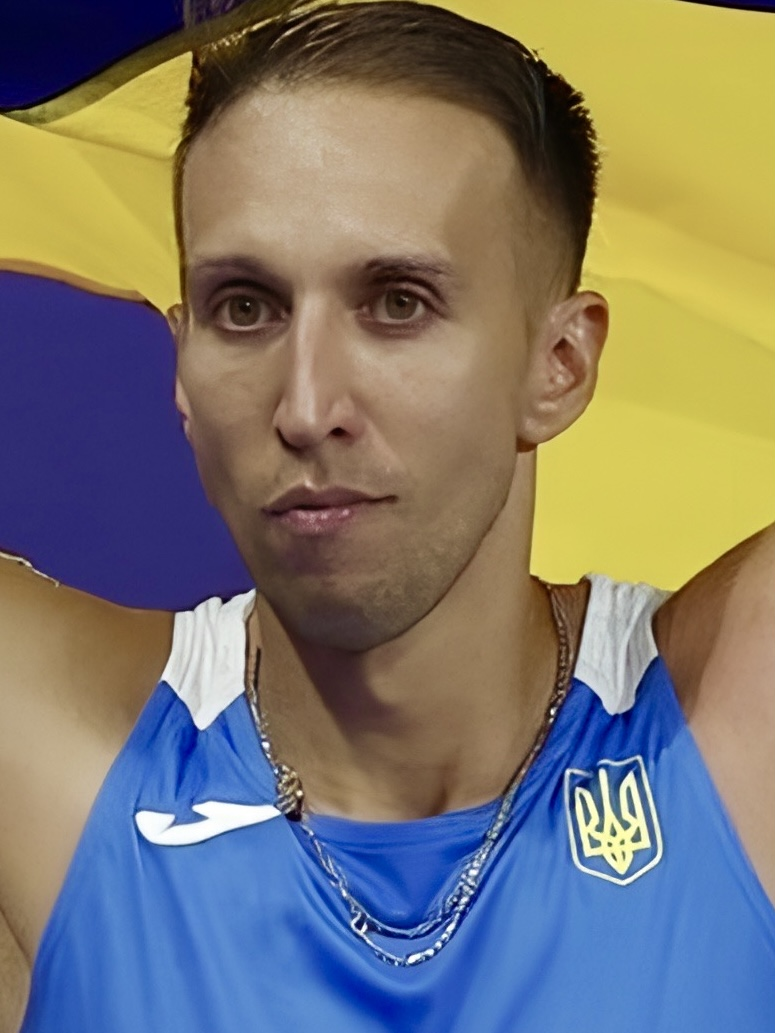
- Lytvynenko at the 2024 Summer Paralympics

Personal information
- Nationality: Ukrainian
- Born: 4 February 1990 (age 36) Odesa, Ukrainian SSR, Soviet Union

Sport
- Sport: Para-athletics
- Disability class: T36
- Event: long jump
Medal record
Men's para-athletics
Representing Ukraine
Paralympic Games
Bronze medal – third place	2024 Paris	Long jump T36
World Championships
Bronze medal – third place	2019 Dubai	Long jump T36
Bronze medal – third place	2023 Paris	Long jump T36
Bronze medal – third place	2025 New Delhi	Long jump T36
European Championships
Gold medal – first place	2018 Berlin	Long jump T36
Gold medal – first place	2021 Bydgoszcz	Long jump T36

Oleksandr Lytvynenko (Ukrainian: Олександр Литвиненко; born 4 February 1990) is a Ukrainian para-athlete specializing in long jump.

== Career ==
Lytvynenko represented Ukraine at the 2019 World Para Athletics Championships and won a bronze medal in the long jump T36 event. In 2023, he won the bronze medal in the men's long jump T36 event at the World Para Athletics Championships held in Paris, France.

Lytvynenko represented Ukraine at the 2024 Summer Paralympics and won a bronze medal in the long jump T36 event.
