= Lenine Cunha =

Portuguese Paralympic athlete

Personal information
- Nationality: Portuguese
- Born: 4 December 1982 (age 43) Mafamude, Portugal
- Height: 176 cm (5 ft 9 in)

Sport
- Country: Portugal
- Sport: Track and field
- Disability class: (T20)
- Event: long jump
- Club: Sport Club Lenine Cunha
- Coached by: Jose Costa Pereira
Medal record
Paralympic athletics
Representing Portugal
Paralympic Games
| Bronze medal – third place | 2012 London | Long jump - F20 |
IPC World Championships
| Silver medal – second place | 2011 Christchurch | Long jump - T20 |
| Bronze medal – third place | 2013 Lyon | Long jump - T20 |
| Gold medal – first place | 2015 Doha | Triple jump - T20 |
IPC European Championships
| Silver medal – second place | 2014 Swansea | Long jump - T20 |
| Bronze medal – third place | 2012 Stadskanaal | Long jump - T20 |
| Bronze medal – third place | 2016 Grosseto | Long jump - T20 |

Lenine Cunha (born 4 December 1982) is a Paralympic athlete from Portugal who competes in T20 classification long jump and triple jump events. Cunha represented Portugal at the 2000 Summer Paralympics in Sydney, in both the long jump and the 100 metre sprint. It would be 12 years until Cunha could again compete at the Paralympics due to the T20 classification being removed from the program due to a scandal at the 2000 Games. With the reintroduction of the T20 class at the 2012 London Games he finished third to take the bronze medal in the long jump. In 2015 Cunha won the gold medal in the triple jump at the IPC World Championships in Doha.

In 2024, during the Paralympic Games, Lenine Cunha was elected to the IPC Athletes' Council, being the one with the most votes and the first on the Council with an intellectual disability. He and the other 5 newly elected athletes participated in the closing ceremony of the Games.
