= Richard Whitehead (athlete) =

British Paralympic athlete

Richard Whitehead MBE
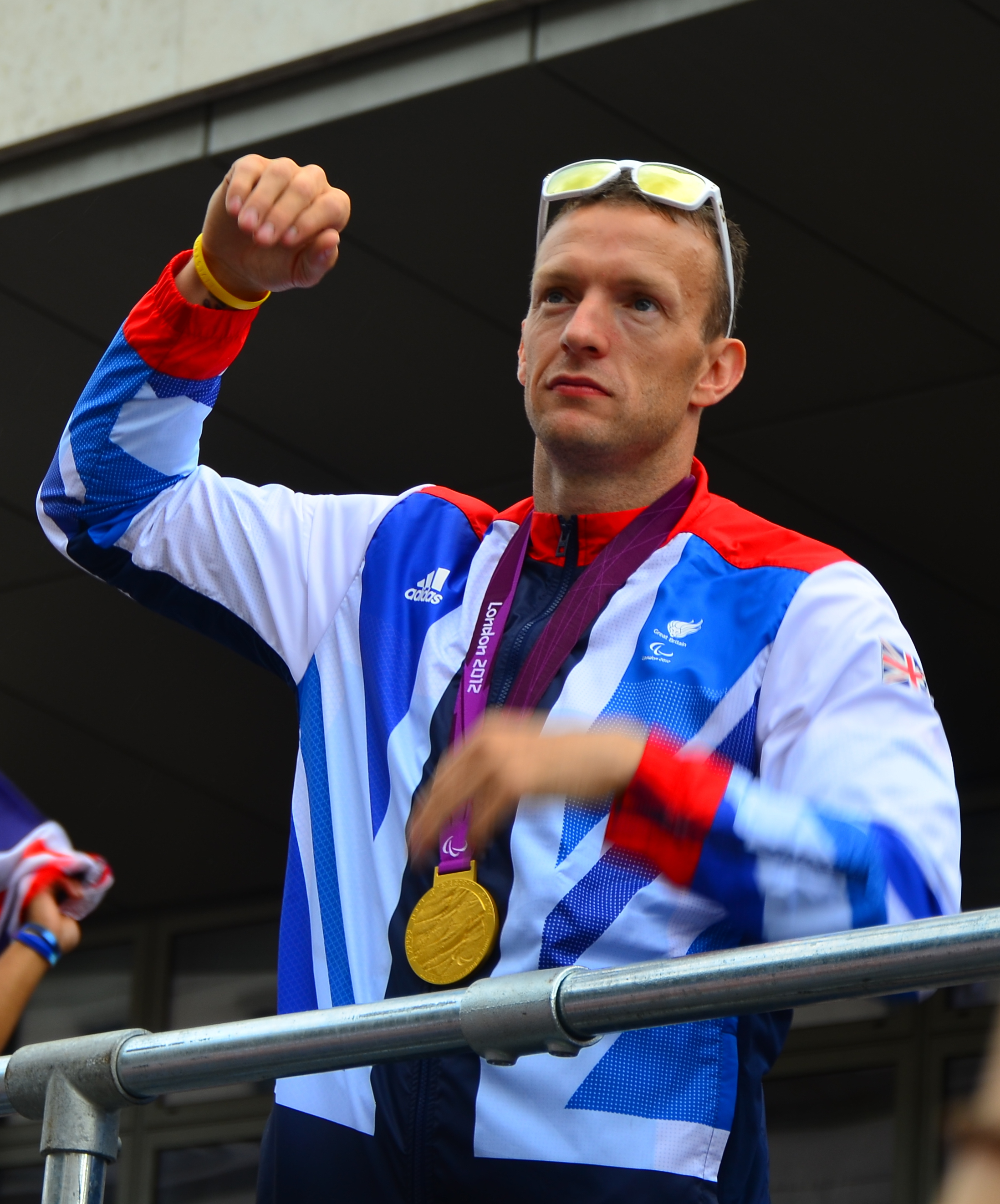
- Richard Whitehead with his Paralympic Gold medal at the Our Greatest Team Parade

Personal information
- Nationality: British
- Born: 19 July 1976 (age 49) Nottingham
- Weight: 80 kg (176 lb)

Sport
- Country: Great Britain
- Sport: Running

Achievements and titles
- World finals: 2012 London 200m – 24.38s (WR)
Medal record
Men's paralympic athletics
Representing Great Britain
Paralympic Games
Silver medal – second place	2020 Tokyo	200 m T61
Silver medal – second place	2016 Rio	100 m T42
Gold medal – first place	2016 Rio	200 m T42
Gold medal – first place	2012 London	200 m T42
IPC World Championships
Gold medal – first place	2011 Christchurch	200 m T42
Gold medal – first place	2013 Lyon	200 m T42
Gold medal – first place	2015 Doha	200 m T42
Gold medal – first place	2017 London	200 m T42
Bronze medal – third place	2017 London	100 m T42
IPC European Championships
Gold medal – first place	2012 Stadskanaal	200 m T42
Gold medal – first place	2016 Grosseto	100 m T42
Gold medal – first place	2016 Grosseto	200 m T42
Bronze medal – third place	2012 Stadskanaal	100 m T42

Richard Whitehead MBE (born 19 July 1976) is a British athlete. He runs with prosthetic legs, as he has a double through-knee congenital amputation. He has set world records for athletes with a double amputation, in both the full and half marathon.

== Biography ==
Whitehead's earlier career was a swimming teacher at Clifton Leisure Centre in Nottingham. He is a former ice sledge hockey player, and competed for the GB team at the 2006 Winter Paralympics in Turin.

At the 2010 Chicago Marathon, Whitehead broke his previous world record for athletes with lower-limb amputations, with a time of 2:42:52. That time was bested by 28 seconds by Marko Cheseto at the 2019 Boston Marathon.

Whitehead was unable to compete in the marathon at London 2012 as there was no category for leg amputees, and was refused permission by the IPC to compete against upper-body amputees and so had to turn to sprinting to compete at the 2012 Paralympics, where he won the gold medal in the 200m T42 Athletics event with a world record time of 24.38 seconds.

Whitehead was appointed Member of the Order of the British Empire (MBE) in the 2013 New Year Honours for services to athletics.

Whitehead's name was added to the Nottingham City Transport bus service "Pathfinder 100" on 18 September 2012; the bus links his home village of Lowdham with Southwell and Nottingham. He was appointed the first-ever patron of Sarcoma UK, the bone- and soft-tissue cancer charity, on 28 January 2013. On 21 April 2013, he competed in the London Marathon coming in 23rd place with a time of 3:15:53.

At the 2016 Rio Paralympics, Whitehead won gold in the T42 200 metres and silver in the T42 100 metres, which he shared with Denmark's Daniel Wagner after the pair finished in a dead heat for second.

In 2013, he launched his fundraising campaign, "Richard Whitehead Runs Britain", to run from John O'Groats to Land's End. raising money for Sarcoma UK and Scope.

At the 2020 Tokyo Paralympics, Whitehead won silver in the T61 200 metres.

In 2022, Whitehead took part in Channel 4's Celebrity Hunted. He was caught 5th, after falling over a gate, and subsequently lying low in a field. His teammate Iwan Thomas successfully made it to the extraction point to win.

On 13 October 2024, Whitehead set the world record for the Fastest Double Amputee Marathon at the Bank of America Chicago Marathon with a time of 2 hours 41 minutes and 36 seconds. On 3 December 2024, Whitehead had a leading role in a three part Docu-Series by Prime Video called Dare to Defy. He co-hosted the show with Adele Roberts tackling the topics of inclusion and diversity in sport.

In January 2025, Richard announced that he would complete 20 marathons throughout the year around the world, to mark and celebrate his very first marathon in New York in 2004. Richard finished his 20 marathons across the world in New York in November 2025, his 100th marathon overall.

Richard’s 2024 World Record has already been surpassed twice in 2026, firstly at the Milano Marathon in April finishing in 2:40:47, and just two weeks later, beating his own record at the TCS London Marathon, with a remarkable time of 2:40:25.

RichardWhiteheadMBE - Athlete, Marathon Runner, diversity champion, Motivational Speaker

== See also ==
- 2012 Summer Olympics and Paralympics gold post boxes
