= Ntando Mahlangu =

South African Paralympic athlete

Personal information
- Born: 26 January 2002 (age 24)

Sport
- Country: South Africa
- Sport: Para-athletics
- Disability: Amputated legs at the knee due to fibular hemimelia
- Disability class: T61 (2018 – present); T42 (until 2018)
- Events: 200 metres; Long jump
Medal record
Men's para-athletics
Representing South Africa
Paralympic Games
Gold medal – first place	2020 Tokyo	Long jump T63
Gold medal – first place	2020 Tokyo	200 m T61
Silver medal – second place	2016 Rio de Janeiro	200 m T42
World Championships
Gold medal – first place	2019 Dubai	200 m T61
Silver medal – second place	2017 London	200 m T42

Ntando Mahlangu (born 26 January 2002) is a South African Paralympic athlete. He won the gold medal in both the men's long jump T63 and men's 200 metres T61 events at the 2020 Summer Paralympics in Tokyo, Japan.

He won the silver medal in the men's 200 metres T42 event at the 2016 Summer Paralympics in Rio de Janeiro, Brazil. He is also a two-time medallist at the World Para Athletics Championships.

== Personal life ==
Mahlangu was born with fibular hemimelia, which affected the development of both his legs below the knee. In 2012, it was decided to amputate both his legs at the knee. Later that year he received his first set of blades from South African Charity Jumping Kids. He attended primary school at Laerskool Constantiapark and high school at Afrikaanse Hoër Seunskool (Affies) in Pretoria.

== Career ==
Early in his career, he competed as a T42-classified athlete. Mahlangu represented South Africa at the 2016 Summer Paralympics held in Rio de Janeiro where he won the silver medal in the men's 200 metres T42 event at the age of 14.

At the 2017 World Para Athletics Championships in London, United Kingdom, he won the silver medal in the men's 200 metres T42 event. He also competed in the men's 100 metres T42 event, where he did not advance to compete in the final. At the beginning of 2018, World Para Athletics implemented classification changes and, as of that year, he competes as a T61-classified athlete, a class specifically for athletes with double above-the-knee amputation.

At the 2019 World Para Athletics Championships in Dubai, United Arab Emirates, he won the gold medal in the men's 200 metres T61 event and finished fourth in the men's long jump T63 event. He qualified to represent South Africa at the 2020 Summer Paralympics in Tokyo, Japan. In April 2021, Mahlangu set a new world record of 22.94 seconds in the men's 200 metres T61 final at the 2021 South African Sports for the Physically Disabled (SASAPD) National Championships in Gqeberha, South Africa.

Mahlangu won the gold medal in the men's long jump T63 event at the 2020 Summer Paralympics held in Tokyo, Japan, setting a new world record of 7.17 m. He also won the gold medal in the men's 200 metres T61 event. In 2020, he starred in the Netflix documentary film Rising Phoenix, in which he is depicted racing a cheetah.

== Achievements ==
=== Track ===
Year	Competition	Venue	Position	Event	Notes
Representing South Africa
2016	Summer Paralympics	Rio de Janeiro, Brazil	2nd	200 m	23.77 s
2017	World Championships	London, United Kingdom	2nd	200 m	23.95 s
2019	World Championships	Dubai, United Arab Emirates	1st	200 m	23.23 s
2021	Summer Paralympics	Tokyo, Japan	1st	200 m	23.59 s

=== Field ===
Year	Competition	Venue	Position	Event	Notes
Representing South Africa
2019	World Championships	Dubai, United Arab Emirates	4th	Long jump	5.82 m
2021	Summer Paralympics	Tokyo, Japan	1st	Long jump	7.17 m
