= Australia at the 2025 World Para Athletics Championships =

- IPC code: AUS
- NPC: Paralympics Australia
- Website: paralympic.org.au

in New Delhi, India September 27, 2025 – October 5, 2025
- Competitors: 51
- Medals Ranked 22nd: Gold 2 Silver 6 Bronze 3 Total 11

Summer appearances
- 2023; 2024; 2025

Australia is participating in the 2025 World Para Athletics Championships, being held in New Delhi, India from 27 September to 5 October 2025. The Australian contingent consists of 51 athletes.

== Track events ==
Legend:

- Note – Ranks given for track events are only within the athlete's heat.
- Q = Qualified for the next round
- q = Qualified for the next round as the fastest loser or, in field events, by position without achieving the qualifying target.
- DSQ = Disqualified
- DNF = Did Not Finish
- WR = World Record
- CR = Championship Record
- AR = Area (or Continental) Record
- PB = Personal Best
- SB = Season's Best

=== Men ===
Athlete	Event	Heats		Semi-final		Final	
Athlete	Event	Result	Rank	Result	Rank	Result	Rank
Nathan Jason	100m T12	11.06 AR	2q	11.04 AR	2q	11.11	4
Chad Perris	100m T13	10.86	1Q	—N/a		10.96	2nd place, silver medalist(s)
James Tirado	100m T13	11.93	5	Did not advance to next round			
Rheed McCracken	100m T34	14.95	1Q	—N/a		15.04	2nd place, silver medalist(s)
Jack Netting	100m T35	12.89 PB	4	Did not advance to next round			
Jackson Love	100m T35	12.34 AR	4q	—N/a		4 Oct; 18:15 IST	
Jordan Fairweather	100m T35	12.78 PB	5q	—N/a		4 Oct; 18:15 IST	
Alexander McKillop	100m T36	12.60 SB	6	Did not advance to next round			
James Turner	100m T36	11.94	1Q	—N/a		12.21	7
Liam Kernick	100m T37	12.09 PB	4	Did not advance to next round			
Samuel Allen	100m T37	11.80 AR	4	Did not advance to next round			
Shannon Winchester	100m T38	11.76	4	Did not advance to next round			
Ullrich Muller	100m T38	11.18 PB	5q	—N/a		11.31	8
Michael Shippley	100m T44	12.68 AR	8	Did not advance to next round			
Jaydon Page	100m T47	11.21	3	Did not advance to next round			
Sam McIntosh	100m T52	17.41	3Q	—N/a		4 Oct; 18:05 IST	
Luke Bailey	100m T54	14.73	5	Did not advance to next round			
Jack Netting	200m T35	27.21	5	Did not advance to next round			
Jackson Love	200m T35	24.73 AR	4q	—N/a		24.71 AR	8
Jordan Fairweather	200m T35	26.54 PB	5	Did not advance to next round			
Liam Kernick	200m T37	DNS		Did not advance to next round			
Samuel Allen	200m T37	23.72 AR	5	Did not advance to next round			
Rheed McCracken	400m T34	49.17	1Q	—N/a		48.67	2nd place, silver medalist(s)
James Turner	400m T36	55.32	2Q	—N/a		52.18 SB	1st place, gold medalist(s)
Ben Eppelstun	400m T38	55.09	4	Did not advance to next round			
Cooper Robb-Jackson	400m T38	54.63 PB	6	Did not advance to next round			
Ullrich Muller	400m T38	51.21 PB	3Q	—N/a		50.96 PB	6
Luke Bailey	400m T54	49.28	5	Did not advance to next round			
Samuel Carter	400m T54	46.91	3q	—N/a		47.46	8
Daniel Milone	800m T20	—N/a				2:01.51 AR	7
Rheed McCracken	800m T34	1:41.01	3Q	—N/a			
Samuel Carter	800m T54	4 Oct; 19:01 IST					
Samuel Rizzo	800m T54	4 Oct; 18:45 IST					
Jaryd Clifford	1500m T13	4:04.58	4Q	—N/a		3:58.87	3rd place, bronze medalist(s)
William Short	1500m T13	4:23.06	7	Did not advance to next round			
Daniel Milone	1500m T20	4:17.02	8	Did not advance to next round			
Samuel Carter	1500m T54	3:12.57	4Q	—N/a		2:59.20	11
Samuel Rizzo	1500m T54	3:02.24	7	Did not advance to next round			
Jaryd Clifford	5000m T13	—N/a				15:26.57	5
Samuel Rizzo	5000m T54	—N/a				10:50.19	4

=== Women ===
Athlete	Event	Heats		Semi-final		Final	
Athlete	Event	Result	Rank	Result	Rank	Result	Rank
Coco Espie	100m T34	—N/a				22.74	7
Abby Craswell	100m T36	15.21	4q	—N/a		15.40	7
Kirra Wright	100m T36	14.94 PB	3Q	—N/a		15.05	5
Mali Lovell	100m T36	14.54	2Q	—N/a		14.56	2nd place, silver medalist(s)
Akeesha Snowden	100m T37	14.06	3Q	—N/a		13.89	4
Niamh Mac Alasdair	100m T37	14.85 SB	4q	—N/a		14.98	8
Rhiannon Clarke	100m T38	12.99	4q	—N/a		13.09	7
Makayla Elcoate	100m T44	—N/a				14.83	4
Lexie Brown	100m T47	13.12 PB	6	Did not advance to next round			
Abby Craswell	200m T36	—N/a				DNS	
Mali Lovell	200m T36	—N/a				29.60	2nd place, silver medalist(s)
Briseis Brittain	200m T38	27.51 PB	5	Did not advance to next round			
Layla Sharp	200m T38	28.51 PB	6	Did not advance to next round			
Rhiannon Clarke	200m T38	27.13	4	Did not advance to next round			
Lexie Brown	200m T47	26.87 PB	7	Did not advance to next round			
Telaya Blacksmith	400m T20	1:00.10	3Q	—N/a		1:03.57	8
Coco Espie	400m T34	—N/a				1:13.82	4
Akeesha Snowden	400m T37	—N/a				1:06.68	4
Briseis Brittain	400m T38	1:04.18 PB	5q	—N/a			
Layla Sharp	400m T38	1:05.62 SB	3Q	—N/a			
Rhiannon Clarke	400m T38	1:05.13	2Q	—N/a			
Coco Espie	800m T34	—N/a				4 Oct; 18:35 IST	
Annabelle Colman	1500m T20	—N/a				4:35.56	3rd place, bronze medalist(s)

=== Universal ===
Athlete	Event	Final	
Athlete	Event	Result	Rank
	4x100 relay		

== Field events ==
Legend:

- Note – Ranks given for track events are only within the athlete's heat.
- Q = Qualified for the next round
- q = Qualified for the next round as the fastest loser or, in field events, by position without achieving the qualifying target.
- DSQ = Disqualified
- WR = World Record
- CR = Championship Record
- PB = Personal Best
- SB = Season's Best

=== Men ===
Athlete	Event	Qualification		Final	
Athlete	Event	Result	Rank	Result	Rank
Corey Anderson	Javelin Throw F38	—N/a		45.39	6
Michal Burian	Javelin Throw F44	—N/a		59.58	6
Ari Gesini	Long Jump T38	—N/a		5.90	9
Michael Mayne	Long Jump T38	—N/a		6.33 AR	6
Cameron Crombie	Shot Put F38	—N/a		4 Oct; 17:15 IST	

=== Women ===
Athlete	Event	Qualification		Final	
Athlete	Event	Result	Rank	Result	Rank
Dayna Crees	Javelin Throw F34	—N/a		18.97 AR	3rd place, bronze medalist(s)
Niamh Mac Alasdair	Long Jump T37	—N/a		NM	
Vanessa Low	Long Jump T63	—N/a		5.49 CR	1st place, gold medalist(s)
Makayla Elcoate	Long Jump T64	—N/a		4.04	10
Sarah Walsh	Long Jump T64	—N/a		5.14 SB	5
Kirra Wright	Shot Put F36	—N/a		8.30 PB	2nd place, silver medalist(s)
Ella Hose	Shot Put F37	—N/a		10.80 SB	4
