= China at the 2025 World Para Athletics Championships =

- IPC code: CHN
- NPC: CASPWD
- Website: www.cdpf.org.cn

in New Delhi, India September 27, 2025 – October 5, 2025
- Medals: Gold 4 Silver 7 Bronze 3 Total 14

Summer appearances
- 2025

China is participating in the 2025 World Para Athletics Championships, being held in New Delhi, India from 27 September to 5 October 2025.

== Medalists ==
Medal	Name	Class	Event	Date
(gold) Gold	Wen Xiaoyan	T37	Women's long jump T37	27 September
(gold) Gold	Di Dongdong	T11	Men's long jump T11	27 September
(gold) Gold	Zhao Yuping	F12	Women's javelin throw F13	28 September
(gold) Gold	Zou Lijuan	F34	Women's javelin throw F34	29 September
(silver) Silver	Chen Shichang	T11	Men's long jump T11	27 September
(silver) Silver	Shi Kangjun	T46	Men's 100m T47	27 September
(silver) Silver	Tian Yuxin	F57	Women's discus throw F57	28 September
(silver) Silver	Tian Yajuan	T54	Women's 5000m T54	28 September
(silver) Silver	Zuo Caiyun	F34	Women's javelin throw F34	29 September
(silver) Silver	Zhou Hongzhuan	T53	Women's 800m T53	29 September
(silver) Silver	Zhou Zhaoqian	T54	Women's 800m T54	29 September
(silver) Silver	Yao Juan	F44	Women's shot put F44	3 October
(silver) Silver	Zhao Yuping	F12	Women's shot put F12	4 October
(silver) Silver	Wang Jun	F35	Women's shot put F35	4 October
(bronze) Bronze	Wang Hao	T46	Men's long jump T47	28 September
(bronze) Bronze	Mi Na	F37	Women's shot put F37	28 September
(bronze) Bronze	Yao Juan	F44	Women's discus throw F44	29 September
(bronze) Bronze	Lan Hanyu	F34	Women's 800m T34	4 October

=== Summary ===
Medals by events
Sport	Gold	Silver	Bronze	Total
Field	4	6	3	13
Track	0	4	1	5
Total	4	10	4	18

Medals by day
Day	Date	Gold	Silver	Bronze	Total
1	27 September	2	2	0	4
2	28 September	1	2	2	5
3	29 September	1	3	1	5
7	3 October	0	1	0	1
8	4 October	0	2	1	3
	Total	4	10	4	18

Medals by gender
Gender	Gold	Silver	Bronze	Total
Female	3	8	3	14
Male	1	2	1	4
Total	4	10	4	18

Multiple medalists
Name	Class	1st place, gold medalist(s)	2nd place, silver medalist(s)	3rd place, bronze medalist(s)	Total
Zhao Yuping	F12	1	1	0	2
Yao Juan	F44	0	1	1	2

== Track events ==
Legend:

- Note – Ranks given for track events are only within the athlete's heat.
- Q = Qualified for the next round
- q = Qualified for the next round as the fastest loser or, in field events, by position without achieving the qualifying target.
- DSQ = Disqualified
- DNF = Did Not Finish
- WR = World Record
- CR = Championship Record
- AR = Area (or Continental) Record
- PB = Personal Best
- SB = Season's Best

=== Men ===
Athlete	Event	Heats		Semi-final		Final	
Athlete	Event	Result	Rank	Result	Rank	Result	Rank
Chen Shichang	100m T11	11.51 SB	3	Did not advance to next round			
Di Dongdong	100m T11	11.26 SB	2q	11.13 SB	2q	11.11 SB	3rd place, bronze medalist(s)
Ye Tao	100m T11	DNS		Did not advance to next round			
Deng Peicheng	100m T36	12.01 SB	2Q	—N/a		11.77; AS PB	2nd place, silver medalist(s)
Yang Yifei	100m T36	12.23 SB	3Q	—N/a		12.03 SB	3rd place, bronze medalist(s)
Huang Ruihua	100m T44	11.92	5	Did not advance to next round			
Shi Kangjun	100m T47	10.83 PB	2Q	—N/a		10.68 PB	2nd place, silver medalist(s)
Wang Hao	100m T47	10.98 SB	2Q	—N/a		10.92 SB	6
Hu Yang	100m T54	14.18 SB	2Q	—N/a		13.81 PB	2nd place, silver medalist(s)
Zhang Ying	100m T54	14.49 SB	4q	—N/a		14.08 SB	5
Huang Ruihua	200m T44	24.24 PB	4	Did not advance to next round			
Dai Yunqiang	400m T54	46.51 SB	1Q	—N/a			
Hu Yang	400m T54	46.64 SB	3q	—N/a			
Zhang Ying	400m T54	47.19 SB	3	Did not advance to next round			
Wang Yang	800m T34	1:40.12 CR	1Q	—N/a			
Dai Yunqiang	800m T54	1:33.98 SB	1Q	—N/a			
Jin Hua	800m T54	1:30.04; CR SB	1Q	—N/a			
Ma Zhuo	800m T54	1:37.58 SB	5	Did not advance to next round			

=== Women ===
Athlete	Event	Heats		Semi-final		Final	
Athlete	Event	Result	Rank	Result	Rank	Result	Rank
Chen Zimo	100m T38	12.86; AS PB	3Q	—N/a		12.89	6
Yan Jing	100m T47	13.36	7	Did not advance to next round			
Liu Yiming	200m T11	25.55	2q	—N/a			
Shen Yaqin	200m T12	25.20 PB	2q				
Yan Jing	200m T47	27.78	4	Did not advance to next round			
Chen Zimo	400m T38	1:01.04; AS PB	3Q	—N/a			
Zhou Zhaoqian	400m T54	53.26 PB	2Q	—N/a			
Lan Hanyu	800m T34	—N/a				2:05.14; AS SB	3rd place, bronze medalist(s)
Zhou Hongzhuan	800m T53	—N/a				1:47.71 SB	2nd place, silver medalist(s)
Tian Yajuan	800m T54	—N/a				1:50.01 SB	4
Zhou Zhaoqian	800m T54	—N/a				1:49.46 SB	2nd place, silver medalist(s)
Tian Yajuan	5000m T54	—N/a				12:20.21 SB	2nd place, silver medalist(s)

== Field events ==
Legend:

- Note – Ranks given for track events are only within the athlete's heat.
- Q = Qualified for the next round
- q = Qualified for the next round as the fastest loser or, in field events, by position without achieving the qualifying target.
- DSQ = Disqualified
- WR = World Record
- CR = Championship Record
- PB = Personal Best
- SB = Season's Best

=== Men ===
Athlete	Event	Qualification		Final	
Athlete	Event	Result	Rank	Result	Rank
Zeng Yize	High Jump T64	—N/a		1.75	8
Chen Shichang	Long Jump T11	—N/a		6.80 PB	2nd place, silver medalist(s)
Di Dongdong	Long Jump T11	—N/a		6.92; WR PB	1st place, gold medalist(s)
Ye Tao	Long Jump T11	—N/a		4.22 SB	5
Wang Hao	Long Jump T47	—N/a		7.19 SB	3rd place, bronze medalist(s)
Guo Jiangluo	Shot Put F37	—N/a		14.19 PB	5
Wang Wei	Shot Put F40	—N/a		9.77 SB	8

=== Women ===
Athlete	Event	Qualification		Final	
Athlete	Event	Result	Rank	Result	Rank
Li Wei	Discus Throw F41	—N/a		26.59	7
Yao Juan	Discus Throw F44	—N/a		39.23 SB	3rd place, bronze medalist(s)
Tian Yuxin	Discus Throw F57	—N/a		30.30 SB	2nd place, silver medalist(s)
Zhao Yuping	Javelin Throw F13	—N/a		45.22 SB	1st place, gold medalist(s)
Qian Zao	Javelin Throw F34	15.31	2q	15.42	8
Zou Lijuan	Javelin Throw F34	—N/a		21.41; CR SB	1st place, gold medalist(s)
Zuo Caiyun	Javelin Throw F34	—N/a		20.58 PB	2nd place, silver medalist(s)
Huang Yezi	Javelin Throw F46	—N/a		38.67 SB	5
Shi Gaiting	Javelin Throw F46	—N/a		31.04 SB	10
Wen Xiaoyan	Long Jump T37	—N/a		5.32; CR SB	1st place, gold medalist(s)
Yan Jing	Long Jump T47	—N/a		4.61	11
Xue Enhui	Shot Put F12	—N/a		10.76 SB	6
Zhao Yuping	Shot Put F12	—N/a		12.67 SB	2nd place, silver medalist(s)
Wang Jun	Shot Put F35	—N/a		10.43 SB	2nd place, silver medalist(s)
Mi Na	Shot Put F37	—N/a		12.28 SB	3rd place, bronze medalist(s)
Yao Juan	Shot Put F44	—N/a		12.81 SB	2nd place, silver medalist(s)
