= Algeria at the 2025 World Para Athletics Championships =

- IPC code: ALG
- NPC: Algerian National Paralympic Committee

in New Delhi, India September 27, 2025 – October 5, 2025
- Medals: Gold 3 Silver 3 Bronze 3 Total 9

Summer appearances
- 2023; 2024; 2025

Algeria is participating in the 2025 World Para Athletics Championships, being held in New Delhi, India from 27 September to 5 October 2025. The Algerian contingent consists of TBD athletes.

== Track events ==
Legend:

- Note – Ranks given for track events are only within the athlete's heat.
- Q = Qualified for the next round
- q = Qualified for the next round as the fastest loser or, in field events, by position without achieving the qualifying target.
- DSQ = Disqualified
- DNF = Did Not Finish
- WR = World Record
- CR = Championship Record
- PB = Personal Best
- SB = Season Best

=== Men ===
Athlete	Event	Heats		Semi-final		Final	
Athlete	Event	Result	Rank	Result	Rank	Result	Rank
Fakhr Eddine Thelaidjia	100m T36	12.50	9				
Mokhtar Didane	100m T36	12.05	4Q			12.09	5
Fakhr Eddine Thelaidjia	400m T36	54.28 SB	1Q	—N/a		53.75; AR PB	4
Abdelhadi Boudra	1500m T13	4:18.93	4Q	—N/a		4:00.52	5
Abdelhadi Boudra	5000m T13	—N/a				1 Oct; 19:37 IST	

=== Women ===
Athlete	Event	Heats		Semi-final		Final	
Athlete	Event	Result	Rank	Result	Rank	Result	Rank
Rabah Bousaid	1500m T46	—N/a				4:16.72	8

== Field events ==
Legend:

- Note – Ranks given for track events are only within the athlete's heat.
- Q = Qualified for the next round
- q = Qualified for the next round as the fastest loser or, in field events, by position without achieving the qualifying target.
- DSQ = Disqualified
- WR = World Record
- CR = Championship Record
- PB = Personal Best
- SB = Season's Best

=== Men ===
Athlete	Event	Qualification		Final	
Athlete	Event	Result	Rank	Result	Rank
Abdelhak Missouni	Club Throw F32	—N/a		32.96	4
Ahmed Mehideb	Club Throw F32	—N/a		35.77	2nd place, silver medalist(s)
Walid Ferhah	Club Throw F32	—N/a		39.53 SB	1st place, gold medalist(s)
Mokhtar Didane	Long Jump T36	—N/a		5.35 SB	9
Ahmed Mehideb	Shot Put F32	—N/a		1 Oct; 17:10 IST	
Mohamed Nadjib Amchi	Shot Put F32	—N/a		1 Oct; 17:10 IST	
Walid Ferhah	Shot Put F32	—N/a		1 Oct; 17:10 IST	
Kamel Kardjena	Shot Put F33	—N/a		11.09 SB	3rd place, bronze medalist(s)
Hamza Kais	Shot Put F53	—N/a		6.79	6

=== Women ===
Athlete	Event	Qualification		Final	
Athlete	Event	Result	Rank	Result	Rank
Nadjet Boucherf	Club Throw F51	—N/a		14.15; AR PB	5
Asmahan Boudjadar	Javelin Throw F34	14.21 PB	3q	12.48	10
Asmahan Boudjadar	Shot Put F33	—N/a		7.26	4
