= Churkin =

Churkin (Russian: Чуркин, from Чуркин, for an intelligent person) is a Russian masculine surname, its feminine counterpart is Churkina. It may refer to

- Aleksei Churkin (born 1998), Russian Paralympic athlete
- Anzhelika Churkina (born 1969), Ukrainian Paralympic sitting volleyball player
- Denis Churkin (footballer, born 1979), Russian football player
- Denis Churkin (footballer, born 2001), Russian football player
- Olga Churkina, Russian Paralympic pentathlete
- Vitaly Churkin (1952–2017), Russian diplomat
- Vladimir Churkin (1953–2021), Russian football player and coach.
