= New Zealand at the 2025 World Para Athletics Championships =

- IPC code: NZL
- NPC: Paralympics New Zealand
- Website: paralympics.org.nz

in New Delhi, India September 27, 2025 – October 5, 2025
- Competitors: 10
- Medals: Gold 0 Silver 0 Bronze 0 Total 0

Summer appearances
- 2025

New Zealand is participating in the 2025 World Para Athletics Championships, being held in New Delhi, India from 27 September to 5 October 2025. The Kiwi contingent consists of 10 athletes.

== Medalists ==
Medal	Name	Class	Event	Date
(gold) Gold	Lisa Adams	F37	Women's shot put F37	28 September
(gold) Gold	Danielle Aitchison	T36	Women's 100m T36	30 September
(bronze) Bronze	William Stedman	T36	Men's 400m T36	29 September

=== Summary ===
Medals by events
Sport	Gold	Silver	Bronze	Total
Track	1	0	1	2
Field	1	0	0	1
Total	2	0	1	3

Medals by day
Day	Date	Gold	Silver	Bronze	Total
2	28 September	1	0	0	1
3	29 September	0	0	1	1
4	30 September	1	0	0	1
	Total	2	0	1	3

Medals by gender
Gender	Gold	Silver	Bronze	Total
Female	2	0	0	2
Male	0	0	1	1
Total	2	0	1	3

Multiple medalists
Name	Class	1st place, gold medalist(s)	2nd place, silver medalist(s)	3rd place, bronze medalist(s)	Total

== Track events ==
Legend:

- Note – Ranks given for track events are only within the athlete's heat.
- Q = Qualified for the next round
- q = Qualified for the next round as the fastest loser or, in field events, by position without achieving the qualifying target.
- DSQ = Disqualified
- DNF = Did Not Finish
- WR = World Record
- CR = Championship Record
- AR = Area (or Continental) Record
- PB = Personal Best
- SB = Season's Best

=== Men ===
Athlete	Event	Heats		Semi-final		Final	
Athlete	Event	Result	Rank	Result	Rank	Result	Rank
Joseph Smith	100m T37	12.13 SB	5	Did not advance to next round			
Mitchell Joynt	100m T64	11.92	5	Did not advance to next round			
William Stedman	400m T36	55.16	1Q	—N/a		53.05 SB	3rd place, bronze medalist(s)
Michael Whittaker	5000m T13	—N/a				15:38.13	8

=== Women ===
Athlete	Event	Heats		Semi-final		Final	
Athlete	Event	Result	Rank	Result	Rank	Result	Rank
Danielle Aitchison	100m T36	13.98 ~~SB~~	1Q	—N/a		13.43 SB	1st place, gold medalist(s)
Anna Grimaldi	100m T47	12.41	2Q	—N/a		12.29 SB	4
Sarah James	800m T53	—N/a				2:20.65 PB	4

== Field events ==
Legend:

- Note – Ranks given for track events are only within the athlete's heat.
- Q = Qualified for the next round
- q = Qualified for the next round as the fastest loser or, in field events, by position without achieving the qualifying target.
- DSQ = Disqualified
- WR = World Record
- CR = Championship Record
- PB = Personal Best
- SB = Season's Best

=== Men ===
Athlete	Event	Qualification		Final	
Athlete	Event	Result	Rank	Result	Rank

=== Women ===
Athlete	Event	Qualification		Final	
Athlete	Event	Result	Rank	Result	Rank
Lisa Adams	Shot Put F37	—N/a		13.83 SB	1st place, gold medalist(s)
