= Aleksandar Radišić =

Serbian para-athlete (born 1984)

Personal information
- Nationality: Serbian
- Born: 1 March 1984 (age 42)

Sport
- Sport: Para athletics
- Disability class: F51
- Event: Club throw
Medal record
Para athletics
Representing Serbia
World Championships
Gold medal – first place	2025 New Delhi	Club throw F51
Bronze medal – third place	2023 Paris	Club throw F51
European Championships
Bronze medal – third place	2021 Bydgoszcz	Club throw F51

Aleksandar Radišić (born 1 March 1984) is a Serbian para-athlete specializing in club throw. He represented Serbia at the 2024 Summer Paralympics.

== Career ==
Radišić competed at the 2023 World Para Athletics Championships and won a bronze medal in the club throw F51 event with a personal best throw of 31.88 metres. He represented Serbia at the 2024 Summer Paralympics and finished in seventh place in the club throw F51 event with a throw of 31.32 metres.

He competed at the 2025 World Para Athletics Championships and won a gold medal in the club throw F51 event with a throw of 30.36 metres.
