= Simoné Kruger =

South African Paralympic athlete (born 2005)

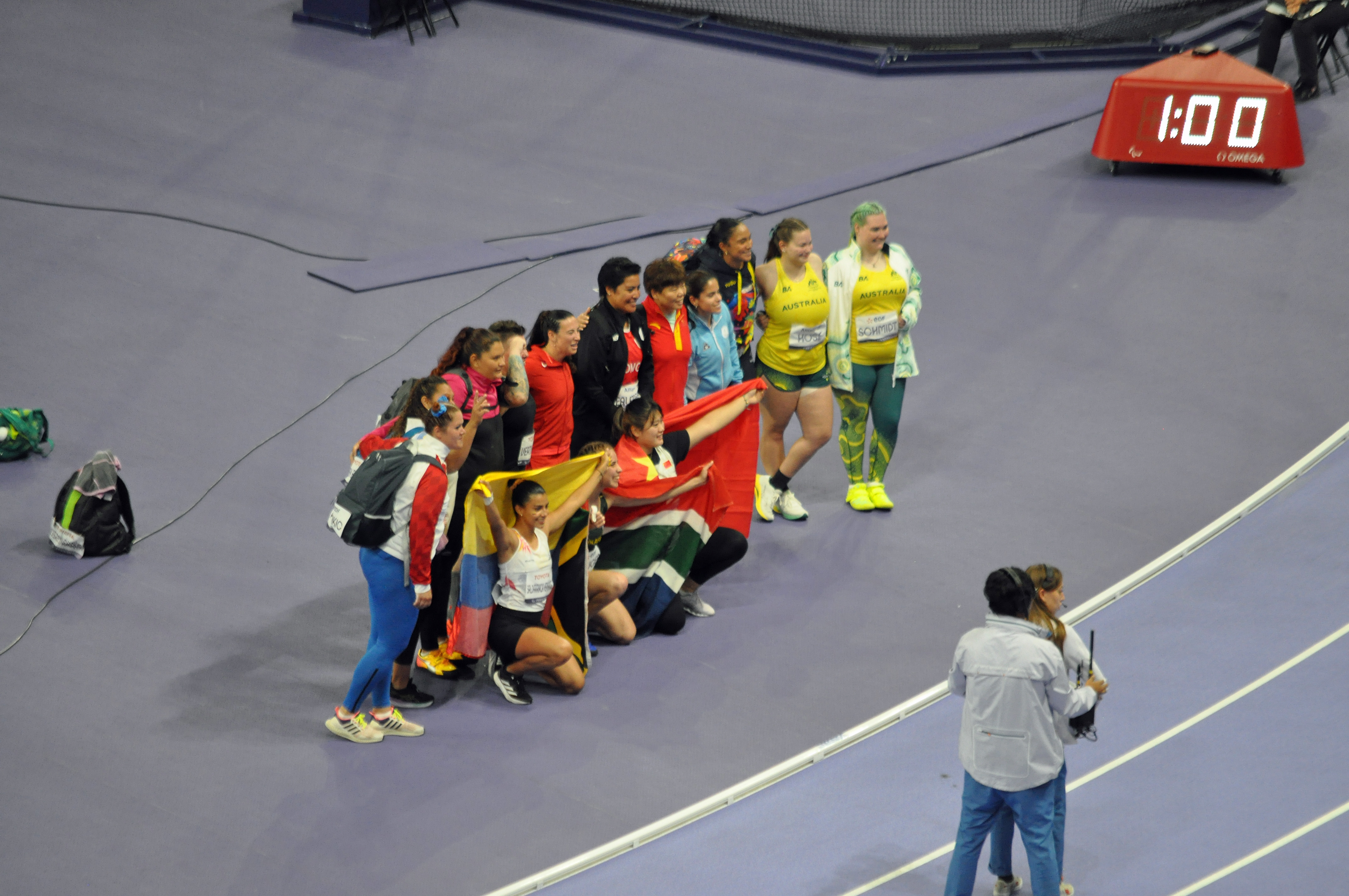
- Xiomara Saldarriaga, Kruger and Li Yingli at the 2024 Paralympics

Personal information
- Born: 14 January 2005 (age 21) Pretoria, South Africa

Sport
- Country: South Africa
- Sport: Paralympic athletics
- Disability: Cerebral palsy
- Disability class: T37
- Event(s): Discus throw Shot put

Achievements and titles
- Personal best: F38 Discus 38.10m WR (2023)
Medal record
Women's para-athletics
Representing South Africa
Paralympic Games
Gold medal – first place	2024 Paris	Discus throw F38
World Championships
Gold medal – first place	2023 Paris	Discus throw F38
Gold medal – first place	2025 New Delhi	Discus throw F38
Silver medal – second place	2019 Dubai	Discus throw F37/38

Simoné Kruger (born 14 January 2005) is a South African Paralympic athlete who competes in discus throw and shot put events at international track and field competitions. She is a World champion in discus throw and competed at the 2020 Summer Paralympics where she finished fifth in the discus throw.
