= 2024 World Para Athletics Championships – Men's club throw =

The men's club throw at the 2024 World Para Athletics Championships were held in Kobe.

== Medalists ==
Event	Gold	Silver	Bronze
F32	Ahmed Mehideb; Algeria	Walid Ferhah; Algeria	Aleksei Churkin; Neutral Paralympic Athletes (NPA)
F51	Željko Dimitrijević; Serbia	Mario Santana Ramos Hernández; Mexico	Dharambir; India
