= Athletics at the 2024 Summer Paralympics – Men's club throw F32 =

Men's Club throw F32 at the XVII Paralympic Games
- Venue: Stade de France
- Dates: 1 September 2024
- Competitors: 9 from 5 nations

Medalists
1st place, gold medalist(s)		Aleksei Churkin	Neutral Paralympic Athletes
2nd place, silver medalist(s)		Athanasios Konstantinidis	Greece
3rd place, bronze medalist(s)		Ahmed Mehideb	Algeria

The Athletics at the 2024 Summer Paralympics – Men's club throw F32 event at the 2024 Summer Paralympics in Paris, took place on 30 August 2024.

== Records ==
Prior to the competition, the existing records were as follows:

F31 Records

World record	Evgenii Demin (RUS)	46.66m	(Russia) Cheboksary	12 August 2023
Paralympic record	No Record Set			

F32 Records

World record	Bo Qing (CHN)	46.66m	(France) Paris	10 July 2023
Paralympic record	Liu Li (CHN)	45.39m	(Japan) Tokyo	28 August 2021

== Results ==
=== Final ===
The final in this classification took place on 1 September 2024:

Rank	Athlete	Nationality	Class	1	2	3	4	5	6	Best	Notes
1st place, gold medalist(s)	Aleksei Churkin	Neutral Paralympic Athletes	F32	40.30	39.42	38.65	38.46	37.02	x	40.30	AR
2nd place, silver medalist(s)	Athanasios Konstantinidis	Greece	F32	36.85	36.88	35.78	35.14	37.62	38.65	38.65	PB
3rd place, bronze medalist(s)	Ahmed Mehideb	Algeria	F32	37.75	38.61	37.78	x	37.08	36.49	38.61	
4	Walid Ferhah	Algeria	F32	37.90	37.12	36.63	37.48	37.99	37.12	37.99	
5	Lazaros Stefanidis	Greece	F32	x	x	x	36.38	x	36.87	36.87	
6	Frantisek Serbus	Czech Republic	F32	30.99	32.52	33.49	32.80	32.28	33.48	33.49	
7	Wassim Salhi	Turkey	F32	33.24	31.91	32.55	x	31.05	32.15	33.24	
8	Abdelhak Missouni	Algeria	F32	x	x	x	32.91	x	31.83	32.91	
9	Dimitrios Zisidis	Greece	F32	23.28	23.52	x	23.28	23.90	23.17	23.90	
