= 2025 World Para Athletics Championships – Universal 4 × 100 metres relay =

The universal 4 × 100 metres relay events at the 2025 World Para Athletics Championships was held at the Jawaharlal Nehru Stadium, Delhi in New Delhi.

== Medalists ==
Event	Gold	Silver	Bronze
Universal	Netherlands; Zara Temmink; Fleur Jong; Stijn van Bergen; Lito Anker	Indonesia; Ni Made Arianti Putri; Nanda Mei Sholihah; Saptoyogo Purnomo; Jaenal Aripin	Australia; Nathan Jason; Lexie Brown; Akeesha Snowden; Luke Bailey

== Universal ==
Final

The event took place on 4 October.

Rank	Lane	Name	Nationality	Time	Notes
1st place, gold medalist(s)	5	Zara Temmink, Fleur Jong, Stijn van Bergen, Lito Anker	Netherlands	47.73	SB
2nd place, silver medalist(s)	3	Ni Made Arianti Putri, Nanda Mei Sholihah, Saptoyogo Purnomo, Jaenal Aripin	Indonesia	47.81	SB
3rd place, bronze medalist(s)	1	Nathan Jason, Lexie Brown, Akeesha Snowden, Luke Bailey	Australia	48.96	OC
4	7	Merve Nur Çağıran, Abdullah Ilgaz, Mehmet Atalay, Hamide Doğangün	Turkey	51.35	SB
