= 2025 World Para Athletics Championships =

Paralympic track and field event

- Host city: New Delhi
- Country: India
- Edition: 12
- Nations: 100
- Athletes: 1182
- Sport: Para-athletics
- Events: 184 (100 men, 83 women, 1 mixed)
- Opening: 27 September 2025
- Closing: 5 October 2025
- Opened by: Narendra Modi; Prime Minister of India
- Main venue: Jawaharlal Nehru Stadium, Delhi

The 2025 World Para Athletics Championships was a para-athletics meet organised by the World Para Athletics of the International Paralympic Committee. This was the 12th edition of the event and was held at Jawaharlal Nehru Stadium in New Delhi from 27 September to 5 October 2025. This was the first time the event was hosted in India.

== Background ==
=== Logo and mascot ===
The logo and mascot for the 2025 edition were unveiled on 20 June 2025. The mascot named Viraaj is a spirited young elephant with a blade prosthesis – is a tribute to strength, optimism, and resilience, while the logo captures India's rich heritage, the spirit of Para athletics and the vibrancy of New Delhi as host city.

=== Medals ===
The front side of the medal features intricate motifs inspired by traditional Indian art, centring on the championship’s name and Para athletics icons: a wheelchair racer, a discus thrower, and the lotus – India's national flower. The other side highlights inclusivity, with Braille above the “New Delhi 2025” inscription, a lotus-inspired pattern, and bold modern geometric details.

== Schedule ==
The competition will be held over 9 days, with two sessions (morning and evening) being conducted each day.

=== Event Summary ===
Participating athletes are given a classification depending on their disabilities (T denotes track events, F denotes field events). They are categorised into seven different classifications:

- T/F11–13: Blind (11) and visually impaired (12–13) athletes; track athletes would often run with a guide.
- T/F20: Athletes who have an intellectual impairment.
- T/F 31–38: Athletes who have cerebral palsy or other coordination impairments. 31–34 for wheelchair events and 35–38 for running events.
- F40–41: Les Autres – typically for athletes who have dwarfism.
- T/F 42–47: Athletes who are amputees. In field events, some athletes would compete in seated events.
- T/F 51–58: Athletes who have a spinal cord injury or disability. In field events, most athletes would compete in seated events.
- T/F 61–64: Athletes who have a prosthesis affected by limb deficiency and leg length difference.
- T/F 71–72: Athletes who have coordination impairments, like athetosis, ataxia, or hypertonia.

2025 World Para Athletics Championships – Men's Events
Classification	Visual Impairment			ID	Cerebral Palsy athletes T32–34 Wheelchair : T35–38 Ambulant							RG		Amputee athletes						Wheelchair athletes Spinal injuries							Prosthesis athletes				CI	
Event	T11	T12	T13	T20	T32	T33	T34	T35	T36	T37	T38	T40	T41	T42	T43	T44	T45	T46	T47	T51	T52	T53	T54	T55	T56	T57	T61	T62	T63	T64	T71	T72
Event	F11	F12	F13	F20	F32	F33	F34	F35	F36	F37	F38	F40	F41	F42	F43	F44	F45	F46	F47	F51	F52	F53	F54	F55	F56	F57	F61	F62	F63	F64	T71	T72
Track events
100 metres	●	●	●			>>	●	●	●	●	●					●	>>	>>	●	●	●	●	●					>>	●	●	●	●
200 metres								●		●						●				●										●		
400 metres	●	●	●	●			●		●	●	●						>>	>>	●	>>	●	●	●					●				●
800 metres				●		>>	●															●	●									
1500 metres	●	>>	●	●						>>	●						>>	●				>>	●									
5000 metres	●	>>	●																			>>	●									
Marathon	>>	●																			>>	>>	●									
Field events
High jump																	>>	>>	●										●	●		
Long jump	●	●	●	●					●	●	●				>>	●	>>	>>	●										●	●		
Shot put	●	●		●	●	●	●	●	●	●		●	●				>>	●				●	>>	●	>>	●	>>		●			
Discus	●									●					>>	●				>>	●		>>	>>	●	●		>>		●		
Javelin		>>	●			>>	●				●	>>	●	>>	>>	●	>>	●				>>	●		>>	●	>>	>>	>>	●		
Club throw					●															●												

2025 World Para Athletics Championships – Women's Events
Classification	Visual Impairment			ID	Cerebral Palsy athletes T32–34 Wheelchair : T35–38 Ambulant							RG		Amputee athletes						Wheelchair athletes Spinal injuries							Prosthesis athletes				CI	
Event	T11	T12	T13	T20	T32	T33	T34	T35	T36	T37	T38	T40	T41	T42	T43	T44	T45	T46	T47	T51	T52	T53	T54	T55	T56	T57	T61	T62	T63	T64	T71	T72
Event	F11	F12	F13	F20	F32	F33	F34	F35	F36	F37	F38	F40	F41	F42	F43	F44	F45	F46	F47	F51	F52	F53	F54	F55	F56	F57	F61	F62	F63	F64	T71	T72
Track events
100 metres	●	●	●			>>	●	●	●	●	●				>>	●	>>	>>	●			●	●					>>	●	●	●	●
200 metres	●	●						●	●	●							>>	>>	●											●		
400 metres	●	●	●	●						●	●						>>	>>	●			●	●									
800 metres						>>	●															●	●									
1500 metres	●	>>	●	●																		>>	●									
5000 metres																						>>	●									
Marathon	>>	●																			>>	>>	●									
Field events
Long Jump	●	●		●						●	●						>>	>>	●								>>		●	●		
Shot Put	>>	●		●	●	●	●	●		●		●	●				>>	●					●		>>	●		>>	>>	●		
Discus	●									>>	●	>>	●							>>	>>	●	>>	●	>>	●		>>		●		
Javelin		>>	●			>>	●										>>	●				>>	●	>>	●							
Club throw					●																											

2025 World Para Athletics Championships - Universal
Classification	Visual Impairment			ID	Cerebral Palsy athletes T32-34 Wheelchair : T35-38 Ambulant							RG		Amputee athletes						Wheelchair athletes Spinal injuries							Prosthesis athletes			
Event	T11	T12	T13	T20	T32	T33	T34	T35	T36	T37	T38	T40	T41	T42	T43	T44	T45	T46	T47	T51	T52	T53	T54	T55	T56	T57	T61	T62	T63	T64
4 × 100 metres relay	>>	>>	>>			>>	>>	>>	>>	>>	>>			>>	>>	>>	>>	>>	>>	>>	>>	>>	>>				>>	>>	>>	●

Key:
- ID : Classifications for intellectual disability
- RG : Les Autres classification, including dwarfism and restricted growth
- ● : Event in this classification
- >> : Competitors in this classification may take part in event for the next competed classification, e.g. T33 may compete in T34 event, or both T45 and T46 athletes may compete in a T47 event.

=== Dates ===
●	Finals

September / October	27	28	29	30	1	2	3	4	5
Events	13	21	18	24	22	18	24	17	27
Cumulative Total	13	34	52	76	98	116	140	157	184

== Participating Nations ==
=== Nations ===
100 Nations, 1182 Athletes (742 Men, 440 Women)

1. Algeria (16)
2. Angola (2)
3. Armenia (5)
4. Argentina (8)
5. Australia (49)
6. Austria (5)
7. Azerbaijan (2)
8. Bahrain (4)
9. Bangladesh (3)
10. Belgium (9)
11. Bermuda (1)
12. Botswana (7)
13. Bahrain (4)
14. Bulgaria (2)
15. Brazil (49)
16. Canada (25)
17. Chile (4)
18. China (57)
19. Great Britain (34)
20. India (73) [Hosts]
21. Ireland (3)
22. Iran (19)
23. Japan (31)
24. Kenya (20)
25. Mexico (27)
26. Namibia (8)
27. New Zealand (10)
28. Qatar (4)
29. South Africa (5)
30. United Arab Emirates (6)
31. United States (39)
32. Ukraine (20)
33. Uzbekistan (35)
34. Venezuela (7)
35. Zimbabwe (1)
36. Cameroon (11)
37. Colombia (16)
38. Costa Rica (3)
39. Croatia (13)
40. Cuba (8)
41. Cyprus (2)
42. Czech Republic (15)
43. Denmark (7)
44. Dominican Republic (4)
45. Ecuador (10)
46. Egypt (3)
47. Spain (27)
48. Estonia (4)
49. Finland (7)
50. France (26)
51. Georgia (2)
52. Germany (20)
53. Ghana (3)
54. Greece (21)
55. Guatemala (2)
56. Hong Kong (2)
57. Hungary (4)
58. Indonesia (12)
59. Ireland (3)
60. Iraq (5)
61. Iceland (2)
62. Italy (13)
63. Jordan (3)
64. Kazakhstan (6)
65. South Korea (7)
66. Kuwait (2)
67. Laos (1)
68. Latvia (4)
69. Libya (1)
70. Lithuania (18)
71. Morocco (6)
72. Malaysia (7)
73. Moldova (9)
74. Mongolia (3)
75. Mauritius (11)
76. Netherlands (13)
77. Nepal (2)
78. Norway (6)
79. Neutral Paralympic Athletes (77) - Russia + Belarus
80. Oman (2)
81. Panama (4)
82. Peru (5)
83. Philippines (6)
84. Poland (29)
85. Portugal (16)
86. Puerto Rico (4)
87. Romania (4)
88. RPT (1) - Refugee
89. Singapore (3)
90. Slovenia (1)
91. Serbia (6)
92. Sri Lanka (5)
93. Switzerland (7)
94. Slovakia (3)
95. Sweden (5)
96. Thailand (13)
97. Chinese Taipei (2)
98. Trinidad and Tobago (1)
99. Tunisia (10)
100. Turkey (28)
101. Uganda (6)

=== NOA ===
Number of athletes by National Paralympic Committee (NOA)

Ranking	NPC	Athletes
1	NPA	77
2	India	73
3	China	57
4	Brazil	49
5	Australia	49
6	United States	39
7	Uzbekistan	35
8	United Kingdom	34
9	Japan	31
10	Poland	29
11	Turkey	28
12	Mexico	27
13	Spain	27
14	France	26
15	Canada	25
16	Greece	21
17	Kenya	20
18	United Kingdom	20
19	Germany	20
20	Iran	19

== Medal table ==
* Host nation (India)

Rank	Nation	Gold	Silver	Bronze	Total
1	Brazil	15	20	9	44
2	China	13	22	17	52
–	Neutral Paralympic Athletes	11	16	19	46
3	Iran	9	2	4	15
4	Netherlands	8	3	1	12
5	Poland	8	2	6	16
6	Colombia	7	10	4	21
7	Great Britain & N.I.	7	5	13	25
8	Italy	7	1	3	11
9	United States	6	9	12	27
10	India*	6	9	7	22
11	Germany	6	2	3	11
12	Thailand	6	2	2	10
13	Switzerland	6	1	2	9
14	Ukraine	5	5	5	15
15	Uzbekistan	5	5	2	12
16	Japan	4	8	2	14
17	Belgium	4	2	0	6
18	Algeria	3	3	3	9
19	Spain	3	2	5	10
20	New Zealand	3	2	2	7
21	Mexico	3	1	6	10
22	Canada	3	1	5	9
23	Ecuador	3	1	1	5
24	Latvia	3	1	0	4
25	Ireland	3	0	0	3
26	Turkey	2	7	1	10
27	Australia	2	6	5	13
28	Tunisia	2	4	3	9
29	Argentina	2	1	0	3
30	Croatia	2	0	2	4
30	South Africa	2	0	2	4
32	Saudi Arabia	1	3	1	5
33	Greece	1	1	4	6
34	Portugal	1	1	2	4
35	Cuba	1	1	1	3
35	Hungary	1	1	1	3
35	Serbia	1	1	1	3
38	Mauritius	1	1	0	2
39	Malaysia	1	0	2	3
40	Morocco	1	0	1	2
40	Norway	1	0	1	2
40	Peru	1	0	1	2
40	United Arab Emirates	1	0	1	2
44	Bulgaria	1	0	0	1
44	Libya	1	0	0	1
44	Refugee Paralympic Team	1	0	0	1
47	France	0	5	1	6
48	Indonesia	0	3	1	4
49	Kenya	0	2	0	2
50	Denmark	0	1	3	4
50	Iraq	0	1	3	4
52	Costa Rica	0	1	1	2
52	Czech Republic	0	1	1	2
52	Lithuania	0	1	1	2
52	South Korea	0	1	1	2
56	Angola	0	1	0	1
56	Finland	0	1	0	1
56	Jordan	0	1	0	1
56	Kuwait	0	1	0	1
56	Namibia	0	1	0	1
56	Trinidad and Tobago	0	1	0	1
62	Sri Lanka	0	0	2	2
63	Botswana	0	0	1	1
63	Kazakhstan	0	0	1	1
63	Venezuela	0	0	1	1
Totals (65 entries)		184	184	179	547

== Placing Table ==
Points were awarded for each athlete finishing in the top 8 of their competition, on a 8 to 1 point scale.

Rank	Name (country)	Points	Athletes	Events
1	China	471	57	
2	Brazil	391	49	
3	United States	311	39	
4	India	299	73	
5	Great Britain	252	34	
6	Australia	204	49	
7	Poland	168	29	
8	Colombia	167	16	
9	Japan	160	31	
10	Uzbekistan	159	35	
11	Mexico	145	27	
12	Turkey	140	28	
13	Ukraine	138	20	
14	Iran	133	19	
15	Germany	130	20	
16	Spain	121	27	
17	Netherlands	120	13	
18	France	116	26	
19	Canada	112	25	
20	Italy	109	13	
Total (94 Nations)		-	1182	184

== Medalists ==
=== Men ===
==== Track ====
Event	Class	Gold	Silver	Bronze
100 metres	T11	Athanasios Ghavelas; Greece	Ananias Shikongo; Namibia	Di Dongdong; China
100 metres	T12	Salum Ageze Kashafali; Norway	Ryutaro Kuno; Japan	Kesley Teodoro; Brazil
100 metres	T13	Shuta Kawakami; Japan	Chad Perris; Australia	Fabrício Barros; Brazil
100 metres	T34	Chaiwat Rattana; Thailand	Rheed McCracken; Australia	Mohamad Othman; United Arab Emirates
100 metres	T35	Artem Kalashian; Neutral Paralympic Athletes	David Dzhatiev; Neutral Paralympic Athletes	Dmitrii Safronov; Neutral Paralympic Athletes
100 metres	T36	Kirill Glazyrin; Neutral Paralympic Athletes	Deng Peicheng; China	Yang Yifei; China
100 metres	T37	Ricardo Gomes de Mendonça; Brazil	Christian Gabriel Costa; Brazil	Saptoyogo Purnomo; Indonesia
100 metres	T38	Jaydin Blackwell; United States	Ryan Medrano; United States	Thomas Young; Great Britain
100 metres	T44	Naif Almasrahi; Saudi Arabia	Matheus de Lima; Brazil	Marco Cicchetti; Italy
100 metres	T47	Petrúcio Ferreira; Brazil	Shi Kangjun; China	Aymane El Haddaoui; Morocco
100 metres	T51	Peter Genyn; Belgium	Roger Habsch; Belgium	Edgar Cesareo Navarro; Mexico
100 metres	T52	Anthony Bouchard; Canada	Tomoki Sato; Japan	Fabian Blum; Switzerland
100 metres	T53	Pongsakorn Paeyo; Thailand	Abdulrahman Alqurashi; Saudi Arabia	Yoo Byung-hoon; South Korea
100 metres	T54	Athiwat Paeng-nuea; Thailand	Hu Yang; China	Mamudo Balde; Portugal
100 metres	T63	Puseletso Mabote; South Africa	Partin; Indonesia	Daniel Jørgensen; Denmark
100 metres	T64	Felix Streng; Germany	Johannes Floors; Germany	Sherman Guity; Costa Rica
100 metres	T71	Artur Krzyzek; Poland	Vinícius Cabral; Brazil	—N/a
100 metres	T72	Carlo Calcagni; Italy	João Matos Cunha; Brazil	Finlay Menzies; Great Britain
200 metres	T35	David Dzhatiev; Neutral Paralympic Athletes	Dmitrii Safronov; Neutral Paralympic Athletes	Ihor Tsvietov; Ukraine
200 metres	T37	Ricardo Gomes de Mendonça; Brazil	Bartolomeu Chaves; Brazil	Andrey Vdovin; Neutral Paralympic Athletes
200 metres	T44	Marco Cicchetti; Italy	Pavlo Kaplun; Ukraine	Sandeep; India
200 metres	T51	Peter Genyn; Belgium	Roger Habsch; Belgium	Edgar Cesareo Navarro; Mexico
200 metres	T64	Felix Streng; Germany	Sherman Guity; Costa Rica	Francesco Loragno; Italy
400 metres	T11	Guillaume Junior Atangana; Refugee Paralympic Team	Gauthier Makunda; France	Mohammed Ayade; Iraq
400 metres	T12	Fakhriddin Khamraev; Uzbekistan	Oguz Akbulut; Turkey	Kissanapong Tisuwan; Thailand
400 metres	T13	Max Marzillier; Germany	Ryota Fukunaga; Japan	Bose Mokgwathi; Botswana
400 metres	T20	David Jose Pineda Mejia; Spain	Daniel Tavares Martins; Brazil	Idris Sufyani; Saudi Arabia
400 metres	T34	Chaiwat Rattana; Thailand	Rheed McCracken; Australia	Austin Smeenk; Canada
400 metres	T36	James Turner; Australia	Kirill Glazyrin; Neutral Paralympic Athletes	William Stedman; New Zealand
400 metres	T37	Bartolomeu Chaves; Brazil	Anton Feoktistov; Neutral Paralympic Athletes	Yeferson Suárez; Colombia
400 metres	T38	Jaydin Blackwell; United States	José Ramírez; Colombia	Alexandros Diamantis Skourtis; Greece
400 metres	T47	Aymane El Haddaoui; Morocco	Thomaz Ruan de Moraes; Brazil	Collen Mahlalela; South Africa
400 metres	T52	Tomoki Sato; Japan	Hirokazu Ueyonabaru; Japan	Tomoya Ito; Japan
400 metres	T53	Pongsakorn Paeyo; Thailand	Yoo Byung-hoon; South Korea	Vitalii Gritsenko; Neutral Paralympic Athletes
400 metres	T54	Yassine Gharbi; Tunisia	Athiwat Paeng-nuea; Thailand	Dai Yunqiang; China
400 metres	T62	Johannes Floors; Germany	Olivier Hendriks; Netherlands	Konstantinos Tourkochoritis; Greece
400 metres	T72	Carlo Calcagni; Italy	João Matos Cunha; Brazil	Piotr Siejwa; Poland
800 metres	T20	Ndiaga Dieng; Italy	Meshal Mahutan; Saudi Arabia	Mehmet Emin Eğilmez; Turkey
800 metres	T34	Wang Yang; China	Chaiwat Rattana; Thailand	Austin Smeenk; Canada
800 metres	T53	Pongsakorn Paeyo; Thailand	Mohamed Nidhal Khelifi; Tunisia	Vitalii Gritsenko; Neutral Paralympic Athletes
800 metres	T54	Jin Hua; China	Dai Yunqiang; China	Yassine Gharbi; Tunisia
1500 metres	T11	Yeltsin Jacques; Brazil	Júlio Cesar Agripino; Brazil	Fedor Rudakov; Neutral Paralympic Athletes
1500 metres	T13	Joel Gomez; United States	Aleksandr Kostin; Neutral Paralympic Athletes	Jaryd Clifford; Australia
1500 metres	T20	Michael Brannigan; United States	Natsuki Toda; Japan	Sandro Baessa; Portugal
1500 metres	T38	Nate Tucker; Canada	Amen Allah Tissaoui; Tunisia	Angus Hincksman; Australia
1500 metres	T46	Aleksandr Iaremchuk; Neutral Paralympic Athletes	Antoine Praud; France	Pradeep Puwakpitikande; Sri Lanka
1500 metres	T52	Tomoki Sato; Japan	Hirokazu Ueyonabaru; Japan	Leonardo de Jesús Pérez Juárez; Mexico
1500 metres	T54	Jin Hua; China	Luo Xingchuan; China	Nathan Maguire; Great Britain
5000 metres	T11	Kenya Karasawa; Japan	Yeltsin Jacques; Brazil	Darwin Castro; Ecuador
5000 metres	T13	Aleksandr Kostin; Neutral Paralympic Athletes	Abdelhadi Boudra; Algeria	Jean Oliveira da Silva; Brazil
5000 metres	T54	Marcel Hug; Switzerland	Thibault Daurat; France	Putharet Khongrak; Thailand

==== Field ====
Event	Class	Gold	Silver	Bronze
High jump	T47	Nishad Kumar; India	Abdullah Ilgaz; Turkey	Roderick Townsend; United States
High jump	T63	Shailesh Kumar; India	Ezra Frech; United States	Varun Singh Bhati; India
High jump	T64	Temurbek Giyazov; Uzbekistan	Jonathan Broom-Edwards; Great Britain	Praveen Kumar; India
Long jump	T11	Di Dongdong; China	Chen Shichang; China	Maksim Shavrikov; Neutral Paralympic Athletes
Long jump	T12	Fernando Vázquez; Argentina	Ihar Sauchuk; Neutral Paralympic Athletes	Andreas Walser; Germany
Long jump	T13	Iván Cano; Spain	Ryota Fukunaga; Japan	Vegard Dragsund Sverd; Norway
Long jump	T20	Abdul Latif Romly; Malaysia	Hassan Dawshi; Saudi Arabia	Matvei Iakushev; Neutral Paralympic Athletes
Long jump	T36	Evgenii Torsunov; Neutral Paralympic Athletes	William Stedman; New Zealand	Oleksandr Lytvynenko; Ukraine
Long jump	T37	Brian Lionel Impellizzeri; Argentina	Sergei Biriukov; Neutral Paralympic Athletes [[|]]	Muhammad Nazmi Nasri; Malaysia
Long jump	T38	Bartosz Sienkiewicz; Poland	Juan Gómez Coa; Colombia	Zhong Huanghao; China
Long jump	T44	Marco Cicchetti; Italy	Dzmitry Bartashevich; Neutral Paralympic Athletes [[|]]	Nuwan Indika; Sri Lanka
Long jump	T47	Robiel Yankiel Sol Cervantes; Cuba	Nikita Kotukov; Neutral Paralympic Athletes [[|]]	Wang Hao; China
Long jump	T63	Joel de Jong; Netherlands	Léon Schäfer; Germany	Daniel Wagner; Denmark
Long jump	T64	Markus Rehm; Germany	Derek Loccident; United States	Jarryd Wallace; United States
Shot put	F11	Amirhossein Alipour Darbeid; Iran	Mahdi Olad; Iran	Álvaro del Amo Cano; Spain
Shot put	F12	Volodymyr Ponomarenko; Ukraine	Emils Dzilna; Latvia	Stefan Dimitrijević; Serbia
Shot put	F20	Oleksandr Yarovyi; Ukraine	Maksym Koval; Ukraine	Muhammad Ziyad Zolkefli; Malaysia
Shot put	F32	Jasur Khodjaev; Uzbekistan	Athanasios Konstantinidis; Greece	Mohamed Nadjib Amchi; Algeria
Shot put	F33	Deni Cerni; Croatia	Aleksandr Khrupin; Neutral Paralympic Athletes [[|]]	Kamel Kardjena; Algeria
Shot put	F34	Mehran Nikoee Majd; Iran	Ahmad Hindi; Jordan	Mauricio Valencia; Colombia
Shot put	F35	Seyed Aliasghar Javanmardi; Iran	Hernan Emanuel Urra; Argentina	Fu Xinhan; China
Shot put	F36	Vladimir Sviridov; Neutral Paralympic Athletes [[|]]	Yassine Guenichi; Tunisia	Alan Kokoity; Neutral Paralympic Athletes [[|]]
Shot put	F37	Albert Khinchagov; Neutral Paralympic Athletes [[|]]	Aleksandr Belobokov; Neutral Paralympic Athletes [[|]]	Tolibboy Yuldashev; Uzbekistan
Shot put	F38	Levin Moreno; Colombia	José Lemos; Colombia	Michael Jenkins; Great Britain
Shot put	F40	Denis Gnezdilov; Neutral Paralympic Athletes [[|]]	Miguel Monteiro; Portugal	Garrah Tnaiash; Egypt
Shot put	F41	Niko Kappel; Germany	Bobirjon Omonov; Uzbekistan	Aiaal Sivtsev; Neutral Paralympic Athletes [[|]]
Shot put	F46	Greg Stewart; Canada	Joshua Cinnamo; United States	Luka Bakovic; Croatia
Shot put	F53	Bartosz Górczak; Poland	Aleš Kisý; Czech Republic	Viacheslav Kaleev; Neutral Paralympic Athletes [[|]]
Shot put	F55	Ruzhdi Ruzhdi; Bulgaria	Nebojša Đurić; Serbia	Lech Stoltman; Poland
Shot put	F57	Yasin Khosravi; Iran	Thiago Paulino dos Santos; Brazil	Soman Rana; India
Shot put	F63	Aled Davies; Great Britain	Faisal Sorour; Kuwait	Edenilson Floriani; Brazil
Discus throw	F11	Hassan Bajoulvand; Iran	Alessandro Rodrigo Silva; Brazil	Álvaro del Amo Cano; Spain
Discus throw	F37	Luis Carlos López Valenzuela; Mexico	Yamato Shimbo; Japan	Mykola Zhabnyak; Ukraine
Discus throw	F44	Andrés Mosquera; Colombia	Akeem Stewart; Trinidad and Tobago	Dan Greaves; Great Britain
Discus throw	F52	Aigars Apinis; Latvia	André Rocha; Brazil	Velimir Sandor; Croatia
Discus throw	F56	Claudiney Batista; Brazil	Yogesh Kathuniya; India	Konstantinos Tzounis; Greece
Discus throw	F57	Mahmoud Rajab; Libya	Thiago Paulino dos Santos; Brazil	Atul Kaushik; India
Discus throw	F64	Ivan Katanusic; Croatia	Max Rohn; United States	Pardeep Kumar; India
Javelin throw	F13	Daniel Pembroke; Great Britain	Ulicer Aguilera Cruz; Cuba	Héctor Cabrera; Spain
Javelin throw	F34	Saeid Afrooz; Iran	Diego Meneses; Colombia	Mauricio Valencia; Colombia
Javelin throw	F38	José Lemos; Colombia	Luis Fernando Lucumí Villegas; Colombia	Vladyslav Bilyi; Ukraine
Javelin throw	F41	Sadegh Beit Sayah; Iran	Navdeep Singh; India	Sun Pengxiang; China
Javelin throw	F44	Sandip Sanjay Sargar; India	Sandeep Chaudhary; India	Edenilson Floriani; Brazil
Javelin throw	F46	Rinku Hooda; India	Sundar Singh Gurjar; India	Guillermo Varona; Cuba
Javelin throw	F54	Ali Baziyarshoorijeh; Iran	Ivan Revenko; Neutral Paralympic Athletes [[|]]	Erfan Bondori Deraznoei; Iran
Javelin throw	F57	Mohammad Khalvandi; Turkey	Yorkinbek Odilov; Uzbekistan	Amanolah Papi; Iran
Javelin throw	F64	Sumit Antil; India	Tomás Soto; Colombia	Rufat Khabibullin; Kazakhstan
Club throw	F32	Walid Ferhah; Algeria	Ahmed Mehideb; Algeria	Frantisek Serbus; Czech Republic
Club throw	F51	Aleksandar Radišić; Serbia	Dharambir Nain; India	Uladzislau Hryb; Neutral Paralympic Athletes [[|]]

=== Women ===
==== Track ====
Event	Class	Gold	Silver	Bronze
100 metres	T11	Jerusa Geber; Brazil	Liu Yiming; China	Alba García Falagán; Spain
100 metres	T12	Simran Sharma; India	Liang Yanfen; China	Nagore Folgado García; Spain
100 metres	T13	Orla Comerford; Ireland	Rayane Soares da Silva; Brazil	Kym Crosby; United States
100 metres	T34	Hannah Cockroft; Great Britain	Karé Adenegan; Great Britain	Lan Hanyu; China
100 metres	T35	Guo Qianqian; China	Preethi Pal; India	Fatimah Suwaed; Iraq
100 metres	T36	Danielle Aitchison; New Zealand	Mali Lovell; Australia	Veronica Hipólito; Brazil
100 metres	T37	Wen Xiaoyan; China	Taylor Swanson; United States	Viktoriia Slanova; Neutral Paralympic Athletes [[|]]
100 metres	T38	Angie Mejía; Colombia	Karen Palomeque; Colombia	Lida-Maria Manthopoulou; Greece
100 metres	T44	Victoria Levitt; Great Britain	Annie Carey; United States	Bebe Jackson; Great Britain
100 metres	T47	Kiara Rodríguez; Ecuador	Maria Clara Augusto; Brazil	Marie Ngoussou-Ngouyi; France
100 metres	T53	Catherine Debrunner; Switzerland	Hamide Doğangün; Turkey	Zhou Hongzhuan; China
100 metres	T54	Noemi Alphonse; Mauritius	Zübeyde Süpürgeci; Turkey	Zhou Zhaoqian; China
100 metres	T63	Ambra Sabatini; Italy	Karisma Evi Tiarani; Indonesia	Ndidikama Okoh; Great Britain
100 metres	T64	Fleur Jong; Netherlands	Marlene van Gansewinkel; Netherlands	Marissa Papaconstantinou; Canada
100 metres	T71	Thekra Al Kaabi; United Arab Emirates	Bella Morkus; Lithuania	Miriam Dominikowska; Poland
100 metres	T72	Magdalena Andruszkiewicz; Poland	Judith Tortosa Vila; Spain	Zofia Kalucka; Poland
200 metres	T11	Jerusa Geber; Brazil	Liu Yiming; China	Thalita Simplício; Brazil
200 metres	T12	Clara Daniele Barros da Silva; Brazil	Simran Sharma; India	Shen Yaqin; China
200 metres	T13	Orla Comerford; Ireland	Rayane Soares da Silva; Brazil	Kym Crosby; United States
200 metres	T35	Guo Qianqian; China	Fatimah Suwaed; Iraq	Preethi Pal; India
200 metres	T36	Danielle Aitchison; New Zealand	Mali Lovell; Australia	Cheyenne Bouthoorn; Netherlands
200 metres	T37	Wen Xiaoyan; China	Nataliia Kobzar; Ukraine	Taylor Swanson; United States
200 metres	T38	Karen Palomeque; Colombia	Angie Mejía; Colombia	Luca Ekler; Hungary
200 metres	T44	Annie Carey; United States	Victoria Levitt; Great Britain	—N/a
200 metres	T47	Kiara Rodríguez; Ecuador	Maria Clara Augusto; Brazil	Anna Grimaldi; New Zealand
200 metres	T64	Marlene van Gansewinkel; Netherlands	Marissa Papaconstantinou; Canada	Sydney Barta; United States
400 metres	T11	Thalita Simplício; Brazil	Juliana Ngleya Moko; Angola	Melissa Baldera; Peru
400 metres	T12	Anna Kulinich-Sorokina; Neutral Paralympic Athletes [[|]]	Hajar Safarzadeh; Iran	Alejandra Paola Pérez López; Venezuela
400 metres	T13	Carolina Duarte; Portugal	Mariia Ulianenko; Neutral Paralympic Athletes [[|]]	Mana Sasaki; Japan
400 metres	T20	Aysel Önder; Turkey	Deepthi Jeevanji; India	Yuliia Shuliar; Ukraine
400 metres	T34	Hannah Cockroft; Great Britain	Karé Adenegan; Great Britain	—N/a
400 metres	T37	Nataliia Kobzar; Ukraine	Viktoriia Slanova; Neutral Paralympic Athletes [[|]]	Sheryl James; South Africa
400 metres	T38	Karen Palomeque; Colombia	Chen Zimo; China	Lindy Ave; Germany
400 metres	T47	Maria Clara Augusto; Brazil	Anastasiia Soloveva; Neutral Paralympic Athletes [[|]]	Jule Ross; Germany
400 metres	T53	Catherine Debrunner; Switzerland	Hamide Doğangün; Turkey	Zhou Hongzhuan; China
400 metres	T54	Léa Bayekula; Belgium	Zhou Zhaoqian; China	Hannah Dederick; United States
400 metres	T72	Magdalena Andruszkiewicz; Poland	Andrea Stokholm Overgaard; Denmark	Edileusa dos Santos; Brazil
800 metres	T34	Hannah Cockroft; Great Britain	Kare Adenegan; Great Britain	Lan Hanyu; China
800 metres	T53	Catherine Debrunner; Switzerland	Zhou Hongzhuan; China	—N/a
800 metres	T54	Léa Bayekula; Belgium	Zhou Zhaoqian; China	Melanie Woods; Great Britain
1500 metres	T11	Neri Mamani; Peru	Nancy Chelangat Koech; Kenya	Joanna Mazur; Poland
1500 metres	T13	Greta Streimikyte; Ireland	Izaskun Osés Ayúcar; Spain	Elena Pautova; Neutral Paralympic Athletes [[|]]
1500 metres	T20	Antônia Keyla Barros; Brazil	Barbara Bieganowska-Zając; Poland	Annabelle Colman; Australia
1500 metres	T54	Catherine Debrunner; Switzerland	Zhou Zhaoqian; China	Melanie Woods; Great Britain
5000 metres	T54	Catherine Debrunner; Switzerland	Tian Yajuan; China	Patricia Eachus; Switzerland

==== Field ====
Event	Class	Gold	Silver	Bronze
Long jump	T11	Alba García Falagán; Spain	Tiffany Logette-Lods; France	Arjola Dedaj; Italy
Long jump	T12	Yokutkhon Kholbekova; Uzbekistan	Iida Lounela; Finland	Lynda Hamri; Algeria
Long jump	T20	Zileide Cassiano; Brazil	Fatma Damla Altın; Turkey	Karolina Kucharczyk; Poland
Long jump	T37	Wen Xiaoyan; China	Anais Angeline; Mauritius	Jaleen Roberts; United States
Long jump	T38	Luca Ekler; Hungary	Angie Mejía; Colombia	Karen Palomeque; Colombia
Long jump	T47	Kiara Rodriguez; Ecuador	Petra Luteran; Hungary	Bjørk Nørremark; Denmark
Long jump	T63	Vanessa Low; Australia	Elena Kratter; Switzerland	Noelle Lambert-Beirne; United States
Long jump	T64	Fleur Jong; Netherlands	Kiki Hendriks; Netherlands	Beatriz Hatz; United States
Shot put	F12	Assunta Legnante; Italy	Zhao Yuping; China	Lydia Church; Great Britain
Shot put	F20	Sabrina Fortune; Great Britain	Ebrar Keskin; Turkey	Aleksandra Zaitseva; Neutral Paralympic Athletes [[|]]
Shot put	F32	Wanna Brito; Brazil	Anastasiia Moskalenko; Ukraine	Evgeniia Galaktionova; Neutral Paralympic Athletes [[|]]
Shot put	F33	Svetlana Krivenok; Neutral Paralympic Athletes [[|]]	Wu Qing; China	Julia Hanes; Canada
Shot put	F34	Zou Lijuan; China	Lucyna Kornobys; Poland	Galina Lipatnikova; Neutral Paralympic Athletes [[|]]
Shot put	F35	Mariia Pomazan; Ukraine	Wang Jun; China	Anna Nicholson; Great Britain
Shot put	F36	Cheyenne Bouthoorn; Netherlands	Kirra Wright; Australia	—N/a
Shot put	F37	Lisa Adams; New Zealand	Irina Vertinskaya; Neutral Paralympic Athletes [[|]]	Mi Na; China
Shot put	F40	Lara Baars; Netherlands	Madina Mukhtorova; Uzbekistan	Raja Jebali; Tunisia
Shot put	F41	Mayerli Buitrago Ariza; Colombia	Kubaro Khakimova; Uzbekistan	Raoua Tlili; Tunisia
Shot put	F44	Arelle Middleton; United States	Yao Juan; China	Funmi Oduwaiye; Great Britain
Shot put	F46	Karomat Omonova; Uzbekistan	Holly Robinson; New Zealand	Katie Pegg; Canada
Shot put	F54	Gloria Zarza; Mexico	Elizabeth Rodrigues Gomes; Brazil	Elham Salehi; Iran
Shot put	F57	Safia Djelal; Algeria	Nassima Saifi; Algeria	Tian Yuxin; China
Shot put	F64	Faustyna Kotlowska; Poland	Alexandra Nouchet; France	Alicia Guerrero; United States
Discus throw	F11	Xue Enhui; China	Assunta Legnante; Italy	Oksana Dobrovolskaja; Lithuania
Discus throw	F38	Simoné Kruger; South Africa	Mi Na; China	Li Yingli; China
Discus throw	F41	Raoua Tlili; Tunisia	Estefany López; Ecuador	Navruza Akhmatova; Uzbekistan
Discus throw	F44	Osiris Machado; Mexico	Samantha Heyison; United States	Yao Juan; China
Discus throw	F53	Elizabeth Rodrigues Gomes; Brazil	Zoia Ovsii; Ukraine	Elena Gorlova; Neutral Paralympic Athletes [[|]]
Discus throw	F55	Diāna Krumina; Latvia	Érica Castaño; Colombia	María Guadalupe Navarro Hernández; Mexico
Discus throw	F57	Nassima Saifi; Algeria	Tian Yuxin; China	Floralia Estrada; Mexico
Discus throw	F64	Faustyna Kotłowska; Poland	Jessica Heims; United States	Alicia Guerrero; United States
Javelin throw	F13	Zhao Yuping; China	Sheilla Wanyoyi; Kenya	Anna Kulinich-Sorokina; Neutral Paralympic Athletes [[|]]
Javelin throw	F34	Zou Lijuan; China	Zuo Caiyun; China	Dayna Crees; Australia
Javelin throw	F46	Noelle Roorda; Netherlands	Shahinakhon Yigitalieva; Uzbekistan	Hollie Arnold; Great Britain
Javelin throw	F54	Elham Salehi; Iran	Alondra Salazar; Mexico	Rebeca Citlaly Cortés; Mexico
Javelin throw	F56	Diāna Krumina; Latvia	Raíssa Rocha Machado; Brazil	Zeinab Moradi Rashnou; Iran
Club throw	F32	Roza Kozakowska; Poland	Maroua Brahmi; Tunisia	Giovanna Boscolo; Brazil
Club throw	F51	Zoia Ovsii; Ukraine	Ekta Bhyan; India	Ekaterina Potapova; Neutral Paralympic Athletes [[|]]

=== Mixed ===
Event	Class	Gold	Silver	Bronze
4 × 100 metres relay	Universal	Netherlands; Zara Temmink; Fleur Jong; Stijn van Bergen; Lito Anker	Indonesia; Ni Made Arianti Putri; Nanda Mei Sholihah; Saptoyogo Purnomo; Jaenal Aripin	Australia; Nathan Jason; Lexie Brown; Akeesha Snowden; Luke Bailey

== See also ==
- World Athletics track and field championships in 2025
  - 2025 World Athletics Championships
  - 2025 World Athletics Indoor Championships
  - 2025 World Athletics Relays
- World Para Sports Championships in 2025
  - 2025 World Para Swimming Championships
  - 2025 World Para Rowing Championships
  - 2025 ICF Paracanoe World Championships
  - 2025 UCI Para-cycling Road World Championships
  - 2025 UCI Para-cycling Track World Championships
  - 2025 World Para Archery Championships
  - 2025 IFSC Paraclimbing World Championships
