= Ali Baziyar Shoorijeh =

Iranian para-athlete (born 1999)

Personal information
- Nationality: Iranian
- Born: 8 November 1999 (age 26)

Sport
- Sport: Para-athletics
- Disability class: F54
- Event: javelin throw
Medal record
Men's para-athletics
Representing Iran
World Championships
Gold medal – first place	2025 New Delhi	Javelin throw F54

Ali Baziyar Shoorijeh (born 8 November 1999) is an Iranian para-athlete specializing in javelin throw.

== Career ==
Baziyar competed at the 2025 World Para Athletics Championships and won a gold medal in the javelin throw F54 event with a throw of 32.24 metres.
