= Tomás Soto =

Colombian para athlete (born 2007)

Personal information
- Full name: Tomás Felipe Soto Mina
- Born: 30 March 2007 (age 19)

Sport
- Country: Colombia
- Sport: Para-athletics
- Disability class: F64
- Event: javelin throw
Medal record
Representing Colombia
Men's para-athletics
World Championships
Silver medal – second place	2025 New Delhi	Javelin throw F64

Tomás Felipe Soto Mina (born 30 March 2007) is a Colombian para-athlete specializing in javelin throw.

== Career ==
In September 2025, he was selected to represent Colombia at the 2025 World Para Athletics Championships, where he was the only youth member of the national roster. He won a silver medal in the javelin throw F64 event.
