= Venezuela at the 2025 World Para Athletics Championships =

- IPC code: VEN
- NPC: Comité Paralimpico Venezolano

in New Delhi, India September 27, 2025 – October 5, 2025
- Competitors: 7

Summer appearances
- 2023; 2024; 2025

Venezuela is participating in the 2025 World Para Athletics Championships, being held in New Delhi, India from 27 September to 5 October 2025. The Venezuelan contingent consists of 7 athletes.

== Track events ==
Legend:

- Note – Ranks given for track events are only within the athlete's heat.
- Q = Qualified for the next round
- q = Qualified for the next round as the fastest loser or, in field events, by position without achieving the qualifying target.
- DSQ = Disqualified
- DNF = Did Not Finish
- WR = World Record
- CR = Championship Record
- PB = Personal Best
- SB = Season Best

=== Men ===
Athlete	Event	Heats		Semi-final		Final	
Athlete	Event	Result	Rank	Result	Rank	Result	Rank
Enderson Santos	400m T11	54.28 ~~SB~~	1Q	53.29 SB	2q	30 Sep; 07:48 PM	

=== Women ===
Athlete	Event	Heats		Semi-final		Final	
Athlete	Event	Result	Rank	Result	Rank	Result	Rank
Linda Patricia Pérez López	100m T11	30 Sep; 05:53 PM					
Yescarly Medina	100m T37	14.18 SB	4q	—		1 Oct; 11:28 AM	
Alejandra Paola Pérez López	400m T12	30 Sep; 06:45 PM					
Leonela Coromoto Vera Colina	400m T20	57.10 SB	1Q	—		56.29 PB	4
