= 2023 World Para Athletics Championships – Men's club throw =

The men's club throw event at the 2023 World Para Athletics Championships were held at Charlety Stadium, Paris, France.

== Medalists ==
Event	Gold	Silver	Bronze
F51	Filip Graovac; Serbia	Mario Santana Ramos Hernandez; Mexico	Aleksandar Radišić; Serbia

== Results ==
=== F51 ===
The event took place on 14 July.

Rank	Athlete	Attempts						Best	Notes
Rank	Athlete	1	2	3	4	5	6	Best	Notes
1st place, gold medalist(s)	Filip Graovac; Serbia	30.88	32.33	32.62	32.45	31.84	32.72	32.72	
2nd place, silver medalist(s)	Mario Santana Ramos Hernandez; Mexico	x	31.22	29.86	29.52	32.21	31.68	32.21	
3rd place, bronze medalist(s)	Aleksandar Radišić; Serbia	31.58	30.44	30.52	30.24	31.88	31.19	31.88	PB
4	Marián Kuřeja; Slovakia	30.49	x	29.32	29.32	29.54	30.74	30.74	
5	Dharambir; India	28.22	27.62	29.07	27.00	25.17	30.40	30.40	
6	Pranav Soorma; India	28.77	x	28.50	28.01	x	25.43	28.77	
7	Michal Enge; Czech Republic	24.58	27.17	28.24	28.30	x	27.27	28.30	
