= Zara Temmink =

Dutch para athlete (born 2004)

Personal information
- Nationality: Dutch
- Born: 24 November 2004 (age 21) Zelhem, Netherlands

Sport
- Sport: Para athletics
- Disability: Retinitis pigmentosa
- Disability class: T13
- Event(s): 100 metres 200 metres
- Club: AV Argo
- Coached by: Fynn van Buuren, Joep Janssen
Medal record
Para-athletics
Representing Netherlands
World Championships
Gold medal – first place	2025 New Delhi	Universal 4 × 100 metres relay

Zara Temmink (born 24 November 2004) is a Dutch T13 para athlete who competes in the 100 metres and 200 metres. She is a member of AV Argo in Doetinchem and represented the Netherlands at international competitions including at the 2024 Summer Paralympics and 2025 World Para Athletics Championships.

== Career ==
Temmink was initially active in artistic gymnastics before switching to para athletics. She attended a Paralympic talent day, where she was scouted into the Dutch talent program.

She trains with AV Argo in Doetinchem under coaches Fynn van Buuren and Joep Janssen. In 2024, she competed in national para athletics events, and qualified for the 2024 Summer Paralympics where she competed in the 100 metres T13 event.

In June 2024, Temmink competed at the FBK Games in Hengelo, the first edition to include para athletics on the main program. In March 2025, she competed at the 2025 European Athletics Indoor Championships in Apeldoorn, where para athletics was included for the first time in the programme. In July, she became national champion and so qualified for the 2025 World Para Athletics Championships. At the 2025 World Championships, she won a gold medal in the universal 4 × 100 metres relay.

== Personal life ==
Temmink was born in Zelhem and grew up in Doetinchem. She has retinitis pigmentosa, a degenerative eye condition that reduces her vision to about 15 percent and progressively worsens over time.
