= Natsuki Toda (athlete) =

Japanese para-athlete (born 2004)

Personal information
- Born: 1 July 2004 (age 21)

Sport
- Sport: Para-athletics
- Disability class: T20
- Event: long-distance running
Medal record
Men's para-athletics
Representing Japan
World Championships
Silver medal – second place	2025 New Delhi	1500 m T20

Natsuki Toda (born 1 July 2004) is a Japanese para-athete specializing in long-distance running.

== Career ==
Toda competed at the 2025 World Para Athletics Championships and won a silver medal in 1500 metres T20 event.
