= Li Yingli =

Chinese Paralympic athlete (born 1997)

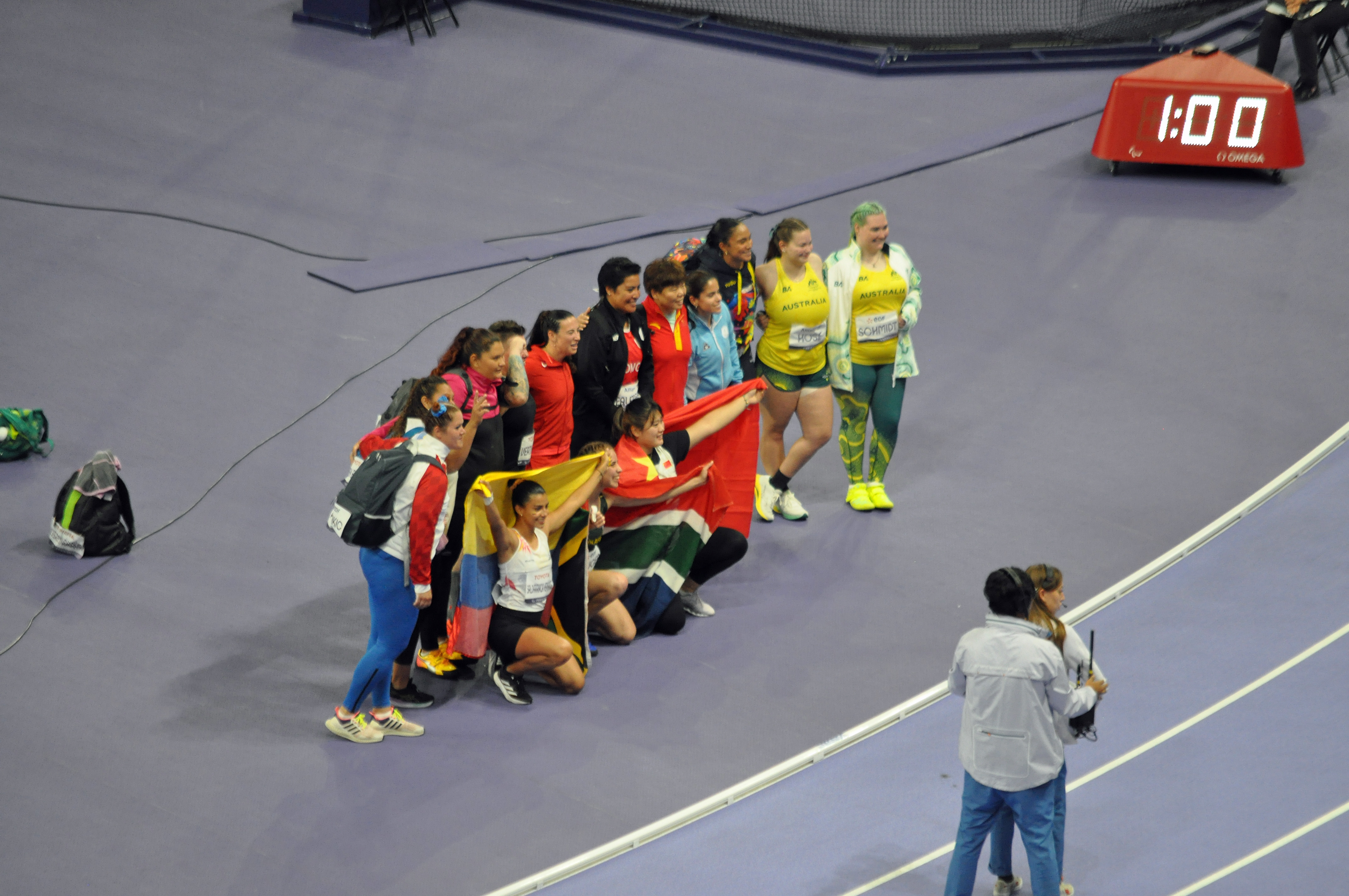
- Xiomara Saldarriaga, Simone Kruger and Li at the 2024 Paralympics

Personal information
- Born: 24 December 1997 (age 28) China

Sport
- Country: China
- Sport: Paralympic athletics
- Disability: Limb deficiency
- Disability class: T37
Medal record
Women's para-athletics
Representing China
Paralympic Games
Gold medal – first place	2016 Rio	4 × 100 m – T35-38
Gold medal – first place	2024 Paris	Shot put F37
Silver medal – second place	2024 Paris	Discus throw F38
Bronze medal – third place	2020 Tokyo	Shot put F37
World Championships
Gold medal – first place	2015 Doha	200m T37
Gold medal – first place	2024 Kobe	Shot put F37
Bronze medal – third place	2015 Doha	100m relay - T35-38
Silver medal – second place	2017 London	Discus throw F38
Bronze medal – third place	2025 New Delhi	Discus throw F38

Li Yingli (born 24 December 1997) is a Chinese Paralympic athlete. She is a Paralympic gold medalist and three-time medalist at the World Para Athletics Championships.

== Career ==
Li represented China at the 2016 Summer Paralympics; in the women's 4 × 100 metres relay T35-T38 event she won the gold medal together with Wen Xiaoyan, Chen Junfei and Jiang Fenfen.
