= Thibault Daurat =

French para athlete (born 2003)

Personal information
- Nationality: French
- Born: 17 April 2003 (age 23)

Sport
- Sport: Para-athletics
- Disability class: T54
- Club: Occitanie Club
- Coached by: Florian Delaunay
Medal record
Men's para-athletics
Representing France
World Championships
| Silver medal – second place | 2025 New Delhi | 5000 m T54 |

Thibault Daurat (born 17 April 2003) is a French T54 wheelchair racer.

== Career ==
Daurat competed at the 2025 World Para Athletics Championships and won a silver medal in the 5000 metres T54 event.
