= Alicia Guerrero =

American para athlete (born 2003)

Personal information
- Nationality: American
- Born: June 11, 2003 (age 23)
- Home town: Wapato, Washington, U.S.

Sport
- Sport: Para-athletics
- Disability class: F64
- Event(s): discus throw shot put
- Coached by: Jasmine Burrell
Medal record
Women's para-athletics
Representing the United States
World Championships
Bronze medal – third place	2025 New Delhi	Discus throw F64
Bronze medal – third place	2025 New Delhi	Shot put F64
Parapan American Games
Bronze medal – third place	2023 Santiago	Discus throw F64

Alicia Guerrero (born June 11, 2003) is an American para athlete specializing in throwing events.

== Early life and education ==
Guerrero grew up doing ballet before transitioning to gymnastics. She then joined a basketball team in the second grade, and also played volleyball, fastpitch softball and soccer.

She attended Wapato High School in Wapato, Washington where she was a Washington state throwing champion and state record holder in discus throw, javelin throw and shot put.

She attended the University of Illinois Urbana-Champaign where she was a member of the wheelchair basketball team, before transferring to San Diego State University in 2024, where she competes for SDSU's Adapted Athletics program in discus and shot put.

== Career ==
Guerrero represented the United States at the 2023 Parapan American Games and won a bronze medal in the discus throw F64 event.

On August 3, 2025, she was selected to represent the United States at the 2025 World Para Athletics Championships. She won a bronze medal in the discus throw F64 event with a throw of 29.45 meters. She also won a bronze medal in the shot put F64 event with a throw of 10.02 meters.

== Personal life ==
Guerrero lost her left leg in a lawn mowing accident in 2005 at two years old. She is a member of the Tolowa Dee-niʼ Nation.
