= Mikhail Rudkovskiy =

Russian footballer

Personal information
- Full name: Mikhail Aleksandrovich Rudkovskiy
- Date of birth: 1 February 1979 (age 47)
- Height: 1.80 m (5 ft 11 in)
- Position: Midfielder

Senior career*
Years	Team	Apps	(Gls)
1996	FC Rostselmash-d Rostov-on-Don	2	(0)
2000	FC Torpedo Taganrog	26	(1)
2001–2004	FC Spartak Tambov	125	(8)
2005	FC Avangard Kursk	11	(0)
2005	FC Lokomotiv Kaluga	17	(1)
2007	FC Taganrog	11	(1)
2009	FC Bataysk-2007	3	(0)
- * Club domestic league appearances and goals

Mikhail Aleksandrovich Rudkovskiy (Russian: Михаил Александрович Рудковский; born 1 February 1979) is a former Russian professional football player.

== Club career ==
He played in the Russian Football National League for FC Avangard Kursk in 2005.
