= Uladzislau Hryb =

Belarusian para-athlete (born 1997)

Personal information
- Nationality: Belarusian
- Born: 19 February 1997 (age 29)

Sport
- Sport: Para athletics
- Disability class: F51
- Event(s): club throw discus throw
Medal record
Men's para athletics
Representing Neutral Paralympic Athletes
World Championships
Bronze medal – third place	2025 New Delhi	Club throw F51

Uladzislau Hryb (born 19 February 1997) is a Belarusian para-athlete specializing in throwing events. He competed at the 2020 and 2024 Summer Paralympics.

== Career ==
Hryb represented Belarus at the 2020 Summer Paralympics and finished in sixth place in the club throw F51 event with a personal best throw of 27.47 metres. He represented Neutral Paralympic Athletes at the 2024 Summer Paralympics and finished in eighth place in the discus throw F52 event with a season best throw of 12.28 metres. He competed at the 2025 World Para Athletics Championships and won a bronze medal in the club throw F51 event with a throw of 28.70 metres.
