= Xiomara Saldarriaga =

Colombian paralympic athlete

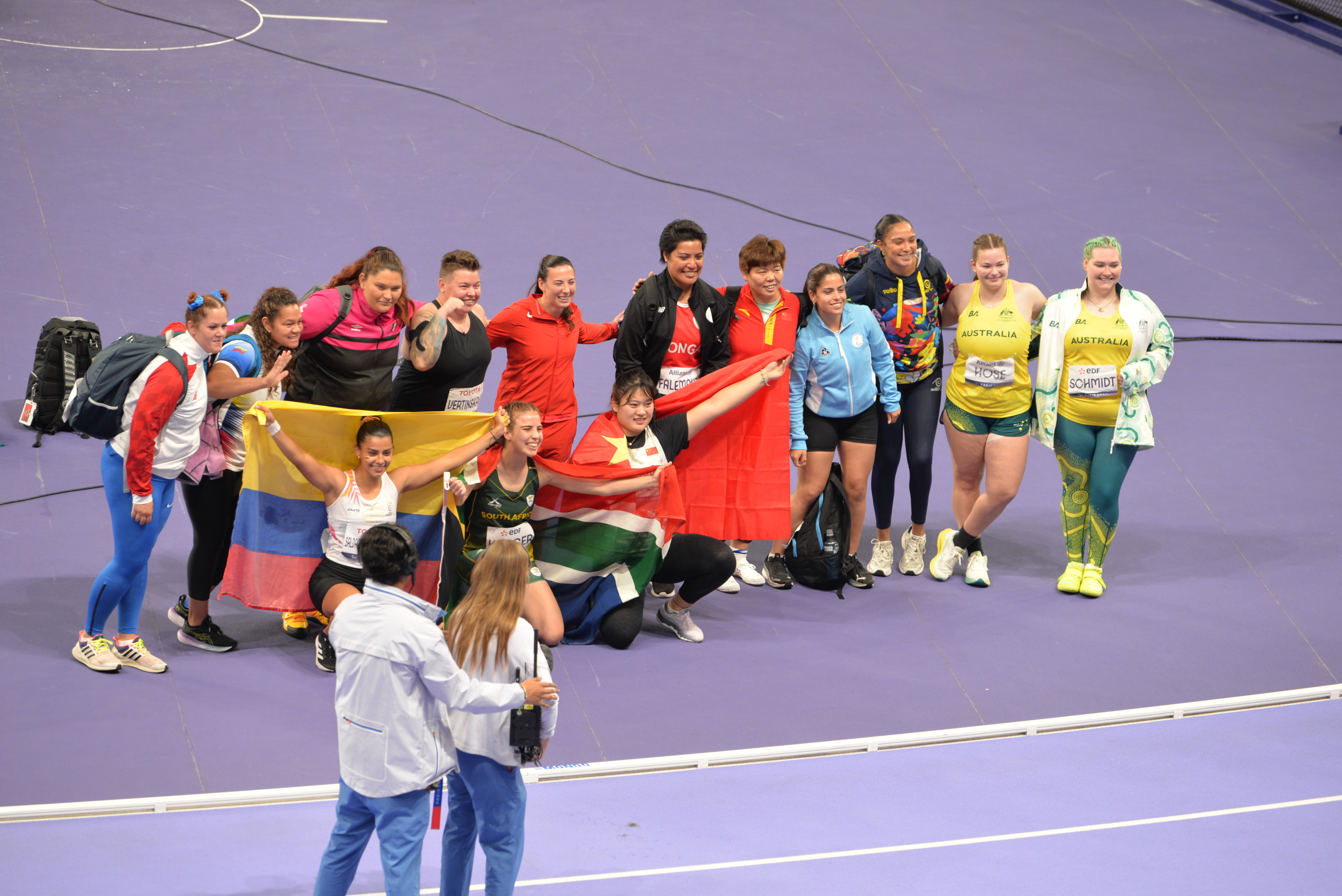
- Xiomara Saldarriaga, Simoné Kruger and Li Yingli at the 2024 Paralympics

Personal information
- Full name: Xiomara Saldarriaga Hernández
- Born: 8 August 2004 (age 21) Villavicencio, Colombia

Sport
- Country: Colombia
- Sport: Para-athletics
Medal record
Women's para-athletics
Representing Colombia
Paralympic Games
Bronze medal – third place	2024 Paris	Discus throw F38

Xiomara Saldarriaga Hernández (Note: In this Spanish name, the first or paternal surname is Saldarriaga and the second or maternal family name is Hernández.) (born 8 August 2004) is a Colombian paralympic athlete. She competed at the 2024 Summer Paralympics, winning the bronze medal in the women's discus throw F38 event.
