= Erfan Bondori Deraznoei =

Iranian para-athlete (born 1999)

Erfan Bondori
Personal information
- Full name: Erfan Bondori Deraznoei
- Nationality: Iranian
- Born: 1 July 1999 (age 27)

Sport
- Sport: Para-athletics
- Disability class: F54
- Event: javelin throw
Medal record
Men's para-athletics
Representing Iran
World Championships
Bronze medal – third place	2025 New Delhi	Javelin throw F54
Asian Para Games
Gold medal – first place	2022 Hangzhou	Javelin throw F54
Gold medal – first place	2026 Aichi–Nagoya	Javelin throw F54

Erfan Bondori Deraznoei (born 1 July 1999) is an Iranian para-athlete specializing in javelin throw. He represented Iran at the 2024 Summer Paralympics.

== Career ==
Deraznoei represented Iran at the 2024 Summer Paralympics and finished in fifth place in the javelin throw F54 event with a throw of 29.12 metres. He competed at the 2025 World Para Athletics Championships and won a bronze medal in the javelin throw F54 event.

In October 2026, he competed at the 2026 Asian Para Games and won a gold medal in the javelin throw F53/54 event with an Asian Para Games record throw of 30.24 metres.
