= Stijn van Bergen =

Dutch para-athlete (born 2003)

Personal information
- Nationality: Dutch
- Born: 24 October 2003 (age 22)

Sport
- Country: Netherlands
- Sport: Paralympic athletics
- Disability class: T37
- Event: Sprint
Medal record
Men's para athletics
Representing Netherlands
World Championships
Gold medal – first place	2025 New Delhi	Universal 4 × 100 metres relay
- Updated on 5 October 2025

Stijn van Bergen (born 24 October 2003) is a Dutch para-athlete who competes in T37 sprint events.

== Career ==
At the 2025 World Championships, van Bergen won a gold medal in the universal 4 × 100 metres relay.
