= Jean Oliveira da Silva =

Brazilian para athlete (born 1998)

Personal information
- Nationality: Brazilian
- Born: 20 May 1998 (age 28)

Sport
- Country: Brazil
- Sport: Para athletics
- Disability class: T13
- Event(s): 1500 metres 5000 metres
Medal record
Men's para-athletics
Representing Brazil
World Championships
Bronze medal – third place	2025 New Delhi	5000 m T13

Jean Oliveira da Silva (born 20 May 1998) is a Brazilian para-athlete who specializes in long-distance running.

== Career ==
Oliveira da Silva competed at the 2025 World Para Athletics Championships and won a bronze medal in the 5000 metres T13 event with a time of 15:22.68. He also competed in the 1500 metres T13 and finished in fifth place with a time of 4:03.33.
