= Pradeep Puwakpitikande =

Sri Lankan para-athlete (born 1998)

Personal information
- Born: 2 May 1998 (age 28) Sri Lanka

Sport
- Sport: Para-athletics
- Disability class: T46
- Event: 1500 metres
Medal record
Para-athletics
Representing Sri Lanka
World Championships
Bronze medal – third place	2025 New Delhi	1500 m T46

Pradeep Puwakpitikande (born 2 May 1998) is a Sri Lankan para-athlete who competes in the 1500m in the T46 classification. He competed at the 2024 Summer Paralympics. He has won one bronze medal at the World Para Athletics Championships.

== Athletics career ==
Puwakpitikande made his Paralympic debut representing Sri Lanka at the 2024 Summer Paralympics. He competed in the T46 1500m event, placing 9th with a time of 4:01.84.

At the 2025 World Para Athletics Championships, Puwakpitikande won a bronze medal in the 1500 m T46 event.
