= Aleksei Churkin =

Russian Paralympic athlete

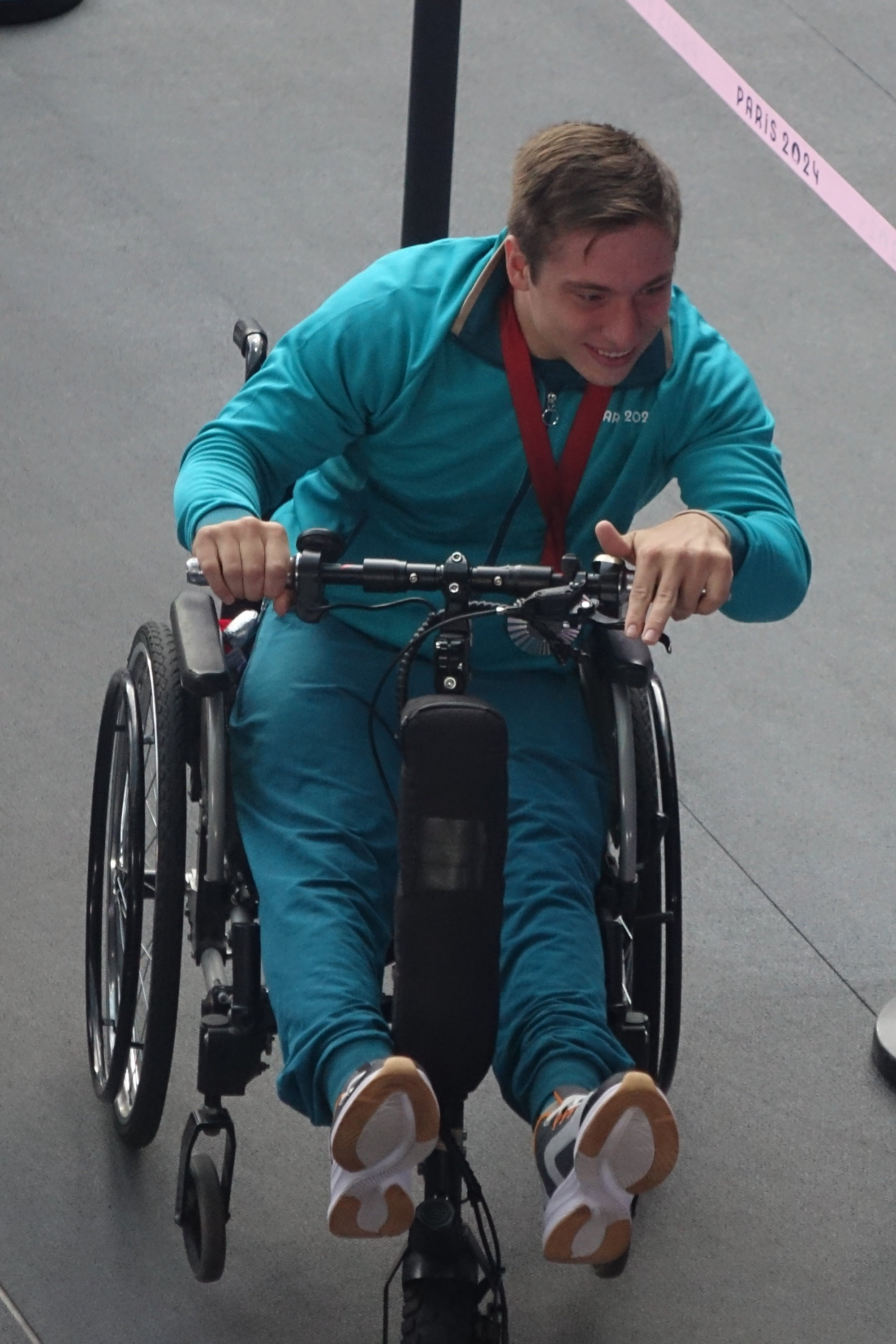
- Churkin at the 2024 Summer Paralympics

Personal information
- Native name: Алексей Чуркин
- Nationality: Russian
- Born: 2 July 1998 (age 28)

Sport
- Sport: Paralympic athletics
- Disability class: F32
- Events: shot put club throw
- Club: Paralympic Adaptive Sports School
- Coached by: Denis Babak; Lyudmila Babak
Medal record
Men's para-athletics
Representing Neutral Paralympic Athletes
Gold medal – first place	2024 Paris	Club throw F32
Silver medal – second place	2024 Paris	Shot put F32
World Championships
Gold medal – first place	2024 Kobe	Shot put F32
Bronze medal – third place	2024 Kobe	Club throw F32
Representing RPC
Paralympic Games
Silver medal – second place	2020 Tokyo	Shot put F32
Representing Russia
European Championships
Gold medal – first place	2021 Bydgoszcz	Shot put F32

Aleksei Churkin (Russian: Алексей Чуркин, born 2 July 1998) is a Russian para-athlete who specializes in shot put and club throw.

== Career ==
Churkin represented Russian Paralympic Committee athletes at the 2020 Summer Paralympics in the shot put F32 event and won a silver medal.
