= 2025 World Para Athletics Championships – Women's 5000 metres =

The women's 5000 metres events at the 2025 World Para Athletics Championships were held at the Jawaharlal Nehru Stadium, Delhi in New Delhi.

== Medalists ==
Event	Gold	Silver	Bronze
T54	Catherine Debrunner; Switzerland	Tian Yajuan; China	Patricia Eachus; Switzerland

== T54 ==
Final

The final took place on 28 September.

Rank	Name	Nationality	Class	Time	Notes
1st place, gold medalist(s)	Catherine Debrunner	Switzerland	T53	12:18.29	
2nd place, silver medalist(s)	Tian Yajuan	China	T54	12:20.21	SB
3rd place, bronze medalist(s)	Patricia Eachus	Switzerland	T54	12:22.41	
4	Noemi Alphonse	Mauritius	T54	12:23.03	SB
