= Denis Churkin (footballer, born 2001) =

Russian footballer

Personal information
- Full name: Denis Sergeyevich Churkin
- Date of birth: 8 March 2001 (age 25)
- Height: 1.78 m (5 ft 10 in)
- Position: Midfielder

Senior career*
Years	Team	Apps	(Gls)
2020	FC Yenisey Krasnoyarsk	1	(0)
2021–2023	FC Yenisey-2 Krasnoyarsk	23	(0)
- * Club domestic league appearances and goals as of 10 June 2023

Denis Sergeyevich Churkin (Russian: Денис Сергеевич Чуркин; born 8 March 2001) is a Russian football player.

== Club career ==
He made his debut in the Russian Football National League for FC Yenisey Krasnoyarsk on 27 September 2020 in a game against FC Krasnodar-2.
