= Akeesha Snowden =

Australian para athlete (born 2005)

Personal information
- Nationality: Australian
- Born: 26 May 2005 (age 21)

Sport
- Sport: Para-athletics
- Disability: Cerebral palsy
- Disability class: T37
- Event(s): 100 metres, 400 metres
- Club: Hills District Athletics Club
- Coached by: Lynn Larsen
Medal record
Women's para-athletics
Representing Australia
World Championships
Bronze medal – third place	2025 New Delhi	Universal 4 × 100 m relay

Akeesha Snowden (born 26 May 2005) is an Australian para athlete who competes in T37 sprint events.

== Career ==
Snowden made her senior national team debut for Australia at the 2025 World Para Athletics Championships and won a bronze medal in the universal 4 × 100 metres relay. She also finished in fourth place in both the 100 metres T37, and 400 metres T37 events.

== Personal life ==
Snowden was diagnosed with cerebral palsy at two-years old.
