= Lexie Brown (athlete) =

Australian para-athlete (born 2011)

Personal information
- Born: 28 May 2011 (age 15) Nambucca Heads, New South Wales, Australia

Sport
- Sport: Para-athletics
- Disability class: F47
- Events: 100 metres 200 metres
Medal record
Para-athletics
Representing Australia
World Championships
Bronze medal – third place	2025 New Delhi	Universal 4 × 100 m relay

Lexie Brown (born 28 May 2011) is an Australian track and field athlete competing in F47 sprinting events. At the World Para Athletics Championships, she has won a bronze medal.

== Early life and education ==
Lexie Brown was born in Nambucca Heads, New South Wales to a family of Indigenous Australian descent (Gumbaynggirr and Gamilaraay). Born with a lower left arm amputation, she was encouraged by her school sports teacher to take up multi-class sport. She is a student at Nambucca Heads High School.

== Career ==
Brown smashed state records in the 100m, 200m, and long jump, while also serving as Team Captain of NSW in 2023. She had also broke multiple national age records, including a 200m time of 27.53.

In July 2025, Brown was named to the Australian team to compete at the 2025 World Para Athletics Championships, where she was the youngest competitor in the delegation and made her international debut. In the 100 metres and 200 metres events respectively, she posted a time of 13.12 and 26.87, eliminating her in the first round in these events but nonetheless set her personal best. She was then part of the Australian team that won the bronze medal in the universal 4 × 100 metres relay event.
