= Tian Yuxin =

Chinese para athlete (born 1999)

Personal information
- Nationality: Chinese
- Born: 21 October 1999 (age 26)

Sport
- Sport: Para-athletics
- Disability class: F57
- Event(s): discus throw shot put
Medal record
Women's para-athletics
Representing China
World Championships
Silver medal – second place	2025 New Delhi	Discus throw F57
Bronze medal – third place	2025 New Delhi	Shot put F57
Asian Para Games
Silver medal – second place	2018 Jakarta	Shot put F56/57
Silver medal – second place	2022 Hangzhou	Shot put F57
Bronze medal – third place	2018 Jakarta	Discus throw F56/57

Tian Yuxin (born 21 October 1999) is a Chinese para athlete who specializes in throwing events. She represented China at the 2024 Summer Paralympics.

== Career ==
Tian competed at the 2022 Asian Para Games and won a silver medal in the Shot put F57 event. She represented China at the 2024 Summer Paralympics and finished in fifth place in the discus throw F57 event. She competed at the 2025 World Para Athletics Championships and won a silver medal in the discus throw F57 event.
