= Kirra Wright =

Australian Paralympic athlete (born 2008)

Personal information
- Born: 20 April 2008 (age 18) Wallan, Victoria, Australia

Sport
- Sport: Para-athletics
- Disability: Cerebral palsy
- Disability class: F36
- Event: Shot put
Medal record
Para-athletics
Representing Australia
World Championships
Silver medal – second place	2025 New Delhi	Shot put F36

Kirra Wright (born 20 April 2008) is an Australian track and field athlete competing in shot put and sprinting events. At the World Para Athletics Championships, she has won a silver medal.

== Early life and education ==
Kirra Wright was born in Wallan, Victoria to a family of Indigenous Australian descent (Gunditjmara and Dharug). She has cerebral palsy, which has affected her coordination, strength and walking. She is a student of Assumption College.

== Career ==
Wright was named to the team to compete at the 2025 World Para Athletics Championships, where she made her international debut for Australia. During the World Championships, she won a silver medal in the shot put F36 event.
