= Lan Hanyu =

Chinese paralympic athlete

Personal information
- Native name: 兰涵钰
- Born: 7 July 2007 (age 18)

Sport
- Country: China
- Sport: Para-athletics
Medal record
Women's para-athletics
Representing China
Paralympic Games
Bronze medal – third place	2024 Paris	100 m T34
World Championships
Silver medal – second place	2024 Kobe	100 m T34
Silver medal – second place	2024 Kobe	800 m T34
Bronze medal – third place	2025 New Delhi	100 m T34
Bronze medal – third place	2025 New Delhi	800 m T34
Asian Para Games
Gold medal – first place	2022 Hangzhou	100 m T34
Gold medal – first place	2022 Hangzhou	800 m T34

Lan Hanyu ( Chinese: 兰涵钰) (born 7 July 2007) is a Chinese paralympic athlete. She competed at the 2024 Summer Paralympics, winning the bronze medal in the women's 100 m T34 event.
