= 2025 World Para Athletics Championships – Men's javelin throw =

The men's javelin throw events at the 2025 World Para Athletics Championships were held at the Jawaharlal Nehru Stadium, Delhi in New Delhi.

== Medalists ==
Event	Gold	Silver	Bronze
F13	Daniel Pembroke; Great Britain	Ulicer Aguilera Cruz; Cuba	Héctor Cabrera; Spain
F34	Saeid Afrooz; Iran	Diego Meneses; Colombia	Mauricio Valencia; Colombia
F38	José Lemos; Colombia	Luis Fernando Lucumí Villegas; Colombia	Vladyslav Bilyi; Ukraine
F41	Sadegh Beit Sayah; Iran	Navdeep Singh; India	Sun Pengxiang; China
F44	Sandip Sanjay Sargar; India	Sandeep Chaudhary; India	Edenilson Roberto; Brazil
F46	Rinku Hooda; India	Sundar Singh Gurjar; India	Guillermo Varona; Cuba
F54	Ali Baziyarshoorijeh; Iran	Ivan Revenko; Neutral Paralympic Athletes	Erfan Bondori Deraznoei; Iran
F57	Mohammad Khalvandi; Turkey	Yorkinbek Odilov; Uzbekistan	Amanolah Papi; Iran
F64	Sumit Antil; India	Tomás Soto; Colombia	Rufat Khabibullin; Kazakhstan

== F13 ==
Final

The event took place on 4 October.

Rank	Name	Nationality	Сlass	#1	#2	#3	#4	#5	#6	Result	Notes
1st place, gold medalist(s)	Dan Pembroke	Great Britain	F13	58.86	67.34	62.28	64.83	64.84	68.51	68.51	SB
2nd place, silver medalist(s)	Ulicer Aguilera Cruz	Cuba	F13	59.26	63.37	61.18	58.94	56.50	53.85	63.37	AM
3rd place, bronze medalist(s)	Héctor Cabrera	Spain	F12	60.27	59.71	52.91	59.38	55.15	56.45	60.27	SB
4	Osvaldas Kucavicius	Lithuania	F12	50.71	57.87	51.09	51.80	54.28	55.76	57.87	PB
5	Manjeet	India	F13	50.39	54.04	57.80	56.45	x	53.59	57.80	PB
6	Octavian Vasile Tucaliuc	Romania	F12	51.47	49.16	53.56	52.18	53.25	47.41	53.56	PB
7	Nemanja Dimitrijević	Serbia	F13	51.53	46.48	43.79	47.23	47.74	49.06	51.53	

== F34 ==
Final

The event took place on 2 October.

Rank	Name	Nationality	Сlass	#1	#2	#3	#4	#5	#6	Result	Notes
1st place, gold medalist(s)	Saeid Afrooz	Iran	F34	37.75	39.00	40.00	39.05	41.52	39.20	41.52	WR
2nd place, silver medalist(s)	Diego Meneses	Colombia	F34	37.48	37.64	37.37	36.66	37.36	39.19	39.19	AM
3rd place, bronze medalist(s)	Mauricio Valencia	Colombia	F34	36.01	35.98	37.28	37.94	x	x	37.94	
4	Zhang Zhongqiang	China	F34	33.66	x	34.27	x	33.81	x	34.27	SB
5	Lin Wenbang	China	F34	31.45	32.77	33.40	31.70	32.50	32.76	33.40	SB
6	Muhsin Kaedi	Turkey	F34	27.17	28.74	29.84	28.86	x	30.74	30.74	SB
7	Tomáš Horáček	Czech Republic	F34	29.53	25.96	x	26.28	27.39	x	29.53	
8	Karolis Virkutis	Lithuania	F34	23.61	25.21	x	x	x	24.70	25.21	PB
9	Pasi Heikkilä	Finland	F34	x	x	25.03	23.86	24.98	24.32	25.03	

== F38 ==
Final

The event took place on 1 October.

Rank	Name	Nationality	Сlass	#1	#2	#3	#4	#5	#6	Result	Notes
1st place, gold medalist(s)	José Lemos	Colombia	F38	53.99	55.70	56.09	57.31	58.58	60.94	60.94	CR
2nd place, silver medalist(s)	Luis Fernando Lucumí Villegas	Colombia	F38	45.96	51.88	51.86	53.12	53.19	53.51	53.51	SB
3rd place, bronze medalist(s)	Vladyslav Bilyi	Ukraine	F38	48.41	52.04	53.15	x	49.41	53.50	53.50	SB
4	Levin Moreno	Colombia	F38	42.92	42.59	49.14	48.18	46.40	48.76	49.14	PB
5	An Dongquan	China	F38	46.05	44.53	45.21	43.67	44.41	44.41	46.05	SB
6	Corey Anderson	Australia	F38	40.04	44.68	42.75	44.79	44.94	45.39	45.39	
7	Petr Vrátil	Czech Republic	F38	37.97	40.72	x	x	x	x	40.72	SB

== F41 ==
Final

The event took place on 5 October.

Rank	Name	Nationality	Сlass	#1	#2	#3	#4	#5	#6	Result	Notes
1st place, gold medalist(s)	Sadegh Beit Sayah	Iran	F41	45.50	x	45.76	46.99	48.86	47.77	48.86	PB
2nd place, silver medalist(s)	Navdeep Singh	India	F41	41.38	x	45.46	44.87	x	x	45.46	SB
3rd place, bronze medalist(s)	Sun Pengxiang	China	F41	43.42	43.60	x	41.23	43.46	41.19	43.60	SB
4	Ever Rene Castro Martinez	Cuba	F41	38.08	x	38.30	37.28	39.65	35.66	39.65	AM
5	Boburjon Isomiddinov	Uzbekistan	F41	36.91	38.90	37.13	x	37.62	x	38.90	PB
6	Wildan Nukhailawi	Iraq	F41	37.07	36.25	38.85	36.75	38.23	x	38.85	SB
7	Fan Chengcheng	China	F41	38.32	37.07	38.64	37.73	38.68	37.09	38.68	SB
8	Omer Faruk Ilkin	Turkey	F41	37.16	35.26	36.35	36.00	36.33	35.09	37.16	SB
9	Gurkan Uncuoglu	Turkey	F41	34.89	35.23	35.81				35.81	PB
10	Aiaal Sivtsev	Neutral Paralympic Athletes	F41	33.89	35.10	34.57				35.10	PB

== F44 ==
Final

The event took place on 30 September.

Rank	Name	Nationality	Сlass	#1	#2	#3	#4	#5	#6	Result	Notes
1st place, gold medalist(s)	Sandip Sanjay Sargar	India	F44	61.51	62.11	62.68	61.18	62.82	60.95	62.82	=PB
2nd place, silver medalist(s)	Sandeep Chaudhary	India	F44	62.33	x	60.49	62.06	62.67	59.69	62.67	SB
3rd place, bronze medalist(s)	Edenilson Roberto	Brazil	F42	x	58.25	62.31	x	58.33	62.36	62.36	WR
4	Pushpendra Singh	India	F43	61.10	60.65	59.95	55.38	59.12	61.94	61.94	SB
5	Zakariae Ez Zouhri	Morocco	F44	55.48	55.24	61.31	59.84	60.55	54.60	61.31	SB
6	Michal Burian	Australia	F44	53.03	57.88	57.06	59.58	58.99	58.74	59.58	
7	Mahendra Gurjar	India	F42	54.19	54.84	56.42	57.84	x	54.84	57.84	
8	Roman Novak	Ukraine	F44	57.58	x	x	56.15	56.47	56.97	57.58	SB
9	Jonas Spudis	Lithuania	F44	46.65	47.82	49.18				49.18	

== F46 ==
Final

The event took place on 29 September.

Rank	Name	Nationality	Сlass	#1	#2	#3	#4	#5	#6	Result	Notes
1st place, gold medalist(s)	Rinku Hooda	India	F46	63.81	61.98	62.73	66.37	61.75	x	66.37	CR
2nd place, silver medalist(s)	Sundar Singh Gurjar	India	F46	x	61.02	64.11	x	64.76	62.77	64.76	SB
3rd place, bronze medalist(s)	Guillermo Varona	Cuba	F46	x	60.87	63.34	60.28	62.30	62.29	63.34	SB
4	Ajeet Singh Yadav	India	F46	55.83	61.77	58.47	61.77	x	60.42	61.77	SB
5	Eliezer Gabriel	Mexico	F46	57.55	61.20	60.38	60.36	58.99	60.12	61.20	SB
6	Shunya Takahashi	Japan	F46	58.29	55.11	x	54.42	56.47	60.15	60.15	SB
7	Akihiro Yamazaki	Japan	F46	59.83	54.85	50.00	55.73	48.64	55.89	59.83	SB
8	Muzrobjon Ganiev	Uzbekistan	F46	54.15	52.75	49.51	49.68	55.05	53.04	55.05	PB
9	Nathan Kemboi	Kenya	F46	51.50	x	47.33				51.50	SB
10	Robert Kiprotich	Kenya	F46	48.79	42.34	43.17				48.79	PB
11	Elyorbek Elmatov	Uzbekistan	F46	41.15	47.49	46.01				47.49	PB

== F54 ==
Final

The event took place on 4 October.

Rank	Name	Nationality	Сlass	#1	#2	#3	#4	#5	#6	Result	Notes
1st place, gold medalist(s)	Ali Baziyarshoorijeh	Iran	F54	30.18	32.18	31.91	32.24	31.82	x	32.24	CR
2nd place, silver medalist(s)	Ivan Revenko	Neutral Paralympic Athletes	F54	30.09	31.68	x	30.81	x	31.40	31.68	ER
3rd place, bronze medalist(s)	Erfan Bondori Deraznoei	Iran	F54	29.37	27.74	31.23	30.63	31.15	30.90	31.23	PB
4	Justin Phongsavanh	United States	F54	31.05	x	30.60	30.63	30.09	29.87	31.05	SB
5	Édgar Ulises Fuentes Yáñez	Mexico	F54	x	30.45	30.63	x	x	x	30.63	SB
6	Ladislav Čuchran	Slovakia	F54	24.59	27.15	26.01	27.51	26.29	27.17	27.51	SB
7	Pradeep Kumar	India	F54	24.93	24.96	26.11	x	25.61	25.52	26.11	PB

== F57 ==
Final

The event took place on 28 September.

Rank	Name	Nationality	Сlass	#1	#2	#3	#4	#5	#6	Result	Notes
1st place, gold medalist(s)	Mohammad Khalvandi	Turkey	F57	52.18	48.41	52.98	53.30	52.70	52.16	53.30	PB
2nd place, silver medalist(s)	Yorkinbek Odilov	Uzbekistan	F57	47.31	51.83	50.60	52.06	50.42	49.90	52.06	PB
3rd place, bronze medalist(s)	Amanolah Papi	Iran	F57	48.05	50.14	50.45	49.15	50.75	51.55	51.55	SB
4	Cícero Nobre	Brazil	F57	44.74	47.90	47.28	48.63	46.42	49.45	49.45	
5	Hamid Haydari	Turkey	F57	44.06	47.06	49.26	x	45.71	46.11	49.26	SB
6	Fauzi Purwolaksono	Indonesia	F57	43.98	43.83	44.45	45.63	42.20	42.54	45.63	SB
7	Edgar Ismael Barajas	Mexico	F57	41.99	42.35	42.87	42.14	41.60	41.48	42.87	
8	Parveen Kumar	India	F57	41.42	38.05	38.32	41.28	40.88	41.92	41.92	SB
9	Vitolio Kavakava	France	F57	39.72	38.55	39.89	41.88	41.31	41.26	41.88	
10	Hem Chandra	India	F57	36.51	41.17	37.94	39.67	40.00	38.03	41.17	PB
	James Onyinka Mangerere	Kenya	F57	r						NM	

== F64 ==
Final

The event took place on 30 September.

Rank	Name	Nationality	Сlass	#1	#2	#3	#4	#5	#6	Result	Notes
1st place, gold medalist(s)	Sumit Antil	India	F64	65.59	x	65.36	68.40	71.37	x	71.37	CR
2nd place, silver medalist(s)	Tomás Soto	Colombia	F64	40.62	44.48	43.99	46.95	48.38	46.46	48.38	PB
3rd place, bronze medalist(s)	Rufat Khabibullin	Kazakhstan	F64	36.05	40.55	x	46.62	47.14	x	47.14	PB
4	Derek Loccident	United States	F64	43.91	x	x	43.62	x	40.11	43.91	SB
5	Pardeep Kumar	India	F64	38.89	42.72	42.47	42.05	41.95	41.92	42.72	
6	Sakchai Yimbanchang	Thailand	F64	41.16	38.95	42.48	40.95	40.39	38.41	42.48	SB
7	Konstantinos Tourkochoritis	Greece	F62	26.10	28.76	x	28.53	x	35.08	35.08	WR
