= Denis Churkin (footballer, born 1979) =

Russian footballer

Personal information
- Full name: Denis Gennadyevich Churkin
- Date of birth: 30 July 1979 (age 47)
- Height: 1.85 m (6 ft 1 in)
- Position: Forward

Senior career*
Years	Team	Apps	(Gls)
2002–2005	FC Spartak Chelyabinsk	134	(39)
2006	FC Zvezda Irkutsk	35	(17)
2007–2008	FC Gazovik Orenburg	55	(8)
2009	FC Sakhalin Yuzhno-Sakhalinsk	8	(0)
- * Club domestic league appearances and goals

Denis Gennadyevich Churkin (Russian: Денис Геннадьевич Чуркин, born 30 July 1979) is a former Russian professional football player.

== Club career ==
He played in the Russian Football National League for FC Spartak Chelyabinsk in 2005.
