= 2025 World Para Athletics Championships – Men's club throw =

The men's club throw events at the 2025 World Para Athletics Championships were held at the Jawaharlal Nehru Stadium, Delhi in New Delhi.

== Medalists ==
Event	Gold	Silver	Bronze
F32	Walid Ferhah; Algeria	Ahmed Mehideb; Algeria	Frantisek Serbus; Czech Republic
F51	Aleksandar Radišić; Serbia	Dharambir Nain; India	Uladzislau Hryb; Neutral Paralympic Athletes

== F32 ==
Final

The event took place on 28 September.

Rank	Name	Nationality	#1	#2	#3	#4	#5	#6	Result	Notes
1st place, gold medalist(s)	Walid Ferhah	Algeria	37.21	37.10	39.14	39.53	38.70	38.96	39.53	SB
2nd place, silver medalist(s)	Ahmed Mehideb	Algeria	x	x	x	35.68	35.77	x	35.77	
3rd place, bronze medalist(s)	Frantisek Serbus	Czech Republic	33.20	34.29	x	x	x	34.46	34.46	
4	Abdelhak Missouni	Algeria	30.98	32.96	32.13	30.96	x	x	32.96	
5	Athanasios Konstantinidis	Greece	x	x	x	32.42	30.97	x	32.42	
6	Abdulazizkhon Abdukhakimov	Uzbekistan	32.27	30.97	31.13	x	31.14	28.92	32.27	SB
7	Mohammed Al Mashaykhi	Oman	26.75	28.82	26.97	25.53	26.54	26.62	28.82	
8	Olavio Correia	Portugal	21.35	x	12.76	21.63	22.59	28.15	28.15	
9	Genadij Zametaskin	Lithuania	24.01	24.51	x	23.76	24.02	23.70	24.51	
10	Saad Saad	Bahrain	x	20.93	20.74	22.54	22.56	23.12	23.12	

Qualification

The event took place on 27 September. The 6 first in ranking following to the Final. The 4 best performers (q) advance to the Final.

Rank	Name	Nationality	#1	#2	#3	Result	Notes
1	Abdulazizkhon Abdukhakimov	Uzbekistan	25.47	x	29.34	29.34	q, SB
2	Genadij Zametaskin	Lithuania	20.90	23.72	22.40	23.72	q
3	Saad Saad	Bahrain	x	x	20.48	20.48	q
4	Olavio Correia	Portugal	x	x	13.21	13.21	q
	Dimitrios Zisidis	Greece	x	x	x	NM	

== F51 ==
Final

The event took place on 2 October.

Rank	Name	Nationality	#1	#2	#3	#4	#5	#6	Result	Notes
1st place, gold medalist(s)	Aleksandar Radišić	Serbia	30.36	x	28.85	x	28.39	x	30.36	
2nd place, silver medalist(s)	Dharambir Nain	India	x	29.34	28.19	x	28.58	29.71	29.71	
3rd place, bronze medalist(s)	Uladzislau Hryb	Neutral Paralympic Athletes	28.70	26.30	28.29	27.77	x	28.11	28.70	
4	Mario Santana Ramos	Mexico	28.50	28.10	28.12	26.28	27.78	27.96	28.50	
5	Pranav Soorma	India	27.88	x	26.05	x	28.19	x	28.19	
6	Marián Kuřeja	Slovakia	26.72	20.33	21.80	x	26.70	27.28	27.28	
7	Mirnes Omerhodžic	Croatia	23.77	22.48	23.63	26.00	27.23	x	27.23	
8	Michal Enge	Czech Republic	25.35	x	25.80	26.33	23.41	25.57	26.33	
9	Radovan Halas	Croatia	22.82	24.92	x	24.72	x	25.48	25.48	
