= 2025 World Para Athletics Championships – Women's discus throw =

The women's discus throw events at the 2025 World Para Athletics Championships were held at the Jawaharlal Nehru Stadium, Delhi in New Delhi.

== Medalists ==
Event	Gold	Silver	Bronze
F11	Xue Enhui; China	Assunta Legnante; Italy	Oksana Dobrovolskaja; Lithuania
F38	Simoné Kruger; South Africa	Mi Na; China	Li Yingli; China
F41	Raoua Tlili; Tunisia	Estefany López; Ecuador	Navruza Akhmatova; Uzbekistan
F44	Osiris Aneth Machado; Mexico	Samantha Heyison; United States	Yao Juan; China
F55	Diāna Krumina; Latvia	Érica Castaño; Colombia	Maria Guadalupe Navarro Hernandez; Mexico
F57	Nassima Saifi; Algeria	Tian Yuxin; China	Floralia Estrada; Mexico
F64	Faustyna Kotłowska; Poland	Jessica Heims; United States	Alicia Guerrero; United States

== F11 ==
Final

The event took place on 1 October.

Rank	Name	Nationality	Сlass	#1	#2	#3	#4	#5	#6	Result	Notes
1st place, gold medalist(s)	Xue Enhui	China	F11	38.69	39.22	39.51	39.23	39.34	38.88	39.51	SB
2nd place, silver medalist(s)	Assunta Legnante	Italy	F11	x	x	35.36	37.90	x	34.98	37.90	SB
3rd place, bronze medalist(s)	Oksana Dobrovolskaja	Lithuania	F11	37.24	x	x	34.97	36.54	35.52	37.24	PB
4	Izabela Campos	Brazil	F11	32.39	32.61	x	x	30.67	34.60	34.60	
5	Elena Shakh	Neutral Paralympic Athletes	F11	34.57	x	30.80	x	x	x	34.57	SB
6	Zeng Ruying	Austria	F11	31.53	x	32.24	31.52	32.15	30.97	32.24	PB
7	Shahrizoda Temirova	Uzbekistan	F11	26.10	x	24.64	x	20.86	25.23	26.10	PB
8	Rosalie Torrefiel	Philippines	F11	x	17.33	17.17	17.74	x	x	17.74	

== F38 ==
Final

The event took place on 5 October.

Rank	Name	Nationality	Сlass	#1	#2	#3	#4	#5	#6	Result	Notes
1st place, gold medalist(s)	Simoné Kruger	South Africa	F38	x	32.23	34.93	37.39	36.31	35.89	37.39	SB
2nd place, silver medalist(s)	Mi Na	China	F37	36.53	x	35.06	36.27	34.08	34.44	36.53	SB
3rd place, bronze medalist(s)	Li Yingli	China	F38	35.45	x	x	36.10	x	8.40	36.10	SB
4	Rosa Carolina Castro Castro	Mexico	F38	32.25	33.17	32.47	30.17	x	32.47	33.17	SB
5	Renee Foessel	Canada	F38	30.76	30.32	x	30.29	x	30.54	30.76	
6	Ivana Purkic	Croatia	F38	x	27.04	26.47	26.41	28.42	x	28.42	
7	Ella Hose	Australia	F37	x	26.63	25.70	25.89	28.09	27.28	28.09	SB

== F41 ==
Final

The event took place on 3 October.

Rank	Name	Nationality	Сlass	#1	#2	#3	#4	#5	#6	Result	Notes
1st place, gold medalist(s)	Raoua Tlili	Tunisia	F41	32.92	x	x	33.52	33.81	x	33.81	
2nd place, silver medalist(s)	Estefany López	Ecuador	F41	28.42	x	x	29.81	26.02	27.96	29.81	SB
3rd place, bronze medalist(s)	Navruza Akhmatova	Uzbekistan	F41	x	25.14	28.83	26.37	26.71	21.73	28.83	AS
4	Hayat El Garaa	Morocco	F41	28.50	28.64	28.47	27.66	x	28.48	28.64	
5	Kubaro Khakimova	Uzbekistan	F41	25.82	27.10	x	x	27.85	x	27.85	PB
6	Charlotte Bolton	Canada	F41	26.71	26.57	27.25	27.47	x	x	27.47	
7	Li Wei	China	F41	x	24.39	x	x	26.59	x	26.59	
8	Pauleth Mejía	Mexico	F40	22.95	x	20.71	22.18	24.26	22.96	24.26	AM
9	Renata Śliwińska	Poland	F40	22.50	22.55	x				22.55	
10	Saruultugs Dagvadorj	Mongolia	F40	21.40	20.11	20.66				21.40	SB
11	Maryam Alzeyoudi	United Arab Emirates	F40	20.85	x	20.52				20.85	
12	Madina Mukhtorova	Uzbekistan	F40	20.20	x	x				20.20	
	Ibtissame El Garaa	Morocco	F41	x	x	x				NM	

== F44 ==
Final

The event took place on 29 September.

Rank	Name	Nationality	Сlass	#1	#2	#3	#4	#5	#6	Result	Notes
1st place, gold medalist(s)	Osiris Aneth Machado	Mexico	F44	40.13	38.84	42.06	44.36	44.22	41.52	44.36	CR
2nd place, silver medalist(s)	Samantha Heyison	United States	F44	36.61	36.93	40.65	40.03	39.66	39.32	40.65	
3rd place, bronze medalist(s)	Yao Juan	China	F44	x	x	39.23	x	x	x	39.23	SB
4	Funmi Oduwaiye	Great Britain	F44	x	37.31	37.91	x	35.52	36.59	37.91	
5	Bree Cronin	Great Britain	F44	35.75	36.81	37.08	36.63	x	37.69	37.69	
6	Ida Yessica Nesse	Norway	F44	33.54	34.29	33.94	36.11	34.53	33.96	36.11	PB
7	Sylvia Olero	Kenya	F44	23.17	24.17	27.06	x	25.74	22.74	27.06	
8	Angelina Kolesnikova	Uzbekistan	F44	20.57	21.06	19.63	20.75	24.48	23.19	24.48	PB

== F53 ==
Final

The event took place on 27 September.

Rank	Name	Nationality	Сlass	#1	#2	#3	#4	#5	#6	Result	Notes
1st place, gold medalist(s)	Elizabeth Rodrigues Gomes	Brazil	F53	17.35	17.06	16.61	15.12	15.67	17.10	17.35	CR
2nd place, silver medalist(s)	Zoia Ovsii	Ukraine	F51	13.98	12.94	13.14	14.16	13.79	12.79	14.16	CR
3rd place, bronze medalist(s)	Elena Gorlova	Neutral Paralympic Athletes	F52	13.01	12.80	12.70	12.70	13.10	12.88	13.10	SB
4	Leticia Ochoa	Mexico	F52	11.25	11.75	11.68	11.53	11.60	11.49	11.75	SB
5	Kanchan Lakhani	India	F53	8.28	8.01	x	8.81	9.68	x	9.68	SB
6	Ekaterina Potapova	Neutral Paralympic Athletes	F51	x	8.80	8.66	8.92	9.00	8.13	9.00	SB

== F55 ==
Final

The event took place on 5 October.

Rank	Name	Nationality	Сlass	#1	#2	#3	#4	#5	#6	Result	Notes
1st place, gold medalist(s)	Diāna Krumina	Latvia	F55	24.71	25.29	26.01	26.51	x	26.00	26.51	PB
2nd place, silver medalist(s)	Érica Castaño	Colombia	F55	24.92	25.05	24.89	25.16	24.91	24.79	25.16	SB
3rd place, bronze medalist(s)	María Guadalupe Navarro Hernández	Mexico	F55	24.57	24.78	25.02	x	24.24	24.57	25.02	
4	Rooba Al-Omari	Bahrain	F55	22.66	23.90	20.84	22.84	x	22.76	23.90	
5	Nataliia Chebakova	Neutral Paralympic Athletes	F55	20.42	22.04	20.31	21.39	20.99	22.88	22.88	PB
6	Sakshi Kasana	India	F55	21.85	22.04	22.47	22.06	22.16	22.02	22.47	SB
7	Karamjyoti Dalal	India	F55	15.63	x	18.13	20.44	19.84	21.12	21.12	
8	Pooja	India	F55	18.15	18.61	19.36	18.07	18.32	19.45	19.45	
9	Lucero Anahi Vazquez	Mexico	F54	11.03	9.96	10.45	x	10.03	10.79	11.03	
	Rosa María Guerrero	Mexico	F55	DQ							

== F57 ==
Final

The event took place on 28 September.

Rank	Name	Nationality	Сlass	#1	#2	#3	#4	#5	#6	Result	Notes
1st place, gold medalist(s)	Nassima Saifi	Algeria	F57	x	32.66	33.17	33.16	34.29	34.54	34.54	
2nd place, silver medalist(s)	Tian Yuxin	China	F57	29.34	29.93	29.93	29.85	30.30	30.25	30.30	SB
3rd place, bronze medalist(s)	Floralia Estrada Bernal	Mexico	F57	28.80	28.38	28.77	27.55	28.08	28.05	28.80	SB
4	Safia Djelal	Algeria	F57	x	x	x	21.80	28.20	x	28.20	SB
5	María de los Ángeles Ortiz	Mexico	F57	22.90	22.04	22.21	22.98	23.22	23.26	23.26	SB
6	Gabriela Navarro Rodriguez	Spain	F57	19.51	19.55	22.58	22.07	20.58	21.56	22.58	
7	Myadagmaa Tumursuren	Mongolia	F57	x	x	20.25	22.30	x	x	22.30	
8	Amalia Ortuño	Costa Rica	F57	15.61	16.47	17.96	17.27	18.17	18.98	18.98	PB
9	Miroslava Obrova	Czech Republic	F57	17.72	17.85	18.03	17.39	17.72	17.72	18.03	
	Zinabu Issah	Ghana	F56	DNS							

== F64 ==
Final

The event took place on 29 September.

Rank	Name	Nationality	Сlass	#1	#2	#3	#4	#5	#6	Result	Notes
1st place, gold medalist(s)	Faustyna Kotłowska	Poland	F64	36.08	38.96	36.28	37.73	38.52	37.50	38.96	SB
2nd place, silver medalist(s)	Jessica Heims	United States	F64	34.22	33.48	32.69	32.83	33.68	35.75	35.75	SB
3rd place, bronze medalist(s)	Alicia Guerrero	United States	F64	26.48	29.45	27.05	27.08	28.07	x	29.45	
4	Dayawanti	India	F64	26.28	27.11	27.50	27.85	26.57	27.94	27.94	AS
5	Chloe Chavez	United States	F64	24.33	26.30	26.61	25.21	26.31	26.87	26.87	SB
6	Addisyn Franceschini	Canada	F64	x	23.76	25.76	x	24.78	25.13	25.76	PB
