= Lito Anker =

Dutch para athlete (born 1996)

Personal information
- Full name: Carlos Anker
- Nationality: Dutch
- Born: 22 March 1996 (age 30) Marialva, Brazil

Sport
- Sport: wheelchair tennis Para athletics
- Disability: Congenital absence of tibiae and kneecaps
- Disability class: T54
- Events: 400 metres 800 metres 1500 metres Universal 4×100 metres relay
Medal record
Para-athletics
Representing Netherlands
World Championships
Gold medal – first place	2025 New Delhi	4 × 100 metres relay

Carlos "Lito" Anker (born 22 March 1996) is a Dutch T54 para athlete and former professional wheelchair tennis player. Born in Brazil with congenital leg malformations, he was adopted by Dutch parents and grew up in Arnhem, the Netherlands. Anker represented the Netherlands in wheelchair tennis at the 2020 Tokyo Paralympics, reaching the quarterfinals in doubles, before switching to wheelchair racing. He competed for the Netherlands at the 2025 World Para Athletics Championships in New Delhi.

== Career ==
Anker grew up in Arnhem after being adopted from Brazil as a baby. He was born without tibiae and kneecaps, and as a child wore leg braces.

He started out in disability football before switching to wheelchair tennis. As a teenager, he represented the Netherlands at international junior events, including the 2009 World Junior Championships in South Korea. He went on to qualify for the 2020 Summer Paralympics in Tokyo, where he reached the doubles quarterfinals in wheelchair tennis.

Following Tokyo 2020, Anker switched to wheelchair racing (T54). He quickly set Dutch records in the 400 metres and 800 metres, and in 2023 entered the Guinness World Records by completing the longest and longest-duration wheelchair wheelie: over 31 km and more than ten hours on his rear wheels.

In June 2025, he achieved his first major international breakthrough by setting three Dutch records in Arbon, Switzerland, securing his place for the 2025 World Para Athletics Championships. At the championships in New Delhi he competed in the 400 m, 800 m, 1500 m and the mixed-class 4 × 100 m universal relay, marking the Netherlands' debut in the event.

== Personal life ==
Anker was born as Carlos Anker in Marialva, Brazil, and adopted by Dutch parents at two months old. He later changed his first name to Lito. He is married to Sulgiy Kim and lives in Arnhem.

During his childhood and teenage years, Anker survived two near-death experiences: severe congenital health complications shortly after birth, and later, at age 18, a coma after accidentally ingesting a large dose of GHB at a party. These experiences, together with his Christian faith, shaped his outlook on life and sport.
