= Abdelhadi Boudra =

Algerian para athlete (born 1993)

Personal information
- Nationality: Algerian
- Born: 3 November 1993 (age 32)

Sport
- Country: Algeria
- Sport: Para athletics
- Disability class: T13
- Event: 5000 metres
Medal record
Men's para-athletics
Representing Algeria
World Championships
Silver medal – second place	2025 New Delhi	5000 m T13

Abdelhadi Boudra (born 3 November 1993) is an Algerian para-athlete specializing in long-distance running.

== Career ==
Boudra competed at the 2025 World Para Athletics Championships and won a silver medal in the 5000 metres T13 event with a time of 15:12.12. He also competed in the 1500 metres T13 and finished in fifth place with a time of 4:00.52.
