= Walid Ferhah =

Algerian Paralympic athlete

Personal information
- Nationality: Algerian
- Born: 4 May 1992 (age 34) Aïn Taya, Algiers, Algeria

Sport
- Country: Algeria
- Sport: Para athletics
- Disability class: F32
- Event: Club throw
Medal record
Men's para athletics
Representing Algeria
Paralympic Games
Bronze medal – third place	2020 Tokyo	Club Throw F32
World Championships
Gold medal – first place	2025 New Delhi	Club throw F32
Silver medal – second place	2024 Kobe	Club throw F32

Walid Ferhah (born 4 May 1992) is an Algerian club thrower. In his Paralympic Games debut, Ferhah won a bronze medal in the men's club throwing event.
