= 2023 World Para Athletics Championships =

Paralympic track and field event

- Host city: Paris
- Country: France
- Edition: 10
- Sport: Para-athletics
- Events: 171 (reduce to 168)
- Dates: 8–17 July 2023
- Main venue: Charléty Stadium

The 2023 World Para Athletics Championships was a Paralympic track and field meet organized by the World Para Athletics subcommittee of the International Paralympic Committee. It was the 10th edition of the event and was held in the Charlety Stadium in Paris, France, from 8 to 17 July 2023.

Paris was announced as the host city in December 2021. This was the third time France hosted the World Championships, following the editions in Lille (2002) and Lyon (2013).

== Schedule ==
Purple squares mark final heats scheduled.

Program: 171 medal events (93 in the men’s category, 77 in the women’s category and 1 in the mixed category).

Date →		9 Sun	10 Mon	11 Tues	12 Wed	13 Thurs	14 Fri	15 Sat	16 Sun	17 Mon
100 m	Men; Details	T72	T12; T37; T38		T13; T44; T64	T34	T53	T11; T36; T54	T35; T51; T52	T47; T63
100 m	Women; Details	T72	T13	T38; T47	T36	T11; T34; T37; T63; T64	T53; T54	T12		T35
200 m	Men; Details				T35; T37					T64; T51
200 m	Women; Details			T35	T13		T38	T36		T11; T12; T37; T47; T64
400 m	Men; Details			T34; T36; T53	T11; T54	T38; T52	T37; T47	T12; T13; T20		T62
400 m	Women; Details		T37	T11	T20	T12	T47	T53; T54		T13; T38
800 m	Men; Details							T53	T34	T34; T54
800 m	Women; Details			T53; T54						
1500 m	Men; Details	T52				T11; T13	T54		T46	T20; T38
1500 m	Women; Details		T11; T13			T54	T20			
5000 m	Men; Details		T11; T13; T54							
5000 m	Women; Details		T54							
4×100 m relay	Universal; Details								Universal	
High jump	Men; Details		T64	T47		T63				
Long jump	Men; Details	T11	T63		T12; T36	T47	T38; T64	T37		T13; T20
Long jump	Women; Details	T11	T64	T12; T37		T38		T63	T20; T47	
Shot put	Men; Details	F55; F37	F12	F53	F11; F41	F20; F32; F36	F46	F35	F38; F57	F33; F34; F63
Shot put	Women; Details	F41	F37	F20	F34; F54		F32; F46	F33; F35; F57; F64	F12	F40
Discus throw	Men; Details			F40; F52; F64	F56			F11; F64	F37	
Discus throw	Women; Details	F55	F57		F53	F11	F41			F38
Javelin throw	Men; Details	F38				F64	F34	F13	F46; F54	F41
Javelin throw	Women; Details		F13	F34	F46	F56				F54
Club throw	Men; Details						F51			
Club throw	Women; Details	F32							F51	

== Medal table ==
* Host nation (France)

Rank	Nation	Gold	Silver	Bronze	Total
1	China	16	16	13	45
2	Brazil	14	13	20	47
3	United States	10	14	15	39
4	Great Britain	10	8	11	29
5	Ukraine	10	6	6	22
6	Switzerland	9	5	0	14
7	Tunisia	7	1	4	12
8	Uzbekistan	6	7	4	17
9	Colombia	6	6	6	18
10	Poland	5	6	3	14
11	Italy	5	3	4	12
11	Thailand	5	3	4	12
13	Germany	5	2	5	12
14	Iran	4	6	2	12
15	Japan	4	3	4	11
16	Belgium	4	1	1	6
17	Cuba	4	0	1	5
18	Australia	3	8	3	14
19	India	3	4	3	10
20	Morocco	3	2	2	7
20	Netherlands	3	2	2	7
22	Algeria	3	1	3	7
23	Hungary	3	1	0	4
24	Canada	2	7	5	14
25	New Zealand	2	5	2	9
26	Spain	2	4	5	11
27	Ecuador	2	1	1	4
27	South Africa	2	1	1	4
29	Greece	2	0	2	4
30	Azerbaijan	2	0	1	3
30	Latvia	2	0	1	3
32	Bulgaria	2	0	0	2
33	Finland	1	2	3	6
34	Argentina	1	2	2	5
34	Mexico	1	2	2	5
34	Serbia	1	2	2	5
37	Malaysia	1	1	0	2
38	Turkey	1	0	2	3
39	Kenya	1	0	1	2
40	Jordan	1	0	0	1
40	Norway	1	0	0	1
42	Venezuela	0	3	1	4
43	Namibia	0	3	0	3
44	Nigeria	0	2	0	2
44	United Arab Emirates	0	2	0	2
46	Portugal	0	1	3	4
47	Iraq	0	1	2	3
47	Mauritius	0	1	2	3
49	Austria	0	1	1	2
49	Indonesia	0	1	1	2
49	Kuwait	0	1	1	2
49	Slovakia	0	1	1	2
53	Chile	0	1	0	1
53	Costa Rica	0	1	0	1
53	Denmark	0	1	0	1
53	Egypt	0	1	0	1
53	Saudi Arabia	0	1	0	1
58	France*	0	0	4	4
59	Sri Lanka	0	0	2	2
60	Croatia	0	0	1	1
60	Czech Republic	0	0	1	1
60	Kazakhstan	0	0	1	1
Totals (62 entries)		169	167	167	503

== Placing Table ==
Rank	Name (country)	Points
1	China	476
2	Brazil	410
3	United States	346
4	Great Britain	298.50
5	Ukraine	225
6	Australia	204
7	Poland	189.50
8	India	179
9	Colombia	171
10	Japan	168
11	Uzbekistan	155
12	Germany	152
13	Spain	139
14	Thailand	136
15	France	135
16	Canada	132
17	Tunisia	130
18	Iran	125
19	Switzerland	121
20	Algeria	121
Total (84 Nations)		171 Events

== 2024 Summer Paralympics ==
The 2023 World Para Athletics Championships served as the first qualifier event for all athletics events at the 2024 Summer Paralympics.

== Participation ==
1206 athletes from 103 National Paralympic Committees took part. Central African Republic, Costa Rica and Ivory Coast made their debut appearances.

- Algeria (23)
- Angola (4)
- Argentina (20)
- Armenia (4)
- Australia (39)
- Austria (5)
- Azerbaijan (15)
- Bahrain (4)
- Belgium (14)
- Bermuda (1)
- Bosnia and Herzegovina (1)
- Botswana (9)
- Brazil (54)
- Bulgaria (3)
- Cameroon (12)
- Canada (25)
- Cape Verde (3)
- Central African Republic (1)
- Chile (3)
- China (49)
- Chinese Taipei (5)
- Colombia (20)
- Costa Rica (3)
- Croatia (10)
- Cuba (9)
- Cyprus (2)
- Czech Republic (10)
- Denmark (12)
- Ecuador (15)
- Egypt (6)
- Estonia (1)
- Fiji (2)
- Finland (10)
- France (34) Host country
- Gambia (2)
- Georgia (1)
- Germany (27)
- Ghana (2)
- Great Britain (45)
- Greece (21)
- Guinea (1)
- Hong Kong (5)
- Hungary (9)
- Iceland (2)
- India (45) India at the World Para Athletics Championships 2023
- Indonesia (9)
- Iran (18)
- Iraq (7)
- Ireland (6)
- Israel (3)
- Italy (14)
- Ivory Coast (1)
- Jamaica (4)
- Japan (37)
- Jordan (1)
- Kazakhstan (3)
- Kenya (23)
- Kuwait (7)
- Latvia (6)
- Lithuania (18)
- Luxembourg (1)
- Malaysia (6)
- Mauritius (12)
- Mexico (17)
- Moldova (6)
- Mongolia (4)
- Montenegro (2)
- Morocco (18)
- Namibia (9)
- Netherlands (12)
- New Zealand (7)
- Nigeria (5)
- Norway (7)
- Oman (2)
- Panama (6)
- Papua New Guinea (2)
- Peru (3)
- Poland (42)
- Portugal (10)
- Puerto Rico (3)
- Qatar (3)
- Romania (5)
- Saudi Arabia (8)
- Senegal (8)
- Serbia (6)
- Singapore (4)
- Slovakia (3)
- Slovenia (1)
- South Africa (17)
- South Korea (8)
- Spain (30)
- Sri Lanka (3)
- Sweden (4)
- Switzerland (10)
- Thailand (22)
- Tunisia (16)
- Turkey (23)
- Uganda (3)
- Ukraine (31)
- United Arab Emirates (11)
- United States (45)
- Uzbekistan (24)
- Venezuela (5)

== See also ==
- 2023 World Athletics Championships, held in Budapest, Hungary
- 2023 World Para Swimming Championships, held in Manchester, Great Britain

== Results Book ==
- Official results book
