= Ahmed Mehideb =

Algerian para-athlete

Personal information
- Born: 18 January 1995 (age 31) El Milia, Algeria

Sport
- Country: Algeria
- Sport: Para-athletics
- Disability class: F32
- Event: Club throw
Medal record
Men's para-athletics
Representing Algeria
Paralympic Games
Bronze medal – third place	2024 Paris	Club throw F32
World Championships
Silver medal – second place	2025 New Delhi	Club throw F32

Ahmed Mehideb (born 18 January 1995) is an Algerian para-athlete specializing in the club throw. He competed at the 2024 Summer Olympics and won a bronze medal in the men's club throw F32 event.
