= 2025 World Para Athletics Championships – Women's 800 metres =

The women's 800 metres events at the 2025 World Para Athletics Championships were held at the Jawaharlal Nehru Stadium, Delhi in New Delhi.

== Medalists ==
Event	Gold	Silver	Bronze
T34	Hannah Cockroft; Great Britain	Kare Adenegan; Great Britain	Lan Hanyu; China
T53	Catherine Debrunner; Switzerland	Zhou Hongzhuan; China	—N/a
T54	Léa Bayekula; Belgium	Zhou Zhaoqian; China	Melanie Woods; Great Britain

== T34 ==
Final

The event took place on 4 October.

Rank	Name	Nationality	Time	Notes
1st place, gold medalist(s)	Hannah Cockroft	Great Britain	1:49.88	CR
2nd place, silver medalist(s)	Kare Adenegan	Great Britain	2:03.91	SB
3rd place, bronze medalist(s)	Lan Hanyu	China	2:05.14	AS
4	Fabienne André	Great Britain	2:11.36	
5	Moe Onodera	Japan	2:16.00	SB
6	Coco Espie	Australia	2:27.73	

== T53 ==
Final

The event took place on 29 September.

Rank	Name	Nationality	Time	Notes
1st place, gold medalist(s)	Catherine Debrunner	Switzerland	1:40.16	CR
2nd place, silver medalist(s)	Zhou Hongzhuan	China	1:47.71	SB
3	Hamide Doğangün	Turkey	1:47.99	PB
4	Sarah James	New Zealand	2:20.65	PB

== T54 ==
Final

The event took place on 29 September.

Rank	Name	Nationality	Time	Notes
1st place, gold medalist(s)	Léa Bayekula	Belgium	1:48.91	
2nd place, silver medalist(s)	Zhou Zhaoqian	China	1:49.46	SB
3rd place, bronze medalist(s)	Melanie Woods	Great Britain	1:49.59	
4	Tian Yajuan	China	1:50.01	SB
5	Noemi Alphonse	Mauritius	1:50.67	SB
6	Hannah Dederick	United States	1:50.82	
7	Patricia Eachus	Switzerland	1:51.19	
