= 2025 World Para Athletics Championships – Men's 5000 metres =

The men's 5000 metres events at the 2025 World Para Athletics Championships were held at the Jawaharlal Nehru Stadium, Delhi in New Delhi.

== Medalists ==
Event	Gold	Silver	Bronze
T11	Kenya Karasawa; Japan	Yeltsin Jacques; Brazil	Darwin Castro; Ecuador
T13	Aleksandr Kostin; Neutral Paralympic Athletes	Abdelhadi Boudra; Algeria	Jean Oliveira da Silva; Brazil
T54	Marcel Hug; Switzerland	Thibault Daurat; France	Putharet Khongrak; Thailand

== T11 ==
Final

The event took place on 27 September.

Rank	Name	Nationality	Time	Notes
1st place, gold medalist(s)	Kenya Karasawa	Japan	15:23.38	
2nd place, silver medalist(s)	Yeltsin Jacques	Brazil	15:29.73	SB
3rd place, bronze medalist(s)	Darwin Castro	Ecuador	16:39.89	SB
	Rosbil Guillen	Peru	DNF	
	Júlio Cesar Agripino	Brazil	DNF	
	Fedor Rudakov	Neutral Paralympic Athletes	DQ	
	Samwel Mushai Kimani	Kenya	DQ	
	Shinya Wada	Japan	DQ	

== T13 ==
Final

The event took place on 1 October.

Rank	Name	Nationality	Time	Notes
1st place, gold medalist(s)	Aleksandr Kostin	Neutral Paralympic Athletes	15:08.97	SB
2nd place, silver medalist(s)	Abdelhadi Boudra	Algeria	15:12.12	
3rd place, bronze medalist(s)	Jean Oliveira da Silva	Brazil	15:22.68	
4	John Lokedi	Kenya	15:24.82	SB
5	Jaryd Clifford	Australia	15:26.57	
6	Guillaume Ouellet	Canada	15:31.49	
7	Isaías Gomes	Portugal	15:38.05	PB
8	Michael Whittaker	New Zealand	15:38.13	
9	Nabeel Maqableh	Jordan	15:45.09	PB
10	Jonas Oryema	Uganda	15:46.99	
	Cyril Cloyd Ongcoy	Philippines	DNF	
	Sixto Roman Moreta Criollo	Ecuador	DQ	

== T54 ==
Final

The event took place on 28 September.

Rank	Name	Nationality	Time	Notes
1st place, gold medalist(s)	Marcel Hug	Switzerland	10:03.64	CR
2nd place, silver medalist(s)	Thibault Daurat	France	10:09.04	
3rd place, bronze medalist(s)	Putharet Khongrak	Thailand	10:49.32	
4	Samuel Rizzo	Australia	10:50.19	
5	Ludwig Malter	Austria	11:49.94	SB
