= 2023 World Para Athletics Championships – Women's long jump =

The women's long jump events at the 2023 World Para Athletics Championships were held at Charlety Stadium, Paris, France, from 9 to 16 July.

== Medalists ==
Event	Gold	Silver	Bronze
T11	Asila Mirzayorova; Uzbekistan	Lorena Salvatini Spoladore; Brazil	Zhou Guohua; China
T12	Oksana Zubkovska; Ukraine	Yokutkhon Kholbekova; Uzbekistan	Uran Sawada; Japan
T20	Karolina Kucharczyk; Poland	Zileide Cassiano da Silva; Brazil	Jardênia Félix; Brazil
T37	Wen Xiaoyan; China	Jaleen Roberts; United States	Manon Genest; France
T38	Luca Ekler; Hungary	Olivia Breen; Great Britain	Nele Moos; Germany
T47	Kiara Rodriguez; Ecuador	Anna Grimaldi; New Zealand	Taleah Williams; United States
T63	Martina Caironi; Italy	Elena Kratter; Switzerland	Vanessa Low; Australia
T64	Fleur Jong; Netherlands	Marlene van Gansewinkel; Netherlands	Maya Nakanishi; Japan

== Results ==
=== T11 ===
The event took place on 9 July.

Rank	Athlete	Result	Notes
1st place, gold medalist(s)	Asila Mirzayorova (UZB)	5.13	CR
2nd place, silver medalist(s)	Lorena Salvatini Spoladore (BRA)	4.91	SB
3rd place, bronze medalist(s)	Zhou Guohua (CHN)	4.83	
4	Alba Garcia Falagan (ESP)	4.82	PB
5	Silvânia Costa (BRA)	4.59	
6	Arjola Dedaj (ITA)	4.56	
7	Delya Boulaghlem (FRA)	4.38	
8	Rosário Coppola (ARG)	3.88	

=== T12 ===
The event took place on 11 July.

Rank	Athlete	Result	Notes
1st place, gold medalist(s)	Oksana Zubkovska (UKR)	5.78	SB
2nd place, silver medalist(s)	Yokutkhon Kholbekova (UZB)	5.54	
3rd place, bronze medalist(s)	Uran Sawada (JPN)	5.23	SB
4	Iida Lounela (FIN)	5.16	
5	Sara Martínez Puntero (ESP)	4.98	SB
6	Katrin Mueller-Rottgardt (GER)	4.91	
7	Sara Fernández Roldán (ESP)	4.62	
8	Emine Avsar (TUR)	4.35	
9	Wang Cai-Syuan (TPE)	3.64	

=== T20 ===
The event took place at 18:34 on 16 July.

Rank	Athlete	Result	Notes
1st place, gold medalist(s)	Karolina Kucharczyk (POL)	6.08	SB
2nd place, silver medalist(s)	Zileide Cassiano da Silva (BRA)	5.97	=AR
3rd place, bronze medalist(s)	Jardenia Felix (BRA)	5.49	
4	Sonomi Sakai (JPN)	5.44	AR
5	Mikela Ristoski (CRO)	5.4	
6	Esra Bayrak (TUR)	5.39	SB
7	Fatma Damla Altin (TUR)	5.38	SB
8	Ana Filipe (POR)	5.27	
9	Lizanshela Angulo (ECU)	5.22	PB
10	Stefania Gudmundsdottir (ISL)	5.09	PB
11	Claudia Santos (POR)	4.87	
12	Nani Shahiera Zawawi (MAS)	4.65	
13	Ashley Telvave (MRI)	4.5	
14	Anke Sneyers (BEL)	4.45	
15	Adel Takacs (HUN)	4.29	
16	Kiara Maene (BEL)	4.18	SB

=== T37 ===
The final of this event took place at 19:22 on 11 Jul 2023 at Charlety Stadium, Paris, France.

Rank	Athlete	Attempts						Result	Notes
Rank	Athlete	1	2	3	4	5	6		
1st place, gold medalist(s)	Wen Xiaoyan (CHN)	5.09	5.09	5.02	5.33	-	-	5.33	WR
2nd place, silver medalist(s)	Jaleen Roberts (USA)	5.00	4.84	4.44	4.56	X	4.56	5.00	SB
3rd place, bronze medalist(s)	Manon Genest (FRA)	4.72	4.56	4.55	4.34	4.30	4.76	4.76	PB
4	Anais Angeline (MRI)	4.25	4.28	4.14	4.21	4.25	X	4.28	
5	Mandy Francois-Elie (FRA)	4.19	3.91	3.82	3.89	3.51	4.01	4.19	
6	Selma Van Kerm (BEL)	3.92	3.53	3.59	3.79	3.61	3.74	3.92	

=== T38 ===
The final of this event took place at 19:58 on 13 Jul 2023 at Charlety Stadium, Paris, France.

Rank	Athlete	Attempts						Result	Notes
Rank	Athlete	1	2	3	4	5	6		
1st place, gold medalist(s)	Luca Ekler (HUN)	5.77	X	X	5.72	5.50	5.76	5.77	CR
2nd place, silver medalist(s)	Olivia Breen (GBR)	4.62	4.95	4.77	4.71	5.04	X	5.04	SB
3rd place, bronze medalist(s)	Nele Moos (GER)	X	4.48	4.62	4.65	4.47	4.61	4.65	PB
4	Friederike Brose (GER)	4.31	4.41	4.18	X	X	4.26	4.41	
5	Vilma Berg (FIN)	3.98	X	X	X	X	4.40	4.40	=PB
6	Anna Trener-Wierciak (POL)	X	4.23	X	X	4.00	4.13	4.23	SB
7	Romane Boulard (FRA)	4.14	X	3.84	3.77	X	3.86	4.14	PB

=== T47 ===
The final of this event took place at 9:20 on 16 Jul 2023 at Charlety Stadium, Paris, France.

Rank	Athlete	Attempts						Result	Notes
Rank	Athlete	1	2	3	4	5	6	Result	Notes
1st place, gold medalist(s)	Kiara Rodriguez (ECU)	5.80	5.67	6.23	5.96	X	-	6.23	WR
2nd place, silver medalist(s)	Anna Grimaldi (NZL)	5.75	5.91	X	5.90	5.96	X	5.96	PB
3rd place, bronze medalist(s)	Taleah Williams (USA)	X	5.62	5.65	5.44	5.12	X	5.65	PB
4	Paola del Valle Garcia (VEN)	5.45	5.38	5.31	5.23	5.33	5.19	5.45	PB
5	Bjoerk Noerremark (DEN)	5.35	5.07	5.17	X	5.31	5.24	5.35	PB
6	Angelina Lanza (FRA)	5.25	X	X	X	X	X	5.25	
7	Petra Luteran (HUN)	4.83	X	5.23	5.13	4.99	5.14	5.23	PB
8	Ability Udo (NGR)	4.74	5.17	4.78	X	4.83	4.90	5.17	AR
9	Felipa Isis Hechavarria (CUB)	5.14	4.88	4.99	—N/a			5.14	
11	Isabel Ibanez Aldana (ARG)	5.02	5.10	4.97	—N/a			5.10	SB
12	Styliani Smaragdi (GRE)	5.01	4.76	4.97	—N/a			5.01	
13	Maria Clara Augusto (BRA)	5.00	4.77	4.85	—N/a			5.00	
14	Jule Ross (GER)	4.84	4.64	4.49	—N/a			4.84	
15	Kim Marie Vaske (GER)	4.57	4.34	4.56	—N/a			4.57	

=== T63 ===
The final of this event took place at 18:40 on 15 Jul 2023 at Charlety Stadium, Paris, France.

Rank	Athlete	Attempts						Result	Notes
Rank	Athlete	1	2	3	4	5	6	Result	Notes
1	Martina Caironi (ITA)	4.66	2.7	5.17	5.18	X	4.75	5.18	CR
2	Elena Kratter (SUI)	4.67	4.54	4.69	4.17	X	4.91	4.91	SB
3	Vanessa Low (AUS)	4.32	4.45	4.87	X	X	4.9	4.9	CR
4	Tomomi Tozawa (JPN)	4.47	4.36	4.59	4.36	X	X	4.59	
5	Desiree Vila Bargiela (ESP)	4.14	3.91	X	3.99	4.16	4.33	4.33	PB
6	Kaede Maegawa (JPN)	X	4.14	4.19	X	4.11	X	4.19	
7	Fleur Schouten (NED)	4.08	4.04	X	4.13	3.94	3.98	4.13	

=== T64 ===
The event took place on 10 July.

Rank	Athlete	Result	Notes
1st place, gold medalist(s)	Fleur Jong (NED)	6.28	CR
2nd place, silver medalist(s)	Marlene van Gansewinkel (NED)	5.40	
3rd place, bronze medalist(s)	Maya Nakanishi (JPN)	5.38	SB
4	Beatriz Hatz (USA)	5.03	
5	Sarah Walsh (AUS)	4.84	
6	Sara Andrés Barrio (ESP)	4.74	
7	Amaris Vazquez (PUR)	4.38	PB
8	Tezna Abrahams (RSA)	4.36	AR
9	Giuliana Filippi (ITA)	4.01	
10	Typhaine Soldé (FRA)	3.63	
