= Athletics at the 2024 Summer Paralympics – Women's long jump =

The Women's long jump athletics events for the 2024 Summer Paralympics took place at the Stade de France, Paris from August 30 to September 6, 2024. A total of 8 events were contested in this discipline. All eight events went directly to final.

== Schedule ==
R	Round 1	½	Semifinals	F	Final

Date	Fri 30		Sat 31		Sun 1		Mon 2		Tue 3		Wed 4		Thu 5		Fri 6	
Event	M	E	M	E	M	E	M	E	M	E	M	E	M	E	M	E
T11	F															
T12					F											
T20																F
T37						F										
T38										F						
T47															F	
T63														F		
T64			F													

== Medal summary ==
The following is a summary of the medals awarded across all long jump events.

Classification	Gold		Silver		Bronze	
T11	Asila Mirzayorova; Uzbekistan	5.24	Zhou Guohua; China	4.91	Alba Garcia Falagan; Spain	4.76
T12	Oksana Zubkovska; Ukraine	5.78	Sara Martinez; Spain	5.40	Lynda Hamri; Algeria	5.30
T20	Karolina Kucharczyk; Poland	5.82	Zileide Cassiano da Silva; Brazil	5.76	Fatma Damla Altin; Turkey	5.73
T37	Wen Xiaoyan; China	5.44	Jaleen Roberts; United States	4.77	Manon Genest; France	4.59
T38	Luca Ekler; Hungary	5.56	Nele Moos; Germany	5.13	Karen Palomeque; Colombia	4.99
T47	Kiara Rodriguez; Ecuador	6.05	Petra Luteran; Hungary	5.85	Bjoerk Noerremark; Denmark	5.76
T63	Vanessa Low; Australia	5.45	Martina Caironi; Italy	5.06	Elena Kratter; Switzerland	4.83
T64	Fleur Jong; Netherlands	6.53	Marlene van Gansewinkel; Netherlands	5.87	Beatriz Hatz; United States	5.38

== Results ==
=== T11 ===
Women's long Jump T11 at the XVII Paralympic Games
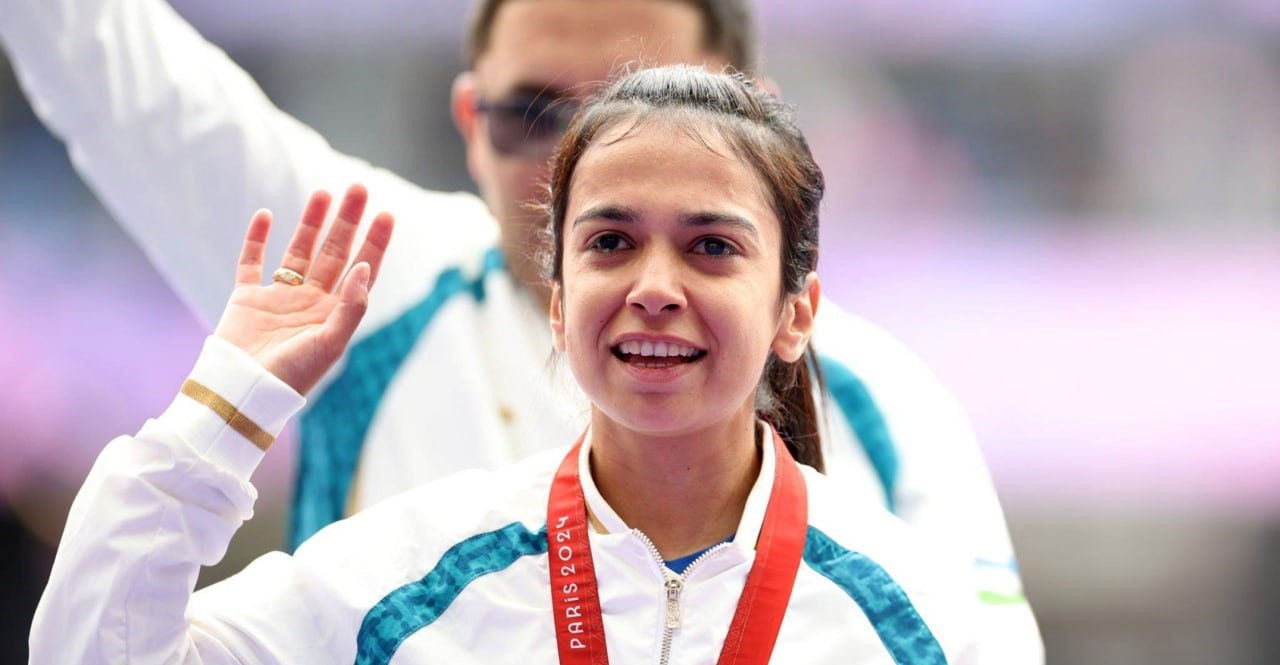
- Venue: Stade de France, Paris
- Competitors: 11 from 8 nations
- Winning distance: 5.24

Medalists
1st place, gold medalist(s)		Asila Mirzayorova	Uzbekistan
2nd place, silver medalist(s)		Zhou Guohua	China
3rd place, bronze medalist(s)		Alba Garcia Falagan	Spain

The T11 category is for athletes with a visual impairment. A T11 athlete may be entirely without sight, or be able to perceive light, but have no ability to see the shape of a hand at any distance. T11 athletes commonly run with guides.

Records

Prior to this competition, the existing world, Paralympic, and area records were as follows:

World record	Silvania Costa de Oliveira (BRA)	5.46	(Brazil) São Paulo	17 July 2016
Paralympic record	Purificacion Ortiz (ESP)	5.07	(United States) Atlanta	19 August 1996

Area	Distance (m)	Athlete	Nation
Africa	vacant		
America	5.85	Silvania Costa de Oliveira	Brazil
Asia	5.25	Asila Mirzayorova	Uzbekistan
Europe	5.21	Purificacion Ortiz	Spain
Oceania	vacant		

Results

The final in this classification took place on 30 August 2024, at 9:30: After the first three rounds, the athletes below eighth were eliminated and the top eight proceeded to the final three rounds.

Rank	Athlete	Nationality	1	2	3	4	5	6	Best	Notes
1st place, gold medalist(s)	Asila Mirzayorova	Uzbekistan	5.22	5.12	5.19	4.89	5.24	5.12	5.24	PR,=AR
2nd place, silver medalist(s)	Zhou Guohua	China	4.91	4.83	4.81	4.11	x	4.60	4.91	SB
3rd place, bronze medalist(s)	Alba Garcia Falagan	Spain	4.76	x	1.40	4.59	x	x	4.76	
4	Arjola Dedaj	Italy	4.55	x	4.47	4.47	4.52	4.75	4.75	PB
5	Delya Boulaghlem	France	4.36	x	4.42	x	4.48	4.20	4.48	
6	Alice Correa	Brazil	x	4.35	4.26	1.36	4.38	4.24	4.38	
7	Franyeli Vargas Ruiz	Venezuela	3.76	4.10	4.04	3.16	x	4.18	4.18	
8	Trinidad Molina Coppola	Argentina	3.77	3.93	4.03	3.87	3.96	4.05	4.05	
9	Rosibel Colmenares	Venezuela	3.86	3.9	x				3.90	
10	Sofia Casse	Argentina	3.77	3.82	x				3.82	
11	Lorena Salvatini Spoladore	Brazil	1.4	x	3.67				3.67	

=== T12 ===
Women's long Jump T12 at the XVII Paralympic Games
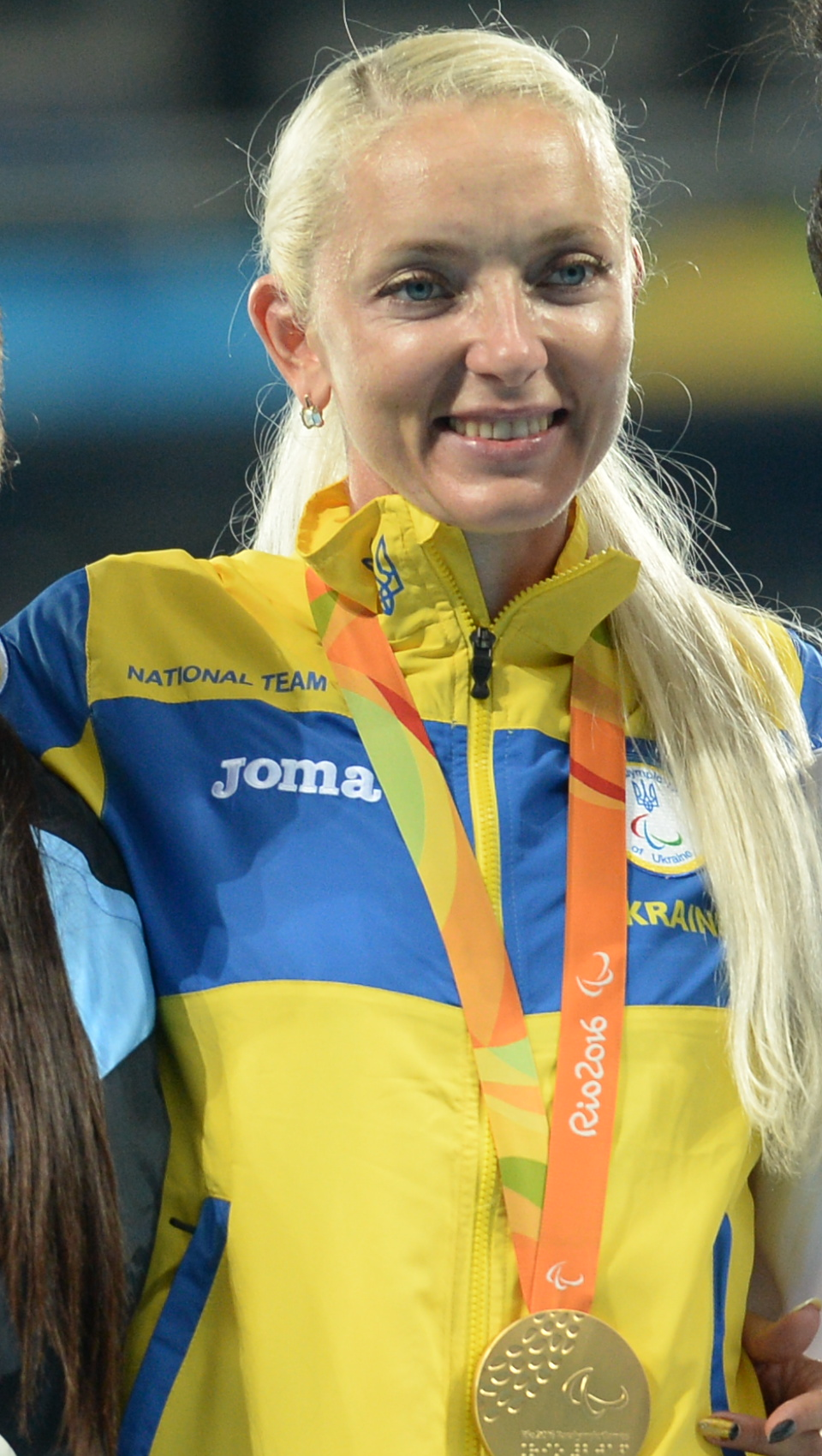
- Venue: Stade de France, Paris
- Competitors: from 6 nations
- Winning distance: 5.78

Medalists
1st place, gold medalist(s)		Oksana Zubkovska	Ukraine
2nd place, silver medalist(s)		Sara Martinez	Spain
3rd place, bronze medalist(s)		Lynda Hamri	Algeria

The T12 category is for athletes with visual impairment. Athletes in this category will generally have some residual sight, the ability to recognise the shape of a hand at a distance of 2 metres and the ability to perceive clearly will be no more than 2/60. T12 athletes commonly run with guides.

Records

Prior to this competition, the existing world, Paralympic, and area records were as follows:

World record	Oksana Zubkovska (UKR)	6.60	(United Kingdom) London	7 September 2012
Paralympic record	Oksana Zubkovska (UKR)	6.60	(United Kingdom) London	7 September 2012

Area	Distance (m)	Athlete	Nation
Africa	5.71	Lynda Hamri	Algeria
America	5.71	Daineris Mijans	Cuba
Asia	5.74	Liu Miaomiao	China
Europe	6.60 WR	Oksana Zubkovska	Ukraine
Oceania	vacant		

Results

The final in this classification took place on 1 September 2024, at 9:30:

Rank	Athlete	Nationality	1	2	3	4	5	6	Best	Notes
1st place, gold medalist(s)	Oksana Zubkovska	Ukraine	5.64	5.75	-	5.63	5.78	5.70	5.78	SB
2nd place, silver medalist(s)	Sara Martinez	Spain	5.35	5.24	x	5.26	x	5.40	5.40	SB
3rd place, bronze medalist(s)	Lynda Hamri	Algeria	5.28	5.30	5.28	5.30	5.25	x	5.30	SB
4	Iida Lounela	Finland	5.17	5.18	5.19	5.02	4.98	5.17	5.19	=PB
5	Katrin Mueller-Rottgardt	Germany	4.90	4.82	4.84	4.75	4.91	4.91	4.91	
6	Uran Sawada	Japan	4.67	4.78	x	4.76	4.90	4.67	4.90	
7	Sydney Fokou Takam	Spain	4.75	4.55	4.78	4.66	4.84	4.64	4.84	
8	Sara Fernandez Roldan	Spain	4.56	4.73	4.75	x	4.71	4.59	4.75	
9	Yokutkhon Kholbekova	Uzbekistan	3.43	2.46	2.85				3.43	

=== T20 ===
Women's long Jump T20 at the XVII Paralympic Games
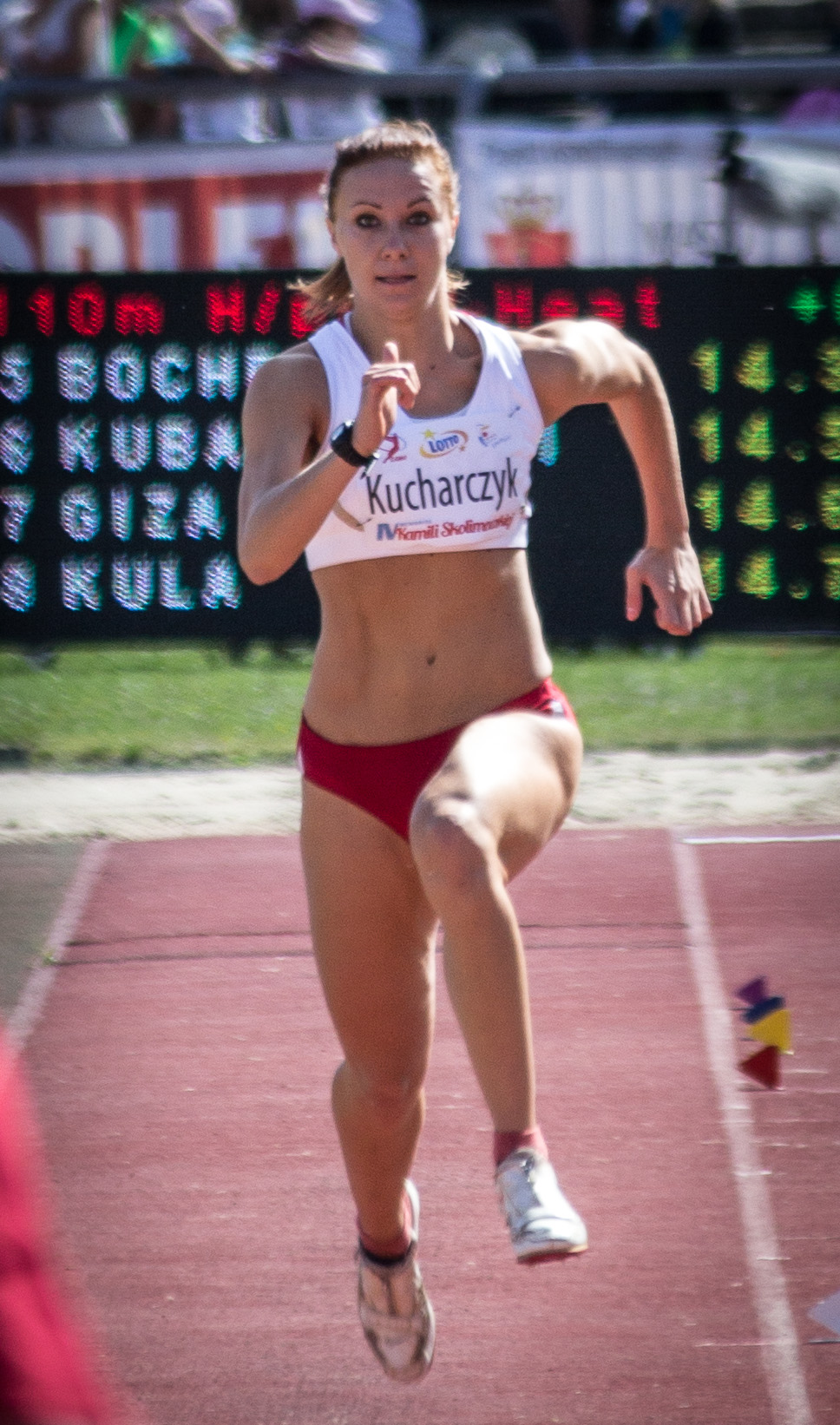
- Venue: Stade de France, Paris
- Dates: 6 September 2024
- Competitors: 15
- Winning distance: 5.82

Medalists
1st place, gold medalist(s)		Karolina Kucharczyk	Poland
2nd place, silver medalist(s)		Zileide Cassiano da Silva	Brazil
3rd place, bronze medalist(s)		Fatma Damla Altin	Turkey

The T20 category is for athletes with intellectual impairment. T20 athletes have an IQ score of 75 or less.

Records

Prior to this competition, the existing world, Paralympic, and area records were as follows:

World record	Karolina Kucharczyk (POL)	6.21	(United Arab Emirates) Dubai	14 November 2019
Paralympic record	Karolina Kucharczyk (POL)	6.03	(Japan) Tokyo	3 September 2021

Area	Distance (m)	Athlete	Nation
Africa	vacant		
America	6.19	Zileide Cassiano da Silva	Brazil
Asia	5.44	Sonomi Sakai	Japan
Europe	6.21 WR	Karolina Kucharczyk	Poland
Oceania	4.87	Caytlyn Sharp	Australia

Results

The final in this classification took place on 6 September 2024, at 19:00:

Rank	Athlete	Nationality	1	2	3	4	5	6	Best	Notes
1st place, gold medalist(s)	Karolina Kucharczyk	Poland	5.52	5.70	5.78	5.82	5.68	5.36	5.82	SB
2nd place, silver medalist(s)	Zileide Cassiano da Silva	Brazil	5.76	5.72	5.23	5.55	3.70	5.54	5.76	
3rd place, bronze medalist(s)	Fatma Damla Altin	Turkey	5.66	5.63	5.60	5.73	5.66	x	5.73	PB
4	Esra Bayrak	Turkey	5.32	x	5.38	x	5.20	5.64	5.64	PB
5	Jardênia Félix	Brazil	5.57	x	5.31	5.21	x	5.22	5.57	
6	Debora Oliveira de Lima	Brazil	x	5.3	5.49	5.4	5.38	x	5.49	
7	Ana Filipe	Portugal	5.35	5.42	5.48	x	x	x	5.48	SB
8	Aleksandra Ruchkina	Neutral Paralympic Athletes	5.22	5.04	5.13	5.08	x	3.32	5.22	
9	Telaya Blacksmith	Australia	x	5.21	x				5.21	AR
10	Mikela Ristoski	Croatia	x	5.10	5.18				5.18	
11	María Alejandra Murillo	Colombia	5.14	4.95	5.14				5.14	
12	Reyhan Tasdelen	Turkey	5.11	4.99	4.95				5.11	
13	Sonomi Sakai	Japan	4.78	3.29	4.87				4.87	
14	Paula Diana Carolina Vivenes	Dominican Republic	4.54	4.72	3.72				4.72	SB
15	Hao Lei Chio	Macau	3.97	4.17	4.15				4.17	SB

=== T37 ===
Women's long Jump T37 at the XVII Paralympic Games
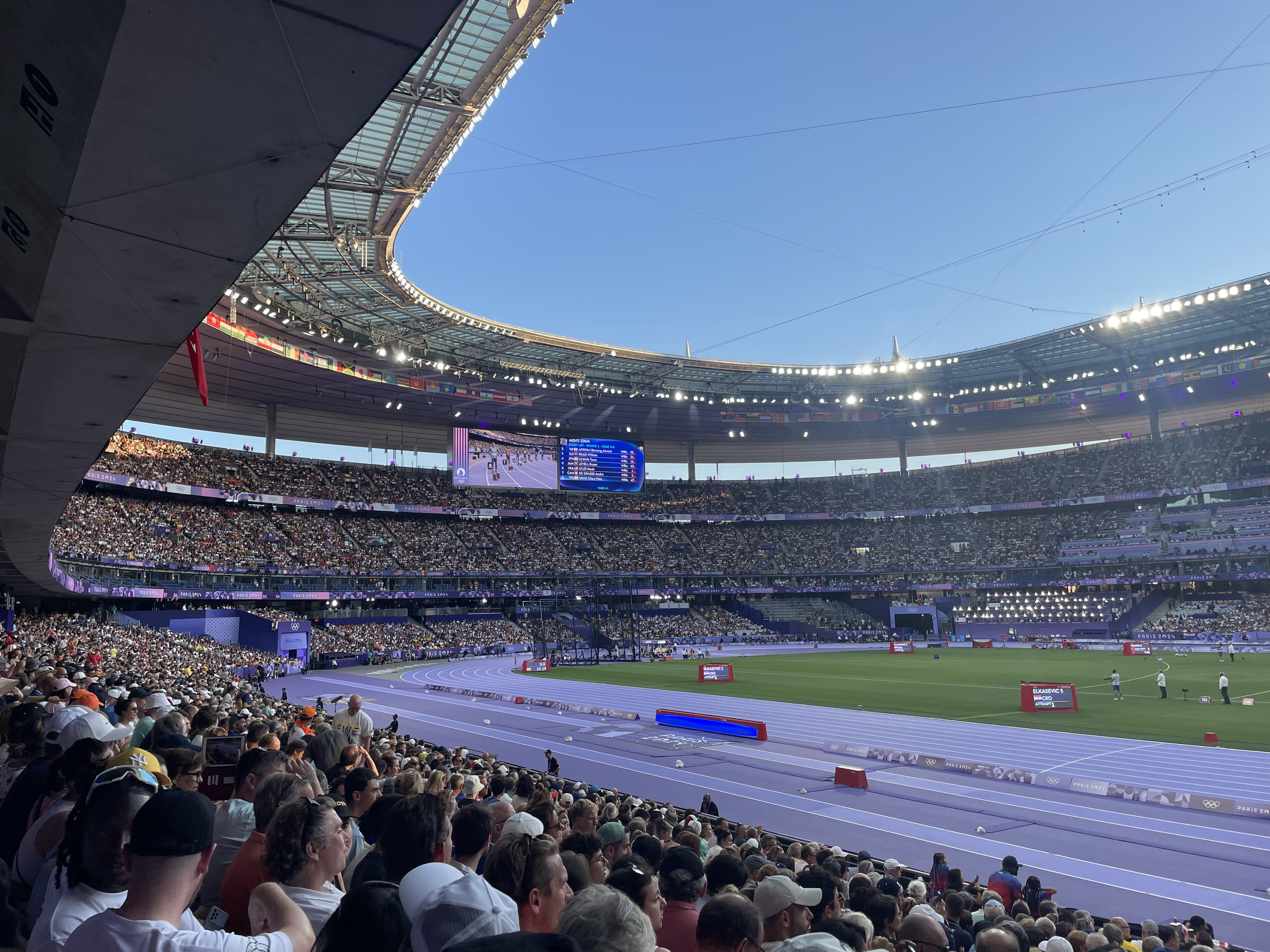
- Venue: Stade de France, Paris
- Competitors: 8
- Winning distance: 5.44

Medalists
1st place, gold medalist(s)		Wen Xiaoyan	China
2nd place, silver medalist(s)		Jaleen Roberts	United States
3rd place, bronze medalist(s)		Manon Genest	France

The T37 category is for ambulant athletes with cerebral palsy. These athletes have movement and coordination problems on one half of their body. They have good ability in their dominant side of their body (ie hemiplegia).

Records

Prior to this competition, the existing world, Paralympic, and area records were as follows:

World record	Wen Xiaoyan (CHN)	5.45	Hangzhou (China)	24 October 2023
Paralympic record	Wen Xiaoyan (CHN)	5.14	Rio de Janeiro (Brazil)	14 September 2016

Area	Distance (m)	Athlete	Nation
Africa	4.52	Anais Angeline	Mauritius
America	5.08	Jaleen Roberts	United States
Asia	5.45 WR	Wen Xiaoyan	China
Europe	4.89	Zhanna Fekolina	Russia
Oceania	4.92	Lisa McIntosh	Australia

Results

The final in this classification took place on 1 September 2024, at 19:12:

Rank	Athlete	Nationality	1	2	3	4	5	6	Best	Notes
1st place, gold medalist(s)	Wen Xiaoyan	China	5.23	5.24	5.27	5.44	5.32	x	5.44	PR, SB
2nd place, silver medalist(s)	Jaleen Roberts	United States	4.77	4.25	4.59	4.50	4.54	x	4.77	
3rd place, bronze medalist(s)	Manon Genest	France	4.45	4.58	4.59	4.25	4.47	4.12	4.59	=SB
4	Elena Tretiakova	Neutral Paralympic Athletes	4.25	4.30	4.37	4.37	4.11	3.96	4.37	
5	Mandy Francois-Elie	France	x	4.11	4.05	x	3.83	4.31	4.31	
6	Anais Angeline	Mauritius	4.19	4.28	4.18	4.09	4.14	x	4.28	
7	Laura Burbulla	Germany	3.84	3.76	3.77	3.95	x	3.72	3.95	
8	Liezel Gouws	South Africa	x	3.34	x	3.56	3.62	3.04	3.62	

=== T38 ===
Women's long Jump T38 at the XVII Paralympic Games
- Venue: Stade de France, Paris
- Competitors: 12
- Winning distance: 5.56

Medalists
1st place, gold medalist(s)		Luca Ekler	Hungary
2nd place, silver medalist(s)		Nele Moos	Germany
3rd place, bronze medalist(s)		Karen Palomeque	Colombia

The T38 category is for ambulant athletes with cerebral palsy. T38 athletes have the mildest form of impairment caused by cerebral palsy, often in only one limb, and not affecting the ability to run, walk or jump freely, although impairing performance. T38 athletes may suffer minor co-ordination difficulties.

Records

Prior to this competition, the existing world, Paralympic, and area records were as follows:

World record	Luca Ekler (HUN)	5.82	Paris (France)	10 June 2022
Paralympic record	Luca Ekler (HUN)	5.63	Tokyo (Japan)	31 August 2021

Area	Distance (m)	Athlete	Nation
Africa	4.23	Juanelie Meijer	South Africa
America	4.97	Karen Palomeque	Colombia
Asia	4.79	Chen Zimo	China
Europe	5.82 WR	Luca Ekler	Hungary
Oceania	4.62	Taylor Doyle	Australia

Results

The final in this classification took place on 3 September 2024, at 19:00:

Rank	Athlete	Nationality	1	2	3	4	5	6	Best	Notes
1st place, gold medalist(s)	Luca Ekler	Hungary	5.52	5.56	x	x	x	x	5.56	PB
2nd place, silver medalist(s)	Nele Moos	Germany	4.48	x	4.9	x	4.93	5.13	5.13	PB
3rd place, bronze medalist(s)	Karen Palomeque	Colombia	4.74	4.89	4.86	4.99	4.77	4.74	4.99	AR
4	Olivia Breen	Great Britain	4.99	4.79	4.73	4.54	4.65	x	4.99	
5	Zimo Chen	China	4.70	4.79	4.98	4.54	4.56	4.66	4.98	AR
6	Maddie Down	Great Britain	4.71	4.24	4.65	4.81	4.67	x	4.81	PB
7	Margarita Goncharova	Neutral Paralympic Athletes	4.74	x	4.45	4.51	4.59	4.62	4.74	
8	Catarina Guimaraes	United States	x	4.30	4.35	4.35	4.25	x	4.35	
9	Friederike Brose	Germany	3.89	4.35	4.05				4.35	
10	Vilma Berg	Finland	4.25	x	x				4.25	
11	Lola Desfeuillet	France	4.04	3.74	x				4.04	
12	Anna Trener-Wierciak	Poland	x	3.95	x				3.95	

=== T47 ===
Women's long Jump T46 at the XVII Paralympic Games
- Venue: Stade de France, Paris
- Competitors: 11
- Winning distance: 6.05

Medalists
1st place, gold medalist(s)		Kiara Rodriguez	Ecuador
2nd place, silver medalist(s)		Petra Luteran	Hungary
3rd place, bronze medalist(s)		Bjoerk Noerremark	Denmark

The T47 category is for athletes who have a single below elbow or wrist amputation or similar disability, with normal function in both legs.

Records

Prior to this competition, the existing world, Paralympic, and area records were as follows:

World record	Kiara Rodriguez (ECU)	6.23	Paris (FRA)	16 JUL 2023
Paralympic record	Anna Grimaldi (NZL)	5.76	Tokyo (JPN)	3 SEP 2021

Area	Distance (m)	Athlete	Nation
Africa	5.17	Ability Ujo	Nigeria
America	6.23 WR	Kiara Rodriguez	Ecuador
Asia	5.41	Ouyang Jingling	China
Europe	5.92	Nikol Rodomakina	Russia
Oceania	6.01	Carlee Beattie	Australia

Results

The final in this classification took place on 6 September 2024, at 9:35:

Rank	Athlete	Nationality	1	2	3	4	5	6	Best	Notes
1st place, gold medalist(s)	Kiara Rodriguez	Ecuador	6.05	x	5.93	x	5.86	2.76	6.05	PR
2nd place, silver medalist(s)	Petra Luteran	Hungary	5.63	5.53	5.81	5.62	5.66	5.85	5.85	PB
3rd place, bronze medalist(s)	Bjoerk Noerremark	Denmark	5.57	5.23	5.45	5.05	5.18	5.76	5.76	PB
4	Anna Grimaldi	New Zealand	x	5.65	4.03	5.75	5.74	x	5.75	
5	Paola del Valle Garcia Ramos	Venezuela	5.36	5.56	5.4	5.27	x	x	5.56	PB
6	Taleah Williams	United States	5.28	5.3	5.33	5.07	x	5.28	5.33	
7	Angelina Lanza	France	5.12	x	5.09	x	5.2	5.1	5.2	
8	Felipa Hechavarria	Cuba	4.58	x	5.15	x	x	4.64	5.15	
9	Janani Wickramasingha	Sri Lanka	x	x	4.96				4.96	
10	Isabel Ibanez	Argentina	4.42	x	4.95				4.95	
11	Jule Ross	Germany	4.7	4.84	4.83				4.84	

=== T63 ===
Women's long Jump T63 at the XVII Paralympic Games
- Venue: Stade de France, Paris
- Competitors: 9
- Winning distance: 5.45

Medalists
1st place, gold medalist(s)		Vanessa Low	Australia
2nd place, silver medalist(s)		Martina Caironi	Italy
3rd place, bronze medalist(s)		Elena Kratter	Switzerland

Records

Prior to this competition, the existing world, Paralympic, and area records were as follows:

World record	Vanessa Low (AUS)	5.33	Canberra (AUS)	26 JAN 2024
Paralympic record	Vanessa Low (AUS)	5.28	Tokyo (JPN)	2 SEP 2021

Area	Distance (m)	Athlete	Nation
Africa	vacant		
America	5.23	Noelle Lambert	United States
Asia	4.82	Tomomi Tozawa	Japan
Europe	5.46	Martina Caironi	Italy
Oceania	5.45 WR	Vanessa Low	Australia

Results

The final in this classification took place on 5 September 2024, at 19:00:

Rank	Athlete	Nationality	1	2	3	4	5	6	Best	Notes
1st place, gold medalist(s)	Vanessa Low	Australia	5.45	5.4	5.44	5.28	5.45	x	5.45	WR
2nd place, silver medalist(s)	Martina Caironi	Italy	x	4.63	3.52	x	5.06	x	5.06	
3rd place, bronze medalist(s)	Elena Kratter	Switzerland	4.66	4.8	4.83	4.7	4.77	4.61	4.83	SB
4	Noelle Lambert	United States	x	4.66	x	4.61	4.47	x	4.66	
5	Tomomi Tozawa	Japan	4.46	x	4.58	x	4.53	x	4.58	
6	Kaede Maegawa	Japan	4.5	4	x	4.22	x	4.08	4.5	
7	Emilie Aaen	Denmark	4.16	4.43	4.14	4.2	4.48	4.28	4.48	
8	Lindi Marcusen	United States	4.17	4.09	4.37	4.37	3.97	x	4.37	
9	Desiree Vila Bargiela	Spain	x	x	3.98				3.98	

=== T64 ===
Women's long Jump T64 at the XVII Paralympic Games
- Venue: Stade de France, Paris
- Competitors: 12
- Winning distance: 6.53

Medalists
1st place, gold medalist(s)		Fleur Jong	Netherlands
2nd place, silver medalist(s)		Marlene van Gansewinkel	Netherlands
3rd place, bronze medalist(s)		Beatriz Hatz	United States

Records

Prior to this competition, the existing world, Paralympic, and area records were as follows:

World record	Marie-Amélie Le Fur (FRA)	6.14	(United States) Miramar	19 July 2024
Paralympic record	vacant			

Area	Distance (m)	Athlete	Nation
Africa	vacant		
America	5.57	Beatriz Hatz	United States
Asia	5.70	Maya Nakanishi	Japan
Europe	6.14	Marie-Amélie Le Fur	France
Oceania	5.49	Sarah Walsh	Australia

Results

The final in this classification took place on 31 August 2024, at 10:42:

Rank	Athlete	Nationality	1	2	3	4	5	6	Best	Notes
1st place, gold medalist(s)	Fleur Jong	Netherlands	6.20	6.52	6.17	x	x	6.53	6.53	PR,AR=SB
2nd place, silver medalist(s)	Marlene van Gansewinkel	Netherlands	5.87	5.58	x	5.44	5.41	5.82	5.87	PB
3rd place, bronze medalist(s)	Beatriz Hatz	United States	x	4.78	5.38	5.17	x	5.16	5.38	
4	Kiki Hendriks	Netherlands	5.19	5.00	x	5.17	5.35	5.20	5.35	
5	Saki Takakuwa	Japan	x	4.89	x	4.63	4.90	5.04	5.04	SB
6	Annie Carey	United States	4.72	4.96	4.53	4.73	4.69	4.47	4.96	PR
7	Maya Nakanishi	Japan	4.91	x	x	4.77	x	x	4.91	
8	Sarah Walsh	Australia	4.88	4.76	4.84	4.77	x	4.85	4.88	
9	Chiara Filippi Giuliana	Italy	4.49	4.54	x				4.54	
10	Sara Andres Barrio	Spain	4.08	4.52	x				4.52	
11	Kirstin Abrahams Tezna	South Africa	4.46	4.37	4.35				4.46	AR
12	As Vazquez Collazo	Puerto Rico	3.96	4.10	3.92				4.10	SB
