= 2023 World Para Athletics Championships – Women's 100 metres =

The women's 100 metres at the 2023 World Para Athletics Championships were held across 14 classifications in the Charlety Stadium, Paris, France, from 9 to 17 July.

== Medalists ==
Event	Gold	Silver	Bronze
T11	Jerusa Geber; Brazil	Liu Cuiqing; China	Thalita Simplicio; Brazil
T12	Omara Durand; Cuba	Alejandra Paola Pérez López; Venezuela	Nagore Folgado García; Spain
T13	Lamiya Valiyeva; Azerbaijan	Adiaratou Iglesias Forneiro; Spain	Bianca Borgella; Canada
T34	Hannah Cockroft; Great Britain	Kare Adenegan; Great Britain	Fabienne André; Great Britain
T35	Zhou Xia; China	Guo Qianqian; China	Maria Lyle; Great Britain
T36	Shi Yiting; China	Danielle Aitchison; New Zealand	Nicole Nicoleitzik; Germany
T37	Karen Palomeque; Colombia	Jaleen Roberts; United States	Wen Xiaoyan; China
T38	Darian Faisury Jiménez; Colombia	Luca Ekler; Hungary	Sophie Hahn; Great Britain
T47	Kiara Rodriguez; Ecuador	Brittni Mason; United States	Anna Grimaldi; New Zealand
T53	Samantha Kinghorn; Great Britain	Catherine Debrunner; Switzerland	Gao Fang; China
T54	Amanda Kotaja; Finland	Noemi Alphonse; Mauritius	Tatyana McFadden; United States
T63	Ambra Sabatini; Italy	Martina Caironi; Italy	Monica Contrafatto; Italy
T64	Fleur Jong; Netherlands	Sara Andrés Barrio; Spain	Marissa Papaconstantinou; Canada
T72	Maria Strong; Australia	Magdalena Andruszkiewicz; Poland	Judith Tortosa Vila; Spain

== T11 ==
The event took place on 10 July.

Rank	Lane	Athlete	Nationality	Result	Notes
1st place, gold medalist(s)	5	Jerusa Geber; Guide:Gabriel Aparecido Dos Santos	Brazil	11.86	CR
2nd place, silver medalist(s)	1	Liu Cuiqing; Guide:Shengming Chen	China	12.30	
3rd place, bronze medalist(s)	7	Thalita Simplicio; Guide:Felipe Veloso	Brazil	12.37	
	3	Lorena Salvatini; Guide:Renato Ben Hur Costa	Brazil	DQ	

== T12 ==
This event took place on 15 July.

Rank	Lane	Athlete	Nation	Time	Notes
1st place, gold medalist(s)	3	Omara Durand; Yuniol Kindelan	Cuba	11.62	SB
2nd place, silver medalist(s)	5	Alejandra Perez; Markinzon Daniel Manzanilla	Venezuela	12.57	
3rd place, bronze medalist(s)	1	Nagore Folgado; Gil Javier Zaplana	Spain	12.66	PB
4	7	Melani Berges; Del Campo Sergio Diaz	Spain	12.70	

== T13 ==
The event took place on 10 July.

Rank	Lane	Name	Nationality	Time	Notes
1st place, gold medalist(s)	3	Lamiya Valiyeva	Azerbaijan	11.99	
2nd place, silver medalist(s)	4	Adiaratou Iglesias Forneiro	Spain	11.99	SB
3rd place, bronze medalist(s)	7	Bianca Borgella	Canada	12.16	
4	8	Orla Comerford	Ireland	12.22	
5	5	Rayane Soares	Brazil	12.70	
6	1	Erin Kerkhoff	United States	12.81	
7	2	Candela Cerrudo	Argentina	13.14	
8	6	Melissa Calvo	Costa Rica	14.12	

== T34 ==
The event took place on 13 July.

Rank	Lane	Name	Nationality	Class	Time	Notes
1st place, gold medalist(s)	4	Hannah Cockroft	Great Britain	T34	16.81	
2nd place, silver medalist(s)	6	Kare Adenegan	Great Britain	T34	17.82	
3rd place, bronze medalist(s)	1	Fabienne Andre	Great Britain	T34	19.14	
4	5	Eva Houston	United States	T34	19.28	PB
5	3	Moe Onodera	Japan	T34	19.41	
6	7	Joyce Lefevre	Belgium	T34	19.62	
7	8	Sarah Clifton-Bligh	Australia	T33	22.75	
8	2	Cecile Goens	Belgium	T33	23.21	

== T35 ==
This event took place on 17 July.

Rank	Lane	Athlete	Nationality	Class	Results	Notes
1st place, gold medalist(s)	3	Xia Zhou	China	T35	13.64	
2nd place, silver medalist(s)	6	Qianqian Guo	China	T35	14.01	PB
3rd place, bronze medalist(s)	4	Maria Lyle	Great Britain	T35	14.76	
4	5	Fatimah Suwaed	Iraq	T35	14.93	PB
5	1	Ingrid Renecka	Poland	T35	15.77	PB
6	8	Jagoda Kibil	Poland	T35	15.80	SB
7	2	Nienke Timmer	Netherlands	T35	15.85	
8	7	Isabelle Foerder	Germany	T35	15.99	

== T36 ==
The event took place on 12 July.

Rank	Lane	Name	Nationality	Time	Notes
1st place, gold medalist(s)	6	Shi Yiting	China	13.66	CR
2nd place, silver medalist(s)	4	Danielle Aitchison	New Zealand	13.84	
3rd place, bronze medalist(s)	8	Nicole Nicoleitzik	Germany	14.82	
4	3	Araceli Rotela	Argentina	15.02	
5	5	Yanina Martinez	Argentina	15.15	
6	7	Abby Craswell	Australia	15.15	
7	1	Mali Lovell	Australia	15.17	
8	2	Silva Samira Da	Brazil	15.18	

== T37 ==
The event took place on 13 July.

Rank	Lane	Name	Nationality	Time	Notes
1st place, gold medalist(s)	4	Karen Palomeque	Colombia	12.82	WR
2nd place, silver medalist(s)	5	Jaleen Roberts	United States	12.94	PB
3rd place, bronze medalist(s)	6	Wen Xiaoyan	China	13.03	SB
4	7	Sheryl James	South Africa	13.57	SB
5	8	Mandy Francois-Elie	France	13.68	
6	3	Jiang Fenfen	China	13.76	
7	1	Liezel Gouws	South Africa	14.59	SB
8	2	Anais Angeline	Mauritius	14.87	

== T38 ==
The event took place on 11 July.

Rank	Lane	Name	Nationality	Time	Notes
1st place, gold medalist(s)	3	Darian Faisury Jiménez	Colombia	12.50	SB
2nd place, silver medalist(s)	4	Luca Ekler	Hungary	12.54	PB
3rd place, bronze medalist(s)	6	Sophie Hahn	Great Britain	12.73	SB
4	5	Rhiannon Clarke	Australia	12.91	AR
5	7	Ella Pardy	Australia	13.10	
6	1	Olivia Breen	Great Britain	13.48	
7	2	Nele Moos	Germany	13.69	SB
	8	Ali Smith	Great Britain		DNS

== T47 ==
The event took place on 11 July.

Rank	Lane	Name	Nationality	Time	Notes
1st place, gold medalist(s)	3	Kiara Rodriguez	Ecuador	12.17	PB
2nd place, silver medalist(s)	4	Brittni Mason	United States	12.24	SB
3rd place, bronze medalist(s)	6	Anna Grimaldi	New Zealand	12.32	
4	5	Saška Sokolov	Serbia	12.35	
5	7	Sheriauna Haase	Canada	12.42	PB
6	2	Maria Clara Augusto	Brazil	12.59	PB
7	8	Li Lu	China	12.72	
8	1	Tereza Jakschová	Czech Republic	12.98	

== T53 ==
Rank	Lane	Name	Nationality	Class	Time
1st place, gold medalist(s)	3	Samantha Kinghorn	Great Britain	T53	15.93
2nd place, silver medalist(s)	6	Catherine Debrunner	Switzerland	T53	16.06
3rd place, bronze medalist(s)	4	Fang Gao	China	T53	16.23
4	5	Zhou Hongzhuan	China	T53	16.92
5	1	Jessica Lewis	Bermuda	T53	17.22
6	8	Hamide Dogangun	Turkey	T53	17.33
7	2	Nienke Timmer	Netherlands	T53	18.69

== T54 ==
This event took place on 14 July.

Rank	Lane	Athlete	Nationality	Class	Result	Notes
1st place, gold medalist(s)	5	Amanda Kotaja	Finland	T54	15.96	CR
2nd place, silver medalist(s)	3	Noemi Alphonse	Mauritius	T54	16.05	
3rd place, bronze medalist(s)	4	Tatyana Mcfadden	United States	T54	16.11	
4	6	Zhaoqian Zhou	China	T54	16.33	
5	8	Shuimei Luo	China	T54	16.53	
6	7	Hannah Dederick	United States	T54	16.54	SB
7	1	Momoka Muraoka	Japan	T54	16.84	
	2	Licia Mussinelli	Switzerland	T54	DNS	

== T63 ==
The event took place on 13 July.

Rank	Lane	Name	Nationality	Class	Time	Notes
1st place, gold medalist(s)	3	Ambra Sabatini	Italy	T63	13.98	WR
2nd place, silver medalist(s)	6	Martina Caironi	Italy	T63	14.35	SB
3rd place, bronze medalist(s)	4	Monica Graziana Contrafatto	Italy	T63	14.67	SB
4	5	Karisma Evi Tiarani	Indonesia	T42	14.76	SB
5	8	Elena Kratter	Switzerland	T63	15.21	SB
6	7	Alexandra Nouchet	France	T63	16.92	
7	2	Deliler Ann Selda	Norway	T63	17.78	

== T64 ==
The event took place on 13 July.

Rank	Lane	Name	Nationality	Time	Notes
1st place, gold medalist(s)	3	Fleur Jong	Netherlands	12.47	
2nd place, silver medalist(s)	6	Sara Andrés Barrio	Spain	12.83	
3rd place, bronze medalist(s)	4	Marissa Papaconstantinou	Canada	12.95	PB
4	3	Kiki Hendriks	Netherlands	12.99	
5	5	Kimberly Alkemade	Netherlands	13.02	
6	7	Irmgard Bensusan	Germany	13.12	
7	1	Beatriz Hatz	United States	13.13	SB
8	2	Giuliana Chiara Filippi	Italy	14.14	PB

== T72 ==
The event took place on 9 July.

Rank	Lane	Name	Nationality	Time	Notes
1st place, gold medalist(s)	5	Maria Strong	Australia	17.07	PB
2nd place, silver medalist(s)	4	Magdalena Andruszkiewicz	Poland	18.20	AR
3rd place, bronze medalist(s)	6	Judith Tortosa Vila	Spain	18.90	PB
4	3	Karla Risum	Denmark	19.23	PB
5	8	Thea Jørgensen	Denmark	19.30	
6	7	Zofia Kalucka	Poland	19.89	PB
7	1	Kristine Jacobsen	Denmark	20.71	
8	2	Sayers Grooms	United States	22.51	
