= 2024 World Para Athletics Championships – Women's 100 metres =

The women's 100 metres at the 2024 World Para Athletics Championships were held in Kobe.

== Medalists ==
Event	Gold	Silver	Bronze
T11	Jerusa Geber dos Santos; Brazil	Liu Cuiqing; China	Lorena Salvatini Spoladore; Brazil
T12	Darlenys de la Cruz Severino; Dominican Republic	Lorraine Gomes de Aguiar; Brazil	Ni Made Arianti Putri; Indonesia
T13	Lamiya Valiyeva; Azerbaijan	Rayane Soares da Silva; Brazil	Gloria Majaga; Botswana
T34	Hannah Cockroft; Great Britain	Lan Hanyu; China	Moe Onodera; Japan
T35	Zhou Xia; China	Guo Qianqian; China	Preethi Pal; India
T36	Shi Yiting; China	Danielle Aitchison; New Zealand	Verônica Hipólito; Brazil
T37	Wen Xiaoyan; China	Taylor Swanson; United States	Jiang Fenfen; China
T38	Luca Ekler; Hungary	Karen Palomeque; Colombia	Darian Faisury Jiménez; Colombia
T47	Kiara Rodriguez; Ecuador	Saška Sokolov; Serbia	Anna Grimaldi; New Zealand
T53	Zhou Hongzhuan; China	Gao Fang; China	Hamide Dogangun; Turkey
T54	Noemi Alphonse; Mauritius	Zhou Zhaoqian; China	Licia Mussinelli; Switzerland
T63	Karisma Evi Tiarani; Indonesia	Tomomi Tozawa; Japan	Kaede Maegawa; Japan
T64	Fleur Jong; Netherlands	Marlene van Gansewinkel; Netherlands	Sara Andrés Barrio; Spain
T72	Magdalena Andruszkiewicz; Poland	Judith Tortosa Vila; Spain	Sayers Grooms; United States

== T11 ==
The event took place on 21 May.

Rank	Lane	Athlete	Nationality	Result	Notes
1st place, gold medalist(s)	5	Jerusa Geber dos Santos; Guide:Gabriel Aparecido Dos Santos	Brazil	11.93	CR
2nd place, silver medalist(s)	3	Liu Cuiqing; Guide:Shengming Chen	China	12.00	SB
3rd place, bronze medalist(s)	1	Lorena Salvatini Spoladore; Guide:Renato Ben Hur Costa	Brazil	12.26	
4	7	Zhou Guohua; Guide:Jia Dengpu	China	12.30	SB

== T37 ==
The event took place on 21 May.

Rank	Lane	Name	Nationality	Time	Notes
1st place, gold medalist(s)	4	Wen Xiaoyan	China	12.27	WR
2nd place, silver medalist(s)	7	Taylor Swanson	United States	12.86	PB
3rd place, bronze medalist(s)	6	Jiang Fenfen	China	13.26	SB
4	5	Viktoriia Slanova	Neutral Paralympic Athletes (NPA)	13.48	PB
5	3	Sheryl James	South Africa	13.65	SB
6	2	Elena Tretiakova	Neutral Paralympic Athletes (NPA)	14.47	PB
7	8	Johanna Benson	Namibia	14.56	SB
8	9	Anais Angeline	Mauritius	14.80	
