= 2024 World Para Athletics Championships – Women's long jump =

The women's long jump events at the 2024 World Para Athletics Championships were held in Kobe.

== Medalists ==
Event	Gold	Silver	Bronze
T11	Asila Mirzayorova; Uzbekistan	Lorena Salvatini Spoladore; Brazil	Zhou Guohua; China
T12	Yokutkhon Kholbekova; Uzbekistan	Sara Martínez; Spain	Uran Sawada; Japan
T20	Zileide Cassiano da Silva; Brazil	Debora Oliveira de Lima; Brazil	Fatma Damla Altın; Turkey
T37	Wen Xiaoyan; China	Anais Angeline; Mauritius	Elena Tretiakova; Neutral Paralympic Athletes (NPA)
T38	Luca Ekler; Hungary	Margarita Goncharova; Neutral Paralympic Athletes (NPA)	Karen Palomeque; Colombia
T47	Kiara Rodriguez; Ecuador	Anna Grimaldi; New Zealand	Petra Luteran; Hungary
T63	Vanessa Low; Australia	Tomomi Tozawa; Japan	Kaede Maegawa; Japan
T64	Fleur Jong; Netherlands	Marlene van Gansewinkel; Netherlands	Maya Nakanishi; Japan
