= Anna Grimaldi =

New Zealand Paralympic athlete

Anna Grimaldi MNZM
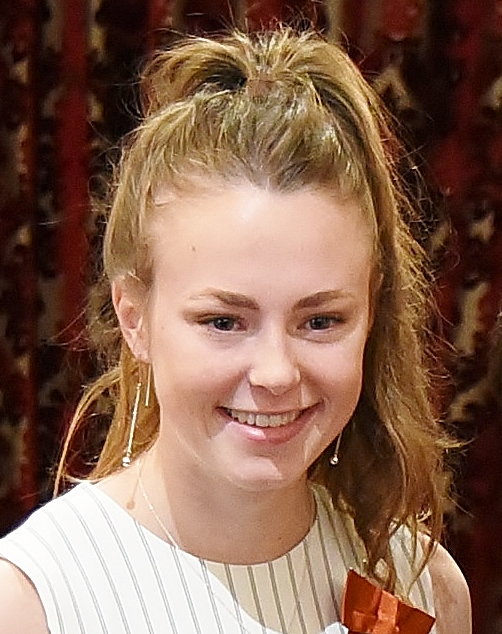
- Grimaldi in 2017

Personal information
- Born: 12 February 1997 (age 29) Dunedin, New Zealand

Sport
- Country: New Zealand
- Sport: Para athletics
- Disability class: T47, F46
- Events: Long jump; 100 metres; 200 metres
- Club: Hill City-University
Medal record
Women's para-athletics
Representing New Zealand
Paralympic Games
Gold medal – first place	2016 Rio de Janeiro	Long jump T47
Gold medal – first place	2020 Tokyo	Long jump T47
Gold medal – first place	2024 Paris	200 m T47
Bronze medal – third place	2024 Paris	100 m T47
World Championships
Silver medal – second place	2019 Dubai	Long jump T47
Silver medal – second place	2023 Paris	Long jump T47
Silver medal – second place	2024 Kobe	Long jump T47
Bronze medal – third place	2015 Doha	Long jump T47
Bronze medal – third place	2023 Paris	100 m T47
Bronze medal – third place	2024 Kobe	100 m T47
Bronze medal – third place	2025 New Delhi	200 m T47
Commonwealth Games
Bronze medal – third place	2026 Glasgow	100m T47

Anna Grimaldi MNZM (born 12 February 1997) is a New Zealand para-athlete, primarily competing in the long jump and sprint events. She has won two gold medals at Paralympics in the women's long jump: at the 2016 Summer Paralympics in Rio de Janeiro, and at the 2020 Summer Paralympics in Tokyo.

== Personal life ==
Grimaldi was born in Dunedin to Tony and Di Grimaldi, and has one sister, Abby. She was born with a withered right forearm and no functional right hand. She attended Bayfield High School in Dunedin; she played netball and basketball for the school and in her final year was a sports prefect. Grimaldi studied quantity surveying at Otago Polytechnic.

== Athletics career ==
Grimaldi started para-athletics after attending a Paralympic talent identification event in October 2013. She initially was reluctant to attend, having had no formal athletics training and fearing she would be "shocking". She is classified T47 for track events and long jump, and F46 for field events. She won her first international competition medal, the bronze in the women's long jump T47, at the 2015 IPC Athletics World Championships in Doha, Qatar. She set a personal best of 5.41 m, while her second-best 5.38 m secured her the bronze medal over Russian Alexandra Moguchaya on countback. Grimaldi also placed fifth in the women's 200 metres T47 final.

Her long jump distance at the 2015 World Championships ranked her in the top five in the long jump T47 during the Paralympics qualifying period, earning her a slot at the 2016 Summer Paralympics in Rio de Janeiro. She was officially confirmed to represent New Zealand at the Paralympics on 23 May 2016. At the Paralympics, she won the gold medal in the women's long jump T47 with a distance of 5.62 m, breaking her personal best by 21 cm. She also placed fourth in the women's 100 metres T47 final, and competed in the 200 metres T47 where she was disqualified in the heat for a lane infringement.

At the 2017 World Para Athletics Championships, Grimaldi ran the 200 m heats before pulling out of the 200 m final and 100 m due to a recurring foot injury in order to concentrate on the long jump. She placed fourth in the long jump, missing the medals by one centimetre.

Returning to New Zealand after the 2017 championships, Grimaldi's foot injury was discovered to be a stress fracture in her left navicular bone. She subsequently missed the entire 2018 season.

At the 2019 World Para Athletics Championships, Grimaldi placed second with a distance of 5.50 m, two centimetres behind Kiara Rodriguez of Ecuador.

At the 2021 Otago Athletics Championships Grimaldi set a personal best of 5.91 m, ten centimetres short of the T47 world record and placing her second in the overall (able-bodied and para) annual national rankings. At the delayed 2020 Summer Paralympics, Grimaldi won the gold medal in the women's long jump T47 with a distance of 5.76 m, setting a new Paralympic Games record.

At the 2024 Summer Paralympics in Paris, Grimadi finished fourth in the T47 women's long jump with 5.75m, 1cm behind the bronze medalist. She won the gold medal in the T47 women's 200m with a time of 24.72 second, for her third Paralympic gold medal and her first on the track. She also won a bronze medal in the T47 women's 100m in a time of 12.20 seconds, setting a new Oceania record.

== Awards ==
Grimaldi was appointed a Member of the New Zealand Order of Merit in the 2017 New Year Honours, for her services to athletics.

== Statistics ==
=== Personal bests ===
Event	Result (wind)	Date	Location	Notes
Long jump (T47)	5.91 (+1.8 m/s)	14 February 2021	Dunedin, New Zealand	NR
100 m (T47)	12.79 (+1.0 m/s)	6 April 2019	Sydney, Australia	NR
200 m (T47)	26.73 (+0.8 m/s)	27 October 2015	Doha, Qatar	NR
400 m (T47)	1:04.26	8 February 2015	Hamilton, New Zealand	NR

=== Long jump seasonal bests ===
Year	Performance	Competition	Location	Date	World ranking
2014	5.00 m	Weekly meeting	Dunedin, New Zealand	20 December	
2015	5.41 m	IPC Athletics World Championships	Doha, Qatar	23 October	
2016	5.62 m	Summer Paralympics	Rio de Janeiro, Brazil	8 September	
2017	5.58 m	New Zealand Championships	Hamilton, New Zealand	18 March	
2018					
2019	5.50 m	World Para Athletics Championships	Dubai, United Arab Emirates	9 November	
2020	5.72 m	Twilight meeting	Dunedin, New Zealand	22 October	
2020	5.77 m (w)	Interclub meeting	Dunedin, New Zealand	31 October	
2021	5.91 m	Otago Championships	Dunedin, New Zealand	14 February	

Source: Athletics New Zealand Records and Rankings

Awards
Preceded by Cameron Leslie	Halberg Awards; Para Athlete or Para Team of the Year; 2024	Succeeded by Danielle Aitchison
