= 2025 World Para Athletics Championships – Women's long jump =

The women's long jump events at the 2025 World Para Athletics Championships were held at the Jawaharlal Nehru Stadium, Delhi in New Delhi.

== Medalists ==
Event	Gold	Silver	Bronze
T11	Alba García Falagán; Spain	Tiffany Logette-Lods; France	Arjola Dedaj; Italy
T12	Yokutkhon Kholbekova; Uzbekistan	Iida Lounela; Finland	Lynda Hamri; Algeria
T20	Zileide Cassiano; Brazil	Fatma Damla Altın; Turkey	Karolina Kucharczyk; Poland
T37	Wen Xiaoyan; China	Anais Angeline; Mauritius	Jaleen Roberts; United States
T38	Luca Ekler; Hungary	Angie Mejía; Colombia	Karen Palomeque; Colombia
T47	Kiara Rodríguez; Colombia	Petra Luterán; Hungary	Bjørk Nørremark; Denmark
T63	Vanessa Low; Australia	Elena Kratter; Switzerland	Noelle Lambert-Beirne; United States
T64	Fleur Jong; Netherlands	Kiki Hendriks; Netherlands	Beatriz Hatz; United States

== T11 ==
Final

The event took place on 4 October.

Rank	Name	Nationality	Class	#1	#2	#3	#4	#5	#6	Result	Notes
1st place, gold medalist(s)	Alba García Falagán	Spain	T11	4.59	4.63	4.69	4.80	x	–	4.80	SB
2nd place, silver medalist(s)	Tiffany Logette-Lods	France	T11	4.56	3.99	4.41	4.37	4.48	4.42	4.56	
3rd place, bronze medalist(s)	Arjola Dedaj	Italy	T11	x	4.41	x	x	–	4.04	4.41	SB
4	Janjira Panyatib	Thailand	T11	4.20	3.81	4.06	4.16	x	3.99	4.20	SB
5	Irene Cerdá Nicolás	Spain	T11	3.92	3.94	4.17	4.15	3.35	4.13	4.17	
6	Shahrizoda Temirova	Uzbekistan	T11	4.13	4.08	3.81	3.98	x	x	4.13	PB
7	Gulnora Tuychieva	Uzbekistan	T11	x	4.11	4.01	x	x	x	4.11	PB

== T12 ==
Final

The event took place on 29 September.

Rank	Name	Nationality	Class	#1	#2	#3	#4	#5	#6	Result	Notes
1st place, gold medalist(s)	Yokutkhon Kholbekova	Uzbekistan	T12	5.54	–	5.52	5.48	5.25	5.31	5.54	SB
2nd place, silver medalist(s)	Iida Lounela	Finland	T12	5.25	5.28	5.12	5.16	5.26	5.14	5.28	
3rd place, bronze medalist(s)	Lynda Hamri	Algeria	T12	5.10	5.16	5.03	–	–	4.99	5.16	SB
4	Katrin Müller-Rottgardt	Germany	T12	5.09	4.93	5.08	5.00	5.07	5.06	5.09	
5	Antonella Inga	Italy	T12	4.81	4.72	4.77	4.70	4.78	4.53	4.81	PB
6	Dimitra Dialechti Messini	Greece	T12	4.48	4.36	4.49	4.58	4.59	4.54	4.59	
7	Delisa Filippov	Estonia	T12	3.79	3.68	3.76	3.82	3.64	3.71	3.82	PB

== T20 ==
Final

The event took place on 5 October.

Rank	Name	Nationality	Class	#1	#2	#3	#4	#5	#6	Result	Notes
1st place, gold medalist(s)	Zileide Cassiano	Brazil	T20	5.88	5.66	5.69	5.54	5.75	x	5.88	SB
2nd place, silver medalist(s)	Fatma Damla Altın	Turkey	T20	x	5.31	5.68	5.50	5.72	x	5.72	SB
3rd place, bronze medalist(s)	Karolina Kucharczyk	Poland	T20	5.49	5.40	5.44	5.43	5.55	5.52	5.55	SB
4	Mikela Ristoski	Croatia	T20	5.26	5.44	5.48	5.46	x	5.32	5.48	
5	Jardênia Félix	Brazil	T20	5.40	5.42	5.20	5.30	5.35	4.99	5.42	
6	Irina Sapanzha	Neutral Paralympic Athletes	T20	5.38	5.28	4.99	x	x	5.13	5.38	PB
7	Ana Filipe	Portugal	T20	5.33	x	5.19	x	5.26	x	5.33	SB
8	Im Yeong-ji	South Korea	T20	4.81	x	5.12	x	4.80	4.81	5.12	PB
9	Aleksandra Ruchkina	Neutral Paralympic Athletes	T20	x	5.11	x				5.11	SB
10	Telaya Blacksmith	Australia	T20	4.94	5.09	x				5.09	
11	Reyhan Taşdelen	Turkey	T20	x	x	5.05				5.05	
12	Tatiana Couto	Portugal	T20	5.01	4.78	4.96				5.01	
13	Stefanía Daney Guðmundsdóttir	Iceland	T20	x	4.93	4.80				4.93	
14	Florianne Lantoine	France	T20	4.48	x	x				4.48	
15	Valentina Stepanenkova	Neutral Paralympic Athletes	T20	x	x	4.08				4.08	
	Esra Bayrak	Turkey	T20	x	x	x				NM	

Qualification

The event took place on 4 October. Qualification: The 4 best performers (q) advance to the Final

Rank	Name	Nationality	Class	#1	#2	#3	Result	Notes
1	Valentina Stepanenkova	Neutral Paralympic Athletes	T20	3.94	5.12	3.18	5.12	q
2	Im Yeong-ji	South Korea	T20	5.11	x	4.91	5.11	q, PB
3	Tatiana Couto	Portugal	T20	5.01	5.04	4.86	5.04	q
4	Florianne Lantoine	France	T20	x	4.45	4.73	4.73	q
5	Ashley Telvave	Mauritius	T20	4.18	4.49	4.50	4.50	

== T37 ==
Final

The event took place on 27 September.

Rank	Name	Nationality	Class	#1	#2	#3	#4	#5	#6	Result	Notes
1st place, gold medalist(s)	Wen Xiaoyan	China	T37	5.00	5.10	x	x	5.32	–	5.32	CR
2nd place, silver medalist(s)	Anais Angeline	Mauritius	T37	3.68	4.58	4.56	4.41	4.59	4.55	4.59	AF
3rd place, bronze medalist(s)	Jaleen Roberts	United States	T37	4.33	4.48	4.24	4.53	4.11	4.12	4.53	
4	Elena Tretiakova	Neutral Paralympic Athletes	T37	4.44	4.17	x	4.45	x	4.27	4.45	SB
5	Liezel Gouws	South Africa	T37	x	x	4.18	x	4.25	x	4.25	SB
6	Laura Burbulla	Germany	T37	3.57	3.95	x	3.82	x	3.83	3.95	
7	Selma Van Kerm	Belgium	T37	3.75	3.67	3.70	x	3.83	3.65	3.83	
	Niamh MacAlasdair	Australia	T37	x	x	x	x	x	x	NM	

== T38 ==
Final

The event took place on 1 October.

Rank	Name	Nationality	Class	#1	#2	#3	#4	#5	#6	Result	Notes
1st place, gold medalist(s)	Luca Ekler	Hungary	T38	x	5.86	x	x	5.91	5.73	5.91	WR
2nd place, silver medalist(s)	Angie Mejía	Colombia	T38	4.95	5.09	5.42	x	x	5.38	5.42	AM
3rd place, bronze medalist(s)	Karen Palomeque	Colombia	T38	5.19	5.25	5.24	5.22	5.13	5.02	5.25	PB
4	Olivia Breen	Great Britain	T38	5.17	5.08	x	x	5.05	4.79	5.17	PB
5	Maddie Down	Great Britain	T38	x	4.68	5.04	x	4.43	x	5.04	PB
6	Ilgın Meryem Metin	Turkey	T38	4.43	4.41	4.82	x	x	4.76	4.82	PB
7	Chen Zimo	China	T38	4.53	x	4.17	4.64	3.82	x	4.64	SB
8	Friederike Brose	Germany	T38	x	x	x	4.25	4.21	4.26	4.26	

== T47 ==
Final

The event took place on 4 October.

Rank	Name	Nationality	Class	#1	#2	#3	#4	#5	#6	Result	Notes
1st place, gold medalist(s)	Kiara Rodríguez	Ecuador	T46	6.29	x	–	–	–	–	6.29	CR
2nd place, silver medalist(s)	Petra Luterán	Hungary	T47	5.59	5.73	5.64	5.71	5.98	x	5.98	ER
3rd place, bronze medalist(s)	Bjørk Nørremark	Denmark	T47	x	5.70	5.63	5.60	5.84	5.67	5.84	
4	Nimisha Chakkungalparambil	India	T46	5.58	5.63	5.74	5.10	5.45	5.45	5.74	AS
5	Paola del Valle Garcia Ramos	Venezuela	T46	x	5.69	x	5.46	x	5.47	5.69	PB
6	Marie N'Goussou	France	T46	5.32	5.26	5.23	5.36	4.45	5.29	5.36	
7	Janani Wickramasingha	Sri Lanka	T47	x	x	5.36	5.15	4.72	5.29	5.36	PB
8	Felipa Hechavarria	Cuba	T46	4.97	x	x	x	x	5.25	5.25	
9	Styliani Smaragdi	Greece	T47	4.93	x	4.90				4.93	
10	Anora Sufiyeva	Uzbekistan	T47	4.80	4.63	4.69				4.80	PB
11	Yan Jing	China	T46	4.44	4.48	4.61				4.61	
12	Prabha Angdembe	Nepal	T47	x	x	x				NM	

== T63 ==
Final

The event took place on 30 September.

Rank	Name	Nationality	Class	#1	#2	#3	#4	#5	#6	Result	Notes
1st place, gold medalist(s)	Vanessa Low	Australia	T61	4.98	5.49	x	x	x	5.47	5.49	CR
2nd place, silver medalist(s)	Elena Kratter	Switzerland	T63	x	5.16	x	5.23	5.33	5.45	5.45	CR
3rd place, bronze medalist(s)	Noelle Lambert	United States	T63	4.55	4.50	4.84	x	4.79	x	4.84	
4	Emilie Aaen	Denmark	T63	4.42	–	4.72	4.77	4.73	x	4.77	PB
5	Tomomi Tozawa	Japan	T63	x	4.40	4.52	x	4.77	x	4.77	
6	Desirée Vila Bargiela	Spain	T63	4.40	x	x	x	4.37	4.56	4.56	PB
7	Kaede Maegawa	Japan	T63	x	x	3.99	x	x	4.35	4.35	
8	Lindi Marcusen	United States	T63	3.89	x	x	x	x	–	3.89	
	Ambra Sabatini	Italy	T63	x	x	x				NM	

== T64 ==
Final

The event took place on 3 October.

Rank	Name	Nationality	Class	#1	#2	#3	#4	#5	#6	Result	Notes
1st place, gold medalist(s)	Fleur Jong	Netherlands	T62	6.73	6.81	6.57	x	x	x	6.81	CR
2nd place, silver medalist(s)	Kiki Hendriks	Netherlands	T62	x	5.28	5.38	5.43	5.40	5.43	5.43	SB
3rd place, bronze medalist(s)	Beatriz Hatz	United States	T64	5.24	5.38	5.30	5.04	5.31	5.35	5.38	
4	Annie Carey	United States	T44	4.92	5.00	5.19	4.96	5.08	5.20	5.20	WR
5	Sarah Walsh	Australia	T64	4.80	4.80	4.74	4.89	4.85	5.14	5.14	SB
6	Giuliana Chiara Filippi	Italy	T64	4.35	x	x	x	5.07	x	5.07	
7	Maya Nakanishi	Japan	T64	x	x	4.97	x	4.73	x	4.97	SB
8	Patricia Walsh	New Zealand	T64	4.43	4.52	4.67	4.61	4.89	4.71	4.89	PB
9	Amaris Sofia Vazquez Collazo	Puerto Rico	T64	x	4.10	4.28				4.28	
10	Makayla Elcoate	Australia	T44	4.02	4.04	x				4.04	
