= Angie Mejía =

Colombian para athlete (born 2009)

Personal information
- Full name: Angie Nicoll Mejia Morales
- Born: 25 January 2009 (age 17)

Sport
- Country: Colombia
- Sport: Para-athletics
- Disability class: T38
Medal record
Women's para-athletics
Representing Colombia
World Championships
Gold medal – first place	2025 New Delhi	100 m T38
Silver medal – second place	2025 New Delhi	200 m T38
Silver medal – second place	2025 New Delhi	Long jump T38

Angie Nicoll Mejia Morales (born 25 January 2009) is a Colombian para athlete who competes in T38 sprint events.

== Career ==
Mejía competed at the 2025 World Para Athletics Championships and won a gold medal in the 100 metres T38 event with a championship record time of 12.34. She defeated Paralympic champion and world record-holder Karen Palomeque by two hundredths of a second. She also competed in the long jump T38 event and won a silver medal.
