= Fleur Jong =

Dutch Paralympic athlete (born 1995)

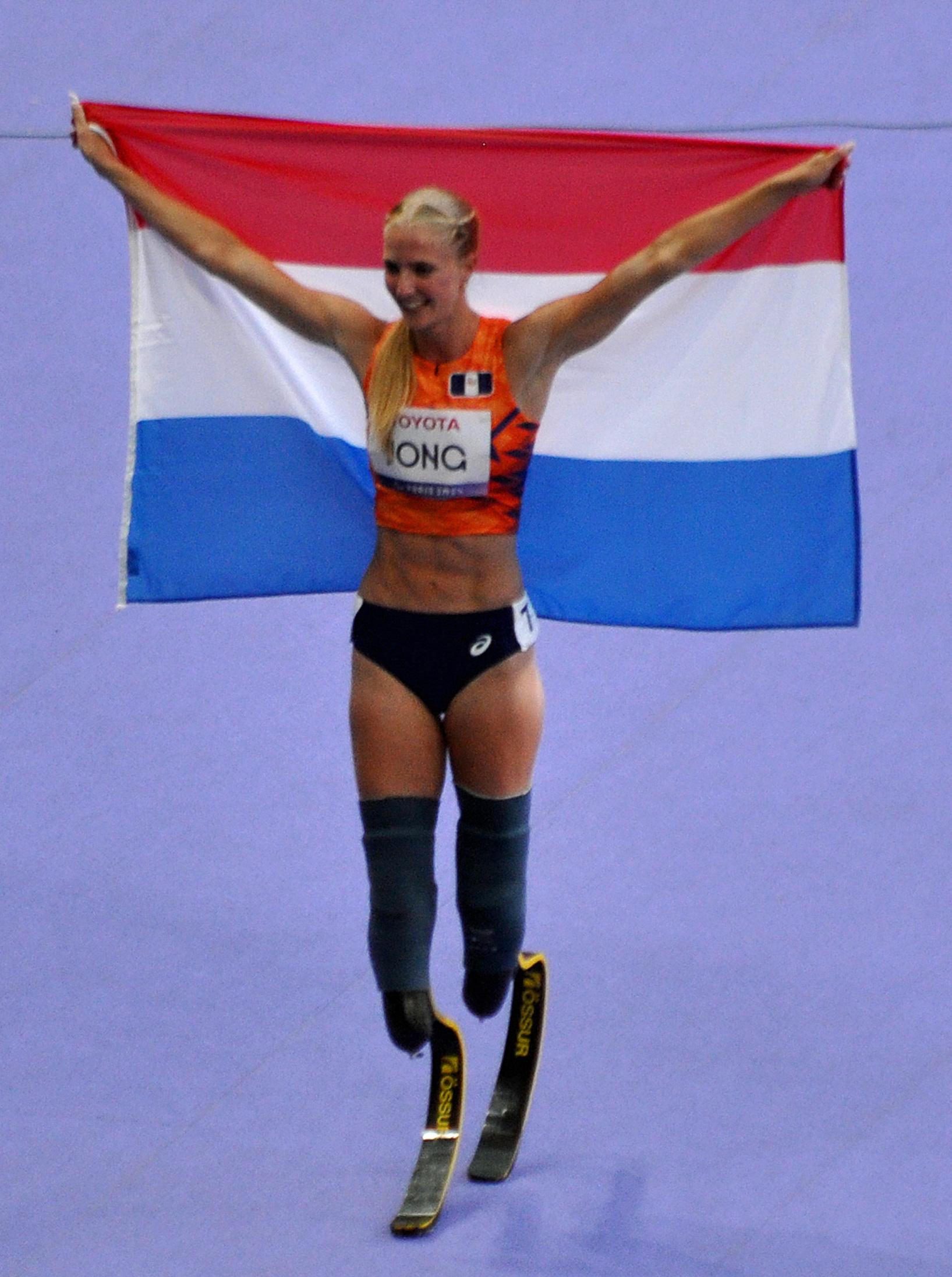
- Jong at the 2024 Summer Paralympics

Personal information
- Born: 17 December 1995 (age 30) Purmerend, Netherlands

Sport
- Country: Netherlands
- Sport: Para-athletics
- Disability: Amputated limbs after bacterial blood infection
- Disability class: T62 (2018 – present); T43 (until 2018)
- Events: Long jump; 100 metres; 200 metres
- Coached by: Guido Bonsen

Achievements and titles
- Personal bests: 100 metres: 12.02 s (August 2025); Long jump: 6.86 m (June 2025)
Medal record
Women's para-athletics
Representing Netherlands
Paralympic Games
| Gold medal – first place | 2020 Tokyo | Long jump T64 |
| Gold medal – first place | 2024 Paris | Long jump T64 |
| Gold medal – first place | 2024 Paris | 100 m T64 |
World Championships
| Gold medal – first place | 2023 Paris | Long jump T64 |
| Gold medal – first place | 2023 Paris | 100 m T64 |
| Gold medal – first place | 2024 Kobe | Long jump T64 |
| Gold medal – first place | 2024 Kobe | 100 m T64 |
| Gold medal – first place | 2025 New Delhi | Long jump T64 |
| Gold medal – first place | 2025 New Delhi | 100 m T64 |
| Gold medal – first place | 2025 New Delhi | Universal 4 × 100 m relay |
| Bronze medal – third place | 2015 Doha | 200 m T44 |
European Championships
| Gold medal – first place | 2021 Bydgoszcz | 100 m T64 |
| Gold medal – first place | 2021 Bydgoszcz | Long jump T64 |

Fleur Jong (Dutch: [fløːr ˈjɔŋ]; born 17 December 1995) is a Dutch Paralympic athlete. She won the gold medal in the women's long jump T64 event at the 2020 Summer Paralympics in Tokyo, Japan and the 2024 Summer Paralympics in Paris, France. As of June 2025, her world record in this event is 6.86 metres.

Jong is a gold medalist in the women's 100 metres T64 and women's long jump T64 events at the World Para Athletics Championships and the World Para Athletics European Championships. She won the gold medal in both her events at the 2023 World Para Athletics Championships held in Paris, France and in both events at the 2021 World Para Athletics European Championships held in Bydgoszcz, Poland.

== Early life ==
A few days before her 17th birthday, in December 2012, Jong contracted a bacterial blood infection which hindered blood flow to her extremities. As a result, her right leg had to be amputated below the knee as well as part of her left foot and the top halves of eight fingers. Dutch para snowboarder Bibian Mentel coached her during her rehabilitation. The following year, Jong also had her left leg amputated below the knee, at her request, as she was unable to use it properly.

In 2013, Jong attended a talent day for Paralympic sports organised by NOC*NSF where she met Guido Bonsen who later became her coach.

== Career ==
Early in her career, Jong competed as a T43-classified athlete. She won the bronze medal in the women's 200 metres T44 event at the 2015 IPC Athletics World Championships held in Doha, Qatar. She also finished in 6th place in the women's 100 metres T44 event. Jong represented the Netherlands in two events at the 2016 Summer Paralympics in Rio de Janeiro, Brazil. In both the women's 100 metres T44 and women's 200 metres T44 she did not advance to compete in the final. In 2017, Jong finished in 4th place in the women's 200 metres T44 event at the World Para Athletics Championships held in London, United Kingdom.

At the beginning of 2018, World Para Athletics implemented classification changes and, as of that year, Jong competes as a T62-classified athlete, a class specifically for athletes with double below the knee amputation. In 2019, Jong finished in 4th place in the women's long jump T64 event at the World Para Athletics Championships held in Dubai, United Arab Emirates. She also finished in 7th place in the women's 100 metres T64 event.

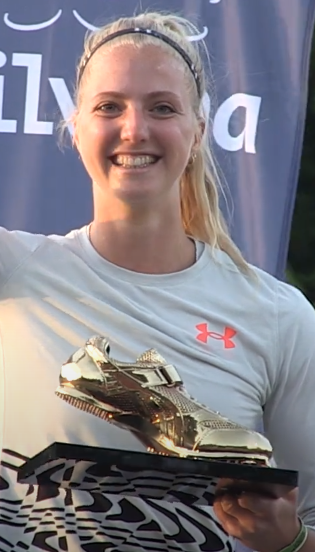
Jong with the Gouden Spike award (June 2021)

In May 2021, Jong became the first female T62-classified athlete to jump more than six metres in the long jump event. She set a new record of 6.02 metres at the 2021 World Para Athletics Grand Prix event held in Nottwil, Switzerland. In June 2021, she won two gold medals by setting a new world record in both the women's 100 metres T64 and women's long jump T64 events at the World Para Athletics European Championships held in Bydgoszcz, Poland. In the long jump event, Jong set a new world record twice: in her fifth attempt, she jumped 6.04 metres and she improved this to 6.06 metres in her next attempt. A week later, she improved her world record again to 6.09 metres at the annual Gouden Spike competition held in Leiden, Netherlands. She also won the 50th Gouden Spike award for her achievement.

Jong represented the Netherlands at the 2020 Summer Paralympics in Tokyo, Japan. She won the gold medal in the women's long jump T64 event with a new world record of 6.16 metres. She finished in 4th place in the women's 100 metres T64 event. In the final, she set a new T62 Paralympic record of 13.10 seconds. Jong was also one of the flag bearers for the Netherlands during the opening ceremony of the 2020 Summer Paralympics.

In February 2022, Jong competed at the Dutch Indoor Athletics Championships among able-bodied athletes but without competing for a medal. In March, her portrait was added to a mural in the Schilderswijk neighbourhood of The Hague, Netherlands, alongside other Dutch competitors of the Summer or Winter Olympics and Paralympics held in 2021 and 2022. In May, she set a new world record of 6.23 metres in the women's long jump T62/F62 event at the L’Hospitalet International Meeting held in L'Hospitalet de Llobregat near Barcelona, Spain.

In June 2022, Jong competed among able-bodied athletes at the 2022 FBK Games held in Hengelo, Netherlands. A few days later, she set a new T62 world record in the women's 100 metres T44/62/63/64 event at the World Para Athletics Grand Prix held in Paris, France. In July, Jong became the first woman with prosthetic legs to set a time of less than 12.50 seconds (T62 class) in the 100 metres event. She set the record of 12.46 seconds at a competition held in Leverkusen, Germany.

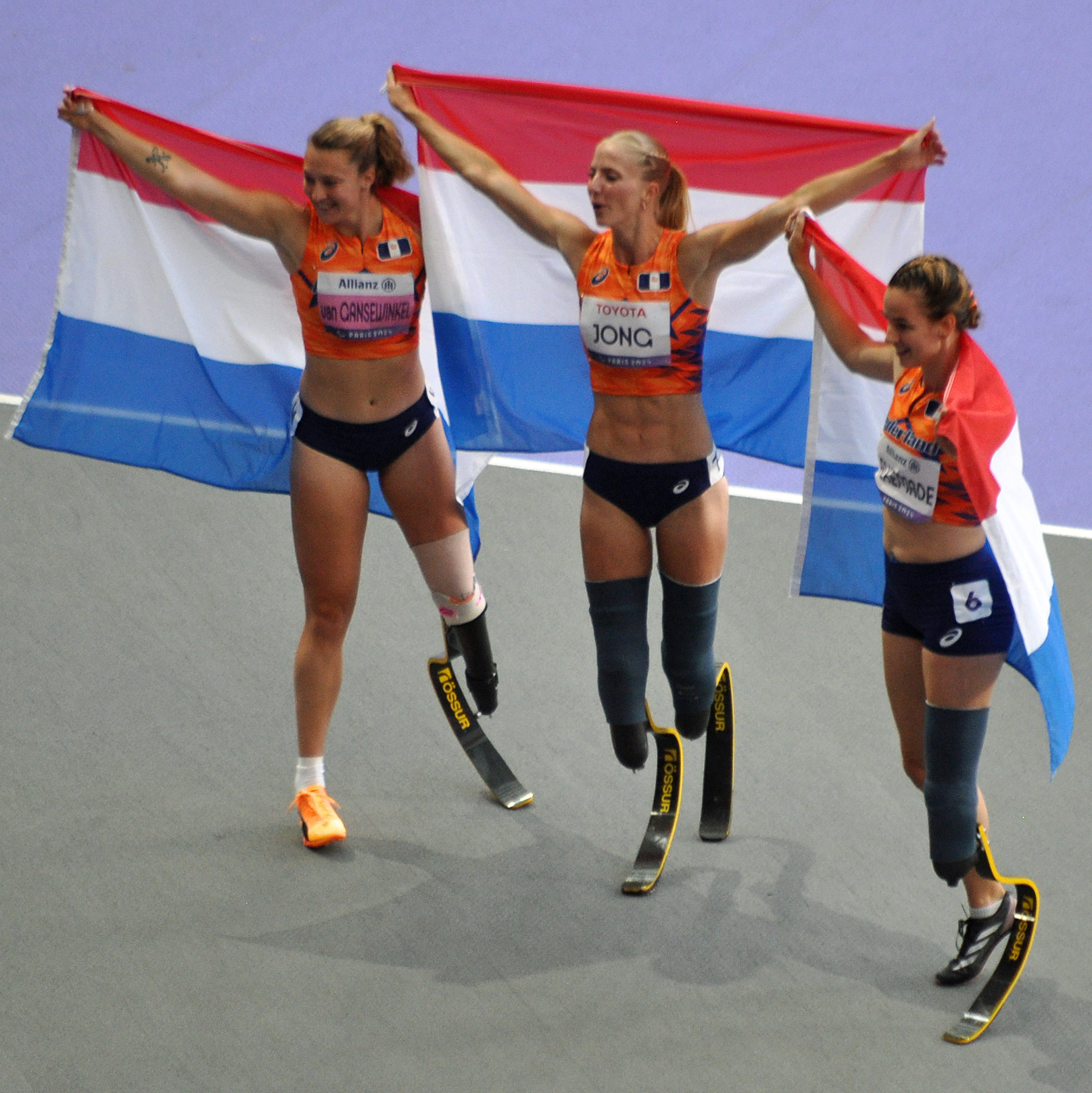
Medal winners at the T64 100m in the 2024 Paralympics

In May 2023, at the World Para Athletics Grand Prix event held in Nottwil, Switzerland, Jong set a new world record in the women's 100 metres T62 event with a time of 12.40 seconds. In June 2023, at the Open Nederlands Kampioenschap Para Atletiek held in Vught, Netherlands, she set a new world record in the long jump with a jump of 6.48 metres. A month later, Jong won the gold medal in the women's long jump T64 event at the 2023 World Para Athletics Championships held in Paris, France. She also won the gold medal in the women's 100 metres T64 event. In September 2023, she set a new world record 6.74 metres in her long jump event.

In May 2024, Jong won two gold medals at the World Para Athletics Championships held in Kobe, Japan: she won gold in the women's 100 metres T64 event and in the women's long jump T64 event. A few months later, Jong won the gold medal in the women's long jump T64 event at the 2024 Summer Paralympics in Paris, France. She set a new T62 Paralympic record of 6.53 metres. Jong also won the gold medal in the women's 100 metres T64 event. Jong set a new Paralympic record of 12.48 seconds in her heat. The event was a podium sweep for the Netherlands, with Kimberly Alkemade and Marlene van Gansewinkel winning the silver and bronze medal respectively.

Jong won the 'Para sportswoman of the year' award at the 2024 NOC*NSF Sportgala.

== Personal life ==
Jong studies communication sciences at the University of Amsterdam.

In 2017, she founded Team Para Atletiek together with Paralympic athlete Marlene van Gansewinkel and coach Guido Bonsen which aims to help beginning and experienced para-athletes.

== Achievements ==
=== Track ===
| Year | Competition | Venue | Position | Event | Notes |
|---|---|---|---|---|---|
| 2015 | World Championships | Doha, Qatar | 3rd | 200 m | 27.30 s |
| 2021 | European Championships | Bydgoszcz, Poland | 1st | 100 m | 12.64 s |
| 2023 | World Championships | Paris, France | 1st | 100 m | 12.47 s |
| 2024 | World Championships | Kobe, Japan | 1st | 100 m | 12.71 s |
| 2024 | Summer Paralympics | Paris, France | 1st | 100 m | 12.54 s |

=== Field ===
| Year | Competition | Venue | Position | Event | Notes |
|---|---|---|---|---|---|
| 2021 | European Championships | Bydgoszcz, Poland | 1st | Long jump | 6.06 m |
| 2021 | Summer Paralympics | Tokyo, Japan | 1st | Long jump | 6.16 m |
| 2023 | World Championships | Paris, France | 1st | Long jump | 6.28 m |
| 2024 | World Championships | Kobe, Japan | 1st | Long jump | 6.53 m |
| 2024 | Summer Paralympics | Paris, France | 1st | Long jump | 6.53 m |
