= Vanessa Low =

Australian Paralympic athlete (born 1990)

Vanessa Low OAM
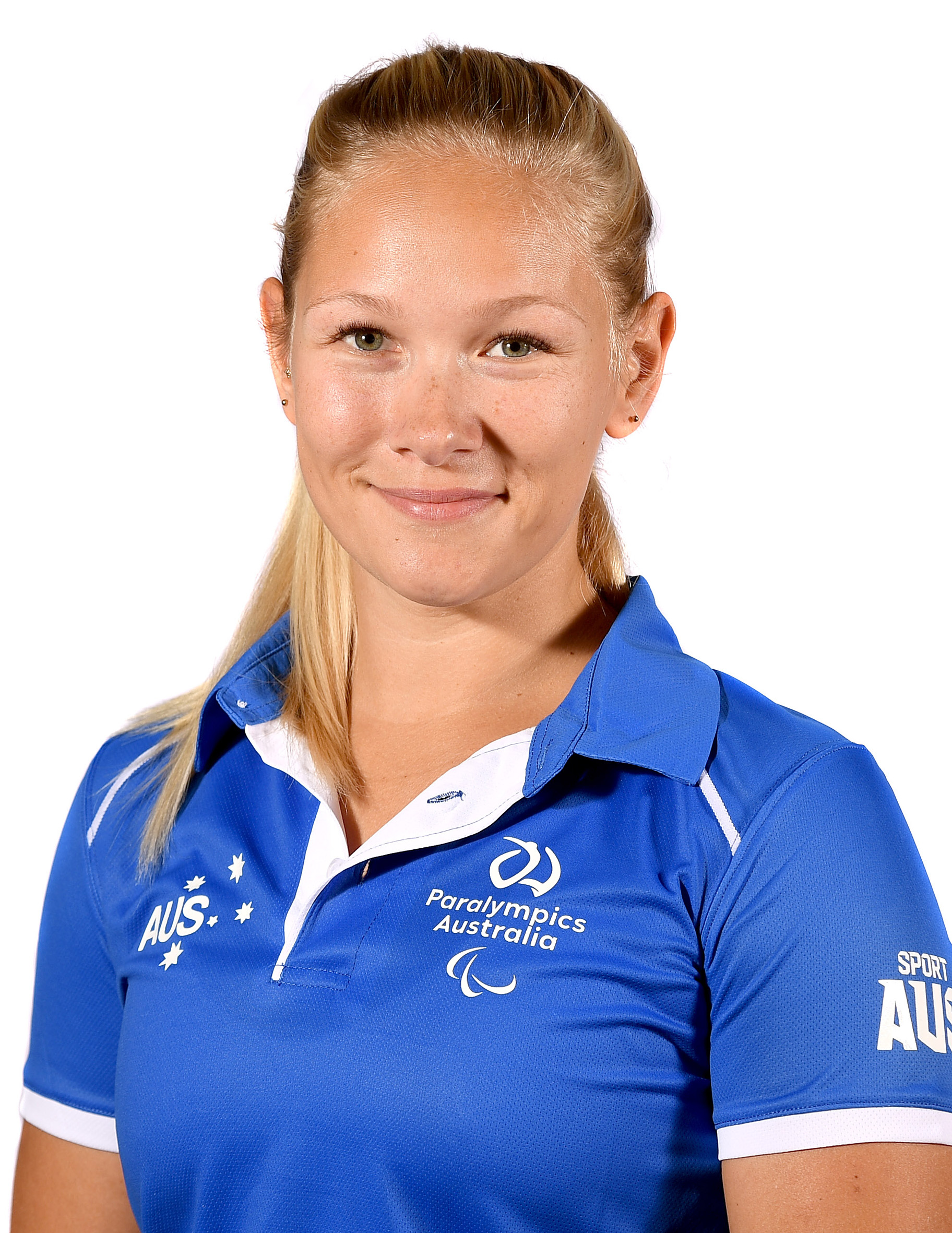
- Vanessa Low in 2019

Personal information
- Born: 17 July 1990 (age 36) Schwerin, East Germany

Sport
- Country: Germany (2009–2017); Australia (2017–present)
- Sport: Paralympic athletics
- Coached by: Scott Reardon

Achievements and titles
- Paralympic finals: 2012, 2016, 2020
Medal record
Women's para athletics
Representing Australia
Paralympic Games
Gold medal – first place	2020 Tokyo	Long jump – T63
Gold medal – first place	2024 Paris	Long jump – T63
World Championships
Gold medal – first place	2019 Dubai	Long jump – T61-63
Gold medal – first place	2024 Kobe	Long jump – T63
Gold medal – first place	2025 New Delhi	Long jump – T63
Bronze medal – third place	2023 Paris	Long jump – T63
Representing Germany
Paralympic Games
Gold medal – first place	2016 Rio de Janeiro	Long jump – T42
Silver medal – second place	2016 Rio de Janeiro	100m – T42
World Championships
Gold medal – first place	2015 Doha	Long jump – T42
Silver medal – second place	2015 Doha	100m – T42
Bronze medal – third place	2011 Christchurch	100m – T42
Bronze medal – third place	2013 Lyon	Long jump – T42
Bronze medal – third place	2013 Lyon	100m – T42
European Championships
Gold medal – first place	2014 Swansea	Long jump – T42
Gold medal – first place	2016 Grosseto	Long jump – T42-44
Silver medal – second place	2014 Swansea	100m – T42
Silver medal – second place	2016 Grosseto	100m – T42

Vanessa Low OAM (born 17 July 1990) is a German-born Australian Paralympic athlete competing in T42 sprint and long jump events. Born in East Germany, she gained Australian nationality in June 2017.

In 2016, Low was the only actively competing female track athlete with two above-knee amputations of her legs. Despite the location of these amputations and despite her having to compete with athletes having one fully functional leg, she successfully made it to the finals of all of her sprint and long jump competitions at both the 2012 Summer Paralympics in London and the 2016 Summer Paralympics in Rio. In Rio she won the gold medal with a 4.93m world record distance in the T42 long jump and a silver medal in the T42 100m competition. This was repeated in the 2020 Summer Paralympics in Tokyo with the T63 long jump gold medal and world record even though she was classified T61.

== Personal history ==
Low was born on 17 July 1990 in Schwerin, East Germany, and grew up in Ratzeburg. In June 2006, at the age of 15, she was struck by a train at a railway platform after losing her balance. The accident severed her left leg and left her in a coma for two weeks. During life-saving surgery her doctors were forced to amputate her other leg. It took Low two years to relearn to walk using her prostheses.

Low is married to Australian Paralympic gold medallist Scott Reardon. Low and Reardon have a son Matteo who was born in 2022.

== Sporting career ==
Low enjoyed sports before her accident, and wished to continue playing after. She also stated that she was inspired by American disabled long jumper Cameron Clapp. She took up athletics in 2008 and made her senior sports debut the same year, but broke her elbow in 2009, putting her out of competition for three months. Two years later she was selected for the German national team, travelling to Christchurch in New Zealand to compete at the 2011 IPC Athletics World Championships. There she finished fourth in the long jump and won bronze in the T42 100m sprint.

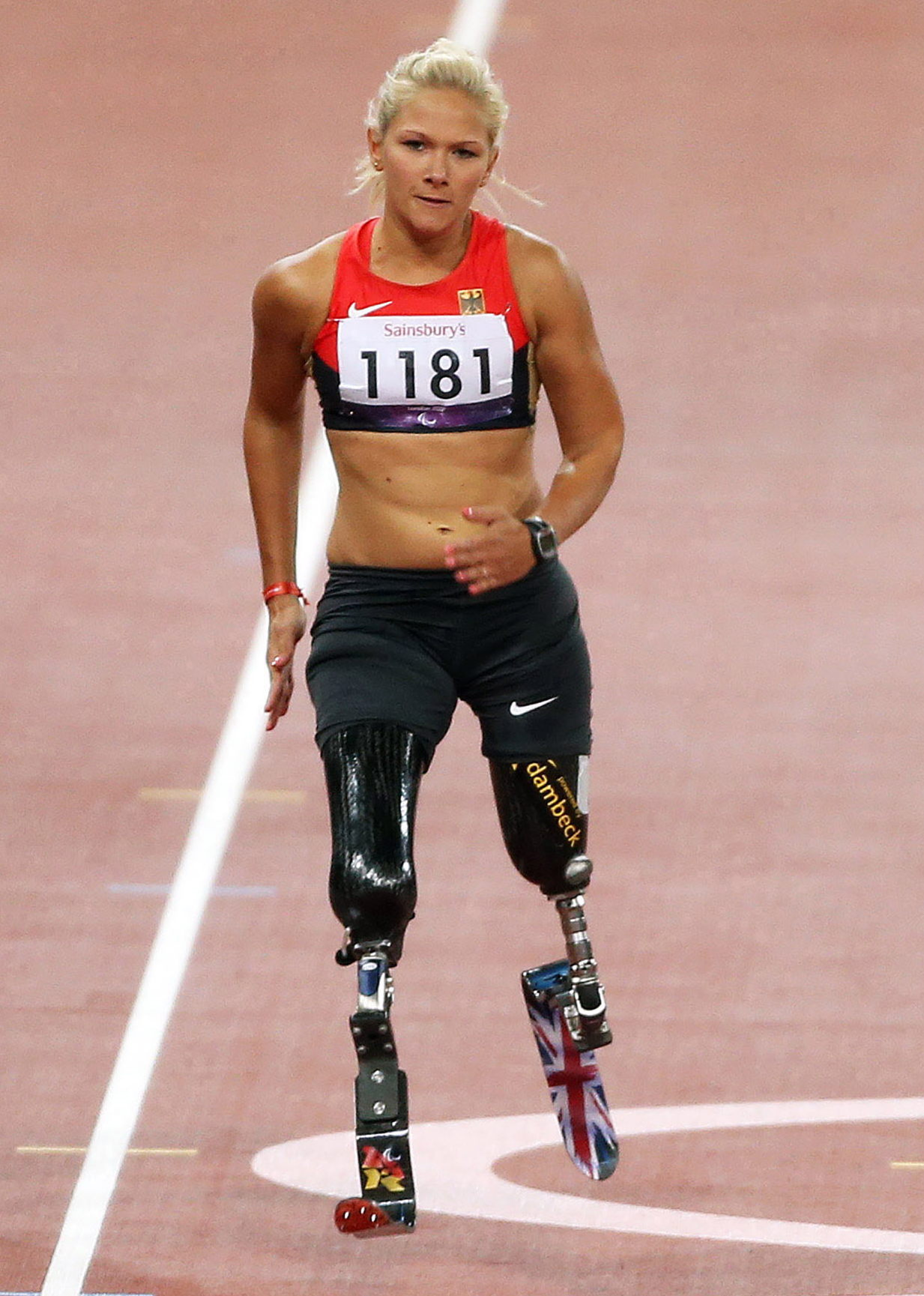
Vanessa Low in the 100m T42 final, London Paralympics

In 2012 Low qualified for both the 100m sprint and long jump events for the Summer Paralympics in London. The long jump was open across three classifications, F42 to F44, and was decided on a points system. Her best result of 3.93m saw her finish in sixth place. In the sprint she recorded a time of 16.78, which left her just outside the medal positions, finishing fourth behind team-mate Jana Schmidt. Low was disappointed with her performance at the Games and her training in general leading up to the Paralympics. She consulted her trainer, Steffi Nerius, and decided to retire from competitive sport.

In 2013, Low visited her friend and fellow German athlete Katrin Green, who was living in the United States and was married to American athlete Roderick Green. While training with the Greens, Low found her passion for athletics rekindled and decided to move to the States, and took Roderick on as her new trainer. By the end of the year she was back representing Germany, this time at the 2013 World Championships in Lyon. There she won two bronze medals, in the 100m sprint and the long jump. The following year saw a major breakthrough in her long jump, when she competed at the 2014 IPC Athletics European Championships in Swansea. Her distance of 4.24m was a big improvement on her previous major competitions, where she had not jumped over four metres. The result saw her win gold, and more importantly, beat her two major world rivals: Schmidt and Italy's Martina Caironi.

In the build up to the 2016 Summer Paralympics in Rio, Low competed at the 2015 World Championships in Doha. In the 100m sprint she posted a personal best of 15.41s to win the silver medal, but it was her world record distance of 4.79m in the long jump that not only gave her the gold but also set her out as the athlete to beat at Rio.

At the 2016 Summer Paralympics in Rio de Janeiro, Low won the gold medal with a 4.93m world record distance in the T42 long jump and a silver medal in the T42 100m competition with a personal best of 15.17s.

At the 2019 World Para Athletics Championships in Dubai, she won the gold medal in the Women's Long Jump T61-63 with jump of 4.68m. It was her first major international medal representing Australia.

Low competed for Australia at the 2020 Summer Paralympics in Tokyo. She won the women's T63 long jump gold medal, surpassing the previous world record three times in wet conditions, her final jump being 5.28m.

She won the bronze medal in the Women's Long Jump T63 at the 2023 World Para Athletics Championships in Paris. Competing as T61 athlete, she jumped 4.90m (+1.8) in the sixth round to miss out on silver by one centimetre. It was her first major competition after the birth of her son Matteo.

At the 2024 World Para Athletics Championships in Kobe, Japan, Low won the gold medal in the Women's Long Jump T63. Her jump of 5.29m (-0.1) setting a new championship record and narrowly missed her own world record of 5.33m.

At the 2024 Paris Paralympics, she won the gold medal in the Women's Long Jump T63 with a world record of 5.45 (-0.3). In 2025, she broke her own world record in the long jump, leaping 5.71m at the Australian Athletics Championships in Perth.

At the 2025 World Para Athletics Championships in New Delhi, she won the gold medal in the Women's Long Jump T63 in 5.49m (+0.5). It was her third world championships gold medal.

"Paralympic sport is a little bit of a reminder that we sometimes need to focus more on what we have, rather than what we are lacking, or we feel like we are lacking. I really hope that people understand that you don't have to achieve something amazing in order to be perfect the way that you are.

I really love to encourage people to understand that we aren't our disabilities, but what really defines us is the choices we make, the challenges we take, the way that we put ourselves out there and bring whatever abilities that we have individually to the table. Society gets better because of how different we are."

— Vanessa Low, Canberra Times, https://www.canberratimes.com.au/story/7415948/focus-more-on-what-we-have-rather-than-what-we-are-lacking-canberra-paralympic-medallist/

Low is coached by Scott Reardon after being coached by Iryna Dvorskina.

== Recognition ==
- 2020 – Athletics Australia 2019 Female Para-athlete of the Year.
- 2020 - Canberra Sport Awards - Para athlete of the Year
- 2022 – Medal of the Order of Australia for service to sport as a gold medallist at the Tokyo Paralympic Games 2020
- 2022 - Athletics Australia Amy Winters Award for Female Para Athlete of the Year
- 2024 - Athletics Australia Amy Winters Award for Female Para Athlete of the Year
- 2025 - Athletics Australia Amy Winters Award for Female Para Athlete of the Year
