= Athletics at the 2024 Summer Paralympics – Women's 400 metres T38 =

Women's 400 metres T38 at the XVII Paralympic Games
- Venue: Stade de France
- Dates: 6 September 2024 (round 1); 7 September 2024 (final)
- Competitors: 13 from 11 nations
- Winning time: 58.67 WR

Medalists
1st place, gold medalist(s)		Karen Palomeque	Colombia
2nd place, silver medalist(s)		Luca Ekler	Hungary
3rd place, bronze medalist(s)		Lindy Ave	Germany

400 metres at the 2024 Summer Paralympics
Men · T11 · T12 · T13 · T20 · T36 · T37 · T38 · T47 · T52 · T53 · T54 · T62
Women · T11 · T12 · T13 · T20 · T37 · T38 · T47 · T53 · T54 ·

The women's 400 metres T38 event at the 2024 Summer Paralympics in Paris, took place on 6 and 7 September 2024.

The T38 category is for ambulant athletes with cerebral palsy. T38 athletes have the mildest form of impairment caused by cerebral palsy, often in only one limb, and not affecting the ability to run, walk or jump freely, although impairing performance. T38 athletes may suffer minor co-ordination difficulties.

== Records ==
Prior to the competition, the existing records were as follows:

World Record	Karen Palomeque (COL)	59.40	(Japan) Kobe	25 May 2024
Paralympic Record	Lindy Ave (GER)	1:00.00	(Japan) Tokyo	4 September 2021

Area	Time	Athlete	Location	Date
Africa	1:03.96	(Tunisia) Sonia Mansour	(United Arab Emirates) Dubai	11 November 2019
America	59.40	(Colombia) Karen Palomeque	(Japan) Kobe	25 May 2024
Asia	1:01.34	(China) Chen Junfei	(Brazil) Rio de Janeiro	14 September 2016
Europe	59.74	(Hungary) Luca Ekler	(France) Paris	17 July 2023
Oceania	1:15.66	Record mark		

== Results ==
=== Round 1 ===
First 3 in each heat (Q) and the next 2 fastest (q) advance to the Final.

==== Heat 1 ====
Rank	Lane	Athlete	Nation	Time	Notes
1	6	Karen Palomeque	Colombia	59.88	Q, PR
2	8	Margarita Goncharova	Neutral Paralympic Athletes	1:00.82	Q
3	5	Ali Smith	Great Britain	1:01.06	Q, PB
4	4	Nele Moos	Germany	1:01.56	q
5	7	Sofia Pace	France	1:02.37	q, PB
6	3	Catarina Guimares	United States	1:09.63	
—	9	Vilma Berg	Finland	DNS	

==== Heat 2 ====
Rank	Lane	Athlete	Nation	Time	Notes
1	5	Luca Ekler	Hungary	1:01.02	Q
2	8	Rhiannon Clarke	Australia	1:01.39	Q, AR
3	4	Lindy Ave	Germany	1:01.58	Q
4	9	Chen Zimo	China	1:02.67	
5	3	Darian Faisury Jiménez	Colombia	1:06.60	
6	6	Milagros del Valle González	Argentina	1:07.92	
7	7	Ericka Esteban	Guatemala	1:11.79	PB

=== Final ===
Rank	Lane	Athlete	Nation	Time	Notes
1st place, gold medalist(s)	8	Karen Palomeque	Colombia	58.67	WR
2nd place, silver medalist(s)	5	Luca Ekler	Hungary	59.35	AR
3rd place, bronze medalist(s)	9	Lindy Ave	Germany	1:00.37	SB
4	7	Margarita Goncharova	Neutral Paralympic Athletes	1:00.64	
5	6	Rhiannon Clarke	Australia	1:00.81	AR
6	4	Ali Smith	Great Britain	1:00.88	PB
7	3	Nele Moos	Germany	1:00.91	PB
8	2	Sofia Pace	France	1:02.29	PB
