= Sofia Pace =

French Paralympic sprinter (born 1994)

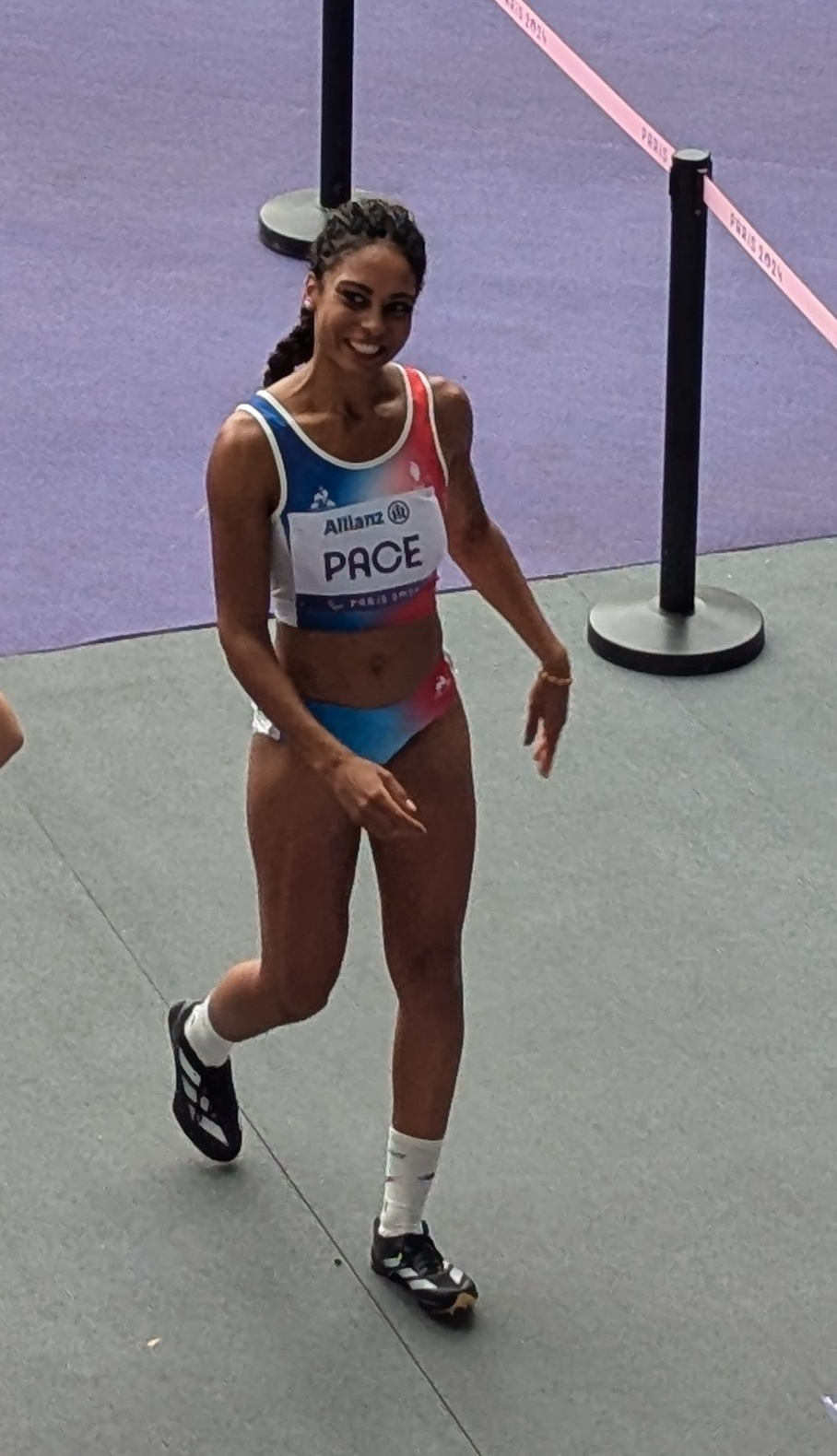
- Pace at 2024 Summer Paralympics

Personal information
- Born: 19 December 1994 (age 31) Compiègne, France

Sport
- Sport: Paralympic athletics
- Disability: Multiple sclerosis
- Disability class: T38
- Club: Nogent-sur-Oise athletics club

Sofia Pace (born 19 December 1994) is a French Paralympic sprinter who competes in international track and field competitions. She is a three-time French para-athletics champion at the national indoor athletics championships. She competed at the 2024 Summer Paralympics where she reached the 400m T38 final.
