= Tiffany Logette-Lods =

French para athlete (born 1994)

Personal information
- Nationality: French
- Born: 22 July 1994 (age 31) Bar-le-Duc

Sport
- Sport: Para athletics
- Disability class: T11
Medal record
Para athletics
Representing France
World Championships
| Silver medal – second place | 2025 New Delhi | Long jump T11 |

Tiffany Logette-Lods (born 22 July 1994) is a visually impaired French para athlete who specializes in long jump.

== Career ==
Logette-Lods began competing in para athletics in 2016. In February 2024, at the Meeting de Paris Indoor, she finished in second place in the 60 m event.

Making her international debut, Logette-Lods competed at the 2025 World Para Athletics Championships and won a silver medal in the long jump T11 event.
