= Luca Ekler =

Hungarian Paralympic athlete

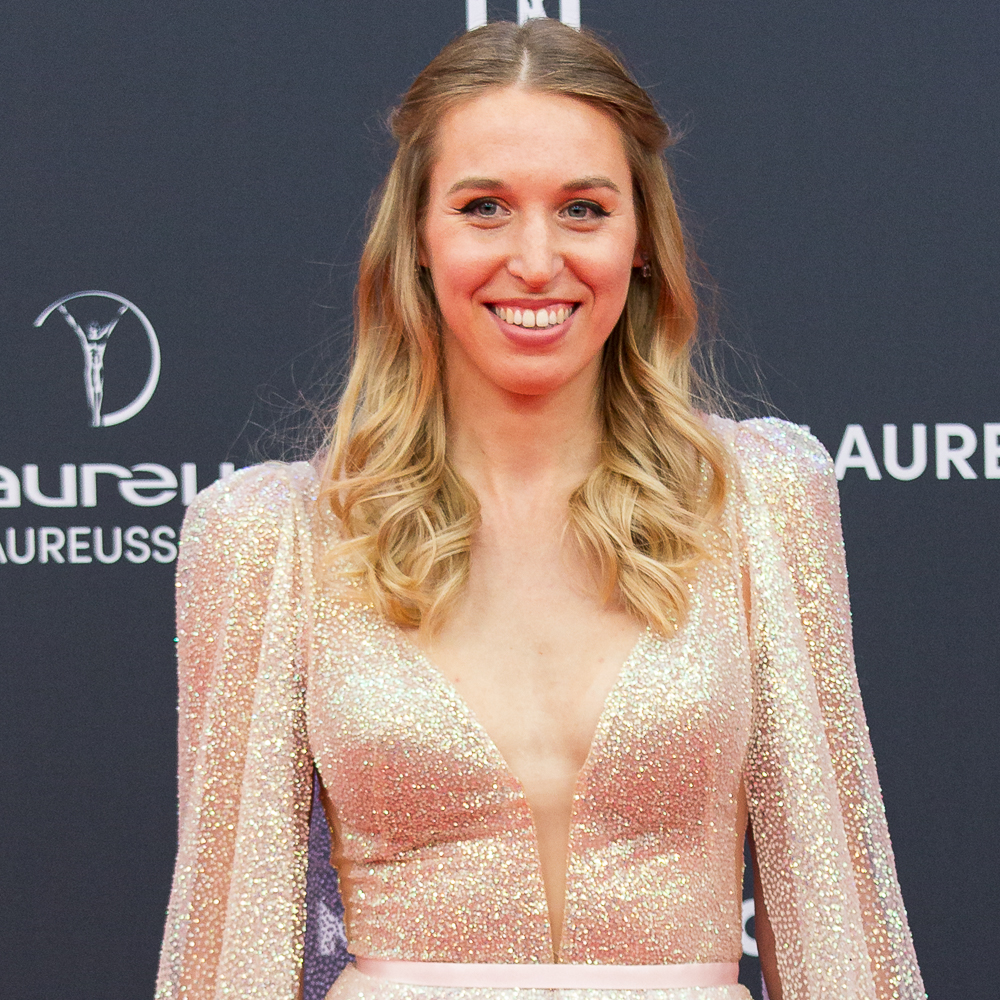

Personal information
- Born: 28 October 1998 (age 27) Szombathely, Hungary

Sport
- Country: Hungary
- Sport: Paralympic athletics
- Disability: Hemiplegia
- Disability class: F/T38
- Events: Long jump, 100 metres, 200 metres
- Coached by: László Szalma
Medal record
Women's para athletics
Representing Hungary
Paralympic Games
Gold medal – first place	2020 Tokyo	Long jump T38
Gold medal – first place	2024 Paris	Long jump T38
Silver medal – second place	2024 Paris	400 m T38
World Championships
Gold medal – first place	2019 Dubai	Long jump T38
Gold medal – first place	2023 Paris	200 m T38
Gold medal – first place	2023 Paris	400 m T38
Gold medal – first place	2023 Paris	Long jump T38
Gold medal – first place	2024 Kobe	Long jump T38
Gold medal – first place	2024 Kobe	100 m T38
Gold medal – first place	2025 New Delhi	Long jump T38
Silver medal – second place	2019 Dubai	100 m T38
Silver medal – second place	2019 Dubai	200 m T38
Silver medal – second place	2023 Paris	100 m T38
Bronze medal – third place	2025 New Delhi	200 m T38
European Championships
Gold medal – first place	2018 Berlin	Women's long jump T38
Gold medal – first place	2021 Bydgoszcz	Women's long jump T38
Gold medal – first place	2021 Bydgoszcz	Women's 400m T38
Silver medal – second place	2021 Bydgoszcz	Women's 100m T38
Bronze medal – third place	2018 Berlin	Women's 200m T38

Luca Ekler (born 28 October 1998) is a Hungarian Paralympic athlete who competes in the 100 metres, 200 metres and long jump events. She is a three-time European Champion and one-time World Champion.

== Personal life ==
She is the sister of water polo players Bendegúz Ekler and Zsombor Ekler, who both play for the Hungarian national team and won a bronze medal at the 2018 Youth World Water Polo Championships.

Ekler had a brain haemorrhage aged ten and has paralysis on the left side of her body.
