= Sayers Grooms =

American Paralympic athlete (born 2005)

Personal information
- Born: June 23, 2005 (age 21) Gainesville, Florida

Sport
- Country: United States
- Sport: Paralympic athletics
- Disability class: T72
- Events: 100 metres, 200 metres, 400 metres
Medal record
Paralympic athletics
Representing United States
World Championships
Bronze medal – third place	2024 Kobe	100m T72

Ann "Sayers" Grooms (born June 23, 2005) is an American Paralympic athlete who competes in sprinting events at international track and field competitions. She is a World bronze medalist in sprinting.

== Early life ==
Grooms was born on June 23, 2005, having had ataxic cerebral palsy since birth. As a result of having this disability, she did not learn to walk until three years of age. She also underwent multiple appointments of physical therapy. She attended Oak Hall School alongside her older sister Harrison who is also a sprinter.

At the age of six, Grooms told her parents that she desired to become an Paralympian. To fulfill this dream, Groom's mother Mary introduced her to frame running.

== Career ==
Grooms made her international debut in 2023 World Para Athletics Championships, in the 100 m event, where she finished in last place. She returned to the World Para Athletics Championships the following year. Still competing in the 100 metres, she won the bronze medal, becoming the first American to win a world medal in frame running.

In August 2025, Grooms was named to the American para athletics team for the 2025 World Para Athletics Championships.
