= Zileide Cassiano =

Brazilian Paralympic athlete (born 1998)

Personal information
- Full name: Zileide Cassiano da Silva
- Born: 6 February 1998 (age 28) Ribeirão Preto, São Paulo, Brazil

Sport
- Sport: Para athletics
- Disability class: T20
- Event: Long jump
Medal record
Representing Brazil
Paralympic Games
Silver medal – second place	2024 Paris	Long jump T20
World Championships
Gold medal – first place	2024 Paris	Long jump T20
Gold medal – first place	2025 New Delhi	Long jump T20
Silver medal – second place	2023 Paris	Long jump T20

Zileide Cassiano da Silva (born 6 February 1998) is a Brazilian Paralympic athlete who competes in international track and field competitions, she is a World champion in the long jump. She is a multiple regional and national champion in sprinting events, long jump and triple jump, she is a former hurdler. She has qualified to compete at the 2024 Summer Paralympics.

Cassiano had been training with non-disabled athletes before she was diagnosed with an intellectual disability in 2021. She is named after Brazilian journalist Zileide Silva inspired by her father.
