= Yokutkhon Kholbekova =

Uzbekistani para athlete (born 1995)

Personal information
- Nationality: Uzbekistani
- Born: 6 April 1995 (age 31)

Sport
- Sport: Para-athletics
- Disability class: T12
Medal record
Women's para-athletics
Representing Uzbekistan
World Championships
Gold medal – first place	2024 Kobe	Long jump T12
Gold medal – first place	2025 New Delhi	Long jump T12
Silver medal – second place	2023 Paris	Long jump T12

Yokutkhon Kholbekova (born 6 April 1995) is an Uzbekistani para athlete.

== Career ==
Kholbekova made her Paralympic debut for Uzbekistan at the 2018 Winter Paralympics in cross-country skiing. She competed in the 1.5 km sprint classical and 7.5 kilometre classical. She also competed at the 2020 and 2024 Summer Paralympics. Her best finish was fourth place in the long jump T12 event at the 2020 Summer Paralympics.

She competed at the 2024 World Para Athletics Championships and won a gold medal in the long jump T12 event. She competed at the 2025 World Para Athletics Championships and again won a gold medal in the long jump T12 event.
