= Kiara Rodríguez =

Ecuadorian Paralympic athlete

Kiara Rodriguez
Personal information
- Full name: Kiara Briggitte Rodriguez
- Born: 12 December 2002 (age 23)
- Height: 1.74 m (5 ft 9 in)

Sport
- Country: Ecuador
- Sport: Paralympic athletics
- Disability class: T46
- Event(s): Long jump 100 metres 200 metres
- Club: Guayas Province
- Coached by: Jose Valdes
Medal record
Women's para-athletics
Representing Ecuador
Paralympic Games
Gold medal – first place	2024 Paris	100 m T47
Gold medal – first place	2024 Paris	Long jump T47
Bronze medal – third place	2020 Tokyo	Long jump T47
World Championships
Gold medal – first place	2019 Dubai	Long jump T47
Gold medal – first place	2023 Paris	Long jump T47
Gold medal – first place	2023 Paris	100 m T47
Gold medal – first place	2024 Kobe	Long jump T47
Gold medal – first place	2024 Kobe	100 m T47
Gold medal – first place	2025 New Delhi	Long jump T47
Gold medal – first place	2025 New Delhi	100 m T47
Gold medal – first place	2025 New Delhi	200 m T47
Parapan American Games
Gold medal – first place	2019 Lima	Long jump T47
Gold medal – first place	2023 Santiago	Long jump T47

Kiara Briggitte Rodriguez (born 12 December 2002) is an Ecuadorian Paralympic athlete who competes in sprint and long jump events in international level events.
