= Manon Genest =

French paralympic athlete (born 1992)

Personal information
- Born: 29 December 1992 (age 33) Châteauroux, France

Sport
- Country: France
- Sport: Paralympic athletics Paratriathlon
- Disability: Cerebral palsy
- Disability class: T37
- Event(s): 200 metres 400 metres Long jump
Medal record
Representing France
Paralympic athletics
Paralympic Games
Bronze medal – third place	2024 Paris	Long jump T37
World Championships
Bronze medal – third place	2023 Paris	Long jump T37
European Championships
Silver medal – second place	2018 Berlin	200m T37
Silver medal – second place	2018 Berlin	400m T37
Silver medal – second place	2021 Bydgoszcz	Long jump T37
Paratriathlon
ITU World Championships
Gold medal – first place	2016 Rotterdam	Women's PT3

Manon Genest (born 29 December 1992) is a French Paralympic athlete and former paratriathlete. She is a World bronze medalist, three-time European silver medalist in track and field and a former World paratriathlon champion, she competed at the 2020 Summer Paralympics in the women's long jump T37 where she finished in fourth place.
