= Karen Palomeque =

Colombian Paralympic athlete (born 1994)

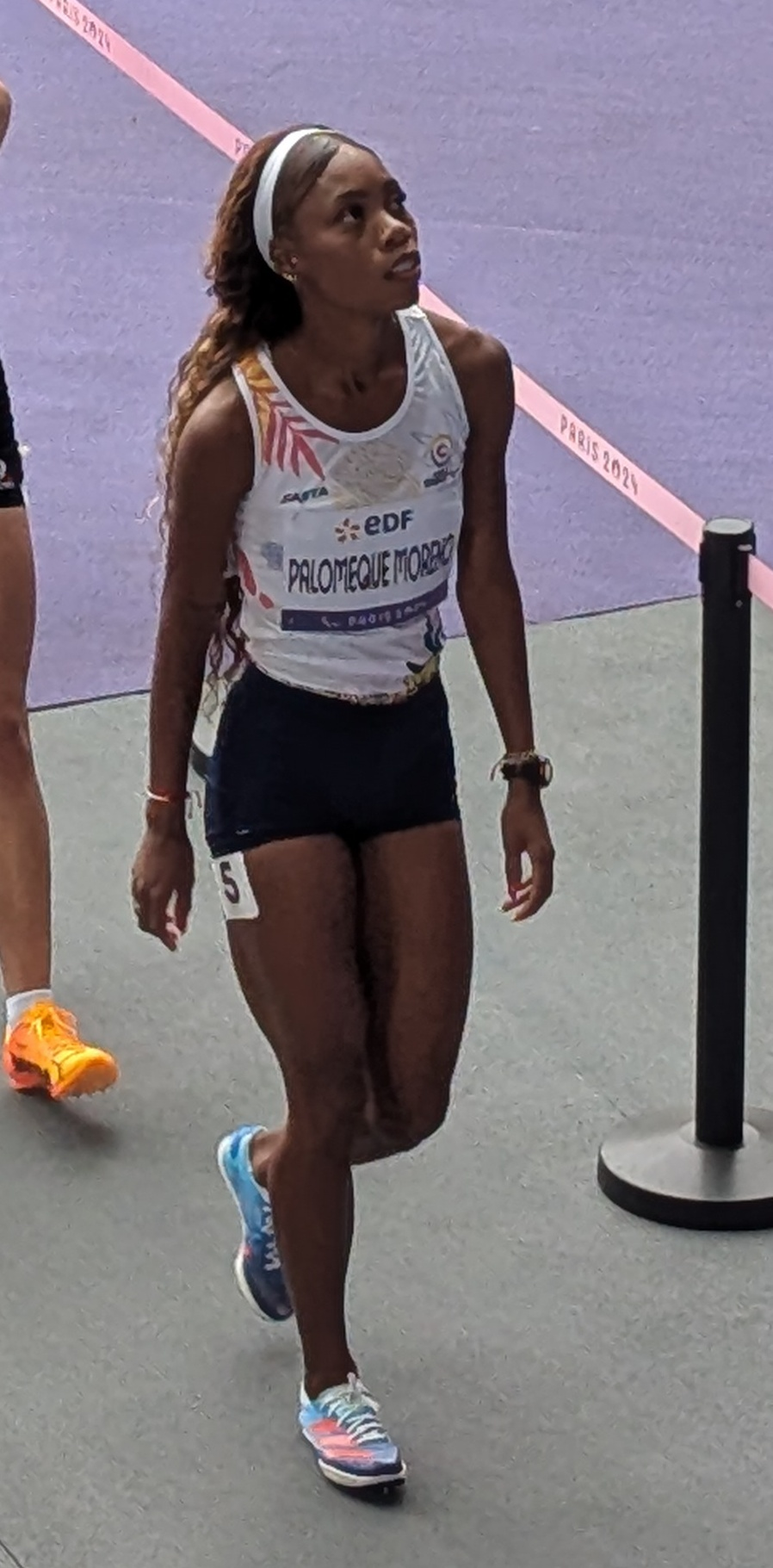
- Palomeque in 2024 Summer Paralympics

Personal information
- Full name: Karen Tatiana Palomeque Moreno
- Born: 6 July 1994 (age 31) Medellín, Colombia

Sport
- Country: Colombia
- Sport: Para-athletics; Athletics
- Disability: Hemiparesis
- Disability class: T36; T37; T38
- Events: 100 metres; 200 metres; 400 metres; 400 metres hurdles; Long jump
- Coached by: Raúl Díaz
Medal record
Representing Colombia
Women's para-athletics
| Event | 1st | 2nd | 3rd |
|---|---|---|---|
| Paralympic Games | 2 | 0 | 1 |
| World Championships | 7 | 2 | 2 |
| Parapan American Games | 5 | 0 | 0 |
| Total | 14 | 2 | 3 |
Paralympic Games
| Gold medal – first place | 2024 Paris | 100 m T38 |
| Gold medal – first place | 2024 Paris | 400 m T38 |
| Bronze medal – third place | 2024 Paris | Long jump T38 |
World Championships
| Gold medal – first place | 2023 Paris | 100 m T37 |
| Gold medal – first place | 2023 Paris | 200 m T37 |
| Gold medal – first place | 2023 Paris | 400 m T37 |
| Gold medal – first place | 2024 Kobe | 200 m T38 |
| Gold medal – first place | 2024 Kobe | 400 m T38 |
| Gold medal – first place | 2025 New Delhi | 200 m T38 |
| Gold medal – first place | 2025 New Delhi | 400 m T38 |
| Silver medal – second place | 2024 Kobe | 100 m T38 |
| Silver medal – second place | 2025 New Delhi | 100 m T38 |
| Bronze medal – third place | 2024 Kobe | Long jump T38 |
| Bronze medal – third place | 2025 New Delhi | Long jump T38 |
Parapan American Games
| Gold medal – first place | 2023 Santiago | 100 m T37 |
| Gold medal – first place | 2023 Santiago | 200 m T37 |
| Gold medal – first place | 2023 Santiago | 400 m T38 |
| Gold medal – first place | 2023 Santiago | Long jump T36/37/38 |
| Gold medal – first place | 2023 Santiago | Universal 4×100 m relay |
Women's athletics
| Event | 1st | 2nd | 3rd |
|---|---|---|---|
| South American U20 Championships | 0 | 0 | 1 |
| South American U18 Championships | 0 | 0 | 1 |
| Total | 0 | 0 | 2 |
South American U20 Championships
| Bronze medal – third place | 2011 Medellín | 400 m hurdles |
South American U18 Championships
| Bronze medal – third place | 2010 Santiago | 400 m hurdles |

Karen Tatiana Palomeque Moreno (born 6 July 1994) is a Colombian Paralympic athlete who competes in sprinting and long jump events at international track and field competitions. She is a five-time Parapan American Games champion and a three-time World Champion, she is also a world record holder for the 100m and 200m in her sports classification.
