= Zhou Guohua =

Chinese Paralympic athlete (born 1990)

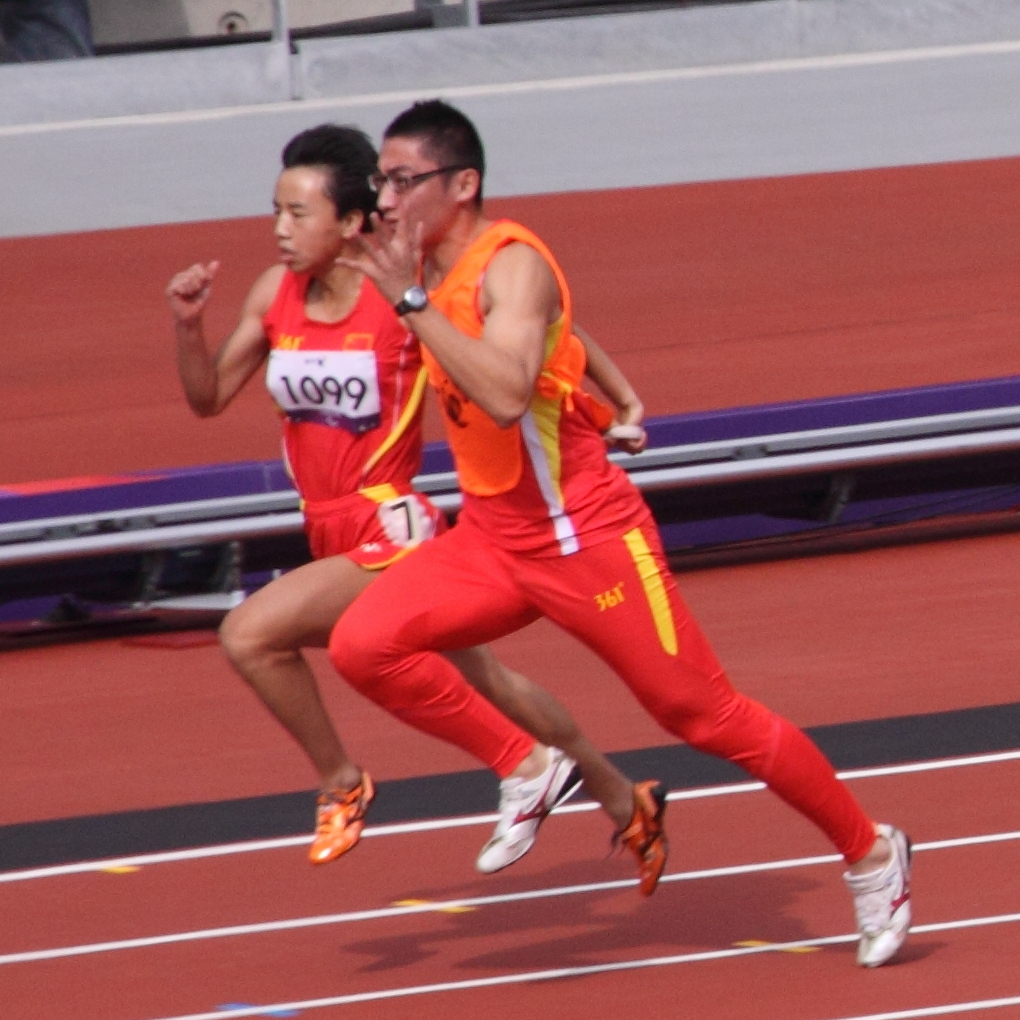
- Zhou of China and her guide Jie Li in 2012

Personal information
- Nationality: Chinese
- Born: 10 October 1990 (age 35) Ulanqab
- Height: 165 cm (5 ft 5 in)

Sport
- Country: China
- Sport: Athletics
- Disability class: T12
- Club: Guangdong Province
- Coached by: Hu Zhengguan
Medal record
Paralympic athletics
Representing China
Paralympic Games
| Gold medal – first place | 2012 London | 100m T12 |
| Gold medal – first place | 2016 Rio | 4×100m relay T11–13 |
| Gold medal – first place | 2024 Paris | mixed 4×100 m relay |
| Silver medal – second place | 2012 London | 200m T12 |
| Silver medal – second place | 2024 Paris | Long jump T11 |
| Bronze medal – third place | 2016 Rio de Janeiro | 200m T12 |
World Championships
| Gold medal – first place | 2013 Lyon | 100m T12 |
| Gold medal – first place | 2015 Doha | 4x100m relay T11–13 |
| Bronze medal – third place | 2023 Paris | Long jump T11 |
| Bronze medal – third place | 2024 Kobe | Long jump T11 |
Asian Para Games
| Gold medal – first place | 2014 Incheon | 100m T12 |
| Gold medal – first place | 2014 Incheon | 4 × 100 m relay T11–13 |
| Silver medal – second place | 2014 Incheon | 400m T11/12 |
| Silver medal – second place | 2018 Jakarta | 100m T11 |
| Silver medal – second place | 2018 Jakarta | 200m T11 |
| Silver medal – second place | 2018 Jakarta | 400m T11 |
| Silver medal – second place | 2022 Hangzhou | 100m T11 |
| Silver medal – second place | 2022 Hangzhou | 200m T11 |

Zhou Guohua (born 10 October 1990) is a visually impaired Paralympian athlete from China competing mainly in T12 classification sprint events. In London in 2012 she became the T12 record holder at 100m.

== Life ==
Zhou was born in Ulanqab in Inner Mongolia in 1990 with poor eyesight. She was discovered in Dongguan in 2009 where she was working as a masseuse. Luo Jinhui from the local disable association identified her athletic stature and suggested she could make a better living as an athlete. By 2011 she was able to become a professional after taking medals at the national paragames. She did not compete a lot in international events until just before the 2012 Paralympics where she took two gold medals in Croatia at 100 and 200 metres.

Zhou won two medals at her first Summer Paralympics, the 2012 London Games, including the gold medal in the women's 100m sprint. Here she set a new world record of 12.05 seconds in the T12 event. The time was so quick that this would place her in the top women in the world irrespective of her disability. She is also a World Championships and Asian Games medalists, winning five medals over four tournaments. At the 2014 Asian Para Games she set an Asian record in the 400m T12 sprint with a time of 58.45.
