= Kiki Hendriks =

Dutch para athlete (born 2000)

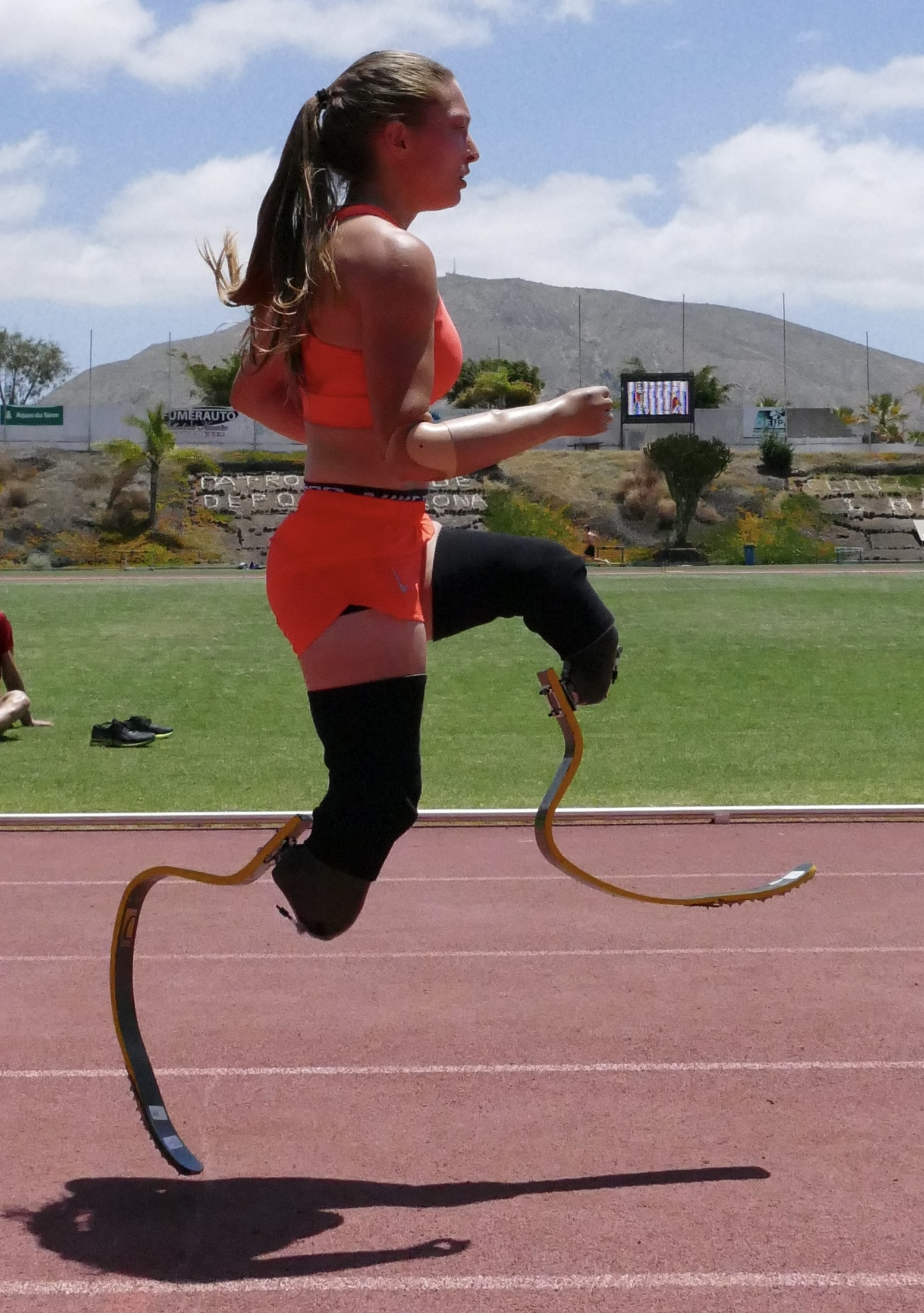

Personal information
- Nationality: Dutch
- Born: 18 September 2000 (age 25)

Sport
- Sport: Para-athletics
- Disability class: T62
Medal record
Women's para-athletics
Representing the Netherlands
World Championships
Silver medal – second place	2025 New Delhi	Long jump T64

Kiki Hendriks (born 18 September 2000) is a Dutch para athlete who competes in long jump and sprinting events. She represented the Netherlands at the 2024 Summer Paralympics.

== Career ==
Hendriks represented the Netherlands at the 2024 Summer Paralympics and finished in fourth place in the long jump T64 event, with a jump of 5.35 metres. She competed at the 2025 World Para Athletics Championships and won a silver medal in the long jump T64 event. She also competed in the 100 metres T64 event and finished in fourth place with a time of 13.21 seconds.

== Personal life ==
When Hendriks was two years old she contracted Meningococcal disease. She survived, but her left lower leg, right hand, and the fingers of her left hand had died. As a result of contracting Meningococcal disease in 2003, the growth plates in her lower right leg were damaged, causing the leg to grow crooked. During an operation in 2015, a nerve was hit, and a result, she could no longer lift her foot. This led to the decision to also amputate her lower right leg in 2018.
