= Iida Lounela =

Finnish athlete

Personal information
- Born: 27 October 2003 (age 22) Ilmajoki, Finland

Sport
- Sport: Paralympic athletics
- Club: Jalostaja para team
Medal record
Representing Finland
World Championships
Silver medal – second place	2025 New Delhi	Long jump T12
European Championships
Bronze medal – third place	2021 Bydgoszcz	400m T12

Iida Lounela (born 27 October 2003) is a Finnish Paralympic athlete who competes in international track and field competitions. She is a European bronze medalist and has competed at the 2024 Summer Paralympics where she finished in fourth place in the long jump T12.

As well as athletics training, she is studying social sciences at the University of Helsinki.
