= Bjørk Nørremark =

Danish Paralympic athlete (born 2002)

Personal information
- Full name: Bjørk Kjellmann Nørremark
- Nationality: Danish
- Born: 25 September 2002 (age 23) Hvidovre, Denmark

Sport
- Sport: Para-athletics
- Disability class: T47
- Event: long jump
Medal record
Women's para-athletics
Representing Denmark
Paralympic Games
Bronze medal – third place	2024 Paris	Long jump T47
World Championships
Bronze medal – third place	2025 New Delhi	Long jump T47

Bjørk Kjellmann Nørremark (born 25 September 2002) is a Danish para-athlete specializing in long jump.

== Career ==
Nørremark represented Denmark at the 2024 Summer Paralympics and won a bronze medal in the long jump T47 event.
