= Delya Boulaghlem =

French Paralympic athlete

Personal information
- Born: 26 July 1989 (age 36) Grenoble, France

Sport
- Sport: Paralympic athletics
- Disability class: T11
- Event(s): 100 metres 200 metres 400 metres Long jump
- Club: Lyon Athletics Club
- Coached by: Thomas Verro
Medal record
Representing France
European Championships
| Silver medal – second place | 2021 Bydgoszcz | 200m T11 |
| Bronze medal – third place | 2021 Bydgoszcz | 100m T11 |

Delya Boulaghlem (born 26 July 1989) is a French Paralympic athlete who competes in international track and field competitions. She is a two-time European medalists in sprinting and has qualified to compete in 2024 Summer Paralympics.
