= Petra Luterán =

Hungarian Paralympic athlete (born 1997)

Personal information
- Nationality: Hungarian
- Born: 15 June 1997 (age 29)
- Home town: Tatabánya, Hungary

Sport
- Sport: Para-athletics
- Disability class: T47
- Event(s): sprints long jump
Medal record
Women's para-athletics
Representing Hungary
Paralympic Games
Silver medal – second place	2024 Paris	Long jump T47
World Championships
Silver medal – second place	2025 New Delhi	Long jump T47
Bronze medal – third place	2024 Kobe	Long jump T47
Bronze medal – third place	2024 Kobe	400 m T47

Petra Luterán (born 15 June 1997) is a Hungarian T47 Paralympic sprint runner and long jumper. She represented Hungary at the 2024 Summer Paralympics.

== Career ==
Luterán represented Hungary at the 2024 Summer Paralympics and won a silver medal in the long jump T47 event.
