= Maya Nakanishi =

Japanese Paralympic athlete (born 1985)

Personal information
- Nationality: Japanese
- Born: March 6, 1985 (age 41) Ōsaka, Ōsaka Prefecture, Japan
- Height: 158 cm (5 ft 2 in)
- Website: Official website

Sport
- Sport: Track and Field
- Disability class: T44
- Event(s): 100m 200m Long jump
- Coached by: Al Joyner

Achievements and titles
- Highest world ranking: 2008 Summer Paralympics: 100m – 6th 200m – 4th
Medal record
Women's para athletics
Representing Japan
World Championships
Gold medal – first place	2019 Dubai	Long jump T64
Bronze medal – third place	2017 London	Long jump T44
Bronze medal – third place	2023 Paris	Long jump T64
Bronze medal – third place	2024 Kobe	Long jump T64
Asian Para Games
Gold medal – first place	2018 Jakarta	Long jump T42-44/61-64

Maya Nakanishi (中西 麻耶, Nakanishi Maya; born 3 June 1985) is a Paralympic athlete from Japan, competing in category T44 sprint and long jump events. She was born in Ōsaka, Ōsaka Prefecture, and played soft tennis competitively.

== Career ==
In 2006 while working at a paint factory she was struck by a 5-tonne steel frame. Her right lower leg was amputated below the knee. After finding the transition back to tennis difficult she was encouraged to switch to track and field and quickly found success, setting Japanese records in the F44 category for the 100 and 200 meter events shortly after.

Nakanishi competed in the 2008 Summer Paralympics in Beijing, China, where she placed 4th in the women's 200 m F44 event, and finished sixth in the women's 100 metres.

Due to lack of funds, Nakanishi was unable to participate in the 2011 IPC Athletics World Championships in Christchurch, New Zealand. Japanese government support for Paralympic athletes is limited, and while training for the London Olympics in 2012 she found it difficult to raise enough funds to compete and to purchase a new prosthetic leg. She published a calendar in which she appears semi-nude with her prosthetic leg, photographed by photographer Takao Ochi. The calendar sold more than 3,000 copies and raised more than US$50,000 for equipment, training and travel expenses. At the London Olympics she placed 8th in the women's long jump – F42/44 event. She also competed in the women's 100 m and 200 m events but failed to qualify for the finals.

On 7 September 2014, Nakanishi won the T44 long jump at the Japan Para Championships, setting a personal record at 5.33 m. The International Paralympic Committee recognized this as a Japanese record. In December 2014 sports writer Tatsuhito Kaneko published a biography of Nakanishi titled Last One (『ラスト・ワン』).
