= Anais Angeline =

Mauritian para athlete (born 1999)

Personal information
- Full name: Anais Anne Lise Angeline
- Born: 18 April 1999 (age 27) Mauritius

Sport
- Sport: Para-athletics
- Disability class: T37
Medal record
Women's para-athletics
Representing Mauritius
World Championships
| Silver medal – second place | 2025 New Delhi | Long jump T37 |

Anais Anne Lise Angeline (born 18 April 1999) is a Mauritian para athlete. She represented Mauritius at the 2020 and 2024 Summer Paralympics.

== Career ==
Angeline represented Mauritius at the 2024 Summer Paralympics and finished in sixth place in the long jump T37 event. She competed at the 2025 World Para Athletics Championships and won a silver medal in the long jump T37 event.
