= Athletics at the 2024 Summer Paralympics – Women's 100 metres T64 =

Women's 100 metres T64 at the XVII Paralympic Games
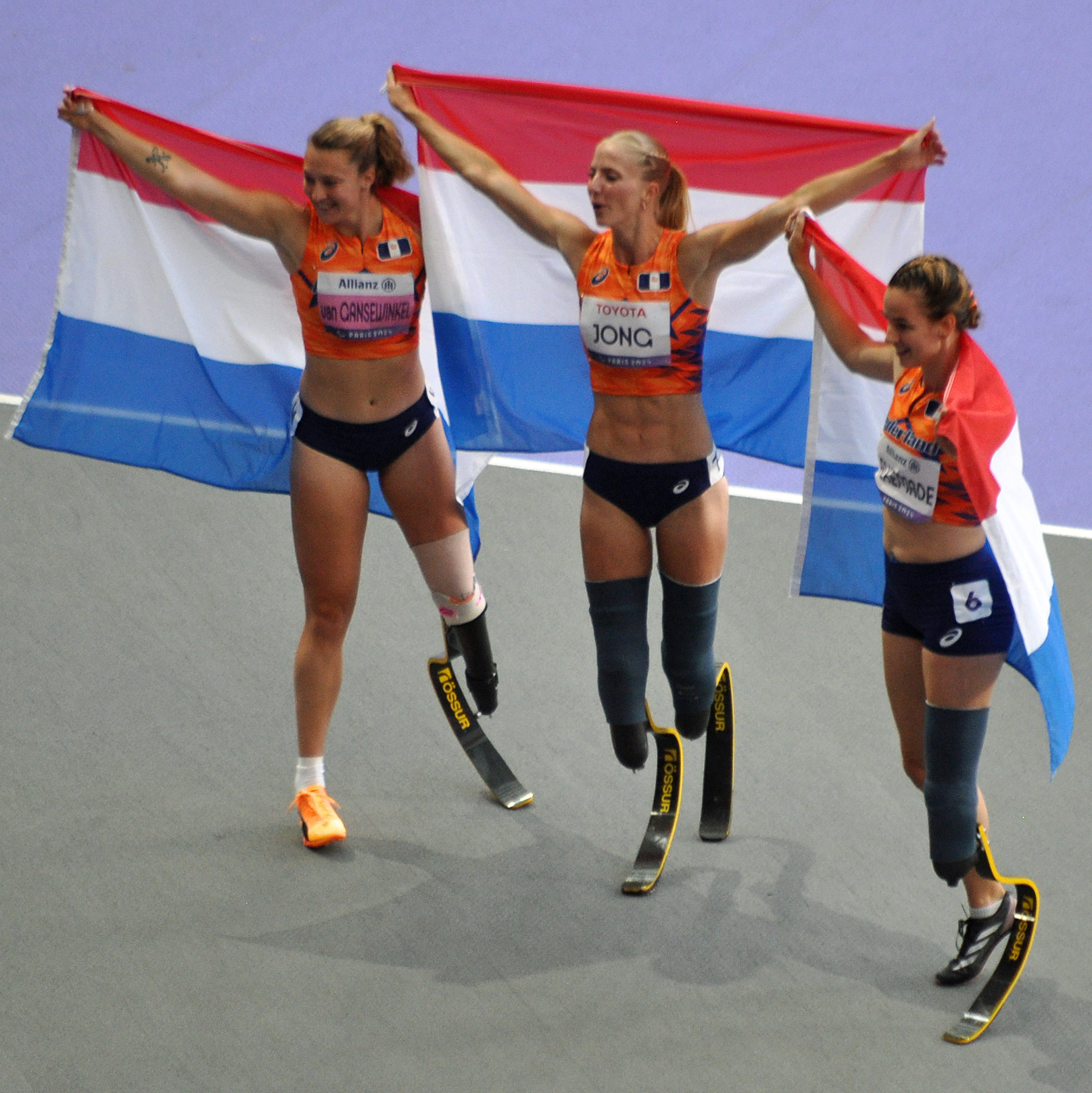
- Marlene van Gansewinkel, Fleur Jong and Kimberly Alkemade
- Venue: Stade de France
- Dates: 5 September 2024 (heats); 6 September 2024 (final)
- Competitors: 15 from 9 nations
- Winning time: 12.54

Medalists
1st place, gold medalist(s)		Fleur Jong	Netherlands
2nd place, silver medalist(s)		Kimberly Alkemade	Netherlands
3rd place, bronze medalist(s)		Marlene van Gansewinkel	Netherlands

100 metres at the 2024 Summer Paralympics
Men · T11 · T12 · T13 · T34 · T35 · T36 · T37 · T38 · T44 · T47 · T51 · T52 · T53 · T54 · T63 · T64
Women · T11 · T12 · T13 · T34 · T35 · T36 · T37 · T38 · T47 · T53 · T54 · T63 · T64

The women's 100 metres T64 event at the 2024 Summer Paralympics in Paris, was on the 5 and 6 September 2024. It was won by Fleur Jong.

== Classification ==
T64 is for athletes with movement moderately affected in one lower leg or the absence of one or both legs below the knee, who have difficulty accelerating evenly out of the blocks and maintaining an even stride, particularly in the drive phase of the race. T44, T62 and T64 athletes compete together.

== Records ==
Prior to the competition, the existing records were as follows:

T44 Records

World record	Irmgard Bensusan (GER)	12.72	Leverkusen, Germany	21 June 2019
Paralympic record	Irmgard Bensusan (GER)	12.89	Tokyo, Japan	3 September 2021

T62 Records

World record	Fleur Jong (NED)	12.35	Hengelo, Netherlands	30 June 2024
Paralympic record	Fleur Jong (NED)	13.10	Tokyo, Japan	3 September 2021

T64 Records

World record	Kimberly Alkemade (NED)	12.46	Nottwil, Switzerland	7 June 2024
Paralympic record	Marlene van Gansewinkel (NED)	12.78	Tokyo, Japan	3 September 2021

== Results ==
=== Round 1 ===
First 3 in each heat (Q) and the next 2 fastest (q) advance to the final

==== Heat 1 ====
Rank	Lane	Class	Athlete	Nation	Time	Notes
1	9	T64	Kimberly Alkemade	Netherlands	12.61	Q, PR
2	2	T64	Marlene van Gansewinkel	Netherlands	12.68	Q
3	3	T44	Irmgard Bensusan	Germany	13.20	Q
4	6	T64	Beatriz Hatz	United States	13.28	
5	4	T44	Annie Carey	United States	13.39	
6	5	T64	Yaimillie Marie Diaz Colon	Puerto Rico	13.62	PB
7	7	T64	Giuliana Chiara Filippi	Italy	13.73 (.722)	
8	8	T64	Fiona Pinar Batalla	Spain	13.73 (.728)	
Source:					Wind: -0.2 m/s	

==== Heat 2 ====
Rank	Lane	Class	Athlete	Nation	Time	Notes
1	4	T62	Fleur Jong	Netherlands	12.48	Q, PR
2	7	T64	Femita Ayanbeku	United States	12.98	Q, PB
3	8	T62	Abassia Rahmani	Switzerland	13.06	Q, PB
4	9	T62	Sara Andres Barrio	Spain	13.20	q
5	3	T64	Marissa Papaconstantinou	Canada	13.24	q
6	6	T64	Saki Takakuwa	Japan	13.85	
7	5	T64	Amaris Sofia Vazquez Collazo	Puerto Rico	15.57	
Source:					Wind: -0.3 m/s	

=== Final ===
Rank	Lane	Class	Athlete	Nation	Time	Notes
1st place, gold medalist(s)	7	T62	Fleur Jong	Netherlands	12.54	
2nd place, silver medalist(s)	6	T64	Kimberly Alkemade	Netherlands	12.70	
3rd place, bronze medalist(s)	4	T64	Marlene van Gansewinkel	Netherlands	12.72	
4	2	T62	Sara Andres Barrio	Spain	13.03	
5	8	T62	Abassia Rahmani	Switzerland	13.10	
6	5	T64	Femita Ayanbeku	United States	13.15	
7	9	T64	Marissa Papaconstantinou	Canada	13.25	
8	3	T44	Irmgard Bensusan	Germany	13.31	
Source:					Wind: -0.2 m/s	
