= Athletics at the 2020 Summer Paralympics – Women's 100 metres T64 =

Women's 100 metres T64 at the XVI Paralympic Games
- Venue: Tokyo National Stadium
- Dates: 2 September 2021 (heats); 3 September 2021 (final)
- Competitors: 14 from 9 nations
- Winning time: 12.78

Medalists
1st place, gold medalist(s)		Marlene van Gansewinkel	Netherlands
2nd place, silver medalist(s)		Irmgard Bensusan	Germany
3rd place, bronze medalist(s)		Marissa Papaconstantinou	Canada

The women's 100 metres T64 event at the 2020 Summer Paralympics in Tokyo, took place between 30 and 31 August 2021.

== Records ==
Prior to the competition, the existing records were as follows:

World record	Marlene van Gansewinkel (NED)	12.66	Nottwil, Switzerland	24 May 2019
Paralympic record	Sophie Kamlish (GBR)	12.93	Rio de Janeiro, Brazil	17 September 2016

Area	Time	Athlete	Nation
Africa	Vacant		
America	12.84	Femita Ayanbeku	United States
Asia	13.43	Saki Takakuwa	Japan
Europe	12.66 WR	Marlene van Gansewinkel	Netherlands
Oceania	14.51	Anna Steven	New Zealand

== Results ==
=== Heats ===
Heat 1 took place on 2 September, at 20:55:

Rank	Lane	Name	Nationality	Class	Time	Notes
1	6	Marlene van Gansewinkel	Netherlands	T64	12.82	Q, GR
2	2	Irmgard Bensusan	Germany	T44	13.01	Q
3	4	Sophie Kamlish	Great Britain	T64	13.32	Q
4	7	Sara Andres Barrio	Spain	T62	13.39	q
5	3	Saki Takakuwa	Japan	T64	13.43	=AR
6	8	Sydney Barta	United States	T64	13.48	
7	5	Yaimillie Marie Diaz Colon	Puerto Rico	T64	14.81	PB

Heat 2 took place on 2 September, at 21:01:

Rank	Lane	Name	Nationality	Class	Time	Notes
1	3	Kimberly Alkemade	Netherlands	T64	13.06	Q
2	5	Marissa Papaconstantinou	Canada	T64	13.22	Q, SB
3	7	Beatriz Hatz	United States	T64	13.26	Q
4	8	Fleur Jong	Netherlands	T62	13.34	q
5	4	Femita Ayanbeku	United States	T64	13.67	
6	2	Maria Tietze	Germany	T64	13.71	SB
	6	Anna Steven	New Zealand	T64	DQ	WPA 17.8

=== Final ===
The final took place on 3 September 2021, at 19:14:

Rank	Lane	Name	Nationality	Class	Time	Notes
1st place, gold medalist(s)	7	Marlene van Gansewinkel	Netherlands	T64	12.78	GR
2nd place, silver medalist(s)	4	Irmgard Bensusan	Germany	T44	12.89	GR (T44)
3rd place, bronze medalist(s)	6	Marissa Papaconstantinou	Canada	T64	13.07	PB
4	2	Fleur Jong	Netherlands	T62	13.10	GR (T62)
5	5	Kimberly Alkemade	Netherlands	T64	13.12	
6	8	Beatriz Hatz	United States	T64	13.31	
7	3	Sara Andrés Barrio	Spain	T62	13.39	
8	9	Sophie Kamlish	Great Britain	T64	13.49	
