= 2025 World Para Athletics Championships – Women's 100 metres =

The women's 100 metres events at the 2025 World Para Athletics Championships were held at the Jawaharlal Nehru Stadium, Delhi in New Delhi.

== Medalists ==
Event	Gold	Silver	Bronze
T11	Jerusa Geber dos Santos; Brazil	Liu Yiming; China	Alba García Falagán; Spain
T12	Simran; India	Liang Yanfen; China	Nagore Folgado García; Spain
T13	Orla Comerford; Ireland	Rayane Soares da Silva; Brazil	Kym Crosby; United States
T34	Hannah Cockroft; Great Britain	Kare Adenegan; Great Britain	Lan Hanyu; China
T35	Guo Qianqian; China	Preethi Pal; India	Fatimah Suwaed; Iraq
T36	Danielle Aitchison; New Zealand	Mali Lovell; Australia	Verônica Hipólito; Brazil
T37	Wen Xiaoyan; China	Taylor Swanson; United States	Viktoriia Slanova; Neutral Paralympic Athletes
T38	Angie Mejía; Colombia	Karen Palomeque; Colombia	Lida-Maria Manthopoulou; Greece
T44	Victoria Levitt; Great Britain	Annie Carey; United States	Bebe Jackson; Great Britain
T47	Kiara Rodríguez; Ecuador	Maria Clara Augusto; Brazil	Marie Ngoussou Ngouyi; France
T53	Catherine Debrunner; Switzerland	Hamide Doğangün; Turkey	Zhou Hongzhuan; China
T54	Noemi Alphonse; Mauritius	Zübeyde Süpürgeci; Turkey	Zhou Zhaoqian; China
T63	Ambra Sabatini; Italy	Karisma Evi Tiarani; Indonesia	Ndidikama Okoh; Great Britain
T64	Fleur Jong; Netherlands	Marlene van Gansewinkel; Netherlands	Marissa Papaconstantinou; Canada
T71	Thekra Alkaabi; United Arab Emirates	Bella Morkus; Lithuania	Miriam Dominikowska; Poland
T72	Magdalena Andruszkiewicz; Poland	Judith Tortosa Vila; Spain	Zofia Kalucka; Poland

== T11 ==
Final

The event took place on 1 October.

Rank	Lane	Name	Nationality	Time	Notes
1st place, gold medalist(s)	7	Jerusa Geber dos Santos	Brazil	11.81	CR
2nd place, silver medalist(s)	3	Liu Yiming	China	12.11	PB
3rd place, bronze medalist(s)	5	Alba García Falagán	Spain	12.21	PB
4	1	Linda Patricia Pérez López	Venezuela	12.72	SB
				Wind: (+0.9 m/s)	

Round 1

The event took place on 30 September. Qualification: First 1 in each heat (Q) and the next 1 fastest (q) advance to the Final

Rank	Heat	Lane	Name	Nationality	Time	Notes
1	1	3	Liu Yiming	China	12.24	Q, PB
2	3	7	Alba García Falagán	Spain	12.43	Q, PB
3	3	3	Linda Patricia Pérez López	Venezuela	12.83	q, SB
4	1	5	Juliana Ngleya Moko	Angola	12.84	SB
5	2	7	Jerusa Geber dos Santos	Brazil	13.18	Q
6	3	5	Regina Josefina Vieira Dumbo	Angola	13.22	SB
7	2	5	Julie Anndora Asaun	Mauritius	13.81	SB
8	2	3	Irene Cerdá Nicolás	Spain	14.34	
	1	7	Sandra Santana Guillene Tchedjo	Canada	DNS	
				Wind: (−0.4 m/s), (−1.1 m/s), (−2.0 m/s)		

== T12 ==
Final

The event took place on 3 October.

Rank	Lane	Name	Nationality	Time	Notes
1st place, gold medalist(s)	3	Simran	India	11.95	PB
2nd place, silver medalist(s)	5	Liang Yanfen	China	12.11 (.101)	
3rd place, bronze medalist(s)	7	Nagore Folgado García	Spain	12.11 (.104)	PB
4	1	Alejandra Paola Pérez López	Venezuela	12.23	PB
				Wind: (+0.7 m/s)	

Semifinals

The event took place on 3 October. Qualification: First 1 in each heat (Q) and the next 2 fastest (q) advance to the Final

Rank	Heat	Lane	Name	Nationality	Time	Notes
1	1	5	Simran	India	12.08	Q, PB
2	2	3	Liang Yanfen	China	12.15	Q
3	1	7	Nagore Folgado García	Spain	12.24	q
4	2	5	Alejandra Paola Pérez López	Venezuela	12.27	q, PB
5	2	7	Darlenys de la Cruz Severino	Dominican Republic	12.27	SB
6	2	1	Lorraine Gomes de Aguiar	Brazil	12.29	
7	1	3	Shen Yaqin	China	12.41	SB
8	1	1	Manuela Jacinto	Dominican Republic	12.50	
				Wind: (−0.5 m/s), (+0.5 m/s)		

Round 1

The event took place on 2 October. Qualification: First 1 in each heat (Q) and the next 4 fastest (q) advance to the Semi-Final

Rank	Heat	Lane	Name	Nationality	Time	Notes
1	4	5	Liang Yanfen	China	12.11	Q, PB
2	1	3	Simran	India	12.13	Q, =PB
3	4	3	Nagore Folgado García	Spain	12.18	q, PB
4	1	7	Darlenys de la Cruz Severino	Dominican Republic	12.29	q, SB
5	3	7	Alejandra Paola Pérez López	Venezuela	12.29	Q, PB
6	3	5	Lorraine Gomes de Aguiar	Brazil	12.29	q
7	3	3	Manuela Jacinto	Dominican Republic	12.49	q, PB
8	2	7	Shen Yaqin	China	12.51	Q, SB
9	2	5	Ni Made Arianti Putri	Indonesia	12.59	SB
10	1	1	Lahja Ipinge	Namibia	13.43	SB
11	4	7	Iida Lounela	Finland	13.65	
12	1	5	Evelina-Cristina Cretu	Moldova	15.04	SB
	2	3	Clara Daniele Barros da Silva	Brazil	DNF	
	4	1	Daniele Jesus dos Santos	Brazil	DQ	
				Wind: (±0.0 m/s), (−0.5 m/s), (+1.3 m/s), (−0.5 m/s)		

== T13 ==
Final

The event took place on 28 September.

Rank	Lane	Name	Nationality	Time	Notes
1st place, gold medalist(s)	5	Orla Comerford	Ireland	11.88	CR
2nd place, silver medalist(s)	7	Rayane Soares da Silva	Brazil	12.07	
3rd place, bronze medalist(s)	4	Kym Crosby	United States	12.41	SB
4	3	Zara Temmink	Netherlands	12.89	
5	8	Gloria Majaga	Botswana	13.38	SB
6	2	Olga Drozdova	Neutral Paralympic Athletes	13.51	PB
7	6	Adiaratou Iglesias Forneiro	Spain	13.74	
8	9	Melissa Calvo	Costa Rica	13.89	
				Wind: (−0.7 m/s)	

== T34 ==
Final

The event took place on 1 October.

Rank	Lane	Name	Nationality	Time	Notes
1st place, gold medalist(s)	6	Hannah Cockroft	Great Britain	17.28	
2nd place, silver medalist(s)	4	Kare Adenegan	Great Britain	18.08	SB
3rd place, bronze medalist(s)	5	Lan Hanyu	China	18.60	SB
4	8	Moe Onodera	Japan	19.38	
5	7	Fabienne André	Great Britain	19.63	
6	3	Ayano Yoshida	Japan	19.64	
7	2	Coco Espie	Australia	22.74	
8	9	Cecile Goens	Belgium	23.78	
				Wind: (−1.0 m/s)	

== T35 ==
Final

The event took place on 5 October.

Rank	Lane	Name	Nationality	Time	Notes
1st place, gold medalist(s)	5	Guo Qianqian	China	14.24	SB
2nd place, silver medalist(s)	6	Preethi Pal	India	14.33	SB
3rd place, bronze medalist(s)	7	Fatimah Suwaed	Iraq	14.39	PB
4	4	Ingrid Renecka	Poland	15.13	PB
5	8	Mariia Kolobova	Neutral Paralympic Athletes	16.23	PB
6	3	Summer Giddings	Australia	16.95	
7	9	Ellen Westling	Sweden	17.43	
8	2	Anna Luxová	Czech Republic	18.91	
				Wind: (−0.6 m/s)	

Round 1

The event took place on 5 October. Qualification: First 3 in each heat (Q) and the next 2 fastest (q) advance to the Final

Rank	Heat	Lane	Name	Nationality	Time	Notes
1	2	7	Preethi Pal	India	14.50	Q, SB
2	1	6	Guo Qianqian	China	14.71	Q, SB
3	1	8	Ingrid Renecka	Poland	15.54	Q
4	2	5	Fatimah Suwaed	Iraq	15.74	Q, SB
5	2	4	Mariia Kolobova	Neutral Paralympic Athletes	16.48	Q, PB
6	1	4	Summer Giddings	Australia	16.89	Q
7	2	6	Ellen Westling	Sweden	17.20	q
8	1	5	Anna Luxová	Czech Republic	19.08	q
9	1	7	Mariam Bakradze	Georgia	19.52	
				Wind: (+0.4 m/s), (+0.5 m/s)		

== T36 ==
Final

The event took place on 30 September.

Rank	Lane	Name	Nationality	Time	Notes
1st place, gold medalist(s)	7	Danielle Aitchison	New Zealand	13.43	SB
2nd place, silver medalist(s)	5	Mali Lovell	Australia	14.56	
3rd place, bronze medalist(s)	4	Verônica Hipólito	Brazil	14.77	
4	8	Cheyenne Bouthoorn	Netherlands	14.89	
5	3	Kirra Wright	Australia	15.05	
6	6	Jeon Min-jae	South Korea	15.15	
7	9	Abby Craswell	Australia	15.40	
8	2	Yam Kwok Fan	Hong Kong	15.93	
				Wind: (−0.6 m/s)	

Round 1

The event took place on 29 September. Qualification: First 3 in each heat (Q) and the next 2 fastest (q) advance to the Final

Rank	Heat	Lane	Name	Nationality	Time	Notes
1	1	7	Danielle Aitchison	New Zealand	13.98	Q, SB
2	1	6	Mali Lovell	Australia	14.54	Q
3	2	7	Verônica Hipólito	Brazil	14.64	Q
4	2	8	Jeon Min-jae	South Korea	14.73	Q, SB
5	1	3	Kirra Wright	Australia	14.94	Q, PB
6	2	3	Cheyenne Bouthoorn	Netherlands	15.04	Q
7	2	5	Abby Craswell	Australia	15.21	q
8	1	4	Yam Kwok Fan	Hong Kong	15.80	q, SB
9	1	5	Araceli Rotela	Argentina	15.85	
10	2	6	Kate Hwang	United States	16.04	
11	2	4	Maisarah Mohamed Hassan	Singapore	16.92	
				Wind: (+0.1 m/s), (±0.0 m/s)		

== T37 ==
Final

The event took place on 1 October.

Rank	Lane	Name	Nationality	Time	Notes
1st place, gold medalist(s)	4	Wen Xiaoyan	China	12.93	SB
2nd place, silver medalist(s)	7	Taylor Swanson	United States	13.27	
3rd place, bronze medalist(s)	5	Viktoriia Slanova	Neutral Paralympic Athletes	13.79	SB
4	8	Akeesha Snowden	Australia	13.89	
5	6	Sheryl James	South Africa	13.90	
6	9	Yescarly Medina	Venezuela	14.21	
7	3	Liezel Gouws	South Africa	14.32	
8	2	Niamh MacAlasdair	Australia	14.98	
				Wind: (±0.0 m/s)	

Round 1

The event took place on 30 September. Qualification: First 3 in each heat (Q) and the next 2 fastest (q) advance to the Final

Rank	Heat	Lane	Name	Nationality	Time	Notes
1	1	5	Wen Xiaoyan	China	13.07	Q, SB
2	2	3	Taylor Swanson	United States	13.72	Q
3	1	4	Sheryl James	South Africa	13.84	Q, SB
4	1	6	Akeesha Snowden	Australia	14.06	Q
5	2	5	Viktoriia Slanova	Neutral Paralympic Athletes	14.10	Q, SB
6	1	7	Yescarly Medina	Venezuela	14.18	q, SB
7	2	4	Liezel Gouws	South Africa	14.29	Q, SB
8	2	6	Niamh MacAlasdair	Australia	14.85	q, SB
9	2	7	Anais Angeline	Mauritius	14.93	SB
10	1	3	Johanna Benson	Namibia	14.99	SB
				Wind: (−0.3 m/s), (−0.9 m/s)		

== T38 ==
Final

The event took place on 29 September.

Rank	Lane	Name	Nationality	Time	Notes
1st place, gold medalist(s)	7	Angie Mejía	Colombia	12.34	CR
2nd place, silver medalist(s)	5	Karen Palomeque	Colombia	12.36	SB
3rd place, bronze medalist(s)	4	Lida-Maria Manthopoulou	Greece	12.72	SB
4	6	Luca Ekler	Hungary	12.81	SB
5	3	Sophie Hahn	Great Britain	12.88	
6	8	Chen Zimo	China	12.89	
7	2	Rhiannon Clarke	Australia	13.09	
8	9	Lana Sutton	Ireland	13.10	
				Wind: (−0.6 m/s)	

Round 1

The event took place on 28 September. Qualification: First 3 in each heat (Q) and the next 2 fastest (q) advance to the Final

Rank	Heat	Lane	Name	Nationality	Time	Notes
1	1	6	Angie Mejía	Colombia	12.36	Q, CR
2	2	5	Karen Palomeque	Colombia	12.55	Q
3	1	7	Lida-Maria Manthopoulou	Greece	12.74	Q, SB
4	2	4	Luca Ekler	Hungary	12.82	Q, SB
5	2	6	Sophie Hahn	Great Britain	12.82	Q
6	1	4	Chen Zimo	China	12.86	Q, AS
7	1	5	Rhiannon Clarke	Australia	12.99	q
8	2	7	Lana Sutton	Ireland	13.01	q
9	1	3	Olivia Breen	Great Britain	13.21	
10	2	3	Maddie Down	Great Britain	13.26	
				Wind: (+0.1 m/s), (±0.0 m/s)		

== T44 ==
Final

The event took place on 1 October.

Rank	Lane	Name	Nationality	Time	Notes
1st place, gold medalist(s)	5	Victoria Jade Levitt	Great Britain	13.22	
2nd place, silver medalist(s)	6	Annie Carey	United States	13.45	
3rd place, bronze medalist(s)	7	Bebe Jackson	Great Britain	13.63	
4	4	Makayla Elcoate	Australia	14.83	
				Wind: (−0.8 m/s)	

== T47 ==
Final

The event took place on 29 September.

Rank	Lane	Name	Nationality	Time	Notes
1st place, gold medalist(s)	7	Kiara Rodríguez	Ecuador	11.97	SB
2nd place, silver medalist(s)	4	Maria Clara Augusto	Brazil	12.20	PB
3rd place, bronze medalist(s)	6	Marie Ngoussou Ngouyi	France	12.29 (.283)	PB
4	5	Anna Grimaldi	New Zealand	12.29 (.284)	SB
5	3	Brittni Mason	United States	12.38	
6	8	Nanda Mei Sholihah	Indonesia	12.39	AS
7	2	Jule Ross	Germany	12.56	
8	9	Violet Hall	United States	12.62	
				Wind: (−0.6 m/s)	

Round 1

The event took place on 28 September. Qualification: First 2 in each heat (Q) and the next 2 fastest (q) advance to the Final

Rank	Heat	Lane	Name	Nationality	Time	Notes
1	3	2	Kiara Rodríguez	Ecuador	12.10	Q
2	1	2	Marie Ngoussou Ngouyi	France	12.32	Q, PB
3	2	3	Maria Clara Augusto	Brazil	12.33	Q, PB
4	2	6	Anna Grimaldi	New Zealand	12.41	Q
5	3	7	Nanda Mei Sholihah	Indonesia	12.42	Q, AS
6	1	7	Brittni Mason	United States	12.47	Q
7	3	5	Jule Ross	Germany	12.48	q, PB
8	3	8	Violet Hall	United States	12.57	q, PB
9	3	6	Sheriauna Haase	Canada	12.60	SB
10	2	7	Sasirawan Inthachot	Thailand	12.79	SB
11	1	5	Anastasiia Soloveva	Neutral Paralympic Athletes	12.83	
12	1	8	Janani Wickramasingha	Sri Lanka	12.88	PB
13	1	4	Moe Nakagawa	Japan	12.93	
14	2	5	Stency Obonyo	Kenya	12.98	PB
15	2	4	Chloe Dunbar	Canada	13.03	
16	3	4	Ida-Louise Øverland	Norway	13.06	
17	2	2	Lexie Brown	Australia	13.12	SB
18	2	8	Antonina Graca	Poland	13.14	
19	3	3	Yan Jing	China	13.36	
20	1	6	Tereza Jakschová	Czech Republic	13.53	
21	2	9	Ada Boudníková	Czech Republic	13.54	
	1	3	Petra Luterán	Hungary	DNF	
				Wind: (−0.8 m/s), (−1.0 m/s), (−0.9 m/s)		

== T53 ==
Final

The event took place on 2 October.

Rank	Lane	Name	Nationality	Time	Notes
1st place, gold medalist(s)	5	Catherine Debrunner	Switzerland	15.50	CR
2nd place, silver medalist(s)	4	Hamide Doğangün	Turkey	15.96	PB
3rd place, bronze medalist(s)	3	Zhou Hongzhuan	China	16.57	SB
4	6	Gao Fang	China	16.58	SB
5	7	Jessica Cooper Lewis	Bermuda	18.23	
6	8	Sarah James	New Zealand	19.31	
7	9	Gohar Navasardyan	Armenia	32.82	
				Wind: (−0.4 m/s)	

== T54 ==
Final

The event took place on 2 October.

Rank	Lane	Name	Nationality	Time	Notes
1st place, gold medalist(s)	7	Noemi Alphonse	Mauritius	16.07	SB
2nd place, silver medalist(s)	9	Zübeyde Süpürgeci	Turkey	16.19	SB
3rd place, bronze medalist(s)	6	Zhou Zhaoqian	China	16.22	SB
4	4	Hannah Dederick	United States	16.52	
5	5	Léa Bayekula	Belgium	16.63	
6	8	Lucia Montenegro	Argentina	16.86	SB
7	7	Marie Desirella Brandy Perrine	Mauritius	17.24	
8	2	Nandini Sharma	Canada	17.54	
				Wind: (+0.1 m/s)	

Round 1

The event took place on 2 October. Qualification: First 3 in each heat (Q) and the next 2 fastest (q) advance to the Final

Rank	Heat	Lane	Name	Nationality	Time	Notes
1	2	5	Léa Bayekula	Belgium	15.94	Q, CR
2	1	6	Noemi Alphonse	Mauritius	16.11	Q, SB
3	2	6	Hannah Dederick	United States	16.15	Q
4	1	4	Zhou Zhaoqian	China	16.23	Q, SB
5	2	3	Marie Desirella Brandy Perrine	Mauritius	16.30	Q, SB
6	2	7	Zübeyde Süpürgeci	Turkey	16.58	q
7	2	4	Nandini Sharma	Canada	17.28	q
8	1	3	Lucia Montenegro	Argentina	17.31	Q
9	1	7	Anisa Abdulle	Norway	18.39	
	1	5	Amanda Kotaja	Finland	DNS	
				Wind: (−0.1 m/s), (−0.8 m/s)		

== T63 ==
Final

The event took place on 1 October.

Rank	Lane	Name	Nationality	Class	Time	Notes
1st place, gold medalist(s)	7	Ambra Sabatini	Italy	T63	14.39	SB
2nd place, silver medalist(s)	5	Karisma Evi Tiarani	Indonesia	T42	14.65	CR
3rd place, bronze medalist(s)	4	Ndidikama Okoh	Great Britain	T42	14.66	
4	6	Elena Kratter	Switzerland	T63	14.70	
5	8	Noelle Lambert	United States	T63	15.42	
6	3	Lindi Marcusen	United States	T63	15.64	
7	9	Tomomi Tozawa	Japan	T63	15.76	
8	2	Kaede Maegawa	Japan	T63	17.03	
				Wind: (+0.5 m/s)		

== T64 ==
Final

The event took place on 1 October.

Rank	Lane	Name	Nationality	Class	Time	Notes
1st place, gold medalist(s)	6	Fleur Jong	Netherlands	T62	12.29	
2nd place, silver medalist(s)	4	Marlene van Gansewinkel	Netherlands	T64	12.86	
3rd place, bronze medalist(s)	8	Marissa Papaconstantinou	Canada	T64	13.06	
4	7	Kiki Hendriks	Netherlands	T62	13.21	
5	5	Beatriz Hatz	United States	T64	13.28	
6	9	Fiona Pinar Batalla	Spain	T64	13.59	
7	3	Abassia Rahmani	Switzerland	T62	13.72	
8	2	Sydney Barta	United States	T64	13.83	
				Wind: (+0.4 m/s)		

Round 1

The event took place on 1 October. Qualification: First 3 in each heat (Q) and the next 2 fastest (q) advance to the Final

Rank	Heat	Lane	Name	Nationality	Class	Time	Notes
1	1	5	Fleur Jong	Netherlands	T62	12.27	Q, CR
2	2	5	Marlene van Gansewinkel	Netherlands	T64	12.85	Q
3	2	8	Kiki Hendriks	Netherlands	T62	12.96	Q, =PB
4	2	3	Marissa Papaconstantinou	Canada	T64	12.98	Q
5	1	4	Beatriz Hatz	United States	T64	13.24	Q
6	1	8	Abassia Rahmani	Switzerland	T62	13.48	Q
7	2	7	Fiona Pinar Batalla	Spain	T64	13.58	q
8	1	6	Sydney Barta	United States	T64	13.69	q
9	1	7	Yaimillie Marie Diaz Colon	Puerto Rico	T64	13.72	SB
10	2	5	Chloe Chavez	United States	T64	14.10	
11	2	4	Amaris Sofia Vazquez Collazo	Puerto Rico	T64	14.63	PB
				Wind: (+0.2 m/s), (−0.3 m/s)			

== T71 ==
Final

The event took place on 28 September.

Rank	Lane	Name	Nationality	Time	Notes
1st place, gold medalist(s)	7	Thekra Alkaabi	United Arab Emirates	19.89	WR
2nd place, silver medalist(s)	5	Bella Morkus	Lithuania	21.53	
3rd place, bronze medalist(s)	4	Miriam Dominikowska	Poland	23.56	PB
4	6	Anthi Liagkou	Greece	25.66	
5	8	Marika Vaihinger	Sweden	28.89	PB
6	2	Viktorija Žižmaraitė	Lithuania	34.55	PB
7	3	Ani Jelenić	Croatia	36.41	
				Wind: (+1.2 m/s)	

== T72 ==
Final

The event took place on 30 September.

Rank	Lane	Name	Nationality	Time	Notes
1st place, gold medalist(s)	7	Magdalena Andruszkiewicz	Poland	16.82	WR
2nd place, silver medalist(s)	4	Judith Tortosa Vila	Spain	18.16	PB
3rd place, bronze medalist(s)	5	Zofia Kalucka	Poland	19.16	
4	8	Karla Risum	Denmark	19.36	
5	6	Sayers Grooms	United States	20.19	SB
6	3	Edileusa dos Santos	Brazil	20.34	
7	2	Andrea Stokholm Overgaard	Denmark	21.88	
8	9	Kotryna Zizmaraite	Lithuania	23.53	PB
				Wind: (−0.6 m/s)	
