= 2018 World Para Athletics European Championships – Women's 200 metres =

The women's 200 metres at the 2018 World Para Athletics European Championships was held at the Friedrich-Ludwig-Jahn-Sportpark in Berlin from 20 to 26 August. 12 classification finals are held, all over this distance.

== Medalists ==
Event	Gold		Silver		Bronze	
T11	Lia Beel Quintana (ESP) guide: David Alonso Gutierrez	28.56	Joanna Mazur (POL) guide: Michal Stawicki	28.57	Itxaso Munguira (ESP) guide: Aitor Finez Maranon	30.13
T12	Oksana Boturchuk (UKR) guide: Vitali Butrym	25.23	Katrin Mueller-Rottgardt (GER) guide: Alexander Kosenkow	26.47	Małgorzata Ignasiak (POL)	27.30
T13	Leilia Adzhametova (UKR)	24.78 CR	Carolina Duarte (POR)	25.38	Orla Comerford (IRL)	26.76
T35	Jagoda Kibil (POL)	32.04	Nienke Timmer (NED)	34.79	Valeriia Yanhol (UKR)	35.12
T36	Nicole Nicoleitzik (GER)	31.87	Yelyzaveta Henkina (UKR)	33.17	no medal awarded	
T37	Mandy Francois-Elie (FRA)	27.86 CR	Manon Genest (FRA)	30.33	Bergrun Osk Adalsteinsdottir (ISL)	31.61
T38	Sophie Hahn (GBR)	26.51 CR	Lindy Ave (GER)	27.24	Luca Ekler (HUN)	27.92
T47	Angelina Lanza (FRA)	26.31	Alicja Jeromin (POL)	26.61	Tereza Jakschova (CZE)	27.32
T53	Hamide Kurt (TUR)	31.59 CR	Zeynep Acet (TUR)	35.78	Tanja Henseler (SUI)	36.51
T54	Zubeyde Supurgeci (TUR)	30.96 CR	Alexandra Helbling (SUI)	31.30	Amanda Kotaja (FIN)	31.62
T62	Abassia Rahmani (SUI)	29.32	no medals awarded			
T64	Marlene van Gansewinkel (NED)	26.12	Irmgard Bensusan (GER)	26.84 CR	Laura Sugar (GBR)	28.03
WR world record | AR area record | CR championship record | GR games record | NR national record | OR Olympic record | PB personal best | SB season best | WL world leading (in a given season)

== See also ==
- List of IPC world records in athletics
