= Athletics at the 2020 Summer Paralympics – Women's 200 metres T64 =

Women's 200 metres T64 at the XVI Paralympic Games
- Venue: Tokyo National Stadium
- Dates: 31 August 2021 (final)
- Competitors: 10 from 6 nations
- Winning time: 26.22

Medalists
1st place, gold medalist(s)		Marlene van Gansewinkel	Netherlands
2nd place, silver medalist(s)		Irmgard Bensusan	Germany
3rd place, bronze medalist(s)		Kimberly Alkemade	Netherlands

The women's 200 metres T64 event at the 2020 Summer Paralympics in Tokyo, took place on 31 August 2021.

== Records ==
Prior to the competition, the existing records were as follows:

World Record	Record Mark	26.12	Bonn, Germany	1 January 2019
Paralympic Record	Vacant	–		

Area	Time	Athlete	Nation
Africa	Vacant		
America	27.10	April Holmes	United States
Asia	28.77	Saki Takakuwa	Japan
Europe	26.12 WR	Record Mark	
Oceania	30.33	Anna Steven	New Zealand

== Results ==
=== Heats ===
Heat 1 took place on 31 August 2021, at 10:00:

Rank	Lane	Name	Nationality	Class	Time	Notes
1	5	Marlene van Gansewinkel	Netherlands	T64	26.56	Q, SB
2	3	Marissa Papaconstantinou	Canada	T64	27.22	Q, PB
3	6	Maria Tietze	Germany	T64	27.77	Q, PB
4	7	Femita Ayanbeku	United States	T64	28.64	
5	4	Yaimillie Marie Díaz Colon	Puerto Rico	T64	31.79	PB

Heat 2 took place on 31 August 2021, at 10:06:

Rank	Lane	Name	Nationality	Class	Time	Notes
1	5	Irmgard Bensusan	Germany	T44	26.41	Q, GR
2	3	Kimberly Alkemade	Netherlands	T64	26.65	Q, PB
3	4	Sydney Barta	United States	T64	26.87	Q, AR
4	6	Beatriz Hatz	United States	T64	27.39	q
5	7	Anna Steven	New Zealand	T64	28.60	q, AR

=== Final ===
The final took place on 31 August 2021, at 19:52:

Rank	Lane	Name	Nationality	Class	Time	Notes
1st place, gold medalist(s)	6	Marlene van Gansewinkel	Netherlands	T64	26.22	PR
2nd place, silver medalist(s)	7	Irmgard Bensusan	Germany	T44	26.58	
3rd place, bronze medalist(s)	4	Kimberly Alkemade	Netherlands	T64	26.80	
4	8	Sydney Barta	United States	T64	27.00	
5	5	Marissa Papaconstantinou	Canada	T64	27.08	PB
6	3	Beatriz Hatz	United States	T64	27.18	
7	9	Maria Tietze	Germany	T64	28.22	
8	2	Anna Steven	New Zealand	T64	28.88	
