= Athletics at the 2016 Summer Paralympics – Women's 100 metres T44 =

Women's 100 metres T44 at the XV Paralympic Games
- Venue: Estádio Olímpico João Havelange
- Dates: heats_date–17 September 2016
- Competitors: 18 from 11 nations

Medalists
1st place, gold medalist(s)		Marlou van Rhijn	Netherlands
2nd place, silver medalist(s)		Irmgard Bensusan	Germany
3rd place, bronze medalist(s)		Nyoshia Cain	Trinidad and Tobago

The T44 category is for athletes who have a single below knee amputation or who can walk with moderately reduced function in one or both legs.

The Athletics at the 2016 Summer Paralympics – Women's 100 metres T44 event at the 2016 Paralympic Games took place on 17 September 2016, at the Estádio Olímpico João Havelange.

== Heats ==
=== Heat 1 ===
12:24 17 September 2016:

Rank	Lane	Bib	Name	Nationality	Reaction	Time	Notes
1	3	359	Irmgard Bensusan	Germany		13.08	Q
2	6	616	Marlene van Gansewinkel	Netherlands		13.38	Q
3	4	144	Marissa Papaconstantinou	Canada		13.65	
4	7	900	April Holmes	United States		13.69	
5	8	779	Abassia Rahmani	Switzerland		13.71	
6	5	271	Sara Andres Barrio	Spain		14.06	

=== Heat 2 ===
12:30 17 September 2016:

Rank	Lane	Bib	Name	Nationality	Reaction	Time	Notes
1	3	618	Marlou van Rhijn	Netherlands		13.31	Q
2	6	818	Nyoshia Cain	Trinidad and Tobago		13.32	Q
3	7	345	Laura Sugar	Great Britain		13.59	q
4	4	890	Femita Ayanebeku	United States		13.76	
5	8	471	Maya Nakanishi	Japan		14.40	
6	5	453	Giuseppina Versace	Italy		14.42	

=== Heat 3 ===
12:36 17 September 2016:

Rank	Lane	Bib	Name	Nationality	Reaction	Time	Notes
1	5	336	Sophie Kamlish	Great Britain		12.93	Q
2	6	308	Marie-Amelie le Fur	France		13.27	Q
3	4	476	Saki Takakuwa	Japan		13.43	q
4	3	612	Fleur Jong	Netherlands		13.92	
5	7	452	Federica Maspero	Italy		14.37	
6	8	918	Liz Willis	United States		14.43	

== Final ==
20:34 17 September 2016:

Rank	Lane	Bib	Name	Nationality	Reaction	Time	Notes
1st place, gold medalist(s)	6	618	Marlou van Rhijn	Netherlands		13.02	
2nd place, silver medalist(s)	4	359	Irmgard Bensusan	Germany		13.04	
3rd place, bronze medalist(s)	9	818	Nyoshia Cain	Trinidad and Tobago		13.10	
4	5	336	Sophie Kamlish	Great Britain		13.16	
5	3	345	Laura Sugar	Great Britain		13.37	
6	7	308	Marie-Amelie le Fur	France		13.40	
7	8	616	Marlene van Gansewinkel	Netherlands		13.64	
8	2	476	Saki Takakuwa	Japan		13.65	
