= 2018 World Para Athletics European Championships – Women's 100 metres =

The women's 100 metres at the 2018 World Para Athletics European Championships was held at the Friedrich-Ludwig-Jahn-Sportpark in Berlin from 20–26 August. RaceRunning events (running events involving adapted tricycle frames for athletes with severe balance difficulties) were included for the first time as RR1 and RR3 events. 15 classification finals are held in all over this distance.

== Medalists ==
Event	Gold		Silver		Bronze	
T11	Ronja Oja (FIN) guide :Jesper Oja	13.68	Lia Beel Quintana (ESP) guide :David Gutierrez	13.83	Joanna Mazur (POL) guide :Michal Stawiki	14.40
T12	Katrin Mueller-Rottgardt (GER) guide :Alexander Kosenkow	12.76	Melani Berges Gamez (ESP) guide :Sergio Palancar Sanchez	13.11	Małgorzata Ignasiak (POL)	13.26
T13	Leilia Adzhametova (UKR)	11.93 CR	Carolina Duarte (POR)	12.59	Orla Comerford (IRL)	12.82
RR1	Marika Vaihinger (SWE)	31.26	Marte Aasvang (NOR)	32.61	no medal awarded	
RR3 (open to RR2 athletes)	Hannah Dines (GBR)	19.00	Kayleigh Haggo (GBR)	19.46	Manja Hansen (DEN)	20.48
T34	Kare Adenegan (GBR)	17.38	Hannah Cockroft (GBR)	17.95	Joyce Lefevre (BEL)	20.33
T35	Maria Lyle (GBR)	15.32	Nienke Timmer (NED)	16.05	Valeriia Yanhol (UKR)	16.32
T36	Nicole Nicoleitzik (GER)	15.60	no medals awarded			
T37	Mandy François-Elie (FRA)	13.29	Nataliia Kobzar (UKR)	13.67	Bergrun Osk Adalsteinsdottir (ISL)	14.73
T38	Sophie Hahn (GBR)	12.52 CR	Lindy Ave (GER)	13.21	Olivia Breen (GBR)	13.30
T47	Alicja Jeromin (POL)	13.02	Tereza Jakschová (CZE)	13.19	Polly Maton (GBR)	13.45
T53	Tanja Henseler (SUI)	19.60	Anita Scherrer (SUI)	20.64	no medal awarded due to non-starters	
T54	Amanda Kotaja (FIN)	17.08	Zubeyde Supurgeci (TUR)	17.16	Alexandra Helbling (SUI)	17.89
T63	Martina Caironi (ITA)	14.91 CR	Monica Contrafatto (ITA)	15.61	Gitte Haenen (BEL)	16.07
T64	Marlene van Gansewinkel (NED)	12.85 WR	Irmgard Bensusan (GER)	13.09 CR	Laura Sugar (GBR)	13.63
WR world record | AR area record | CR championship record | GR games record | NR national record | OR Olympic record | PB personal best | SB season best | WL world leading (in a given season)

== See also ==
- List of IPC world records in athletics
