= Athletics at the 2024 Summer Paralympics – Women's 200 metres T64 =

Women's 200 metres T64 at the XVII Paralympic Games
- Venue: Stade de France, Paris, France
- Dates: 3 September 2024
- Competitors: 11 from 7 nations
- Winning time: 25.42 PR

Medalists
1st place, gold medalist(s)		Kimberly Alkemade	Netherlands
2nd place, silver medalist(s)		Marlene van Gansewinkel	Netherlands
3rd place, bronze medalist(s)		Irmgard Bensusan	Germany

200 metres at the 2024 Summer Paralympics
Men · T35 · T37 · T51 · T64
Women · T11 · T12 · T35 · T36 · T37 · T47 · T64

The Women's 200 metres T64 at the 2024 Summer Paralympics took place on 3 September at the Stade de France in Paris. This event includes T44 athletes.

The T44 category is for athletes who have a single below knee amputation or who can walk with moderately reduced function in one or both legs.

== Records ==
T44
World Record	Irmgard Bensusan (GER)	26.15	(Germany) Leverkusen	21 June 2019
Paralympic Record	Irmgard Bensusan (GER)	26.41	(Japan) Tokyo	31 August 2021

Area	Time	Athlete	Location	Date
Africa				
America				
Asia				
Europe				
Oceania				

T64
World Record	Kimberly Alkemade (NED)	25.29	(France) Paris	14 June 2024
Paralympic Record	Marlene van Gansewinkel (NED)	26.22	(Japan) Tokyo	31 August 2021

Area	Time	Athlete	Location	Date
Africa				
America				
Asia				
Europe				
Oceania				

== Classification ==
The event features both T44 and T64 classified athletes. T44 athletes have mild limb loss, muscle weakness or restrictions in the legs who don't use any prosthetics. T64 athletes have an absence of one leg below the knee and use a prosthetic running leg.

== Results ==
=== Heats ===
The Heats were held on 3 September, starting at 10:36 (UTC+2) in the morning session. First 3 in each heat (Q) and the next 2 fastest (q) advance to the final

=== Heat 1 ===
Rank	Lane	Class	Athlete	Nation	Time	Notes
1	5	T64	Marlene van Gansewinkel	Netherlands	26.36	Q
2	7	T64	Fiona Pinar Batalla	Spain	27.42	Q, PB
3	8	T64	Marissa Papaconstantinou	Canada	27.47	Q
4	4	T64	Beatriz Hatz	United States	27.86	q
5	6	T44	Tezna Kirstin Abrahams	South Africa	31.17	PB
6	3	T64	Amaris Sofia Vazquez Collazo	Puerto Rico	33.02	SB
Source:					Wind: -1.2 m/s	

=== Heat 2 ===
Rank	Lane	Class	Athlete	Nation	Time	Notes
1	5	T64	Kimberly Alkemade	Netherlands	26.31	Q
2	7	T44	Irmgard Bensusan	Germany	27.41	Q
3	6	T44	Annie Carey	United States	27.87	Q, AR
4	4	T64	Anna Steven	New Zealand	29.13	q, SB
5	8	T64	Yaimillie Marie Diaz Colon	Puerto Rico	29.55	
Source:					Wind:-0.6 m/s	

=== Final ===
The final took place on 3 September, starting at 19:53 (UTC+2) in the evening.

Rank	Lane	Class	Athlete	Nation	Time	Notes
1st place, gold medalist(s)	8	T64	Kimberly Alkemade	Netherlands	25.42	PR
2nd place, silver medalist(s)	6	T64	Marlene van Gansewinkel	Netherlands	26.14	
3rd place, bronze medalist(s)	7	T44	Irmgard Bensusan	Germany	26.77	SB
4	9	T64	Marissa Papaconstantinou	Canada	27.30	
5	3	T64	Beatriz Hatz	United States	27.45	
6	5	T44	Annie Carey	United States	27.62	AR
7	4	T64	Fiona Pinar Batalla	Spain	27.87	
8	2	T64	Anna Steven	New Zealand	29.37	
Source:					Wind: +0.5 m/s	
