= Athletics at the 2016 Summer Paralympics – Women's 200 metres T44 =

Women's 200 metres T44 at the XV Paralympic Games
- Venue: Estádio Olímpico João Havelange
- Dates: 15 September 2016
- Competitors: 15 from 11 nations

Medalists
1st place, gold medalist(s)		Marlou van Rhijn	Netherlands
2nd place, silver medalist(s)		Irmgard Bensusan	Germany
3rd place, bronze medalist(s)		Marie-Amelie le Fur	France

The T44 category is for athletes who have a single below knee amputation or who can walk with moderately reduced function in one or both legs.

The Athletics at the 2016 Summer Paralympics – Women's 200 metres T44 event at the 2016 Paralympic Games took place on 15 September 2016, at the Estádio Olímpico João Havelange.

== Heats ==
=== Heat 1 ===
19:38 14 September 2016:

Rank	Lane	Bib	Name	Nationality	Reaction	Time	Notes
1	5	359	Irmgard Bensusan	Germany		26.70	Q
2	8	308	Marie-Amelie le Fur	France		26.97	Q
3	1	345	Laura Sugar	Great Britain		28.04	Q
4	6	271	Sara Andres Barrio	Spain		28.80	
5	4	452	Federica Maspero	Italy		29.04	
6	2	612	Fleur Jong	Netherlands		29.15	
	3	900	April Holmes	United States			DSQ
	7	818	Nyoshia Cain	Trinidad and Tobago			DSQ

=== Heat 2 ===
19:45 14 September 2016:

Rank	Lane	Bib	Name	Nationality	Reaction	Time	Notes
1	8	618	Marlou van Rhijn	Netherlands		26.69	Q
2	3	779	Abassia Rahmani	Switzerland		27.89	Q
3	5	453	Giuseppina Versace	Italy		28.13	Q
4	4	890	Femita Ayanebeku	United States		28.58	q
5	7	476	Saki Takakuwa	Japan		28.77	q
6	2	918	Liz Willis	United States		29.67	
	6	144	Marissa Papaconstantinou	Canada			DSQ

== Final ==
17:45 15 September 2016:

Rank	Lane	Bib	Name	Nationality	Reaction	Time	Notes
1st place, gold medalist(s)	5	618	Marlou van Rhijn	Netherlands		26.16	
2nd place, silver medalist(s)	6	359	Irmgard Bensusan	Germany		26.90	
3rd place, bronze medalist(s)	4	308	Marie-Amelie le Fur	France		27.11	
4	3	779	Abassia Rahmani	Switzerland		27.84	
5	7	345	Laura Sugar	Great Britain		28.31	
6	1	890	Femita Ayanebeku	United States		28.81	
7	2	476	Saki Takakuwa	Japan		28.88	
8	8	453	Giuseppina Versace	Italy		28.90	
