= 2025 World Para Athletics Championships – Women's 200 metres =

The women's 200 metres events at the 2025 World Para Athletics Championships were held at the Jawaharlal Nehru Stadium, Delhi in New Delhi.

== Medalists ==
Event	Gold	Silver	Bronze
T11	Jerusa Geber; Brazil	Liu Yiming; China	Thalita Simplício; Brazil
T12	Clara Daniele Barros da Silva; Brazil	Simran Sharma; India	Shen Yaqin; China
T13	Orla Comerford; Ireland	Rayane Soares da Silva; Brazil	Kym Crosby; United States
T35	Guo Qianqian; China	Fatimah Suwaed; Iraq	Preethi Pal; India
T36	Danielle Aitchison; New Zealand	Mali Lovell; Australia	Cheyenne Bouthoorn; Netherlands
T37	Wen Xiaoyan; China	Nataliia Kobzar; Ukraine	Taylor Swanson; United States
T38	Karen Palomeque; Colombia	Angie Mejía; Colombia	Luca Ekler; Hungary
T44	Annie Carey; United States	Victoria Levitt; Great Britain	—N/a
T47	Kiara Rodríguez; Ecuador	Maria Clara Augusto; Brazil	Anna Grimaldi; New Zealand
T64	Marlene van Gansewinkel; Netherlands	Marissa Papaconstantinou; Canada	Sydney Barta; United States

== T11 ==
Final

The event took place on 4 October.

Rank	Lane	Name	Nationality	Time	Notes
1st place, gold medalist(s)	3	Jerusa Geber dos Santos	Brazil	24.88	SB
2nd place, silver medalist(s)	7	Liu Yiming	China	25.54	
3rd place, bronze medalist(s)	5	Thalita Simplício	Brazil	25.97	
4	1	Juliana Ngleya Moko	Angola	25.98	PB
				Wind: (−0.1 m/s)	

Round 1

The event took place on 4 October. Qualification: First 1 in each heat (Q) and the next 2 fastest (q) advance to the Final

Rank	Heat	Lane	Name	Nationality	Time	Notes
1	1	7	Jerusa Geber dos Santos	Brazil	25.19	Q, SB
2	2	3	Liu Yiming	China	25.55	q
3	2	1	Juliana Ngleya Moko	Angola	26.07	q, PB
4	1	7	Thalita Simplício	Brazil	26.51	Q
5	1	5	Regina Josefina Vieira Dumbo	Angola	26.93	PB
6	1	1	Melissa Baldera	Peru	28.21	
7	2	5	Julie Anndora Asaun	Mauritius	31.29	
	1	3	Linda Patricia Pérez López	Venezuela	DNS	
				Wind: (−1.4 m/s), (+0.2 m/s)		

== T12 ==
Final

The event took place on 5 October.

Rank	Lane	Name	Nationality	Time	Notes
1st place, gold medalist(s)	3	Clara Daniele Barros da Silva	Brazil	24.42	PB
2nd place, silver medalist(s)	5	Simran	India	24.46	AS
3rd place, bronze medalist(s)	1	Shen Yaqin	China	25.30	
	7	Alejandra Paola Pérez López	Venezuela	DQ	
				Wind: (+0.7 m/s)	

Semifinals

The event took place on 5 October. Qualification: First 1 in each heat (Q) and the next 2 fastest (q) advance to the Final

Rank	Heat	Lane	Name	Nationality	Time	Notes
1	2	3	Clara Daniele Barros da Silva	Brazil	24.45	Q, PB
2	2	5	Alejandra Paola Pérez López	Venezuela	24.52	q, SB
3	1	5	Simran	India	24.92	Q, SB
4	2	7	Shen Yaqin	China	25.09	q, PB
5	1	3	Hajar Safarzadeh	Iran	25.21	
6	1	7	Nagore Folgado García	Spain	25.32	
7	2	1	Manuela Jacinto	Dominican Republic	26.03	
	1	1	Lorraine Gomes de Aguiar	Brazil	DNS	
				Wind: (−0.7 m/s), (+0.7 m/s)		

Round 1

The event took place on 4 October. Qualification: First 1 in each heat (Q) and the next 4 fastest (q) advance to the Semi-Final

Rank	Heat	Lane	Name	Nationality	Time	Notes
1	1	5	Alejandra Paola Pérez López	Venezuela	24.84	Q, SB
2	3	7	Clara Daniele Barros da Silva	Brazil	24.97	Q
3	2	5	Hajar Safarzadeh	Iran	24.97	Q, SB
4	4	7	Simran	India	25.03	Q, SB
5	1	7	Shen Yaqin	China	25.20	q, PB
6	3	5	Nagore Folgado García	Spain	25.69	q
7	2	7	Lorraine Gomes de Aguiar	Brazil	25.69	q
8	1	3	Manuela Jacinto	Dominican Republic	26.13	q
9	4	3	Darlenys de la Cruz Severino	Dominican Republic	26.24	SB
10	3	3	Anna Kulinich-Sorokina	Neutral Paralympic Athletes	26.42	SB
11	2	1	Lahja Ipinge	Namibia	26.73	SB
12	2	3	Iida Lounela	Finland	28.23	
13	3	1	Evelina-Cristina Cretu	Moldova	30.80	SB
14	4	5	Ni Made Arianti Putri	Indonesia	31.65	
	4	1	Daniele Jesus dos Santos	Brazil	DNS	
				Wind: (−0.1 m/s), (+0.5 m/s), (−0.3 m/s), (+0.6 m/s)		

== T13 ==
Final

The event took place on 30 September.

Rank	Lane	Name	Nationality	Time	Notes
1st place, gold medalist(s)	8	Orla Comerford	Ireland	24.71	
2nd place, silver medalist(s)	7	Rayane Soares da Silva	Brazil	25.24	
3rd place, bronze medalist(s)	6	Kym Crosby	United States	25.64	
4	9	Mariia Ulianenko	Neutral Paralympic Athletes	26.31	PB
5	4	Zara Temmink	Netherlands	27.08	
6	2	Olga Drozdova	Neutral Paralympic Athletes	27.76	PB
7	3	Melissa Calvo	Costa Rica	27.82	PB
	5	Adiaratou Iglesias Forneiro	Spain	DNS	
				Wind: (−0.9 m/s)	

== T35 ==
Final

The event took place on 3 October.

Rank	Lane	Name	Nationality	Time	Notes
1st place, gold medalist(s)	7	Guo Qianqian	China	29.50	SB
2nd place, silver medalist(s)	8	Fatimah Suwaed	Iraq	30.00	PB
3rd place, bronze medalist(s)	6	Preethi Pal	India	30.03	SB
4	5	Ingrid Renecka	Poland	31.77	SB
5	4	Mariia Koloboba	Neutral Paralympic Athletes	34.04	
6	9	Ellen Westling	Sweden	37.88	
				Wind: (+0.9 m/s)	

== T36 ==
Final

The event took place on 3 October.

Rank	Lane	Name	Nationality	Time	Notes
1st place, gold medalist(s)	8	Danielle Aitchison	New Zealand	27.18	WR
2nd place, silver medalist(s)	6	Mali Lovell	Australia	29.69	
3rd place, bronze medalist(s)	5	Cheyenne Bouthoorn	Netherlands	30.62	SB
4	9	Jeon Min-jae	South Korea	30.95	SB
5	7	Araceli Rotela	Argentina	31.45	
6	4	Verônica Hipólito	Brazil	32.23	
7	3	Yam Kwok Fan	Hong Kong	33.81	SB
	2	Abby Craswell	Australia	DNS	
				Wind: (+1.0 m/s)	

== T37 ==
Final

The event took place on 5 October.

Rank	Lane	Name	Nationality	Time	Notes
1st place, gold medalist(s)	8	Wen Xiaoyan	China	26.70	SB
2nd place, silver medalist(s)	7	Nataliia Kobzar	Ukraine	27.34	=PB
3rd place, bronze medalist(s)	4	Taylor Swanson	United States	28.22	
4	6	Viktoriia Slanova	Neutral Paralympic Athletes	28.50	SB
5	9	Akeesha Snowden	Australia	28.77	
6	5	Liezel Gouws	South Africa	29.50	PB
7	3	Yescarly Medina	Venezuela	30.05	SB
8	2	Johanna Benson	Namibia	31.00	
				Wind: (±0.0 m/s)	

Round 1

The event took place on 5 October. Qualification: First 3 in each heat (Q) and the next 2 fastest (q) advance to the Final

Rank	Heat	Lane	Name	Nationality	Time	Notes
1	1	8	Wen Xiaoyan	China	27.75	Q
2	2	8	Nataliia Kobzar	Ukraine	27.79	Q, SB
3	1	7	Viktoriia Slanova	Neutral Paralympic Athletes	28.75	Q
4	1	6	Akeesha Snowden	Australia	29.04	Q
5	2	7	Taylor Swanson	United States	29.32	Q
6	2	6	Liezel Gouws	South Africa	29.51	Q, PB
7	1	5	Yescarly Medina	Venezuela	30.23	q
8	2	9	Johanna Benson	Namibia	30.50	q, SB
9	2	5	Selma Van Kerm	Belgium	33.64	SB
	1	9	Anais Angeline	Mauritius	DNS	
				Wind: (+2.3 m/s), (+1.1 m/s)		

== T38 ==
Final

The event took place on 2 October.

Rank	Lane	Name	Nationality	Time	Notes
1st place, gold medalist(s)	8	Karen Palomeque	Colombia	24.98	WR
2nd place, silver medalist(s)	6	Angie Mejía	Colombia	25.47	PB
3rd place, bronze medalist(s)	9	Luca Ekler	Hungary	25.96	SB
4	7	Lida-Maria Manthopoulou	Greece	26.20	PB
5	2	Lindy Ave	Germany	26.77	PB
6	5	Lana Sutton	Ireland	26.77	PB
7	3	Margarita Goncharova	Neutral Paralympic Athletes	27.03	
8	4	Sophie Hahn	Great Britain	27.11	
				Wind: (+0.2 m/s)	

Round 1

The event took place on 1 October. Qualification: First 3 in each heat (Q) and the next 2 fastest (q) advance to the Final

Rank	Heat	Lane	Name	Nationality	Time	Notes
1	1	6	Karen Palomeque	Colombia	26.03	Q
2	2	8	Lida-Maria Manthopoulou	Greece	26.31	Q, PB
3	2	4	Angie Mejía	Colombia	26.37	Q, PB
4	2	9	Luca Ekler	Hungary	26.47	Q
5	1	7	Lana Sutton	Ireland	26.78	Q, PB
6	2	6	Lindy Ave	Germany	26.80	q, PB
7	2	5	Margarita Goncharova	Neutral Paralympic Athletes	26.83	q, SB
8	1	4	Sophie Hahn	Great Britain	27.04	Q, SB
9	1	8	Rhiannon Clarke	Australia	27.13	
10	1	5	Briseis Brittain	Australia	27.51	PB
11	2	7	Layla Sharp	Australia	28.51	PB
12	1	9	Ericka Violeta Esteban Villatoro	Guatemala	31.69	
				Wind: (−0.4 m/s), (+0.1 m/s)		

== T44 ==
Final

The event took place on 5 October.

Rank	Lane	Name	Nationality	Time	Notes
1st place, gold medalist(s)	7	Annie Carey	United States	27.31	AM
2nd place, silver medalist(s)	8	Victoria Jade Levitt	Great Britain	27.46	PB
3	6	Bebe Jackson	Great Britain	28.19	PB
				Wind: (+0.6 m/s)	

== T47 ==
Final

The event took place on 4 October.

Rank	Lane	Name	Nationality	Time	Notes
1st place, gold medalist(s)	7	Kiara Rodríguez	Ecuador	24.34	WR
2nd place, silver medalist(s)	8	Maria Clara Augusto	Brazil	24.77	PB
3rd place, bronze medalist(s)	5	Anna Grimaldi	New Zealand	24.82	SB
4	6	Marie Ngoussou Ngouyi	France	25.37	
5	3	Violet Hall	United States	25.51	
5	9	Kerragan Johnson	United States	25.59	
7	4	Jule Ross	Germany	25.86	
8	2	Sheriauna Haase	Canada	26.19	
				Wind: (+0.2 m/s)	

Semifinals

The event took place on 3 October. Qualification: First 3 in each heat (Q) and the next 2 fastest (q) advance to the Final

Rank	Heat	Lane	Name	Nationality	Time	Notes
1	1	7	Kiara Rodríguez	Ecuador	24.41	Q
2	2	7	Maria Clara Augusto	Brazil	24.97	Q, PB
3	1	8	Marie Ngoussou Ngouyi	France	25.18	Q, PB
4	2	6	Anna Grimaldi	New Zealand	25.30	Q, SB
5	2	8	Kerragan Johnson	United States	25.50	Q, PB
5	2	4	Violet Hall	United States	25.50	q, PB
7	1	9	Jule Ross	Germany	25.80	Q, PB
8	1	2	Sheriauna Haase	Canada	25.69	q, SB
9	1	3	Brittni Mason	United States	25.90	
10	2	9	Sasirawan Inthachot	Thailand	25.94	SB
11	2	5	Chloe Dunbar	Canada	26.29	
12	2	3	Stency Obonyo	Kenya	26.61	PB
13	1	4	Fernanda Yara da Silva	Brazil	26.95	
14	1	5	Maria Lara	Chile	27.41	
	2	2	Nanda Mei Sholihah	Indonesia	DNS	
	1	6	Bjørk Nørremark	Denmark	DNS	
				Wind: (+1.5 m/s), (+1.4 m/s)		

Round 1

The event took place on 3 October. Qualification: First 3 in each heat (Q) and the next 4 fastest (q) advance to the Semi-Final

Rank	Heat	Lane	Name	Nationality	Time	Notes
1	2	7	Kiara Rodríguez	Ecuador	24.37	Q, WR
2	3	8	Maria Clara Augusto	Brazil	25.00	Q, PB
3	3	4	Marie Ngoussou Ngouyi	France	25.63	Q, PB
4	2	9	Kerragan Johnson	United States	25.67	Q, PB
5	1	9	Anna Grimaldi	New Zealand	25.76	Q
6	2	6	Jule Ross	Germany	25.80	Q, PB
7	2	8	Nanda Mei Sholihah	Indonesia	25.87	q, PB
8	3	6	Sasirawan Inthachot	Thailand	25.95	Q, SB
9	2	3	Sheriauna Haase	Canada	26.15	q
10	3	7	Brittni Mason	United States	26.19	q
11	1	5	Violet Hall	United States	26.26	Q
12	4	8	Bjørk Nørremark	Denmark	26.69	Q
13	3	5	Stency Obonyo	Kenya	26.73	q, PB
14	3	9	Amanda Cerna	Chile	26.82	
15	3	3	Lexie Brown	Australia	26.87	PB
16	4	9	Fernanda Yara da Silva	Brazil	26.92	Q
17	4	7	Chloe Dunbar	Canada	26.93	Q
18	1	8	Maria Lara	Chile	27.22	Q
19	2	4	Agata Galan	Poland	27.43	
20	1	7	Antonina Graca	Poland	27.57	PB
21	4	4	Yan Jing	China	27.78	
22	1	4	Tereza Jakschová	Czech Republic	28.10	SB
23	2	5	Ada Boudníková	Czech Republic	28.28	
	4	5	Petra Luterán	Hungary	DNF	
	4	6	Ida-Louise Øverland	Norway	DNS	
	1	6	Anastasiia Soloveva	Neutral Paralympic Athletes	DNS	
				Wind: (−0.5 m/s), (±0.0 m/s), (−0.1 m/s), (−0.7 m/s)		

== T64 ==
Final

The event took place on 5 October.

Rank	Lane	Name	Nationality	Time	Notes
1st place, gold medalist(s)	8	Marlene van Gansewinkel	Netherlands	26.16	SB
2nd place, silver medalist(s)	4	Marissa Papaconstantinou	Canada	27.07	
3rd place, bronze medalist(s)	7	Sydney Barta	United States	27.51	
4	6	Fiona Pinar Batalla	Spain	28.22	
5	5	Yaimillie Díaz Colón	Puerto Rico	28.32	PB
6	9	Chloe Chavez	United States	28.86	
7	3	Giuliana Chiara Filippi	Italy	29.13	PB
				Wind: (−0.2 m/s)	
