= Bebe Jackson =

British Paralympic athlete (born 2005)

Personal information
- Born: 3 December 2005 (age 20)
- Home town: Harlow

Sport
- Country: Great Britain
- Sport: Para athletics
- Disability: Clubfoot
- Disability class: T44
- Event: 100m/200m
- Club: Woodford Green and Essex ladies
- Coached by: Alan James
Medal record
Paralympic athletics
Representing Great Britain
World Championships
Bronze medal – third place	2025 New Delhi	100m T44
Commonwealth Youth Games
Silver medal – second place	2023 Port of Spain	Discus F42-44/F61-64

Bebe Jackson (born 3 December 2005) is an English Paralympic athlete who competes in T44 sprinting events at international track and field competitions.

== Early life ==
Jackson was born with clubfoot. She had been cared for by Mick and Pauline Davis, both foster carers, in whom she called "Nanna and Grandad".

== Career ==
Jackson competed in the 2023 Commonwealth Youth Games and won the silver medal in the Discus F42-44/F61-64, becoming the first English female para-athlete to win a medal at the Games.

Making her international debut, Jackson competed in the 2025 World Para Athletics Championships held in New Delhi, where she won the bronze medal in the 100m T44 event, finishing behind teammate Victoria Levitt and Annie Carey of the United States. She also finished third in the 200m T44 event, finishing behind Levitt and Carey but was not awarded the bronze medal because the race had only three competitors.
