= Kałucka =

Kałucka is a Polish surname. Notable people with the surname include:

- Aleksandra Kałucka (born 2001), Polish speed climber
- Natalia Kałucka (born 2001), Polish speed climber
- Zofia Kałucka (born 2002), Polish para-athlete
