= 2021 World Para Athletics European Championships – Women's 100 metres =

The women's 100 metres events were held on each day of the 2021 World Para Athletics European Championships in Bydgoszcz, Poland.

== Medalists ==
| Event | Gold | | Silver | | Bronze | |
|---|---|---|---|---|---|---|
| T11 | Yuliia Pavlenko (UKR); Guide: Viacheslav Ponka | 13.31 | Arjola Dedaj (ITA); Guide: Andrea Rigobello | 13.45 | Delya Boulaghlem (FRA); Guide: Farah Clerc | 13.59 |
| T12 | Nagore Folgado García (ESP); Guide: Joan Raga Varo | 12.72 | Alba García Falagán (ESP); Guide: Jonatan Orozco Moreno | 12.96 | Sara Araújo (POR); Guide: Mariana Duarte Costa | 14.10 |
| T13 | Adiaratou Iglesias Forneiro (ESP) | 12.08 | Leilia Adzhametova (UKR) | 12.24 | Janne Sophie Engeleiter (GER) | 13.03 |
| RR1 | Miriam Dominikowska (POL) | 23.59 PB | Not awarded | | Not awarded | |
| RR3 | Kayleigh Haggo (GBR) | 18.11 PB | Thea Berggren Joergensen (DEN) | 19.41 PB | Zofia Kalucka (POL) | 20.19 |
| T34 | Fabienne André (GBR) | 18.94 PB | Veronika Doronina (RUS) | 19.50 | Amy Siemons (NED) | 19.69 |
| T35 | Maria Lyle (GBR) | 14.39 CR | Nienke Timmer (NED) | 15.60 | Jagoda Kibil (POL) | 16.12 |
| T36 | Cheyenne Bouthoorn (NED) | 14.86 PB | Nicole Nicoleitzik (GER) | 15.01 SB | Yelyzaveta Henkina (UKR) | 15.01 |
| T37 | Mandy François-Elie (FRA) | 13.25 CR | Nataliia Kobzar (UKR) | 13.37 PB | Viktoriia Slanova (RUS) | 13.66 PB |
| T38 | Sophie Hahn (GBR) | 12.58 | Luca Ekler (HUN) | 12.80 PB | Margarita Goncharova (RUS) | 12.99 PB |
| T47 | Saška Sokolov (SRB) | 12.25 ER | Alicja Jeromin (POL) | 12.29 PB | Anastasiia Soloveva (RUS) | 12.52 PB |
| T53 | Catherine Debrunner (SUI) | 17.26 CR | Hamide Kurt Doğangün (TUR) | 18.61 | Zeynep Acet (TUR) | 19.24 |
| T54 | Zübeyde Süpürgeci (TUR) | 16.83 CR | Merle Menje (GER) | 17.16 | Léa Bayekula (BEL) | 17.46 SB |
| T63 | Martina Caironi (ITA) | 15.01 | Elena Kratter (SUI) | 15.94 PB | Sofia Gonzalez (SUI) | 16.50 SB |
| T64 | Fleur Jong (NED) | 12.64 WR | Marlene van Gansewinkel (NED) | 12.80 CR | Sara Andrés Barrio (ESP) | 12.93 SB |
WR world record | ER European record | CR championship record | NR national record | WL world leading | EL European leading | PB personal best | SB seasonal best

== See also ==
- List of IPC world records in athletics
