= 2021 World Para Athletics European Championships – Women's 200 metres =

The women's 200 metres events were held at the 2021 World Para Athletics European Championships in Bydgoszcz, Poland.

== Medalists ==
Event	Gold		Silver		Bronze	
T11	Libby Clegg (GBR); Guide: Chris Clarke	27.41	Delya Boulaghlem (FRA); Guide: Farah Clerc	27.60 PB	Yuliia Pavlenko (UKR); Guide: Viacheslav Ponka	27.66
T12	Anna Kulinich-Sorokina (RUS); Guide: Sergey Petrichenko	25.67	Nagore Folgado Garcia (ESP); Guide: Joan Raga Varo	26.19 PB	Alba García Falagán (ESP); Guide: Jonatan Orozco Moreno	26.48
T35	Maria Lyle (GBR)	30.75 CR	Jagoda Kibil (POL)	33.14	Not awarded	
T36	Yelyzaveta Henkina (UKR)	31.31 PB	Nicole Nicoleitzik (GER)	31.52 SB	Cheyenne Bouthoorn (NED)	31.66 PB
T37	Mandy François-Elie (FRA)	27.55	Nataliia Kobzar (UKR)	27.72	Viktoriia Slanova (RUS)	28.95 PB
T47	Saška Sokolov (SRB)	25.56	Alicja Jeromin (POL)	25.57 CR	Anastasiia Soloveva (RUS)	26.22
T64	Marlene van Gansewinkel (NED)	26.79	Kimberly Alkemade (NED)	27.10	Not awarded	
WR world record | ER European record | CR championship record | NR national record | WL world leading | EL European leading | PB personal best | SB seasonal best

== See also ==
- List of IPC world records in athletics
