= Miriam Dominikowska =

Polish para athlete (born 2001)

Personal information
- Nationality: Polish
- Born: 10 September 2001 (age 24)

Sport
- Sport: Para athletics
- Disability: Cerebral palsy
- Disability class: T71
- Event: 100 metres
Medal record
Women's para-athletics
Representing Poland
World Championships
Bronze medal – third place	2025 New Delhi	100 m T71
European Championships
Gold medal – first place	2021 Bydgoszcz	100 m RR1

Miriam Dominikowska (born 10 September 2001) is a Polish frame runner who competes in T71 sprint events.

== Career ==
Dominikowska competed at the 2025 World Para Athletics Championships and won a bronze medal in the 100 metres T71 event with a personal best time of 23.56 seconds.

== Personal life ==
Dominikowska was born premature and was with asphyxia.
