= Nienke Timmer =

Dutch Paralympic athlete (born 1998)

Personal information
- Nationality: Dutch
- Born: 10 February 1998 (age 28) Rotterdam, Netherlands

Sport
- Country: Netherlands
- Sport: Para-athletics
- Disability: Cerebral palsy
- Disability class: T35
- Events: 100 metres; 200 metres
Medal record
Women's para-athletics
Representing Netherlands
World Championships
| Bronze medal – third place | 2019 Dubai | 100 m T35 |
European Championships
| Silver medal – second place | 2018 Berlin | 100 m T35 |
| Silver medal – second place | 2018 Berlin | 200 m T35 |
| Silver medal – second place | 2021 Bydgoszcz | 100 m T35 |

Nienke Timmer (pronounced [ˈniŋkə ˈtɪmər]; born 10 February 1998) is a Dutch Paralympic athlete with cerebral palsy. She competes in 100 and 200 metres sprinting events for T35-classified athletes. She won the bronze medal in the women's 100 metres T35 event at the 2019 World Para Athletics Championships held in Dubai, United Arab Emirates. She is also a three-time silver medalist at the World Para Athletics European Championships.

== Career ==
In 2014, she finished in 4th place in both the women's 100 metres T35 and women's 200 metres T35 events at the IPC Athletics European Championships held in Swansea, United Kingdom. In 2015, she competed in the women's 100 metres T35 and women's 200 metres T35 events at the 2015 IPC Athletics World Championships held in Doha, Qatar. In 2018, she won the silver medal in both the women's 100 metres T35 and women's 200 metres T35 events at the World Para Athletics European Championships held in Berlin, Germany.

In 2019, she won the bronze medal in the women's 100 metres T35 event at the World Para Athletics Championships held in Dubai, United Arab Emirates. In 2021, she won the silver medal in the women's 100 metres T35 event at the World Para Athletics European Championships held in Bydgoszcz, Poland.

She represented the Netherlands at the 2020 Summer Paralympics in Tokyo, Japan. She competed in the women's 100 metres T35 and women's 200 metres T35 events.

== Achievements ==
| Year | Competition | Venue | Position | Event | Notes |
Representing Netherlands
| 2018 | European Championships | Berlin, Germany | 2nd | 100 metres | 16.05 |
| 2018 | European Championships | Berlin, Germany | 2nd | 200 metres | 34.79 |
| 2019 | World Championships | Dubai, United Arab Emirates | 3rd | 100 metres | 15.48 |
| 2021 | European Championships | Bydgoszcz, Poland | 2nd | 100 metres | 15.60 |
