= Athletics at the 2024 Summer Paralympics – Women's long jump T11 =

Women's long jump T11 at the XVII Paralympic Games
- Venue: Stade de France, Paris
- Date: 30 August 2024
- Competitors: 11 from 8 nations

Medalists
1st place, gold medalist(s)		Asila Mirzayorova	Uzbekistan
2nd place, silver medalist(s)		Zhou Guohua	China
3rd place, bronze medalist(s)		Alba Garcia Falagan	Spain

The Athletics at the 2024 Summer Paralympics – Women's long jump T11 event at the 2024 Summer Paralympics in Paris, took place on 30 August 2024.

== Classification ==
The T11 classification is for visually impaired athletes with a LogMAR less than 2.60. These athletes must compete blindfolded.

== Records ==
Prior to the competition, the existing records were as follows:

World Record	Silvania Costa de Oliviera (BRA)	5.46m	(Brazil) São Paulo	17 July 2016
Paralympic Record	Purificacion Ortiz (ESP)	5.07m	(United States) Atlanta	19 August 1996

== Results ==
=== Final ===
The final in this classification took place on 30 August 2024:

Rank	Athlete	Nationality	1	2	3	4	5	6	Best	Notes
1st place, gold medalist(s)	Asila Mirzayorova	Uzbekistan	5.22	5.12	5.19	4.89	5.24	5.12	5.24	PR =AR
2nd place, silver medalist(s)	Zhou Guohua	China	4.91	4.83	4.81	4.11	x	4.60	4.91	SB
3rd place, bronze medalist(s)	Alba Garcia Falagan	Spain	4.76	x	1.40	4.59	x	x	4.76	
4	Arjola Dedaj	Italy	4.55	x	4.47	4.47	4.52	4.75	4.75	PB
5	Delya Boulaghlem	France	4.35	x	4.42	x	4.48	4.20	4.48	
6	Alice de Oliveira Correa	Brazil	x	4.35	4.26	1.36	4.38	4.24	4.38	
7	Franyeli Nataly Vargas Ruiz	Venezuela	3.76	4.10	4.04	3.16	x	4.18	4.18	
8	Rosario Trinidad Coppola Molina	Argentina	3.77	3.93	4.03	3.87	3.96	4.05	4.05	
9	Rosibel Colmenares	Venezuela	3.86	3.90	x	—	—	—	3.90	
10	Sofia Valentina Casse	Argentina	3.77	3.82	x	—	—	—	3.82	
11	Lorena Silva Spoladore	Brazil	1.40	x	3.67	—	—	—	3.67	
