= Liu Yiming (athlete) =

Chinese para-athlete (born 2006)

Personal information
- Born: 1 March 2006 (age 20)

Sport
- Sport: Para-athletics
- Disability class: T11
- Event: Sprints
Medal record
Para-athletics
Representing China
World Championships
Silver medal – second place	2025 New Delhi	100 m T11
Silver medal – second place	2025 New Delhi	200 m T11

Liu Yiming (born 1 March 2006) is a Chinese T11 para-athlete who competes in sprinting events.

== Career ==
Liu competed in the 2025 World Para Athletics Championships with Chen Wenqi as her sight guide. She won a silver medal in the 100 metres T11 event. She then won her second silver medal in the 200 metres T11 event.
