= Marlene van Gansewinkel =

Dutch Paralympic athlete (born 1995)

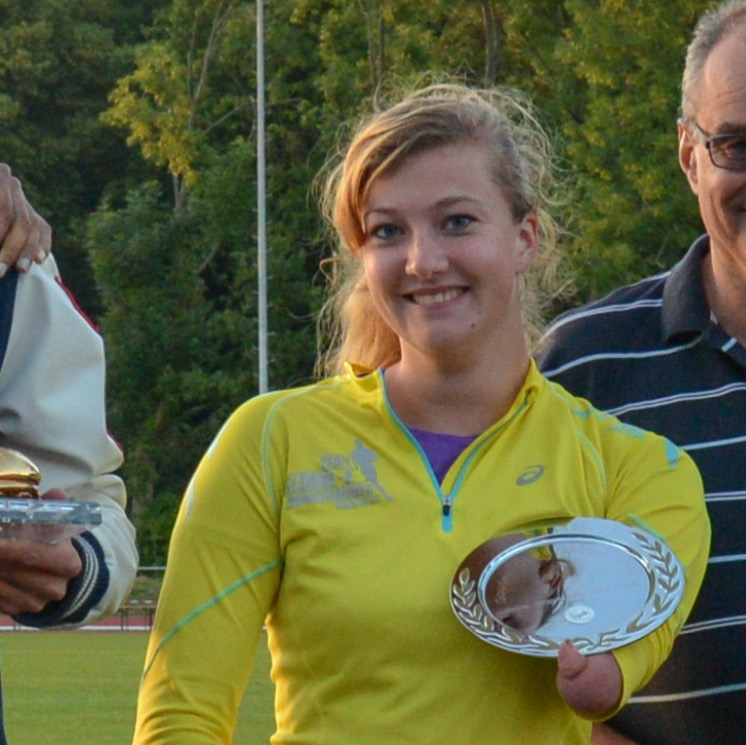
- Marlene van Gansewinkel (2014)

Personal information
- Born: 11 March 1995 (age 31) Tilburg, Netherlands

Sport
- Country: Netherlands
- Sport: Para-athletics
- Disability: Limb deficiency
- Disability class: T64 (2018 – present); T44 (until 2018)
- Events: Long jump; 100 metres; 200 metres; 400 metres
- Coached by: Guido Bonsen
Medal record
Women's para-athletics
Representing Netherlands
Paralympic Games
Gold medal – first place	2020 Tokyo	100 metres T64
Gold medal – first place	2020 Tokyo	200 metres T64
Silver medal – second place	2024 Paris	200 m T64
Silver medal – second place	2024 Paris	Long jump T64
Bronze medal – third place	2016 Rio de Janeiro	Long jump T44
Bronze medal – third place	2020 Tokyo	Long jump T64
Bronze medal – third place	2024 Paris	100 m T64
World Championships
Gold medal – first place	2024 Kobe	200 m T64
Gold medal – first place	2025 New Delhi	200 m T64
Silver medal – second place	2015 Doha	Long jump T44
Silver medal – second place	2017 London	Long jump T44
Silver medal – second place	2019 Dubai	100 m T64
Silver medal – second place	2019 Dubai	Long jump T64
Silver medal – second place	2023 Paris	Long jump T64
Silver medal – second place	2024 Kobe	Long jump T64
Silver medal – second place	2024 Kobe	100 m T64
Silver medal – second place	2025 New Delhi	100 m T64
European Championships
Gold medal – first place	2018 Berlin	100 m T64
Gold medal – first place	2018 Berlin	200 m T64
Gold medal – first place	2021 Bydgoszcz	200 m T64
Silver medal – second place	2018 Berlin	Long jump T64
Silver medal – second place	2021 Bydgoszcz	100 m T64
Silver medal – second place	2021 Bydgoszcz	Long jump T64

Marlene van Gansewinkel (born 11 March 1995) is a Dutch Paralympic athlete. In 2021, she won the gold medal in both the women's 100 metres T64 and 200 metres T64 events at the 2020 Summer Paralympics in Tokyo, Japan. She also won the bronze medal in the women's long jump T64 event.

In 2016, she won the bronze medal in the women's long jump T44 event at the Summer Paralympics in Rio de Janeiro, Brazil. She has also won medals in the long jump and in sprinting events at the World Para Athletics Championships and the World Para Athletics European Championships.

== Early life ==
Van Gansewinkel was born without her lower left leg and lower left arm.

== Career ==
Early in her career, Van Gansewinkel competed as a T44-classified athlete. In 2014, she competed in the women's 100 metres T44, 200 metres T44 and 400 metres T44 events at the IPC Athletics European Championships held in Swansea, Wales. She missed out on winning a medal as she finished in 4th place in all three events. At the 2015 IPC Athletics World Championships held in Doha, Qatar, she won the silver medal in the women's long jump T44 event.

Van Gansewinkel represented the Netherlands at the 2016 Summer Paralympics in Rio de Janeiro, Brazil and she won the bronze medal in the women's long jump T44 event. She also competed in the women's 100 metres T44 event where she finished in 7th place.

At the beginning of 2018, World Para Athletics implemented classification changes and, as of that year, Van Gansewinkel competes as a T64-classified athlete, a class specifically for athletes with a single below the knee amputation. In that year, she won the gold medal in both the women's 100 metres T64 and women's 200 metres T64 events at the 2018 World Para Athletics European Championships held in Berlin, Germany. In the 100 metres she also set a new world record of 12.85 seconds.

In 2019, Van Gansewinkel won the silver medal in the women's 100 metres T64 event at the World Para Athletics Championships held in Dubai, United Arab Emirates. She also won the silver medal in the women's long jump T64 event. She was disqualified in the women's 200 metres T64 event for running out of lane.

In 2021, she won the gold medal in the women's 200 metres T64 event at the World Para Athletics European Championships held in Bydgoszcz, Poland. She also won the silver medal in the women's 100 metres T64 and women's long jump T64 events. In the long jump she set a new personal best of 5.82 metres.

Van Gansewinkel represented the Netherlands at the 2020 Summer Paralympics in Tokyo, Japan. She won the gold medal in both the women's 100 metres T64 and 200 metres T64 events. She also won the bronze medal in the women's long jump T64 event.

She won the silver medal in the women's long jump T64 event at the 2023 World Para Athletics Championships held in Paris, France. In 2024, Van Gansewinkel won three medals at the Summer Paralympics held in Paris, France. She won the silver medal in the women's 200 metres T64 event and also the silver medal in the women's long jump T64 event. Van Gansewinkel won the bronze medal in the women's 100 metres T64 event. The event was a podium sweep for the Netherlands, with Fleur Jong and Kimberly Alkemade winning the gold and silver medal respectively.

== Awards ==
In 2018, she won the Dutch Paralympic Athlete of the Year award.

== Personal life ==
In 2017, Van Gansewinkel founded Team Para Atletiek together with Paralympic athlete Fleur Jong and coach Guido Bonsen which aims to help beginning and experienced para-athletes.

== Achievements ==
=== Track ===
Year	Competition	Venue	Position	Event	Notes
Representing Netherlands
2018	European Championships	Berlin, Germany	1st	100 metres T64	12.85 s
2018	European Championships	Berlin, Germany	1st	200 metres T64	26.12 s
2019	World Championships	Dubai, United Arab Emirates	2nd	100 metres T64	12.96 s
2021	European Championships	Bydgoszcz, Poland	2nd	100 metres T64	12.80 s
2021	European Championships	Bydgoszcz, Poland	1st	200 metres T64	26.79 s
2021	Summer Paralympics	Tokyo, Japan	1st	100 metres T64	12.78 s
2021	Summer Paralympics	Tokyo, Japan	1st	200 metres T64	26.22 s
2024	World Championships	Kobe, Japan	2nd	100 metres T64	12.73 s
2024	World Championships	Kobe, Japan	1st	200 metres T64	25.73 s
2024	Summer Paralympics	Paris, France	3rd	100 metres T64	12.72 s
2024	Summer Paralympics	Paris, France	2nd	200 metres T64	26.14 s

=== Field ===
Year	Competition	Venue	Position	Event	Notes
Representing Netherlands
2015	World Championships	Doha, Qatar	2nd	Long jump T44	5.27 m
2016	Summer Paralympics	Rio de Janeiro, Brazil	3rd	Long jump T44	5.57 m
2017	World Championships	London, United Kingdom	2nd	Long jump T44	5.29 m
2018	European Championships	Berlin, Germany	2nd	Long jump T64	5.61 m
2019	World Championships	Dubai, United Arab Emirates	2nd	Long jump T64	5.28 m
2021	European Championships	Bydgoszcz, Poland	2nd	Long jump T64	5.82 m
2021	Summer Paralympics	Tokyo, Japan	3rd	Long jump T64	5.78 m
2023	World Championships	Paris, France	2nd	Long jump T64	5.40 m
2024	World Championships	Kobe, Japan	2nd	Long jump T64	5.45 m
2024	Summer Paralympics	Paris, France	2nd	Long jump T64	5.87 m
