= Giusy Versace =

Italian Paralympic athlete (born 1977)

Giuseppina Versace
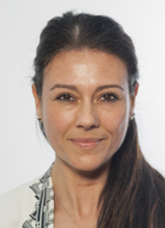

Personal information
- Full name: Giuseppina Versace
- Nickname: Giusy
- Born: 20 May 1977 (age 49) Reggio Calabria, Italy

Sport
- Country: Italy
- Sport: Paralympic athletics
- Disability class: T44
- Event(s): 100 metres 200 metres 400 metres
- Club: Fiamme Azzurre
- Coached by: Michele Gionfriddo; Andrea Giannini
Medal record
Paralympic athletics
Representing Italy
European Championships
Silver medal – second place	2016 Grosseto	Women's 200m T44
Bronze medal – third place	2016 Grosseto	Women's 400m T44

Giuseppina "Giusy" Versace (born 20 May 1977) is an Italian Paralympic athlete who competes in sprinting events in international level events and a television presenter and member of the Senate. She was also a member of the Chamber of Deputies.

== Personal life ==
Versace is the daughter of Alfredo Versace and cousin to fashion designers Gianni Versace, Donatella Versace and Santo Versace through her father's side.

Versace founded the non-government organisation Disability No Limits, it is a support charity that encourages disabled children to try different sports. She is also an ambassador for Save the Dream, a national project organised by the Qatar Olympic Committee which aims to promote sport among young people.

== Accident ==
On 22 August 2005, Versace was the victim of a serious traffic accident on a motorway. She lost control of the car that she was driving and crashed into crash barriers, which caused her to lose both of her legs below the knee. A few years after the accident, she went to the Court of Rome to sue Anas, the company that improves safety of motorways, for the poor maintenance of the crash barrier which caused her life changing injury, the court ruled that the barrier was of "very poor maintenance conditions and had very serious installation anomalies", Anas stated that they "could not allow the barrier extension on the stretch of road without imposing necessary measures to eliminate risks", Versace was awarded compensation of €1,485,182.

== Sporting career ==
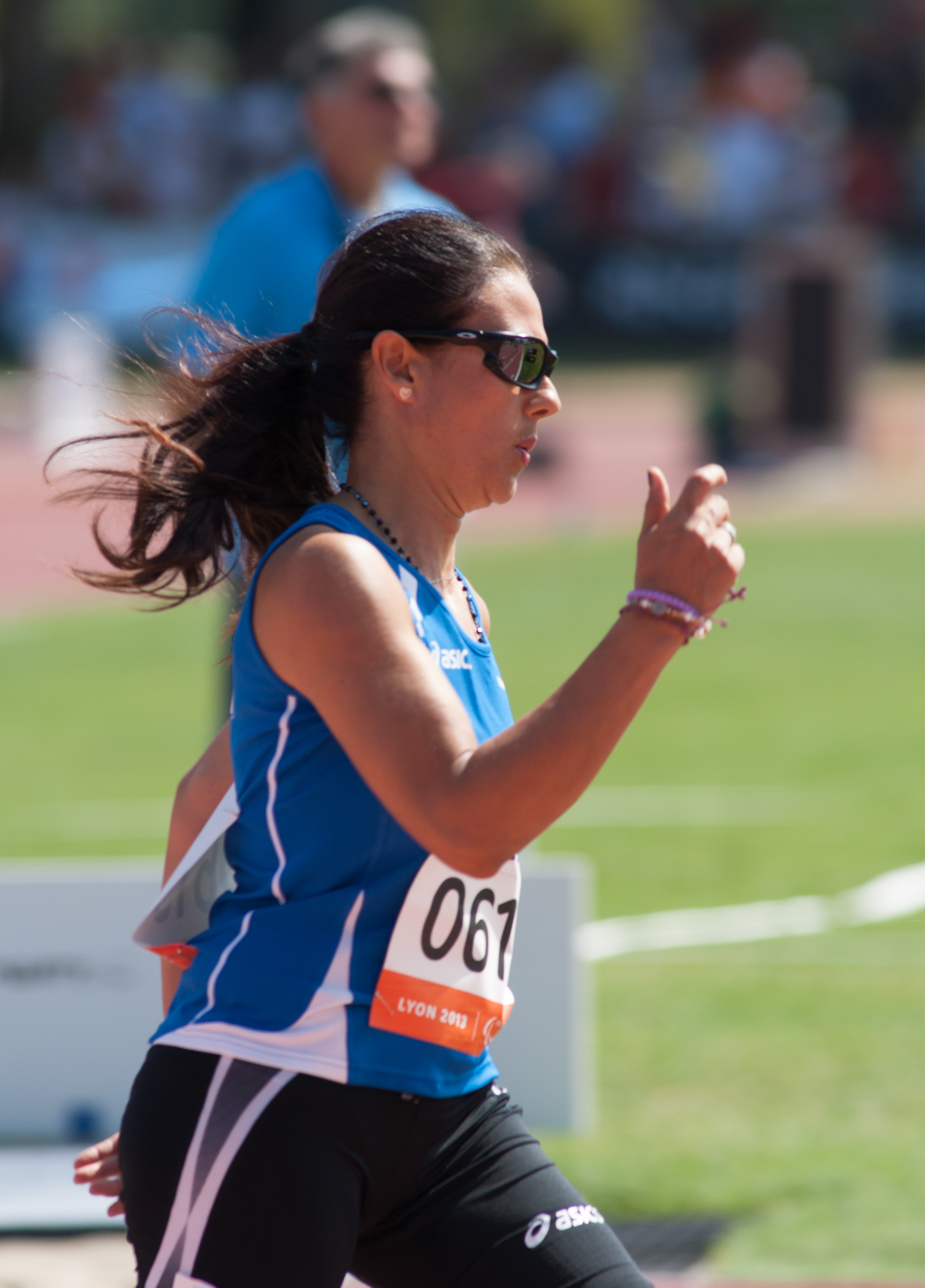
Versace at the 2013 IPC Athletics World Championships

After Versace's accident, she decided to take up sport in 2010 when she began racing with carbon prosthesis. She participated in the Italian Athletics Championships became the first Italian athlete to run with bilateral amputation, she has won eleven national titles to her name as well as national records in the 60 metres, 100 metres and 200 metres runs.

Her first international debut in the athletics world was competing at the 2013 IPC Athletics World Championships in Lyon. She was seventh in the women's 200m T44 and was a semi-finalist in the women's 100m T44.

The peak of athletics career was in 2016 when she won two medals in the 2016 IPC Athletics European Championships: a silver in the 200m T44 and a bronze in the 400m T44. She competed in the 2016 Summer Paralympics in Rio de Janeiro where she didn't advance to the finals in 100m T44 and was eighth in the 200m T44.

== Professional career ==
Versace's first television appearance was competing in Ballando con le Stelle in 2014 with dancing partner Raimondo Todaro and won the competition; she was the first winner with an impairment in any international edition of Dancing with the Stars.

Versace began co-presenting La Domenica Sportiva (The Sunday Sport) in 2015 alongside Alessandro Antinelli, an Italian sports journalist.
