= Alba García Falagán =

Spanish para-athlete (born 2002)

Personal information
- Born: 16 February 2002 (age 24) Alcalá de Henares, Spain

Sport
- Sport: Para-athletics
- Disability class: T11
- Event(s): Sprints; Long jump
Medal record
Para-athletics
Representing Spain
Paralympic Games
Bronze medal – third place	2024 Paris	Long jump T11
World Championships
Gold medal – first place	2025 New Delhi	Long jump T11
Bronze medal – third place	2025 New Delhi	100 m T11
European Championships
Silver medal – second place	2021 Bydgoszcz	100 m T12
Bronze medal – third place	2021 Bydgoszcz	200 m T12

Alba García Falagán (born 16 February 2002) is a Spanish T11 para-athlete.

== Career ==
She represented Spain at the 2024 Summer Paralympics and won a bronze medal in the long jump T11 event. She competed at the 2025 World Para Athletics Championships and won a gold medal in the long jump T11 event and a bronze medal in the 100 metres T11 event.
