= Zeynep Acet =

Turkish Paralympic athlete

Personal information
- Born: 5 March 1995 (age 31) Batman, Turkey

Sport
- Country: Turkey
- Sport: Athletics
- Disability class: T53
- Club: Bağcılar Belediyesi Disabled SK
Medal record
Track and field
Representing Turkey
World Para Athletics European Championships
Bronze medal – third place	2021 Bydgoszcz	100m T53
Bronze medal – third place	2021 Bydgoszcz	400m T53
IPC Athletics European Championships
Bronze medal – third place	2018 Berlin	200m T53

Zeynep Acet (born 5 March 1995) is a Turkish Paralympian athlete competing in the T53 disability class sprint events of 100m and 400m. She is a member of the Bağcılar Belediyesi Disabled SK in Istanbul.

She won the title in the women's disabled category at the 2015 Istanbul Marathon with 2:11:13 before her club mate Hamide Kurt.

She competed in three events at the 2016 IPC Athletics European Championships held in Grosseto, Italy. She won the silver medal in the 200m T53 event at the 2018 IPC Athletics European Championships in Berlin, Germany running in 35.78. She took the bronze medal in the 100m T53 event of the 2021 World Para Athletics European Championships in Bydgoszcz, Poland. She won further the silver medal in the 400m T53 event in the same championship.
