= Clara Barros =

Brazilian Paralympic athlete (born 1998)

Personal information
- Full name: Clara Daniele Barros da Silva
- Born: 19 January 1998 (age 28)

Sport
- Sport: Paralympic athletics
- Disability class: T12
- Event(s): 100 metres 200 metres 400 metres
Medal record
Representing Brazil
World Championships
Gold medal – first place	2025 New Delhi	200m T12

Clara Daniele Barros da Silva (born 19 January 1998), commonly known as Clara Barros, is a Brazilian Paralympic athlete who competes in sprinting events at international track and field competitions.

== Career ==
Barros represented Brazil at the 2024 Summer Paralympics and competed in the 100 metre and 200 metres events, reaching the semifinals in the latter. She competed at the 2025 World Para Athletics Championships and won the gold medal in the 200 m T12 event.
