= Marie N'Goussou =

French para athlete (born 2008)

Personal information
- Born: 2 December 2008 (age 17)
- Home town: Orléans, France

Sport
- Sport: Para athletics
- Disability class: T47
Medal record
Women's para-athletics
Representing France
World Championships
Bronze medal – third place	2025 New Delhi	100 m T47

Marie N'Goussou (born 2 December 2008) also known as Marie Ngoussou-Ngouyi is a French para athlete who competes in T47 sprint events. She represented France at the 2024 Summer Paralympics.

== Career ==
N'Goussou represented France at the 2024 Summer Paralympics and finished in sixth place in the 100 metres T47 event, with a time of 12.58 seconds. At age 15, she was the youngest member of the French Paralympic delegation at the 2024 Summer Paralympics. She competed at the 2025 World Para Athletics Championships and won a bronze medal in the 100 metres T47 event.
