= Zofia Kałucka =

Polish para athlete (born 2002)

Zofia Kalucka
Personal information
- Nationality: Polish
- Born: 3 November 2002 (age 23)

Sport
- Sport: Para athletics
- Disability class: T72
- Event: 100 metres
Medal record
Women's para-athletics
Representing Poland
World Championships
Bronze medal – third place	2025 New Delhi	100 m T72
European Championships
Bronze medal – third place	2021 Bydgoszcz	100 m RR3

Zofia Kalucka (born 3 November 2002) is a Polish frame runner who competes in T72 sprint events.

== Career ==
Kalucka competed at the 2021 World Para Athletics European Championships and won a bronze medal in the 100 metres RR3 event with a time of 20.19 seconds. She competed at the 2025 World Para Athletics Championships and won a bronze medal in the 100 metres T72 event with a time of 19.16 seconds.
