= Victoria Levitt =

British Paralympic athlete (born 1996)

Personal information
- Born: 13 April 1996 (age 30)

Sport
- Country: Great Britain
- Sport: Paralympic athletics
- Disability class: T44
Medal record
Paralympic athletics
Representing Great Britain
World Championships
Gold medal – first place	2025 New Delhi	100m T44
Silver medal – second place	2025 New Delhi	200m T44

Victoria Jade Levitt (born 13 April 1996) is an English Paralympic athlete who competes in sprinting events at international track and field competitions.

== Career ==
Making her international debut, Levitt competed in the 2025 World Para Athletics Championships held in New Delhi, where she won the gold medal in the 100m T44 event. She also won the silver medal in the 200m T44 event.

== Personal life ==
In addition to her athletics career. Levitt is employed by Tesco in Mansfield as well working as an administrator for a disability charity.
