= Sydney Barta =

American track and field athlete

Personal information
- Born: February 16, 2004 (age 22)
- Height: 5'11

Sport
- Country: United States
- Sport: Paralympic athletics
- Disability class: T64
- Event(s): 100 metres 200 metres
Medal record
Women's para-athletics
Representing the United States
World Championships
Silver medal – second place	2024 Kobe	200 m T64
Bronze medal – third place	2025 New Delhi	200 m T64
Parapan American Games
Gold medal – first place	2023 Santiago	200 m T64
Gold medal – first place	2019 Lima	200 m T64

Sydney Barta (born February 16, 2004) is an American track and field athlete. An amputee, she became the first Paralympian to compete for Stanford University, running the 200 meter race on April 25, 2025 at the Payton Jordan Invitational. Barta won Gold in the 200m at the Parapan American Games in Santiago Chile in November 2023, and Silver at the World Championships in Kobe, Japan the following May. She also competed in the 100 meter and 200 meter races in the 2020 Tokyo Paralympic Games. Barta competes in the T64 classification. In 2019, she was awarded US Paralympics Track and Field Female High School Athlete of the Year.

== Career ==
Barta grew up in Arlington, Virginia, and attended the National Cathedral School in Washington, DC, where she competed in varsity basketball, volleyball and track. She was inducted into the Cum Laude Society, and was recognized as a National Merit Semi-finalist as a senior. Her mother, Laura, played basketball for Princeton University in New Jersey. When Barta was six years old, she was finishing a fun run when metal scaffolding fell onto her, shattering her left ankle. She spent the next months in hospital and, while being treated for her injury, she developed compartment syndrome. Her wound became infected leading to a portion of her left leg being removed over the course of 21 surgeries. She was eight years old when she competed in her first track and field fixture in Fort Wayne. Barta competed in seven events and swam the 200m freestyle swimming over the course of two days. At the event, Barta met the head of the Challenged Athletes Foundation which resulted in the organization donating an improved running blade to her.

Barta won gold in the 100, 200 and 400 meters at the 2019 World Para Athletics Junior Championships in Switzerland and her performance in this championship landed her a place in the Parapan American Games in Lima, Peru, where she won gold in the 200 meters. Barta competed in the World Para Athletics Championships in 2019 where she entered three events finishing 7th in the shot put T64, 4th in the 200 metres T64 and 9th in the discus throw T64. In the 2020 Paralympic Games, Barta qualified for the 200 metres final where she narrowly missed out on a medal, finishing 4th behind Kimberly Alkemade of the Netherlands.

== Education ==
Barta is a high school graduate of The National Cathedral School in Washington, D.C. She now attends Stanford University, and is in her final year concentrating in bioengineering and human biology. In 2023, she completed summer research on gait analysis as a Wu Tsai scholar with a prominent orthopaedic surgeon at Stanford, while training for the 2023 Para Panamerican Games in Santiago, Chile where she won gold in the 200 meters, T64.
