= Nagore Folgado García =

Spanish Paralympic athlete (born 2004)

Personal information
- Born: 23 March 2004 (age 22) Valencia, Spain

Sport
- Country: Spain
- Sport: Paralympic athletics
- Disability: Retinoblastoma
- Disability class: T12
- Event(s): 100 metres 200 metres
Medal record
Paralympic athletics
Representing Spain
World Championships
Bronze medal – third place	2023 Paris	100m T12
Bronze medal – third place	2025 New Delhi	100m T12
European Championships
Gold medal – first place	2021 Bydgoszcz	100m T12
Silver medal – second place	2021 Bydgoszcz	200m T12

Nagore Folgado García (born 23 March 2004) is a Spanish Paralympic athlete who competes in sprinting events at international elite track and field competitions.

== Career ==
She represented Spain at the 2021 World Para Athletics European Championships and won a gold medal in the 100 metres T12 event and a silver medal in the s 200 metres T12 event.

She also represented Spain at the 2020 Summer Paralympics.

== Personal life ==
Folgado had bilateral retinoblastoma at two years old, her left eye is totally blind and she has very limited vision in her right eye.
