= Kimberly Alkemade =

Dutch Paralympic sprinter

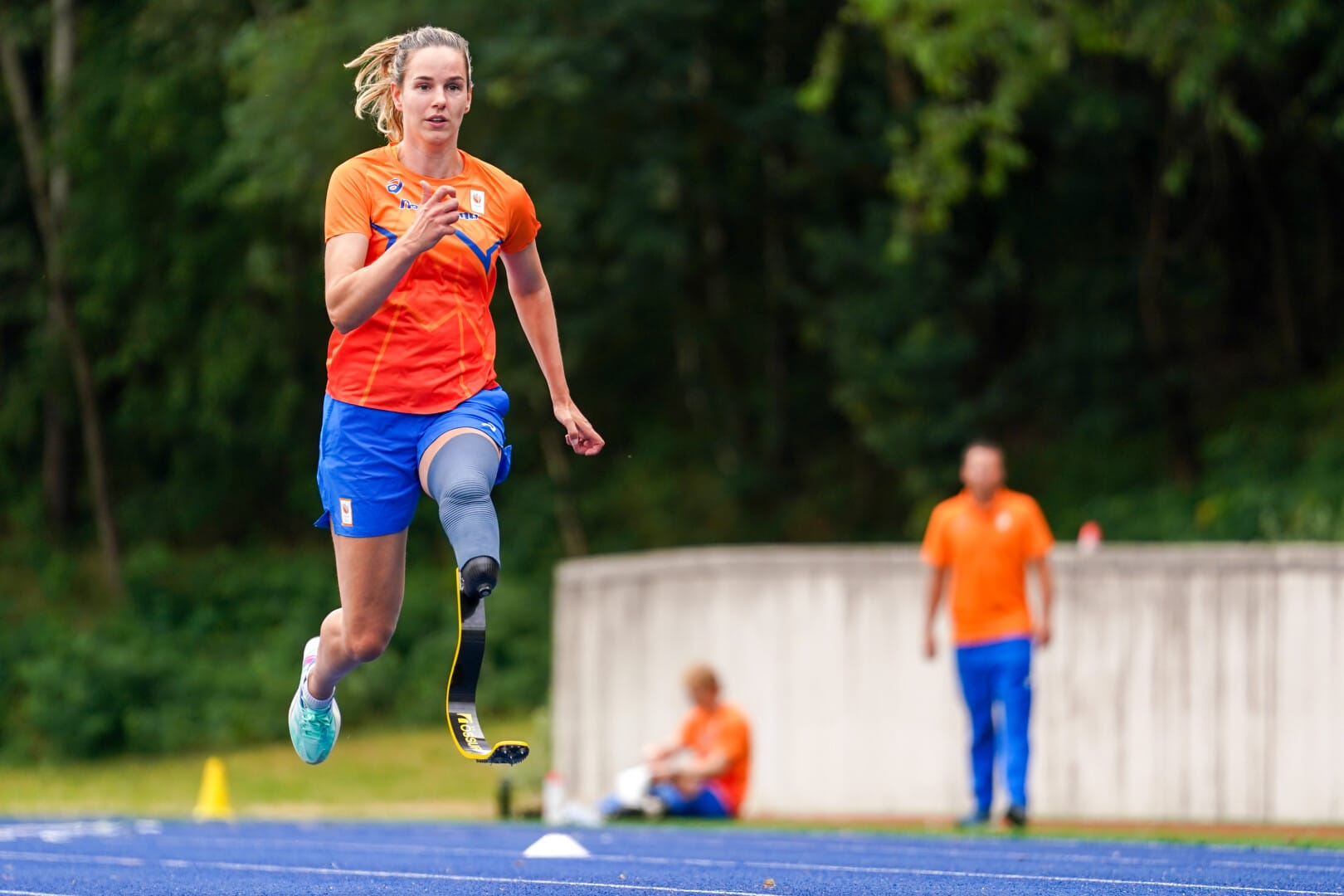
- Kimberly Alkemade in 2023

Personal information
- Nickname: Kimmy
- Nationality: Dutch
- Born: 29 March 1990 (age 36) Zoetermeer, Netherlands
- Height: 1.80 m (5 ft 11 in)

Sport
- Sport: Paralympic athletics
- Disability: Amputee, Lower left leg
- Disability class: T64
- Events: 100 metres, 200 metres
- Club: Eindhoven Atletiek
- Coached by: Janna Doumpas & Nedim Nuhanovic

Achievements and titles
- Personal bests: 60 m (T64): 8.25 (2024); 100 m (T64): 12.46 (2024, WR); 200 m (T64): 25.29 (2024, WR)
Medal record
Paralympic athletics
Representing Netherlands
Paralympic Games
| Gold medal – first place | 2024 Paris | 200 m T64 |
| Silver medal – second place | 2024 Paris | 100 m T64 |
| Bronze medal – third place | 2020 Tokyo | 200 m T64 |
World Championships
| Silver medal – second place | 2023 Paris | 200 m T64 |
| Silver medal – second place | 2019 Dubai | 200 m T64 |
| Bronze medal – third place | 2019 Dubai | 100 m T64 |
European Championships
| Silver medal – second place | 2021 Bydgoszcz | 200 m T64 |

Kimberly Alkemade (born 29 March 1990) is a Dutch Paralympic athlete.

== Career ==
Alkemade lost her left lower leg in a bus accident in 1998 near Montelimar, France, and started in Para athletics. The 2019 World Para Athletics Championships was her first big tournament.

She represented the Netherlands at the 2019 World Para Athletics Championships held in Dubai, United Arab Emirates and won a silver medal in the women's 200 metres T64 event and the bronze medal in the women's 100 metres T64 event.

She represented the Netherlands at the 2020 Summer Paralympics in Tokyo, Japan. At the 2020 Summer Paralympics, she won the bronze medal in the women's 200 metres T64 event. She finished in 5th place in the women's 100 metres T64 event.

Alkemade won the silver medal in the women's 200 metres T64 event at the 2023 World Para Athletics Championships held in Paris, France.

In April 2025, Alkemade ended her elite athletic career and shifted her focus to a societal role. She explored several sports, including snowboarding and rowing, but concluded that these served more as hobbies than as elite-level pursuits. During this period, she took up HYROX, which reignited her interest in running.

Following the birth of her son Kay in March 2026, she decided to return to competitive athletics. A physician at the hospital encouraged her by stating that she could combine motherhood with elite sport, referring to his network of expertise on the subject. In August 2026, she resumed training at the track of Eindhoven Atletiek, with the Paralympic Games in Los Angeles in 2028 as her main goal. She emphasized having discovered what she definitely did not want, and that her passion alongside athletics lay in nutrition and dietetics, for which she planned to pursue a degree.

== Queen of Blades ==
Kimberly Alkemade is one of a few athletes that has won medals on a world stage with blades from various different manufacturers. In her case, Ottobock, Xiborg and Ossür. Earning her the nickname "Queen of Blades".

- Ottobock Sprinter - 🥈 200m & 🥉 100m World Para Athletics Championship 2019
- Xiborg V - 🥉 200m Paralympic Games Tokyo 2021
- Ossür Cheetah Extreme - 🥈 200m World Para Athletics Championship 2023, 🥇200m &🥈100m Paralympic Games 2024

== Personal bests ==
- 60 metres (T64): 8.25 (2024)
- 100 metres (T64): 12.46 s (2024, WR)
- 200 metres (T64): 25.29 s (2024, WR)
