= Lia Beel Quintana =

Spanish Paralympic athlete (born 1995)

Personal information
- Born: 22 July 1995 (age 30) Pinjarra, Australia
- Home town: Burgos, Spain
- Height: 1.66 m (5 ft 5 in)

Sport
- Country: Spain
- Sport: Paralympic athletics
- Disability: Retinitis pigmentosa
- Disability class: T11
- Event(s): 100 metres 200 metres 400 metres 4 × 100 metre relay
- Club: Club Deportivo Dromos, Castilla y León
- Coached by: Juan Jose Morgado Martin
Medal record
Paralympic athletics
Representing Spain
World Championships
Bronze medal – third place	2015 Doha	Women's 4 × 100 m relay T11-13
European Championships
Gold medal – first place	2018 Berlin	Women's 200 m T11
Silver medal – second place	2018 Berlin	Women's 100 m T11

Lia Beel Quintana (born 22 July 1995 in Pinjarra, Australia) is a blind Spanish Paralympic athlete who competes in sprinting events in international level events. She trains with her husband David Alonso Gutierrez who is her running guide.
