= Maria Tietze =

German Paralympic athlete

Personal information
- Born: 24 May 1989 (age 37) Berlin, East Germany
- Home town: Leverkusen, Germany
- Height: 1.67 m (5 ft 6 in)

Sport
- Country: Germany
- Sport: Paralympic athletics
- Disability class: T64
- Events: 100 metres 200 metres Long jump
- Club: TSV Bayer 04 Leverkusen

Maria Tietze (born 24 May 1989) is a German Paralympic athlete and former association football player. She was a very keen footballer before she was involved in a motorcycle accident which resulted in her left leg amputated below the knee.

Her highest achievement in Paralympic athletics competitions is finishing at fourth place at the 2018 World Para Athletics European Championships in the women's long jump T64.
