= Tanja Henseler =

Swiss Paralympic athlete

Personal information
- Born: 18 September 1997 (age 28)

Sport
- Country: Switzerland
- Sport: Paralympic athletics
- Disability: Caudal regression syndrome
- Disability class: T53
- Event(s): 100 metres 200 metres 400 metres
- Club: RC Zentralschweiz, Malters, Switzerland
- Coached by: Beat Fah
Medal record
Paralympic athletics
Representing Switzerland
World Championships
Gold medal – first place	2018 Berlin	Women's 100m T53
Bronze medal – third place	2018 Berlin	Women's 200m T53
Bronze medal – third place	2018 Berlin	Women's 400m T53

Tanja Henseler (born 18 September 1997) is a Swiss Paralympic athlete who competes in sprinting events in international level events.
