= Marissa Papaconstantinou =

Canadian Paralympic athlete (born 1999)

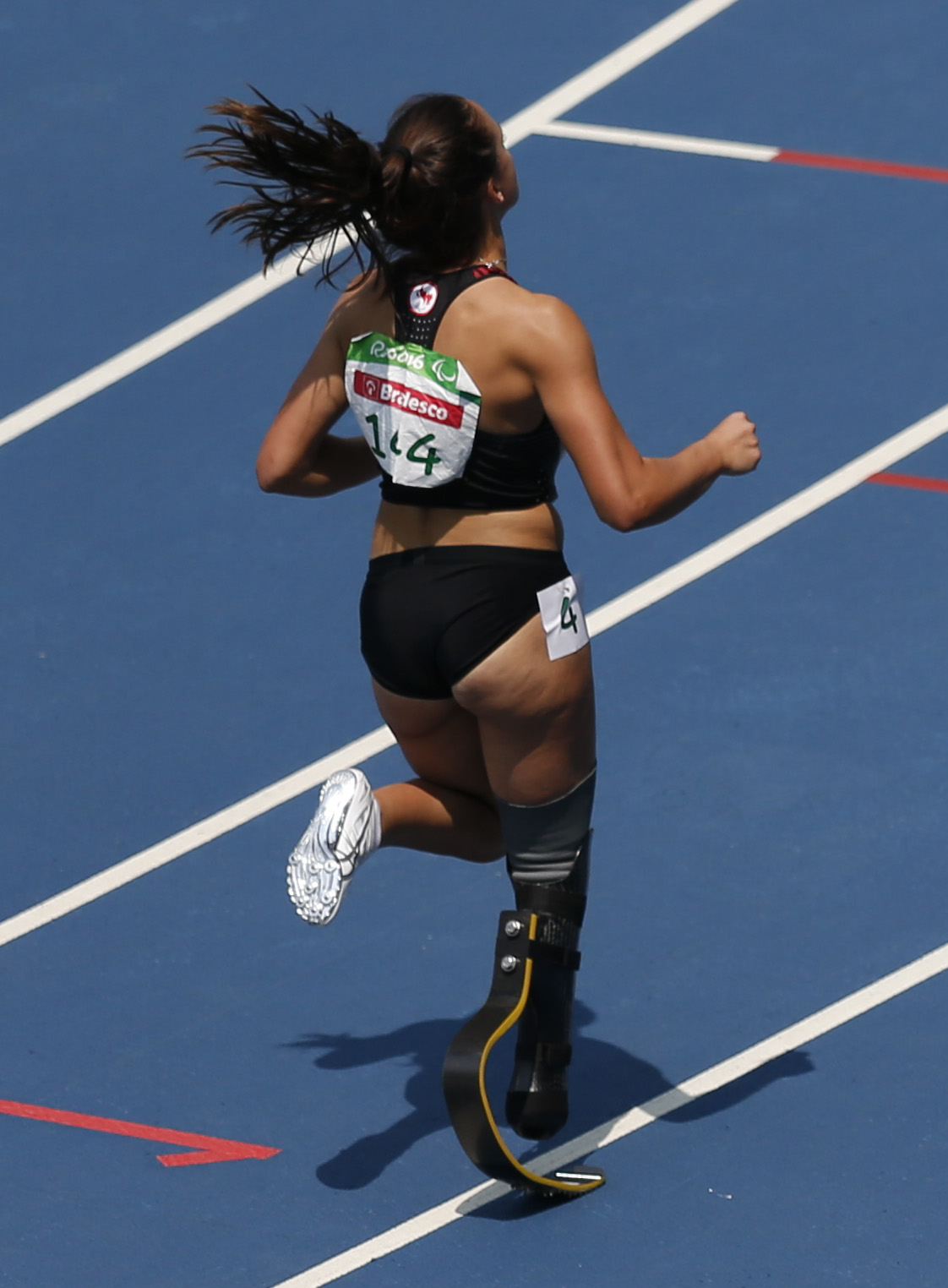
- Papaconstantinou at the 2016 Summer Paralympics

Personal information
- Born: October 13, 1999 (age 26) Toronto, Ontario, Canada
- Education: Ryerson University

Sport
- Country: Canada
- Sport: Para athletics
- Disability class: T64
- Coached by: Bob Westman
Medal record
Women's para athletics
Representing Canada
Paralympic Games
Bronze medal – third place	2020 Tokyo	100 m T64
World Championships
Silver medal – second place	2025 New Delhi	200 m T64
Bronze medal – third place	2023 Paris	100 m T64
Bronze medal – third place	2023 Paris	200 m T64
Bronze medal – third place	2025 New Delhi	100 m T64

Marissa Papaconstantinou (born October 13, 1999) is a Canadian Paralympic athlete who competes in the 100m T64 in international level events. She qualified for the 2020 Summer Paralympics, in 100 m T64 and 200 m T64, winning the bronze medal in the former.

== Early life ==
Papaconstantinou was born on October 13, 1999, in Toronto, Ontario to parents Kathy and Bill. Due to her Greek ancestry, she spent most of her summers with her family in Greece. Having been born without her right foot, Papaconstantinou originally played football and basketball before committing to track athletics after being fitted with her first running blade at the age of 12. Following the fitting, she set the Canadian T64 classification record for the 100 metres. Papaconstantinou was later selected by Athletics Canada and was invited to Ottawa for a Paralympic Camp. In 2014, Her running blade inspired an exhibit on 21st century bionics and prosthetics at the Ontario Science Centre.

== Career ==
While training with the Phoenix Track Club, Papaconstantinou represented Canada for the first time at the 2015 IPC Athletics World Championships. The following year, she was named to Canada's 2016 Summer Paralympics team when she was 16 years old. Although she qualified for the 200m final, Papaconstantinou was disqualified due to a lane violation. Following this, she competed at the 2017 World Para Athletics Championships where she finished the race with a torn hamstring. Due to this, she finished 58.06, 32 seconds behind Marlou van Rhijn. Upon making her international debut, students at Bill Crothers Secondary School painted a mural of her on one of their walls inside the school. Upon returning to North America, Papaconstantinou began her first year at Ryerson University and trained with the Toronto Varsity Blues.

In 2019, Papaconstantinou ranked third in the world in the 100 and 200 metres for the T64 classification. She also signed with Nike, Inc. to become the first female Canadian athlete to be sponsored by them. During the 100 metres T64 at the 2020 Summer Paralympics, Papaconstantinou set a personal best time of 13.07 seconds during the race to finish third behind Marlene van Gansewinkel and Irmgard Bensusan.

Papaconstantinou won the bronze medal in the 100 m and 200 metres T64 events at the 2023 World Para Athletics Championships held in Paris, France.

Papaconstantinou competed at the 2025 World Para Athletics Championships and won the bronze medal in the 100 m. She then took home Canada's first silver medal of the games, placing 2nd in the women's T64 200m in 27.07 seconds.
