= Annie Carey =

American Paralympic athlete (born 2004)

Personal information
- Born: October 2, 2004 (age 22) Datong, Shanxi, China
- Home town: Boise, Idaho, U.S.
- Height: 5 ft 3 in (160 cm)

Sport
- Country: United States
- Sport: Paralympic athletics
- Disability: Clubfoot
- Disability class: T44, T64
- Events: 100 metres 200 metres Long jump
Medal record
Paralympic athletics
Representing United States
World Championships
Gold medal – first place	2025 New Delhi	200m T44
Silver medal – second place	2025 New Delhi	100m T44
Parapan American Games
Bronze medal – third place	2019 Lima	100m T64
Bronze medal – third place	2019 Lima	Long jump T42-44/T61-63
Bronze medal – third place	2023 Santiago	100m T64
Bronze medal – third place	2023 Santiago	200m T64
Bronze medal – third place	2023 Santiago	Long jump T42-44/T61-63

Catherine Anne Carey (born October 2, 2004) is an American Paralympic athlete who competes in long jump and sprinting events at international track and field competitions.

== Early life ==
Born in Datong, Shanxi, China, Carey was adopted by Sarah and Geoff Carey and grew up in Idaho. She was born with a left clubfoot which was corrected by undergoing surgery and also resulted in drop foot and nerve damage. Carey began playing basketball and soccer at the age of five. She then began took up swimming and track and field two years later. She attended Bishop Kelly High School, graduating in 2023. In the same year, she began attending Mount St. Mary's University.

== Career ==
Carey competed at the 2019 Parapan American Games in the 100m and long jump, where she won the bronze medal in both events. She competed in the 2023 Parapan American Games, where she won the bronze medal in the 100m, 200m and long jump.

Carey competed in four events in the 2024 Summer Paralympics. Her best result was in sixth place in the final of the long jump and 200 metres, setting a Paralympic and American record in these respective events.

Carey competed in the 2025 World Para Athletics Championships held in New Delhi, where she won the silver medal in the 100m T44 event. She then won the gold medal in the 200m T44 event.
