= Anna Steven =

New Zealand athlete

Personal information
- Born: 31 August 2000 (age 25) Auckland, New Zealand

Sport
- Country: New Zealand
- Sport: Para athletics

Anna Steven (born 31 August 2000) is a para-athlete from New Zealand.

== Biography ==
Steven was born in Auckland in 2000. She was educated at Westlake Girls High School on the city's North Shore. As of 2020, she is a student at the University of Auckland, studying biomedical science.

When she was 13 years old, Steven had chemotherapy and surgery to treat osteosarcoma, a type of bone cancer. As a result her lower right leg was amputated. In 2016 she watched Liam Malone compete for New Zealand at the 2016 Summer Paralympics and also met him at a "welcome home" event. She decided to take up athletics and quickly excelled in short sprint distances.

Six months after her first domestic athletics competition, Steven was selected to represent New Zealand at the 2017 World Junior Para Athletics Championships. She competed in the 100 metre and 200 metre events. From 2016 to 2018 Stevens suffered from compartment syndrome in her lower left leg. In August 2018 she underwent a fasciotomy to correct the problem.

In Dubai at the 2019 World Para Athletics Championships, Steven set a new Oceania area record in the Women’s 100m T64, placing 5th in her heat, and placed 7th in the Women’s 200m T64 final.

At the 2020 Summer Paralympics, Steven competed in the 100 metres and 200 metres T64. In the 200 metres, she qualified for the final and finished in eighth place. In the 100 metres, she was disqualified in the heats after making a false start.

== Awards and recognition ==
In 2020 Steven received a Blues Award in Sports from the University of Auckland.
