= Femita Ayanbeku =

American Paralympic athlete

Personal information
- Nickname: Mita
- Born: June 30, 1992 (age 34) Boston, Massachusetts, United States
- Home town: Randolph, Massachusetts

Sport
- Country: United States
- Sport: Paralympic athletics
- Disability class: T64
- Coached by: Sherman Hart
Medal record
Paralympic athletics
Representing United States
World Championships
Bronze medal – third place	2019 Dubai	100m T64

Femita Ayanbeku (born June 30, 1992) is an American Paralympic athlete of Haitian and Nigerian descent, she competes in sprinting events at international track and field competitions. She is a World bronze medalist and has competed at the 2016 and 2020 Summer Paralympics.

== Personal life ==
In July 2003, eleven year old Ayanbeku and her three sisters and cousins were sitting in the back of her cousin's station wagon travelling on the highway in Stoughton, Massachusetts. Her life changed suddenly when the driver lost control and car struck a guardrail and spun around, forcing the doors open. Ayanbeku and one of her sisters were thrown out of the car onto the side of the highway. Ayanbeku's severe injuries required the amputation of her right leg below the knee.

Ayanbeku was inducted as an honorary member of Sigma Gamma Rho on July 24, 2026, at their 61st Biennial Boule in Tampa, Florida.

== Sporting career ==
Following her recovery from the car accident, Ayanbeku tried out basketball in her first year at high school but only did the sport for a short period of time because she had too much discomfort on her prosthetic. She was introduced to the sport by Jerome Singleton when she visited a para track and field open event in November 2015, and introduced his coach Sherman Hart to her. Hart found that Ayanbeku had a raw talent for track and field, so Hart and Singleton took Ayanbeku to one of their training sessions. Ayanbeku describes running as feeling natural and felt that she had two feet again. Hart highly encouraged her to go to Charlotte, North Carolina for the 2016 US Paralympic Team Trials in late June 2016. Ayanbeku qualified for the 2016 Summer Paralympics in the 100 metres and 200 metres.

She qualified for 2020 Summer Paralympics in the 100 metres and 200 metres again, she ran well in her heats but couldn't compete in the finals due to testing positive for COVID-19.

Just six months after giving birth to her daughter, Ayanbeku qualified for the 2024 Paralympics.
