= Irmgard Bensusan =

South African-born German Paralympic sprinter

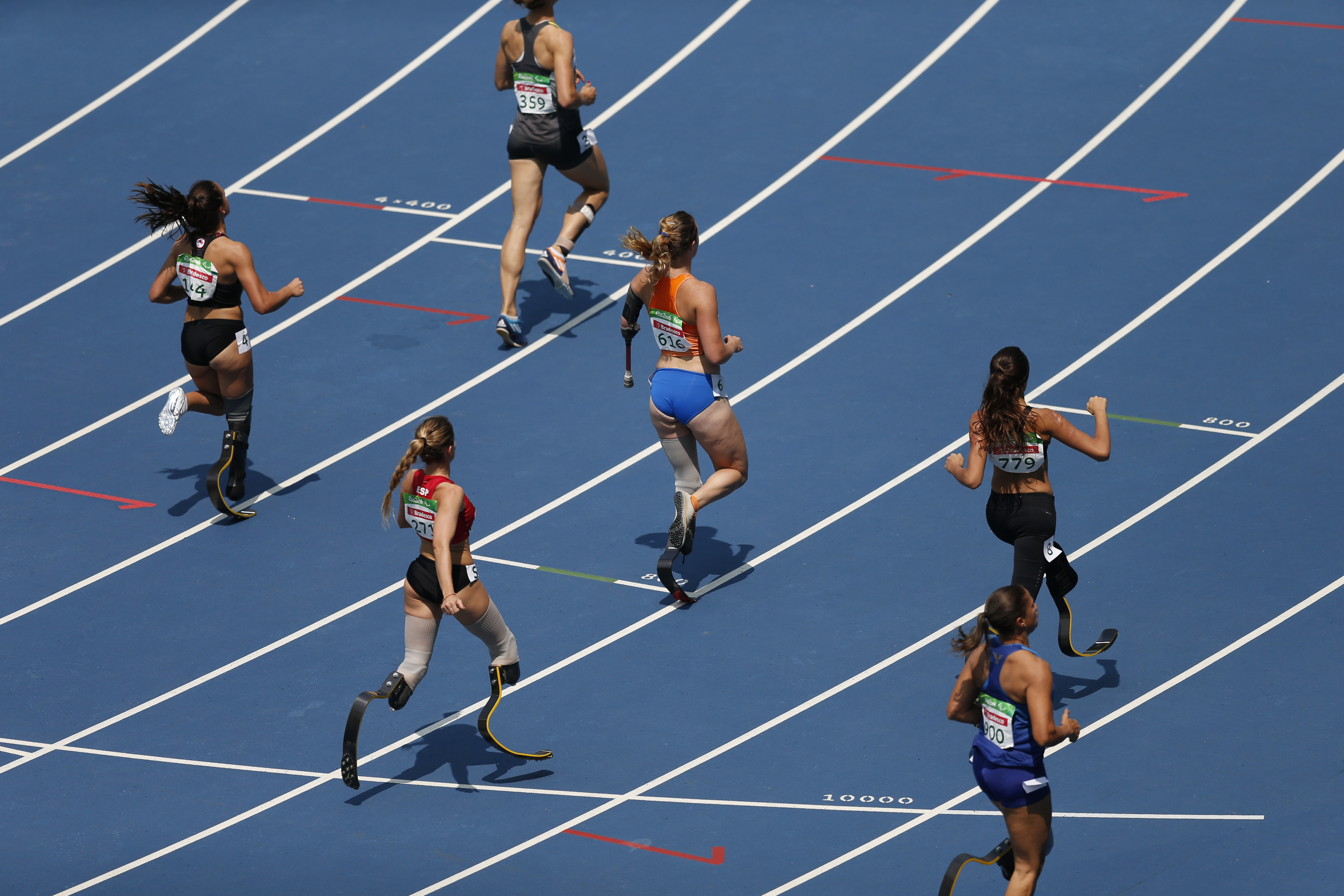
- Competições de Atletismo no Estádio Olímpico

Personal information
- Born: 24 January 1991 (age 35) Pretoria, South Africa

Sport
- Country: Germany
- Sport: Athletics
- Disability class: T44
- Event: Sprints (100, 200, 400 m)
- Club: TSV Bayer 04 Leverkusen
- Coached by: Karl-Heinz Due
Medal record
Women's athletics
Paralympic Games
Silver medal – second place	2016 Rio de Janeiro	100 m T44
Silver medal – second place	2016 Rio de Janeiro	200 m T44
Silver medal – second place	2016 Rio de Janeiro	400 m T44
Silver medal – second place	2020 Tokyo	100 m T64
Silver medal – second place	2020 Tokyo	200 m T64
Bronze medal – third place	2024 Paris	200 m T64
World Championships
Gold medal – first place	2023 Paris	200 m T64
Silver medal – second place	2015 Doha	400 m T44
European Championships
Gold medal – first place	2016 Grosseto	100 m T44
Gold medal – first place	2016 Grosseto	200 m T44
Silver medal – second place	2014 Swansea	100 m T44
Silver medal – second place	2014 Swansea	200 m T44
Silver medal – second place	2014 Swansea	400 m T44
Silver medal – second place	2016 Grosseto	400 m T44

Irmgard Bensusan (born 24 January 1991) is a South African born Paralympic sprinter who now competes for Germany, mainly in T44 classification events. Bensusan competed at the 2016 Summer Paralympics where she won three silver medals in the 100, 200 and 400 metre sprints.

== Personal life ==
Bensusan was born on 24 January 1991 in Pretoria, South Africa. She studied accounting at the University of Johannesburg.

== Athletics career ==
Bensusan first took up athletics as an able-bodied competitor whilst living in South Africa. In 2009 whilst competing in a hurdle event, she tore the nerves in her right knee. The injury resulted in paralysis in her right leg below her knee. Bensusan looked at becoming classified as a para-sport athlete but was unable to gain a classification from the South African Paralympic Committee. As her mother was German she was eligible to represent Germany, and so she travelled to Europe to take up residency in Leverkusen and was subsequently classified as a T44 track and field athlete.

In 2014, she represented Germany at her first major international event, travelling to Swansea in Wales to compete in the 2014 IPC Athletics European Championships. There she won three silver medals, in the 100m, 200m and 400m sprints. In the two shorter events she was beaten by the Dutch 'Blade Babe' Marlou van Rhijn, and in the 400 metres she was beaten by a new world record time by France's Marie-Amélie Le Fur. A year later Bensusan took part in the 2015 IPC Athletics World Championships in Doha.

=== 2016 Summer Paralympics ===
In the buildup to the 2016 Summer Paralympics in Rio, Bensusan took part in her second European Championships, this time in Grosseto, Italy. Bensusan was able to win gold in both the 100m and 200m events. Her times running up to Rio saw Bensusan qualify for all three sprint events at the Summer Paralympics: the 100m, 200m and 400m races. She took silver in all three events, losing the gold medals to van Rhijn (100m and 200m) and Le Fur (400m).

Bensusan won the gold medal in the women's 200 metres T64 event at the 2023 World Para Athletics Championships held in Paris, France.
