= Sara Andrés Barrio =

Spanish Paralympic athlete

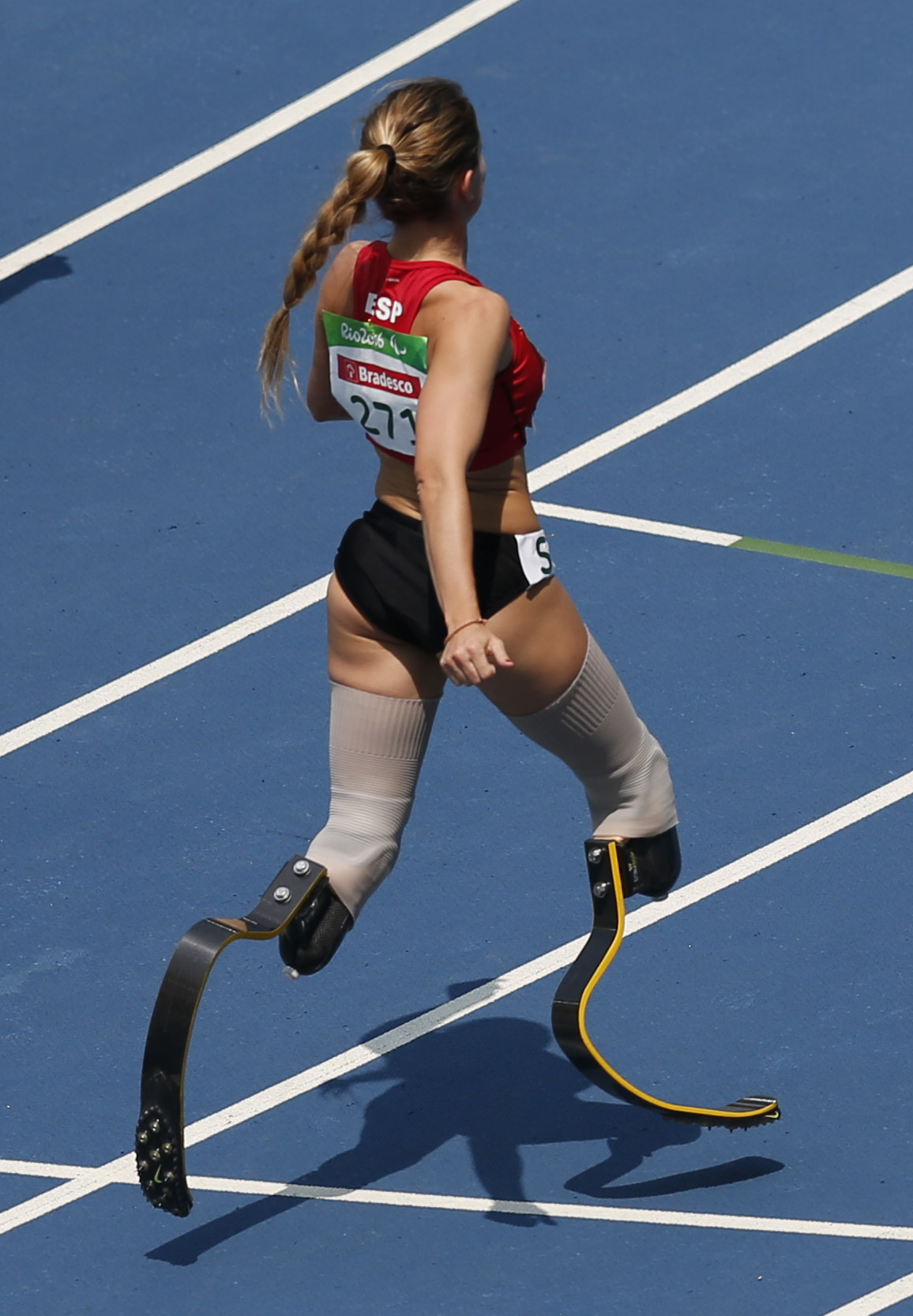

Personal information
- Born: 21 August 1986 (age 39) Madrid, Spain

Sport
- Country: Spain
- Sport: Paralympic athletics
- Disability class: T62
- Event(s): 100 metres 200 metres 400 metres Long jump
- Coached by: Sara Montero
Medal record
Paralympic athletics
Representing Spain
World Championships
Silver medal – second place	2023 Paris	100 m T64
Bronze medal – third place	2017 London	200m T44
Bronze medal – third place	2017 London	400m T44
Bronze medal – third place	2024 Kobe	100m T64
European Championships
Silver medal – second place	2018 Berlin	200m T62
Bronze medal – third place	2021 Bydgoszcz	100m T64

Sara Andrés Barrio (born 21 August 1986) is a Spanish Paralympic athlete who competes in sprinting and long jump events at international track and field competitions, she competed at the 2016 and 2020 Summer Paralympics. She is a three-time World bronze medalist and a European silver medalist in sprinting.

== Personal life ==
Sara lost both of her lower legs in a car accident in 2011, she was an amateur karateka and tennis player before her accident.

Sara has written a children's book, published in 2019 titled "Sabes quien soy?" translated "Do you know who I am?" is a 36-page illustrated book of five characters that have different hobbies and impairments, the book explains how the characters live their day-to-day lives and breaking stereotypes. She also works a primary school teacher in Villanueva de la Cañada, she took a leave of absence in 2019 to prepare and train for the 2020 Summer Paralympics.
