= Beatriz Hatz =

American Paralympic athlete (born 2000)

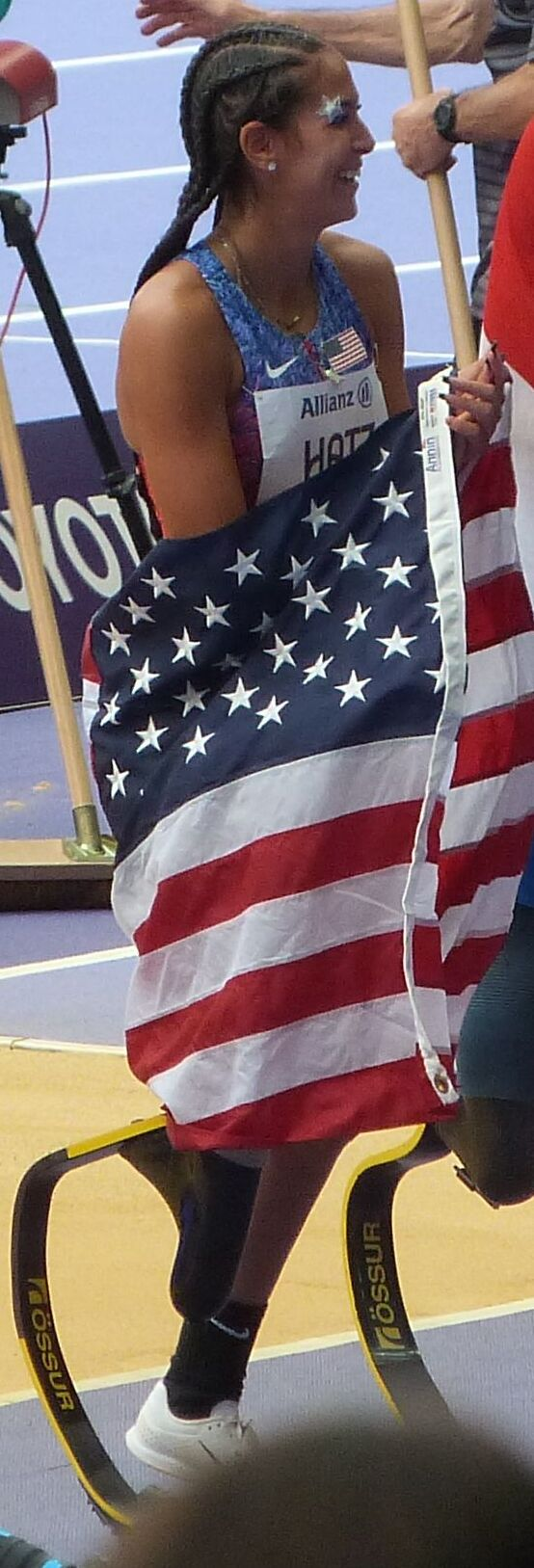
- Hatz in the 2024 Summer Paralympics

Personal information
- Nationality: American
- Born: October 7, 2000 (age 25) Littleton, Colorado, United States
- Home town: Lakewood, Colorado, United States
- Height: 1.70 m (5 ft 7 in)

Sport
- Country: United States
- Sport: Paralympic athletics
- Disability: Fibular hemimelia
- Disability class: T64
- Events: 100 metres 200 metres Long jump
- Coached by: Chris Benard
Medal record
Women's para-athletics
Representing the United States
Paralympic Games
Bronze medal – third place	2024 Paris	Long jump T64
World Championships
Bronze medal – third place	2024 Kobe	200m T64
Bronze medal – third place	2025 New Delhi	Long jump T64
Parapan American Games
Silver medal – second place	2019 Lima	100m T64
Silver medal – second place	2019 Lima	200m T64
Silver medal – second place	2023 Santiago	200m T64
World Junior Championships
Gold medal – first place	2017 Nottwil	100m T42-47
Gold medal – first place	2017 Nottwil	200m T42-47
Silver medal – second place	2017 Nottwil	Long jump F42-47

Beatriz Alexa Hatz (born October 7, 2000) is an American Paralympic athlete who competes in long jump and sprinting events at international track and field competitions.

== Life and career ==
Hatz was born October 7, 2000, to parents John and Beatriz Hatz; she was born without a fibula in her right leg and had the limb amputated below the knee when she was ten months old, she has also had surgical operations to straighten her knees.

Hatz began her athletic career when she was encouraged by a friend to take part in track and field. She was named US Paralympic High School Athlete of the Year in 2018. She made her debut at the 2020 Tokyo Paralympic Games, before winning bronze in the long jump at the Paris 2024 Paralympic Games.

In May 2026, Hatz was announced as an original islander for the eighth season of Love Island USA, making her the first islander of the franchise with a physical impairment. She was dumped from the villa on day 10.

== Filmography ==
Year	Title	Notes	Ref.
2026	Love Island USA	Season 8 Contestant; Dumped Day 10	
