= Abassia Rahmani =

Swiss Paralympic athlete (born 1992)

Personal information
- Nicknames: Swiss Blade Runner, Gazelle
- Born: 2 July 1992 (age 33) Zürich, Switzerland
- Height: 1.70 m (5 ft 7 in)

Sport
- Country: Switzerland
- Sport: Paralympic athletics
- Disability: Meningitis survivor
- Disability class: T62
- Event(s): 100 metres 200 metres
- Club: LV Winterthur
- Coached by: Georg Pfarrwaller
Medal record
Paralympic athletics
Representing Switzerland
European Championships
| Gold medal – first place | 2018 Berlin | Women's 200m T62 |
| Bronze medal – third place | 2016 Grosseto | Women's 100m T44 |

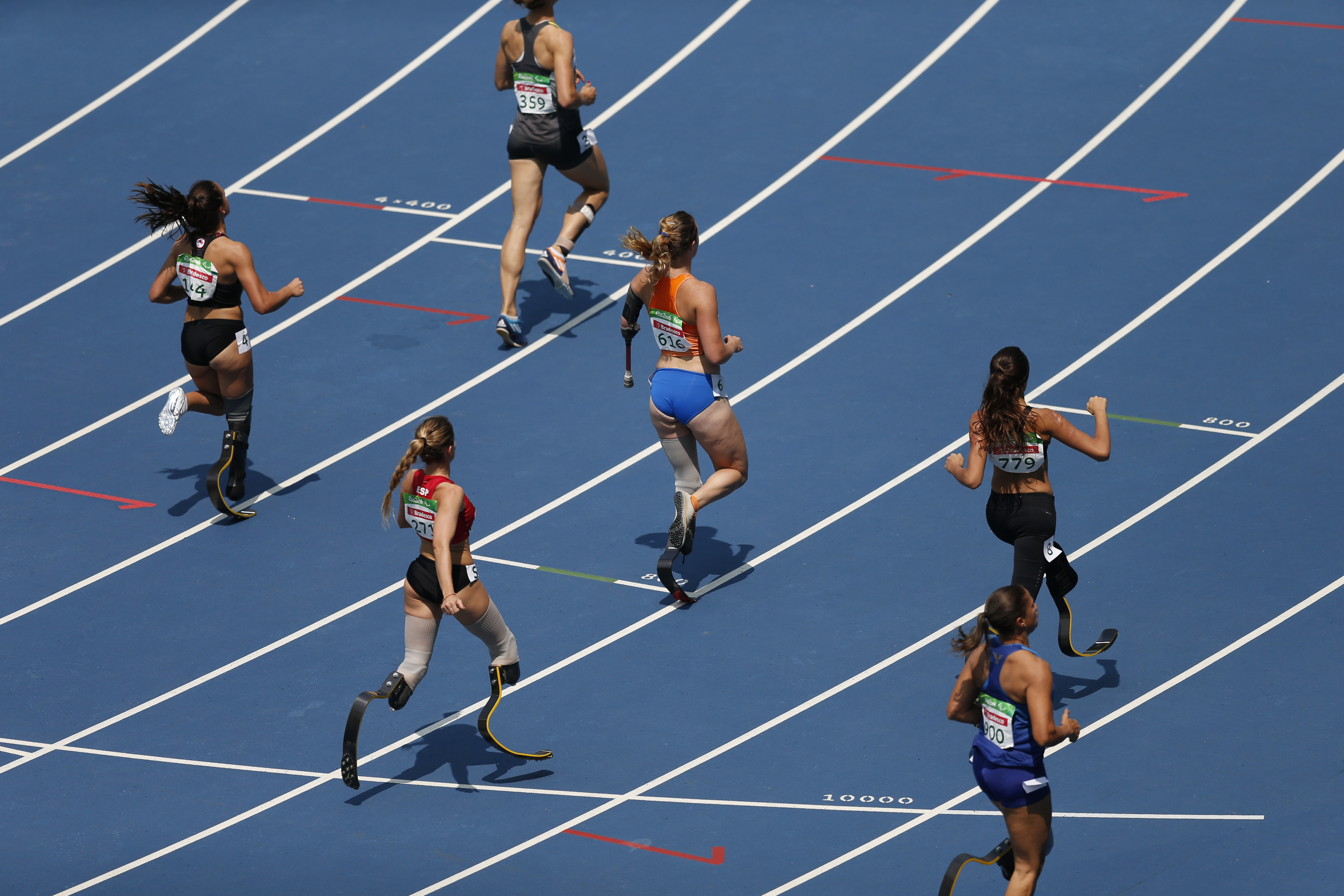
Abassia Rahmani (number 779)

Abassia Rahmani (born 2 July 1992) is a Swiss Paralympic athlete of Algerian descent who competes in international sprinting events.

She was a keen and active person who had an interest in snowboarding, gymnastics, horse riding and track and field. When Rahmani was sixteen, she had both of her legs amputated due to bacterial meningitis but continued her passion in athletics and tried out Paralympic athletics.
