= Athletics at the 2016 Summer Paralympics – Women's long jump =

The women's long jump athletics events for the 2016 Summer Paralympics take place at the Rio Olympic Stadium from 8 September. A total of 8 events are contested for 8 different classifications.

== Competition format ==
The competition for each classification consisted of a single round containing the full field. No qualification heats were organised. During competition, each athlete jumped three times, after which the eight best jumped three more times (with the best distance of the six jumps counted towards the final ranking).

== Medal summary ==
Classification	Gold		Silver		Bronze	
T11	Silvânia Costa de Oliveira; Brazil	4.98	Fatimata Diasso; Ivory Coast	4.89	Lorena Salvatini Spoladore; Brazil	4.71
T12	Oksana Zubkovska; Ukraine	6.11	Elena Chebanu; Azerbaijan	5.56	Lynda Hamri; Algeria	5.53
T20	Mikela Ristoski; Croatia	5.79	Karolina Kucharczyk; Poland	5.55	Siti Noor Radiah Ismail; Malaysia	5.20
T37	Wen Xiaoyan; China	5.14 WR	Franziska Liebhardt; Germany	4.42	Jodi Elkington-Jones; Australia	4.30
T38	Chen Junfei; China	4.77	Taylor Doyle; Australia	4.62	Anna Trener-Wierciak; Poland	4.53
T42	Vanessa Low; Germany	4.93 WR	Martina Caironi; Italy	4.66	Malu Perez Iser; Cuba	3.92
T44	Marie-Amélie Le Fur; France	5.83 WR	Stefanie Reid; Great Britain	5.64	Marlene van Gansewinkel; Netherlands	5.57
T47	Anna Grimaldi; New Zealand	5.62	Yunidis Castillo; Cuba	5.59	Carlee Beattie; Australia	5.57

== Results ==
=== T11 ===
The T11 event took place on 16 September.

Rank	Athlete	1	2	3	4	5	6	Best	Notes
1st place, gold medalist(s)	Silvânia Costa de Oliveira (BRA)	4.66	4.78	4.76	x	4.82	4.98	4.98	
2nd place, silver medalist(s)	Fatimata Diasso (CIV)	x	4.74	4.64	4.89	4.69	4.78	4.89	PB
3rd place, bronze medalist(s)	Lorena Salvatini Spoladore (BRA)	4.51	4.41	4.42	4.71	4.39	x	4.71	SB
4	Jia Juntingxian (CHN)	4.63	4.59	4.50	4.59	x	4.59	4.63	
5	Thalita Vitória Simplício da Silva (BRA)	x	4.54	x	x	1.57	3.72	4.54	
6	Arjola Dedaj (ITA)	x	4.24	4.40	4.38	4.07	4.51	4.51	PB
7	Viktoria Karlsson (SWE)	4.42	4.48	4.33	x	4.49	4.21	4.49	
8	Chiaki Tadaka (JPN)	4.45	x	x	4.16	x	4.41	4.45	PB
9	Ronja Oja (FIN)	4.11	4.02	4.30				4.30	=PB
10	Thi Nhan Nguyen (VIE)	4.01	4.00	3.62				4.01	SB

=== T12 ===
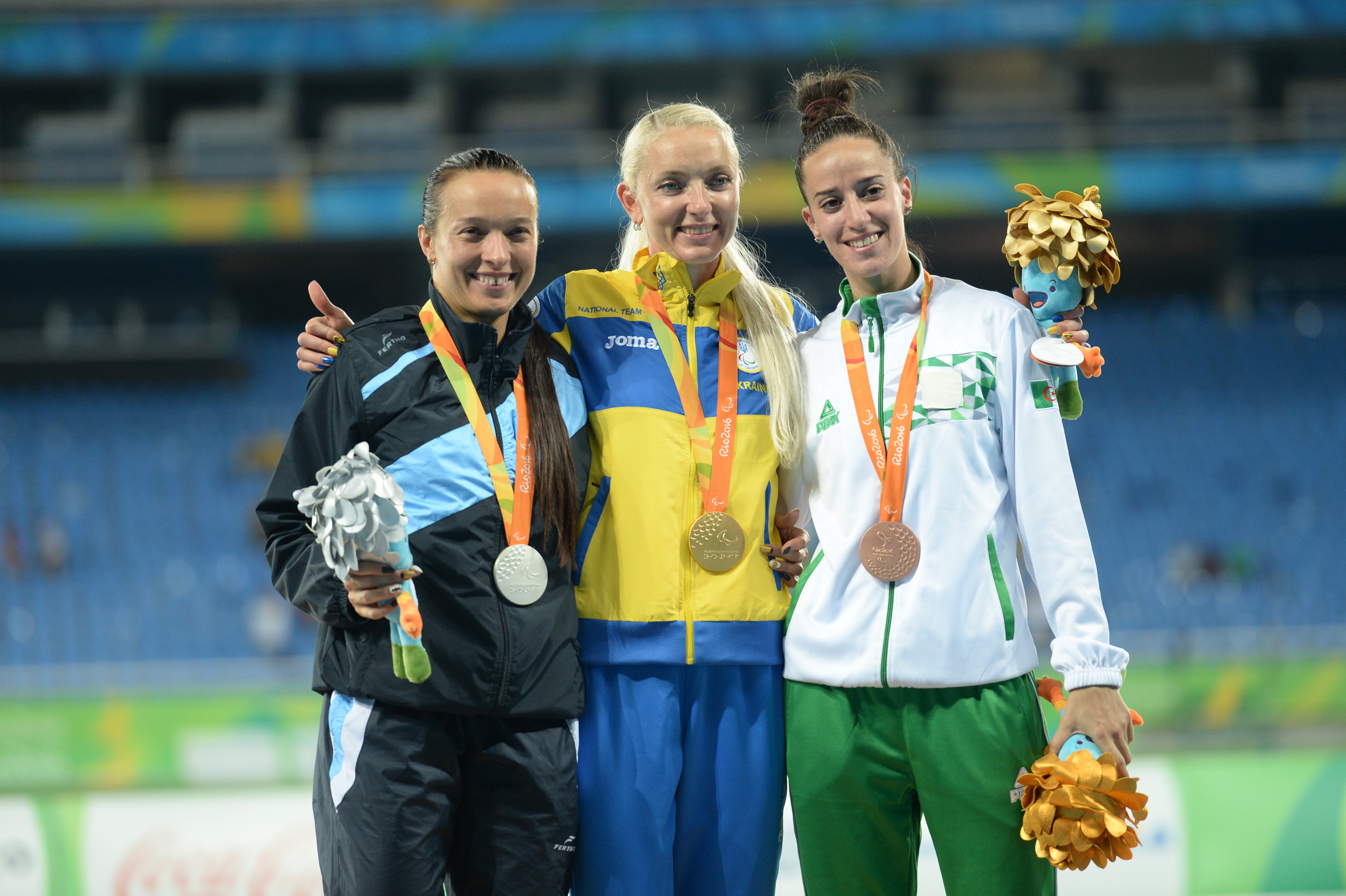
Women's long jump T12 Medalists: Elena Chebanu, Oksana Zubkovska and Lynda Hamri

The T12 event took place on 13 September.

Rank	Athlete	1	2	3	4	5	6	Best	Notes
1st place, gold medalist(s)	Oksana Zubkovska (UKR)	6.09	6.02	–	5.98	–	6.11	6.11	SB
2nd place, silver medalist(s)	Elena Chebanu (AZE)	5.14	5.37	5.35	5.43	5.11	5.56	5.56	PB
3rd place, bronze medalist(s)	Lynda Hamri (ALG)	5.44	5.53'	5.34	5.25	5.38	5.34	5.53	SB
4	Sara Martínez Puntero (ESP)	5.38	x	5.52	5.34	5.31	5.46	5.52	
5	Anna Kaniuk (BLR)	5.36	5.37	5.28	x	5.22	5.45	5.45	
6	Katrin Mueller-Rottgardt (GER)	5.11	5.15	4.92	5.16	5.01	4.98	5.16	
7	Iuliia Korunchak (UKR)	4.99	x	5.01	5.00	4.93	5.01	5.01	SB
8	Sara Fernández Roldán (ESP)	4.24	4.38	4.30	4.47	4.35	4.45	4.47	

=== T20 ===
The T20 event took place on 15 September.

Rank	Athlete	1	2	3	4	5	6	Best	Notes
1st place, gold medalist(s)	Mikela Ristoski (CRO)	5.06	5.40	5.54	5.67	5.50	5.79	5.79	PB
2nd place, silver medalist(s)	Karolina Kucharczyk (POL)	5.07	5.55	5.35	5.41	5.44	5.42	5.55	
3rd place, bronze medalist(s)	Siti Noor Radiah Ismail (MAS)	4.71	5.06	5.20	x	4.74	5.09	5.20	
4	Siti Noor Iasah Mohamad Ariffin (MAS)	4.89	4.70	4.91	4.61	4.22	4.64	4.91	
5	Olena Rozdobudko (UKR)	4.91	4.37	4.64	4.80	4.87	2.51	4.91	SB
6	Norkelys Gonzalez (VEN)	4.39	x	4.45	x	4.52	4.90	4.90	
7	Erica Gomes (POR)	4.67	x	4.53	4.56	x	4.59	4.67	
8	Piroska Csontos (HUN)	4.50	4.32	4.11	4.05	4.03	4.03	4.50	
9	Ana Filipe (POR)	4.31	4.12	3.31				4.31	

=== T37 ===
The T37 event took place on 14 September.

Rank	Athlete	1	2	3	4	5	6	Best	Notes
1st place, gold medalist(s)	Wen Xiaoyan (CHN)	4.92	4.97	5.07	5.14	5.01	4.84	5.14	WR
2nd place, silver medalist(s)	Franziska Liebhardt (GER)	4.42	4.40	4.35	4.23	4.35	x	4.42	
3rd place, bronze medalist(s)	Jodi Elkington-Jones (AUS)	x	4.30	x	x	3.60	4.27	4.30	
4	Maike Hausberger (GER)	3.96	4.06	3.97	4.06	3.86	x	4.06	
5	Neda Bahi (TUN)	4.03	3.69	3.38	3.79	4.03	3.83	4.03	
6	Johanna Benson (NAM)	3.61	3.58	3.60	3.48	3.50	3.56	3.61	
	Rahma Ayachi (TUN)							DNS	

=== T38 ===
The T38 event took place on 11 September.

Rank	Athlete	1	2	3	4	5	6	Best	Notes
1st place, gold medalist(s)	Chen Junfei (CHN)	4.68	4.77	4.72	4.67	4.76	3.56	4.77	PB
2nd place, silver medalist(s)	Taylor Doyle (AUS)	x	4.17	4.62	4.50	4.06	4.42	4.62	
3rd place, bronze medalist(s)	Anna Trener-Wierciak (POL)	4.53	x	4.39	4.16	4.43	x	4.53	
4	Ramune Adomaitiene (LTU)	4.30	4.50	4.52	4.45	4.43	4.42	4.52	
5	Erin Cleaver (AUS)	4.43	4.51	4.46	4.43	4.32	4.47	4.51	
6	Lindy Ave (GER)	4.47	4.17	4.08	4.14	4.24	4.14	4.47	PB
7	Jenifer Santos (BRA)	4.43	4.30	4.43	4.25	4.26	4.12	4.43	
8	Verônica Hipólito (BRA)	4.37	3.97	3.85	3.98	4.16	–	4.37	
9	Inna Stryzhak (UKR)	x	4.20	4.34				4.34	
10	Nicole Nicoleitzik (GER)	4.05	3.30	3.73				4.05	
11	Maria Fernandes (POR)	4.04	4.01	x				4.04	
12	Olivia Breen (GBR)	x	x	3.99				3.99	
13	Vanessa Braun (GER)	3.98	3.59	x				3.98	=PB

=== T42 ===
The T42 event took place on 10 September.

Rank	Athlete	1	2	3	4	5	6	Best	Notes
1st place, gold medalist(s)	Vanessa Low (GER)	4.76	4.88	4.93	4.90	x	4.43	4.93	WR
2nd place, silver medalist(s)	Martina Caironi (ITA)	4.54	4.60	4.57	4.44	4.66	4.49	4.66	PB
3rd place, bronze medalist(s)	Malu Perez Iser (CUB)	3.72	3.73	3.77	3.87	3.92	x	3.92	
4	Kaede Maegawa (JPN)	x	2.89	3.50	3.68	x	3.45	3.68	
5	Ana Claudia Silva (BRA)	3.62	x	x	x	3.58	x	3.62	
6	Hitomi Onishi (JPN)	3.46	3.32	3.58	3.53	3.50	3.18	3.58	PB
7	Jana Schmidt (GER)	3.52	x	3.47	3.51	3.53	x	3.53	
8	Lacey Henderson (USA)	3.32	x	3.19	3.19	3.29	3.33	3.33	
9	Livia de Clercq (BEL)	2.94	2.96	2.99				2.99	
10	Scout Bassett (USA)	x	x	2.94				2.94	

=== T44 ===
The T44 event took place on 9 September. The event incorporates athletes from classification T43 in addition to T44.

Rank	Athlete	1	2	3	4	5	6	Best	Notes
1st place, gold medalist(s)	Marie-Amélie Le Fur (FRA)	5.75	5.62	5.71	5.83	5.63	5.83	5.83	WR
2nd place, silver medalist(s)	Stefanie Reid (GBR)	5.64	5.49	x	x	x	5.50	5.64	
3rd place, bronze medalist(s)	Marlene van Gansewinkel (NED)	5.31	5.54	5.12	5.57	4.87	5.34	5.57	PB
4	Maya Nakanishi (JPN)	x	5.38	x	5.16	5.05	5.42	5.42	
5	Saki Takakuwa (JPN)	x	4.67	4.66	x	4.63	4.95	4.95	
6	Sarah Walsh (AUS)	4.65	4.82	4.57	4.46	4.73	4.46	4.82	
7	Iris Pruysen (NED)	x	x	4.56	4.52	4.47	4.37	4.56	

=== T47 ===
The T47 event took place on 8 September. The event incorporates athletes from classifications T45 and T46 in addition to T47.

Rank	Athlete	1	2	3	4	5	6	Best	Notes
1st place, gold medalist(s)	Anna Grimaldi (NZL)	5.34	5.43	5.43	5.45	x	5.62	5.62	PB
2nd place, silver medalist(s)	Yunidis Castillo (CUB)	5.38	5.59	–	5.50	x	5.56	5.59	
3rd place, bronze medalist(s)	Carlee Beattie (AUS)	5.37	5.38	5.23	x	5.57	x	5.57	
4	Angelina Lanza (FRA)	5.07	5.24	5.06	x	5.30	x	5.30	PB
5	Taleah Williams (USA)	5.07	4.97	4.86	5.03	5.17	5.06	5.17	
6	Amy Watt (USA)	5.15	x	4.74	4.97	4.88	4.99	5.15	
7	Polly Maton (GBR)	5.10	5.01	4.86	4.64	4.93	4.83	5.10	
8	Katarzyna Piekart (POL)	4.90	5.05	5.05	4.96	4.27	4.77	5.05	
9	Sheila Finder (BRA)	4.95	5.00	4.99				5.00	
10	Styliani Smaragdi (GRE)	4.87	4.84	4.83				4.87	
11	Aldana Ibanez (ARG)	x	4.46	4.60				4.60	
12	Amara Lallwala Palliyagurunnans (SRI)	x	4.09	x				4.09	
