= 2018 World Para Athletics European Championships – Women's long jump =

The women's long jump at the 2018 World Para Athletics European Championships was held at the Friedrich-Ludwig-Jahn-Sportpark in Berlin from 20–26 August. 8 finals were held in this event.

== Medalists ==
Event	Gold		Silver		Bronze	
T11	Viktoria Karlsson (SWE)	4.77 CR	Meritxell Playa Faus (ESP)	4.73	Ronja Oja (FIN)	4.26
T12	Sara Martinez (ESP)	5.42	Katrin Mueller-Rottgardt (GER)	5.06	Anna Kaniuk (BLR)	5.04
T20	Karolina Kucharczyk (POL)	6.14 WR	Érica Gomes (POR)	5.68	Mikela Ristoski (CRO)	5.52
T37	Marta Piotrowska (POL)	4.51 CR	Bergrun Osk Adelsteinsdottir (ISL)	4.16	Natalia Jasinska (UKR)	3.83
T38	Luca Ekler (HUN)	5.39 CR	Lindy Ave (GER)	4.71	Anna Trener-Wierciak (POL)	4.58
T47	Angelina Lanza (FRA)	5.62	Styliani Smaragdi (GRE)	5.04	Polly Maton (GBR)	5.04
T63	Martina Caironi (ITA)	4.91	Gitte Haenen (BEL)	4.30	Fleur Schouten (NED)	3.77
T64	Marie-Amelie Le Fur (FRA)	6.01 WR	Marlene van Gansewinkel (NED)	5.61	Stef Reid (GBR)	5.49
WR world record | AR area record | CR championship record | GR games record | NR national record | OR Olympic record | PB personal best | SB season best | WL world leading (in a given season)

== Results ==
=== T11 ===
Rank	Athlete	Result	Notes
1st place, gold medalist(s)	Viktoria Karlsson; Sweden	4.77	CR
2nd place, silver medalist(s)	Meritxell Playa Faus; Spain	4.73	
3rd place, bronze medalist(s)	Ronja Oja; Finland	4.26	
4	Lia Beel Quintaña; Spain	3.54	

=== T12 ===
Rank	Athlete	Result	Notes
1st place, gold medalist(s)	Sara Martinez; Spain	5.42	
2nd place, silver medalist(s)	Katrin Mueller-Rottgardt; Germany	5.06	
3rd place, bronze medalist(s)	Anna Kaniuk; Belarus	5.04	
4	Sara Fernandez Roldan; Spain	4.92	
5	Alba Garcia Falagan; Spain	4.12	

=== T20 ===
Rank	Athlete	Result	Notes
1st place, gold medalist(s)	Karolina Kucharczyk; Poland	6.14	WR
2nd place, silver medalist(s)	Érica Gomes; Portugal	5.68	
3rd place, bronze medalist(s)	Mikela Ristoski; Croatia	5.52	
4	Martina Barber; United Kingdom	5.31	
5	Esra Bayrak; Turkey	5.27	
6	Olha Zazuliah; Ukraine	5.02	
7	Piroska Csontos; Hungary	4.94	
8	Cláudia Santos; Portugal	4.94	
9	Stefania Gudmundsdottir; Iceland	4.62	
10	Ana Filipe; Portugal	3.94	
11	Veronika Skuhrovska; Czech Republic	3.69	

=== T37 ===
Rank	Athlete	Result	Notes
1st place, gold medalist(s)	Marta Piotrowska; Poland	4.51	CR
2nd place, silver medalist(s)	Bergrun Adalsteinsdottir; Iceland	4.16	
3rd place, bronze medalist(s)	Natalia Jasinska; Poland	3.83	
4	Francesca Cipelli; Italy	3.81	
5	Annegret Schneider; Germany	3.17	

=== T38 ===
Rank	Athlete	Result	Notes
1st place, gold medalist(s)	Luca Ekler; Hungary	5.39	CR
2nd place, silver medalist(s)	Lindy Ave; Germany	4.71	
3rd place, bronze medalist(s)	Anna Trener-Wierciak; Poland	4.58	
4	Ali Smith; United Kingdom	4.34	
5	Ramune Adomaitiene; Lithuania	4.21	
6	Maria Fernandes; Portugal	4.14	

=== T47 ===
Rank	Athlete	Result	Notes
1st place, gold medalist(s)	Angelina Lanza; France	5.62	
2nd place, silver medalist(s)	Styliani Smaragdi; Greece	5.42	
3rd place, bronze medalist(s)	Polly Maton; United Kingdom	5.28	
4	Laurence Fibleuil; France	4.76	
5	Esra Genc; Turkey	4.36	
–	Katarzyna Piekart; Poland	DNS	

=== T63 ===
Rank	Athlete	Result	Notes
1st place, gold medalist(s)	Martina Caironi; Italy	4.91	
2nd place, silver medalist(s)	Gitte Haenen; Belgium	4.30	
3rd place, bronze medalist(s)	Fleur Schouten; Netherlands	3.77	
4	Annette Roozen; Netherlands	3.77	
5	Orianne Lopez; France	3.26	
6	Desiree Vila Bargiela; Spain	2.74	

=== T64 ===
Rank	Athlete	Result	Notes
1st place, gold medalist(s)	Marie-Amelie Le Fur; France	6.01	WR
2nd place, silver medalist(s)	Marlene van Gansewinkel; Netherlands	5.61	
3rd place, bronze medalist(s)	Stef Reid; United Kingdom	5.49	
4	Maria Tietze; Germany	4.55	

== See also ==
- List of IPC world records in athletics
