= 2017 World Para Athletics Championships – Women's long jump =

The women's long jump at the 2017 World Para Athletics Championships was held at the Olympic Stadium in London from 14 to 23 July.

== Medalists ==
Event	Gold		Silver		Bronze	
T11	Arjola Dedaj; Italy	4.65	Chiaki Takada; Japan	4.49 PB	Zhong Huimin; China	4.44 PB
T12	Oksana Zubkovska; Ukraine	6.02 SB	Sara Martinez; Spain	5.53 =SB	Lynda Hamri; Algeria	5.42
T20	Mikela Ristoski; Croatia	5.66 SB	Erica Gomes; Portugal	5.48 PB	Ana Filipe; Portugal	5.26 PB
T37	Wen Xiaoyan; China	4.97 CR	Jaleen Roberts; United States	4.60 AR	Marta Piotrowska; Poland	4.37 PB
T38	Olivia Breen; Great Britain	4.81 PB	Erin Cleaver; Australia	4.61	Anna Trener-Wierciak; Poland	4.60
T42	Martina Caironi; Italy	4.72 PB	Kaede Maegawa; Japan	3.79	Scout Bassett; United States	3.45
T44	Stef Reid; Great Britain	5.40	Marlene van Gansewinkel; Netherlands	5.29	Maya Nakanishi; Japan	5.00
T47	Taleah Williams; United States	5.27	Polly Maton; Great Britain	5.23 PB	Angelina Lanza; France	5.22
WR world record | AR area record | CR championship record | GR games record | NR national record | OR Olympic record | PB personal best | SB season best | WL world leading (in a given season)

Events listed in pink were contested but no medals were awarded.

== Detailed results ==
=== T20 ===
Rank	Athlete	1	2	3	4	5	6	Best	Notes
1st place, gold medalist(s)	Mikela Ristoski (CRO)	5.66	5.42	5.59	x	x	5.50	5.66	SB
2nd place, silver medalist(s)	Erica Gomes (POR)	5.06	5.02	5.19	5.11	5.48	4.99	5.48	PB
3rd place, bronze medalist(s)	Ana Felipe (POR)	x	5.07	5.07	5.09	5.26	4.92	5.26	PB
4	Martina Barber (GBR)	4.76	4.93	4.81	x	5.17	5.16	5.17	PB
5	Esra Bayrak (TUR)	5.03	4.68	4.88	4.92	4.84	4.74	5.03	PB
6	Csontos Piroska (HUN)	4.84	4.90	x	4.75	4.73	5.01	5.01	SB
7	Siti Noor Radiah Ismail (MAS)	4.76	4.96	4.62	4.75	4.64	2.85	4.96	
8	Veronika Skuhrovska (CZE)	4.66	4.92	4.87	4.67	4.54	4.92	4.92	PB
9	Claudia Santos (POR)	x	4.32	4.66				4.28	
10	Anais Maribel Lara Borja (ECU)	4.22	4.51	-				4.51	PB
11	Emma Eriksson (SWE)	4.49	x	4.37				4.49	
12	Stephanie Ydstrom (SWE)	4.07	4.00	3.88				4.07	

=== T37 ===
Rank	Athlete	1	2	3	4	5	6	Best	Notes
1st place, gold medalist(s)	Wen Xiaoyan (CHN)	4.62	4.59	4.97	4.71	4.55	4.83	4.97	CR
2nd place, silver medalist(s)	Jaleen Roberts (USA)	4.37	4.34	4.39	4.20	4.60	4.35	4.60	AR
3rd place, bronze medalist(s)	Marta Piotrowska (POL)	x	4.11	4.17	4.37	4.17	4.25	4.37	PB
4	Neda Bahi (TUN)	x	4.09	3.97	4.06	3.80	3.72	4.09	

=== T38 ===
Rank	Athlete	1	2	3	4	5	6	Best	Notes
1st place, gold medalist(s)	Olivia Breen (GBR)	4.61	x	4.72	4.81	x	4.75	4.81	PB
2nd place, silver medalist(s)	Erin Cleaver (AUS)	4.59	4.54	4.61	4.44	4.50	4.43	4.61	
3rd place, bronze medalist(s)	Anna Trener-Wierciak (POL)	x	x	x	4.60	x	x	4.60	
4	Lindy Ave (GER)	x	4.34	4.57	4.36	4.34	x	4.85	PB
5	Ramunė Adomaitienė (LTU)	4.47	4.47	4.39	4.50	4.20	4.43	4.50	
6	Maria Fernandes (POR)	3.85	x	3.91	4.28	3.87	-	4.28	SB

=== T42 ===
Rank	Athlete	1	2	3	4	5	6	Best	Notes
1st place, gold medalist(s)	Martina Caironi (ITA)	4.62	4.54	4.40	4.57	4.71	4.72	4.72	PB
2nd place, silver medalist(s)	Kaede Maegawa (JPN)	x	x	x	3.43	3.61	3.79	3.79	
3rd place, bronze medalist(s)	Scout Bassett (USA)	3.23	x	3.36	3.30	3.45	x	3.45	
4	Hitomi Onishi (JPN)	3.34	3.07	3.37	3.29	x	x	3.37	
5	Sakaya Murakami (JPN)	x	3.08	3.22	3.14	3.17	3.16	3.22	
6	Livia de Clercq (BEL)	3.16	3.12	3.03	x	x	x	3.16	

=== T44 ===
Rank	Athlete	1	2	3	4	5	6	Best	Notes
1st place, gold medalist(s)	Stefanie Reid (GBR)	5.18	5.23	5.40	5.30	5.14	5.21	5.40	
2nd place, silver medalist(s)	Marlene van Gansewinkel (NED)	5.05	4.95	5.00	5.29	5.09	5.22	5.29	
3rd place, bronze medalist(s)	Maya Nakanishi (JPN)	x	4.28	x	4.65	4.65	5.00	5.00	
4	Sarah Walsh (AUS)	x	x	4.67	4.83	4.85	x	4.85	AR
5	Saki Takakuwa (JPN)	4.54	4.46	4.80	x	4.64	x	4.80	
6	Nyoshia Cain (TTO)	3.99	x	3.32	x	2.67	-	3.99	

=== T47 ===
Rank	Athlete	1	2	3	4	5	6	Best	Notes
1st place, gold medalist(s)	Taleah Williams (USA)	5.04	5.17	x	5.00	5.27	-	5.27	
2nd place, silver medalist(s)	Polly Maton (GBR)	5.06	4.96	x	5.11	x	5.23	5.23	PB
3rd place, bronze medalist(s)	Angelina Lanza (FRA)	4.97	4.61	x	5.03	x	5.22	5.22	
4	Anna Grimaldi (NZL)	5.18	4.97	x	5.09	5.21	x	5.21	
5	Styliani Smaragdi (GRE)	4.97	x	5.02	5.00	4.91	4.86	5.02	
6	Dilba Tanrikulu (TUR)	4.60	x	4.87	4.84	4.82	x	4.87	PB
7	Amara Lallwala Palliyagurunnans (SRI)	4.20	4.42	-	-	-	-	4.42	

== See also ==
- List of IPC world records in athletics
