= Athletics at the 2016 Summer Paralympics – Women's 100 metres T42 =

Women's 100 metres T42 at the XV Paralympic Games
- Venue: Estádio Olímpico João Havelange
- Dates: 17 September 2016
- Competitors: 12 from 8 nations

Medalists
1st place, gold medalist(s)		Martina Caironi	Italy
2nd place, silver medalist(s)		Vanessa Low	Germany
3rd place, bronze medalist(s)		Monica Graziana Contrafatto	Italy

The T42 category is for single above-knee amputees and athletes with other impairments that are comparable to a single above knee amputation, including athletes with loss of muscle power in the lower limbs.

The Athletics at the 2016 Summer Paralympics – Women's 100 metres T42 event at the 2016 Paralympic Games took place on 17 September 2016, at the Estádio Olímpico João Havelange.

== Heats ==
=== Heat 1 ===
11:56 17 September 2016:

Rank	Lane	Bib	Name	Nationality	Reaction	Time	Notes
1	4	447	Martina Caironi	Italy		14.80	Q
2	3	891	Scout Bassett	United States		16.53	Q
3	6	374	Jana Schmidt	Germany		16.70	Q
4	7	468	Kaede Maegawa	Japan		17.05	q
5	5	344	Julie Rogers	Great Britain		17.41	
6	8	69	Livia de Clercq	Belgium		19.85	

=== Heat 2 ===
12:02 17 September 2016:

Rank	Lane	Bib	Name	Nationality	Reaction	Time	Notes
1	6	369	Vanessa Low	Germany		15.76	Q
2	8	448	Monica Graziana Contrafatto	Italy		16.20	Q
3	5	118	Ana Claudia Silva	Brazil		16.42	Q
4	4	474	Hitomi Onishi	Japan		17.24	q
5	7	899	Lacey Henderson	United States		18.48	
	3	243	Malu Perez Iser	Cuba			DSQ

== Final ==
19:52 17 September 2016:

Rank	Lane	Bib	Name	Nationality	Reaction	Time	Notes
1st place, gold medalist(s)	5	447	Martina Caironi	Italy		14.97	
2nd place, silver medalist(s)	6	369	Vanessa Low	Germany		15.17	
3rd place, bronze medalist(s)	7	448	Monica Graziana Contrafatto	Italy		16.30	
4	9	118	Ana Claudia Silva	Brazil		16.43	
5	4	891	Scout Bassett	United States		16.66	
6	8	374	Jana Schmidt	Germany		16.84	
7	3	468	Kaede Maegawa	Japan		17.39	
8	2	474	Hitomi Onishi	Japan		17.51	
