= Esra Bayrak =

Turkish Paralympic athlete (born 1998)

Personal information
- Full name: Esra Bayrak
- Nationality: Turkish
- Born: Esra Bayrak; 25 December 1998 (age 27) Çarşamba, Samsun, Turkey

Sport
- Country: Turkey
- Sport: Para-athletics
- Disability class: T20
- Event(s): Long jump, 100 m
- Club: Samsun ÖY GSK
- Coached by: Aytunç Göz
Medal record
Women's long jump, sprint
Representing Turkey
Global Games
Gold medal – first place	2023 Vichy	4x100 m relay
Bronze medal – third place	2023 Vichy	long jump
World Championships
Silver medal – second place	2021 Bydgoszcz	100 m
Bronze medal – third place	2021 Bydgoszcz	long jump
World Indoor Championships
Gold medal – first place	2018 Val-de-Reuil	60 m
European Championships
Gold medal – first place	2024 Uppsala	100 m
Gold medal – first place	2024 Uppsala	4x100 m relay
Gold medal – first place	2024 Uppsala	4x400 m relay
Bronze medal – third place	2024 Uppsala	long jump
European Indoor Championships
Gold medal – first place	2019 Istanbul	60 m
World Junior Championships
Gold medal – first place	Nottwil	long jump

Esra Bayrak (born 25 December 1998) is a Turkish Paralympian athlete. She competes in the T20 disability class of mainly long jump and 100 m events. She has won world and European champion titles in various para-athletics disciplines.

== Early years in sport ==
Bayrak started her sport career with athletics in her hometown Çarşamba in 2014. Her coach took her to a national competition in Samsun in 2015. Her success enabled her admission to the national team. Her coach Aytunç Göz financially supported her and her family, and moved them to Samsun city in order to enable her to exercise and to continue her education. Bayrak shared her apartment with three other young sportswomen, who were also national athletes.

In 2016, she debuted internationally, competing at the INAS European Athletics Championships held in Ankara, Turkey. She competed in the 100 m event, and won.

== Career ==
Bayrak is a member of Samsun ÖY GSK, where she is coached by Aytunç Göz.

=== 2017 ===
Bayrak competed in the long jump at the 2017 World Para Athletics Championships in London, Great Britain, and ranked fifth with her personal best distance of 5.03 m.

She won the gold medal in the long jump event with 5.17 m at the 2017 IPC World Para Athletics Junior Championships in Nottwil, Switzerland. She also set a new world junior record.

=== 2018 ===
Bayrak became world champion in the 60 m event at the 2018 World Intellectual Impairment Sport Indoor Athletics Championships in Val-de-Reuil, France.

At the 2018 World Para Athletics European Championships in Berlin, Germany, she improved her long jump mark to 5.27 m and ranked fifth.

=== 2019 ===
In 2019, Bayrak became European champion in the 60 m event at the 9th INAS Open European Indoor Athletics Championships in Istanbul, Turkey.

She claimed the gold medal in all nine meetings of the World Para Athletics Grand Prix series.

Bayrak improved her long jump mark to 5.38 m, and ranked in fifth place again.

She competed in the long jump event at the 2019 World Para Athletics Championships in Dubai, United Arab Emirates.

=== 2020 ===
In 2020, Bayrak was named Best Athlete of the Year.

She represented her country at the 2020 Summer Paralympics in Tokyo, Japan, and won fourth place in the long jump event with 5.37 m.

=== 2021 ===
At the 2021 Virtus European Indoor Athletics Championships in Nantes, France, Bayrak was named the Best Female Athlete of the Championships.

She won the silver medal in the 100 m with 13.30, and the bronze medal in the long jump event with 5.36 m at the 2021 Virtus World Athletics Championships in Bydgoszcz, Poland.

=== 2023 ===
She claimed the gold medal with her teammates Akın, Altın, Gezer and Yıldırım in the 4x100 m relay event with 51.86 at the 2023 Virtus Global Games in Vichy, France. She finished the 100 m individual event on the fourth place. In the long jump, she won the bronze medal with 5.49 m.

At the 2023 World Para Athletics Championships in Paris, France, she did her season's best in the long jump event with 5.39 m, and ranked sixth.

=== 2024 ===
She captured the gold medal in the 100 m individual event with 12.98 at the 2024 Virtus Open European Athletics Championships in Uppsala, Sweden. She claimed more gold medals in the 4x100 m relay with 49.92 and 4x400 m relay events with 4:09.91 along teammates Taşdelen, Önder and Altın. In the long jump, she won the bronze medal with 5.45 m.

Bayrak received a quota for participation at the 2024 Summer Paralympics in Paris, France.

== Personal life ==
Bayrak was born in Çarşamba district of amsın on 25 December 1998.
