= Reyhan Taşdelen =

Turkish Paralympic athlete (born 2007)

Personal information
- Nationality: Turkish
- Born: 29 September 2007 (age 18) Ankara, Turkey

Sport
- Country: Turkey
- Sport: Para-athletics
- Disability class: T20
- Event(s): Long jump, sprint
- Club: Samsun ÖY GSK
- Coached by: Aytunç Göz
Medal record
Women's long jump, sprint
Representing Turkey}
World Grand Prix
Silver medal – second place	2024 Dubai	400 m
Virtus World Indoor Athletics
Bronze medal – third place	2024 Reims	200 m
Silver medal – second place	2024 Reims	800 m NR
Gold medal – first place	2024 Reims	4x200 m} relay WR
Silver medal – second place	2024 Reims	4x400 m relay
European Championships
Gold medal – first place	2024 Uppsala	400 m
Gold medal – first place	2024 Uppsala	4x100 m relay
Gold medal – first place	2024 Uppsala	4x400 m relay

Reyhan Taşdelen (born 29 September 2007) is a Turkish Paralympian athlete. She competes in the T20 disability class of mainly long jump and sprint events, sometimes also in normal athletics competitions. She is owner of world and European champion titles in various para-athletics disciplines.

== Sport career ==
Taşdelen started athletics with the encouragement of her teacher in 2019. After her champion titles in the 200 m and 300 m events at the Turkish U16 Championships, she was admitted to the Olympics Preparation Centers of Turkey. She is a member of Samsun ÖY GSK, where she is coached by Aytunç Göz.

=== 2024 ===
Taşdelen became Turkish champion in the 100 m and 200 m events.

She won the silver medal in the 400 m event at the 2024 World Para Athletics Grand Prix in Dubai, United Arab Emirates.,

At the 2024 Virtus World Indoor Athletics in Reims, France, she won the e bronze medal in the 200 m and the silver medal in the 800 m event while setting a new national record. She captured the gold medal in the 4x200 m relay event with teammates Önder, Bayrak and Altın setting a world record with 1:46.82, which replaced the 2007-record of 1:49.13 from Poland. Further, she took the silver medal in the 4x400 m relay with Önder, Yıldırım and Altın.

Taşdelen competed at the 2024 World Para Athletics Championships in Kobe, Japan, and finished both events long jump and 400 m on the fourth place.

She competed at the national team selection championships in İzmir for the Balkan Athletics U18 Championships, and won the gold medal in the 100 m event. She so was admitted to the national normal athletics team as a first in the country's history.

At the 2024 Virtus Open European Athletics Championships in Uppsala, Sweden, she claimed the gold medal in the 400 m

She won the gold medal in the 400 m hurdles event at the 2024 Virtus Open European Athletics Championships in Uppsala, Sweden. Moreover, she claimed gold medals in the 4x100 m relay with 49.92 and 4x400 m relay events with 4:09.91 along teammates Bayrak, Önder and Altın. In the long jump, she took the bronze medal with 5.45 m.

Taşdelen competed as a normal athlete at the 2024 European Athletics U18 Championships in Banská Bystrica, Slovakia, and set a national record.

She received a quota for participation in the long jump T20 event at the 2024 Summer Paralympics in Paris, France.

== Personal life ==
Reyhan Taşdelen was born on 29 September 2007. In 2022, she moved from Ankara to Samsun upon invitation of Melik Kılıç Göz, sports coordinator of the Uğur Schools. Taşdelen is student of Uğur Schools in Canik, Samsun.
