= Anna Trener-Wierciak =

Polish Paralympic athlete (born 1991)

Personal information
- Born: 31 March 1991 (age 35)

Sport
- Country: Poland
- Sport: Para-athletics
- Disability: Multiple sclerosis
- Disability class: T38
- Events: Long jump; 100 metres
Medal record
Paralympic Games
Bronze medal – third place	2016 Rio de Janeiro	Long jump T38
World Championships
Bronze medal – third place	2017 London	Long jump T38
European Championships
Bronze medal – third place	2018 Berlin	Long jump T38

Anna Trener-Wierciak (born 31 March 1991) is a Polish Paralympic athlete with multiple sclerosis. She represented Poland at the 2016 Summer Paralympics in Rio de Janeiro, Brazil and she won the bronze medal in the women's long jump T38 event. She also competed in the women's 100 metres T38 where she did not qualify to compete in the final.

== Career ==
At the 2017 World Para Athletics Championships held in London, United Kingdom, she won the bronze medal in the women's long jump T38 event.

In 2017, at the World Para Athletics Grand Prix in Tunis, Tunisia, she won the gold medal in the women's women’s long jump T12/20/37/38 event and in the women's 100 metres T36/37/38 event.

At the 2018 World Para Athletics European Championships held in Berlin, Germany, she won the bronze medal in the women's long jump T38 event.

== Achievements ==
Year	Competition	Venue	Position	Event	Notes
Representing Poland
2016	Summer Paralympics	Rio de Janeiro, Brazil	3rd	Long jump	4.53
2017	World Championships	London, United Kingdom	3rd	Long jump	4.60
2018	European Championships	Berlin, Germany	3rd	Long jump	4.58
