= Erin Cleaver =

Australian Paralympic athlete

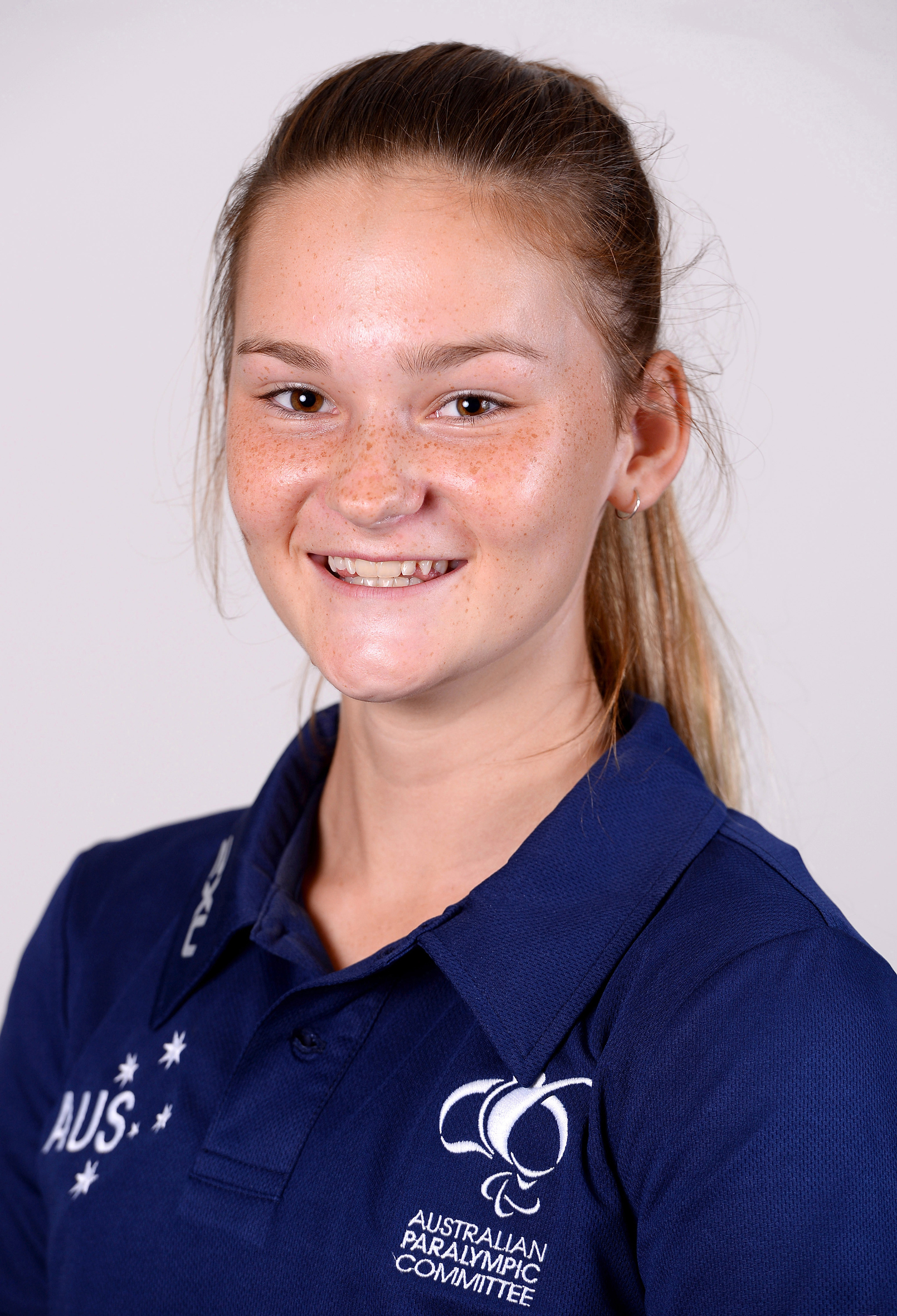
- 2016 Australian Paralympic team portrait

Personal information
- Born: 6 February 2000 (age 26) Tamworth, New South Wales
Medal record
Track and field T38
Representing Australia
Paralympic Games
Bronze medal – third place	2016 Rio de Janeiro	4×100 m relay T35-38
IPC World Championships
Silver medal – second place	2017 London	Long jump T38
Commonwealth Games
Silver medal – second place	2018 Gold Coast	Long jump T38

Erin Cleaver (born 6 February 2000) is an Australian Paralympic athlete with cerebral palsy. She represented Australia at the 2016 Rio Paralympics in athletics.

== Personal ==
Cleaver was born on 6 February 2000 in Tamworth, New South Wales. She was born with cerebral palsy right-sided hemiplegia, which affects the movement in her right arm and leg. Her family moved to Newcastle, New South Wales. She attended Hunter Sports High School.

== Athletics ==
Cleaver took up athletics while at primary school in Barraba, New South Wales. In 2010, she took up athletics with a disability and was classified as a T38 athlete. At the 2015 IPC Athletics World Championships in Doha, Cleaver competed in three events. She finished fifth in women's 100 metres T38, 4th in the women's long jump T38, and competed in the women's 4 x 100 metre relay (T35-38) where her team was disqualified for a baton change outside the takeover zone.

In 2015, she was awarded the Outstanding Individual Performance by an Academy athlete at the 2015 Hunter Academy of Sport Awards.

In the 2016 Rio Paralympics Cleaver competed in the T38 Long jump event where she placed 5th. She also competed in the T35-38 4 × 100 metre relay in a team with Brianna Coop, Jodi Jones-Elkington, Isis Holt, Torita Isaac and Ella Azura Pardy where they placed 3rd overall.

At the 2017 World Para Athletics Championships in London, she won the silver medal in the Long Jump T38 with a jump of 4.61m and finished 7th in the 100m T38.
