= Ana Cláudia Silva (athlete) =

Brazilian Paralympic athlete (born 1987)

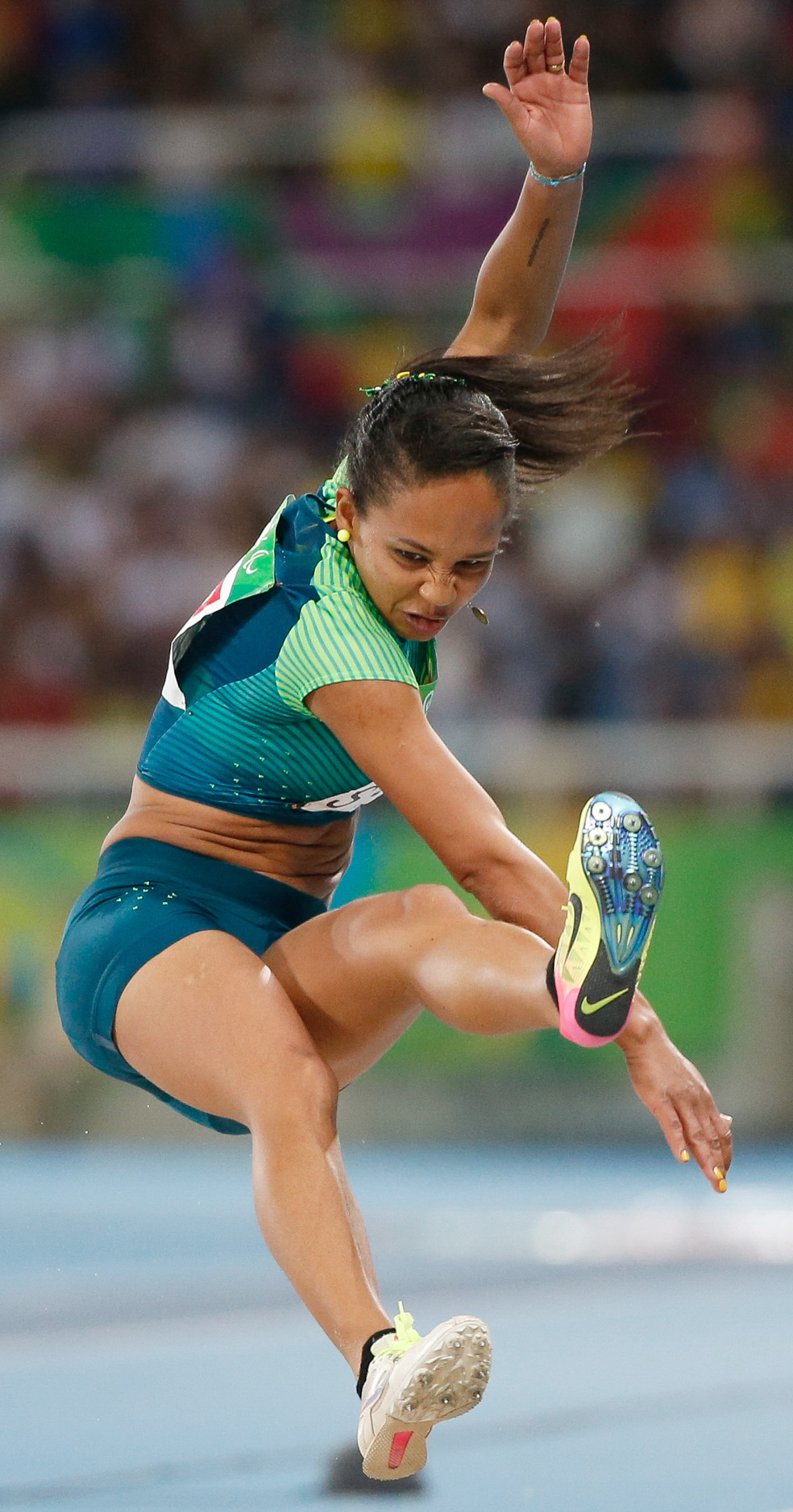
- Ana Cláudia Silva in final of T42 long jump at the Rio 2016 Paralympic Games

Personal information
- Full name: Ana Cláudia Maria da Silva
- Born: 23 December 1987 (age 38) Nazaré da Mata, Pernambuco, Brazil
- Home town: Recife, Pernambuco, Brazil

Sport
- Disability class: T42, T63
Medal record
Women's para athletics
Representing Brazil
Parapan American Games
Silver medal – second place	2023 Santiago	Long jump T42-44/61-64
World Championships
Bronze medal – third place	2015 Doha	100 m T42

Ana Cláudia Silva (born 23 December 1987), also known as Ana Cláudia Maria da Silva, is a Brazilian para athlete who has competed in the T42 and T63 classifications.

At the 2015 IPC Athletics World Championships in Doha, she earned a bronze medal in the Women's 100 m T42 event and finished 4th in the Women's long jump T42 event.

At the 2016 Paralympic Games in Rio, she finished 4th in the Women's 100 m T42 event and 5th in the Women's long jump T42 event.

At the 2020 Paralympic Games in Tokyo, she competed in the Women's 100 m T63 and Women's long jump T63 events.

At the 2023 Parapan American Games in Santiago, she earned a silver medal in the long jump event.

== Personal life ==
At the age of 6, she fell and fractured her femur, leaving her unable to walk. At the age of 12, she was able to walk again and began playing football. She later began participating in Paralympic athletics.
