= Lynda Hamri =

Algerian Paralympic athlete

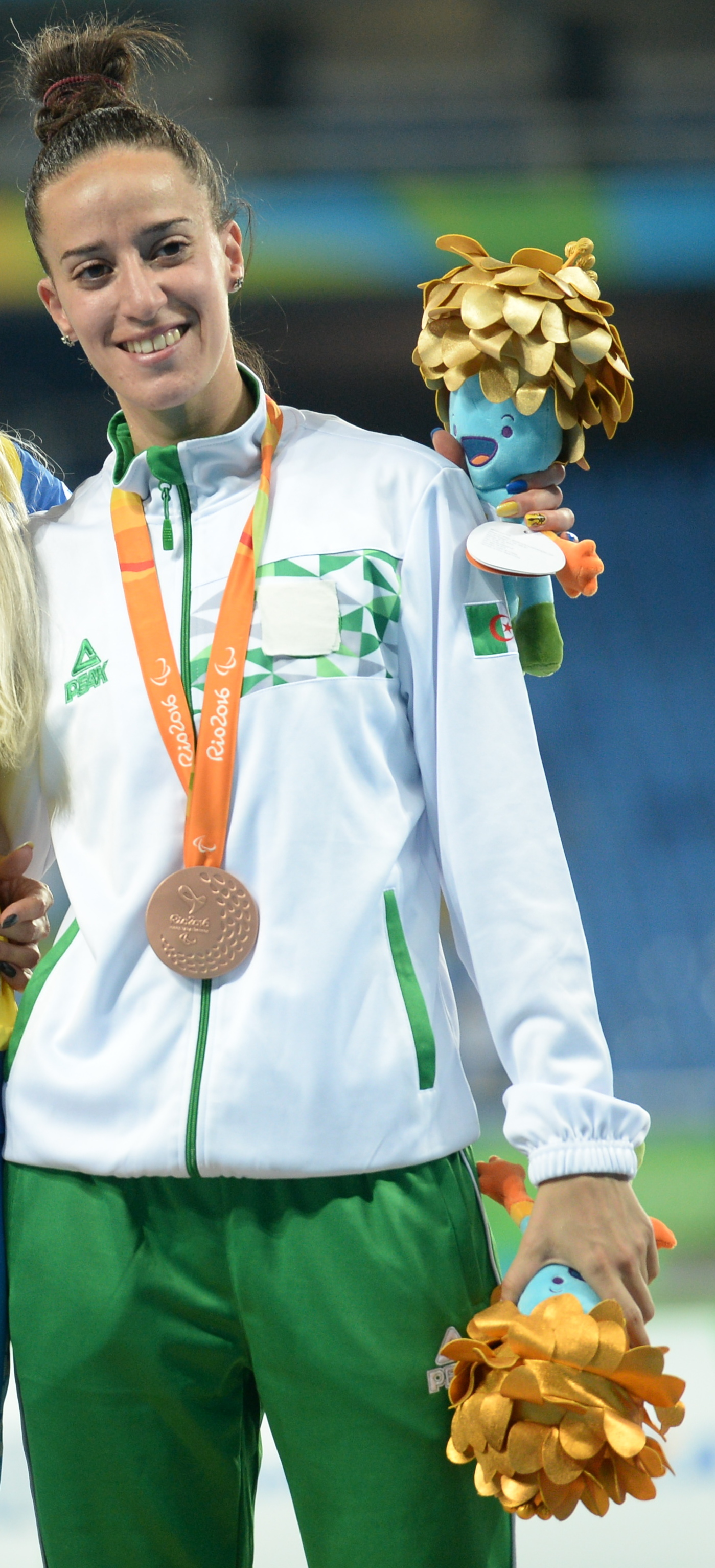

Personal information
- Nationality: Algerian
- Born: 8 February 1989 (age 37) Bab El-Oued, Algeria

Sport
- Country: Algeria
- Sport: Athletics
- Disability class: T12, F12
- Events: sprint, long jump
- Club: GSP Alger
- Coached by: Youcef Redouane
Medal record
Paralympic athletics
Representing Algeria
Paralympic Games
Silver medal – second place	2012 London	Long jump F13
Bronze medal – third place	2016 Rio de Janeiro	Long jump F12
Bronze medal – third place	2020 Tokyo	Long Jump T12
Bronze medal – third place	2024 Paris	Long jump T12
World Championships
Silver medal – second place	2013 Lyon	Long jump T12
Silver medal – second place	2015 Doha	Long jump T12
Bronze medal – third place	2017 London	Long jump T12
Bronze medal – third place	2025 New Delhi	Long jump T12
African Games
Bronze medal – third place	2007 Algiers	100 m - T13
Bronze medal – third place	2011 Maputo	100 m - T13

Lynda Hamri (born 8 February 1989) is a visually impaired Paralympian athlete from Algeria competing mainly in T12 classification sprint and long jump events. Hamri represented Algeria at two Summer Paralympics, winning a silver in the long jump at the 2012 Summer Paralympics in London and a bronze in the same event four years later in Rio de Janeiro. Hamri has also won two silver medals at the IPC World Championships, both in the long jump, at Lyon in 2013 and at Doha in 2015.

== Personal history ==
Hamri was born in Bab El-Oued, Algeria in 1989. She was born with a congenital eye condition, maculopathy, which is a deteriorating illness that effects her vision. Hamri comes from a large family of six sisters; one of which has the same eye condition.

== Sporting career ==
Hamri was described as a childhood tomboy by her mother, and enjoyed playing football with the other children in her neighbourhood. When the Tadjar family moved into their building, their daughter, who was an athletics coach, spotted in potential in Hamri. After her first training session Hamri fell for the sport, and spent the next few years moving through different clubs, but it was later noticed that her vision began to deteriorate and her illness was confirmed by a doctor.

Due to her failing eyesight, Hamri was classified as a T13 athlete and in 2007 she represented Algeria at her first major international competition, the 2007 All-Africa Games, where she won a bronze medal in the long jump. The high-point of her career came at the 2012 Summer Paralympics in London, where she qualified for both the 100 metre sprint (T13) and the long jump (F13). Despite posting a season's best in the sprint, Hamri was unable to progress through to the finals. Her efforts in the long jump paid greater dividends with a distance of 5.31m winning her the silver medal.

Further success followed over two successive IPC Athletics World Championships, 2013 in Lyon and 2015 in Doha where, now classified as a T12 athlete due to her condition worsening, she won two silver medals in the long jump event. At the 2016 Summer Paralympics in Rio de Janeiro, Hamri again entered the 100 metre sprint and the long jump. In the 100 metre heats, she qualified as a fastest losing athlete, but then failed to qualify through the semi-finals. Her success, as in London, came through the long jump, where she finished in bronze medal position, with a jump of 5.53 metres.
