= Taleah Williams =

American Paralympic athlete (born 1997)

Personal information
- Born: February 21, 1997 (age 29) Norfolk, Nebraska, U.S.
- Education: University of Nebraska Omaha; Doane University

Sport
- Sport: Para-athletics
- Disability class: T47
- Event: long jump
Medal record
Women's para-athletics
Representing the United States
World Championships
Gold medal – first place	2017 London	Long jump T47
Bronze medal – third place	2023 Paris	Long jump T47
Parapan American Games
Silver medal – second place	2019 Lima	Long Jump T47

Taleah Williams (born February 21, 1997) is an American Paralympic athlete specializing in long jump.

== Early life and education ==
Williams was born to Calvin and Priscilla Williams. She has five sisters, Amaya, LaShicka, LaShunda, LaTasha and Shernika, and two brothers, Calvin and Derrick. She was born without her lower left arm.

She attended Norfolk Senior High School in Norfolk, Nebraska, where she participates in track and field all four years. During the 2014–15 season, in her senior year, won the long jump event in both the conference and district meets, and finished in second place at the state class A championship. She also played basketball for three years, and helped lead the Panthers to a class A runner up finish at the state championship during her senior year. In 2023, she had her track jersey retired by the Norfolk Panthers.

On April 15, 2015, she signed her national letter of intent to participate in track in field at the University of Nebraska Omaha. She then transferred to Doane University.

== Career ==
Williams made her international debut for the United States at the 2016 Summer Paralympics in Rio de Janeiro, and finished in fifth place in the long jump T47 event. She then competed at the 2017 World Para Athletics Championships in London, and won a gold medal in the long jump T47 event.

In August 2019, she competed at the 2019 Parapan American Games in Lima, and won a silver medal in the long jump T47 event. In November 2019, she competed at the 2019 World Para Athletics Championships in Dubai, and finished in sixth place in the long jump T47 event.

She represented the United States at the 2020 Summer Paralympics in Tokyo, and finished in fourth place in the long jump T47 event with a jump of 5.39 meters.

In July 2023, she competed at the 2023 World Para Athletics Championships in Paris, and won a bronze medal in the long jump T47 event with a personal best jump of 5.65 meters.

In July 2024, during the U.S. Paralympic team trials, she qualified to represent the United States at the 2024 Summer Paralympics.

== Personal life ==
In addition to her Paralympic athletic career, Williams has a full-time job working at an eye doctor's office.
