= Athletics at the 2018 Commonwealth Games – Women's long jump (T38) =

Women's long jump (T38) at the 2018 Commonwealth Games
- Venue: Carrara Stadium
- Dates: 8 April
- Competitors: 7 from 5 nations
- Winning distance: 4.86 m GR

Medalists
gold medal	Olivia Breen	Wales
silver medal	Erin Cleaver	Australia
bronze medal	Taylor Doyle	Australia

The women's long jump (T38) at the 2018 Commonwealth Games, as part of the athletics programme, took place in the Carrara Stadium on 8 April 2018. The event was open to para-sport athletes competing under the T37 / T38 classifications.

== Records ==
Prior to this competition, the existing world and Games records were as follows:

World record	Wen Xiaoyan (CHN)	5.14 m (T37)	Rio de Janeiro, Brazil	14 September 2016
World record	Margarita Goncharova (RUS)	5.22 m (T38)	Berlin, Germany	20 June 2015
Games record	Jodi Elkington (AUS)	4.39 m	Glasgow, Scotland	27 July 2014

== Schedule ==
The schedule was as follows:

Date	Time	Round
Sunday 8 April 2018	15:18	Final

All times are Australian Eastern Standard Time (UTC+10)

== Results ==
With seven entrants, the event was held as a straight final.

=== Final ===
Rank	Athlete	Sport Class	#1	#2	#3	#4	#5	#6	Result	Notes
1st place, gold medalist(s)	Olivia Breen (WAL)	T38	x 0.0 m/s	x +1.1 m/s	4.56 -0.4 m/s	x +0.9 m/s	4.47 -0.2 m/s	4.86 +1.4 m/s	4.86	GR, PB
2nd place, silver medalist(s)	Erin Cleaver (AUS)	T38	4.23 +0.7 m/s	x +0.4 m/s	4.36 +0.8 m/s	4.34 -0.2 m/s	x +0.3 m/s	x +1.1 m/s	4.36	
3rd place, bronze medalist(s)	Taylor Doyle (AUS)	T38	x +0.9 m/s	4.21 -0.2 m/s	3.96 +0.3 m/s	4.21 +0.4 m/s	4.22 +0.9 m/s	x 0.0 m/s	4.22	
4	Juanelie Meijer (RSA)	T38	x +0.9 m/s	4.19 +0.3 m/s	4.18 -0.1 m/s	4.14 +0.3 m/s	x +0.6 m/s	3.85 -0.2 m/s	4.19	
5	Kailyn Joseph (AUS)	T37	x +0.5 m/s	4.06 +0.6 m/s	x -0.3 m/s	3.78 +0.1 m/s	3.96 +0.4 m/s	3.78 +1.0 m/s	4.06	
6	Molly Kingsbury (ENG)	T37	3.70 -0.1 m/s	3.57 -0.7 m/s	3.85 +0.4 m/s	3.46 -0.2 m/s	3.62 +0.2 m/s	3.71 +0.4 m/s	3.85	SB
7	Amy Carr (SCO)	T37	3.65 +1.2 m/s	3.33 +0.6 m/s	3.39 +0.4 m/s	3.52 +0.3 m/s	3.48 -0.1 m/s	3.49 +0.2 m/s	3.65	
