= Malu Perez Iser =

Cuban Paralympic athlete

Sport
- Country: Cuba
- Sport: Para-athletics
- Disability: Amputated left leg
- Disability class: T42
Medal record
Women's para-athletics
Representing Cuba
Paralympic Games
Bronze medal – third place	2016 Rio de Janeiro	Long jump T42

Malu Perez Iser is a Cuban Paralympic athlete. The documentary Yo soy Malú, which debuted at the Havana Film Festival, followed her life from her injury to her bronze medal run at the 2016 Summer Paralympics.
