= Natalia Jasińska =

Polish Paralympic athlete (born 1990)

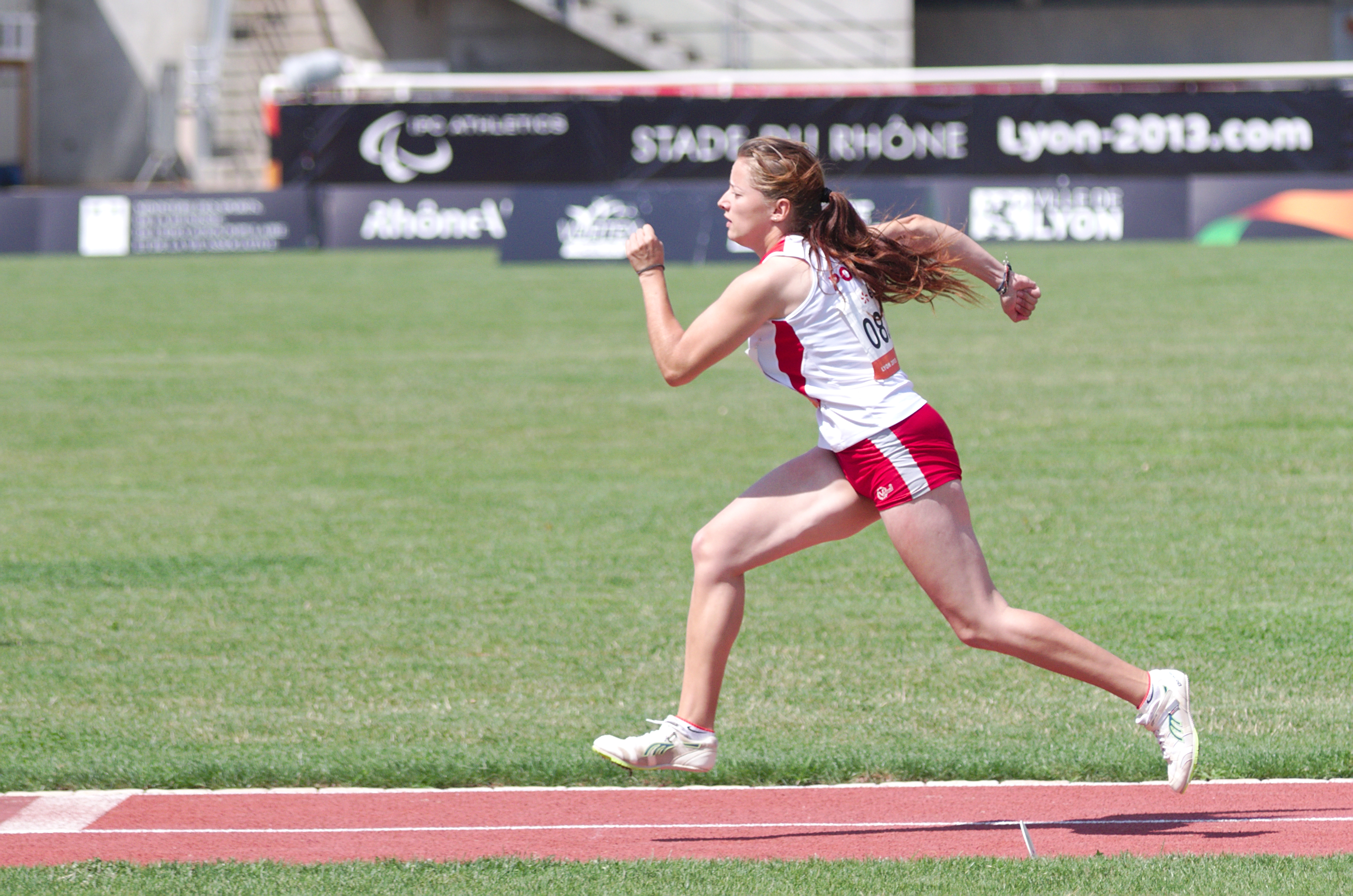

Personal information
- Born: 31 August 1990 (age 35) Grudziądz, Poland
- Height: 1.61 m (5 ft 3 in)

Sport
- Country: Poland
- Sport: Paralympic athletics
- Disability: Cerebral palsy
- Disability class: T37
- Event(s): 100 metres 200 metres 400 metres Long jump
- Club: CR Grudziadz
- Coached by: Grazyna Chochliuk
Medal record
Paralympic athletics
Representing Poland
European Championships
Bronze medal – third place	2016 Grosseto	Women's 200m T37
Bronze medal – third place	2018 Berlin	Women's long jump T37

Natalia Jasińska (born 31 August 1990) is a Polish Paralympic athlete who competes in sprinting and long jump events in international level events.

Her partner Mateusz Owczarek is also a Paralympic sprinter who competes internationally.
