= Martina Barber =

British Paralympic athlete

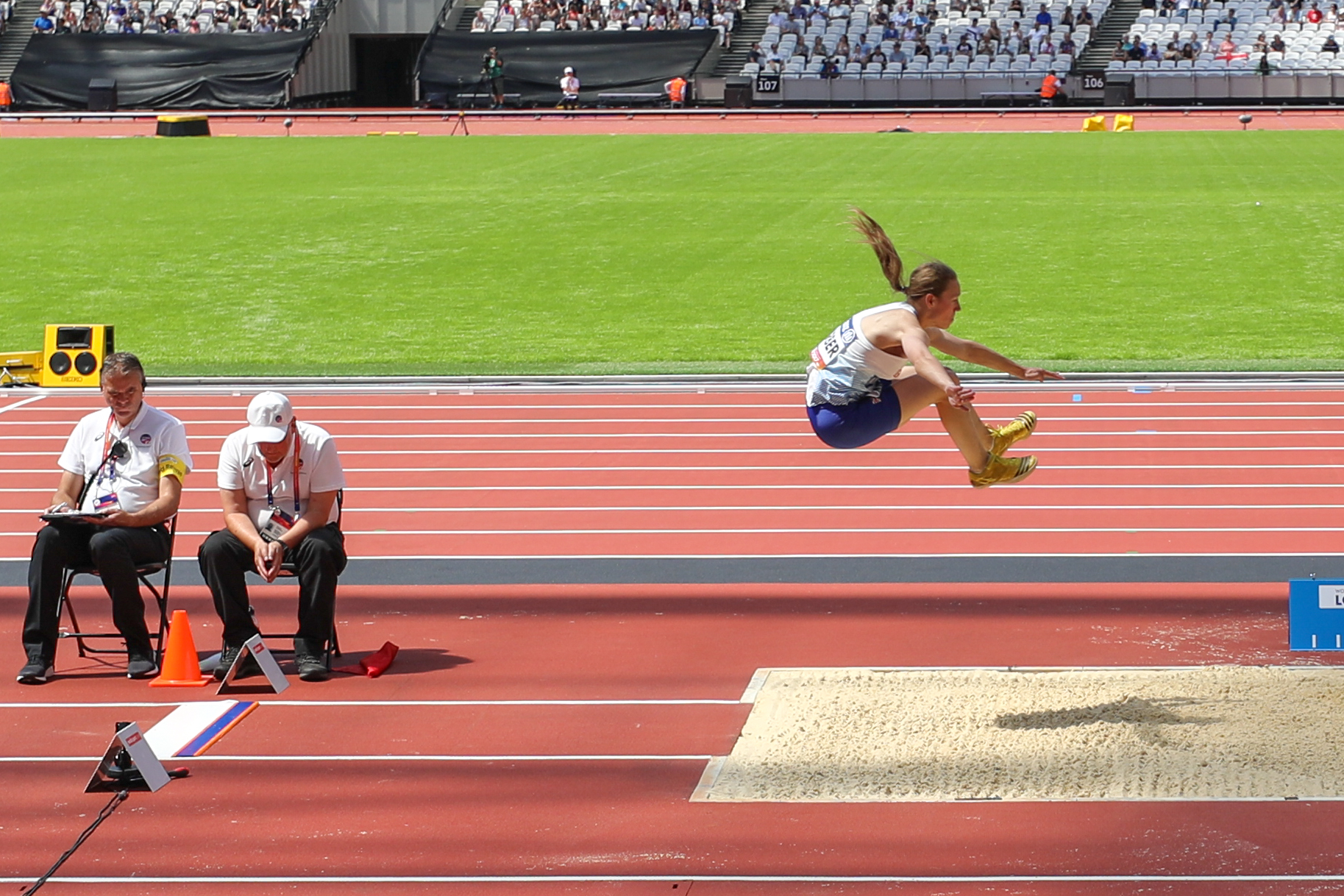
- in 2017

Personal information
- Nationality: British
- Born: 12 May 1995 (age 31) Hertfordshire

Sport
- Country: Great Britain
- Sport: Paralympic athletics
- Disability: intellectual
- Disability class: T20
- Event(s): Heptathlon; Long jump
- Club: Stevenage & North Herts Athletics Club
- Coached by: Paddy O'Shea
Medal record
Paralympic athletics
Representing Great Britain
INAS World Athletics Championships
Gold medal – first place	2013 Prague	Women's heptathlon
INAS European Open Championships
Gold medal – first place	2012 Gävle	Women's heptathlon
Gold medal – first place	2014 Bergen op Zoom	Women's heptathlon
Silver medal – second place	2012 Gävle	Women's 100m hurdles

Martina Barber (born 12 May 1995) is a British Paralympic athlete who competes in mainly long jump events at international level events. She has won two gold medals for Great Britain at the INAS World Athletics Championships and European Championships in heptathlon.
