= Stefanie Reid =

British Paralympic athlete

Stefanie Reid MBE
Personal information
- Full name: Stefanie McLeod Reid
- Born: 26 October 1984 (age 41) New Zealand
- Website: StefReid.com

Sport
- Sport: Track and field
- Disability class: T44
Medal record
Women's para athletics
Representing Canada
Paralympic Games
Bronze medal – third place	2008 Beijing	200m T44
Parapan American Games
Silver medal – second place	2007 Rio de Janeiro	Long jump F42/44
Bronze medal – third place	2007 Rio de Janeiro	200m T46
Paralympic World Cup
Bronze medal – third place	2008 Manchester	200m T44
Representing Great Britain
Paralympic Games
Silver medal – second place	2012 London	Long jump F44
Silver medal – second place	2016 Rio	Long jump F44
IPC World Championships
Gold medal – first place	2017 London	Long jump T44
Bronze medal – third place	2011 Christchurch	Long jump F44
Bronze medal – third place	2011 Christchurch	200 m T44
IPC European Championships
Gold medal – first place	2014 Swansea	Long jump T44
Paralympic World Cup
Silver medal – second place	2012 Manchester	200 m T44
Bronze medal – third place	2010 Manchester	200 m T44
Bronze medal – third place	2012 Manchester	100 m T44
Disability Athletics Challenge
Gold medal – first place	2010 London	Long jump F44
Grand Prix
Bronze medal – third place	2010 London	100m T44

Stefanie McLeod Reid MBE (born 26 October 1984) is a track and field paralympian who competes for Canada and Great Britain, competing mainly in category T44 long jump and sprint events. A multiple medal winner at European and world level, she won a bronze medal in the 200m at the 2008 Summer Paralympics and silver in the long jump at the 2012 Summer Paralympics.

== Personal life ==
Reid was born in New Zealand to British parents; her father is Scottish and her mother is English. The family moved to Toronto, Canada when she was aged 4. Reid lost her right foot in a boating accident, aged 16. Her life was saved by a surgeon in Toronto who amputated her right leg below the knee.

Reid is married to Canadian wheelchair racer Brent Lakatos, and they now live in England where they both train at Loughborough University. Reid is a Christian.

In 2024, Reid campaigned for Nike to allow customers to buy single shoes, rather than pairs, if they were disabled, stating that the company used amputee mannequins in its stores without offering an option to only purchase individual trainers. In response, Nike said it was "exploring opportunities."

== Athletics career ==
Sports-loving before the accident, she played rugby union, but encountered difficulties after her amputation with referees who felt the artificial leg could injure other players. Deciding to concentrate on her studies, she gained a full scholarship to Queen's University to study biochemistry. After joining the campus track and field team, three years later she competed at the World Championships.

Competing for Canada in the 2008 Summer Paralympics in Beijing, China, she won a bronze medal in the women's 200 metres - T44 event, went out in the first round of the women's 100 metres - T44 event and finished fifth in the women's Long jump - F44 event. She switched allegiance to Great Britain at the start of 2010.

In April 2013, it was announced that Reid would feature in the latest campaign for British high-street store Debenhams, the first high street chain to use disabled models in its campaigns. Reid's photo was featured in British Vogue magazine in April 2013. The imagery celebrates diversity in the retail sector.

Reid attempted to qualify to represent Scotland in the main long jump competition at the 2014 Commonwealth Games. She did not meet the qualifying standard of 6.2 metres, although she set a world record for the T44 class at the Sainsbury's Glasgow Grand Prix (5.47m) whilst attempting to qualify.

She was appointed Member of the Order of the British Empire (MBE) in the 2018 New Year Honours for services to Paralympic sport.

== Television career ==
Since retiring as a full time athlete in June 2022, Reid began to carve out a career as a reporter, guest and presenter across a range of media outlets.

Reid was a semi-finalist on Celebrity MasterChef in 2018 and was a quarter-finalist on the fourteenth series of Dancing on Ice.

In 2020, Reid was a commentator for the Tokyo 2020 Paralympic Games.

In 2023, Reid was part of the Canadian Broadcasting Corporation's sports coverage team of the Santiago 2023 Pan American Games in Chile.

In 2025, Reid was part of the BBC's coverage of the 2025 World Athletics Championships in Tokyo, commentating on field events. She also trekked Austria and Switzerland in Pilgrimage (TV series).

In 2026, Reid returned to the CBC as a host for its coverage of the 2026 Winter Paralympics.

She won the Canadian Screen Award for Best Sports Host at the 14th Canadian Screen Awards in 2026 for her coverage of the 2024 Summer Paralympics.
