= Taylor Doyle =

Australian Paralympic athlete

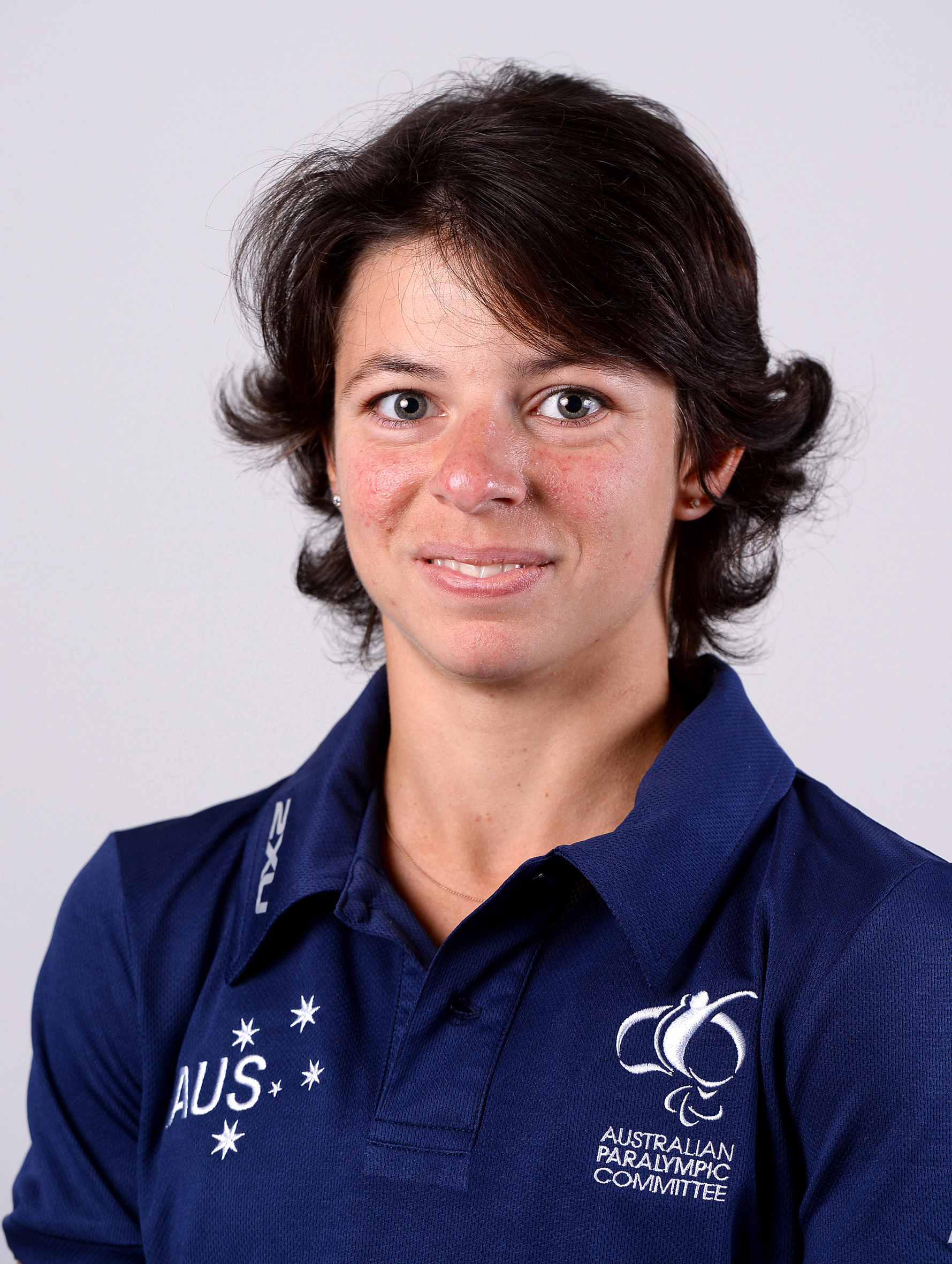
- 2016 Australian Paralympic team portrait

Personal information
- Born: 19 December 1992 (age 33) Sydney, New South Wales

Sport
- Disability class: T38
Medal record
Women's para athletics
Representing Australia
Paralympic Games
Silver medal – second place	2016 Rio	Long Jump - T38
Commonwealth Games
Bronze medal – third place	2018 Gold Coast	Long jump - T38

Taylor Doyle (born 19 December 1992) is an Australian Paralympic athlete with an intellectual and physical disability. She was selected to represent Australia at the 2016 Rio Paralympics in athletics.

== Personal ==
Doyle was born on 19 December 1992 in Sydney, New South Wales. At 8 months old, she was diagnosed with tuberous sclerosis which causes epilepsy and daily seizures.

In 2014 she had epilepsy surgery to reduce the seizures. The surgery was successful, she has had no seizures since 14 April 2014.

However the surgery left her with right side weakness. Through physio and training she is able to compete competitively, in the T38 classification, in Para Athletics.

== Athletics ==
Doyle took up little athletics at the age of nine. Doyle has competed at national and international Special Olympics events. She is classified as a T38 athlete. At the 2013 IPC Athletics World Championships, she finished 9th in the Women's Long Jump F20 prior to epilepsy surgery. At the 2015 IPC Athletics World Championships, she competed in two events and finished 9th in the Women's Long Jump T38 and 7th in the Women's 100m T38. Her time of 14.29 in the 100m was a personal best.

At the 2016 Rio Paralympics, she won a silver medal in the Women's Long Jump T38 with an Australian record jump of 4.62m.

She is a member of the Girraween Athletics Club.

Taylor is coached by Greg Smith, and also trains at NSWIS. She announced her retirement through Twitter in July 2020.
