= Sara Martínez =

Spanish Paralympic athlete (born 1990)

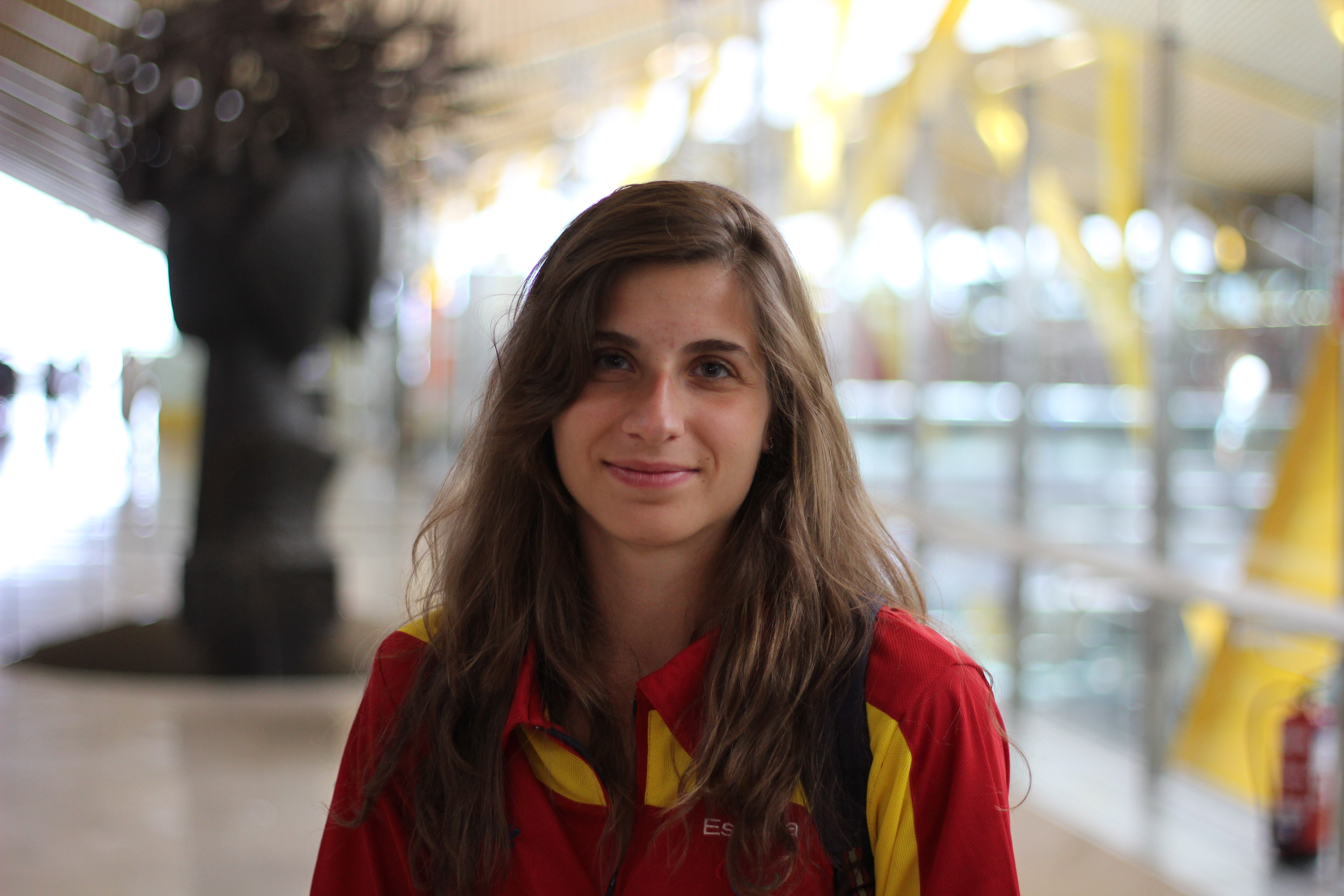

Personal information
- Full name: Sara Martínez Puntero
- Nationality: Spanish
- Born: 26 February 1990 (age 36) Madrid, Spain

Sport
- Country: Spain
- Sport: Track and field (F12)
Medal record
Paralympic Games
Silver medal – second place	2020 Tokyo	Long Jump T12
Silver medal – second place	2024 Paris	Long jump T12
World Championships
Silver medal – second place	2017 London	Long jump T12
Silver medal – second place	2024 Kobe	Long jump T12
Bronze medal – third place	2013 Lyon	Long jump T12
Bronze medal – third place	2015 Doha	Long jump T12
Bronze medal – third place	2015 Doha	100 m relay T11–13
IPC European Championships
Gold medal – first place	2014 Swansea	Long jump T12
Gold medal – first place	2016 Grosseto	Long jump T12

Sara Martínez Puntero (born 26 February 1990 in Madrid, Spain) is a Paralympic athlete from Spain competing mainly in category F12 track and field events.

== Personal ==
Martínez was born on 26 February 1990 in Madrid, Spain, and has partial vision. In 2012, she lived in Madrid.

== Athletics ==
Martínez mainly competed in category F12 track and field events, and represents Madrid in Spanish national competitions.

Martínez competed in the 2009 Spanish National Athletics Championship where she finished first in the women's visually impaired long jump. At the 2011 Basauri Meeting track and field event, she finished first in the long jump with a distance of 5.40 meters. The 2011 Spanish National Adaptive Athletics Championships were held in Valencia and she competed in them. She competed at the 2011 IPC World Athletics Championships in Christchurch, New Zealand where she finished fourth in the long jump and seventh in the 100 meters. In 2012, she was a recipient of a Plan ADOP €6,000 athlete scholarship and a €2,500 coaching scholarship. Prior to the start of the London Games, she trained with several other visually impaired Spanish track and field athletes in Logroño. In the lead up to the London Paralympics, in July 2012, she competed in a Diamond League race at the Crystal Palace National Sports Centre in London. In March 2013 at the Spanish Athletics Paralympic Championship, she qualified for the 2013 IPC Athletics World Championships in the 100 meter event. She competed at the Basauriko Probak 2013, a qualifying event for a number of other Spanish competitor for the IPC World Championships. In May 2013, she competed in the Spanish national championships, where she earned a gold medal in the long jump. In July 2013, she participated in the 2013 IPC Athletics World Championships.

=== Paralympics ===
Martínez competed in the 2004 Summer Paralympics, 2008 Summer Paralympics and 2012 Summer Paralympics in the 100 meter and long jump events. In London, she did qualify for the finals of the 100 meter race following her performance in the semi-finals.
