= Piroska Csontos =

Hungarian Paralympic athlete

Personal information
- Nickname: Piró
- Born: 11 February 1994 (age 32) Kiskunfélegyháza, Hungary
- Height: 1.60 m (5 ft 3 in)

Sport
- Country: Hungary
- Sport: Paralympic athletics
- Disability: Intellectual impairment
- Disability class: T20
- Event(s): 100 metres 200 metres 400 metres Long jump
- Club: KARC Club, Kecskemét
- Coached by: Victor Nagy
Medal record
Paralympic athletics
Representing Hungary
INAS Global Games
Silver medal – second place	2015 Guayaquil	Women's 100m
Silver medal – second place	2015 Guayaquil	Women's 4x100m relay
Bronze medal – third place	2015 Guayaquil	Women's 4x400m relay
European Championships
Bronze medal – third place	2016 Grosseto	Women's 400m T20
INAS Open European Athletics Championships
Gold medal – first place	2014 Bergen op Zoom	Women's 100m
Gold medal – first place	2014 Bergen op Zoom	Women's 200m
Gold medal – first place	2017 Praha	Women's 4x400m relay
Silver medal – second place	2014 Bergen op Zoom	Women's 4x100m relay
Silver medal – second place	2014 Bergen op Zoom	Women's 4x400m relay
Silver medal – second place	2017 Praha	Women's 200m

Piroska Csontos (born 11 February 1994) is a Hungarian Paralympic athlete who competes in sprinting and long jump events in international level events.
