= Ana Filipe =

Portuguese Paralympic athlete (born 1999)

Personal information
- Born: 28 August 1999 (age 26) Terceira Island, Portugal

Sport
- Sport: Paralympic athletics
- Event(s): Triple jump Long jump High jump 60 metre hurdles 100 metre hurdles
Medal record
Representing Portugal
World Championships
Bronze medal – third place	2015 Doha	Triple jump T20
Bronze medal – third place	2019 London	Long jump T20
INAS World Outdoor Championships
Gold medal – first place	2021 Bydgoszcz	100m hurdles
Gold medal – first place	2021 Bydgoszcz	High jump
Silver medal – second place	2021 Bydgoszcz	Long jump
Silver medal – second place	2021 Bydgoszcz	Triple jump
INAS World Indoor Championships
Gold medal – first place	2016 Ancona	High jump
Gold medal – first place	2018 Val de Reuil	High jump II1
Gold medal – first place	2024 Reims	60m hurdles II1
Gold medal – first place	2024 Reims	Long jump II1
Gold medal – first place	2024 Reims	Triple jump II1
Silver medal – second place	2015 St. Petersburg	60m hurdles
Silver medal – second place	2024 Reims	High jump II1
Bronze medal – third place	2016 Ancona	Long jump
Bronze medal – third place	2018 Val de Reuil	Long jump II1
INAS European Championships
Gold medal – first place	2018 Paris	High jump II1
Gold medal – first place	2022 Krakow	High jump II1
Silver medal – second place	2018 Paris	100 hurdles II1
Silver medal – second place	2018 Paris	Triple jump II1
Silver medal – second place	2022 Krakow	Long jump II1
Silver medal – second place	2024 Uppsala	Triple jump II1

Ana Margarida Filipe (born 28 August 1999) is a Portuguese Paralympic athlete who competes in international track and field competitions. She is a two-time World bronze medalist and has competed at the 2016, 2020 and 2024 Summer Paralympics.

Filipe has also competed at the INAS World Athletics Championships and national able-bodied competitions.
