= Érica Gomes =

Portuguese Paralympic athlete

Personal information
- Nickname: Ery
- Born: 9 May 1994 (age 32) Coimbra, Portugal
- Height: 1.65 m (5 ft 5 in)
- Weight: 60 kg (132 lb)

Sport
- Country: Portugal
- Sport: Paralympic athletics
- Disability class: T20
- Event(s): High jump Long jump Triple jump
- Club: Sporting Clube de Portugal
- Coached by: Mario Anibal
Medal record
Paralympic athletics
Representing Portugal
World Para Athletics Championships
Silver medal – second place	2015 Doha	Women's long jump T20
Silver medal – second place	2017 London	Women's long jump T20
World Para Athletics European Championships
Silver medal – second place	2018 Berlin	Women's long jump T20
INAS World Athletics Championships
Bronze medal – third place	2013 Prague	Women's long jump
INAS European Open Athletics Championships
Gold medal – first place	2014 Bergen op Zoom	Women's high jump
Silver medal – second place	2014 Bergen op Zoom	Women's long jump
Silver medal – second place	2014 Bergen op Zoom	Women's triple jump

Érica Gomes (born 9 May 1994) is a Portuguese Paralympic athlete who competes in high jump, long jump and triple jump at international level events.

== Personal life ==
Born in Portugal, Gomes is of Cape Verdean descent.
