= Fatma Damla Altın =

Turkish Paralympic athlete (born 2002)

Personal information
- Nationality: Turkish
- Born: 18 January 2002 (age 24) Kırklareli, Turkey

Sport
- Country: Turkey
- Sport: Para-athletics
- Disability class: T20
- Events: Long jump, pentathlon, heptathlon
- Club: Samsun ÖY GSK
- Coached by: Aytunç Göz
Medal record
Women's para-athletics
Representing Turkey
Paralympic Games
| Bronze medal – third place | 2024 Paris | Long jump T20 |
Global Games
| Silver medal – second place | 2023 Vichy | heptathlon |
| Bronze medal – third place | 2023 Vichy | 400 m hurdles |
| Silver medal – second place | 2023 Vichy | high jump |
World Championships
| Silver medal – second place | 2025 New Delhi | Long jump T20 |
| Bronze medal – third place | 2024 Kobe | Long jump T20 |
| Bronze medal – third place | 2021 Bydgoszcz | 100 m hurdles |
| Gold medal – first place | 2021 Bydgoszcz | 400 m hurdles |
| Gold medal – first place | 2021 Bydgoszcz | heptathlon |
| Silver medal – second place | 2021 Bydgoszcz | 4x100 m relay |
| Gold medal – first place | 2021 Bydgoszcz | 4x400 m relay |
World Grand Prix
| Gold medal – first place | 2024 Dubai | long junp |
World Indoor Championships
| Gold medal – first place | 2020 Toruń | pentathlon |
Open European Championships
| Gold medal – first place | 2024 Uppsala | 4x100 m |
| Gold medal – first place | 2024 Uppsala | 4x400 m |
| Gold medal – first place | 2024 Uppsala | heptathlon |
| Silver medal – second place | 2024 Uppsala | high jump |
| Silver medal – second place | 2024 Uppsala | long jump |
Open European Indoor Championships
| Gold medal – first place | 2021 Nantes | pentathlon |
| Gold medal – first place | 2019 Istanbul | pentathlon |
World Junior Championships
| Silver medal – second place | 2019 Nottwil | U20 long jump |

Fatma Damla Altın (born 18 January 2002) is a Turkish Paralympian athlete. She competes in the T20 disability class of long jump, pentathlon and heptathlon events. She has won many world and European champion titles in different para-athletics disciplines.

== Sport career ==
Altın started performing athletics with the encouragement of her physical education teacher. In 2018, her family moved to Samsun, and she went under the coaching of Aytunç Göz. She was admitted to the national team following her success at the Turkish Intellectual Impairment Sport Athletics Championships in 2019.

She competes in the intellectual impairment class T20 of long jump, pentathlon and heptathlon events. She is a member of Samsun ÖY GSK, where she is coached by Aytunç Göz.

=== 2019 ===
Altın debuted internationally at the World Para Athletics Junior Championships in 2019, and won the silver medal in the long jump T20 of U20 division with 5.02 m.

The same year, she claimed the gold medal in the pentathlon event at the 9th INAS Open European Indoor Athletics Championships in Istanbul, Turkey.

=== 2020 ===
She captured the gold medal in the pentathlon event at the 2020 INAS World Indoor Athletics Championships in Toruń, Poland.

=== 2021 ===
At the 2021 Virtus European Indoor Athletics Championships in Nantes, France, she won the gold medal in the pentathlon event.

She took the bronze medal in the 100 m hurdles with 19.58, the gold medal in the 400 m hurdles with 1:19.86, second place in the high jump with 1.35 m, fourth place in the long jump with 5.31 m, the gold medal in the heptathlon with 2,147 points, the silver medal in the 4x100 m with 54.04, and the gold medal in the 4x400 m event with 4:26.98 at the 2021 Virtus World Athletics Championships in Bydgoszcz, Poland.

She competed at the 2020 Summer Paralympics in Tokyo, Japan, and finished the long jump event with 5.06 m on the seventh place.

=== 2023 ===
She won the silver medal in the heptathlon event with 3,251 points, the bronze medal in the 400 m hurdles with 80.97, and the silver medal in high jump with 1.60 m at the 2023 Virtus Global Games in Vichy, France.

=== 2024 ===
Altın claimed the gold medal in the long jump event with 5.63 m at the 2024 World Para Athletics Grand Prix in Dubai, United Arab Emirates.

She won the bronze medal with her 5.43 m mark in the long jump at the 2024 World Para Athletics Championships in Kobe, Japan.

At the 2024 Virtus Open European Athletics Championships in Uppsala, Sweden, she captured gold medals in the 4x100 m relay with 49.92 and 4x400 m with 4:09.91 and heptathlon with 1,882 points as well as silver medals in the high jump with 1.54 m, and long jump with 5.50 m.

Altın received a quota for participation at the 2024 Summer Paralympics in Paris, France. She won the bronze medal in the long jump T20 event with her career best mark of 5.73 m.

== Personal life ==
Altın was born in Kırklareli, northwestern Turkey on 18 January 2002. Since 2018, she has been living in Samsun.
