= Ronja Oja =

Finnish Paralympic athlete (born 1992)

Personal information
- Born: 31 July 1992 (age 33) Espoo, Finland
- Home town: Tuusula, Finland

Sport
- Country: Finland
- Sport: Paralympic athletics
- Disability: Congenital vitroretinopathy
- Disability class: T11
- Event(s): 100 metres 200 metres Long jump
- Club: Helsingin Kisa-Veikot
- Coached by: Joha Flinck; Matti Laatikainen
Medal record
Paralympic athletics
Representing Finland
European Championships
Gold medal – first place	2018 Berlin	Women's 100m T11
Silver medal – second place	2016 Grosseto	Women's long jump T11
Bronze medal – third place	2014 Swansea	Women's 200m T11
Bronze medal – third place	2016 Grosseto	Women's 100m T11
Bronze medal – third place	2018 Berlin	Women's long jump T11

Ronja Oja (born 31 July 1992) is a blind Finnish Paralympic athlete who competes in sprinting and long jump events in international level events. Her brother Jesper Oja is her running guide in track events.
