= Angelina Lanza =

French Paralympic athlete

Angélina Lanza
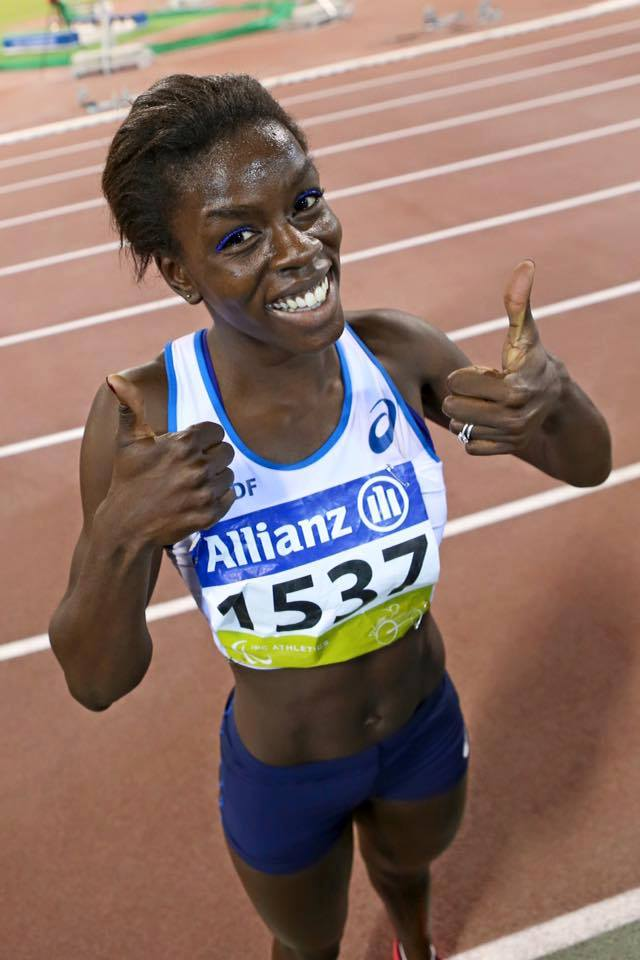

Personal information
- Born: 6 June 1993 (age 33) Lomé, Togo

Sport
- Country: France
- Sport: Paralympic athletics
- Disability: Polio
- Disability class: T46
- Club: Lyon Athlétisme
- Coached by: Thomas Verro
Medal record
Women's para athletics
Representing France
World Championships
Bronze medal – third place	2015 Doha	Long jump T47
European Championships
Gold medal – first place	2018 Berlin	200 m T47
Gold medal – first place	2018 Berlin	400 m T47
Gold medal – first place	2018 Berlin	Long jump T47
Silver medal – second place	2018 Berlin	Universal relay
Bronze medal – third place	2016 Grosseto	100 m T47
Bronze medal – third place	2016 Grosseto	200 m T47
Bronze medal – third place	2016 Grosseto	Long jump T47

Angélina Lanza (born 6 June 1993) is a French Paralympic athlete who competes in both track and field events.
