= Scout Bassett =

American Paralympic athlete

Personal information
- Nationality: American
- Born: Zhu Fuzhi; 18 August 1988 (age 37) Nanjing, China
- Height: 4 ft 9 in (145 cm)
- Weight: 86 lb (39 kg)

Sport
- Country: United States
- Sport: Paralympic Track & Field
- Disability class: T42 / F42
- Coached by: Tonie Campbell
Medal record
Women's para-athletics
Representing United States
World Championships
Bronze medal – third place	2017 London	100 m T42
Bronze medal – third place	2017 London	Long Jump T42
Parapan American Games
Gold medal – first place	2019 Lima	Long Jump T42
Women's paratriathlon
World Championships
Gold medal – first place	2008 Vancouver	AWAD PC2
Silver medal – second place	2010 Budapest	TRI 2
Bronze medal – third place	2011 Beijing	TRI 2

Scout Bassett (born Zhu Fuzhi; August 18, 1988) is an American Paralympic track and field athlete.

== Early life ==
Bassett spent her first seven years of life in a government-run orphanage in Nanjing, China after she was found abandoned on the side of a street following the loss of her right leg in a chemical fire as a newborn baby. As a child, she made a makeshift prosthetic leg using leather belts and masking tape and began to walk at age six, but never went outside of the orphanage in which she was being raised. Bassett was adopted in 1995 by an American couple from Michigan.

After being adopted just shy of her eighth birthday, Bassett grew up in Harbor Springs, Michigan. On growing up in Harbor Springs, Bassett recalls "They were so unaccepting of me," she says. "The girls were so noninclusive and mean, and being the only Asian in an all-white school was not fun." Scout buried herself in books, plowing through as many political biographies as her brain could digest, and sports, which felt like the easiest and most direct route to assimilation.

After completing high school, Bassett attended UCLA on a full scholarship. She graduated in 2011 with degrees in Sociology and Anthropology.

== Paralympic career ==
Bassett began playing soccer, aged ten before starting her athletic career by participating in the Challenged Athletes Foundation, aged 14, who granted her a prosthetic running leg, then attended the Chula Vista Elite Athlete Training Center in California at the age of 18. She first started to compete in triathlons and won three silver medals and one bronze medal in the ITU Paratriathlon World Championships, in the 2011 ITU Paratriathlon World Championships, she went to China for the first time since she was adopted.

Bassett transitioned to track and field before the paratriathlon event was introduced in the 2016 Summer Paralympics. She did an entire first full season of athletic training attempting to qualify for the 2012 Summer Paralympics in London, when she got the opportunity to try and compete in the US Paralympic team. Bassett came last in the 100m at the US Championships, which was a qualifier for the Paralympic Games, as she failed to make the team and almost decided to quit track and field.

In 2015, Bassett still wanted to be a Paralympian and moved to San Diego so that she could do full-time training and she started breaking national records in the T42 classification. She then went on to qualify and compete in the 2016 Summer Paralympic but ended up being fifth in the 100m and tenth in the long jump. In 2017, Bassett successfully attended the 2017 World Para Athletics Championships in London, United Kingdom, where she won her first international medals in the 100m and long jump. She is currently the world record holder in the 400m T42 and American holder in 100m and 200m.

In 2019, Bassett took home the gold medal in the Women's Long Jump T42-44/T61-63 at the Parapan American Games in Lima, Peru.

Bassett was one of 17 athletes featured in eleventh edition of ESPN The Magazine's Body Issue
