= Kaede Maegawa =

Japanese Paralympic sprinter (born 1998)

Personal information
- Born: 24 February 1998 (age 28) Tsu, Mie, Japan

Sport
- Sport: Para athletics
Medal record
Men's para athletics
Representing Japan
World Championships
Silver medal – second place	2017 London	Long jump T42
Bronze medal – third place	2024 Kobe	Long jump T63
Bronze medal – third place	2024 Kobe	100m T63
Asian Para Games
Silver medal – second place	2026 Aichi–Nagoya	Long jump T63

Kaede Maegawa (born 24 February 1998) is a Japanese Paralympic sprinter and long jumper who competes in international track and field competitions. She competed at the 2016, 2020 and 2024 Summer Paralympics.

== Personal life ==
In 2021, Maegawa published a children's book about a black Labrador dog who has a prosthetic leg, she depicted the dog like herself who has a disability and her family's pet dog, Ku, who is also a black Labrador. The book was written and illustrated by Maegawa while she was competing at the 2020 Summer Paralympics.
