= Livia De Clercq =

Belgian Paralympic athlete

Personal information
- Born: 3 June 1982 (age 43) Ghent, Belgium
- Home town: Deinze, Belgium
- Height: 1.68 m (5 ft 6 in)

Sport
- Country: Belgium
- Sport: Paralympic athletics
- Disability class: T63
- Event(s): Long jump 100 metres
- Club: AC Deinze

Livia De Clercq (born 3 June 1982) is a Belgian Paralympic athlete who competes in long jump and occasionally sprinting events at international level events.

De Clercq had her left leg amputated above the knee after she was diagnosed with a tumour in left knee aged fourteen. She had her kneecap removed but her body rejected the prosthesis which led to amputation.
