= Polly Maton =

British para-sprinter and long jumper

Personal information
- Nationality: British
- Born: 23 October 1999 (age 27) London, England

Sport
- Country: United Kingdom
- Sport: Paralympic athletics
- Disability class: T47
- Club: Moonrakers AC
- Coached by: Colin Baross
Medal record
Paralympic athletics
Representing United Kingdom
World Championships
Silver medal – second place	2017 London	Long jump T47
European Championships
Bronze medal – third place	2018 Berlin	Long jump T47
Bronze medal – third place	2018 Berlin	100m T47

Polly Maton (born 23 October 1999) is a British para sprinter and long jumper. Maton was born without her right arm, runs with a prosthetic arm and competes in the T47 category. She won her first gold medals at the IWAS Junior Championships at the age of 14.

== Education ==
Maton attended Urchfont C of E Primary School and went on to complete her GCSEs and A Levels at Dauntsey's School. She is currently reading History and Politics at the University of Oxford.
