= INAS World Athletics Championships =

International para-athletics competition

INAS World Athletics Championships are a biennial international athletics competition hosted by the International Sports Federation for Persons with Intellectual Disability for athletes who have an intellectual impairment and compete in the T20 and F20 classes.

== Athletic events contested ==
=== Outdoor events ===
Key

- M - men's events only contested
- F - women's events only contested
- X - both events contested
- — - not contested in that year

Event	1989	1999	2001	2003	2005	2007	2009	2013	2017
100 metres	X	X	X	X	X	X	X	X	X
200 metres	X	X	X	X	X	X	X	X	X
400 metres	X	X	X	X	X	X	X	X	X
800 metres	X	X	X	X	X	X	X	X	X
1500 metres	X	X	X	X	X	X	X	X	X
3000 metres	M	F	F	F	F	F	F	F	F
5000 metres	—	X	X	X	X	X	X	X	X
10000 metres	—	X	X	M	M	M	M	M	M
100 metre hurdles	F	F	F	F	F	F	F	F	F
110 metre hurdles	M	M	M	M	M	M	M	M	M
400 metre hurdles	—	—	—	X	X	X	X	X	X
3000 metre steeplechase	—	—	—	—	—	M	M	M	M
4 × 100 metre relay	X	X	X	X	X	X	X	X	X
4 × 400 metre relay	X	X	X	X	X	X	X	X	X
3km race walk	F	F	—	—	—	—	—	—	—
5km race walk	M	M	F	F	F	F	F	F	F
10km race walk	—	—	M	M	M	M	M	M	M
High jump	X	X	X	X	X	X	X	X	X
Long jump	X	X	X	X	X	X	X	X	X
Triple jump	—	X	X	X	X	X	X	X	X
Shot put	X	X	X	X	X	X	X	X	X
Discus throw	X	X	X	X	X	X	X	X	X
Javelin throw	X	X	X	X	X	X	X	X	X
Hammer throw	—	—	—	X	—	X	X	X	X
Pole vault	—	—	—	—	—	—	—	M	—
Heptathlon	—	—	—	—	—	M	M	X	X
Pentathlon	—	—	X	X	X	X	X	X	X

=== Indoor events ===
Event	2001	2003	2004	2006	2008	2010	2012	2014	2016	2018	2020
60 metres	X	X	X	X	X	X	X	X	X	X	X
200 metres	X	X	X	X	X	X	X	X	X	X	X
400 metres	X	X	X	X	X	X	X	X	X	X	X
800 metres	X	X	X	X	X	X	X	X	X	X	X
1500 metres	X	X	X	X	X	X	X	X	X	X	X
3000 metres	X	X	X	X	X	X	X	X	X	X	X
60 metre hurdles	X	X	X	X	X	X	X	X	X	X	X
4 × 200 metre relay	X	X	X	X	X	X	X	X	X	X	X
4 × 400 metre relay	X	X	X	X	X	X	X	X	X	X	X
1.5km race walk	—	—	—	—	—	F	F	—	—	—	—
3km race walk	X	X	X	X	X	M	M	X	X	X	X
High jump	X	X	X	X	X	X	X	X	X	X	X
Long jump	X	X	X	X	X	X	X	X	X	X	X
Triple jump	X	X	X	X	X	X	X	X	X	X	X
Shot put	X	X	X	X	X	X	X	X	X	X	X
Pole vault	—	—	—	—	—	—	—	M	M	M	X
Pentathlon	X	X	X	X	X	X	X	X	X	X	X
Triathlon	—	—	—	—	—	—	—	—	—	—	X

== INAS World Athletics Outdoor Championships ==
Year	Host	Date	Nations	Events	Notes
1989	(Sweden) Härnösand	2–6 July			
1999	(Spain) Seville	15–18 September			
2001	(Tunisia) Tunis	7–10 July			
2003	(Tunisia) Tunis	3–10 July			
2005	(Australia) Canberra	26–30 September			
2007	(Brazil) Fortaleza	18–22 September			
2009	(Czech Republic) Jablonec nad Nisou	7–11 July			
2013	(Czech Republic) Prague	6–13 June			
2017	(Thailand) Bangkok	12–19 May			
2021	(Poland) Toruń				
2025	(Australia) Brisbane	8–15 October			

== INAS World Athletics Indoor Championships ==
Year	Host	Dates	Nations	Events	Notes
2001	(Portugal) Espinho	16–18 March			
2003	(Poland) Spała	21–23 March			
2004	(Hungary) Budapest	20–21 March			
2006	(Sweden) Bollnäs	24–26 March			
2008	(Estonia) Tallinn	13–17 March			
2010	(Sweden) Bollnäs	14–19 April			
2012	(United Kingdom) Manchester	16–17 March			
2014	(France) Reims	28 February – 2 March			
2016	(Italy) Ancona	9–13 March			
2018	(France) Val de Reuil	2–4 March			
2020	(Poland) Toruń	25–27 February			
2024	(France) Reims	20–25 February			

== Medal tables ==
=== Outdoor ===
As of 2021. Scotland, England and Wales competed from 1989 to 2003, Great Britain competed from 2005 onwards.

Rank	Nation	Gold	Silver	Bronze	Total
1	Poland	117	52	44	213
2	Portugal	32	60	67	159
3	Ukraine	26	19	9	54
4	Tunisia	25	30	18	73
5	France	25	25	26	76
6	Spain	23	24	21	68
7	Great Britain	22	25	24	71
8	Australia	20	22	31	73
9	Estonia	12	13	10	35
10	Russia	11	10	5	26
11	Hungary	10	22	20	52
12	Sweden	9	11	8	28
13	South Africa	9	10	12	31
14	Italy	9	5	5	19
15	Japan	8	13	14	35
16	Cape Verde	7	2	0	9
17	Turkey	5	4	9	18
18	Brazil	5	3	10	18
19	Puerto Rico	4	5	9	18
20	Kenya	4	0	2	6
21	Hong Kong	3	4	7	14
22	Greece	3	4	0	7
23	Mexico	3	1	1	5
24	Netherlands	2	11	9	22
25	Finland	2	5	7	14
26	Iran	2	2	4	8
27	Croatia	2	1	0	3
28	Venezuela	2	0	3	5
29	Czech Republic	1	4	2	7
30	Norway	1	1	0	2
30	Thailand	1	1	0	2
32	United Arab Emirates	1	0	0	1
33	India	0	2	0	2
33	Saudi Arabia	0	2	0	2
35	Argentina	0	1	1	2
36	Germany	0	1	0	1
37	Singapore	0	0	1	1
37	Uruguay	0	0	1	1
Totals (38 entries)		406	395	380	1,181

=== Indoor ===
As of 2020.

Rank	Nation	Gold	Silver	Bronze	Total
1	Poland	78	49	28	155
2	Portugal	65	75	86	226
3	Ukraine	34	25	18	77
4	Spain	27	21	13	61
5	Hungary	19	8	9	36
6	France	14	45	43	102
7	Russia	13	7	3	23
8	Sweden	13	5	15	33
9	Tunisia	12	15	10	37
10	Iran	9	5	4	18
11	Croatia	8	1	1	10
12	Great Britain	7	15	12	34
13	Turkey	6	6	13	25
14	Netherlands	5	15	11	31
15	Italy	4	6	2	12
16	Czech Republic	4	3	2	9
17	Cape Verde	4	2	2	8
18	Hong Kong	3	3	9	15
19	Norway	3	3	0	6
20	Estonia	2	9	11	22
21	Argentina	1	0	1	2
22	Germany	0	1	1	2
23	Mexico	0	1	0	1
23	Suriname	0	1	0	1
25	Finland	0	0	2	2
26	Macau	0	0	1	1
Totals (26 entries)		331	321	297	949
